= 1867 Melbourne Cup =

Annual horse race in Melbourne, Victoria

- Melbourne Cup
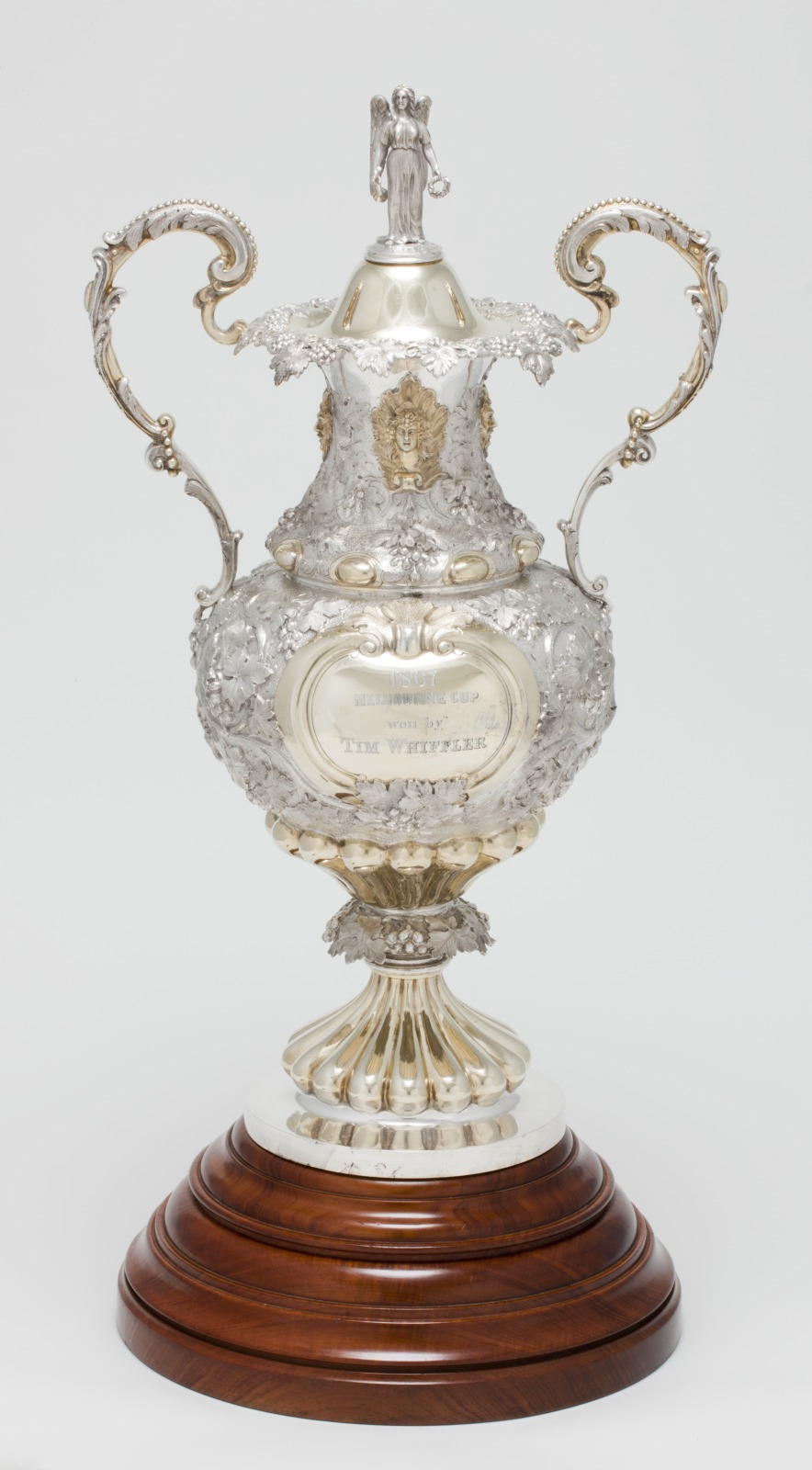
- 1867 Melbourne Cup won by (Sydney) Tim Whiffler
- Location: Flemington Racecourse
- Date: 31 October 1867
- Distance: 2 miles
- Winning horse: Tim Whiffler
- Winning time: 3:39.0
- Final odds: 5/2
- Jockey: John Driscoll
- Trainer: Etienne de Mestre
- Owner: Etienne de Mestre
- Conditions: Good
- Surface: Turf
- Attendance: 16,000

The 1867 Melbourne Cup was a two-mile handicap horse race which took place on Thursday, 31 October 1867.

This year was the seventh running of the Melbourne Cup. Just like in 1866 the race saw two horses with the same name take part. Both horses were called Tim Whiffler. To avoid another mix up the horses were referred to as 'Melbourne Tim' and 'Sydney Tim'. 'Sydney Tim' was trained by Etienne de Mestre who trained Archer to win the first two Melbourne Cups. 'Sydney Tim' won the AJC Derby on route to a 2 length win as 5/2 favourite. 'Melbourne Tim' ran fifth while Exile the previous year's runner up finished third. The Tim Whiffler's who ran in this race are not to be confused with Tim Whiffler son of 'Sydeney Tim' who won the Great Northern Derby in New Zealand in 1881 nor an English sire also named Tim Whiffler who was brought to Australia and sired future cup winners Briseis and Darriwell. The winning time of 3:39.0 was at the time the fastest winning time in the race's history.

The Victoria Racing Club (VRC) received 65 entries for the race. Following declarations 30 runners were nominated for the race, although three horses were scratched before race day, leaving a field of 27 horses to start under grey skies. There were criticisms that some of the Sydney-trained horses had been harshly weighted by the VRC Handicapping Committee, but the punters disgreed, installing Sydney Tim as clear favourite despite the heavy weight handicap. The next most fancied runner was fellow Sydney-trained Fireworks from the stable of previous year's winner John Tait.

The attendance at Flemington was "greater than seen before" for the race. Following a false start where Lancashire Witch went on a solo gallop and subsequently did not return to the start in time, Fireworks was slow to start behind the field. Along the back of the course, 1865 Melbourne Cup winner Toryboy alternated the lead with Barwon and Rip Van Winkle, until they were joined by Exile and Sparrowhawk. In the final mile of the race, Sydney Tim went forward as Exile led the horses into the Flemington straight. Sydney Tim took the lead down the straight, out-galloping the field to win by two lengths from Queen of Hearts.

The win was the third Melbourne Cup for owner/trainer Etienne de Mestre who had previously stated that he would never return to the race following the controversy surrounding the entries for the 1863 Melbourne Cup.

== Full results ==
This is the list of placegetters for the 1867 Melbourne Cup.

| Place | Horse | Age Gender | Jockey | Weight | Trainer | Owner | Odds | Margin |
|---|---|---|---|---|---|---|---|---|
| 1 | Sydney Tim Whiffler | 5y h | John Driscoll | 8 st 11 lb (55.8 kg) | Etienne de Mestre | Etienne de Mestre | 5/2 fav. | 2 lengths |
| 2 | Queen of Hearts | 3y f | T. Bennett | 5 st 12 lb (37.2 kg) (Note: Was supposed to carry 5st 10lb) | | Sam Waldock | 30/1 | 1 length |
| 3 | Exile | Aged g | Bobby Waterman | 7 st 10 lb (49.0 kg) | | Dan Melhado | 20/1 | |
| 4 | Glencoe | 3y c | Coker | 6 st 4 lb (39.9 kg) | | John Tait | 12/1 | |
| 5 | Melbourne Tim Whiffler | 5y h | Joe Morrison | 8 st 8 lb (54.4 kg) | | Walter Craig | 50/1 | |
| —N/a | Falcon | 6y g | Charles Stanley | 8 st 7 lb (54.0 kg) | | John Tait | 20/1 | |
| —N/a | Strop | Aged g | Gill | 8 st 7 lb (54.0 kg) | | William Field | 25/1 | |
| —N/a | Cowra | 5y m | Thompson | 8 st 7 lb (54.0 kg) | | Edward Meade Bagot | 20/1 | |
| —N/a | Nimblefoot | 4y g | Joe Carter | 8 st 1 lb (51.3 kg) | | Walter Craig | 33/1 | |
| —N/a | Barwon | 8y h | H. Cooke | 8 st 1 lb (51.3 kg) (Note: Was supposed to carry 7st 12lb) | | John Cleeland | 20/1 | |
| —N/a | Crusader | 4y h | Nunn | 7 st 1 lb (44.9 kg) | | Mr Adcock | 100/1 | |
| —N/a | North Australian | 4y h | Holmes | 7 st 9 lb (48.5 kg) | | Ratcliffe Pring | 33/1 | |
| —N/a | Sparrowhawk | 6y g | Harry Chifney (Note: Jockey Henry Dawes rode under the name Harry Chifney.) | 7 st 7 lb (47.6 kg) | | William Pearson | 25/1 | |
| —N/a | Woodman | Aged g | Thomas Pullar | 7 st 7 lb (47.6 kg) | | Mr J. Holmes | 50/1 | |
| —N/a | Cedric | Aged g | Tunstall | 7 st 6 lb (47.2 kg) | | Mr J. Lamb | 100/1 | |
| —N/a | Poetess | 5y m | Arch Hill | 7 st 6 lb (47.2 kg) | | Mr F. Hobson | 33/1 | |
| —N/a | Mary Ann | Aged m | J. Hill | 7 st 2 lb (45.4 kg) | | Mr J. Whitehead | 100/1 | |
| —N/a | Toryboy | 10y g | S. Davis | 7 st 0 lb (44.5 kg) | | Mr J. Walker | 20/1 | |
| —N/a | Shenandoah | Aged m | Alf Hill | 6 st 13 lb (44.0 kg) (Note: Was supposed to carry 6st 10lb) | | John Cleeland | 33/1 | |
| —N/a | Fireworks | 3y c | Greene | 6 st 7 lb (41.3 kg) | | John Tait | 3/1 | |
| —N/a | Lady Jane | 4y m | J. Taylor | 6 st 5 lb (40.4 kg) | | Mr F. Howell | 100/1 | |
| —N/a | Protection | 6y g | Francis | 6 st 5 lb (40.4 kg) (Note: Was supposed to carry 6st 0lb) | | Mr J. Holmes | 50/1 | |
| —N/a | Rip Van Winkle | 3y c | Mathieson | 5 st 10 lb (36.3 kg) | | Mr G. Lewis | 25/1 | |
| —N/a | The Fly | 3y f | Jamieson | 5 st 9 lb (35.8 kg) | | Charles Brown Fisher | 12/1 | |
| Last | Privateer (Note: Formerly known as Glenyville) | Aged g | H. Taylor | 6 st 8 lb (41.7 kg) | | Mr J. Rule | 10/1 | |
| DNF | Smuggler | 5y h | A. Davis | 9 st 3 lb (58.5 kg) | | Charles Brown Fisher | 50/1 | |
| DNS | Lancashire Witch | 3y f | J. Adderley | 6 st 2 lb (39.0 kg) (Note: Was supposed to carry 5st 13lb) | | Louis Lawrence Smith | 50/1 | |
| SCR | Rose of Australia | 5y m | —N/a | —N/a | —N/a | Mr J. Eales | —N/a | |
| SCR | Harbinger | 3y c | —N/a | —N/a | —N/a | Mr T. Gordon | —N/a | |
| SCR | Palladium | 3y f | —N/a | —N/a | —N/a | Sam Waldock | —N/a | |

== Prizemoney ==
First prize £1130, second prize £20.

== See also ==
- Melbourne Cup
- List of Melbourne Cup winners
- Victoria Racing Club
