= 1871 Melbourne Cup =

Annual horse race in Victoria, Australia

- Melbourne Cup
- Location: Flemington Racecourse
- Date: 9 November 1871
- Distance: 2 miles
- Winning horse: The Pearl
- Winning time: 3:39.00
- Final odds: 100/1
- Jockey: John Kavanagh
- Trainer: John Tait
- Owner: John Tait
- Surface: Turf
- Attendance: 40,000

The 1871 Melbourne Cup was a two-mile handicap horse race which took place on Thursday, 9 November 1871.

This year was the eleventh running of the Melbourne Cup. It was the third Melbourne Cup win for owner and trainer John Tait.

The Pearl was one of four horses to win the Melbourne Cup at 100/1. Wotan (1936), Old Rowley (1940) and Prince of Penzance (2015) being the other three.

Before the day of the race, Pyrrhus was heavily backed and was the favoured of the two runners owned and trained by John Tait. Previous winner Nimblefoot wasn't as favoured, although the horse that it beat by a half head in 1870, Lapdog was said to have been better prepared for a good run. Lapdog's stablemate Romula would start favourite. Following a win in the Essendon Stakes during November, Mermaid was fancied by a few punters, while the lightly-raced Cleolite also attracted attention following the death of owner John Moffatt in the months prior to the race. Small grey horse Saladin was high on the betting sheets following a win in the Hotham Handicap. Previous winners Warrior and Glencoe were less fancied to feature in the placings, while Little Dick was noted as one to watch.

After morning showers, the weather didn't brighten much for the race in the afternoon. Due to a public holiday, the attendance at Flemington Racecourse was one of the largest seen, with the course crowded hours before the commencement of the race.

There have been 23 starters for the race following the withdrawals of Lottery and Hamlet. Saladin led the field ahead towards the first turn, but as the field rounded the turn, The Monk fell and Lord of Lynne threw its jockey. Both jockeys needing medical attention. The fall almost took out Glencoe and a couple of other runners. Barbelle took the lead down the back straight, with Saladin retaking the lead before the turn for home. Under the whip entering the Flemington straight, The Pearl dashed clear with Romula gamely keeping up, and it would be the 100/1 outsider The Pearl that was in front by two lengths at the winning post. It was John Tait's third Melbourne Cup triumph as owner/trainer, following wins with The Barb (1866) and Glencoe (1868).

Following the race, the owner of second-placed finisher Romula protested against the winner, claiming that jockey John Kavanagh had struck Romula's jockey James Wilson Jr, but the protest was dismissed after a short deliberation by the stewards. Irish King was awarded third place ahead of Saladin.

A training accident had seemingly discounted The Pearl's chances in the Melbourne Cup, with Tait uncertain that the horse would start.

The Melbourne Cup was The Pearl's fourth win in 21 races, while winning jockey John Kavanagh also won the 1865 Melbourne Cup riding Toryboy. Writing in The Age Kavanagh described the finish of the race:

The horse was covered with froth about the shoulders, and I kept saying to myself "I wish this was the post. I wish this was the post." I could feel Romula's breath puffing hot on my right leg. All at once I knew we were past the post by a tremendous big shout. I felt just as if I could fall off the horse. Then I dropped back upon the saddle, and the horse eased off with the rest. Almost before I could turn, there was a monster crowd of people all around me cheering, and so we went back to the stand.

== Full results ==
This is the list of placegetters for the 1871 Melbourne Cup.

| Place | Horse | Age Gender | Jockey | Weight | Trainer | Owner | Odds | Margin |
|---|---|---|---|---|---|---|---|---|
| 1 | The Pearl | 5y h | John Kavanagh | 7 st 3 lb (45.8 kg) | John Tait | John Tait | 100/1 | 2 lengths |
| 2 | Romula | 4y m | James Wilson Jr | 7 st 10 lb (49.0 kg) | James Wilson | Joe Thompson | 3/1 fav. | 1 length |
| 3 | Irish King | 3y c | Haughey | 6 st 0 lb (38.1 kg) | | James J. Miller | 50/1 | ½ neck |
| 4 | Saladin | Aged g | Dan Robinson | 6 st 7 lb (41.3 kg) | Dan Robinson | Mr J.R. Crocke | 7/1 | |
| 5 | Little Dick | 5y g | T. Brown | 8 st 8 lb (54.4 kg) | | Mr W. Winch | 7/1 | |
| 6 | Mermaid | 5y m | William Simpson | 8 st 10 lb (55.3 kg) (Note: Was supposed to carry 8st 8lb) | James Wilson | Mr E. Twomey | 14/1 | |
| 7 | Pyrrhus | 4y h | Shields | 6 st 12 lb (43.5 kg) | John Tait | John Tait | 10/1 | |
| 8 | Cleolite | 4y m | Johnny Day | 6 st 9 lb (42.2 kg) (Note: Was supposed to carry 6st 6lb) | | John Moffatt (deceased) | 5/1 | |
| 9 | The Baron | 6y g | Bryan | 7 st 5 lb (46.7 kg) | | Mr W. Winch | 33/1 | |
| —N/a | Duke of Montrose | Aged h | Fleeson | 6 st 12 lb (43.5 kg) | | Mr J. Brown | 33/1 | |
| —N/a | Glencoe | 7y h | William Lang | 9 st 8 lb (60.8 kg) | William Lang | Horatio Huntly Hoskins | 25/1 | |
| —N/a | Nimblefoot | 8y g | Charles Stanley | 9 st 2 lb (58.1 kg) | William Lang | Horatio Huntly Hoskins | 33/1 | |
| —N/a | Barbelle | 6y m | Joe Kean | 8 st 0 lb (50.8 kg) | | Edward Lee | 25/1 | |
| —N/a | Bylong | Aged h | Bennett | 7 st 7 lb (47.6 kg) | | Thomas Ivory | 18/1 | |
| —N/a | Warrior | 8y g | William Yeomans | 8 st 10 lb (55.3 kg) | Robert Standish Sevior | Austin Saqui | 20/1 | |
| —N/a | Valentine | 6y m | Hiram Howard | 7 st 0 lb (44.5 kg) | | Henry Bowler | 25/1 | |
| —N/a | Aruma | Aged m | J. Sherringham | 6 st 9 lb (42.2 kg) | | Mr J. Ilhffe | 25/1 | |
| —N/a | Rambler | Aged g | Chalker | 6 st 8 lb (41.7 kg) | | Phil Glenister | 100/1 | |
| —N/a | Lapdog | 7y g | Savage | 7 st 12 lb (49.9 kg) | James Wilson | Mr J. Gilbert | 5/1 | |
| —N/a | The Foam | 5y m | McInnes | 7 st 5 lb (46.7 kg) | William Lang | Mr J. Arthur | 100/1 | |
| —N/a | Praetor | Aged h | Mathieson | 7 st 0 lb (44.5 kg) | | Mr P. Lewis | 25/1 | |
| Fell | The Monk | 7y h | William Enderson | 7 st 2 lb (45.4 kg) | | Mr F. Henty | 50/1 | |
| Fell | Lord of Lynne | 3y c | Carey | 5 st 7 lb (34.9 kg) | | Messrs H. & B. Allen | 50/1 | |
| SCR | Lottery | 5y h | —N/a | 7 st 7 lb (47.6 kg) | —N/a | Mr T. Lamond | —N/a | |
| SCR | Hamlet | 3y c | —N/a | 6 st 10 lb (42.6 kg) | —N/a | Mr P. Lewis | —N/a | |
| SCR | Miss Jessie | 3y f | —N/a | 5 st 12 lb (37.2 kg) | James Wilson | James Wilson | —N/a | |

== Prizemoney ==
First prize £1040, second prize £50, third prize £20.

== See also ==
- Melbourne Cup
- List of Melbourne Cup winners
- Victoria Racing Club
