= 1866 Melbourne Cup =

Edition of the Melbourne Cup

- Melbourne Cup
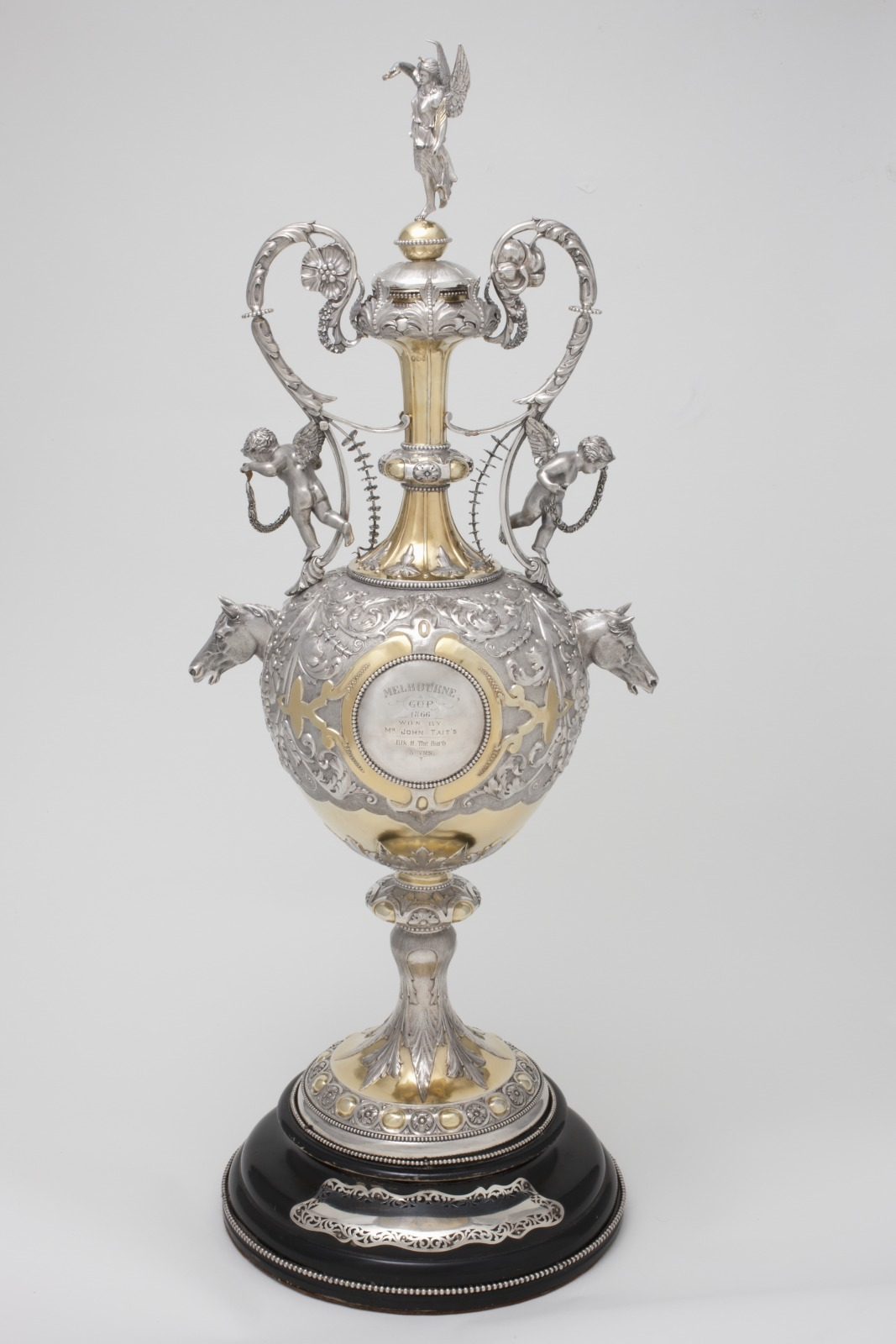
- The 1866 Melbourne Cup trophy, currently held by the National Museum of Australia
- Location: Flemington Racecourse
- Date: 1 November 1866
- Distance: 2 miles
- Winning horse: The Barb
- Winning time: 3:43.0
- Final odds: 6/1
- Jockey: William Davis
- Trainer: John Tait & James Ashworth
- Owner: John Tait
- Conditions: Good
- Surface: Turf
- Attendance: 18,000

The 1866 Melbourne Cup was a two-mile handicap horse race which took place on Thursday, 1 November 1866.

This year was the sixth running of the Melbourne Cup. The race was won by 6/1 favourite The Barb, nicknamed 'The Black Demon', beating Exile. Falcon was placed third by the stewards the day after the race. The race saw two horses named Falcon take part and the VRC judge failed to recognise its colors which were different to the official program. The Barb became the first horse to win the Melbourne Cup and the AJC Derby as The Barb had won the race back in September. The AJC Derby now takes place in the Autumn.

Fifty-three horses nominated for the race, with 44 horses accepted. Following acceptances, 31 horses paid the entry fees, although two were scratched before race day. This year marked the return of Sydney-trained horses to the race, following the controversy surrounding the non-acceptance of Archer's nomination in 1863.

The Barb, one of three horses owned by John Tait in the race, started as the favourite ahead of stablemate Falcon, with Tim Whiffler, Lady Heron and Seagull the next fancied runners. Of the Victorian-trained horses, Exile had attracted a number of bets, while 1865 Melbourne Cup winner Toryboy was one of the more fancied runners. After the morning scratching of Volunteer, 28 horses started the race. Following a false start where Seagull broke away and was not stopped for some time, Cowra and Minstrel missed the start and after the rest of the field got off to a strong start, The Barb and Glenyuille went ahead at the first turn, followed by Tim Whiffler and Barwon. Glenyuille's race was done at about the mile marker, leaving Tim Whiffler to try to catch The Barb. Exile went up to the leader before the final turn and it was a two-horse race down the final straight, with The Barb holding firm to win by little more than a head. It was reported that the jockey aboard Exile lost the whip which might have affected the final result.

== Full results ==
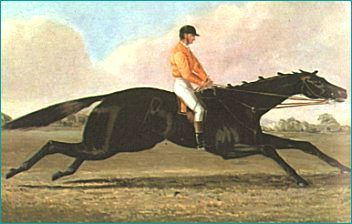
Painting of 1866 Melbourne Cup winner The Barb

This is the list of placegetters for the 1866 Melbourne Cup.

Place	Horse	Age Gender	Jockey	Weight	Trainer	Owner	Odds	Margin
1	The Barb	3y c	William Davis	6 st 11 lb (43.1 kg) (Note: Was supposed to carry 6st 9lb)	John Tait & James Ashworth	John Tait	6/1 fav.	Head
2	Exile	Aged g	John Kavanagh	7 st 10 lb (49.0 kg)		Patrick Keighran	20/1	3 lengths
3	Falcon (Sydney)	5y g	Charles Stanley	8 st 2 lb (51.7 kg)		John Tait	7/1	
4	Playboy	Aged g	Bobby Waterman	8 st 0 lb (50.8 kg)		Patrick Keighran	25/1	
5	Seagull	3y f	Alf Hill	6 st 7 lb (41.3 kg)		Charles Brown Fisher	8/1	
6	Mozart	Aged g	Arch Hill	7 st 1 lb (44.9 kg)		Mr J. Armstrong	200/1	
7	Coventry	4y g	Griffin	6 st 12 lb (43.5 kg)		Mr T. Henry	50/1	
8	Tim Whiffler	4y h	Harry Chifney (Note: Jockey Henry Dawes rode under the name Harry Chifney.)	8 st 9 lb (54.9 kg)	Joe Carter	Walter Craig	8/1	
—N/a	Barwon	7y h	Haynes	8 st 7 lb (54.0 kg)		John Cleeland	20/1	
—N/a	Cowra	4y m	Stevens	8 st 7 lb (54.0 kg)		Edward Meade Bagot	25/1	
—N/a	Lady Heron	4y m	Joe Morrison	8 st 6 lb (53.5 kg)		Charles Brown Fisher	8/1	
—N/a	Falcon (Victoria)	Aged g	Bateman	8 st 6 lb (53.5 kg)		Mr Lewis	100/1	
—N/a	Sparrowhawk	5y g	Harvey	8 st 5 lb (53.1 kg)		William Pearson	12/1	
—N/a	Warwick	5y g	Holmes	8 st 5 lb (53.1 kg)		John Tait	20/1	
—N/a	Musidora	Aged m	McDonald	8 st 4 lb (52.6 kg)	James Wilson	James Wilson	20/1	
—N/a	Woodman	Aged m	Bishop	8 st 4 lb (52.6 kg)		Mr S. Thompson	100/1	
—N/a	Miss Fisher	4y m	Joe Carter	8 st 0 lb (50.8 kg)	Joe Carter	Walter Craig	20/1	
—N/a	Viscount	Aged m	Mason	7 st 12 lb (49.9 kg)		William Pearson	200/1	
—N/a	Toryboy	9y g	Green	7 st 8 lb (48.1 kg)		William Cross Yuille	12/1	
—N/a	Dun Dolo	Aged g	Tyrrell	7 st 5 lb (46.7 kg)		Arch McDonald	50/1	
—N/a	Minstrel	6y g	Gregory	7 st 5 lb (46.7 kg)		George Watson	50/1	
—N/a	Shenandoah	6y m	Thomas Pullar	7 st 2 lb (45.4 kg)		John Cleeland	50/1	
—N/a	Deception	5y m	Parr	7 st 0 lb (44.5 kg)		Mr H.D. Parr	8/1	
—N/a	Glenyille	6y g	J. Hill	7 st 0 lb (44.5 kg)		Louis Lawrence Smith	100/1	
—N/a	Protection	5y g	J. Davis	6 st 4 lb (39.9 kg)		Louis Lawrence Smith	100/1	
—N/a	Lunatic	3y c	Howell	6 st 0 lb (38.1 kg) (Note: Was supposed to carry 5st 8lb)		Mr S. Waldock	20/1	
—N/a	Solitaire	3y c	T. Bennett	5 st 8 lb (35.4 kg)		Mr W.I. Faris	100/1	
—N/a	Songster	5y g	Parslow	8 st 6 lb (53.5 kg)		Geoffrey Wright	100/1	
SCR	Volunteer	Aged h	—N/a	10 st 0 lb (63.5 kg)	—N/a	John Tait	—N/a	
SCR	Midshipman	6y	—N/a	8 st 6 lb (53.5 kg)	—N/a	Walter Craig	—N/a	
SCR	Sultana	5y m	—N/a	8 st 2 lb (51.7 kg)	—N/a	—N/a	—N/a	

== Prizemoney ==
First prize £980, second prize £20.

The winning owner also received a silver trophy from England that displays Alexander taming the horse, the engraved name of the winning horse and a figure of a winged female.

== See also ==
- Melbourne Cup
- List of Melbourne Cup winners
- Victoria Racing Club
