= 1861 Melbourne Cup =

Annual horse race in Melbourne, Victoria

- Melbourne Cup
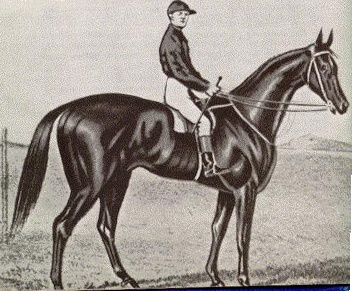
- Illustration of 1861 winner Archer
- Location: Flemington Racecourse
- Date: 7 November 1861
- Distance: 2 miles
- Winning horse: Archer
- Winning time: 3:52
- Final odds: 6/1
- Jockey: John Cutts
- Trainer: Etienne L. de Mestre
- Owner: Etienne L. de Mestre
- Surface: Turf
- Attendance: 4000

The 1861 Melbourne Cup was a two-mile handicap horse race which took place on Thursday, 7 November 1861. The race was organised by the Victoria Turf Club and held at the Flemington Racecourse (then known as the Melbourne Racecourse).

This year was the first running of the Melbourne Cup. Billed as "one of the finest races ever seen upon the course," 57 horses were nominated and there were 20 acceptances. Three were scratched on race day, leaving 17 starters.

After one false start, three horses fell due to congestion on the first turn, resulting in deaths to two runners Despatch and Medora. One jockey was knocked unconscious and Joe Morrison sustained a compound fracture to his arm after coming off Despatch. The fall led to changes to the track at Flemington, including lengthening the straight.

Mormon led the remaining runners down the river side of the course, with Prince and Flatcatcher falling back from the leader due to the pace, while Antonelli and the two de Mestre runners moved forward. Archer took the lead ahead of Antonelli at the far turn and by the time Archer led the field into the straight its lead was so great that the race was only on for second place. Mormon eventually drew forward from the pack to finish second ahead of Prince who got ahead of a tiring Antonelli.

Ridden by John Cutts, Archer won the race by six lengths in a time of 3:52. Archer had been leased by Etienne L. de Mestre, and had been brought to Melbourne from Sydney aboard the SS City of Sydney, which transported several horses to Melbourne. A long-standing folktale was that Archer had walked from Nowra to Flemington.

As a lessee de Mestre owned and was fully responsible for Archer during the lease. Archer was leased from the "Exeter Farm" of Jembaicumbene near Braidwood, New South Wales. His owners were Thomas John "Tom" Roberts (a good school-friend of de Mestre's), Rowland H. Hassall (Roberts' brother-in-law), and Edmund Molyneux Royds and William Edward Royds (Roberts' nephews).

The race was held not long after news had reached Melbourne of the death of explorers Burke and Wills who had left Melbourne in August 1860, with some accounting that the news had led to lower than expected attendance for the race meeting.

== Full results ==
This is the list of placegetters for the 1861 Melbourne Cup.

Place	Horse	Age Gender	Jockey	Weight	Trainer	Owner	Odds	Margin
1	Archer	5y h	John Cutts	9 st 7 lb (60.3 kg)	Etienne L. de Mestre	Etienne L. de Mestre	5/1	6 lengths
2	Mormon	6y h	William Simpson	10 st 1 lb (64.0 kg)	—N/a	James Henderson	3/1 fav.	2 lengths
3	Prince	Aged g	J. Bishop	8 st 0 lb (50.8 kg)	—N/a	William Pearson	20/1	
4	Antonelli	3y c	Cowen	6 st 7 lb (41.3 kg)	—N/a	Mr. Warby	20/1	
5	Toryboy	4y g	H. Cooke	7 st 11 lb (49.4 kg)	—N/a	William Cross Yuille	5/1	
6	Flatcatcher	Aged g	Perkins	9 st 8 lb (60.8 kg)	—N/a	Mr T.J. Bavin	10/1	
7	The Moor	Aged g	Robinson	8 st 12 lb (56.2 kg)	—N/a	George Watson	12/1	
—N/a	Nutwith	Aged g	Sam Waldock	8 st 12 lb (56.2 kg)	—N/a	Mr. J.D. Fisher	12/1	
—N/a	Inheritor	Aged g	McCabe	8 st 7 lb (54.0 kg)	Etienne L. de Mestre	Etienne L. de Mestre	10/1	
—N/a	Grey Dawn	4y m	Harry Yeend	7 st 12 lb (49.9 kg)	—N/a	John Coldham	25/1	
—N/a	Black Bess	6y m	James Monaghan	7 st 11 lb (49.4 kg)	—N/a	Mr. Evans	50/1	
—N/a	Sorcerer	3y g	Hughes	6 st 9 lb (42.2 kg)	—N/a	James Henderson	33/1	
—N/a	Fireaway	3y g	H. Howard	6 st 6 lb (40.8 kg)	—N/a	Mr. Cole	20/1	
—N/a	Lucy Ashton	3y f	S. Davis	6 st 4 lb (39.9 kg)	—N/a	Mr. Coleman	50/1	
Fell	Despatch	Aged m	Joe Morrison	8 st 9 lb (54.9 kg)	—N/a	James Henderson	7/2	
Fell	Twilight	Aged m	Haynes	7 st 12 lb (49.9 kg)	—N/a	John Coldham	20/1	
Fell	Medora	3y f	J. Henderson	7 st 0 lb (44.5 kg)	—N/a	James Henderson	16/1	
SCR	Eagle's Plume	3y c	Lankey	6 st 7 lb (41.3 kg)	—N/a	John Orr	20/1	
SCR	Parisan	Aged g	—N/a	8 st 7 lb (54.0 kg)	—N/a	Mr. T. Chirnside	—N/a	
SCR	Defence	6y g	—N/a	7 st 12 lb (49.9 kg)	—N/a	Mr. Coleman	—N/a	

== Prizemoney ==
First prize £710, second prize £20.

The winning owner was also presented with a hand-beaten gold watch.

== See also ==
- Melbourne Cup
- List of Melbourne Cup winners
- Victoria Racing Club
