= 1974 Melbourne Cup =

Edition of the Melbourne Cup

- Melbourne Cup
- Location: Flemington Racecourse
- Date: 5 Nov 1974
- Distance: 3200m
- Winning horse: Think Big
- Winning time: 3:23.2
- Final odds: 12/1
- Jockey: Harry White
- Trainer: Bart Cummings
- Owner: Dato Tan Chin Nam & Rick O'Sullivan
- Conditions: Good
- Surface: Turf

Battle Heights is up going for the lead now, on the outside coming out to have a crack at Igloo, Leilani is looking for a run between them will need it and here comes Captain Perri down the outside and Turfcutter, Turfcutter is mowing grass! Battle Heights went to the front at the 200 meter mark, from Leilani, Captain Peri on the outside then is Turfcutter and Think Big. Leilani is getting to Battle Heights and on the outside Captain Perri. Leilani just in front, Think Big is picking it up down the outside and Think Big has got up to win the Cup! Think Big has won, Leilani is second, third in the race then was Captain Perri.

— Commentator Bert Bryant describes the climax of the race

The 1974 Melbourne Cup was a handicap horse race which took place on Tuesday, 5 November 1974 over 3200m, at Flemington Racecourse.

The race was won by the gelding Think Big, trained by Bart Cummings and ridden by Harry White. The runner up was Leilani also trained by Bart Cummings, and third place went to Captain Peri. The winning margin was one length with a further length to third place.

This win gave Bart Cummings his fourth Melbourne Cup win and his third quinella of the race. Bart went on to record twelve Melbourne Cup training victories.

Bred by the estate of the late L. A. Alexander, Think Big was purchased by Bart for Dato Tan Chin Nam at the Trentham yearling sales in New Zealand at a price of $10,000. Think Big was sired by Sobig and his dam Sarcelle was by Oman. Think Big also won the 1975 Melbourne Cup for Bart and was once again ridden by Harry White.

As well as two victories on Think Big, Harry White also won the 1978 Melbourne Cup on Arwon and the 1979 race on Hyperno.

== Field ==
This is the full field that contested the 1974 Melbourne Cup.

Place	Horse	Trainer	Jockey	Weight	SP
1st	Think Big	Bart Cummings	Harry White	53kg	12/1
2nd	Leilani	Bart Cummings	Peter Cook	55.5kg	7/2 fav
3rd	Captain Peri (NZ)	Jack Wood	Max Baker	52kg	14/1
4th	Lord Metric	Merv Ritchie	Noel Harris	53kg	20/1
5th	Piping Lane	Ray Trinder	John Stocker	53kg	50/1
6th	Turfcutter (NZ)	Ray Verner	David Peake	53kg	7/1
7th	Battle Heights (NZ)	Tim Douglas	Gary Willets	61kg	11/2
8th	Igloo (NZ)	Tommy Smith	Neville Voigt	57.5kg	33/1
9th	Belotta (NZ)	R Campbell	Stan Aitkin	51kg	14/1
10th	Grand Scale	M Willmott	Pat Trotter	53kg	20/1
11th	Herminia	D Judd	Brian Gilders	50kg	8/1
12th	Taras Bulba	George Hanlon	Lyle Harbridge	47kg	20/1
13th	Gala Supreme	Ray Hutchins	Frank Reys	57.5kg	15/1
14th	Corroboree	T Howe	Darby McCarthy	55.5kg	80/1
15th	Paaetreul	Tommy Smith	Kevin Langby	56.5kg	40/1
16th	Top Order	Tommy Hughes	Malcolm Johnston	43.5kg	200/1
17th	Pilfer (NZ)	Colin Hayes	John Miller	53kg	40/1
18th	Gay Master	Tommy Hughes	Midge Didham	51kg	50/1
19th	Our Pocket	B J Boyle	John Letts	53kg	12/1
20th	Sequester	R Winks	Ray Setches	48kg	250/1
21st	Big Angel	E W Laing	Pat Hyland	52kg	33/1
22nd	High Sail (NZ)	Tommy Hughes	Alan Cooper	53kg	200/1

Scratched: Quick Answer (16), Stop The Music (23)
