= 1975 Melbourne Cup =

Edition of the Melbourne Cup

- Melbourne Cup
- Location: Flemington Racecourse
- Date: 4 Nov 1975
- Distance: 3200m
- Winning horse: Think Big
- Winning time: 3:29.6
- Final odds: 33/1
- Jockey: Harry White
- Trainer: Bart Cummings
- Owner: Dato Tan Chin Nam, Rick O'Sullivan & Tunku Abdul Rahman
- Conditions: Slow
- Surface: Turf

It's Think Big getting up to Medici at the 200, Suleiman is struggling, followed by Holiday Waggon. It's Think Big taking the lead in the Cup, he's drawn a length in front of Medici, Holiday Waggon next, Suleiman can't go on, but Captain Perri's running on well. But Think Big is in front and Think Big is going to win it two years in succession, a length to Holiday Waggon!

— Commentator Bill Collins describes the climax of the race.

The 1975 Melbourne Cup was a handicap horse race which took place on Tuesday, 4 November 1975 over 3200m, at Flemington Racecourse.

== Background ==
The race was won by the gelding Think Big, trained by Bart Cummings and ridden by Harry White. The combination of Think Big, Bart Cummings and Harry White had also won the 1974 Melbourne Cup. The runner up was Holiday Waggon also trained by Bart Cummings, and third place went to Medici. The winning margin was three quarters of a length with three lengths to third place.

This win gave Bart Cummings his fifth Melbourne Cup win equaling the record of Etienne L. de Mestre in the period 1861 to 1878. It was also Bart's fourth quinella of the race. Bart went on to record twelve Melbourne Cup training victories.

Bred by the estate of the late L. A. Alexander, Think Big was purchased by Bart for Dato Tan Chin Nam at the Trentham yearling sales in New Zealand at a price of $10,000. Think Big was sired by Sobig and his dam Sarcelle was by Oman.

As well as the two victories on Think Big, Harry White also won the 1978 Melbourne Cup on Arwon and the 1979 race on Hyperno.

== Field ==
The following are the placegetters in the 1975 Melbourne Cup.

Place	Horse	Weight (kg)	Trainer	Jockey
1st	Think Big	58.5	Bart Cummings	Harry White
2nd	Holiday Waggon	50	Bart Cummings	John Duggan
3rd	Medici (NZ)	46	Maurice D Hennah	Malcolm Johnston
4th	Sulieman (NZ)	52.5	W C (Bill) Winder	Pat Trotter
5th	Captain Peri (NZ)	52	Jack Wood	John Letts
