= 1862 Melbourne Cup =

Australian horse race

- Melbourne Cup
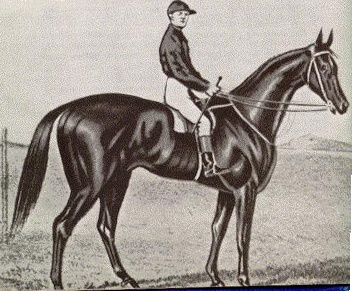
- Illustration of 1861 winner Archer
- Location: Flemington Racecourse
- Date: 13 November 1862
- Distance: 2 miles
- Winning horse: Archer
- Winning time: 3:47
- Final odds: 2/1
- Jockey: John Cutts
- Trainer: Etienne L. de Mestre
- Owner: Etienne L. de Mestre
- Surface: Turf
- Attendance: ≈5000

The 1862 Melbourne Cup was a two-mile handicap horse race which took place on Thursday, 13 November 1862.

This year was the second running of the Melbourne Cup and Archer's back-to-back wins would not be repeated again for over 100 years, until Rain Lover's wins.

On a sunny spring afternoon at Flemington, 20 horses started the race after Shadow had broken down the previous day. 1861 winner Archer started as favourite. Following the fall in the race the previous year, the starting point on the course had been shifted further along the main straight in front of the grandstand.

After the field spread down the riverside straight, Archer took the lead of the race before the final turn, winning by a reported six to eight lengths from Morman, with Camden in third place.

It was reported that the unplaced finisher Dun Dolo pulled up lame following the race.

== Full results ==
This is the list of placegetters for the 1862 Melbourne Cup.

Place	Horse	Age Gender	Jockey	Weight	Trainer	Owner	Odds	Margin
1	Archer	6y h	John Cutts	10 st 2 lb (64.4 kg)	Etienne L. de Mestre	Etienne L. de Mestre	2/1 fav.	8 lengths
2	Mormon	7y h	William Simpson	9 st 12 lb (62.6 kg)		Patrick Keighran	4/1	2 lengths
3	Camden	4y h	Joe Morrison	8 st 7 lb (54.0 kg)		James Henderson	4/1	
4	Talleyrand	6y g	Jimmy Ashworth	9 st 12 lb (62.6 kg)		John Tait	4/1	
5	Cedric	5y g	S. Davis	7 st 7 lb (47.6 kg)		Mr J. Lamb	100/1	
6	Toryboy	5y g	W. Trainor	7 st 13 lb (50.3 kg)		Mr McCormick	100/1	
7	Attila	Aged g	Gill	7 st 12 lb (49.9 kg)		Mr J. Lamb	25/1	
8	O.K.	3y g	Redman	6 st 2 lb (39.0 kg)		Mr Baillie	50/1	
9	Ithuriel	3y c	H. Howard	5 st 8 lb (35.4 kg)		Mr T. Henry	50/1	
10	Musidora	3y f	Greenwood	6 st 3 lb (39.5 kg)	James Wilson	James Wilson	10/1	
11	Ebor	4y h	Bates	8 st 1 lb (51.3 kg)	James Wilson	James Wilson	16/1	
12	Dun Dolo	4y h	Bobby Waterman	7 st 0 lb (44.5 kg)		Messrs. Wood & Kirk	25/1	
—N/a	The Colonel	5y h	Sam Waldock	9 st 0 lb (57.2 kg)		Mr H.C. Jeffrey	16/1	
—N/a	Susan (GBR)	5y m	Robinson	8 st 0 lb (50.8 kg)		Mr H.E. Hughes	100/1	
—N/a	Paul Pry	4y h	Cousins	7 st 13 lb (50.3 kg)		Mr J. Lamb	16/1	
—N/a	Flatcatcher (GBR)	Aged g	J. Carter	9 st 4 lb (59.0 kg)		Mr T.J. Bavin	16/1	
—N/a	Moscow (GBR)	5y h	James Monaghan	8 st 4 lb (52.6 kg)		Mr T.J. Bavin	100/1	
—N/a	Dauntless	5y h	James Henderson	8 st 2 lb (51.7 kg)		Mr Lang	50/1	
—N/a	Bray	Aged g	Solloway	7 st 12 lb (49.9 kg)		Mr J. Beynon	25/1	
—N/a	Lady Constance	4y m	Perkins	7 st 11 lb (49.4 kg)		Mr Harper	100/1	
SCR	Shadow	4y m		7 st 7 lb (47.6 kg)		Mr Glasscock	—N/a	
SCR	Clive							
SCR	Exeter							

Note: Runners were listed in approximate finishing order where not known.

== Prizemoney ==
First prize £810, second prize £20.

== See also ==
- Melbourne Cup
- List of Melbourne Cup winners
- Victoria Racing Club
