= John Driscoll (jockey) =

Australian jockey

John F. Driscoll (born in Sydney, New South Wales), nicknamed "Old Jack", was an Australian jockey who was best known for riding Tim Whiffler to victory in the 1867 Melbourne Cup.
