= 1930 Melbourne Cup =

- Melbourne Cup
- Location: Flemington Racecourse
- Date: 4 Nov 1930
- Distance: 2 miles
- Winning horse: Phar Lap
- Winning time: 3:27.75
- Final odds: 8/11
- Jockey: James E. Pike
- Trainer: Harry R. Telford
- Owner: Harry R. Telford; David Davis
- Surface: Turf

The 1930 Melbourne Cup was a two-mile handicap horse race which took place on Tuesday, 4 November 1930.

The placegetters were:

Place	Name	Jockey
1	Phar Lap	James E. Pike
2	Second Wind	T. Lewis
3	Shadow King	P. Tehan

== See also ==
- Melbourne Cup
- List of Melbourne Cup winners
- Victoria Racing Club
