= Melbourne Cup =

Annual Thoroughbred horse race in Melbourne, Australia

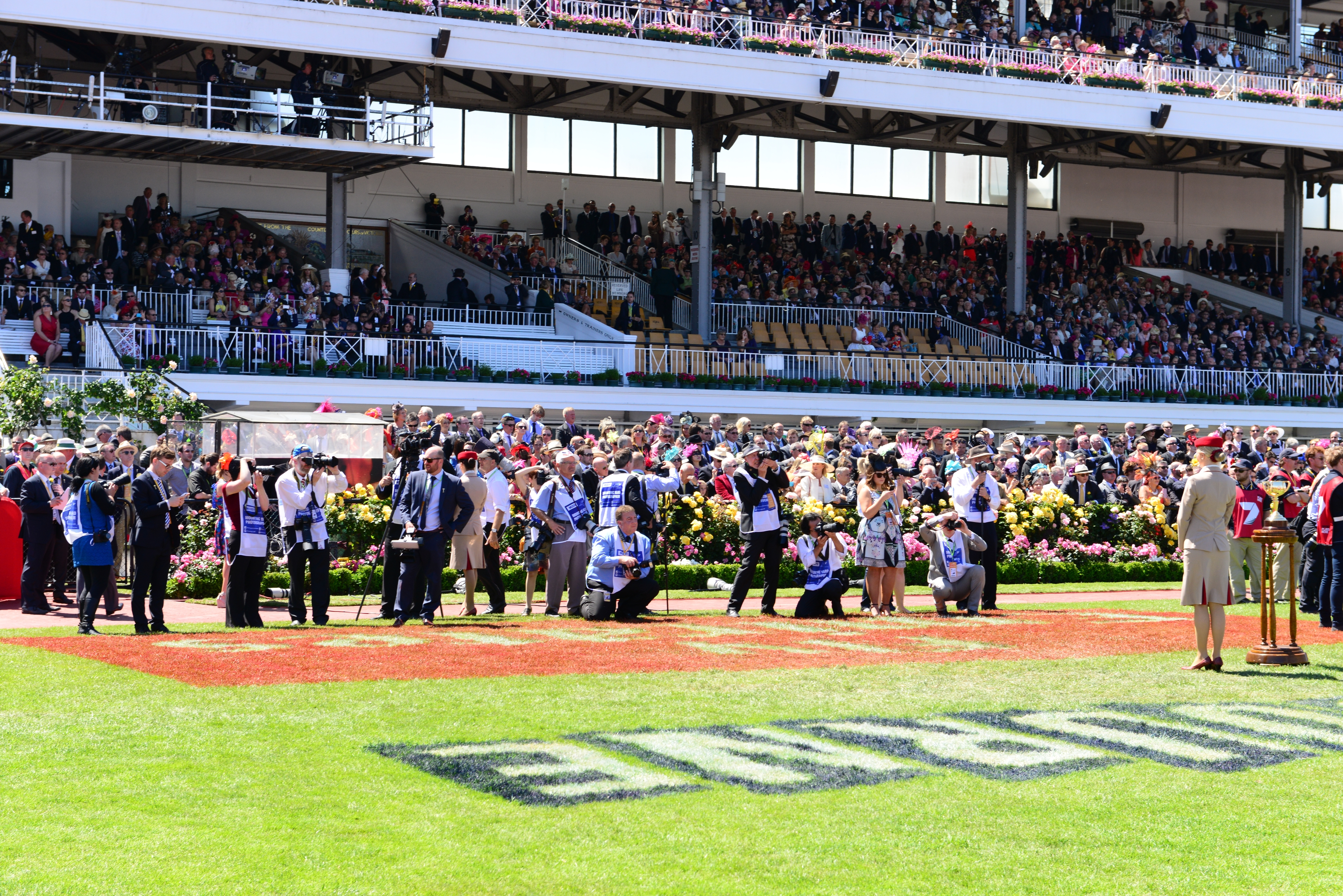
- Melbourne Cup 2013
- Class: Group 1
- Location: Flemington Racecourse; Melbourne, Victoria, Australia
- Inaugurated: 1861; 165 years ago (List of Melbourne Cup winners)
- Race type: Thoroughbred – Flat racing
- Sponsor: Lexus (2026)

Race information
- Distance: 3,200 m (1 mi 1,740 yd)
- Surface: Turf
- Track: Left-handed
- Qualification: Three-year-olds and up
- Weight: Handicap
- Purse: A$10.2 million (US$7.1 million) (2026)

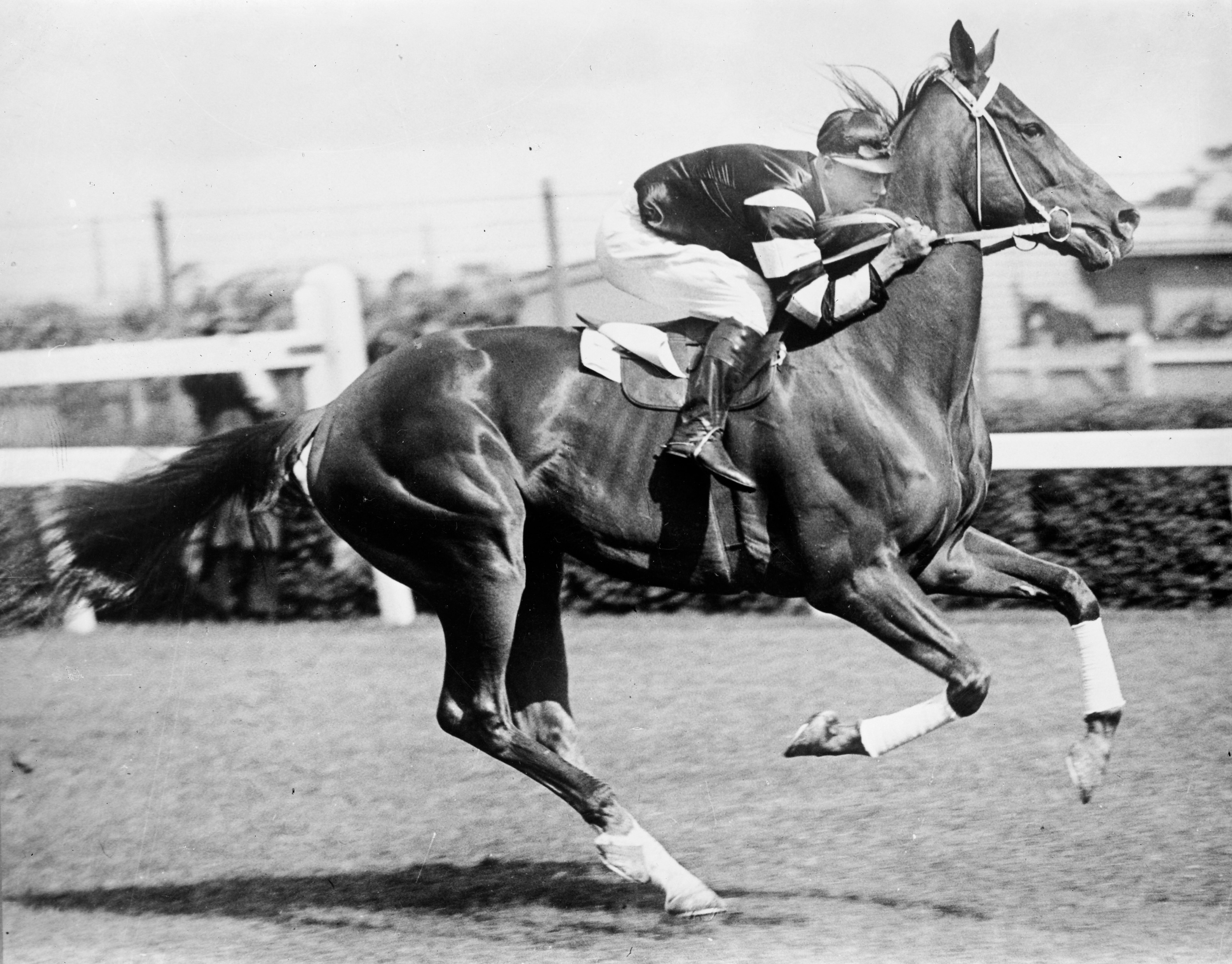
Phar Lap, 1930 winner

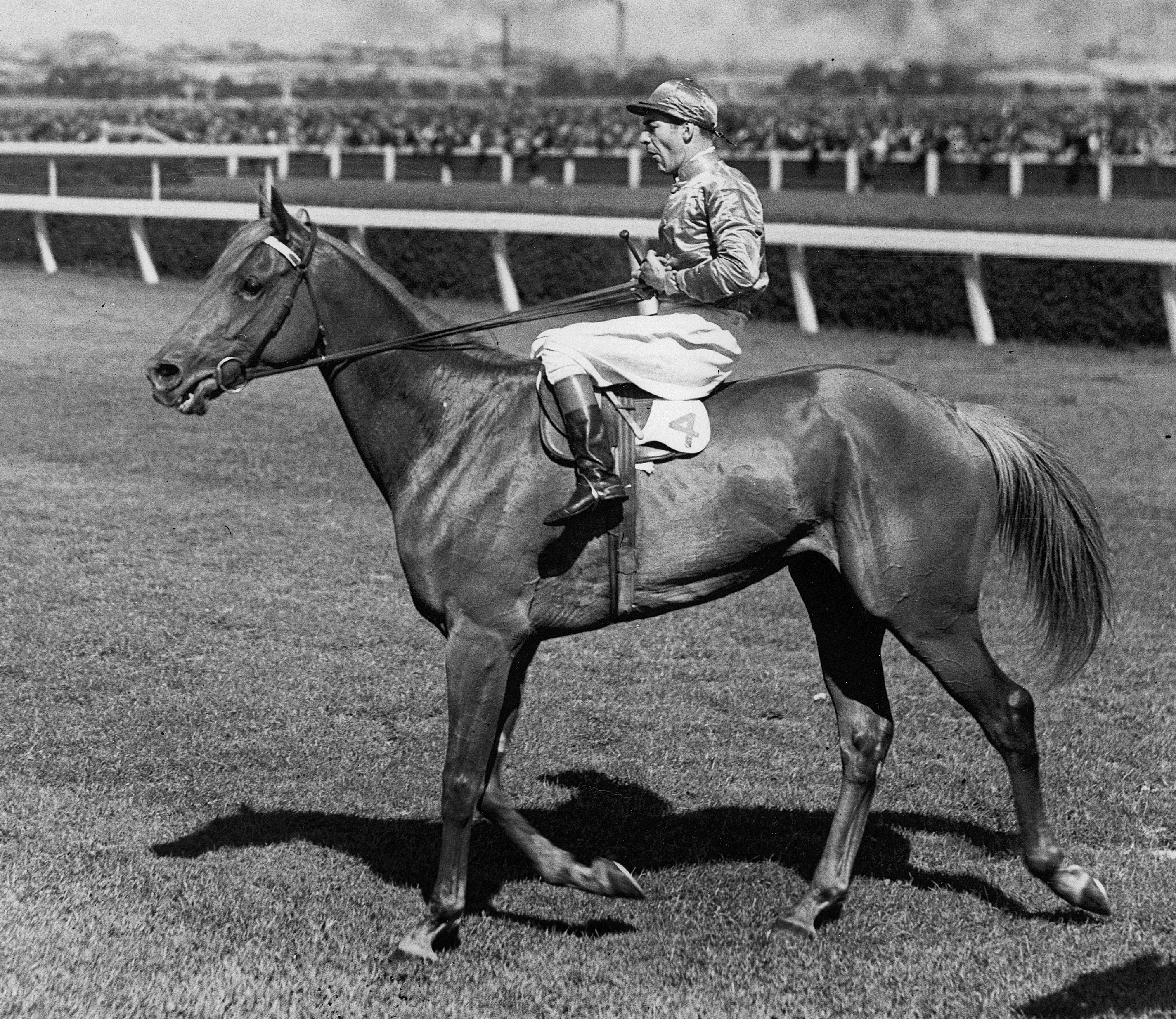
Peter Pan, 1932 and 1934 winner

The Melbourne Cup is an annual Group 1 Thoroughbred horse race held in Melbourne, Australia, at the Flemington Racecourse. It is a 3200-metre race for three-year-olds and older, conducted by the Victoria Racing Club that forms part of the Melbourne Spring Racing Carnival. It is the richest two-mile handicap in the world and one of the richest turf races. The event starts at 3:00 pm on the first Tuesday of November and is known locally as "the race that stops the nation."

The Melbourne Cup has cemented itself as a part of Melbourne and Australian culture, having been run every year since 1861. The day of the race has been a public holiday for much of Victoria since 1876. It was originally run over two mi (3.219 km) but was shortened to 3,200 m (1 mi 1,740 yd) in 1972 when Australia adopted the metric system. This reduced the distance by 18.688 m (61 ft 3 3/4 in), and Rain Lover's 1968 race record of 3:19.1 was accordingly adjusted to 3:17.9. The present record holder is the 1990 winner Kingston Rule with a time of 3:16.3.

== Qualifying and race conditions ==
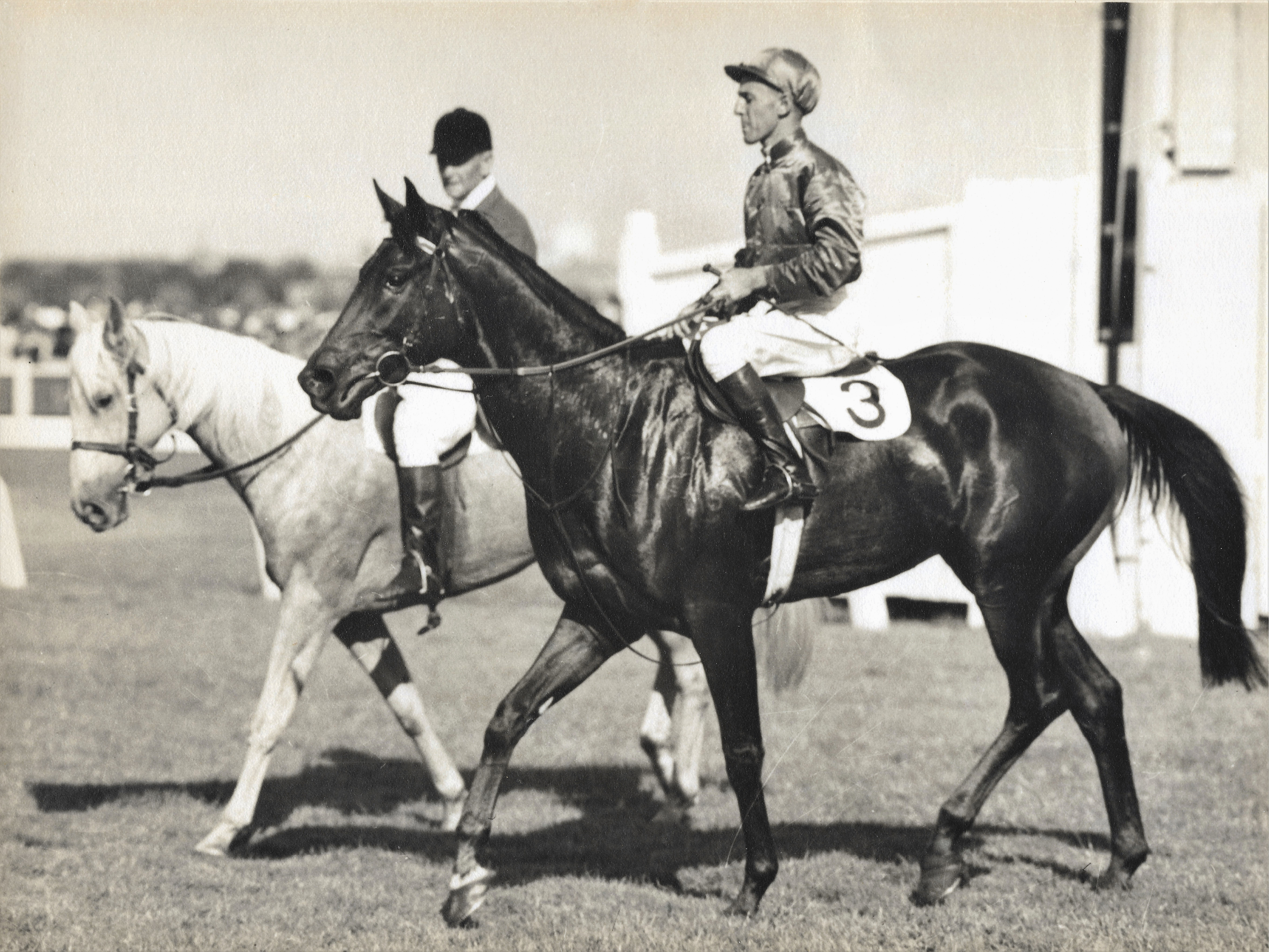
Delta, 1951 winner

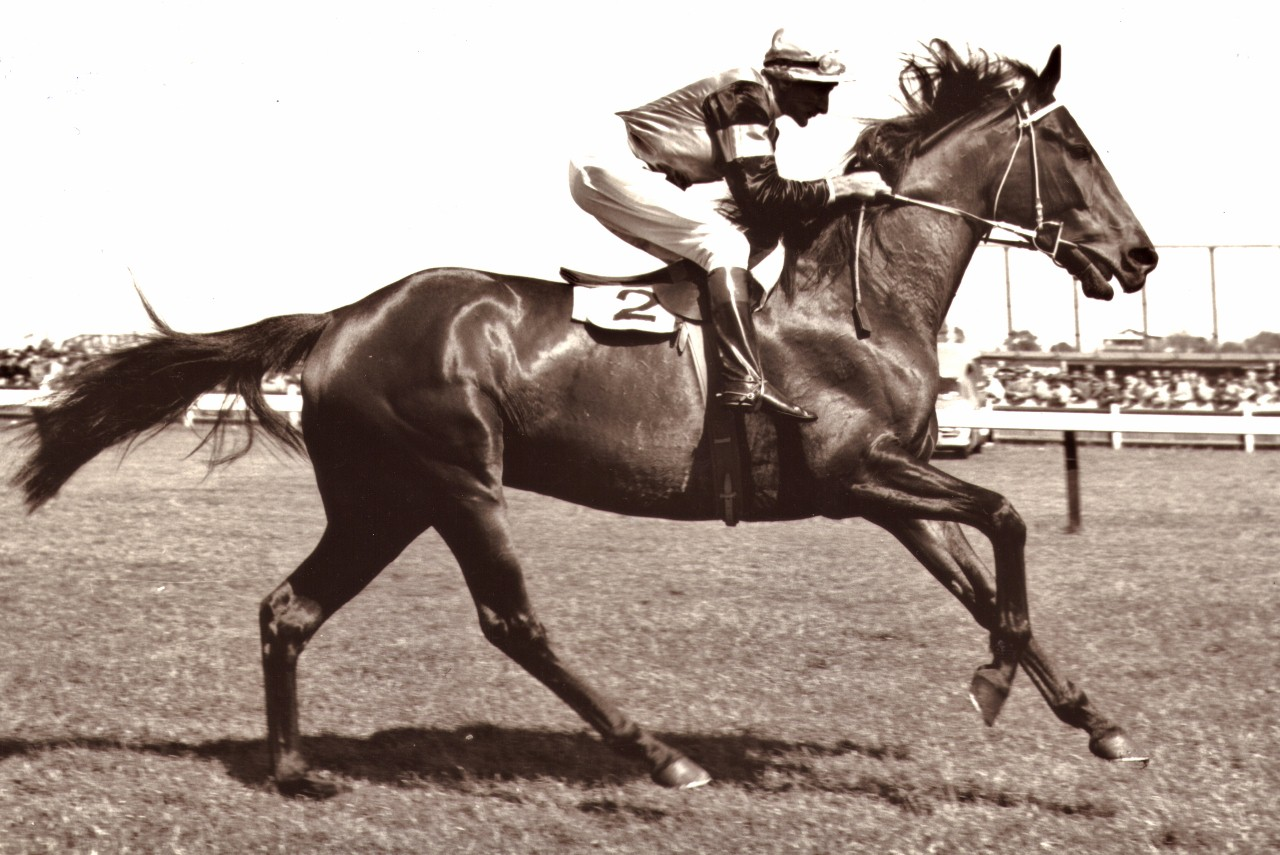
Rising Fast, 1954 winner

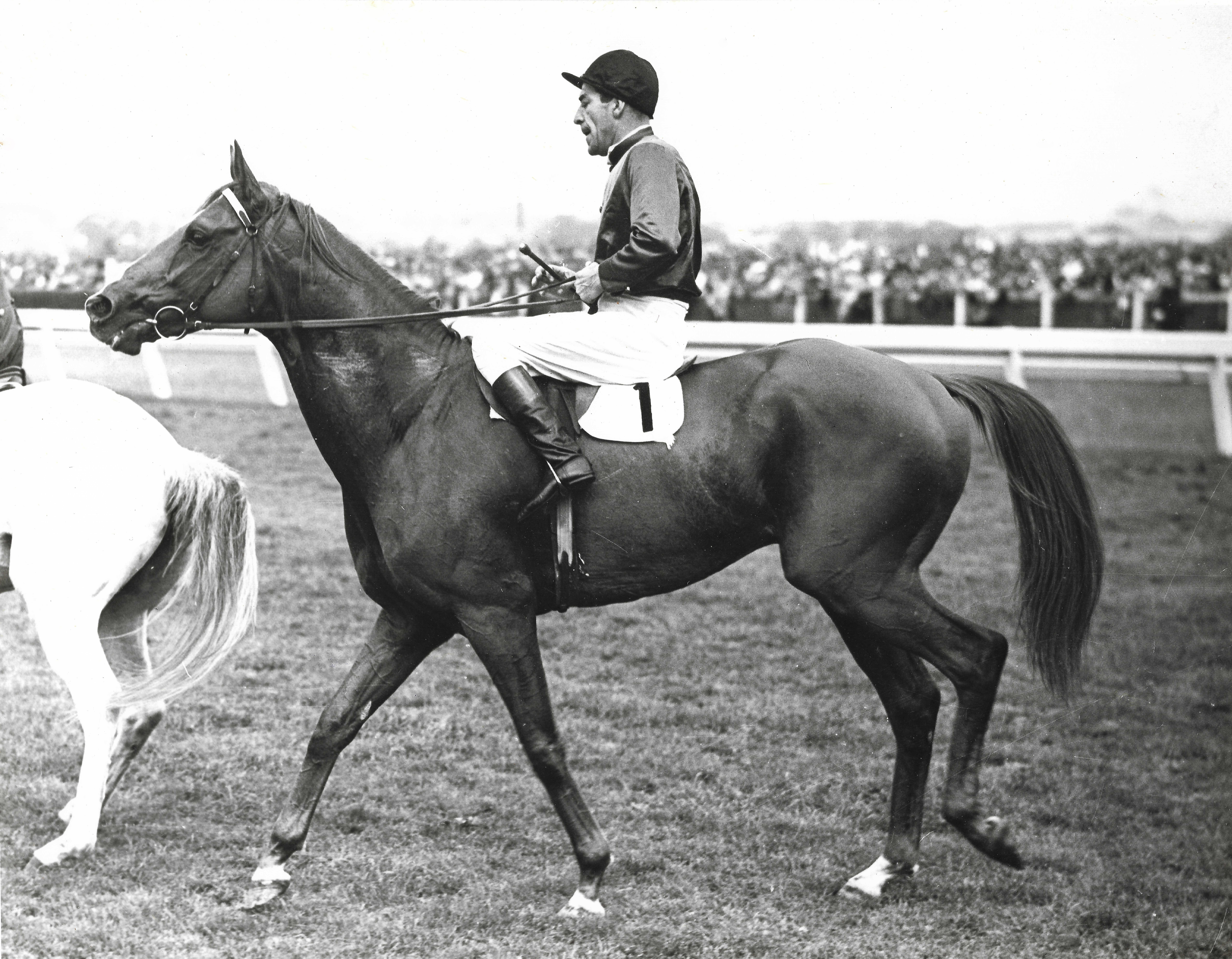
Russia, 1946 winner

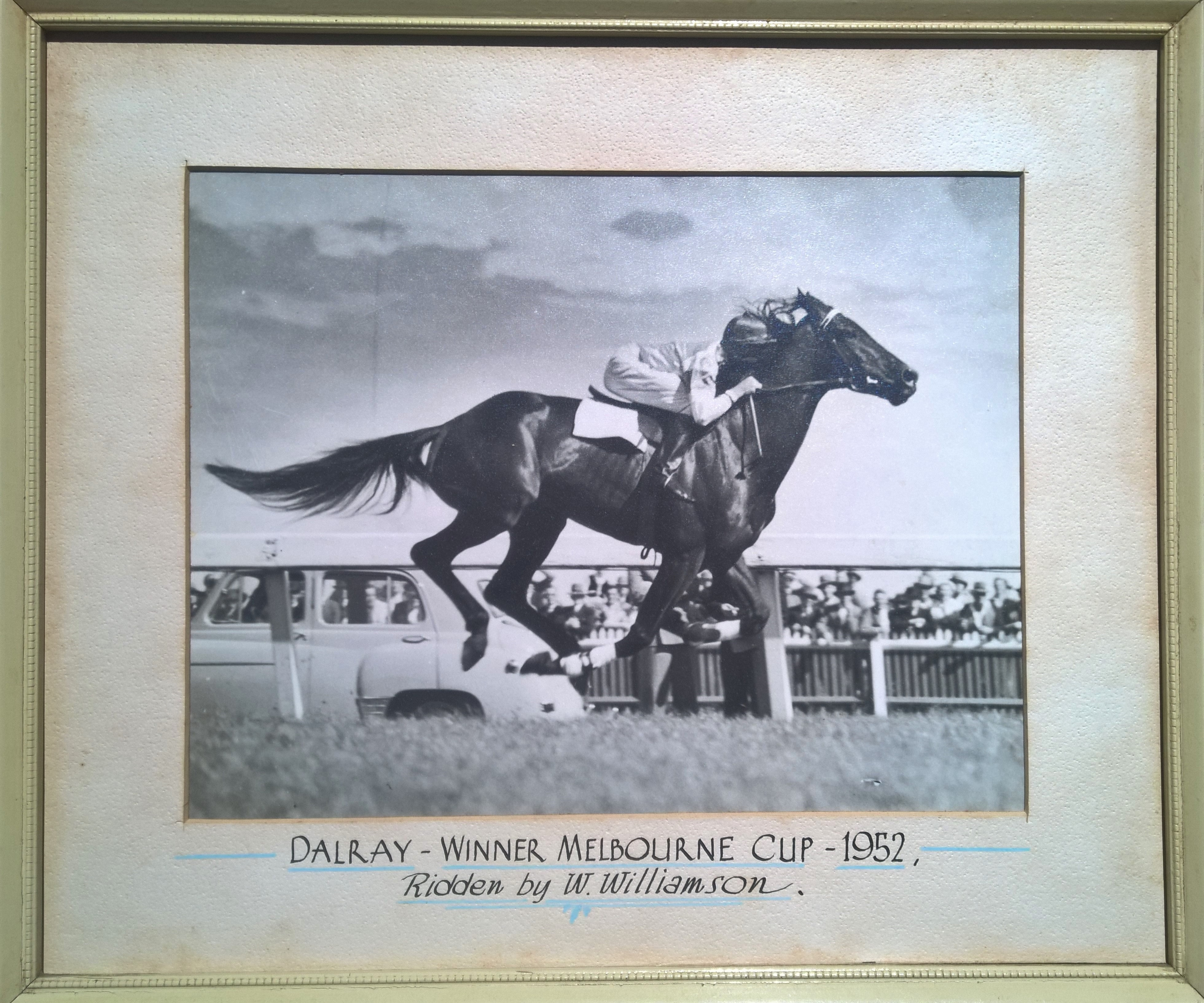
Dalray, 1952 winner

The race is a quality handicap for horses three years old and older, run over a distance of 3200 metres, on the first Tuesday in November at Flemington Racecourse. The minimum handicap weight is 50 kg. There is no maximum weight, but the top allocated weight must not be less than 57 kg. The weight allocated to each horse is declared by the VRC Handicapper in early September.

The Melbourne Cup race is a handicap contest in which the weight of the jockey and riding gear is adjusted with ballast to a nominated figure. Older horses carry more weight than younger ones and weights are adjusted further according to the horse's previous results. The field is selected based on a range of factors, including each horse's age, weight, and previous racing performance.

Weights were theoretically calculated to give each horse an equal winning chance in the past, but in recent years the rules were adjusted to a "quality handicap" formula where superior horses are given less severe weight penalties than under pure handicap rules.

=== Weight penalties ===
After the declaration of weights for the Melbourne Cup, the winner of any handicap flat race of the advertised value of A$55,000 or over to the winner, or an internationally recognised Listed, Group, or Graded handicap flat race, shall carry such additional weight (if any), for each win, as the VRC Handicapper shall determine.

=== Fees ===
Entries for the Melbourne Cup usually close during the first week of August. The initial entry fee is $600 per horse. Around 300 to 400 horses are nominated each year, but the final field is limited to 24 starters. Following the allocation of weights, the owner of each horse must on the four occasions before the race in November declare the horse as an acceptor and pay a fee. First acceptance is $960, second acceptance is $1,450 and third acceptance is $2,420. The final acceptance fee, on the Saturday prior to the race, is $45,375. Should a horse be balloted out of the final field, the final declaration fee is refunded.

=== Balloting conditions ===
The race directors may exclude any horse from the race or exempt any horse from the ballot on the race, but in order to reduce the field to the safety limit of 24, horses are balloted out based on a number of factors which include prize money earned in the previous two years, wins or placings in certain lead-up races and allocated handicap weight.

The winners of the following races are exempt from any ballot:

- Lexus Stakes (formerly Saab Quality and registered as The Hotham Handicap)
- Cox Plate
- Caulfield Cup
- The Bart Cummings (from 2015)
- Andrew Ramsden Stakes (from 2019)
- Ebor Handicap (from 2019)
- The Roy Higgins Quality (from 2022)
- Geelong Cup
- Moonee Valley Gold Cup
- Belmont Gold Cup Stakes
- Prix Kergorlay (from 2026)

The limitation of 24 starters is stated explicitly to be for safety reasons. However, in the past far larger numbers were allowed – the largest field ever raced was 39 runners in 1890.

=== Quarantine ===
International horses (except from New Zealand) entering Australia must undergo quarantine in an approved premises in their own country for a minimum period of 14 days before travelling to Australia. Premises must meet the Australian Government Standards. The Werribee International Horse Centre at Werribee Racecourse is the Victorian quarantine station for international horses competing in the Melbourne Spring Racing Carnival. The facility has stabling for up to 24 horses in five separate stable complexes and is located 32 km from the Melbourne CBD.

== Prize money and trophies ==
=== Prize money ===
The total prize money for the 2023 race was A$8,410,000, plus an 18-carat solid gold trophy weighing 1.69 kg and valued at $600,000 to the winner. The first 12 past the post receive prize money, with the winner being paid $4.4 million, second $1.1 million, third $550,000, fourth $350,000, fifth $230,000, with sixth through to twelfth place earning $160,000. Prize money is distributed to the connections of each horse in the ratio of 85 percent to the owner, 10 percent to the trainer and 5 percent to the jockey.

The 1985 Melbourne Cup, won by What a Nuisance, was the first race run in Australia with prize money of $1 million.

| Year | Prize money |
|---|---|
| 2026 | $10,200,000 |
| 2025 | $10,000,000 |
| 2024 | $8,560,000 |
| 2023 | $8,410,000 |
| 2022 | $8,000,000 |
| 2021 | $8,000,000 |
| 2020 | $8,000,000 |
| 2019 | $8,000,000 |
| 2018 | $7,300,000 |
| 2017 | $6,200,000 |
| 2016 | $6,200,000 |
| 2015 | $6,200,000 |
| 2014 | $6,200,000 |
| 2013 | $6,200,000 |
| 2012 | $6,200,000 |
| 2011 | $6,175,000 |
| 2010 | $6,000,000 |
| 2009 | $5,500,000 |
| 2008 | $5,500,000 |
| 2007 | $5,000,000 |
| 2006 | $5,000,000 |
| 2005 | $5,000,000 |
| 2004 | $4,600,000 |

=== Trophies ===
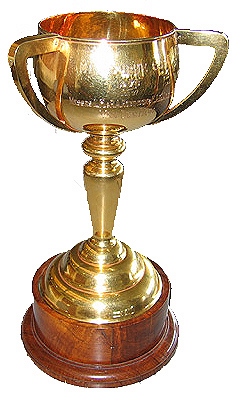
The 1976 cup won by Van der Hum

The winner of the first Melbourne Cup in 1861 received a gold watch. The first Melbourne Cup trophy was awarded in 1865 and was an elaborate silver bowl on a stand that had been manufactured in England. This is currently owned by Australian wine personality Wolf Blass and is on display at the Wolf Blass Gallery & Museum/Adelaide Hills Wine Bar in Hahndorf, South Australia. The first existing and un-altered Melbourne Cup is from 1866, presented to the owners of The Barb; as of 2013, it is in the National Museum of Australia. The silver trophy presented in 1867, now also in the National Museum of Australia, was also made in England, but jewellers in Victoria complained to the Victorian Racing Club that the trophy should have been made locally. They believed the work of a Melburnian, William Edwards, to be superior in both design and workmanship to the English-made trophy. No trophy was awarded to the Melbourne Cup winner for the next eight years.

In 1876, Edward Fischer, an immigrant from Austria, produced the first Australian-made trophy. It was an Etruscan shape with two handles. One side depicted a horse race with the grandstand and hill of Flemington in the background. The opposite side had the words "Melbourne Cup, 1876" and the name of the winning horse. A silver-plated base sporting three silver horses was added in 1888, but in 1891 the prize changed to being a 15 in-high (380 mm), 24 in-long (610 mm) trophy showing a Victory figure offering an olive wreath to a jockey. From 1899, the trophy was in the form of silver galloping horse embossed on a 3 ft-long (0.9 m) plaque, although it was said to look like a greyhound by some people.

The last Melbourne Cup trophy manufactured in England was made for the 1914 event. It was a chalice centred on a long base which had a horse at each end. The trophy awarded in 1916, the first gold trophy, was a three-legged, three-armed rose bowl. The three-handled loving cup design was first awarded in 1919. In that year, the Victorian Racing Club had commissioned James Steeth to design a trophy that would be in keeping with the prestige of the race, little realising that it would become the iconic Melbourne Cup still presented today. In the Second World War years (1942, 1943 and 1944), the winning owner received war bonds valued at 200 pounds.

A new trophy is struck each year and becomes the property of the winning owner. In the event of a dead heat, a second cup is on hand. The present trophy is hand spun from 1.65 kg of 18-carat gold. The winning trainer and jockey also receive a miniature replica of the cup (since 1973) and the strapper is awarded the Tommy Woodcock Trophy, named after the strapper of Phar Lap.

==== Melbourne Cup Tour ====
In 2003, an annual tour of the Melbourne Cup trophy was initiated to provide communities across Australia and New Zealand with an opportunity to view the Cup trophy and highlight the contribution the Melbourne Cup has made to Australia's social, sporting and racing culture. Each year, communities in Australia and New Zealand apply for the cup to tour their community and the tour also takes in cities around the world as part of the Victoria Racing Club's strategy to promote the Melbourne Cup and the Melbourne Cup Carnival internationally.

The Tour has visited schools and aged-care and hospital facilities, and participated in community events and celebrations including race days across Australia and New Zealand.

== History ==
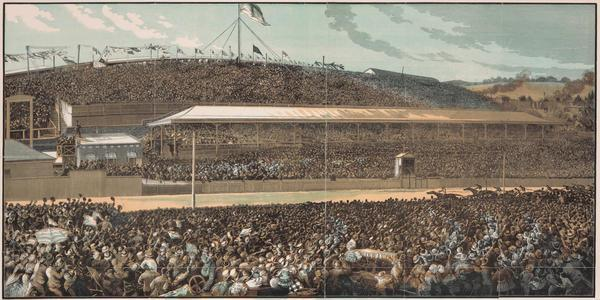
Melbourne Cup in 1881, with engraving on the finish line

=== Early years ===
Frederick Standish, member of the Victorian Turf Club and steward on the day of the first Cup, was credited with forming the idea to hold a horse race and calling it the "Melbourne Cup".

Seventeen horses contested the first Melbourne Cup on Thursday 7 November 1861, racing for the modest prize of 710 gold sovereigns (£710) cash and a hand-beaten gold watch, winner takes all. The prize was not, as some have suggested, the largest purse up to that time. A large crowd of 4,000 men and women watched the race, although it has been suggested this was less than expected because of news reaching Melbourne of the death of explorers Burke and Wills five days earlier on 2 November. Nevertheless, the attendance was the largest at Flemington on any day for the past two years, with the exception of the recently run Two Thousand Guinea Stakes.

The winner of this first Melbourne Cup race was a 16.3 hand bay stallion by the name of Archer in a time of 3.52.00, ridden by John Cutts, trained by Etienne de Mestre, and leased (and consequently raced in his own name) by de Mestre. As a lessee de Mestre owned and was fully responsible for Archer during the lease. Archer was leased from the "Exeter Farm" of Jembaicumbene near Braidwood, New South Wales. His owners were Thomas John "Tom" Roberts (a good school-friend of de Mestre's), Rowland H. Hassall (Roberts' brother-in-law), and Edmund Molyneux Royds and William Edward Royds (Roberts' nephews).

The inaugural Melbourne Cup of 1861 was an eventful affair when one horse bolted before the start, and three of the seventeen starters fell during the race, two of which died. Archer, a Sydney outsider who drew scant favour in the betting, spread-eagled the field and defeated the favourite, and Victorian champion, Mormon by six lengths. Dismissed by the bookies, Archer took a lot of money away from Melbourne, 'refuelling interstate rivalry' and adding to the excitement of the Cup. The next day, Archer was raced in and won another 2-mile long-distance race, the Melbourne Town Plate.

It has become legend that Archer walked over 800 km (over 500 miles) to Flemington from de Mestre's stable at "Terara" near Nowra, New South Wales. However, newspaper archives of the day reveal that he had travelled south from Sydney to Melbourne on the steamboat City of Melbourne, together with de Mestre, and two of de Mestre's other horses Exeter and Inheritor. Before being winched aboard the steamboat for the trip to Melbourne, the horses had arrived in Sydney in September 1861.

Archer travelled to Melbourne by steamboat again the following year (1862) to run in the second Melbourne Cup. This time he won 810 gold sovereigns (£810) cash and a gold watch before a crowd of 7,000, nearly twice the size of the previous years large crowd in a time of 3.47.00, taking to two the number of Melbourne Cup wins by this horse. Archer had already won the 1862 AJC Queen Elizabeth Stakes in Randwick, Sydney, and returned to win his second Melbourne Cup carrying 10 stone 2 pounds. He defeated a field of twenty starters by eight lengths, a record that has never been beaten, and that was not matched for over 100 years. Mormon again running second. Winning the Melbourne Cup twice was a feat not repeated until more than seventy years later when Peter Pan won the race in 1932 and 1934, and winning the Melbourne Cup two years in a row was a feat not repeated until more than 30 years later when Rain Lover won in 1968 and 1969.

Archer travelled to Melbourne by steamboat yet again the next year (1863). Despite his weight of 11 stone 4 pounds, Archer would have contested the third cup in 1863, but due to a Victorian public holiday trainer Etienne de Mestre's telegraphed acceptance form arrived late, and Archer was scratched on a technicality. In protest of this decision and in a show of solidarity, many of de Mestre's owners boycotted the third race and scratched their horses in sympathy. As a result, the Melbourne Cup of that year ran with only 7 starters, the smallest number in the history of the Cup.

In 1865, Adam Lindsay Gordon wrote a verse in which the Melbourne Cup winner was called Tim Whiffler. Two years later in 1867 two horses with the name Tim Whiffler ran in the Melbourne Cup. (The year before in 1866 two horses with the same name, Falcon, also ran in the Melbourne Cup.) To distinguish between the two Tim Whifflers they were called "Sydney" Tim Whiffler and "Melbourne" Tim Whiffler. "Sydney" Tim Whiffler actually won the Cup. He was trained by Etienne de Mestre, and like Archer before him raced in de Mestre's name but was leased from the "Exeter Farm".

As early as 1865, Cup day was a half-holiday in Melbourne for public servants and bank officials. Various businesses also closed at lunchtime.

It took some years before the purpose of the declared holiday was acknowledged in the Victoria Government Gazette. The Gazette of 31 October 1873 announced that the following Thursday (Cup Day) be observed as a bank and civil (public) service holiday.

The Melbourne Cup was first run on a Tuesday in 1875, the first Tuesday in that month.

On 7 November 1876, the three-year-old filly, Briseis, owned and trained by James Wilson Snr., won in a time of 3.36.25. Briseis then went on to create a record that is never likely to be equalled, winning the VRC Derby, the Melbourne Cup and the VRC Oaks in the space of six days. She was ridden in the Melbourne Cup by the tiny featherweight figure of jockey Peter St Albans. In 1876 at the recorded age thirteen (he was actually twelve, being 8 days short of his thirteenth birthday), Peter St Albans is also the youngest person ever to win a Melbourne Cup. Before 75,000 at Flemington Briseis, with St Albans in the saddle, comfortably won by 1 length in the biggest field of all time. "At 4 o'clock the starter released the 33 runners and they swept down the long Flemington straight in a thundering rush. Briseis, ridden by what one writer termed a mere child, (in the Cup) captured a rare double, the Victoria Race Club Derby and the Melbourne Cup. Shouts and hurrahs were heard, hats were thrown in the air and one excited individual fell on his back in the attempt to do a somersault. The boy who rode the winner was carried around the pack and is the hero of the day," reported the "Australasian Sketcher" in 1876. Both Peter St Albans and Briseis have now become racing legends, and Briseis is regarded as one of the greatest mares foaled in Australia.

Briseis wasn't the only sensation surrounding the 1876 Melbourne Cup. Two months before the event, on Saturday 9 September, the City of Melbourne sailed for Melbourne from Sydney with a cargo including 13 racehorses, many of whom were considered serious contenders for the Melbourne Cup. The following day the ship ran into a savage storm and was hit by several rogue waves, with Nemesis (the winner of the 1876 AJC Metropolitan Handicap in Randwick, Sydney and favourite for the Cup, owned by John Moffat) and Robin Hood (another favourite, owned by Etienne de Mestre) being among the 11 horses that were killed. Betting on the big race was paralysed. To the dismay and anger of the public, bookmakers, showing no feeling, presented a purse (loaded with coins) to the captain as token of their appreciation for his part in saving them many thousands of pounds in bets already laid on the favourites who had perished. Perhaps they should have kept their money, however. The outsider Briseis comfortably won by 1 length in the biggest field of all time and in an extremely good time, so it is unlikely that the horses who perished could have beaten her.

1877 is also the year that the trainer Etienne de Mestre won his fourth Melbourne Cup with Chester owned by Hon. James White. In 1878, as in previous years, De Mestre fielded more than one horse. He entered the favourite Firebell (owned by W. S. Cox) who finished last, Chester (owned by Hon. James White) the previous year's winner who fell, and Calamia (owned by de Mestre) who, though less fancied, won easily by two lengths. First prize was £1,790, the crowd was 80,000 and there were 30 starters. De Mestre's 1878 win with Calamia brought to 5 the number of Melbourne Cups he had won. This record was not to be matched for nearly 100 years when the trainer Bart Cummings won his fifth Melbourne Cup in 1975. Bart Cummings, regarded as the best Australian horse trainer of all time, went on to win 12 Melbourne Cups to 2008.

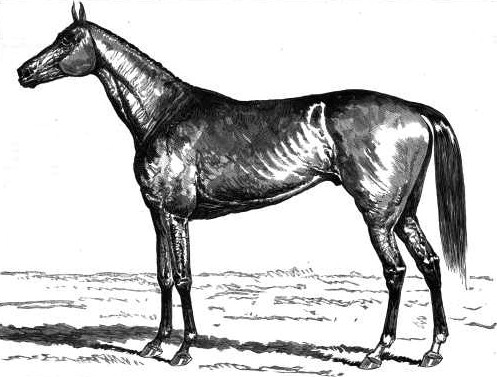
Martini-Henry, the 1883 Melbourne Cup winner

In 1883, the hardy New Zealand bred, Martini-Henry won the VRC Derby, the Melbourne Cup and on the following Monday retained his undefeated record by winning Mares' Produce Stakes.

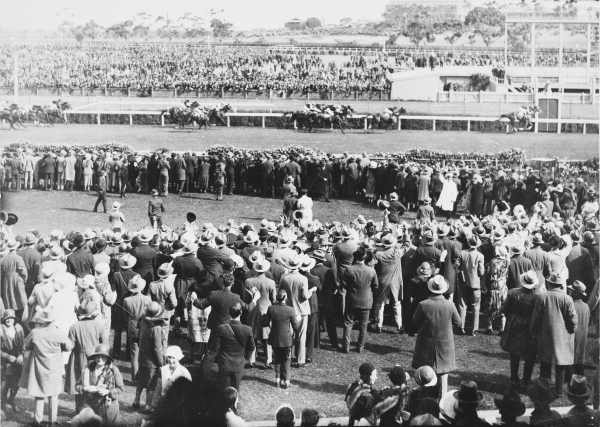
Phar Lap winning the Melbourne Cup Race from Second Wind and Shadow King on 5 November 1930

Phar Lap, the most famous horse in the world of his day, won the 1930 Melbourne Cup at 11/8 odds on, the shortest-priced favourite in the history of the race. He had to be hidden away at Geelong before the race after an attempt was made to shoot him and only emerged an hour before the race time of the Cup. Phar Lap also competed in 1929 and 1931, but came 3rd and 8th respectively, despite heavy favouritism in both years.

There are a few legends of the first Aboriginal jockey to ride in a Melbourne Cup. It was believed to be John Cutts who won the first and second cups in 1861 and 1862 riding archer. He was reputedly an Aboriginal stockman born in the area where Archer was trained but was actually John 'Cutts' Dillon, the son of a Sydney clerk, a jockey who rode for many trainers in his long career, and who was one of the best known, best-liked and most respected jockeys in New South Wales. It is thought that Peter St Albans was the first Aboriginal jockey to win the cup, on Briseis in 1876. Because St Albans was not quite 13 years old, the jockey was too young to ride in the cup. Thus, to allow him to race Briseis in the Cup, it was argued his birthdate and parents were unknown, and from this, the legend of him being Aboriginal grew. Both these legends, however, can definitely be disproved, and history had to wait nearly another 100 years. The first jockey of Indigenous heritage to ride a Melbourne Cup winner was Frank Reys in 1973 on Gala Supreme, who had a Filipino father and a half-Aboriginal mother.

=== Recent years ===
The race has undergone several alterations in recent years, the most visible being the entry of many foreign-trained horses. Most have failed to cope with the conditions; the three successful "foreign raids" include two by Irish trainer Dermot K. Weld successful in 1993 and 2002, and one in 2006 by Katsumi Yoshida of Japan's renowned Yoshida racing and breeding family. The attraction for foreigners to compete was, primarily, the low-profile change to the new "quality handicap" weighting system. The 1910 Melbourne Cup was won by Comedy King, the first foreign bred horse to do so. Subsequent foreign-bred horses to win Cup were Backwood, 1924; Phar Lap, 1930; Wotan, 1936; Beldale Ball, 1980; At Talaq, 1986; Kingston Rule, 1990; Vintage Crop, 1993; Jeune, 1994; Media Puzzle, 2002; Makybe Diva, 2003, 2004, 2005; Americain, 2010; and Dunaden, 2011.

The 1938 Melbourne Cup was won by trainer Mrs. Allan McDonald, who conditioned Catalogue. Mrs McDonald was a successful trainer in New Zealand; however, at the time, women were not allowed to compete as trainers in Australia, so her husband's name was officially recorded as the winning trainer. The 2001 edition was won by New Zealand mare Ethereal, trained by Sheila Laxon, the first woman to formally train a Melbourne Cup winner. She also won the Caulfield Cup, a 2,400-metre race also held in Melbourne, and therefore has won the "Cups Double".

Maree Lyndon became the first female to ride in the Melbourne Cup, when she partnered Argonaut Style in 1987, in which she ran second-last place in the 21-horse field.

In 2004, Makybe Diva became the first mare to win two cups, and also the first horse to win with different trainers, after David Hall moved to Hong Kong and transferred her to the Lee Freedman stables.

The 2005 Melbourne Cup was held before a crowd of 106,479. Makybe Diva made history by becoming the only horse to win the race three times. Trainer Lee Freedman said after the race, "Go and find the youngest child on the course because that's the only person here who will have a chance of seeing this happen again in their lifetime."

Due to the 2007 Australian equine influenza outbreak, believed to have been started by a horse brought into Australia from Japan, neither Delta Blues nor Pop Rock participated in the 2007 Melbourne Cup. Both horses had been stabled in Japan. Corowa, NSW-trained "Leica Falcon" also was not permitted to race in Victoria despite Corowa being close to the Victorian border. Leica Falcon was ordained as the new staying star of Australian racing in 2005 when he ran fourth in both the Caulfield Cup and in Makybe Diva's famous third Melbourne Cup victory. But serious leg injuries saw the horse not race for another 20 months. Efficient, the previous year's VRC Derby winner, won the race.

In 2013, Damien Oliver returned from an eight-month ban, after betting against his own mount at a previous race meet, to win his 3rd Melbourne cup.

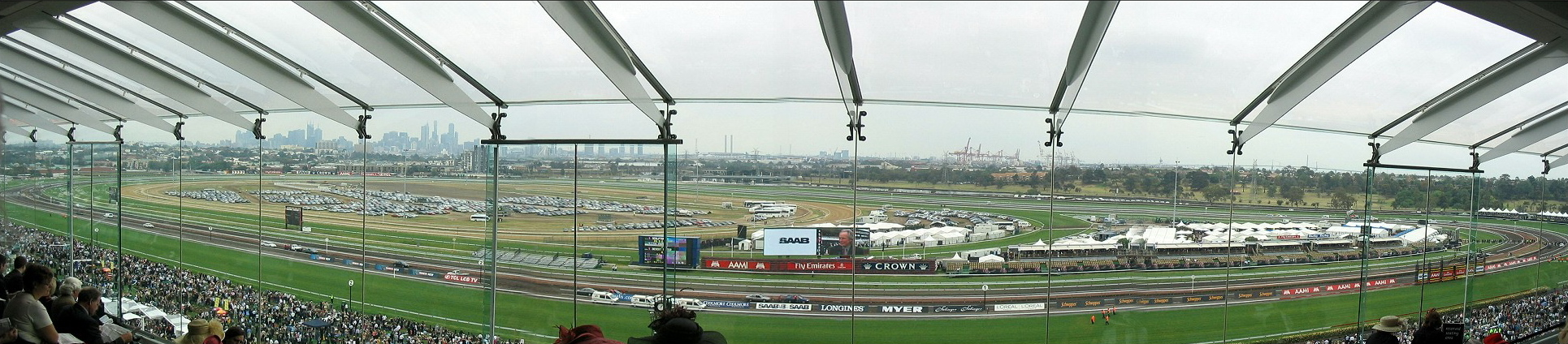
140-degree panorama of the racecourse

== The Cup ==
In 2016, ABC Bullion, a Pallion company, was awarded the rights to make the Melbourne Cup. The winning trophy contains 1.65 kg of 18-carat gold estimated at over $200,000. The cup is produced by W. J. Sanders, a sister division within Pallion and takes over 250 hours to produce. W. J. Sanders has produced each Melbourne Cup from 2016 to present.

=== Timeline of notable events ===
- 1861 – The first Melbourne Cup, won by Archer, was contested by 17 runners. A horse bolted prior to the start and three horses fell during the running. Two were put down.
- 1862 – Archer became the first horse to win the race twice.
- 1863 – The smallest-ever Melbourne Cup field of only seven runners contested the race after several horses were scratched in sympathy with Etienne de Mestre's champion Archer being ruled out of the race on a technicality.
- 1869 – The Victorian Racing Club introduced the four-day Spring Racing Carnival format.
- 1870 – The race was postponed a week.
- 1875 – The first time the race was held on the first Tuesday in November.
- 1876 – The youngest jockey in the history of the race, Peter St Albans, won on Briseis aged 13 (officially), but he was actually 12 years 11 months 23 days.
- 1881 – Jockey John Dodd died as a result of injuries received while riding Suwarrow in the race
- 1882 – The first bookmakers were licensed at Flemington.
- 1888 – The first Gold whip was presented to the winning Cup jockey (Mick O'Brien).
- 1890 – The largest-ever Melbourne Cup field, of 39 runners, contested the race with the champion Carbine winning and setting a weight-carrying record of 10 st 5 lb (66 kg), which is unlikely to ever be beaten. He carried 53 lb (24 kg) more than the second-placed horse, Highborn.
- 1894 – Strand starts were introduced to Flemington.
- 1896 – The Melbourne Cup was first filmed. This race was won by Newhaven.
- 1915 – First woman owner to win was Mrs E. A. Widdis with Patrobas.
- 1916 – The race was postponed until the following Saturday.
- 1925 – The first radio broadcast of the Melbourne Cup was made by the Australian Broadcasting Company.
- 1930 – The legendary Phar Lap won his first Melbourne Cup (after a 3rd-place finish the previous year), as the shortest-priced favourite in history and the only favourite to win at 'odds on' (8/11).
- 1931 – The first year the totalisator operated at the Melbourne Cup. The Totalisator Agency Board was introduced in 1961. It was also the last of 3 Melbourne Cups that Phar Lap contested, where the handicappers allotted him 10 st 10 lb (68 kg), the heaviest weight ever carried in the race. He only managed to finish 8th behind winner White Nose.
- 1941 – Skipton would become the final three-year-old to win the race. At the time, three-year-olds had won more Melbourne Cups than any other age group, but changes to qualifying conditions resulted in less three-year-olds contesting the race.
- 1942–44 – The Melbourne Cup was run on Saturdays during the war years.
- 1948 – The photo finish camera was first used in Melbourne Cup. Rimfire beat Dark Marne. However, many on-course punters believe the result should have been reversed, and it was later found that the camera was incorrectly aligned.
- 1958 – The first Cup start from starting stalls.
- 1960 – For the first time the race was televised live to Sydney.
- 1962 – "Fashions on the Field" was first held at the Carnival.
- 1971 – For the first time the race was televised live internationally, to New Zealand.
- 1972 – The Melbourne Cup distance was updated to the metric 3,200 metres from the previous imperial distance of 2 miles, which meant the race effectively became 18.6 metres shorter. The race was won by the George Hanlon–trained 40:1 outsider Piping Lane ridden by John Letts and carrying only 48 kg.
- 1978 – For the first time the race was televised live in Victoria, its home state, through ATV-0
- 1985 – The first sponsored Melbourne Cup, and the first million-dollar Cup, with $650,000 for the winner.
- 1987 – First female jockey to ride in the cup was Maree Lyndon on Argonaut Style.

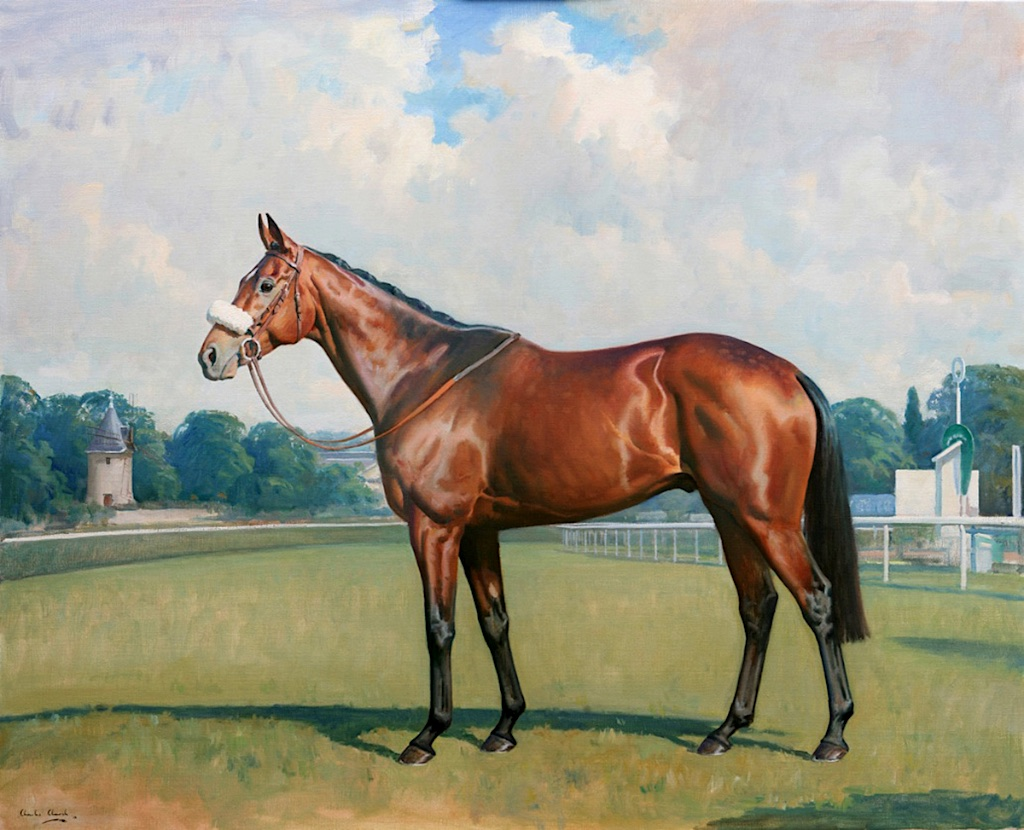
Dunaden: 2011 Melbourne Cup winner, painted by Charles Church

- 1993 – The Dermot Weld–trained Irish gelding Vintage Crop became the first Northern hemisphere–trained horse to win the Melbourne Cup and the first Irish horse.
- 2001 – Sheila Laxon was the first woman trainer to officially win the Melbourne Cup. However, Mrs. A. McDonald (1938) with Catalogue was really the first woman trainer to win. Women then could not be registered as trainers in Australia, and it was her husband who was the registered trainer. Mrs. McDonald's win was also as a female trainer of a female-owned horse.
- 2003 – First Australian female jockey to ride in the Cup was Clare Lindop on Debben.
- 2003 – The first Melbourne Cup Tour was conducted around Australia, and the biggest crowd, of 122,736, is recorded at Flemington.
- 2005 – Makybe Diva became the only horse so far to win the Melbourne Cup three times.
- 2008 – The "Cup King", Bart Cummings, took his 12th win in the Melbourne Cup with Viewed
- 2010 – 150th anniversary. Americain becomes the first French-trained horse to win the race, and Gerald Mosse the first French jockey.
- 2011 – French-based horse Dunaden wins from Red Cadeaux in the closest finish ever.
- 2012 – The first seven finishers in the race were bred in Ireland.
- 2013 – Gai Waterhouse became the first Australian female trainer to train the winner of the race when Fiorente won. Her father, legendary trainer Tommy J. Smith, was also a Melbourne Cup–winning trainer (Toparoa in 1955 and Just A Dash in 1981).
- 2014 – Two horses die due to racing in the 2014 Melbourne Cup. Cup favourite Admire Rakti, who was carrying the heaviest weight since Think Big (1975), died of heart failure in his stall after the race, and Araldo broke his leg and was euthanised after being spooked by a flag in the crowd after the race.
- 2015 – First woman jockey to win the cup was Michelle Payne on Prince of Penzance, who became only the fourth horse to win at odds of 100:1. Red Cadeaux, the only horse to finish second in the race on three occasions, and a public favourite, did not finish due to a fetlock injury and was euthanised 2 weeks later.
- 2016 – Lloyd Williams becomes the first owner to have five Melbourne Cup winners and jockey Kerrin McEvoy the jockey with the greatest timespan between his first and second Melbourne Cup winners (16 years between 2000 and 2016) as Almandin wins the cup narrowly over Heartbreak City.
- 2017 – Rekindling (foaled 23 March 2014) becomes the first three-year-old to win the Melbourne Cup since Skipton in 1941; however, he was classed a four-year-old in the southern hemisphere.
- 2018 – Cross Counter, a four-year-old gelding (male) ridden by jockey Kerrin McEvoy and trained by Charlie Appleby from Great Britain wins. The CliffsofMoher was euthanised after it suffered a fractured right shoulder and couldn't be saved.
- 2021 – Verry Elleegant becomes the first horse in 161 runnings of the Melbourne Cup to win from barrier 18.
- 2025 – Second female jockey, Jamie Melham, on Half Yours wins the Melbourne Cup ten years after the first female winner. The first US-trained horse to run in the Melbourne Cup finished 20th out of 24 starters.

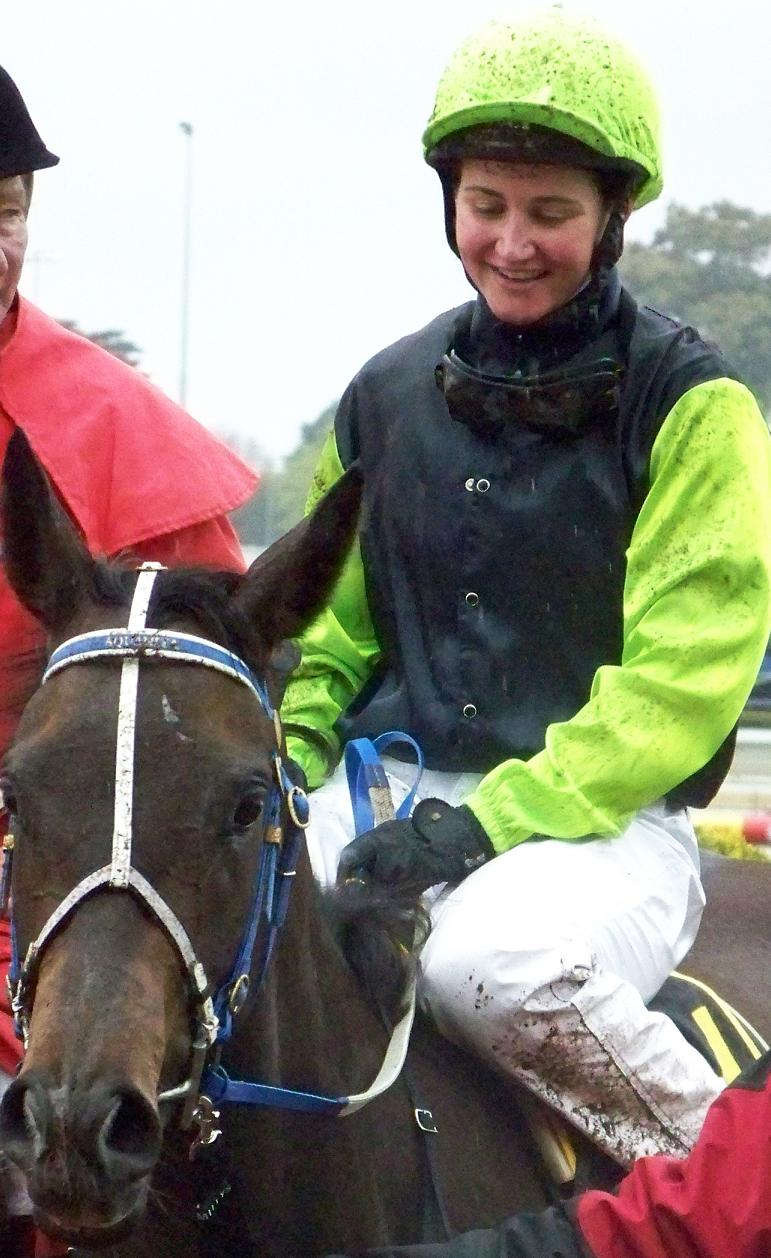
Michelle Payne, was the first woman jockey to win the Melbourne Cup

== Results and records ==
=== Most wins by a horse ===
- 3 – Makybe Diva (2003, 2004, 2005)
- 2 – Think Big (1974, 1975)
- 2 – Rain Lover (1968, 1969)
- 2 – Peter Pan (1932, 1934)
- 2 – Archer (1861, 1862)

=== Most wins by a jockey ===
- 4 – Bobbie Lewis (1902, 1915, 1919, 1927)
- 4 – Harry White (1974, 1975, 1978, 1979)
- 3 – Glen Boss (2003, 2004, 2005)
- 3 – Jim Johnson (1963, 1968, 1969)
- 3 – Kerrin McEvoy (2000, 2016, 2018)
- 3 – William H. McLachlan (1909, 1910, 1917)
- 3 – Darby Munro (1934, 1944, 1946)
- 3 – Damien Oliver (1995, 2002, 2013)
- 3 – Jack Purtell (1947, 1953, 1954)

=== Most wins by a trainer ===
- 12 – Bart Cummings (1965, 1966, 1967, 1974, 1975, 1977, 1979, 1990, 1991, 1996, 1999, 2008)
- 5 – Etienne de Mestre (1861, 1862, 1867, 1877, 1878)
- 5 – Lee Freedman (1989, 1992, 1995, 2004, 2005)

=== Most wins by an owner ===
- 7 – Lloyd Williams (1981, 1985, 2007, 2012, 2016, 2017, 2020)
- 4 – John Tait (1866, 1868, 1871, 1872)
- 4 – Etienne de Mestre (1861*, 1862*, 1867*, 1878) *The winners of these years were leased.
- 4 – Dato Tan Chin Nam (1974, 1975, 1996, 2008)

=== Other records ===
- First woman winning jockey – Michelle Payne (2015)
- Record winning time – 3.16.30 Kingston Rule (1990)
- Widest winning margin – 8 lengths by Archer in 1862 and Rain Lover in 1968.
- Heaviest weight carried by winner – Carbine in 1890 with 66 kg (10 st 5 lb) Makybe Diva holds the record for a mare with 58 kg in 2005. The horse to carry the heaviest weight of all time was Phar Lap (10 stone 10 pounds, or 68 kg) in 1931 when he ran 8th.
- Lightest weight carried by winner – Banker in 1863 with 34 kg (5 st 4 lb).
- Longest odds winners – Four horses have won at 100–1 : The Pearl (1871), Wotan (1936), Old Rowley (1940), and Prince of Penzance (2015).
- Shortest odds winner – Phar Lap at 8/11 in 1930.
- Favourites record – 34 of 150 favourites (23%) have won the Melbourne Cup.
- Most runners – 39 (1890)
- Fewest runners – 7 (1863)
- Most attempts – Shadow King made six attempts to win the cup in seven years between 1929 and 1935. He ran 6th, 3rd, 2nd, 3rd, 2nd, and 4th.
- Oldest winner — 8-year-old Toryboy in 1865, Catalogue in 1938, and Twilight Payment in 2020.

== Attendance ==
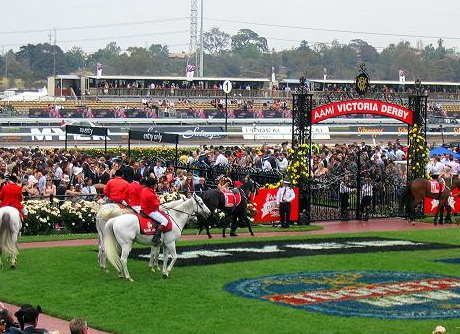
The horse show as well as fashion show of Melbourne Cup takes place on the lawn

The event is one of the most popular spectator events in Australia, with sometimes over 110,000 people in attendance, some dressed in traditional formal raceday wear and others in all manner of exotic and amusing costumes, attending the race. The record crowd was 122,736 in 2003. The 1926 running of the Cup was the first time the 100,000 mark had been passed. Today the record at Flemington is held by the 2006 Victoria Derby when almost 130,000 attended.

In 2007, a limit was placed on the Spring Carnival attendance at Flemington Racecourse, and race-goers are now required to pre-purchase tickets. Every year more and more people travel to Flemington Racecourse; in 2016, there was a 7.8 per cent increase in the number of out-of-state individuals (80,472) attending the Melbourne Cup Carnival.

The popularity of the Melbourne Cup has been declining in recent years; every Melbourne Cup after 2015 since has seen a decline in attendance, with the 2019 Melbourne Cup's crowd of 81,408 the race's smallest in decades. In the post-COVID-19 era, attendances at the Melbourne Cup increased each year from 2022 to 2024, before declining in 2025.

- 2026 – 97,112
- 2025 – 84,374
- 2024 – 91,168
- 2023 – 84,492
- 2022 – 73,816 (coldest Melbourne Cup Day since 1913)
- 2021 – 10,000 (attendance restricted due to the COVID-19 pandemic)
- 2020 – 0 (due to the COVID-19 pandemic, general public and owners were not allowed to enter Flemington Racecourse)
- 2019 – 81,408 (lowest crowd on Melbourne Cup Day since 1995)
- 2018 – 83,471
- 2017 – 90,536
- 2016 – 97,479
- 2015 – 101,015
- 2014 – 100,794
- 2013 – 104,169
- 2012 – 106,162
- 2011 – 105,979
- 2010 – 110,223
- 2009 – 102,161
- 2008 – 107,280
- 2007 – 102,411
- 2006 – 106,691
- 2005 – 106,479
- 2004 – 98,161
- 2003 – 122,736 (record)
- 2002 – 102,533
- 2001 – 92,477
- 2000 – 121,015
- 1999 – 104,028
- 1998 – 100,607
- 1997 – 94,143
- 1996 – 90,149
- 1995 – 74,843
- 1994 – 81,650
- 1993 – 74,766
- 1992 – 86,206
- 1991 – 94,632
- 1990 – 92,536
- 1989 – 96,722
- 1988 – 93,440
- 1987 – 81,012
- 1986 – 87,129
- 1985 – 79,126
- 1984 – 82,740
- 1983 – 80,776
- 1982 – 91,152
- 1981 – 87,641
- 1980 – 101,261

== Television broadcast ==
Since the introduction of television broadcasts in Australia during the 1950s, the Melbourne Cup has been broadcast regularly since the centenary race in 1960. The 1960 Melbourne Cup was the first interstate broadcast of the race, with three stations in Sydney showing the race live. The video recording of the race was shown on news broadcasts later that evening in Melbourne and Brisbane, after the tapes were transported. Live international broadcasts of the race began in 1971 when it was televised in New Zealand.

It wasn't until the 1978 Melbourne Cup that the race was permitted by the VRC to be shown live in Victoria, with Network 10 granted exclusive rights via ATV-0. Network Ten would be the official broadcast partner of the Melbourne Cup carnival from 1978 through to 2001. The Seven Network won the rights to broadcast the race from 2002, with caller Wayne Wilson criticised for his call of the 2002 race. Seven would retain exclusive coverage of the Melbourne Cup carnival until 2018, when the rights returned to Network Ten in a A$100m deal over five years.

As of 2024, the race is broadcast in Australia on the Nine Network and internationally through a number of broadcast partners. Nine entered into a five-year deal with the VRC in February 2024.

Australian free-to-air metropolitan television viewers since 2002
| Year | Metro Viewers | Rank | Network | Ref. |
|---|---|---|---|---|
| 2002 | 2.503 million | 4 | Seven Network | |
| 2003 | 2.244 million | 10 | Seven Network | |
| 2004 | 2.471 million | 5 | Seven Network | |
| 2005 | 2.506 million | 6 | Seven Network | |
| 2006 | 2.272 million | 12 | Seven Network | |
| 2007 | 2.191 million | 8 | Seven Network | |
| 2008 | 2.272 million | 4 | Seven Network | |
| 2009 | 2.673 million | 4 | Seven Network | |
| 2010 | 2.707 million | 5 | Seven Network | |
| 2011 | 2.667 million | 6 | Seven Network | |
| 2012 | 2.767 million | 8 | Seven Network | |
| 2013 | 2.310 million | 10 | Seven Network | |
| 2014 | 2.178 million | 15 | Seven Network | |
| 2015 | 2.130 million | 10 | Seven Network | |
| 2016 | 2.066 million | 10 | Seven Network | |
| 2017 | 1.824 million | 15 | Seven Network | |
| 2018 | 1.908 million | 9 | Seven Network | |
| 2019 | 1.441 million | 15 | Network 10 | |
| 2020 | 1.412 million | 14 | Network 10 | |
| 2021 | 1.213 million | 44 | Network 10 | |
| 2022 | 1.024 million | —N/a | Network 10 | |
| 2023 | 1.110 million | —N/a | Network 10 | |

Australian total television viewers
| Year | Viewers | Rank | Network | Ref. |
|---|---|---|---|---|
| 2024 | 1.910 million | 13 | Nine Network | |
| 2025 | 2.079 million | TBA | Nine Network | |
| 2026 | 2.216 million | TBA | Nine Network | |

== Controversies ==
=== Animal welfare ===
The Melbourne Cup has drawn increasing criticism regarding the welfare of participating horses. Since 2013, six horses have been confirmed to have died during the Cup, or on Cup Day, with many more permanently injured either in the race or en route. Nationally, the Coalition for the Protection of Racehorses reported at least 174 thoroughbreds died from racing or training injuries in Australia over a 12-month period, marking the highest number on record. In several instances, horses have fractured limbs while being pushed to finish the race, or collapsed in stalls after competing. Visible injuries also raise alarm. The 2025 winner was photographed with blood around the mouth post-race.

=== Domestic violence rates ===
The Melbourne Cup also plays a role in broader social issues. Research shows that domestic violence incidents spike on Cup Day in Victoria and around other large sporting events. An academic analysis found that not only alcohol but gambling losses, heightened emotions and cultural norms around masculinity contribute to the surges in family violence.

=== Gambling culture ===
The Cup acts as a major driver of betting behaviour in Australia, normalising wagering among people who may not otherwise regularly gamble. Research by the Centre for Gambling Research at ANU indicates that although betting on racehorses has slightly declined overall, Cup Day remains a "huge spike" in wagering and is effectively used by bookmakers to convert new or casual bettors into repeat users. A poll of Australian adults found that while just 19% regularly bet on horse races, 38% said they would watch the Melbourne Cup and place a bet, highlighting how the event sends social cues that wagering is expected. One study noted annual betting of over A$105 million on the single race in earlier years.

=== Littering and waste issues ===
Large volumes of litter accumulate across the surrounding areas during Carnival week, leading to criticism of the single-use culture. Cleaning crews estimate that the post-event clean-up often exceeds 150 tonnes of rubbish just for the main Cup day at Flemington Racecourse. Additionally, protests have targeted the event's social licence: in one 2022 incident, activists dumped oily sludge on the track to highlight perceived cruelty and environmental impact. Much of the waste consists of single-use drink bottles, beer cans, glassware, food packaging, and other disposable items left by attendees. For example, one report highlighted the discovery of "underwear, hats, false teeth" among the litter.

== Cultural significance and popular culture ==
=== The Race that Stops a Nation ===
The Melbourne Cup is commonly billed as The race that stops a nation. In the Melbourne metropolitan area, the race day has been a gazetted public holiday since 1877, but around both Australia and New Zealand a majority of people watch the race on television and gamble, either through direct betting or participating in workplace cup "sweeps". In 2000, a betting agency claimed that 80 percent of the adult Australian population placed a bet on the race that year. In 2010 it was predicted that $183 million would be spent by 83,000 tourists during the Spring Racing Carnival. In New Zealand, the Melbourne Cup is the country's single biggest betting event, with carnival race days held at several of the country's top tracks showing the cup live on big screens.

- "The Race That Stops The Nation" is a poem about Australia's fascination with the Melbourne Cup. Sydney born writer Vivienne McCredie wrote it in 1986. It was read out on an evening poetry radio program run by Kel Richards at the time and later published (2005 ISBN 978-0-9758311-0-6). Copies are in the State Library of NSW and the National Library of Australia.

=== Public holiday ===
Melbourne Cup day is a public holiday for all working within metropolitan Melbourne and some parts of regional Victoria, but not for some country Victorian cities and towns which hold their own spring carnivals. For federal public servants it is also observed as a holiday in the entire state of Victoria, and from 2007 to 2009 also in the Australian Capital Territory known as Family and Community Day, replacing Picnic Day.

As early as 1865, Cup Day was a half-holiday in Melbourne for public servants and bank officials. Various businesses also closed at lunchtime.

It took some years before the purpose of the declared holiday was acknowledged in the Victoria Government Gazette. The Gazette of 31 October 1873 announced that the following Thursday (Cup Day) be observed as a bank and civil (public) service holiday.

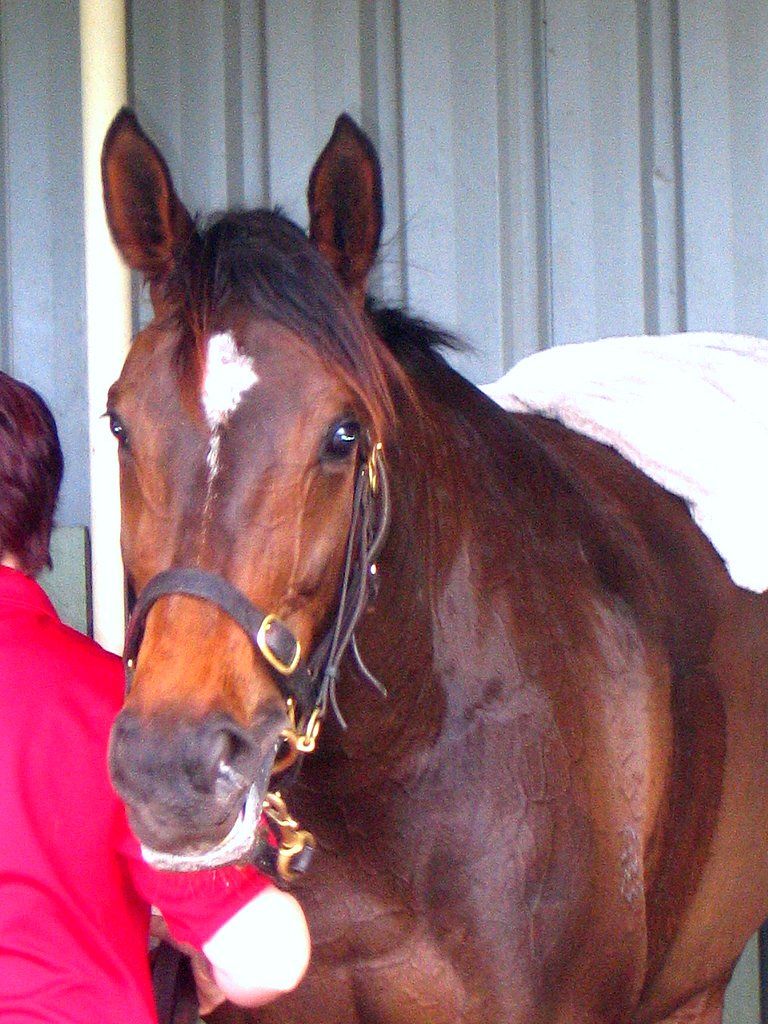
Horse Makybe Diva won three Melbourne Cups

=== Spring "Fashions on the Field" ===
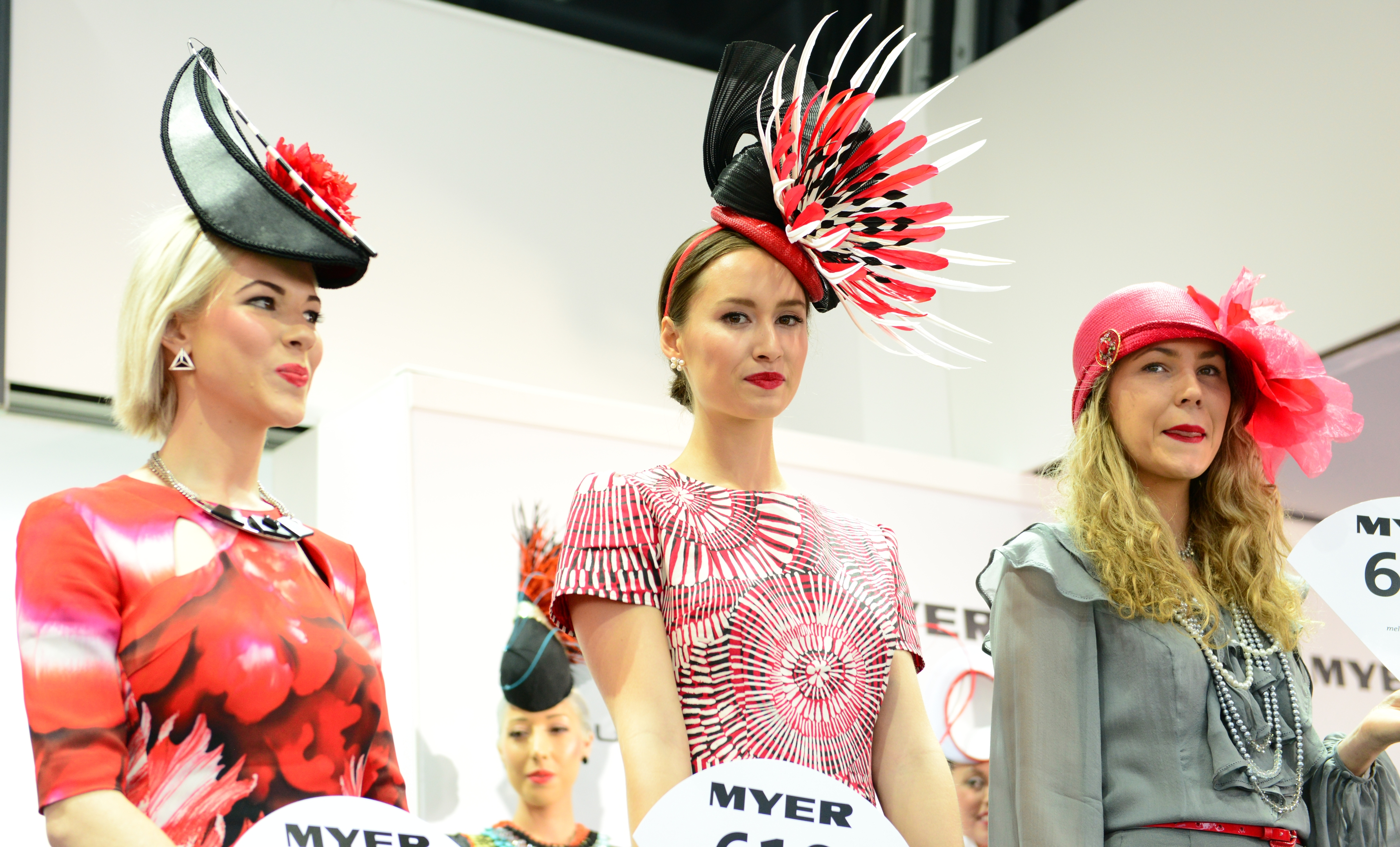
Finalists in Fashions on the Field at the 2013 race

1965 ABC news report on Jean Shrimpton's visit to the Melbourne Cup

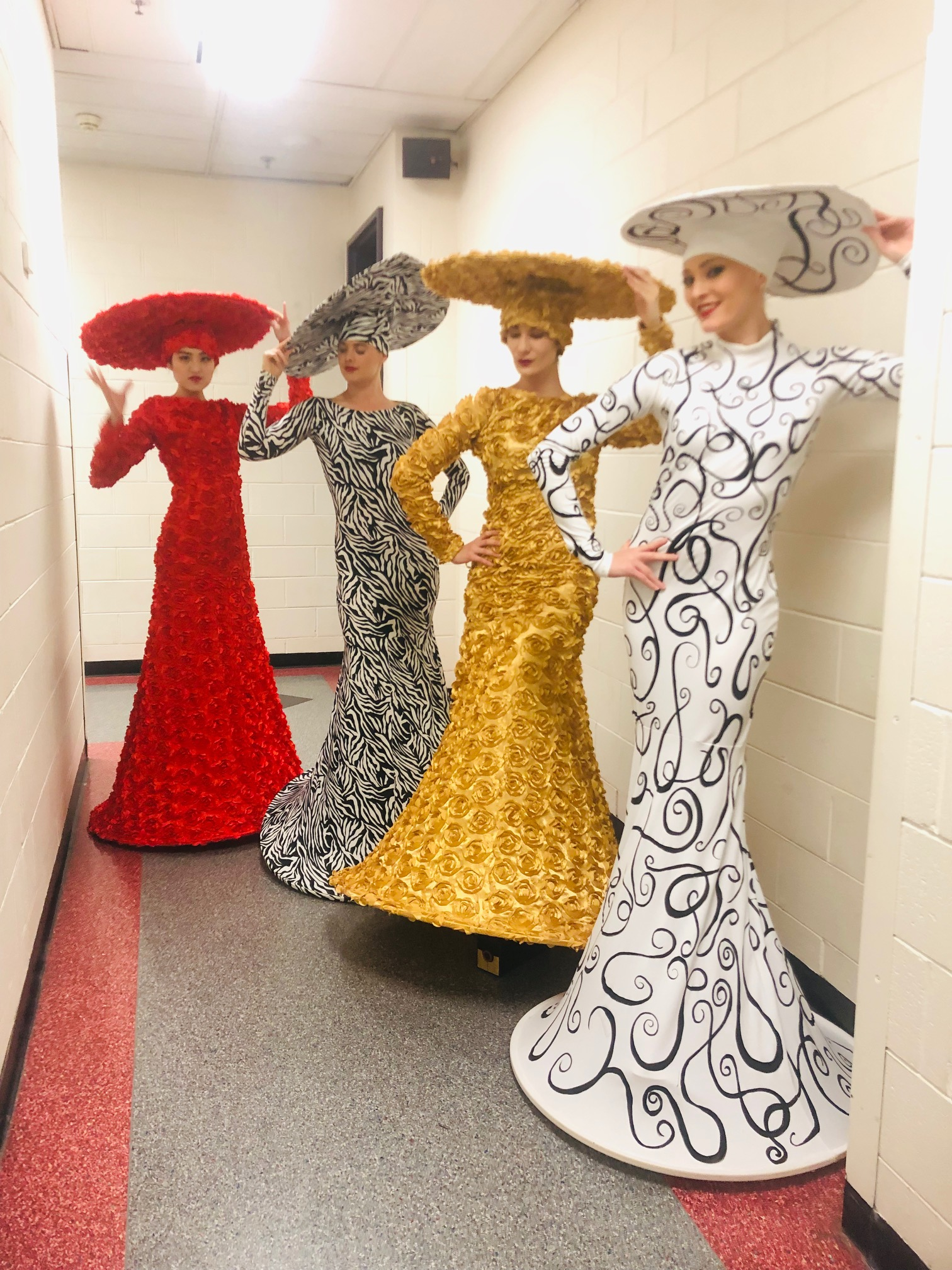
Race attendees, 2019

'Fashions on the Field' is a major focus of the day, with substantial prizes awarded for the best-dressed man and woman. The requirement for elegant hats, and more recently the alternative of a fascinator, almost single-handedly keeps Melbourne's milliners in business. Raceday fashion has occasionally drawn almost as much attention as the race itself. The miniskirt received worldwide publicity when model Jean Shrimpton wore a white shift version of one on Derby Day during Melbourne Cup week in 1965.

Flowers, especially roses, are an important component of the week's racing at Flemington. The racecourse has around 12,000 roses within its large expanse. Over 200 varieties of the fragrant flower are nurtured by a team of up to 12 gardeners. Each of the major racedays at Flemington has an official flower. Victoria Derby Day has the Corn Flower, Melbourne Cup Day is for the Yellow Rose, Oaks Day highlights the Pink Rose, and Stakes Day goes to the Red Rose.

=== Literature ===
A Melbourne Cup betting coup is featured in the 1882 novel Robbery Under Arms by Rolf Boldrewood.

=== Film ===
The 1930 and 1931 Melbourne Cups are depicted in the movie Phar Lap (1983), and a fictitious Melbourne Cup with what appears to be real newsreel footage is featured in Charlie Chan at the Race Track (1936). The Cup is a 2011 feature film about the dramatic events surrounding the 2002 Melbourne Cup. Ride Like a Girl is a 2019 feature film about the life of Michelle Payne and her victorious ride in the 2015 Melbourne Cup.

=== "Nup to the Cup" ===
As Australia's highest-profile horse race, the Melbourne Cup has become a focus of growing criticism since the 2000s, relating to the treatment of racehorses on and off the field as well as concerns about the public holiday's normalisation of gambling and excess alcohol consumption. Since 2008, the Coalition for the Protection of Racehorses has run alternative events under the slogan "Nup to the Cup" and conducted research and public awareness campaigns on racehorse injuries and deaths. In 2019, an Australian Broadcasting Corporation (ABC) investigation revealed that hundreds of racehorses a year were being sent to slaughterhouses where they were subjected to inhumane treatment before being killed, contradicting statistics published by Racing Australia. Changing attitudes towards horse racing have been observed in public opinion polls and lower attendance rates since the ABC's investigation. High-profile celebrities, including Taylor Swift and Megan Gale, cancelled their attendance at the 2019 Cup following the ABC report, and entertainers and influencers continue to face pressure from some of their fans to boycott the Cup.

== See also ==
- List of Melbourne Cup placings
- List of Melbourne Cup winners
- Melbourne Cup Challenge / Frankie Dettori Racing video game
- Melbourne Spring Racing Carnival
- Thoroughbred racing in Australia
