= 1865 Melbourne Cup =

Edition of the Melbourne Cup

- Melbourne Cup
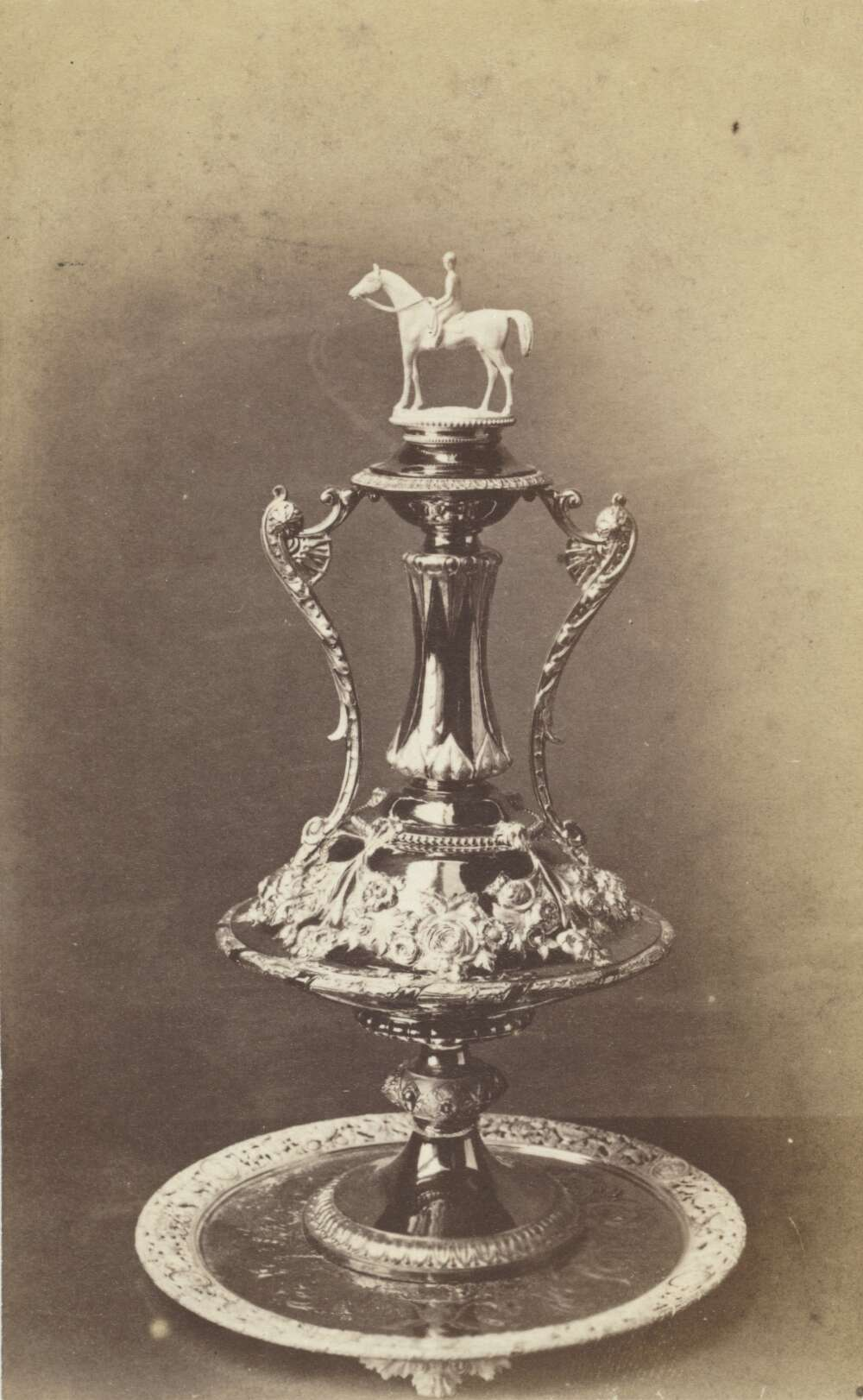
- The 1865 Melbourne Cup trophy
- Location: Flemington Racecourse
- Date: 2 November 1865
- Distance: 2 miles
- Winning horse: Toryboy
- Winning time: 3:44.0
- Final odds: 25/1
- Jockey: John Kavanagh
- Trainer: Pat Miley
- Owner: B.C. Marshall
- Conditions: Hard
- Surface: Turf
- Attendance: 13,000

The 1865 Melbourne Cup was a two-mile handicap horse race which took place on Thursday, 2 November 1865.

This year was the fifth running of the Melbourne Cup. The Victoria Racing Club awarded a trophy for the first time in the history of the race. The race was won by an eight-year-old Gray named Toryboy becoming both the first gray and the oldest horse to win the race. The runner up, Panic actually protested the race which was quickly dismissed.

This was the first year a trophy was awarded to the winning owner. Toryboy's owner Mr B.C. Marshall, reportedly sold the trophy, which he considered a monstrosity. The trophy was designed and made by London company Smith and Nicholson.

Following declarations, 26 horses were in the running for the race, with three horses scratched on race day leaving 23 horses to start the race.

Foaled in England and imported to Tasmania, Panic had been purchased by Thomas Dowling to win the Melbourne Cup. Giving away much weight to much of the field, Panic led from the front for much of the race, only headed briefly by Frolic, Minstrel, and eventually by Toryboy. The field was widely spread and reports suggest that a number of horses failed to finish. Toryboy making advantage of the lighter weight won by two lengths from Panic, with Riverina third a further three lengths behind.

Toryboy had previously finished fifth in the 1861 race, and sixth in 1862.

In 2021, Victorian Racing Club historian Andrew Lemon, confirmed that 12-year-old John Kavanagh was the winning jockey riding Toryboy. Kavanagh was presented with a silver mounted whip.

== Full results ==
This is the list of placegetters for the 1865 Melbourne Cup.

Place	Horse	Age Gender	Jockey	Weight	Trainer	Owner	Odds	Margin
1	Toryboy	8y g	John Kavanagh	7 st 0 lb (44.5 kg)	Pat Miley	Mr B.C. Marshall	25/1	2 lengths
2	Panic (GBR)	7y h	Joe Morrison	10 st 0 lb (63.5 kg)		Philip Dowling	5/1 eq. fav.	3 lengths
3	Riverina	5y m	William Yeomans	7 st 7 lb (47.6 kg)		William Hutton	16/1	
4	Angler	3y c	J. Davis	6 st 5 lb (40.4 kg)		Hurtle Fisher	7/1	
5	Frolic	3y c	Andrew Mitchelson	6 st 12 lb (43.5 kg)		Philip Dowling	12/1	
6	Cadland	4y g	Harry Chifney (Note: Jockey Henry Dawes rode under the name Harry Chifney.)	7 st 10 lb (49.0 kg)		William Field	50/1	
7	Musidora	6y m	Denis Fountain	9 st 0 lb (57.2 kg)	James Wilson	James Wilson	12/1	
8	Julie-cum-Sneezer	Aged g	J. Bishop	8 st 7 lb (54.0 kg)		Mr F. Hobson	33/1	
9	Rose of Denmark	5y m	Goodman	8 st 5 lb (53.1 kg)	Hurtle Fisher	Hurtle Fisher	5/1 eq. fav.	
—N/a	Poet	5y h	J. Ashworth	9 st 6 lb (59.9 kg)		Isaac Pear	8/1	
—N/a	Oriflamme	5y h	W. Lang	9 st 0 lb (57.2 kg)		David Kennedy	20/1	
—N/a	Playboy	Aged g	J. Carter	8 st 11 lb (55.8 kg)		Patrick Keighran	12/1	
—N/a	Minstrel	5y g	Sam Waldock	8 st 9 lb (54.9 kg)		Mr W.A. Wetton	10/1	
—N/a	Songster	4y g	Charles Stanley	8 st 7 lb (54.0 kg)		Isaac Pear	100/1	
—N/a	Viscount	Aged g	R. Clarke	8 st 6 lb (53.5 kg)		William Pearson	33/1	
—N/a	Ellen	Aged m	Winter	8 st 7 lb (54.0 kg)		William Field	33/1	
—N/a	Victoria (GBR)	4y m	H. Cooke	8 st 0 lb (50.8 kg)		William Cross Yuille	12/1	
—N/a	Shadow	Aged m	T. Handley	7 st 7 lb (47.6 kg)		William Warren	100/1	
—N/a	The Miller	3y c	McDonald	6 st 0 lb (38.1 kg)		Mr N.J. Uren	20/1	
—N/a	Nightshade	3y f	J. Hoysted	6 st 0 lb (38.1 kg)		Mr H.G. Bowler	100/1	
—N/a	Mahratta	4y h	P. Gill	7 st 13 lb (50.3 kg)		John Field	50/1	
—N/a	Mozart	Aged g	A. Hill	7 st 9 lb (48.5 kg)		Mr J. Armstrong	12/1	
—N/a	Alexandra	3y f	Samuel Davis	5 st 12 lb (37.2 kg)		Mr W. Faris	16/1	
SCR	Maidstone	3y f	—N/a	6 st 0 lb (38.1 kg)	—N/a	Mr R.C. Wood	—N/a	
SCR	Charles Albert	3y c	—N/a	6 st 0 lb (38.1 kg)	—N/a	William Cross Yuille	—N/a	
SCR	Lancer	4y g	—N/a	8 st 6 lb (53.5 kg)	—N/a	Philip Dowling	—N/a	
SCR	Ebor	—N/a	—N/a	—N/a	—N/a	—N/a	—N/a	
SCR	Shenandoah	—N/a	—N/a	—N/a	—N/a	—N/a	—N/a	

== Prizemoney ==
First prize £1,015, second prize £20.

The owner of the winner also received a trophy for the first time. Manufactured in England, it was "an elaborate silver bowl on a stand with a narrow neck reinforced with two ornate handles and topped with a horse and rider."

== See also ==
- Melbourne Cup
- List of Melbourne Cup winners
- Victoria Racing Club
