= John Cutts (jockey) =

Australian jockey

- Born: John Dillon c. 1829; Sydney, New South Wales, Australia
- Died: 6 September 1872 (age 43); Randwick, New South Wales, Australia
- Other names: John 'Cutts' Dillon, Johnny Dillon, Johnny Cutts
- Occupation: Jockey
- Known for: Winning the first Melbourne Cup; Winning the Melbourne Cup in 2 consecutive years (1861 and 1862) with Archer
- Parent(s): Thomas Dillon; Ann Butler

John Dillon (c. 1829 – 6 September 1872) was an Australian jockey who at the age of 32 rode Archer, the winner of the first Melbourne Cup in 1861. The next day John rode Archer to win another long distance race, the Melbourne Town Plate. In May 1862 he rode Archer to win the Queen Elizabeth Stakes (ATC), and returned to Melbourne later that year to win his second Melbourne Cup. Due to a technical error which stopped Archer from being entered in the third (1863) Melbourne Cup, Cutts was not able to attempt to win the hat-trick.

== Background ==
During his long career John 'Cutts' Dillon, was one of the best known, best liked and most respected jockeys in New South Wales. Keith W. Paterson in his book The Masters Touch, Racing with trainer Etienne L. de Mestre, Winner of 5 Melbourne Cups tells us that he was "respected for his honesty, no less than for his skill as a horseman...gained the esteem of not only his fellow professionals but also of all owners of horses for whom he rode".

== Early life and personal life ==
Johnny learnt his craft as a jockey at the stable of William Cutts, "the crack Homebush trainer". In 1859 Johnny married the widow of William Cutts, Mary Cutts (née Bradbury) (1839–1903) at Goulburn, the daughter of Walter & Mary Bradbury. Mary had been born on Norfolk Island in 1839, and at only 12 years old had married her first husband William Cutts in 1851 at Sydney. Johnny and Mary moved to Hartley where daughter Emma Dillon (1859–1887) was born that year, followed the next year by son Clement Dillon (1860–1900), two years later by John Thomas Dillon (1862–1915) back in Goulburn, and followed by the two youngest boys at Randwick in Sydney in 1864 and 1868: Walter Edward Dillon (1864–1928), and William Charles Dillon (1868–?).

== Career ==
Archer, the horse John rode to victory in the first and second Melbourne Cups in 1861 and 1862, was from the stable of Etienne de Mestre at "Terara" near Nowra in New South Wales. Mary's brother Walter Bradbury (1835–1936), had also had been employed by Etienne, and had also been associated with Archer's training. In 1935 he told the Sydney Morning Herald "I remember the day when I saw Johnny Cutts off to his first Melbourne Cup."

John Cutts rode Archer in 16 of his 17 starts, winning 11 of these 16 races. The only race of Archer's where John did not ride him was once when Archer was ridden by Etienne de Mestre himself. Cutts last race for the de Mestre stable, and his last ride before retiring as a jockey, was on Archer who placed third in the three-mile Seventh Champion Sweepstakes at Ballarat on 1 October 1863. In total Cutts rode 56 times for de Mestre, beginning on 1 January 1858 at Homebush when he won the Consolation Stakes on Greenmantle. From 1858 to 1863, whilst his growing family was living at Hartley and Goulburn, he was the principal jockey for de Mestre's Nowra stable. Other horses ridden by Cutts for de Mestre included Veno, Mariner, Greenmantle, Sailor, Moss Rose, Exeter, Inheritor, Lauristina, Potentate, and Red Rover.

== Heritage ==
A legend that has sprung up around the horse Archer is that his jockey, John Cutts, was an Aboriginal. Cutts was, according to the legend, born in the area around Nowra, and one of the many Aboriginal males who replaced the bulk of the white stockmen who walked off the land to join the goldrush. Although it would be romantic to believe that an Aboriginal jockey had won the first and second Melbourne Cups, the most famous horse race in Australia, the cold hard facts of history do not allow this notion. The spot in racing history for the first (and only) Aboriginal jockey to win the Melbourne Cup belongs to Frank Reys on Gala Supreme in 1973.

Instead of having any Aboriginal blood, Cutts was born of English stock. He had been born John Dillon in Sydney in about 1829, the son of Thomas Dillon, a clerk, and his wife Ann Butler. A family photo of him and his wife Mary has survived, published in Keith W. Paterson's book, that confirms that John does not have Aboriginal heritage.

Johnny is also remembered for winning the Queen's Plate at Flemington Racecourse in 1851 and 1852 on Cossack. John was then at the height of his fame, and won many other races for Cossack's trainer John Tait before he ever rode a horse for Etienne de Mestre.

== Later life ==
After retiring from racing at the end of 1863 John continued to enjoy close contacts with the racing fraternity through the Half Way Hotel that he and his wife managed on Sydney Road, near Randwick Racecourse.

John 'Cutts' Dillon died, after an illness of more than 12 months, on 6 September 1872 at the age of 43. Coincidentally the horse with whom he will always be linked, Archer, died a few months later the same year in December 1872.

Johnny's family laid him to rest in Rookwood Cemetery. His long illness had dwindled his savings leaving his widow and children destitute. A subscription was raised for the benefit of his family, and £130 was collected in just the first few days.

== Archer's races ==
Age	Date	Track	Race	Distance	Jockey	Place
3yo	29.05.1860	Randwick	Tattersall’s Free Handicap	1 ¾ miles	John Cutts	Unplaced
	31.05.1860	Randwick	Randwick Plate	1 ½ miles	John Cutts	Unplaced
4yo	06.09.1860	Randwick	Metropolitan Maiden Plate	1 ¾ miles	John Cutts	1st
	08.09.1860	Randwick	Randwick Plate	1 ½ miles	John Cutts	1st
	25.09.1860	Windsor	Hawkesbury Maiden Plate	1 ¾ miles	John Cutts	1st
	27.09.1860	Windsor	The Stewards Purse	1 ¼ miles	John Cutts	1st
	02.05.1861	Randwick	Australian Plate	2 ½ miles	John Cutts	1st
	04.05.1861	Randwick	Randwick Plate	1 ½ miles	John Cutts	1st
	04.06.1861	Maitland	Maitland Town Plate		Etienne de Mestre	1st
5yo	07.11.1861	Flemington	Melbourne Cup	2 miles	John Cutts	1st
	08.11.1861	Flemington	Melbourne Town Plate	2 miles	John Cutts	1st
	26.04.1862	Randwick	Randwick Grand Handicap	2 ½ miles	John Cutts	3rd
	03.05.1862	Randwick	AJC Queen’s Plate	3 miles	John Cutts	1st
6yo	01.10.1862	Geelong	Fifth Champion Sweepstakes	3 miles	John Cutts	3rd
	13.11.1862	Flemington	Melbourne Cup	2 miles	John Cutts	1st
	15.11.1862	Flemington	All-Aged Stakes	1 mile	John Cutts	1st
7yo	01.10.1863	Ballarat	Seventh Champion Sweepstakes	3 miles	John Cutts	3rd
