= Toryboy =

Australian Thoroughbred racehorse

- Sire: Wollaton (GB)
- Grandsire: The Caster (GB)
- Dam: Fair Ellen (AUS)
- Damsire: Rory O’More (IRE)
- Sex: Gelding
- Foaled: 1857
- Country: Australia
- Colour: Grey
- Owner: B.C. Marshall
- Trainer: Pat Miley

Major wins
- Melbourne Cup (1865)
- Last updated on 23 October 2018

Toryboy was an Australian bred Thoroughbred racehorse that won the 1865 Melbourne Cup.

Toryboy was an eight-year-old grey gelding when winning the Cup. Overall, he ran in five Melbourne Cups, finishing fifth in 1861, sixth in 1862 and running unplaced in 1866 and 1867. He was not a physically imposing specimen, being described as "a racehorse in miniature" and as "a little old grey pony" at the time he won the Cup.

The 1865 Cup was run in fine weather and attracted a large crowd including the Governor of Victoria (Charles Henry Darling) and visitors from South Australia, New South Wales and Tasmania. The race was run at a very fast pace and most of the runners were struggling with half a mile left to run. The closing stages saw a sustained struggle between Toryboy (carrying 7 stones) and the top weight Panic (10 stones), with the former prevailing by two lengths. After the race a protest was lodged by the connections of the runner up for "crossing" but the result remained unaltered.

The 1865 Melbourne Cup was the first year a trophy was awarded to the winning owner. Toryboy's then owner B Marshall, reportedly sold the trophy, which he considered a monstrosity.

Toryboy ran unplaced in the next two Melbourne Cups. In 1872 the horse was reportedly sold at auction for only £6.
