= List of Melbourne Cup winners =

Winners of the Melbourne Cup

This is a list of the winners of the Melbourne Cup. The Melbourne Cup is Australia's major thoroughbred horse race, which is run at Flemington Racecourse in Melbourne. Each year, internationally bred or owned horses compete in the race. Since 1882, New Zealand–bred horses have won 44 Melbourne Cups, British-bred horses have won seven, Irish-bred horses have won six, American-bred horses have won five, German-bred and French-bred horses have won two each, and Japanese-bred horses have won one.

== Winners ==
Note: Horses and jockeys are Australian unless mentioned

| Year | Winner | Age Gender | Jockey | Trainer | Owner | Time | Field | Ref. |
|---|---|---|---|---|---|---|---|---|
| 1861 | Archer | 5 h | John Cutts | Etienne de Mestre | Etienne de Mestre | 3:52.00 | 17 | |
| 1862 | Archer | 6 h | John Cutts | Etienne de Mestre | Etienne de Mestre | 3:47.00 | 20 | |
| 1863 | Banker | 3 c | Harry Chifney (Note: Jockey Henry Dawes rode under the name Harry Chifney.) | Sam Waldock | Joseph Harper | 3:44.00 | 7 | |
| 1864 | Lantern | 3 c | Sam Davis | William Filgate | Hurtle Fisher | 3:52.00 | 19 | |
| 1865 | Toryboy | 8 g | John Kavanagh | Pat Miley | B. Marshall | 3:44.00 | 23 | |
| 1866 | The Barb | 3 c | William Davis | John Tait | John Tait | 3:43.00 | 28 | |
| 1867 | Tim Whiffler | 5 h | John Driscoll | Etienne de Mestre | Etienne de Mestre | 3:39.00 | 27 | |
| 1868 | Glencoe | 4 h | Charles Stanley | John Tait | John Tait | 3:42.00 | 25 | |
| 1869 | Warrior | 6 g | Joe Morrison | Robert Sevior | Austin Saqui | 3:40.00 | 26 | |
| 1870 | Nimblefoot | 7 g | John Day | William Lang | Walter Craig | 3:37.00 | 28 | |
| 1871 | The Pearl | 5 h | John Kavanagh | John Tait | John Tait | 3:39.00 | 23 | |
| 1872 | The Quack | 6 h | William Enderson | John Tait | John Tait | 3:39.00 | 22 | |
| 1873 | Don Juan | 4 h | William Wilson | James Wilson | W. Johnstone (Note: Alias of Melbourne bookmaker Joe Thomson) | 3:36.00 | 24 | |
| 1874 | Haricot | 4 g | Paddy Pigott | Sam Harding | Andrew Chirnside | 3:37.50 | 18 | |
| 1875 | Wollomai | 6 h | Robert Batty | Stephen Moon | John Cleeland | 3:38.00 | 20 | |
| 1876 | Briseis | 3 f | Peter St Albans | James Wilson | James Wilson | 3:36.25 | 33 | |
| 1877 | Chester | 3 c | Paddy Pigott | Etienne de Mestre | James White | 3:33.50 | 33 | |
| 1878 | Calamia | 5 h | Thomas Brown | Etienne de Mestre | Etienne de Mestre | 3:35.75 | 30 | |
| 1879 | Darriwell | 5 h | Sam Cracknell | William E. Dakin | William Guesdon | 3:30.75 | 27 | |
| 1880 | Grand Flaneur | 3 c | Thomas Hales | Thomas Brown | William A. Long | 3:34.75 | 22 | |
| 1881 | Zulu | 4 h | Jim Gough | Tom Lamond | Charles McDonnell | 3:32.50 | 33 | |
| 1882 | The Assyrian | 5 h | Charles Hutchins | John Eden Savill | John Eden Savill | 3:40.00 | 25 | |
| 1883 | Martini-Henry (NZL) | 3 c | John Williamson (Note: Also known as Jack Williamson) | Michael Fennelly | James White | 3:30.50 | 29 | |
| 1884 | Malua | 5 h | Alec Robertson | Isaac Foulsham | John Ord Inglis | 3:31.75 | 24 | |
| 1885 | Sheet Anchor | 7 h | Mick O'Brien | Tommy Wilson | Martin Loughlin | 3:29.50 | 35 | |
| 1886 | Arsenal | 4 h | William English | Harry Rayner | William Gannon | 3:31.00 | 28 | |
| 1887 | Dunlop | 5 h | Tom Sanders | John Nicholson | Richard Donovan | 3:28.50 | 18 | |
| 1888 | Mentor | 4 h | Mick O'Brien | Walter Hickenbotham | Donald Smith Wallace | 3:30.75 | 28 | |
| 1889 | Bravo | 6 h | Jack Anwin | Tommy Wilson | William Thomas Jones | 3:32.50 | 20 | |
| 1890 | Carbine (NZL) | 5 h | Robert Ramage | Walter Hickenbotham | Donald Smith Wallace | 3:28.25 | 39 | |
| 1891 | Malvolio | 4 h | George Redfearn | James Redfearn | James Redfearn | 3:29.25 | 34 | |
| 1892 | Glenloth | 5 h | George Robson | Michael Carmody | Michael Carmody | 3:36.25 | 35 | |
| 1893 | Tarcoola | 7 h | Herbert Cripps | Joseph Cripps | J. D. Lewis | 3:30.50 | 30 | |
| 1894 | Patron | 4 h | Horace G. Dawes | Richard Bradfield | F. W. Purches | 3:31.00 | 28 | |
| 1895 | Auraria | 3 f | John Stevenson | John Hill | David James | 3:29.00 | 36 | |
| 1896 | Newhaven | 3 c | Harry Gardiner | Walter Hickenbotham | W. T. Jones & S. Cooper | 3:28.50 | 25 | |
| 1897 | Gaulus | 6 h | Stephen Callinan | William "Black Bill" Forrester | William "Black Bill" Forrester | 3:31.00 | 29 | |
| 1898 | The Grafter | 5 g | John Gough | William "Black Bill" Forrester | William "Black Bill" Forrester | 3:29.75 | 28 | |
| 1899 | Merriwee | 3 c | Vivian Turner | James Wilson Jr. | Herbert Power | 3:36.50 | 28 | |
| 1900 | Clean Sweep | 3 c | Andrew Richardson | James Scobie | Frank Cumming ("Mr. F. T. Forrest") | 3:29.00 | 29 | |
| 1901 | Revenue | 5 g | Frederick J. Dunn | Hugh Munro | C. Leslie Macdonald | 3:30.50 | 19 | |
| 1902 | The Victory | 4 h | Bobbie Lewis | Richard Bradfield | Clark & Robinson | 3:29.00 | 22 | |
| 1903 | Lord Cardigan | 3 c | Norman Godby | Albert E. Cornwell | John Mayo | 3:29.25 | 24 | |
| 1904 | Acrasia | 7 m | Tom Clayton | Albert E. Wills | Humphrey Oxenham | 3:28.25 | 34 | |
| 1905 | Blue Spec | 6 h | Frank Bullock | Walter Hickenbotham | P. A. (Paddy) Connolly | 3:27.50 | 27 | |
| 1906 | Poseidon | 3 c | Tom Clayton | Isaac Earnshaw | Sir Hugh Denison | 3:31.25 | 21 | |
| 1907 | Apologue (NZL) | 5 h | Bill Evans | Isaac Earnshaw | R. L. Cleland | 3:27.50 | 19 | |
| 1908 | Lord Nolan | 3 c | John R. Flynn | Earnest A. Mayo | John Mayo | 3:28.75 | 22 | |
| 1909 | Prince Foote | 3 c | William H. McLachlan | Frank McGrath | John Brown | 3:27.50 | 26 | |
| 1910 | Comedy King (GBR) | 4 h | William H. McLachlan | James Lynch | Sol Green | 3:27.75 | 30 | |
| 1911 | The Parisian | 6 g | Ronald Cameron | Charlie Wheeler | John Kirby | 3:27.75 | 33 | |
| 1912 | Piastre | 4 h | Albert Shanahan | Richard O'Connor | William Brown | 3:27.50 | 23 | |
| 1913 | Posinatus | 5 g | Albert Shanahan | James Chambers | James Chambers | 3:31.00 | 20 | |
| 1914 | Kingsburgh | 4 h | George Meddick | Isaac Foulsham | Lauchlan Kenneth Scobie ("L.K.S.") MacKinnon | 3:26.00 | 28 | |
| 1915 | Patrobas | 3 c | Bobbie Lewis | Charlie Wheeler | Edith Widdis | 3:28.25 | 24 | |
| 1916 | Sasanof (NZL) | 3 g | Fred Foley | Murray Hobbs | Wilfred G. Stead/E.S. Luttrell | 3:27.75 | 28 | |
| 1917 | Westcourt | 5 h | William H. McLachlan | Joseph Burton | Daniel U. Seaton | 3:26.75 | 20 | |
| 1918 | Night Watch | 5 g | Bill Duncan | Richard Bradfield | C. L. Macdonald | 3:25.75 | 27 | |
| 1919 | Artilleryman | 3 c | Bobbie Lewis | Phillip T. Heywood | Samuel Hordern/Alexander Dyce Murphy | 3:24.50 | 20 | |
| 1920 | Poitrel | 6 h | Ken Bracken | Harry J. Robinson | Bill & Frederik Albert Moses | 3:25.75 | 23 | |
| 1921 | Sister Olive | 3 f | Ted O'Sullivan (Note: Also known as Edward Kenny) | Jack Williams | F. W. Norman | 3:27.75 | 25 | |
| 1922 | King Ingoda | 4 h | Alan "Tich" Wilson | James Scobie | Charles Dubois/R.W. Bennett | 3:28.25 | 32 | |
| 1923 | Bitalli | 5 g | Alan "Tich" Wilson | James Scobie | Alfred Thomas Craig | 3:24.25 | 26 | |
| 1924 | Backwood (IRE) | 6 h | Bunty Brown | Richard Bradfield | William Clark & E. L. "Prince" Baillieu | 3:26.50 | 18 | |
| 1925 | Windbag | 4 h | James L. Munro | George R. Price | Robert Miller | 3:22.75 | 28 | |
| 1926 | Spearfelt | 5 h | Hugh Harold Cairns | V. O'Neill | D. C. Grant | 3:22.75 | 21 | |
| 1927 | Trivalve | 3 c | Bobbie Lewis | James Scobie | E. E. D. Clarke | 3:24.00 | 26 | |
| 1928 | Statesman | 4 h | James L. Munro | William Kelso | William Kelso | 3:23.25 | 17 | |
| 1929 | Nightmarch (NZL) | 4 h | Roy Reed | Alec McAulay | A. Louisson | 3:26.50 | 14 | |
| 1930 | Phar Lap (NZL) | 4 g | James E. Pike | Harry Telford | Harry R. Telford and David J. Davis | 3:27.75 | 15 | |
| 1931 | White Nose | 5 h | Neville Percival | E. J. Hatwell | H. P. McLachlan | 3:26.00 | 14 | |
| 1932 | Peter Pan | 3 c | Bill Duncan | Frank McGrath | Rodney R. Dangar | 3:23.25 | 27 | |
| 1933 | Hall Mark | 3 c | Jack O'Sullivan | Jack Holt | C. B. Kellow | 3:27.50 | 18 | |
| 1934 | Peter Pan | 5 h | Darby Munro | Frank McGrath | Rodney R. Dangar | 3:40.50 | 22 | |
| 1935 | Marabou | 4 h | Keith Voitre | Lou Robertson | J. Fell & T. Hogan | 3:23.75 | 22 | |
| 1936 | Wotan (NZL) | 4 h | Ossie Phillips | Jack Fryer | T. A., W. & R. Smith | 3:21.25 | 20 | |
| 1937 | The Trump | 5 g | Ashley Reed | Stanley Reid | Darcy Eccles | 3:21.50 | 28 | |
| 1938 | Catalogue (NZL) | 8 g | Fred Shean | Allan McDonald (Note: McDonald's wife, Hedwick Wilhelmina "Granny" McDonald, was actually the trainer of this horse as it was believed that women could not be registered as trainers. It was her husband who was the registered trainer.) | Mrs. A. Jamieson | 3:26.25 | 22 | |
| 1939 | Rivette | 6 m | Teddy Preston | Harry Bamber | Harry Bamber | 3:27.00 | 26 | |
| 1940 | Old Rowley | 7 g | Andy Knox | Jack Scully | Jack Scully | 3:26.00 | 20 | |
| 1941 | Skipton | 3 c | Billy Cook | Jack Fryer | Myrtle Kitson | 3:23.75 | 23 | |
| 1942 | Colonus | 4 h | Harry McCloud | Frank Manning | Leo Menck | 3:33.25 | 24 | |
| 1943 | Dark Felt | 6 h | Vic Hartney | Ray Webster | J. A. Cain | 3:23.25 | 24 | |
| 1944 | Sirius | 4 h | Darby Munro | E. Fisher | R.Turnbull | 3:24.50 | 23 | |
| 1945 | Rainbird | 4 m | Billy Cook | Sam Evans | Clifford A. Reid | 3:24.25 | 26 | |
| 1946 | Russia | 6 h | Darby Munro | E. Hush | J. G. Leeds & E. Hush | 3:21.25 | 35 | |
| 1947 | Hiraji (NZL) | 4 g | Jack Purtell | Jim McCurley | Fred W. Hughes | 3:28.00 | 30 | |
| 1948 | Rimfire | 6 g | Ray Neville | Stan Boyden | H. G. Raymond | 3:21.00 | 30 | |
| 1949 | Foxzami (NZL) | 4 h | William Fellows | Dan Lewis | L. G. Robinson | 3:28.50 | 31 | |
| 1950 | Comic Court | 5 h | Pat Glennon | J. M. Cummings | R. A., J. D. & A. J. Lee | 3:19.50 | 26 | |
| 1951 | Delta | 5 h | Neville Sellwood | Maurice McCarten | Adolph Basser | 3:24.25 | 28 | |
| 1952 | Dalray (NZL) | 4 h | Bill Williamson | C. C. McCarthy | C. Neville | 3:23.75 | 30 | |
| 1953 | Wodalla | 4 h | Jack Purtell | Robert Sinclair | E. A. "Ted" Underwood | 3:23.75 | 21 | |
| 1954 | Rising Fast (NZL) | 5 g | Jack Purtell | Ivan Tucker | L. R. Spring | 3:23.00 | 25 | |
| 1955 | Toparoa (NZL) | 7 g | Neville Sellwood | T J Smith | N. H. McDonald | 3:28.25 | 24 | |
| 1956 | Evening Peal | 4 m | George Podmore | E. D. Lawson | Mr & Mrs R. White | 3:19.50 | 22 | |
| 1957 | Straight Draw (NZL) | 5 g | Noel L. McGrowdie | J. M. Mitchell | Ezra Norton | 3:24.50 | 19 | |
| 1958 | Baystone | 6 g | Mel Schumacher | Jack Green | R. A. & N. Burns | 3:21.25 | 29 | |
| 1959 | Macdougal (NZL) | 6 g | Pat Glennon | Richard W. Roden | R. N. & N. H. B. Brown | 3:23.00 | 28 | |
| 1960 | Hi Jinx (NZL) | 5 m | William A. Smith | Trevor H. Knowles | T. H. Knowles & K. R. Sly | 3:23.75 | 32 | |
| 1961 | Lord Fury | 4 h | Ray Selkrig | Frank B. Lewis | Mr & Mrs N. S. Cohen | 3:19.50 | 25 | |
| 1962 | Even Stevens (NZL) | 5 h | Les Coles | Arch McGregor | James Wattie | 3:21.40 | 26 | |
| 1963 | Gatum Gatum | 5 g | Jim Johnson | H. Graeme Heagney | M. P. Reid | 3:21.10 | 26 | |
| 1964 | Polo Prince (NZL) | 6 g | Ron Taylor (NZL) | John P. Carter | Mr & Mrs L. W. Davis | 3:19.60 | 26 | |
| 1965 | Light Fingers (NZL) | 4 m | Roy Higgins | Bart Cummings | W. J. Broderick | 3:21.10 | 26 | |
| 1966 | Galilee (NZL) | 4 g | John Miller | Bart Cummings | Mr & Mrs M. L. Bailey | 3:21.90 | 22 | |
| 1967 | Red Handed (NZL) | 5 g | Roy Higgins | Bart Cummings | F. W. Clarke, et al. | 3:20.40 | 22 | |
| 1968 | Rain Lover | 4 h | Jim Johnson | Mick L. Robins | Clifford A. Reid | 3:19.10 | 26 | |
| 1969 | Rain Lover | 5 h | Jim Johnson | Mick L. Robins | Clifford A Reid | 3:21.50 | 23 | |
| 1970 | Baghdad Note (NZL) | 5 g | Midge Didham (NZL) | Robert Heasley | E. C. S. Falconer | 3:19.70 | 23 | |
| 1971 | Silver Knight (NZL) | 4 h | Bruce Marsh (NZL) | Eric Temperton | Sir W. Norwood | 3:19.50 | 21 | |
| 1972 | Piping Lane | 6 g | John Letts | George Hanlon | R. W. Trinder | 3:19.30 | 22 | |
| 1973 | Gala Supreme | 4 g | Frank Reys | Ray Hutchins | J. P. Curtain | 3:19.50 | 24 | |
| 1974 | Think Big (NZL) | 4 g | Harry White | Bart Cummings | Dato Tan Chin Nam et al. | 3:23.10 | 22 | |
| 1975 | Think Big (NZL) | 5 g | Harry White | Bart Cummings | Dato Tan Chin Nam et al. | 3:29.60 | 20 | |
| 1976 | Van der Hum (NZL) | 5 g | Robert J. Skelton (NZL) | Len H. Robinson | L. H. & R. A. Robinson, et al. | 3:34.10 | 23 | |
| 1977 | Gold and Black (NZL) | 5 g | John Duggan | Bart Cummings | Mr & Mrs J. Harris, et al. | 3:18.40 | 24 | |
| 1978 | Arwon (NZL) | 5 g | Harry White | George Hanlon | Doon Bros Syndicate et al. | 3:24.30 | 22 | |
| 1979 | Hyperno (NZL) | 6 g | Harry White | Bart Cummings | Mr & Mrs T. L. North, et al. | 3:21.80 | 22 | |
| 1980 | Beldale Ball (USA) | 5 h | John Letts | Colin Hayes | Swettenham Stud Syndicate | 3:19.80 | 22 | |
| 1981 | Just A Dash | 4 g | Peter Cook | T J Smith | Lloyd Williams et al. | 3:21.20 | 22 | |
| 1982 | Gurner's Lane (NZL) | 4 g | Mick Dittman | Geoff Murphy | Williams St. Syndicate No 2 | 3:21.20 | 23 | |
| 1983 | Kiwi (NZL) | 6 g | Jim Cassidy (NZL) | Ewen S. Lupton | Mr & Mrs E. S. Lupton | 3:18.90 | 24 | |
| 1984 | Black Knight | 5 g | Peter Cook | George Hanlon | Robert Holmes à Court | 3:18.90 | 19 | |
| 1985 | What A Nuisance (NZL) | 7 g | Pat Hyland | John Meagher | Lloyd Williams et al. | 3:23.00 | 23 | |
| 1986 | At Talaq (USA) | 6 h | Michael Clarke | Colin Hayes | Shadwell Racing | 3:21.70 | 22 | |
| 1987 | Kensei (NZL) | 5 g | Larry Olsen | Les J. Bridge | K. M. Mitchell, et al. | 3:22.00 | 21 | |
| 1988 | Empire Rose (NZL) | 6 m | Tony Allan (NZL) | Laurie Laxon | Mr & Mrs F. R. Bodle | 3:18.90 | 22 | |
| 1989 | Tawrrific (NZL) | 5 h | Shane Dye | Lee Freedman | B. F. Avery, et al. | 3:17.10 | 23 | |
| 1990 | Kingston Rule (USA) | 5 h | Darren Beadman | Bart Cummings | Mr & Mrs D. H. Hains | 3:16.30 | 24 | |
| 1991 | Let's Elope (NZL) | 4 m | Steven King | Bart Cummings | Shoreham Park Syndicate | 3:18.90 | 24 | |
| 1992 | Subzero | 4 h | Greg Hall | Lee Freedman | D H K Investments | 3:24.70 | 21 | |
| 1993 | Vintage Crop (IRE) | 7 g | Michael Kinane (IRE) | Dermot K. Weld | Dr M. W. Smurfit | 3:23.40 | 24 | |
| 1994 | Jeune (GBR) | 6 h | Wayne Harris | David Hayes | Shadwell Racing | 3:19.80 | 24 | |
| 1995 | Doriemus (NZL) | 5 g | Damien Oliver | Lee Freedman | Pacers Australia Syndicate | 3:27.60 | 21 | |
| 1996 | Saintly | 4 g | Darren Beadman | Bart Cummings | Dato Tan Chin Nam et al. | 3:18.80 | 22 | |
| 1997 | Might and Power (NZL) | 4 h | Jim Cassidy (NZL) | Jack Denham | Mr N. Moraitis | 3:18.33 | 22 | |
| 1998 | Jezabeel (NZL) | 6 m | Chris Munce | Brian Jenkins | A. K. Burr, et al. | 3:18.59 | 24 | |
| 1999 | Rogan Josh | 7 g | John Marshall | Bart Cummings | Mrs W. L. Green, et al. | 3:19.64 | 24 | |
| 2000 | Brew (NZL) | 6 g | Kerrin McEvoy | Mike Moroney | Gurner's Bloodstock Co. | 3:18.68 | 22 | |
| 2001 | Ethereal (NZL) | 4 m | Scott Seamer | Sheila Laxon | Sir Peter James & Philip Malcolm Vela | 3:21.08 | 22 | |
| 2002 | Media Puzzle (USA) | 6 g | Damien Oliver | Dermot K. Weld | Dr M. W. Smurfit, et al. | 3:16.97 | 23 | |
| 2003 | Makybe Diva (GBR) | 5 m | Glen Boss | David Hall | Emily Krstina Syndicate | 3:19.90 | 23 | |
| 2004 | Makybe Diva (GBR) | 6 m | Glen Boss | Lee Freedman | Emily Krstina Syndicate | 3:28.55 | 24 | |
| 2005 | Makybe Diva (GBR) | 7 m | Glen Boss | Lee Freedman | Emily Krstina Syndicate | 3:19.17 | 24 | |
| 2006 | Delta Blues (JPN) | 6 h | Yasunari Iwata (JPN) | Katsuhiko Sumii | Sunday Racing Co Ltd | 3:21.47 | 23 | |
| 2007 | Efficient (NZL) | 4 g | Michael Rodd | Graeme Rogerson | Lloyd Williams et al. | 3:23.34 | 21 | |
| 2008 | Viewed | 5 h | Blake Shinn | Bart Cummings | Dato Tan Chin Nam et al. | 3:20.40 | 22 | |
| 2009 | Shocking | 4 h | Corey Brown | Mark Kavanagh | Eales Racing Pty Ltd | 3:23.87 | 23 | |
| 2010 | Americain (USA) | 6 h | Gérald Mossé (FRA) | Alain de Royer-Dupré | Gerry Ryan, K. C Bamford | 3:26.87 | 23 | |
| 2011 | Dunaden (FRA) | 6 h | Christophe Lemaire (FRA) | Mikel Delzangles | Pearl Bloodstock Pty (Mgr. R Levitt) | 3:20.84 | 23 | |
| 2012 | Green Moon (IRE) | 6 h | Brett Prebble | Robert Hickmott | Lloyd Williams et al. | 3:20.45 | 24 | |
| 2013 | Fiorente (IRE) | 6 h | Damien Oliver | Gai Waterhouse | Andrew Roberts et al. | 3:20.30 | 24 | |
| 2014 | Protectionist (GER) | 5 h | Ryan Moore (ENG) | Andreas Wöhler | Australian Bloodstock et al. | 3:17.71 | 22 | |
| 2015 | Prince of Penzance (NZL) | 6 g | Michelle Payne | Darren Weir | A McGregor et al. | 3:23.15 | 24 | |
| 2016 | Almandin (GER) | 7 g | Kerrin McEvoy | Robert Hickmott | Lloyd Williams et al. | 3:20.58 | 24 | |
| 2017 | Rekindling (GBR) | 4 h | Corey Brown | Joseph O'Brien | Lloyd Williams et al. | 3:21.29 | 23 | |
| 2018 | Cross Counter (GBR) | 4 g | Kerrin McEvoy | Charlie Appleby | Godolphin | 3:21.17 | 24 | |
| 2019 | Vow And Declare | 4 g | Craig Williams | Danny O'Brien | G Corrigan et al. | 3:24.76 | 24 | |
| 2020 | Twilight Payment (IRE) | 8 g | Jye McNeil | Joseph O'Brien | Lloyd Williams et al. | 3:17.34 | 23 | |
| 2021 | Verry Elleegant (NZL) | 6 m | James McDonald (NZL) | Chris Waller | Jomara Bloodstock Ltd et al. | 3:17.43 | 23 | |
| 2022 | Gold Trip (FRA) | 5 h | Mark Zahra | Ciaron Maher & David Eustace | Australian Bloodstock et al. | 3:24.04 | 22 | |
| 2023 | Without A Fight (IRE) | 7 g | Mark Zahra | Anthony & Sam Freedman | Sheikh Mohammed Obaid al Maktoum. | 3:18.37 | 23 | |
| 2024 | Knight's Choice | 5 g | Robbie Dolan (IRE) | John Symons & Sheila Laxon | C A Bain, Mrs K J Waldron & R A Waldron | 3:19.53 | 23 | |
| 2025 | Half Yours | 5 g | Jamie Melham | Tony & Calvin McEvoy | Kildalton Park Racing | 3:22.46 | 24 | |
| 2026 | Point Of Law (GBR) | 4 h | Ethan Brown | Ciaron Maher | Deg Racing, A R E Investments, Symphony Racing 3, Chris Judd, Ciaron Maher Racing, et al. | 3:21.88 | 23 | |

- The shortest-priced favourite in Cup history was Phar Lap when he won in 1930 at 8-11 ($1.72).
- Metrication – The race was originally held over two miles (about 3,218 metres), but following Australia's adoption of the Metric system in the 1970s the current distance of 3,200 metres was adopted in 1972. This reduced the distance by 61 ft 6 in (18.75 m), and Rain Lover's 1968 race record of 3min.19.1sec was accordingly adjusted to 3min.17.9sec. The present record holder is the 1990 winner Kingston Rule with a time of 3 min and 16.3 sec.

== Winners gallery ==
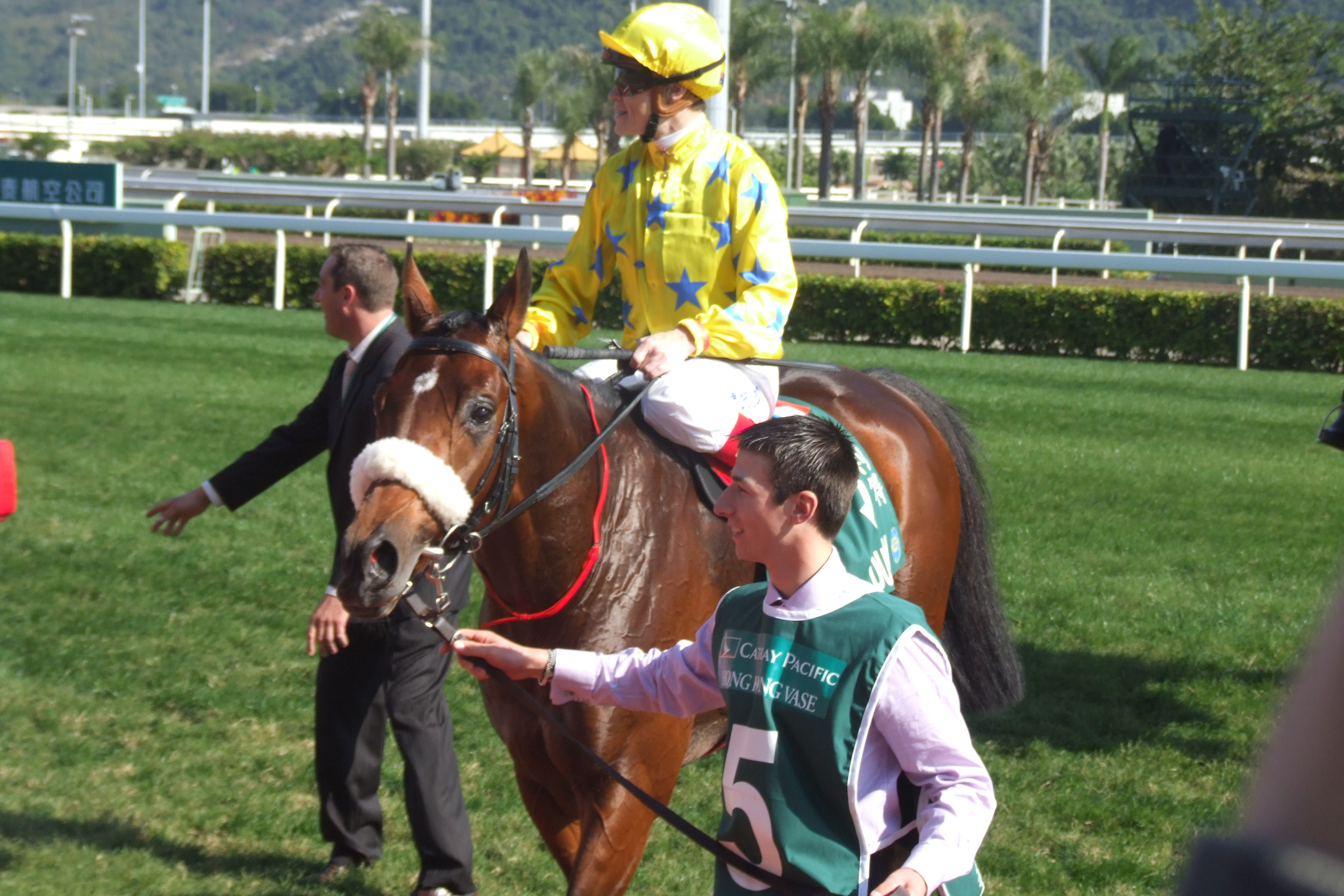
Dunaden 2011

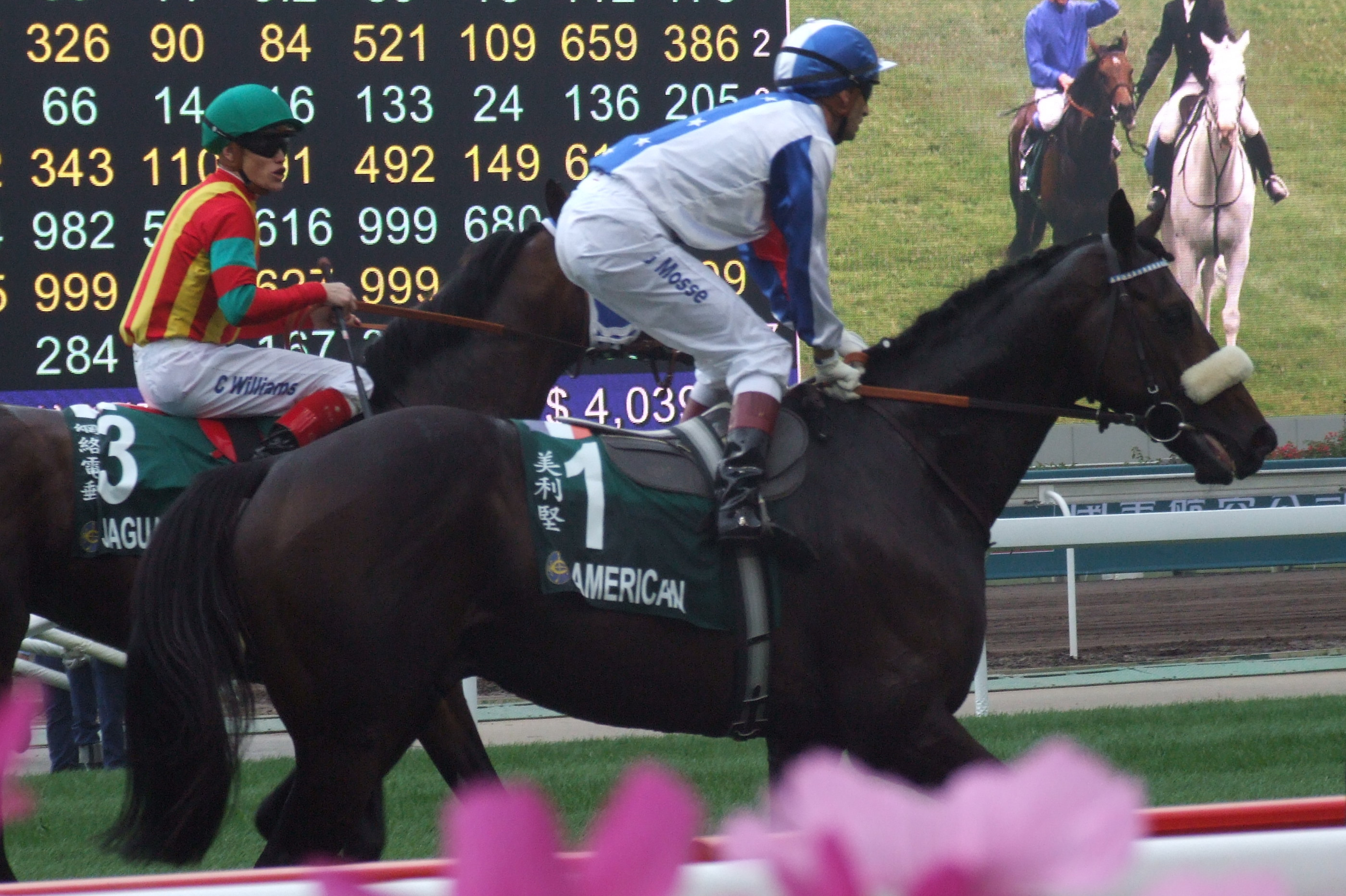
Americain 2010

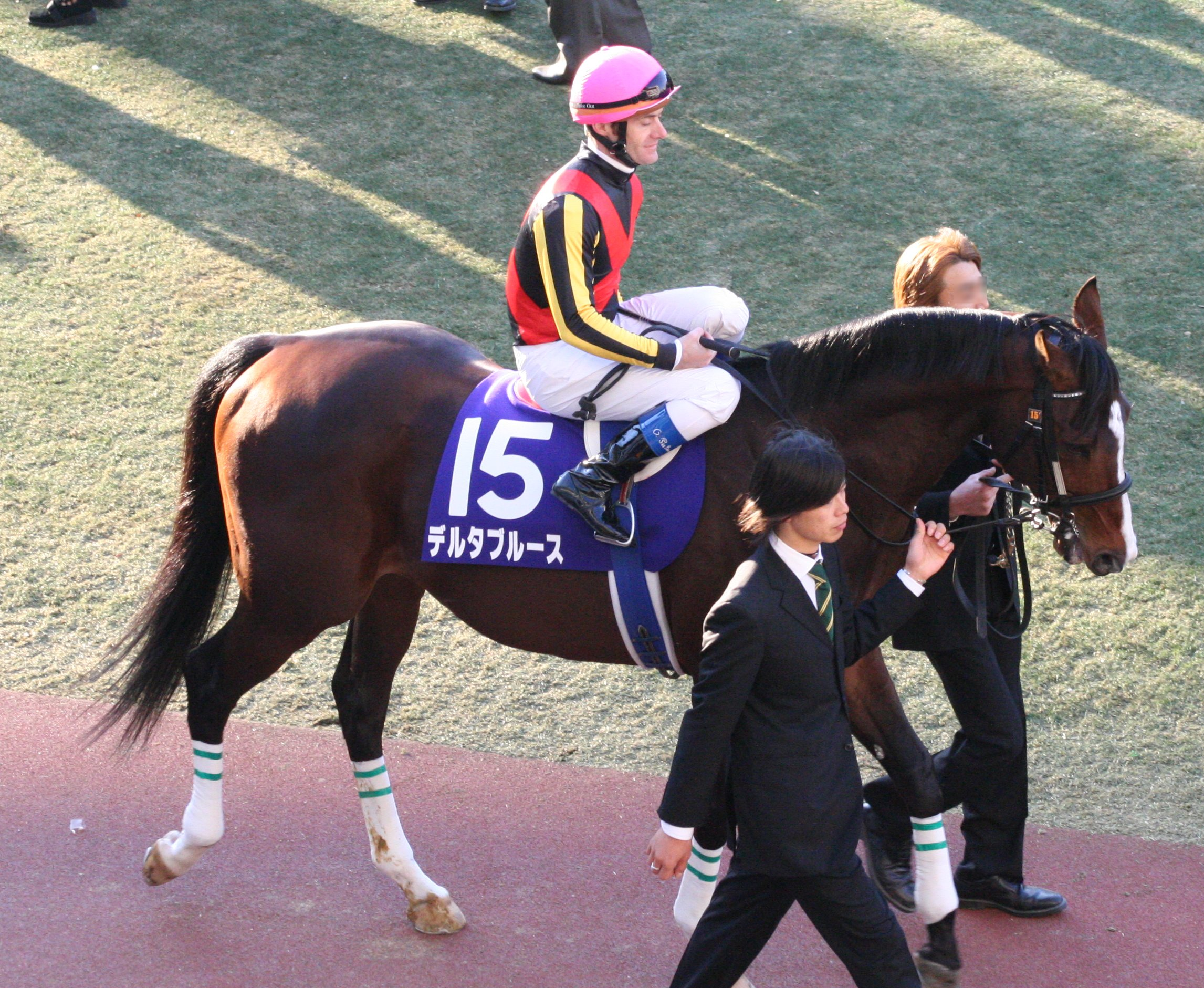
Delta Blues 2006

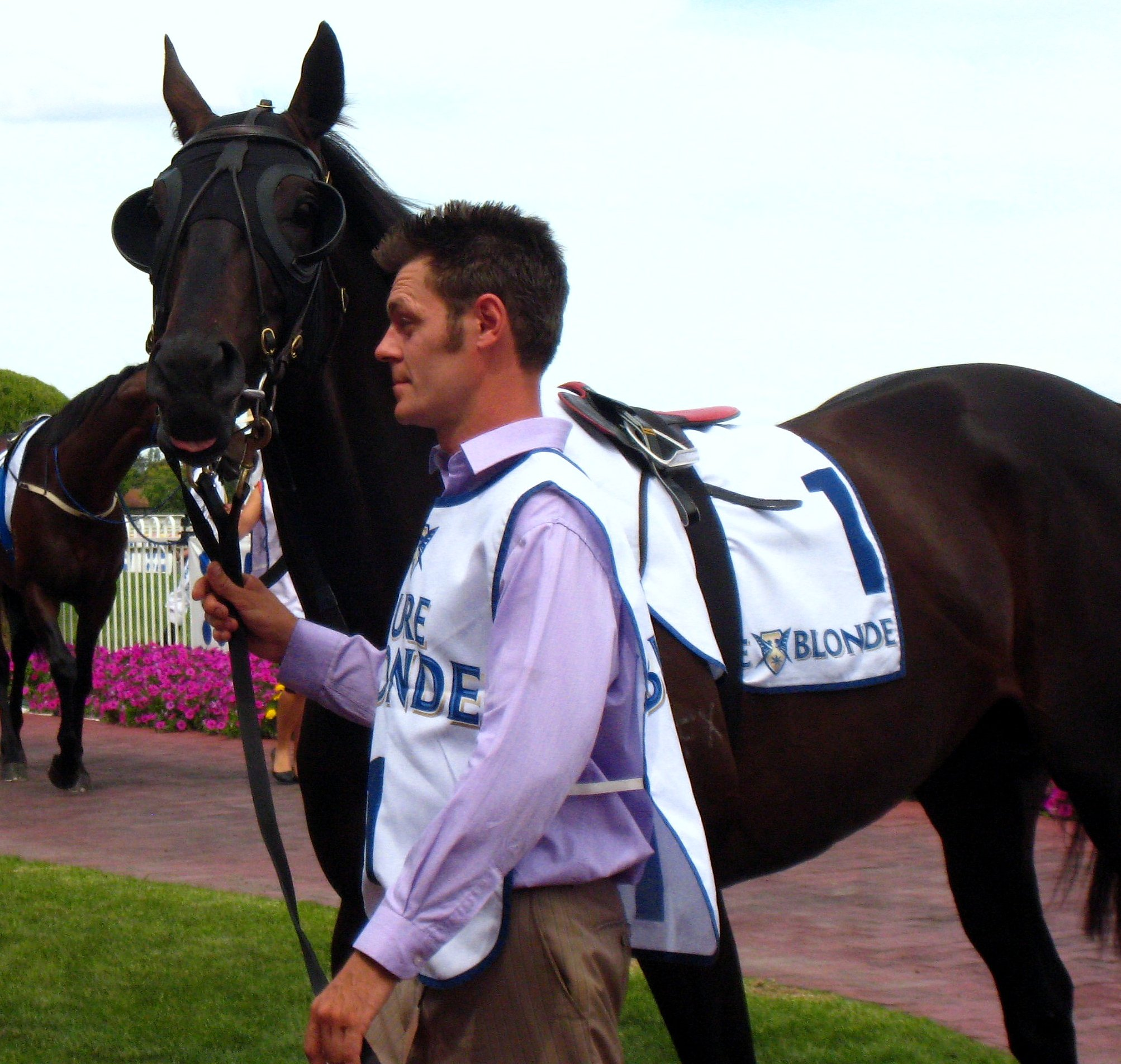
Viewed 2008

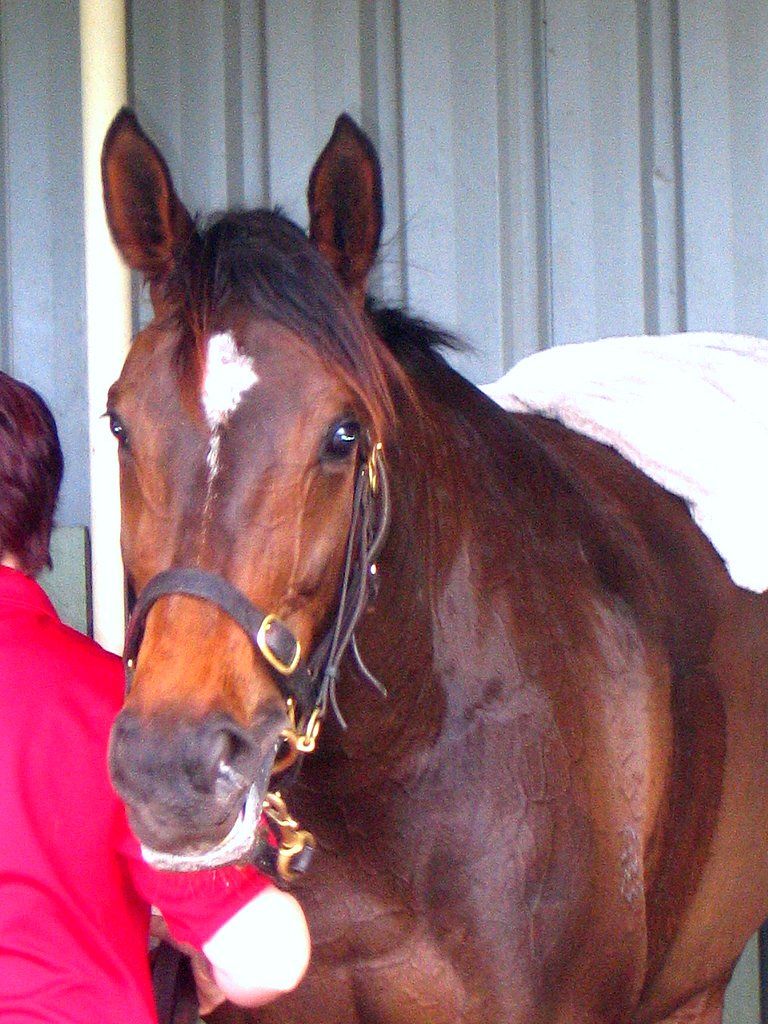
Makybe Diva 2003 2004 2005

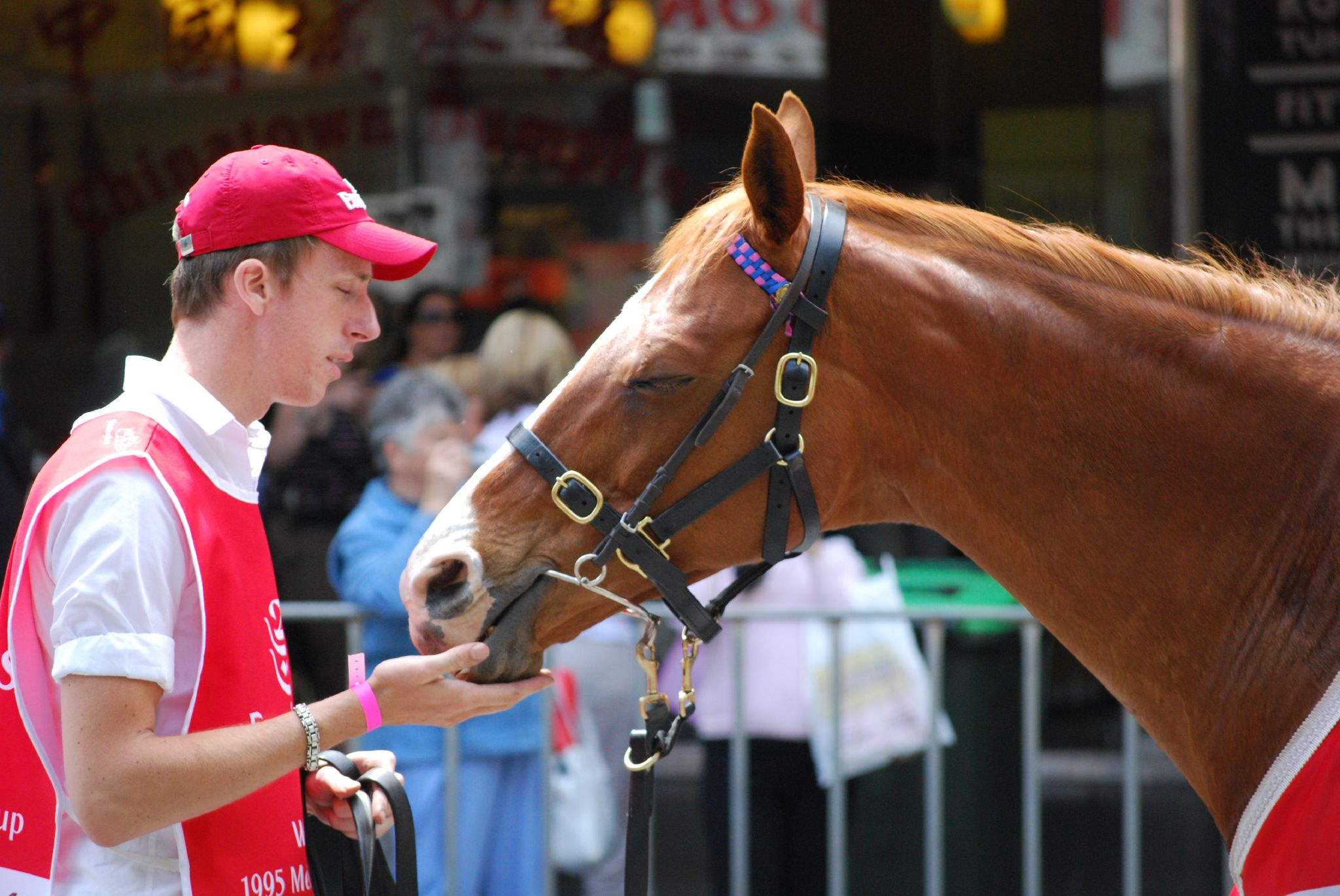
Doriemus 1995

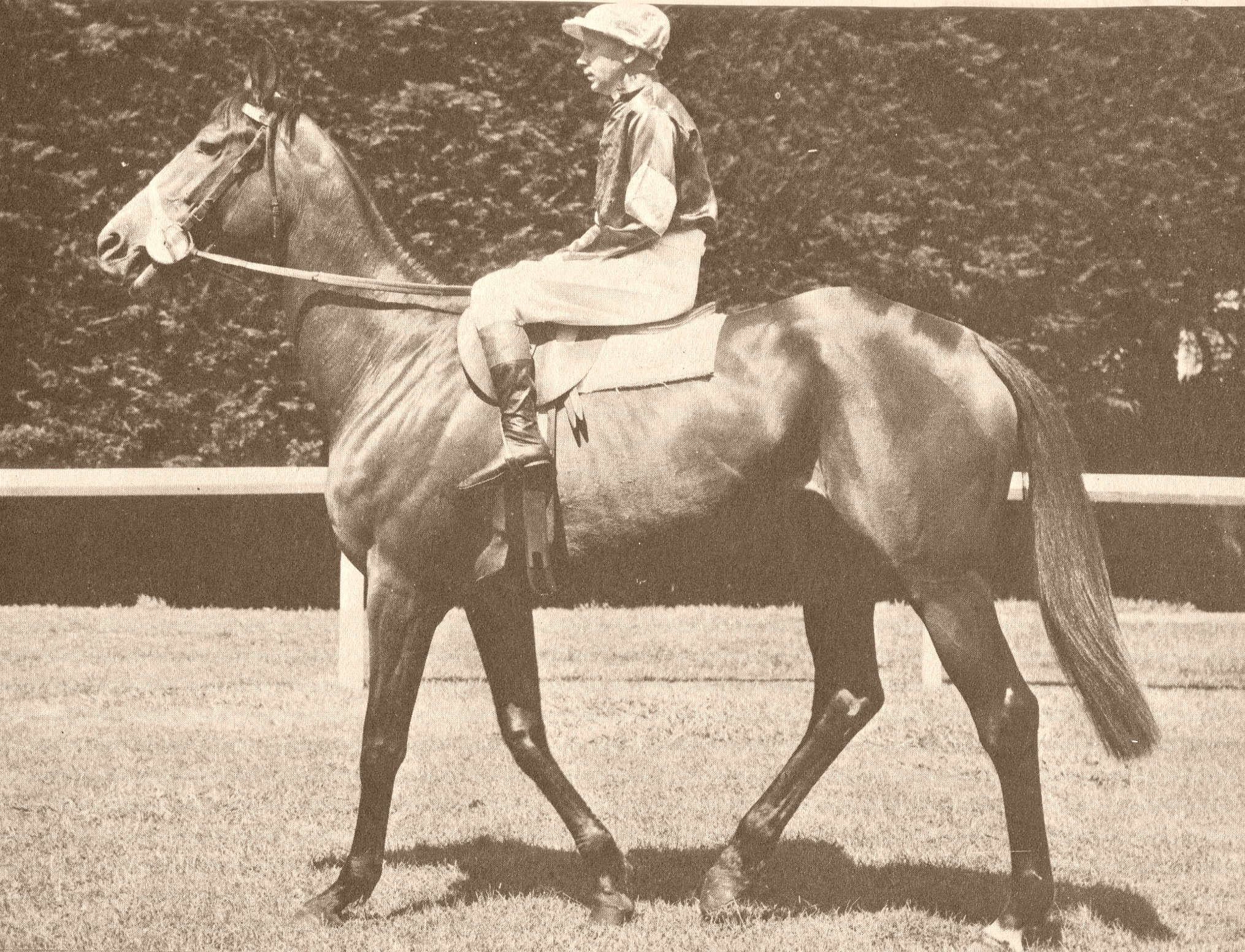
Hi Jinx 1960

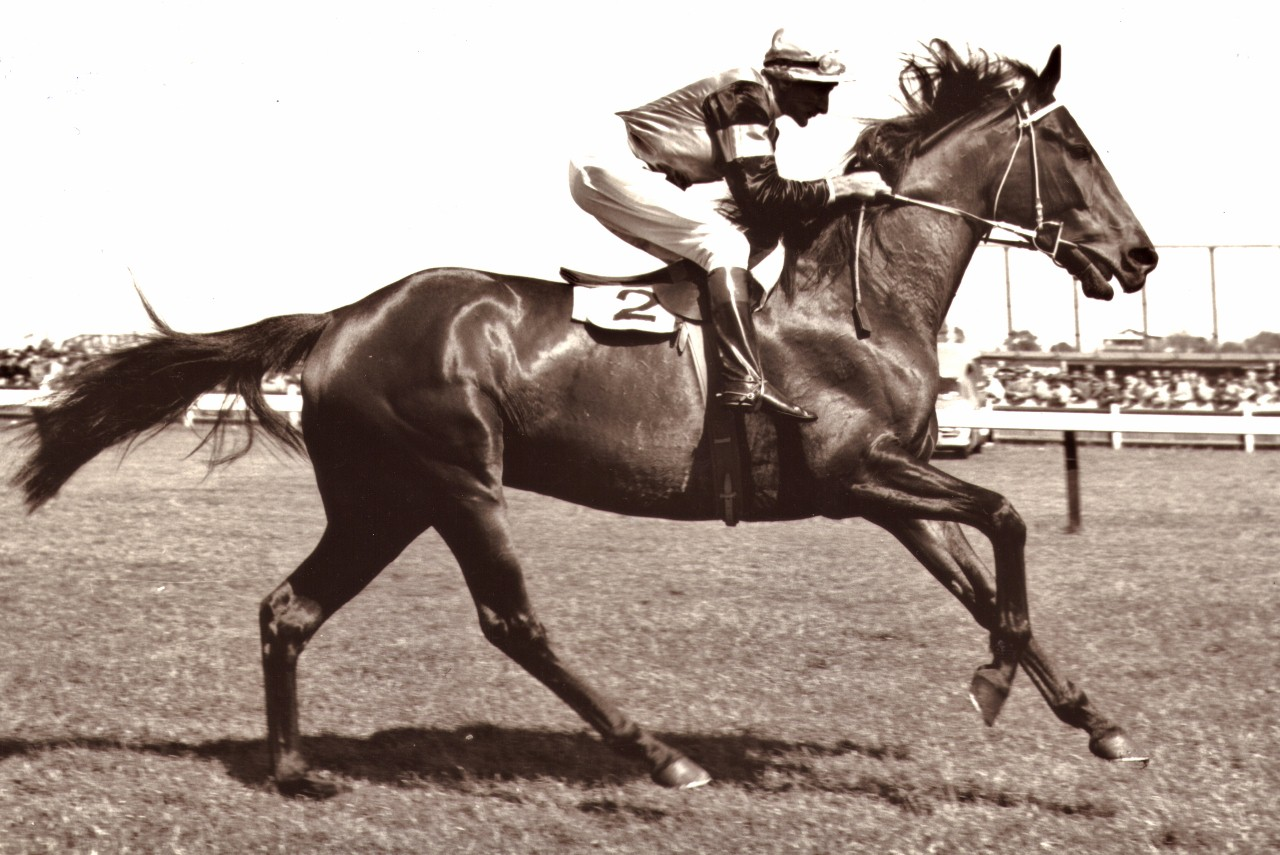
Rising Fast 1954

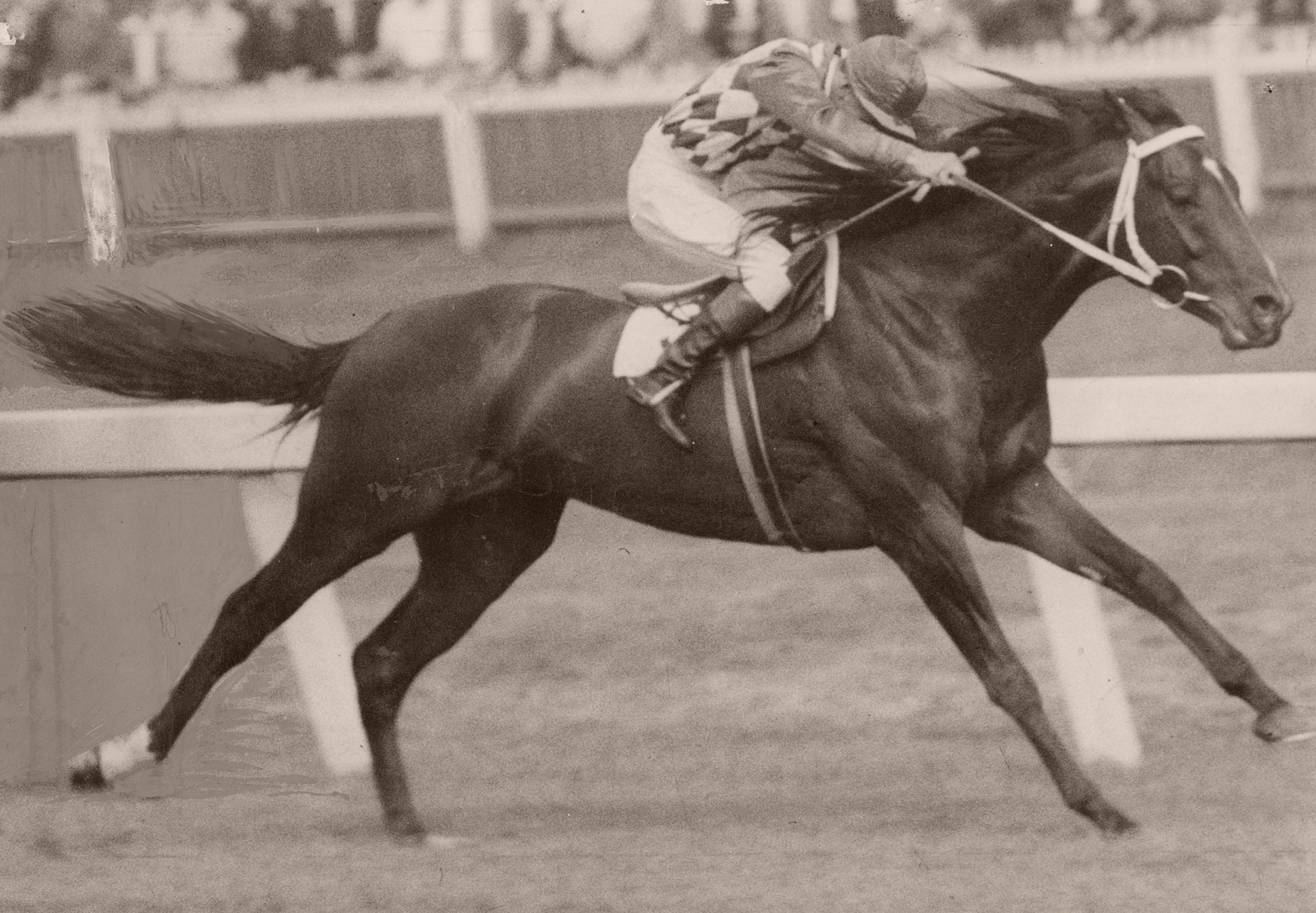
Comic Court 1950

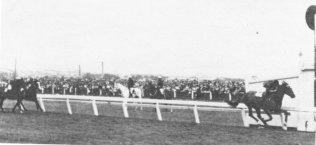
Russia 1946

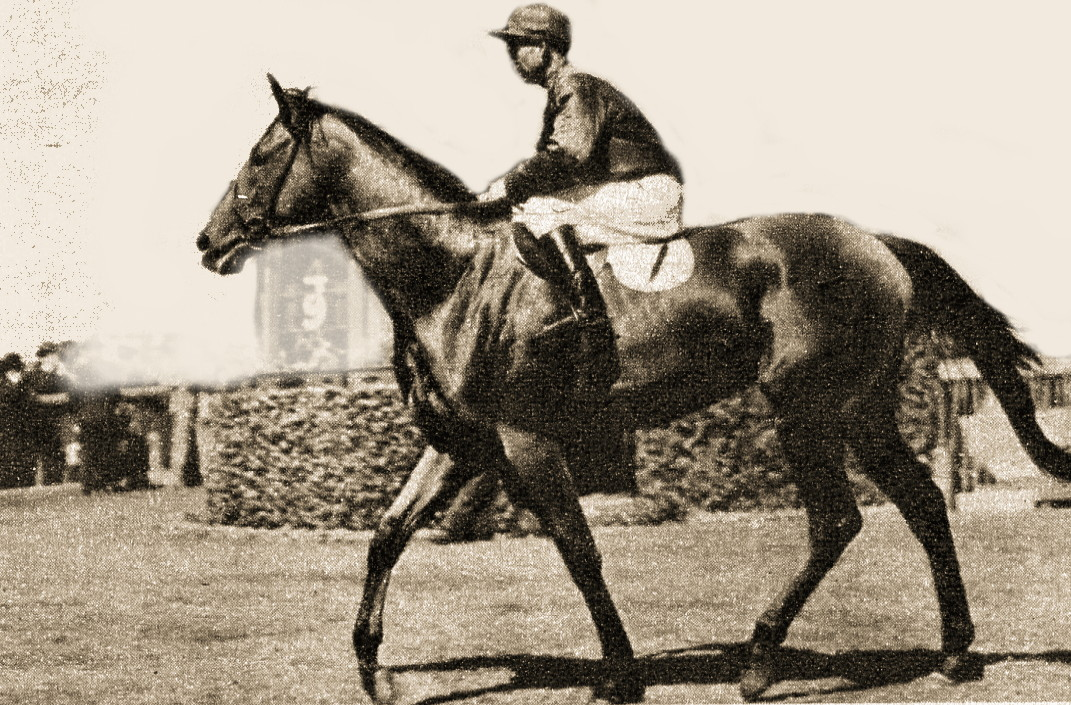
The Trump 1937

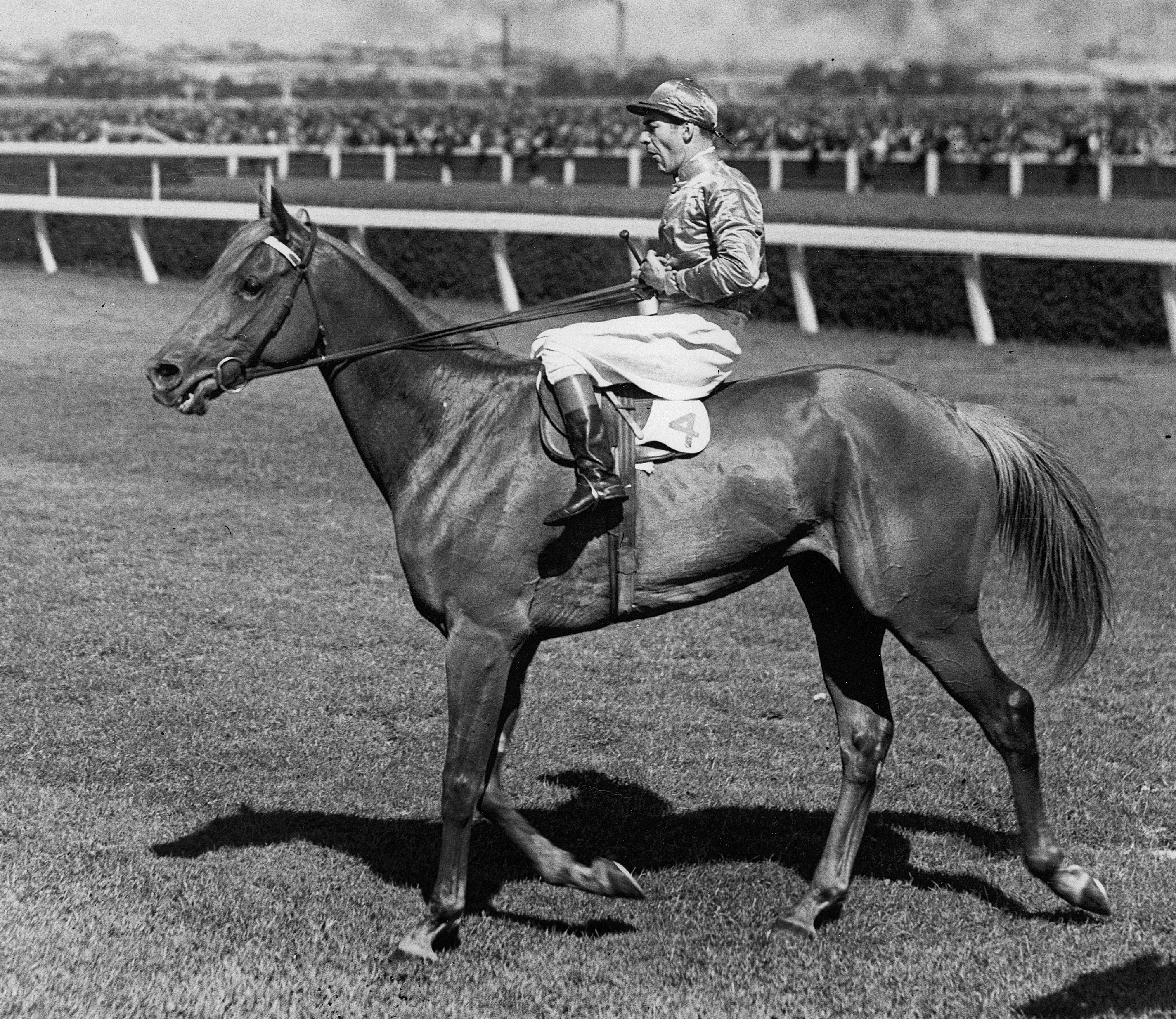
Peter Pan 1932 1934

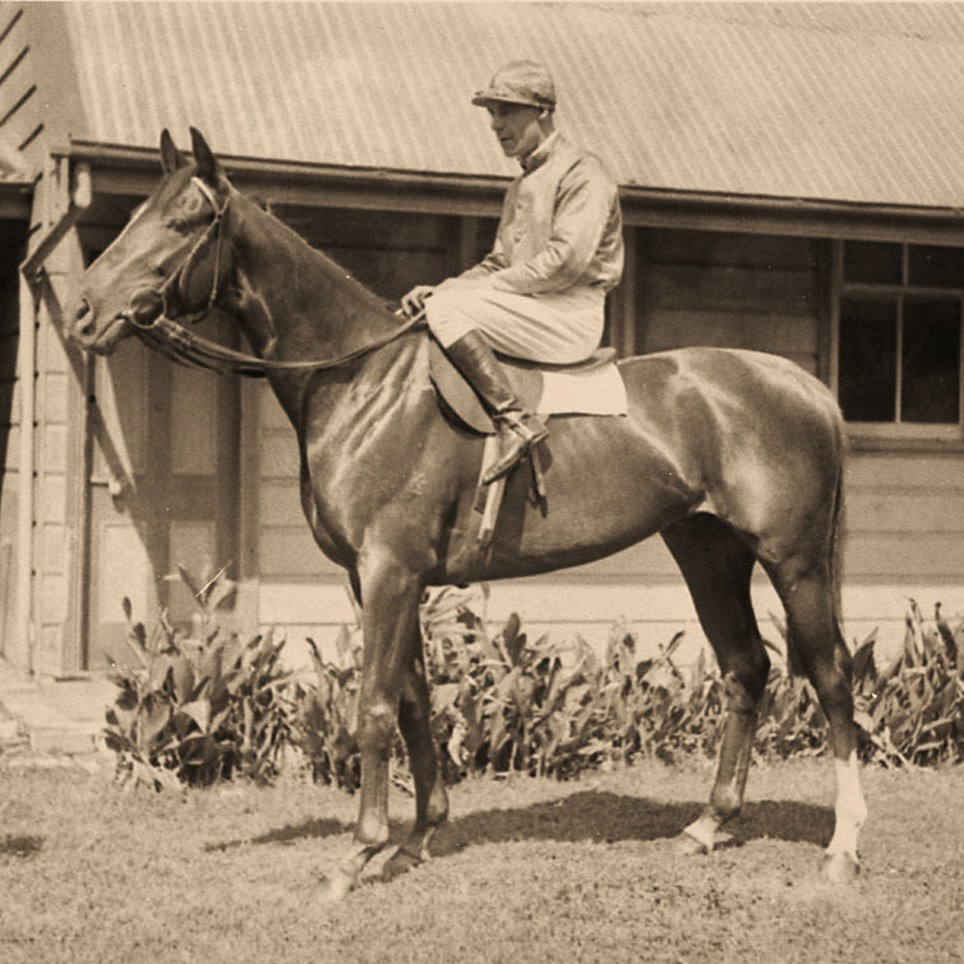
Hall Mark 1933

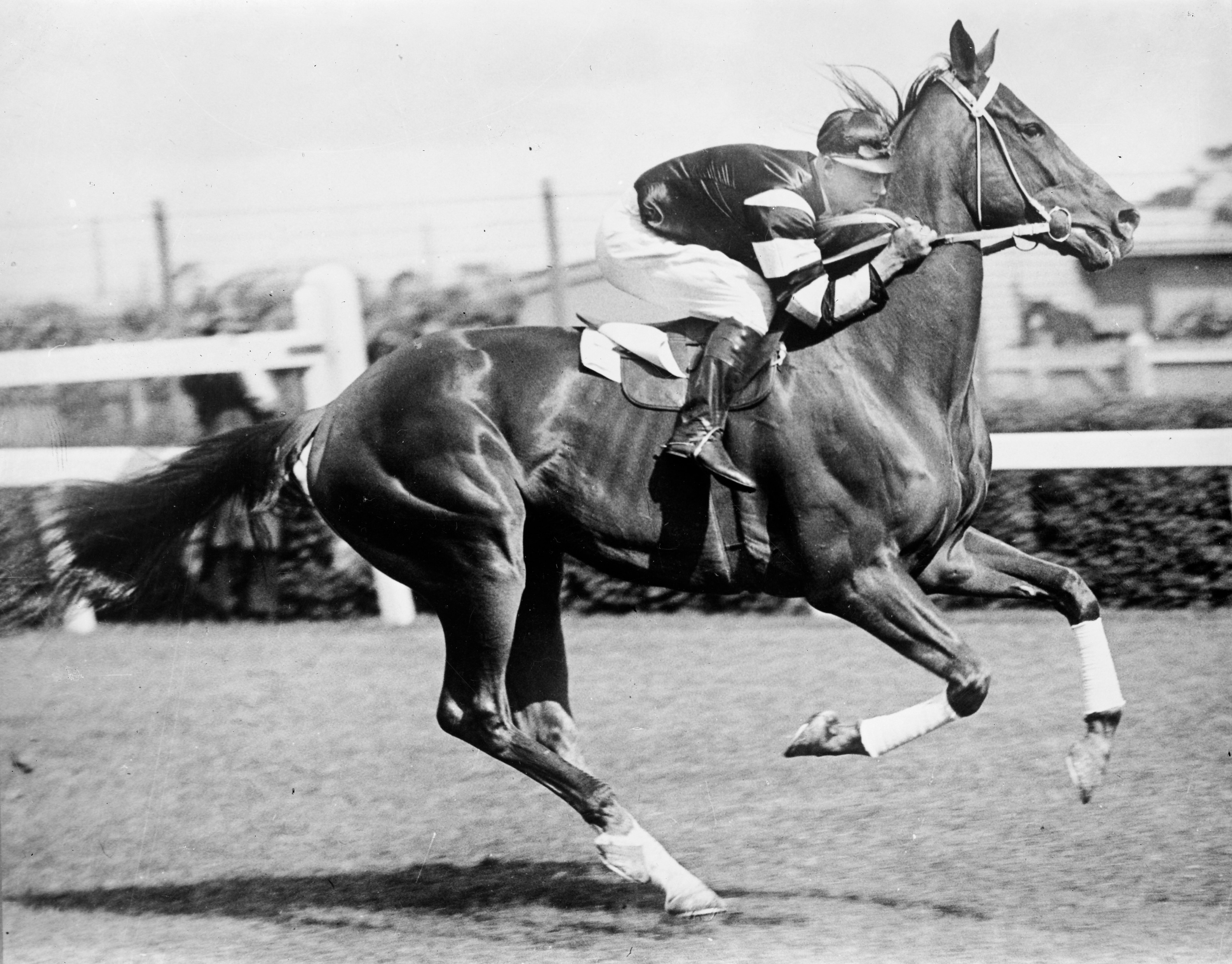
Phar Lap 1930

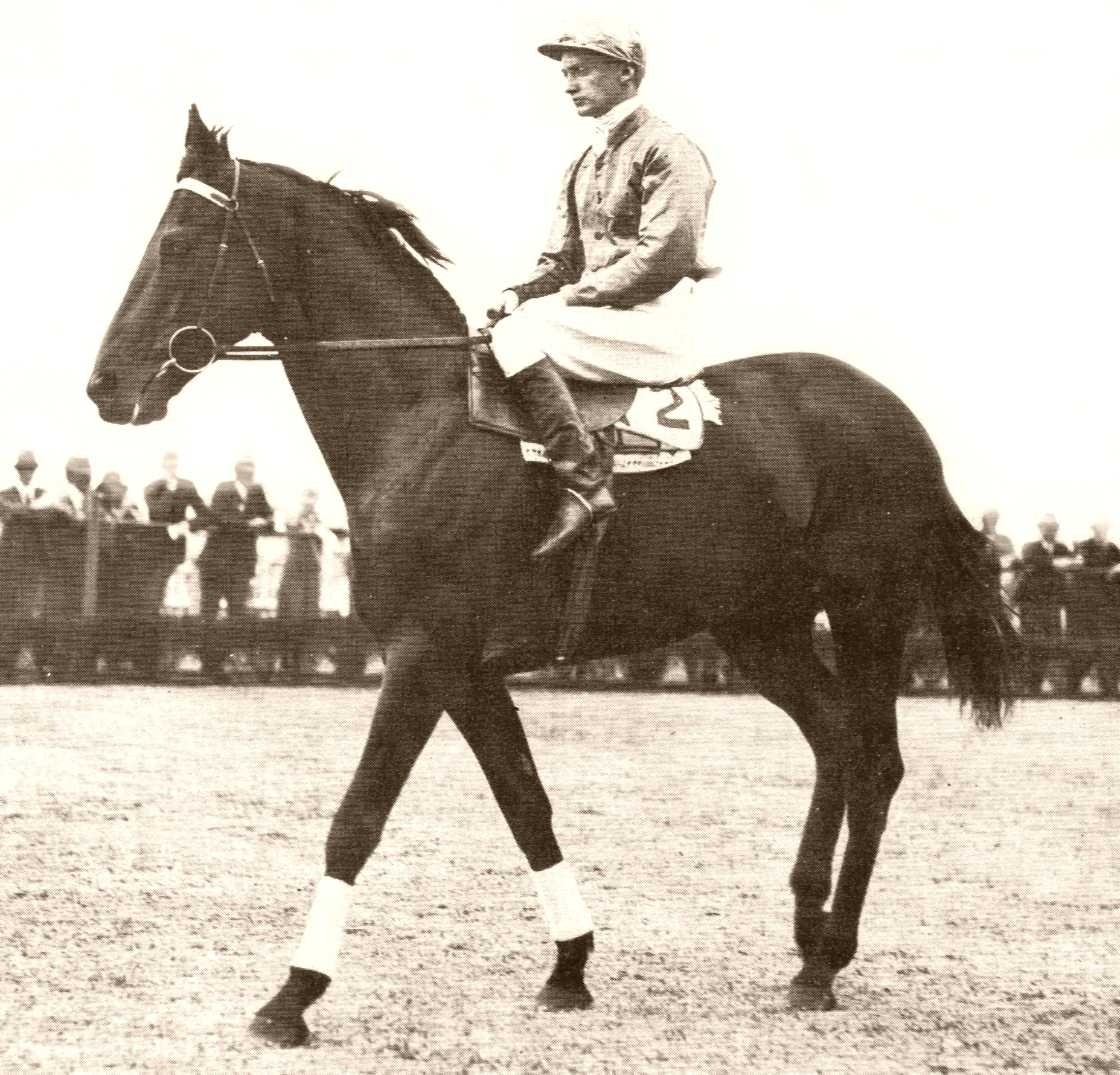
Nightmarch 1929

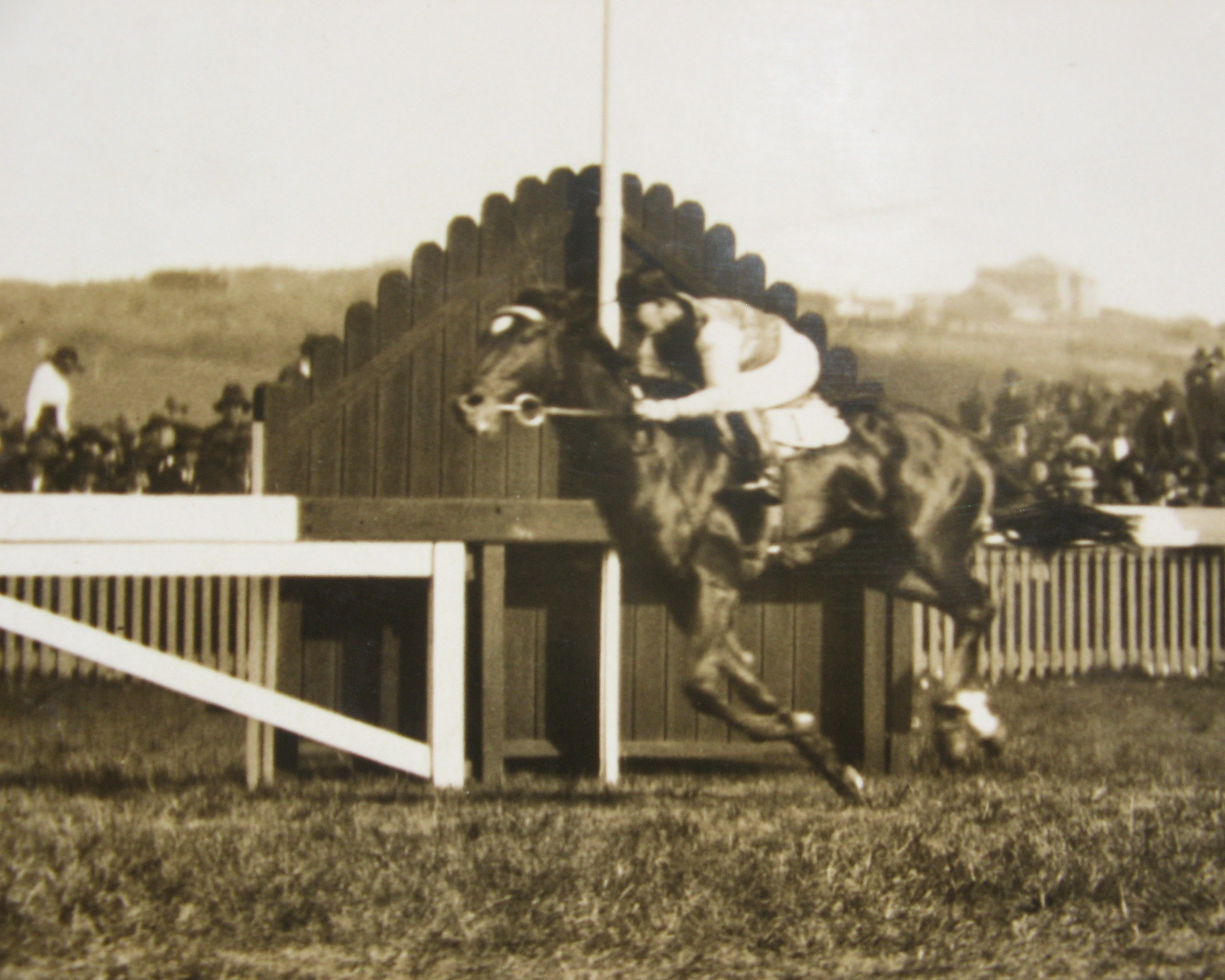
Poitrel 1920

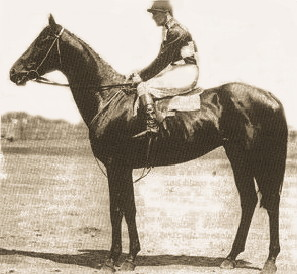
Comedy King 1910

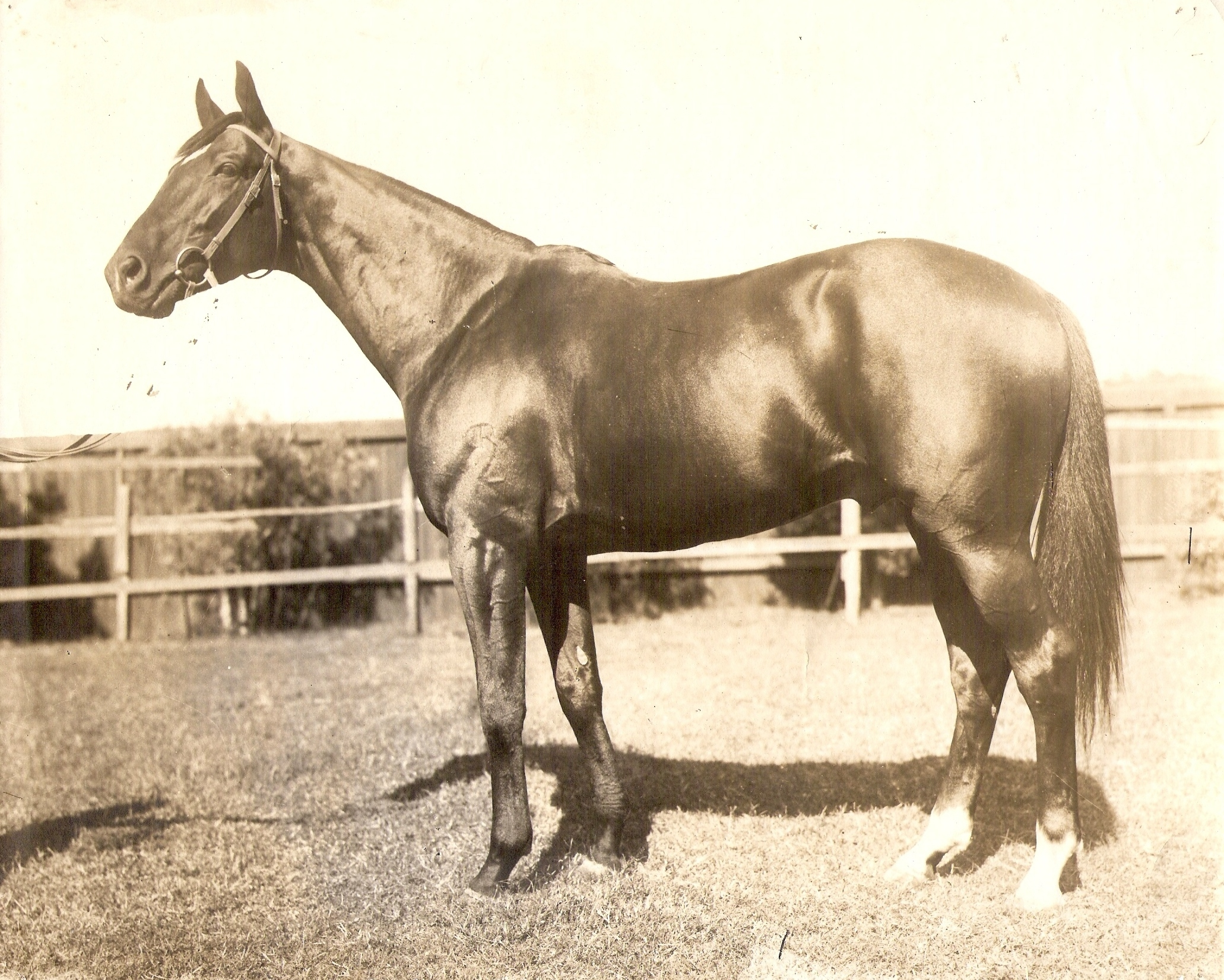
Poseidon 1906

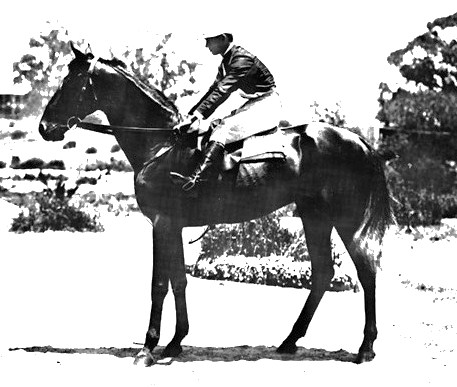
Blue Spec 1905

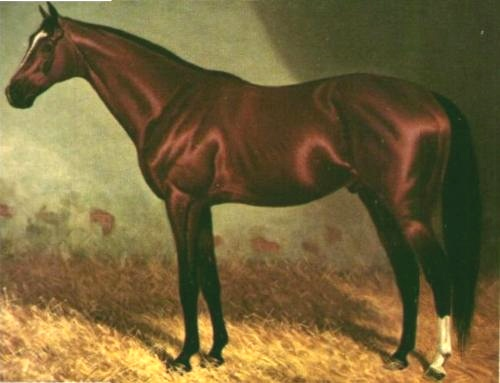
Carbine 1890

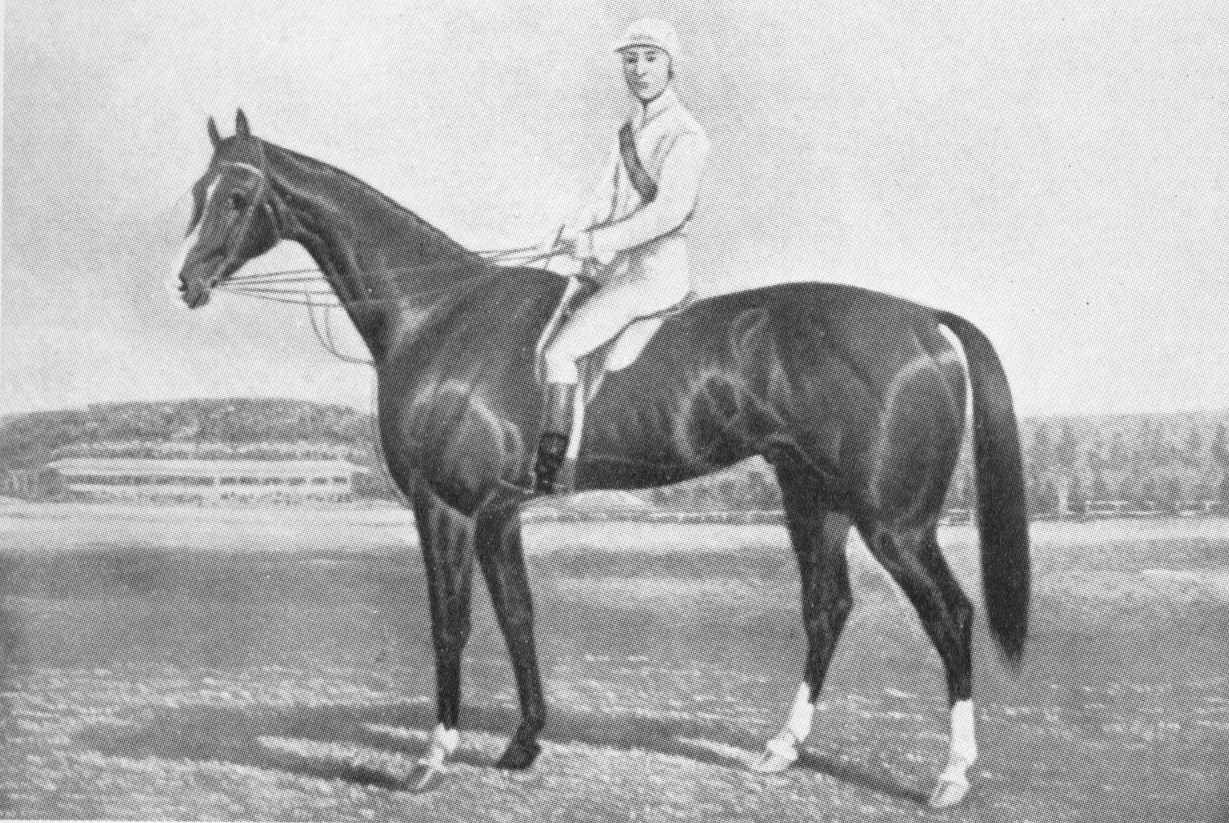
Malua 1884

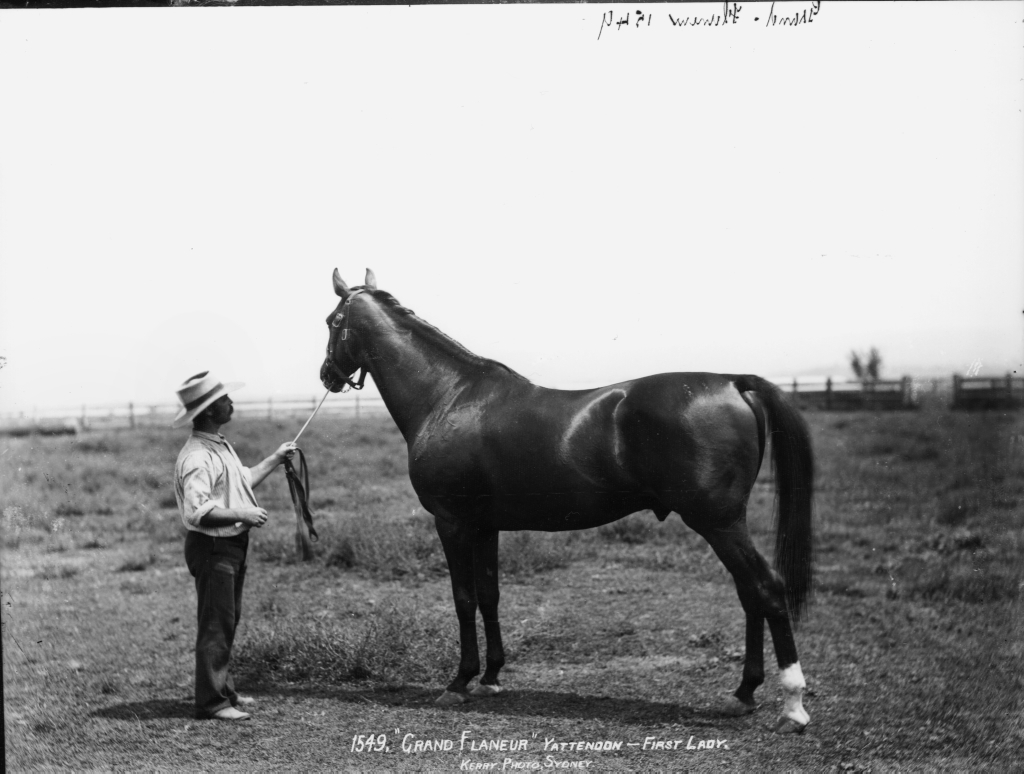
Grand Flaneur 1880

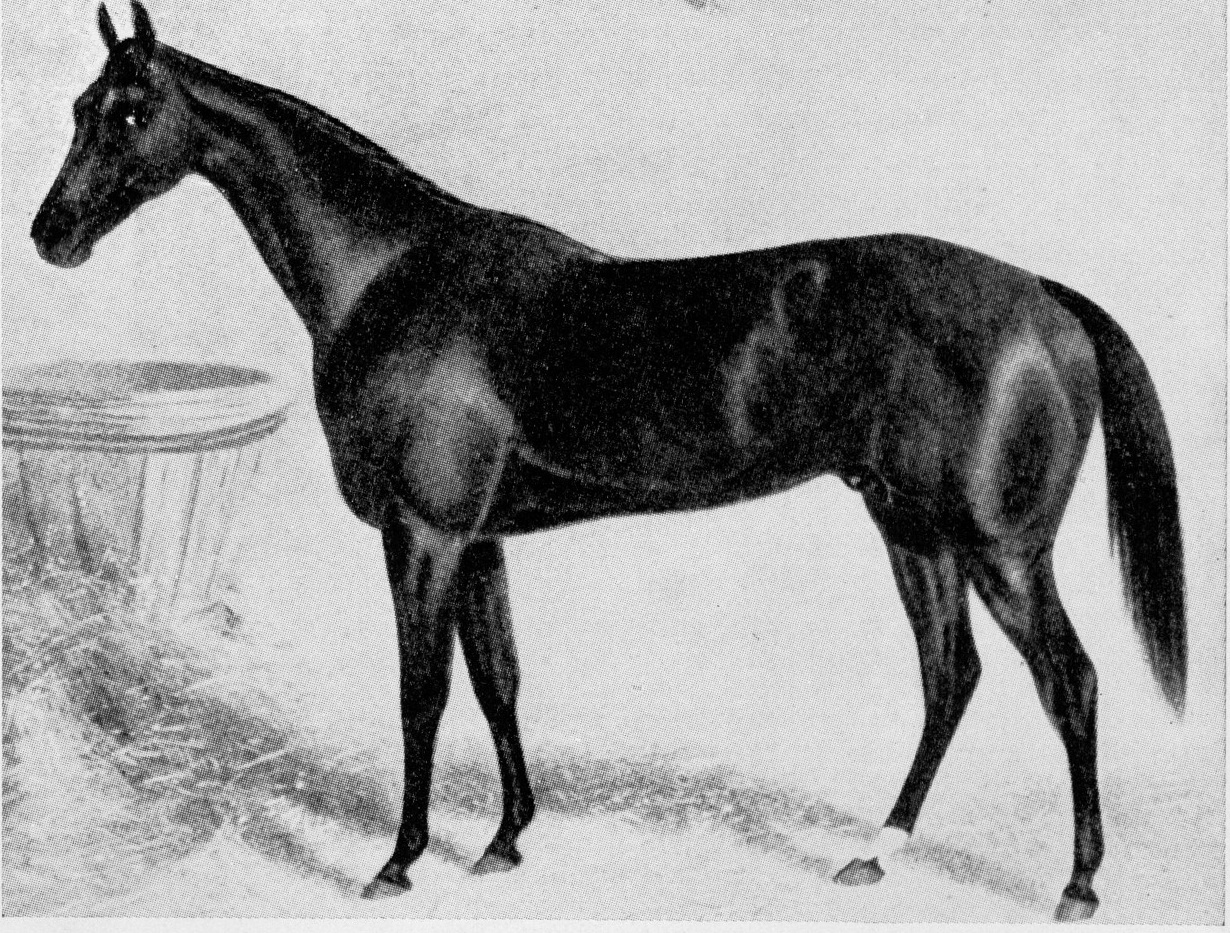
Chester 1877

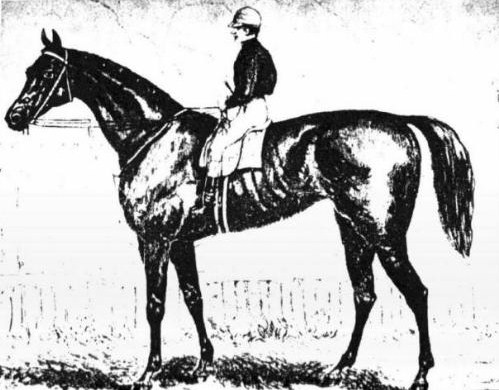
Briseis 1876

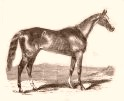
Glencoe 1868

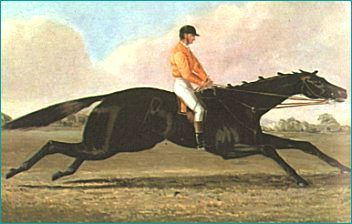
The Barb 1866

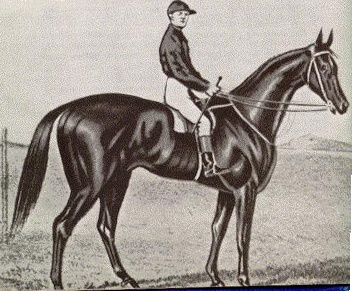
Archer 1861 1862

== 1934 racebook ==
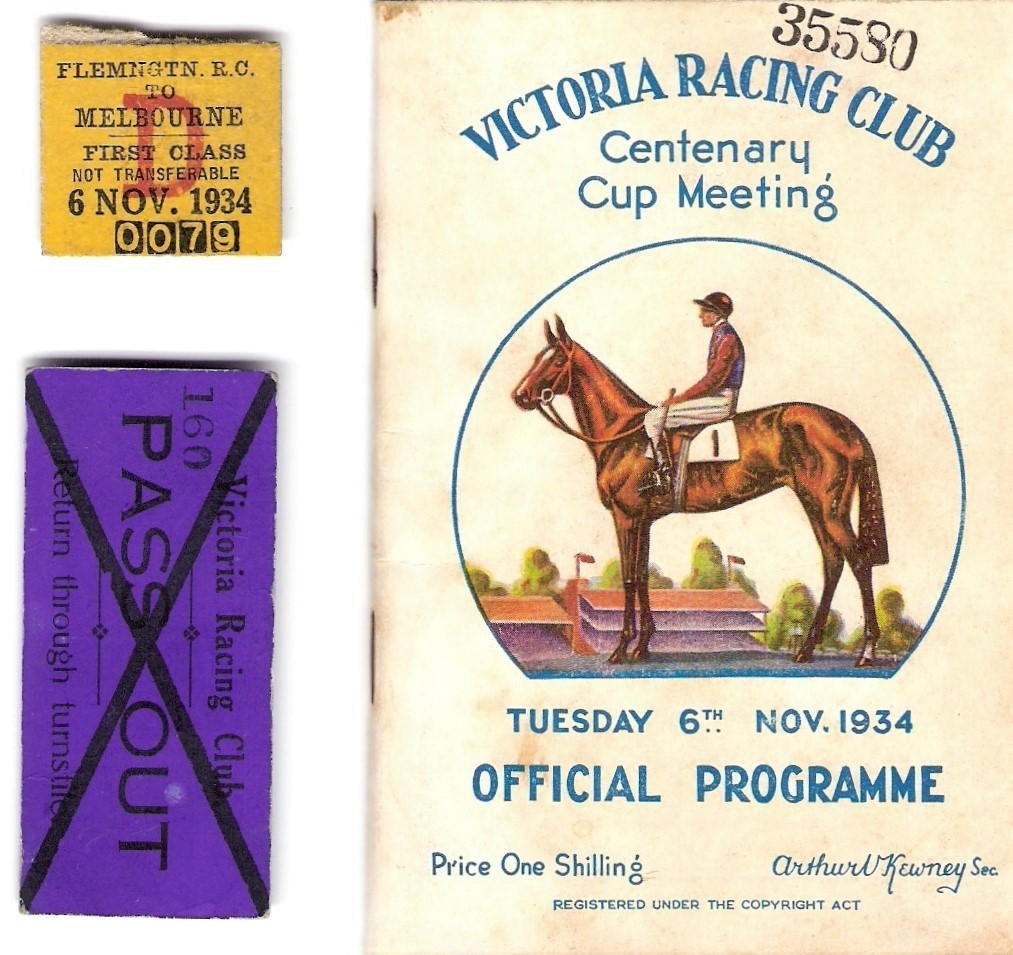
1934 VRC Melbourne Cup racebook with train & turnstile passes

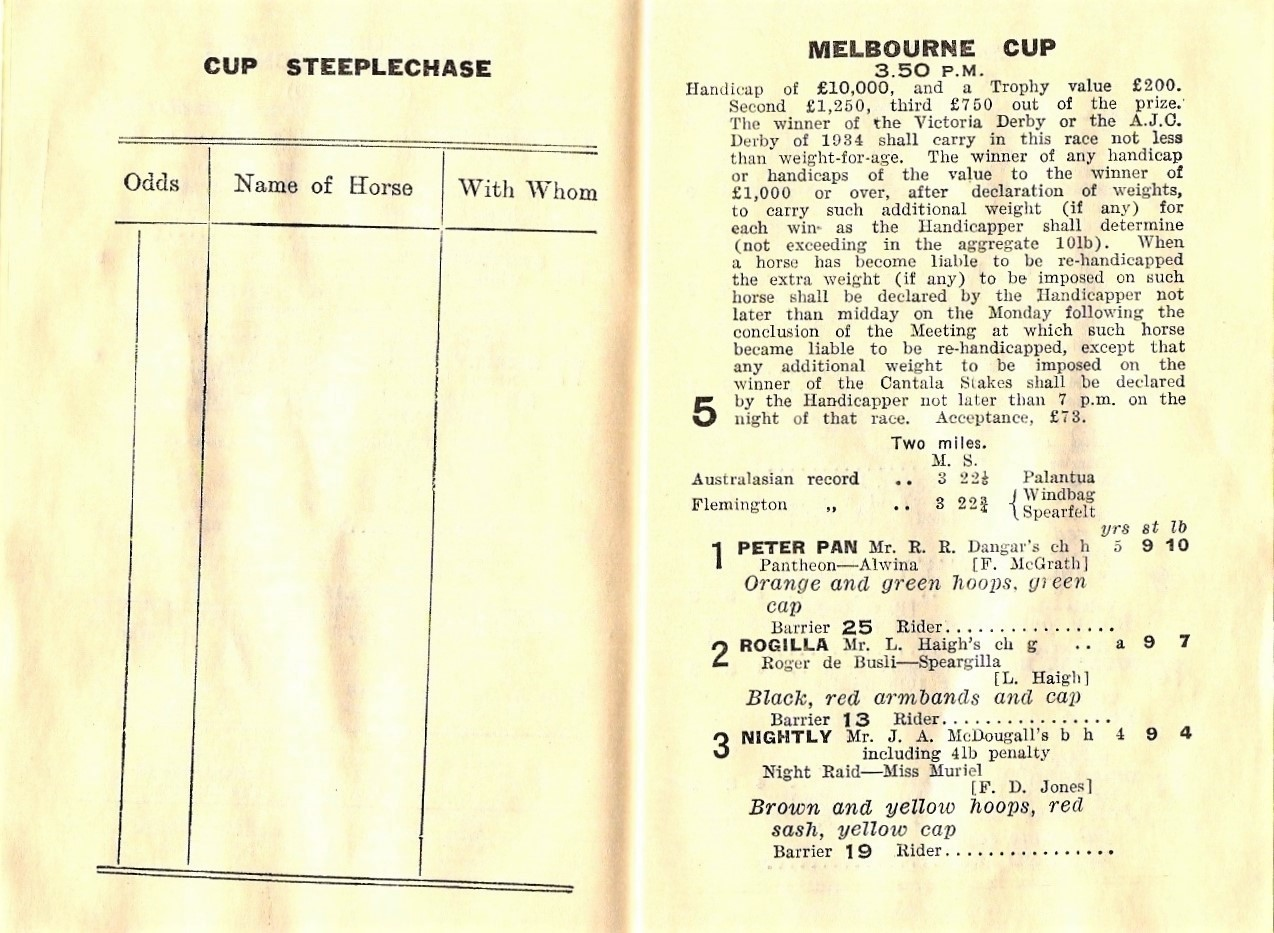
Conditions & starters 1934 VRC Melbourne Cup racebook

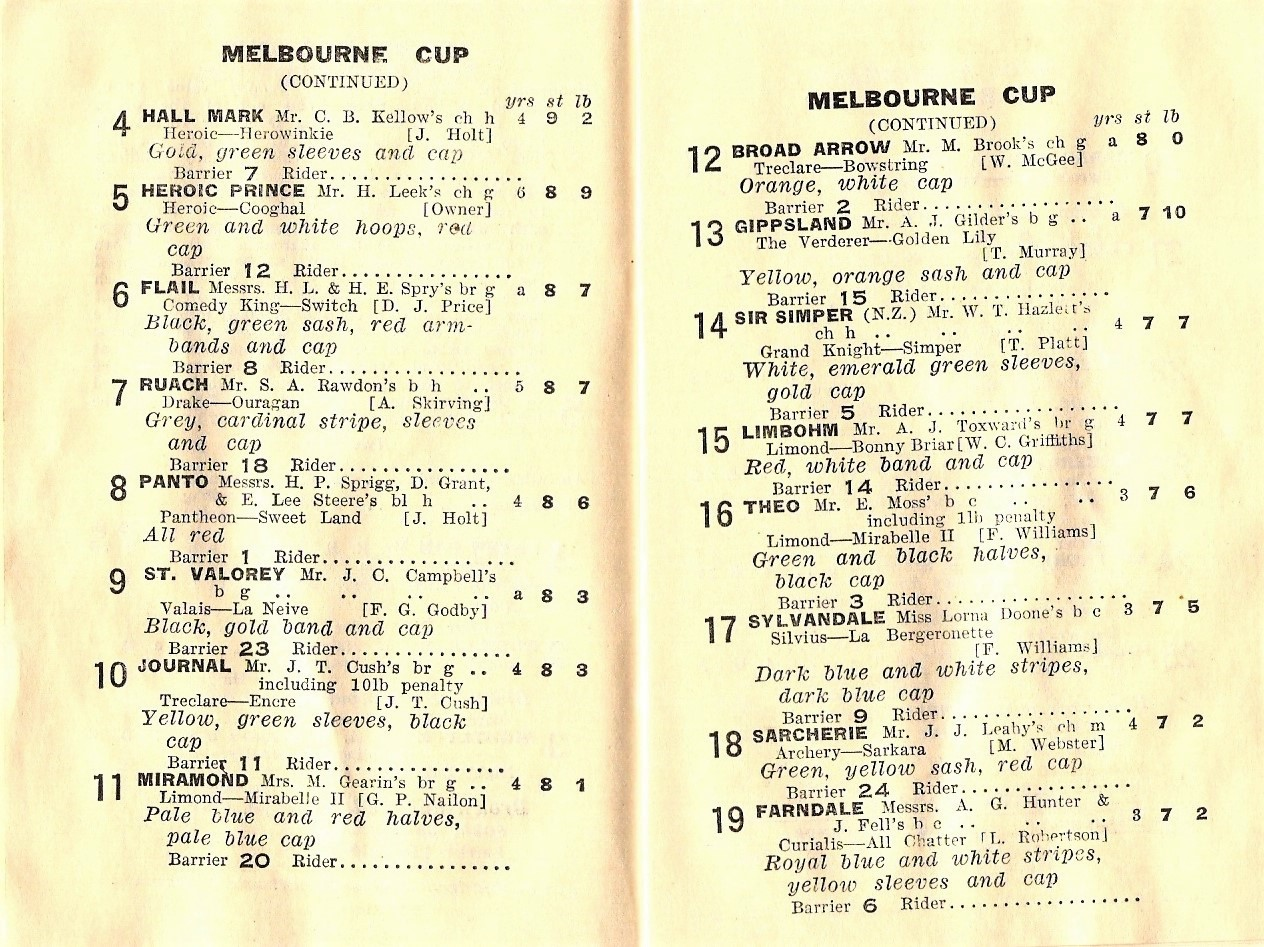
1934 VRC Melbourne Cup racebook

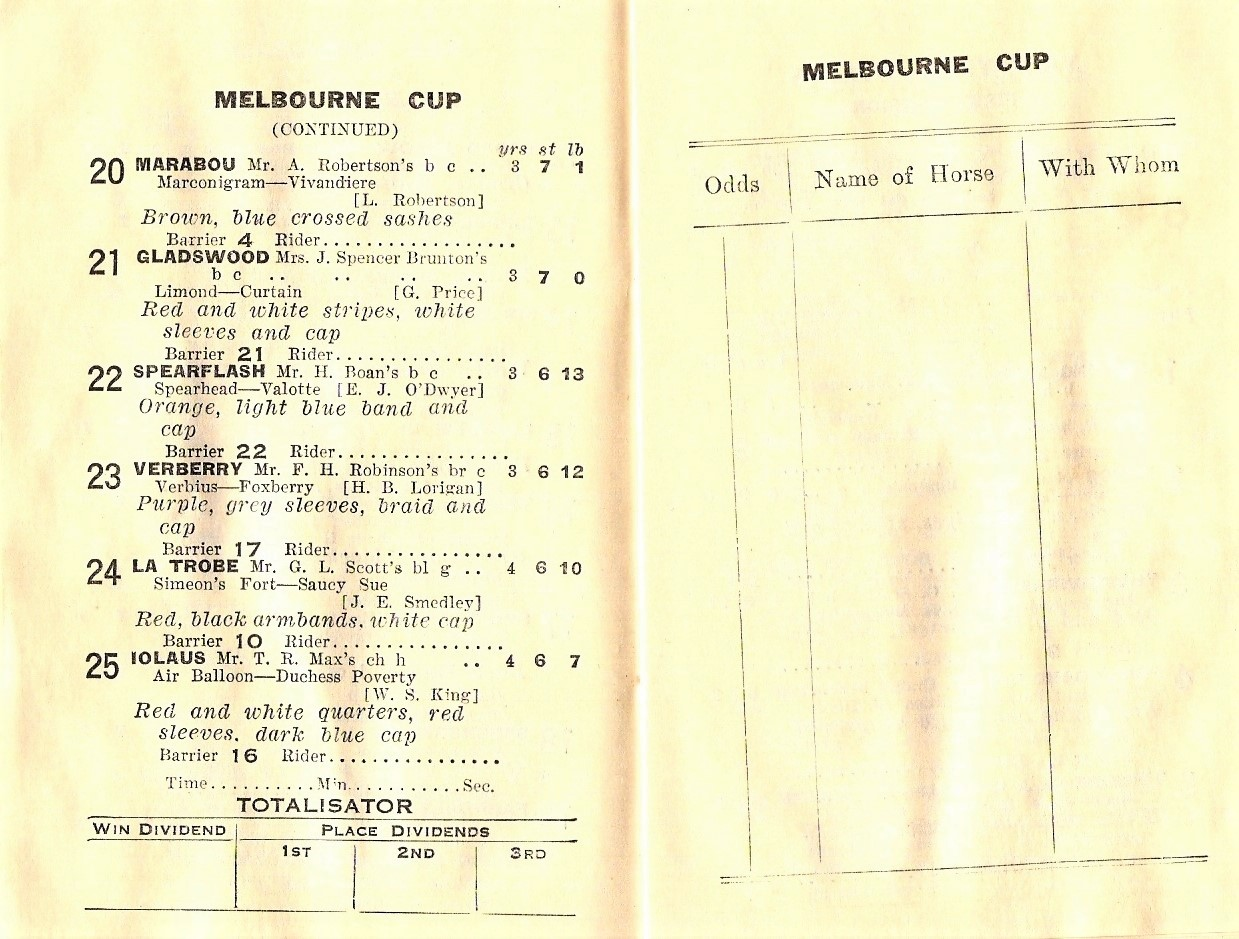
1934 VRC Melbourne Cup racebook

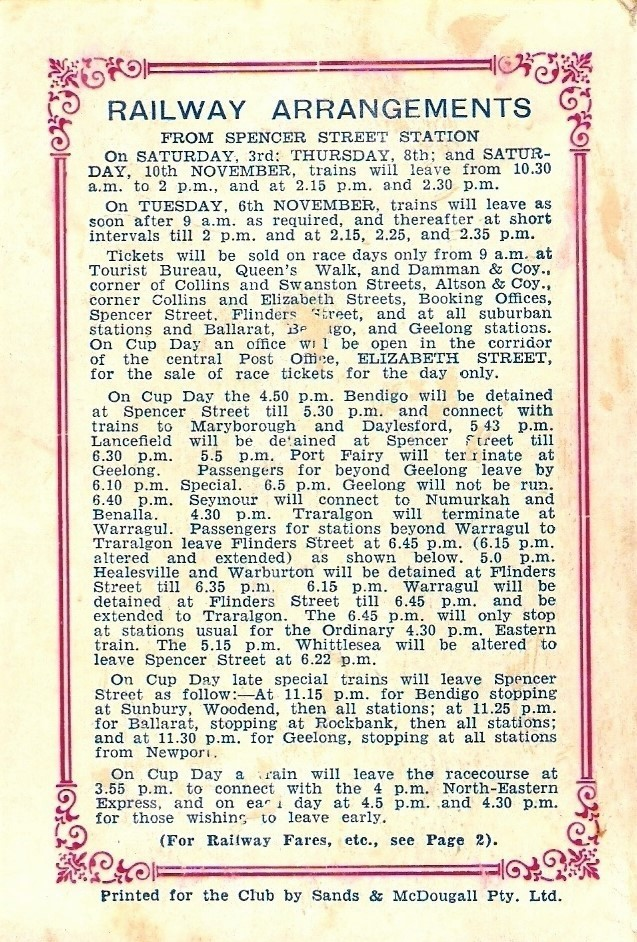
The back cover showing raceday railway arrangements

== See also ==
- Victoria Racing Club
- Australian horse-racing
- Melbourne Spring Racing Carnival
- List of Melbourne Cup placings
