= 1908 Melbourne Cup =

Edition of the Melbourne Cup

- Melbourne Cup
- Location: Flemington Racecourse
- Date: 3 Nov 1908
- Distance: 2 miles
- Winning horse: Lord Nolan
- Winning time: 3:28.75
- Final odds: 16/1
- Jockey: J. Flynn
- Trainer: E. Mayo
- Owner: J. Mayo
- Surface: Turf
- Attendance: 88,415

The 1908 Melbourne Cup was a two-mile hanicap horse race which took place on Tuesday, 3 November 1908.

The race saw a 22-horse field compete. Owner John Mayo won his second Melbourne Cup with Lord Nolan, who won in a tight finish by half a head. The horse was named after Louis Nolan from the Charge of the Light Brigade.

Lord Nolan was the three-quarter brother to 1903 Melbourne Cup winner Lord Cardigan. This is a list of placegetters for the 1908 Melbourne Cup.

Place	Name	Jockey	Trainer	Owner
1	Lord Nolan	J. Flynn	E. Mayo	J. Mayo
2	Tulkeroo	N. Godby	C. Wheeler	
3	Delaware	F. Harmer	H. W. Taylor	

== See also ==
- Melbourne Cup
- List of Melbourne Cup winners
- Victoria Racing Club
