= 1922 Melbourne Cup =

Edition of the Melbourne Cup

- Melbourne Cup
- Location: Flemington Racecourse
- Date: 7 Nov 1922
- Distance: 2 miles
- Winning horse: King Ingoda
- Winning time: 3:28.25
- Final odds: 8/1
- Jockey: A. Wilson
- Trainer: J. Scobie
- Surface: Turf
- Attendance: 115,000

The 1922 Melbourne Cup was a two-mile handicap horse race which took place on Tuesday, 7 November 1922.

A then record crowd of 115,000 watched a chaotic edition of the Melbourne Cup. The race had 32 starters, 13 of which were winners of major races, including 1921 race winner Sister Olive as well as the 1922 Caulfield Cup and VRC Derby winner Whittier. On race day The Cypher was backed from 12/1 to 6/1 favourite. With five furlongs left in the race, Stare fell and brought down Polynesian, while further on, Double Bezique broke a fetlock. The race was fought out with a neck-and-neck battle up the Flemington straight between The Cypher and the well-backed James Scobie trained King Ingoda who won the Hotham Handicap on Derby Day. King Ingoda edged out The Cypher for the win with Mufli finished two lengths back in third.

This is the list of placegetters for the 1922 Melbourne Cup.

Place	Name	Jockey	Trainer
1	King Ingoda	A. Wilson	J. Scobie
2	The Cypher	E. O'Sullivan	P. Guinane
3	Mufti	F. Straker	J. Mulcahy

== See also ==
- Melbourne Cup
- List of Melbourne Cup winners
- Victoria Racing Club
