= 1887 Melbourne Cup =

Annual horse race in Victoria, Australia

- Melbourne Cup
- Location: Flemington Racecourse
- Date: 1 November 1887
- Distance: 2 miles
- Winning horse: Dunlop
- Winning time: 3:28.50
- Final odds: 20/1
- Jockey: Thomas Sanders
- Trainer: John Nicholson
- Owner: Richard Donovan
- Conditions: Hard
- Surface: Turf
- Attendance: 83,000

The 1887 Melbourne Cup was a two-mile handicap horse race which took place on Tuesday, 1 November 1887.

This year was the twenty-seventh running of the Melbourne Cup. Won by five-year-old stallion Dunlop at odds of 20/1.

With the addition of £2,500 to the winner's sweepstakes, the race was now the richest race in Australia.

== Entries and odds ==
From an initial subscription of 128 runners, only 24 entries had paid the final fee to run in the Melbourne Cup. James White's runner Trident was the nominal top-weighted runner having won the Australian Cup in the autumn, but the horse would be withdrawn before the race following its run in the Melbourne Stakes, leaving Sardius carrying 8 st 5 lb (53.1 kg) at the top of the handicap list.

Algerian, The Australian Peer, Silver Prince, Oakleigh, and Remus had all been heavily backed in the lead-up to the race, but it would be seven-year-old horse Meteor that would assume overall favouritism at 5/1. Oakleigh had won the Caulfield Cup ahead of a disappointing Silvermine, with Remus in second. Silvermine though had improved by the start of the VRC Spring Meeting, defeating Dunlop to win the Melbourne Stakes. It was said that Silvermine was an "unlucky" horse and that it would more as soon finish high in the placegetters without winning.

It was said that Dunlop had improved over the spring racing season, but Algerian would have the better run of the two horses. Three-year-old colt The Australian Peer was strongly backed following its win in the Victoria Derby, where it beat Abercorn at even weights. A few weeks earlier, Abercorn had won the AJC Derby at Randwick Racecourse in a canter, where Niagara had also finished ahead of The Australian Peer. Niagara had suffered interference in the Victoria Derby when Tranter stumbled and bumped Niagara off its stride down the Flemington straight.

The Charmer was the only filly in the race, with many owners not electing to run mares in the arduous race. Previous Cup runners Silvermine, Meteor and Recall were again entered into the race. Recall was seen as one of the better outside chances to win the race, with odds wound in to 14/1 by the start of the race.

It was reported that Sardius was only entered in the race to win a wager for the owner that the horse would merely start the Melbourne Cup.

In a first for the race, no Victorian-bred runners remained in the field following final acceptances.

== The race ==
A small field of just 18 runners went to the starting post following a few withdrawals on race day. It was the fewest runners since the 1874 Melbourne Cup.

Silver Prince had the quickest start and was the leading runner at the first turn ahead of Algerian, The Charmer, Tranter, Remus, Thunderbolt, Pakeha, The Australian Peer and Recall. Along the riverside, Silver Prince maintained its advantage, increasing the pace, while Sardius brought up the rear of the field. Algerian joined Silver Prince in the lead, with Remus in third in front of The Charmer and a large pack about a mile from the winning post. Cranbrook made a run to take third, while the leading pair battled for the advantage. Silver Prince was close on the rails, and with half a mile to go Algerian had a slight lead with Cranbrook and Dunlop coming around the outside. At the final turn, Silver Prince and Algerian were still locked together, with Cranbrook and Dunlop still applying pressure.

Down the Flemington straight, the two leaders started to fade having run their race too soon. Dunlop took over the lead ahead of Silvermine, with The Australian Peer ahead of the chasing pack. Alec Robertson coaxed an effort out of Silvermine to draw close to Dunlop, but the Tasmanian-bred horse didn't have one more kick to take the lead. Jockey Thomas Sanders leading home Dunlop to win ahead of Silvermine by a length in the fastest Melbourne Cup time of 3:28.5. The Australian Peer finished strongly to take third, ahead of Niagara. Sardius had broken down and failed to finish. Bred in South Australia, Dunlop was trained by John Nicholson, the brother of jockey Donald Nicholson who had died in a race fall during the 1886 Caulfield Cup.

This would be the last Melbourne Cup race for jockey Alec Robertson. Winner of the 1884 Cup on Malua, Robertson had been third (1885) and second (1886) with Trenton. Robertson died following a fall on 2 January 1888. Silvermine was also killed in the same incident.

== Full results ==
This is the list of placegetters for the 1887 Melbourne Cup.

Place	Horse	Age Gender	Jockey	Weight	Trainer	Owner	Odds	Margin
1	Dunlop	5y h	Thomas Sanders	8 st 3 lb (52.2 kg)	John Nicholson	Richard Donovan	20/1	1 length
2	Silvermine	6y h	Alec Robertson (Note: Sometimes spelled Alick Robertson)	8 st 3 lb (52.2 kg)	Isaac Foulsham	William Cooper	14/1	1 length
3	The Australian Peer	3y c	Ted Gorry	7 st 5 lb (46.7 kg)	Harry Rayner	William Gannon	6/1	½ length
4	Niagara (NZL)	3y c	Trahan	7 st 5 lb (46.7 kg) (Note: Was supposed to carry 7st 3lb)	Isaac Foulsham	William Cooper	20/1	
5	Abercorn	3y c	Tom Hales	7 st 7 lb (47.6 kg)	Thomas Payten	James White	20/1	
6	Recall	5y h	Power	7 st 5 lb (46.7 kg)		Mr R. Orr	14/1	
7	Oakleigh	5y h	Fielder	7 st 4 lb (46.3 kg)		Martin Loughlin	7/1	
8	Algerian	5y h	T. Nerriker	7 st 1 lb (44.9 kg)		Mr G. Osborne	6/1	
9	Remus	5y h	Sam Cracknell	6 st 11 lb (43.1 kg)		Mr S.G. Cook	15/1	
10	Silver Prince (NZL)	4y h	Cochrane	7 st 3 lb (45.8 kg)		William Robinson	15/1	
11	Cranbrook	3y c	O'Keefe	6 st 12 lb (43.5 kg)	Thomas Payten	James White	20/1	
12	Thunderbolt (NZL)	5y h	M. Gallagher	7 st 8 lb (48.1 kg)		William Robinson	25/1	
13	Jebusite	3y c	Howie	6 st 6 lb (40.8 kg) (Note: Was supposed to carry 6st 3lb)		Mr J. Cohen	100/1	
14	Meteor	7y h	Fiddes	7 st 2 lb (45.4 kg)		Mr R.K. Maitland	5/1 fav.	
15	Tranter (NZL)	3y c	O'Connor	6 st 6 lb (40.8 kg)	William E. Dakin	Edwin Mitchelson	20/1	
16	Pakeha	3y c	O'Connor	6 st 6 lb (40.8 kg)	A. Davis	Mr A. Harvey	40/1	
17	The Charmer	3y f	O'Neil	6 st 10 lb (42.6 kg)		Mr S.G. Cook	50/1	
DNF	Sardius	7y h	Burton	8 st 5 lb (53.1 kg)		Mr S. Nathan	50/1	
SCR	Trident	4y h	—N/a	9 st 8 lb (60.8 kg)	Thomas Payten	James White		
SCR	Frisco	4y h	—N/a	7 st 3 lb (45.8 kg)		Mr T. Sampson		
SCR	Enfilade	3y c	—N/a	6 st 12 lb (43.5 kg)	Harry Yeend	William Robinson		
SCR	Affluence	5y h	—N/a	6 st 11 lb (43.1 kg)		Mr J. Pile		
SCR	Escutcheon (NZL)	3y c	—N/a	6 st 9 lb (42.2 kg)	William E. Dakin	Edwin Mitchelson		
SCR	Lord William	4y h	—N/a	7 st 7 lb (47.6 kg)		Mr C.R. Ord		

== Prizemoney ==
With the Victorian economy booming, the Victoria Racing Club increased the prize money awarded for a second year, adding £2500 to the winner's sweepstakes and including a trophy valued at £100. The trophy was a golden horseshoe mounted on a plush stand.

First prize £3155, second prize £500, third prize £250.

== See also ==
- Melbourne Cup
- List of Melbourne Cup winners
- Victoria Racing Club
