= 1906 Melbourne Cup =

Edition of the Melbourne Cup

- Melbourne Cup
- Location: Flemington Racecourse
- Date: 6 Nov 1906
- Distance: 2 miles
- Winning horse: Poseidon
- Winning time: 3:31.5
- Final odds: 4/1
- Jockey: Tom Clayton
- Trainer: Isaac Earnshaw
- Owner: Hugh Denison
- Surface: Turf
- Attendance: 82,388

The 1906 Melbourne Cup was a two-mile handicap horse race which took place on Tuesday, 6 November 1906.

This race saw a 21-horse field compete. Three year old Poseidon beat fellow three year old Antonius by three lengths to cap off a magical run as earlier in the spring he had won Australian Derby, Eclipse Stakes, Caulfield Cup and Victoria Derby. Jimmy Ah Poon was growing vegetables near Canterbury Park Racecourse and supplied them to trainer Ike Earnshaw and through that became friends with Poseidon. Starting in September he began betting on Poseidon. The only time he did not back the colt was in The Metropolitan where he was beaten. Ah Poon had turned his original stakes of £10 to £35,500.

This is the list of placegetters for the 1906 Melbourne Cup.

Place	Name	Jockey	Trainer	Owner
1	Poseidon	Tom Clayton	Isaac Earnshaw	Hugh Denison
2	Antonius	E. Turner	J. Suna	
3	Proceed	W. McLachlan	J. Brown	

== See also ==
- Melbourne Cup
- List of Melbourne Cup winners
- Victoria Racing Club
