= 1901 Melbourne Cup =

Annual horse race in Victoria, Australia

- Melbourne Cup
- Location: Flemington Racecourse
- Date: 5 November 1901
- Distance: 2 miles
- Winning horse: Revenue
- Winning time: 3:30.50
- Final odds: 7/4
- Jockey: F Dunn
- Trainer: Hugh Munro
- Owner: C. Leslie Macdonald
- Surface: Turf
- Attendance: 95,000

The 1901 Melbourne Cup was a two-mile handicap horse race which took place on Tuesday, 5 November 1901.

This year was the forty-first running of the Melbourne Cup.

This is the list of placegetters for the 1901 Melbourne Cup.

Place	Name	Jockey	Trainer	Owner
1	Revenue	F Dunn	Hugh Munro	C. Leslie Macdonald
2	San Fran	F. Kuhn	T. Payten	
3	Khaki	P. Houseman	W. Duggan	
4	Haymaker	P King		
5	Wakeful	S Anwin		

== See also ==
- Melbourne Cup
- List of Melbourne Cup winners
- Victoria Racing Club
