= 1905 Melbourne Cup =

Edition of the Melbourne Cup

- Melbourne Cup
- Location: Flemington Racecourse
- Date: 7 Nov 1905
- Distance: 2 miles
- Winning horse: Blue Spec
- Winning time: 3:27.5
- Final odds: 10/1
- Jockey: F. Bullock
- Trainer: Walter Hickenbottom
- Surface: Turf

The 1905 Melbourne Cup was a two-mile handicap horse race which took place on Tuesday, 7 November 1905.

This race saw a 26-horse field compete. Jockey Frank Bullock had returned to Australia three weeks earlier and has not intended to ride in the race. He got a ride on Blue Spec after Normon Godby who had ridden Blue Spec to victory in Moonee Valley Cup choose to ride Gladsome. Blue Spec had previously won the Kalgoorlie Cup and Perth Cup and triumphed for owner Paddy Connolly in a race record time of 3 minutes 27.5 seconds.

This is the list of placegetters for the 1905 Melbourne Cup.

Place	Name	Jockey	Trainer
1	Blue Spec	F. Bullock	Walter Hickenbotham
2	Scot Free	H. Coffey	Tom Payten
3	Tartan	J. Barden	Joe Burton

== See also ==
- Melbourne Cup
- List of Melbourne Cup winners
- Victoria Racing Club
