= 1892 Melbourne Cup =

Annual horse race in Victoria, Australia

- Melbourne Cup
- Location: Flemington Racecourse
- Date: 1 November 1892
- Distance: 2 miles
- Winning horse: Glenloth
- Winning time: 3:36.25
- Final odds: 50/1
- Jockey: G. Robson
- Trainer: M. Carmody
- Owner: M. Carmody
- Surface: Turf
- Attendance: 67,000

The 1892 Melbourne Cup was a two-mile handicap horse race which took place on Tuesday, 1 November 1892.

This year was the thirty-second running of the Melbourne Cup.

This is the list of placegetters for the 1892 Melbourne Cup.

Place	Name	Jockey	Trainer	Owner
1	Glenloth	G. Robson	M. Carmody	M. Carmody
2	Ronda	James Gough		
3	Penance	J. Hatch	W T Jones	

== See also ==
- Melbourne Cup
- List of Melbourne Cup winners
- Victoria Racing Club
