= 1925 Melbourne Cup =

Edition of the Melbourne Cup

- Melbourne Cup
- Location: Flemington Racecourse
- Date: 3 Nov 1925
- Distance: 2 miles
- Winning horse: Windbag
- Winning time: 3:22:75
- Final odds: 5/1
- Jockey: Jimmie Munro
- Trainer: George Richard Price
- Owner: Robert Miller
- Surface: Turf
- Attendance: 150,000

The 1925 Melbourne Cup was a two-mile handicap horse race which took place on Tuesday, 3 November 1925 at Melbourne's Flemington Racecourse.

This was the 65th edition of the race and the first Melbourne Cup to be broadcast to the public. The Australian Broadcasting Company (ABC) provided the transmission.

This race was won Windbag, trained by George Richard Price and ridden by Jimmie Munro. The win set a new race record time of 3 minutes 22.75 seconds. He secured victory by half a length ahead of the favourite Manfred. Manfred was leading most of the race with Windbag tailing behind until the last 100 metres. The Melbourne Stakes winner Pilliewinkle finished third, a full length behind Manfred.

== Field ==
This is the list of placegetters for the 1925 Melbourne Cup.

Place	Name	Jockey	Trainer
1st	Windbag	Jimmie Munro	George Richard Price
2nd	Manfred	Frank Dempsey	Harry McCalman
3rd	Pilliewinkie	Grant Young	R. W. King

This is the finishing order for the remaining horses

Place	Name
4th	Tookarby
5th	Gungool
6th	The Slave
7th	Royal Charter
8th	Valamita
9th	Mirthmaker
10th	Bard of Avon
11th	Our Prince
12th	Belgamba
13th	Stralia
14th	Frances Tressady
15th	Accarak
16th	Raith
17th	Stand By
18th	Solidify
	Spearfelt
Virgin Gold
Lemina
Susie Pye
Baldwin
Royal Roue
25th	Friarsdale
26th	Wallarak
27th	King's Pardon
29th	Pukka
SCR	~~Brown Rajah~~

== See also ==
- Melbourne Cup
- List of Melbourne Cup winners
- Victoria Racing Club
