= 1893 Melbourne Cup =

Annual horse race in Victoria, Australia

- Melbourne Cup
- Location: Flemington Racecourse
- Date: 7 November 1893
- Distance: 2 miles
- Winning horse: Tarcoola
- Winning time: 3:30.50
- Final odds: 40/1
- Jockey: Herbert Cripps
- Trainer: Joseph Cripps
- Owner: J. D. Lewis
- Surface: Turf
- Attendance: 67,000

The 1893 Melbourne Cup was a two-mile handicap horse race which took place on Tuesday, 7 November 1893.

This year was the thirty-third running of the Melbourne Cup.

This is the list of placegetters for the 1893 Melbourne Cup.

Place	Name	Jockey	Trainer	Owner
1	Tarcoola	Herbert Cripps	Joseph Cripps	J. D. Lewis
2	Carnage	H. Morn	C L McDonald	
3	Jeweller	W. Delaney	I Earnshaw	

== See also ==
- Melbourne Cup
- List of Melbourne Cup winners
- Victoria Racing Club
