= 1910 Melbourne Cup =

Edition of the Melbourne Cup

- Melbourne Cup
- Location: Flemington Racecourse
- Date: 1 Nov 1910
- Distance: 2 miles
- Winning horse: Comedy King
- Winning time: 3:27.75
- Final odds: 10/1
- Jockey: William McLachlan
- Trainer: James Lynch
- Surface: Turf

The 1910 Melbourne Cup was a two-mile handicap horse race which took place on Tuesday, 1 November 1910.

It was the 50th running of the race, and featured the only silver cup ever presented, which is now in the National Sports Museum. The race was won by Comedy King. He and his mother, Tragedy Queen, were imported to Australia in 1908 by Sol Green. Comedy King was sired by Persimmon, the Epsom Derby winner, which was owned by King Edward VII. Comedy King, which did not race as a two-year-old, won the Futurity Stakes at its second start, before being aimed at 1910 Melbourne Cup

In his last start before the 1910 Cup, he won the Spring Stakes at Randwick on 1 October, starting at 10/1. He defeated Trafalgar, which won 23 races in Australia but, in eight attempts, never beat Comedy King. For the second consecutive year, the winning jockey was William McLachlan, who won the 1909 race aboard Prince Foote. Comedy King went on to sire 1919 Melbourne Cup winner Artillerymen, and the 1922 Melbourne Cup winner King Ingoda, as well as Shadow King, which was placed four times in the race from 1930 to 1933.

This is the list of place-getters in the 1910 Melbourne Cup.

Place	Name	Jockey	Trainer
1	Comedy King	William McLachlan	James Lynch
2	Trafalgar	R. Cameron	Walter Hickenbottom
3	Apple Pie	P. Foley	T. Payten

== See also ==
- Melbourne Cup
- List of Melbourne Cup winners
- Victoria Racing Club
