= Stanley Reid =

Australian cricketer (born 1955)

Personal information
- Born: 5 May 1955 (age 71); St Helens, Tasmania, Australia

Domestic team information
- Years: Team
- 1981-1983: Tasmania
- Source: Cricinfo, 15 March 2016

Stanley Reid (born 5 May 1955) is an Australian former cricketer. He played eleven first-class matches for Tasmania between 1981 and 1983.

== See also ==
- List of Tasmanian representative cricketers
