= 1903 Melbourne Cup =

Annual horse race in Victoria, Australia

- Melbourne Cup
- Location: Flemington Racecourse
- Date: 3 November 1903
- Distance: 2 miles
- Winning horse: Lord Cardigan
- Winning time: 3:29.25
- Final odds: 5/1
- Jockey: Norman Godby
- Trainer: A E Cornwell
- Owner: J Mayo
- Surface: Turf
- Attendance: 95,000

The 1903 Melbourne Cup was a two-mile handicap horse race which took place on Tuesday, 3 November 1903.

Lord Cardigan died from the effects of the race a few days after his run in the 1904 Melbourne Cup where he ran second.

This year was the forty-third running of the Melbourne Cup.

This is the list of placegetters for the 1903 Melbourne Cup.

| Place | Name | Jockey | Trainer | Owner |
|---|---|---|---|---|
| 1 | Lord Cardigan | N Godby | A E Cornwell | J. Mayo |
| 2 | Wakeful | F Dunn | Hugh Munro | |
| 3 | Seaport | W Bennett | M J Carmody | |

== See also ==
- Melbourne Cup
- List of Melbourne Cup winners
- Victoria Racing Club
