= 1874 Melbourne Cup =

Annual horse race in Melbourne, Victoria

- Melbourne Cup
- Location: Flemington Racecourse
- Date: 5 November 1874
- Distance: 2 miles
- Winning horse: Haricot
- Winning time: 3:37.5
- Final odds: 16/1
- Jockey: Paddy Piggott
- Trainer: Sam Harding
- Owner: Andrew Chirnside
- Surface: Turf
- Attendance: 75,000

The 1874 Melbourne Cup was a two-mile handicap horse race which took place on Thursday, 5 November 1874.

This year was the fourteenth running of the Melbourne Cup.

Wild weather threatened in the lead-up to the race, with 21 runners paying the final acceptance fees. There had been 79 runners initially enter into the race in June. Break of Day was expected to do well should the ground remain soft or wet, while Goldsborough and The Diver were not expected to do well in those conditions. Previous year's winning trainer James Wilson had two runners, with King of the Ring expected to be the better horse. With a light weight, Haricot was expected to feature during the race, but was not fancied by many judges at the two-mile distance. Despite the threatened conditions, John Tait's Goldsborough started a short-priced favourite. William Wilson, younger son of trainer James Wilson, was chosen to ride King of the Ring, a year after winning the race on board Don Juan.

Four horses were scratched before the race day began — Papapa, Blue Peter, Menindie, and The Hook. After morning showers, the weather turned perfect for the day of the race, with 18 runners starting the race. Goldsborough and King of the Ring were the favoured runners. Haricot, bred in Victoria by Andrew Chirnside at Werribee bolted clear of the field to win the Cup.

Haricot was near the lead from almost the start, getting in front of the field just beyond the first turn, increasing its lead to about 20 lengths down the back straight. The Diver and Protos went off in pursuit before the final turn to try to cut the advantage built up by Haricot, eventually Protos finished four lengths behind the winner, with The Diver third. The win surprised many at the racecourse, as it was supposed that Haricot could not sustain the pace set for the entire two miles. Haricot had previously won a race in Warrnambool as a three-year-old, and won the 1874 Ballarat Handicap. The horse had placed second in the Melbourne Stakes behind Dagworth in the lead up to the Melbourne Cup.

Haricot's margin of victory was the largest winning margin in the race since Archer's consecutive wins.

It was estimated that 75,000 people attended the racecourse — at the time the largest attendance for the Melbourne Cup. The Victoria Racing Club collected £6000 in revenue from the race meeting.

== Full results ==
This is the list of placegetters for the 1874 Melbourne Cup.

Place	Horse	Age Gender	Jockey	Weight	Trainer	Owner	Odds	Margin
1	Haricot	4y g	Paddy Piggott	6 st 7 lb (41.3 kg)	Sam Harding	Andrew Chirnside	16/1	4 lengths
2	Protos	7y g	G. Arthur	8 st 9 lb (54.9 kg)	James Wilson	James Wilson	20/1	Neck
3	The Diver (late Dolphin)	4y h	Greville	6 st 10 lb (42.6 kg)	William E. Dakin	Mr C. Dublin (Note: An assumed alias of Charles Madden Lloyd)	6/1	
4	King of the Ring	5y h	William Wilson	8 st 7 lb (54.0 kg)	James Wilson	James Wilson	5/1	
5	Break of Day	5y h	J. Ryan	6 st 5 lb (40.4 kg)		John Coldham	7/1	
6	King Tom	5y h	Samuel Davis	7 st 0 lb (44.5 kg)		Mr P. Lewis	20/1	
7	Goldsborough	4y h	Jimmy Ashworth	7 st 2 lb (45.4 kg)	John Tait	John Tait	2/1 fav.	
8	Fitz-Yattendon	4y h	M. Thompson	7 st 10 lb (49.0 kg)		Hercules Robinson	10/1	
9	The Arrow	5y h	H. Grubb	8 st 0 lb (50.8 kg)	John Tait	John Tait	10/1	
10	After Dark (late Wait-A-Bit)	Aged g	Watson	7 st 8 lb (48.1 kg) (Note: Was supposed to carry 7st 7lb)		Mr J. Brewer	50/1	
11	Dagworth	6y h	George Donnelly	10 st 0 lb (63.5 kg)	Etienne de Mestre	Etienne de Mestre	16/1	
12	Lapidist	4y h	Johnny Day	7 st 11 lb (49.4 kg)	William Filgate	William Filgate	20/1	
13	Lurline (NZL)	5y m	R. Mason	8 st 11 lb (55.8 kg)		Mr J. Watt	10/1	
—N/a	Speculation	4y h	Duggan	7 st 6 lb (47.2 kg)		Hercules Robinson	20/1	
—N/a	Goshawk	4y h	Musgrave	7 st 4 lb (46.3 kg)		Mr S.P. Winter	50/1	
—N/a	Gloom	4y g	J. Nolan	8 st 6 lb (53.5 kg)	William Filgate	William Filgate	20/1	
—N/a	Kettledrum	4y h	Cleary	6 st 4 lb (39.9 kg)		Frank Leng	50/1	
—N/a	Cleolite	4y m	Scrivener	5 st 12 lb (37.2 kg)		Mr A. Williamson	20/1	
SCR	Blue Peter	5y h	—N/a	7 st 7 lb (47.6 kg)		Mr J. Brewer	—N/a	
SCR	Mountaineer	4y g	—N/a	7 st 5 lb (46.7 kg)		Mr H.J. Bowler	—N/a	
SCR	Friendless	5y h	—N/a	7 st 0 lb (44.5 kg)		Mr J. Iliffe	—N/a	

== Prizemoney ==
First prize £1140, second prize £50, third prize £20.

== See also ==
- Melbourne Cup
- List of Melbourne Cup winners
- Victoria Racing Club
