= Sister Olive =

Australian-bred Thoroughbred racehorse

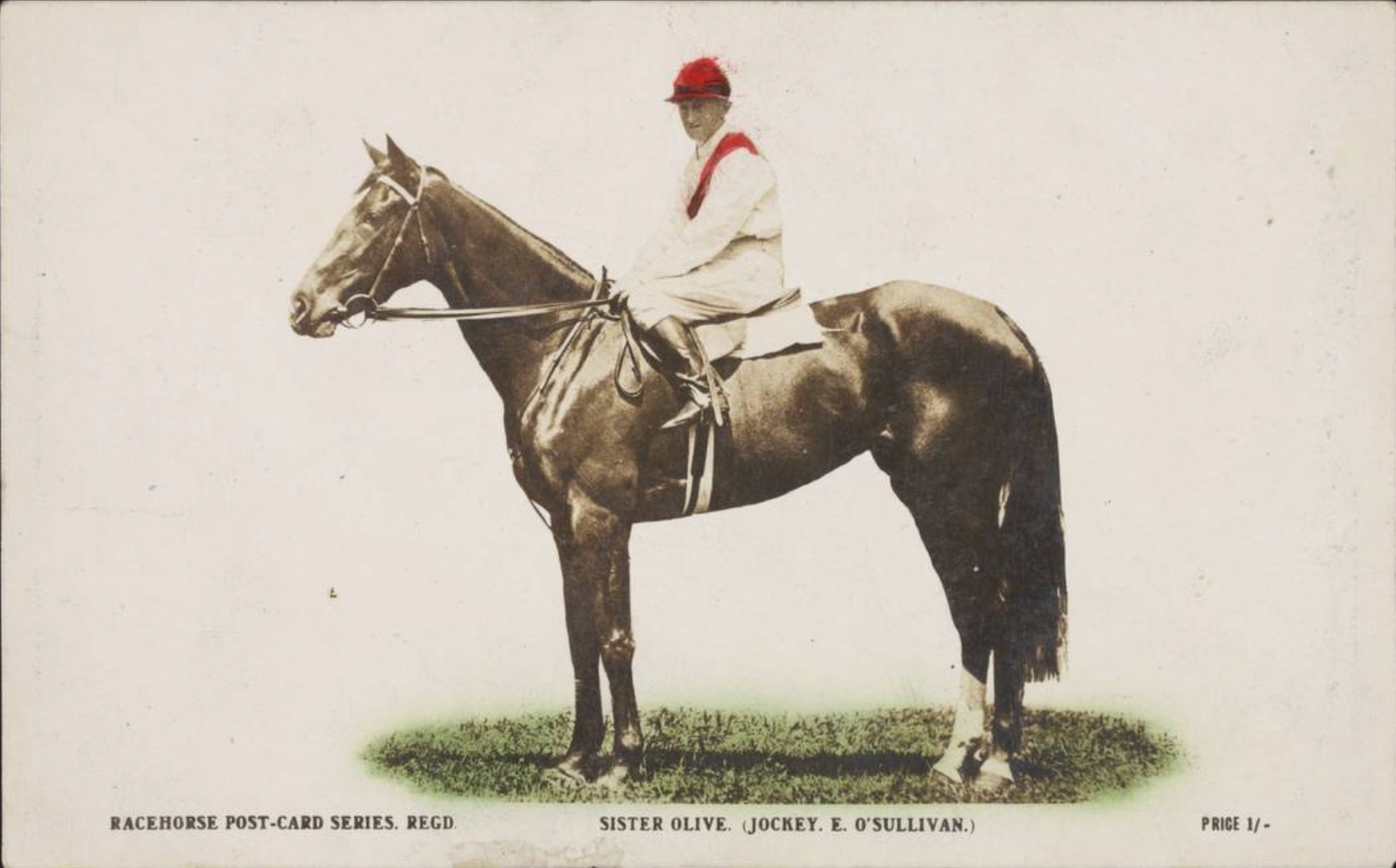
- Sister Olive, 1921 Melbourne Cup winner
- Sire: Red Dennis
- Grandsire: Tredennis
- Dam: Jubilee Queen (GB)
- Damsire: Positano (GB)
- Sex: Mare
- Foaled: 1918
- Died: 1945
- Country: Australia
- Colour: chestnut
- Breeder: Fred Norman
- Owner: Fred Norman
- Trainer: J Williams
- Record: 37: 2-6-8

Major wins
- Melbourne Cup (1921)

Sister Olive (1918−1945) was an Australian racehorse that won the 1921 Melbourne Cup.

== Racing career ==
After finishing 4th in the 1921 Caulfield Cup, Sister Olive won the Melbourne Cup as a three-year-old in the same year, with a three length margin. Her win was only the third and, as of August 2021, the most recent by a three-year-old filly. Starting at odds of 16/1 and carrying 6 st. 9 lbs. (42.18 kg) she beat a field of 25, including Eurythmic, the favourite that finished last. Before the race, jockey Ted O'Sullivan considered her a "a good thing". It was his first and only Melbourne Cup win.

She came second in the 1922 VRC Australian Cup.

== Stud career ==
Sister Olive was the dam of Manolive, winner of the C F Orr Stakes and the Perth Cup and Mount of Olives, that won the South Australian Derby.

== Pedigree ==
Pedigree of Sister Olive
Sire Red Dennis (IRE)	Tredennis (GB)	Kendal	Bend Or
Sire Red Dennis (IRE)	Tredennis (GB)	Kendal	Windermere
Sire Red Dennis (IRE)	Tredennis (GB)	St Marguerite	Hermit
Sire Red Dennis (IRE)	Tredennis (GB)	St Marguerite	Devotion
Sire Red Dennis (IRE)	Rosey Head (IRE)	Brayhead (GB)	Akrlow
Sire Red Dennis (IRE)	Rosey Head (IRE)	Brayhead (GB)	Contour
Sire Red Dennis (IRE)	Rosey Head (IRE)	Balrose (GB)	Maxim
Sire Red Dennis (IRE)	Rosey Head (IRE)	Balrose (GB)	Scampavia
Dam Jubilee Queen (AUS)	Positano (GB)	St. Simon	Galopin
Dam Jubilee Queen (AUS)	Positano (GB)	St. Simon	St. Angela
Dam Jubilee Queen (AUS)	Positano (GB)	Ponza	Springfield
Dam Jubilee Queen (AUS)	Positano (GB)	Ponza	Napoli
Dam Jubilee Queen (AUS)	Tragedy Queen (IRE)	Gallinule (GB)	Isonomy
Dam Jubilee Queen (AUS)	Tragedy Queen (IRE)	Gallinule (GB)	Moorhen
Dam Jubilee Queen (AUS)	Tragedy Queen (IRE)	Clarion	Ben Battle (GB)
Dam Jubilee Queen (AUS)	Tragedy Queen (IRE)	Clarion	Black Witch
