= Isaac Earnshaw =

Isaac Earnshaw (20 October 1859 – 1 May 1914) was an Australian trainer and owner of thoroughbred racehorses.

== History ==
Isaac Earnshaw was the eldest son of John Earnshaw (c. 1834 – 28 October 1907) and Charlotte Rebecca Earnshaw, née Hurlston (c. 1834 – 20 September 1904), of Pyrmont, New South Wales. He began his career with horses as a stable boy at "Orville", the stables of W. Kelso, before he eventually become head man there. He next worked as a trainer at Kogarah. He succeeded F. W. Day (died 1919) as trainer at Samuel Hordern's stables at Botany Street, Randwick in 1893, then when Hordern retired from racing in 1898 resumed business as a public trainer at Randwick. Among his patrons were J. Brown, W. Brown, H. R. Denison, W. and F. A. Moses, W. Brunton, R. C. Allen C. J. Britten, P. H. Morton, A. Hooke, and K. S. McLeod. Among winners he trained were:

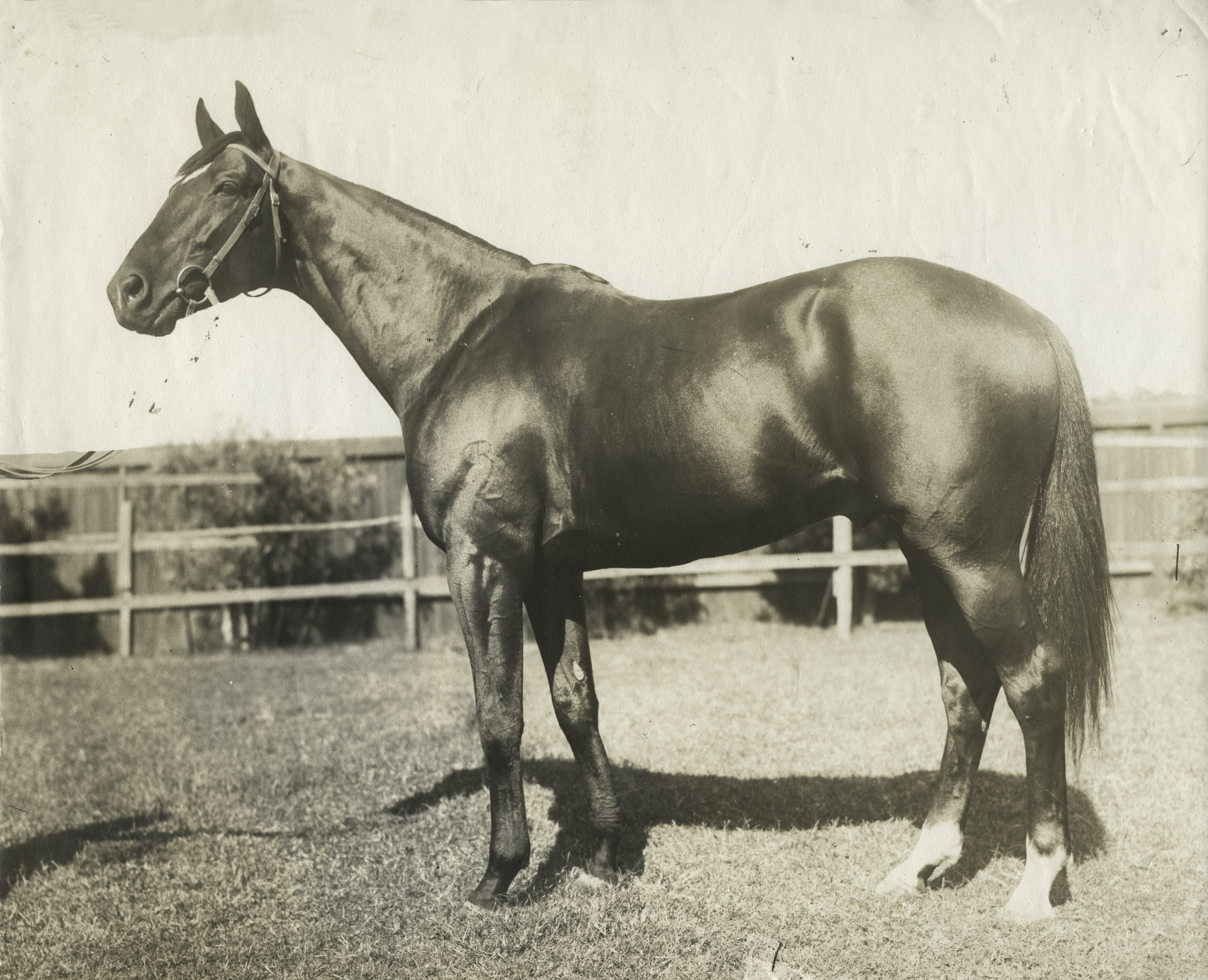
Poseidon, 1906 Melbourne Cup winner

New South Wales

- AJC All Aged Stakes: Bobrikoff (1910)
- AJC Derby: Poseidon (1900); Parsee (1908); Prince Foote (1909)
- AJC Autumn Stakes: Bobrikoff (1910)
- AJC Breeders' Plate: Zilka (1908)
- AJC Carrington Stakes: Heiro (1907)
- AJC Champagne Stakes: Haulette (1900); Posadas (1911); Woorak (1914)
- AJC Clibborn Stakes: Jacamar (1911)
- AJC Craven Plate: Parsee (1910)
- AJC December Stakes: Chantress (1901); Woorak (1913)
- AJC Doncaster Handicap: Sir Foote (1902)
- AJC Plate: Poseidon (1908)
- AJC St Leger: Poseidon (1907); Jacamar (1912)
- AJC Sires' Produce Stakes The Owl (1907); Radnor (1913); Imshi (1914)
- AJC The Metropolitan: The Skipper (1896)
- RRC Rosehill Cup: Moorilla (1913)
- AJC Spring Stakes: Poseidon (1907)
- AJC Summer Cup: Bridegroom (1903)
- AJC Sydney Cup: Moorilla (1911)
- Tattersall's Cup: Byplay (1911)

Victoria

- VRC Ascot Vale Stakes: Woorak (1914)
- VRC All-Aged Stakes: Chantress (1903); Antonio (1908); Parsee (1909)
- VATC Caulfield Cup: Poseidon (1906, 1907)
- VATC Caulfield Guineas: Parsee (1908)
- VATC Caulfield Futurity Stakes: Sir Foote (1902); Antonio (1908)
- VATC Eclipse Stakes: Poseidon (1906, 1907)
- VRC Melbourne Cup: Poseidon (1906); Apologue (1907)
- VRC Melbourne Stakes: Poseidon (1907)
- MVRC Moonee Valley Cup: Mirella (1897)
- VRC Newmarket Handicap: Sir Foote (1902); Chantress (1903)
- VATC Oakleigh Plate: Stand Off (1899)
- VRC Oaks: Haulette (1900); Beanba (1901)
- VRC St Leger: Poseidon (1907)
- VRC Derby: Poseidon (1906)

Other winners he trained were: Apologue; Jeweller; Barbarossa; The Skipper, Jacamar, Superb and Imshi. When Clark & Robinson moved to England, he served as their racing manager, and on his death replaced by C. Leslie Macdonald.

He was known for his knowledge of breeding, his correctness, as a stickler for punctuality, and for his secretive nature. He was a "silent worker"— very few people knew what his horses were likely to do.

He was remarkably successful in treating crippled horses, notably Antonio and Sir Foote. He could be relied on for a candid assessment of a horse's health, potential and peculiarities, his assessment was as good as any "vet"'s. He was a "hands on" trainer, not one who wore kid gloves and tanned boots and took the credit for the work of subordinates.

Despite being a non-smoker and teetotaller he did not enjoy good health, and died aged 53 following a successful hernia operation.

== Family ==
Isaac Earnshaw (20 October 1859 – 1 May 1914) married Annie (c. 1868 – 10 August 1944). They had three children:

- Arthur H. Earnshaw
- John Earnshaw
- Florence Earnshaw married R. S. Donald

His brothers were Arthur, John, and Joseph Henry Earnshaw. His sister Charlotte Hessel Earnshaw married John Sherlock, B. A. on 20 December 1899.
