= 1878 Melbourne Cup =

Annual horse race in Melbourne, Victoria

- Melbourne Cup
- Location: Flemington Racecourse
- Date: 5 November 1878
- Distance: 2 miles
- Winning horse: Calamia
- Winning time: 3:35.75
- Final odds: 10/1
- Jockey: Thomas Brown
- Trainer: Etienne de Mestre
- Owner: Etienne de Mestre
- Surface: Turf
- Attendance: ≈80,000

The 1878 Melbourne Cup was a two-mile handicap horse race which took place on Tuesday, 5 November 1878.

This year was the eighteenth running of the Melbourne Cup. Won by five-year-old Calamia, it was the fifth time a horse trained by Etienne de Mestre had won the Melbourne Cup.

1877 cup winner Chester fell and collided with a post during the race. Chester's veteran jockey Joe Morrison was seriously injured in the fall, suffering a badly broken leg, an injury from which he never really recovered.

== Entries and odds ==
Highly fancied runner First King had suffered an injury prior to the race and had to be withdrawn by James Wilson ahead of the day of the race, while previous year's winner Chester had shown good form again in the lead-up, winning the Melbourne Stakes on the Saturday before the Melbourne Cup, easily beating both Cap-a-pie and Device. Savanaka, who had come second the previous year was not well-backed by its stable a year later, eventually being withdrawn from the race on the day. Columbus had been heavily backed following the Victoria Derby which was won by Wellington. But the most backed runner was Wilson's Melita, taking favouritism ahead of Wellington and Firebell. Many believed that Chester would be able to repeat its win from the year before.

== The race ==
Cup Day dawned under grey skies, but brightened as the morning progressed, and by the time the race was run the weather had turned to pleasant sunshine, albeit with a cool wind. Following a number of withdrawals, 30 runners were sent to the start. Rapidity jumped clear after the flag fell, leading the field for more than the first mile of the race, Tom Kirk the only runner to match the speed of the leader. When Chester fell rounding a post, its jockey Joe Morrison was badly injured. The fall caused Glengarry to bolt inside the course. Wellington and Fireball looked in good position as the field tried to catch Rapidity, but it was Calamia that lead from beyond the final turn to ease home win by more than two lengths. Tom Kirk and Waxy finished in the minor placings, while the favourite Melita was never really in the race, having been run wide around much of the course.

For jockey Thomas Brown it was his first win in the Melbourne Cup. He would return as a trainer to win the race in 1880 with Grand Flaneur. The fifth win in the race for Etienne de Mestre confirmed his standing as Australia's first outstanding racehorse trainer, and his stables at Terrara near Nowra to be the finest in the country. In typical style, de Mestre had backed his other runner Firebell to win the race, despite expressing confidence in Calamia.

As a three-year-old, Calamia had previously won the Randwick Plate over three miles, as well as the Canterbury Plate. In other races, Calamia finished second in the VRC Champion Stakes and the Australian Cup. It was unplaced in a number of races earlier in 1878, having not raced since the autumn race meetings in Sydney.

Attendances at the racecourse were estimated to be at a similar level to the previous years, with thousands of visitors from the other colonies making their way to Melbourne. Reporters questioned whether the VRC would need to extend the grandstands before the next running of the Melbourne Cup as "for every additional mile of railway that is constructed to connect the country districts with Melbourne an increase in the number of visitors at carnival times may be expected."

== Full results ==
This is the list of placegetters for the 1878 Melbourne Cup.

Place	Horse	Age Gender	Jockey	Weight	Trainer	Owner	Odds	Margin
1	Calamia	5y h	Thomas Brown	8 st 2 lb (51.7 kg)	Etienne de Mestre	Etienne de Mestre	10/1	2½ lengths
2	Tom Kirk	7y h	William Murphy	7 st 8 lb (48.1 kg)	Ike Carslake	Mr C. James (Note: Alias of Friedrich Wilhelm Prell, a Melbourne businessman.)	33/1	1¼ lengths
3	Waxy	6y h	Braithwaite	6 st 11 lb (43.1 kg)	Ike Carslake	James Liddell Purves	16/1	
4	Swiveller	4y h	William Yeomans	7 st 13 lb (50.3 kg)	Walter Hickenbotham	Charles Madden Lloyd	25/1	
5	Wellington	3y c	J. King	5 st 13 lb (37.6 kg) (Note: Was supposed to carry 5st 11lb)		Edward Alfred Johnson-Boe	8/1	
6	Strathearn	4y h	C. Gordon	7 st 12 lb (49.9 kg)	John Tait	John Tait	33/1	
7	Newminster	5y h	Brickwood Colley	8 st 8 lb (54.4 kg)		Andrew Chirnside	25/1	
8	Glenormiston	4y h	George Williams	7 st 12 lb (49.9 kg)	William Filgate	William Filgate	25/1	
9	K.C.B.	3y c	Emsworth	5 st 10 lb (36.3 kg)	John Tait	John Tait	50/1	
10	Warlock	3y c	R. Walker	6 st 7 lb (41.3 kg)		Mr J. Paterson	33/1	
11	Lockleys	4y h	John Kilduff (Note: Also known as Jack Kilduff)	8 st 5 lb (53.1 kg)	Tom Jordan	Tom Jordan	33/1	
12	Riverton	3y c	C. Hutchins	5 st 12 lb (37.2 kg)		John Whittingham	50/1	
—N/a	Cap-a-pie	4y h	W. Huxley	8 st 8 lb (54.4 kg)		Mr G. Hill	20/1	
—N/a	Macaroni	6y g	Paddy Pigott	8 st 6 lb (53.5 kg)		Thomas Ivory	20/1	
—N/a	Rapidity	4y h	Weston	7 st 5 lb (46.7 kg)		Mr W. Brown	33/1	
—N/a	Burwood	8y g	Samuel Davis	7 st 4 lb (46.3 kg)		Mr S. Bradbury	50/1	
—N/a	Columbus	6y h	T. Aspinall	7 st 3 lb (45.8 kg)		Edward Alfred Johnson-Boe	16/1	
—N/a	Devilshoof	4y h	Pearson	7 st 2 lb (45.4 kg)		Joe Thompson	100/1	
—N/a	The King	6y h	William Samuel Cox Jr	6 st 10 lb (42.6 kg)		William Samuel Cox	50/1	
—N/a	Darriwell	4y h	Sam Cracknell	8 st 8 lb (54.4 kg)		William Algernon Guesdon (Note: A Tasmanian businessman, Guesdon used the alias "W. Rawlinson" for his racehorse ownership.)	20/1	
—N/a	Emily	3y f	J. Williamson	6 st 6 lb (40.8 kg)		Hercules Robinson	16/1	
—N/a	Glengarry	5y h	Donald Nicholson	6 st 6 lb (40.8 kg)		Louis Lawrence Smith	100/1	
—N/a	Auckland (late Maori)	4y h	Cornwell	6 st 5 lb (40.4 kg)		Mr A.E. Cornwell	12/1	
—N/a	Melita	3y f	Peter St Albans	5 st 7 lb (34.9 kg)	James Wilson	Henry J. Bowler	4/1 fav.	
—N/a	Numa Pompilius	4y g	G. Poole	5 st 7 lb (34.9 kg)		Mr C.G. Baldock	100/1	
—N/a	Firebell	4y h	G. Burton	5 st 7 lb (34.9 kg)		William Samuel Cox	8/1	
—N/a	Pride Of The Vale	3y f	Geoghegan	6 st 0 lb (38.1 kg)		Mr R.T. Reid	100/1	
—N/a	Franciscan	3y c	J. Deasy	6 st 8 lb (41.7 kg)	Stephen Mahon	Stephen Mahon	100/1	
—N/a	Device	4y m	Tom Hales	7 st 5 lb (46.7 kg)	Tom Jordan	William Pile	50/1	
Fell	Chester	4y h	Joe Morrison	9 st 0 lb (57.2 kg)	Etienne de Mestre	James White	12/1	
SCR	Savanaka	4y h	—N/a	8 st 1 lb (51.3 kg)	James Wilson	Herbert Power	16/1	
SCR	Democrat	5y h	—N/a	8 st 0 lb (50.8 kg)	Etienne de Mestre	James White		
SCR	His Lordship	3y c	—N/a	7 st 4 lb (46.3 kg)		Charles Brown Fisher		
SCR	Vulcan	3y c	—N/a	7 st 3 lb (45.8 kg)	Etienne de Mestre	Etienne de Mestre		
SCR	Roodee	3y c	—N/a	7 st 1 lb (44.9 kg)	Etienne de Mestre	James White		
SCR	Jasper	3y c	—N/a	6 st 6 lb (40.8 kg)	Etienne de Mestre	Etienne de Mestre		
SCR	Murrabinna	4y h	—N/a	6 st 5 lb (40.4 kg)		John Crozier Jr		
SCR	Coongoola	3y c	—N/a	6 st 2 lb (39.0 kg)		Mr F. Williams		
SCR	Lillian	3y f	—N/a	5 st 8 lb (35.4 kg)		Mr W. Kite		

== Prizemoney ==
First prize £1790, second prize £50, third prize £20.

== See also ==
- Melbourne Cup
- List of Melbourne Cup winners
- Victoria Racing Club
