= 1873 Melbourne Cup =

Edition of the Melbourne Cup

- Melbourne Cup
- Location: Flemington Racecourse
- Date: 6 November 1873
- Distance: 2 miles
- Winning horse: Don Juan
- Winning time: 3:36.0
- Final odds: 3/1
- Jockey: William Wilson
- Trainer: James Wilson
- Owner: W. Johnstone
- Surface: Turf
- Attendance: 63,000

The 1873 Melbourne Cup was a two-mile handicap horse race which took place on Thursday, 6 November 1873.

This was the thirteenth running of the Melbourne Cup.

Don Juan's victory was a controversial one. Immediately following the race Don Juan's victory was called into question and a protest was lodged. The Sydney Mail reported on 22 November that the protest claimed the horse was a year older than his stated four years of age. There were also rumours that Don Juan was substituted for a better horse. The protest was dismissed and the rumours were never proven.

Following morning showers, a final field of 24 horses started the race. Protos and Calaba were in front at the first post, with Protos maintaining its lead in front of King Tom and Lapidist down the back straight. King Tom took the lead approaching the final turn, but it was Don Juan that lead the field down the final straight. Don Juan pulled away to win easily, the betting favourite saluting ahead of Dagwood who held off a fast-finishing Horatio.

Don Juan won by three and a half lengths in a new record time of 3:36.0.

Three horses were injured in the race with Horatio badly splitting a hoof, while Hamlet broke down during the race. It was reported that Index returned to the paddock lame.

For trainer James Wilson it was his first Melbourne Cup victory coming after three second-place finishes. The owner of the horse was listed as "Mr W. Johnstone" which was a known alias of Melbourne bookmaker Joe Thompson. Don Juan had been listed for sale before the spring season and had been sold to grazier Joe Inglis, but remained at the stables of James Wilson until after the spring season. Thompson won so handsomely on the race that he directed some winnings to charity and built himself a mansion in East Melbourne which he named Don Juan House in tribute to the winning horse. Don Juan had also won the Caulfield Handicap and the Essendon Stakes in the lead-up to the Melbourne Cup.

Then Governor of New South Wales, Sir Hercules Robinson's horse Fitz-Yattendon finished the race in eighth place, with the governor one of the distinguished attendees at the race.

Newspaper reports of the race were limited by the withdrawal of free passes to the racecourse provided by the Victoria Racing Club, leading both The Argus and The Australasian to reduce their coverage and complain about the lack of access.

A new grandstand was opened in time for the running of the race, housing 3,000 people at the foot of the hill overlooking the final part of the course. Designed by civil engineer Robert Cooper Bagot, the secretary of the Victoria Racing Club, it was nicknamed "Bagot's Cowshed."

== Full results ==
This is the list of placegetters for the 1873 Melbourne Cup.

Place	Horse	Age Gender	Jockey	Weight	Trainer	Owner	Odds	Margin
1	Don Juan	4y h	William Wilson	6 st 12 lb (43.5 kg)	James Wilson	Mr W. Johnstone (Note: Alias of Melbourne bookmaker Joe Thomson)	3/1 fav.	3½ lengths
2	Dagworth	5y h	George Donnelly	9 st 9 lb (61.2 kg)	Etienne de Mestre	Mr. R. Bloomfield	20/1	½ length
3	Horatio	4y h	M. Thompson	7 st 13 lb (50.3 kg)	Etienne de Mestre	Etienne de Mestre	5/1	
4	The Arrow	4y h	H. Lewis	8 st 2 lb (51.7 kg)	John Tait	John Tait	10/1	
5	King Tom	4y h	Samuel Davis	6 st 12.5 lb (43.8 kg) (Note: Was supposed to carry 6st 10lb)		Mr P. Lewis	14/1	
6	Ace of Trumps	5y h	Sam Cracknell	7 st 2 lb (45.4 kg)	Tom Jordan	Mr W. Gerrard	50/1	
7	Dolphin	5y m	Nolan	7 st 11 lb (49.4 kg)		Mr W. Pearson	50/1	
8	Fitz-Yattendon	3y c	Duggan	5 st 10.5 lb (36.5 kg) (Note: Was supposed to carry 5st 9lb)		Hercules Robinson	8/1	
—N/a	Hamlet	5y h	Thomas Enderson	9 st 7 lb (60.3 kg)		Mr J. Crozier Jr	14/1	
—N/a	Priam	5y h	G. Thomson	8 st 2 lb (51.7 kg)		Mr H. Herbert	25/1	
—N/a	Lancer	5y h	Tom Hales	8 st 0 lb (50.8 kg)		Thomas Joseph Ryan	10/1	
—N/a	Exile (late Lapdog)	Aged g	Gardener	7 st 12 lb (49.9 kg)		Mr S.G. Bowler	50/1	
—N/a	King of Clubs	4y h	J. Jellett	7 st 11 lb (49.4 kg)		Eli Jellett	10/1	
—N/a	McCallum Mohr	4y h	William Enderson	7 st 11 lb (49.4 kg)	John Tait	John Tait	20/1	
—N/a	Early Morn	6y h	M. Bryan	7 st 9 lb (48.5 kg)		John Coldham	14/1	
—N/a	Calaba	4y h	T. Hill	7 st 7 lb (47.6 kg)		Mr R. Holland	20/1	
—N/a	Protos	6y g	Haughtey	7 st 7 lb (47.6 kg)		Mr S.P. Winter	33/1	
—N/a	Index	Aged g	Swannell	7 st 4 lb (46.3 kg)		Mr E. Gough	50/1	
—N/a	Benjiroo	5y h	Chalker	6 st 10 lb (42.6 kg)		Mr C.S. King	12/1	
—N/a	Lapidist	3y c	H. Grubb	6 st 11 lb (43.1 kg) (Note: Was supposed to carry 6st 10lb)	William Filgate	William Filgate	50/1	
—N/a	Victorian	Aged g	Robert Batty	6 st 10 lb (42.6 kg)		Mr K. Brown	20/1	
—N/a	Lothair	5y h	John Kean	6 st 8 lb (41.7 kg)	Mr Cassidy	Mr R.J. Hunter	50/1	
—N/a	Fearnought (NZL)	4y g	A. Ross	6 st 8 lb (41.7 kg)		Andrew Chirnside	50/1	
—N/a	Bismarck	Aged g	J. Green	6 st 7 lb (41.3 kg)		Eli Jellett	50/1	

== Prizemoney ==
First prize £1360, second prize £50, third prize £20.

== See also ==
- Melbourne Cup
- List of Melbourne Cup winners
- Victoria Racing Club
