= 1880 Melbourne Cup =

Edition of the Melbourne Cup

- Melbourne Cup
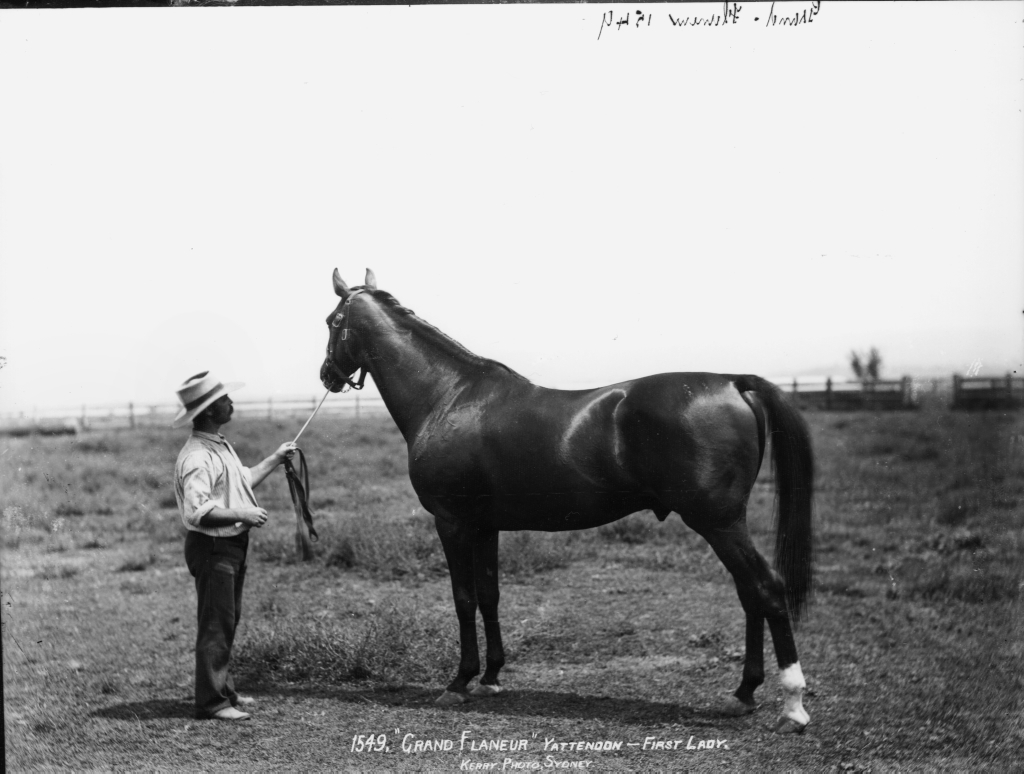
- Image of Grand Flaneur
- Location: Flemington Racecourse
- Date: 2 November 1880
- Distance: 2 miles
- Winning horse: Grand Flaneur
- Winning time: 3:34.75
- Final odds: 4/1
- Jockey: Tom Hales
- Trainer: Tom Brown
- Owner: William Long
- Surface: Turf
- Attendance: ≈100,000

The 1880 Melbourne Cup was a two-mile handicap horse race which took place on Tuesday, 2 November 1880.

This year was the twentieth running of the Melbourne Cup. The winner Grand Flaneur holds the distinction of being the only horse to win the Melbourne Cup and finish its career undefeated. Grand Flaneur won nine times including five times against the James Wilson trained Progress. Ridden by Peter St Albans, Progress started 3/1 favourite but Grand Flaneur at 4/1 won by a length despite carrying an extra stone in weight. Grand Flaneur would go on to sire future cup winners Bravo and Patron.

== The race ==
In perfect weather conditions, 22 runners started the race, the fewest since 1875. Progress and Grand Flaneur were the two standout horses before the race, with the pair having battled it out in the Victoria Derby on the Saturday before the Melbourne Cup, with Grand Flaneur winning by a length. The other favoured runner was Lord Burghley who was to be ridden by Paddy Piggott. Previous winners Chester ((1877) and Darriwell (1879) were both expected to feature prominently again in the running. New Zealand import Mata was also expected to run well.

Following a slight delay to the start due to the notoriously "wicked" Lothair kicking out and potentially injuring Darriwell, Elastic led the field for a short while, but it would be Lothair to lead at the first turn, with Richmond and Secundus at the rear of the field. Down the riverside, Totalisator and Riverton held the advantage ahead of Chester, with the three favourites well placed. It would be Lord Burghley in front at the final turn entering the Flemington straight, but Progress shot past to take what looked to be a winning lead. That was until Tom Hales on board Grand Flaneur came hard on the outside for the unbeaten horse to kick home to win by a length. Progress again finished second behind Grand Flaneur, with Lord Burghley taking third place ahead of Lothair and Richmond.

It was Hales' first Melbourne Cup victory for the popular jockey with reporters stating that he "never rode a better race in his life."

Grand Flaneur was owned by William A. Long, a representative in the New South Wales parliament. Long had purchased the horse as a yearling and left Grand Flaneur with trainer Tom Brown when the horse was in Sydney and sometimes in the care of Melbourne trainer A. Davis when stabled for racing in Victoria. The horse won its first start in the Normanby Stakes at Flemington on New Year's Day in 1880, but injury forced the horse to be spelled at Hawkesbury through the 1880 Autumn racing season. Grand Flaneur returned to racing in September 1880, winning the AJC Derby after starting as 2/1 favourite, beating home Trevallyn and Lord Lisgar in a tight finish. After winning another race at Randwick Racecourse, Grand Flaneur was taken to Melbourne for the VRC Spring Meeting. In heavy rain, Grand Flaneur won the Victoria Derby on the Saturday before the Melbourne Cup, beating Progress by a length, with the two horses well clear of the rest of the field. By becoming the third horse to win the Victoria Derby/Melbourne Cup double, following Lantern (1864) and Chester (1877), Grand Flaneur had won Long almost £20,000 in betting on the races.

This edition of the race was held during the Melbourne International Exhibition, the eighth World's fair and the first to be held in the Southern Hemisphere. The influx of visitors lead to an even greater attendance than previous editions of the race, with estimates of over 100,000 spectators at the course.

== Full results ==
This is the list of placegetters for the 1880 Melbourne Cup.

Place	Horse	Age Gender	Jockey	Weight	Trainer	Owner	Odds	Margin
1	Grand Flaneur	3y c	Tom Hales	6 st 10 lb (42.6 kg)	Tom Brown	William Alexander Long	4/1	1 length
2	Progress	3y c	Peter St Albans	5 st 10 lb (36.3 kg)	James Wilson	William Branch	3/1 fav.	½ head
3	Lord Burghley	5y h	Paddy Piggott	7 st 5 lb (46.7 kg)	Thomas Ivory	Francis Robert Lewis Rossi (Note: Sometimes known as Captain Rossi)	4/1	3 lengths
4	Lothair	3y c	Sam Cracknell	6 st 0 lb (38.1 kg)	Robert Howie	Robert Howie	20/1	
5	Richmond	8y h	Barlow	7 st 12 lb (49.9 kg)		Eli Jellett	16/1	
6	Chester	6y h	Huxley	9 st 6 lb (59.9 kg)		James White	20/1	
7	Martindale	6y h	Conner	8 st 7 lb (54.0 kg)		James White	33/1	
8	Auckland (later Maori)	6y h	Donald Nicholson	6 st 8 lb (41.7 kg) (Note: Was supposed to carry 6st 5lb)		Mr R. Warn	12/1	
9	Riverton	5y h	Burton	7 st 0 lb (44.5 kg)		John Whittingham	100/1	
10	The Wandering Jew	4y h	John Kilduff (Note: Also known as Jack Kilduff)	7 st 0 lb (44.5 kg)	Tom Jordan	John Eden Savill	100/1	
11	Mata (NZL)	6y g	Clifford	8 st 2 lb (51.7 kg)		Mr R.H. Vallance	7/1	
12	Rivalry	4y m	William Murphy	7 st 8 lb (48.1 kg) (Note: Was supposed to carry 7st 3lb)	Tom Jordan	Tom Jordan	50/1	
13	Totalisator	3y c	Bowes	5 st 9 lb (35.8 kg)		Mr J.H. Hill	25/1	
14	First Water	4y h	Campbell	8 st 1 lb (51.3 kg)	Tom Jordan	William Pile	20/1	
15	Napper Tandy	5y h	Williamson	7 st 1 lb (44.9 kg)		Mr W.H. Kent	12/1	
16	Secundus	5y h	Roarty	7 st 10 lb (49.0 kg) (Note: Was supposed to carry 7st 7lb)		John Mayo	25/1	
17	Rothschild (later The Assyrian)	3y c	Quinn	6 st 4 lb (39.9 kg)	Tom Jordan	William Pile	100/1	
18	Elastic	4y h	Emsworth	6 st 13 lb (44.0 kg)		John Mayo	33/1	
19	Woodlands	6y g	J. King	8 st 10 lb (55.3 kg)		Mr T. Jones	33/1	
20	Banter	9y g	J. Geoghegen	7 st 13 lb (50.3 kg)		Mr C.L. Macdonald	100/1	
21	Bosworth	5y h	Walker	8 st 8 lb (54.4 kg)		Eli Jellett	25/1	
Last	Darriwell	6y h	M. O'Brien	8 st 7 lb (54.0 kg)	William E. Dakin	Thomas Elder	12/1	
SCR	South Hamilton	4y h	—N/a	8 st 1 lb (51.3 kg)	James Wilson	William Branch		
SCR	Imperial	11y g	—N/a	7 st 6 lb (47.2 kg)	—N/a	William Samuel Cox		
SCR	Trevallyn	3y c	—N/a	6 st 10 lb (42.6 kg)	—N/a	Mr S. Martin		
SCR	Geraldine	3y f	—N/a	6 st 8 lb (41.7 kg)	Tom Brown	William Alexander Long		
SCR	Pawnbroker	4y h	—N/a	6 st 8 lb (41.7 kg)	—N/a	Mr R.T. Moore		
SCR	Respite	3y c	—N/a	6 st 7 lb (41.3 kg)	James Wilson	James Wilson		
SCR	Lord Lisgar	3y c	—N/a	5 st 10 lb (36.3 kg)	—N/a	Francis Robert Lewis Rossi (Note: Sometimes known as Captain Rossi)		
SCR	Stockbridge	9y h	—N/a	7 st 6 lb (47.2 kg)	—N/a	James Bathe		

== Prizemoney ==
First prize £1485, second prize £200, third prize £100.

== See also ==
- Melbourne Cup
- List of Melbourne Cup winners
- Victoria Racing Club
