= 1889 Melbourne Cup =

Edition of the Melbourne Cup

- Melbourne Cup
- Location: Flemington Racecourse
- Date: 5 Nov 1889
- Distance: 2 miles
- Winning horse: Bravo
- Winning time: 3:32.50
- Final odds: 8/1
- Jockey: Jack Anwin
- Trainer: T. Wilson
- Surface: Turf

The 1889 Melbourne Cup was a two-mile handicap horse race which took place on Tuesday, 5 November 1889.

This year was the 29th running of the Melbourne Cup. The race is best known for 1890 winner Carbine finishing second. Bravo was sired by 1880 Melbourne Cup winner Grand Flaneur.

This is the list of placegetters for the 1889 Melbourne Cup.

Place	Name	Jockey
1	Bravo	Jack Anwin
2	Carbine	M. O'Brien
3	Melos	Norton

== See also ==
- Melbourne Cup
- List of Melbourne Cup winners
- Victoria Racing Club
