= 1872 Melbourne Cup =

Annual horse race in Victoria, Australia

- Melbourne Cup
- Location: Flemington Racecourse
- Date: 7 November 1872
- Distance: 2 miles
- Winning horse: The Quack
- Winning time: 3:39.00
- Final odds: 5/1
- Jockey: William Enderson
- Trainer: John Tait
- Owner: John Tait
- Surface: Turf
- Attendance: 40,000

The 1872 Melbourne Cup was a two-mile handicap horse race that took place on Thursday, 7 November 1872.

This year was the twelfth running of the Melbourne Cup. It was the fourth Melbourne Cup win for owner and trainer John Tait.

The Quack was a half-brother to 1870 Melbourne Cup winner, Nimblefoot.

There would be 22 runners in the race following the withdrawals of the heavily-backed Pyrrhus, as well as Kingfisher, Hamlet and Lady Athole. Dagworth had been supported by many following its win in The Metropolitan in the autumn at Randwick, but the horse had not impressed local judges since arriving in Melbourne. Following its win in the Melbourne Stakes the previous weekend, Contessa started as favourite for the Melbourne Cup looking to be the first mare to win the race.

In warm and dusty conditions whipped up by a hot northerly wind, Valentine, Irish King, and Benjiroo held the early lead, while King of the Ring was well behind the field at the first post. Benjiroo would lead the race down the back straight, but faded before the final turn for the winning post. In its place The Quack took up the running and lead comfortably down the Flemington straight to win by two lengths. The Ace finished second closely followed by Dagworth who had come hard at the finish.

Tasmanian-bred, The Quack had finished second in The Metropolitan behind Dagworth in the autumn, repeating the performance of the previous year's winner The Pearl. To the dismay of the local contingent, the first five runners were all bred outside of Victoria.

== Full results ==
This is the list of placegetters for the 1872 Melbourne Cup.

Place	Horse	Age Gender	Jockey	Weight	Trainer	Owner	Odds	Margin
1	The Quack	6y h	William Enderson	7 st 10 lb (49.0 kg)	John Tait	John Tait	5/1	2 lengths
2	The Ace	4y h	Tom Hales	8 st 4 lb (52.6 kg)	Harry Tothill	Thomas Joseph Ryan	5/1	Neck
3	Dagworth	4y h	George Donnelly	7 st 12 lb (49.9 kg)	Etienne de Mestre	Mr. R. Bloomfield	13/2	
4	Barbelle	Aged m	Joe Kean	8 st 7 lb (54.0 kg)		Edward Lee	20/1	
5	Misty Morn	6y h	C. Hough	7 st 9 lb (48.5 kg)	Robert Standish Sevior	Austin Saqui	33/1	
6	Benjiroo	4y h	Chalker	6 st 4 lb (39.9 kg)		Mr C.S. King	50/1	
7	King of the Ring	3y c	William Wilson	6 st 12 lb (43.5 kg)	James Wilson	Joe Thompson	13/2	
8	Early Morn	5y h	James Wilson Jr	7 st 4 lb (46.3 kg) (Note: Was supposed to carry 7st 1lb)	James Wilson	John Coldham	10/1	
9	Patriarch	3y c	Sam Cracknell	6 st 2 lb (39.0 kg) (Note: Was supposed to carry 6st 0lb)		Edward Lee	12/1	
10	Dolphin	4y m	H. Grubb	6 st 4 lb (39.9 kg)		William Filgate	10/1	
11	The Count	5y h	H. Lewis	8 st 1 lb (51.3 kg)	John Tait	John Tait	20/1	
—N/a	The Baron	Aged g	McClelland	8 st 2 lb (51.7 kg) (Note: Was supposed to carry 8st 1lb)		Andrew Chirnside	100/1	
—N/a	Valentine	Aged g	Sullivan	8 st 1 lb (51.3 kg)		Patrick Keighran	16/1	
—N/a	Irish King	4y h	Swales	8 st 0 lb (50.8 kg)	Mr Cassidy	James J. Miller	16/1	
—N/a	Emblem	5y h	Tom Corrigan	7 st 11 lb (49.4 kg) (Note: Was supposed to carry 7st 9lb)		Mr E. Moran	16/1	
—N/a	Gironde (FRA)	4y m	Rowe	7 st 8 lb (48.1 kg) (Note: Was supposed to carry 7st 7lb)		Andrew Chirnside	100/1	
—N/a	Boatman	Aged h	W. Rees	7 st 4 lb (46.3 kg)	Robert Standish Sevior	Mr R. Whitehead	20/1	
—N/a	Contessa	4y m	J. Sherringham	7 st 3 lb (45.8 kg)	William Filgate	William Filgate	4/1 fav.	
—N/a	Planter	5y h	Samuel Davis	6 st 12 lb (43.5 kg) (Note: Was supposed to carry 6st 10lb)		Mr J. Evans	50/1	
—N/a	Shannon	4y m	Nolan	6 st 4 lb (39.9 kg)		Andrew Chirnside	50/1	
—N/a	Athelstane	5y h	Robinson	5 st 9 lb (35.8 kg) (Note: Was supposed to carry 5st 7lb)		Mr J. McFarland	100/1	
—N/a	Novice (late Alfred)	Aged g	Swannell	5 st 11.5 lb (37.0 kg) (Note: Was supposed to carry 5st 7lb)		Mr A. Anderson	100/1	

== Prizemoney ==
First prize £1090, second prize £50, third prize £20.

== See also ==
- Melbourne Cup
- List of Melbourne Cup winners
- Victoria Racing Club
