= 1879 Melbourne Cup =

Annual horse race in Melbourne, Victoria

- Melbourne Cup
- Illustrations of the race published in The Illustrated Australian News
- Location: Flemington Racecourse
- Date: 4 November 1879
- Distance: 2 miles
- Winning horse: Darriwell
- Winning time: 3:30.75
- Final odds: 33/1
- Jockey: Sam Cracknell
- Trainer: William E. Dakin
- Owner: William Algernon Guesdon
- Surface: Turf
- Attendance: 80,000

The 1879 Melbourne Cup was a two-mile handicap horse race which took place on Tuesday, 4 November 1879.

This year was the nineteenth running of the Melbourne Cup. The race was won by Darriwell in a then record time of 3:30.75, beating the time of Chester from 1877.

== Entries and odds ==
The "national handicap race of Australia" saw a field of more than 30 potential runners from an initial entry of 122 acceptances. Following its clear win in the Victoria Derby on the Saturday, dark grey colt Suwarrow was installed as short-priced favourite, with the horse trained by Bob Howie. After being withdrawn the previous year, 1877 Cup favourite Savanaka was again one of the fancied runners, although the horse was now the top-weight with Richmond, who was runner-up in the 1875 Melbourne Cup as a three-year-old. Wellington returned for another shot at the Cup, and would again be listed at short odds, despite carrying a greater weight handicap. Following a win in the 1878 Metropolitan Handicap in Sydney, Democrat was considered something of an outside chance, with 1879 Metropolitan winner Secundus rated a better chance. New Zealand-bred runner Le Loup was less-fancied by some observers following its efforts when it missed the start in the Melbourne Stakes, finishing third behind First King on the Saturday before the race.

== The race ==
Following a number of race day withdrawals, 27 runners greeted the starter, in bright sunny conditions after morning cloud dissipated. A soft sea breeze did not pick up much of the dust that had marred previous editions of the race. Riverton, Monarque, Tom Kirk, Darriwell and Suwarrow had the best of the start, with Suwarrow leading at the first turn. Suwarrow extended its lead down the riverside, with Riverton trying to bridge a gap of a couple of lengths. At the final turn it appeared that Darriwell had taken the lead, but Suwarrow still maintained an advantage on the inside. It was in the Flemington straight that Darriwell made a decisive move, with jockey Sam Cracknell piloting the horse forward to pass Suwarrow to win. Sweetmeat came through late to finish second, with Wellington fourth behind Suwarrow. There were some complaints that Riverton had caused interference racing alongside Suwarrow during the final mile, but not protests were lodged. Two two top-weighted horses Savanaka and Richmond didn't feature prominently in the race.

Darriwell has bred in Victoria by John Ord Inglis and sold as a colt to Tasmanian businessman William Guesdon. The horse raced with little success in Tasmania and was sent back to Victoria to be trained by William E. Dakin, a former British cavalry officer. Darriwell had previously won races at Flemington including the 1878 Spring Handicap, 1879 Brunswick States and another race in March 1879. The horse was unplaced in the previous year's Melbourne Cup won by Calamia, and unplaced in the inaugural running of the Caulfield Cup. Guesdon was the first Tasmanian owner to win the Melbourne Cup, and was a previous committee member of the Tasmanian Racing Club. It was reported that Guesdon didn't back his horse for large sums of money to win the race, having been convinced by Dakin that the other horse in his stable, Le Loup, had a greater chance at winning the race. It was said that Darriwell was "plain in appearance" and "the last horse anyone would select for a two-mile race."

== Full results ==
This is the list of placegetters for the 1879 Melbourne Cup.

Place	Horse	Age Gender	Jockey	Weight	Trainer	Owner	Odds	Margin
1	Darriwell	5y h	Sam Cracknell	7 st 4 lb (46.3 kg)	William E. Dakin	William Algernon Guesdon (Note: A Tasmanian businessman, Guesdon used the alias "W. Rawlinson" for his racehorse ownership.)	33/1	½ length
2	Sweetmeat	4y h	Donald Nicholson	7 st 1 lb (44.9 kg)		Thomas Ivory	7/1	Head
3	Suwarrow	3y c	George Williams	6 st 3 lb (39.5 kg) (Note: Was supposed to carry 6st 1lb)	Robert Howie	Robert Howie	13/4 fav.	
4	Columbus	7y h	Barr	7 st 7 lb (47.6 kg)		Edward Alfred Johnson-Boe	50/1	
5	Wellington	4y h	William Murphy	8 st 2 lb (51.7 kg)		Edward Alfred Johnson-Boe	10/1	
6	Colima	5y m	Roarty	6 st 12 lb (43.5 kg)		William Forrester	100/1	
7	Riverton	4y h	John Kilduff (Note: Also known as Jack Kilduff)	6 st 8 lb (41.7 kg) (Note: Was supposed to carry 6st 3lb)		John Whittingham	20/1	
8	Monarque	4y h	J. Williams	6 st 12 lb (43.5 kg)		Frank Leng	33/1	
9	Secundus (late Highlander)	4y h	O'Connor	6 st 7 lb (41.3 kg)		John Mayo	4/1	
10	Falmouth	3y c	John Gainsford	6 st 4 lb (39.9 kg)		George Donnelly	50/1	
11	The Wandering Jew	3y c	Geoghegan	6 st 0 lb (38.1 kg)	Tom Jordan	John Eden Savill	33/1	
12	Waxy	7y g	Kelly	6 st 9 lb (42.2 kg)	Ike Carslake	James Liddell Purves	33/1	
13	Democrat	6y h	Gordon	8 st 2 lb (51.7 kg)		James White	100/1	
14	Savanaka	5y h	Tom Hales	9 st 3 lb (58.5 kg)	James Wilson	Herbert Power	5/1	
15	Lord Harry	8y g	Brickwood Colley	8 st 4 lb (52.6 kg)		Mr M. Loughlin	12/1	
—N/a	Richmond	7y h	Walker	9 st 3 lb (58.5 kg)		Eli Jellett	25/1	
—N/a	Le Loup (NZL)	5y h	William Yeomans	8 st 4 lb (52.6 kg)	William E. Dakin	Mr G. Fraser	33/1	
—N/a	Strathearn	5y h	Sam Davis	7 st 8 lb (48.1 kg)	John Tait	John Tait	25/1	
—N/a	Tom Kirk	8y g	J. King	7 st 7 lb (47.6 kg)		Mr W. Frederick	20/1	
—N/a	Levant	5y h	Braithwaite	7 st 7 lb (47.6 kg)		Mr A. Davies	50/1	
—N/a	Glenormiston	5y h	J. Williamson	7 st 3 lb (45.8 kg)	William Filgate	William Filgate	33/1	
—N/a	K.C.B.	4y h	Deasy	6 st 8 lb (41.7 kg) (Note: Was supposed to carry 6st 7lb)	John Tait	John Tait	100/1	
—N/a	Tidal Wave	4y h	Vouchier	6 st 4 lb (39.9 kg)	Stephen Mahon	Stephen Mahon	100/1	
—N/a	Roland	4y h	Burton	6 st 0 lb (38.1 kg)	Stephen Mahon	Stephen Mahon	100/1	
—N/a	Terrific	3y c	Greville	5 st 12 lb (37.2 kg)		Mr J. McPhail	100/1	
—N/a	Caractacus	3y c	G. Riley	5 st 12 lb (37.2 kg)	Etienne de Mestre	Etienne de Mestre	100/1	
—N/a	Pollio	3y c	Fallon	5 st 9 lb (35.8 kg) (Note: Was supposed to carry 5st 7lb)		Mr G. Livingstone	100/1	
SCR	His Grace	3y c	—N/a	7 st 0 lb (44.5 kg)		Mr J.R. Cowell		
SCR	Fau-blas	3y c	—N/a	6 st 4 lb (39.9 kg)		James Liddell Purves		
SCR	Earl of Mar	4y c	—N/a	6 st 2 lb (39.0 kg)		Mr Jeffrey		
SCR	Caspian	3y c	—N/a	6 st 2 lb (39.0 kg)	James Wilson	Alexander K. Finlay		
SCR	Geide Olgothach	3y c	—N/a	6 st 0 lb (38.1 kg)		James J. Miller		
SCR	Adventurer	3y c	—N/a	5 st 11 lb (36.7 kg)		Fitzwilliam Wentworth		
SCR	Chatterbox	3y c	—N/a	5 st 10 lb (36.3 kg)		Louis Lawrence Smith		
SCR	Credit	4y h	—N/a	5 st 12 lb (37.2 kg)	—N/a	William J. Clarke		
SCR	Zambesi	4y h	—N/a	6 st 10 lb (42.6 kg)	—N/a	Andrew Chirnside		
SCR	Narrabri	3y c	—N/a	5 st 7 lb (34.9 kg)	—N/a	Mr J. Evans		
SCR	First Water	3y c	—N/a	6 st 4 lb (39.9 kg)	Tom Jordan	William Pile		

== Prizemoney ==
The Victoria Racing Club increased the prizemoney for the second and third placegetters for the 1879 race, where previously (since 1868) the third place runner would receive their initial stake returned.

First prize £1645, second prize £200, third prize £100.

== See also ==
- Melbourne Cup
- List of Melbourne Cup winners
- Victoria Racing Club
