= 1877 Melbourne Cup =

Annual horse race in Melbourne, Victoria

- Melbourne Cup
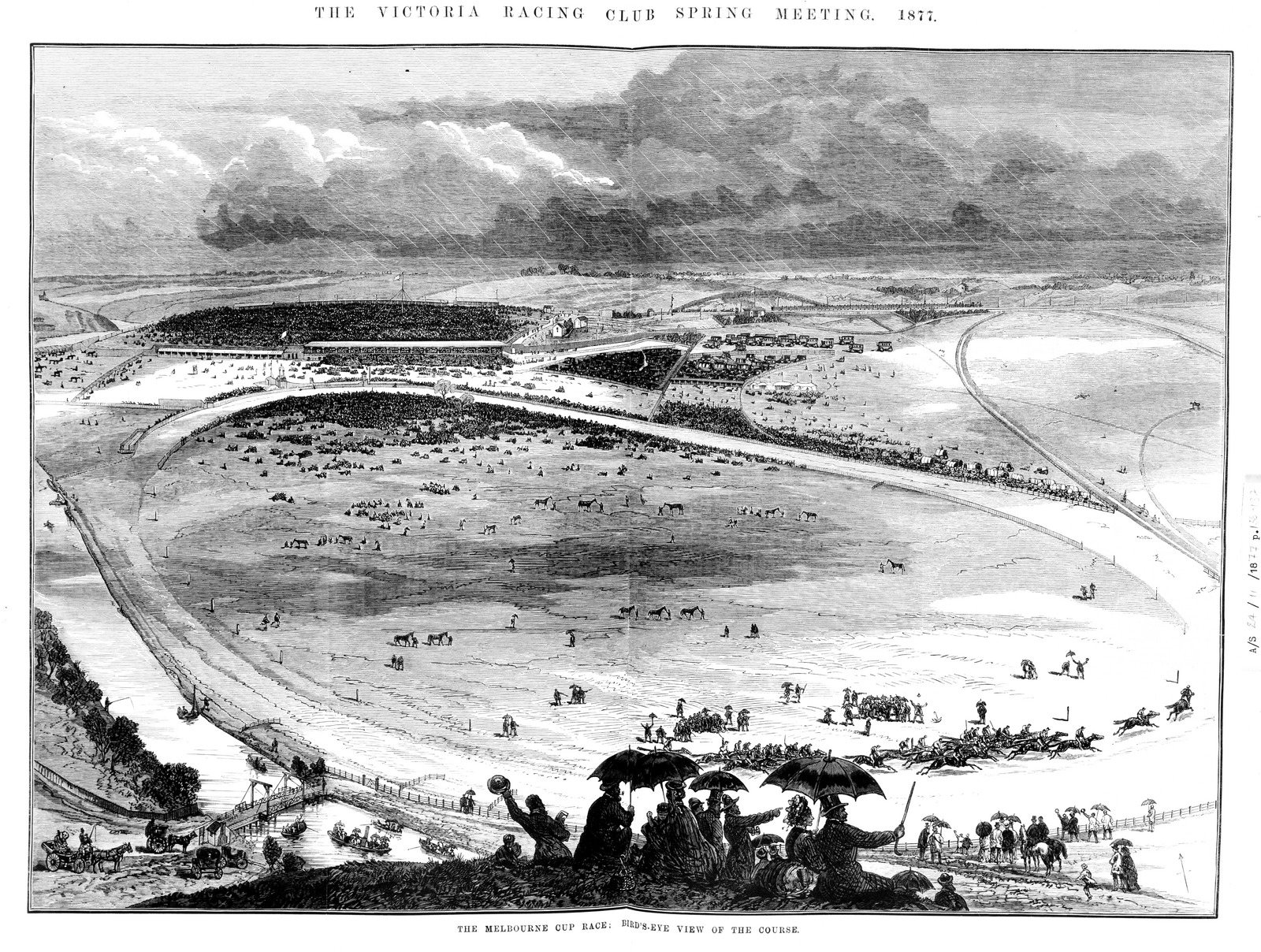
- Wood engraving of the race published in the Australasian Sketcher
- Location: Flemington Racecourse
- Date: 6 November 1877
- Distance: 2 miles
- Winning horse: Chester
- Winning time: 3:33.50
- Final odds: 5/1
- Jockey: Paddy Piggott
- Trainer: Etienne de Mestre
- Owner: James White
- Conditions: Slippery and muddy
- Surface: Turf
- Attendance: ≈85,000

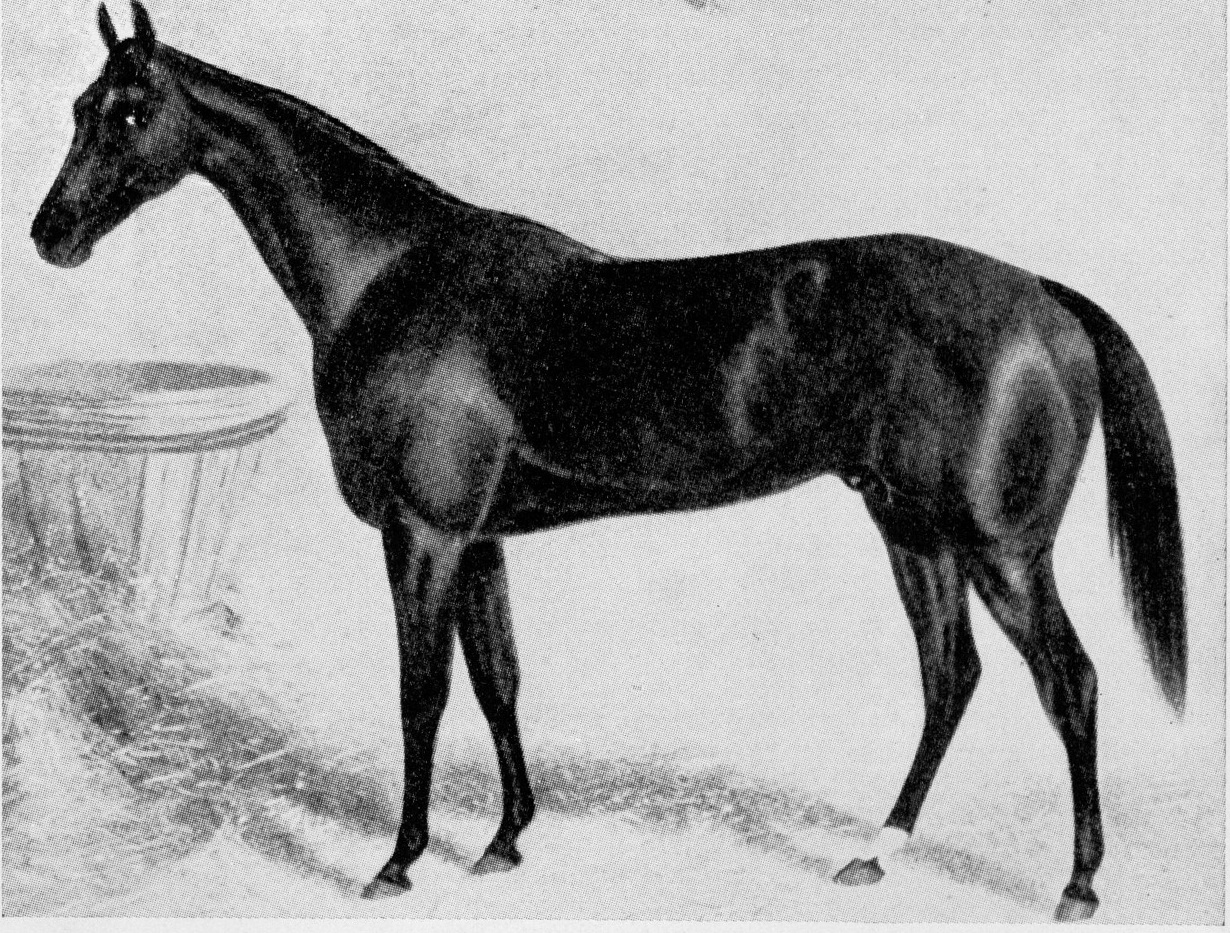
Illustration of the winner Chester

The 1877 Melbourne Cup was a two-mile handicap horse race which took place on Tuesday, 6 November 1877.

This year was the seventeenth running of the Melbourne Cup. Although the track was slippery and muddy, the race time of 3:33.50 was a new record.

== Entries and odds ==
Following its win in the 1877 Melbourne Stakes on the Saturday before the Melbourne Cup, Robinson Crusoe the colt that survived of the SS City of Melbourne shipwreck the previous year had firmed in pre-race betting. Other runners that were highly favoured included The Painter, Aldinga and Tom Kirk. 1874 Melbourne Cup winner Haricot, now owned by William Samuel Cox, wasn't favoured to be among the leading pack, whereas The King was the more likely winner from Cox's horses. Of the lightly-weighted runners, Pluto and Amendment were fancied, as was the winner of the 1877 AJC Derby Woodlands. Woodlands had been prepared with the Melbourne Cup in mind, skipping the Victoria Derby. Owned by bookmaker Joe Silberberg, Woodlands was the subject of a bungled attempt to nobble the horse in the days before the race, with assailants throwing glass and oyster shells onto the colt's stable. Woodlands emerged unscathed from the attack with only minor scratches.

Chester, the Victoria Derby winner on the Saturday before the Melbourne Cup in wet conditions, was said to be a strong chance of repeating the performance of Briseis by winning the Melbourne Cup, but would not start the race as favourite, with plenty of money behind James Wilson's trained horse Savanaka to be ridden by Peter St Albans. Savanaka had been kept out of many of the lead-up races, with Wilson trying to win his third Melbourne Cup, although Savanaka was owned by VRC committee member and steward Herbert Power.

== The race ==
In the first truly wet Melbourne Cup race, Etienne de Mestre sent out Chester without full horseshoe plates, instead electing just to have just a few nails hammered into the horse's hooves to prevent the colt from slipping. There were 33 runners that started the race, following the withdrawal of a number of runners. The rain eased just before the running of the race, with Fisherman rushing to the front. Both Robinson Crusoe and Amendment had been left at the start losing ground on the field. Fisherman had set a fast pace and joining it in the lead was Waxy. 1875 Melbourne Cup winner Wollomai joined the lead bunch down the riverside straight with Tom Kirk. Just after the far turn, The King slipped and fell, while Glemormiston joined the leaders as Fisherman started to fall back. It was at this point that Waxy fell and failed to finish, with the jockey injured and taken to hospital. The fall of Waxy severely interfered with Savanaka who lost a lot of ground behind what was a large leading pack.

As the field turned for home, Glenormiston was leading just in front of Chester and The Vagabond. Glenormiston faded down the Flemington straight, leaving Chester to jump well clear of The Vagabond. Chester won in a close finish after jockey Paddy Piggott had eased off thinking the race won. Savanaka sprinted down the straight to almost catch the winner, recovering from the earlier interference to almost give Wilson and St Albans the win. The Vagabond came home third, with Tom Kirk beating home Glenormiston for fourth.

For the winning jockey, it was Piggott's second Melbourne Cup win following his win on board Haricot in 1874, while for trainer Etienne de Mestre, it was his fourth win in the race, equalling John Tait's record.

Newspaper The Australasian criticised James Wilson's stable for the secrecy behind the preparation of Savanaka commenting "Certain we are that with the general public, there is a feeling of intense satisfaction that the clever party at St Albans, whose deeds are dark and ways mysterious, got bowled over for once and that de Mestre won the Cup for a man who races for sport, not money."

Bookmaker Joe Thompson and others in the ring paid out big sums on Chester's win, including £10,000 to James White the owner of the winner.

Attendance was down on the previous year, mostly due to the unfavourable weather conditions. Estimates ranged from 80,000 to 90,000 people were at the racecourse which turned into something of a quagmire.

== Full results ==
This is the list of placegetters for the 1877 Melbourne Cup.

Place	Horse	Age Gender	Jockey	Weight	Trainer	Owner	Odds	Margin
1	Chester	3y c	Paddy Piggott	6 st 12 lb (43.5 kg)	Etienne de Mestre	James White	5/1	½ head
2	Savanaka	3y c	Peter St Albans	6 st 2 lb (39.0 kg)	James Wilson	Herbert Power	4/1 fav.	3 lengths
3	The Vagabond (late Wizard)	4y h	Charles Ivemy	7 st 0 lb (44.5 kg)		George W. Petty	16/1	
4	Tom Kirk	6y g	J. Mascall	7 st 4 lb (46.3 kg)	Ike Carslake	Mr C. James (Note: Alias of Friedrich Wilhelm Prell, a Melbourne businessman.)	16/1	
5	Glenormiston	3y c	George Williams	5 st 12 lb (37.2 kg)	William Filgate	William Filgate	16/1	
6	Woodlands	3y c	Connor	5 st 7 lb (34.9 kg)	Joe Cook	Joe J. Silberberg	8/1	
7	Pluto	3y c	Williamson	6 st 0 lb (38.1 kg)	William Lang	Mr Phillips	16/1	
8	Amendment	3y c	J. Williams	5 st 12 lb (37.2 kg)	John Tait	John Tait	15/1	
9	Lockleys	3y c	Donald Nicholson	6 st 11 lb (43.1 kg)	Tom Jordan	Tom Jordan	50/1	
10	Pride Of The Hills	4y h	J. Jenkins	9 st 0 lb (57.2 kg)		Mr R.T. Reid	25/1	
11	Wollomai	8y h	Robert Batty	8 st 11 lb (55.8 kg)		John Cleeland	20/1	
12	Royalty	3y c	Braithwaite	6 st 7 lb (41.3 kg)		Mr C. Edwards	50/1	
13	The Painter	5y h	Sam Davis	8 st 0 lb (50.8 kg)		Charles Brown Fisher	12/1	
14	Robinson Crusoe	4y h	Joe Morrison	8 st 10 lb (55.3 kg)		Charles Brown Fisher	12/1	
—N/a	Imperial	8y g	D. Sullivan	8 st 5 lb (53.1 kg)		William Samuel Cox	50/1	
—N/a	Janitor	5y h	Brickwood Colley	8 st 4 lb (52.6 kg)		John Mayo	100/1	
—N/a	Newminster	4y h	William Yeomans	8 st 3 lb (52.2 kg)		Andrew Chirnside	50/1	
—N/a	Kingfisher	Aged g	Huxley	8 st 1 lb (51.3 kg)		Mr W.S. Hill	33/1	
—N/a	Aldinga	4y h	Tom Hales	7 st 10 lb (49.0 kg)	William E. Dakin	Samuel Gardiner	8/1	
—N/a	Haricot	7y g	McInnes	7 st 7 lb (47.6 kg)	Ike Carslake	William Samuel Cox	14/1	
—N/a	Coquette	6y m	Harrison	7 st 4 lb (46.3 kg)		Mr W. Mackenzie	100/1	
—N/a	Filibuster	4y h	William Murphy	7 st 2 lb (45.4 kg)		Eli Jellett	20/1	
—N/a	Artful Joe	5y g	James Wilson Jr	6 st 12 lb (43.5 kg)	James Wilson	James Wilson	20/1	
—N/a	Fisherman	5y h	Power	6 st 12 lb (43.5 kg)		Mr Grant	100/1	
—N/a	Ralph Leigh	4y h	McLachlan	6 st 9 lb (42.2 kg)		James Bathe	33/1	
—N/a	Device	3y f	John Kilduff (Note: Also known as Jack Kilduff)	6 st 3 lb (39.5 kg)		Mr Rounsevell	100/1	
—N/a	The Diver	7y h	Walter Higginbotham	9 st 2 lb (58.1 kg)		Charles Madden Lloyd	25/1	
—N/a	Lord Harry	6y g	Nolan	6 st 8 lb (41.7 kg) (Note: Was supposed to carry 6st 6lb)		Mr A. Smith	100/1	
—N/a	Peerless	4y m	King	6 st 9 lb (42.2 kg)	Stephen Mahon	Stephen Mahon	25/1	
—N/a	Waterford	3y c	T. Aspinall	6 st 9 lb (42.2 kg)		Mr H.J. Bowler	33/1	
—N/a	Adelaide	4y m	W. Hughes	8 st 0 lb (50.8 kg)		Mr H. Phillips	33/1	
Fell	Waxy	5y h	Jerrard	6 st 6 lb (40.8 kg) (Note: Was supposed to carry 6st 2lb)		Mr Henty	100/1	
Fell	The King	6y g	Heywood	7 st 2 lb (45.4 kg)		William Samuel Cox	20/1	
SCR	Irish Stew	5y g	—N/a	7 st 5 lb (46.7 kg)	—N/a	Mr W. Dargin		
SCR	Meteor	5y h	—N/a	6 st 12 lb (43.5 kg)	—N/a	Mr Paterson		
SCR	Salisbury	3y c	—N/a	6 st 3 lb (39.5 kg)	—N/a	Mr Drewett		
SCR	Devilshoof	3y c	—N/a	5 st 12 lb (37.2 kg)	—N/a	Joe Thompson		
SCR	Idalia	3y f	—N/a	5 st 7 lb (34.9 kg)	James Wilson	James Wilson		
SCR	Hotspur	3y c	—N/a	5 st 7 lb (34.9 kg)	—N/a	Mr Holmes		
SCR	Explosion	3y c	—N/a	5 st 7 lb (34.9 kg)	—N/a	James White		

== Prizemoney ==
First prize £1870, second prize £50, third prize £20.

== See also ==
- Melbourne Cup
- List of Melbourne Cup winners
- Victoria Racing Club
