= Salt Clay Creek railway disaster =

Railway accident in Australia

Coordinates: 34.6492°S 147.9868°E

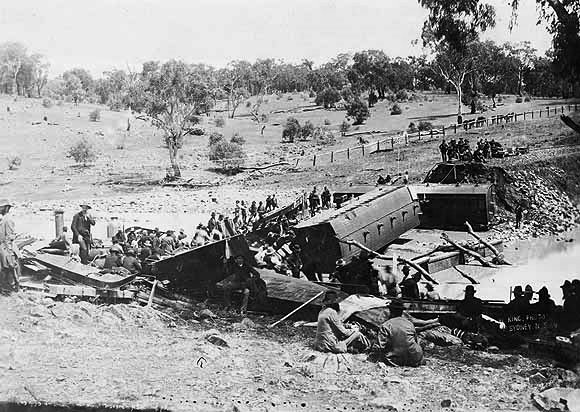
- The derailed train

Details
- Date: 28 January 1885
- Country: Australia

The Salt Clay Creek railway disaster was one of Australia's first railway accidents involving multiple fatalities. It occurred on the evening of 25 January 1885, when a mail train from Albury to Sydney failed to negotiate a flooded creek, around 5 km from Cootamundra. Seven people were killed and dozens seriously injured.

== History ==
=== Background ===
The railway between Melbourne and Sydney, Australia's two most populous cities, consisted of two separate lines:

- The southern section (broad gauge) in Victoria, from Melbourne to Wodonga, was completed in November 1873.
- The northern section (standard gauge) in New South Wales, from Albury to Sydney, was officially opened on 3 February 1881.

Wodonga and Albury, on opposite sides of the Murray River, were only connected by a road bridge, across which interstate goods and passengers had to pass before continuing their journey. It was not until 14 June 1883, when the broad gauge line from Melbourne was extended over the river, that passengers and goods were able (Customs permitting) to cross from one side of Albury's No. 1 platform to the other, thus creating the Sydney Express.

A critical section of the line, and the last to be completed, (Note: The section from Cootamundra to Bethungra was constructed 1874–1878 by Amos & Co.) was that between Junee and Cootamundra.

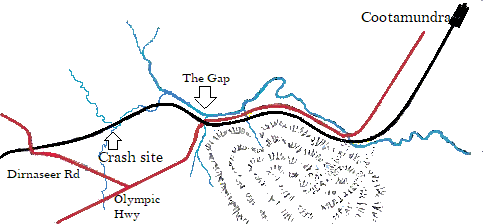
Location of the crash

Salt Clay Creek snakes around from mid RHS, passes under line then down to left and under Dirnaseer Road.

Rail miles to Sydney in 1885 (Note: Single track only; duplication of the line from Junee to Cootamundra was not completed until 1946, much of the delay being incurred by the Bethungra railway spiral.)
Albury	387
Wagga Wagga	310
(Harefield)	295
Junee Junction	288
Illabo	277
Bethungra	269
(Frampton)	263
(Salt Clay Creek crossing)	255.52 (Note: Railway distances were customarily measured in decimal miles. The discrepancy in distances from Cootamundra, 1.52 (Railway records) v. 3 (actual distance) has not been explained.)
(Another creek crossing)	255.41
(Mullaly's Siding)	255
(Mullaly's Creek crossing)	254.12
Cootamundra	254

=== Sunday 25 January 1885 ===
The Melbourne–Sydney Express did not run on Sundays. Instead, it was the mail (stopping all stations) train (Note: The locomotive has been identified as C79 class built by Beyer-Peacock in May 1877 and numbered 81. It was rebuilt in April 1887 then around 1900 modified to 4-4-2T tank class and renumbered 1302, scrapped in 1937. The mail van was a four-wheeled model, No. 4; second-class Redfern carriage No. 188; Hudson sleeping car, No. 3; first-class Redfern carriage No. 74; and Redfern brake van, No. 47.) which left Albury for Sydney on the afternoon of 25 January 1885 with around 50 passengers, perhaps as many as sixteen (Note: Names mentioned as members of this party include Israel Barnard, Oscar Barnett (Thompson's brother-in-law), John Cohen, Henry "Harry" Giles, Joseph Harper, Harry Haines, Joseph Levy, Thomas O'Brien, John Pattison, Abe Schneider, Austin Saqui, Joe Thompson, Harry Towers, and Lawrence Zucker, bookmakers, also George Jacobson (Schneider's nephew and clerk), Wellesley Wellman, a wealthy squatter of Wagga, and Dr Cleaver Woods of Wodonga.) being Melbourne bookmakers, among them Joe "Leviathan" Thompson and John Pattison, off to the lucrative Anniversary Day races at Randwick. The driver of the train, which comprised only two carriages, sleeping car, and the mail and guard's (brake) vans, was Andy Moodie, his fireman Dick Wall, and the guard Sam Murray.

There was widespread rain in the Riverina that weekend, the region between Bethungra and Cootamundra being particularly heavy. The observed rainfall of 10.5 inches (270 mm) in 48 hours, was the heaviest recorded at Cootamundra to that date, turning its streets to rivers. Following an unusually heavy downpour, the previously insignificant Salt Clay Creek became a torrent, rising 10 feet (3.0 m) in 90 minutes, inundating the railway track, the culvert being unable to handle the flow. The ballast washed away, along with much of the embankment. Another section, closer to Cootamundra, was similarly affected, perhaps worse.

The number of stops made by this train between Albury and Wagga is not recorded, but those succeeding are known with some certainty: They left Wagga Wagga at 17:15 in heavy rain, Junee junction at 18:20 or 18:30, Illabo at 18:55, and Bethungra at 19:14, the driver having been given the "all clear" by the station-master. At 19:45 it was not yet dark, when coming around a slight curve the driver saw that the track was totally submerged under the fast-flowing creek. He applied the air brake and reversed the engine, but too late. The rails and sleepers, no longer supported, gave way, and one or more carriages were derailed. The engine and its tender almost made it to solid ground, but lost traction and fell back on the second-class carriage. The coupling broke and that carriage skewed around, collapsing into the stream, while the following cars fell on their sides, the sleeping car being unroofed. The first-class carriage, having smashed into the sleeping car, was flooded but remained intact, however the mail van following was smashed to bits. The brake van survived but sunk into the stream. Moodie was reported as saying the crash might have been averted if he had never applied the brake, later disavowed.

There was no shortage of witnesses to the fact that the railway was inundated in various places: Michael John Mullaly was proprietor of the mill on Cootamundry Creek (then variously known as Hurley's or Mullaly's Creek). (Note: In 1893 Mullaly's mill was sold to D. Stratton and Co., to be managed by John Thomas Stratton (1858–1923), son of the founder, David Stratton.) Seeing how the track was inundated there, he rode into Cootamundra and about 18:45 notified Henry Thomas Giddy, the stationmaster, to get a message to Bethungra railway station, but the Railway's telegraph line was dead, as was the Post Office line, hardly surprising, as they ran on the same poles. Giddy and several others reached the Mullaly's Creek culvert at "The Gap", but could not get across, deterred as much by the floating logs and trees as the rushing water. When the torrent subsided a little, James Cambourne, head of the four gangers responsible for maintaining the section "south" of Cootamundra, set up a red light on a cliff (elsewhere described as a railway overpass) as a warning. No thought was given to the comparatively minor Salt Clay Creek, a mile or two further on.

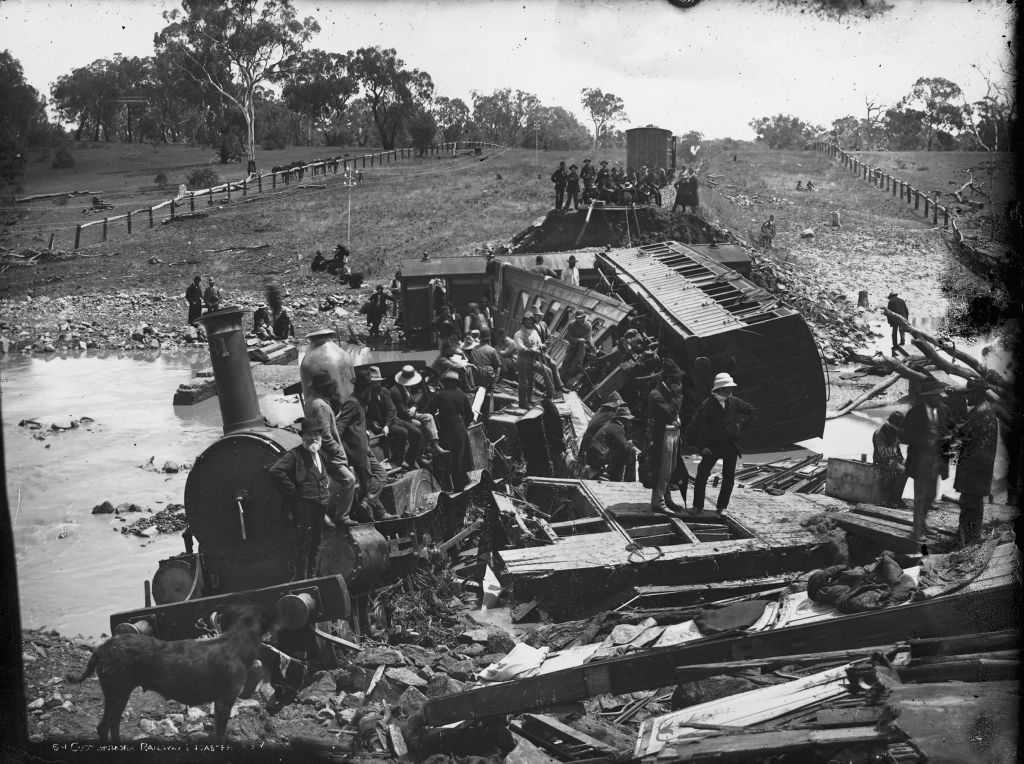
Salt Clay Creek railway accident

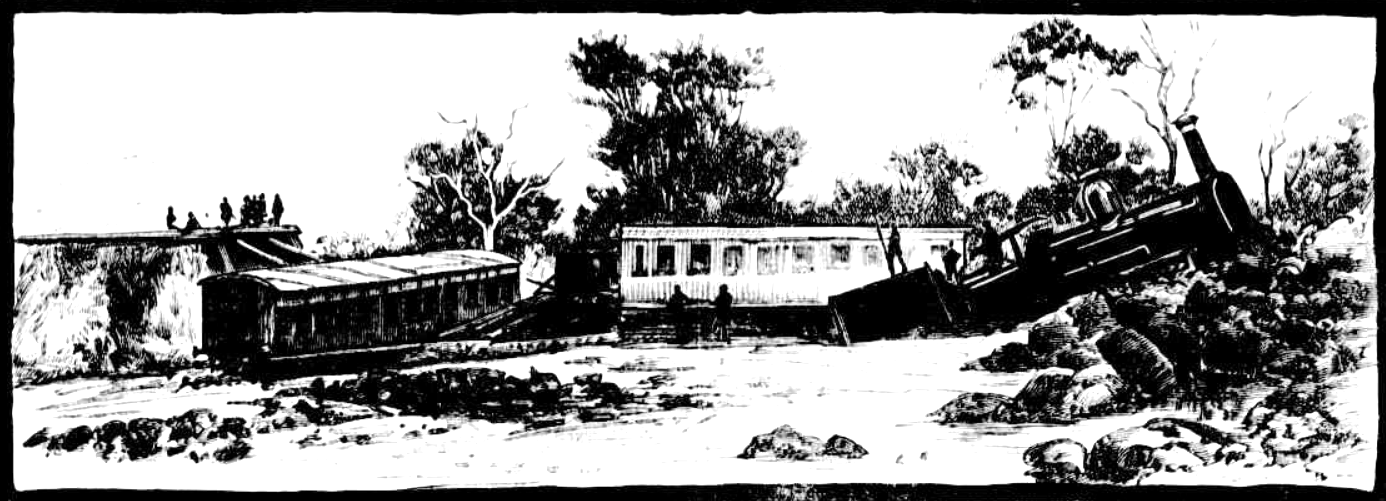
Artist's view of the wreckage

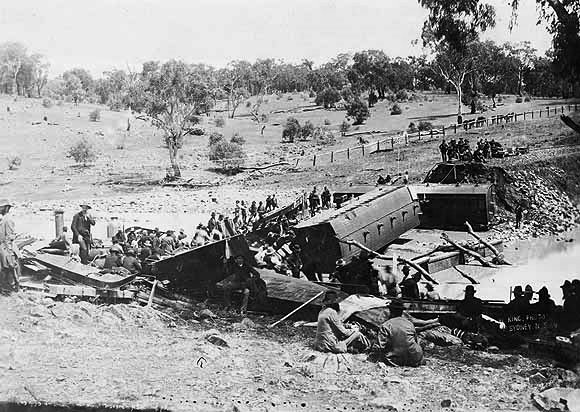
This photo best shows damage to the embankment

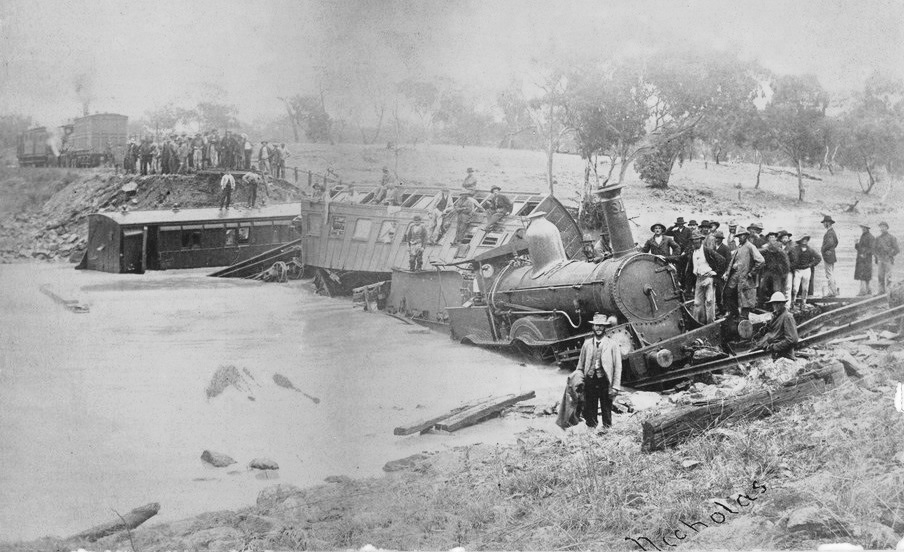
The Nicholas photograph (Note: Goulburn photographer George Henry Nicholas (c. 1857–1912), who had a studio in Cootamundra at the time, was the first photographer on the scene, and did good business selling prints, but was distressed to find that pirated reproductions were being hawked widely. He may be responsible for other photographs reproduced here, but this one bears his name.)

In Cootamundra that afternoon, George Hawke, a one-time sailor and then a bricklayer who had worked with the perway team, became aware of the danger posed to the train by flooded lines, and with his mate James Hicks set off towards Bethungra. They traversed Mullaly's creek on hands and knees, grasping the line, prepared to warn the train, crossing the creek around 19:20, his progress being watched by Cambourne, high on the cliff. Unaware of the washaway at the Salt Clay Creek, they wasted valuable time removing logs from the line, and were only aware of their error when they heard the sound of the distant crash. In any case, they had progressed 74 chains [1,630 yards (1,500 m)] in the gloom and rain, with another two washaways and 35 chains [770 yards (700 m)] to the fatal spot, so reaching it before 19:45, when the crash occurred, was impossible.

The second-class carriage was destroyed. The sleeping car, in which most or all of the bookmaking party were playing "Nap", remained intact but fortuitously it was unroofed, otherwise many would have been trapped and drowned. Several of the "metallicians" worked heroically to rescue passengers, but Thompson, who was badly injured, declined to assist, saying he had enough trouble just saving himself. He was unstinting in his praise for the Cootamundra townspeople but would later criticise the Cootamundra doctors.

Having survived the derailment, guard Murray made it a matter of priority to stop the goods train which was known to be following half an hour behind. He trekked back along the line, bearing a red lantern and fog signals. He eventually reached Bethungra, where the goods train could be halted, and from where Traffic Inspector Roberts (Note: George J. Roberts was previously stationmaster at Bomen and at Wagga. He was elected mayor of Junee but forced to resign by the Railways as incompatible with his duties.) at Junee was telegraphed for an breakdown train.

Another account has him arresting the goods train, then somehow continuing (reversing?) to Bethungra.

Engine driver Moodie, nursing his injuries, proceeded along the line. Arriving at the second washaway, he saw the red lantern on the Cootamundra side of the stream and realised he could go no further, and that their hope of immediate assistance from that side was vain.

Hawke, having failed to intercept the train, returned to Cootamundra to enlist the aid of the town's medical doctors, Charles J. R. Combe (Note: Combe and a pharmacist attended promptly, Agassiz much later, around 02:00 on Monday. a source of some criticism. Charles John Rennie Combe married in 1884. He sold up and left Cootamundra early 1887, at Woolloomooloo proved insolvent, bankrupt 1889.) and Alfred Agassiz (1840–1910), then helped rescue the survivors, most of whom were accommodated at the Hotel Albion. Seven injured survivors, including the engine driver and fireman, were carried to John Hurley's homestead. One of Cobb and Co.'s coaches started out for the scene with volunteers, but had to turn back, as the ground was too soft. Joe LeSueur borrowed a horse and cart and was able to carry injured survivors back to Cootamundra, where a makeshift hospital was set up in Mark Solomon's Assembly Hall (also referred to as the School of Arts) in Parker Street; the dead were at first stored in the stables to the rear of the Hall. Rescuers were hampered by the rain, the darkness, and the boggy clay of the ground. Despite these difficulties, the response from the townspeople was immediate and ungrudging. The last to be extricated was William Stone, who arrived at the Assembly Hall at around 4:00 am. All sixteen mailbags were retrieved.

The breakdown train arrived at Bethungra, picking up guard Murray, and reached the scene around 02:30 on Monday, but there was little they could do but search downstream for bodies.

=== Fatalities and serious injuries ===
Those killed directly, drowned, or died of injuries were:

- Three railways employees:

- Alfred Wilson, train conductor, who was in the sleeping car, and
- John O'Dwyer, the mail guard, was trapped and drowned in the mail van. William Stone, the other occupant, was retrieved before he, too, drowned.
- Joseph Campey of Harden, a railways fireman, (Note: His son William Campey also became a railways officer.) returning home as a passenger.

- Mary Hodson, wife of John Hodson, a Wagga Wagga contractor or ironmonger
- William Bergin, a coach-driver from Carcoar, was badly injured, with both thighs broken, and died the following day. who was returning home with . . .
- his sister's nine-year-old son John Hade, whose parents kept the Royal Hotel, Carcoar.
- Henry "Harry" Holmes, possibly a brickmaker whose ticket was from Wagga to Cootamundra. (Note: A report that he was a pigeon-shooter who competed under the name "Perkins" was disproved. Earlier reports named that body as belonging to Robert Crawford, who was later found alive and not involved.)

A later history put the subsequent casualties at two, not named. William Bergin was one, but the second (if true) has yet to be found.

25 passengers were listed as injured, among them the train driver Andrew Charles Moodie, (died 1932) of Harden, who was crushed by weight of coal into a corner of the cab and badly scalded by steam. He was treated at Goulburn hospital, as were Austin Saqui and Israel Barnard, the most seriously injured of the bookmakers. William Stone, who was submerged for three hours with little more than his head above water, his thighs pinned by a heavy timber, lost the use of his legs.

=== Repatriating the wounded ===
On Tuesday 27 January the injured passengers were carried by the mail train from Bethungra to Harefield, a small station nine miles from Junee. Assisting them were Dr Woods, who had not been injured in the crash, also two hospital nurses, Joe Thompson's brother Jack, and Abe Schneider's wife Leah, who were among those who arrived from Melbourne by special train. Those returning to Melbourne included Thompson, Schneider, Zucker, Cohen, Jacobson, Haines, Harper, Patterson, Levy, O'Brien, Giles, and Barnett, accompanied by Woods, Jack Thompson and Schneider's wife Leah, and his brother — they had been on a northbound train, intent on helping the injured, then at some passing lane between Junee and Albury met the southbound train in which the bookmakers were passengers, so were able to change trains. Also on that train were Reuben and Lizzy Barnard who, learning of Barnard's whereabouts, changed plans and headed for Goulburn.

At Albury the passengers transferred to a Victorian Rail first-class carriage bound for Melbourne. Those wishing to continue their journey to Sydney were not so well catered for; they may have got seats on the next mail train.

== Later history ==
Express trains on the NSW line were cancelled temporarily but mail trains continued to operate, the passengers and mail being transferred by coach between Cootamundra and the Bethungra side of the crash scene.

Repairs to the line at Mullaly's Creek mile were completed by the following Thursday, and rails and sleepers were made available from the Gundagai extension project for a bypass around the two Salt Clay Creek gaps, and a bank engine supplied to provide extra traction. Additionally, a channel was blasted through solid rock on the northern side of the line to provide a bypass for the loop in the creek.

At the inquest, at which Joseph Harper was a valuable witness, the government was found liable for the accident by virtue of the culvert design. John Whitton, Engineer-in-Chief for Railway Construction, dissented, citing the 1879 flood, when the culvert handled a similar downpour with equanimity, and blamed bursting dams for the damage: Hurley's dam on Mullaley's creek, some 400m from the crash site, burst around 17:35 on the day of the crash; two other dams on Salt Clay Creek, directly above the crash site, burst around 18:00.

Another hearing resulted from a writ by passenger George Adams against the Railway commissioners. It concluded on 2 July 1885, finding for the commissioners.

Following these hearings, George Hawke was awarded £50, a silver watch, and an offer of employment as a ganger with the NSW railways, in recognition of his efforts. He declined the job offer.

Two years later a similar unprecedented flood undermined the track on the Sydney side of Illabo, not 30 km distant, also on a Sunday, but was discovered by fettlers before the mail train was due.

== Gallery ==
These photographs depict the current site. There are now two culverts: a brick-faced culvert of around 2.4 by 2.4 metres (7 ft 10 in × 7 ft 10 in), and a secondary one, plain concrete, around 1.5 by 2.0 metres (4 ft 11 in × 6 ft 7 in), 100 metres (330 ft) to the east. The line, of course, bears little resemblance to the original, being now two continuous welded tracks on concrete sleepers, but the route is unchanged.

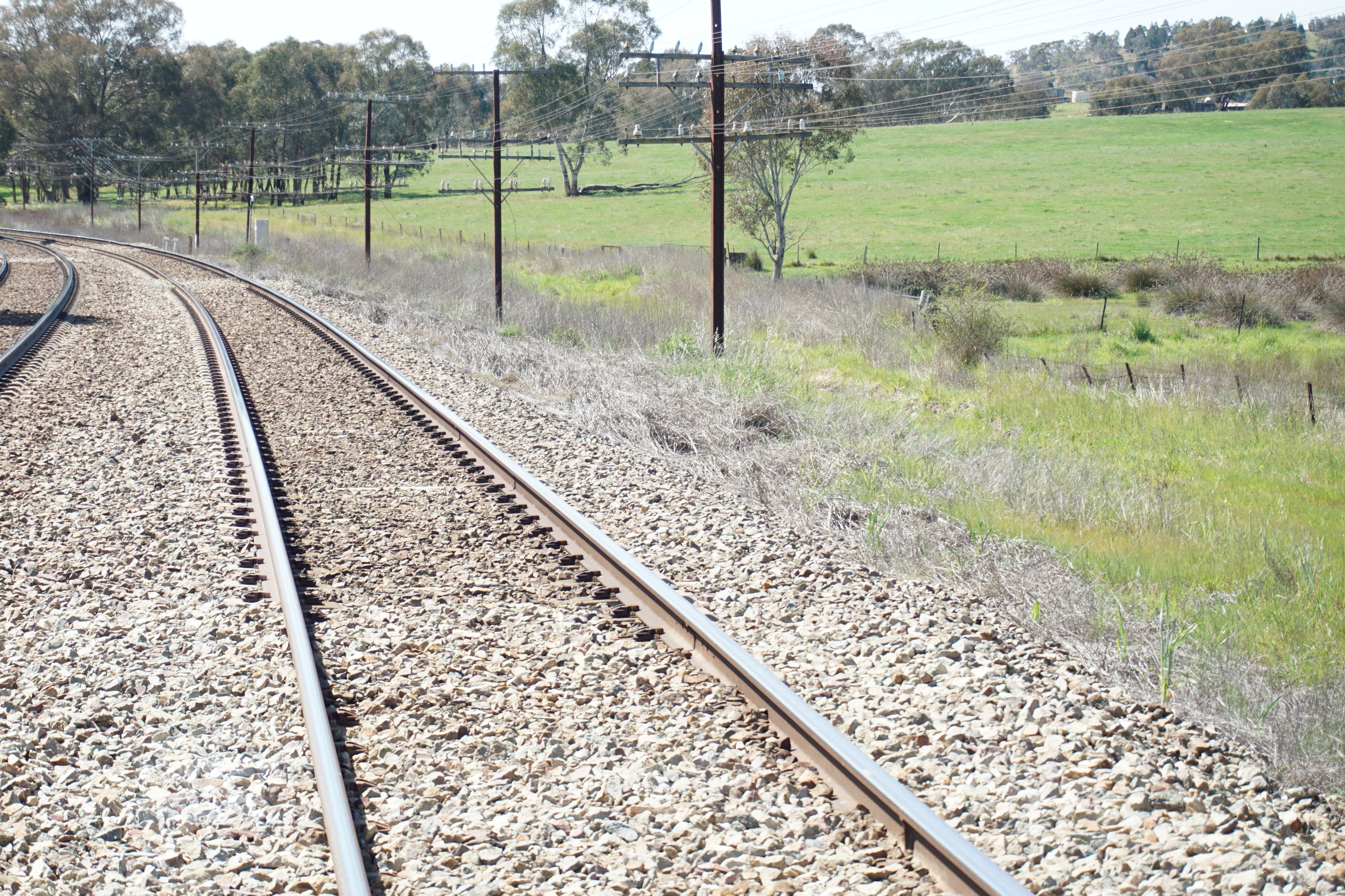
Approaching Salt Clay Creek

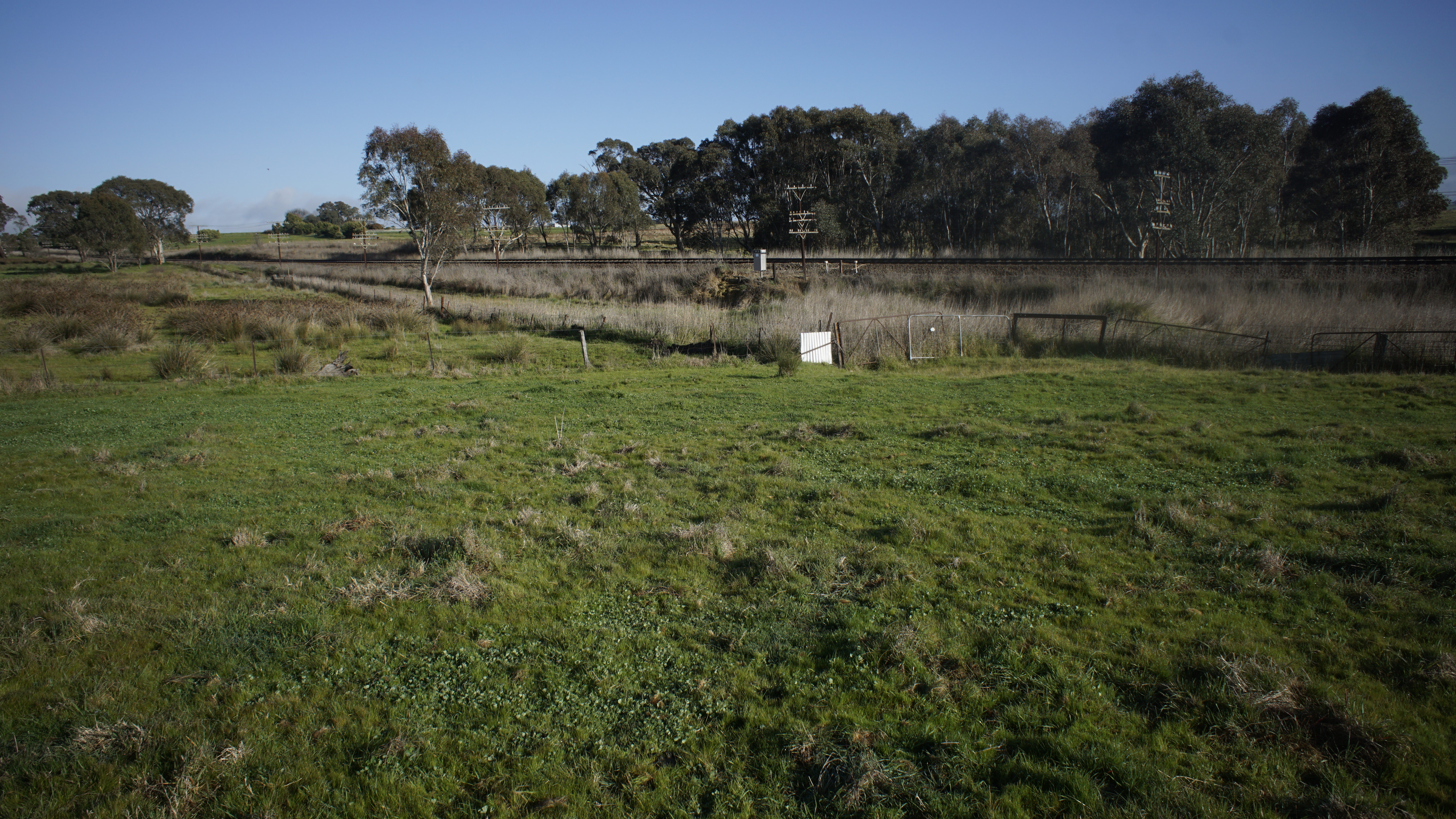
Scene of the crash

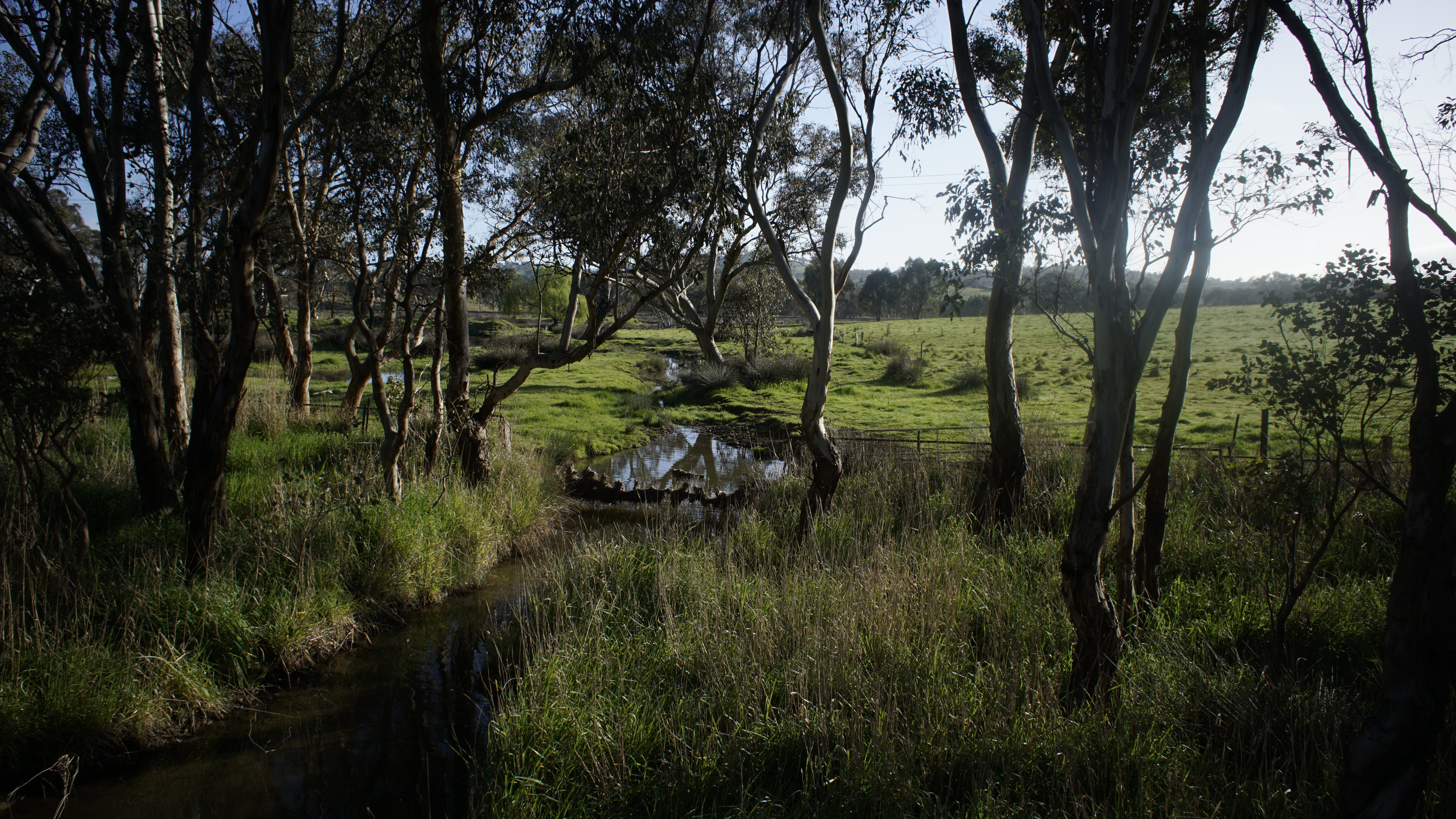
Creek near Dirnaseer Road

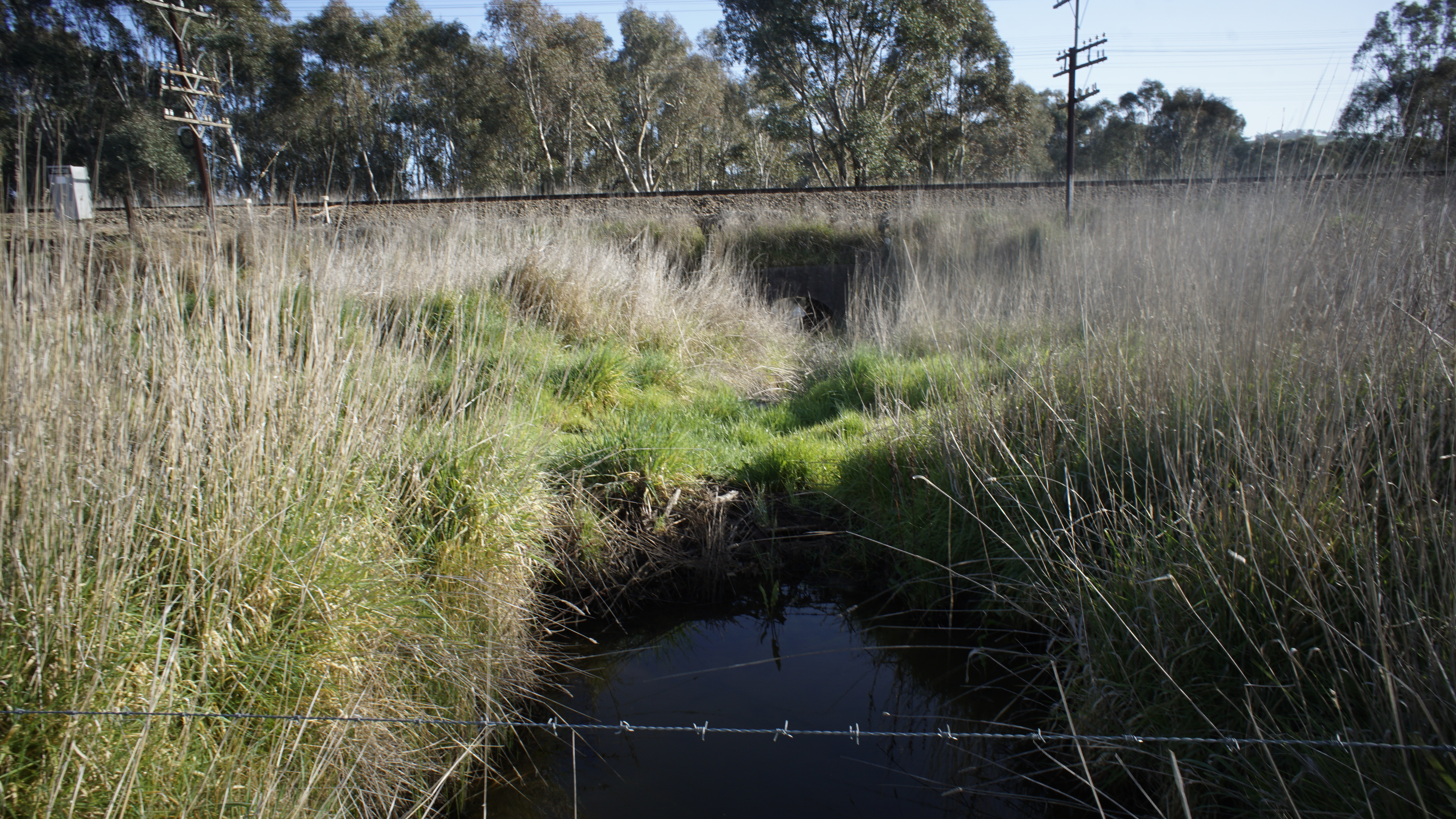
Culvert, mostly hidden by grass

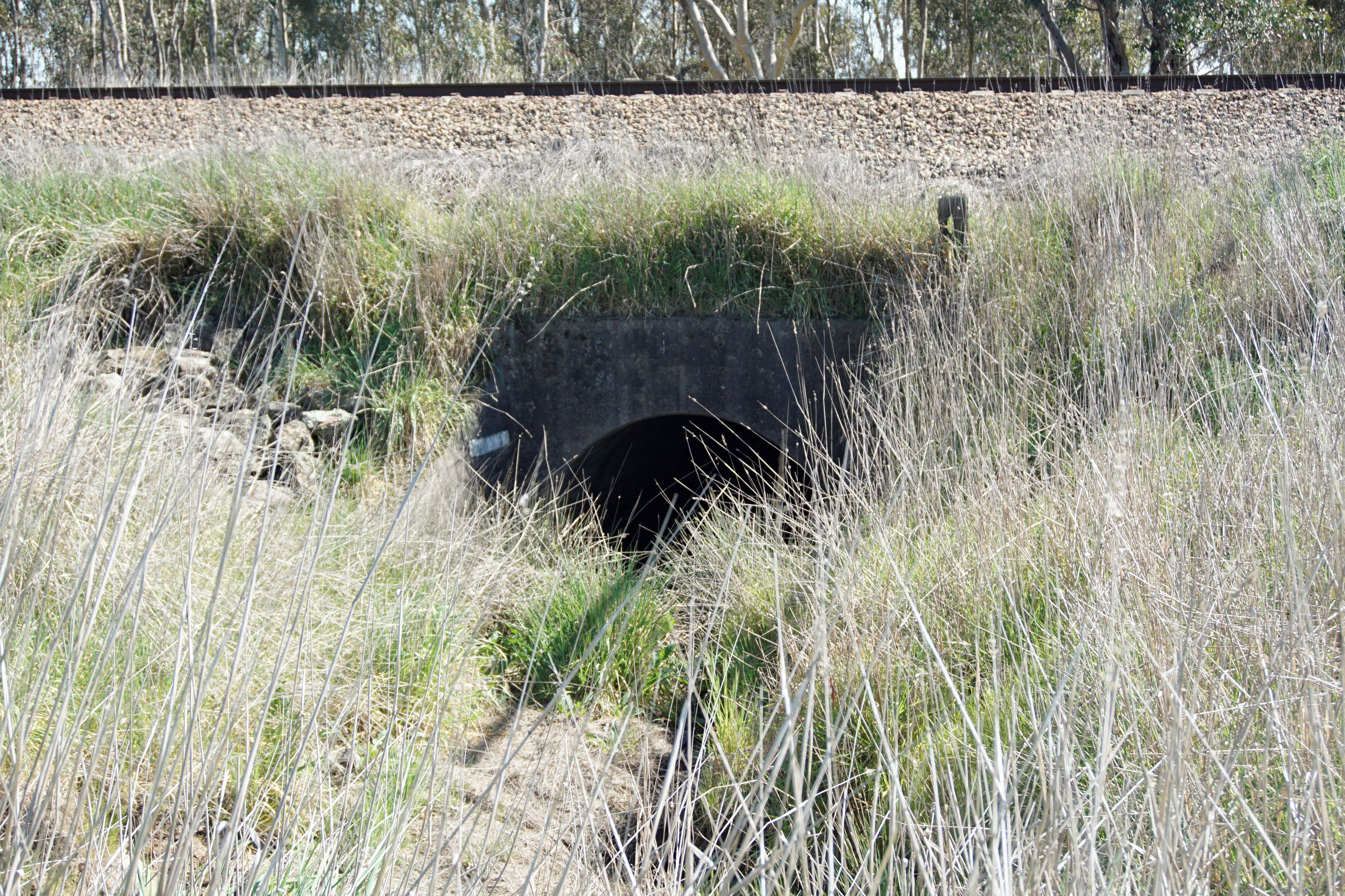
South side of culvert

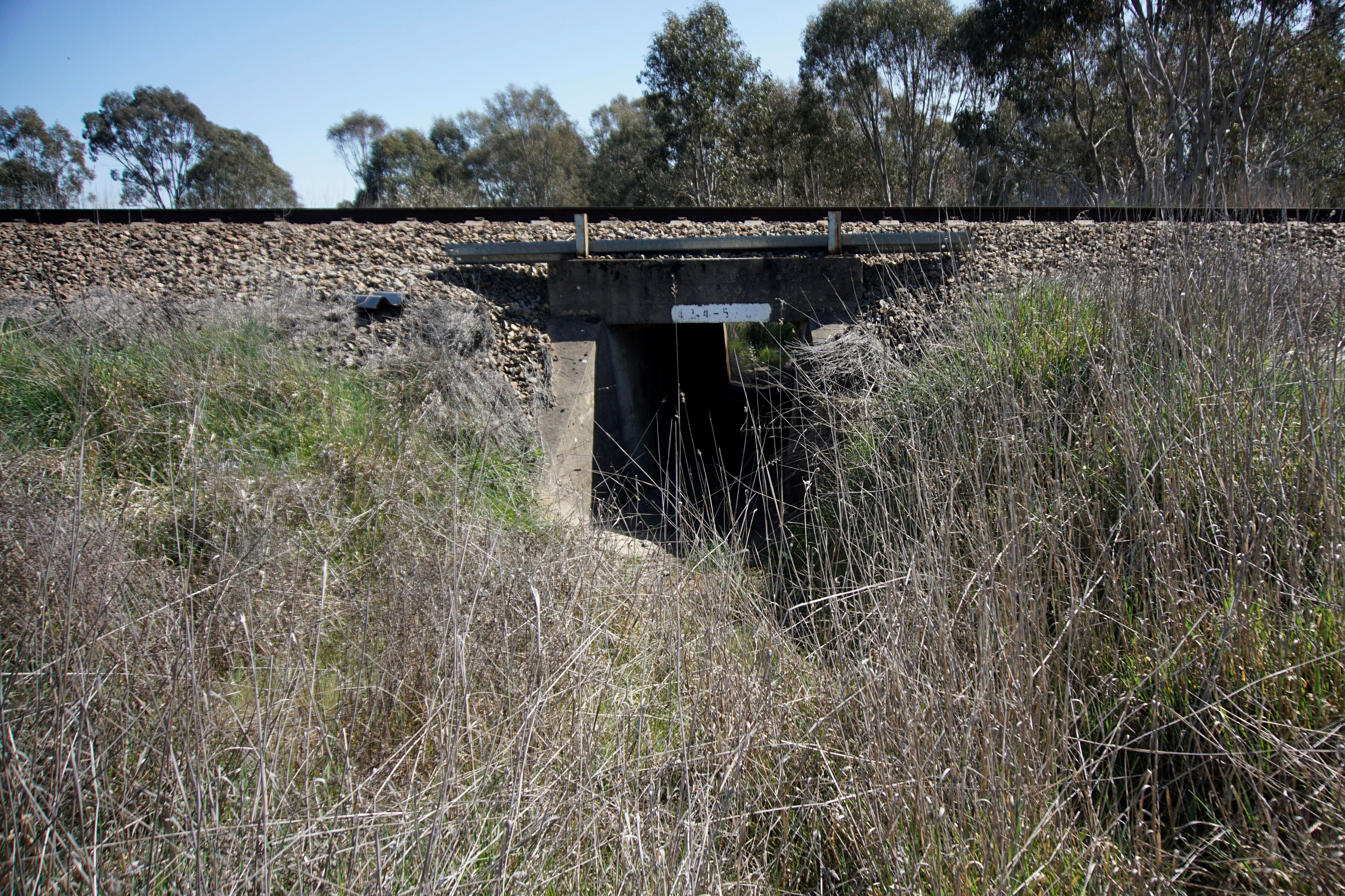
South side of tunnel

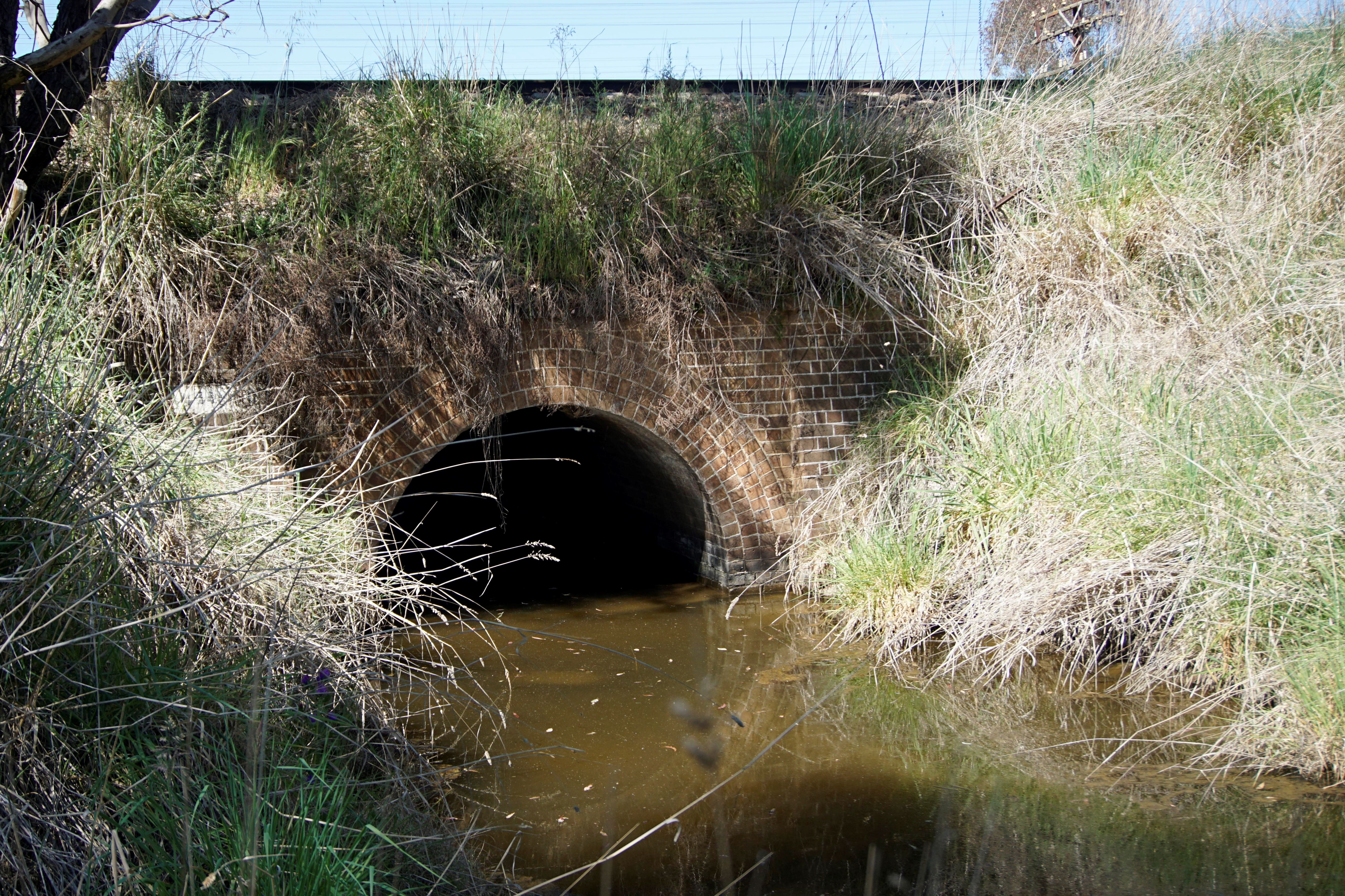
North side of culvert

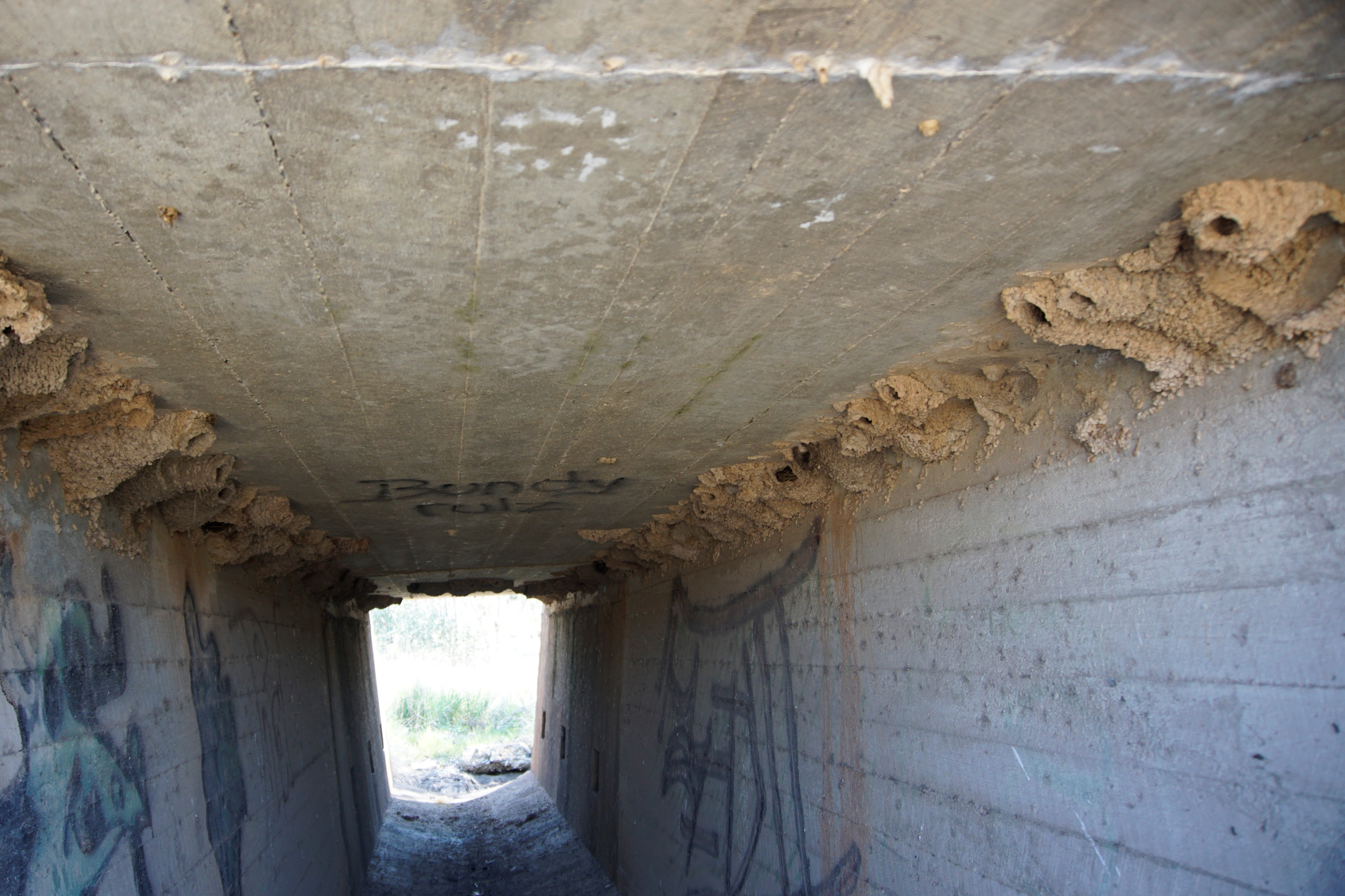
Inside the tunnel, looking south

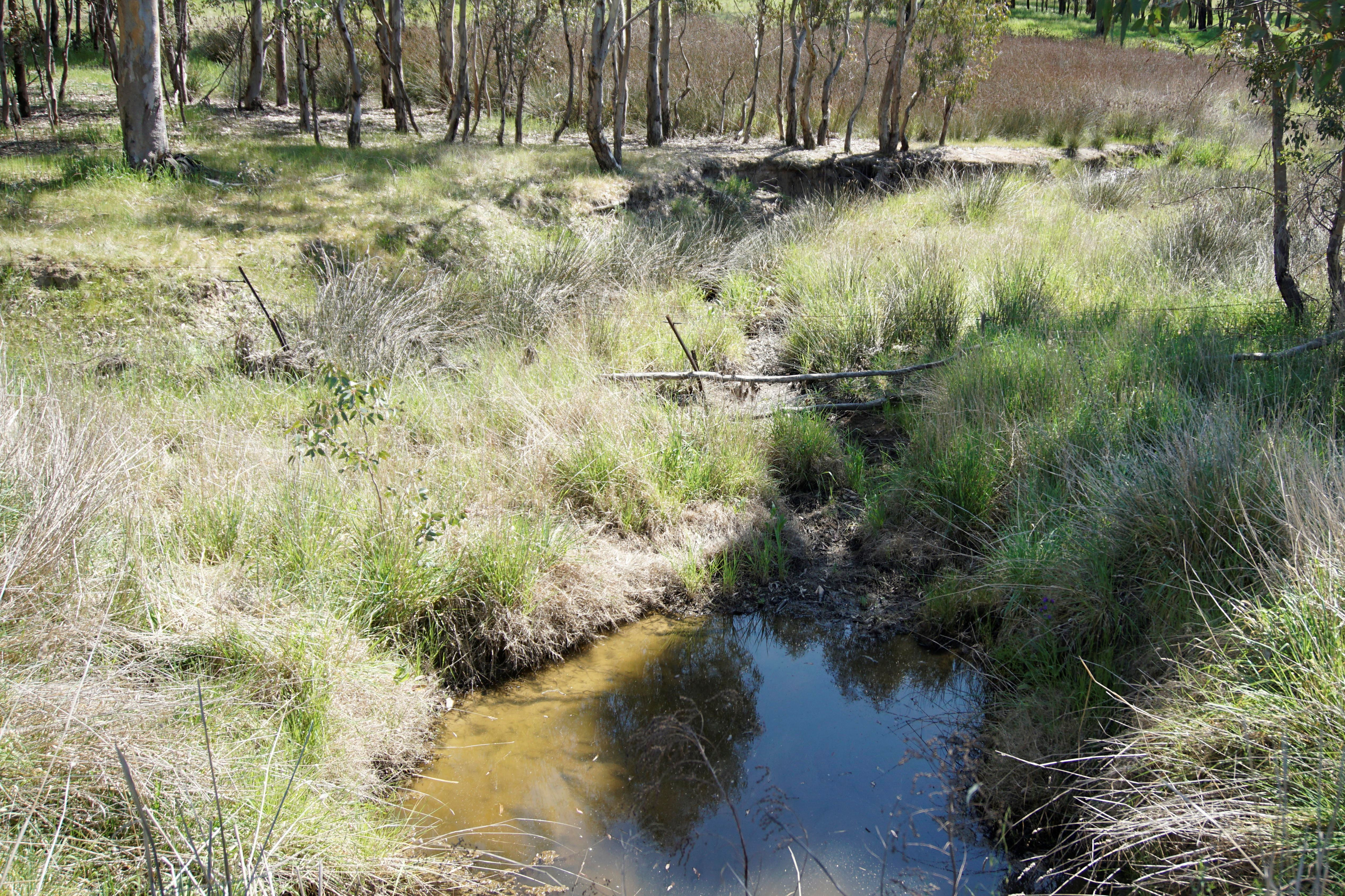
Downstream from the culvert

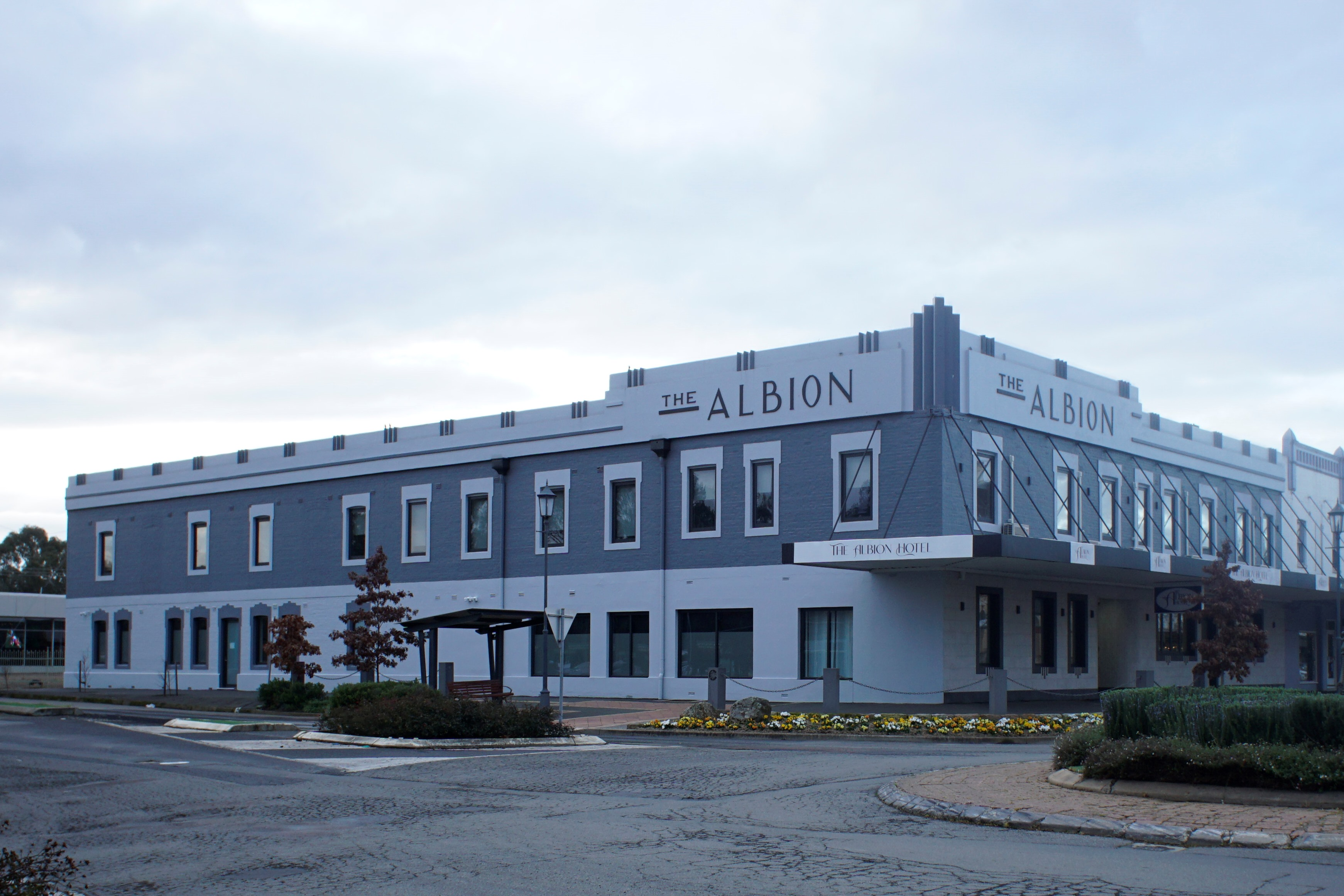
Hotel Albion, Cootamundra
