= The Quack (horse) =

Australian-bred Thoroughbred racehorse

- Sire: Peter Wilkins (GB)
- Grandsire: The Flying Dutchman (GB)
- Dam: Quickstep (AUS)
- Damsire: Lugar (GB)
- Sex: Stallion
- Foaled: 1866
- Country: Australia
- Colour: Bay
- Owner: John Tait
- Trainer: John Tait

Major wins
- Melbourne Cup (1872) Bendigo Cup (1872) Governors Plate (1873)
- Last updated on 1 November 2018

The Quack was an Australian bred Thoroughbred racehorse that won the 1872 Melbourne Cup.

The Quack was the half brother of the 1870 Melbourne Cup winner Nimblefoot, with both horses being from the same broodmare, Quickstep (AUS). In 1873, The Quack defeated Nimblefoot in the Governor’s Plate at Flemington. He also won the Bendigo Cup in 1872.

The Quack was the fourth and final success in the Melbourne Cup for owner and trainer John Tait.
