= Don Juan (horse) =

Australian thoroughbred racehorse

- Sire: Lucifer
- Grandsire: Gemma di Vergy
- Dam: Levity
- Damsire: Kingston
- Sex: Stallion
- Foaled: 1869
- Died: 1874
- Country: Australia
- Colour: Bay
- Breeder: John Baker
- Owner: Joe Thompson
- Trainer: James Wilson
- Jockey: William Wilson
- Record: 7: 6–0–0

Major wins
- Melbourne Cup (1873); Royal Park Stakes (1873); Flemington Plate (1873)

Don Juan (foaled 1869) was an Australian bred thoroughbred racehorse who is most notable for winning the 1873 Melbourne Cup.

== Background ==
Don Juan was bred by South Australian politician and pastoralist John Baker. Baker then sold the horse to his eventual trainer James Wilson for £50. The ownership of Don Juan caused much controversy, with the listed owner being Mr W. Johnstone. It was revealed however that Johnstone simply allowed his name to be used, and the horse was actually owned by bookmaker Joe "Leviathan" Thompson.

== Racing career ==
On 23 May 1872, Don Juan made his racing debut as a two-year-old at Morphettville. He finished unplaced over the distance of 12 furlongs (2,400m).

Don Juan did not race as a three-year-old but was still nominated for the 1873 Melbourne Cup as a maiden. This allowed the horse to be allotted a low weight of 6st 12 lb (43.5 kg).

On 7 November 1873, Don Juan started the 3/1 favourite in the Melbourne Cup and won by 3.5 lengths in a then record time for the race of 3:36.00. Days after the race protesters had made allegations against Don Juan and his win in the Melbourne Cup. The complaint was that Don Juan had been nominated and entered into the Melbourne Cup as a four year old, however was apparently over the age of four. The Victoria Racing Club found the allegations to be untrue.

A day after winning the Melbourne Cup, Don Juan was successful in the Royal Park Stakes at Flemington. The next day he won the Flemington Plate over a distance of 24 furlongs (4,800m). Don Juan raced once more on the 1 January 1874 when successful in the VRC Canterbury Plate over 20 furlongs (4,000m).

In February 1874, Don Juan was on a training gallop at St Albans Park, Victoria when he suffered soreness and blood was noticed in his nostrils. He was returned to his stall and reportedly died suddenly. An autopsy revealed internal bleeding and the cause of death was due to an inch long rent found in his heart.

== Pedigree ==
Pedigree of Don Juan (AUS) 1869
Sire Lucifer (IRE) 1860	Gemma di Vergy (GB); 1854	Sir Hercules*	Whalebone*
Sire Lucifer (IRE) 1860	Gemma di Vergy (GB); 1854	Sir Hercules*	Peri
Sire Lucifer (IRE) 1860	Gemma di Vergy (GB); 1854	Snowdrop	Heron
Sire Lucifer (IRE) 1860	Gemma di Vergy (GB); 1854	Snowdrop	Fairy
Sire Lucifer (IRE) 1860	Peri (IRE); 1848	Birdcatcher	Sir Hercules*
Sire Lucifer (IRE) 1860	Peri (IRE); 1848	Birdcatcher	Guiccioli
Sire Lucifer (IRE) 1860	Peri (IRE); 1848	Perdita	Langar
Sire Lucifer (IRE) 1860	Peri (IRE); 1848	Perdita	Delenda
Dam Levity (GB) 1860	Kingston (GB); 1848	Venison	Partisan
Dam Levity (GB) 1860	Kingston (GB); 1848	Venison	Fawn
Dam Levity (GB) 1860	Kingston (GB); 1848	Queen Anne	Slane
Dam Levity (GB) 1860	Kingston (GB); 1848	Queen Anne	Garcia
Dam Levity (GB) 1860	Frolic (GB); 1848	Touchstone	Camel*
Dam Levity (GB) 1860	Frolic (GB); 1848	Touchstone	Banter
Dam Levity (GB) 1860	Frolic (GB); 1848	The Saddler Mare	The Saddler
Dam Levity (GB) 1860	Frolic (GB); 1848	The Saddler Mare	Stays*

* Don Juan is inbred 3S x 4S to the stallion Sir Hercules, meaning that he appears third generation and fourth generation on the sire side of his pedigree.

* Don Juan is inbred 4S x 5S x 5D x 5D to the stallion Whalebone, meaning that he appears fourth generation once and fifth generation once (via Sir Hercules) on the sire side of his pedigree, and fifth generation twice (via Camel and Stays) on the dam side of his pedigree.
