= Jack Anwin =

Australian jockey

Personal information
- Born: 5 June 1867 Collingwood, Victoria, Australia
- Died: 13 August 1956 (aged 89) Caulfield, Victoria, Australia
- Resting place: Springvale, Victoria, Australia
- Occupation: Jockey

Horse racing career
- Sport: Horse racing

Major racing wins
- Melbourne Cup (1889)

John Anwin (5 June 1867 in Collingwood, Victoria – 13 August 1956 in Caulfield, Victoria) was an Australian jockey who was best known for riding Bravo to victory in the 1889 Melbourne Cup. Jack and his two brothers, Sam and George, were notable for taking the first three places in two races on 18 July 1903 in Boulder, Western Australia. He is buried in Springvale, Victoria.
