= 1875 Melbourne Cup =

Annual horse race in Melbourne, Victoria

- Melbourne Cup
- Location: Flemington Racecourse
- Date: 9 November 1875
- Distance: 2 miles
- Winning horse: Wollomai
- Winning time: 3:38.0
- Final odds: 16/1
- Jockey: Robert Batty
- Trainer: Stephen Moon
- Owner: John Cleeland
- Surface: Turf
- Attendance: ≈100,000

The 1875 Melbourne Cup was a two-mile handicap horse race which took place on Tuesday, 9 November 1875.

This year was the fifteenth running of the Melbourne Cup. This would be the first year of the race being held on a Tuesday. The day was a declared public holiday in Victoria in recognition of the 34th birthday of the then Prince of Wales Edward.

There were 29 runners that had declared to run in the race, with Imperial and Kingsborough the favoured horses in early betting. The top-weighted horse was John Tait's Goldsborough, who had finished seventh the previous year. 1874 Melbourne Cup winner Haricot was expected to run well again, although stable-mate Nimrod was more fancied. Following its win in the Victoria Derby, John Tait's horse Melbourne was the subject of many bets, more so than the horse it defeated in heavy conditions in that race, Richmond.

A total of 20 runners made their way to the start after a number of horses were withdrawn on race day, including two nameless colts owned by Etienne de Mestre. (Note: One of the colts known as the "Sylvia colt" won at short odds the Maiden Plate, the race before the Melbourne Cup.) The weather for the race day was overcast and windy, and showers began as the field made their way to the start. Goldsborough and Nimrod had the best of the start, with Polidori racing to the front before the first turn. Down the back straight, Nimrod bolted interfering with Sterling, and by the time the horses approached the mile marker Polidori had run its race and started to drop backwards. Goldsborough led the field for a time, but it was Coquette that would lead at the final turn. On the Flemington straight, Coquette wasn't able to hold off Goldsborough, but it was Wollomai that galloped clear to win by two lengths, Richmond rushed home past tiring runners to claim second place by some distance from Goldsborough in third. Bringing up the rear of the field were Calumny, Mohican and Calaba.

Wollomai was a surprise winner, having not been featured in much of the pre-race chatter, with observers suggesting the horse was "too fat" and lacking fitness to cover the two miles. Trainer Stephen Moon had taken over the preparation of the horse just months before the Cup after the horse was transferred from William Lang. Wollomai was owned by John Cleeland who operated the Albion Hotel on Bourke Street, the hub of operations for Cobb & Co coaches. Cleeland at the time raced his horses under the alias Mr H. Sharpe. He had previously won the Australian Cup with Shenandoah in 1868. Cleeland would later name his homestead on Phillip Island after the horse. Before its win in the Melbourne Cup, Wollomai had won the 1875 Midsummer Handicap on New Year's Day at Flemington and won two races at Warrnambool including the 1875 Warrnambool Cup.

The winning jockey was Scottish-born Robert Batty who was 20-years-old when he won the Melbourne Cup, having won the inaugural Newmarket Handicap on board Maid of Avenel in 1874.

It was estimated that there were 100,000 spectators at Flemington Racecourse, far exceeding the number from previous years, although a notable absentee for the time was the Acting-Governor of Victoria, Sir William Stawell.

== Full results ==
This is the list of placegetters for the 1875 Melbourne Cup.

Place	Horse	Age Gender	Jockey	Weight	Trainer	Owner	Odds	Margin
1	Wollomai	6y h	Robert Batty	7 st 8 lb (48.1 kg)	Sam Harding	John Cleeland (Note: Listed under the alias Mr H. Sharpe in contemporary references.)	16/1	2 lengths
2	Richmond	3y c	George Williams	6 st 3 lb (39.5 kg)		Eli Jellett	16/1	4 lengths
3	Goldsborough	5y h	Jimmy Ashworth	9 st 9 lb (61.2 kg)	John Tait	John Tait	10/1	
4	Loquacity	3y f	John Kilduff (Note: Also known as Jack Kilduff)	5 st 9 lb (35.8 kg)	Tom Jordan	Gabriel Bennett	50/1	
5	Coquette	4y m	W. Howard	6 st 7 lb (41.3 kg)		Mr W. McKenzie	33/1	
6	Imperial	6y g	Joe Morrison	8 st 4 lb (52.6 kg)		William Samuel Cox	3/1 fav.	
7	Dilke	4y h	Sam Cracknell	6 st 2 lb (39.0 kg)		Mr G. Atkinson	10/1	
8	Kingsborough	4y h	William Yeomans	8 st 11 lb (55.8 kg)		Hercules Robinson	5/1	
9	Kincrachnie	Aged m	W. McLeod	6 st 3 lb (39.5 kg)		Mr D. McLellan	14/1	
—N/a	Sterling	4y h	M. Bryan	8 st 7 lb (54.0 kg)		Thomas Ivory	16/1	
—N/a	Melbourne	4y h	H. Grubb	8 st 6 lb (53.5 kg)	John Tait	John Tait	20/1	
—N/a	Haricot	5y g	Lynch	8 st 2 lb (51.7 kg)		Thomas Chirnside & Andrew Chirnside	14/1	
—N/a	Scanmag	4y h	McInnes	7 st 12 lb (49.9 kg)		Mr G. Livingstone	20/1	
—N/a	Nimrod	6y g	Green	7 st 2 lb (45.4 kg)		Thomas Chirnside & Andrew Chirnside	20/1	
—N/a	West Australian	5y h	Cleary	6 st 10 lb (42.6 kg)		Thomas Ivory	20/1	
—N/a	Kingfisher	Aged g	Ridley	6 st 4 lb (39.9 kg)		Andrew Town	7/1	
—N/a	Polidori	4y h	Hummerston	6 st 4 lb (39.9 kg)		James Edward Warby	20/1	
—N/a	Calumny (NZL)	6y m	H. Lewis	9 st 3 lb (58.5 kg)		Mr J.B. Wallis	50/1	
—N/a	Mohican	4y g	Harden	6 st 2 lb (39.0 kg)		Mr S.P. Winter	50/1	
Last	Calaba	6y h	Snarey	6 st 12 lb (43.5 kg)		Sam Waldock	50/1	
SCR	Dante	5y h	—N/a	8 st 2 lb (51.7 kg)	William Filgate	William Filgate	—N/a	
SCR	Benjiroo	7y h	—N/a	7 st 3 lb (45.8 kg)		William Samuel Cox	—N/a	
SCR	Burwood	5y h	—N/a	7 st 0 lb (44.5 kg)		Mr W. Archer	—N/a	
SCR	The Deer	Aged g	—N/a	6 st 4 lb (39.9 kg)		Mr J.S. Solomon	—N/a	
SCR	Maid Of All Work	3y f	—N/a	6 st 4 lb (39.9 kg)		James Wilson	—N/a	
SCR	Ivanhoe	6y g	—N/a	6 st 3 lb (39.5 kg)		Mr R. Fulton	—N/a	
SCR	The Painter	3y c	—N/a	6 st 0 lb (38.1 kg)		Charles Brown Fisher	—N/a	

== Prizemoney ==
First prize £1265, second prize £50, third prize £20.

== See also ==
- Melbourne Cup
- List of Melbourne Cup winners
- Victoria Racing Club
