= William Samuel Cox =

Australian horse racing pioneer

William Samuel (W.S.) Cox (1831–1895) was a pioneer of Thoroughbred racing in Australia. He opened his first venture, Kensington Park Racecourse, in 1874, which operated until 1882. He founded the Moonee Valley Racing Club in 1883, on land he leased the previous year. The Cox Plate, a prestigious Group 1 horse racing event, that has been held annually at the Moonee Valley Racecourse, Melbourne in October since 1922, is named after him.

Other members of Cox's family to contribute to Australian racing include his sons A. H. (Archie) Cox, who became club secretary; and W. S. Cox Jr., a successful amateur jockey and trainer; the latter's son William Stanley Cox; and his son, William Murray Cox. The family, who have been involved in the administration of racing for nearly 120 years, were collectively inducted into the Australian Racing Hall of Fame en bloc in 2006.
