= Joe Thompson (bookmaker) =

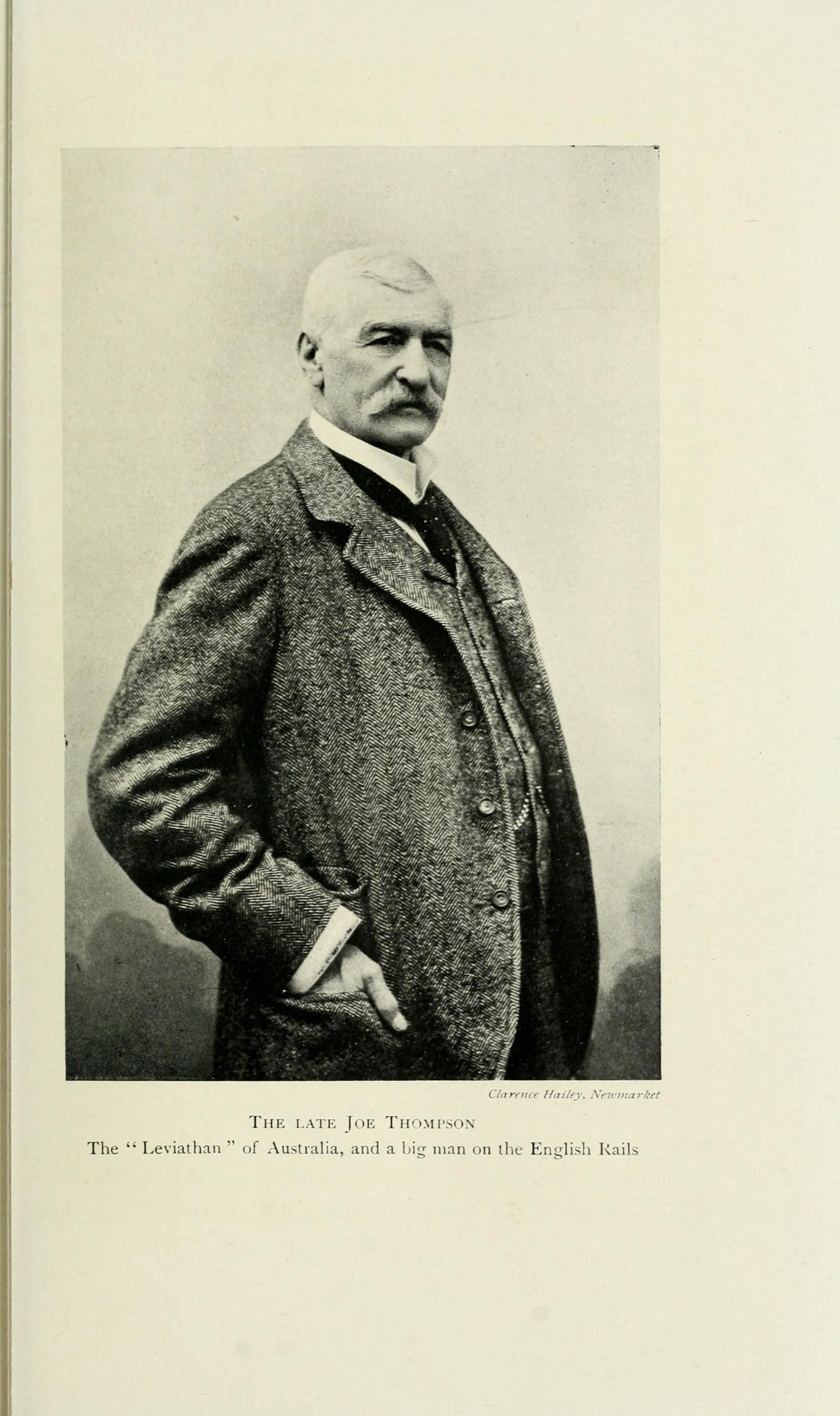
Photograph of Joe Thompson (published in Sharps, flats, gamblers, and racehorses by A. Dick Luckman.

Joseph Thompson, born Joseph Solomon (6 March 1838 – 3 March 1909) "King of the Ring" "The Leviathan", was a bookmaker in Melbourne, Victoria, and later in London, England.

== History ==
Thompson was born in London to tobacco merchant Samuel T. Solomon. and his wife Jessie Solomon, née Levi.

Stories about his early days in Australia are often contradictory and impossible to pin down. In one version he first arrived in 1852 aboard a ship named Soldarha, Soldanha or Salanha, none of which can be confirmed. In an interview with Ernest Whitington ("Rufus" of The Register), he arrived in 1854 as an apprentice seaman, and "jumped ship" by hiding in an empty water barrel for 36 hours before being unloaded at Sandridge pier. He went to the diggings but the anticipated "gold for the picking" failed to materialise, and he returned to the sea for another three years, serving out his apprenticeship. He again sailed to Melbourne and this time found a little gold at Ararat, enough to set himself up in 1857 as a small-time bookmaker.

Only fools back horses, sir; wise men turn bookmakers and lay 'em, and there are a thousand fools for every wise man. So you see, sir, there's plenty of business for me and such as me.

In those days there were four big bookmakers: Thomas Coker, Tom Bavin, "the morose" Boole and Fred Goyder, who guarded their monopoly jealously. To enter the "ring", Thompson would have to gain membership of Tattersall's Club, (Note: George John Watson (1831–1906) conducted a Tattersall's, where wagers were settled, at Kirk's Horse Bazaar, 49 Bourke Street west; then from 1878 conducted by William Patrick Bowes (1835–1879) at his Australian Hotel, opposite Kirk's Bazaar; "Bowes's Tattersall's Club" continued under that name into the 1920s.) but was blackballed three times. It has not been suggested that this was on account of his Jewish ancestry, but must remain a possibility. (Note: He never repudiated his family name; in newspaper "Family Notices" he identified himself as Solomon or Solomon-Thompson.) He was finally elected thanks to the support of Captain Standish.

Thompson was for a period a successful owner; horses he either owned openly or had interests in, included King of the Ring, Argus Scandal, Don Juan (winner of the 1873 Melbourne Cup), Romula, St Albans and Mentor, all trained by James Wilson.

He was one of a party of bookmakers in the train wrecked in the Salt Clay Creek railway disaster of 25 January 1885, when seven passengers lost their lives, though none in their carriage. At the time expressing his gratitude to the people from Cootamundra who came to their aid under appalling conditions, he was later highly critical.

=== Back in England ===
In 1889, at the top of the racing game and one of the wealthiest men in Australia, and with the possible exception of Alfred Joseph, the richest bookmaker, Thompson left for England and pastures new. He certainly found no welcome among the bookmaking fraternity there and was palmed off with "upper crust" customers who considered payment of debts rather below their station. He did eventually find his feet, and if he did not greatly increase his wealth, he did not fail either, and came to be known as one of the leaders of the ring. When a rumour arose impugning his ability to honour large debts, a wealthy South Australian W. K. Simms poo-poohed the notion. He did a lot of travelling back and forth across the Channel as an outlet for his indomitable energy, but it could not last forever. He made one last trip to South Africa for his health and died at Funchal, Madeira on his way back to England.

== Family ==
Thompson married Rose Maria Barnett (died March 1912), on 12 February 1868. She was a daughter of John Barnett (c. 1816 – 16 April 1878) and sister of bookmaker Oscar Barnett. Their children were:

- Leah Thompson (6 January 1869 – c. 1930) was a talented singer, admitted as a student of the Royal Academy of Music in 1890, married Ernest Lawrence Windover of the Windover Carriage Company in 1891.
- John Thompson (6 September 1870 – )
- daughter (2 September 1871 – )
- daughter (23 July 1876 – ) premature

They had a home "Don Juan" at Albert Street, East Melbourne

His brothers Phineas (died 4 July 1900), John ("Jack", died 13 April 1890), Barnett ("Barney") and Harry Thompson, were all bookmakers for a time.
