= James Wilson (horse trainer) =

James "Old Jim" Wilson (26 December 1828 – November 1917) was a racehorse trainer in Victoria, Australia, founder of the historic St Albans Stud in Geelong, and trainer of the 1873 Melbourne Cup winner Don Juan and 1876 winner Briseis. His older son James Wilson, Jr. (c. 1856 – 16 November 1935) captained the Geelong Football Club and as "Young Jim Wilson" trained 1899 Cup winner Merriwee. His younger son William Wilson (c. 1859 – 3 May 1890) was the jockey who rode Don Juan to victory in the 1873 Cup.

== History ==
Wilson was born in Yorkshire and emigrated to Victoria in 1845, and was for a while engaged at Deep Creek, looking after a horse named Paul Jones. He moved to the Hamilton district, where he was involved in horseracing, and won the Great Western Steeplechase in 1859 and 1860. He brought Musidora and Ebor to Melbourne in 1862, and ran them in the 1862 Melbourne Cup, Musidora coming second to Archer. She also ran in the Melbourne Cups of 1864, 1865 and 1866, and was the dam of Briseis. Ebor was owned by Captain Lyons who raced as "J. C. James"; Wilson took her to Adelaide, where she won the 1865 Adelaide Cup. He trained Lapdog for J. Gilbert which ran a close second to Nimblefoot in the 1870 Melbourne Cup. He had another close second the following year with Romula for Joe "Leviathan" "King of the Ring" Thompson.

Wilson and Adam Lindsay Gordon were great friends, but in the saddle serious rivals in cross-country races in the Western Districts of Victoria. When Gordon gave up racing he gave his last saddle to Wilson's son James Wilson, Jr.

In 1872 Wilson founded St. Albans stud at Breakwater, a suburb of Geelong and the (now heritage-listed) homestead designed by James T. Conlan in the neighbouring suburb of Whittington was completed the following year. Within a few years He had made it the best known stable in Australia.

Notable races won by horses trained by Wilson at St. Albans included:

- Ascot Vale Stakes: King of the Ring (1872); Maid of All Work (1875); First King (1877); Petrea (1879); and Royal Maid (1881).
- Australian Cup: Gasworks (1869), with jockey Joe Carter; Protos (1874); First King (1878); and Savanaka (1879)
- Caulfield Cup: Little Jack (1882)
- Champion Stakes: Romula (1871); First King (1878, 1880), his own horse.
- Doncaster Handicap: Briseis (1876)
- Maribyrnong Plate: Argus Scandal (1871); Dagmar (1872); Maid of All Work (1874)
- Melbourne Cup: Don Juan (1873) for bookmaker Joe "Leviathan" Thompson; Briseis (1876), until 1895 the only mare to win the Cup.
- VRC Oaks: My Dream (1868) for J. Moffatt; Sunshine (1872); Maid of All Work (1875); Briseis (1876); Pardon (1877); Melita (1878); Petrea (1879), owned by Sir William J. Clarke; Royal Maid (1881); and Nitre (1899)
- VRC St Leger: Gasworks (1869), with jockey Joe Carter; Seaspray (1874); First King (1878) and Caspian (1880)
- Sydney Cup: Mermaid (1871) for E. Twomey of Warrnambool; Savanaka (1879) for Herbert Power; Petrea (1880); and Progress (1881)
- Victoria Derby: My Dream (1869) for J. Moffatt; Miss Jessie (1871)

Tom Hales rode many of his winners, but the rider for the 1876 Melbourne Cup was Peter St. Albans, whose real name was Bowden.

One of the greatest patrons of his and his son's training stables was Herbert Power (1833–1919), for whom the Herbert Power Stakes was named.

The property and stables were in March 1886 sold to John Crozier, jun. (1843–1916) of South Australia for a reputed £37,000.

After making some improvements and bringing in a few good mares, Crozier in 1890 sold St. Albans for £70,000 to W. R. Wilson, the (unrelated) Broken Hill mining magnate, who installed C. Leslie Macdonald as manager.

Wilson then rented "Kingston estate" at Queenscliff, where he trained a small number of horses, including Nitre and Reaper. This stables would become the nucleus of his son James Wilson, Jr.'s stables "Bonny Vale". After his horse Blinker failed in the Victoria Derby of October 1904 Wilson and his jockey Conquest were called before the stewards and cautioned. Blinker came a good third in the Melbourne Cup a few days later, adding credence to the stewards' suspicions. Wilson then retired from racing.

William Wilson (c. 1859 – 3 May 1890) was a jockey; his most notable ride was on Don Juan, which he rode to victory in the 1873 Melbourne Cup.

James Wilson, Jr. (c. 1856 – 16 November 1935) also rode as a jockey, beginning on New Year's Day 1869, when, weighing 4 stone (25 kg) and dubbed "Young Jim" Wilson, he competed at Flemington. He soon became well known, but was not of a slim build like his brother and turned to Australian rules football, playing for Geelong, which he captained in 1878 and 1879. Geelong was one of the six clubs which in 1897 broke away from in the Victorian Football Association (VFA) to found the more professional Victorian Football League (VFL). He was also a good cricketer, champion boxer and billiard player.

After seeing the successes of his sons, James Wilson (senior) purchased "Frankfurt" estate for them as a racetrack. He then helped James Wilson Jr. purchase the adjoining "Kingston estate" and "Bonny Vale" at Queenscliff and achieved considerable success as a trainer of thoroughbred horses. Notable wins included:

- Australian Cup: Pendil (1909)
- AJC Metropolitan Handicap: Sir Andrew (1923)
- Oakleigh Plate: Perspective (1926)
- AJC St Leger: Sir Andrew (1923) Brimming and Monodia
- VRC St Leger: Silver King (1885); Danaus (1911); Nautical (1921)

For Herbert Power:

- Sydney Cup: Diffidence (1899)
- Melbourne Cup: Merriwee (1899)
- VRC Oaks: Wilari (1911)
- VRC St Leger: Wilari (1912)
- Victoria Derby: Merriwee (1899), Wilari (1911)

His own horses included:

- Ascot Vale Stakes: Newhaven (1896)
- Australian Cup: The Rover (1921), part owner
- Caulfield Guineas: Ringmaster (1885); and Danaus (1910)
- Caulfield Futurity Stakes: Palmer (1900)
- AJC Champagne Stakes: Outlook (1918))
- Debutant Stakes: Scotland
- Maribyrnong Plate: Newhaven (1895); and Philio (1910)
- AJC Metropolitan Handicap: Sir Andrew (1923)
- Oakleigh Plate: Perspective (1926); later sold to S. P. Mackay for 2,000 guineas.
- AJC St Leger: Sir Andrew
- VRC St Leger: Silver King (1885); Danaus (1911); and Nautical (1921)
- AJC Sires Produce Stakes: Outlook (1918). He was then sold to S. P. Mackay for 5,000 guineas.
- Toorak Handicap: King's Bounty (1917)
- Victoria Derby: Newhaven (1896), later won 1896 Melbourne Cup trained by W. S. Hickenbotham and sent to England.

Other good horses were The Quiver, Practical, and Brimming. Bobadil was a successful sire for the stud.

A long-time jockey for both Wilsons was Chris Moore (c. 1864 – 3 September 1934), who was disqualified for a year after failing to start on Quiver at the Oaks Stakes (1894). Other jockeys for the Bonny Vale stables were James E. Pike, Dempsey, W. Duncan, R. Lewis, A Wilson and A. Fullarton.

Strong of build and will like his father, James Wilson, Jr. was reticent, shunned publicity, and formed few friendships. He was not one to start a fight, but if provoked would not step back, and could use his fists to good effect. Like his father he could be abrupt and overbearing but on the right occasion could be relaxed and entertaining. He was declared insolvent in 1934 as a result of the Great Depression and "Bonny Vale" was sold. He died in a private hospital after some months of poor health. His remains were buried in a private ceremony at the Point Lonsdale Cemetery.

== Family ==
James Wilson (26 December 1828 – November 1917) married Mary Jamieson (1835-1866). Among their children were:

- Eldest daughter (Anna) Maria Wilson (c. 1853 – 14 February 1946) married Edward Rogers Sparrow (c. 1847 – 1 October 1918) on 18 April 1882
- Elizabeth Wilson (1855-1928)
- James Wilson, Jr. (c. 1856 – 16 November 1935) married Jessie Cunningham ( – ), daughter of George Cunningham previously MLA for South Grant, on 10 December 1884. They had a home "Bonny Vale" in Ocean Grove
- Emma May Wilson (1857-1937)
- Sarah Jane Wilson (1858-1859)
- William Wilson (c. 1859 – 3 May 1890)
- Sarah Jane Wilson (1860-1943)
- Rose Jamieson Mary Wilson (1862-1914)

Remarried Elizabeth Ann Clements (1840-1867). They had one child:

George Joseph Clement Wilson (1867-1914)
