= 1876 in sports =

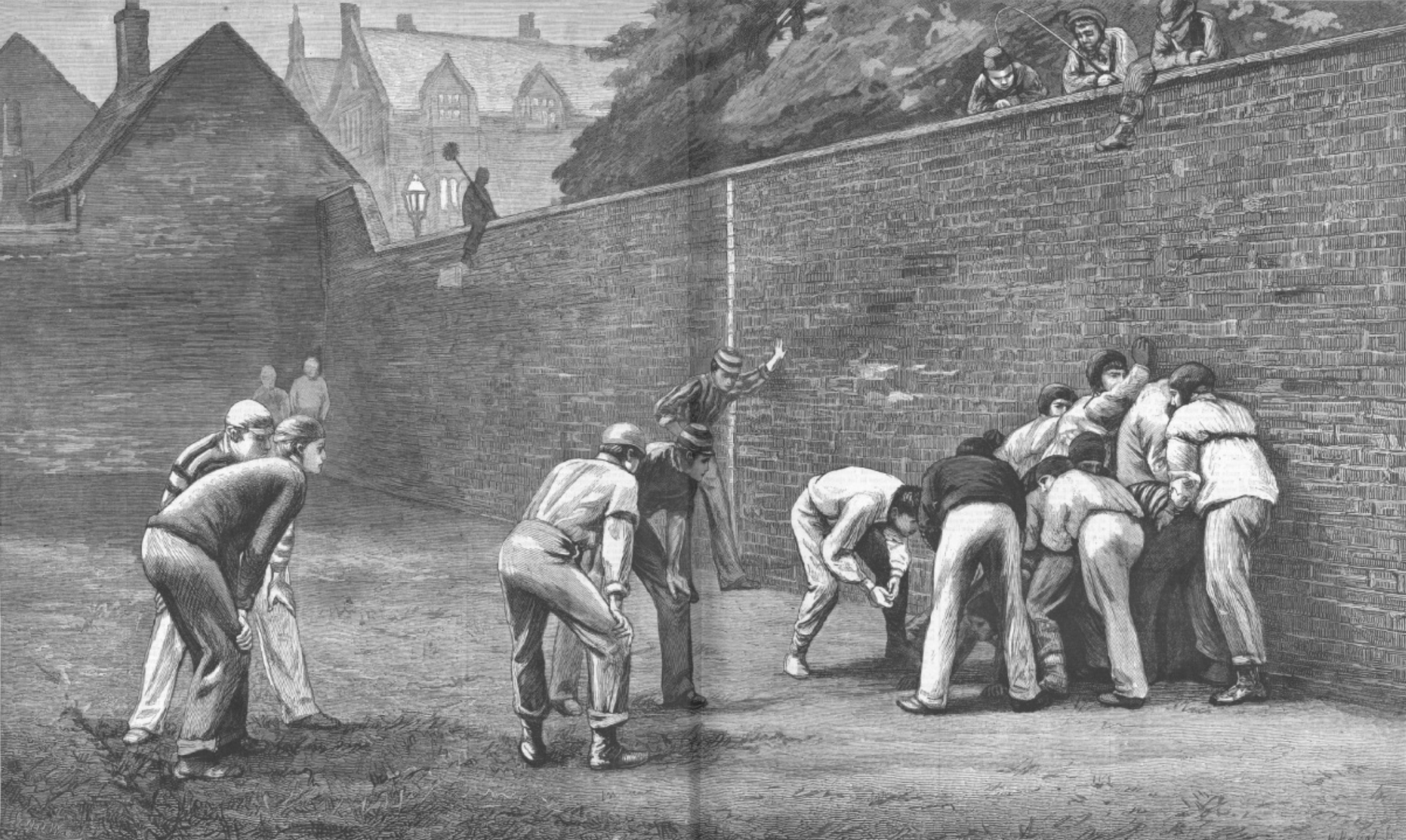
Illustration of the Eton Wall game (1876)

1876 in sports describes the year's events in world sport.

== Athletics ==
- USA Outdoor Track and Field Championships

== American football ==
College championship

- College football national championship – Yale Bulldogs

Events

- 23 November — representatives of Harvard Crimson, Yale Bulldogs, Princeton Tigers and Columbia Lions meet at the Massasoit House in Springfield, Massachusetts to standardise a new code of rules based on the Canadian rugby game first introduced to Harvard by Canada's McGill University in 1874. The rules are based largely on the English Rugby Football Union's code, though one important difference is the introduction of the touchdown as the primary means of scoring instead of the field goal (a change that will later occur in rugby football itself). Three of the schools (Harvard, Columbia and Princeton) form an Intercollegiate Football Association as a result of the meeting. Yale will join in 1879.
- Walter Camp enrolls at Yale University and will become perhaps the most important figure in college football history.

== Association football ==
England

- FA Cup final – The Wanderers 3–0 Old Etonians in a replay following a 1–1 draw (both games played at The Oval).
- Middlesbrough FC founded as a winter activity by Middlesbrough Cricket Club.

Scotland

- Scottish Cup final – Queen's Park 2–0 Third Lanark at Hampden Park (replay; following 1–1 draw at Hamilton Crescent)

Wales

- Establishment of the Football Association of Wales, the world's third oldest football association.
- 25 March — Wales plays its first international match against Scotland in Glasgow, Scotland winning 4–0. Wales is the third oldest international football team.

== Baseball ==
National championship

- National League champions - Chicago White Stockings

Events

- 2 February — the National League of Professional Base Ball Clubs (NL) is founded at the Grand Central Hotel in New York City. It is the first pro sports league, North American style: closed and territorial. Major League Baseball recognises this event as the beginning of "all-time history".
- The venerable Mutuals and Athletics, holding the New York and Philadelphia franchises, are competitive failures on field and off. They cancel their final western trips and suffer expulsion, the last formerly amateur clubs in the majors.

== Boxing ==
Events

- After three years of inactivity, Tom Allen finally defends his American Championship title against Joe Goss at Boone County, Kentucky. Goss, another English fighter, takes the title when Allen is disqualified for a foul punch in the 14th round. Goss is another inactive champion and does not defend the title until May 1880.

== Canadian Football ==
- Ottawa Football Club is founded. They would go on to win the Grey Cup 9 times before folding in 1996.

== Cricket ==
Events

- 14 January — formation of Essex County Cricket Club at a meeting in the Shire Hall, Chelmsford. There have been previous county organisations in Essex going back to the 18th century, focused mainly on Hornchurch Cricket Club.
- W. G. Grace becomes the first player to score 2,000 runs and take 100 wickets in a season: 2,622 runs and 130 wickets in 26 matches.
- Grace makes his highest first-class score of 344, for MCC v Kent at Canterbury in August. Two days later he makes 177 for Gloucestershire v Notts, and two days after that 318 not out for Gloucestershire v Yorkshire, the latter two innings against counties with exceptionally strong bowling attacks. Thus, in three consecutive innings, Grace scores 839 runs, and is only out twice. His 344 is the first triple century scored in first class cricket. William Ward's 278 scored in 1820 has stood as a record for 56 years; within a week Grace has bettered it twice.

England

- Champion County – Gloucestershire
- Most runs – W. G. Grace 2,622 @ 62.42 (HS 344)
- Most wickets – Alfred Shaw 191 @ 13.61 (BB 8–37)

== Golf ==
Major tournaments

- British Open – Bob Martin

== Horse racing ==
England

- Grand National – Regal
- 1,000 Guineas Stakes – Camelia
- 2,000 Guineas Stakes – Petrarch
- The Derby – Kisber
- The Oaks – dead heat between Camelia and Enguerrande
- St. Leger Stakes – Petrarch

Australia

- Melbourne Cup – Briseis

Canada

- Queen's Plate – Norah P.

Ireland

- Irish Grand National – Grand National
- Irish Derby Stakes – Umpire

USA

- Kentucky Derby – Vagrant
- Preakness Stakes – Shirley
- Belmont Stakes – Algerine

== Ice skating ==
Events

- 7 January — the Glaciarium opens in Chelsea, London, as the world's first artificial ice rink.

== Rowing ==
The Boat Race

- 8 April — Cambridge wins the 33rd Oxford and Cambridge Boat Race

Other events

- The Harvard–Yale Regatta for the main event establishes the 4-mile distance and returns to the original eight-oar shells. Yale wins by 29 seconds on the Connecticut River.

== Rugby football ==
Events

- Cardiff RFC, Keighley RLFC, Kelso RFC, Oldham RLFC, Pontypridd RFC and Saracens are all established in 1876

== Yacht racing ==
America's Cup

- The New York Yacht Club retains the America's Cup as Madeleine defeats challenger Countess of Dufferin, of the Royal Canadian Yacht Club
