= 1870 Melbourne Cup =

Edition of the Melbourne Cup

- Melbourne Cup
- Location: Flemington Racecourse
- Date: 10 November 1870
- Distance: 2 miles
- Winning horse: Nimblefoot
- Winning time: 3:37.0
- Final odds: 12/1
- Jockey: John Day
- Trainer: William Lang
- Owner: Thomas Bailey
- Surface: Turf
- Attendance: 30,000

The 1870 Melbourne Cup was a two-mile handicap horse race which took place on Thursday, 10 November 1870. This year was the tenth running of the Melbourne Cup. The entire carnival was pushed back a week due to a waterlogged track.

The race became a big part of Melbourne Cup folklore. Ballarat publican Walter Craig bought Nimblefoot from Melbourne bookmaker Joe Thompson. The story goes that several months before the 1870 race Craig dreams of a horse in his colours winning the race but with its jockey wearing a black arm band, a sign of mourning. Craig told friends about this and was sure that Nimblefoot would win, but he would not live to see the 12/1 shot's tense battle with Lapdog. William Craig died on the morning of 17 August from gout and pneumonia. The story of his dream first appeared three months later, in the Bendigo Independent and was recounted in The Age newspaper the day before the Cup. In the story Craig saw a horse, whose jockey was wearing his colours and a black armband, win the Cup. Samuel Griffiths, handicapper and turf historian, scotched the story as having been fabricated by the bookmaker Joseph Bragge "Leviathan" Slack. In the end, Nimblefoot wore the colours of Craig's son-in-law Thomas Bailey and Slack made a payment of £500 to Walter Craig's widow following Nimblefoot's win.

Winning jockey Johnny Day was just 14 years old, while Hiram Howard the jockey of third-placed Valentine was just 13 years old.

A total of 56 runners were accepted for the race. From a field of 30 horses, 28 runners made their way to the start of the Melbourne Cup following the scratchings of Cortherstone and Sheet Anchor. In sunny conditions, three runners (Lapdog, Warrior and Trump Card) shared favouritism. Praetor had the best start of the runners, but it would be Barbelle that led the field at the first turn. 1868 winner Glencoe joined the leader down the back straight a few lengths in front of the head of the field. As the halfway post, Lapdog took the lead ahead of Nimblefoot, with Lapdog taking a slender lead into the Flemington straight. It was a two-horse race down the straight and both horses went stride for stride to the final post. Spectators thought the two horses might have dead-heat for first, but the judge awarded the victory to Nimblefoot. The heavyweight horses didn't feature in the finish, although Tim Whiffler did finish in the top ten.

The winning time of 3:37.0 was at the time the fastest winning time in the race's history, while Nimblefoot became the first Tasmanian-bred horse to win the race.

== Full results ==
This is the list of placegetters for the 1870 Melbourne Cup.

Place	Horse	Age Gender	Jockey	Weight	Trainer	Owner	Odds	Margin
1	Nimblefoot	7y g	Johnny Day	6 st 3 lb (39.5 kg)	William Lang	Thomas Bailey (Note: As representative of the estate of Walter Craig)	12/1	½ head
2	Lapdog	6y g	James Wilson Jr	7 st 0 lb (44.5 kg)	James Wilson	Mr J. Gilbert	5/1 eq. fav.	4 lengths
3	Valentine	5y g	Hiram Howard	6 st 4 lb (39.9 kg)		Henry Bowler	20/1	
4	Croydon	4y h	T. Brown	7 st 10 lb (49.0 kg)		Mr W. Winch	8/1	
5	Tim Whiffler	8y h	George Donnelly	10 st 0 lb (63.5 kg)	Etienne de Mestre	Etienne de Mestre	6/1	
6	Flying Dutchman	5y h	Bell	7 st 0 lb (44.5 kg)		Mr J. Haimes	25/1	
7	Duke of Montrose	Aged h	Rowe	6 st 12.5 lb (43.8 kg) (Note: Was supposed to carry 6st 9lb)		Mr J. Brown	25/1	
8	Glencoe	6y h	William Lang	9 st 12 lb (62.6 kg)	William Lang	Thomas Bailey	8/1	
9	Strop	Aged g	Joe Carter	7 st 12 lb (49.9 kg)		William Field	25/1	
—N/a	Warrior	7y g	Joe Morrison	9 st 0 lb (57.2 kg)	Robert Standish Sevior	Austin Saqui	5/1 eq. fav.	
—N/a	Praetor	5y h	William Yeomans	8 st 4 lb (52.6 kg)		Mr P. Lewis	25/1	
—N/a	Barbelle	5y m	Brickwood Colley	8 st 4 lb (52.6 kg)		Edward Lee	25/1	
—N/a	The Earl	5y h	Charles Stanley	8 st 0 lb (50.8 kg)		John Tait	33/1	
—N/a	Milesian	Aged g	Thomas Enderson	7 st 12 lb (49.9 kg)		John Cleeland	50/1	
—N/a	The Monk	6y h	J. Adderley	7 st 12 lb (49.9 kg)		Mr F. Henty	20/1	
—N/a	Barbarian	4y h	Samuel Davis	7 st 10 lb (49.0 kg)		Edward Lee	12/1	
—N/a	Sir William	5y h	J. Kean	7 st 11 lb (49.4 kg) (Note: Was supposed to carry 7st 9lb)		Andrew Town	25/1	
—N/a	The Pearl	4y h	H. Lewis	7 st 4 lb (46.3 kg)		John Tait	33/1	
—N/a	Trump Card	5y h	S. Atkins	7 st 5 lb (46.7 kg)		Mr G. Adams	5/1 eq. fav.	
—N/a	Sir John	Aged h	C. Greene	7 st 2 lb (45.4 kg)		Jack Chaaffe	14/1	
—N/a	Partisan	4y h	Lemon	6 st 10 lb (42.6 kg)		Edward Lee	100/1	
—N/a	Mischief	5y m	Bourke	6 st 5 lb (40.4 kg)	James Wilson	James Wilson	50/1	
—N/a	Freetrader	6y g	Swales	6 st 4 lb (39.9 kg)		Mr L. Sararan	100/1	
—N/a	Palmerston	6y g	William Enderson	6 st 4 lb (39.9 kg) (Note: Was supposed to carry 6st 2lb)		Sam Waldock	100/1	
—N/a	Paddy's Land	Aged h	J. Sherringham	6 st 0 lb (38.1 kg)		Mr H. Gamble	100/1	
—N/a	Huntsman	5y g	W. Brown	6 st 0 lb (38.1 kg)		Mr H. Kett	100/1	
—N/a	Saladin	6y g	Ewart	5 st 10 lb (36.3 kg)		Mr J.E. Crook	25/1	
—N/a	Patience	6y m	Chalker	5 st 7 lb (34.9 kg)		Mr J.R. Harper	100/1	
SCR	Cotherstone	Aged h	—N/a	6 st 2 lb (39.0 kg)	—N/a	Mr A. Douglass	—N/a	
SCR	Sheet Anchor	6y h	—N/a	5 st 12 lb (37.2 kg)	—N/a	Mr S. Thompson	—N/a	
SCR	Farmer's Daughter	6y m	—N/a	6 st 5 lb (40.4 kg)	—N/a	Mr H. Hepburn	—N/a	

== Prizemoney ==
First prize £1210, second prize £50, third prize £20.

== See also ==
- Melbourne Cup
- List of Melbourne Cup winners
- Victoria Racing Club
