= 1869 Melbourne Cup =

Annual horse race in Victoria, Australia

- Melbourne Cup
- Location: Flemington Racecourse
- Date: 4 November 1869
- Distance: 2 miles
- Winning horse: Warrior
- Winning time: 3:40.00
- Final odds: 10/1
- Jockey: Joe Morrison
- Trainer: Robert Sevior
- Owner: Austin Saqui
- Surface: Turf
- Attendance: 25,000

The 1869 Melbourne Cup was a two-mile handicap horse race which took place on Thursday, 4 November 1869.

This year was the ninth running of the Melbourne Cup. This was one of the first instances where the day of the race was a declared public holiday in Melbourne.

A total of 33 runners declared for the race, including previous Cup runners Barwon and The Fly, but both horses broke down in the weeks before the race. Also scratched was early favourite Manuka who had been brought from New Zealand for the race only to suffer an injury. Sydney-trained horse Warrior had defeated previous Melbourne Cup winner Glencoe in the Essendon Stakes the previous weekend and was one of the favoured runners, behind Circassian who would start favourite who had won the Metropolitan earlier in the year.

Under grey skies with passing showers, a field of 26 runners started the race. Warrior got off to a good start, but was held back by his jockey Joe Morrison to allow Bishopsbourne, Sheet Anchor and Traverton to lead the field at the first turn. Along the river straight, Traverton and Circassian took up the lead running, until Warrior eased ahead before the final turn and lead comfortably down the Flemington straight to win the Cup. Unfancied runner The Monk had tried to make up ground, but was no match for Warrior to finish second, while Phoebe ran home strongly to finish third. Palmerston, which had missed the start, finished ahead of the rest of the field in sixth. At the final turn Paddy's Land was pushed into a post by Circassian. His jockey suffering a concussion after he was knocked off the horse who was injured in the collision.

Melbourne bookmaker Austin Saqui had purchased Warrior for £400 from Sydney following the horse's nomination for the Cup. It was reported that he won more than £10,000 on the outcome of the race.

In the lead up to the race, Saqui and trainer Robert Sevior had booked young jockey Andrew Mitchelson to ride Warrior in the race, but an altercation following a sluggish training gallop saw Mitchelson removed from the ride for the more experienced Joe Morrison. Saqui would later give Mitchelson £100 from his winnings as compensation.

== Full results ==
This is the list of placegetters for the 1869 Melbourne Cup.

Place	Horse	Age Gender	Jockey	Weight	Trainer	Owner	Odds	Margin
1	Warrior	6y g	Joe Morrison	8 st 10 lb (55.3 kg)	Robert Standish Sevior	Austin Saqui	10/1	2 lengths
2	The Monk	5y h	William Enderson	7 st 0 lb (44.5 kg)		James Henderson	200/1	1 length
3	Phoebe	6y m	Samuel Davis	7 st 10 lb (49.0 kg)		Edward Lee	20/1	
4	Sir John	5y h	Finn	7 st 7 lb (47.6 kg)		Jack Chaafe	50/1	
5	Freetrader	5y g	Swales	6 st 12 lb (43.5 kg)		Mr E.T. Bernard	50/1	
6	Palmerston	5y h	Hubbard	6 st 4 lb (39.9 kg)		William John Clarke	50/1	
7	Aurora	6y m	Chalker	6 st 7 lb (41.3 kg)		Hurtle Fisher	16/1	
8	Miss Constance	4y m	Clarke Jr.	5 st 7 lb (34.9 kg)		Mr C. Clarke	100/1	
9	Strop	Aged g	S. Haynes	8 st 7 lb (54.0 kg) (Note: Was supposed to carry 8st 5lb)		William Field	8/1	
10	Circassian	6y h	J. Brown	8 st 0 lb (50.8 kg)		Mr W. Winch	2/1 fav.	
11	Albany	6y g	D. Mitchell	7 st 3 lb (45.8 kg)		Hurtle Fisher	20/1	
12	Charon	3y c	H. Lewis	7 st 0 lb (44.5 kg)		Hurtle Fisher	10/1	
—N/a	Coquette	4y m	Bobby Waterman	8 st 4 lb (52.6 kg)		Dan Melhado	100/1	
—N/a	Australian (GBR)	6y h	William Yeomans	8 st 1.5 lb (51.5 kg) (Note: Was supposed to carry 8st 0lb)		Mr H.J. Bowler	33/1	
—N/a	Traverton	Aged g	Charles Stanley	7 st 10 lb (49.0 kg)	John Tait	Thomas Ivory	5/1	
—N/a	Barbelle	4y m	Brickwood Colley	7 st 8 lb (48.1 kg)		Edward Lee	33/1	
—N/a	Lapdog	5y g	Nunn	7 st 8 lb (48.1 kg) (Note: Was supposed to carry 7st 4lb)		Mr J. Gilbert	50/1	
—N/a	Salem Scudder	Aged g	Harris	7 st 3 lb (45.8 kg)		Mr J.N. Perkins	10/1	
—N/a	Cymba	4y m	James Wilson Jr	6 st 12 lb (43.5 kg)		Mr J. Moffatt	33/1	
—N/a	Norma	5y m	Johnny Day	6 st 12 lb (43.5 kg)		Mr G. Lewis	33/1	
—N/a	Bishopbourne	4y g	Thomas Enderson	6 st 10 lb (42.6 kg)		William Field	50/1	
—N/a	Kestrel	3y f	Davidson	6 st 8.5 lb (42.0 kg) (Note: Was supposed to carry 6st 7lb)		William Pearson	50/1	
—N/a	Sheet Anchor	5y h	Kerr	6 st 4 lb (39.9 kg)		Mr J. Kerr	6/1	
—N/a	Miranda	Aged m	Bourke	5 st 11 lb (36.7 kg) (Note: Was supposed to carry 5st 7lb)		Mr J. Cain	50/1	
—N/a	Dolo	Aged g	E. Davis	5 st 9 lb (35.8 kg) (Note: Was supposed to carry 5st 7lb)		Mr J. Brown	50/1	
Fell	Paddy's Land	Aged h	Ward	6 st 3 lb (39.5 kg)		Mr H. Gamble	30/1	
SCR	Manuka (NZL)	4y h	—N/a	9 st 4 lb (59.0 kg)	—N/a	Mr H. Redwood	—N/a	
SCR	Lamplighter	3y c	—N/a	7 st 0 lb (44.5 kg)	—N/a	Patrick Keighran	—N/a	
SCR	Praetor	4y h	—N/a	6 st 8 lb (41.7 kg)	—N/a	Mr P. Lewis	—N/a	
SCR	Phosphorus	5y h	—N/a	6 st 7 lb (41.3 kg)	—N/a	Mr P. Lewis	—N/a	
SCR	Shamrock	Aged g	—N/a	5 st 7 lb (34.9 kg)	—N/a	Mr J. Brown	—N/a	

== Prizemoney ==
First prize £1190, second prize £50, third prize £20.

== See also ==
- List of Melbourne Cup winners
- Victoria Racing Club
