= Nimblefoot (horse) =

Australian-bred Thoroughbred racehorse

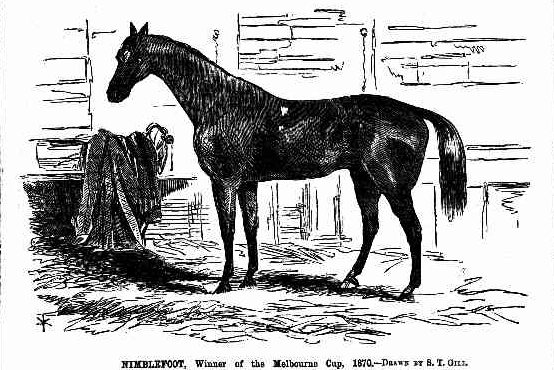
- Illustration of Nimblefoot (1870)
- Sire: Panic (GB)
- Grandsire: Alarm (GB)
- Dam: Quickstep (AUS)
- Damsire: Lugar (GB)
- Sex: Gelding
- Foaled: 1863
- Country: Australia
- Colour: Bay
- Breeder: John Lord
- Owner: Walter Craig (1867–1870); Thomas Bailey (1870); Horatio Hoskins (1870–1871)
- Trainer: William Lang
- Jockey: Johnny Day
- Record: 58: 19-16-3

Major wins
- Melbourne Cup (1870); Hotham Handicap (1870); Australian Cup (1871)
- Last updated on 2 August 2022

Nimblefoot was an Australian bred Thoroughbred racehorse that won the 1870 Melbourne Cup.

Bred by John Lord in Tasmania, Nimblefoot stood about 15 hands, 3 inches. Its sire was English horse Panic, who ran second in the 1865 Melbourne Cup, with its dam Quickstep also an imported English horse. (Note: Sources suggest that Quickstep was foaled in Great Britain, while others suggest Australia.)

== Racing career ==
Nimblefoot early races were in Tasmania, where it ran second as a three-year-old in the Launceston St. Leger in 1867. At the same race week, the horse finished second behind John Tait's horse Volunteer over three miles in the Queen's Plate. Following those races, Nimblefoot was sold for £300 to bookmaker Joseph Thompson and taken to Victoria.

In its debut at Flemington in 1867, Nimblefoot won the Trial Stakes at the Victoria Racing Club (VRC) Autumn Meeting over a mile and a half and then was sold for £600 to Walter Craig.

Craig entered Nimblefoot in both the 1867 Melbourne Cup and Queen's Plate during the VRC Spring Meeting, both races won by Etienne de Mestre's horse Tim Whiffler. In Craig's hometown of Ballarat, Nimblefoot placed second in both the Ballarat Cup and Sutton Handicap. In 1868, Nimblefoot again was unplaced in the 1868 Melbourne Cup and Queen's Plate both won by Glencoe.

Following a number of wins in country Victoria races in 1869, Nimblefoot was unplaced in the Australian Cup won by Gasworks. The horse was then spelled in Tasmania for nearly a year before returning to Victoria ahead of the 1870 spring racing season, where it would be trained by William Lang as a stablemate to Glencoe. On the Saturday before the 1870 Melbourne Cup, and backed considerably by many from Ballarat, Nimblefoot won the Hotham Handicap on heavy ground over a mile and a half.

== 1870 Melbourne Cup ==
In an often reported story, Nimblefoot's owner, Walter Craig, dreamt four months before the race that his horse won the Cup but noted the jockey wore a black armband. Craig's prediction came true. His horse won the Cup and the jockey, John Day, wore the armband in Craig's honour, as Craig had died of gout and pneumonia at the age of 45 on 16 August 1870, three months before the running of the race. Samuel Griffiths, handicapper and turf historian, later scotched the story as a fabrication by the bookmaker Joseph Bragge "Leviathan" Slack, who paid out £500 each to Thomas Bailey (Craig's son-in-law) and John Day for the bet they placed with him, and concocted the story for the extra publicity.

Nimblefoot wasn't given much of a chance in the Melbourne Cup against the Sydney-trained horses, but trailing behind Glencoe halfway through the race, the horse went to the front by the half-mile post and followed closely by Lapdog gave one of the closest finishes in the then short history of the Melbourne Cup to win by a half-head in a then record time of 3:37.0.

Johnny Day, the jockey, was a notable person in his own right. As a child, he had been a leading figure in the sport of pedestrianism and travelled to England to compete against leading pedestrian athletes of the day before returning to Australia and becoming a speed walking performer in the theatre, although it was said that his backers did not receive the profits they expected from supporting him. Day was just 14 years old when he rode Nimblefoot to victory in the Melbourne Cup.

After a dispute resulting from Day's abscondment from the trainer William Lang soon after the 1870 Melbourne Cup, Day was required to return to his apprenticeship and continued to ride horses until at least 1877 when he suffered a bad fall in a ride in Yarrawonga. He died in 1885 in Inglewood of Addison's disease.

== Later career ==
Later in 1870 the solicitor Horatio Huntly Hoskins purchased Nimblefoot for £650, which was said to be one of the highest prices then paid for a gelding in Australia. Hoskins also purchased Glencoe from Bailey, while retaining William Lang as trainer of both horses. By June 1871 Hoskins was deeply in debt to Lang and in 1872 agreed to sell Lang the horses for the amount he owed. Hoskins had other debts however, and was forced to plead bankruptcy.

In March 1871, Nimblefoot won the Australian Cup race at Flemington, then held over two and a quarter miles. Starting 5/4 favourite, the horse was ridden by Lang in the race and led from almost the start to win by two lengths over a field of six horses.

Then owned by a Mr J. Arthur, Nimblefoot was again entered into the Australian Cup on 7 March 1873 and put in a solid run to finish second behind Warrior.

== Pedigree ==
Pedigree of Nimblefoot (AUS) 1863
Sire Panic (GB) 1858	Alarm (GB); 1842	Venison	Partisan
Sire Panic (GB) 1858	Alarm (GB); 1842	Venison	Fawn
Sire Panic (GB) 1858	Alarm (GB); 1842	Southdown	Defence
Sire Panic (GB) 1858	Alarm (GB); 1842	Southdown	Feltona
Sire Panic (GB) 1858	Queen Of Beauty (GB); 1854	Melbourne	Humphrey Clinker
Sire Panic (GB) 1858	Queen Of Beauty (GB); 1854	Melbourne	Cervantes Mare
Sire Panic (GB) 1858	Queen Of Beauty (GB); 1854	Birthday	Pantaloon
Sire Panic (GB) 1858	Queen Of Beauty (GB); 1854	Birthday	Honoria
Dam Quickstep (AUS) 1853	Lugar (GB); 1846	Touchstone	Camel
Dam Quickstep (AUS) 1853	Lugar (GB); 1846	Touchstone	Banter
Dam Quickstep (AUS) 1853	Lugar (GB); 1846	Bella	Acteon
Dam Quickstep (AUS) 1853	Lugar (GB); 1846	Bella	Bella
Dam Quickstep (AUS) 1853	Esplanade (GB); 1847	Cotherstone	Touchstone
Dam Quickstep (AUS) 1853	Esplanade (GB); 1847	Cotherstone	Emma
Dam Quickstep (AUS) 1853	Esplanade (GB); 1847	Glacis	Venison
Dam Quickstep (AUS) 1853	Esplanade (GB); 1847	Glacis	Fortress
