= Tim Whiffler (1862 ship) =

History
- Name: Madurese (1862); Tim Whiffler (1874-1875); Geestemünde (1886)
- Namesake: Tim Whiffler (British horse)
- Builder: New Bedford, Massachusetts
- Launched: 1862

General characteristics
- Tonnage: 1133 GRT
- Length: 189 feet (58 m)
- Beam: 37.4 feet (11.4 m)
- Depth: 23.4 feet (7.1 m)

Tim Whiffler was a wooden full-rigged ship built in New Bedford, Massachusetts, as the Madurese and launched in 1862. She was later renamed Tim Whiffler and owned in 1874 by T.Thompson. She was used in the passenger and cargo trade to Maryborough, Queensland for two voyages in 1874 and 1875.

She disappears from the Lloyds Register in 1876, before reappearing as the German vessel Geestemünde, registered at Geestemünde.
