= 1868 Melbourne Cup =

Annual horse race in Victoria, Australia

- Melbourne Cup
- Location: Flemington Racecourse
- Date: 5 November 1868
- Distance: 2 miles
- Winning horse: Glencoe
- Winning time: 3:42.00
- Final odds: 10/1
- Jockey: Charles Stanley
- Trainer: John Tait
- Owner: John Tait
- Surface: Turf
- Attendance: 25,000

The 1868 Melbourne Cup was a two-mile handicap horse race which took place on Thursday, 5 November 1868.

This year was the eighth running of the Melbourne Cup.

Following nominations, 32 runners declared for the race, but there were a number of scratching on race day which saw the field reduced to 24 horses. Previous year's winner Sydney Tim Whiffler was brought back by owner/trainer Etienne de Mestre and would start the race as favourite ahead of Little Fish and Ragpicker. Barwon, racing in their fifth Melbourne Cup race led the field past the grandstand to the first turn followed by stablemate Shenandoah and Little Fish. Extending their lead down the back straight, Barwon set the pace before being overtaken by Shenandoah who was joined at the front by Glencoe. At the final turn, Glencoe looked to have the race under control until a late gallop by Strop saw the final margin of victory at one length. Shenandoah came in third ahead of Tim Whiffler and Smolensko.

Glencoe's win was John Tait's second Melbourne Cup win after his horse The Barb won in 1866. It was the third year in a row that a Sydney-trained horse had won the race.

== Full results ==
This is the list of placegetters for the 1868 Melbourne Cup.

Place	Horse	Age Gender	Jockey	Weight	Trainer	Owner	Odds	Margin
1	Glencoe	4y h	Charles Stanley	9 st 1 lb (57.6 kg)	John Tait	John Tait	10/1	1 length
2	Strop	Aged g	Walsh	7 st 10 lb (49.0 kg)		William Field	20/1	3 lengths
3	Shenandoah	Aged m	Thomas Pullar	7 st 5 lb (46.7 kg)	Stephen Mahon	John Cleeland	15/1	
4	Sydney Tim Whiffler	6y h	J. Kean	10 st 4 lb (65.3 kg)	Etienne de Mestre	Etienne de Mestre	5/2 fav.	
5	Smolensko	Aged h	D. Mitchell	6 st 13 lb (44.0 kg) (Note: Was supposed to carry 6st 10lb)		Mr J. Haimes	33/1	
—N/a	Seagull	5y m	Bobby Waterman	8 st 0 lb (50.8 kg)		Patrick Keighran	33/1	
—N/a	Stumpy	Aged g	George Donnelly	8 st 0 lb (50.8 kg)		Patrick Keighran	20/1	
—N/a	Nimblefoot	5y g	Joe Carter	7 st 12 lb (49.9 kg)		Walter Craig	33/1	
—N/a	Gulnare	6y m	G. Thompson	7 st 10 lb (49.0 kg)		Edward Lee	25/1	
—N/a	Bylong	5y h	T. Bennett	7 st 7 lb (47.6 kg)	John Tait	Edward Lee	20/1	
—N/a	Lady Manners Sutton	5y m	J. Adderley	7 st 6 lb (47.2 kg)		Louis Lawrence Smith	20/1	
—N/a	Little Fish	4y h	A. Davis	7 st 6 lb (47.2 kg)		Hurtle Fisher	4/1	
—N/a	Barwon	9y h	Sullivan	7 st 5 lb (46.7 kg)		John Cleeland	50/1	
—N/a	Sylvia	4y m	Atkin	7 st 7 lb (47.6 kg) (Note: Was supposed to carry 7st 5lb)		Patrick Keighran	25/1	
—N/a	Tasman	Aged g	Mathieson	7 st 2 lb (45.4 kg)		Mr J. Haimes	100/1	
—N/a	Snip	Aged g	H. Taylor	7 st 0 lb (44.5 kg)		Mr H.W. Jellett	100/1	
—N/a	Cupbearer	Aged g	Harry Tothill	8 st 3 lb (52.2 kg) (Note: Was supposed to carry 6st 13lb)		Thomas Joseph Ryan	100/1	
—N/a	Mary Ann	Aged m	Goodie	7 st 4 lb (46.3 kg) (Note: Was supposed to carry 6st 11lb)		Mr J. Whitehead	50/1	
—N/a	The Fly	4y m	William Enderson	6 st 9 lb (42.2 kg)		Sam Waldock	10/1	
—N/a	New Chum	Aged g	T. Brown	6 st 7 lb (41.3 kg)		Mr A. Clingin	100/1	
—N/a	Milesian	Aged g	Tremble	6 st 7 lb (41.3 kg)		Mr G. Carmichael	100/1	
—N/a	Ragpicker	3y f	Samuel Davis	6 st 6 lb (40.8 kg) (Note: Was supposed to carry 6st 4lb)		Hurtle Fisher	4/1	
—N/a	Cedric	Aged g	Thomas Enderson	6 st 6 lb (40.8 kg) (Note: Was supposed to carry 6st 3lb)		Mr J. Lamb	100/1	
—N/a	Lantern	6y g	H. Lewis	6 st 11 lb (43.1 kg) (Note: Was supposed to carry 6st 0lb)		James J. Miller	100/1	
Last	Booyoolee	6y h	Row	7 st 0 lb (44.5 kg) (Note: Was supposed to carry 6st 10lb)		Mr J. Lamb	100/1	
SCR	Palmerston	4y h	—N/a	8 st 2 lb (51.7 kg)	—N/a	William John Clarke	—N/a	
SCR	Monkey	Aged g	—N/a	5 st 7 lb (34.9 kg)	—N/a	Mr Meekan	—N/a	
SCR	The Swell	4y h	—N/a	6 st 10 lb (42.6 kg)	—N/a	Sam Waldock	—N/a	
SCR	B.A.	4y h	—N/a	6 st 12 lb (43.5 kg)	—N/a	Mr H.W. Jellett	—N/a	
SCR	Regalia	4y m	—N/a	7 st 5 lb (46.7 kg)	—N/a	Thomas Joseph Ryan	—N/a	
SCR	The Barb	5y h	—N/a	10 st 7 lb (66.7 kg)	—N/a	John Tait	—N/a	
SCR	Boiardo	4y h	—N/a	7 st 6 lb (47.2 kg)	—N/a	Mr J. Field	—N/a	
SCR	Melbourne Tim Whiffler	6y h	—N/a	8 st 2 lb (51.7 kg)	—N/a	Walter Craig	—N/a	

== Prizemoney ==
First prize £1190, second prize £50, third prize £20.

== See also ==
- Melbourne Cup
- List of Melbourne Cup winners
- Victoria Racing Club
