= Peter St Albans =

Australian jockey

- Born: Michael Bowden; 15 November 1864; Geelong, Victoria, Australia
- Died: 23 July 1898 (aged 33); Geelong, Victoria, Australia
- Other name: Peter Bowden
- Occupations: Jockey, Horse Trainer
- Spouse: Anastasia Ryan (married 1896)
- Parent(s): Michael Bowden & Cathleen Carmody

Peter St Albans (15 November 1864 – 23 July 1898) is the youngest jockey ever to win the Melbourne Cup. He won in 1876 riding Briseis at the recorded age of thirteen (he was actually eleven, eight days short of his twelfth birthday). His record is unlikely to be beaten as he rode in the Melbourne Cup when he was under the stated minimum age of thirteen. He secured the mount for the three-year-old Briseis after the regular stable jockey could not make the featherweight of 6 stone and 4 pounds (39 kilos). Before 75,000 at Flemington, Briseis, with St Albans in the saddle, comfortably won by one length in the biggest field of all time. "At 4 o'clock the starter released the 33 runners and they swept down the long Flemington straight in a thundering rush. Briseis, ridden by what one writer termed a mere child, (in the Cup) captured a rare double, the Victoria Race Club Derby, and the Melbourne Cup. Shouts and hurrahs were heard, hats were thrown in the air and one excited individual fell on his back in the attempt to do a somersault. The boy who rode the winner was carried around the pack and is the hero of the day," reported the Australasian Sketcher in 1876. Both Peter St Albans and Briseis have now become racing legends, and Briseis is regarded as one of the greatest mares foaled in Australia.

== Background ==
Prior to winning the 1876 Melbourne Cup, St Albans had an earlier important victory aboard Briseis when the 11-year-old rode her to win the 1876 Doncaster when the then two-year-old filly was only allowed to carry an even smaller weight of 5 stone 7 pounds (34 kilos). Before going to Sydney as a strapper with Briseis, St Albans had won his first race, a maiden plate at Geelong, and on Briseis, but due to his inexperience he wasn't booked to ride the filly in the Doncaster at Randwick. However, as her jockey Tom Hales was over the weight that she was allowed to carry, he recommended the young strapper - St Albans - as showing great ability as a horseman, and having a special bond with the filly. Many ardent racegoers questioned the running of Briseis as a two-year-old in the demanding Doncaster, particularly with an 11-year-old in the saddle. However, they made a great team. Altogether they won three Sydney races at Randwick that autumn.

By the age of seventeen Peter St Albans had also added the Sires' Produce Stakes and the Geelong Cup to his winnings.

St. Albans, however, only had a limited career in the saddle. Following a fall in Sydney he became a horse trainer at 19 under the name of Peter Bowden. He went on to become a successful trainer and trained Forest King who was runner-up in the 1891 Caulfield Cup.

He died in 1898 at the age of 35, and it is said that he had one of the biggest funerals ever seen at Geelong. The Geelong Racing Club each year award the Peter St Albans Trophy to the champion jockey at Geelong (most wins at that circuit).

Peter St Albans had been born in Geelong on 15 November 1864 as Michael Bowden, named after his father, but he soon became known as Peter. He then, for in his racing career, took as a surname the name of the stud where he had been born, and where he worked.

It has been said, and has become racing legend, that Peter St Albans was Aboriginal, and the first Aboriginal jockey to win the Melbourne Cup. The legend arose as, not yet being 13-years-old St. Albans was too young to ride in the 1876 Melbourne Cup. Thus, to allow him to race Briseis in the Cup, it was argued his birthdate and parents were unknown, and from this the legend of him being Aboriginal grew. That he changed his surname is supposed to be the proof that his mother was Aboriginal; and that the owner of the stud James Wilson was devoted to St Albans is supposed to be the proof that either he or his son is St Albans' father. The tale also contends St Albans was left as a baby on the doorstep of one of the stud grooms, Michael Bowden, and raised by him and his wife. This is all strongly denied by his family and his descendants, who say that Michael Bowden and his wife were Peter's true parents. They even hold a copy of Peter's birth certificate. A colour painting by Frederick Woodhouse featuring St Albans, youthful, and very white, standing alongside Briseis with stable jockey Tom Hales in the saddle also confirms the family's story; as does a wood engraving of Briseis with St Albans in the saddle held by the State Library of Victoria.

== Death ==
He died at the home of his father-in-law, Mr William Ryan at Geelong on 23 July 1898. Peter Bowden aka St. Albans was survived by his wife, Anastasia. He was buried at The Eastern Cemetery, Geelong on 25 July 1898. The funeral was watched by hundreds of locals and was possibly the biggest funeral in the history of Geelong at the time.
