= Tim Whiffler (British horse) =

British Thoroughbred racehorse

- Sire: Van Galen
- Grandsire: Van Tromp
- Dam: Sybil
- Damsire: The Ugly Buck
- Sex: Stallion
- Foaled: 1859
- Country: Great Britain
- Colour: Brown
- Record: 24, 11-4-1

Tim Whiffler (1859 – 1883) was a British racehorse and sire. He was the best racehorse of his generation and was later exported to Australia.

== Background ==
Tim Whiffler was not an attractive horse according to reports in both England and Australia. He was purchased by William "Bully" Brown to enter stud where he was a successful sire.

== Racing career ==
At age three, Tim Whiffler won the Chester Cup, the Ascot Gold Vase, the Goodwood Cup, and the Doncaster Cup, as well as other rich races. He also had success during his four-year-old season.

== Stud career ==
Tim Whiffler (known as "English Tim Whiffler" in Australia) was a successful stallion, and made a significant contribution to Australian bloodstock, especially through his daughters.

Notable offspring:

- Briseis (1873) - won the 1876 Melbourne Cup
- Sybil (1873) - won the 1877 Australian Cup
- Darriwell (1874) - won the 1879 Melbourne Cup
- Pollio (1876) - won the 1882 Australian Cup

== Sire line tree ==
- Tim Whiffler
  - Muster
  - Prosper
    - Lord Coventry
  - Little Tim
  - Coventry
  - Volo
  - Napoleon
    - Silver Mine
    - Mozart
      - Amadeus
      - Musician
      - Timbrel
    - Lord Charles Scott
  - Darriwell
    - Cheddar
    - Clock Na Bien
  - Rapidity
    - Archie
      - Realm
  - Pollio
  - Ambassador
  - Claptrap

== Pedigree ==
Pedigree of Tim Whiffler (GB), brown horse, 1859
Sire Van Galen 1853	Van Tromp; 1844	Lanercost	Liverpool
Sire Van Galen 1853	Van Tromp; 1844	Lanercost	Otis
Sire Van Galen 1853	Van Tromp; 1844	Barbelle	Sandbeck
Sire Van Galen 1853	Van Tromp; 1844	Barbelle	Darioletta
Sire Van Galen 1853	Little Casino; 1843	Inheritor	Lottery
Sire Van Galen 1853	Little Casino; 1843	Inheritor	Handmasiden
Sire Van Galen 1853	Little Casino; 1843	Waverley mare	Waverley
Sire Van Galen 1853	Little Casino; 1843	Waverley mare	Shuttle mare
Dam Sybil 1851	The Ugly Buck; 1841	Venison	Partisan
Dam Sybil 1851	The Ugly Buck; 1841	Venison	Fawn
Dam Sybil 1851	The Ugly Buck; 1841	Monstrosity	Plenipotentiary
Dam Sybil 1851	The Ugly Buck; 1841	Monstrosity	Puce
Dam Sybil 1851	Sylph; 1832	Filho da Puta	Haphazard
Dam Sybil 1851	Sylph; 1832	Filho da Puta	Mrs Barnet
Dam Sybil 1851	Sylph; 1832	Twatty	Whalebone
Dam Sybil 1851	Sylph; 1832	Twatty	Canopus mare

== See also ==
- Tim Whiffler (Australian horse)
