= Briseis (Australian horse) =

Australian-bred Thoroughbred racehorse

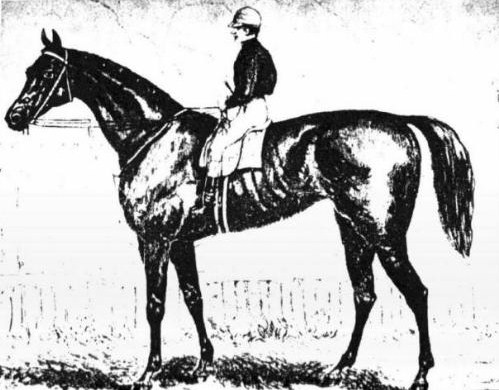
- Sire: Tim Whiffler (GB)
- Grandsire: Van Galen
- Dam: Musidora
- Damsire: The Premier (GB)
- Sex: Filly
- Foaled: 1873
- Country: Australia
- Colour: Brown
- Breeder: James Wilson
- Owner: James Wilson
- Trainer: James Wilson
- Record: 18: 6 wins & other places

Major wins
- 1876 AJC All Aged Stakes; 1876 AJC Doncaster Handicap; 1876 VRC Melbourne Cup; 1876 VRC Oaks; 1876 VRC Victoria Derby

Honours
- Australian Racing Hall of Fame; Briseis Gold Cup at Geelong
- Last updated on 25 May 2011

Briseis foaled in 1873, was a brown Australian Thoroughbred filly that is regarded as one of the greatest mares ever foaled in Australia. As a two-year-old she won the AJC Doncaster Handicap and the weight for age (w.f.a.) AJC All Aged Stakes. Then as a three-year-old she won the VRC Victoria Derby (by 3 lengths, in record time), the 1876 Melbourne Cup (by 2 lengths) and the VRC Oaks, all within six days.

== Breeding ==
She was a brown filly sired by Tim Whiffler (GB) out of Musidora by The Premier (GB). Musidora won the VRC Sires Produce Stakes, the VRC Queens Plate and other races. She was the dam of six winners including, Miss Jessie, 1868 (won the VRC Victoria Derby) and Sea Spray, 1870 (won VRC St Leger Stakes and South Australian St Leger Stakes). Briseis belonged to an old Colonial Family, C5, that was not accepted into the General Stud Book, but it is included in the Australian Stud Book.

Briseis was bred, owned and trained by James Wilson at his St Albans stud near Geelong in Victoria.

== Racing career ==
=== At the age of two years ===
As a two-year-old Briseis had three minor placings from five starts. She was allotted 5 stone 7 lbs. (35 kg) and started 4/1 equal favourite in the AJC Doncaster Handicap at Randwick. Owing to the light weight she was allotted she was ridden to victory in the race by the 12-year-old Peter St Albans. At her next two starts she won a flying handicap and the w.f.a. AJC All Aged Stakes.

=== At the age of three years ===
As a three-year-old at the VRC spring carnival of 1876, Briseis raced on all four days. She won the VRC Derby on the Saturday, (by three lengths and taking 1 3/4 seconds off the race record); the Melbourne Cup (again ridden by Peter St Albans, who was still 12 years old, to win by two lengths in record time from a record 33 starters), on the Tuesday; and the VRC Oaks on the Thursday creating a record that is never likely to be equalled. Briseis then finished second to Pride of the Hills in the VRC Mares' Produce Stakes on the Saturday. Her major wins were an AJC Doncaster H; AJC All Aged Stakes; VRC Derby; Melbourne Cup; and VRC Oaks all as a two and three-year-old.

She then raced four times in the autumn of 1877 before being sent to stud in 1879. Briseis was to be served by King of the Ring, and while hobbled she reared up and fell over backwards, fracturing her skull. Her death was a severe loss to the Australian bloodstock industry. While not widely recalled, Briseis' feats rank alongside any of the oft-heralded greats of the Australian turf.

== Honours ==
The Briseis Tin Mine which was named after her became one of the richest mines in the southern hemisphere during the late 1890s. There is a race carrying her name at the Melbourne Cup carnival each year. The Briseis Gold Cup at Geelong is also named in her honour. The Geelong Racing Club has named the state of art Briseis Function Centre after her.
