= Warrior (racehorse) =

Australian-bred Thoroughbred racehorse

- Sire: New Warrior (GB)
- Grandsire: Pyrrhus The First (GB)
- Dam: Annie Laurie (AUS)
- Damsire: Waverley (AUS)
- Sex: Stallion
- Foaled: 1863
- Country: Australia
- Colour: Bay
- Owner: Austin Saqui (1869–1872); Phil Glenister (1872–1873)
- Trainer: Robert Sevior
- Record: 66:27-9-9

Major wins
- Melbourne Cup (1869); Melbourne Stakes (1871); VRC Queen's Plate (1871); Australian Cup (1873)
- Last updated on 31 October 2018

Warrior was an Australian bred Thoroughbred racehorse that won the 1869 Melbourne Cup at odds of 10/1.

Warrior raced 67 times for 26 wins which also included victories in the 1871 Melbourne Stakes and the 1873 Australian Cup. In 1873 the horse broke his shoulder and was destroyed while racing at Home Rule, New South Wales.

Warrior won its maiden race in its first public race at Goulburn in March 1868, winning the County Stakes the next day. At the time the horse was owned by Mr J.V. Cooper, but its next races in January 1869 were when owned by a Mr Badgery. In 1869 the horse was sold to Mr L. Uhde and was raced throughout New South Wales. In its city debut at Randwick Racecourse in autumn 1869, winning the Publican's Stakes over a mile and three-quarters. In the 1869 Metropolitan ridden by Johnny Driscoll, Warrior finished third behind Circassian, after being handicapped 8st 13lb to Circassian's weight of 7st 8lb. Two further losses that week saw the horse sold to Melbourne bookmaker Austin Saqui for £400.

Now trained in Melbourne by Robert Sevior, Warrior won the Essendon Stakes on the Saturday before the Melbourne Cup. Carrying 8st 10lb and ridden by experienced jockey Joe Morrison, Warrior easily won the 1869 Melbourne Cup ahead of The Monk. In the lead up to the Melbourne Cup, Saqui and trainer Robert Sevior had booked young jockey Andrew Mitchelson to ride Warrior in the race, but an altercation following a sluggish training gallop saw Mitchelson removed from the ride for the more experienced Joe Morrison. Saqui would later give Mitchelson £100 from his winnings as compensation.

The next day, he lost a rematch at a heavy handicap to The Monk finishing second in the Spring Handicap over a mile and a quarter. On the Saturday, Warrior was entered in the Queen's Plate over three miles. Starting equal favourite with Charon, Morrison got the horse away to lead at the first turn, and it was a two-horse between them down the Flemington straight. Charon eventually taking the win by half a length in what was described as a "splendidly-contested race."

Racing in Bendigo, Warrior finished second in the one and a half mile Bendigo Handicap behind Praetor, but beat that horse the following day to win the Sandhurst Cup over two miles.

In 1870, Warrior was saddled with 9st 0lb for the 1870 Melbourne Cup, finishing out of the placings behind winner Nimblefoot. The horse was also unplaced in the Queen's Plate in the same week.

In 1871, the horse was taken to Sydney where it was unplaced in the Metropolitan in September, winning the Randwick Plate over three miles in spring, returning to Melbourne to win the Melbourne Stakes over one and a quarter miles. In Warrior's third Melbourne Cup race, the handicap of 8st 10lb proved too great, finishing unplaced behind winner The Pearl. Warrior would win the Royal Park Stakes over two miles on the third day of the VRC Spring Meeting, and the VRC Queen's Plate on the Saturday, winning by five lengths.

On New Year's Day 1872, Warrior was awarded the win in the Canterbury Stakes over two and a half miles, after Contessa was disqualified for being under the weight. Further wins in 1872 were the Stewards' Purse, the Grand Stand Stakes, and Town Plate all held at Flemington Racecourse. Taken to Sydney for the AJC Autumn Carnival, Warrior was purchased by Phil Glenister, although would still be trained by Robert Sevior.

Entered into the 1873 Australian Cup at Flemington, Warrior defeated 1870 Melbourne Cup winner Nimblefoot. It was an unexpected win with reports stating:

Horses, like men, are mysterious creatures and the ways past understanding. Whoever expected the corky bay, as reporters are so fond of calling him, to come out in such brilliant form as he did last week, and land the Australian Cup in the fastest time yet made? He had gone off altogether, lost his pace, got stiff and camped in his sinews and muscles, and was no more the Warrior of old.

Seeking one more win to end its racing career in 1873, Glenister entered Warrior in a number of races at Mudgee, but the horse was beaten into the minor placings. Warrior's final race in May 1873 was the Home Rule Race Club Handicap over two miles. Soon after starting Warrior's foot entered a hole in the track, breaking its shoulder and was destroyed.
