= 1876 Grand National =

English steeplechase horse race

- Grand National
- Location: Aintree
- Date: 24 March 1876
- Winning horse: Regal
- Starting price: 25/1
- Jockey: Joe Cannon
- Trainer: James Jewitt
- Owner: (England) James Machell
- Conditions: Soft

The 1876 Grand National was the 38th renewal of the Grand National horse race that took place at Aintree near Liverpool, England, on 24 March 1876.

== The Course ==
Many of the fences were described this year as having been lowered to little more than hurdles.

First circuit: From the start, the runners had a long run away from the racecourse, across the lane towards Fence 1 {13} Rails and Hedge. Fence 2 {14} Rail and Ditch, Fence 3 {15} Double Rails, Fence 4 {16} Rails and Ditch, Fence 5 {17} Becher's Brook Fence 6 {18} Post and Rails, Fence 7 {19} The Canal Turn, referred to this year as the turn for Valentine's. Fence 8 {20} Valentine's Brook, Fence 9 {21} Drop, Fence 10 {22} Post and Rails.

The runners then crossed the lane at the canal bridge, where a table jump had formerly stood, to re-enter the racecourse proper, turning at the first opportunity towards the fences in front of the stands. Fence 11 Bush, Fence 12 Stand Water.

Second circuit: The runners then turned away from the Grandstands and crossed the lane again, following the first circuit until reaching the racecourse. This time the runners continued to the wider extreme of the course after crossing the lane at canal bridge before turning to run up the straight in front of the stands where two hurdles, Fence 23 and Fence 24 had to be jumped

The runners then bypassed the Bush and Stand Water inside before reaching the winning post in front of the Main Stand.

== Leading Contenders ==
3/1 Chandos was made a strong favourite, despite not having run in a steeplechase before but was to be ridden by trainer, James Jewitt.

100/8 Defence had been fourth two years earlier and provided the most experienced rider in the race, triple winner, Tommy Pickernell with his fifteenth mount.

100/8 Master Mowbray was returning for his fourth attempt at the race, having finished fourth in 1873. George Holman took the mount for the third time, his eleventh in the race.

100/8 Palm was a second ride in the race for Jerry Barnes, taking the ride from Arthur Yates when his original mount, Victoire was a late withdrawal.

100/7 Jackal had been steered around to finish fourth last year when joint favourite with Dick Marsh in the saddle. He took the mount again this year as his fifth.

100/6 Pathfinder, last year's winner was reasonably well fancied, despite his partner in victory, Tommy Pickernell opting to ride defence instead. Trainer, William Reeves took the ride as his sixth in the race.

20/1 Rye, Thyra and Zero were considered the best of the outside chances. Rye was George Waddington's twelfth attempt to win the race while Thyra was a fourth mount for Bill Daniels after Jerry Dalglish turned down the ride without explanation. Zero was the third ride in the race for Mr Rolly, the racing name for Viscount Melgund.

Five other runners were available at 25/1. Congress had gone round three times before without lasting home, each time with Ted Wilson riding, Chimney Sweep was at the same price as when finishing second two years earlier, again with Jack Jones riding. Clonave had failed to get round last year with Irish rider, Pat Gavin riding. Regal was the second string of Captain Machell, and a fourth race ride for Joe Cannon. And Shifnal was a seventh ride for Robert I'Anson.

== The Race ==
The Liberator and Master Mowbray took up the early running as Clonave refused the first fence and Gazelle and Palm followed suit at the third.

The rest of the field completed the first circuit without further incident with Shifnel going to the front as they took the water jump with Jackal, Master Mowbray, The Liberator, Chimney Sweep, Pathfinder and Congress heading the sixteen survivors, whipped in by Regal and Chandos who dropped his hind legs in the water.

Going out for the second circuit Thyra refused at the first fence while the struggling Spray pulled up before the next. Unusually for a Grand National, the field reached the Canal side of the course for the second time before encountering a faller when Zero departed when travelling well and was quickly joined by Chandos with The Liberator also coming down at the final flight before the field re-entered the racecourse.

Rye led Jackal, Shifnal, Phryne, Chimney Sweep and Regal as they crossed the anchor bridge crossing with Congress making progress. Shifnal, Congress and Regal began to draw clear turning for home with Shifnal under pressure by the time the penultimate hurdle was reached. Congress and Regal took it together but headed for the extremes of the width of the course to take the final flight, making it very difficult for the crowd to work out who was winning a tight battle. Regal was declared the winner by a neck from Congress with Shifnal three lengths back and a further four and a half lengths to Chimney Sweep with nine runners finishing in total.

== Finishing Order ==
| Position | Name | Jockey | Handicap (st-lb) | SP | Distance | Colours |
|---|---|---|---|---|---|---|
| Winner | Regal | Joe Cannon | 11-3 | 25-1 | Neck | White, blue cap |
| Second | Congress | Ted Wilson | 11-3 | 25-1 | 3 Lengths | White, orange sash and cap |
| Third | Shifnal | Robert I'Anson | 10-3 | 33/1 | four and a half lengths | Purple, white piping and cap |
| Fourth | Chimney Sweep | Jack Jones | 10-8 | 25-1 | | Blue, black cap |
| Fifth | Rye | George Waddington | 10-0 | 25-1 | | Plum, pink sleeves, quartered cap |
| Sixth | Jackal | Dick Marsh | 11-0 | 100-8 | | Black, red cap |
| Seventh | Phryne | John Goodwin | 11-3 | 20-1 | | White, brown sleeves, black cap |
| Eighth | Master Mowbray | George Holman | 11-11 | 100-8 | | Red and white hoops, red cap |
| Ninth | Pathfinder | William Reeves | 11-0 | 20-1 | | Purple and white hoops, white cap, purple trim |
| Fence 24 {Final Hurdle} | Defence | Tommy Pickernell | 11-11 | 100-8 | Pulled Up | Blue, black cap |
| Fence 23 {Penultimate Hurdle} | Gamebird | Appleton | 10-12 | 40-1 | Pulled Up | Blue, silver sleeves, black cap |
| Fence 22 {Post and Rails} | The Liberator | Tom Ryan | 10-11 | 40-1 | Fell | White, blue sleeves, black |
| Fence 21 {Drop} | Chandos | James Jewitt | 11-7 | 100-30 | Fell | White, blue cap |
| Fence 21 {Drop Fence} | Zero | Gilbert Elliott | 10-10 | 20-1 | Fell | Mustard, black cap |
| Fence 14 {Ditch and Bank} | Spray | T Cunningham | 10-2 | 40/1 | Refused | Plum, yellow sleeves, piping, quartered cap |
| Fence 13 {Rail and Hedge} | Thyra | Bill Daniels | 10-6 | 20-1 | Refused | White, navy cap |
| Fence 3 {Double Rails} | Gazelle | Flutter | 10-9 | 40-1 | Refused | Pink, blue cap |
| Fence 3 {Double Rails} | Palm | Jerry Barnes | 11-0 | 100-8 | Refused | Red |
| Fence 1 {Rail and Hedge} | Clonave | Pat Gavin | 11-5 | 22-1 | Refused | Black, white sash and cap |
