= John Day (jockey) =

Australian Jockey and champion pedestrian

Johnny Day
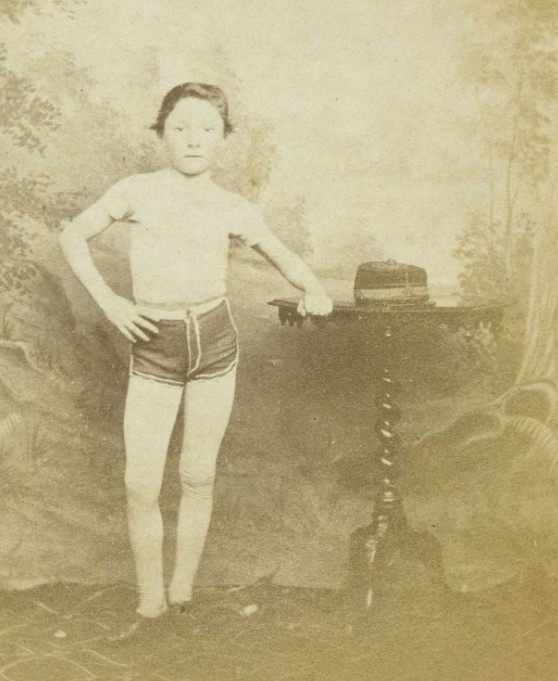
- Master Johnny Day - Unknown artist - c. 1866 - National Portrait Gallery Canberra
- Born: John Day Bowles; 20 June 1856; Melbourne, Colony of Victoria
- Died: 10 June 1885 (age 27); Inglewood, Victoria, Australia
- Other name: John Bowles Day
- Occupations: Pedestrian, Jockey
- Spouse(s): Mary-Ann Mason, married 1879

John Day (1856–1885) was an Australian jockey, remembered for winning the 1870 Melbourne Cup. As a child he was a leading figure in the sport of pedestrianism.

== History ==
At age eight, Day was touted as Australian champion pedestrian, having beaten all comers in the colony. By November 1864 he was touring with the "Australian Troupe" variety artistes, demonstrating speed walking. In 1865 he was taken to England aboard Royal Standard to compete against some of the leading pedestrian athletes of the day. Such races were popular subjects for gambling, and he was nine years old, 3 feet 10 inches (117 cm) high, and weighed 54 pounds (24 kg), In 1867, he completed 300 laps of a circuit created in the Royal Victoria Theatre, Sydney, a total of 5 miles (8.0 km), in under 50 minutes It is not known whether this exhibition was provided for gambling purposes, but it was said that his backers did not receive the profits they expected from exhibiting him. Another challenge, to walk seven miles within the hour, was staged at the track attached to Goyder's Red House hotel in Northcote. It started at £30 to £10, and Day was loudly supported each time he passed the judge's stand, but when it was clear he had no prospect of succeeding, one sympathizer invaded the track and carried him away.

Day is reported as taking up horse-racing as a jockey in the late 1860s, but details are hard to find. Dubbed the "Wonder Walker", he rode Nimblefoot to victory in the Hotham Handicap of 5 November 1870 and the same combination was judged winner of the 1870 Melbourne Cup in a very close finish, ahead of Lapdog, a record which held until 1876.

After a dispute resulting from Day's abscondment from the trainer William Lang soon after the Melbourne Cup, Day was required to return to his apprenticeship and continued to ride horses until at least 1877 when he suffered a bad fall in a ride in Yarrawonga.

Day died in 1885 in Inglewood Hospital of Addison's disease.

== Legacy ==
A fictionalised account of Day's post cup life has been written. Robert Drewe's book 'Nimblefoot', although historical fiction is based on the life of Johnny Day.
