= The Barb =

Australian Thoroughbred racehorse

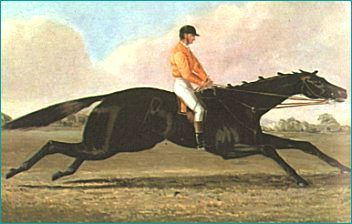
- Sire: Sir Hercules (1843)
- Grandsire: Cap-A-Pie (GB)
- Dam: Fair Ellen (aka Young Gulnare)
- Damsire: Doctor (GB)
- Sex: Stallion
- Foaled: 1863
- Country: Australia
- Colour: Black
- Breeder: George Lee
- Owner: John Tait
- Trainer: James Ashworth
- Record: 23: 15-2-1
- Earnings: over £18,000

Major wins
- Nursery Stakes (1865); AJC Derby (1866); Melbourne Cup (1866); Australasian Champion Stakes (1866); Launceston Town Plate (1867); Port Phillip Stakes (1867); Sydney Cup (1868, 1869); Craven Plate (1868); VRC Royal Park Stakes (1868); AJC Metropolitan Handicap (1868); Queens Plate (1868)

Honours
- Australian Racing Hall of Fame
- Last updated on 17 May 2009

The Barb (1863–1888) was an Australian bred Thoroughbred racehorse, famed for winning the 1866 Melbourne Cup, the Sydney Cup twice, and other quality races. He was bred by George Lee and foaled in 1863 at Leeholme, near Bathurst, New South Wales.

== Pedigree ==
The Barb was by Sir Hercules, his dam Fair Ellen (also known as Young Gulnare) was by Doctor (GB). He was a brother to Barbarian (sire of the Melbourne Cup winner, Zulu) and Barbelle (AJC Doncaster Handicap, VRC Flying Stakes (three times) and Sydney Cup). Sir Hercules (by Cap-a-Pie, a son of the St Leger winner The Colonel) was one of the best colonial sires, having sired 18 stakeswinners for 45 stakeswins including, Yattendon, Cossack and Zoe. The Barb was sold for 200 guineas as a yearling.

== Racing record ==
He was owned and trained by "Honest John" Tait, who owned and trained three other Melbourne Cup winners: Glencoe, The Pearl and The Quack. The Barb proved to be highly strung and temperamental. At his first appearance he threw his rider and bolted and because of this side of his nature was known as the "Black Demon". As a spring three-year-old, The Barb won the sixth AJC Derby by two lengths at his first start from a spell. The Barb started favourite in the Melbourne Cup and went on to win by a short head. The Barb continued to show he was the best horse in Australia and won the Sydney Cup in 1868 and 1869 (under the huge weight of 10 st 8 lb). As a five-year-old The Barb was undefeated in seven starts. In all The Barb won 15 of his 23 starts. The Barb is also listed in the Millers Guide as running 2nd in The Shorts at Randwick in 1875.

== Stud record ==
After The Barb was retired from racing, owner John Tait sold him to Charles Reynolds who sent him to stand at Tocal Stud in the Hunter Valley. As a sire, The Barb was unable to produce offspring to equal his own ability. His best horses were:

- The Barber, QTC Moreton Handicap
- Strathearn, QTC Brisbane Cup
- Tocal, VRC Royal Park Stakes, AJC All Aged Stakes

The Barb was an acceptable sire of broodmares and a granddaughter was the dam of Wallace, Carbine's best racehorse son in Australia.

He died at the age of twenty-five in 1888 at Bowler's stud, Mitta Mitta.

Following its formation, The Barb was inducted in the Australian Racing Hall of Fame in 2004.
