= 1876 Melbourne Cup =

Annual horse race in Victoria, Australia

- Melbourne Cup
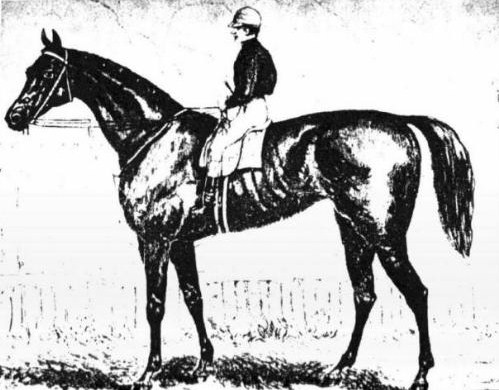
- Illustration of winning horse Briseis
- Location: Flemington Racecourse
- Date: 7 November 1876
- Distance: 2 miles
- Winning horse: Briseis
- Winning time: 3:36.25
- Final odds: 13/2
- Jockey: Peter St Albans
- Trainer: James Wilson
- Owner: James Wilson
- Surface: Turf
- Attendance: ≈75,000

The 1876 Melbourne Cup was a two-mile handicap horse race which took place on Tuesday, 7 November 1876.

This year was the sixteenth running of the Melbourne Cup. The running of this edition of the race is most famous for winning jockey Peter St Albans, whose birth name was Peter Bowden, who became the youngest Melbourne Cup winning jockey at 12 (he was actually a few days shy of his 11th birthday). St Albans taking the ride for the Cup after regular jockey Tom Hales could not make the allocated weight for the horse.

The winning horse Briseis, had previously won the Doncaster Handicap at two-years-old, won by two lengths and was the first of three fillies to win the Melbourne Cup. During the 1876 Victoria Racing Club (VRC) Spring Meeting, she also won Victoria Derby on the Saturday before the Melbourne Cup, also winning the VRC Oaks following the Cup on the Thursday. Briseis was a foal of 1863 Melbourne Cup runner-up Musidora.

Briseis won in a field of 33 and "the boy who rode the winner was carried around the pack and is the hero of the day" reported the Australasian Sketcher.

Betting on the race was initially fairly open, with James Wilson's trained horse Feu d'Artifice eventually backed in as a short-priced favourite ahead of Spark. There were 72 entries accepted for the race, while a total of 42 runners were declared for the race, with a field of 33 eventually starting the race, then the largest field in the race's history. Owing to its stablemate's win in the previous race, Torchlight was well backed in the betting ring as one of the favourite outsiders. Rapid Bay and Valentia were withdrawn on the morning of the race, following the withdrawal of boom colt Newminster due to illness.

Following the start, Janitor was at the front of the field at the first turn, but as the field traversed the back straight, observers lost sight of the lead horses owing to the dust being kicked up by the field. Eventually Spring Jack was found to be leading the pack, with Aldinga and Timothy near the front. Spring Jack maintained its lead at the far turn, looking to repeat the feats of 1874 winner Haricot to lead from near the start to the end of the race. Before the final turn, Spring Jack had run its race, while the favourite Feu d'Artifice had tried to run on but began to tire. Irish Stew took up the lead as the runners before the runners entered the Flemington straight, giving way to Sibyl to lead as the field made the final turn, but it was Briseis who dashed clear down the home stretch well ahead of Sibyl who finished strongly to grab second place, followed by Timothy. The time of the race was reasonably fast compared to previous editions of the Melbourne Cup, although the horses might have been hampered by the windy and dusty conditions. Previous year's runner up Richmond racing under the new moniker of Clifton after its ownership was transferred to Governor of New South Wales Sir Hercules Robinson, was pulled up and did not finish.

The win was the second Melbourne Cup for trainer James Wilson, cementing the St Albans Stud as one of the leading stables of the time, although his two sons had grown too much to continue to ride for the stable.

Newspapers of the time praised the "racing festival" as organised by the VRC, claiming that it:

has ceased to be a local or metropolitan pastime, for the whole colony participates in it. Year by year, as railway communication has extended to the districts which were previously unconnected with it by the iron road, the number of persons drawn hitherward to witness the most popular event upon the turf has been steadily increasing; and to judge from the subject of the streets during the last few days, the concourse of visitors on the present occasion will be greater than at any corresponding period previously. There is evidently something in the national character which predisposes all classes of the community to feel and exhibit an almost passionate interest in those contests of power and speed which are capable of bringing together a more immense multitude of people than any other spectacle which can be presented to them.

== Full results ==
This is the list of placegetters for the 1876 Melbourne Cup.

| Place | Horse | Age Gender | Jockey | Weight | Trainer | Owner | Odds | Margin |
|---|---|---|---|---|---|---|---|---|
| 1 | Briseis | 3y f | Peter St. Albans | 6 st 4 lb (39.9 kg) | James Wilson | James Wilson | 13/2 | 2 lengths |
| 2 | Sibyl | 3y f | Phelps | 6 st 0 lb (38.1 kg) | Robert Standish Sevior | Robert Standish Sevior | 25/1 | 1 length |
| 3 | Timothy | 4y h | Donald Nicholson | 7 st 0 lb (44.5 kg) | Etienne de Mestre | Etienne de Mestre | 10/1 | |
| 4 | Impudence | 4y h | William Enderson | 7 st 9 lb (48.5 kg) | Tom Jordan | Gabriel Bennett | 14/1 | |
| 5 | Emulation | 4y h | Murphy | 7 st 8 lb (48.1 kg) | Tom Jordan | Gabriel Bennett | 20/1 | |
| 6 | Spring Jack | Aged g | Taylor | 5 st 7 lb (34.9 kg) | | William Samuel Cox | 50/1 | |
| 7 | Sterling | 5y h | T. Wilson | 8 st 6 lb (53.5 kg) | William Lang | Thomas Ivory | 16/1 | |
| 8 | Irish Stew | 4y g | Paddy Piggott | 6 st 8 lb (41.7 kg) | | James J. Miller | 8/1 | |
| 9 | Aldinga | 3y c | George Williams | 6 st 0 lb (38.1 kg) | | Samuel Gardiner | 14/1 | |
| 10 | Imperial | 7y g | William Yeomans | 8 st 10 lb (55.3 kg) | | William Samuel Cox | 12/1 | |
| 11 | Pride Of The Hills | 3y c | Spooner | 6 st 4 lb (39.9 kg) | | Mr T. Reid | 50/1 | |
| —N/a | Sultan | 6y h | Brickwood Colley | 8 st 6 lb (53.5 kg) | James Wilson | Thomas Chirnside & Andrew Chirnside | 16/1 | |
| —N/a | Southern Cross | 5y m | John Kavanagh | 8 st 6 lb (53.5 kg) | Frank Leng | Frank Leng | 33/1 | |
| —N/a | Dilke | 5y h | Robert Batty | 7 st 12 lb (49.9 kg) (Note: Was supposed to carry 7st 10lb) | Stephen Moon | John Cleeland | 20/1 | |
| —N/a | Mountaineer | 6y g | Hughes | 7 st 9 lb (48.5 kg) | | William Yuillie Jr | 50/1 | |
| —N/a | Feu d'Artifice | 5y m | Tom Hales | 7 st 5 lb (46.7 kg) | James Wilson | Herbert Power | 4/1 fav. | |
| —N/a | Janitor | 4y h | E. Willis | 7 st 4 lb (46.3 kg) | | James J. Miller | 50/1 | |
| —N/a | Spark | 4y h | E. Bancroft | 6 st 12 lb (43.5 kg) | | Mr J. Arthur | 10/1 | |
| —N/a | Venus | 6y m | T. Aspinall | 6 st 12 lb (43.5 kg) | | John Crozier Jr | 50/1 | |
| —N/a | Gas | 3y f | J. Heywood | 5 st 9 lb (35.8 kg) (Note: Was supposed to carry 5st 7lb) | | Mr J. Paterson | 50/1 | |
| —N/a | Onyx | 4y m | Charles Ivemy | 6 st 10 lb (42.6 kg) | | Charles Brown Fisher | 33/1 | |
| —N/a | Nunnykirk | 4y g | Kirk | 6 st 8 lb (41.7 kg) | | Thomas Chirnside & Andrew Chirnside | 33/1 | |
| —N/a | Torchlight | 5y h | Samuel Davis | 6 st 11 lb (43.1 kg) (Note: Was supposed to carry 6st 8lb) | | William Yuillie Jr | 20/1 | |
| —N/a | Bella | 4y m | W. Motton Jr | 6 st 8 lb (41.7 kg) | | William Field | 50/1 | |
| —N/a | Fisherman | 4y h | Power | 6 st 8 lb (41.7 kg) | | Mr J. Keighran | 25/1 | |
| —N/a | Vain Hope | Aged g | Nolan | 6 st 8 lb (41.7 kg) | | Mr J. Hill | 25/1 | |
| —N/a | Kismet | 4y m | Hincks | 6 st 6 lb (40.8 kg) | | Mr A. Bowman | 50/1 | |
| —N/a | The Deer | Aged g | Snarey | 6 st 7 lb (41.3 kg) (Note: Was supposed to carry 6st 4lb) | | Mr L. Barnard | 25/1 | |
| —N/a | Electricity | 3y c | Thomson | 6 st 1 lb (38.6 kg) | | Mr R. Holland | 25/1 | |
| —N/a | Glengarry | 3y c | King | 5 st 10 lb (36.3 kg) | | Louis Lawrence Smith | 50/1 | |
| —N/a | Disraeli | Aged g | Braithwaite | 5 st 7 lb (34.9 kg) | | Mr E. Hunt | 50/1 | |
| —N/a | Gentility | 3y f | Emsworth | 5 st 7 lb (34.9 kg) | | Mr D.D. Simpson | 50/1 | |
| PU | Clifton (late Richmond) | 4y h | Ramsay | 8 st 0 lb (50.8 kg) | Tom Lamond | Hercules Robinson | 50/1 | |
| SCR | Valentia | 4y h | —N/a | 7 st 7 lb (47.6 kg) | Tom Lamond | Hercules Robinson | | |
| SCR | Canterbury | 4y h | —N/a | 7 st 4 lb (46.3 kg) | —N/a | Charles Brown Fisher | | |
| SCR | McGregor | Aged h | —N/a | 6 st 10 lb (42.6 kg) | —N/a | Mr E. Paget | | |
| SCR | Gloom | 6y g | —N/a | 6 st 4 lb (39.9 kg) | —N/a | William Pearson | | |
| SCR | Volo | 3y c | —N/a | 6 st 0 lb (38.1 kg) | —N/a | Mr A. Stewart | | |
| SCR | El Moro | 3y c | —N/a | 5 st 12 lb (37.2 kg) | —N/a | Samuel Gardiner | | |
| SCR | Rapid Bay | 4y h | —N/a | | James Wilson | James Wilson | | |
| SCR | Newminster | 3y c | —N/a | | William E. Dakin | Thomas Chirnside & Andrew Chirnside | | |

== Prizemoney ==
First prize £1705, second prize £50, third prize £20.

For the first time since 1867, a one-off all gold trophy was presented to the winning owner by retiring chairman of the VRC James Blackwood. Geelong goldsmith Edward Fischer, an immigrant from Austria, produced the first Australian-made trophy for the race. It was an Etruscan shape with two handles. One side depicted a horse race with the grandstand and hill of Flemington in the background. The opposite side had the words "Melbourne Cup, 1876" and the name of the winning horse.

== Shipwreck of the City of Melbourne ==
On 11 September 1876, months out from the Melbourne Cup, a total of nine horses were killed aboard the steamship City of Melbourne as the boat travelled from Sydney back to Melbourne ahead of the spring racing season.

As the ship approached Jervis Bay, a strong storm hit the ship as well-regarded jockey and horseman Joe Morrison implored the ship's captain B. Paddle to return to Sydney to protect the valuable cargo of racehorses. In heavy seas, the ship's steering wheel broke, forcing the small crew to fashion a temporary steering gear. In poor visibility, the captain took the ship further out to sea as a number of horses suffered either catastrophic injuries or drowned. Among the horses killed were Melbourne Cup fancies Nemesis (winner of the 1876 Metropolitan) and Robin Hood as well as a number of valuable colts and fillies. Heading back to Sydney after two further days at sea, nine of the 11 horses being transported had died, only the efforts of Morrison and the other horsemen on board saving the lives of the two remaining horses. (Note: One of the horses saved later raced under the moniker Robinson Crusoe owing to surviving the voyage.)

Melbourne bookmarkers later presented Paddle with a coin-filled purse in apparent gratitude for saving them from paying out punters who had backed horses that had died on the fateful voyage.

== See also ==
- Melbourne Cup
- List of Melbourne Cup winners
- Victoria Racing Club
- Australian Racing Hall of Fame
