= Glencoe II =

Australian Thoroughbred racehorse

Glencoe
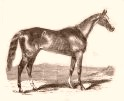
- Sire: Lord of the Hills*
- Grandsire: Touchstone
- Dam: Queen of Clubs
- Damsire: Cossack*
- Sex: Stallion
- Foaled: 1864
- Country: Australia
- Colour: Chestnut
- Breeder: Richard Dines
- Owner: John Tait; J. Bailey
- Trainer: John Tait

Major wins
- AJC Sires Produce Stakes (1867); VRC Queens Plate (1868); Melbourne Cup (1868); VRC All-Aged Stakes (1868, 1870); AJC Australian St Leger Stakes (1868); Melbourne Stakes (1869); Craven Plate (1869); AJC All Aged Stakes (1869)
- Last updated on 14 October 2009

Glencoe (foaled 1864) was a notable Australian bred Thoroughbred racehorse who won the 1868 Melbourne Cup and eight other principal races.

== Pedigree ==
Glencoe was chestnut stallion by the imported Lord of the Hills (by Touchstone), his dam Queen of Clubs was by the colonial stallion, Cossack out of Queen of Hearts by Dover (GB). He descended from a now extinct colonial family, C33, which did not produce any other winners of note.

== Racing record ==
Under the colours of his breeder/owner, Richard Dines, Glencoe won the 1867 AJC Sires' Produce Stakes and was then sold to prominent horseman, "Honest" John Tait.

In 1868 Glencoe won the AJC St Leger Stakes, VRC All-Aged Stakes and VRC Queens Plate. John Tait nominated three of his horses for the 1868 Melbourne Cup, the raging favourite The Barb, Bylong and Glencoe. He later scratched The Barb and backed Glencoe with Bylong drifting right out of the betting market. Glencoe defeated twenty-five other horses to win the Melbourne Cup comfortably and win a fortune for Tait.

Glencoe later became a temperamental racehorse and turned in some bad performances which led to Tait selling him to the Victorian, J. Bailey.

Glencoe raced as a six-year-old, retiring as a winner of many of his country's most important races. At stud, he proved not to be successful.
