= Queen Elizabeth Stakes (VRC) =

Victoria Racing Club horse race at Flemington Racecourse, Melbourne

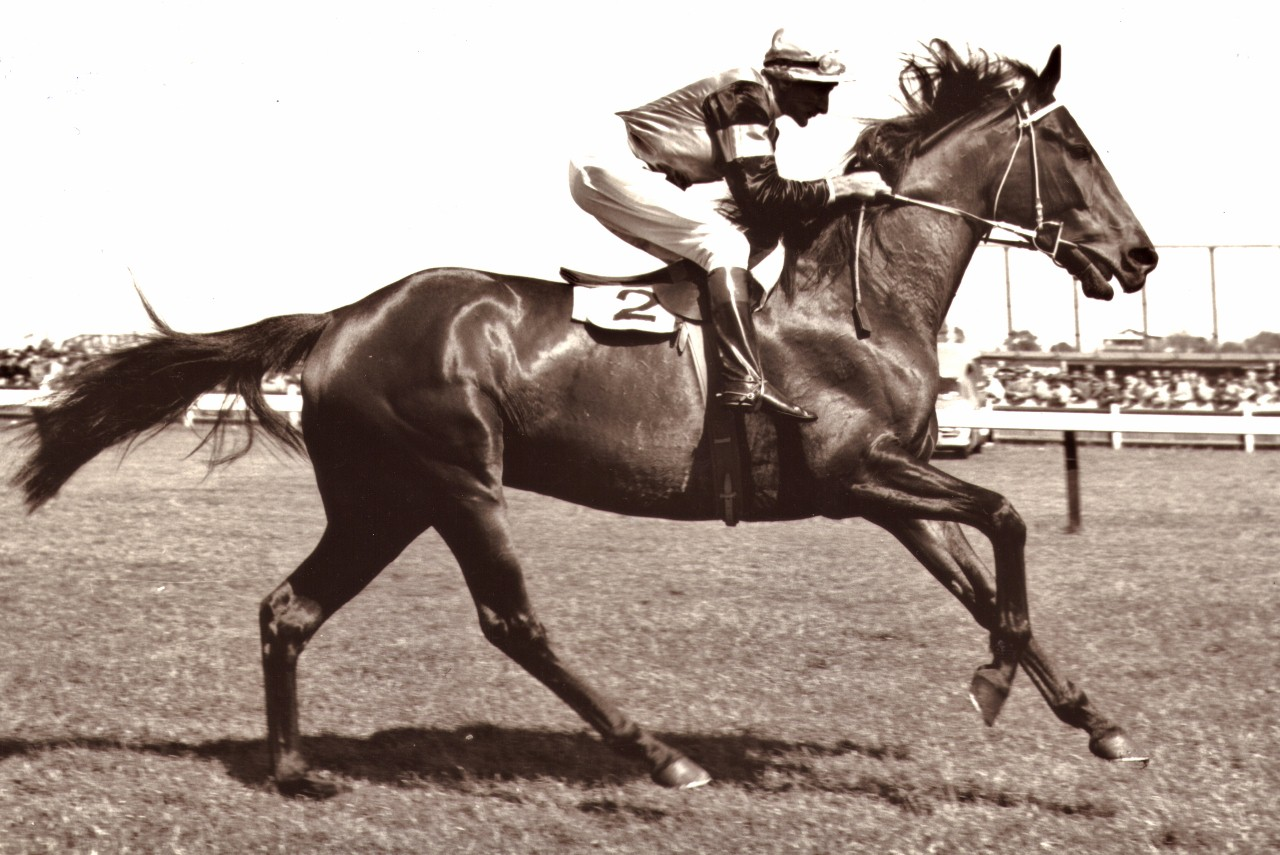
- 1954 & 1955 winner – Rising Fast
- Class: Group 3
- Location: Flemington Racecourse, Melbourne, Australia
- Inaugurated: 1854
- Race type: Thoroughbred - flat

Race information
- Distance: 2,600 metres
- Surface: Turf
- Track: Left-handed
- Qualification: Three year olds and older that are not maidens
- Weight: Quality handicap
- Purse: A$300,000 (2026)

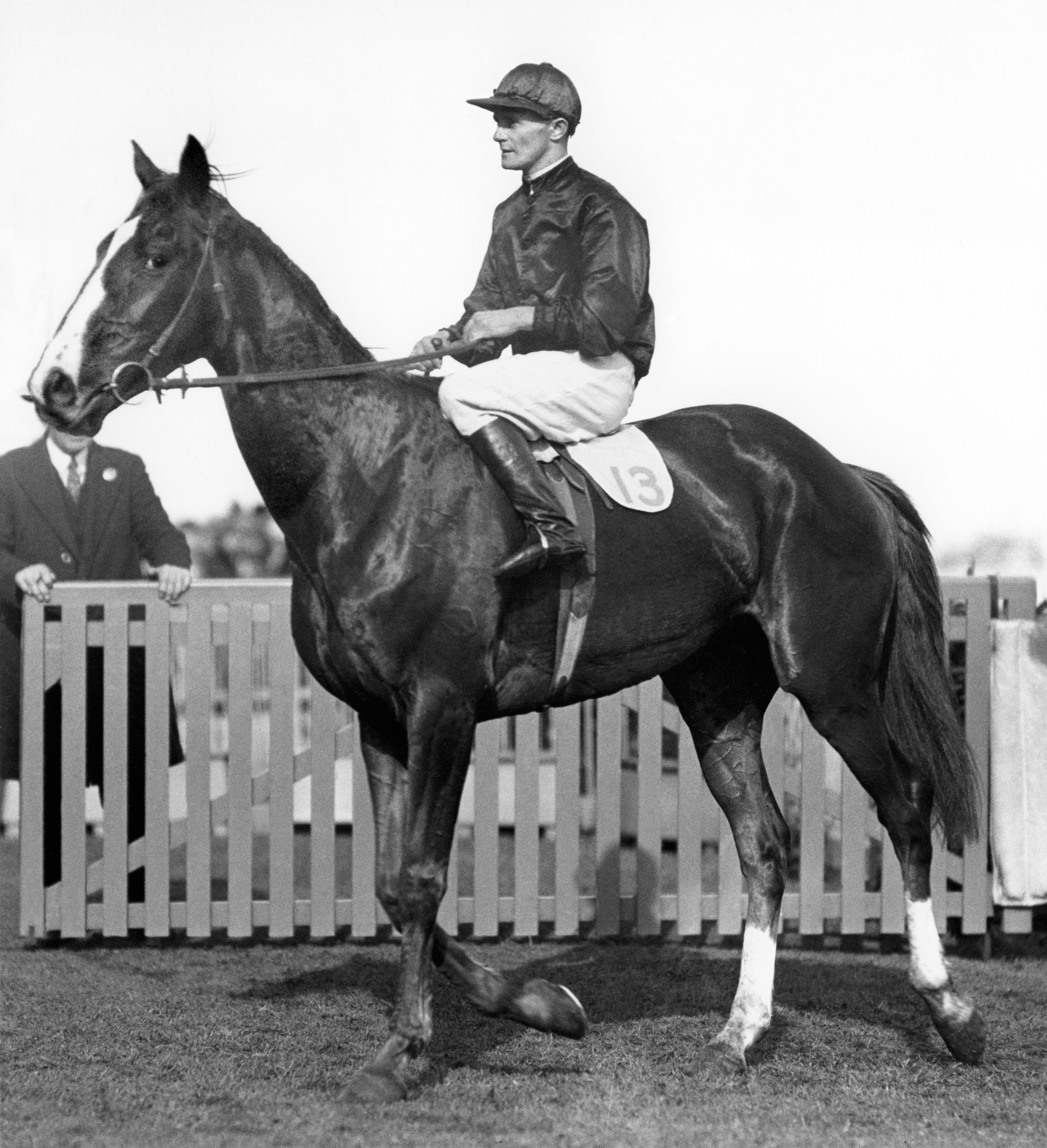
Rogilla, 1933 winner George Robinson up

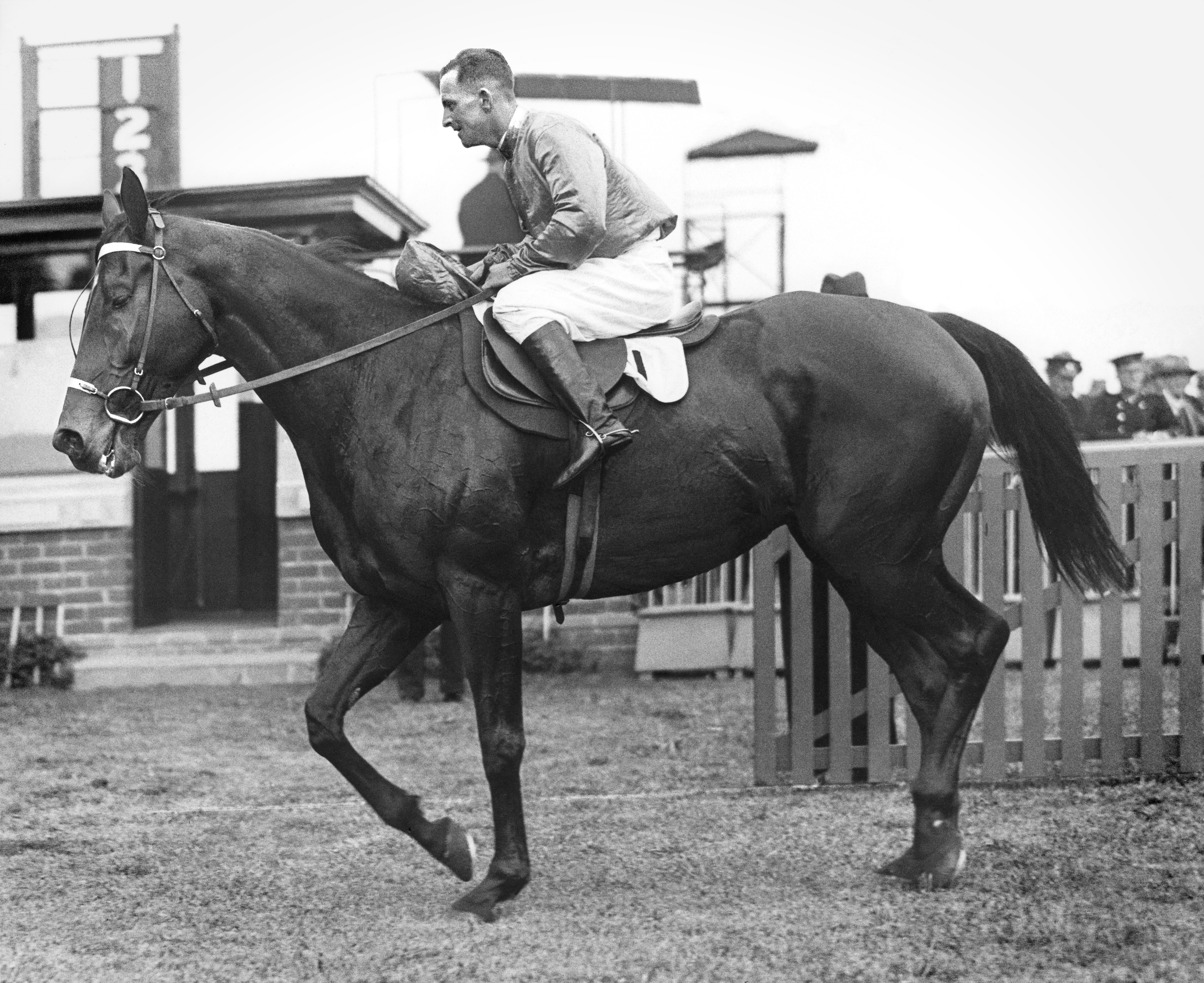
Amounis, 1929 jockey Harold Jones up

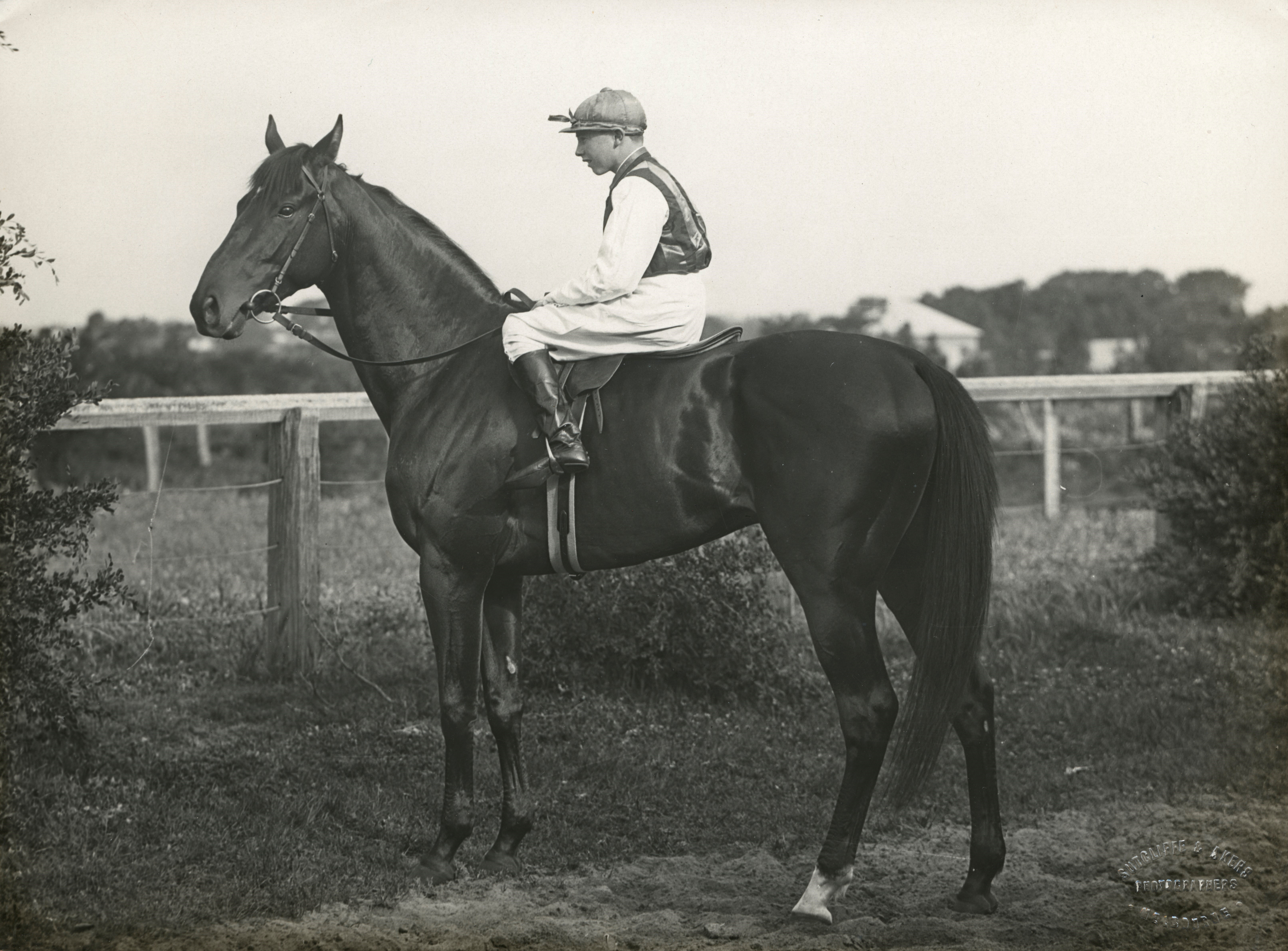
Lavendo, 1916 winner Frank Dempsey up

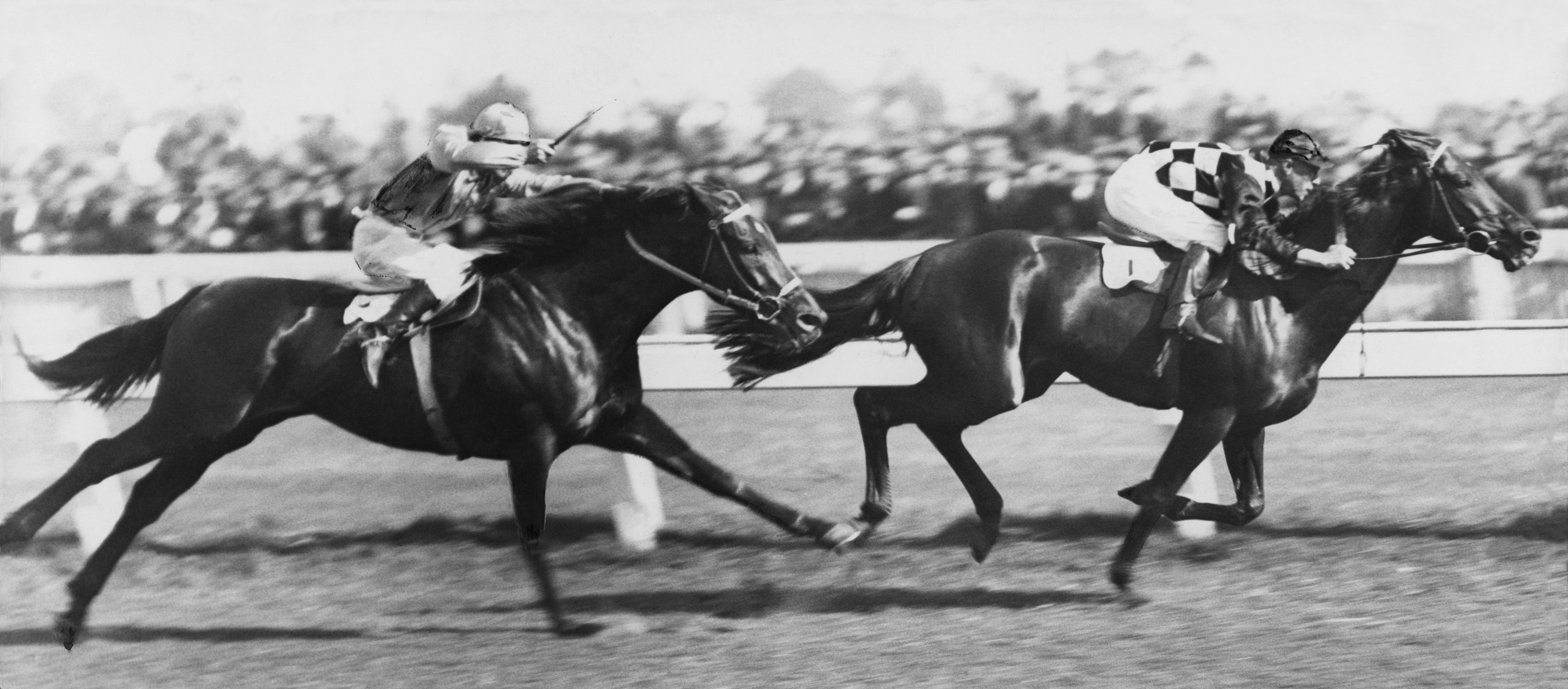
Gothic, 1928 winner

The Queen Elizabeth Stakes, first known as Queen's Plate (1854-1872), and then by various other names at different times in its history (Queen's Cup, Flemington Plate, Canterbury Plate, C.B. Fisher Plate), is an Australian horse race run in Melbourne, Victoria. It is a registered Victoria Racing Club Group 3 Thoroughbred horse race for horses aged three years old and over, under quality handicap conditions, over a distance of 2,600 m (1.6 mi) at Flemington Racecourse on the last day of the VRC Spring Carnival in early November.

== History ==
=== Distance ===
- 1854–1874 – 3 miles (~4800 metres)
- 1875–1876 – 2 miles (~3200 metres)
- 1877–1878 - 2 1/4 miles (~3600 metres)
- 1879 – 2 miles (~3200 metres)
- 1880 - 2 1/4 miles (~3600 metres)
- 1881–1884 – 2 miles (~3200 metres)
- 1885 - 2 1/2 miles (~4000 metres)
- 1886–1887 – 2 miles (~3200 metres)
- 1888 – 3 miles (~4800 metres)
- 1889 - 2 1/4 miles (~3600 metres)
- 1890–1894 – 2 miles (~3200 metres)
- 1895–1971 - 1 1/2 miles (~2400 metres)
- 1972 – 2400 metres
- 1973–1993 – 2500 metres
- 1994 – 2530 metres
- 1995 – 2500 metres
- 1996 – 2531 metres
- 1997–2005 – 2500 metres
- 2006–2007 – 2520 metres
- 2008–2009 – 2500 metres
- 2010 onwards – 2600 metres

=== Grade ===
- 1854–1978 - Principal Race
- 1979–2004 - Group 2
- 2005 onwards - Group 3

=== Name ===
- 1854-1872 - Queen's Plate
- 1873-1874 - Flemington Plate
- 1875-1894 - Canterbury Plate
- 1895–1968 - C.B. Fisher Plate
- 1969 - Queen's Cup
- 1970–1973 - C.B. Fisher Plate
- 1974 - Queen's Cup
- 1975–1978 - C.B. Fisher Plate
- 1979–1984 - Queen Elizabeth Stakes
- 1985 - Queen's Cup
- 1986–2009 - Queen Elizabeth Stakes
- 2010 - Queen's Cup
- 2011–2014 - Queen Elizabeth Stakes
- 2015 - Queen's Cup
- 2016 - 2021 - Queen Elizabeth Stakes
- 2022 - Queen's Cup
- 2023 - present - Queen Elizabeth Stakes

=== 1951 racebook ===
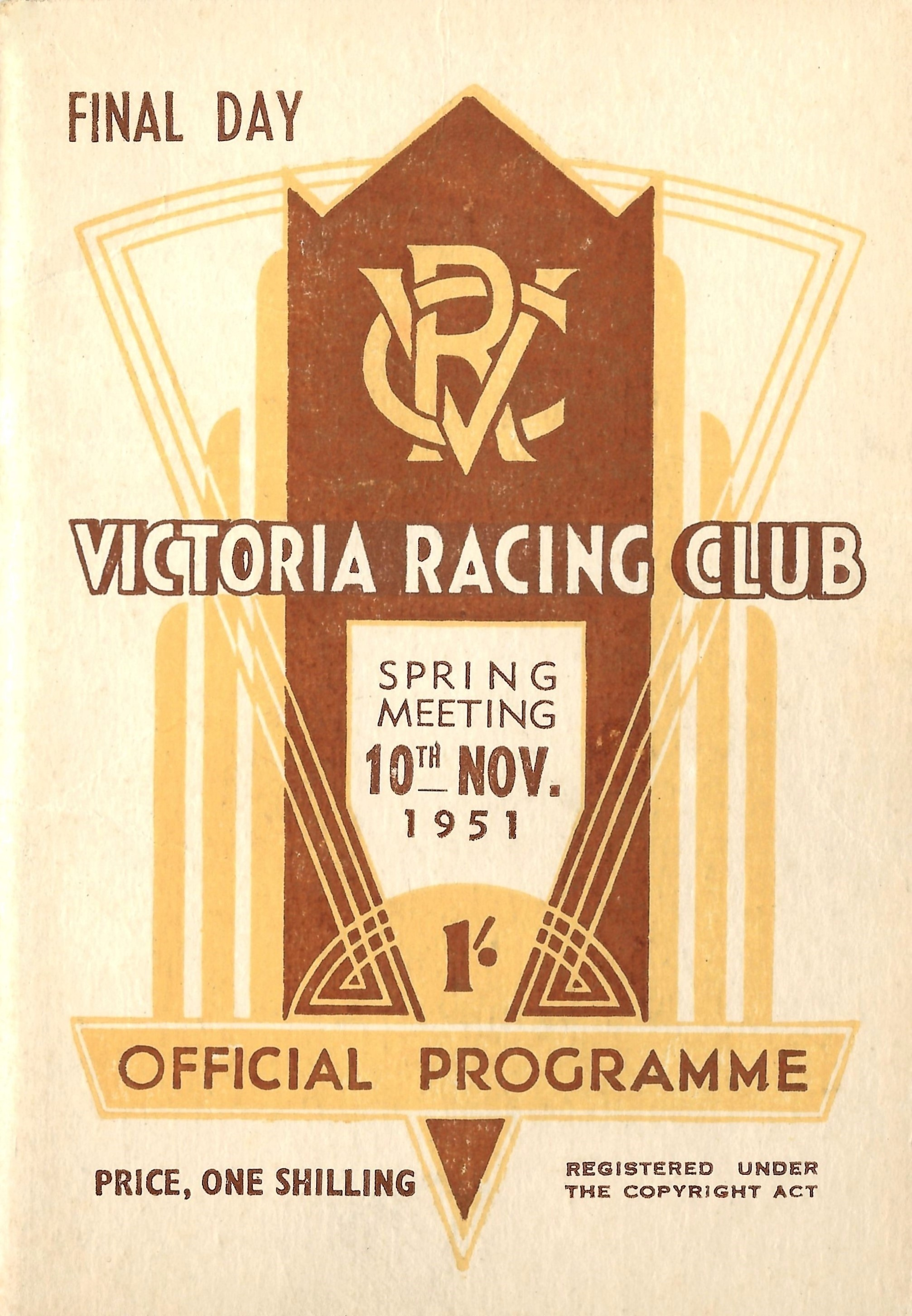
1951 VRC C.B. Fisher Plate racebook front cover

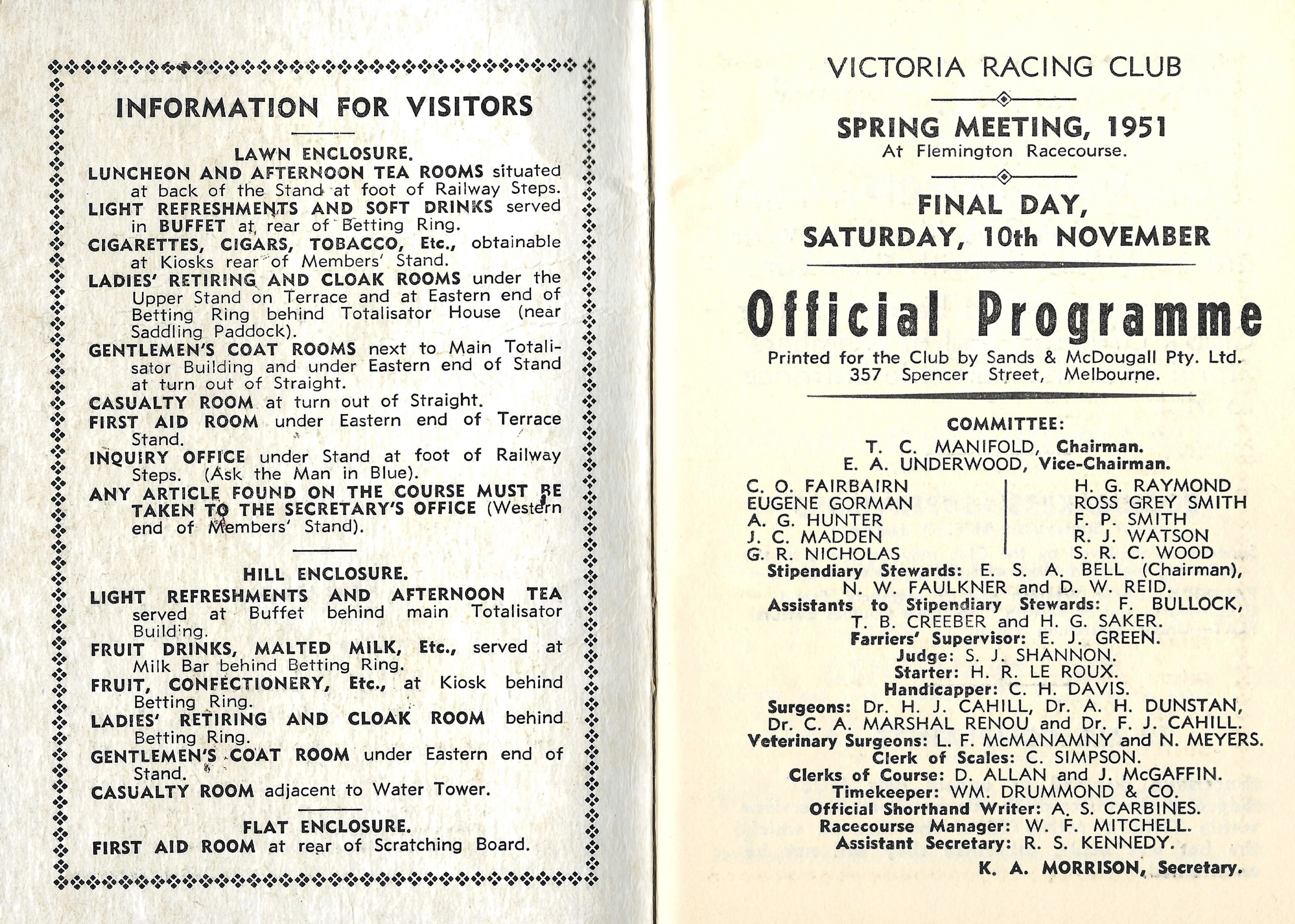
1951 VRC C.B. Fisher Plate showing raceday officials

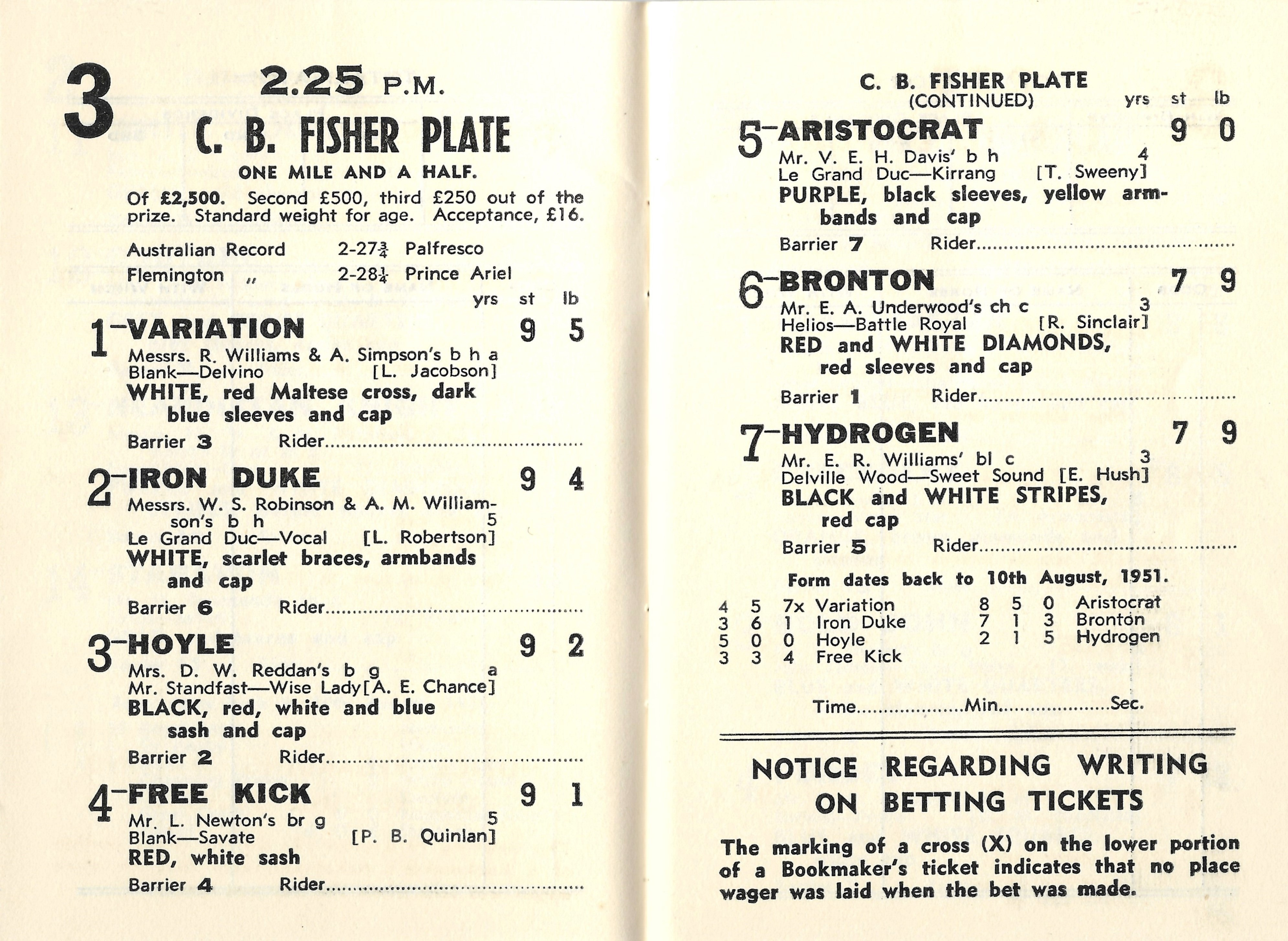
1951 VRC C.B. Fisher Plate starters and results showing the winner, Bronton

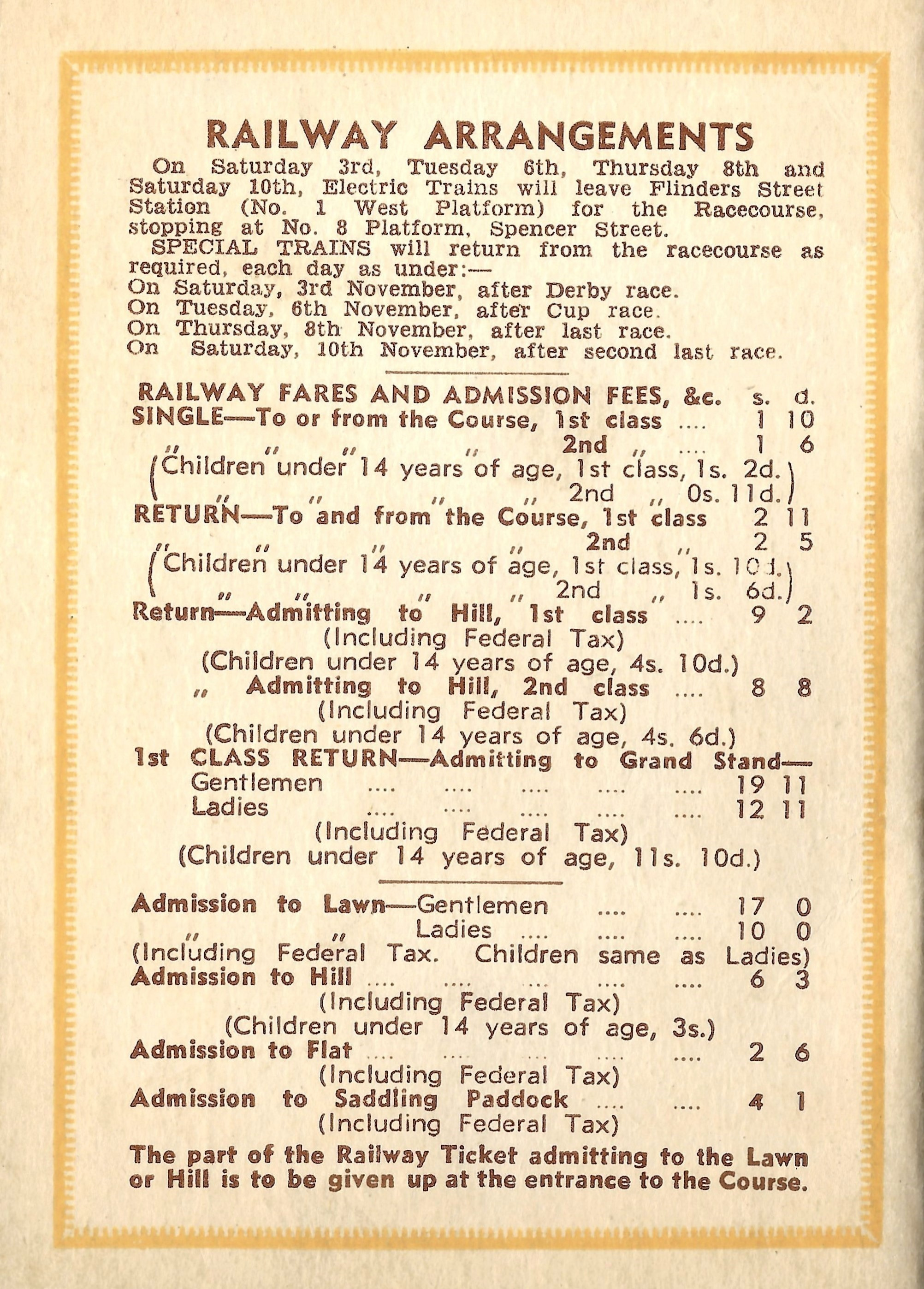
Back cover showing railway arrangements and charges at the entrance gates

=== Gallery of noted winners ===
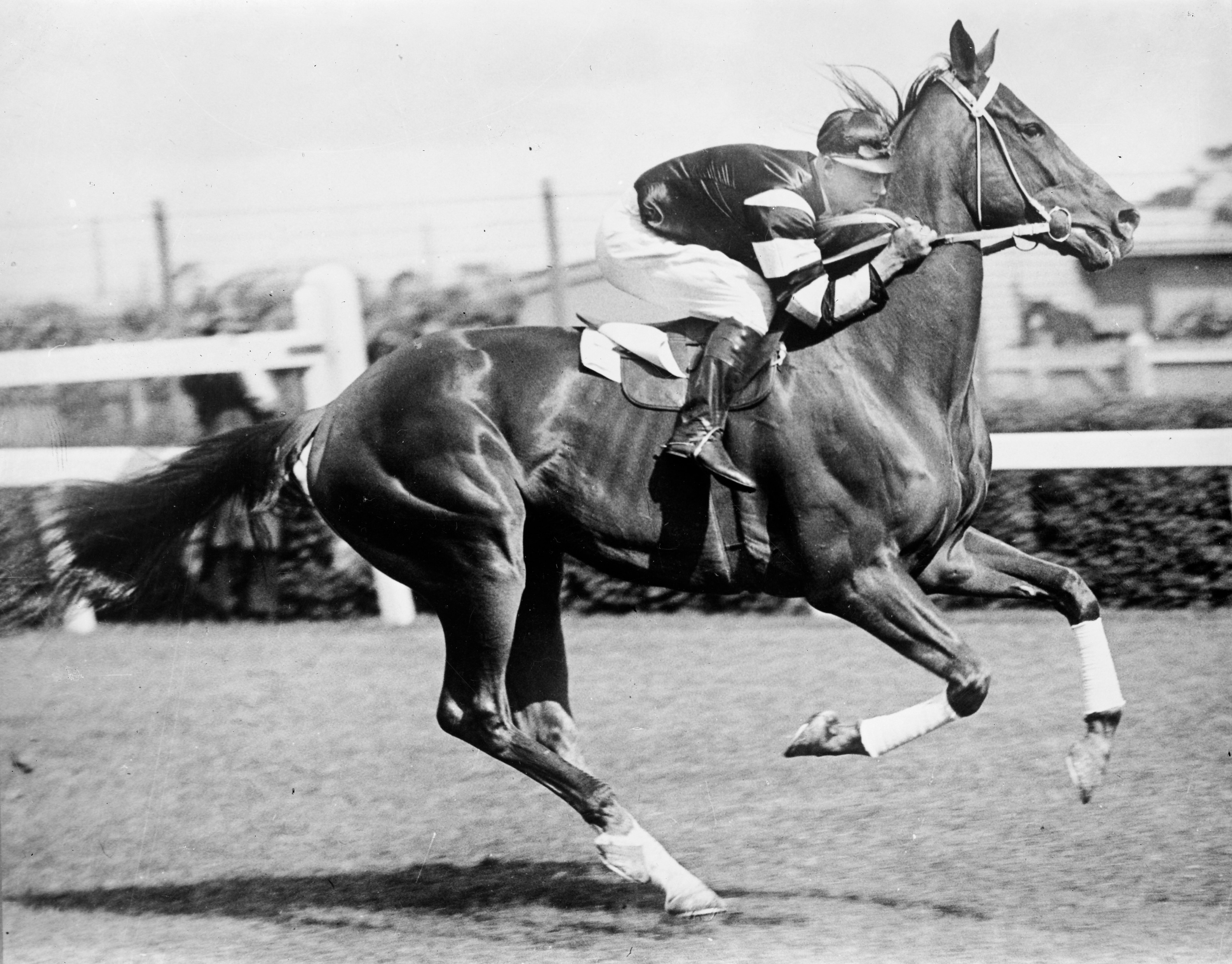
Phar Lap, 1930 winner

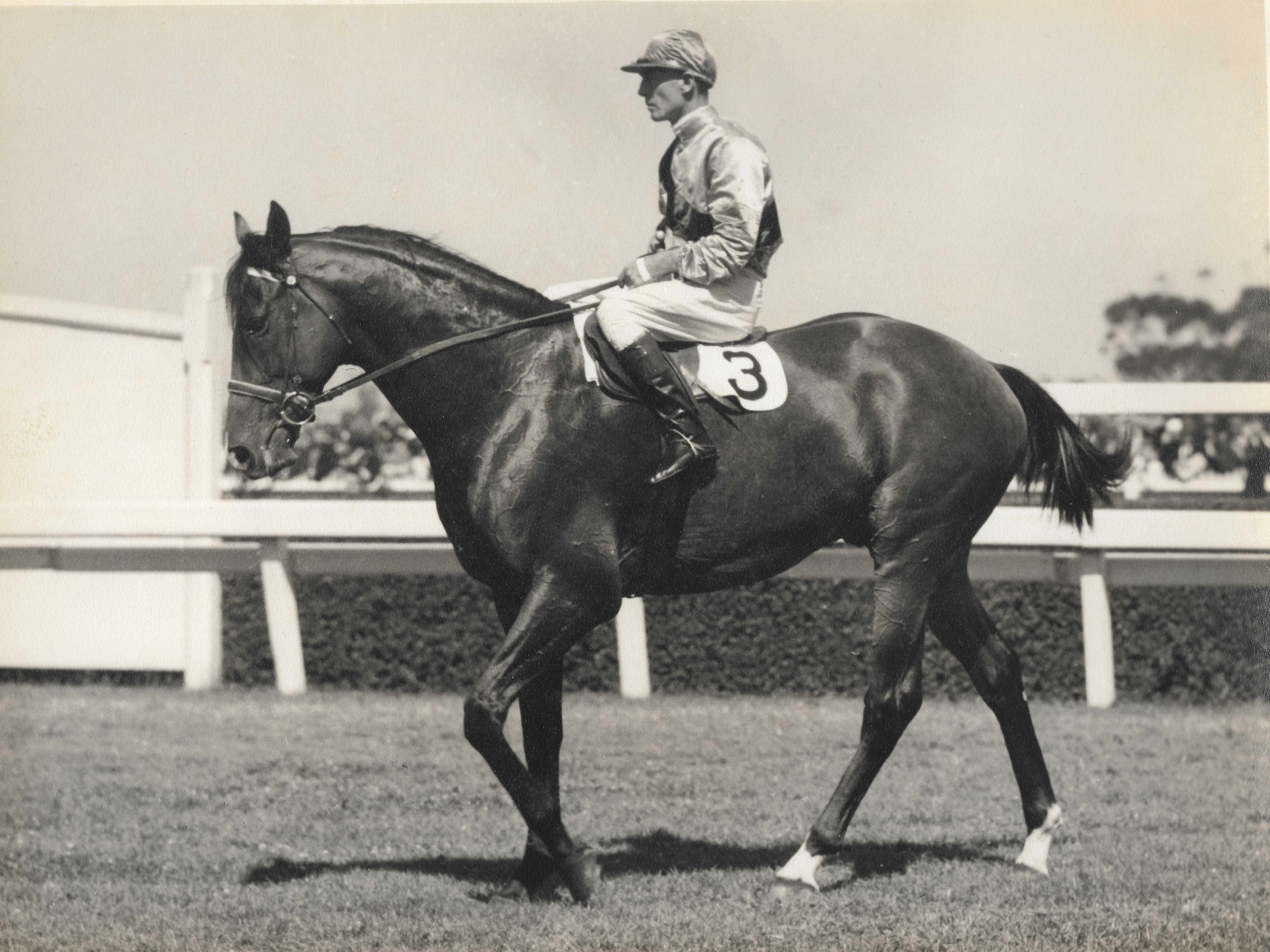
High Caste, 1939, 1940 & 1941 winner

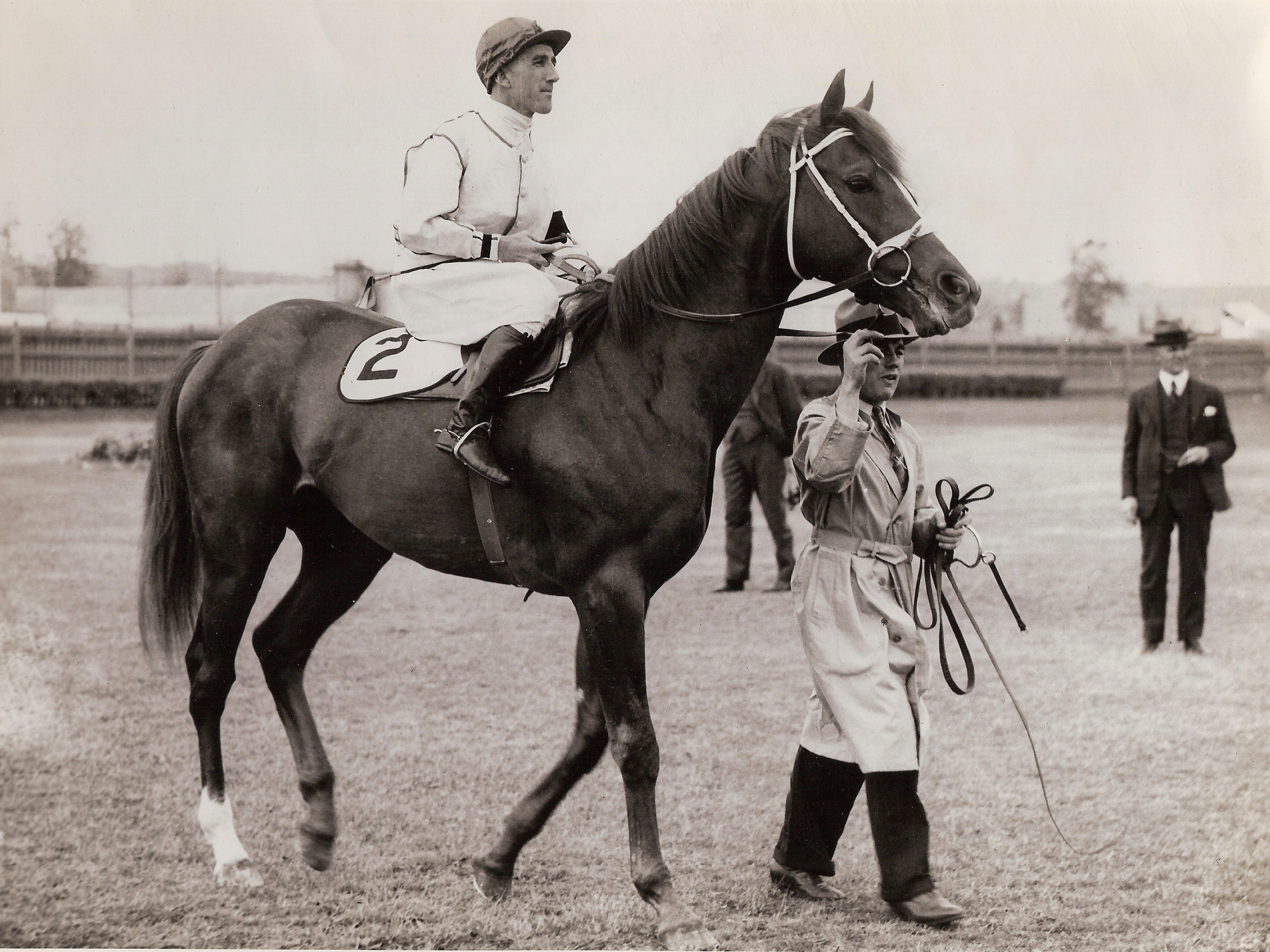
Ajax, 1938 winner

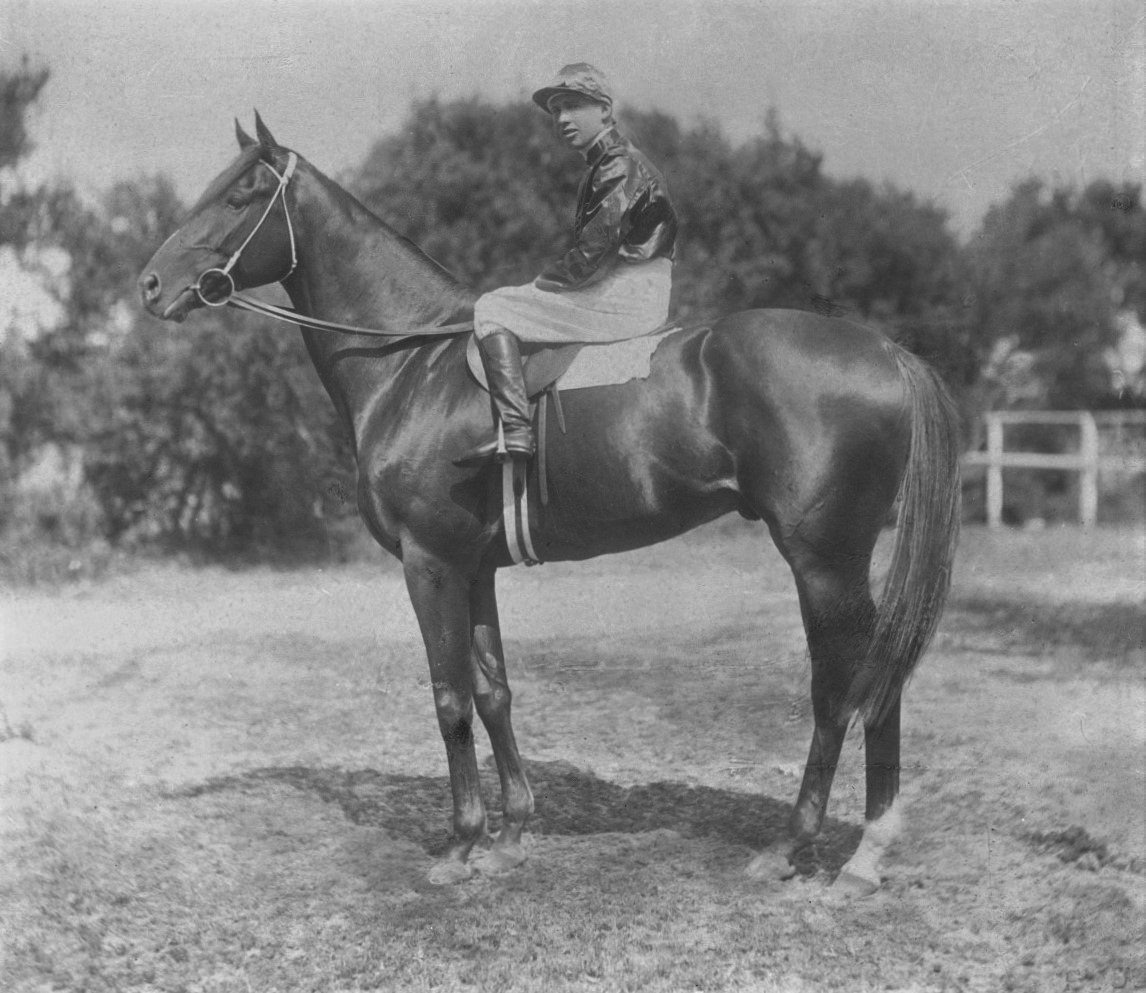
Eurythmic, 1920 winner

== Winners since 1999 ==
the following are past winners of the race:

Year	Winner	Jockey	Trainer	Time
2026	Pinhole	James McDonald	Chris Waller	2:41.92
2025	Whisky On The Hill	Damian Lane	Glen Thompson	2:49.17
2024	Smokin' Romans	Ben Melham	Ciaron Maher	2:47.20
2023	Muramasa	Daniel Moor	Trent Busuttin & Natalie Young	2:42.26
2022	Soulcombe	Craig Williams	Chris Waller	2:43.87
2021	Warning	Nash Rawiller	Anthony & Sam Freedman	2:44:69
2020	True Self	Hugh Bowman	Willie Mullins	2:44.99
2019	True Self	Ryan Moore	Willie Mullins	2:45.42
2018	Jaameh	Mark Zahra	David & Ben Hayes and Tom Dabernig	2:45.09
2017	Vengeur Masque	Patrick Moloney	Michael Moroney	2:42.99
2016	Francis Of Assisi	William Buick	Charlie Appleby	2:41.13
2015	Dandino	Ben Melham	Darren Weir	2:46.93
2014	Le Roi	Damien Oliver	Tony McEvoy	2:43.13
2013	Precedence	Craig Williams	Bart & James Cummings	2:46.45
2012	Puissance De Lune	Glen Boss	Darren Weir	2:44.23
2011	Ironstein	Brenton Avdulla	Gerald Ryan	2:44.81
2010	Moudre	Craig Williams	Ciaron Maher	2:45.22
2009	Sterling Prince	Hugh Bowman	Wayne Hillis	2:34.58
2008	Capecover	Craig Williams	Alexander Fieldes	2:38.89
2007	Zavite	Nash Rawiller	Anthony Cummings	2:38.57
2006	Gallant Guru	Steven Arnold	Lee Freedman	2:40.67
2005	Our Smoking Joe	Noel Callow	Lee Freedman	2:33.81
2004	Fantastic Love	Kerrin McEvoy	Saeed bin Suroor	2:44.80
2003	Zazzman	Kerrin McEvoy	Tony Vasil	2:37.52
2002	Makybe Diva	Luke Currie	David Hall	2:35.78
2001	Hatha Anna	Patrick Payne	Saeed bin Suroor	2:40.98
2000	Savrocca	Brett Prebble	Jeff Rogers	2:37.81
1999	Zerpour	Brett Prebble	David Hall	2:41.04

== Earlier winners ==
- 1998 - Might And Power
- 1997 - †Bright Spot / Vita Man
- 1996 - Valance
- 1995 - Pindi
- 1994 - Bullwinkle
- 1993 - Hear That Bell
- 1992 - Kawtuban
- 1991 - Frontier Ban
- 1990 - Savage Toss
- 1989 - Our Shannon Lad
- 1988 - Zamakima
- 1987 - Globetrotter
- 1986 - Colour Page
- 1985 - Chelaware
- 1984 - Irish Lord
- 1983 - Fountaincourt
- 1982 - My Sir Avon
- 1981 - Kip
- 1980 - Hyperno
- 1979 - Hyperno
- 1978 - Salamander
- 1977 - Tom's Mate
- 1976 - Perhaps
- 1975 - Four Leaf
- 1974 - Leilani
- 1973 - Director
- 1972 - Scotch And Dry
- 1971 - Classic Mission
- 1970 - Big Philou
- 1969 - Lochcourt
- 1968 - Rain Lover
- 1967 - General Command
- 1966 - Galilee
- 1965 - Craftsman
- 1964 - Piper's Son
- 1963 - Summer Fair
- 1962 - Even Stevens
- 1961 - Dhaulagiri
- 1960 - Nilarco
- 1959 - Webster
- 1958 - Sailor's Guide
- 1957 - Redcraze
- 1956 - Sailor's Guide
- 1955 - Rising Fast
- 1954 - Rising Fast
- 1953 - Hydrogen
- 1952 - Hydrogen
- 1951 - Bronton
- 1950 - Playboy
- 1949 - Dickens
- 1948 - Phoibos
- 1947 - Columnist
- 1946 - Leonard
- 1945 - Don Pedro
- 1944 - Race Not Held
- 1943 - Race Not Held
- 1942 - Race Not Held
- 1941 - High Caste
- 1940 - High Caste
- 1939 - High Caste
- 1938 - Ajax
- 1937 - Black Mac
- 1936 - Queen Of Song
- 1935 - Hall Mark
- 1934 - Nightly
- 1933 - Rogilla
- 1932 - Kuvera
- 1931 - Veilmond
- 1930 - Phar Lap
- 1929 - Amounis
- 1928 - Gothic
- 1927 - Silvius
- 1926 - Pantheon
- 1925 - Pilliewinkie
- 1924 - Lilypond
- 1923 - Rivoli
- 1922 - Violoncello
- 1921 - Tangalooma
- 1920 - Eurythmic
- 1919 - Artilleryman
- 1918 - Kennaquhair
- 1917 - Wallace Isinglass
- 1916 - Lavendo
- 1915 - Carlita
- 1914 - Mountain Knight
- 1913 - Radnor
- 1912 - Cider
- 1911 - Trafalgar
- 1910 - Alawa
- 1909 - Alawa
- 1908 - Alawa
- 1907 - Mountain King
- 1906 - Dividend
- 1905 - Tartan
- 1904 - Sweet Nell
- 1903 - Combat
- 1902 - Wakeful
- 1901 - Rock Gun
- 1900 - Maltster
- 1899 - Merriwee
- 1898 - The Grafter
- 1897 - Aurum
- 1896 - Bloodshot
- 1895 - †Auraria / Wallace
- 1894 - The Harvester
- 1893 - Patron
- 1892 - The Admiral
- 1891 - Steadfast
- 1890 - Megaphone
- 1889 - Abercorn
- 1888 - Mentor
- 1887 - The Australian Peer
- 1886 - Trident
- 1885 - Trenton
- 1884 - Commotion
- 1883 - Off Colour
- 1882 - Commotion
- 1881 - Wellington
- 1880 - Progress
- 1879 - Suwarrow
- 1878 - Warlock
- 1877 - Pluto
- 1876 - Calamia
- 1875 - Richmond
- 1874 - Melbourne
- 1873 - Don Juan
- 1872 - King Of The Ring
- 1871 - Warrior
- 1870 - Tim Whiffler
- 1869 - Charon
- 1868 - Glencoe
- 1867 - Tim Whiffler
- 1866 - Race Not Held
- 1865 - Volunteer
- 1864 - Race Not Held
- 1863 - Musidora
- 1862 - Race Not Held
- 1861 - Race Not Held
- 1860 - Race Not Held
- 1859 - The Moor
- 1858 - Green Linnet
- 1857 - Crockford
- 1856 - Tomboy
- 1855 - I Want It
- 1854 - Shadow

† Dead heat

== See also ==
- Champions Mile (VRC)
- Champions Sprint (VRC)
- Champions Stakes
- Matriarch Stakes (Australia)
- Thoroughbred racing in Australia
- Melbourne Spring Racing Carnival
- VRC Stakes day
- List of Australian Group races
- Group races
