= Tim Whiffler =

Australian Thoroughbred racehorse

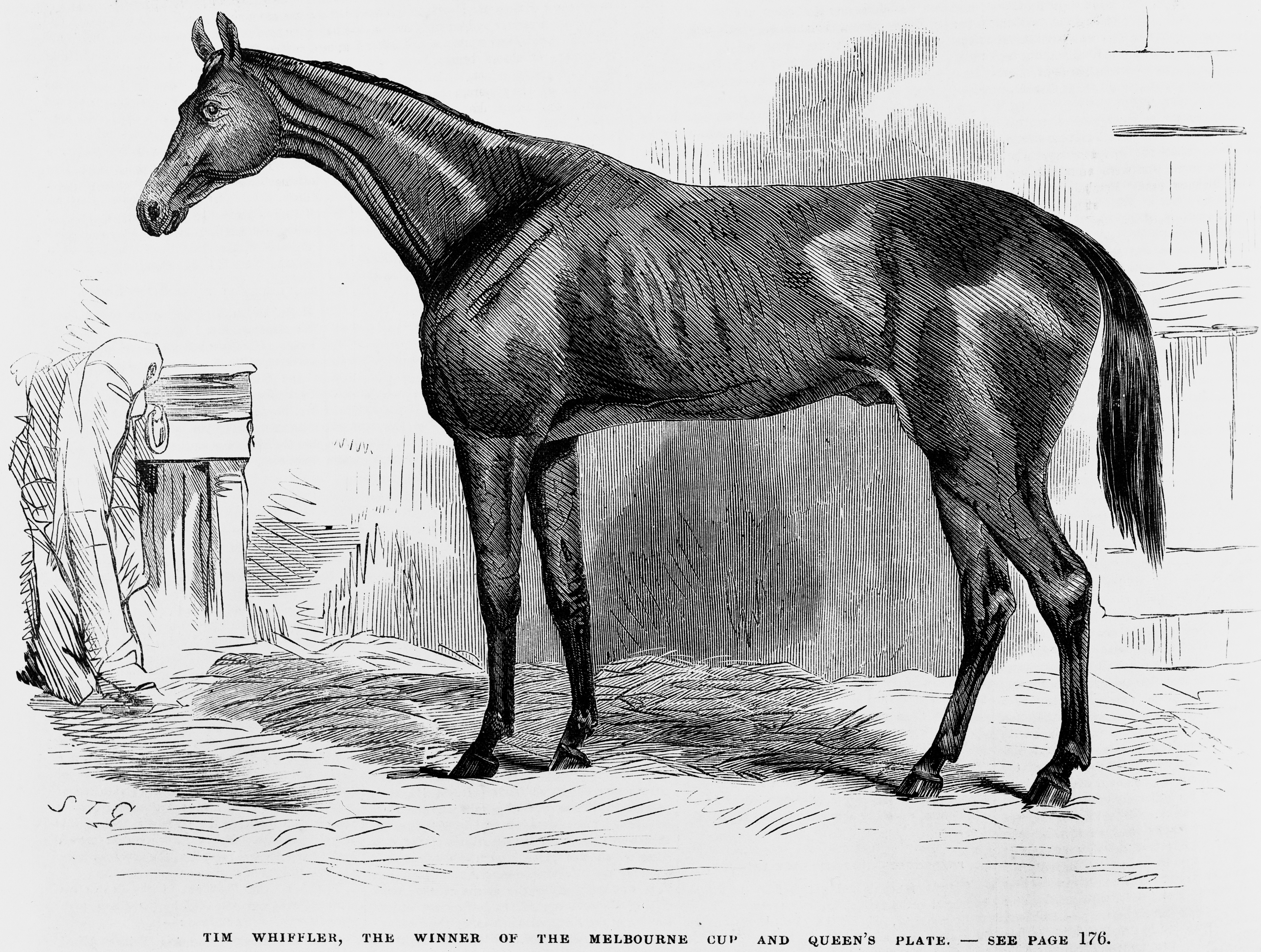
- Tim Whiffler, winner of the 1867 Melbourne Cup and Queen's Plate
- Sire: New Warrior (GB)
- Grandsire: Pyrrhus The First (GB)
- Dam: Cinderella (AUS)
- Damsire: St. John (GB)
- Sex: Stallion
- Foaled: 1862
- Country: Australia
- Colour: Bay
- Owner: Etienne de Mestre
- Trainer: Etienne de Mestre
- Record: 57-23:14:7

Major wins
- Australian Cup (1867); Melbourne Cup (1867); The Metropolitan (1867); VRC Queen’s Plate (1867, 1870); AJC Queen’s Plate (1868, 1870, 1871); All Aged Stakes (1870, 1871); Craven Plate (1870, 1871); VRC Melbourne Stakes (1870)
- Last updated on 21 April 2025

Tim Whiffler was an Australian bred Thoroughbred racehorse that won the 1867 Melbourne Cup ridden by jockey John Driscoll.

The 1867 Melbourne Cup included two horses with the name Tim Whiffler. The winning horse was known as Tim Whiffler Sydney. The other horse was called Tim Whiffler Melbourne.

The owners winning trophy was purchased by the National Museum of Australia.

== Pedigree ==
Pedigree of Tim Whiffler, 1862
Sire New Warrior 1851	Pyrrhus The First; 1843	Epirus	Langar
Sire New Warrior 1851	Pyrrhus The First; 1843	Epirus	Olympia
Sire New Warrior 1851	Pyrrhus The First; 1843	Fortress	Defence^
Sire New Warrior 1851	Pyrrhus The First; 1843	Fortress	Jewess
Sire New Warrior 1851	Colocynth; 1840	Physician	Brutandorf
Sire New Warrior 1851	Colocynth; 1840	Physician	Primette
Sire New Warrior 1851	Colocynth; 1840	Camelina	Whalebone*^
Sire New Warrior 1851	Colocynth; 1840	Camelina	Selim mare, 1812
Dam Cinderella 1845	St John; 1841	St Nicholas	Emilius
Dam Cinderella 1845	St John; 1841	St Nicholas	Sea Mew
Dam Cinderella 1845	St John; 1841	Thunderbolt mare	Thunderbolt
Dam Cinderella 1845	St John; 1841	Thunderbolt mare	Precipitate mare
Dam Cinderella 1845	Old Cinderella; 1830	Rous Emigrant	Pioneer
Dam Cinderella 1845	Old Cinderella; 1830	Rous Emigrant	Ringtail
Dam Cinderella 1845	Old Cinderella; 1830	Spaewife	Soothsayer
Dam Cinderella 1845	Old Cinderella; 1830	Spaewife	Selim mare, 1814

*^ Tim Whiffler is inbred 5S x 4S to the stallion Whalebone, meaning that he appears fifth generation (via Defence)^ and fourth generation on the sire side of his pedigree.

== See also ==
- Tim Whiffler (British horse)
