= Desert Gold =

Desert Gold may refer to:

- Geraea canescens, a wildflower also known as Desert Sunflower
- Desert Gold (horse), a New Zealand Thoroughbred racehorse
  - Desert Gold (1919 Australian film), an Australian film about the racehorse and directed by Beaumont Smith
- Desert Gold (novel), a novel set in the Old West by Zane Grey
  - Desert Gold (1919 American film), a 1919 American film based on the novel and directed by T. Hayes Hunter
  - Desert Gold (1926 film), a 1926 American film based on the novel and directed by George B. Seitz
  - Desert Gold (1936 film), a 1936 American film based on the novel and directed by James P. Hogan
