= Taranaki (disambiguation) =

Taranaki is a region of New Zealand administered by the Taranaki Regional Council.

Taranaki may also refer to:

== Place names ==
- Mount Taranaki (also known as Mount Egmont), a mountain
- Taranaki Province, a province from 1853 to 1876

== Other uses ==
- Port Taranaki, port at New Plymouth, New Zealand
- Taranaki (iwi), a Māori tribe
- Taranaki was a 1957 British nuclear test in Australia

=== Politics ===
- Taranaki-King Country, a parliamentary electorate
- Taranaki (New Zealand electorate), a former parliamentary electorate

=== Sport ===
- Taranaki Mountainairs, a basketball team
- Taranaki Open, a golf tournament
- Taranaki Rockets, a former rugby league club
- Taranaki Rugby Football Union, a rugby governance body
- Taranaki Rugby League, a rugby league governance body
- Taranaki Stakes, a former horse race
- Taranaki Wildcats, a former rugby league team
- Team Taranaki, a football club

=== Military ===
- HMNZS Taranaki (F148), a former frigate of the Royal New Zealand Navy
