= Great Northern St. Leger =

New Zealand horse race

The Great Northern St. Leger was a horse race for three-year-old racehorses held over 2700 metres in Auckland, New Zealand.

It was first raced in 1916, whereas the New Zealand St. Leger started at Wellington in 1899.

Winners include Desert Gold (1916) and Kindergarten (1941).

== See also ==
- Thoroughbred racing in New Zealand
