= Japan Racing Association Plate =

- Class: Group 3
- Location: Randwick Racecourse; Sydney, Australia
- Inaugurated: 1997
- Race type: Thoroughbred – Flat racing
- Sponsor: Myplates (2025 & 2026)

Race information
- Distance: 2,000 metres
- Surface: Turf
- Track: Right-handed
- Qualification: Three years old and older
- Weight: Quality Handicap
- Purse: $250,000 (2026)

The Japan Racing Association Plate is an Australian Turf Club Group 3 Thoroughbred quality handicap horse race for horses three years old and older, held over a distance of 2000 metres at Randwick Racecourse, Sydney, Australia in April.

== History ==
=== Name ===
- 1997–2007 - Japan Racing Association Plate
- 2008 - Japan Trophy
- 2009 onwards - Japan Racing Association Plate

=== Grade ===
- 1997–2013 - Listed race
- 2014 onwards - Group 3

== Winners ==
The following are past winners of the race.

- 2026 - Asterix
- 2025 - Bois D'Argent
- 2024 - Huetor
- 2023 - Diamil
- 2022 - Polly Grey
- 2021 - Paths Of Glory
- 2020 - Life Less Ordinary
- 2019 - Grey Lion
- 2018 - Tally
- 2017 - Top Of My List
- 2016 - Guardini
- 2015 - Gypsy Diamond
- 2014 - Spillway
- 2013 - Kelinni
- 2012 - Western Symbol
- 2011 - Hawk Island
- 2010 - Herculian Prince
- 2009 - Prima Nova
- 2008 - Viewed
- 2007 - Safwa
- 2006 - Above Deck
- 2005 - Jeremiad
- 2004 - On A High
- 2003 - Pentastic
- 2002 - Restless
- 2001 - Bowood Forest
- 2000 - Vitrinite
- 1999 - Tie The Knot
- 1998 - Back In The Saddle
- 1997 - Sharscay

== See also ==
- All Aged Stakes
- Champagne Stakes (ATC)
- Frank Packer Plate
- Hall Mark Stakes
- James H B Carr Stakes
- List of Australian Group races
- Group races
