= Frank Packer Plate =

- Class: Group 3
- Location: Randwick Racecourse; Sydney, New South Wales, Australia
- Inaugurated: 1980
- Race type: Thoroughbred – Flat racing
- Sponsor: Toyota (2023, 2025-26)

Race information
- Distance: 2,000 metres
- Surface: Turf
- Track: Right-handed
- Qualification: Three year old
- Weight: Set weights colts and geldings – 56 1/2 kg fillies – 54 1/2 kg
- Purse: $250,000 (2026)

The Frank Packer Plate is an Australian Turf Club Group 3 Thoroughbred horse race for three-year-olds at set weights run over a distance of 2000 metres at Randwick Racecourse, Sydney, Australia during the Autumn Carnival.

== History ==
Those three year old gallopers who were not able to participate in the Australian Derby or in the Australian Oaks held over a distance of 2400 metres often take part in this middle distance event.

During recent times the race has been held on the last day of the ATC Autumn Carnival.

=== Name ===
The race is named in honour of Sir Douglas Frank Hewson Packer, who was a media proprietor and former committeeman of the Australian Jockey Club for 12 years.

=== Grade ===
- 1980–1990 - Group 2
- 1991 onwards - Group 3

== Winners ==
The following are past winners of the race.

- 2026 - Matias
- 2025 - Shangri La Spring
- 2024 - Kintyre
- 2023 - Osipenko
- 2022 - Verona
- 2021 - Senor Toba
- 2020 - Kinane
- 2019 - The Chosen One
- 2018 - Higher Ground
- 2017 - Mongolian Wolf
- 2016 - He's Our Rokkii
- 2015 - Hi World
- 2014 - Arabian Gold
- 2013 - Usainity
- 2012 - Fat Al
- 2011 - Shootoff
- 2010 - Dariana
- 2009 - Yallingup
- 2008 - Rockwood
- 2007 - Carnegie House
- 2006 - Dream Machine
- 2005 - Afraah
- 2004 - Red Terror
- 2003 - Clangalang
- 2002 - Arlington Road
- 2001 - Spurred On
- 2000 - Freemason
- 1999 - Franklin River
- 1998 - Dodge
- 1997 - Might and Power
- 1996 - Mr Piper
- 1995 - Juggler
- 1994 - Espinosa
- 1993 - Play Or Pay
- 1992 - In The Event
- 1991 - Bold Rancher
- 1990 - Stargazer
- 1989 - Royal Pardon
- 1988 - Serestrina
- 1987 - Never Quit
- 1986 - Swift Cheval
- 1985 - Spritely Native
- 1984 - Pleasant Star
- 1983 - Chiamara
- 1982 - Dalmacia
- 1981 - Shaybisc
- 1980 - Lauriat

== See also ==
- All Aged Stakes
- Champagne Stakes (ATC)
- Hall Mark Stakes
- James H B Carr Stakes
- Japan Racing Association Plate
- List of Australian Group races
- Group races
