= The Hawk (horse) =

New Zealand-bred Thoroughbred racehorse

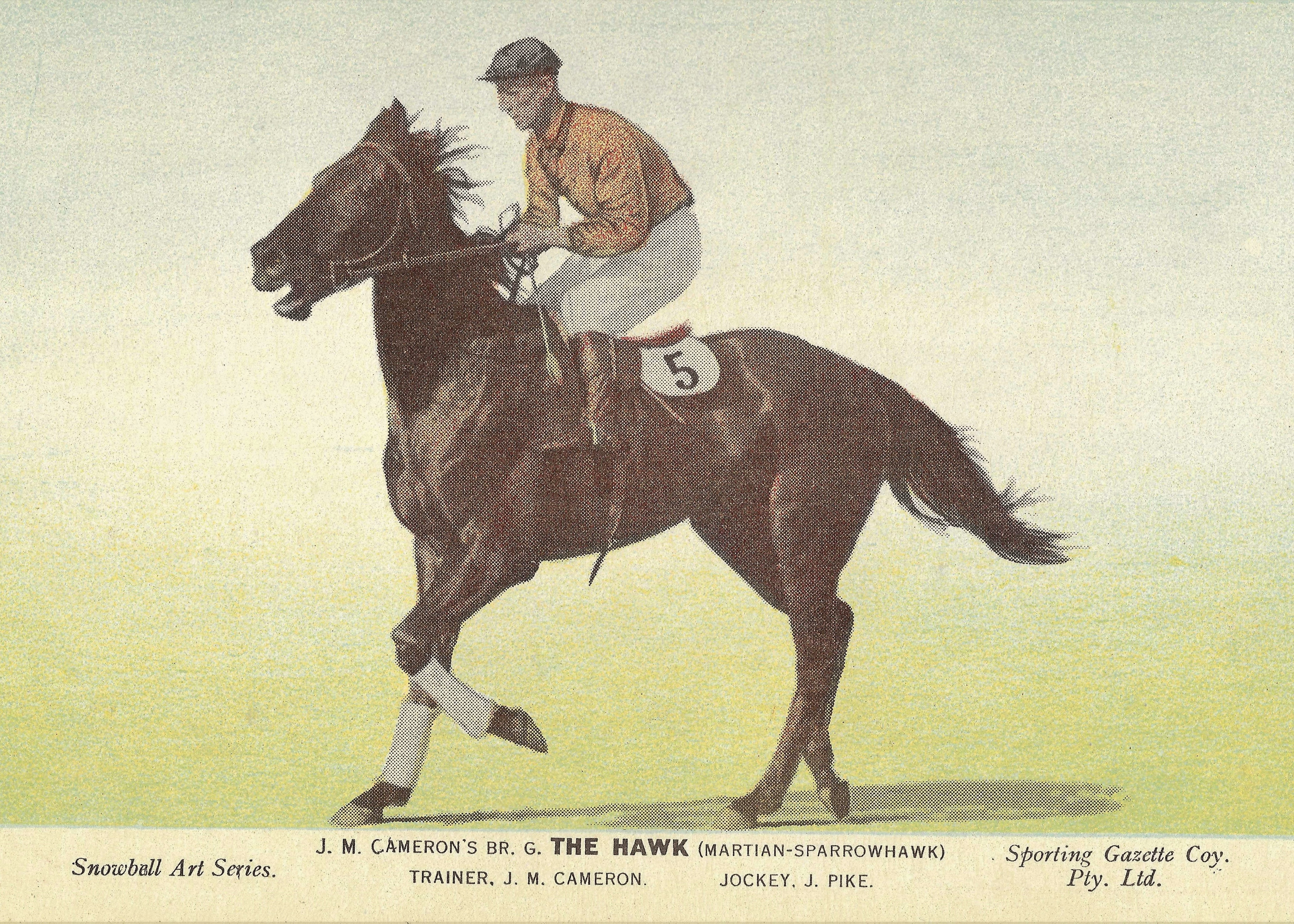
- The Hawk with Jim Pike up
- Sire: Martian (NZ)
- Grandsire: Martagon (GB)
- Dam: Sparrow Hawk (GB)
- Damsire: Land League
- Sex: Gelding
- Foaled: 1918
- Country: New Zealand
- Colour: Brown
- Owner: J.M. Cameron
- Trainer: J.M. Cameron
- Record: 136: 31½-18-20
- Earnings: $48,520 (approx)

Major wins
- Hawke's Bay Guineas (1921); Islington Stakes (1923); Hill Stakes (1923, 1925); St George Stakes (1924, 1925); Futurity Stakes (1923); Essendon Stakes (1923, 1924); C M Lloyd Stakes (1923, 1924); Caulfield Stakes (1924); AJC Challenge Stakes (1925); All Aged Stakes (1925); Taranaki Stakes (1927, 1928)
- Last updated on 30 May 2009

The Hawk (foaled 1918) was an exceptional New Zealand bred Thoroughbred racehorse. He had 136 race starts, winning top quality races in both New Zealand and Australia, and set Australasian records for six and eight furlongs. In an exceptional career he won over all distances from 4 furlongs to 12 furlongs and his last race was as a rising 13-year-old.

== Breeding ==
He was by the good racehorse and great sire, Martian out of the unraced, Sparrow Hawk (GB) by Land League. Sparrow Hawk was the dam of only two foals, of which only The Hawk was named and raced. The Hawk was purchased as a yearling for 350 guineas by W.J. Douglas and, on his death in 1922, was sold to New Zealand trainer J.M. Cameron for 700 guineas.

== Racing record ==
He won six of his ten races as a two-year-old and broke the Australasian record for six furlongs as a three-year-old in winning the Waterloo Stakes.

As a five-year-old The Hawk had his first season racing in Australia where his wins included the Hill Stakes, St George Stakes, Futurity Stakes, Essendon Stakes and C M Lloyd Stakes. At aged six he continued his Australian campaign winning the Caulfield Stakes, Challenge Stakes, St George Stakes, Essendon Stakes, Rawson Stakes and All Aged Stakes.

In the autumn of 1925 he returned to New Zealand to meet the great old champion Gloaming (then rising ten years old) in a match race in the Hawke's Bay J.D. Ormond Memorial Gold Cup at Hastings. The event attracted many thousands of spectators to the Hastings Racecourse where, in the run to the line, Gloaming lengthened his stride to pass The Hawk and win by a length in record time.

The Hawk continued racing in New Zealand until the age of 13. His wins during his later years included the 1927 WRC Metropolitan Handicap, the 1927 and 1928 Taranaki Stakes, and the 1930 Taranaki Cup when aged 11. At age 12 he won his thirty-first, and last race in the Dannevirke Cup.
