= Hall Mark (horse) =

Australian Thoroughbred racehorse

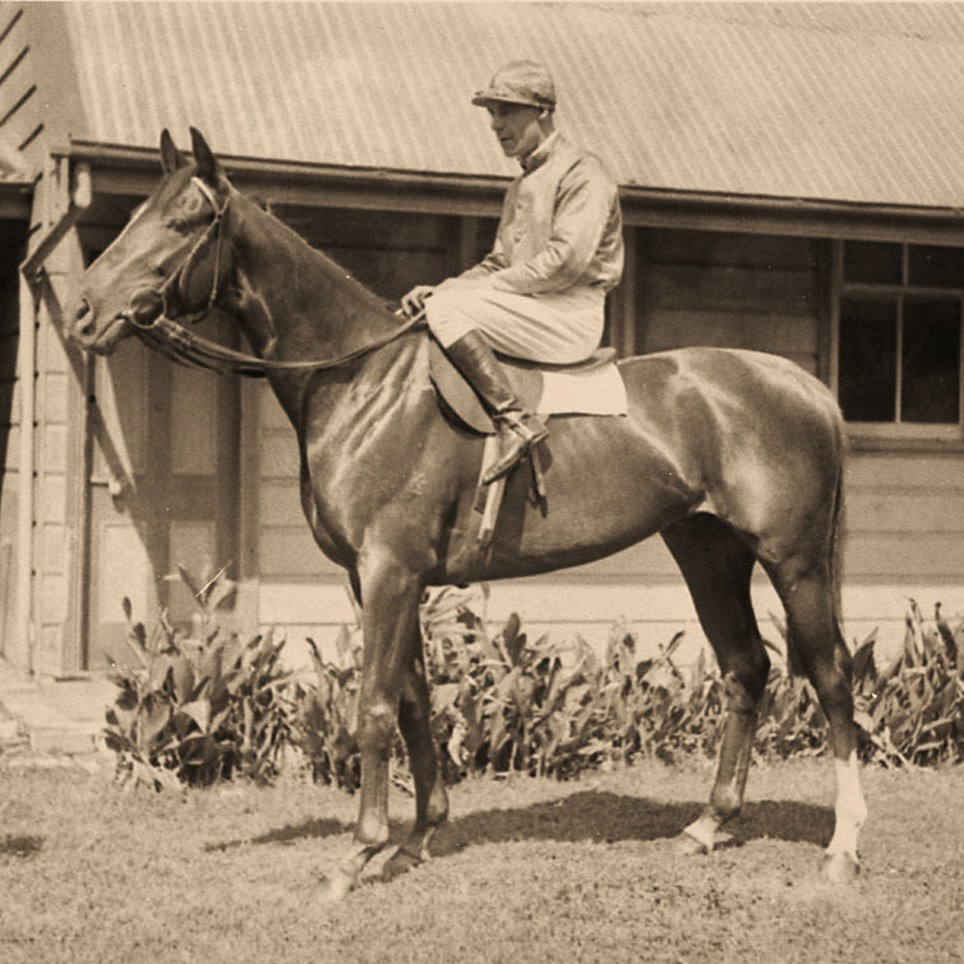
- Hall Mark and Darby Munro
- Sire: Heroic (AUS)
- Grandsire: Valais (GB)
- Dam: Herowinkie (AUS)
- Damsire: Cyklon (IRE)
- Sex: Stallion
- Foaled: 1930
- Died: 1953
- Country: Australia
- Colour: Chestnut
- Breeder: C.B. Kellow
- Owner: C.B.Kellow
- Trainer: Jack Holt
- Record: 52: 18,16, 9
- Earnings: £28,619

Major wins
- AJC Sires Produce Stakes (1933); AJC Champagne Stakes (1933); AJC Derby (1933); VRC Derby (1933); Melbourne Cup (1933); Underwood Stakes (1933, 1934); VRC October Stakes (1934); Caulfield Stakes (1934); VRC St Leger (1934); VRC Kings Plate (1934, 1935); WRC Williamstown Stakes (1935); Doncaster Handicap (1935); Memsie Stakes (1935); C.B.Fisher Plate (1935)

Honours
- Australian Racing Hall of Fame (2019); Hall Mark Stakes
- Last updated on 14 May 2019

Hall Mark (1930−1953) was a versatile chestnut Thoroughbred stallion. He performed in Australia, trained by Australian Racing Hall of Fame trainer Jack Holt. He raced from a two-year-old to a five-year-old, recording 18 wins from 6 furlongs to 2 miles. Ridden mostly by champion jockeys Bill Duncan and Frank Dempsey. Hall Mark was inducted into the Australian Racing Hall of Fame in 2019.

== Breeding ==
Hall Mark was bred by his owner Charles Kellow at Tarwyn Park stud Rylstone, New South Wales by Heroic (AUS) a leading sire and classic winner of major races in Australia was purchased for 16,000 guineas. Dam Herowinkie (AUS) a failure on the racetrack was purchased for 800 guineas by Charles Kellow.

Breeder, Charles Brown Kellow born in Sutton Grange, Victoria in 1871 originally exploited the bicycle boom of the 1890s as a racing cyclist and salesman and in 1910 began importing a range of expensive motor cars under Kellow Motor Co. In his forties then diversified into sheep grazing and horse racing ownership notables being Heroic, Hall Mark and Nuffield 1938 AJC Derby & VRC Derby winner.

== Racing career ==
Hall Mark raced between 1932 and 1935 over four seasons and is best known for winning the 1933 Melbourne Cup a dual classic winner of the 1933 AJC Derby & VRC Derby in the same year with success in signature W.F.A and Handicap races in Sydney and Melbourne, wins in the 1934 VATC Caulfield Stakes defeating Chatham and the 1935 VRC Kings Plate defeating Rogilla confirming his ability in a vintage era. In recognition of past success each year the Hall Mark Stakes is run at Randwick Racecourse.

Standing at stud his best horse was Hall Stand 1942 AJC Sires Produce Stakes, 1942 Hobartville Stakes and 1942 Rosehill Guineas.

On his owner Kellow's death in 1944, Hall Mark was sold to Burnside Stud in Ingham, Queensland. For the next nine years, he was predominantly used to sire working horses. In this capacity he had an enduring influence as a progenitor of the emerging specialist breed, the Australian Stock Horse. Hall Mark died in 1953 aged 23.

Hall Mark's racing colours: Gold, green sleeves and cap.

Hall Mark's racing record: 52 starts for 18 wins, 16 seconds, 9 thirds and 9 unplaced runs.

== Image gallery ==
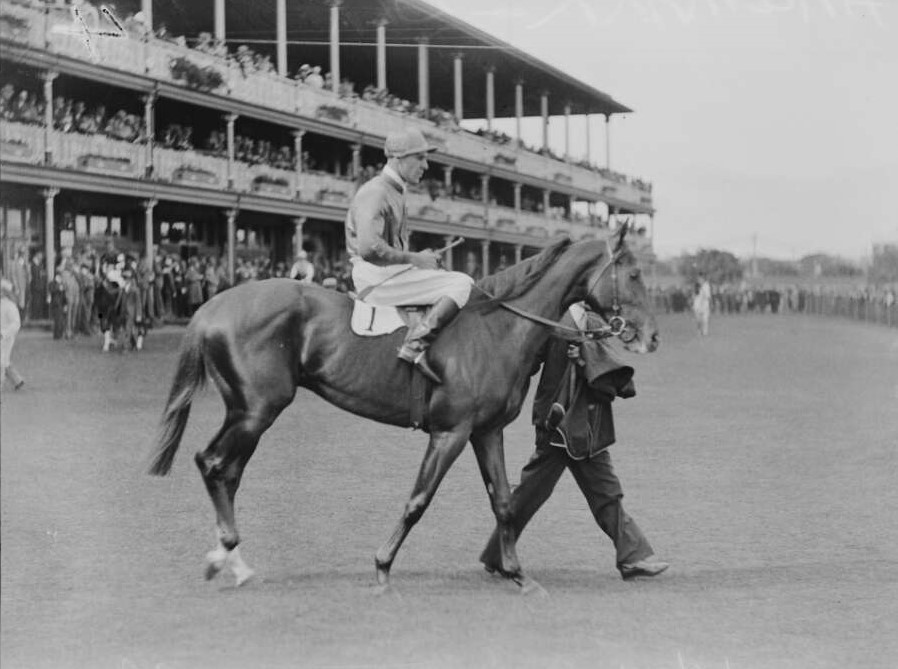
Hall Mark and Darby Munro Randwick

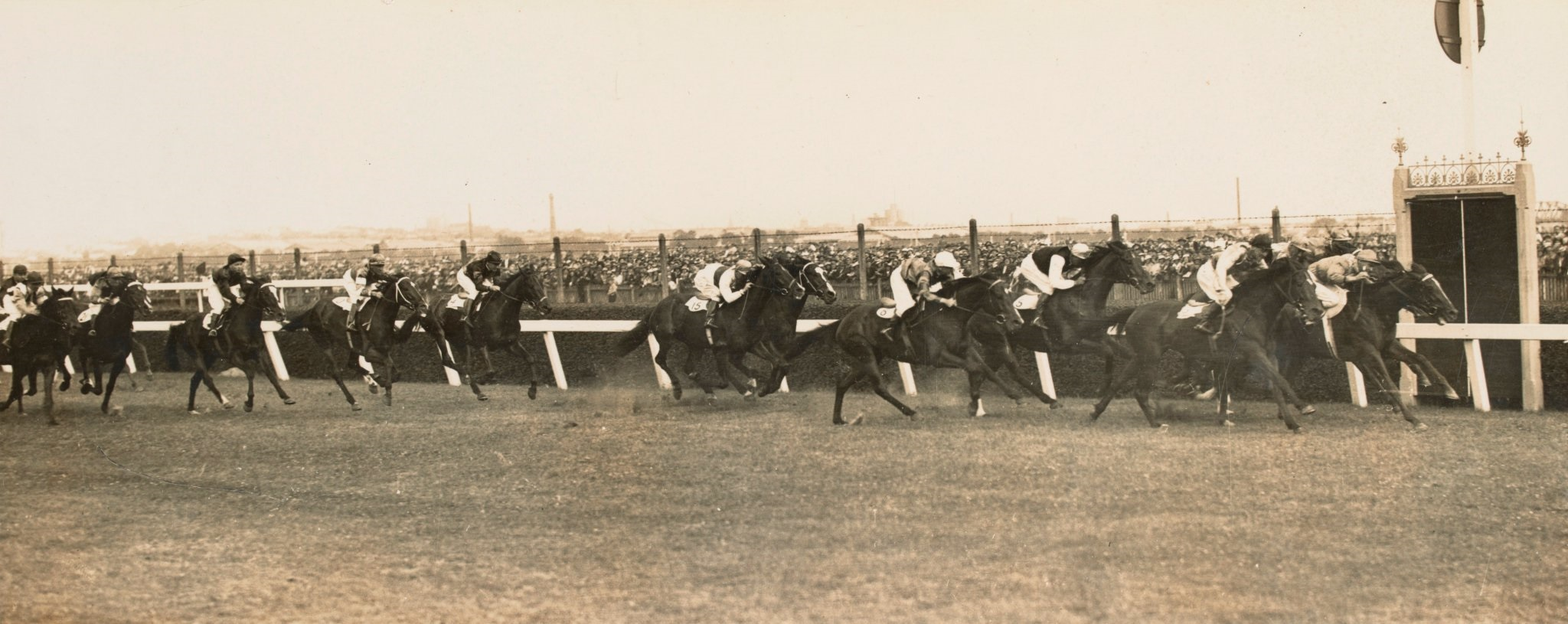
Hall Mark, 1933 Melbourne Cup finish

=== 1933 racebook ===
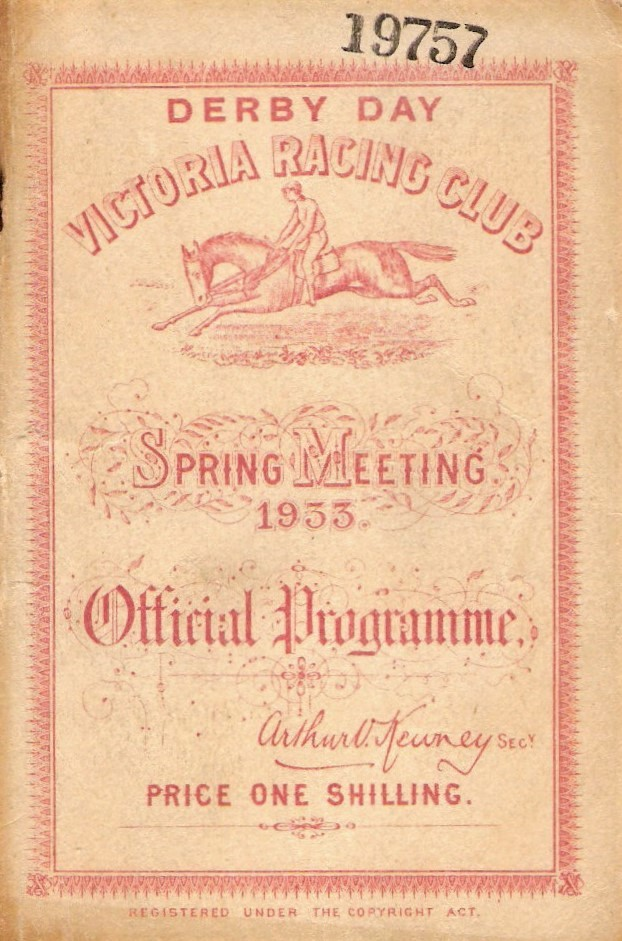
1933 VRC Derby racebook front cover

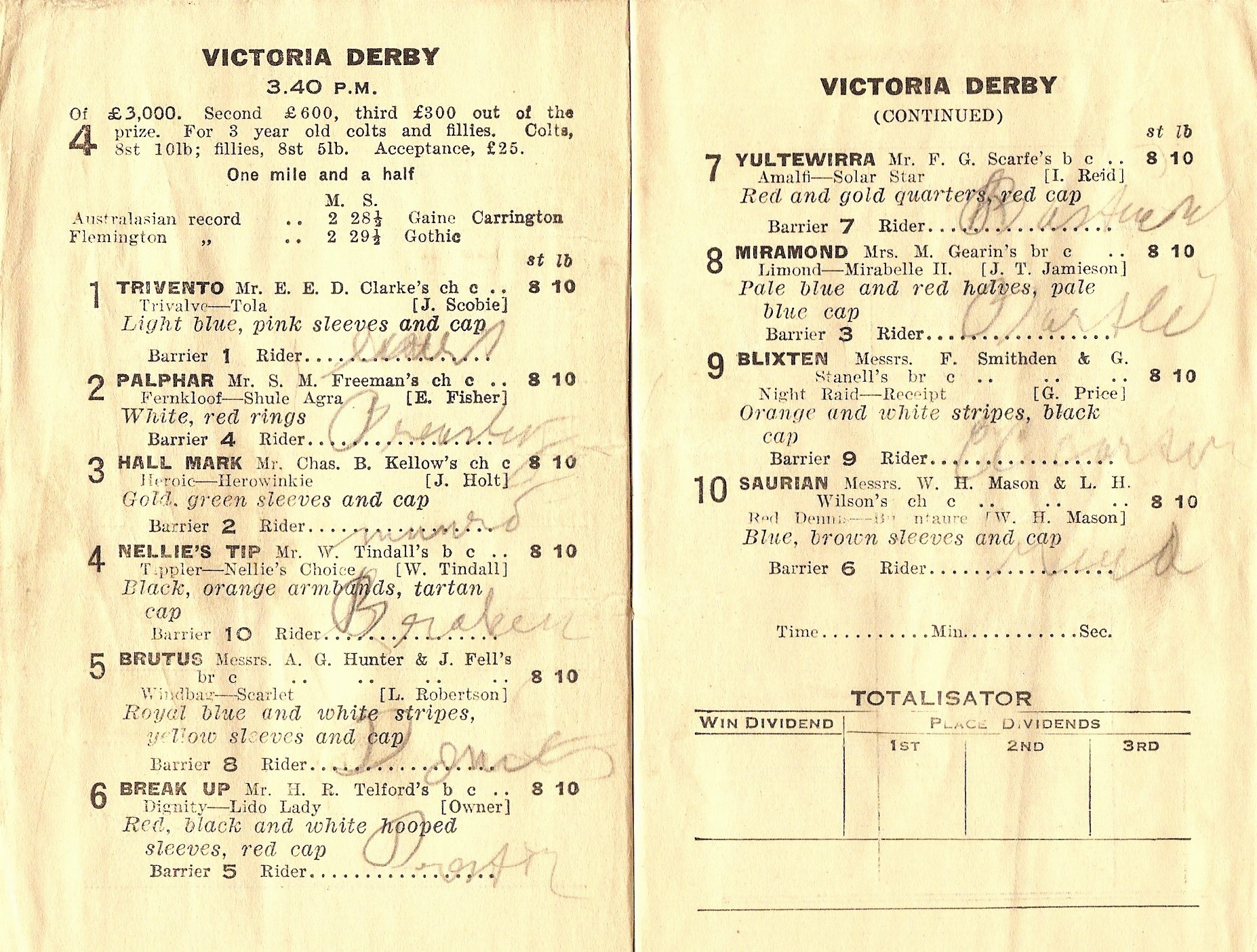
1933 VRC Derby starters and jockeys showing the winner, Hall Mark

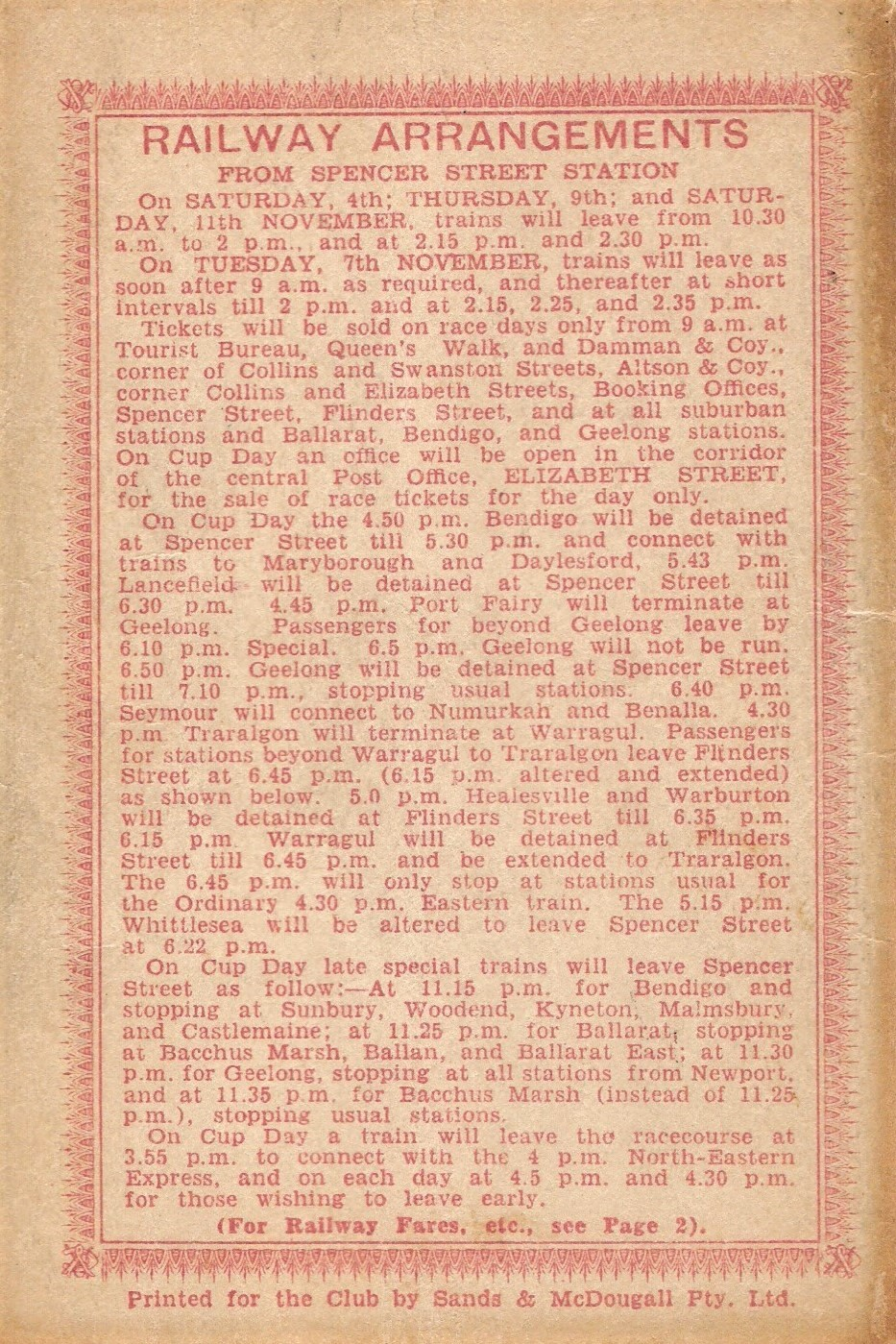
Back cover showing train timetables
