= Fireworks (horse) =

- Sire: Kelpie
- Grandsire: Weatherbit
- Dam: Gaslight
- Damsire: Sir Hercules
- Sex: Stallion
- Foaled: 1864
- Country: Australia
- Colour: Bay
- Record: 23, 14-3-2

Fireworks (1864–1878) was an Australian racehorse and sire. He is known as the only horse to have won the Victoria Derby twice.

== Background ==
Fireworks was owned by Patrick Keigan, who sold him to Major Graham Mylne as a yearling. Mylne subsequently leased him to John Tait.

== Racing career ==
As a three-year old, Fireworks started 16 races, having won 12. He won 14 of 23 races during his career.

Major wins:

- Champagne Stakes (1867)
- Australian Derby (1867)
- Victoria Derby (1867)
- Victoria Derby (1868)^
- VRC St Leger (1868)
- All Aged Stakes (1868)

^ - only horse to have won the Victoria Derby twice

== Stud career ==
Notable offspring:

- Goldsbrough (1870) - 1875 Melbourne Cup placegetter
- Lapidist (1870) - won 1873 Victoria Derby
- Robin Hood (1872) - won 1875 Victoria Derby

== Sire line tree ==
- Fireworks
  - Dante
  - Goldsbrough
    - Morpeth
    - Sou'Wester
    - Impulse
    - Petronel
    - The Broker
    - Arsenal
      - Murmur
    - Algerian
    - Burrilda
    - Cardigan
    - Melos
    - Trade Wind
    - Keith
    - Merriment
    - Merriwa
    - Brockleigh
    - Aeolus
    - Kilmore
  - Lapidist
    - Occident
  - Mute
    - Pasha
  - Robin Hood
  - The Professor
  - Firstwater

== Pedigree ==
Pedigree of Fireworks (AUS), bay horse, 1864
Sire Kelpie (GB) 1855	Weatherbit; 1842	Sheet Anchor	Lottery
Sire Kelpie (GB) 1855	Weatherbit; 1842	Sheet Anchor	Morgiana
Sire Kelpie (GB) 1855	Weatherbit; 1842	Miss Letty	Priam
Sire Kelpie (GB) 1855	Weatherbit; 1842	Miss Letty	Orville mare
Sire Kelpie (GB) 1855	Child Of The Mist; 1848	St Francis	St Patrick
Sire Kelpie (GB) 1855	Child Of The Mist; 1848	St Francis	Surprise
Sire Kelpie (GB) 1855	Child Of The Mist; 1848	Taurina	Taurus
Sire Kelpie (GB) 1855	Child Of The Mist; 1848	Taurina	Esmeralda
Dam Gaslight (GB) 1850	Sir Hercules; 1826	Whalebone	Waxy
Dam Gaslight (GB) 1850	Sir Hercules; 1826	Whalebone	Penelope
Dam Gaslight (GB) 1850	Sir Hercules; 1826	Peri	Wanderer
Dam Gaslight (GB) 1850	Sir Hercules; 1826	Peri	Thalestris
Dam Gaslight (GB) 1850	Factory Girl; 1837	Lamplighter	Merlin
Dam Gaslight (GB) 1850	Factory Girl; 1837	Lamplighter	Spotless
Dam Gaslight (GB) 1850	Factory Girl; 1837	Spinning Jenny	Juniper
Dam Gaslight (GB) 1850	Factory Girl; 1837	Spinning Jenny	Oscar mare
