= Thomas Lowry (racehorse breeder) =

New Zealand farmer, cricketer and racehorse breeder

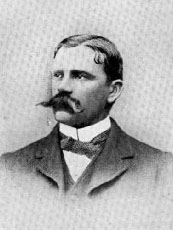
- Born: Thomas Henry Lowry; 25 July 1865; Hastings, New Zealand
- Died: 23 September 1944 (aged 79); Okawa, Hastings, New Zealand
- Education: Christ's College, Christchurch; Jesus College, Cambridge
- Occupations: Farmer, cricketer, racehorse breeder
- Spouse: Marsie Watt (m. 1897)
- Relatives: Tom Lowry (son); Percy Chapman (son-in-law); Reg Bettington (son-in-law)

Thomas Henry Lowry (25 July 1865 – 23 September 1944) was a New Zealand farmer, cricketer and racehorse breeder.

Educated at Christ's College, Christchurch and at Jesus College, Cambridge, Lowry inherited the family property, Okawa, of 20,000 acres, in the Hawke's Bay region of the North Island when his father died in 1880. He married Helen ("Marsie") Watt, daughter of the New Zealand shipping magnate James Watt, in 1897. One of Marsie's sisters married Robert Baden-Powell's brother Francis; another married the British explorer Ewart Grogan.

Lowry played one first-class cricket match, captaining Hawke's Bay to victory over Taranaki in 1892. He constructed a cricket ground, "The Grove", on his property, which is still in use. He helped the Hawke's Bay Cricket Association bring out leading English professionals, including Albert Trott and Jack Board, to coach local players.

Lowry developed Okawa, which had been largely a sheep and cattle farm, into one of New Zealand's leading racehorse studs. He owned several successful horses, such as Gondolier, Madrigal, Downfall (New Zealand Cup, 1908), Bobrikoff (24 wins from 52 starts, including the 1912 Auckland Cup) and Balboa (Auckland Cup, 1915). His most prominent breeding success was the mare Desert Gold, who won her first 19 races, finished with 36 wins from 59 starts, and held the New Zealand record for the amount of money won for 30 years. In 1916, 1917 and 1918 Lowry was the leading owner in New Zealand in terms of stakes won.

Lowry and Marsie had five children between 1898 and 1904: Tom, who captained the Cambridge University cricket team and the New Zealand Test team and inherited Okawa; Jim (who won a tennis Blue at Cambridge University before returning to run part of Okawa); Ralph (Rugby union Blue at Cambridge, another Lowry farmer, and the author of the book Taihape: Be Happy, Die Happy); Gertrude (known as "Beet") (who married Tom's Cambridge University friend Percy Chapman, who captained the English Test cricket team); and Marion (who married Reg Bettington, Oxford University cricket captain and later medical specialist).

Marsie was awarded the OBE in 1918 in recognition of her charitable work for soldiers during World War I. Early in World War II the Lowrys donated 10,000 pounds to the New Zealand Patriotic Fund for the construction of the "Lowry Hut" at Maadi Camp in Cairo. The "hut" was actually an extensive building incorporating a range of facilities for allied soldiers. Their daughter Beet worked there throughout the war. Lady Freyberg said of her work: "her value as a morale-raiser to the NZEF [was] beyond price".

In 2025 Lowry was inducted into the New Zealand Racing Hall of Fame.
