= All Aged Stakes =

Australian horse race

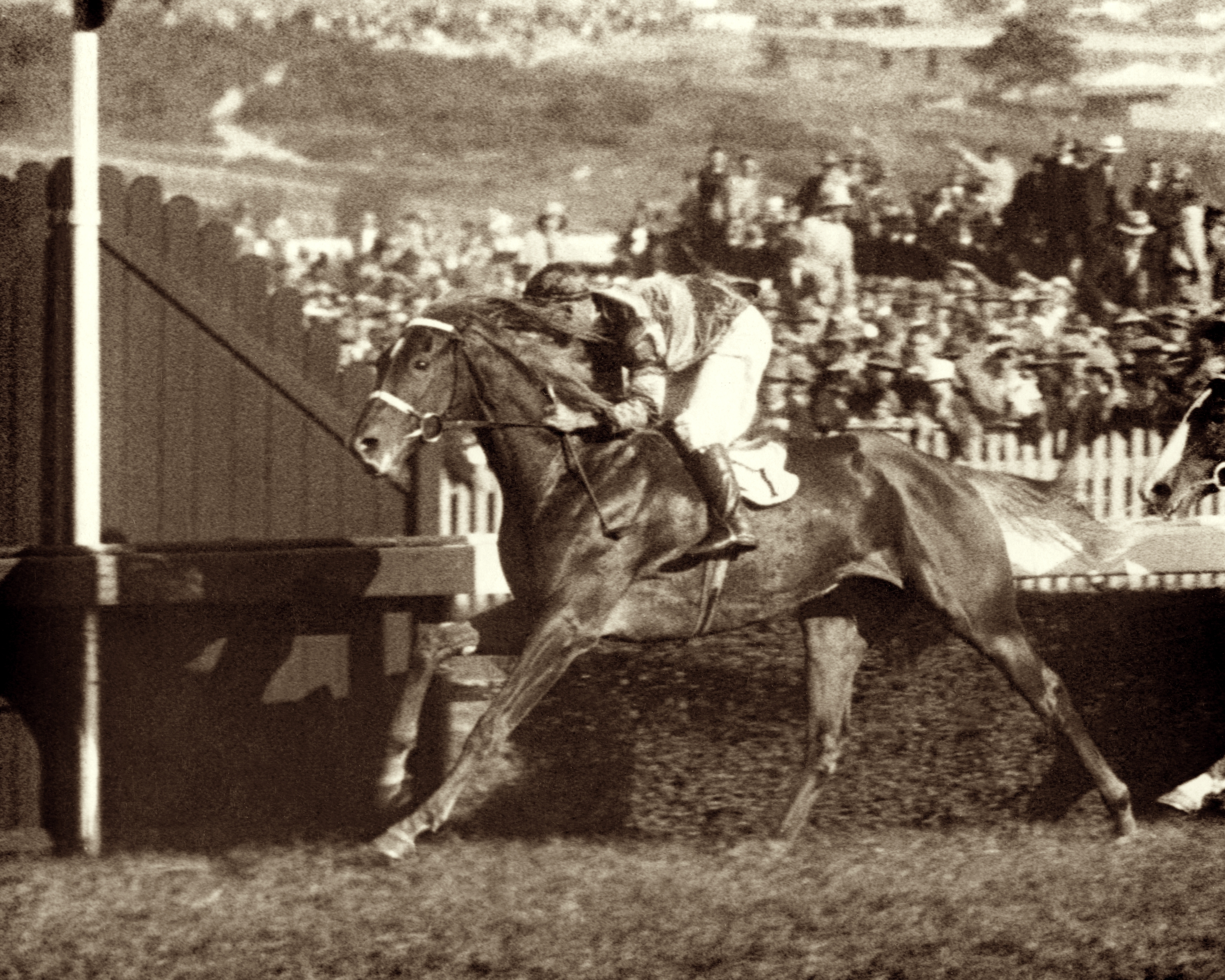
- Peter Pan, 1935 winner
- Class: Group 1
- Location: Randwick Racecourse; Sydney, Australia
- Inaugurated: 1865
- Race type: Thoroughbred - flat
- Sponsor: Schweppes (2014-26)

Race information
- Distance: 1,400 metres
- Surface: Turf
- Track: Right-handed
- Weight: Weight for Age
- Purse: A$1,500,000 (2026)

The All Aged Stakes is an Australian Turf Club Group 1 Thoroughbred Weight for Age horse race, run over a distance of 1,400 metres at Randwick Racecourse, Sydney, Australia in April or May during the ATC Autumn Carnival.

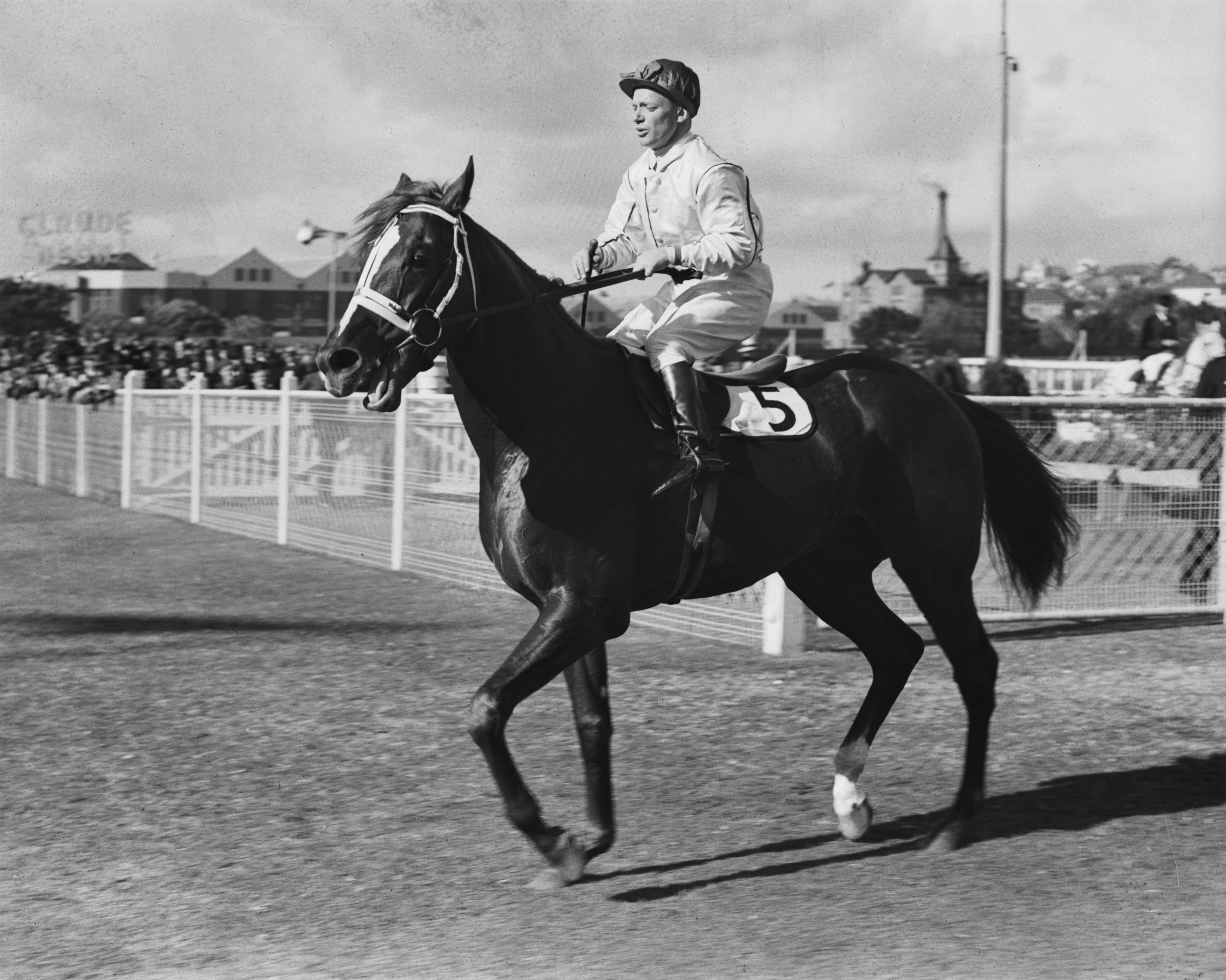
Ajax, 1938, 1939, 1940 winner

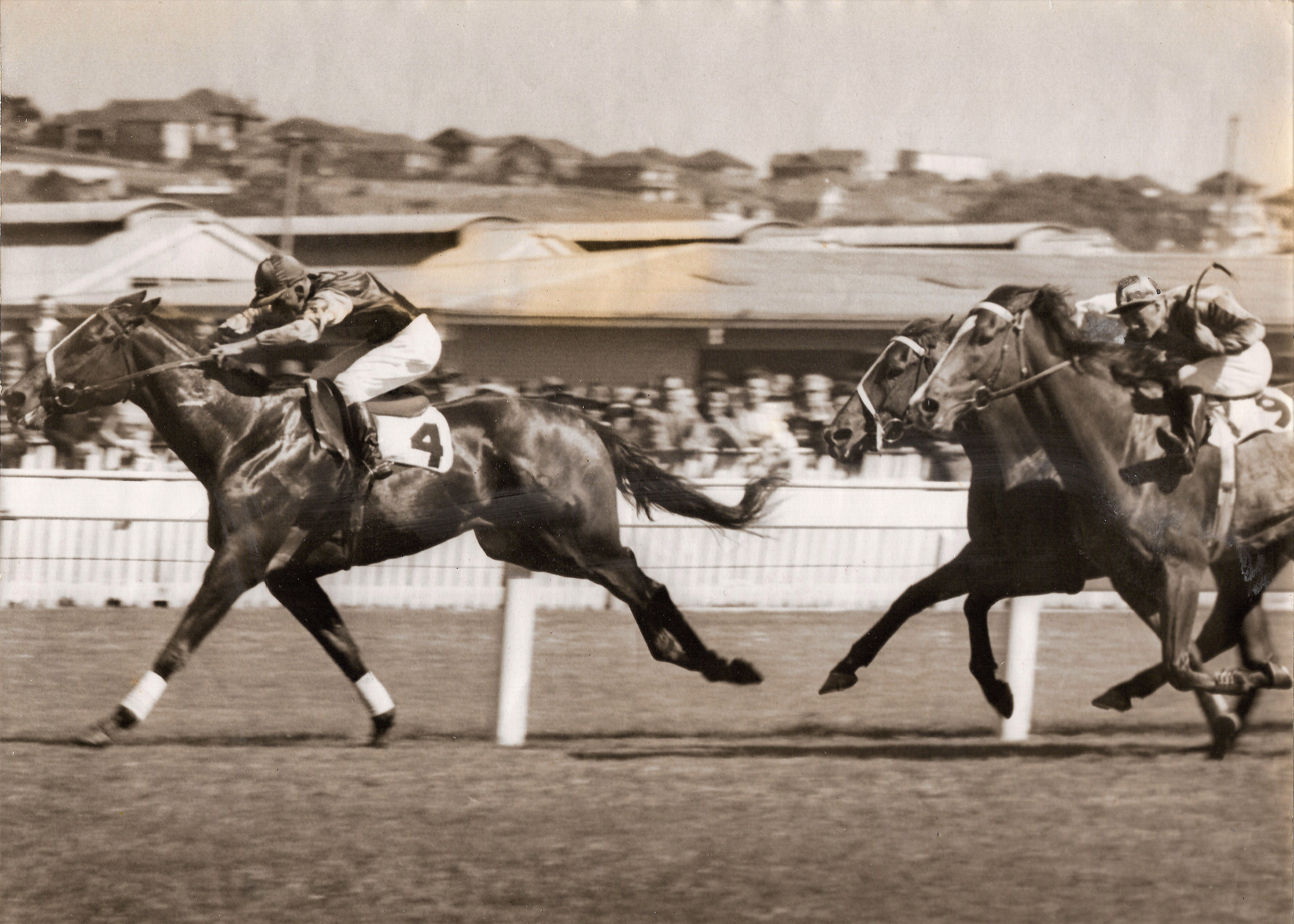
San Domenico, 1952 winner

== History ==
The race has a long history and presence in the AJC Autumn Meeting dating back to 1865. The race was open to any aged thoroughbred including 2 year olds. In 1885 the 2-year-old filly Astrœa was victorious.

The race attracted champions from every era that included Carbine, Wakeful, triple winner of the race Ajax, Tulloch and Tobin Bronze. In the modern era Rough Habit and Sunline won the race twice.

Prizemoney was increased in 2016 from $400,000 to $600,000.

=== Distance ===
- 1865–1972 - 1 mile
- 1973–2003 – 1600 metres
- 2004 onwards - 1400 metres

=== 1942 racebook ===
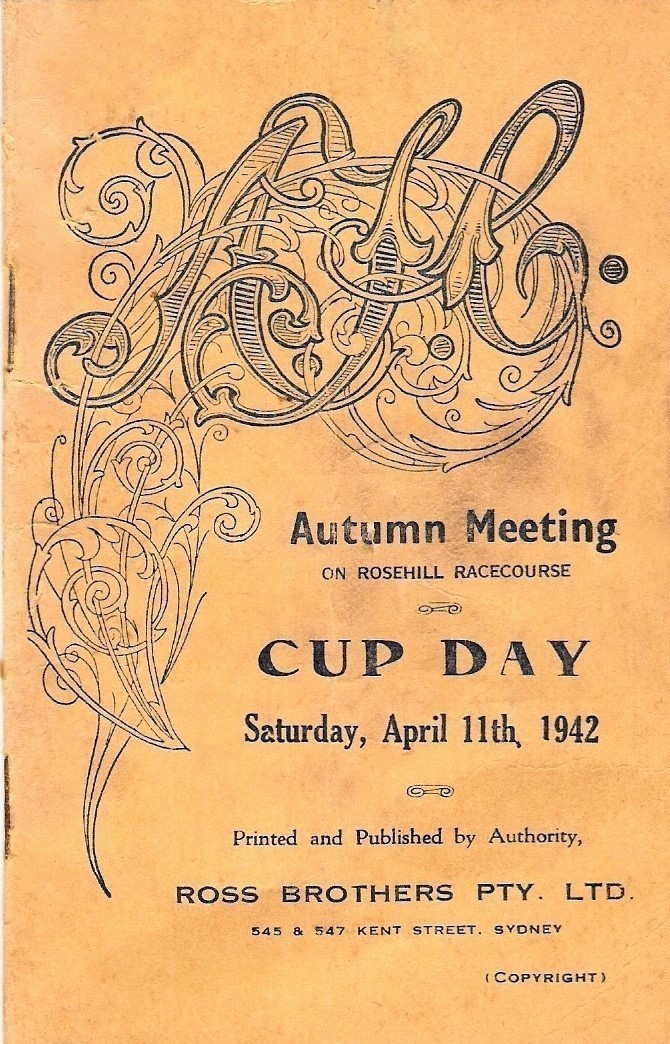
1942 AJC Sydney Cup racebook front cover

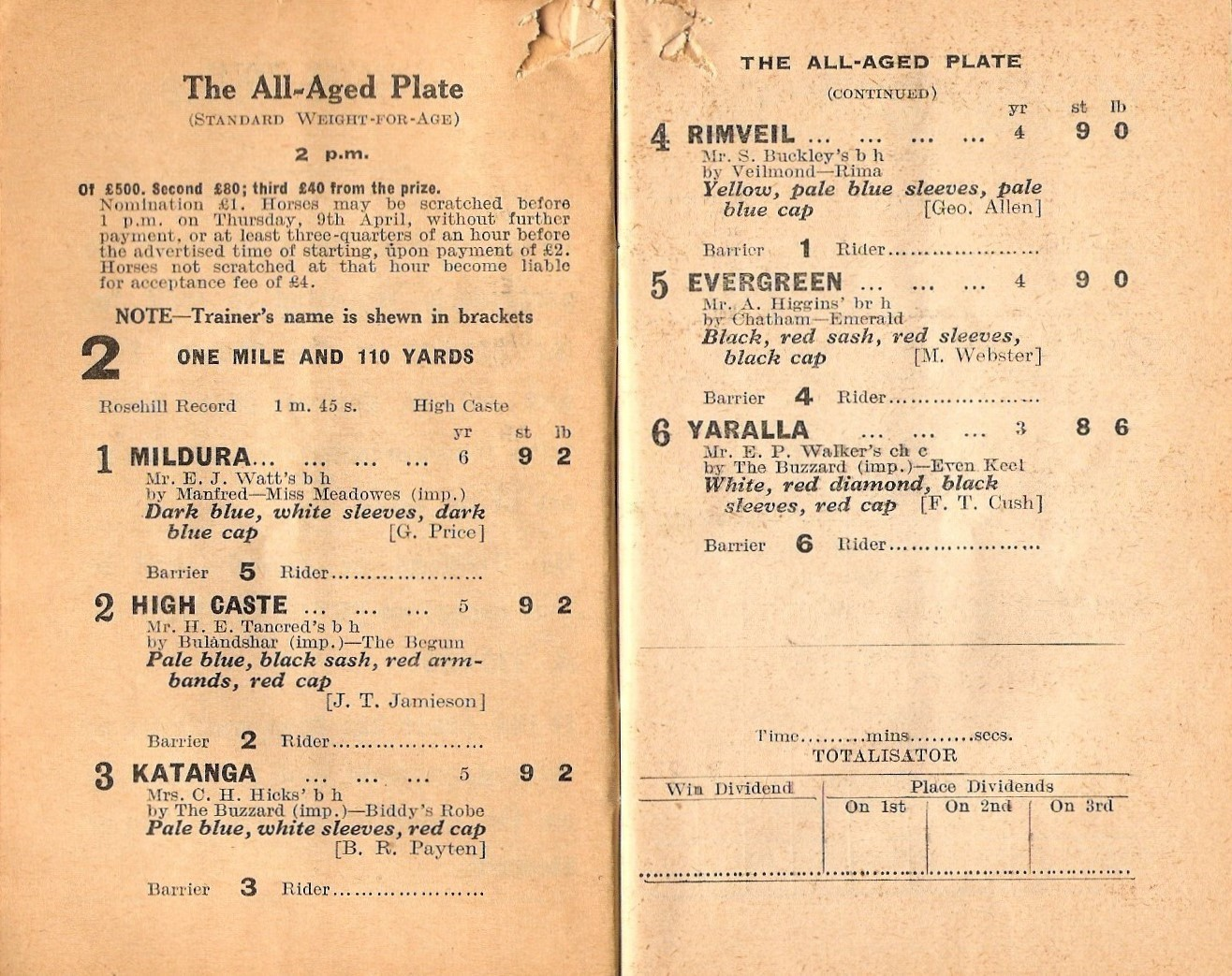
1942 AJC All Aged Plate page showing the winner, Yaralla

=== Gallery of noted winners ===
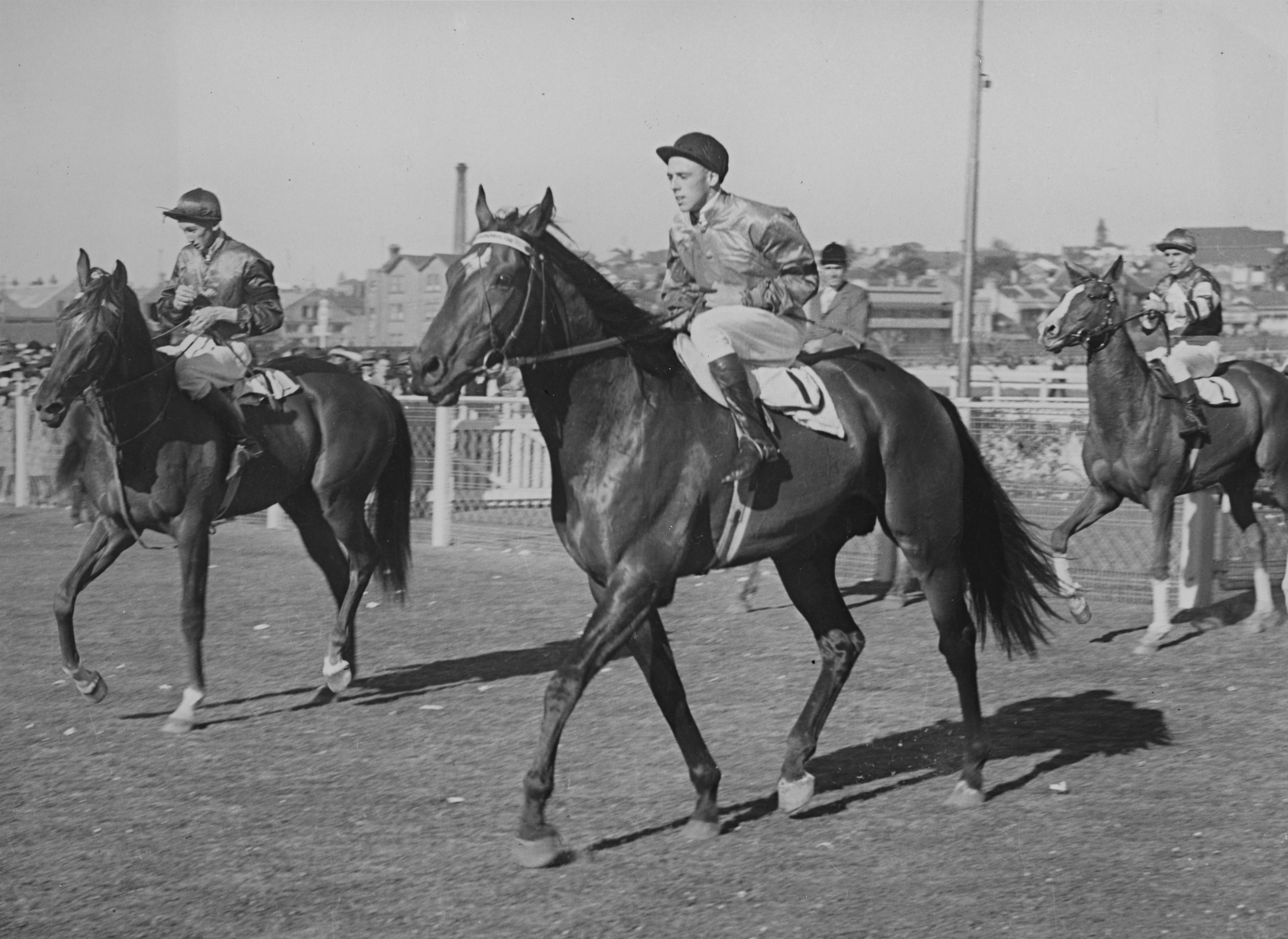
Bernborough, 1946 winner

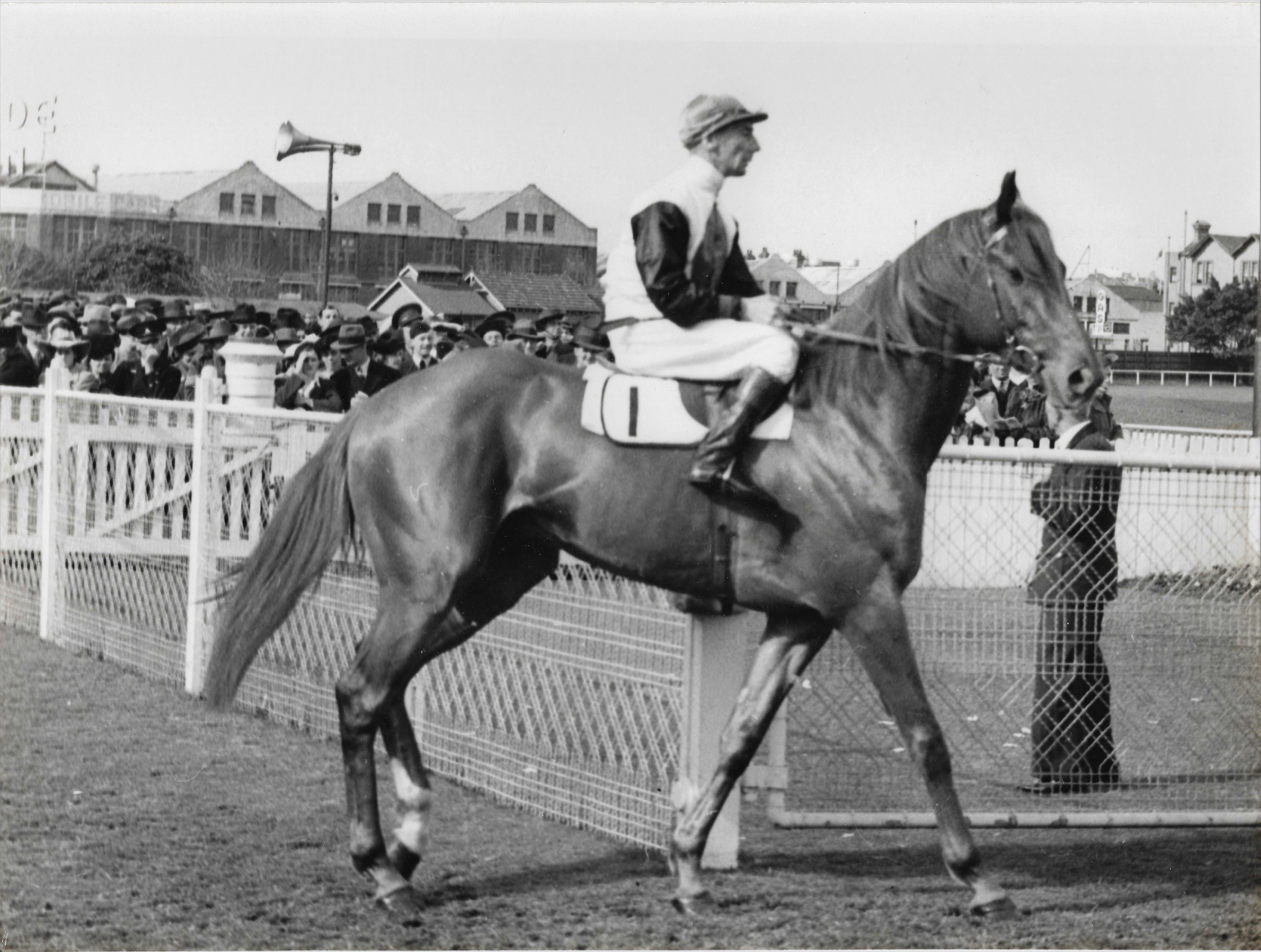
Yaralla, 1942 & 1943 winner

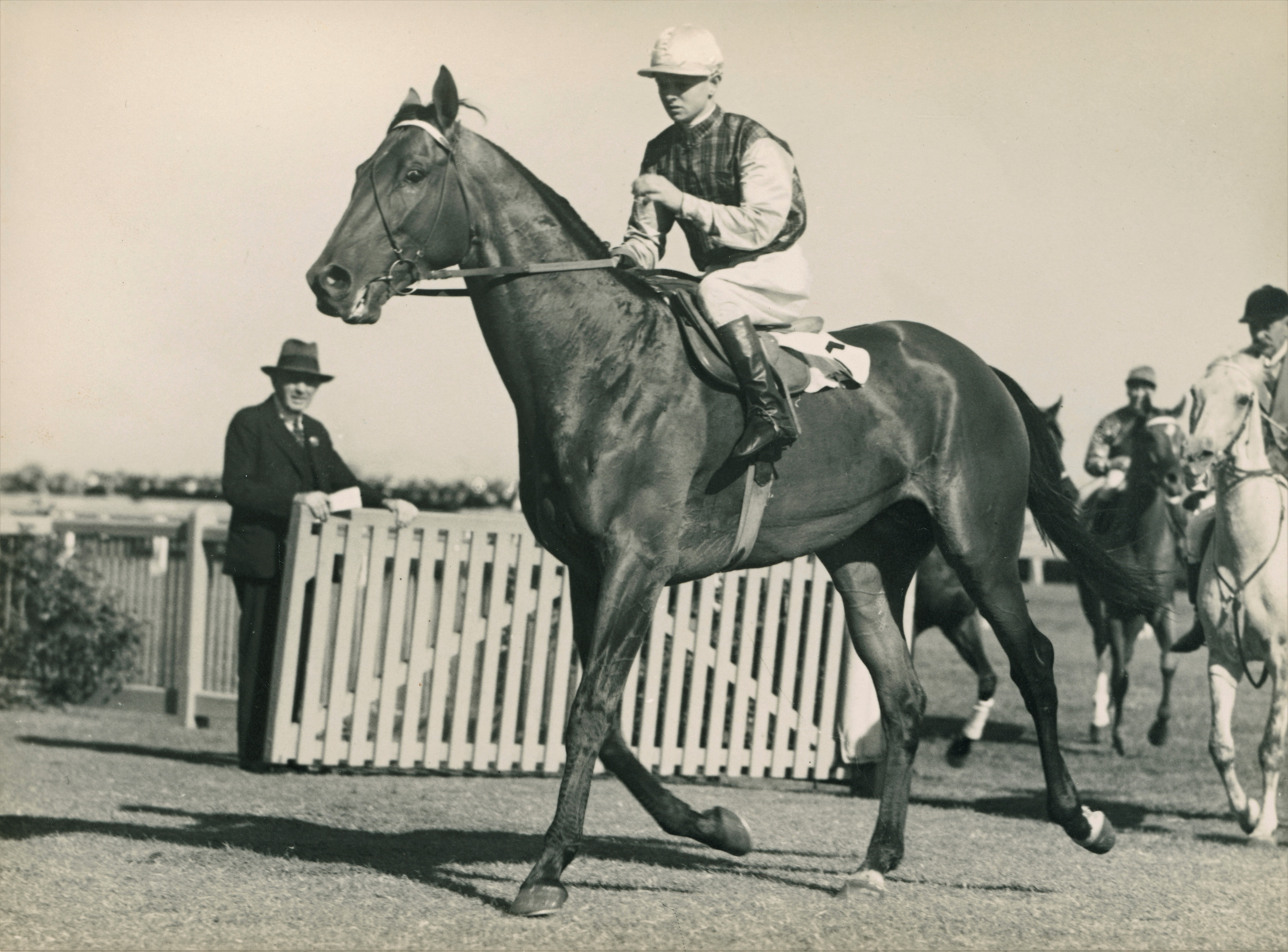
Winooka, 1933 winner

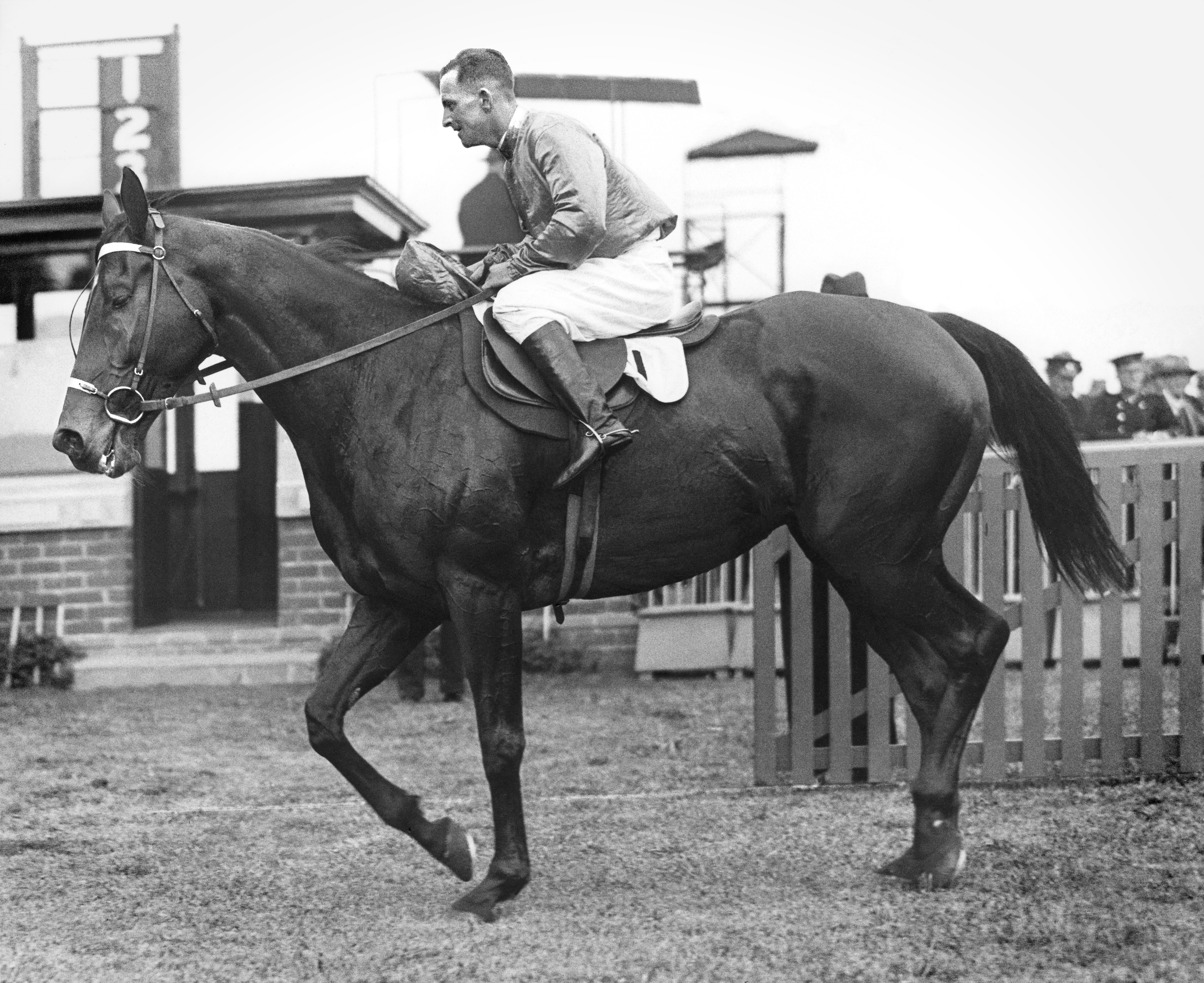
Amounis, 1930 winner

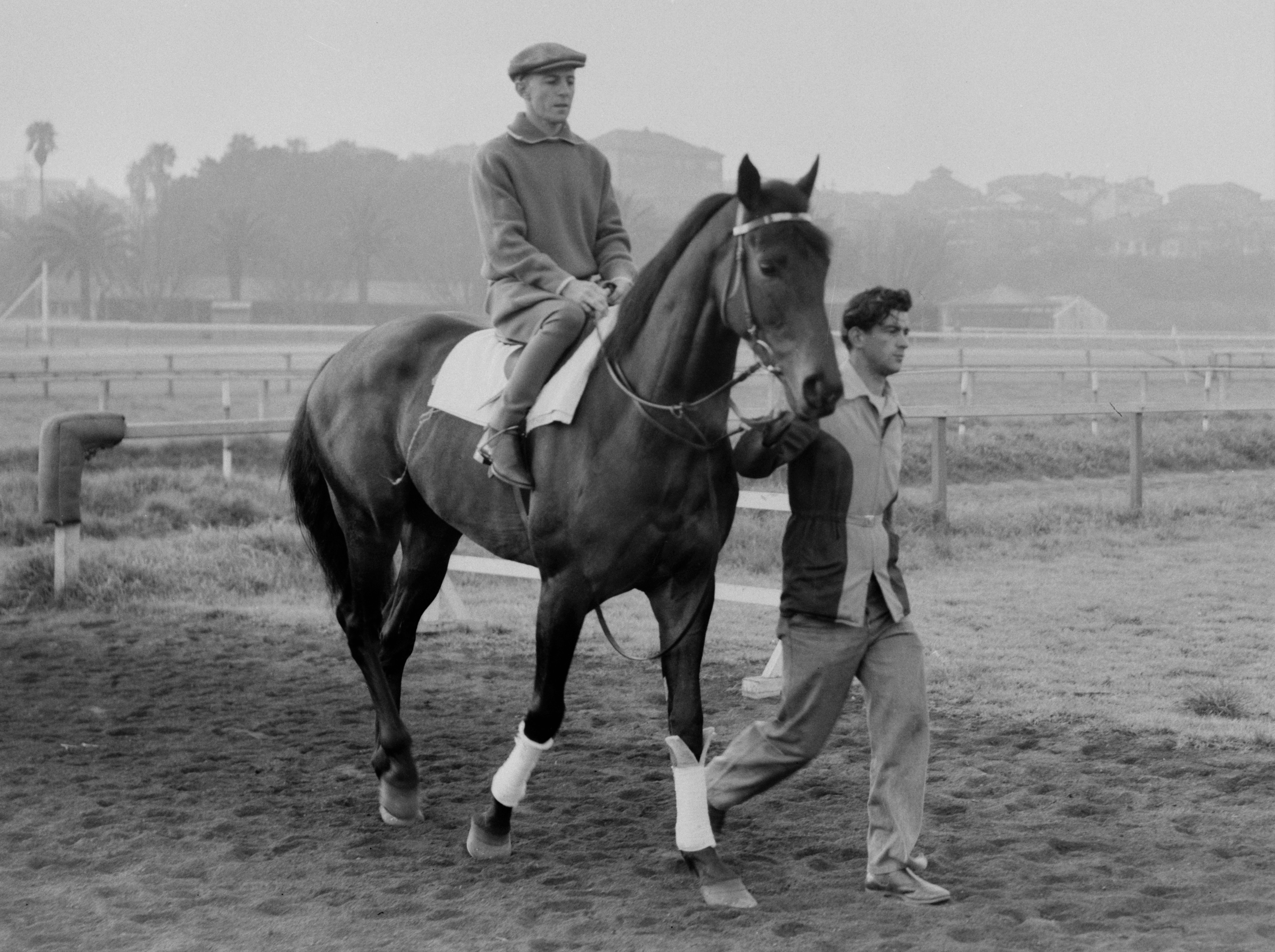
Prince Cortauld, 1954 winner

== Winners ==
The following are past winners of the race.

- 2026 - Beiwacht
- 2025 - Jimmysstar
- 2024 - Magic Time
- 2023 - Giga Kick
- 2022 - Cascadian
- 2021 - Kolding
- 2020 - Tofane
- 2019 - Pierata
- 2018 - Trapeze Artist
- 2017 - Tivaci
- 2016 - English
- 2015 - Dissident
- 2014 - Hana's Goal
- 2013 - All Too Hard
- 2012 - Atlantic Jewel
- 2011 - Hay List
- 2010 - Hot Danish
- 2009 - Danleigh
- 2008 - Racing To Win
- 2007 - Bentley Biscuit
- 2006 - Paratroopers
- 2005 - Shamekha
- 2004 - Private Steer
- 2003 - Arlington Road
- 2002 - Sunline
- 2001 - El Mirada
- 2000 - Sunline
- 1999 - Intergaze
- 1998 - Des's Dream
- 1997 - All Our Mob
- 1996 - Flying Spur
- 1995 - Hurricane Sky
- 1994 - Prince Of Praise
- 1993 - Rough Habit
- 1992 - Rough Habit
- 1991 - Shaftesbury Avenue
- 1990 - Eastern Classic
- 1989 - Card Shark
- 1988 - Sound Horizon
- 1987 - Campaign King
- 1986 - Drawn
- 1985 - Vite Cheval
- 1984 - Emancipation
- 1983 - Rare Form
- 1982 - My Gold Hope
- 1981 - Watney
- 1980 - Bit Of A Skite
- 1979 - Belmura Lad
- 1978 - Always Welcome
- 1977 - Dalrello
- 1976 - Dalrello
- 1975 - Gilt Patten
- 1974 - Tontonan
- 1973 - All Shot
- 1972 - Triton
- 1971 - Abdul
- 1970 - Broker's Tip
- 1969 - Foresight
- 1968 - Unpainted
- 1967 - Tobin Bronze
- 1966 - Even Better
- 1965 - Scottish Soldier
- 1964 - Wenona Girl
- 1963 - Kilshery
- 1962 - Kilshery
- 1961 - Sky High
- 1960 - Noholme
- 1959 - Lord
- 1958 - Tulloch
- 1957 - Kingster
- 1956 - King's Fair
- 1955 - Prince Morvi
- 1954 - Prince Cortauld
- 1953 - Red Jester
- 1952 - San Domenico
- 1951 - Achilles
- 1950 - The Groom
- 1949 - Phoibos
- 1948 - Murray Stream
- 1947 - Victory Lad
- 1946 - Bernborough
- 1945 - Cold Shower
- 1944 - Katanga
- 1943 - Yaralla
- 1942 - Yaralla
- 1941 - Gold Salute
- 1940 - Ajax
- 1939 - Ajax
- 1938 - Ajax
- 1937 - Regular Bachelor
- 1936 - Cuddle
- 1935 - Peter Pan
- 1934 - Chatham
- 1933 - Winooka
- 1932 - Viol D'amour
- 1931 - Sir Chrystopher
- 1930 - Amounis
- 1929 - Mollison
- 1928 - Limerick
- 1927 - Fujisan
- 1926 - Valicare
- 1925 - The Hawk
- 1924 - Claro
- 1923 - Purser
- 1922 - Beauford
- 1921 - Speciality
- 1920 - Chrysolaus
- 1919 - Greenstead
- 1918 - Desert Gold
- 1917 - Whitefield
- 1916 - Woorak
- 1915 - Spurn
- 1914 - Cider
- 1913 - Jolly Beggar
- 1912 - Malt King
- 1911 - Malt King
- 1910 - Bobrikoff
- 1909 - Montcalm
- 1908 - Mountain King
- 1907 - Lady Wallace
- 1906 - Charles Stuart
- 1905 - Gladsome
- 1904 - Gladsome
- 1903 - Emir
- 1902 - Wakeful
- 1901 - Advance
- 1900 - Sequence
- 1899 - Merloolas
- 1898 - Bobadil
- 1897 - Hopscotch
- 1896 - Tire
- 1895 - Georgic
- 1894 - Marvel
- 1893 - Cremorne
- 1892 - Bungebah
- 1891 - Marvel
- 1890 - Carbine
- 1889 - Carbine
- 1888 - Lady Betty
- 1887 - Matador
- 1886 - Cerise And Blue
- 1885 - Astrœa
- 1884 - Brown And Rose
- 1883 - Archie
- 1882 - Wheatear
- 1881 - Etna
- 1880 - Faublas
- 1879 - Avernus
- 1878 - Bosworth
- 1877 - Tocal
- 1876 - Briseis
- 1875 - Lurline
- 1874 - Fitz-Yattendon
- 1873 - The Ace
- 1872 - Hamlet
- 1871 - Tim Whiffler
- 1870 - Tim Whiffler
- 1869 - Glencoe
- 1868 - Fireworks
- 1867 - Yattendon
- 1866 - †Falcon
- 1865 - Maid of the Lake

†The Pitsford was first past the post but was disqualified.

== See also ==
- Champagne Stakes (ATC)
- Frank Packer Plate
- Hall Mark Stakes
- James H B Carr Stakes
- Japan Racing Association Plate
- List of Australian Group races
- Group races
