= Hall Mark Stakes =

Australian horse race

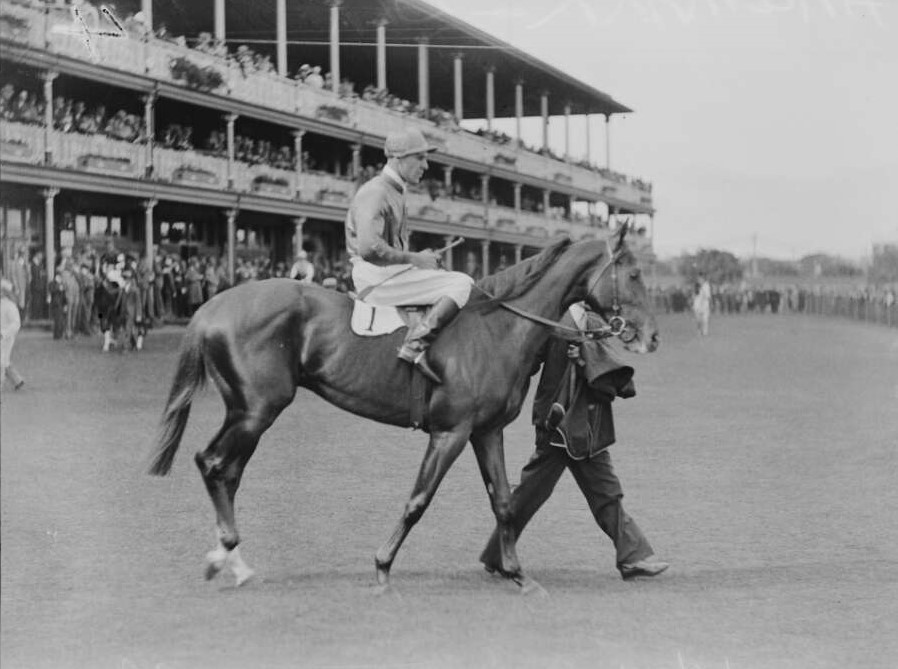
- Hall Mark and Darby Munro
- Class: Group 3
- Location: Randwick Racecourse; Sydney, Australia
- Inaugurated: 1978
- Race type: Thoroughbred – Flat racing
- Sponsor: TAB (2017-26)

Race information
- Distance: 1,200 metres
- Surface: Turf
- Track: Right-handed
- Qualification: Three years old and older
- Weight: Set weights with penalties
- Purse: $250,000 (2026)

The Hall Mark Stakes is an Australian Turf Club Group 3 Thoroughbred horse race under set weights with penalty conditions for horses three years old and older, held over a distance of 1200 metres at Randwick Racecourse, Sydney, Australia in April.

== History ==
The race is named in honour of Hall Mark, who won four signature events at the Sydney Autumn Carnival during his career (1933–36) – AJC Doncaster Handicap, AJC Derby, AJC Champagne Stakes, AJC Sires' Produce Stakes.

In 2026 Mazu, trained by Joseph Pride and ridden by Rachel King, won the race for the 3rd time in succession. Further, this race was the only race he had won in those three years.

=== Distance ===
- 1978 – 1600 metres
- 1979 – 2000 metres
- 1980 onwards - 1200 metres

=== Grade ===
- 1979 - 2013 - Listed race
- 2014 onwards - Group 3

== Winners ==
The following are past winners of the race.

- 2026 - Mazu
- 2025 - Mazu
- 2024 - Mazu
- 2023 - Vilana
- 2022 - Kementari
- 2021 - Splintex
- 2020 - Greyworm
- 2019 - Trekking
- 2018 - Burning Passion
- 2017 - Redzel
- 2016 - Music Magnate
- 2015 - Our Boy Malachi
- 2014 - Hot Snitzel
- 2013 - Rarefied
- 2012 - Tiger Tees
- 2011 - Ladys Angel
- 2010 - Ego's Dare
- 2009 - Kroner
- 2008 - Wasted Emotions
- 2007 - Anwaar
- 2006 - Falaise
- 2005 - Presently
- 2004 - Academe
- 2003 - Polygram
- 2002 - Canny Fly
- 2001 - Juggling Time
- 2000 - King Lotto
- 1999 - Life Of Riley
- 1998 - Little Lucifer
- 1997 - Winning Hand
- 1996 - Madison Point
- 1995 - Cohort
- 1994 - All Our Mob
- 1993 - Simonstad
- 1992 - Mocha
- 1991 - Euclase
- 1990 - Dieu D'Or
- 1989 - Tumble On
- 1988 - Tumble On
- 1987 - Targlish
- 1986 - Rich Fields Lad
- 1985 - All Chant
- 1984 - Vain Karioi
- 1983 - Toy Pindarri
- 1982 - My Evita
- 1981 - Oswonder
- 1980 - Thai Jewel
- 1979 - Down The Aisle

== See also ==
- All Aged Stakes
- Champagne Stakes (ATC)
- Frank Packer Plate
- James H B Carr Stakes
- Japan Racing Association Plate
- List of Australian Group races
- Group races
