= Champagne Stakes (ATC) =

Horse race in Sydney, Australia

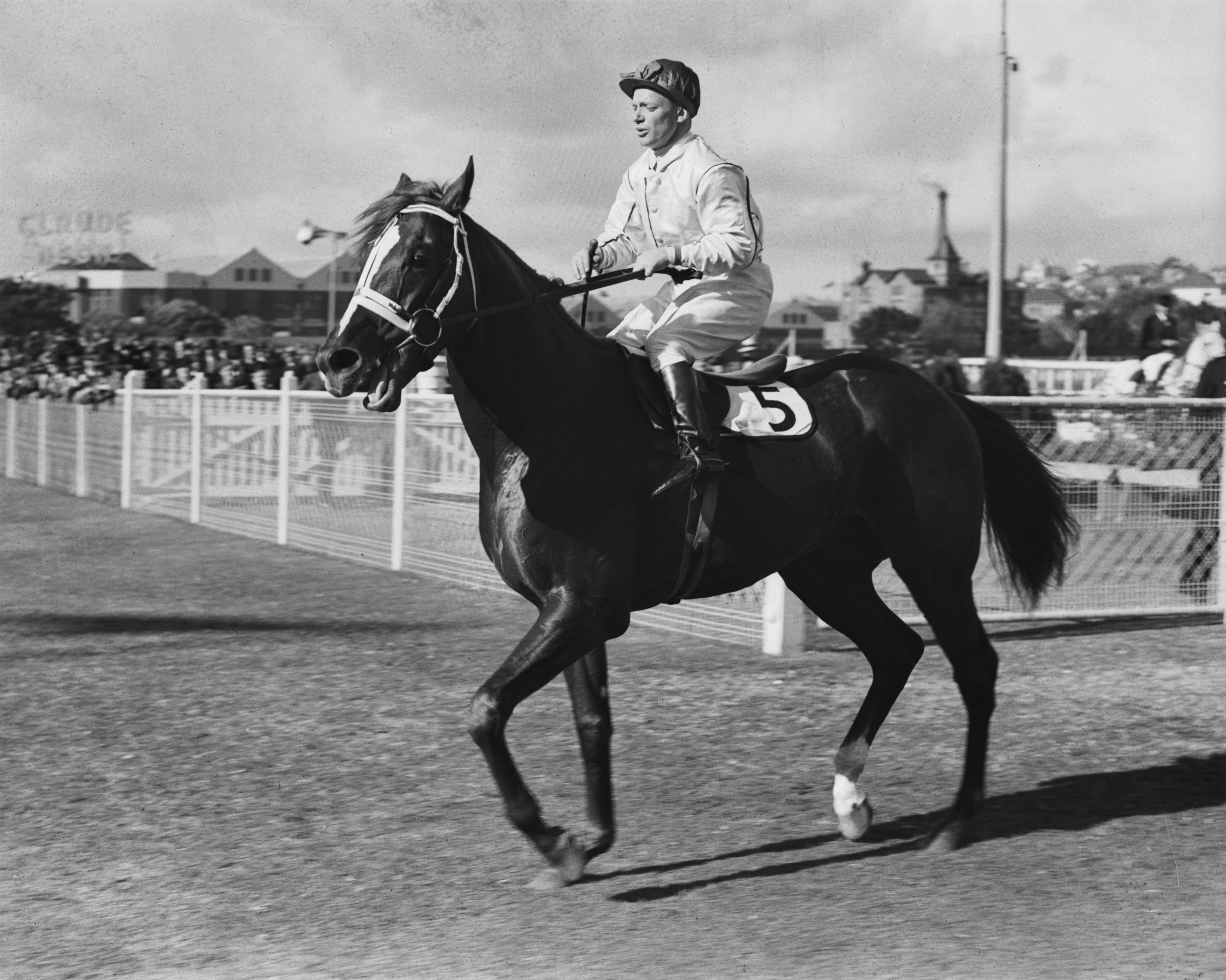
- Ajax, 1937 winner
- Class: Group 1
- Location: Randwick Racecourse; Sydney, Australia
- Inaugurated: 1861
- Race type: Thoroughbred - flat
- Sponsor: Moët & Chandon (2009-26)

Race information
- Distance: 1,600 metres
- Surface: Turf
- Track: Right-handed
- Qualification: Two year old
- Weight: Set weights colts and geldings – 56 1/2 kg fillies – 54 1/2 kg
- Purse: A$1,000,000 (2026)

The Champagne Stakes is an Australian Turf Club Group 1 horse race for two-year-old Thoroughbreds at set weights run at Randwick Racecourse, Sydney, Australia, over a distance of 1,600 metres during the Sydney Autumn Carnival.

Flight, 1943 winner

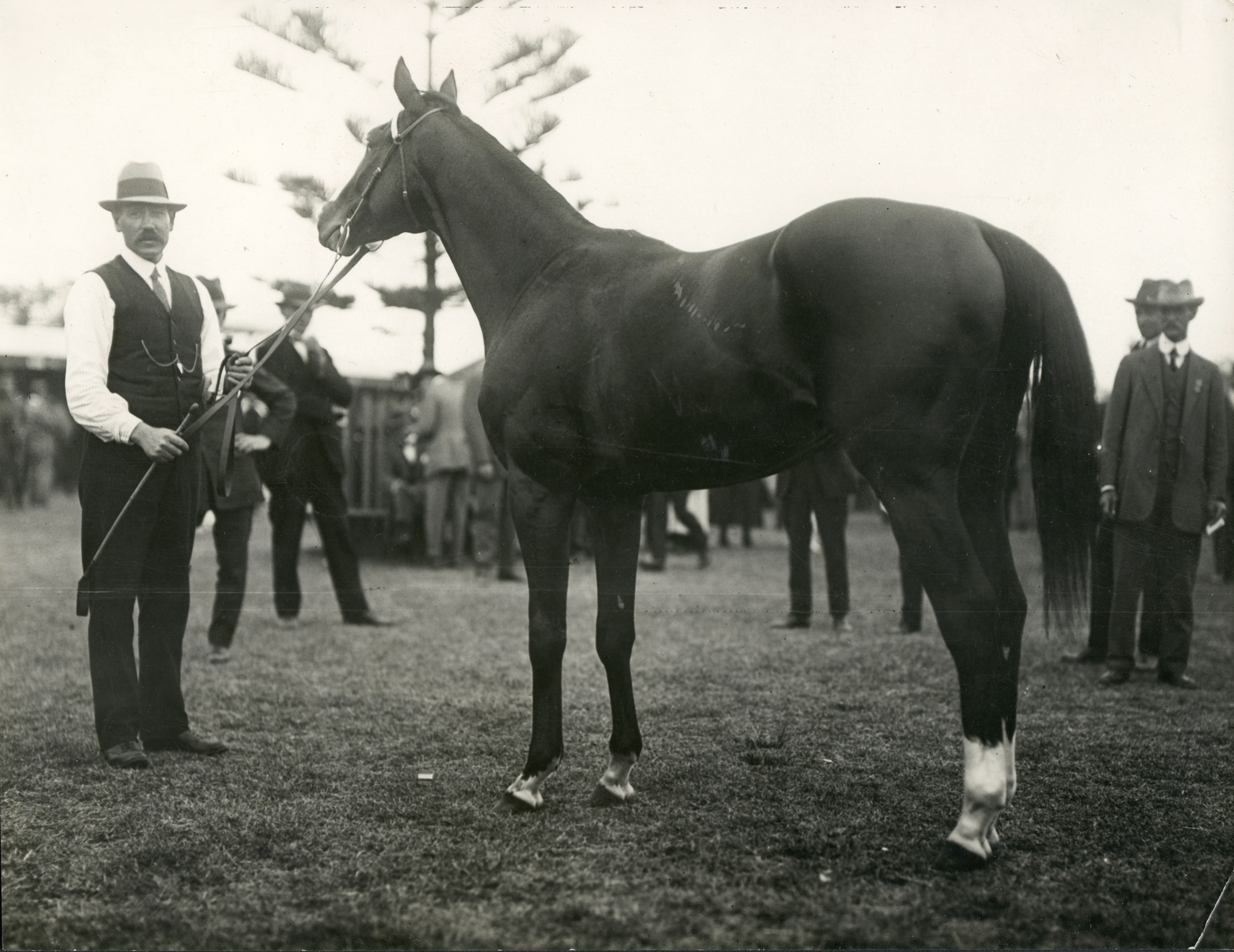
Outlook, 1918 winner

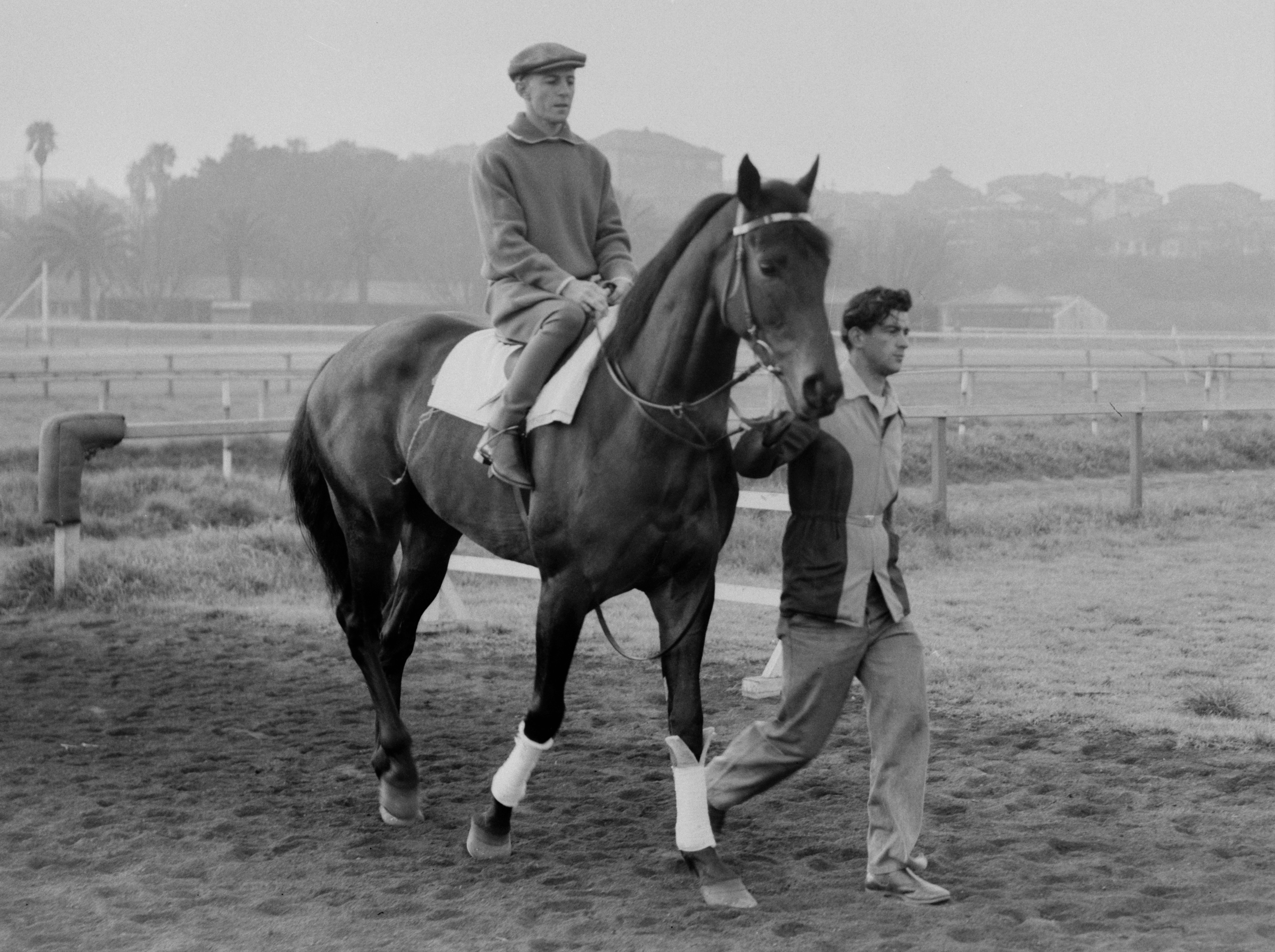
Prince Cortauld, 1953 winner

== History ==
The inaugural running of the race was on the second day of the Australian Jockey Club Autumn Meet in 1861 as the fourth race on the six race card. The winner was Exeter trained by the famous trainer of the time Etienne de Mestre. The race became the premier AJC sprint race for two-year-olds for nearly 80 years. With the introduction of the richer Golden Slipper Stakes in 1957, the AJC decided on extending the distance of the race to 1 mile (1972) and as such creating a natural progression for elite two year old races that is now known as the Juvenile Triple Crown – Golden Slipper Stakes, Sires Produce Stakes (ATC) and Champagne Stakes.

Six two-year-olds have won the Triple Crown:
Baguette (1970), Luskin Star (1977), Tierce (1991), Burst (1992), Dance Hero (2004), Pierro (2012)

=== 1914 racebook ===
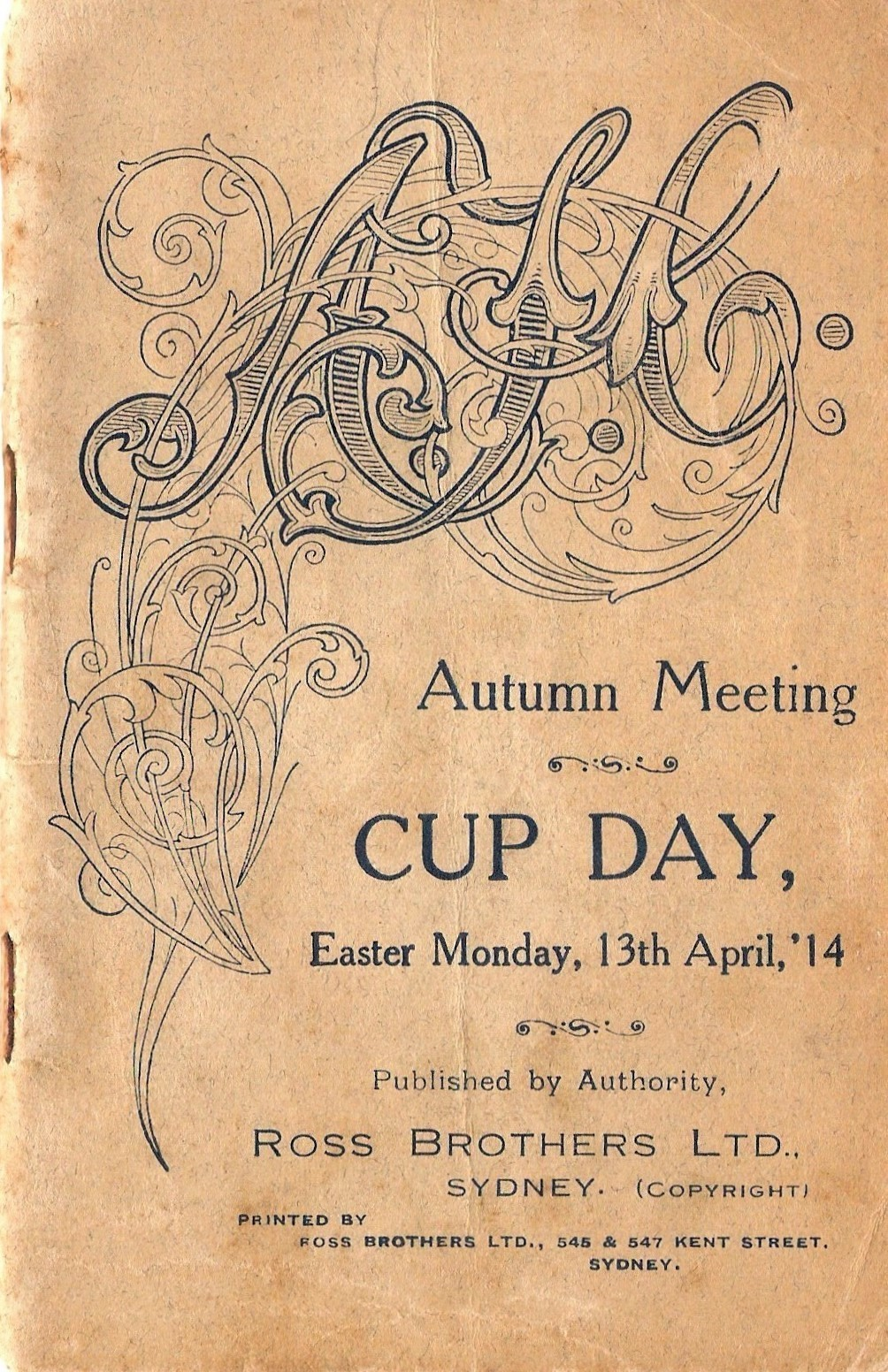
1914 AJC Sydney Cup racebook front cover

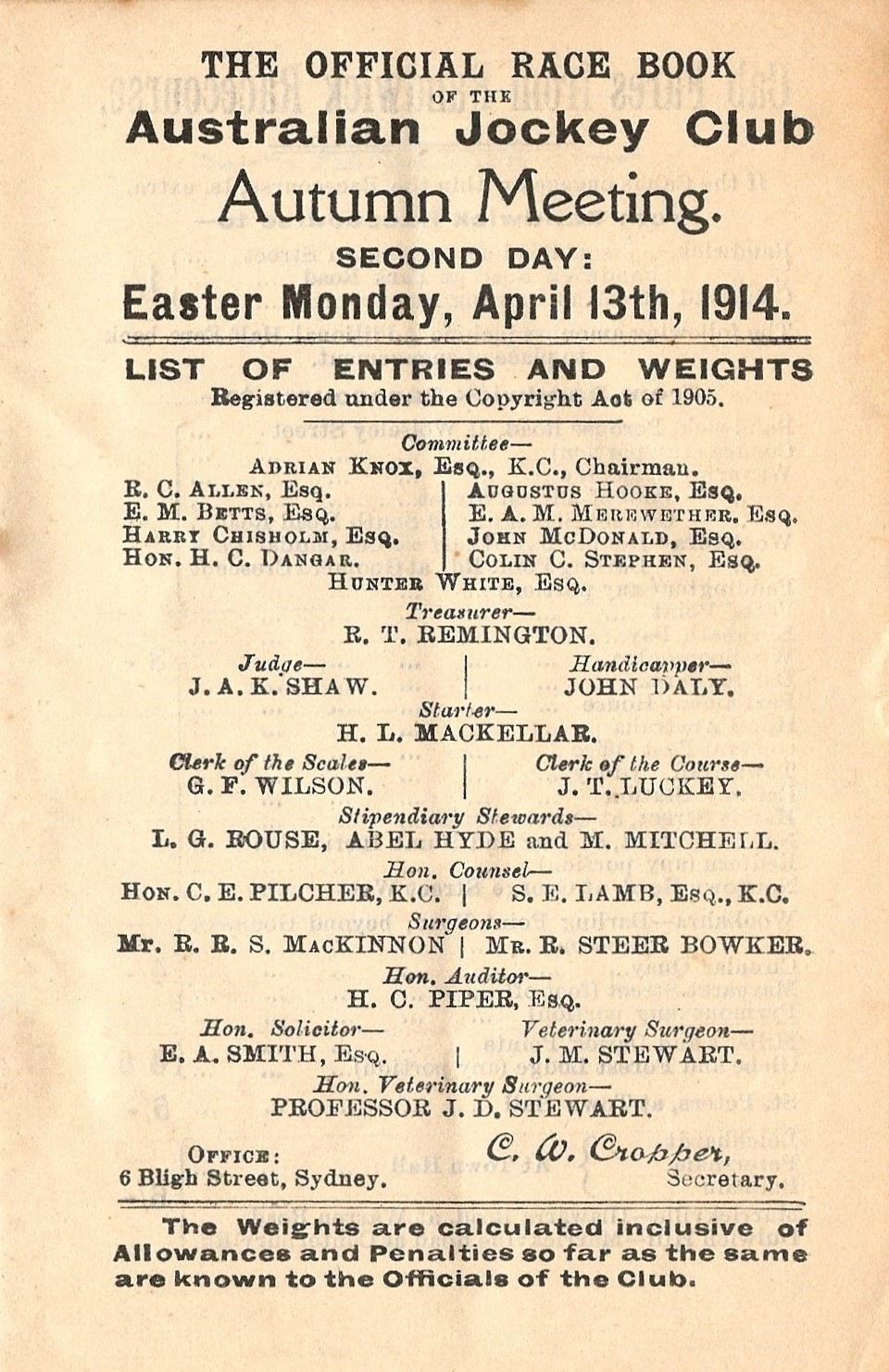
1914 AJC Champagne Stakes page showing raceday officials

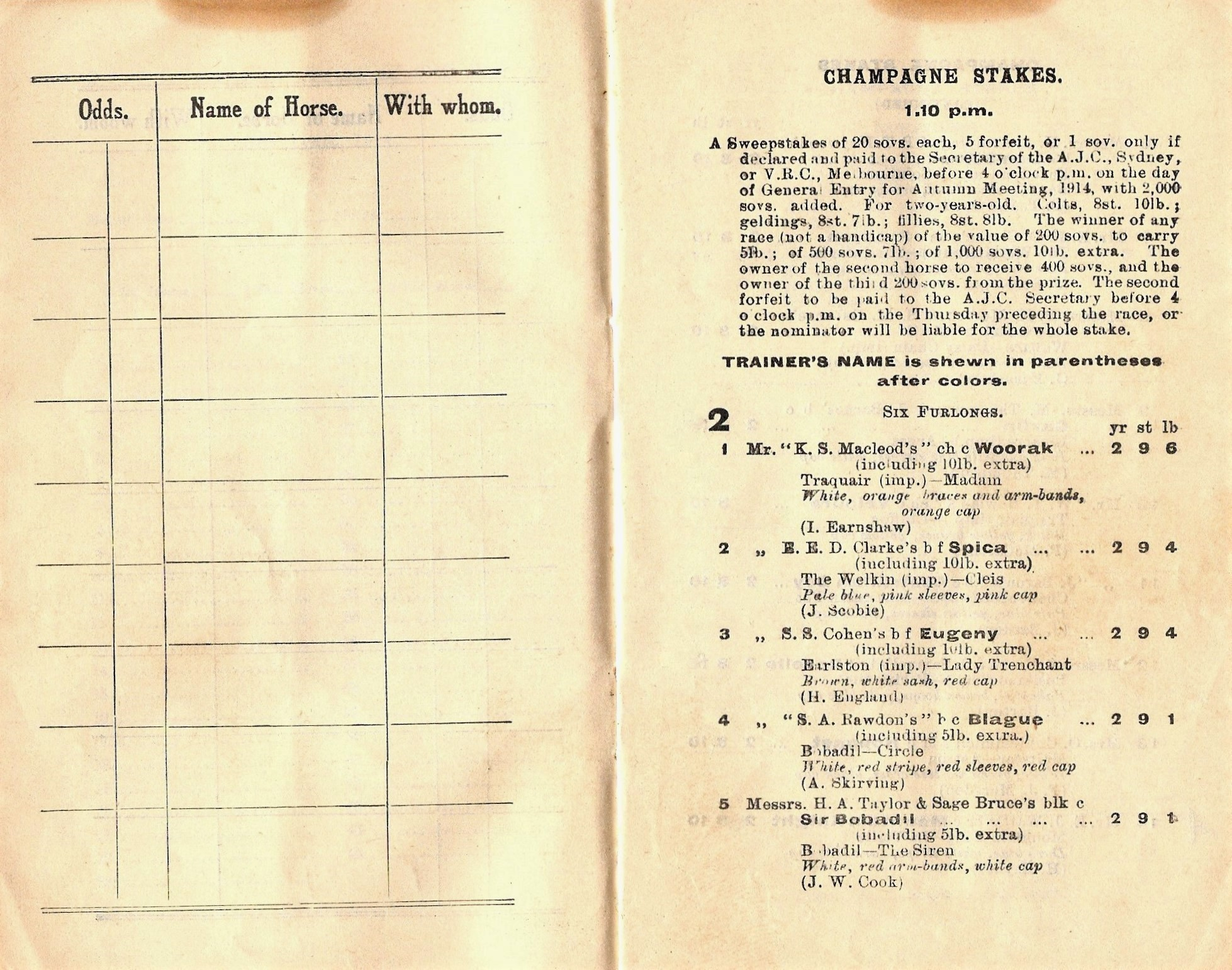
1914 AJC Champagne Stakes page showing the winner, Woorak

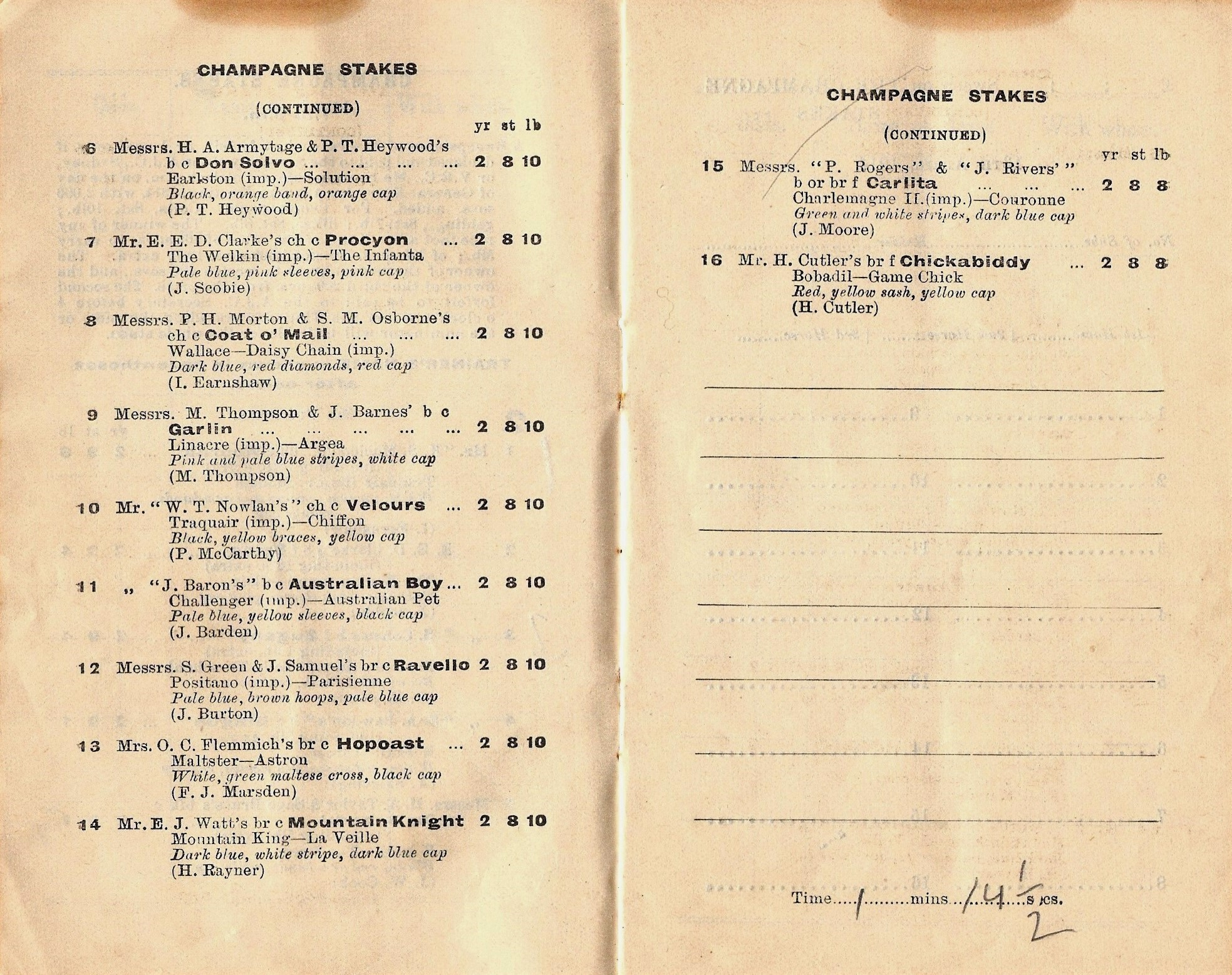
1914 AJC Champagne Stakes page starters and results

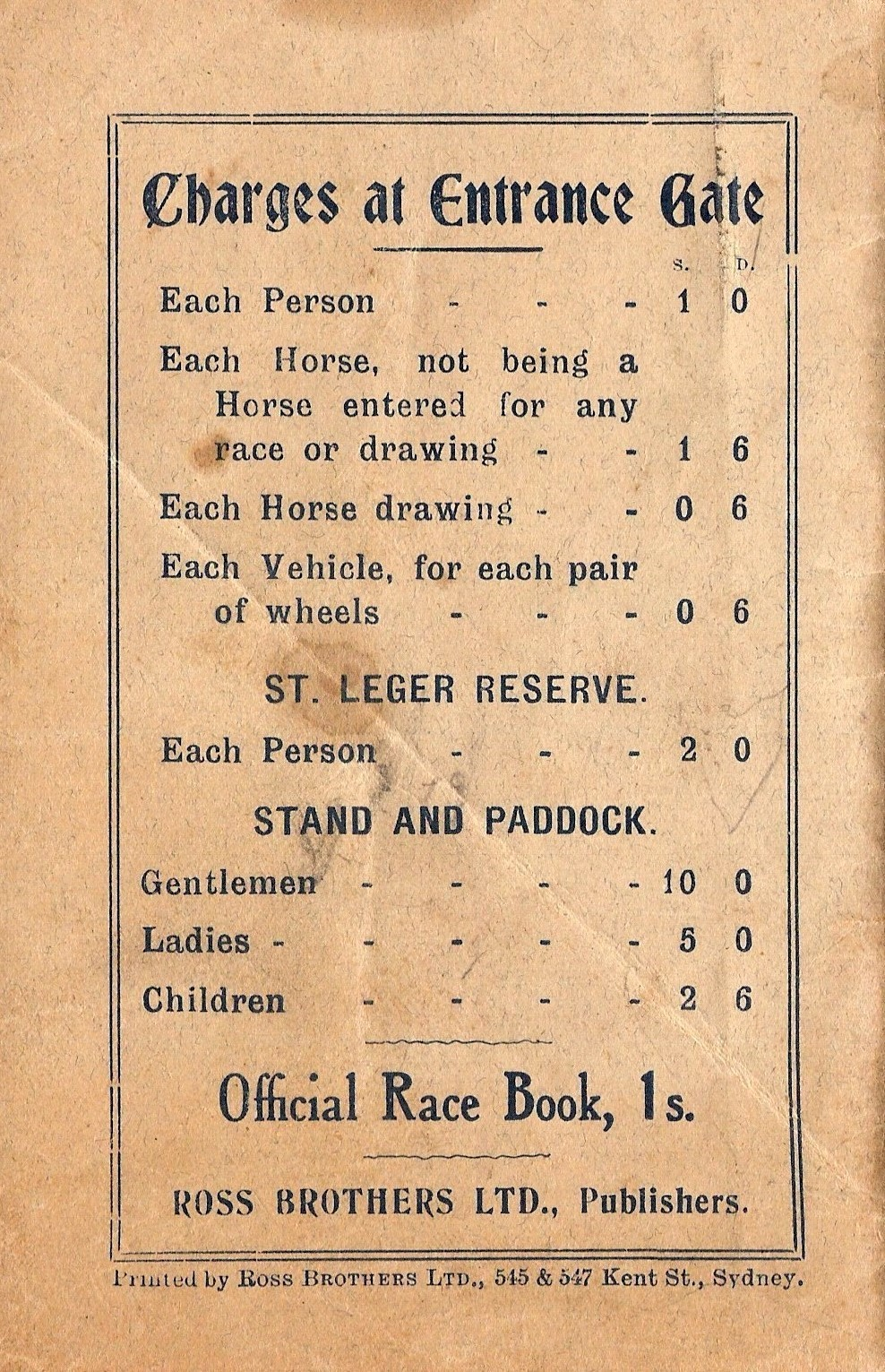
Back cover showing entrance gate charges

=== Records ===
The record time for the race when the distance was 6 furlongs was by Vain in 1969 when he won by 10 lengths in a time of 1:09.40. At the time Vain became the richest money earning two year old in Australia.

The record time for the current 1600 metres distance is 1:33.31 set by Castelvecchio in 2019.

=== Distance ===
- 1861 - 5 furlongs (~1000m)
- 1862–1864 - 1 mile (~1600m)
- 1865–1866 - 7 furlongs (~1400m)
- 1867–1880 - 5 furlongs (~1000m)
- 1881 - 6 furlongs (~1200m)
- 1882 - 5 furlongs (~1000m)
- 1883–1971 - 6 furlongs (~1200m)
- 1972 - 1 mile (~1600m)
- 1973 onwards - 1600 metres

=== Gallery of noted winners ===
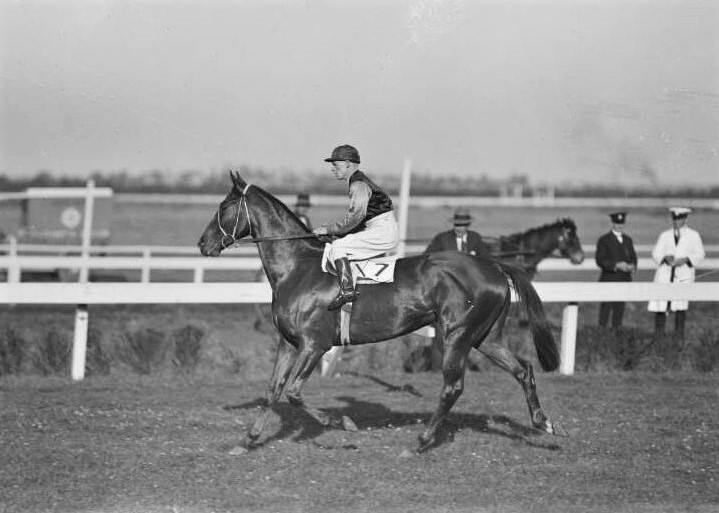
Manfred, 1925 winner

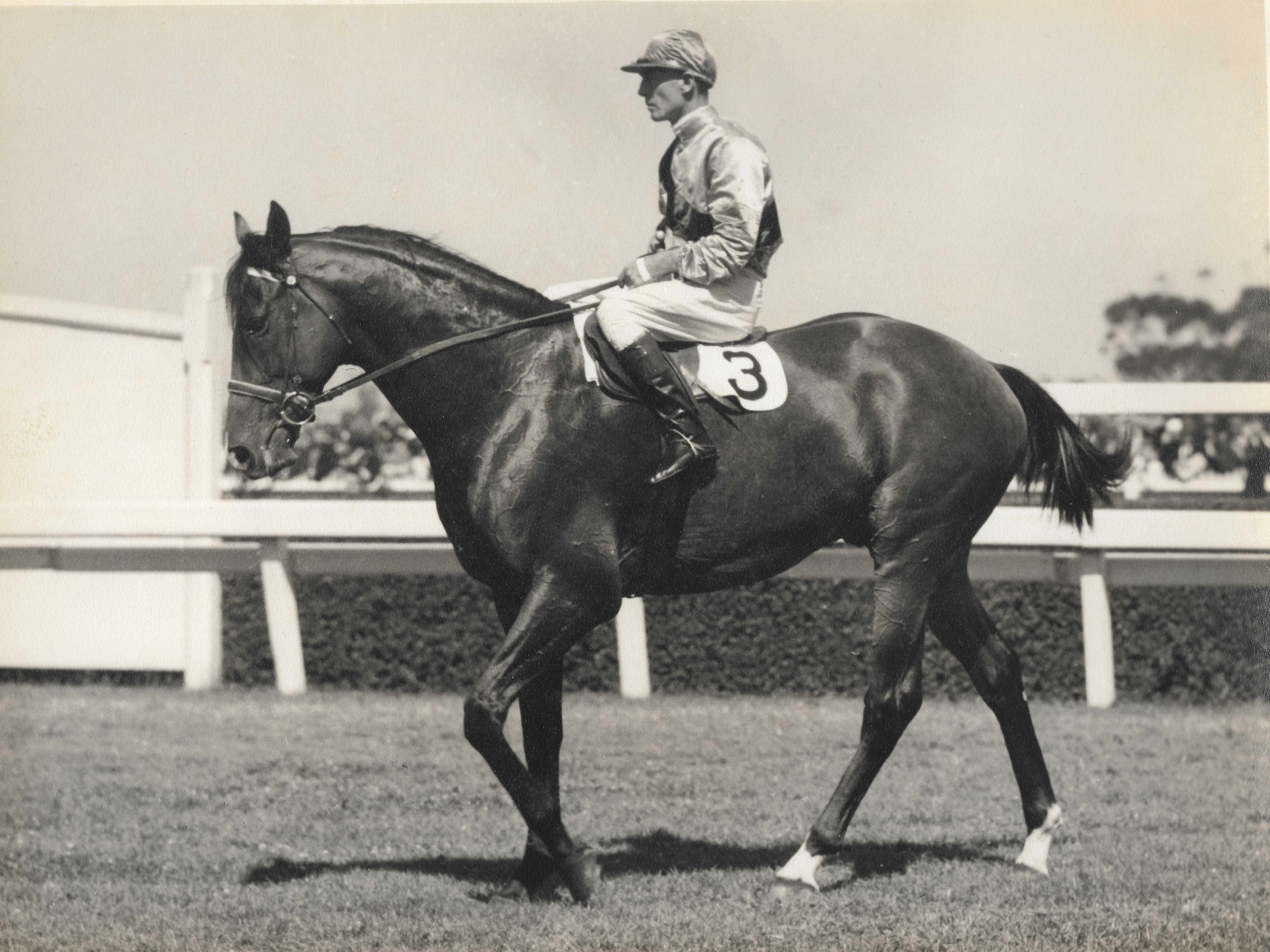
High Caste, 1939 winner

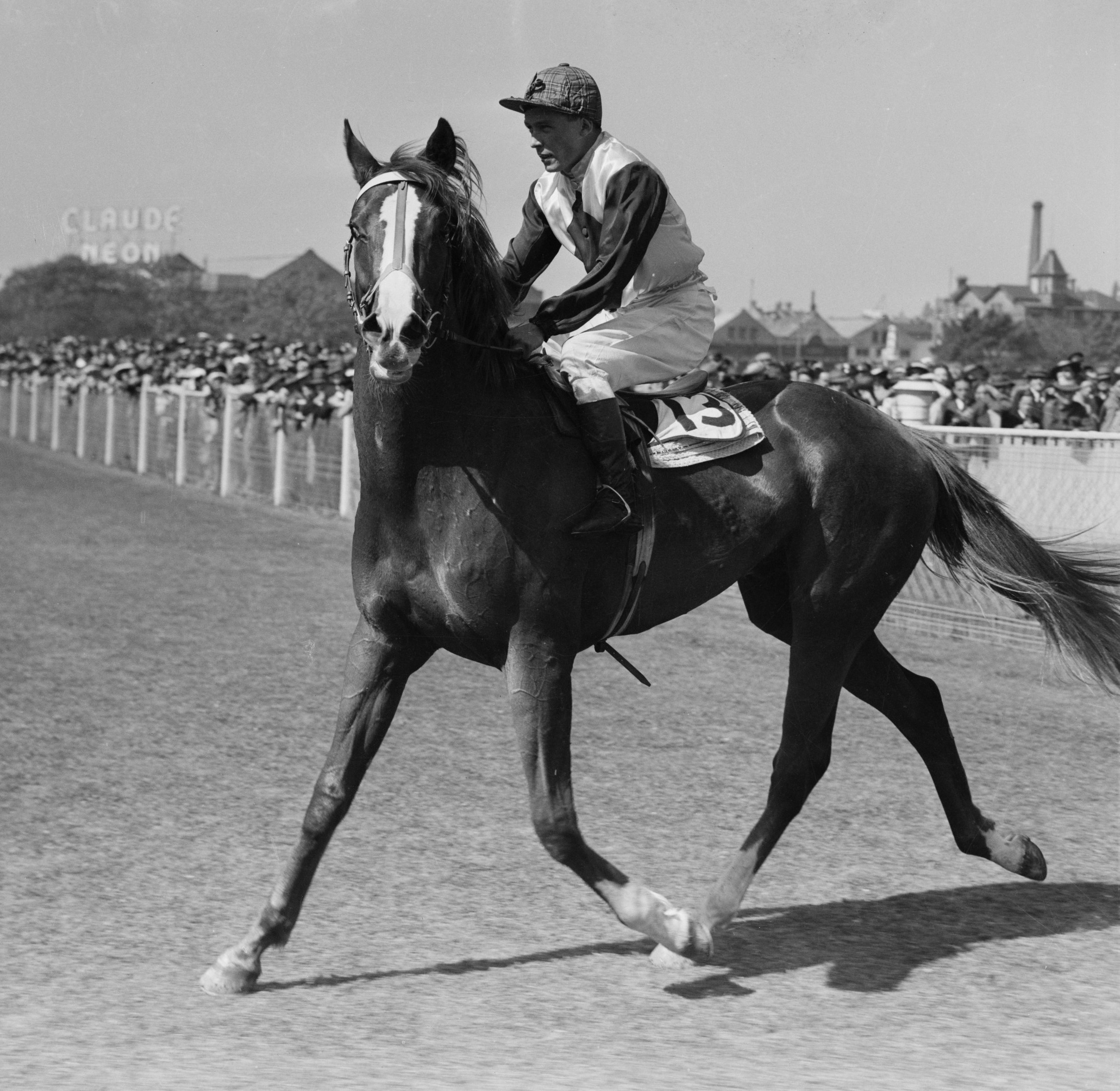
Magnificent, 1945 winner

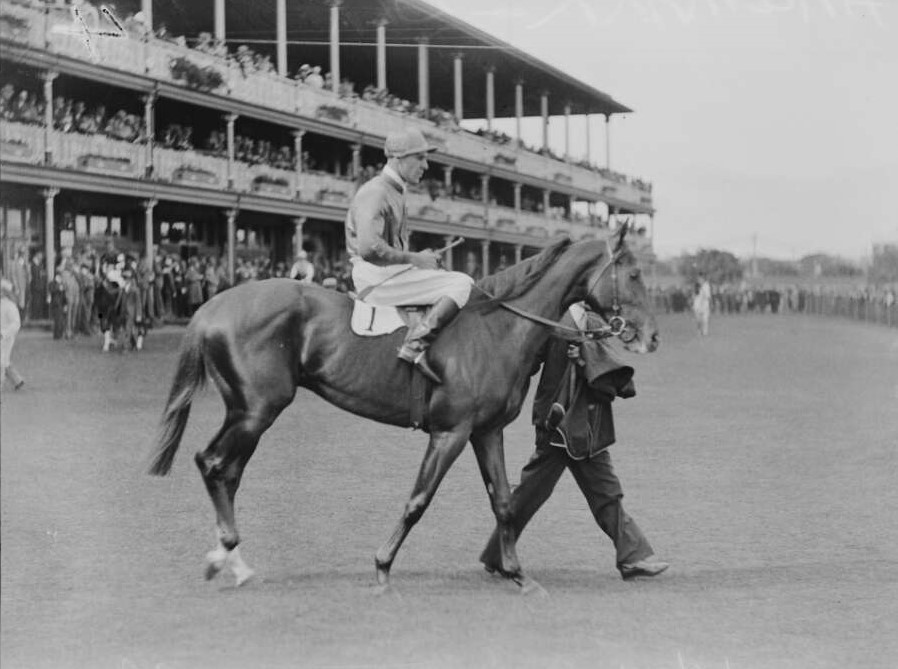
Hall Mark, 1933 winner

== Winners ==
The following are past winners of the race.

- 2026 - Fireball
- 2025 - Nepotism
- 2024 - Broadsiding
- 2023 - Militarize
- 2022 - She's Extreme
- 2021 - Captivant
- 2020 - King's Legacy
- 2019 - Castelvecchio
- 2018 - Seabrook
- 2017 - The Mission
- 2016 - Prized Icon
- 2015 - Pasadena Girl
- 2014 - Go Indy Go
- 2013 - Guelph
- 2012 - Pierro
- 2011 - Helmet
- 2010 - Skilled
- 2009 - Onemorenomore
- 2008 - Samantha Miss
- 2007 - Meurice
- 2006 - Mentality
- 2005 - Carry On Cutie
- 2004 - Dance Hero
- 2003 - Hasna
- 2002 - Victory Vein
- 2001 - Viscount
- 2000 - Assertive Lad
- 1999 - Quick Star
- 1998 - Dracula
- 1997 - Encounter
- 1996 - Intergaze
- 1995 - Isolda
- 1994 - Euphoria
- 1993 - March Hare
- 1992 - Burst
- 1991 - Tierce
- 1990 - Triscay
- 1989 - Select Prince
- 1988 - Full And By
- 1987 - Sky Chase
- 1986 - Bounding Away
- 1985 - True Version
- 1984 - Red Anchor
- 1983 - Lady Eclipse
- 1982 - I Like Diamonds
- 1981 - Rose Of Kingston
- 1980 - Palaban
- 1979 - Charity
- 1978 - Parade
- 1977 - Luskin Star
- 1976 - Vivarchi
- 1975 - Rosie Heir
- 1974 - Zasu
- 1973 - Just Topic
- 1972 - Anjudy
- 1971 - Andros
- 1970 - Baguette
- 1969 - Vain
- 1968 - Rajah
- 1967 - Giulia
- 1966 - Storm Queen
- 1965 - Eye Liner
- 1964 - Farnworth
- 1963 - Time And Tide
- 1962 - Bogan Road
- 1961 - Columbia Star
- 1960 - Sky High
- 1959 - Noholme
- 1958 - Wiggle
- 1957 - Todman
- 1956 - Count Olin
- 1955 - Knave
- 1954 - Lindbergh
- 1953 - Prince Cortauld
- 1952 - French Echo
- 1951 - Ocean Bound
- 1950 - True Course
- 1949 - Lady Pirouette
- 1948 - Wattle
- 1947 - Temeraire
- 1946 - Persian Prince
- 1945 - Magnificent
- 1944 - Scaur Fel
- 1943 - Flight
- 1942 - Bangster
- 1941 - All Love
- 1940 - John
- 1939 - High Caste
- 1938 - Pandava
- 1937 - Ajax
- 1936 - Tonga
- 1935 - Young Idea
- 1934 - Great Legend
- 1933 - Hall Mark
- 1932 - Kuvera
- 1931 - Burwood
- 1930 - Chemosh
- 1929 - Parkwood
- 1928 - Mollison
- 1927 - Cannon
- 1926 - Rampion
- 1925 - Manfred
- 1924 - Heroic
- 1923 - Linaway
- 1922 - Rosina
- 1921 - Furious
- 1920 - Tressady Queen
- 1919 - Bigaroon
- 1918 - Outlook
- 1917 - Thrice
- 1916 - Wolaroi
- 1915 - Two
- 1914 - Woorak
- 1913 - Athenic
- 1912 - Cider
- 1911 - Posadas
- 1910 - Desert Rose
- 1909 - Malt King
- 1908 - Malt Queen
- 1907 - Lady Rylstone
- 1906 - Collarit
- 1905 - Charles Stuart
- 1904 - Lord Fitzroy
- 1903 - Kilfera
- 1902 - Brakpan
- 1901 - Ibex
- 1900 - Haulette
- 1899 - Reviver
- 1898 - Bobadil
- 1897 - Aurum
- 1896 - Coil
- 1895 - Bob Ray
- 1894 - Acmena
- 1893 - Carnage
- 1892 - Autonomy
- 1891 - Oxide
- 1890 - Wilga
- 1889 - Rudolph
- 1888 - Volley
- 1887 - Matador
- 1886 - Blairgowrie
- 1885 - Uralla
- 1884 - Bargo
- 1883 - Warwick
- 1882 - Navigator
- 1881 - Spinningdale
- 1880 - Grand Prix
- 1879 - Baronet
- 1878 - His Lordship
- 1877 - Chester
- 1876 - Robinson Crusoe
- 1875 - Hyperion
- 1874 - Kingsborough
- 1873 - Rose D'Amour
- 1872 - Lecturer
- 1871 - Hamlet
- 1870 - Florence
- 1869 - Lamplighter
- 1868 - Fenella
- 1867 - Fireworks
- 1866 - Fishhook
- 1865 - The Pitsford
- 1864 - Yattendon
- 1863 - Mavourneen
- 1862 - The Jade
- 1861 - Exeter

== See also ==
- All Aged Stakes
- Frank Packer Plate
- Hall Mark Stakes
- James H B Carr Stakes
- Japan Racing Association Plate
- List of Australian Group races
- Group races
