= James H B Carr Stakes =

- Class: Group 3
- Location: Randwick Racecourse; Sydney, Australia
- Inaugurated: 1986
- Race type: Thoroughbred – Flat racing
- Sponsor: Mostyn Copper (2020-26)

Race information
- Distance: 1,400 metres
- Surface: Turf
- Track: Right-handed
- Qualification: Three-year-old fillies
- Weight: Set weights with penalties
- Purse: $250,000 (2026)

The James H B Carr Stakes is an Australian Turf Club Group 3 Thoroughbred horse race under set weights with penalties conditions for three-year-old fillies, held over a distance of 1400 metres at Randwick Racecourse, Sydney, Australia in April.

== History ==
=== Grade ===
- 1986–2013 - Listed race
- 2014 onwards - Group 3

== Winners ==
The following are past winners of the race.

- 2026 - Snitzel Dancer
- 2025 - Lilac
- 2024 - Konasana
- 2023 - Olentia
- 2022 - Espiona
- 2021 - All Hallows' Eve
- 2020 - Rubisaki
- 2019 - Laburnum
- 2018 - Moss Trip
- 2017 - Raiment
- 2016 - Yattarna
- 2015 - Slightly Sweet
- 2014 - Estonian Princess
- 2013 - Missy Cummings
- 2012 - Angel Of Mercy
- 2011 - Red Tracer
- 2010 - Happy Hippy
- 2009 - Silently
- 2008 - Nediyms Dream
- 2007 - Stellamac
- 2006 - Pasikatera
- 2005 - Happier
- 2004 - Royal Mask
- 2003 - Private Steer
- 2002 - Trail Of Gold
- 2001 - Secret Liaisons
- 2000 - Poppett
- 1999 - Wynciti
- 1998 - Flickering Fire
- 1997 - Prairie
- 1996 - Seika
- 1995 - Georgia Belle
- 1994 - Hot To Race
- 1993 - Flitter
- 1992 - Ride The Rapids
- 1991 - Quiet Queen
- 1990 - Miss Uvana
- 1989 - Galspray
- 1988 - Lanyard
- 1987 - †Fiorit / Rainbow High
- 1986 - Signal To Noise

† Dead heat

== See also ==
- All Aged Stakes
- Champagne Stakes (ATC)
- Frank Packer Plate
- Hall Mark Stakes
- Japan Racing Association Plate
- List of Australian Group races
- Group races
