= Auckland Futurity Stakes =

Horse race in New Zealand

Great Northern Foal Stakes was a major race for 2 year-old horses run over 1400m at Ellerslie Racecourse, New Zealand.

From 2018 the race became known as the Auckland Futurity Stakes.

Up to 1998 it was run in late January and was a group 3 race, then it become a listed race. From 1999 to 2002 it was raced in late March or April before moving to late May in 2003. The last edition of the race was held in May 2023.

Past winners include:

- Desert Gold, who won the race in 1914.
- McGinty, the 1982 winner who also took out the 1983 Caulfield Stakes and 1984 Rawson Stakes.
- La Bella Dama, the 2000 winner, who went on to win the 2000 Eight Carat Classic and in 2001 the Royal Stakes and King's Plate at Ellerslie, the Tesio Stakes at Moonee Valley and the LKS Mackinnon Stakes.

== Winners ==
The following are some past results.

Year	Stake	Winner	Sire	Dam	Jockey	Trainer(s)	2nd place	3rd place
2023 (May)	$80,000	Saltcoats 57	Ardrissan (Aus)	Savanite	Kozzi Asano	Samantha Logan	Paragon 57	Chantilly Lace 55
2022 (May)	$70,000	Leedox 57	Time Test	Bella Carolina	Ryan Elliott	Andrew Forsman	Contagious 55	Timeless 55
2021 (May)	$50,000	Atullibigeal 56.5	Street Boss	Kellys Ocean Jewel	Andrew Calder	Carl Henderson	Lady Maroal 54.5	There You Go 54.5
2019 (May)	$50,000	Rhaegar 56.5	Pluck	Grand Lady	Michael McNab	Murray Baker & Andrew Forsman	Long Jack 56.5	Jennifer Eccles 54.5
2018 (June)	$50,000	Peaceful 54.5	Savabeel	Paloma	Matt Cameron	Murray Baker & Andrew Forsman	Cyber Attack 56.5	Sol Invictus 56.5
2017 (May)	$50,000	Haussmann	Pour Moi	Lily L’Amour	Vinnie Colgan	Tony Pike	So Far Sokool	Ohceedee
2016 (May)	$50,000	Ichiban 56.5	Swiss Ace (AUS)	Eclaircissement	Leith Innes	Graeme & Debbie Rogerson	Quantum	Church Road
2015 (May)	$50,000	Secret Spirit 54.5	Swiss Ace (AUS)	Spirit of Sandford	Danielle Johnson	Lance O'Sullivan & Andrew Scott	Get That Jive	Ragnaar
2014 (May)	$50,000	Avisto 54.5	Tavistock	Miraculous Miss	Noel Harris	John Sargent & Hayden Allen	Midnight Magicman	Martiniz Special
2013 (May)	$50,000	Hera	O'Reilly	Corsica	Matt Cameron	Roger James	Devour	Lushoto
2012 (May)	$50,000	Misstrum	Stratum (AUS)	Malagra Miss (AUS)	Leith Innes	Roger James	About Square	Twilight Granita
2011 (May)	$45,000	Whoshe	Storm Creek (USA)	Lesley Coup	Mark Sweeney	Richard and Chris Otto	A Cool Change	Dollario
2010 (May)	$45,000	Smoulder	Traditionally (USA)	Flying Firebird	Chad Ormsby	Graeme and Mark Sanders	We Can Say It Now	Shamabelle
2009 (May)	$50,000	Flying Fulton	Flying Spur (AUS)	Fulton (NZ)	Vinnie Colgan	Mark Walker	Bally Duff	Justanexcuse
2008 (May)	$55,000	St Culpe	Rock of Gibraltar (Ire)	Run And Hide (USA)	Leith Innes	Mike & Paul Moroney	Bright Spark	Lucy's Sister
2007 (May)	$50,000	Russian Conquest	St. Petersburg (AUS)	Woodminco (AUS)	Cameron Lammas	Graeme Rogerson & Stephen Autridge	Yau	Tief
2006 (May)	$35,000	Bianca	Painted Black	Blanche Amelia (by Grosvenor)	Gary Grylls	Don Dwyer	Veloce Bella	Habana
2005 (May)	$35,000	Twinkling	Star Way (GB)	Limitless	Regan Norvall		Captain Kurt	Missy Elliott
2004 (May)		Sheka	Sandtrap (USA)	Lynsu	Mark Du Plessis		Royal Babe	Savute
2003 (May)		Hulachine	Tale of the Cat (USA)	Its Hula Time	Lance O'Sullivan		Our Kashani	Seigla Bay
2002 (March)		Danceinthesun	Desert Sun (GB)	Miss Tripper	Gary Grylls		Class Success	Savuka
2001 (April)		Flying Babe	Flying Spur (AUS)	Cast Your Fate (AUS)	Lance O'Sullivan		Finishing School	Sorrento Star
2000 (April)		La Bella Dama	Desert Sun (GB)	Who's That Lady	Gary Grylls		The Almighty One	Real Flyer
1999 (April)		Brocco Babe	Brocco (USA)	Nuryandra (GB)	Gary Grylls		Marasie	Pourquoi
1997 (Jan)		Good Faith 54	Straight Strike (USA)	Head Of The River (GB)	Catherine Treymane	Donna Logan, Ruakaka	Rain Squall 54	Love De Tor 54
1985	$15,000	Travel Light	Bellissimo	Otalight	Warwick Robinson	R C Lang, Cambridge	Hopscotch	Prince Tai
1984	$15,000	Natural	Otehi Bay	Nephele	David A Peake	Trevor McKee, Takanini	Shumanshu	Black Eclipse
1982	$10,000	McGinty	One Pound Sterling	Ernader	Robert Vance	Colin Jillings, Takanini	Andretti	Long Range
1981	$10,000	Magnificent	Taipan II	Some Swallow (by My Swallow)	Bruce Compton	W J Bromby, Cambridge	Spokekane	Divine Ruler
1980	$10,000	Yir Tiz	Bismark II	Dreamy Jeannie (by Gold Sovereign)	Warwick Robinson	Graeme Rogerson, Te Rapa	Summer Haze	Proud Avon
1979	$6,000	Judena	Zephyr Bay	Loma Loma (by Calm Courage)	Bill Skelton	P Hollingshead, Te Awamutu	Young Shaun	Delma Jay
1978 (Jan)	$6,000	Bidum Bidum	Master John	Arragon's Comet (by Arragon)	Bill Skelton	R B & W B Priscott, Te Awamutu	Thunder Queen	Bally Trail
1977 (Jan)	$6,000							
1976 (Jan)	$6,000	Ballybrit	Wandering Eyes	Banba (by Resurgent)	J Riordan	G K & W Sanders, Te Awamutu	Secret Show	Princess Amarula

There was no edition of the race in 2020 due to COVID-19 restrictions.

== See also ==
Thoroughbred racing in New Zealand
