= Desert Gold (horse) =

New Zealand-bred Thoroughbred racehorse

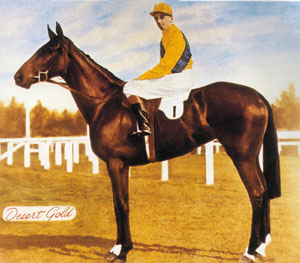
- Sire: All Black (GB)
- Grandsire: Gallinule
- Dam: Aurarius (AUS)
- Damsire: Maltster
- Sex: Mare
- Foaled: 1912
- Country: New Zealand
- Colour: Bay
- Breeder: Okawa Stud
- Owner: T. H. Lowry
- Trainer: Fred Davis
- Record: 59: 36-13-4
- Earnings: £23,239

Major wins
- Great Northern Foal Stakes (1914); Royal Stakes (1915, 1916); Islington Plate (1915, 1916, 1917); Hawke's Bay Guineas (1915); New Zealand 1000 Guineas (1915); Manawatu Sires Produce Stakes (1915); Great Northern St. Leger (1916); Awapuni Gold Cup (1916, 1917, 1918); CJC New Zealand Derby Stakes (1915); Great Northern Derby (1916); New Zealand Oaks (1916); Wellington Stakes (1916); VATC St George Stakes (1918); AJC All-Aged Stakes (1918); Taranaki Stakes (1919)

Honours
- New Zealand Racing Hall of Fame; Desert Gold Stakes at Trentham Racecourse
- Last updated on 29 March 2007

Desert Gold was a famous and successful New Zealand Thoroughbred racehorse who raced at the time of World War I. She raced in Australia and New Zealand, winning 36 races, including 19 in succession.

== Racing record ==
She was owned by T. H. Lowry and trained by Fred Davis for whom she won many good races.

=== At two years: 1914-1915 ===
In 1914, she won the Great Northern Foal Stakes and Royal Stakes, the Manawatu Sires Produce Stakes (in race record time) and the North Island Challenge Stakes.

=== At three years: 1915-1916 ===
Desert Gold had 14 starts and won all of them, five of them in race record time. These races included the Hawke's Bay Guineas, New Zealand Derby (taking three seconds off the record), CJC New Zealand Oaks, CJC G.G. Stead Memorial Gold Cup, Islington Plate, ARC Great Northern Derby, Royal Stakes (for the second time and in race record time), Wellington Stakes (in race record time), WRC North Island Challenge Stakes, Awapuni Gold Cup, Manawatu Sires Produce Stakes, ARC Great Northern Oaks and ARC Great Northern St. Leger Stakes.

=== At four years: 1916-1917 ===
As four-year-old Desert Gold had seven starts and won five of them and was second and third in the other two races. Her wins included the WRC Champion Plate, Islington Plate (for the second time), Wellington Stakes, WRC North Island Challenge Stakes and Awapuni Gold Cup.

=== At five years: 1917-1918 ===
Desert Gold had 13 starts as five-year-old and won nine of them, and was second in two and third in the other two races. Her wins included the WRC Champion Plate, CJC G.G. Stead Memorial Stakes, 1917 Islington Plate (for the third time), VATC St George Stakes, VRC Governor's Plate, AJC Autumn Stakes, AJC All-Aged Stakes (1918) and Awapuni Gold Cup (for the second time).

=== At six years: 1918-1919 ===
As six-year-old Desert Gold had 10 race starts for 2 wins and 5 seconds. She was allotted a handicap weight of 9 stone 6 pounds in the Melbourne Cup but was unplaced to the winner, Night Watch, who carried 6 stone 9 pounds. Her only principal win was when she defeated the three-year-old colt, Gloaming in the 1919 Taranaki Stakes. She also finished second in the Awapuni Gold Cup.

=== At seven years: 1919-1920 ===
In her final season of racing, Desert Gold had three starts for a third in the G.G. Stead Memorial Stakes which was won by Gloaming.

Desert Gold retired with a record of 59 Starts: 36-13-4 and earnings of £23,239.

== Stud record ==
Desert Gold was a successful broodmare that produced a total of nine foals, of which six raced and three were winners. Her named produce are:

- 1921 filly, Desert Land by Finland (AUS)
- 1922 filly, Oreum by King John (IRE), dam of the brilliant Gold Rod, won 14 stakes races including AJC Epsom Handicap and AJC Doncaster Handicap
- 1924 filly, Auratum by Absurd (GB)
- 1925 filly, Pure Gold by Psychology (GB), dam of Gold Trail (won Auckland Cup etc.).
- 1927 stallion, Chrysology (by Psychology), won Timaru Cup
- 1928 filly, Sahara by Grandcourt (GB), dam of stakes winner, Karachi and others
- 1930 filly, Fintry by Chief Ruler (GB)
- 1932 filly, Treasure Trove by Gainscourt (GB)

Her family has continued to produce many winners.

== Honours ==
Several races have been named after her in New Zealand, including the time-honoured $100,000 Group III Desert Gold Stakes (1,600 m) at Trentham Racecourse.

== Popular culture ==
Desert Gold appeared in a feature film from Beaumont Smith called Desert Gold (1919).

== See also ==
- Thoroughbred racing in New Zealand
- List of racehorses
- List of leading Thoroughbred racehorses
- Repeat winners of horse races
