= Desert Gold (1919 Australian film) =

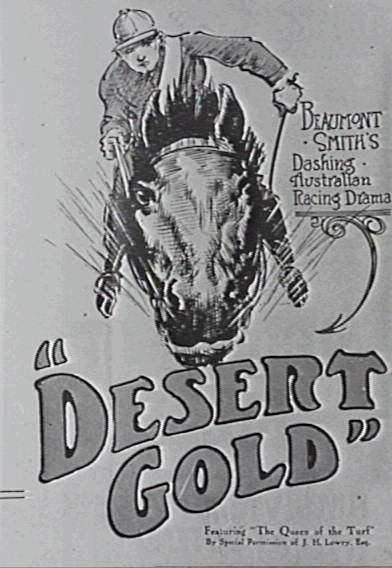
- Directed by: Beaumont Smith
- Written by: Beaumont Smith
- Produced by: Beaumont Smith; E. J. Carroll
- Starring: Marie Ney
- Cinematography: Lacey Percival
- Production company: Beaumont Smith's Productions
- Distributed by: E. J. Carroll; Union Theatres
- Release date: 24 March 1919
- Running time: 6 reels
- Country: Australia
- Language: Silent

Desert Gold is a 1919 Australian horse racing melodrama from director Beaumont Smith starring the racehorse Desert Gold. It is considered to be a lost film.

== Plot ==
John Forsythe and his trusty horse Desert Gold wander through the Australian outback, where Forsythe discovers a deposit of gold. A villain, Harrington, tries to steal Forsythe's claim, but is unsuccessful.

Years later, Forsythe owns substantial horse racing interests, which are run by trainer, Anderson, who has a daughter, Joan (Marie Ney). Forsythe has a new champion race horse, also known as Desert Gold (played by the real-life Desert Gold). Harrington knows his horse, Slippery Jane, has no chance against Desert Gold, so he plays Anderson at cards and gets him into debt. Joan discovers a wire across the training track set by Harrington's accomplices and manages to stop them hurting Desert Gold.

Harrington threatens to bankrupt Anderson so Joan offers to marry him. Forsythe ends up paying the debt and Joan is aged after a race between a motor car and a train to Katoomba. Harrington then lures Fortyhe to a lonely spot in the Blue Mountains and imprisons him, then sends a telegram in Forysthe's name scratching Desert Gold from the Cup and backs Slippery Jane. Forysthe manages to escape and flies to the city in time for the race. Desert Gold beats Slippery Jane, despite Harrington ordering an electric whip be used on his horse.

The film also features fights on horseback in the desert and on the brink of Leura Falls in the Blue Mountains, the blowing up of a ship at sea, and a flight of an aeroplane.

== Cast ==
- Marie Ney as Joan
- John Cosgrove
- Bryce Rowe
- Gilbert Emery
- Desert Gold as herself

== Production ==
The film was shot in and around Sydney and at the air force base at Richmond, with desert scenes shot at Botany Bay. Desert Gold was a famous racehorse from the time and several leading jockeys have cameos. It was the film debut of actor Marie Ney who went on to have a significant career in Australian and England.

== Release ==
The film's release was delayed due to the 1918 flu pandemic.

Variety said the film "was very crude in plot and acting and would be quite unsuitable for the American market."

Copies of the film were destroyed in a fire in 1925.

== See also ==
- List of films about horses
- List of films about horse racing
