= Taranaki Stakes =

Taranaki Stakes was a horse race for thoroughbred racehorses held in New Zealand. The first race was held in 1915 at the Taranaki Jockey Club's August meeting.

Notable winners of the race include:

- Desert Gold in 1919
- Gloaming in 1921 and 1922
- Mainbrace
- The Hawk in 1927 and 1928.
