= Prince Foote =

Australian Thoroughbred racehorse

- Sire: Sir Foote (GB)
- Grandsire: Sir Hugo (GB)
- Dam: Petruschka (GB)
- Damsire: Isinglass (GB)
- Sex: Stallion
- Foaled: 1906
- Died: 1922
- Country: Australia
- Colour: Bay
- Breeder: John Brown
- Owner: John Brown
- Trainer: Frank McGrath Snr
- Record: 22: 11,4,1
- Earnings: £16,520

Major wins
- AJC Sires Produce Stakes (1909); AJC Derby (1909); VRC Derby (1909); Melbourne Cup (1909); Chelmsford Stakes (1909, 1910); VRC St Leger (1910); AJC St Leger (1910); VRC Champion Stakes (1910); AJC Cumberland Stakes (1910); AJC Plate (1910)

Prince Foote (1906–1922) was an Australian Thoroughbred Stallion performing in Australia raced from a two-year-old to a five-year-old, recording 11 wins from 7 furlongs to 3 miles and trained by Australian Racing Hall of Fame inductee Frank McGrath senior.

== Breeding ==
Prince Foote by Sir Foote (GB) was bred by his owner John Brown in 1906 at his Wills Gully stud Singleton, New South Wales.

Dam Petruschka (GB) bred in England in 1899 and imported by John Brown in 1903 for stud.

== Racing career ==
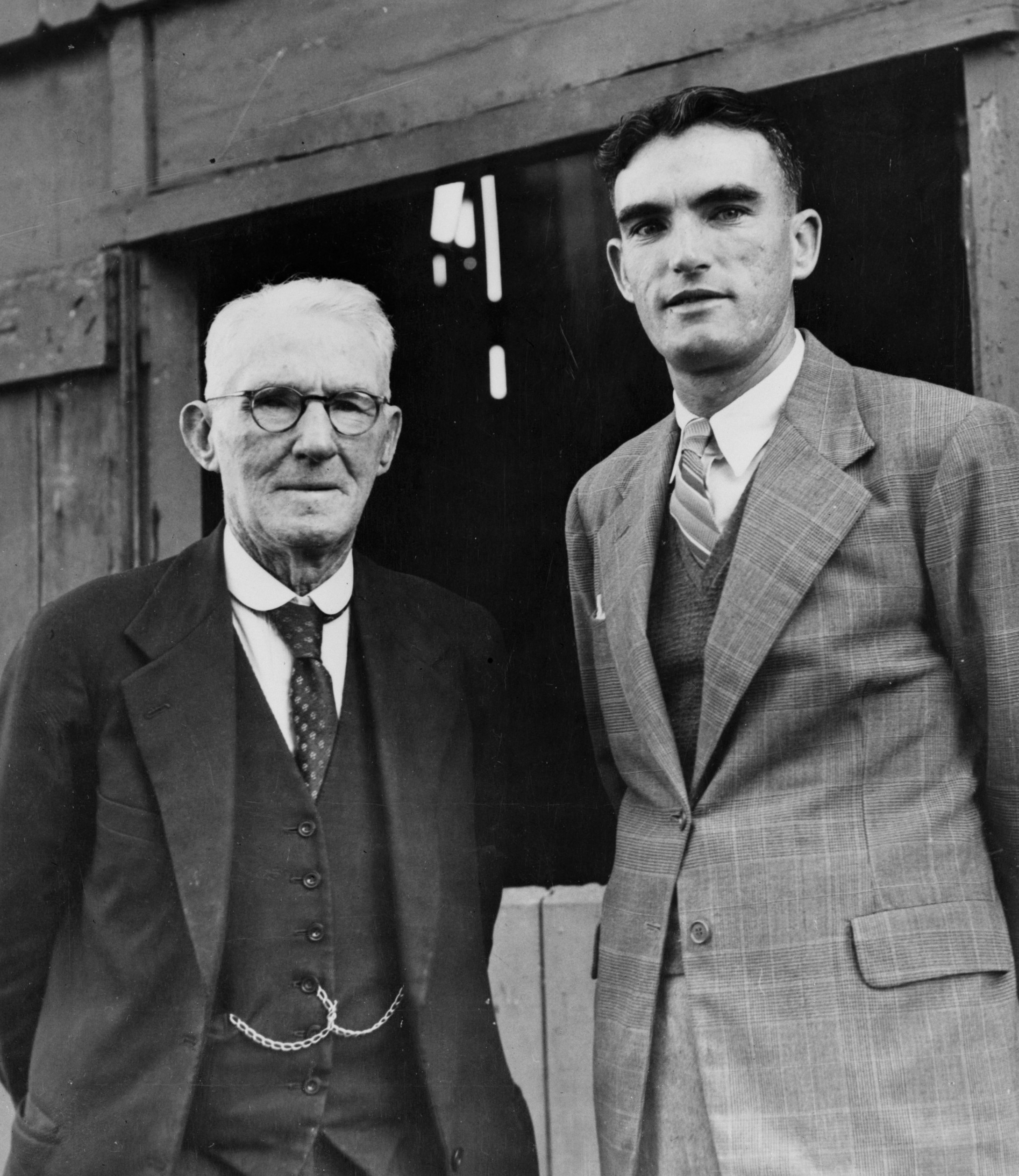
Frank McGrath Snr Frank McGrath Jnr

Prince Foote raced between 1909 -1911 and equaled the record of champion Poseidon winning the 1909 AJC Derby and VRC Derby the 1909 Melbourne Cup and 1910 AJC St Leger and VRC St Leger in the same season. Prince Foote's racing colours were Pale blue, yellow sleeves, black cap.

Owner John Brown (1850-1930) was a coal baron, ship owner and racehorse breeder was born near East Maitland, New South Wales and in 1897 begun to race horses under 'J.Baron' and won the 1897 AJC Doncaster Handicap with Superb, Sir Foote 1902 AJC Doncaster Handicap, VATC Futurity Stakes, VRC Newmarket Handicap and the outstanding Duke Foote winning the 1912 VRC Melbourne Stakes, 1912 & 1913 AJC Craven Plate and 1912 & 1913 Chelmsford Stakes and Balloon King 1930 VRC Derby.

Trainer Frank McGrath senior (1865-1947) a career in racing of over 65 years winning 121 feature races and in the early 1900s trained Abundance 1902 AJC Derby and VRC Derby also 1903 AJC St Leger and VRC St Leger followed by the champions Amounis, Peter Pan, Beau Vite and the outstanding Irish import Denis Boy 1931 VATC Caulfield Cup and 1932 AJC Metropolitan Handicap and 1932 VRC Cantala Stakes and on retirement handed his stable to his son Frank McGrath Jnr who had major success with Russia 1947 AJC Colin Stephen Stakes, 1947 AJC Craven Plate and 1948 AJC Plate and On Line 1959 Sydney Cup.

Prince Foote's racing record: 22 starts for 11 wins, 4 seconds, 1 third

== Stud career ==
Prince Foote sired the classic winners Prince Viridis 1918 AJC and VRC St Leger, Richmond Main 1919 AJC Derby and VRC Derby and Prince Charles 1922 AJC Sydney Cup.

Prince Foote died in 1922, aged 16, of a ruptured blood vessel at his owners Wills Gully Stud.
