= Sailor's Guide =

Australian-bred Thoroughbred racehorse

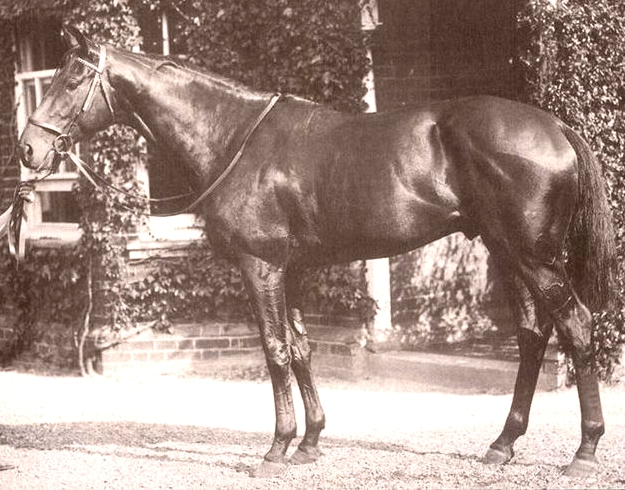
- Pharos the grandsire of Sailor's Guide.
- Sire: Lighthouse II (FR)
- Grandsire: Pharos
- Dam: Jehane (GB)
- Damsire: Legend of France (FR)
- Sex: Stallion
- Foaled: 1952
- Country: Australia
- Colour: Brown
- Record: 70: 23-17-8. Australia 58: 18-13-8; USA 10: 4-4-0; Canada 2: 1-0-0
- Earnings: £66,494 plus US$116,586

Major wins
- VRC Derby (1955); VRC St Leger Stakes (1956); Sydney Cup (1956); VRC Queen Elizabeth Stakes (1956, 1958); C.B.Fisher Plate (1956); AJC St Leger (1956); Craiglee Stakes (1956, 1957); Sandown Classic (1957); LKS MacKinnon Stakes (1957); Blamey Stakes (1957, 1958); P J O'Shea Stakes (1958); Washington, D.C. International Stakes (1958); Jockey Club Cup Handicap (1959)

Honours
- Australian Racing Hall of Fame
- Last updated on 17 May 2021

Sailor's Guide was an outstanding Thoroughbred racehorse that was conceived in England and foaled in Australia. He is notable in that he won races in the United States, Canada, and a number of principal Australian races, and was a high stakes earner.

He was a brown stallion that was foaled in 1952 at Sledmere Stud Scone and was sired by the good racehorse Lighthouse II. His dam was the imported mare Jehane (GB) by Legend of France (FR) imported by Maurice Point owner of Sledmere Stud. Jehane was also the dam of several other winners including Far Away Places (by Royal Empire) who won the SAJC Adelaide Cup.

In 2021 he was inducted into the Australian Racing Hall of Fame.

== Racing career ==
Many of Sailor's Guide’s wins were by margins of a neck or less and in the Sydney Cup his winning margin was a half head. In the Pentathlon Stakes (a VATC Olympic Games commemorative event) Sailor's Guide showed his class by defeating the New Zealand (NZ) horse, Rising Fast and then another NZ horse in Redcraze in the C B Fisher Plate. During the spring Sailor's Guide again won the Craiglee Stakes, was third in the Caulfield Cup and won the LKS MacKinnon Stakes.

He won many other major races in Australia in the late 1950s, including the VRC Queen Elizabeth Stakes (defeating Prince Darius and Tulloch) and the VRC Derby. and was one of the highest stake winners of the period. He also won the Sky Classic Stakes in Toronto, Ontario, Canada.

He ended up winning more than £100,000, with Tulloch and the Standardbred harness horse Caduceus as the only horses bred in Australia or New Zealand to have achieved this distinction at that time. Tulloch was his main rival, and they defeated each other on a number of occasions.

The most important race he won was the 1958 Washington, D.C. International (now replaced by the Breeders' Cup Turf), a major horse race in the United States. It was contested on turf over 1½ miles (2,400 metres) and drew the best horses from North America and Europe. In winning the race, Sailor's Guide defeated the top performer Ballymoss who had a Timeform rating of 136. Soon after, Ballymoss won the Prix de l'Arc de Triomphe and was also voted as 1958 European Horse of the Year.

Sailor's Guide was retired to stud in America, but was a poor foal-getter. He did have eight of his progeny race without any great success.
