= Tulloch (horse) =

New Zealand-bred Thoroughbred racehorse

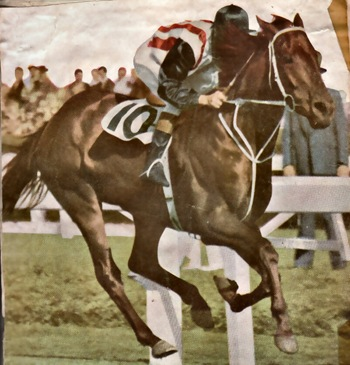
- Sire: Khorassan
- Grandsire: Big Game
- Dam: Florida
- Damsire: Salmagundi
- Sex: Stallion
- Foaled: 1954
- Country: New Zealand
- Colour: Bay or brown
- Breeder: Trelawney Stud
- Owner: E.A. Haley
- Trainer: Tommy J. Smith
- Record: 53:36-12-4
- Earnings: £110,121

Major wins
- VRC St Leger (1958); AJC St Leger (1958); P.J. O'Shea Stakes (1960, 1961); Queen Elizabeth Stakes (1958, 1960, 1961); C B Fisher Plate (1957, 1960); Chipping Norton Stakes (1958, 1960); Brisbane Cup (1961); W S Cox Plate (1960); Mackinnon Stakes (1960); Chelmsford Stakes (1960); Craven Plate (1960); All Aged Stakes (1958); Rawson Stakes (1958); Caulfield Cup (1957); Caulfield Guineas (1957); Warwick Stakes (1957); VRC Derby (1957); AJC Derby (1957); QTC Derby (1957); Rosehill Guineas (1957); AJC Sires Produce Stakes (1957); VRC Sires Produce Stakes (1957); QTC Sires Produce Stakes (1957)

Honours
- Australian Racing Hall of Fame; New Zealand Racing Hall of Fame; Tulloch Stakes
- Last updated on 11 May 2009

Tulloch (foaled in New Zealand in 1954 and died in 1969) was a champion Australian Thoroughbred racehorse who was one of the greatest Australian stayers.

He won at distances from 5 furlongs (1,000 metres) to 2 miles (3,200 m), established Australian records at 10 furlongs (1960 Cox Plate) and 12 furlongs (1957 Caulfield Cup), and took 2 seconds off Phar Lap's 28-year-old record for the AJC Derby. As a three-year-old Tulloch won 14 of his 16 starts before he was struck down by a virus which kept him off the racing scene for almost two years. He returned to racing as an autumn five-year-old and won 15 of his last 24 races.

Tulloch was one of the five inaugural horse inductees into the Australian Racing Hall of Fame, alongside Carbine, Phar Lap, Bernborough and Kingston Town. Tulloch is also an inductee in the New Zealand Racing Hall of Fame.

== Background ==
Tulloch was a bay or brown colt foaled in 1954 at Trelawney Stud, Cambridge, New Zealand. He was by the good racehorse and sire, Khorassan out of the race winner, Florida by Salmagundi (GB). Khorassan (IRE) was the sire of 18 stakeswinners with 65 stakeswins, mostly in New Zealand. Florida was also the dam of Tallahassee Lassie (unraced) and Tulloch's Sister (a multiple metropolitan race winner), before she was exported to the US.

== Racing career ==
Trainer Tommy J. Smith bought Tulloch as a yearling for 750 guineas in 1956 at the Trentham Yearling Sales. He offered the colt to E.A. Haley who was impressed by the horse's breeding, intelligence and presence despite having what was referred to as a "swampy" back. Haley named him Tulloch after the Scottish town where his mother was born.

=== 1956/1957: Two-Year-Old Season ===
Tulloch made his debut in the Breeders' Plate in the spring of 1956 where he was the favourite but was defeated by Flying Kurana. A week later, Tulloch won the Canonbury Stakes.

He was then sent to Melbourne where he raced three times, winning twice but was defeated in the Maribyrnong Plate by Concert Star.

Resuming in the autumn, Tulloch was placed second in his first two starts, a 2yo handicap in Sydney and the Merson Cooper Stakes.

He then won the seven furlong VRC Sires Produce Stakes, defeating Ace High. In his next start, dropping back a furlong, Ace High turned the tables on Tulloch in the Ascot Vale Stakes.

Returning to Sydney, Tulloch won the Fairfield Handicap at Warwick Farm Racecourse before meeting only two other horses in the AJC Sires Produce Stakes. Todman and Prince Darius were to prove themselves as worthy foes, however were no match for Tulloch, who at this stage was undefeated at seven furlongs. Todman turned the tables in the Champagne Stakes (dropping back to 6F) beating Tulloch by six lengths. Before heading for a spell, Smith and Tulloch travelled to Brisbane where Tulloch won the QTC Sires Produce Stakes.

His record at the end of his 2yo season stood at 13:7-6-0. Tulloch had won the VRC, AJC and QTC Sires Produce Stakes, the Cannonbury Stakes as well as 2yo races at Caulfield, Flemington and Warwick Farm Racecourse. He also ran second in the Maribyrnong Plate, AJC Breeders Plate, Ascot Vale Stakes and the Champagne Stakes.

=== 1957/1958: Three-Year-Old Season ===
Resuming in the Warwick Stakes in 1957, Tulloch took on open age competition for the first time beating MacDougal (winner of the Metropolitan Handicap and Melbourne Cup), Monte Carlo (AJC Derby and VRC Derby and LKS Mackinnon Stakes) and Caranna (AJC Derby, Caulfield Guineas and Rosehill Guineas). Next he went back to his own age group in the Rosehill Guineas, where he beat Prince Darius, then onto the AJC Derby, in which Tulloch beat Prince Darius (again) by six lengths and in the process broke the track record by 2.1 seconds that had been held by Phar Lap since 1929. Tulloch then made the trip down to Melbourne to win the Caulfield Guineas and then took on the older horses again in the Caulfield Cup. Tulloch started 6/4 favourite in a field of 17, carrying 7 stone 8 pounds (approx 48 kg). Tulloch won in 2:26.9, which at the time was the fastest time in the world for a mile and a half on turf and the third fastest overall. He won by two lengths from Mac's Amber (Chipping Norton Stakes and Toorak Handicap) and Sailor's Guide (AJC Derby, LKS Mackinnon Stakes as well as the Washington, D.C. International in the USA). Tulloch's Caulfield Cup time of 2:26.9 for a mile and a half (2414 meters) stood for 43 years until in 2000 when Diatribe ran 2:25.32 for 2400 meters lowering Tulloch's time by .73 (73/100) of a second, however, no 3-year-old horse in recorded history has ever covered one and one half miles on turf carrying that weight faster than Tulloch.

Tulloch was installed as favourite for the Melbourne Cup - it was rumoured that Smith had a wager of £33,000 to £1,000 that Tulloch would win the Cups double. A Sydney newspaper ran a story on the Monday after the Caulfield Cup that quoted the owner EA Haley as saying that Tulloch would never run in the Melbourne Cup as he did not fancy running 3yos over two miles, especially with the 8 stone 5 pounds (53 kg) burden he had been allotted. The rest of the newspapers were full of Tommy Smith predicting how far Tulloch would win the Cup by and the debate raged leading up to the race if the great horse would run or not. Whilst the controversy ensured an exciting lead up to the Cup, Tulloch won the VRC Derby, beating Prince Darius by eight lengths.

Scratched from the Melbourne Cup, punters were left to wonder what might have been, as Straight Draw downed Prince Darius by a neck with Pandie Sun a further 2½ lengths further back in third. The weight for age (w.f.a.) CB Fisher Plate was next on the agenda with Tulloch easily accounting for Sailors Guide, before he was taken seven days later to Brisbane for the QTC Derby, which he won by seven lengths.

Returning in the autumn, Prince Darius defeated Tulloch in the St George Stakes over nine furlongs, Prince Darius again beat Tulloch in the VRC Queen Elizabeth Stakes over 12F, but the winner was another old adversary, Sailors Guide. Third up Tulloch won the VRC St Leger, before heading to Sydney to win the Rawson Stakes, Chipping Norton Stakes, AJC St Leger, All Aged Stakes and the AJC Queen Elizabeth Stakes.

Tulloch had 16 starts for 14 wins, one second and one third as a three-year-old. His lifetime record now stood at 29: 21-7-1. His fame had spread and Haley refused massive overseas offers for his horse. Grand plans were formulated to campaign Tulloch in the United States and England, but in April 1958, Tulloch developed a mysterious stomach disease that almost killed him. Over the next two years Tulloch suffered recurring infections and severe weight loss.

=== 1959/1960: Five-Year-Old Season ===
Remarkably, Tulloch returned to the track on 12 March 1960 - almost two years after he first became sick. First up in the VRC Queens Plate over 10 Furlongs, Tulloch defeated Lord, (who won the Caulfield Stakes (thrice), Memsie Stakes (4 times), St George Stakes (twice), C F Orr Stakes (twice), Underwood Stakes (twice)), by a short head. Tulloch then won the Chipping Norton Stakes, Craven Plate and the P.J. O'Shea Stakes to finish off a successful autumn return.

The 1960 Melbourne Cup was the aim in the spring, and in his lead up Tulloch won the Cox Plate, LKS Mackinnon Stakes and VRC Queens Plate. Under 10 stone 1 pound (approx 64 kg) in the Melbourne Cup and starting 3/1 favourite, Tulloch finished an unlucky seventh, the race being won by Hi Jinx. This was to be Tulloch's only unplaced run in his career and also one of the worst rides by top jockey Neville Sellwood who had Tulloch positioned 60 lengths behind the leader with six furlongs (1200 metres) to go and left his run too late. After the Cup Tulloch again took out the CB Fisher Plate.

Returning for the autumn Tulloch won the AJC Autumn Stakes and the AJC Queen Elizabeth Stakes before going to Brisbane where he again won the P.J. O'Shea Stakes. His last race was the 1961 Brisbane Cup which he won by 1¾ lengths.

After returning from his debilitating illness, Tulloch had a record of 24: 15-5-3 with 1 unplaced run. Thirteen of these wins were at w.f.a. in principal (stakes) races.

At the end of his career, Tulloch had won 19 Group One races. He also twice won the no longer contested Autumn Stakes (with winners such as Ming Dynasty, Balmerino, Gunsynd, Rain Lover, Galilee, Beau Vite, Peter Pan, Nightmarch, Heroic, and Carbine), as well as the no longer contested VRC Queens Plate (winners such as Leilani, Gunsynd, Rain Lover, Galilee, Lord, Ajax, Phar Lap, Wallace, and Carbine), both of which would be categorised as Group One races by today's standard. Seven races that Tulloch won are now Group 2 races and two are Group 3. The VRC St Leger (now only a listed race) and AJC St Leger were principal (stakes) races in Tulloch's era, which indicates how impressive his record was then.

== Race Record ==
1956/1957: Two-Year-Old Season
Result	Race	Venue	Distance (fur)	Weight (st.lb)	Time	Jockey	Winner/2nd
2nd	AJC Breeders' Plate	Randwick	5	8.5	0:59.7	G. Moore	Flying Kurana 1st
Won	AJC Canonbury Stakes	Randwick	5	8.5	1:01.3	G. Moore	Prince Darius 2nd
Won	VATC Gwyn Nursery	Caulfield	5	8.10	1:02.0	A. Ward	Good Summer 2nd
2nd	VRC Maribyrnong Plate	Flemington	5	8.10	1:00.0	G. Moore	Concert Star 1st
Won	VRC Byron Moore Stakes	Flemington	5	8.5	0:58.75	A. Ward	Bomba 2nd
2nd	STC Two Year Old Hcp	Rosehill	6	9.2	1:14.6	W. Dinham	Diamond Vista 1st
2nd	VATC Merson Cooper Stakes	Caulfield	6	8.10	1:10.3	A. Ward	Cherete 1st
Won	VRC Sires Produce Stakes	Flemington	7	8.10	1:27.0	A. Ward	Ace High 2nd
2nd	VRC Ascot Vale Stakes	Flemington	6	9.1	1:12.25	A. Ward	Ace High 1st
Won	AJC Fairfield Hcp	Warwick Farm	6	9.5	1:12.4	G. Moore	Prince Darius 2nd
Won	AJC Sires Produce Stakes	Randwick	7	8.10	1:25.2	G. Moore	Todman 2nd
2nd	AJC Champagne Stakes	Randwick	6	9.6	1:10.0	G. Moore	Todman 1st
Won	QTC Sires Produce Stakes	Eagle Farm	7	8.10	1:24.4	G. Moore	Civil Jury 2nd

1957/1958: Three-Year-Old Season
Result	Race	Venue	Distance (fur)	Weight (st.lb)	Time	Jockey	Winner/2nd
Won	AJC Warwick Stakes	Warwick Farm	7	7.11	1:25.6	F. Lehmann	Prince Jambo 2nd
Won	STC Rosehill Guineas	Rosehill	10	8.5	2:06.3	G. Moore	Prince Darius 2nd
Won	AJC Derby	Randwick	12	8.10	2:29.1	G. Moore	Prince Darius 2nd
Won	VATC Caulfield Guineas	Caulfield	8	8.10	1:37.8	G. Moore	Gay Saba 2nd
Won	VATC Caulfield Cup	Caulfield	12	7.8	2:26.9	N. Sellwood	Mac's Amber 2nd
Won	VRC Derby	Flemington	12	8.10	2:33.5	G. Moore	Prince Darius 2nd
Won	VRC C B Fisher Plate	Flemington	12	7.9	2:35.25	N. Sellwood	Sailor's Guide 2nd
Won	QTC Derby Stakes	Eagle Farm	12	8.10	2:32.5	G. Moore	Mon Frere 2nd
2nd	VATC St George Stakes	Caulfield	9	8.3	1:55.3	G. Moore	Prince Darius 1st
3rd	VRC Queen Elizabeth Stakes	Flemington	13	8.2	2:42.0	G. Moore	Sailor's Guide 1st
Won	VRC St Leger Stakes	Flemington	14	8.10	3:02.0	G. Moore	Tuki 2nd
Won	STC Rawson Stakes	Rosehill	9	8.4	1:52.3	G. Moore	Caranna 2nd
Won	AJC Chipping Norton Stakes	Warwick Farm	10	8.4	2:05.8	G. Moore	Baron Boissier 2nd
Won	AJC St Leger	Randwick	14	8.10	??	G. Moore	Prince Darius 2nd
Won	AJC All Aged Stakes	Randwick	8	8.8	1:36.3	G. Moore	Grenoble 2nd
Won	AJC Queen Elizabeth Stakes	Randwick	14	8.4	3:09.7	G. Moore	Baron Boissier 2nd

- In April 1958 Tulloch contracted a stomach virus which was so severe as to bring the horse close to death. Tulloch did not race for almost two years. It was not until 12 March 1960 that Tulloch returned to racing as a five-year-old.

1959/1960: Five-Year-Old Season
Result	Race	Venue	Distance (fur)	Weight (st.lb)	Time	Jockey	Winner/2nd
Won	VRC Queens Plate	Flemington	10	9.2	2:03.5	N. Sellwood	Lord 2nd
Won	AJC Chipping Norton Stakes	Warwick Farm	10	9.2	2:04.9	N. Sellwood	Trellios 2nd
Won	AJC Queen Elizabeth Stakes	Randwick	14	9.3	2:58.2	N. Sellwood	Sir Blink 2nd
Won	AJC Autumn Stakes	Randwick	12	9.3	2:30.0	N. Sellwood	Prince Darius 2nd
Won	QTC P.J. O'Shea Stakes	Eagle Farm	10½	9.1	2:18.2	N. Sellwood	Macdougal 2nd

1960/1961: Six-Year-Old Season
Result	Race	Venue	Distance (fur)	Weight (st.lb)	Time	Jockey	Winner/2nd
Won	Tatts (NSW) Chelmsford Stakes	Randwick	9	9.4	1:49.9	N. Selwood	Second Earl 2nd
2nd	AJC Colin Stephen Stakes	Randwick	12	9.6	2:32.4	N. Sellwood	Valerius 1st
2nd	AJC George Main Stakes	Randwick	8	9.3	1:37.4	N. Sellwood	Second Earl 1st
Won	AJC Craven Plate	Randwick	10	9.4	2:05.0	N. Sellwood	Persian Lyric 2nd
Won	MVRC W S Cox Plate	Moonee Valley	10	9.4	2:01.1	N. Sellwood	Dhaulagiri 2nd
Won	VRC LKS MacKinnon Stakes	Flemington	10	9.4	2:02.25	N. Sellwood	Lord 2nd
7th	VRC Melbourne Cup	Flemington	16	10.1	3:23.75	N. Sellwood	Hi Jinx 1st
Won	VRC C B Fisher Plate	Flemington	12	9.5	2:40.0	N. Sellwood	Dhaulagiri 2nd
3rd	VATC St George Stakes	Caulfield	9	9.2	1:51.6	G. Moore	Dhaulagiri 1st
3rd	VRC Queens Plate	Flemington	10	9.2	2:03.0	G. Moore	Lord 1st
3rd	VRC Queen Elizabeth Stakes	Flemington	12	9.3	2:29.75	G. Moore	Dhaulagiri 1st
2nd	AJC Telegraph Invitation Stakes	Randwick	12	9.5	2:28.6	G. Moore	Persian Lyric 1st
Won	AJC Queen Elizabeth Stakes	Randwick	14	9.3	2:57.4	G. Moore	Nilarco 2nd
Won	AJC Autumn Stakes	Randwick	12	9.3	2:27.7	G. Moore	Nilarco 2nd
2nd	AJC Sydney Cup	Randwick	16	9.13	3:24.9	G. Moore	Sharply 1st
2nd	STC Caltex Quality Hcp	Rosehill	12	9.7	2:32.2	G. Moore	Savage 1st
Won	PARC SJ Pullman Select Stakes	Cheltenham	12	9.5	2:31.1	B. Pyers	Vice Master 2nd
Won	QTC PJ O'Shea Stakes	Eagle Farm	10½	9.1	2:15.4	G. Moore	Aladdin's Lamp 2nd
Won	QTC Brisbane Cup	Eagle Farm	16	9.12	3:22.7	G. Moore	Sharply 2nd

- Total: 53 starts: 36 wins, 12 seconds, 4 thirds, 1 unplaced.

== Stud record ==
Tulloch stood at Haley's Te Koona Stud where he did not perform up to his racetrack standard. He sired two stakes winners, in Dahma Star (1967 Christmas Cup) and Valide (1968 SA Oaks). Tulloch died at Old Gowang Stud near Coonabarabran on 30 June 1969.

== Honours ==
Tulloch was one of the five inaugural inductees into the Australian Racing Hall of Fame, and was also inducted into the New Zealand Racing Hall of Fame. In 1978 he was honoured on a postage stamp issued by Australia Post.

== Pedigree ==
Pedigree of Tulloch (NZ) (24), bay or brown stallion, 1954
Sire Khorassan (IRE) 1947	Big Game (GB); 1939	Bahram (GB); 1932	Blandford* (IRE)
Sire Khorassan (IRE) 1947	Big Game (GB); 1939	Bahram (GB); 1932	Friars Daughter (GB)
Sire Khorassan (IRE) 1947	Big Game (GB); 1939	Myrobella (IRE); 1932	Tetratema (GB)
Sire Khorassan (IRE) 1947	Big Game (GB); 1939	Myrobella (IRE); 1932	Dollabella (IRE)
Sire Khorassan (IRE) 1947	Naishapur (IRE); 1942	Nearco (ITY); 1935	Pharos* (GB)
Sire Khorassan (IRE) 1947	Naishapur (IRE); 1942	Nearco (ITY); 1935	Nogara (ITY)
Sire Khorassan (IRE) 1947	Naishapur (IRE); 1942	Udaipur (GB); 1929	Blandford* (IRE)
Sire Khorassan (IRE) 1947	Naishapur (IRE); 1942	Udaipur (GB); 1929	Uganda (FR)
Dam Florida (NZ) 1945	Salmagundi (GB); 1924	Phalaris* (GB); 1913	Polymelus* (GB)
Dam Florida (NZ) 1945	Salmagundi (GB); 1924	Phalaris* (GB); 1913	Bromus (GB)*
Dam Florida (NZ) 1945	Salmagundi (GB); 1924	Salamandra (IRE); 1913	St Frusquin (GB)
Dam Florida (NZ) 1945	Salmagundi (GB); 1924	Salamandra (IRE); 1913	Electra (GB)
Dam Florida (NZ) 1945	Island Linnet (NZ); 1929	Songbird (NZ); 1918	Kilbroney (GB)
Dam Florida (NZ) 1945	Island Linnet (NZ); 1929	Songbird (NZ); 1918	Grey Linnet (GB)
Dam Florida (NZ) 1945	Island Linnet (NZ); 1929	Unawed (NZ); 1918	Markhope (GB)
Dam Florida (NZ) 1945	Island Linnet (NZ); 1929	Unawed (NZ); 1918	Unawares (NZ)

* Tulloch is inbred 5S x 3D to the stallion Phalaris, meaning that he appears fifth generation (via Pharos) on the sire side of his pedigree, and third generation on the dam side of his pedigree.

* Tulloch is inbred 4S x 4S to the stallion Blandford, meaning that he appears fourth generation twice on the sire side of his pedigree.

== See also ==
- Thoroughbred racing in New Zealand
- List of leading Thoroughbred racehorses
- Repeat winners of horse races
