= VRC St Leger =

Horse race in Melbourne, Victoria, Australia

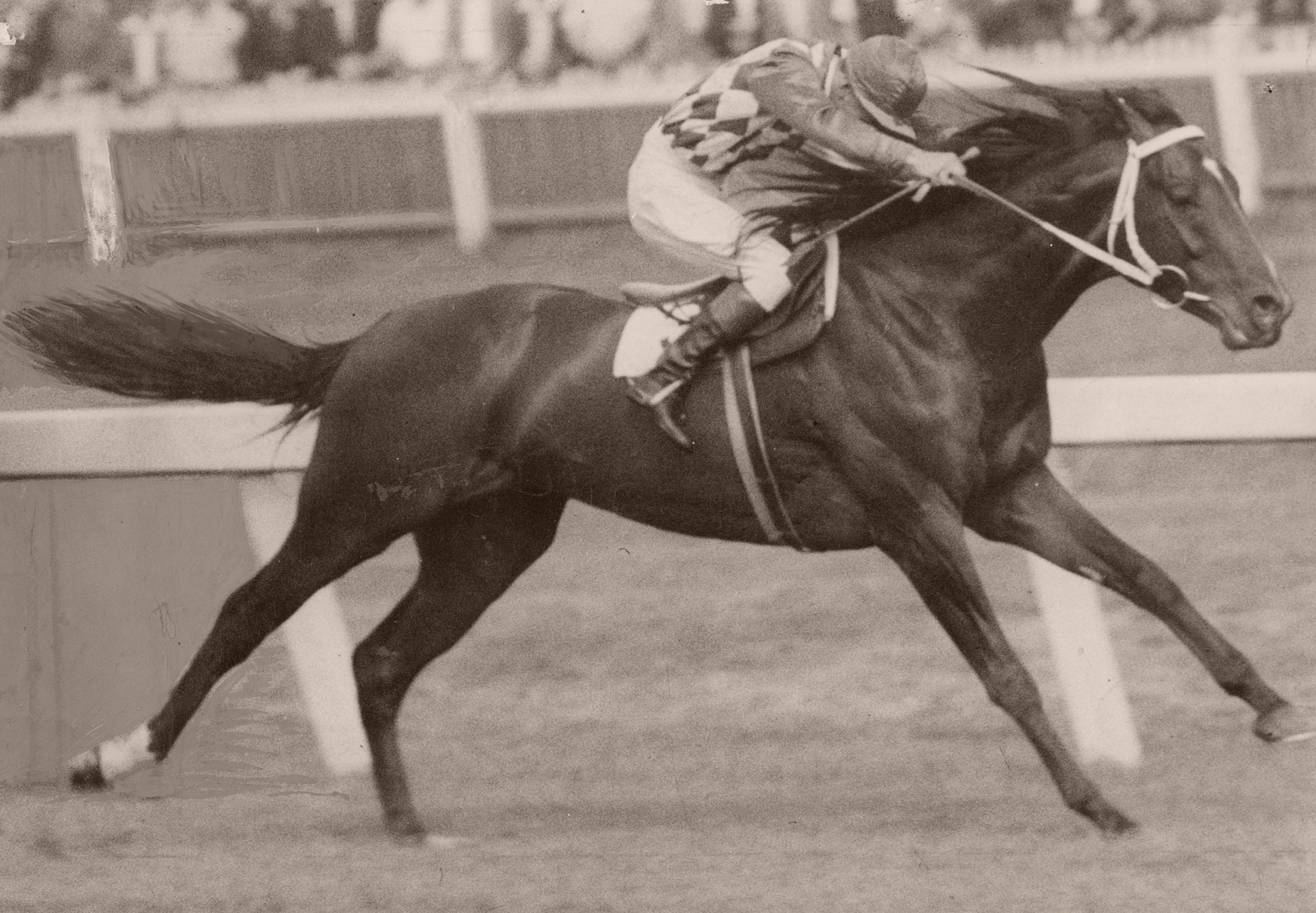
- Comic Court, 1949 winner
- Class: Listed
- Location: Flemington Racecourse; Melbourne, Australia
- Inaugurated: 1857
- Race type: Thoroughbred - Flat racing
- Website: Victoria Racing Club

Race information
- Distance: 2,800 metres
- Surface: Turf
- Track: Left-handed
- Qualification: Three-year-olds
- Weight: Set weights with penalties
- Purse: $200,000 (2026)

The VRC St Leger is a Listed Thoroughbred horse race for three-year-olds, run at set weights with penalties, over a distance of 2800 metres at Flemington Racecourse, Melbourne, Australia on ANZAC Day.

The VRC St. Leger is one of a number of similar events around the world, although many are no longer restricted to three-year-olds. European variations include the Irish St. Leger, the Prix Royal-Oak, the Deutsches St. Leger and the St. Leger Italiano. Other national equivalents include the Kikuka Shō, the New Zealand St. Leger and the English St. Leger Stakes held at Doncaster.

== History ==
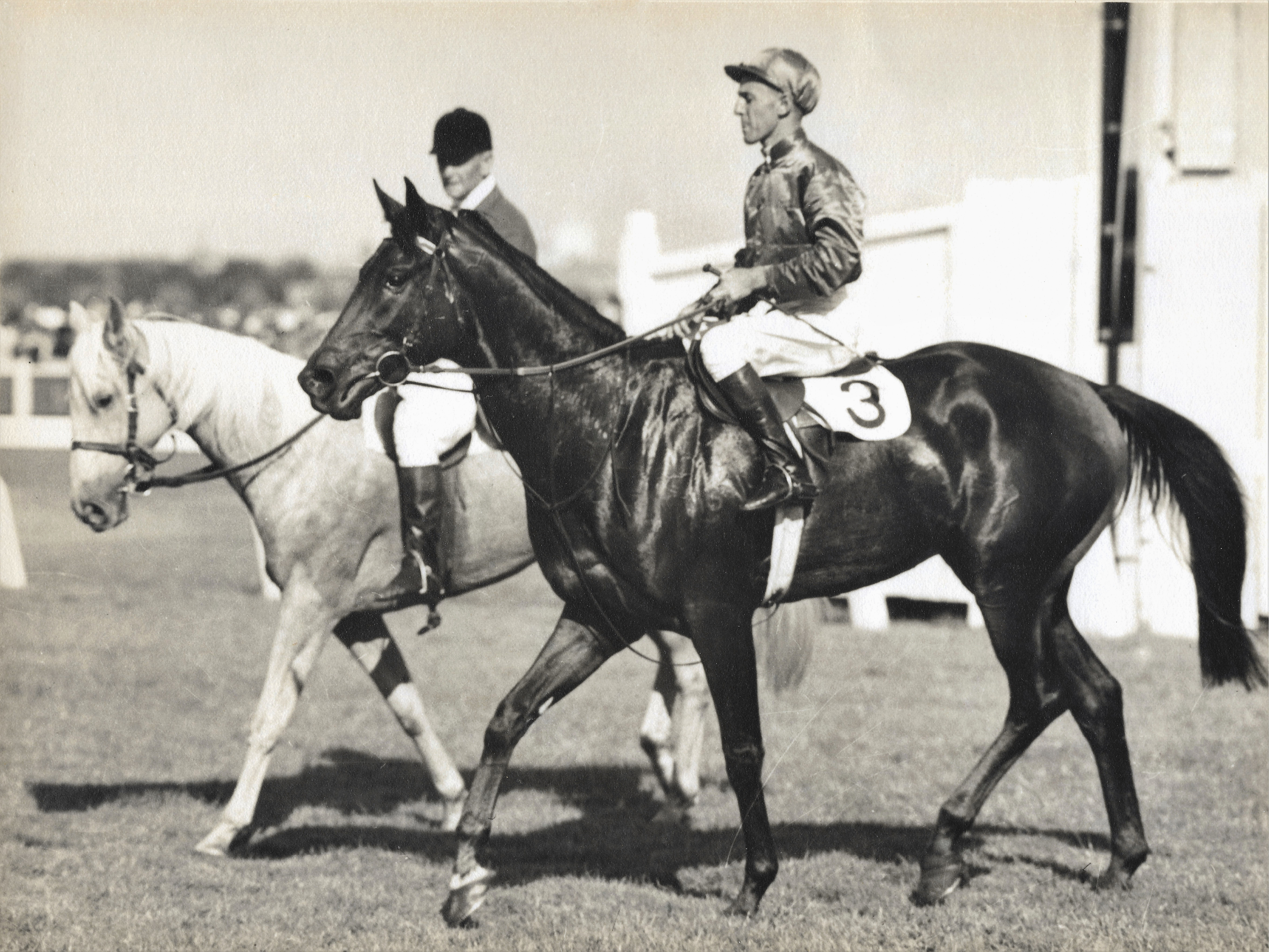
Delta,1950 winner

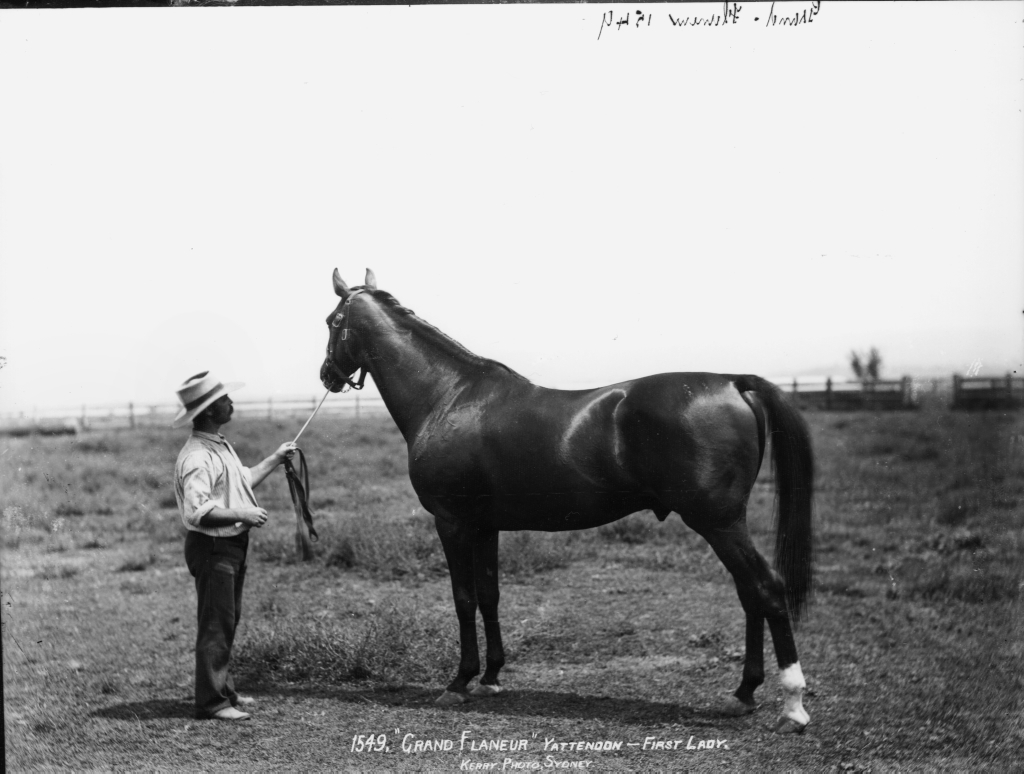
Grand Flaneur winner of the 1881 VRC St Leger

First run in 1857, the race was originally held in March as part of the Victoria Racing Club Autumn Carnival. In 1907 the race was run on the same race card as the Newmarket Handicap.

In an effort to promote the Australian Thoroughbred breeding industry, from 1932 to 1956 geldings were banned from competing in the St. Leger. Past St Leger Stakes winners include Australian Racing Hall of Fame inductees Grand Flaneur (1881), Poseidon (1907), Phar Lap (1930), Tranquil Star (1941) and Tulloch (1958). Several winners also captured Australia's most prestigious race, the Melbourne Cup. They are: Grand Flaneur (1881), Phar Lap (1930), Comic Court (1949), Delta (1950), and Gurner's Lane (1982). In 1956, Sailor's Guide won the race and in 1958 raced in North America where he defeated a top international field in the forerunner to the Breeders' Cup Turf, the then very prestigious Washington, D.C. International Stakes.

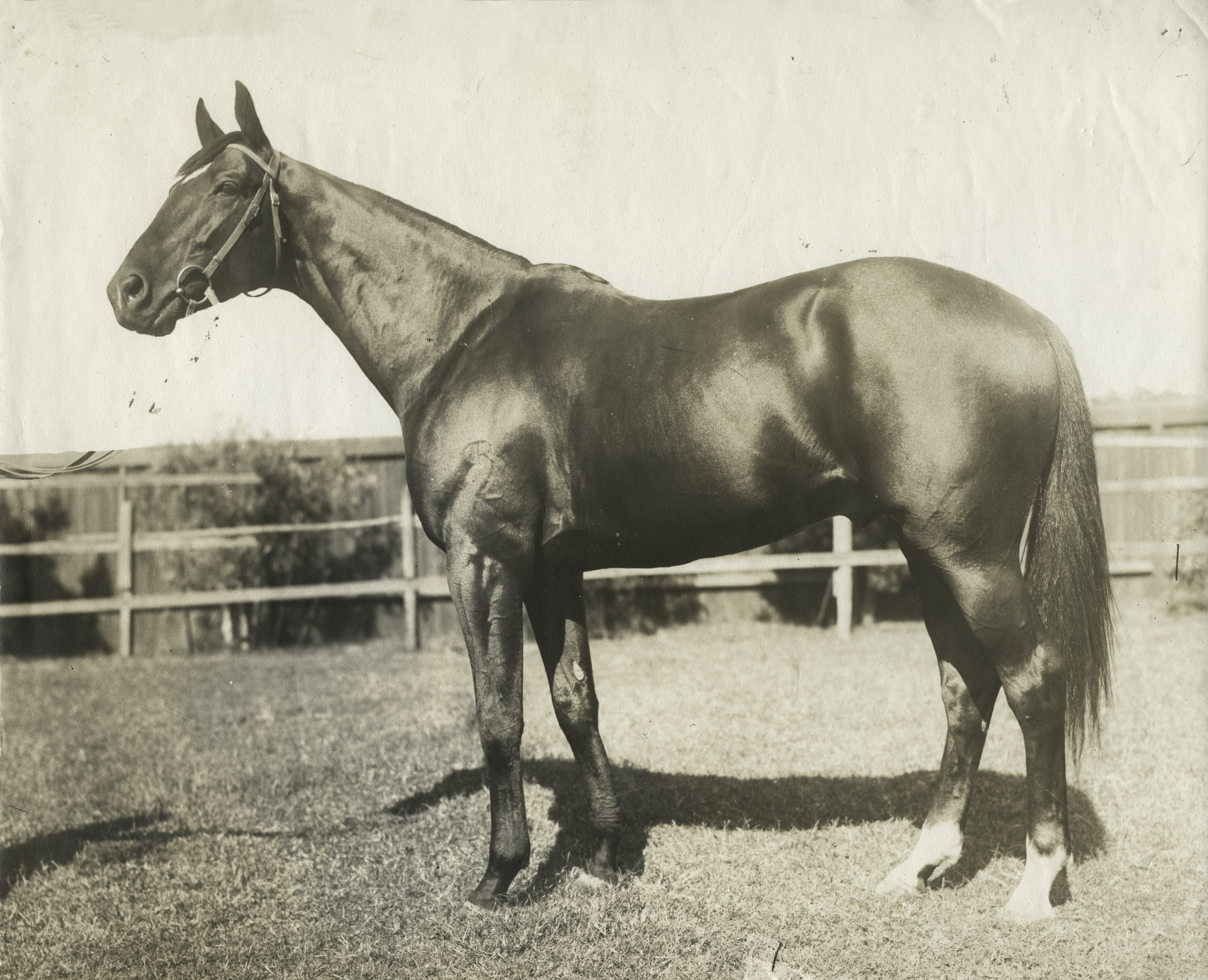
Poseidon, 1907 winner

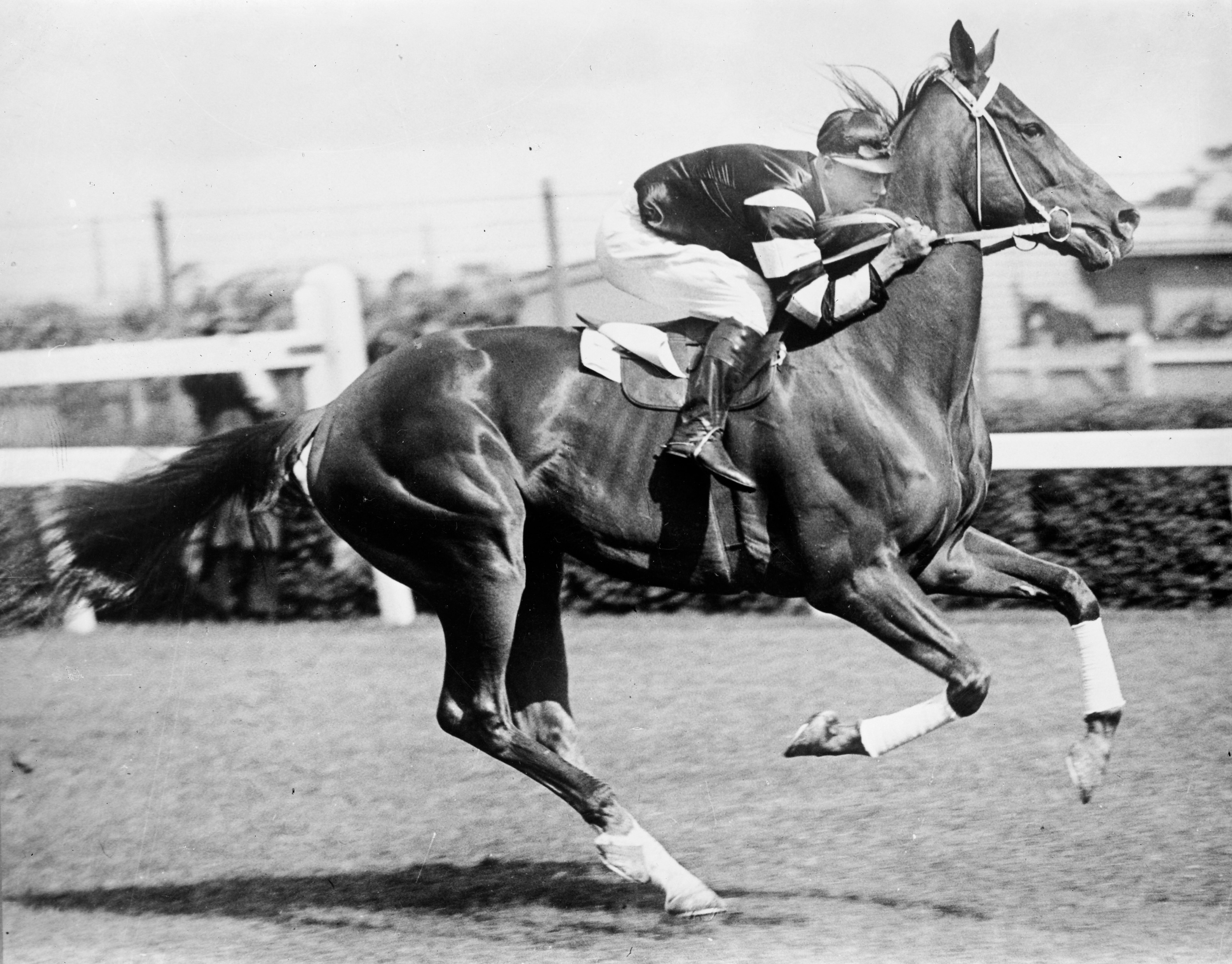
Phar Lap, 1930 winner

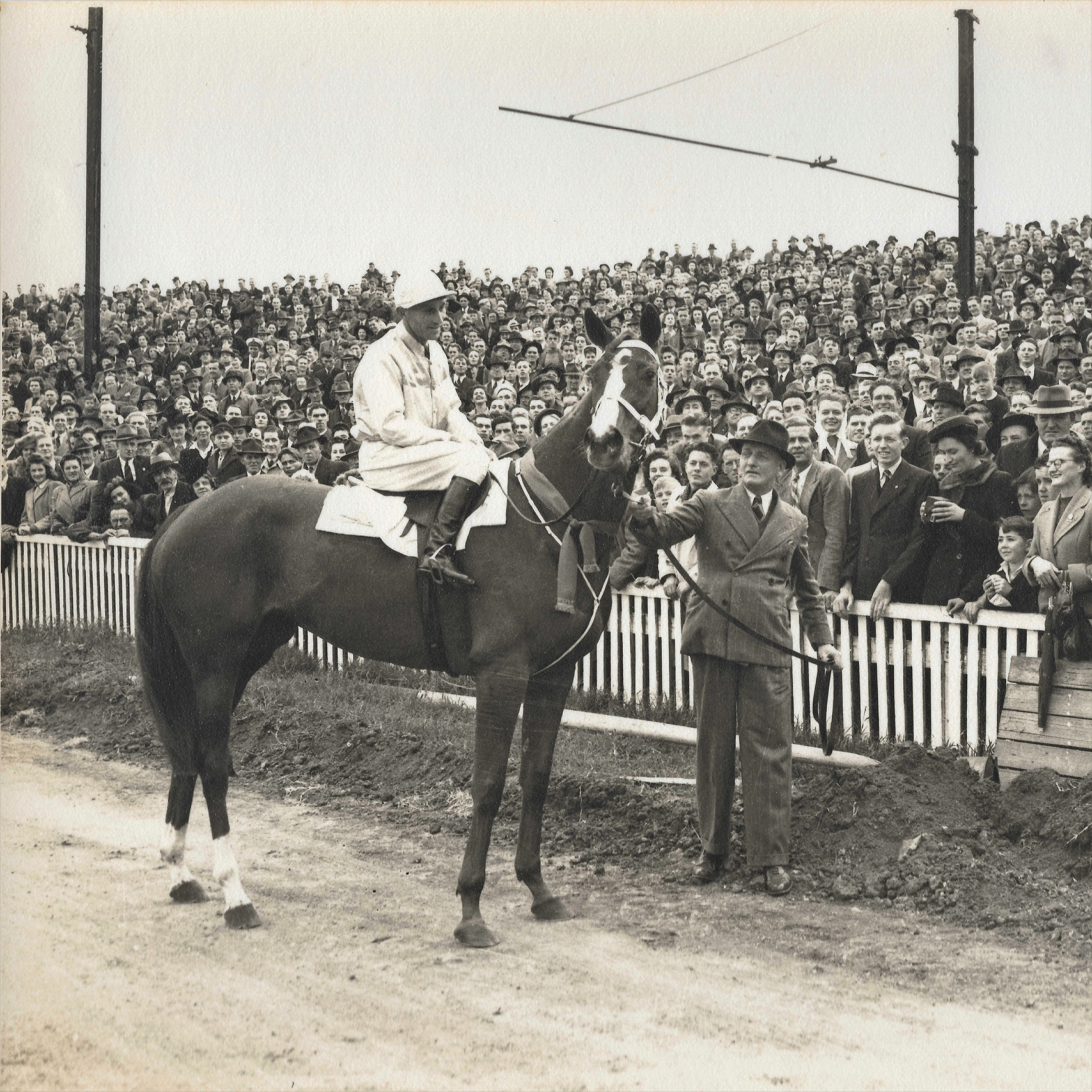
Tranquil Star, 1941 winner

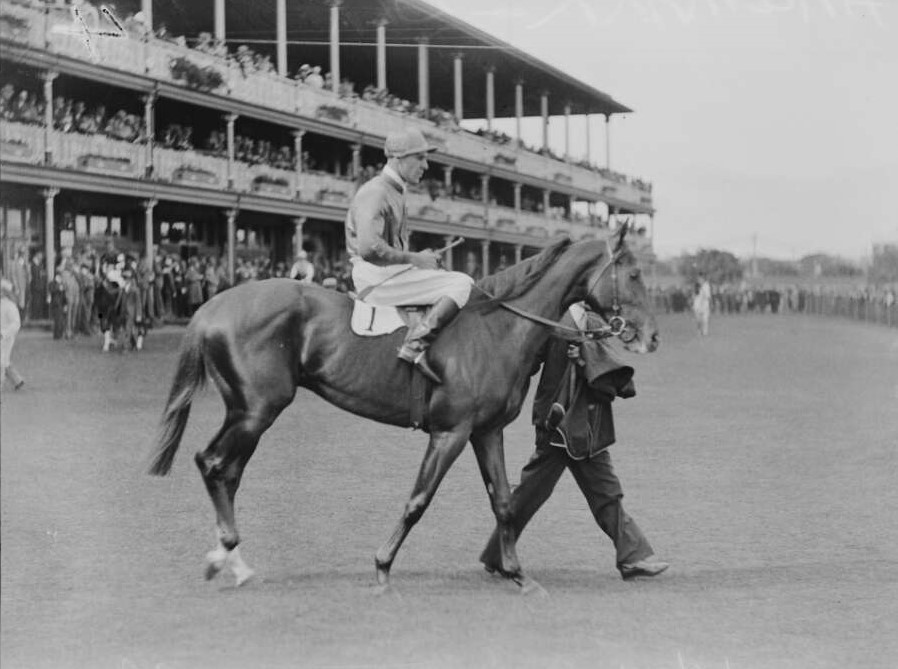
Hall Mark, 1934 winner

=== Venue ===
The St. Leger was hosted by Moonee Valley Racecourse in 2001 and again in 2007 due to track refurbishments being carried out at the Flemington racecourse.

=== Distance ===
The race was held over a distance of 14 furlongs, 132 yards until 1973 when it was modified to the metric distance of 2800 metres. In 1975 the race was run over 2700 metres. In 2001 and 2007, the distance was changed to 2500 metres when the race was run at Moonee Valley Racecourse while Flemington was under redevelopment.

=== Grade ===
- 1857–1979 - Principal Race
- 1980–1990 - Group 2
- 1991–2005 - Group 3
- 2006 onwards - Listed Race

=== Records ===
Previously tied with T.J. Smith at six wins, in 2005 Bart Cummings set the record for most victories by a trainer when he won the race for the seventh time.

== 1953 racebook ==
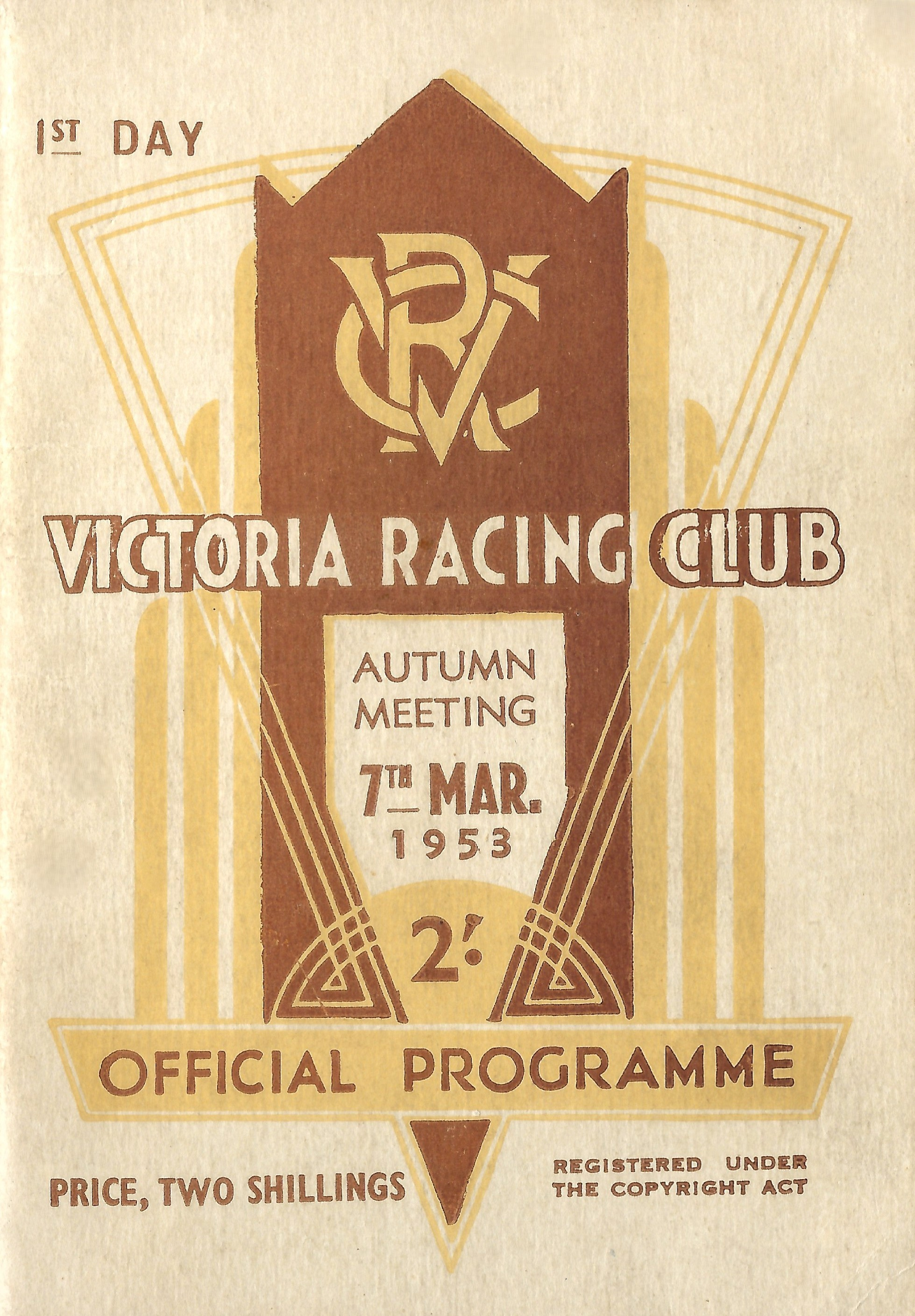
1953 VRC St Leger Stakes racebook front cover

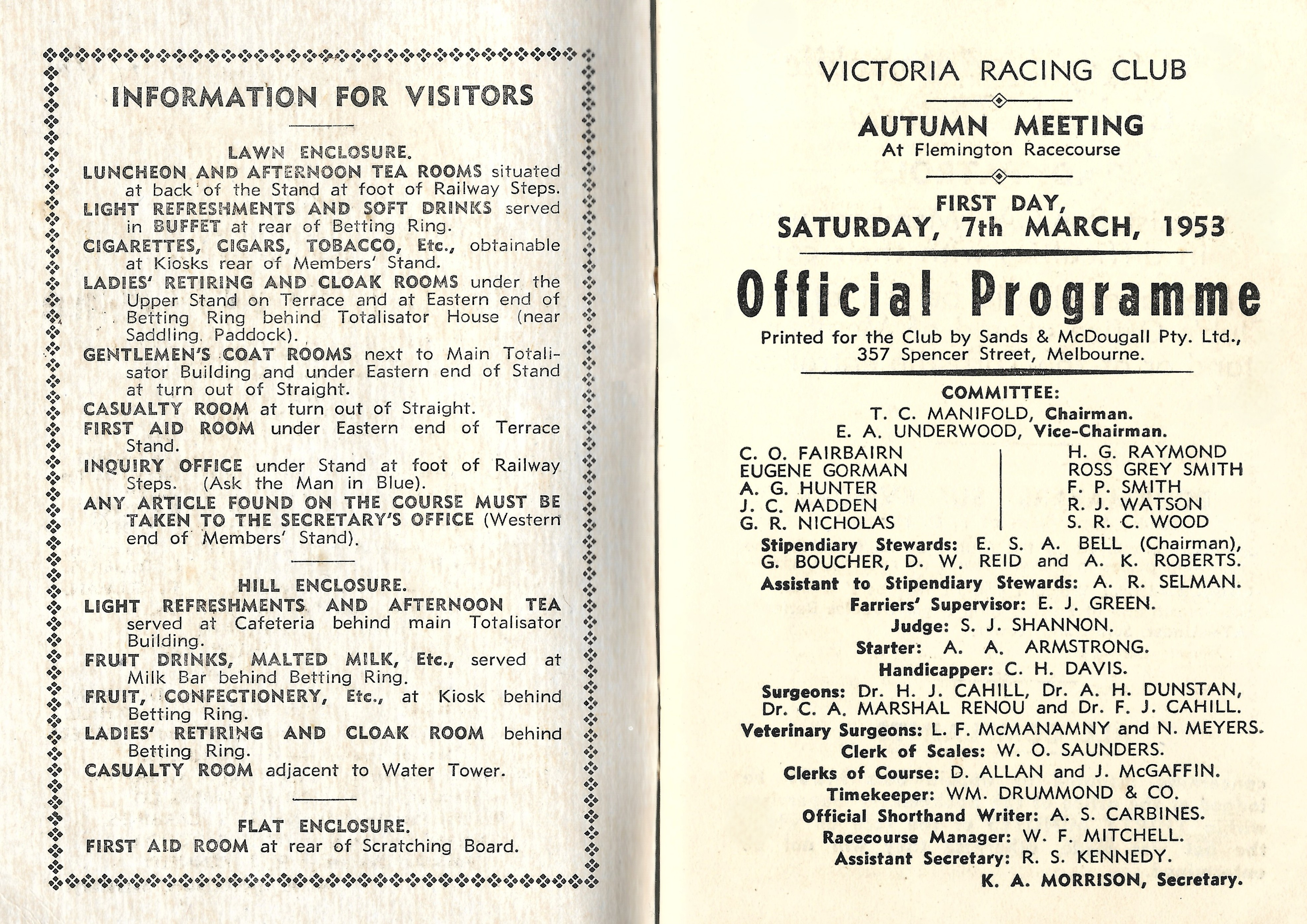
1953 VRC St Leger Stakes showing raceday officials

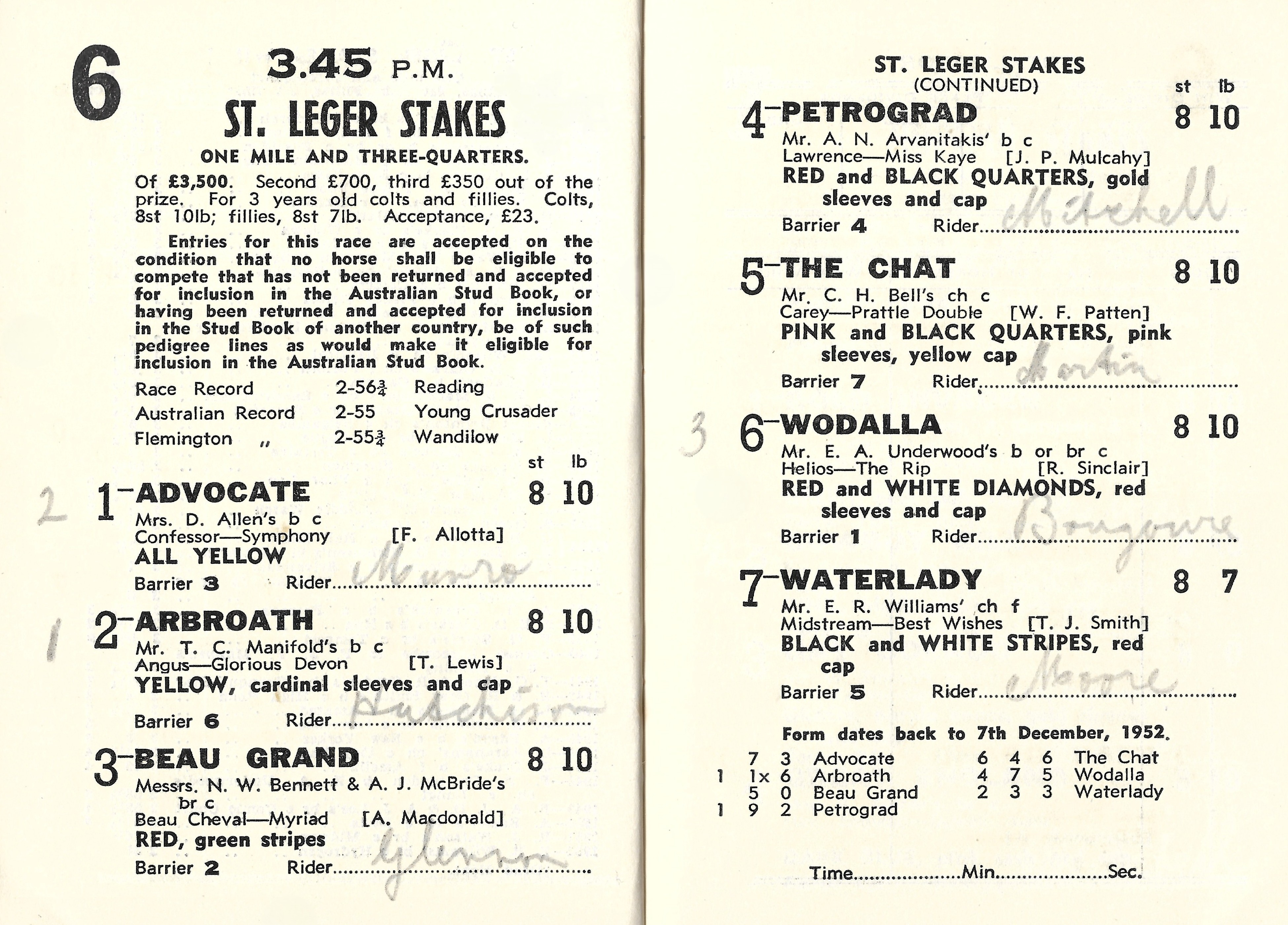
1953 VRC St Leger Stakes showing the winner, Arbroath

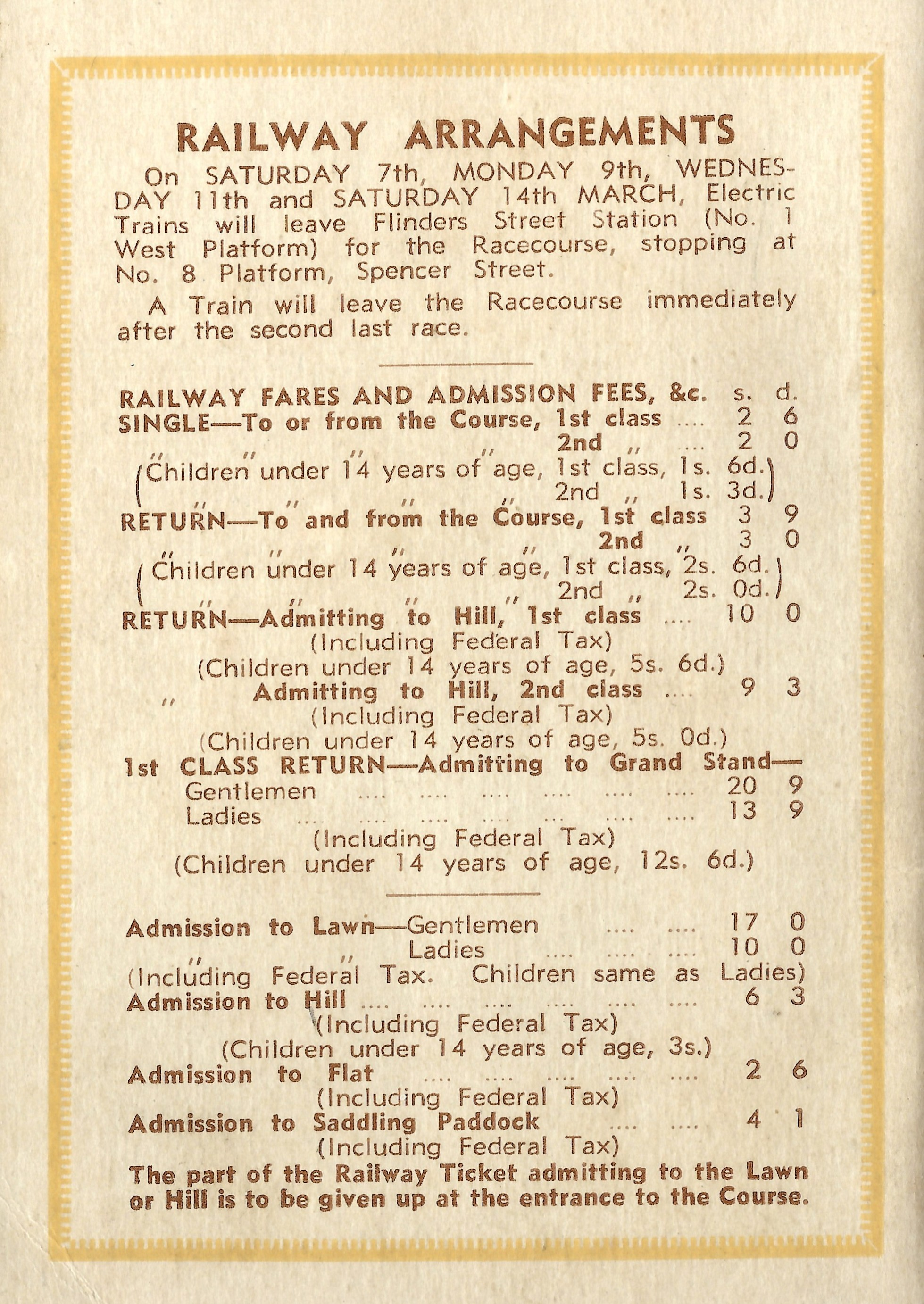
1953 VRC St Leger Stakes showing railway and admission charges

== Winners ==
The following are past winners of the race.

- 2026 - Silvasista
- 2025 - American Wolf
- 2024 - Ahuriri
- 2023 - Dunwoody
- 2022 - Alegron
- 2021 - Through Irish Eyes
- 2020 - Sacramento
- 2019 - Transact
- 2018 - Runaway
- 2017 - Dornier
- 2016 - Cool Chap
- 2015 - Authoritarian
- 2014 - Order of the Sun
- 2013 - Hippopus
- 2012 - Vatuvei
- 2011 - Right Of Refusal
- 2010 - Exceptionally
- 2009 - Berlioz
- 2008 - †Inkster / Moment In Time
- 2007 - Lazer Sharp
- 2006 - Dolphin Jo
- 2005 - Accumulate
- 2004 - Desert Clearance
- 2003 - Sir Pentire
- 2002 - Grey Song
- 2001 - Big Pat
- 2000 - Teddy Bear
- 1999 - Sunday Gold
- 1998 - Bohemiath
- 1997 - Wexford
- 1996 - St Shannon
- 1995 - Count Chivas
- 1994 - Gossips
- 1993 - Headcutter
- 1992 - Dark Ksar
- 1991 - Shivas Revenge
- 1990 - Frontier Boy
- 1989 - Waiaupal
- 1988 - Full At Last
- 1987 - Sharks Fin
- 1986 - Enchanteur
- 1985 - Waratahbay
- 1984 - Katies Boy
- 1983 - Lady Plutus
- 1982 - Gurner's Lane
- 1981 - Rio de Janeiro
- 1980 - Shogun
- 1979 - Rough N Tumble
- 1978 - So Called
- 1977 - Vacuum
- 1976 - Lord Dudley
- 1975 - Taras Bulba
- 1974 - Herminia
- 1973 - Godfather
- 1972 - Stop The Show
- 1971 - Trader
- 1970 - Epidaurus
- 1969 - King Pedro
- 1968 - Agena
- 1967 - Khalif
- 1966 - Prince Grant
- 1965 - Versailles
- 1964 - Better Lad
- 1963 - King Cobbler
- 1962 - Hansie
- 1961 - Reinsman
- 1960 - Nilarco
- 1959 - Chicola
- 1958 - Tulloch
- 1957 - Summalu
- 1956 - Sailor's Guide
- 1955 - Pride Of Egypt
- 1954 - Cromis
- 1953 - Arbroath
- 1952 - Hydrogen
- 1951 - Midway
- 1950 - Delta
- 1949 - Comic Court
- 1948 - Lungi
- 1947 - Amelia
- 1946 - Gay Lad
- 1945 - New Yorker
- 1944 - Lawrence
- 1943 - Amazed
- 1942 - High Road
- 1941 - Tranquil Star
- 1940 - Reading
- 1939 - Tempest
- 1938 - Hua
- 1937 - Peerage
- 1936 - Allunga
- 1935 - Sylvandale
- 1934 - †Hall Mark / Limarch
- 1933 - Oratory
- 1932 - Middle Watch
- 1931 - Veilmond
- 1930 - Phar Lap
- 1929 - Strephon
- 1928 - Trivalve
- 1927 - Epilogue
- 1926 - Belgamba
- 1925 - Spearfelt
- 1924 - Sandringham
- 1923 - Caserta
- 1922 - Furious
- 1921 - Nautical
- 1920 - Artilleryman
- 1919 - Eusebius
- 1918 - Prince Viridis
- 1917 - Colbert
- 1916 - Patrobas
- 1915 - Mountain Knight
- 1914 - Radnor
- 1913 - Wolawa
- 1912 - Wilari
- 1911 - Danaus
- 1910 - Prince Foote
- 1909 - Even Time
- 1908 - Mountain King
- 1907 - Poseidon
- 1906 - Lady Wallace
- 1905 - Munderah
- 1904 - Scottish King
- 1903 - Abundance
- 1902 - Grasspan
- 1901 - Finland
- 1900 - Parthian
- 1899 - Bobadil
- 1898 - Aurum
- 1897 - The Officer
- 1896 - Cabin Boy
- 1895 - Preston
- 1894 - Patron
- 1893 - Culloden
- 1892 - Strathmore
- 1891 - Gibraltar
- 1890 - Dreadnought
- 1889 - Volley
- 1888 - Abercorn
- 1887 - Trident
- 1886 - Matchlock
- 1885 - Silver King
- 1884 - Martini Henry
- 1883 - Navigator
- 1882 - Commotion
- 1881 - Grand Flaneur
- 1880 - Caspian
- 1879 - Bosworth
- 1878 - First King
- 1877 - Adelaide
- 1876 - Richmond
- 1875 - Melbourne
- 1874 - Sea Spray
- 1873 - Blue Peter II
- 1872 - Hamlet
- 1871 - The Fawn
- 1870 - Lamplighter
- 1869 - Gasworks
- 1868 - Fireworks
- 1867 - Fishhook
- 1866 - Angler
- 1865 - Illumination
- 1864 - Oriflamme
- 1863 - Barwon
- 1862 - Camden
- 1861 - Presto
- 1860 - Flying Buck
- 1859 - Brownlock
- 1858 - Fusilier
- 1857 - Artaxerxes

† Dead heat

== See also ==
- List of Australian Group races
- Group races
