= Gurner's Lane =

New Zealand-bred Thoroughbred racehorse

- Sire: Sir Tristram (IRE)
- Grandsire: Sir Ivor (USA)
- Dam: Taiona (NZ)
- Damsire: Sovereign Edition (IRE)
- Sex: Gelding
- Foaled: 7 October 1978
- Died: 2000
- Country: New Zealand
- Colour: Chestnut
- Breeder: Cambridge Stud
- Owner: Williams St. Syndicate No. 2
- Trainer: Geoff Murphy
- Record: 41: 7-5-5
- Earnings: $558,400

Major wins
- Group One; Caulfield Cup (1982); Melbourne Cup (1982); Group Two; VRC St Leger (1982); AJC St Leger (1982); Newcastle Gold Cup (1982)

Awards
- Australian Champion Racehorse of the Year (1983)

Honours
- Gurner's Lane Handicap contested at Flemington
- Last updated on 19 October 2011

Gurner's Lane (1978−2000) was a Thoroughbred racehorse who was the 1983 champion. He is best remembered for winning the Caulfield and Melbourne Cups double in 1982. Gurner's Lane was just the seventh of 11 horses to complete this rare double.

Foaled in New Zealand, and trained by Geoff Murphy, Gurner's Lane was sired by Sir Tristram.

His dam was Taiona, who also produced the Group One winners Sovereign Red and Trichelle (both full siblings), and was named New Zealand Broodmare of the Year in 1981 and 1983.

Gurner's Lane was the first of three Melbourne Cup winners by Sir Tristram, preceding Empire Rose (1988) and Brew (2000), and was bred on the same cross as Empire Rose, as both were out of Sovereign Edition mares.

== Racing career ==
Prior to winning the Caulfield Cup and Melbourne Cup, Gurner's Lane had won the VRC and AJC St Legers during the autumn of 1982, and had run third in the AJC Derby. Returning at four years, he won the Newcastle Gold Cup and was fourth in The Metropolitan.

Ridden in the Caulfield Cup by Brent Thomson, at 53.5 kilograms, Gurner's Lane defeated Gala Mascot and Veloso.

Mick Dittman rode Gurner's Lane in the Melbourne Cup. He was penalised two-and-a-half kilograms for the Caulfield Cup victory, which took his Melbourne Cup weight to 56 kilograms. For a four-year-old gelding this was just one kilogram below weight-for-age and, relative to the weight-for-age scale, was the same weight as the older Kingston Town which was a winner of 13 Group One races. Turning for home Kingston Town sprinted clear for his jockey, Malcolm Johnston, and appeared likely to win until Mick Dittman brought Gurner's Lane through on the rails to bring "sadness to a million lovers of racing".

In the early part of 1983, Gurner's Lane broke down but had done enough to be named Australia's champion racehorse. After a lengthy break, he returned to the track but failed to recapture his best form and was retired.

== See also ==
- Thoroughbred racing in New Zealand
