= Theodore Green (horse trainer) =

Australian race horse trainer (1925-1999)

- Born: 19 November 1925
- Died: 4 May 1999 (aged 73)
- Occupations: race horse trainer and jockey mentor

Theodore Green (19 November 1925 – 4 May 1999), often referred to as Theo Green, was an Australian race horse trainer and jockey mentor. He was made a member of the Australian Racing Hall of Fame in 2002.

== Early life ==
Green spent time as a wharfie, a boxer, labourer, electrician and an apprentice jockey before becoming a trainer.

== Career ==
Some of the Australia's most successful jockeys were trained by Green, including Darren Beadman, Ron Quinton and Malcolm Johnston. John Duggan, Maurice Logue and the late David Green (no relation). Green's jockeys would go on to ride thousands of winners between them in Australia and win numerous Sydney Jockey Premierships. “The boss was deaf in one ear so you had to speak up,” Beadman recalled. “And when he talked, his voice had authority. You had to listen. Always present was the dry sense of humour.”

In Green's honour, the eponymous Theo Green Medal is awarded to Sydney's champion apprentice jockey each year. Green trained the horse Inspired, the 1984 Group 1 Golden Slipper winner. Inspired was ridden by champion jockey Darren Beadman who described Green as a 'special person'. Green trained the winners of other Group 1 races, the Blue Diamond, AJC Oaks and Guineas. Green once said "If the jockeys sat still, the horses would run faster".

== Boxing ==
Boxing is in Theo Green's blood, his father Theo Green Snr was a leading Australian flyweight boxer & boxing trainer. His uncle Jackie Green was a champion featherweight boxer who won Australian titles in 3 weight divisions and was inducted into the Australian National Boxing Hall of Fame in 2006.
