= AJC St Leger =

Australian horse race since 1841

St Leger Stakes (ATC)
- 1933 winner – Peter Pan
- Class: Group 3
- Location: Randwick Racecourse, Sydney
- Inaugurated: 1841
- Race type: Thoroughbred – flat
- Sponsor: The Star (2024)

Race information
- Distance: 2,600 metres (~1 5/8 miles)
- Surface: turf
- Track: right-handed
- Qualification: three years and older
- Weight: set weights with penalties
- Purse: A$500,000 (2024)

The AJC St Leger is an historical Australian Turf Club Thoroughbred horse race run over 2,600 metres (~1 5/8 miles) at Randwick Racecourse, Sydney, run under set weights with penalties for stayers three years and older.

== History ==
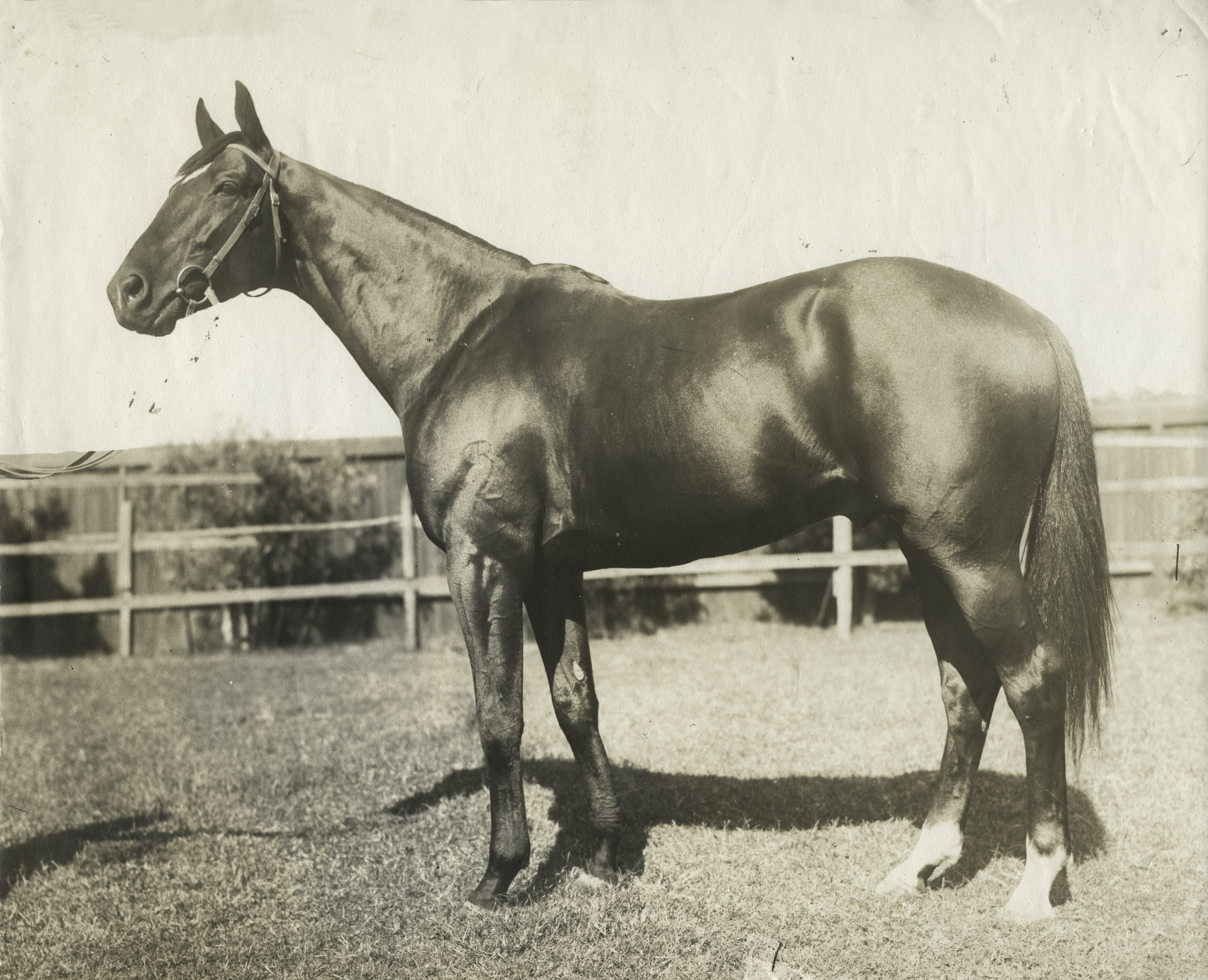
1907 winner – Poseidon

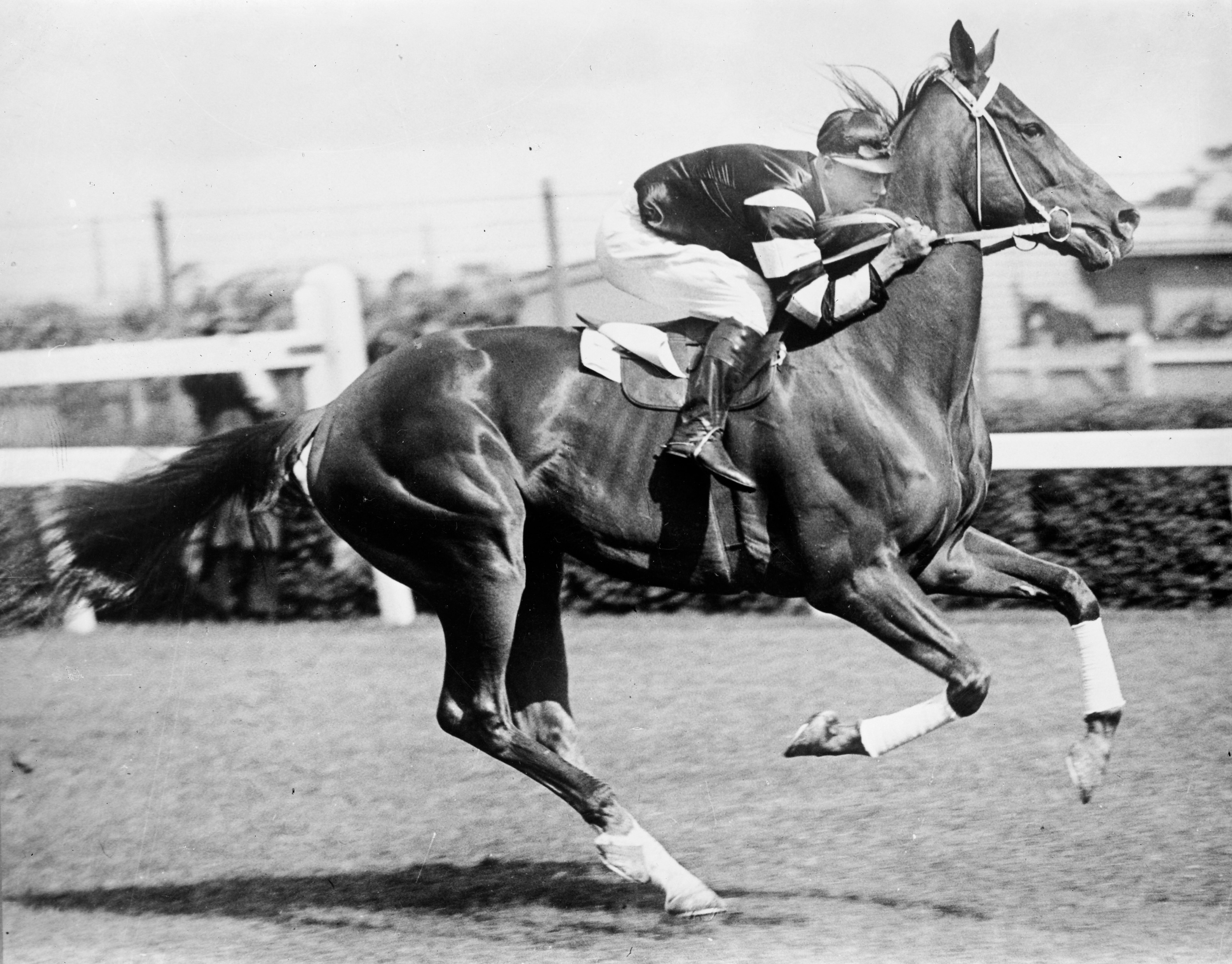
1930 winner – Phar Lap & Jim Pike

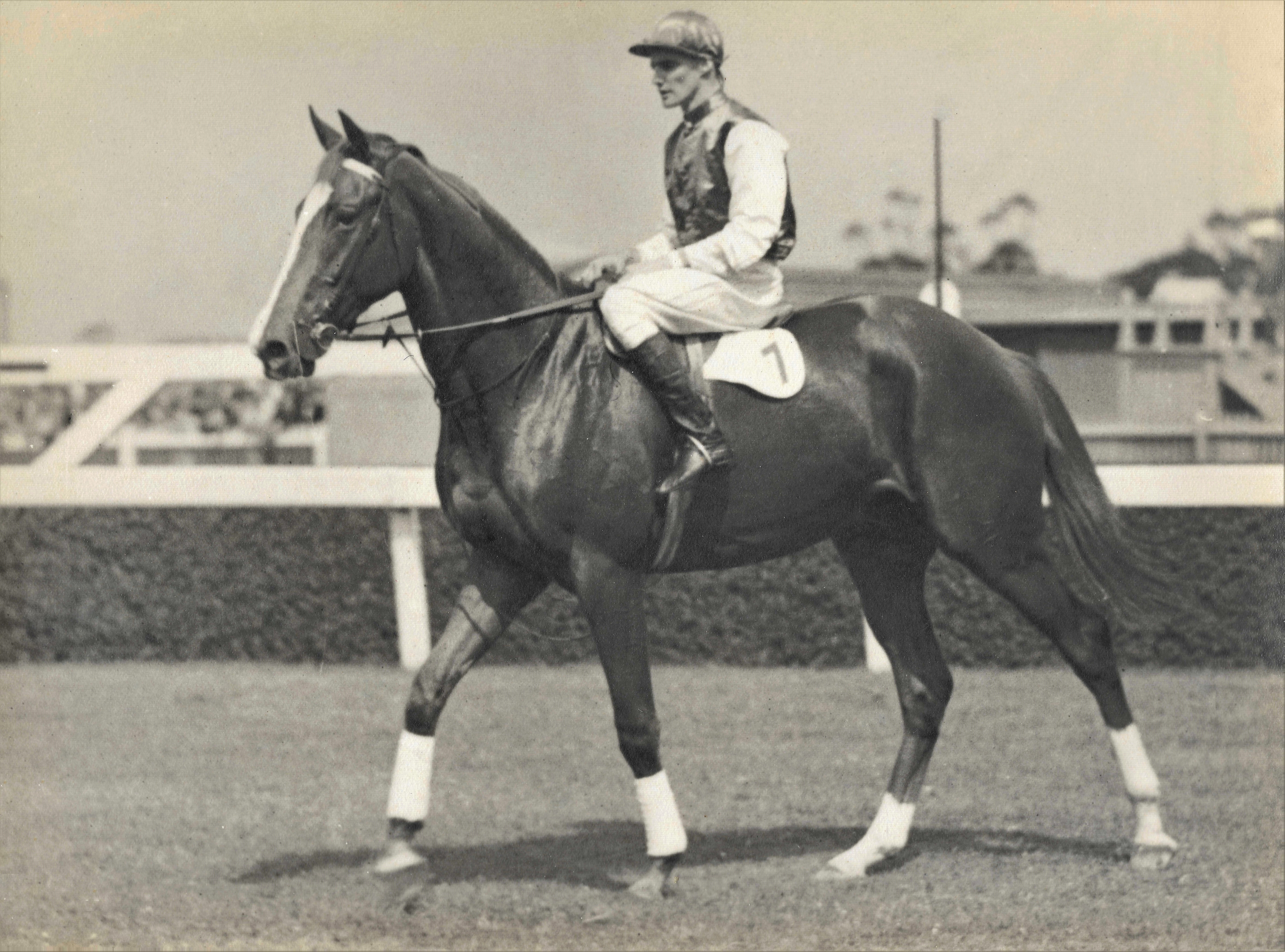
1937 winner – Gold Rod

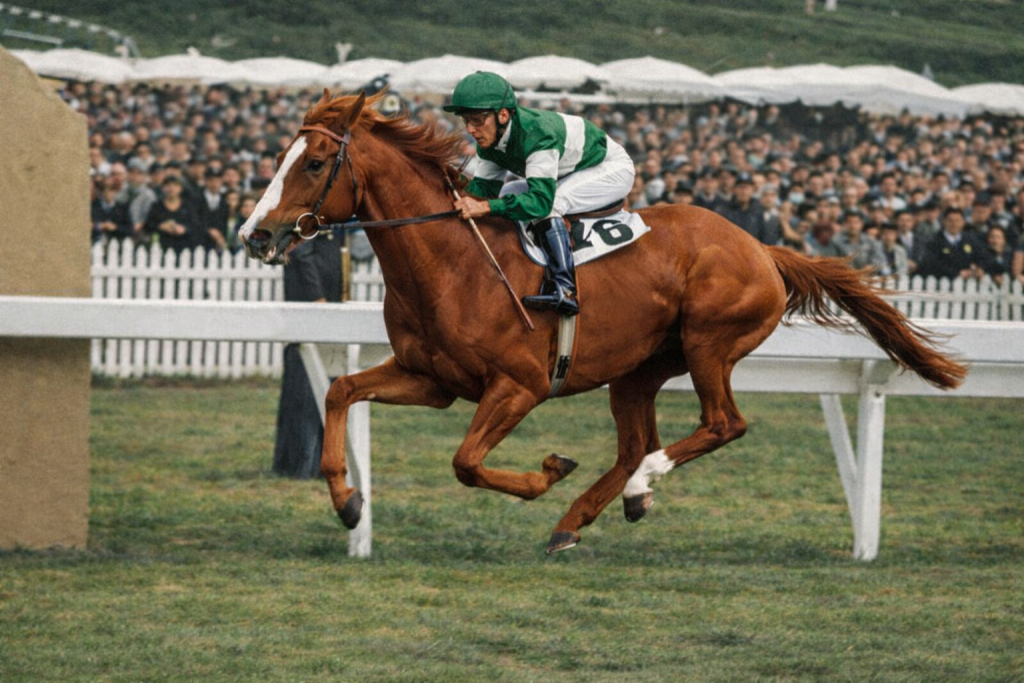
Carbon Copy, 1949 winner

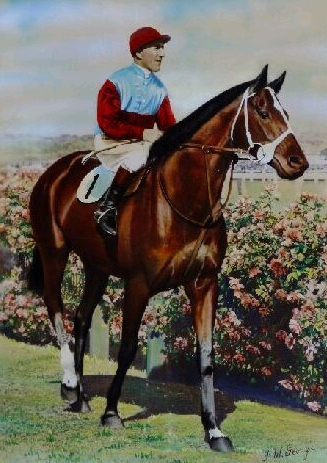
1941 winner – Lucrative

The AJC St Leger is the oldest classic race in Australia derived from the English race, first run in 1841 as a 3-year-old (3YO) event over 1½ miles at Homebush, Sydney and continued at the new Randwick Racecourse in 1861. Not run in 1854 & 1860 nor 1960–1979, or 2002–2016.

The principal race was re-instated by the AJC Committee again in 1980 graded at Group 2 level, encouraged by a direct descendent of Major General Anthony St Leger who instigated the St Leger Stakes, first run at Doncaster Racecourse in Northern England in 1776.

The race ended in 2001 and reappeared as the St Leger Stakes (ATC) in late 2017 with the expanded 15 million Everest carnival in October and since being reinstated has not received graded status until 2024.

Winners include Sky Heights (2001), Tie The Knot (2000), Linesman (1996), Castletown (1991), Tawrrific (1989), Beau Zam (1988), Handy Proverb (1986), Gurner's Lane (1982),Tulloch (1958), Sailor's Guide (1956), Hydrogen (1952), Playboy (1950), Carbon Copy (1949), Gold Rod (1937), Peter Pan (1933), Phar Lap (1930), Limerick (1927), Windbag (1925), Prince Foote (1910), Poseidon (1907) and Newhaven (1897).

=== Distance ===
- 1841–1859 – 1 1/2 miles (~2400 metres)
- 1861–1959 – 1 3/4 miles (~2800 metres)
- 1980–2000 – 2800 metres
- 2001 onwards – 2600 metres (~1 5/8 miles)

=== Grade ===
- 1841–1979 – Principal race
- 1980–2001 – Group 2
- 2018–2023 – Non graded
- 2024 onwards – Group 3

== 1930, 1932, and 1933 racebooks ==
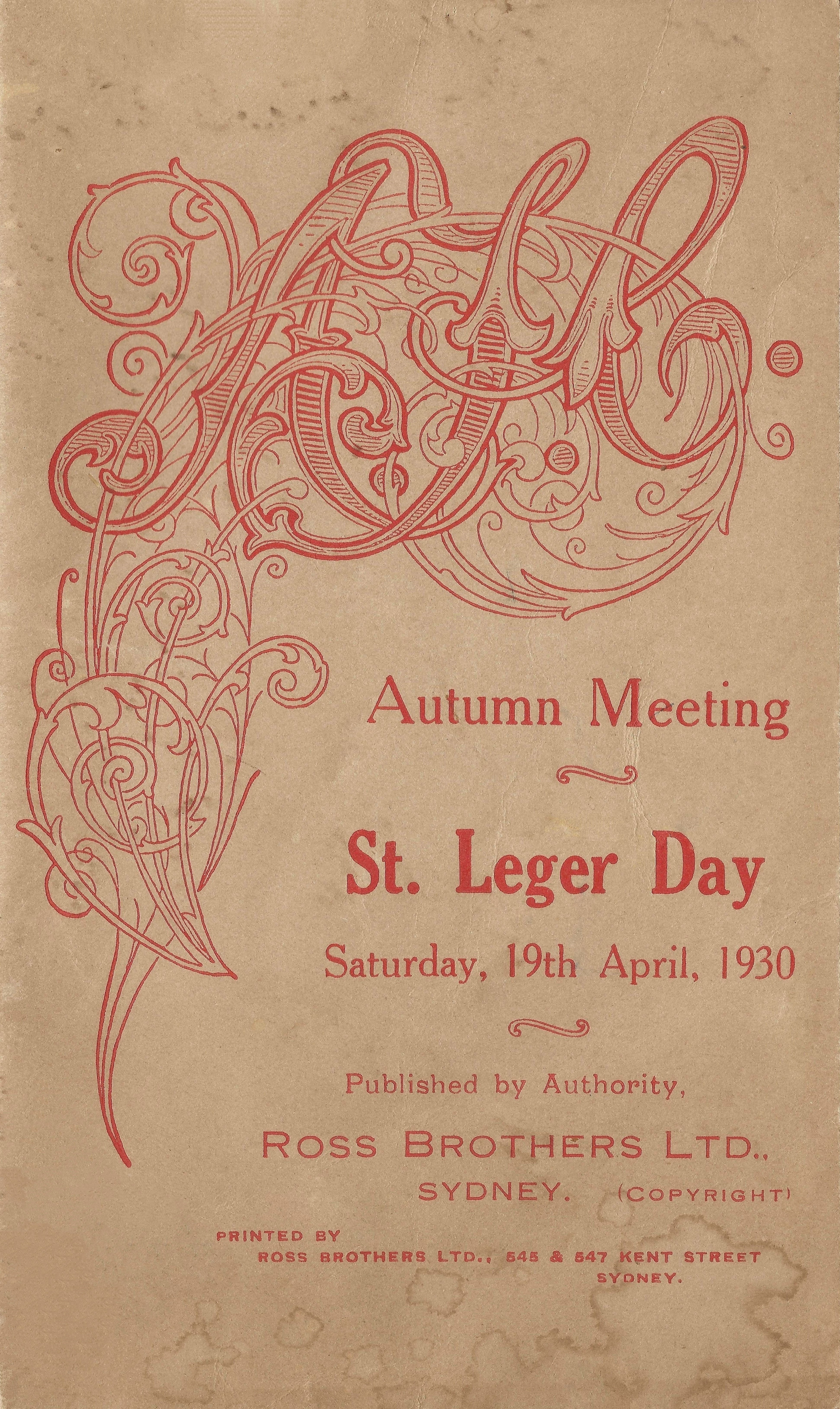
1930 AJC St Leger racebook front cover

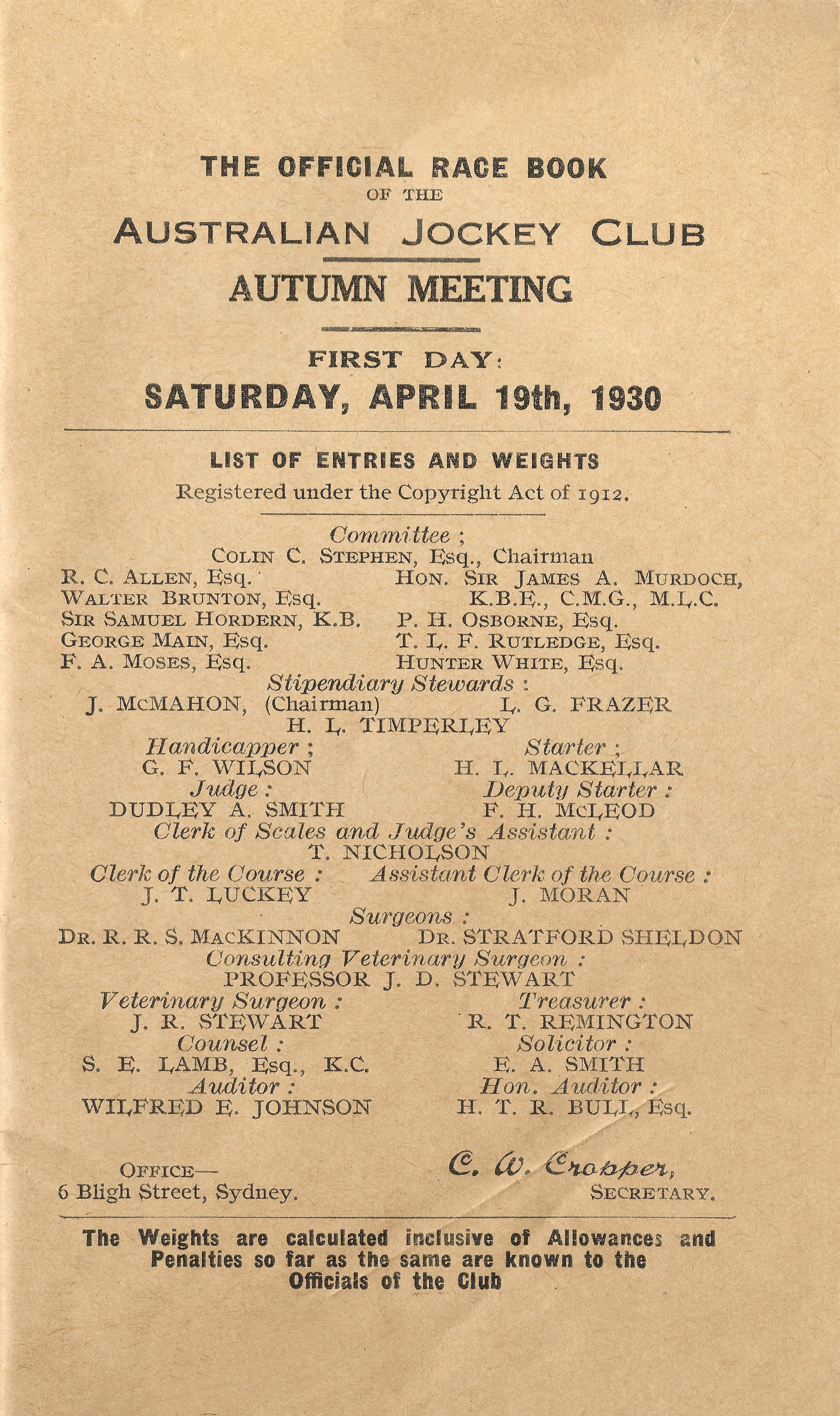
1930 AJC St Leger showing raceday officials

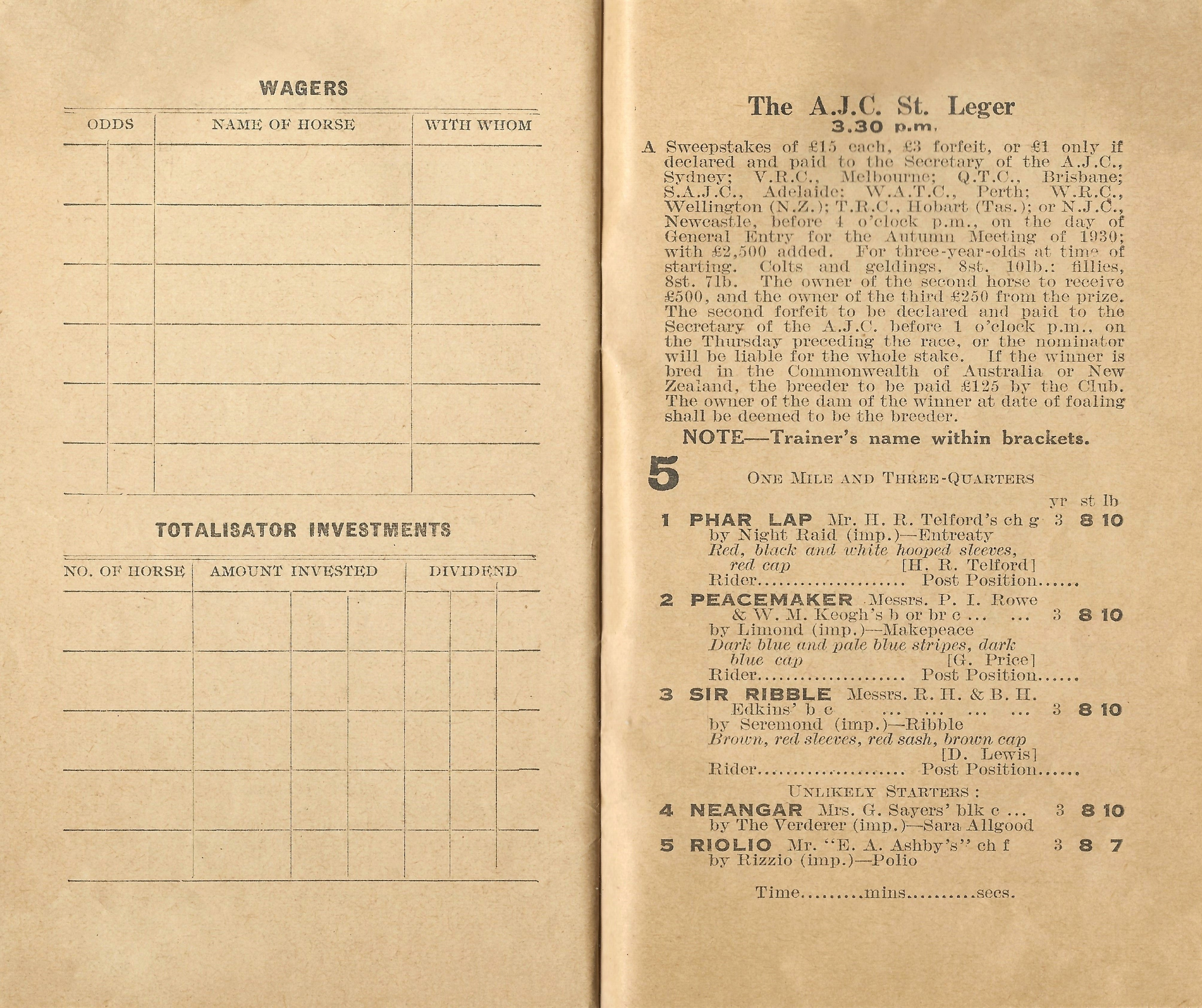
1930 St Leger showing the winner, Phar Lap

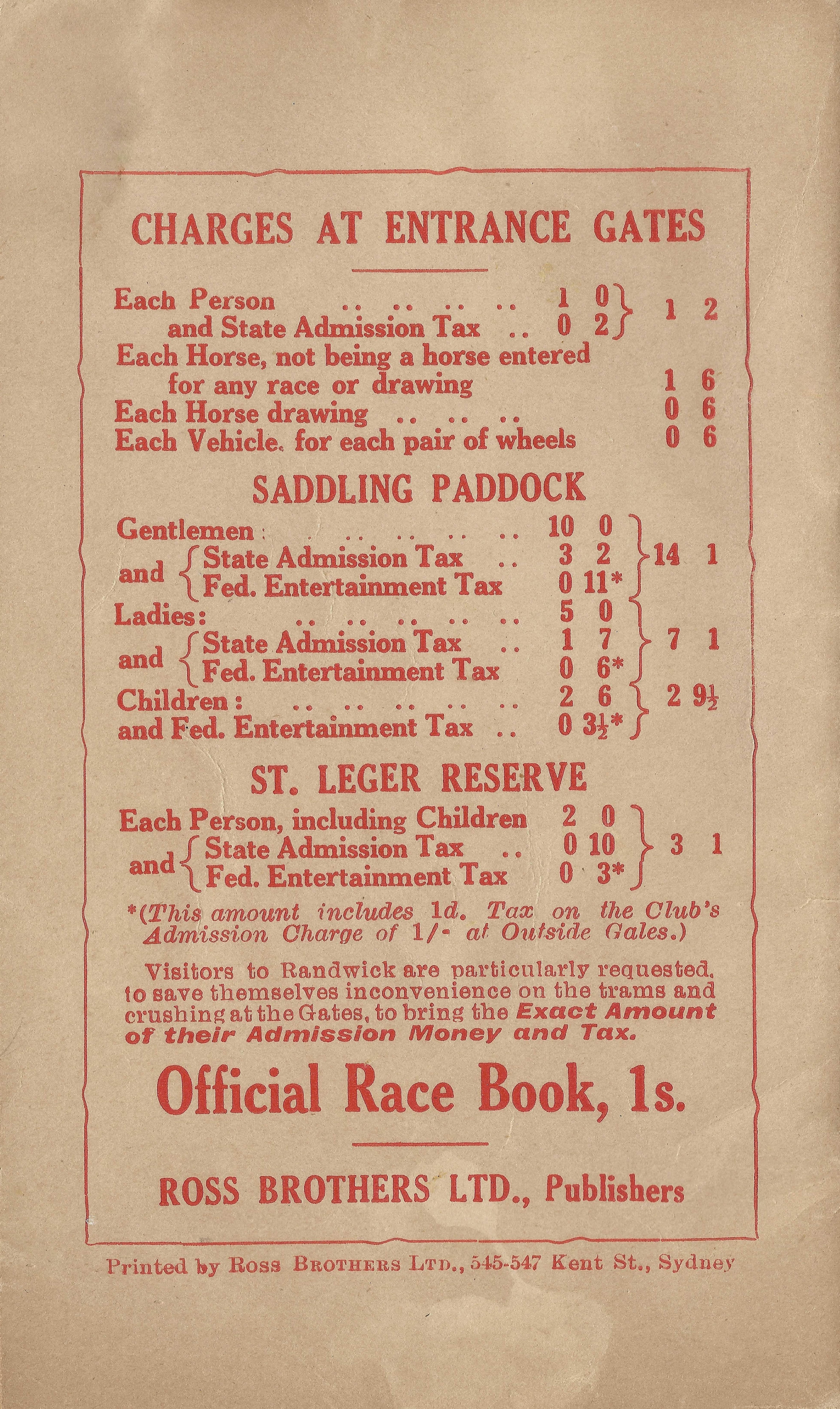
Back cover showing charges at the entrance gates

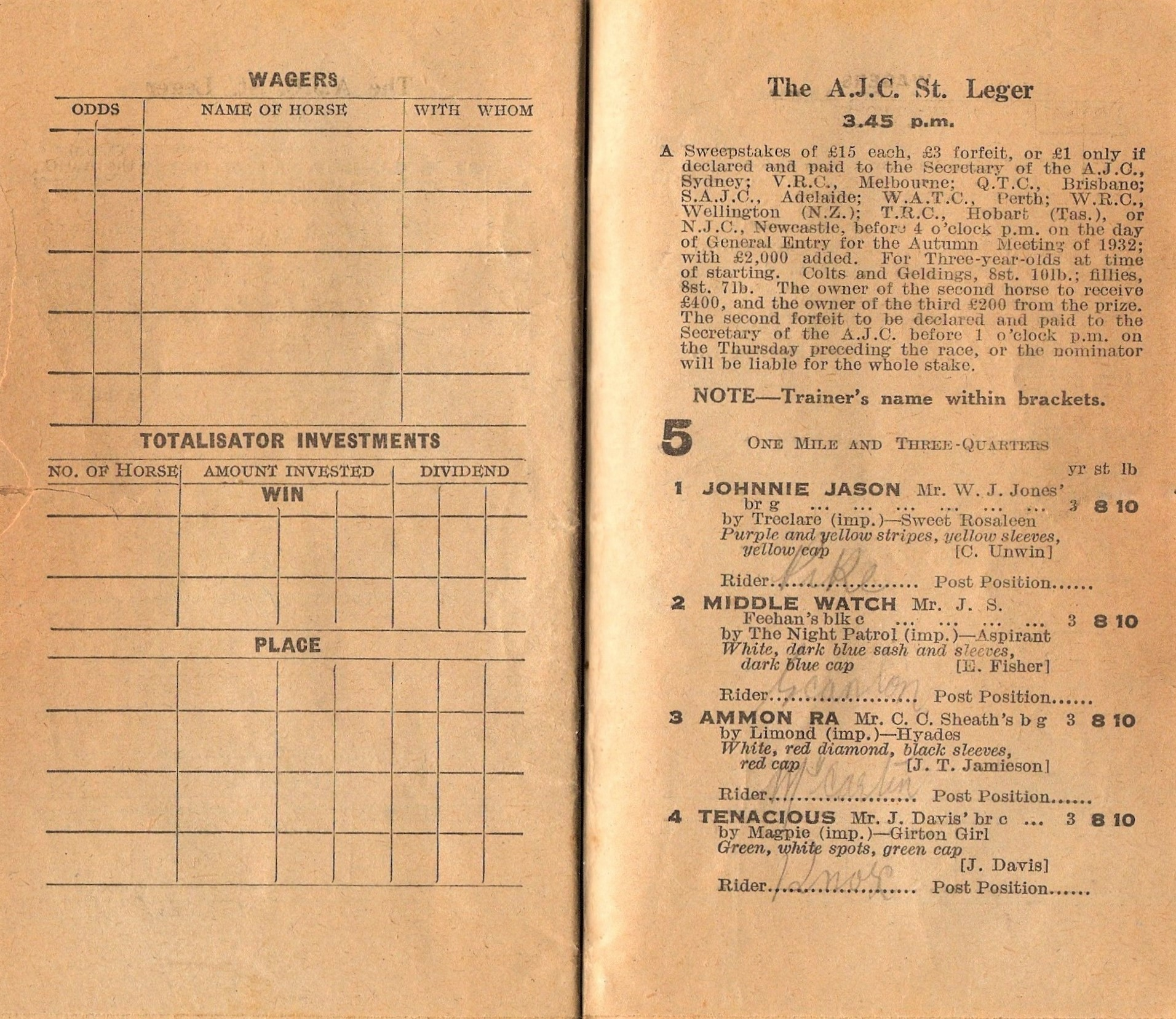
1932 AJC St Leger racebook showing the winner, Middle Watch

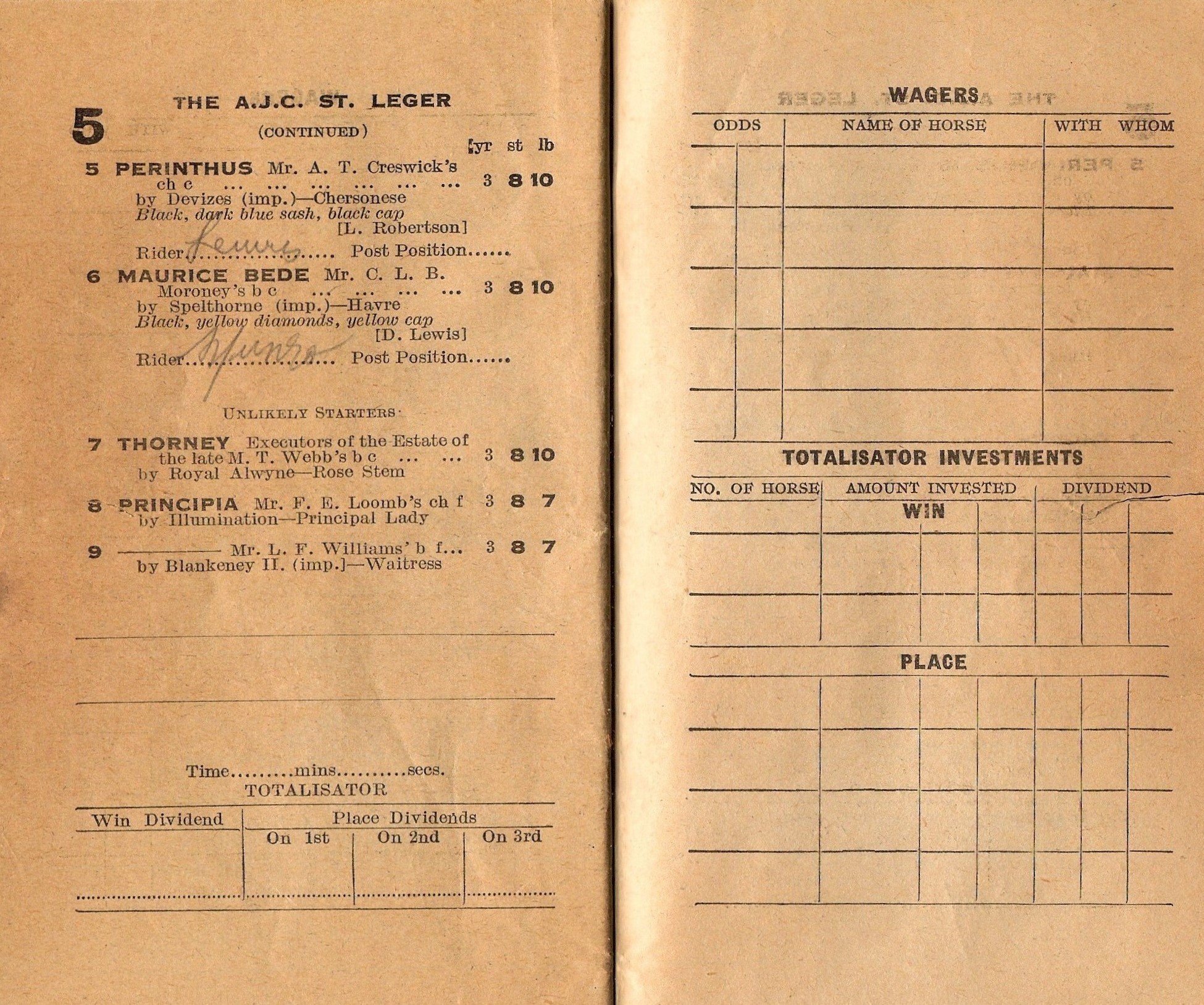
1932 AJC St Leger racebook starters and results

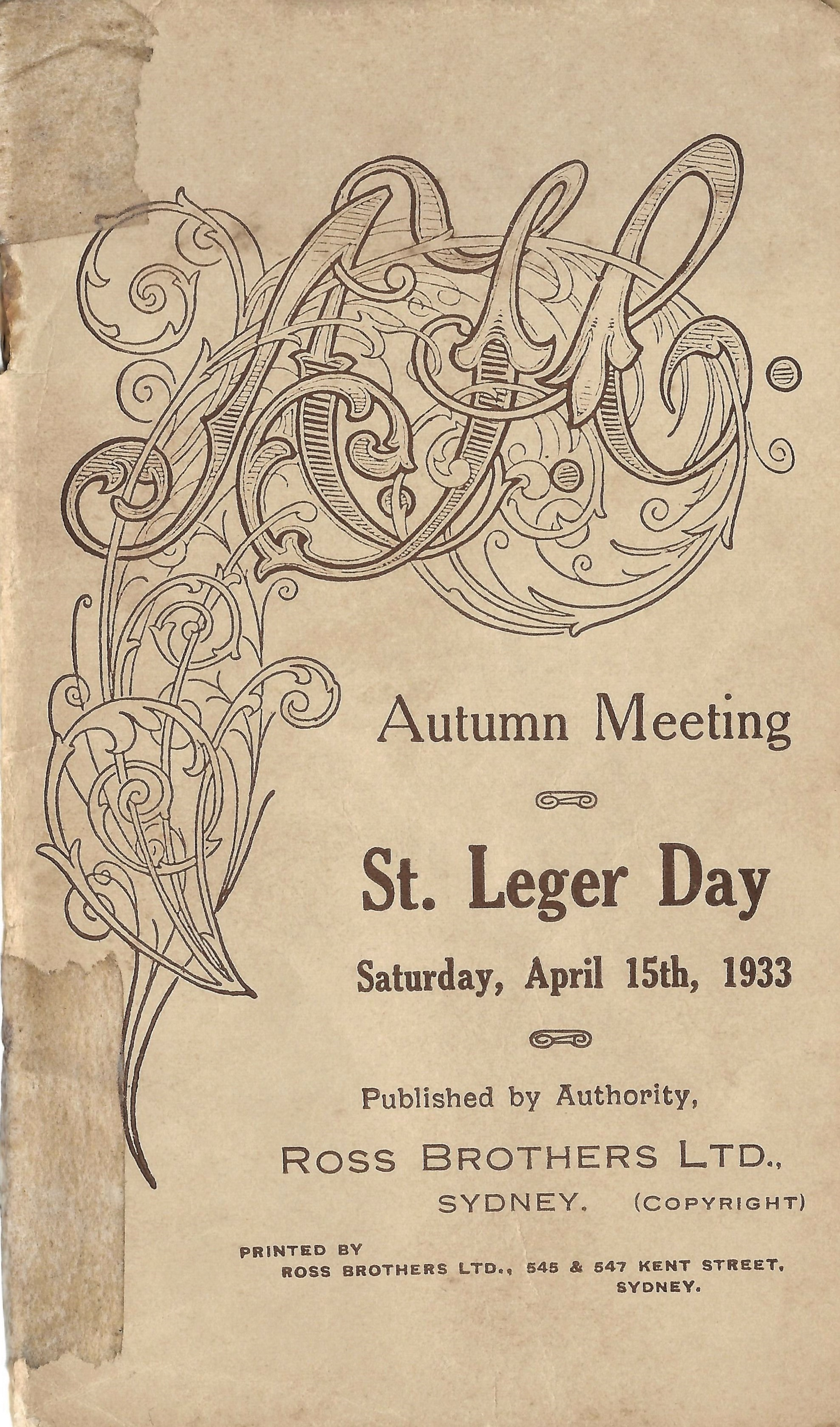
1933 AJC St Leger racebook front cover

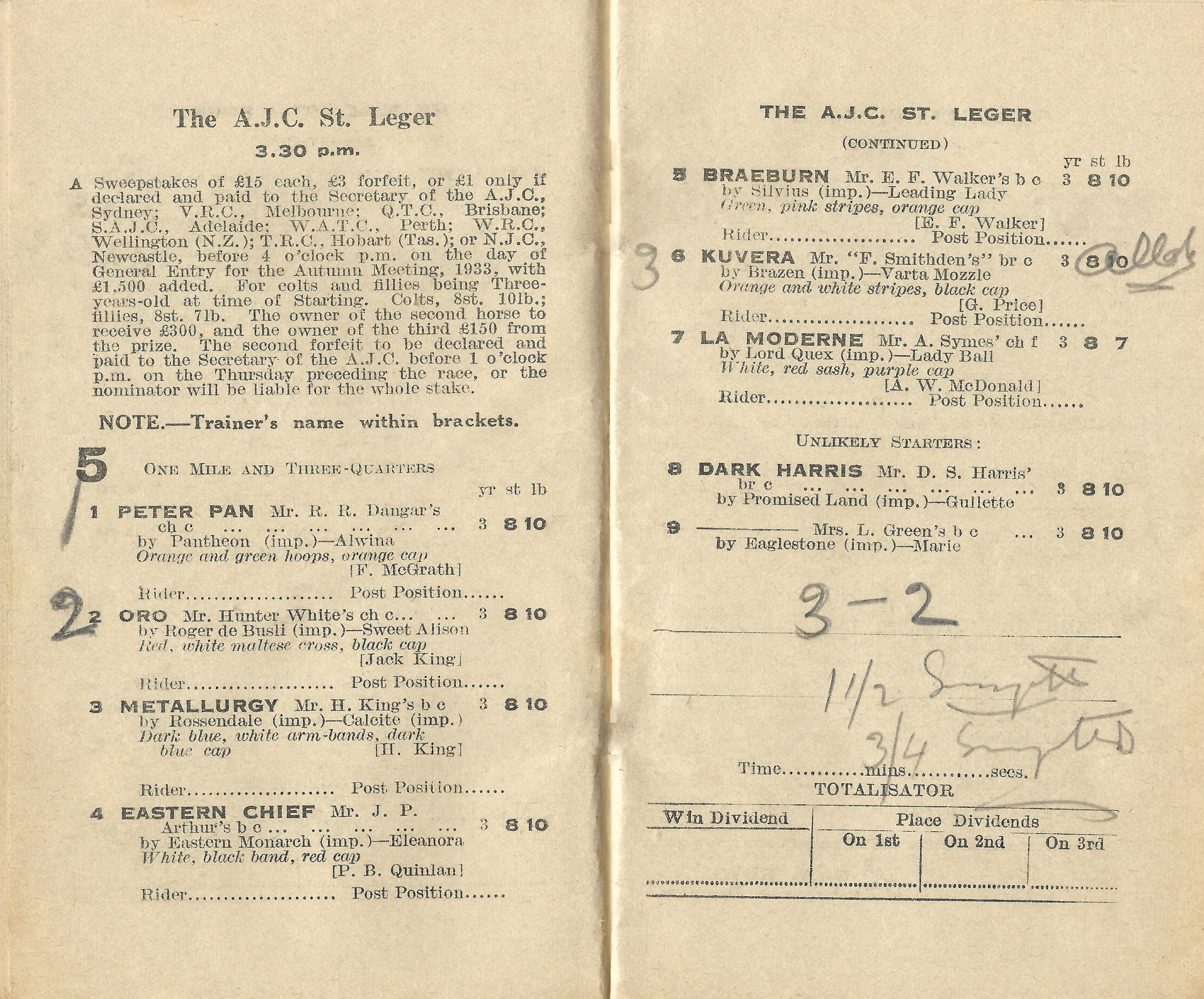
1933 AJC St Leger starters & results showing the winner, Peter Pan

== Winners ==
The following are past winners of the race.

- 2026 - So You Are
- 2025 – Travolta
- 2024 – Athabascan
- 2023 – Land Legend
- 2022 – Stockman
- 2021 – Warning
- 2020 – Fun Fact
- 2019 – Hush Writer
- 2018 – Big Blue
- 2017 – Big Duke
- 2002–2016 – Race not held
- 2001 – Sky Heights
- 2000 – Tie The Knot
- 1999 – Inshallah
- 1998 – Bridleman
- 1997 – Interval
- 1996 – Linesman
- 1995 – Beaux Art
- 1994 – Gold Sovereign
- 1993 – Te Akau Nick
- 1992 – Tuff Enuff
- 1991 – Castletown
- 1990 – Chaleyer
- 1989 – Tawrrific
- 1988 – Beau Zam
- 1987 – Argonaut Style
- 1986 – Handy Proverb
- 1985 – Duanettes Girl
- 1984 – Port Fair
- 1983 – Forward Charge
- 1982 – Gurner's Lane
- 1981 – November Rain
- 1980 – Shogun
- 1960–1979 – Race not held
- 1959 – Bardshah
- 1958 – Tulloch
- 1957 – Monte Carlo
- 1956 – Sailor's Guide
- 1955 – Pride Of Egypt
- 1954 – Monarch
- 1953 – Sea Sovereign
- 1952 – Hydrogen
- 1951 – Aristocrat
- 1950 – Playboy
- 1949 – Carbon Copy
- 1948 – Cronides
- 1947 – Vigaro
- 1946 – Gay Lad
- 1945 – Accession
- 1944 – Mayfowl
- 1943 – Modulation
- 1942 – Its Funny
- 1941 – Lucrative
- 1940 – Reading
- 1939 – Mosaic
- 1938 – John Wilkes
- 1937 – Gold Rod
- 1936 – Allunga
- 1935 – Sylvandale
- 1934 – Limarch
- 1933 – Peter Pan
- 1932 – Middle Watch
- 1931 – Veilmond
- 1930 – Phar Lap
- 1929 – Strephon
- 1928 – Winalot
- 1927 – Limerick
- 1926 – Belgamba
- 1925 – Windbag
- 1924 – Lady Valais
- 1923 – Sir Andrew
- 1922 – Harvest King
- 1921 – Salitros
- 1920 – Millieme
- 1919 – Finmark
- 1918 – Prince Viridis
- 1917 – Thana
- 1916 – Kandos
- 1915 – Mountain Knight
- 1914 – Radnor
- 1913 – Wolawa
- 1912 – Jacamar
- 1911 – Cadonia
- 1910 – Prince Foote
- 1909 – Lord Nolan
- 1908 – Mountain King
- 1907 – Poseidon
- 1906 – Lady Wallace
- 1905 – Dividend
- 1904 – Emir
- 1903 – Abundance
- 1902 – Sir Leonard
- 1901 – Clean Sweep
- 1900 – Parthian
- 1899 – Johansen
- 1898 – Amberite
- 1897 – Newhaven
- 1896 – Wallace
- 1895 – Cobbity
- 1894 – The Sailor Prince
- 1893 – Camoola
- 1892 – La Tosca
- 1891 – Correze
- 1890 – Dreadnought
- 1889 – Melos
- 1888 – Abercorn
- 1887 – Trident
- 1886 – Matchlock
- 1885 – Silver King
- 1884 – Legrand
- 1883 – Navigator
- 1882 – Wheatear
- 1881 – Progress
- 1880 – Petrea
- 1879 – Bosworth
- 1878 – Cap-A-Pie
- 1877 – Robinson Crusoe
- 1876 – Robin Hood
- 1875 – Kingsborough
- 1874 – Goldsbrough
- 1873 – Commodore
- 1872 – Hamlet
- 1871 – Lady Clifden
- 1870 – Moselle
- 1869 – Coquette
- 1868 – Glencoe
- 1867 – Fishhook
- 1866 – The Pitsford
- 1865 – Yattendon
- 1864 – Ramornie
- 1863 – Regno
- 1862 – Exeter
- 1861 – Alfred
- 1860 – Race not held
- 1859 – The Don
- 1858 – Chevalier
- 1857 – Lauristina
- 1856 – Stumpy
- 1855 – Bay Camden
- 1854 – Race not held
- 1853 – Cooramin
- 1852 – Surplice
- 1851 – Plover
- 1850 – Cossack
- 1849 – Pastile
- 1848 – Snake
- 1847 – Whalebone
- 1846 – Lady Theorem
- 1845 – Peter From Athlone
- 1844 – Blue Bonnet
- 1843 – Marchioness
- 1842 – Beeswing
- 1841 – Eleanor

== See also ==
- Angst Stakes
- The Everest
- King Charles III Stakes
- The Kosciuszko
- Reginald Allen Quality
- Sydney Stakes
- List of Australian Group races
