= C. B. Fisher Plate =

VRC C. B. Fisher Plate
- Location: Flemington Racecourse, Melbourne, Australia
- Distance: 2400 metres
- Surface: Turf

The VRC C. B. Fisher Plate was a weight-for-age thoroughbred horse race over 2400 metres (a mile and a half). It was run at Flemington Racecourse, Melbourne Australia on the Saturday after the Melbourne Cup in early November from 1870 until 1978. It is no longer held.

It was named after Charles Brown Fisher who was a noted horse breeder of the late 19th century.

Some notable winners were:

- 1908, 1909 & 1910 Alawa
- 1920 Eurythmic
- 1929 Amounis
- 1930 Phar Lap
- 1938 Ajax
- 1939, 1940 & 1941 High Caste, with Beau Vite the runner up in both 1940 and 1941. Beau Vite won the Cox Plate in 1940 and 1941.
- 1954 Rising Fast
- 1955 Rising Fast beating Ray Ribbon with 1957 Cox Plate winner Redcraze 3rd.
- 1957 Tulloch
- 1960 Tulloch
- 1962 Even Stevens
- 1966 Galilee with Tobin Bronze 2nd.
- 1974 Leilani, beating Gala Red with Battle Heights 3rd.
- 1977 Tom's Mate, with 1976 Melbourne Cup winner Van der Hum 2nd.
- 1978 Salamander
