= Poseidon (horse) =

Australian-bred Thoroughbred racehorse

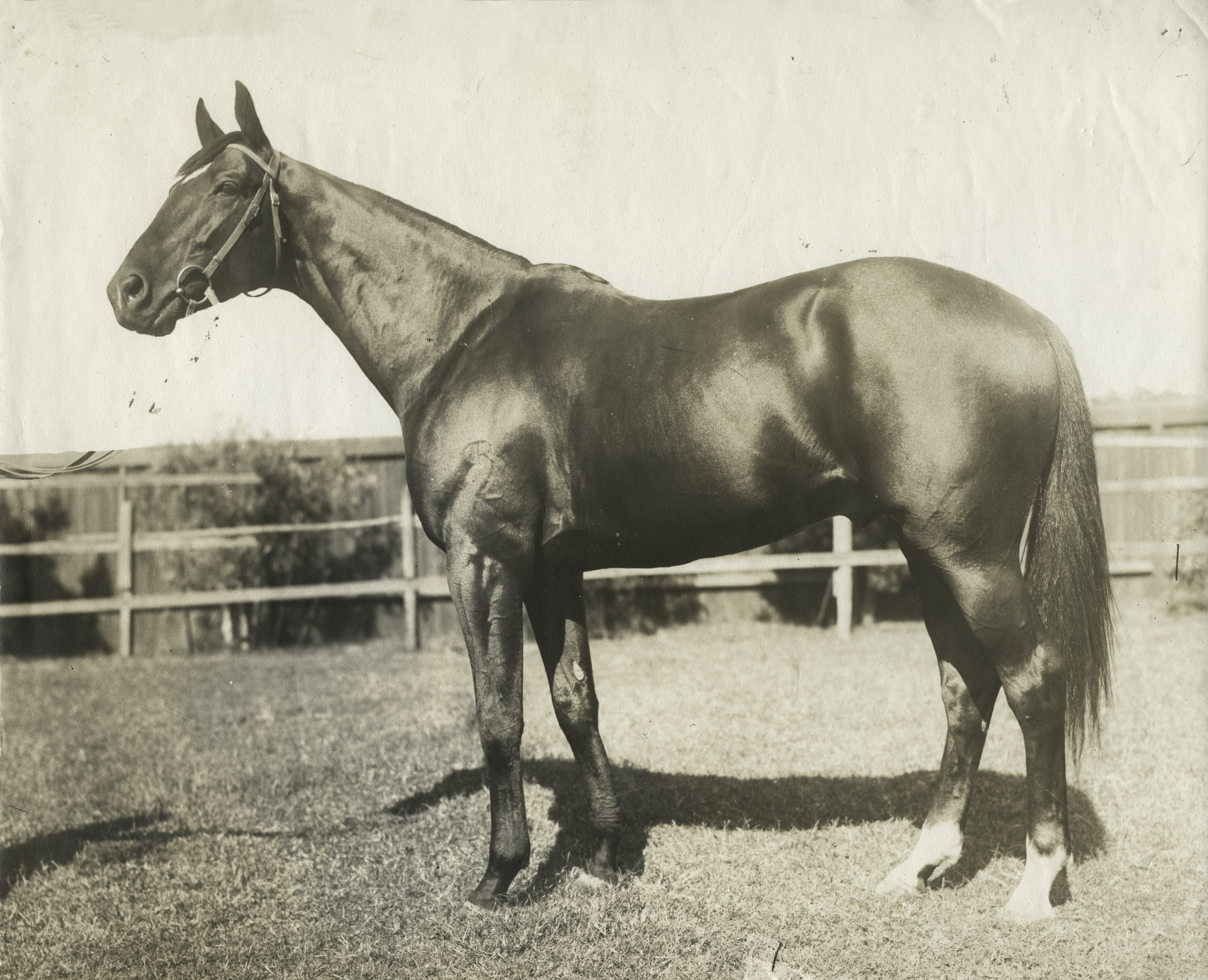
- Poseidon, 1906 Melbourne Cup winner
- Sire: Positano (GB)
- Dam: Jacinth
- Damsire: Martini-Henry (NZ)
- Sex: Stallion
- Foaled: 19 August 1903
- Died: 3 February 1930 (aged 26)
- Country: Australia
- Colour: Brown
- Breeder: Richard Halifax Dangar (Neotsfield Stud)
- Owner: Sir Hugh Denison
- Trainer: Isaac Earnshaw
- Record: 33: 19-4-3
- Earnings: £19,946

Major wins
- Melbourne Cup (1906); Caulfield Cup (1906, 1907); AJC Derby (1906); Victoria Derby (1906); VRC St Leger Stakes (1907); AJC St Leger (1907); AJC Spring Stakes (1907); Melbourne Stakes (1907); AJC Plate (1908); Rawson Stakes (1908)

Awards
- Australian Racing Hall of Fame (2004 inductee)

Honours
- VRC Poseidon Stakes
- Last updated on 12 March 2010

Poseidon (19 August 1903 - 3 February 1930) was an Australian Thoroughbred Hall of Fame racehorse. He won 19 races over distances ranging from five furlongs to three miles. Sixteen of these wins were "Principal Races" (equivalent to today's "Black Type" races), eight of them now of Group 1 (G1) status.

As a three-year-old in 1906/07, Poseidon had 14 starts for 11 wins, including the Caulfield Cup (in race record time), Melbourne Cup, Victoria Derby and AJC Derby. In achieving this, Poseidon became the first horse to complete the Caulfield Cup-Melbourne Cup double. In winning the Caulfield Cup again the following year, he also became the first horse to win consecutive Caulfield Cups.

== Early history ==
Poseidon was foaled on 19 August 1903 at R H Dangar's Neotsfield Stud in NSW. He was from the fifth crop of his sire Positano (GB) and was the fifth foal of his dam Jacinth, a daughter of Martini-Henry (NZ), winner of 1883 VRC Melbourne Cup. Positano, a son of the great St. Simon, was unplaced in his seven starts in England, although he was placed second in the Ascot Derby. After he was imported into Australia he won three races from 12 starts. Jacinth won five races and was the dam of 11 foals, seven of whom raced for five moderate winners, aside from Poseidon.

At the dispersal of the Neotsfield Stud, Poseidon was sold to the Moses brothers as a foal at foot with his dam for 400 guineas. The Moses brothers went on to establish the Arrowfield Stud near Singleton, NSW. Interested only in the dam and not the foal at foot, Poseidon was later sold to owner, Sir Hugh Denison for 500 guineas at the April 1905 Chisholm and Co Yearling Sales in Sydney.

== Racing career ==
Poseidon was trained by Isaac Earnshaw, and ridden throughout his career by Tom Clayton,

=== Season 1905/06 - two-year-old ===
Six starts: 1–0–1

Unplaced in his racing debut, Poseidon won at his second start as favourite by 4 lengths. Then sent to Melbourne, he had two starts but did not figure in the placings. Sent back to Sydney, Poseidon was off the board in the AJC Champagne Stakes. In his last two-year-old start he finished in a dead heat for third in the AJC Nursery Handicap, and was then sent out for a spell.

=== Season 1906/07 - three-year-old ===
14 starts: 11–3–0

Poseidon had an exemplary career as a three-year-old.

He began his three-year-old season with wins in two minor races, before winning the AJC Derby by three lengths, ahead of the two favourites. Just two days later, he raced against older competition for the first time in the AJC Metropolitan Handicap, finishing in second place to Solution (NZ).

Poseidon chalked up a string of wins in Melbourne. First came the VATC Eclipse Stakes in record time, then just two days later the Caulfield Cup in race record time, the VRC Victoria Derby, and finally the VRC Melbourne Cup.

After a spell over Christmas, Poseidon returned in the autumn and continued on his winning ways with wins in the VATC St Helier Stakes, VRC St Leger Stakes, and the VRC Loch Plate. He then finished second to Dividend in the three mile VRC Champion Stakes, before heading back to Sydney for the Autumn Racing Carnival.

In his two starts in the autumn, Poseidon won the AJC St Leger, but in his last start as a three-year-old, he finished second again to Dividend in the AJC Cumberland Stakes.

During his three-year-old season, Poseidon won approximately £12,000 in prize money.

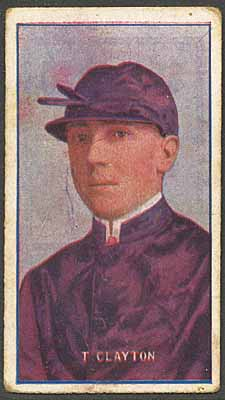
Tom Clayton - Poseidon's regular jockey

=== Season 1907/08 - four-year-old ===
Twelve starts: 7–1–2

Poseidon continued on his winning way as a four-year-old.

At his first start back in the Rawson Stakes he finished third, but won at his next start, in the WFA AJC Spring Stakes (12-fur) at Randwick ahead of stable mate Apologue. At his second start Poseidon disappointed his backers with a poor third in the AJC Craven Plate, after Antonius had cannoned into him mid-race and knocked the wind out of him.

Moving back down to Melbourne for the Spring Carnival, Poseidon returned to form, winning the WFA VATC Eclipse Stakes at Caulfield on 16 October 1907, the Wednesday before the Caulfield Cup.

There were 16 starters in the Caulfield Cup in 1907, and after the start he was dropped towards the rear of the field. Jockey Tom Clayton waited to the half mile then set off on Poseidon. Poseidon raced around the field and dashed clear with a winning break, the Cup in his keeping. He had become the first horse to win consecutive Caulfield Cups.

On Derby Day, as 1-3 favourite, Poseidon won again beating Apologue in the VRC Melbourne Stakes.

Next was the Melbourne Cup, but as a result of his Caulfield Cup win, Poseidon was given a 10 lb penalty, and had to carry 10 stone 3 pounds (65 kg). The weight told, and Poseidon finished in eighth place with the win going to Apologue who carried only 7 st 9 lb (49 kg).

Poseidon's return to the track in 1908 was delayed by a minor leg problem. He bypassed the Melbourne Autumn Carnival but in a shortened Sydney program, won three of his four starts. His only failure was a fourth place to Tartan in the AJC Autumn Stakes.

=== Season 1908/09 - five-year-old ===
One unplaced start.

Poseidon returned as a five-year-old for one last campaign. After finishing fifth in the RRC Rawson Stakes, he pulled up sore. As he would require a long spell away from the track to recover, the decision was made to retire Poseidon to stud duties.

== Race record ==
1905-06 season as a two-year-old
Result	Date	Race	Venue	Distance	Weight (st)	Time	Jockey	Winner/2nd
Unpl	01/01/1906	Tatts Club (NSW) Handicap	-	5½f	7.9	1:9	Tom Clayton	Barrenjoey 1st
Won	26/01/1906	AJC First Nursery Handicap	Randwick	5f	7.10	1:1.75	Tom Clayton	Roosevelt 2nd
Unpl	24/02/1906	VATC Alma Stakes	Caulfield	6f	8.5	1:15.5	Tom Clayton	Galeria 1st
Unpl	06/03/1906	VRC Junior Handicap	Flemington	6f	8.3	1:16.6	Tom Clayton	Melodrama 1st
Unpl	16/04/1906	AJC Champagne Stakes	Randwick	6f	8.10	1:16.25	Tom Clayton	Collarit 1st
3rd (DH)	21/04/1906	AJC Second Nursery Handicap	Randwick	6f	7.8	1:16.5	Tom Clayton	Melodrama 1st

1906-07 season as a three-year-old
Result	Date	Race	Venue	Distance	Weight (st)	Time	Jockey	Winner/2nd
Won	08/09/1906	Tatts Club (NSW) Welter Handicap	-	8f	8.2	1:41.25	Tom Clayton	Melodrama 2nd
Won	22/09/1906	Hawkesbury RC Spring Handicap	-	10f 100yds	7.10	2:15.25	Tom Clayton	Oak Grafton 2nd
Won	29/09/1906	AJC Derby	Randwick	12f	8.10	2:38	Tom Clayton	Collarit 2nd
2nd	01/10/1906	AJC Metropolitan Handicap	Randwick	12f	7.9	2:33.5	Tom Clayton	Solution 1st
Won	17/10/1906	VATC Eclipse Stakes (WFA)	Caulfield	11f	8.2	2:21.75 *R	Tom Clayton	Iolaire 2nd
Won	20/10/1906	VATC Caulfield Cup	Caulfield	12f	7.7	2:34.25 *RR	Tom Clayton	Simoda 2nd
Won	03/11/1906	VRC Derby	Flemington	12f	8.10	2:40.5	Tom Clayton	Antonious 2nd
Won	06/11/1906	VRC Melbourne Cup	Flemington	2m	7.6	3:31.5	Tom Clayton	Antonious 2nd
Won	23/02/1907	VATC St Helier Stakes	Caulfield	12f	8.8	2:39	Tom Clayton	Realm 2nd
Won	02/03/1907	VRC St Leger Stakes	Flemington	14f	8.10	3:11	Tom Clayton	Booran 2nd
Won	07/03/1907	VRC Loch Plate (WFA)	Flemington	2m	8.0	3:34.5	Tom Clayton	Dividend 2nd
2nd	09/03/1907	VRC Champion Stakes	Flemington	3m	7.12	5:29.5	Tom Clayton	Dividend 1st
Won	30/03/1907	AJC St Leger	Randwick	14f	8.10	3:22.25	Tom Clayton	Oakton 2nd
2nd	03/04/1907	AJC Cumberland Stakes (WFA)	Randwick	2m	8.2	3:31.5	Tom Clayton	Dividend 1st

1907-08 season as a four-year-old
Result	Date	Race	Venue	Distance	Weight (st)	Time	Jockey	Winner/2nd
3rd	14/09/1907	RRC Rawson Stakes	Rosehill	abt 9f	9.7	1:52.25	Tom Clayton	Mountain King 1st
Won	05/10/1907	AJC Spring Stakes (WFA)	Randwick	12f	9.0	2:34.25	Tom Clayton	Apologue 2nd
3rd	09/10/1907	AJC Craven Plate (WFA)	Randwick	10f	9.0	2:7.25	Tom Clayton	Mountain King 1st
Won	16/10/1907	VATC Eclipse Stakes (WFA)	Caulfield	11f	9.0	2:23.75	Tom Clayton	May King 2nd
Won	19/10/1907	VATC Caulfield Cup	Caulfield	12f	9.3	2:35.5	Tom Clayton	Apologue 2nd
Won	02/11/1907	VRC Melbourne Stakes (WFA)	Flemington	10f	9.0	2:12.25	Tom Clayton	Apologue 2nd
Unpl	05/11/1907	VRC Melbourne Cup	Flemington	2m	10.3	3:27.5	Tom Clayton	Apologue 1st
2nd	09/11/1907	VRC C B Fisher Plate (WFA)	Flemington	12f	9.0	2:40	Tom Clayton	Mountain King 1st
Won	04/04/1908	RRC Rawson Stakes	Rosehill	9f	9.7	1:55.5	Tom Clayton	Decollette 2nd
Unpl	18/04/1908	AJC Autumn Stakes (WFA)	Randwick	12f	9.0	2:39.5	Tom Clayton	Tartan 1st
Won	22/04/1908	AJC Cumberland Stakes (WFA)	Randwick	2m	9.0	3:34.5	Tom Clayton	Tartan 2nd
Won	25/04/1908	AJC Plate (WFA)	Randwick	3m	9.0	6:49.25	Tom Clayton	Tartan 2nd

1908-09 season as a five-year-old
Result	Date	Race	Venue	Distance	Weight (st)	Time	Jockey	Winner/2nd
Unpl	12/09/1908	RRC Rawson Stakes	Rosehill	9f	9.11	1:52.25	Tom Clayton	Perkeo 1st

== Stud record ==
Poseidon's owner had established the 'Eurmeralla Stud' at Gulgong, NSW, with a number of well-bred Australian and British mares to give Poseidon every chance of success as a sire.

His best performers were the "Principal Race" winners:

- Rascasse

- 1915 QTC Queensland Derby

- Telecles

- 1918 WmtnRC Australia Day Cup
- 1919 MVRC Moonee Valley Cup

Poseidon died on 3 February 1930 at 26 years of age. Each year the Listed VRC Poseidon Stakes for three-year-old colts and geldings is run in his honour.

== Pedigree ==
Pedigree of Poseidon (10) Br. h. 1903
Sire Positano (GB) 1893	St Simon (GB); 1881	Galopin (GB)	Vedette (GB)
Sire Positano (GB) 1893	St Simon (GB); 1881	Galopin (GB)	Flying Duchess (GB)
Sire Positano (GB) 1893	St Simon (GB); 1881	St Angela (GB)	King Tom (GB)
Sire Positano (GB) 1893	St Simon (GB); 1881	St Angela (GB)	Adeline (GB)
Sire Positano (GB) 1893	Ponza (GB); 1887	Springfield (GB)	St Albans (GB)
Sire Positano (GB) 1893	Ponza (GB); 1887	Springfield (GB)	Viridis (GB)
Sire Positano (GB) 1893	Ponza (GB); 1887	Napoli (GB)	Macaroni (GB)
Sire Positano (GB) 1893	Ponza (GB); 1887	Napoli (GB)	Sunshine (GB)
Dam Jacinth (Aus) 1894	Martini-Henry (NZ); 1880	Musket (GB)	Toxophilite (GB)
Dam Jacinth (Aus) 1894	Martini-Henry (NZ); 1880	Musket (GB)	West Australian mare (GB)
Dam Jacinth (Aus) 1894	Martini-Henry (NZ); 1880	Sylvia (Aus)	Fisherman*^ (GB)
Dam Jacinth (Aus) 1894	Martini-Henry (NZ); 1880	Sylvia (Aus)	Juliet (GB)
Dam Jacinth (Aus) 1894	Iantha (Aus); 1886	Chester (Aus)	Yattendon (Aus)
Dam Jacinth (Aus) 1894	Iantha (Aus); 1886	Chester (Aus)	Lady Chester (GB)
Dam Jacinth (Aus) 1894	Iantha (Aus); 1886	Iolanthe (Aus)	Maribyrnong^ (Aus)
Dam Jacinth (Aus) 1894	Iantha (Aus); 1886	Iolanthe (Aus)	Rosedale (GB) (Family: 10-d)

*^ Poseidon is inbred 4D x 5D to the stallion Fisherman, meaning that he appears fourth generation and fifth generation (via Maribyrnong)^ on the dam side of his pedigree.

== See also ==
- List of leading Thoroughbred racehorses

== Sources ==
Australia's Champion Racehorses. Federal Publishing Company.
