= Clarissimus (horse) =

British-bred Thoroughbred racehorse

- Sire: Radium
- Grandsire: Bend Or
- Dam: Quintessence
- Damsire: St Frusquin
- Sex: Stallion
- Foaled: 1913
- Country: United Kingdom
- Colour: Chestnut
- Breeder: Evelyn Boscawen, 7th Viscount Falmouth
- Owner: 7th Viscount Falmouth
- Trainer: William Waugh
- Record: 6: 3-2-0

Major wins
- Clearwell Stakes (1915); 2000 Guineas (1916); Champion Stakes (1916)

Clarissimus (1913 – 6 July 1933) was a British Thoroughbred racehorse and sire. He was highly rated as a juvenile and showed promise by winning the Clearwell Stakes on the second of his two starts. He recorded his biggest when winning the 2000 Guineas on his debut as a three-year-old. Clarissimus went on to finish second in the Newmarket Stakes and a substitute St Leger before winning the Champion Stakes on his final appearance. After his retirement from racing he became a breeding stallion and had considerable influence as a sire of broodmares.

== Background ==
Clarissimus was a chestnut horse bred in the United Kingdom by his owner Evelyn Boscawen, 7th Viscount Falmouth. He was foaled on 15 January 1913. The colt was sent into training with William Waugh at the Kingsclere stable in Berkshire.

He was probably the best horse sired by Radium, a slow-maturing stayer whose wins included the Jockey Club Cup, Goodwood Cup and Doncaster Cup. The most notable of Radium's other progeny was Night Raid, who was exported to Australia where he sired Phar Lap and Nightmarch. Clarissimus' dam Quintessence was an unbeaten mare whose six wins included the 1000 Guineas in 1903.

Clarissimus's racing career took place during World War I. Many racecourses were closed for the duration of the conflict and all five of traditional British Classic Races were run at Newmarket.

== Racing career ==
=== 1915: two-year-old season ===
Clarissimus showed very promising form on the training gallops and was highly regarded by his trainer, but on his racecourse debut he was well beaten by the fillies Telephone Girl and Fifinella in the Bibury Stakes ant Newmarket. At the same track in October he recorded his first success in the Clearwell Stakes.

=== 1916: three-year-old season ===
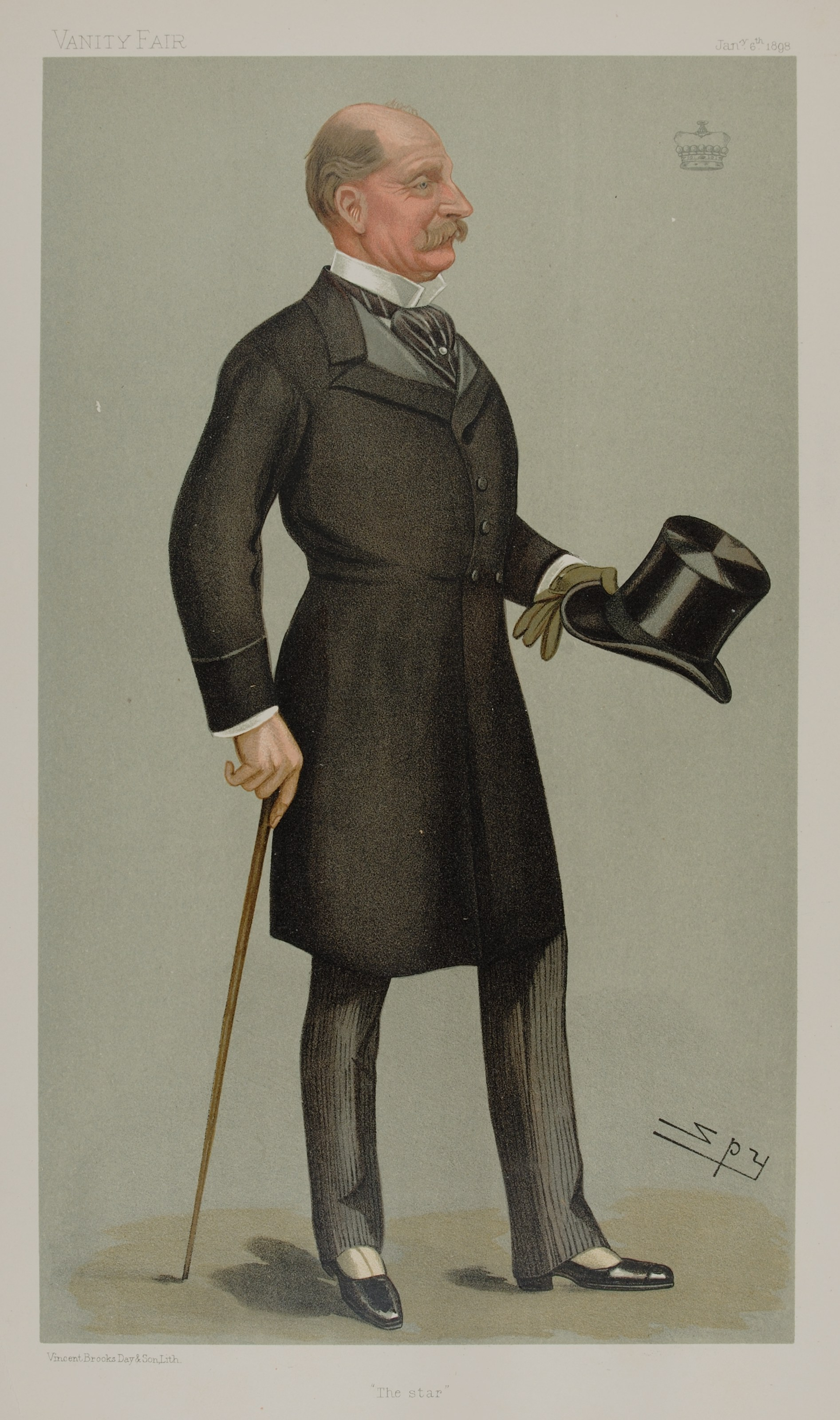
Clarissimus' owner 7th Viscount Falmouth

Clarissimus performed well in training in the spring of 1916 although his trainer's confidence was somewhat dented when his galloping companion, a filly named Angelina, ran poorly in the Greenham Stakes. On 3 May Clarissimus, ridden by Jimmy Clark, started at odds of 100/7 (approximately 14/1) for the 108th running of the 2000 Guineas over the Rowley Mile course at Newmarket. The race was run in "hazy" conditions and the early stages were not clearly visible from the stands although it was clear that the horses had split into two groups on either side of the wide straight. When the field emerged into clear view Clarissimus was towards the front of the group on the stands-side and won "pretty comfortably" by three quarters of a length from Kwang-Su with Nassovian half a length away in third place. The favourite Figaro, who raced up the opposite side of the track, finished fourth of the seventeen runners.

In the Newmarket Stakes over ten furlongs on 17 May, Clarissimus was beaten half a length by Figaro. He had a particularly bad race and did not recover sufficiently to take part in the "New Derby".

After a break of almost four months, Clarissimus returned for the September Stakes at Newmarket, a substitute race for the St Leger. He proved to be no match for the favourite Hurry On but took second place, five lengths clear of Atheling in third place.

In October the colt was matched against older horses in the Champion Stakes and started the 6/4 favourite after the late withdrawal of Pommern. Ridden by the Australian jockey Frank Bullock, he had "no difficulty" in winning from the four-year-old filly Silver Tag.

== Assessment and honours ==
In their book, A Century of Champions, based on the Timeform rating system, John Randall and Tony Morris rated Clarissimus an "average" winner of the 2000 Guineas.

== Stud record ==
At the end of his racing career Clarissimus was retired to become a breeding stallion in England where he stood for three years before being exported to France in 1921. Although his offspring in England had little success on the track his daughters had considerable success as broodmares. He was the damsire of Pharis, Brantome, Donatello (sire of Crepello and Alycidon) and Crudité (Grand Prix de Paris). His last foals were born in 1934. Clarissimus died of a stroke on 6 July 1933 at the Haras de Jardy. Purses won by his descendants exceeded $8,500,000 francs in flat racing and approached $3,000,000 francs in steeple-chasing. French offspring included Prix du President de la Republique winners Nino and Feb.

== Pedigree ==
Pedigree of Clarissimus (GB), chestnut stallion, 1913
Sire Radium (GB) 1903	Bend Or; 1877	Doncaster	Stockwell
Sire Radium (GB) 1903	Bend Or; 1877	Doncaster	Marigold
Sire Radium (GB) 1903	Bend Or; 1877	Rouge Rose	Thormanby
Sire Radium (GB) 1903	Bend Or; 1877	Rouge Rose	Ellen Horne
Sire Radium (GB) 1903	Taia; 1892	Donovan	Galopin
Sire Radium (GB) 1903	Taia; 1892	Donovan	Mowerina
Sire Radium (GB) 1903	Taia; 1892	Eira	Kisber
Sire Radium (GB) 1903	Taia; 1892	Eira	Aeolia
Dam Quintessence (GB) 1900	St Frusquin; 1893	St Simon	Galopin
Dam Quintessence (GB) 1900	St Frusquin; 1893	St Simon	St Angela
Dam Quintessence (GB) 1900	St Frusquin; 1893	Isabel	Plebeian
Dam Quintessence (GB) 1900	St Frusquin; 1893	Isabel	Parma
Dam Quintessence (GB) 1900	Margarine; 1887	Petrarch	Lord Clifden
Dam Quintessence (GB) 1900	Margarine; 1887	Petrarch	Laura
Dam Quintessence (GB) 1900	Margarine; 1887	Maragarita	The Duke
Dam Quintessence (GB) 1900	Margarine; 1887	Maragarita	Tasmania (Family: 2-s)

- Clarissimus was inbred 4 × 4 to Galopin, meaning that this stallion appears twice in the fourth generation of his pedigree.
