= Phar Lap =

New Zealand-bred Thoroughbred racehorse (1926–1932)

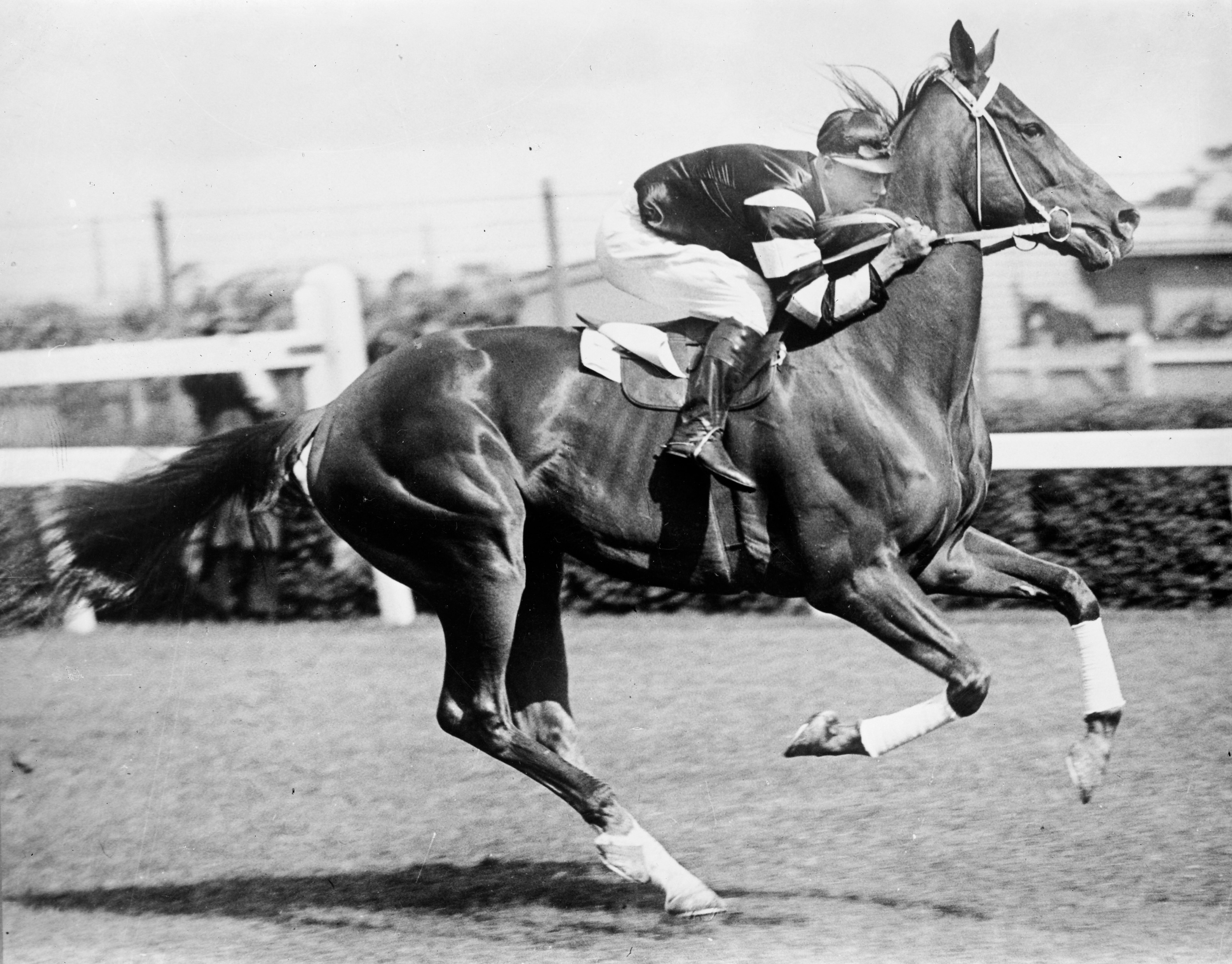
- Phar Lap and jockey Jim Pike at Flemington Racecourse, 1930
- Sire: Night Raid (GB)
- Grandsire: Radium (GB)
- Dam: Entreaty (NZ)
- Damsire: Winkie (GB)
- Sex: Gelding
- Foaled: 4 October 1926 near Timaru, New Zealand
- Died: 5 April 1932 (aged 5); Menlo Park, California, U.S.
- Country: New Zealand
- Colour: Chestnut
- Breeder: Alick Roberts
- Owner: David Davis and Harry Telford
- Trainer: Harry Telford
- Record: 51:37–3–2
- Earnings: £A66,738

Major wins
- Rosehill Guineas (1929); AJC Derby (1929); Craven Plate (1929, 1930, 1931); Victoria Derby (1929); AJC St Leger (1930); VRC St Leger (1930); Chipping Norton Stakes (1930); AJC Plate (1930); Chelmsford Stakes (1930); Hill Stakes (1930, 1931); W. S. Cox Plate (1930, 1931); Melbourne Stakes (1930, 1931); Melbourne Cup (1930); Linlithgow Stakes (1930); C.B. Fisher Plate (1930); St George Stakes (1931); Futurity Stakes (1931); Underwood Stakes (1931); Memsie Stakes (1931); Agua Caliente Handicap (1932)

Honours
- #22 – Top 100 U.S. Racehorses of the 20th Century; 1983 Motion Picture – Phar Lap: Heart of a Nation; Australian Racing Hall of Fame; New Zealand Racing Hall of Fame; Phar Lap Stakes run at Rosehill Racecourse
- Last updated on 29 April 2009

Phar Lap (4 October 1926 – 5 April 1932) was a New Zealand–born champion Australian Thoroughbred racehorse. Achieving great success during his distinguished career, his initial underdog status gave people hope during the early years of the Great Depression. He won the Melbourne Cup, two Cox Plates, the Australian Derby, and 19 other weight-for-age races. He is considered one of the greatest race horses of all time.

One of his greatest performances was winning the Agua Caliente Handicap in Mexico in track-record time in his final race. He won in a different country, after a bad start many lengths behind the leaders, with no training before the race, and he split his hoof during the race.

After a sudden and mysterious illness, Phar Lap died in 1932 in Menlo Park, California. At the time, he was the third-highest stakes-winner in the world. His mounted hide is displayed at the Melbourne Museum, his skeleton at the Museum of New Zealand, and his heart at the National Museum of Australia.

== Name ==
The name Phar Lap derives from the common Zhuang and Thai word for lightning: ฟ้าแลบ [fáː lɛ̂p], literally 'sky flash'.

Phar Lap was called "The Wonder Horse," "The Red Terror," and "Big Red" (the latter nickname was also given to two of the greatest United States racehorses, Man o' War and Secretariat). He was affectionately known as "Bobby" to his strapper Tommy Woodcock. He was also sometimes referred to as "Australia's Wonder Horse."

According to the Museum of Victoria, Aubrey Ping, a medical student at the University of Sydney, suggested "Farlap" as the horse's name. Ping knew the word from his father, a Zhuang-speaking Chinese immigrant. Phar Lap's trainer Harry Telford liked the name, but changed the F to PH to create a seven letter word, which was split in two in keeping with the dominant naming pattern of Melbourne Cup winners.

== Early life ==
A chestnut gelding, Phar Lap was foaled on 4 October 1926 in Seadown near Timaru in the South Island of New Zealand. He was sired by Night Raid from Entreaty by Winkie. He was by the same sire as the Melbourne Cup winner Nightmarch. Phar Lap was a brother to seven other horses, Fortune's Wheel, Nea Lap (won 5 races), Nightguard, All Clear, Friday Night, Te Uira and Raphis, none of which won a principal (stakes) race. He was a half-brother to another four horses, only two of which were able to win any races at all.

Sydney trainer Harry Telford persuaded American businessman David J. Davis to buy the colt at auction, based on his pedigree. Telford's brother Hugh, who lived in New Zealand, was asked to bid up to 190 guineas at the 1928 Trentham Yearling Sales. When the horse was obtained for a mere 160 guineas, he thought it was a great bargain until the colt arrived in Australia. The horse was gangly, his face was covered with warts, and he had an awkward gait. Davis was furious when he saw the colt as well, and refused to pay to train the horse. Telford had not been particularly successful as a trainer, and Davis was one of his few remaining owners. To placate Davis, he agreed to train the horse for nothing, in exchange for a two-thirds share of any winnings. Telford leased the horse for three years and was eventually sold joint ownership by Davis.

Although standing a winning racehorse at stud could be quite lucrative, Telford gelded Phar Lap anyway, hoping the colt would concentrate on racing.

== Racing career ==
Phar Lap finished last in the first race and did not place in his next three races. He won his first race on 27 April 1929, the Maiden Juvenile Handicap at Rosehill, ridden by Jack Baker of Armidale, a 17-year-old apprentice. He didn't race for several months but was then entered in a series of races, in which he moved up in class. Phar Lap took second in the Chelmsford Stakes at Randwick on 14 September 1929, and the racing community started treating him with respect. He won the Rosehill Guineas by three lengths on 21 September 1929, ridden by James L. Munro.

As his achievements grew, there were some who tried to halt his progress. Criminals tried to shoot Phar Lap on the morning of Saturday 1 November 1930 after he had finished track work. They missed, and later that day he won the Melbourne Stakes, and three days later the Melbourne Cup as odds-on favourite at 8 to 11.

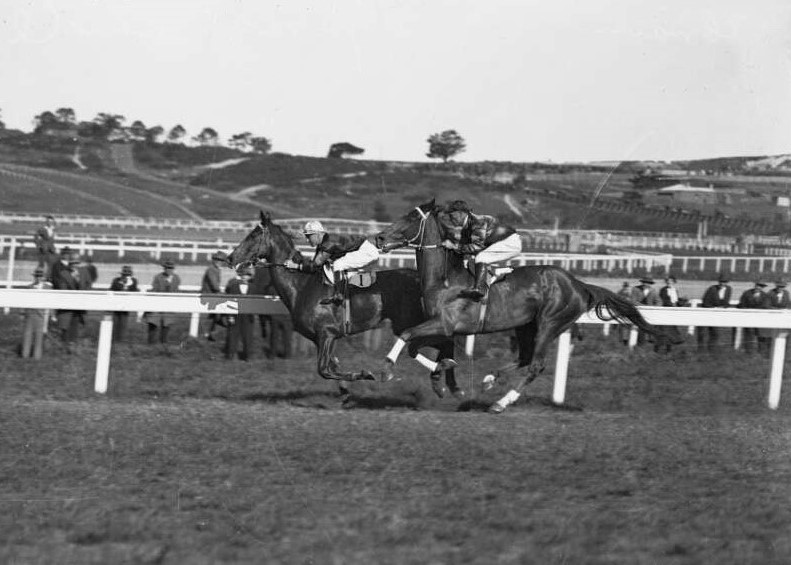
Phar Lap Jim Pike and Chide W.Cook Randwick Racecourse 1931

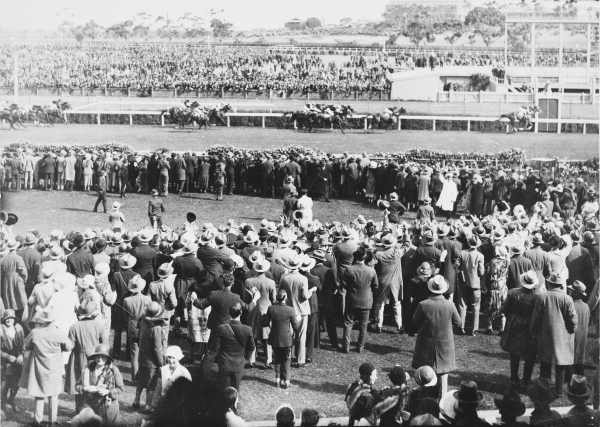
Phar Lap winning the Melbourne Cup Race from Second Wind and Shadow King on 4 November 1930

In the four years of his racing career, Phar Lap won 37 of 51 races he entered, including the Melbourne Cup, being ridden by Jim Pike, in 1930 with 9 st 12 lb (138 pounds (63 kg)). In that year and 1931, he won 14 races in a row. From his win as a three-year-old in the VRC St. Leger Stakes until his final race in Mexico, Phar Lap won 32 of 35 races. In the three races that he did not win, he ran second on two occasions, beaten by a short head and a neck, and in the 1931 Melbourne Cup he finished eighth when carrying 10 st 10 lb (150 pounds (68 kg)).

Phar Lap at the time was owned by American businessman David J. Davis and leased to Telford. After their three-year lease agreement ended, Telford had enough money to become joint owner of the horse. Davis then had Phar Lap shipped to North America to race. Telford did not agree with this decision and refused to go, so Davis, who along with his wife traveled to Mexico with him, brought Phar Lap's strapper Tommy Woodcock as his new trainer. Phar Lap was shipped by boat to Agua Caliente Racetrack near Tijuana, Mexico, to compete in the Agua Caliente Handicap, which was offering the largest prize money ever offered in North America racing. Phar Lap won in track-record time while carrying 129 pounds (58.5 kg). The horse was ridden by Australian jockey Billy Elliot for his seventh win from seven rides. From there, the horse was sent to a private ranch near Menlo Park, California, while his owner negotiated with racetrack officials for special race appearances.

== Death ==
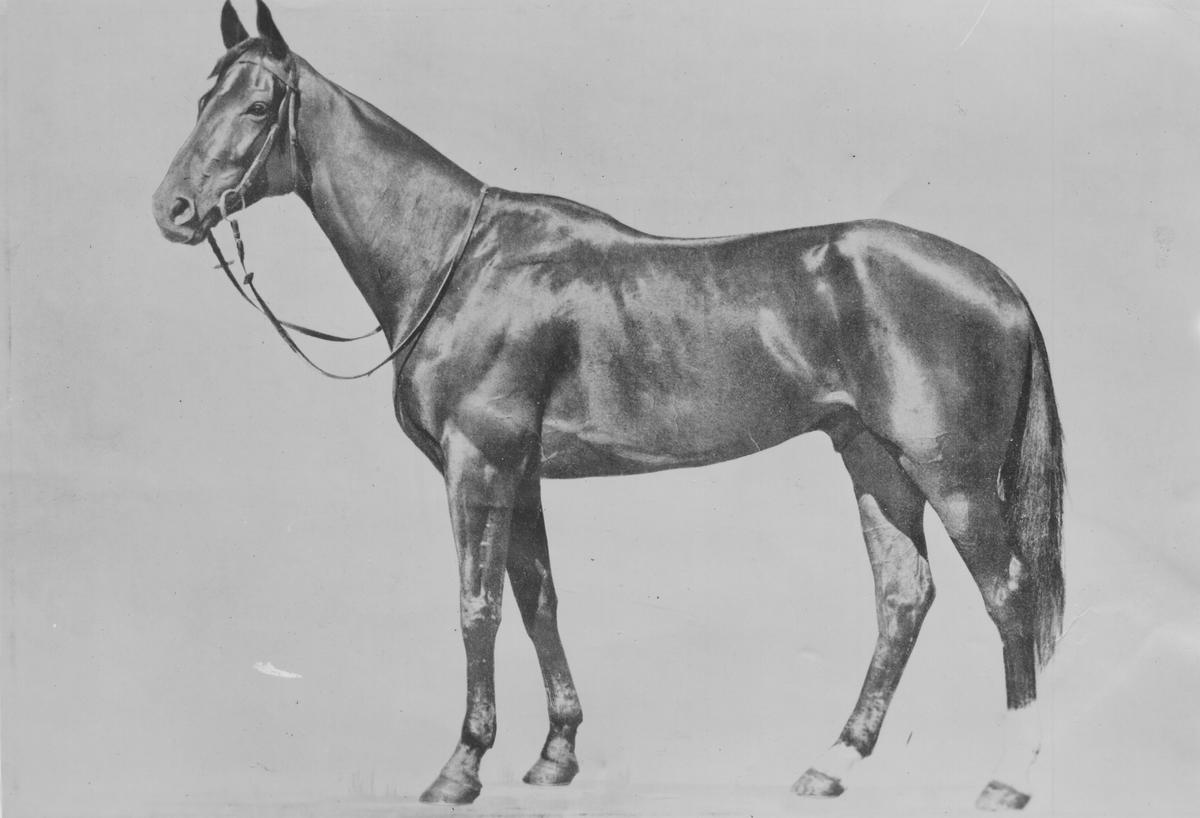
Phar Lap photographed c.1932

Early on 5 April 1932, the horse's strapper for the North American visit, Tommy Woodcock, found him in severe pain and with a high temperature. Within a few hours, Phar Lap haemorrhaged to death. An autopsy revealed that the horse's stomach and intestines were inflamed, leading many to believe the horse had been deliberately poisoned. There have been alternative theories, including accidental poisoning from lead insecticide and a stomach condition. It was not until the 1980s that the infection could be formally identified.

In 2000, equine specialists studying the two necropsies concluded that Phar Lap probably died of duodenitis-proximal jejunitis, an acute bacterial gastroenteritis.

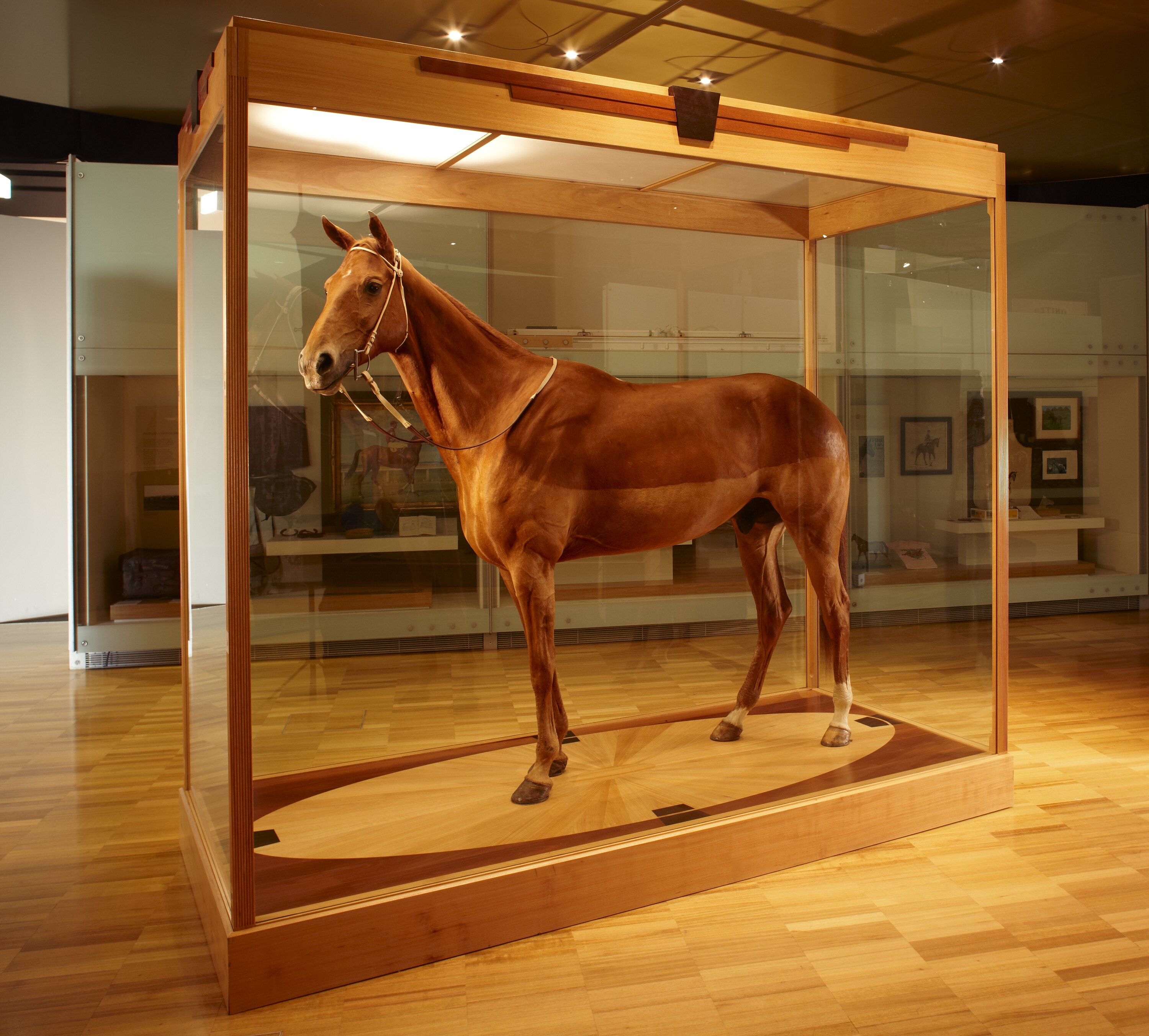
Phar Lap's skin was preserved by Louis Paul Jonas and is now exhibited as a taxidermy mount by Melbourne Museum.

In 2006, Australian Synchrotron research scientists said it was almost certain Phar Lap was poisoned with a large single dose of arsenic in the hours before he died, perhaps supporting the theory that Phar Lap was killed on the orders of US gangsters, who feared the Melbourne Cup-winning champion would inflict big losses on their illegal bookmakers. No evidence of involvement by a criminal element exists, however.

Sydney veterinarian Percy Sykes believes deliberate poisoning did not cause the death. He said "In those days, arsenic was quite a common tonic, usually given in the form of a solution (Fowler's Solution)", and suggests this was the cause of the high levels. "It was so common that I'd reckon 90 percent of the horses had arsenic in their system."

In December 2007, Phar Lap's mane was tested for multiple doses of arsenic which, if found, would point to accidental poisoning.

In April 2008, an 82-page handwritten notebook belonging to Telford and containing recipes for tonics given to Phar Lap in the days before swabbing was sold by a Melbourne auction house. It showed that Phar Lap was given tonics designed to boost his performance that included arsenic, strychnine, cocaine and caffeine. The find gave credence to Woodcock's deathbed admission in 1985 that Phar Lap may have been given an overdose of a tonic before the horse died in 1932. The notebook was sold to the Melbourne Museum for $37,000.

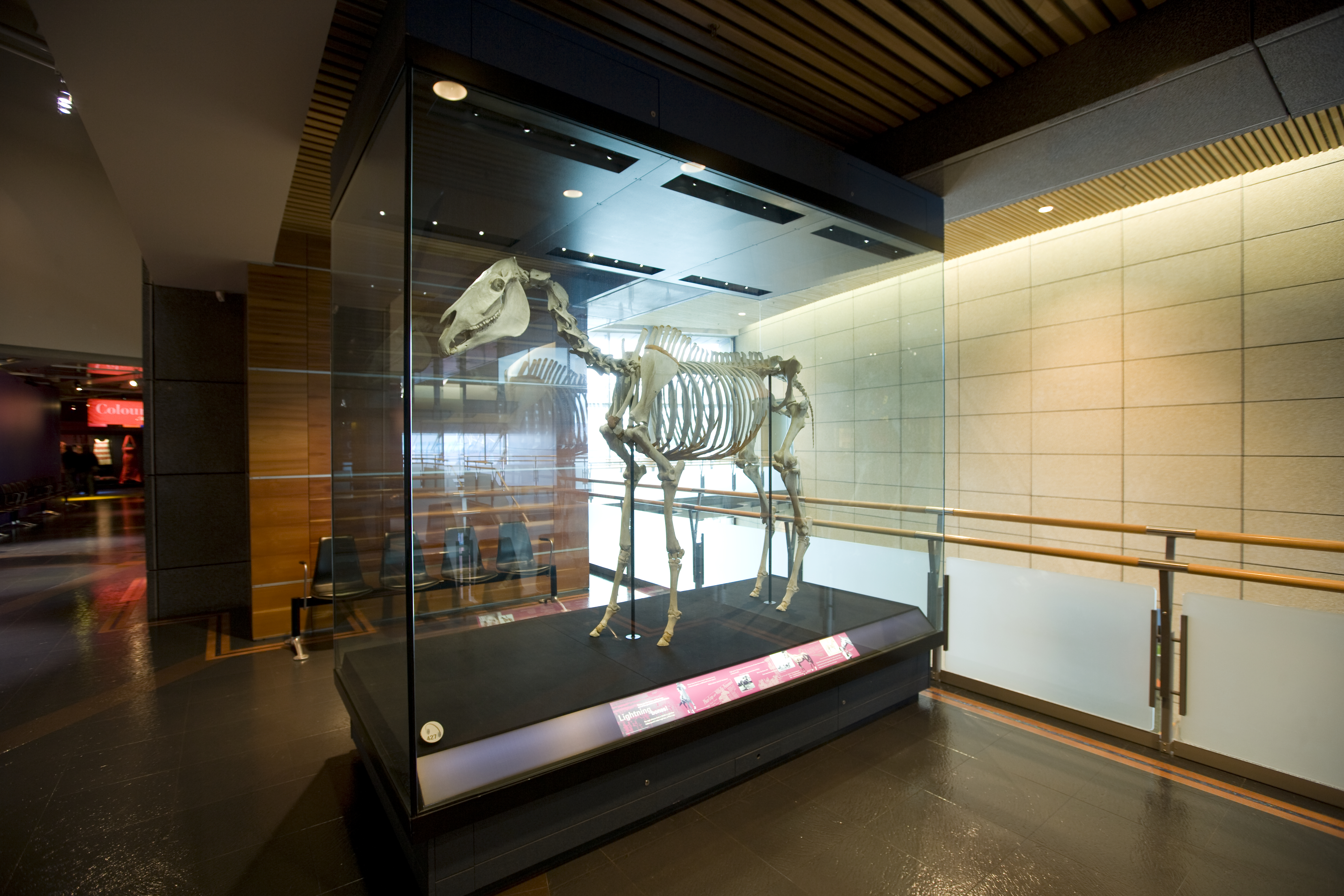
Skeleton in Te Papa

On 19 June 2008, the Melbourne Museum released the findings of the forensic investigation conducted by Ivan Kempson, University of South Australia, and Dermot Henry, Natural Science Collections at Museum Victoria. Kempson analysed six hairs from Phar Lap's mane at the Advanced Photon Source at Argonne National Laboratory near Chicago. These high resolution X-rays detect arsenic in hair samples, showing the specific difference "between arsenic, which had entered the hair cells via the blood and arsenic which had infused the hair cells by the taxidermy process when he was stuffed and mounted at the museum".

Kempson and Henry discovered that in the 30 to 40 hours before Phar Lap's death, the horse ingested a massive dose of arsenic. "We can't speculate where the arsenic came from, but it was easily accessible at the time", Henry said.

In October 2011 the Sydney Morning Herald published an article in which a New Zealand physicist and information from Phar Lap's strapper state that the great horse was never given any tonic with arsenic and that he died of an infection. Said Putt, "Unless we are prepared to say that Tommy Woodcock was a downright liar, which even today, decades after the loveable and respected horseman's death, would ostracise us with the Australian racing public, we must accept him on his word. The ineluctable conclusion we are left with, whether we like it or not, is that Phar Lap's impeccable achievements here and overseas were utterly tonic, stimulant, and drug-free."

Contradicting this is the tonic book of Harry Telford, Phar Lap's owner and trainer, on display in Museum Victoria, Melbourne. One recipe for a "general tonic" has a main ingredient of arsenic and has written below it: "A great tonic for all horses".

== Legacy ==
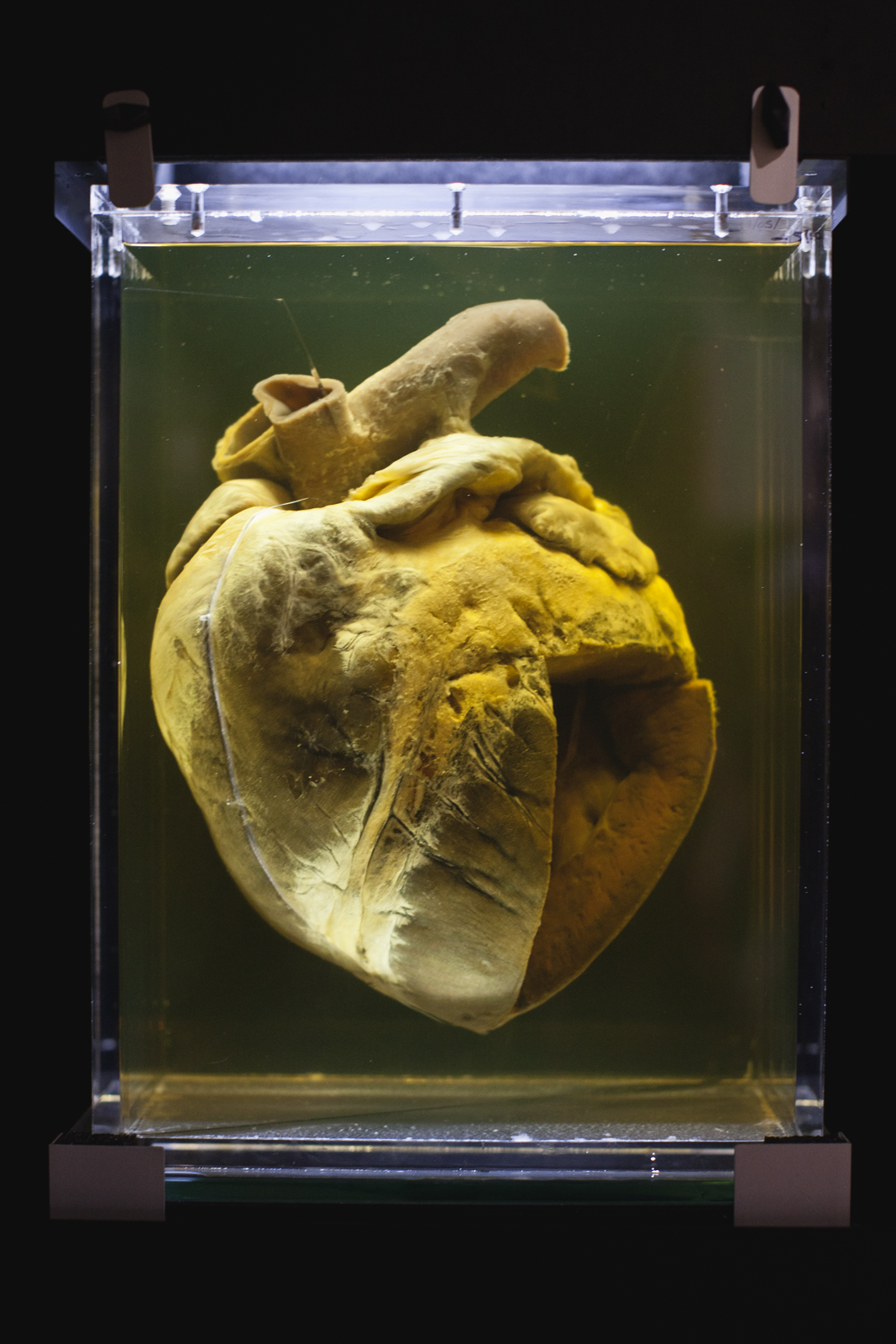
Phar Lap's heart at the National Museum of Australia. It was formerly held by the Institute of Anatomy in Canberra.

Following his death, Phar Lap's heart was donated to the Institute of Anatomy in Canberra and his skeleton to the New Zealand's National Museum in Wellington. After preparations of the hide by New York City taxidermist Louis Paul Jonas, Phar Lap's stuffed body was placed in the Australia Gallery at Melbourne Museum. The hide and the skeleton were put on exhibition together when Museum of New Zealand Te Papa Tongarewa lent the skeleton to the Melbourne Museum in September 2010 as part of celebrations for the 150th running of the 2010 Melbourne Cup.

Phar Lap's heart was remarkable for its size, weighing 6.2 kilograms (14 lb), compared with a normal horse's heart at 3.2 kilograms (7.1 lb). Now held at the National Museum of Australia in Canberra, it is the object visitors most often request to see. The author and film maker Peter Luck was convinced the heart is a fake. In Luck's 1979 television series This Fabulous Century, the daughter of Walker Neilson, the government veterinarian who performed the first post-mortem on Phar Lap, says her father told her the heart was necessarily cut to pieces during the autopsy, and the heart on display is that of a draughthorse. However the expression "a heart as big as Phar Lap" to describe a very generous or courageous person became a popular idiom.

Several books and films have featured Phar Lap, including the 1983 film Phar Lap, and the song "Phar Lap—Farewell To You", and the 2025 musical Phar Lap: The Electro-Swing Musical. His story was fictionalised in the 1934 film A Ticket in Tatts and the 1936 film Thoroughbred.

Phar Lap was one of five inaugural inductees into both the Australian Racing Hall of Fame and New Zealand Racing Hall of Fame. In the Blood-Horse magazine ranking of the Top 100 U.S. Thoroughbred champions of the 20th century, Phar Lap was ranked No. 22.

The horse is considered to be a national icon in both Australia and New Zealand. In 1978 he was honoured on a postage stamp issued by Australia Post and features in the Australian citizenship test.

Phar Lap has been honoured with a $500,000 life-sized bronze memorial near his birthplace in Timaru, New Zealand, that was unveiled on 25 November 2009. The statue is located at the entrance to Phar Lap Raceway in Washdyke. There is also a life-sized bronze statue at Flemington Racecourse in Melbourne.

Phar Lap has several residential streets named after him in Australia, New Zealand, and the United States. (In many cases, the name is merged into a single word "Pharlap".)

In 1931, Gilbert Percy Whitley, an ichthyologist at the Australian Museum, proposed a new genus of seahorse, Farlapiscis, named after Phar Lap. Farlapiscis was subsequently categorised as a junior synonym of the genus Hippocampus.

== 1930 racebook ==
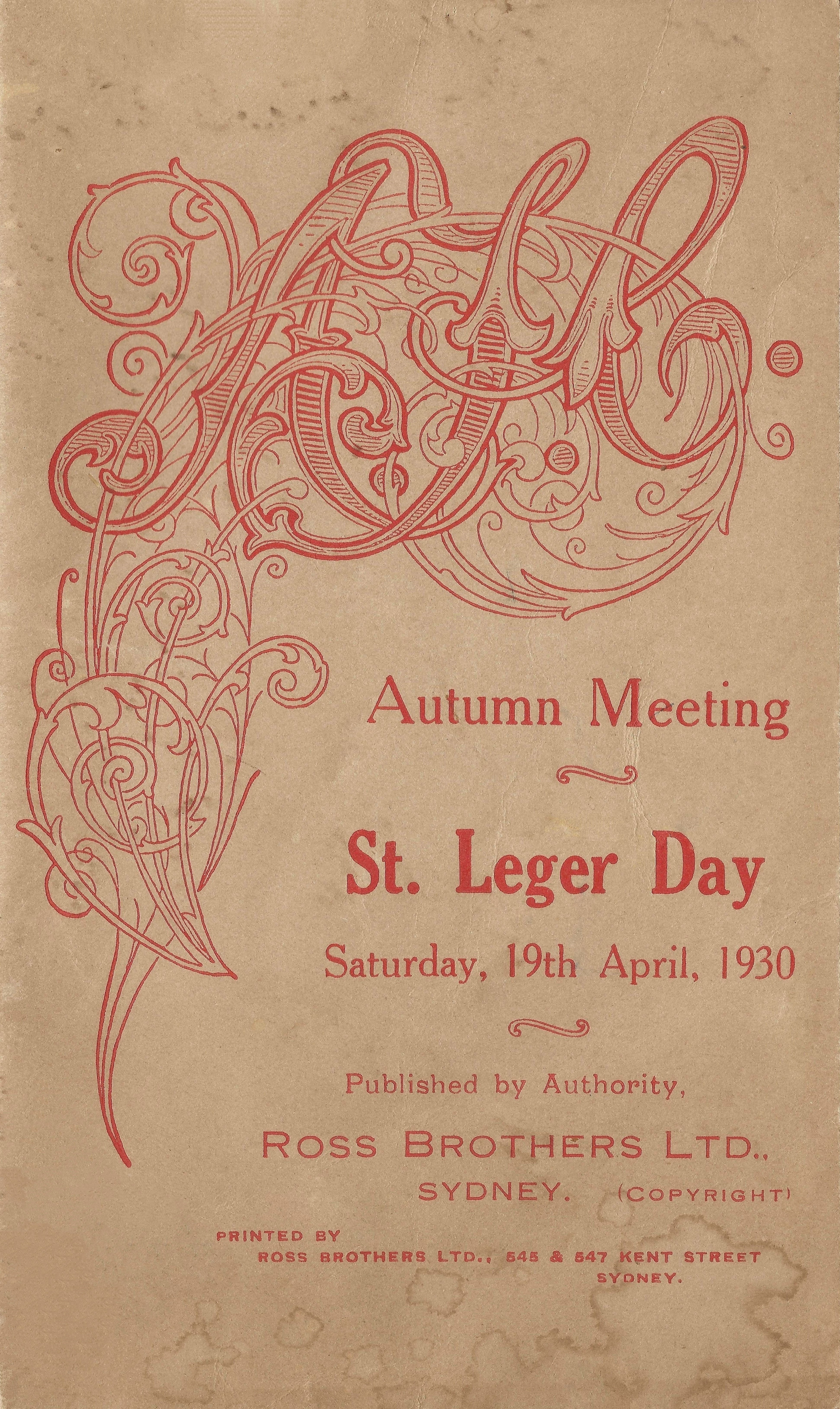
1930 AJC St Leger racebook front cover

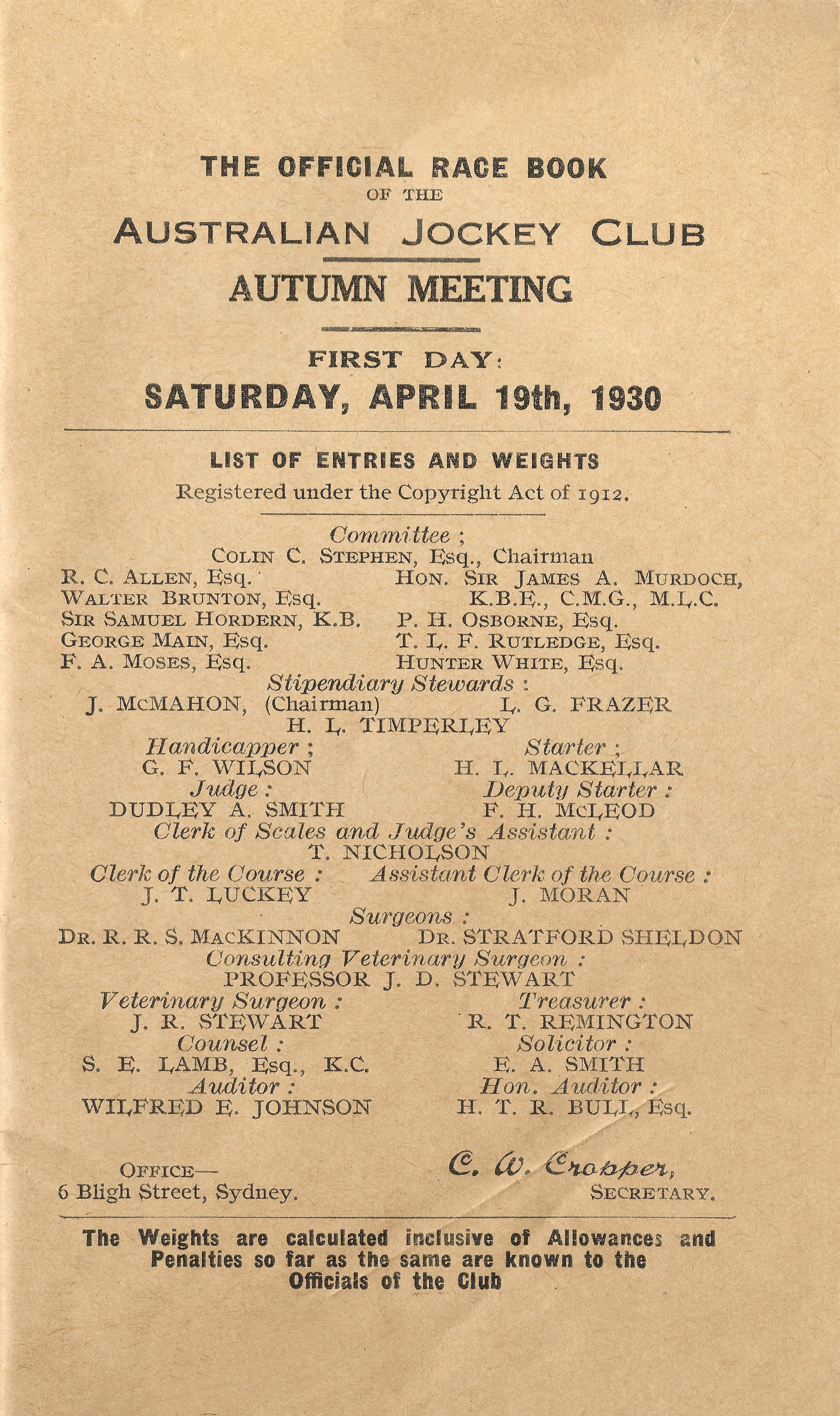
1930 AJC St Leger showing raceday officials

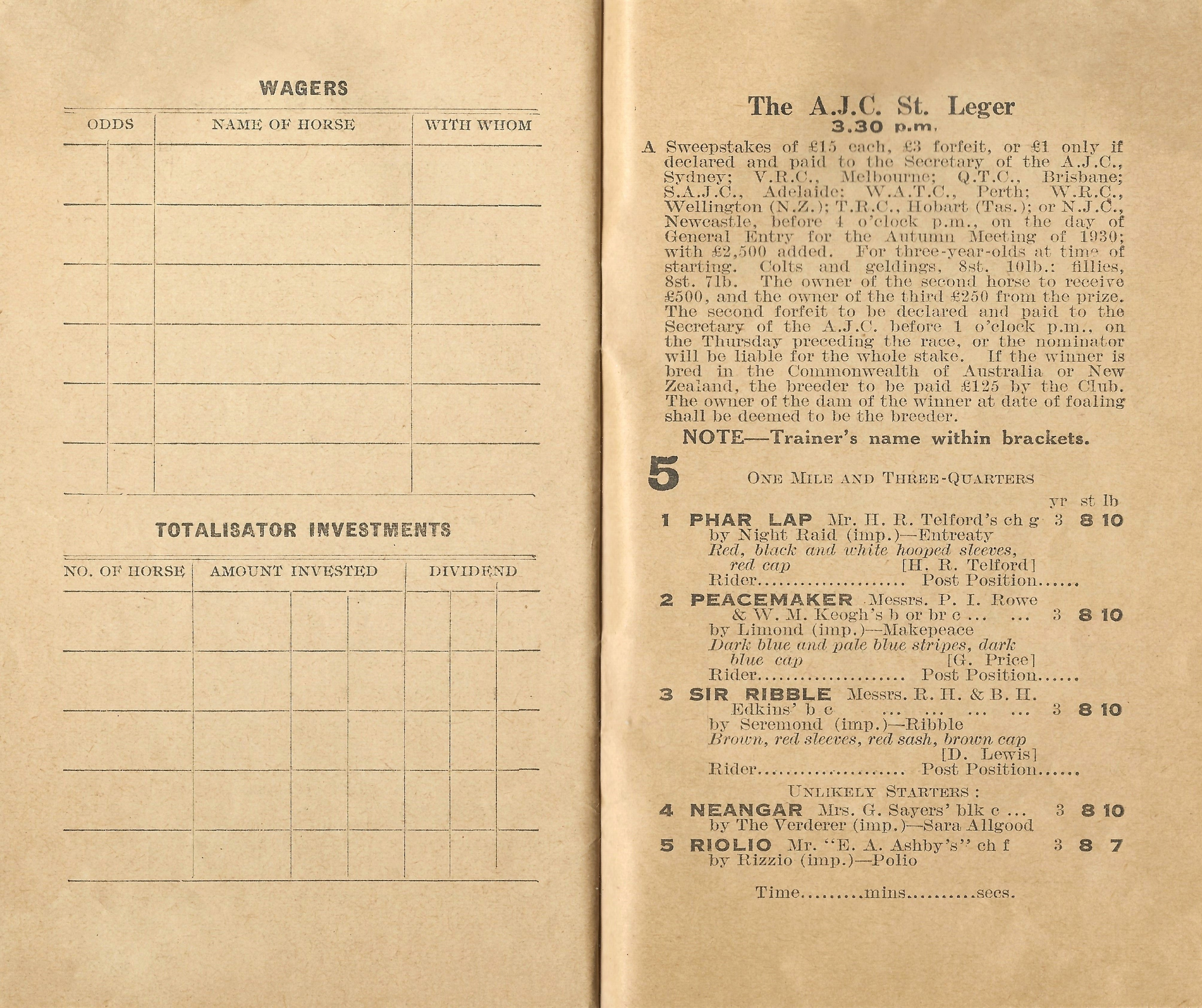
1930 AJC St Leger and the winner, Phar Lap

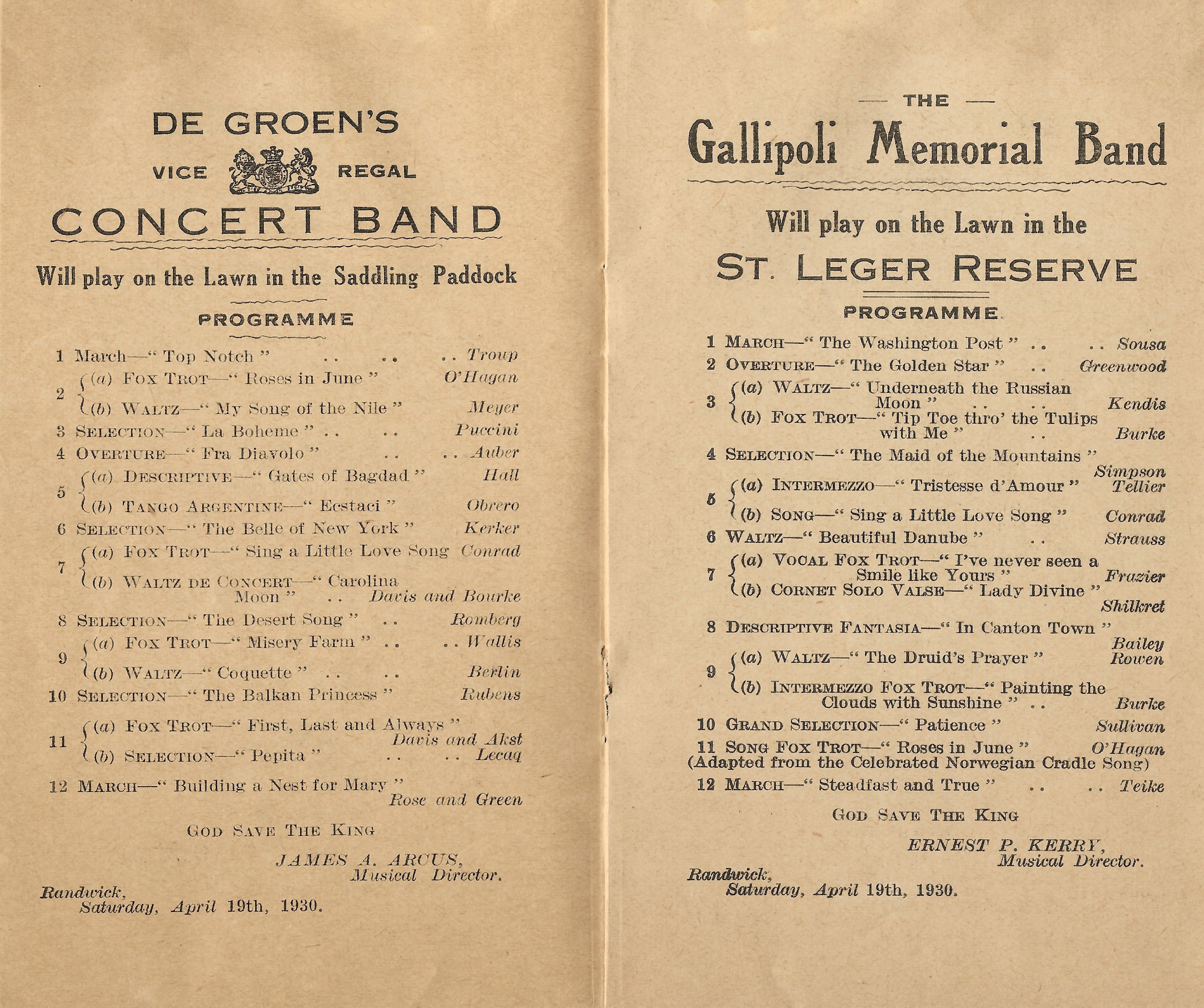
1930 AJC St Leger raceday showing music entertainment for patrons

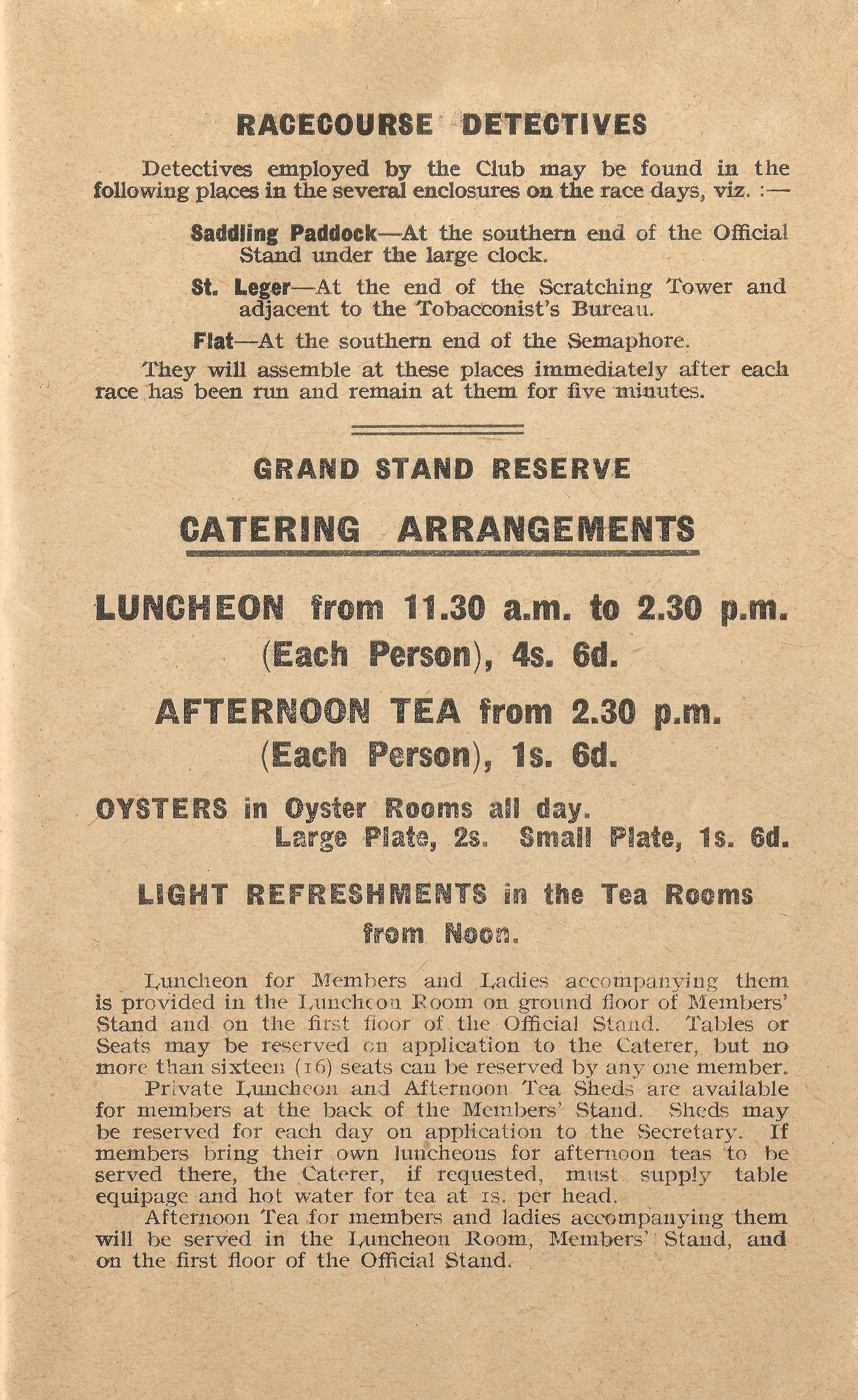
Raceday catering arrangements and racecourse detectives

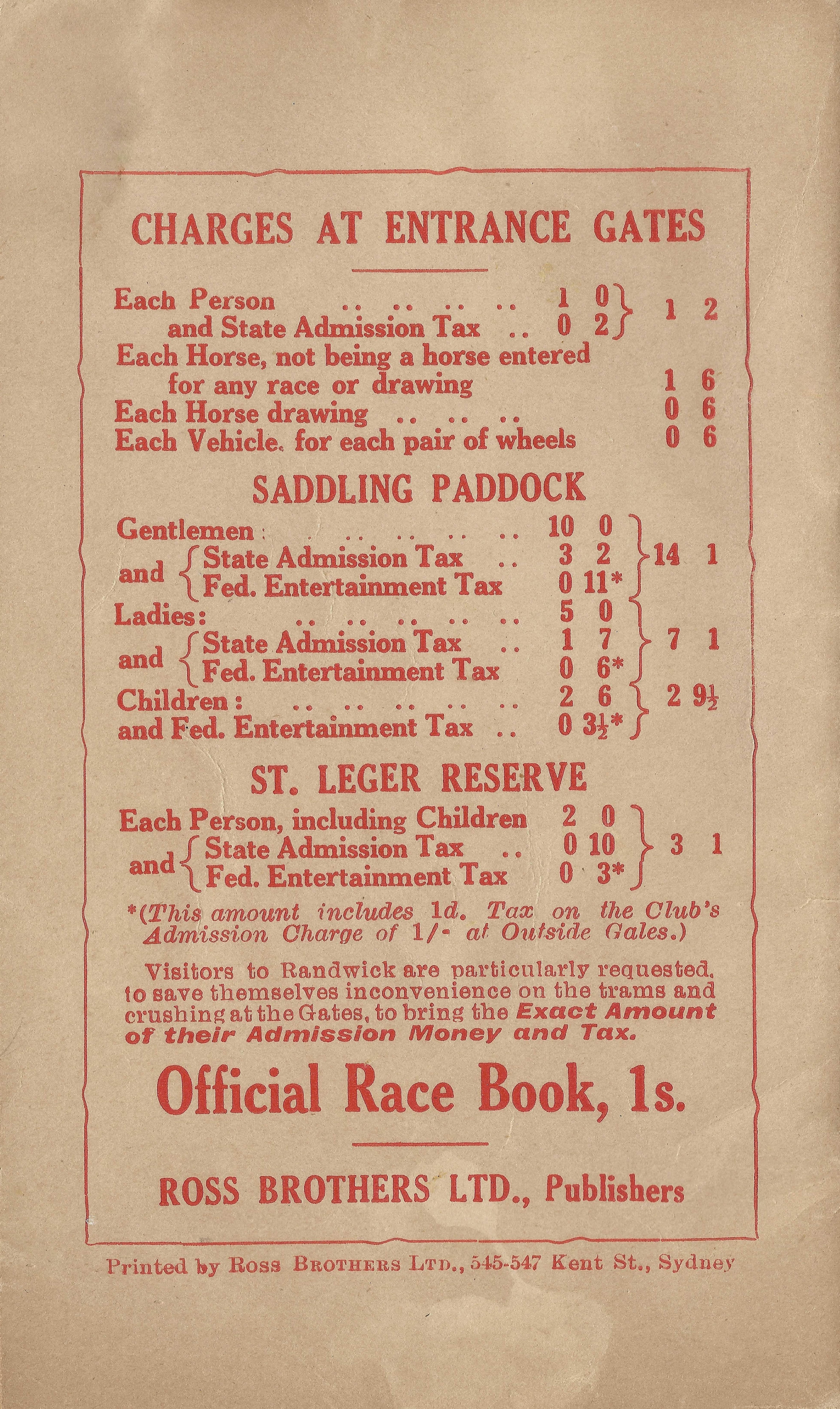
Back cover showing charges at the entrance gates

== Racing statistics ==
| Date | Distance | Race | Class | Course | Weight (stone) | Field | Odds | Result | Time (Note: Official time of winning horse. The time written in grey indicates the winning time that doesn't belong to Phar Lap.) | Winning (Losing) Margin | Jockey | Winner (2nd Place) |
|---|---|---|---|---|---|---|---|---|---|---|---|---|
1928-29 season – Two-year-old season
| 23 Feb 1929 | 5 1/2 furlongs | Nursery Handicap | | Rosehill | 6-11 | 13 | 25/1 | 13th | 1:07.75 | -- | H. C. Martin | Exact |
| 2 Mar 1929 | 5 furlongs | Two Year Old Handicap | | Hawkesbury | 7-3 | 16 | 16/1 | 7th | 1:04.00 | -- | Frank Douglas | Sheila |
| 16 Mar 1929 | 6 furlongs | Nursery Handicap | | Rosehill | 6-7 | 16 | 25/1 | 10th | 1:15.25 | -- | H. C. Martin | My Talisman |
| 1 Apr 1929 | 7 furlongs | Easter Stakes | | Randwick | 7-6 | 11 | 14/1 | 9th | 1:26.50 | -- | Jack Baker | Carradale |
| 27 Apr 1929 | 6 furlongs | Maiden Juvenile Handicap | | Rosehill | 8-0 | 21 | 7/1 | 1st | 1:15.50 | 1/2 length | Jack Baker | (Voleuse) |
1929-30 season – Three-year-old season
| 3 Aug 1929 | 6 furlongs | Denham Court Handicap | | Warwick Farm | 7-2 | 21 | 25/1 | 14th | 1:13.00 | -- | Jimmy Simpson | Killarney |
| 17 Aug 1929 | 7 furlongs | Three Year Old Handicap | | Rosehill | 7-13 | 17 | 8/1 | 4th | 1:27.75 | -- | Jimmy Simpson | Firbolg |
| 17 Aug 1929 | 7 furlongs | Three Year Old Handicap | | Rosehill | 7-13 | 17 | 8/1 | 4th | 1:27.75 | -- | Jimmy Simpson | King Crow |
| 24 Aug 1929 | 7 furlongs | Three and Four Year Old Handicap | | Rosehill | 7-6 | 25 | 16/1 | 16th | 1:27.00 | -- | Jack Brown | Ticino |
| 31 Aug 1929 | 1 mile | Warwick Stakes | WFA | Warwick Farm | 7-6 | 10 | 20/1 | 4th | 1:38.75 | -- | Jack Brown | Limerick |
| 14 Sep 1929 | 1 1/8 miles | Tattersall’s Chelmsford Stakes | WFA | Randwick | 7-6 | 10 | 10/1 | 2nd | 1:52.00 | (1/2 length) | Jack Brown | Mollison |
| 21 Sep 1929 | 1 1/8 miles | Rosehill Guineas | 3YO | Rosehill | 8-5 | 12 | 2/1F | 1st | 1:52.00 | 3 lengths | James L. Munro | (Lorason) |
| 5 Oct 1929 | 1 1/2 miles | AJC Derby | 3YO | Randwick | 8-10 | 11 | 5/4F | 1st | R2:31.25 | 3 1/2 lengths | Jim Pike | (Carradale) |
| 9 Oct 1929 | 1 1/4 miles | Craven Plate | WFA | Randwick | 7-8 | 4 | 5/4F (Note: co-favourite with Mollison.) | 1st | 2:11.25 | 4 lengths | William Duncan | (Mollison) |
| 2 Nov 1929 | 1 1/2 miles | VRC Derby | 3YO | Flemington | 8-10 | 7 | 2/9F | 1st | R2:31.25 | 2 lengths | Jim Pike | (Carradale) |
| 5 Nov 1929 | 2 miles | Melbourne Cup | | Flemington | 7-6 | 14 | EvensF | 3rd | 3:26.50 | (4 lengths) | Robert Lewis | Nightmarch |
| 15 Feb 1930 | 1 1/8 miles | St. George Stakes | WFA | Caulfield | 8-10 | 6 | 7/4 | 3rd | 1:53.75 | (3/4 lengths) | Robert Lewis | Amounis |
| 1 Mar 1930 | 1 3/4 miles | VRC St. Leger | 3YO | Flemington | 8-10 | 5 | 1/2F | 1st | 3:01.25 | 5 lengths | Jim Pike | (Sir Ribble) |
| 6 Mar 1930 | 1 1/2 miles | Governor’s Plate | WFA | Flemington | 7-13 | 4 | 4/9F | 1st | 2:30.25 | 4 lengths | Billy Elliot | (Lineage) |
| 8 Mar 1930 | 2 miles | King’s Plate | WFA | Flemington | 7-11 | 5 | 1/10F | 1st | 3:25.00 | 20 lengths | Billy Elliot | (Second Wind) |
| 12 Apr 1930 | 1 1/4 miles | Chipping Norton Stakes | WFA | Warwick Farm | 8-10 | 5 | 5/4F | 1st | 2:06.00 | 2 1/2 lengths | Jim Pike | (Amounis) |
| 19 Apr 1930 | 1 3/4 miles | AJC St. Leger | 3YO | Randwick | 8-10 | 3 | 1/20F | 1st | 3:07.00 | 3 1/2 lengths | Jim Pike | (Sir Ribble) |
| 23 Apr 1930 | 1 3/4 miles | Cumberland Stakes | WFA | Randwick | 8-1 | 3 | -- | 1st | R2:58.75 | 2 lengths | Billy Elliot | (Donald) |
| 26 Apr 1930 | 2 1/4 miles | AJC Plate | WFA | Randwick | 7-13 | 3 | 2/5F | 1st | R3:49.50 | 10 lengths | Billy Elliot | (Nightmarch) |
| 10 May 1930 | 1 1/8 miles | Elder Stakes | WFA | Morphettville | 8-4 | 2 | -- | 1st | 1:52.00 | 5 lengths | Billy Elliot | (Fruition) |
| 17 May 1930 | 1 1/2 miles | King's Cup | | Morphettville | 9-5 | 6 | -- | 1st | 2:34.00 | 3 1/2 lengths | Jim Pike | (Nadean) |
| 17 May 1930 | 1 1/2 miles | King's Cup | | Morphettville | 9-5 | 6 | -- | 1st | 2:34.00 | 3 1/2 lengths | Jim Pike | (Kirrkie) |
1930-31 season – Four-year-old season
| 30 Aug 1930 | 1 mile | Warwick Stakes | WFA | Warwick Farm | 8-11 | 10 | 10/9F | 2nd | 1:38.00 | (short head) | Jim Pike | Amounis |
| 13 Sep 1930 | 1 1/8 miles | Tattersall’s Chelmsford Stakes | WFA | Randwick | 9-4 (Note: including 7 pounds penalty.) | 7 | 1/5F | 1st | 1:51.50 | 2 1/2 lengths | Jim Pike | (Nightmarch) |
| 20 Sep 1930 | 1 mile | Hill Stakes | WFA | Rosehill | 9-4 | 7 | 2/7F | 1st | 1:40.00 | 1 length | Jim Pike | (Nightmarch) |
| 4 Oct 1930 | 1 1/2 miles | Spring Stakes | WFA | Randwick | 8-11 | 5 | 1/10F | 1st | 2:33.25 | 1/2 length | Jim Pike | (Nightmarch) |
| 8 Oct 1930 | 1 1/4 miles | Craven Plate | WFA | Randwick | 8-11 | 4 | 1/6F | 1st | R2:03.00 | 6 lengths | Jim Pike | (Nightmarch) |
| 11 Oct 1930 | 2 miles | Randwick Plate | WFA | Randwick | 8-11 | 3 | -- | 1st | 3:36.25 | 2 lengths | Jim Pike | (Nightmarch) |
| 25 Oct 1930 | 9 1/2 furlongs | W. S. Cox Plate | WFA | Moonee Valley | 8-11 | 6 | 1/7F | 1st | 1:59.25 | 4 lengths | Jim Pike | (Tregilla) |
| 1 Nov 1930 | 1 1/4 miles | Melbourne Stakes | WFA | Flemington | 8-11 | 5 | 1/5F | 1st | 2:04.50 | 3 lengths | Jim Pike | (Tregilla) |
| 4 Nov 1930 | 2 miles | Melbourne Cup | | Flemington | 9-12 | 15 | 8/11F | 1st | 3:27.75 | 3 lengths | Jim Pike | (Second Wind) |
| 6 Nov 1930 | 1 mile | Linlithgow Stakes | WFA | Flemington | 8-12 | 5 | 1/7F | 1st | 1:37.00 | 4 lengths | Jim Pike | (Mollison) |
| 8 Nov 1930 | 1 1/2 miles | C. B. Fisher Plate | WFA | Flemington | 8-12 | 3 | -- | 1st | 2:48.25 | 3 1/2 lengths | Jim Pike | (Second Wind) |
| 14 Feb 1931 | 1 1/8 miles | St. George Stakes | WFA | Caulfield | 9-7 (Note: including 10 pounds penalty.) | 4 | 1/14F | 1st | 1:54.75 | 2 1/2 lengths | Jim Pike | (Induna) |
| 21 Feb 1931 | 7 furlongs | Futurity Stakes | WFA | Caulfield | 10-3 (Note: including 20 pounds penalty.) | 10 | 1/2F | 1st | 1:27.25 | neck | Jim Pike | (Mystic Peak) |
| 28 Feb 1931 | 1 1/4 miles | Essendon Stakes | WFA | Flemington | 9-7 | 4 | 1/25F | 1st | 2:05.50 | 3 lengths | Jim Pike | (Lampra) |
| 4 Mar 1931 | 1 1/2 miles | King’s Plate | WFA | Flemington | 9-7 | 5 | -- | 1st | 2:37.25 | 1 1/4 lengths | Jim Pike | (Glare) |
| 7 Mar 1931 | 1 mile | C. M. Lloyd Stakes | WFA | Flemington | 9-7 | 4 | 1/4F | 2nd | 1:38.00 | (neck) | Jim Pike | Waterline |
1931-32 season – Five-year-old season
| 25 Aug 1931 | 1 mile | Underwood Stakes | WFA | Williamstown | 9-0 | 6 | 2/1F | 1st | 1:42.50 | 1 3/4 lengths | Billy Elliot | (Rondalina) |
| 5 Sep 1931 | 1 1/8 miles | Memsie Stakes | WFA | Caulfield | 9-8 | 6 | 1/6F | 1st | 1:52.75 | 3 1/2 lengths | Jim Pike | (Rondalina) |
| 19 Sep 1931 | 1 mile | Hill Stakes | WFA | Rosehill | 9-0 | 4 | -- | 1st | 1:39.50 | 1 1/2 lengths | Jim Pike | (Chide) |
| 3 Oct 1931 | 1 1/2 miles | Spring Stakes | WFA | Randwick | 9-2 | 7 | -- | 1st | 2:33.75 | 1 1/4 lengths | Jim Pike | (Chide) |
| 7 Oct 1931 | 1 1/4 miles | Craven Plate | WFA | Randwick | 9-1 | 4 | -- | 1st | R2:02.50 | 4 lengths | Jim Pike | (Pentheus) |
| 10 Oct 1931 | 2 miles | Randwick Plate | WFA | Randwick | 9-3 | 2 | -- | 1st | 3:31.00 | 4 lengths | Jim Pike | (Chide) |
| 24 Oct 1931 | 9 1/2 furlongs | W. S. Cox Plate | WFA | Moonee Valley | 9-4 | 7 | 1/14F | 1st | 2:01.50 | 2 1/2 lengths | Jim Pike | (Chatham) |
| 31 Oct 1931 | 1 1/4 miles | Melbourne Stakes | WFA | Flemington | 9-1 | 4 | -- | 1st | 2:06.50 | 1/2 length | Jim Pike | (Concentrate) |
| 3 Nov 1931 | 2 miles | Melbourne Cup | | Flemington | 10-10 | 14 | 3/1F | 8th | 3:26.00 | -- | Jim Pike | White Nose |
| 20 Mar 1932 | 1 1/4 miles | Agua Caliente Handicap | | Agua Caliente | 9-3 | 11 | 6/5F | 1st | R2:02.80 | 2 lengths | Billy Elliot | (Reveille Boy) |

Legend:
Turf Dirt

- R in the chart and the time written in red indicates the horse finished in record time.

Total: 51 starts – 37 wins, 3 seconds, 2 thirds, 2 fourths, 7 unplaced

== Pedigree ==
Pedigree of Phar Lap (NZ) (2-r), chestnut gelding, 1926
| Sire Night Raid (GB) B. 1918 | Radium (GB); B. 1903 | Bend Or | Doncaster |
| Sire Night Raid (GB) B. 1918 | Radium (GB); B. 1903 | Bend Or | Rouge Rose |
| Sire Night Raid (GB) B. 1918 | Radium (GB); B. 1903 | Taia | Donovan |
| Sire Night Raid (GB) B. 1918 | Radium (GB); B. 1903 | Taia | Eira |
| Sire Night Raid (GB) B. 1918 | Sentiment (GB); B. 1912 | Spearmint | Carbine (NZ) |
| Sire Night Raid (GB) B. 1918 | Sentiment (GB); B. 1912 | Spearmint | Maid of the Mint |
| Sire Night Raid (GB) B. 1918 | Sentiment (GB); B. 1912 | Flair | St. Frusquin |
| Sire Night Raid (GB) B. 1918 | Sentiment (GB); B. 1912 | Flair | Glare |
| Dam Entreaty (NZ) Blk. 1920 | Winkie (GB); Ch. 1912 | William the Third | St.Simon |
| Dam Entreaty (NZ) Blk. 1920 | Winkie (GB); Ch. 1912 | William the Third | Gravity |
| Dam Entreaty (NZ) Blk. 1920 | Winkie (GB); Ch. 1912 | Conjure | Juggler |
| Dam Entreaty (NZ) Blk. 1920 | Winkie (GB); Ch. 1912 | Conjure | Connie |
| Dam Entreaty (NZ) Blk. 1920 | Prayer Wheel (NZ); B. 1905 | Pilgrim's Progress | Isonomy |
| Dam Entreaty (NZ) Blk. 1920 | Prayer Wheel (NZ); B. 1905 | Pilgrim's Progress | Pilgrimage |
| Dam Entreaty (NZ) Blk. 1920 | Prayer Wheel (NZ); B. 1905 | Catherine Wheel | Maxim |
| Dam Entreaty (NZ) Blk. 1920 | Prayer Wheel (NZ); B. 1905 | Catherine Wheel | Miss Kate (F-No.2-r) |

== See also ==
- Thoroughbred racing in Australia
- Thoroughbred racing in New Zealand
- List of Melbourne Cup winners
- List of notable Thoroughbred racehorses
- List of racehorses
- New Zealand Racing Hall of Fame
- Repeat winners of horse races
