= Entreaty =

New Zealand-bred Thoroughbred racehorse

Entreaty was a black New Zealand-bred Thoroughbred mare, who was unplaced in her only race start. She produced twelve horses, one of which was the champion Phar Lap. She was foaled in 1920 out of Prayer Wheel (NZ) by Winkie (GB).

Entreaty's first foal, Fortune's Wheel, a filly by Night Raid, showed no potential as a racehorse. After Phar Lap's success Fortune's Wheel was put back to work again but was unplaced in three race starts. Entreaty had ten more foals after Phar Lap but none possessed anything like Phar Lap's extraordinary ability. Entreaty produced seven full siblings to Phar Lap:

- Fortune's Wheel
- Nea Lap (won 5 races)
- Nightguard (won 9 minor races)
- All Clear
- Friday Night
- Te Uira
- Raphis.

None of her other progeny won a principal (stakes) race.

Phar Lap was a half-brother to another four horses, only two of which were able win any races at all.

Entreaty's daughter Raphis was a good broodmare who produced the following horses:

- Count Cyrano (AJC Metropolitan Handicap)
- Bobalong, dam of Monte Carlo (Australian Derby, AJC Metropolitan Handicap, LKS Mackinnon Stakes, Victoria Derby, AJC St Leger etc.)
- John O'London (CJC Champagne Stakes)
- Swingalong (ARC Great Northern Oaks)

Entreaty died in 1943.

== See also ==
Thoroughbred racing in New Zealand
