= Radium (British horse) =

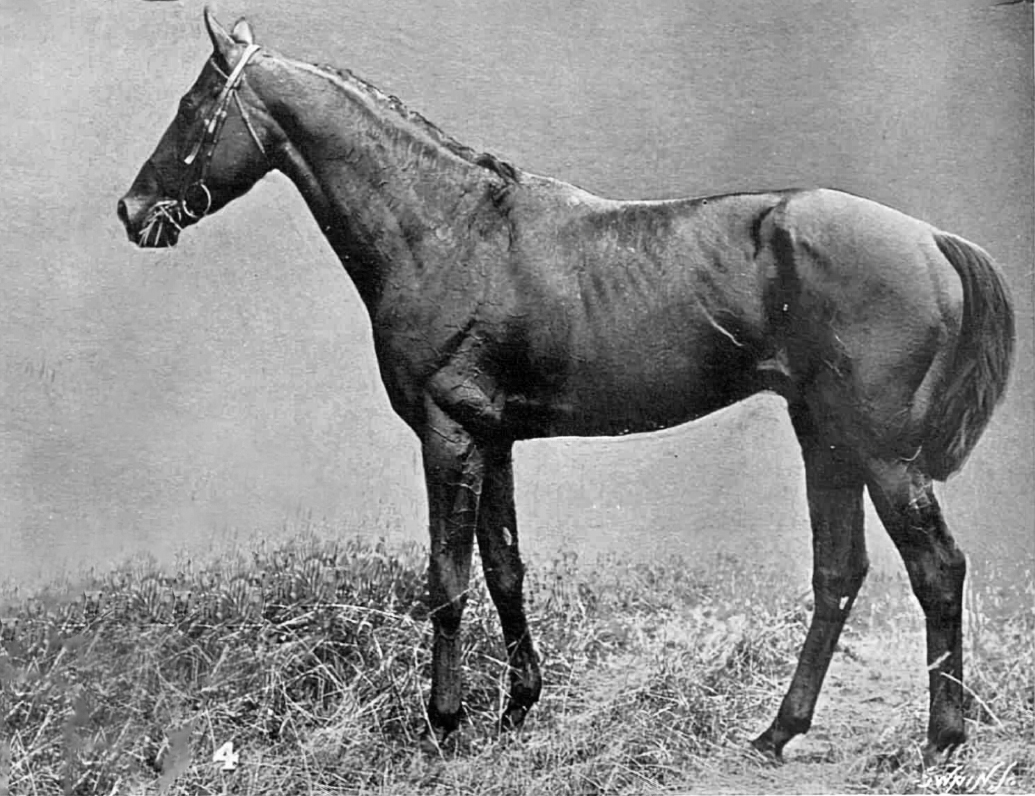
- Radium in 1908.
- Sire: Bend Or
- Grandsire: Doncaster
- Dam: Taia
- Damsire: Donovan
- Sex: Stallion
- Foaled: 1903
- Country: United Kingdom
- Colour: Bay
- Breeder: Leopold de Rothschild
- Owner: Leopold de Rothschild
- Trainer: John Watson
- Record: 24: 10-3-4
- Earnings: £6,730

Major wins
- Jockey Club Cup (1907, 1908); Doncaster Cup (1908); Goodwood Cup (1908)

Radium (1903 – 4 August 1922) was a British Thoroughbred racehorse. A slow maturing racehorse, his most significant wins did not occur until his four and five-year-old seasons. After retiring from racing Radium became a successful stallion, siring 2000 Guineas winner Clarissimus and the sire of Phar Lap.

== Background ==
Radium was foaled in 1903 at Southcourt in Leighton Buzzard, the stud of his breeder and owner Leopold de Rothschild. He was sired by Derby and Champion Stakes winner Bend Or. After retiring from racing Bend Or became a successful stallion. His most successful son was the unbeaten Triple Crown winner, Ormonde. He also sired the champion sire Kendal and Eclipse Stakes winner Orbit. Bend Or was also the leading broodmare sire in Great Britain and Ireland for two years. Radium was foaled in the last crop of Bend Or, the aged stallion dying in January 1903 before Radium's birth.

His dam, Taia, was also bred by Rothschild and was a half-sister to the horse Eros (winner of Althorp Stakes). Raced for two seasons and winless in 10 starts, she had a difficult personality that prevented her from being a successful racehorse. Radium was Taia's fourth and last foal before her death in 1905.

== Racing career ==
=== Early racing career ===
Radium began his training as a two-year-old under John Watson in February 1905, with initial training runs being impressive. He started in the Khedive Plate at the Newmarket July meeting and was thoroughly beaten with his run later being described as "indifferent." After a place in a race at the Goodwood meeting, Radium won the Prince of Wales's Nursery Stakes at Doncaster. Returning as a three-year-old, he was third to Beppo and Bridge of Canny in the Union Jack Stakes in Liverpool and was unplaced for the Newmarket Biennial. He was second to Sarcelle for the Chippenham Plate at the second spring meeting at Newmarket. Radium's only Classic race start was in the 1906 Derby, which was won by Spearmint, where he battled with Troutbeck for a fourth-place finish.

=== 1907: four-year-old-season ===
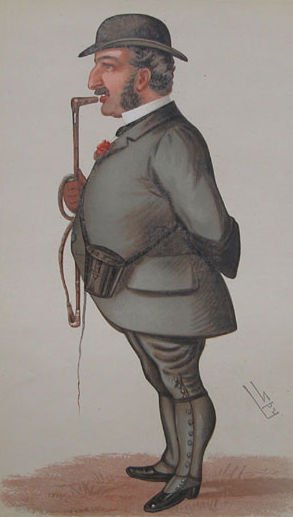
Leopold de Rothschild, by Leslie Ward, 1884.

Radium's form remarkably improved as a four-year-old with the press noting that he seemed to "show what was in him." He won the Biennial Stakes, was second for the Great Yorkshire Handicap, and was unplaced in the Doncaster Cup. Following uncontested wins in the Rous Stakes and Rutland Handicap, Radium defeated the 11-4 favorite The White Knight in the Ascot Gold Cup. The running of the Jockey Club Cup in 1907 was described as, "one of the most farcical races that has ever been run on Newmarket Heath." Radium beat The White Knight at the slow time of 5 minutes and 32 seconds, setting what the crowds remarked was a ridiculously slow pace for the length of the course.

=== 1908: five-year-old season ===
Radium lost the 1908 Ascot Gold Cup and Coronation Cup to The White Knight by a margin of five lengths in a much publicized rematch against the racing rivals. Winning the Dullingham Plate, Radium again raced The White Knight and beat him for the Goodwood Cup. Further wins in the Doncaster Cup, Beaufort Stakes, and a second victory in the Jockey Club Cup cemented Radium as one of the best older horses of the season.

== Stud career ==
Rothschild retained Radium as a breeding stallion at Southcourt Stud for the remainder of the stallion's life. By 1920, Radium's fee had been reduced to £49 due to fertility issues, and he sired no foals after 1920. Radium was euthanised at Southcourt Stud on 4 August 1922 at the age of 19.

=== Notable Progeny ===
c = colt, f = filly

Foaled	Name	Sex	Major Wins or Progeny
1911	Fairy Ray	f	Dam of Marguerite and Cloudland
1912	Apothecary	c	Clearwell Stakes, Newmarket Gold Cup, sire in UK
1913	Clarissimus	c	Clearwell Stakes, 2000 Guineas, Champion Stakes
1914	King Offa	c	Caulfield Cup, October Stakes
1914	Rebus	c	Sydney Cup, Villiers Stakes, Epsom Handicap, The Metropolitan (ATC)
1917	Periosteum	c	Ascot Gold Cup
1918	Night Raid	c	Leading sire in Australia and sire of Phar Lap
1919	Condover	c	Coronation Cup, Prix d'Ispahan, Prix Rond Point

== Pedigree ==
Pedigree of Radium (GB), Bay colt, 1903
Sire Bend Or (GB) Chestnut, 1877	Doncaster; 1870	Stockwell	The Baron
Sire Bend Or (GB) Chestnut, 1877	Doncaster; 1870	Stockwell	Pocahontas
Sire Bend Or (GB) Chestnut, 1877	Doncaster; 1870	Marigold	Teddington
Sire Bend Or (GB) Chestnut, 1877	Doncaster; 1870	Marigold	Sister to Singapore
Sire Bend Or (GB) Chestnut, 1877	Rouge Rose; 1865	Thormanby	Windhound
Sire Bend Or (GB) Chestnut, 1877	Rouge Rose; 1865	Thormanby	Alice Hawthorn
Sire Bend Or (GB) Chestnut, 1877	Rouge Rose; 1865	Ellen Horne	Redshank
Sire Bend Or (GB) Chestnut, 1877	Rouge Rose; 1865	Ellen Horne	Delhi
Dam Taia Bay, 1892	Donovan; 1886	Galopin	Vedette
Dam Taia Bay, 1892	Donovan; 1886	Galopin	Flying Duchess
Dam Taia Bay, 1892	Donovan; 1886	Mowerina	Scottish Chief
Dam Taia Bay, 1892	Donovan; 1886	Mowerina	Stockings
Dam Taia Bay, 1892	Eira; 1881	Kisber	Buccaneer
Dam Taia Bay, 1892	Eira; 1881	Kisber	Mineral
Dam Taia Bay, 1892	Eira; 1881	Aeolia	Parmesan
Dam Taia Bay, 1892	Eira; 1881	Aeolia	Breeze

- Radium is inbred 3x5 to Stockwell.
