= Jim Pike (jockey) =

Australian jockey (1892–1969)

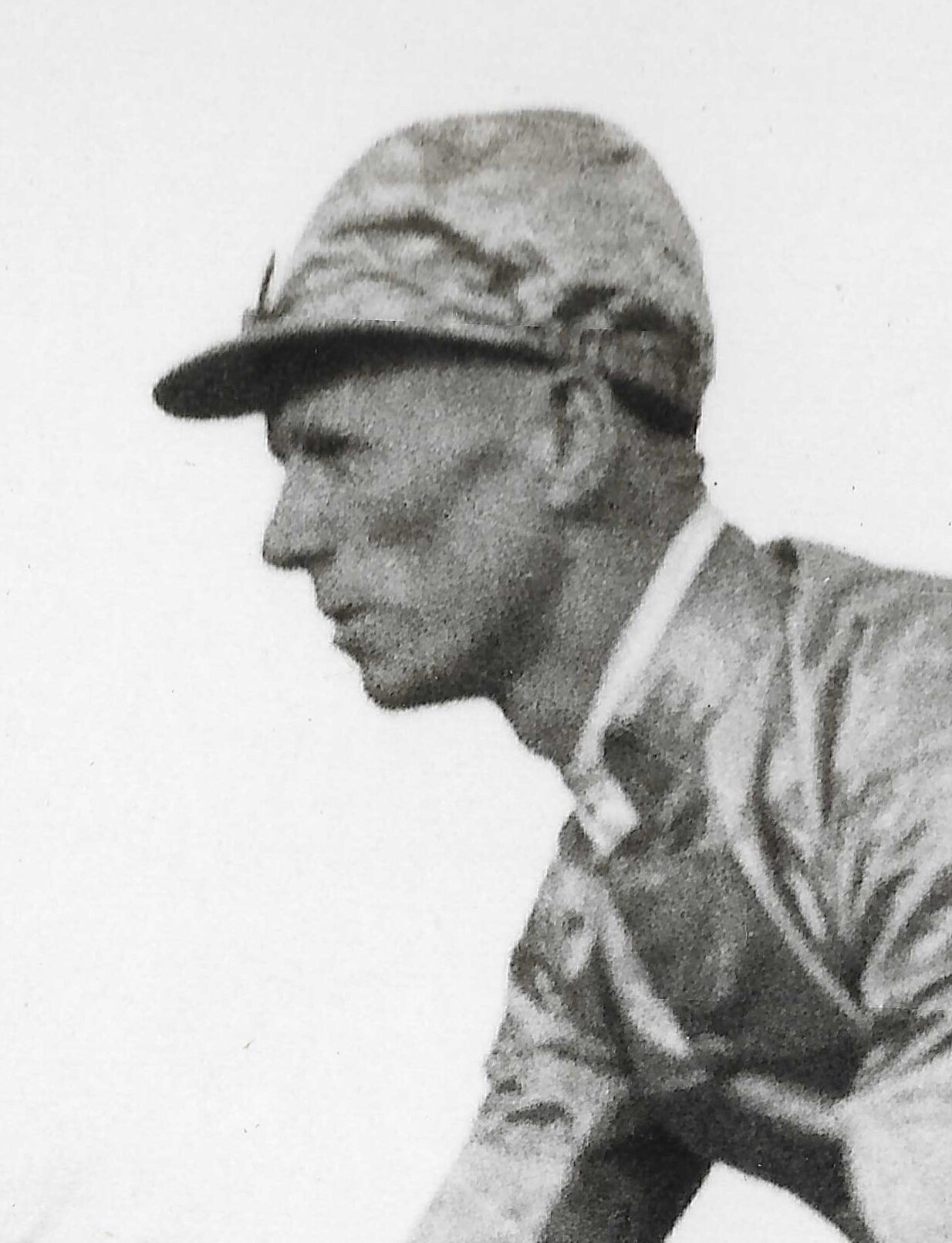
- Pike in 1935

Personal information
- Nickname: The Master
- Nationality: Australian
- Born: James Edward Pike; 4 September 1892 The Junction, New South Wales, Australia
- Died: 7 October 1969 (aged 77) Bondi, New South Wales, Australia
- Occupation: Jockey

James Edward Pike (4 September 1892 − 7 October 1969), also nicknamed "The Master", was an Australian jockey who is best known for riding Phar Lap to victory in the 1930 Melbourne Cup.

Pike was born on 4 September 1892 at Kemp Street, The Junction, New South Wales, a suburb of Newcastle. He was the eldest child of Charles and Jane Isabella Pike (née Liddell). He started his career as a jockey in 1907. He went to England the following year and competed in 17 races, winning 2 and 5 placings. Returning to Australia he won his first major race at 18 in the Victoria Derby in 1910 with Beverage.

Pike's first ride on Phar Lap was in the 1929 Victoria Derby, which they won by two lengths. The pair would combine to win 27 out of 30 races during their partnership, which included two Cox Plates and a Melbourne Cup.

Pike had a wife, as well as a son and a daughter. He died in poverty on 7 October 1969, aged 77, at his home in Bondi and was cremated.

Jim Pike is the great-great-grandfather of Western Australian champion jockey, William Pike.

== Popular culture ==
In the 1983 feature film Phar Lap, Pike was played by Australian actor James Steele.

== Honours ==
In 2002, Pike was inducted into the Australian Racing Hall of Fame.

== Image gallery ==
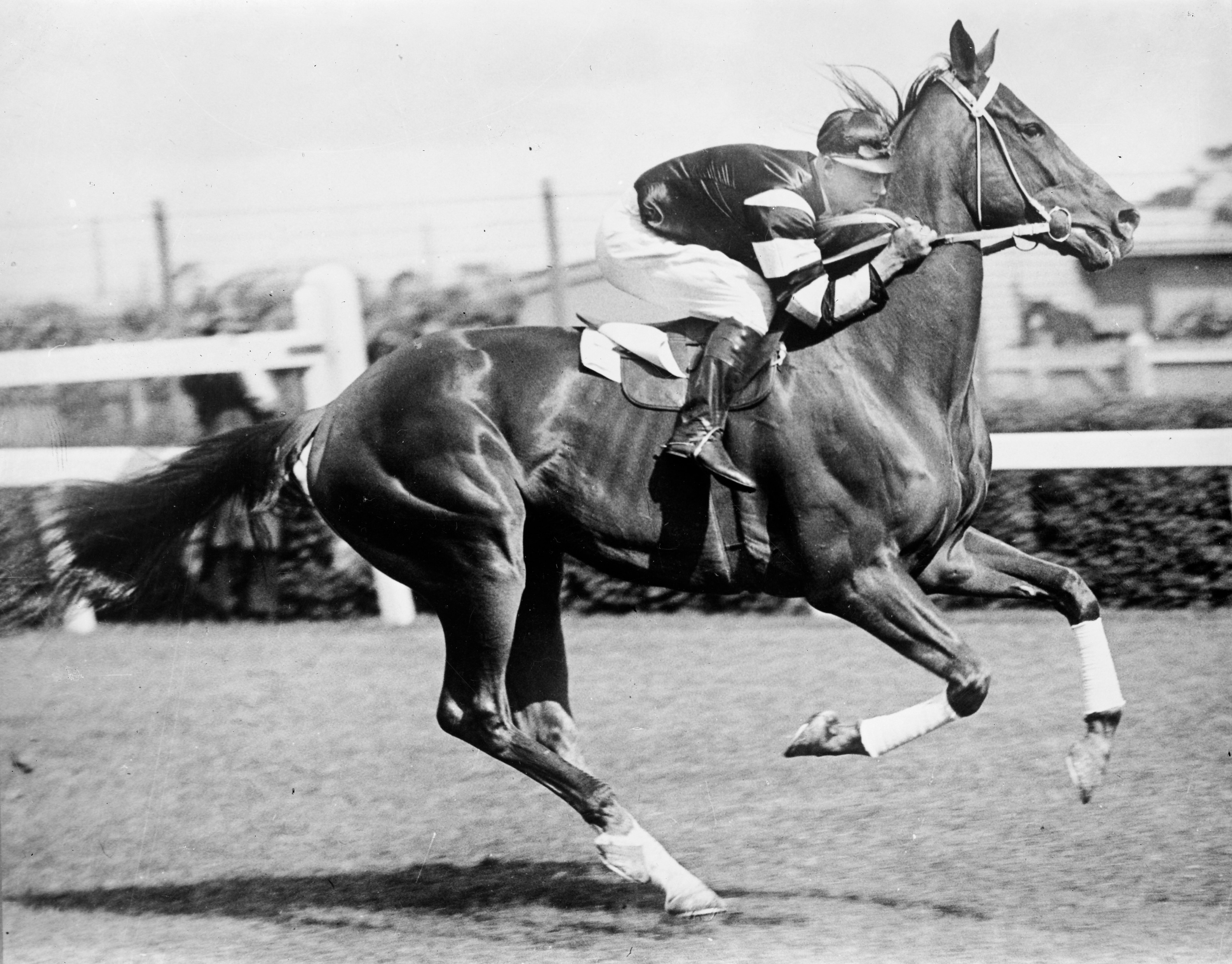
Jim Pike and Phar Lap at Flemington Racecourse, 1930.

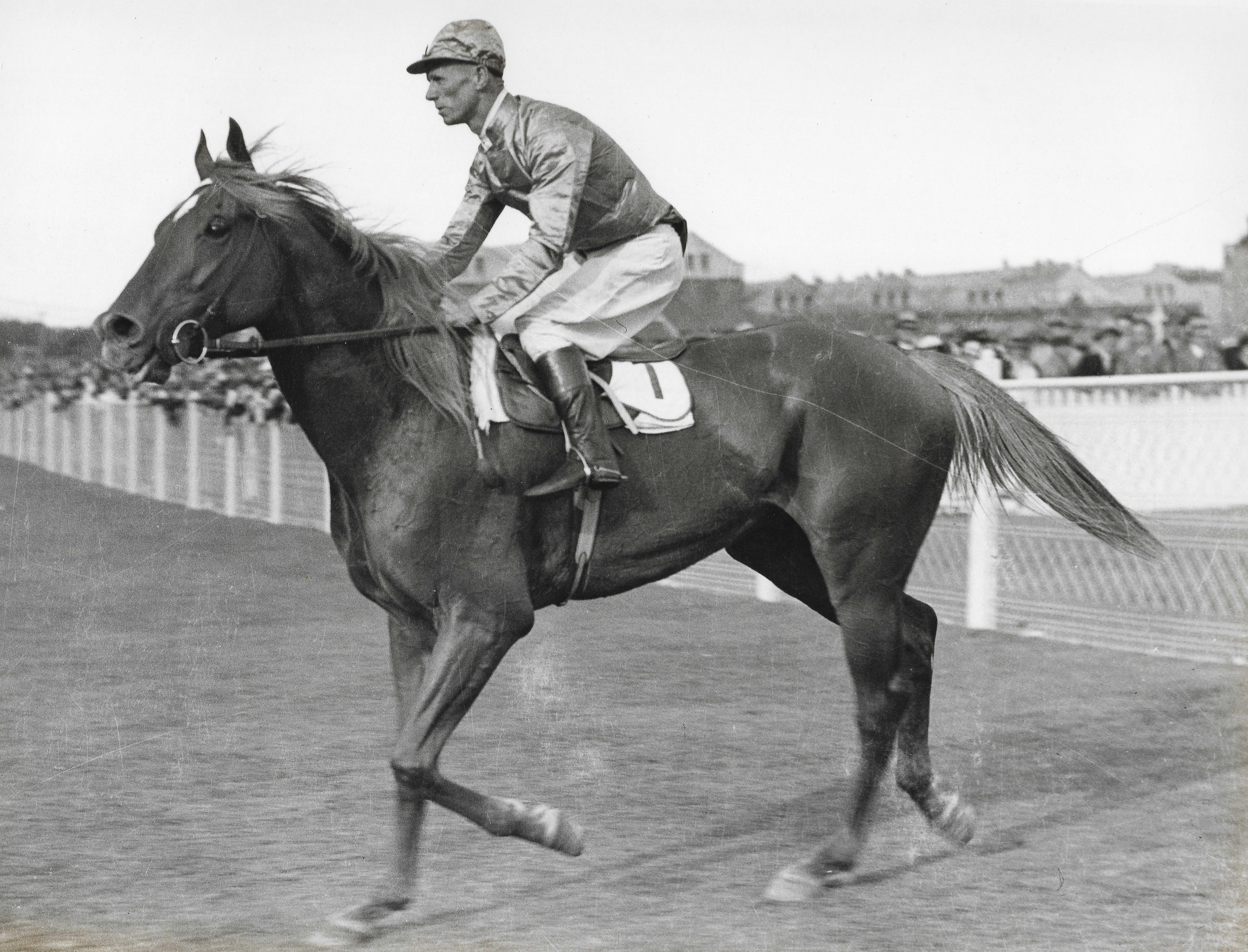
Jim Pike and Peter Pan at Randwick Racecourse, 1935.

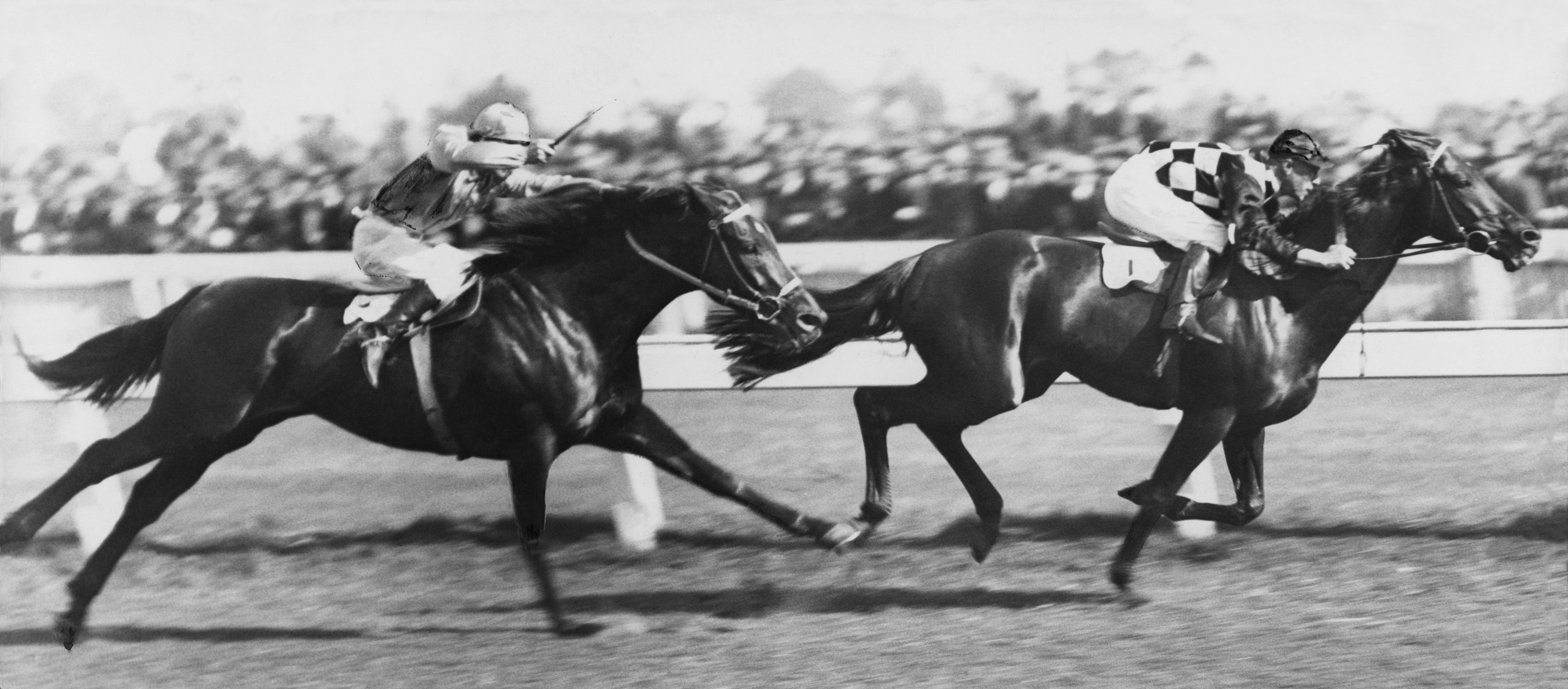
Jim Pike and Gothic at Caulfield Racecourse, 1928.
