= Nursery Stakes =

Type of horse race

The Nursery Stakes, or other designations incorporating the word "Nursery", refers to a Thoroughbred horse race used by racetracks worldwide to identify it as a novice race exclusively for two-year-olds, the age a horse is first legally allowed to compete.

In use since the 18th century, it is today still used but is a somewhat dated term. In recent decades the Nursery designation in a race title has often been supplanted by the term "Juvenile". Current or defunct "Nursery" races include:

Australia:

- VATC Gwyn Nursery at Caulfield Racecourse
- RRC Nursery Handicap.

United States:

- Nursery Stakes at Belmont Park
- Pimlico Nursery Stakes at Pimlico Race Course
- Pennsylvania Nursery Stakes at Philadelphia Park Racetrack
- Santa Catalina Nursery Stakes at Santa Anita Park.

Great Britain:

- Nursery Stakes at Newmarket Racecourse
- Princes of Wales's Nursery Plate at Doncaster Racecourse.

South Africa:

- Nursery Stakes at Turffontein Racecourse.
