= Strapper =

Person holding a position looking after racehorses

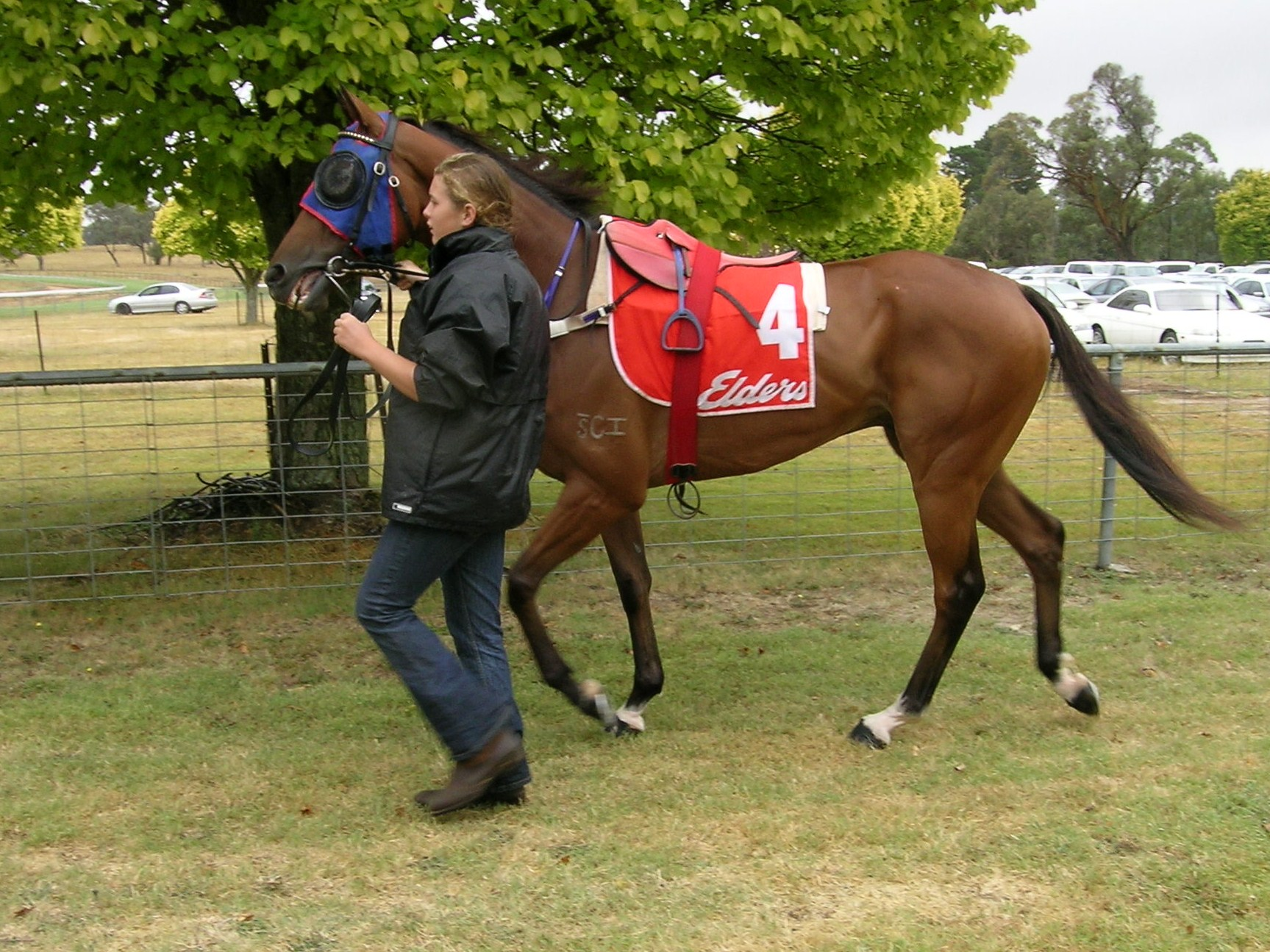
A strapper leading a racehorse.

A strapper is a British English term, mostly used in Australia, for a person holding a position looking after racehorses. The duties range from cleaning out the stables and yards, feeding, grooming and rugging horses, plus saddling horses for track-work and races, hence the name. Relevant vocational qualifications include Horse Care and Saddlery.

In North America, these tasks are lumped into the general job category of "groom," though saddling may be a task assigned to more experienced grooms while stall cleaning and walking hot horses are tasks assigned to the less-experienced stablehand.

== See also ==
- Farrier
- Glossary of Australian and New Zealand punting
- Hostler
