= Night Raid =

British Thoroughbred stallion

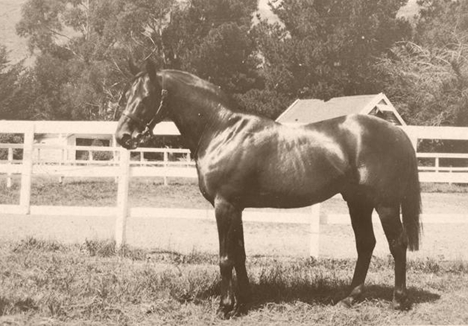
- Night Raid in 1932.
- Sire: Radium
- Grandsire: Bend Or
- Dam: Sentiment
- Damsire: Spearmint
- Sex: Stallion
- Foaled: 1918
- Country: Great Britain
- Colour: Bay
- Breeder: Major F.C. Stern
- Owner: (1) Archie Douglas-Pennant (2) J. McGuigan (3) Peter Keith (4) A.P. Wade (5) A.F. Roberts (at stud)
- Trainer: (1) Captain Tom Hogg (2) J. McGuigan (3) Peter Keith (4) George Jones for A.P. Wade
- Record: 25: 2-0-1

Awards
- 1929-1931 Leading sire in Australia
- Last updated on 18 November 2010

Night Raid (foaled 1918 in England) was a Leading sire in Australia of Thoroughbred racehorses. He sired two leading racehorses, Phar Lap and Nightmarch.

== Background ==
He was sired by the Doncaster Cup and Goodwood Cup winner, Radium and his dam Sentiment was by The Derby winner and good sire, Spearmint. Radium was the sire of several stakes winners including Clarissimus, who won 2,000 Guineas Stakes. Sentiment's only stakes winner was Night Raid. He was line-bred to Galopin in the 4th and 5th generation (4m x 5f).

== Racing career ==
Although well bred, Night Raid was only moderately successful on the racecourse, not winning any of his six starts in England, but he did finish third in a Nursery Selling Plate. In Australia he had twenty-nine starts for one win and a dead heat.

== Stud record ==
Night Raid served one season at stud in Australia during 1923 and then resumed racing. He was retired to stud in New Zealand in 1924. His legacy as a sire is outstanding. Night Raid sired two great racehorses, namely Phar Lap and Nightmarch, victors in the successive Group One, Melbourne Cup in 1929 and 1930.

In all Night Raid sired 13 stakeswinners that had 75 stakeswins, including:

- Blixten (won RRC Rosehill Guineas etc.)
- Nightbeam (won The Metropolitan (ATC) etc.)
- Nightly (winner of seven Principal Races in Australia and New Zealand including CJC New Zealand Derby, MVRC Moonee Valley Cup, CJC Canterbury Cup)
- Nightmarch (RRC Rawson Stakes, New Zealand Cup, Melbourne Cup, WS Cox Plate, New Zealand Derby and AJC Epsom Handicap
- Phar Lap (Australian Derby, VRC Melbourne Cup, Victoria Derby, WS Cox Plate [twice] and 1932 Agua Caliente Handicap,

plus Aesulus, Lady Graceful, Pillow Fight, Peter Jackson and The Cardinal all of which were successful racehorses in their own right.

== See also ==
- List of racehorses
- Thoroughbred racing in New Zealand
- Thoroughbred racing in Australia
