= Nightmarch =

New Zealand-bred Thoroughbred racehorse

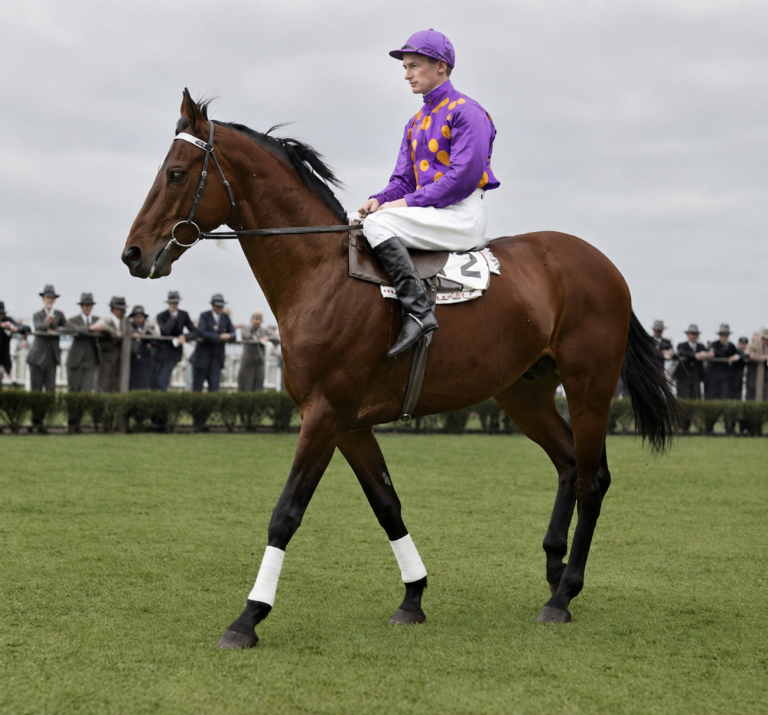
- Nightmarch and Roy Reed
- Sire: Night Raid (GB)
- Grandsire: Radium
- Dam: Marsa
- Damsire: Martian
- Sex: Stallion
- Foaled: 1925
- Died: 1954
- Country: New Zealand
- Colour: Brown
- Breeder: Kain brothers
- Owner: 1. Mr G.A. Kain; 2. Alan Louisson; 3. Eric Connolly (manager)
- Trainer: Jim McAulay
- Record: 69: 23½-18-11
- Earnings: £32,116

Major wins
- New Zealand Derby (1928); New Zealand 2000 Guineas (1928); Epsom Handicap (1929); W S Cox Plate (1929); Melbourne Cup (1929); AJC Randwick Plate (1929); New Zealand Cup (1930); Rawson Stakes (1930); AJC Autumn Stakes (1930, 1932); Awapuni Gold Cup (1931, 1932); AJC Cumberland Stakes (1932)
- Last updated on 18 September 2010

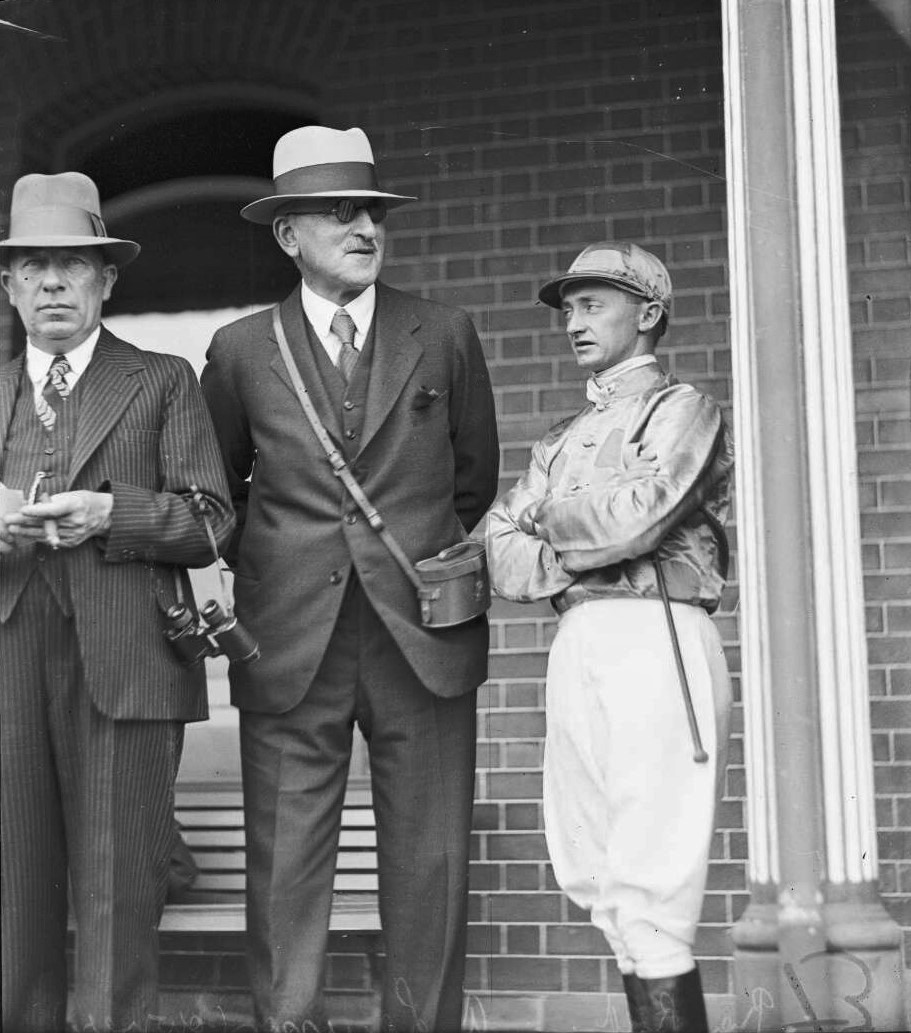
Nightmarch owner Alan Louisson (centre) & jockey Roy Reed

Nightmarch (1925−1954) was an outstanding New Zealand bred Thoroughbred racehorse known as The Kiwi. He won the New Zealand Derby and Dunedin Cup as a three-year-old before going to Australia where he became the first horse to win both the Melbourne Cup and Cox Plate in the same year, as well as other Principal races.

He was by Night Raid, the sire of Phar Lap, out of the good racemare and broodmare, Marsa (1911) by Martian, a mare that traced to Manto. Marsa produced five foals, all of which raced and were winners.

== Racing record ==
As a two-year-old he had eight starts and won two, the Dunedin J.C. Juvenile (by two lengths) and Hopeful Handicaps, having dead heated with Full Feather in the latter race.

Nightmarch was then sold privately to Alan Louisson, and won the Canterbury Linwood Handicap, New Zealand Derby, Marton Cup, Dunedin Cup, and Great Autumn Handicap for him when he was a three-year-old.

In the spring of 1929, Louisson took Nightmarch to Sydney where he was unplaced in his first start at Rosehill, New South Wales. The big betting punter, Eric Connolly offered £10,000 for Nightmarch (which was rejected) after a betting plunge by others, had been made on Nightmarch's Metropolitan Handicap winning chances. Connolly instead became the horse's "campaign manager" and his training was then altered to suit the one mile of the AJC Epsom Handicap instead of the 13 furlongs of the Metropolitan Handicap. A big betting plunge succeeded then when Nightmarch won the Tattersall's Spring Handicap. A Metropolitan Handicap start agreed upon and was won by Loquacious (a sister to Windbag) with Nightmarch, who carried 9 st. 12 lbs. (75.5 kg), a ½ length away in second place. After the race Connolly received numerous threatening phone calls, some indicating possible personal injury.

Nightmarch firmed from 20–1 to 3–1 favourite before he won the AJC Epsom Handicap (carrying 9 stone 4 pounds). Following this he won the Randwick Plate, the W S Cox Plate and the Melbourne Cup (after another huge betting plunge by Connolly, which netted him at least £100,000) with two pounds over weight-for-age from Phar Lap. After that, until the end of his long career, Nightmarch was seldom unplaced. In Dunedin, New Zealand Nightmarch won the James Hazlett Gold Cup and back again in New South Wales won the Rawson Stakes and AJC Autumn Stakes (defeating Amounis). During his four-year-old season he had a total of 16 starts for 8 wins, 3 seconds and 4 thirds.

As a five-year-old he placed third to Amounis and Phar Lap in the Warwick Stakes and was also third in the Canterbury Stakes. In his next four starts he ran second to Phar Lap each time—in the Chelmsford Stakes, Hill Stakes, AJC Spring Stakes, and Craven Plate. Back in New Zealand he won the New Zealand Cup and Canterbury Cup and was second in the GG Stead Memorial Gold Cup before winning the Trentham Gold Cup and Awapuni Cup, and ended his fourth racing season with a second at Canterbury, New Zealand, in the CJC Challenge Stakes, conceding the winner 43 pounds.

At his first start as a six-year-old Nightmarch was second in the James Hazlett Gold Cup. Back in Sydney, Ammon Ra defeated him into second place in both the Rawson Stakes and AJC Chipping Norton Stakes. He won his next two races, the AJC Autumn Stakes and AJC Cumberland Stakes, which he won from Veilmond on each occasion. In the A.J.C. Plate he was unplaced to Veilmond but finished the racing year by again winning the Awapuni Cup.

As a seven-year-old Nightmarch did not win again, although he was second to Peter Pan by half a length in the Rosehill Hill Stakes next spring. His last stake-earning was third place behind Veilmond in the AJC Spring Stakes.

=== Summary ===
Nightmarch was the first horse to win both the Melbourne Cup and Cox Plate in the same year (1929), a feat repeated by Phar Lap the following year (1930), fellow New Zealand racehorse Rising Fast in 1954, Saintly in 1996 and Makybe Diva in 2005. Overall he had 69 starts for 23½ wins (including a dead heat), 18 seconds and 11 thirds for £32,116. At the time the two greats Gloaming and Nightmarch were considered New Zealand's true champions.

=== 1930 and 1932 racebooks ===
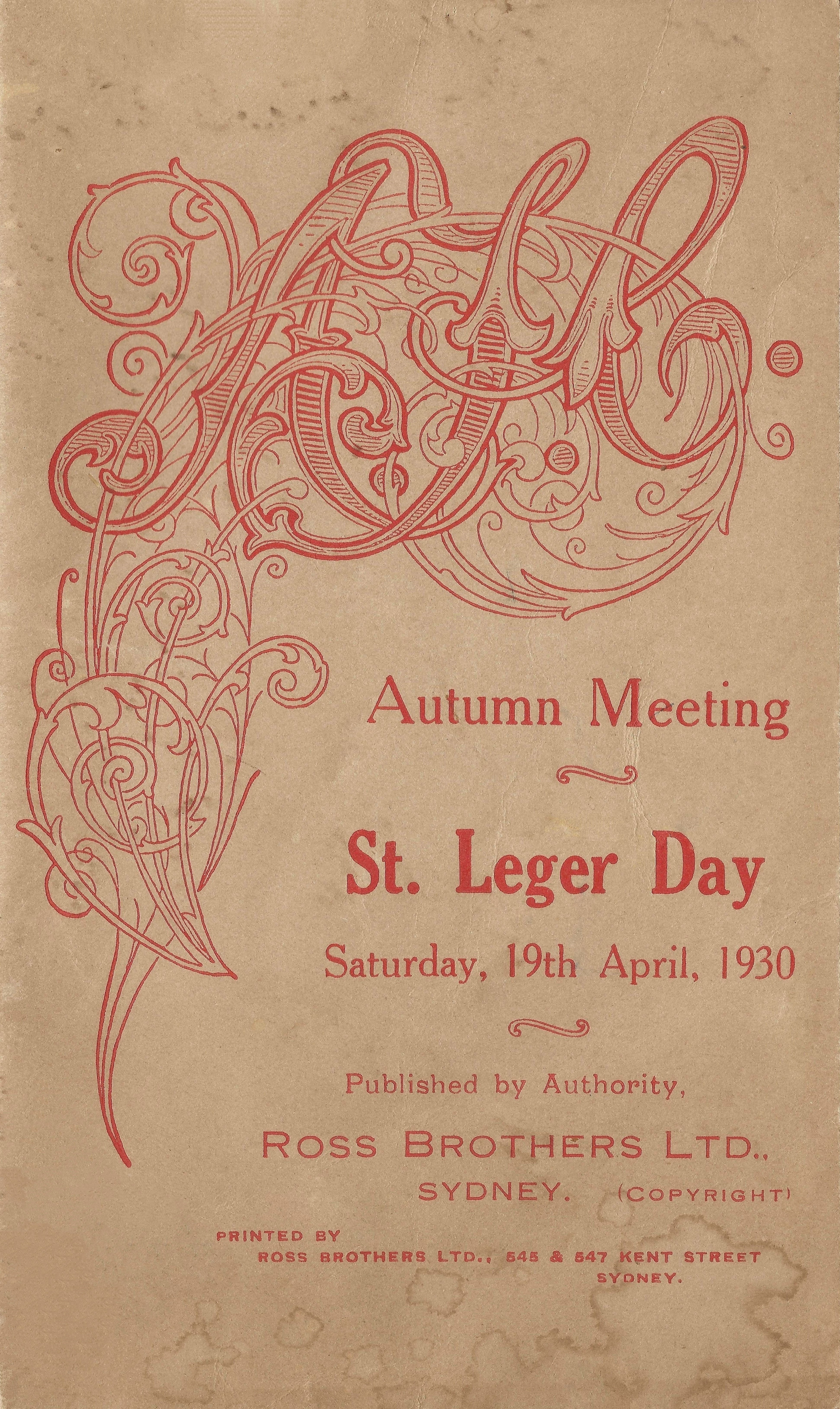
1930 AJC St Leger racebook front cover

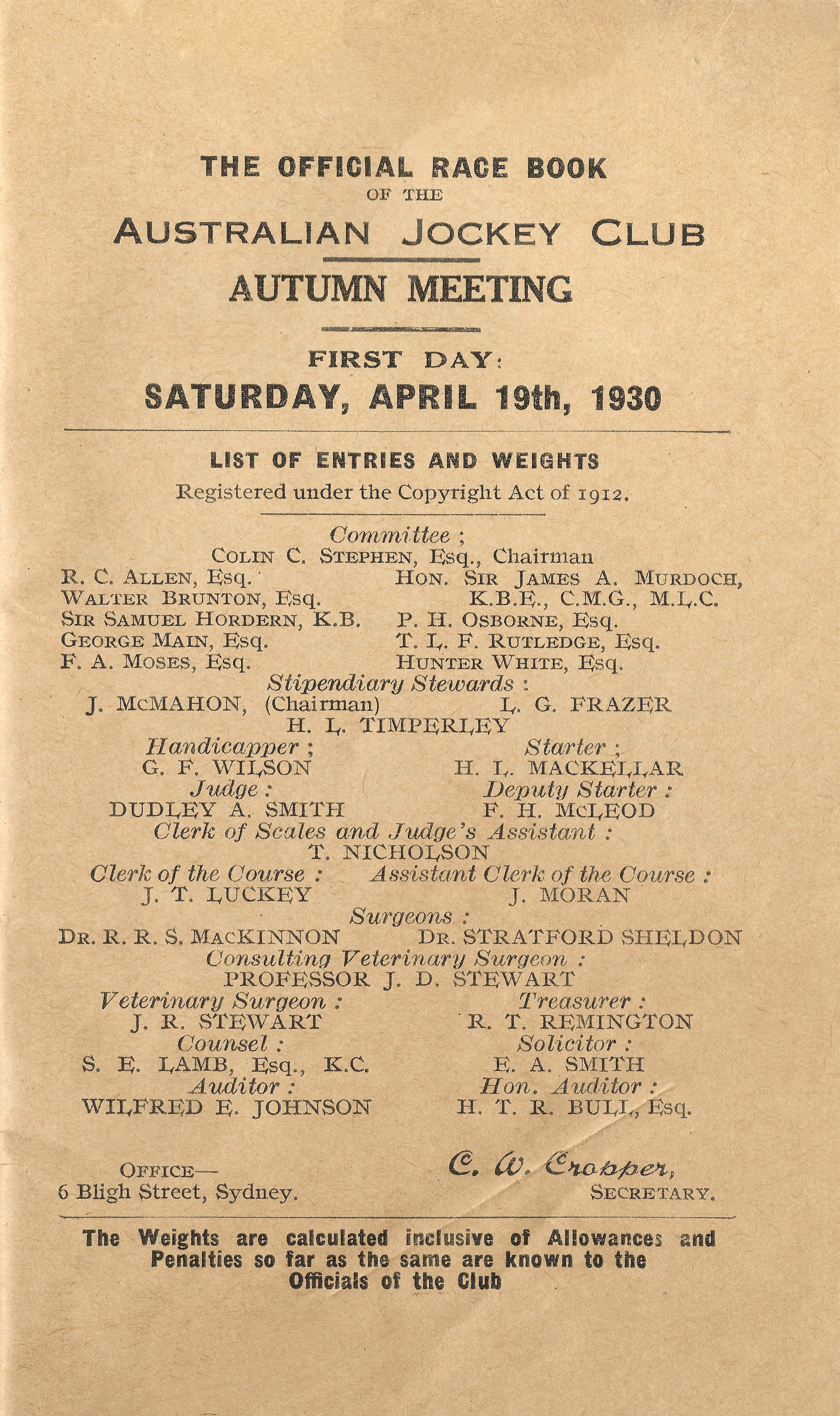
1930 AJC St Leger inside cover showing raceday officials

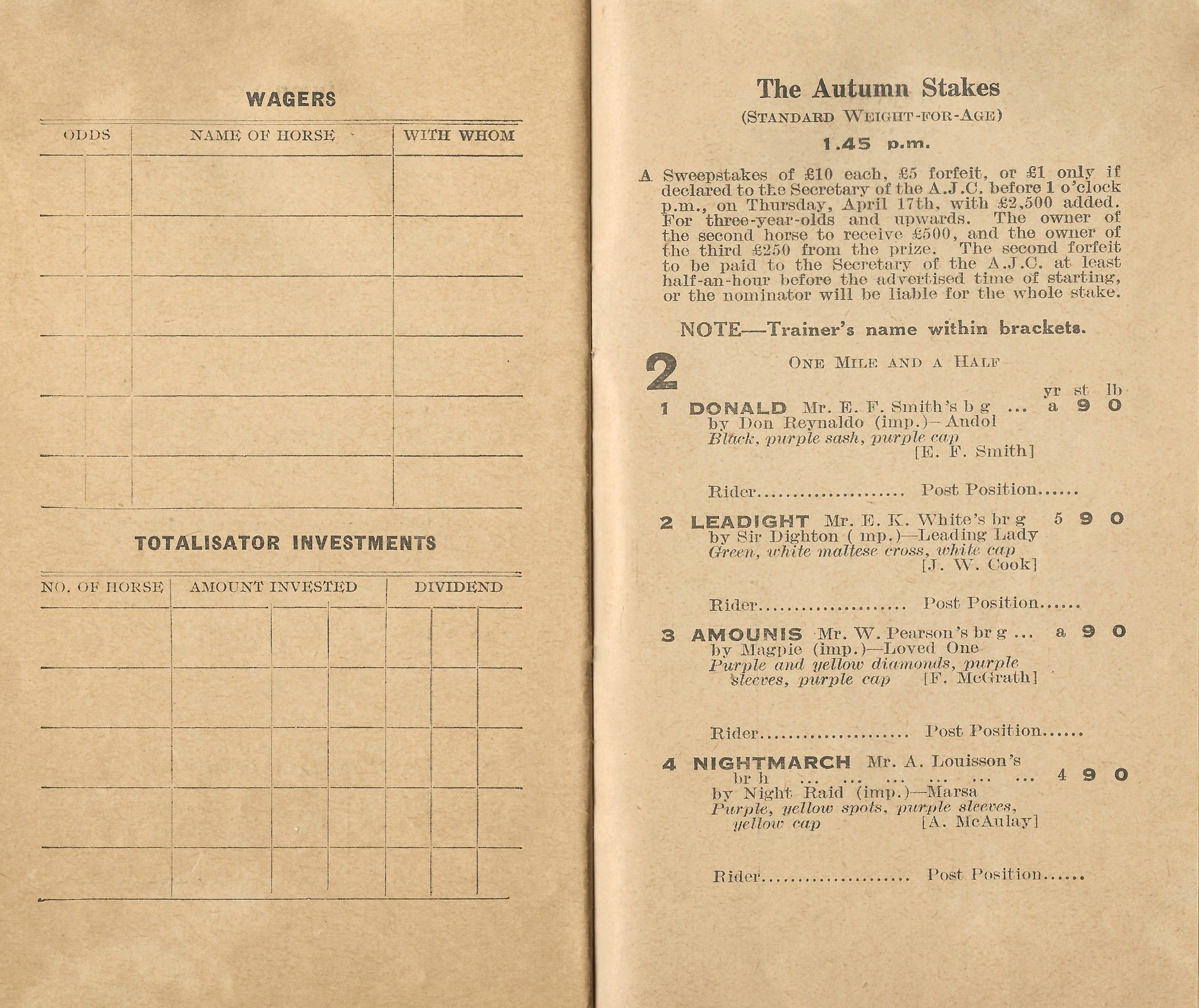
1930 AJC Autumn Stakes page starters and results showing the winner, Nightmarch

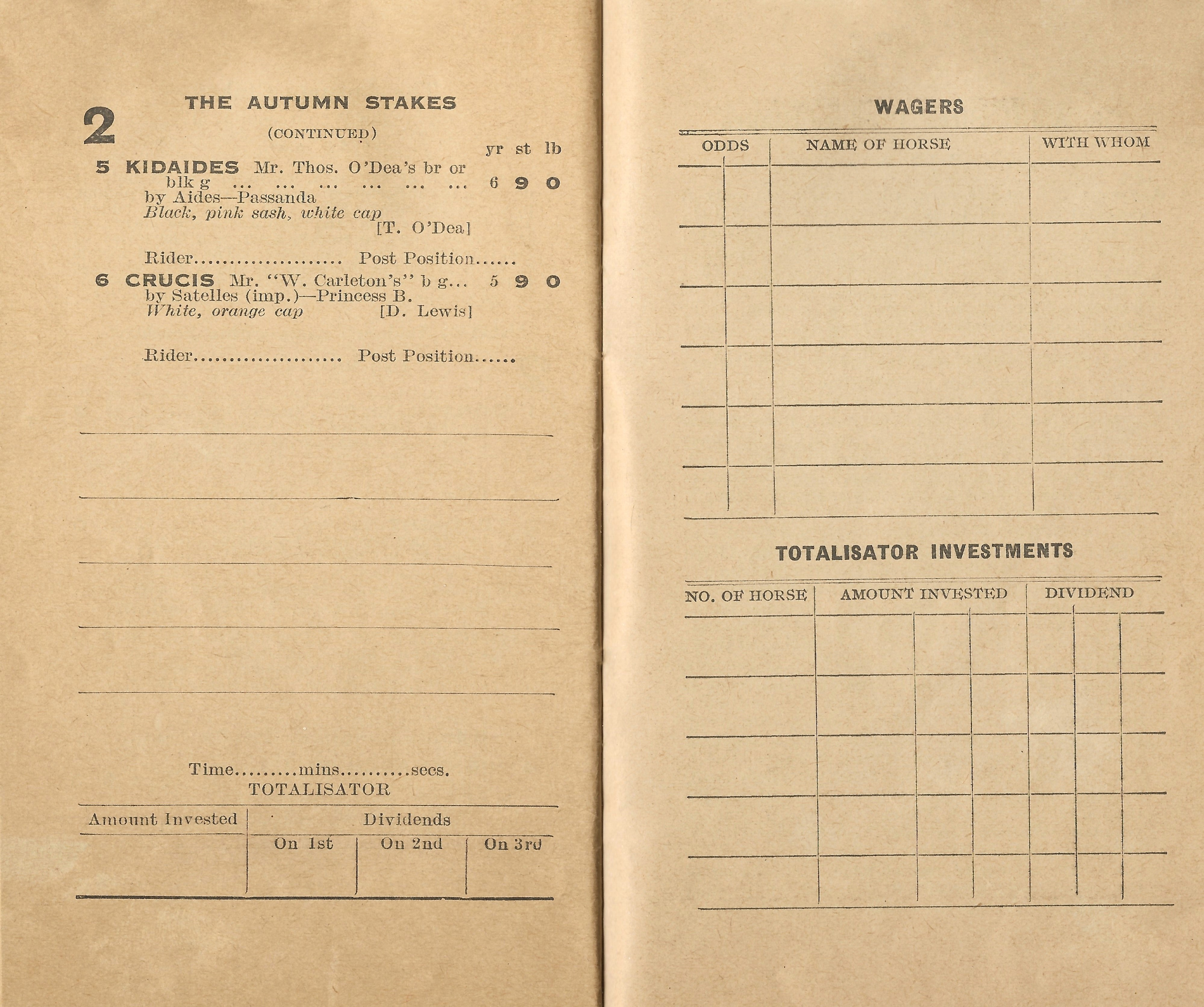
1930 AJC Autumn Stakes page starters and results

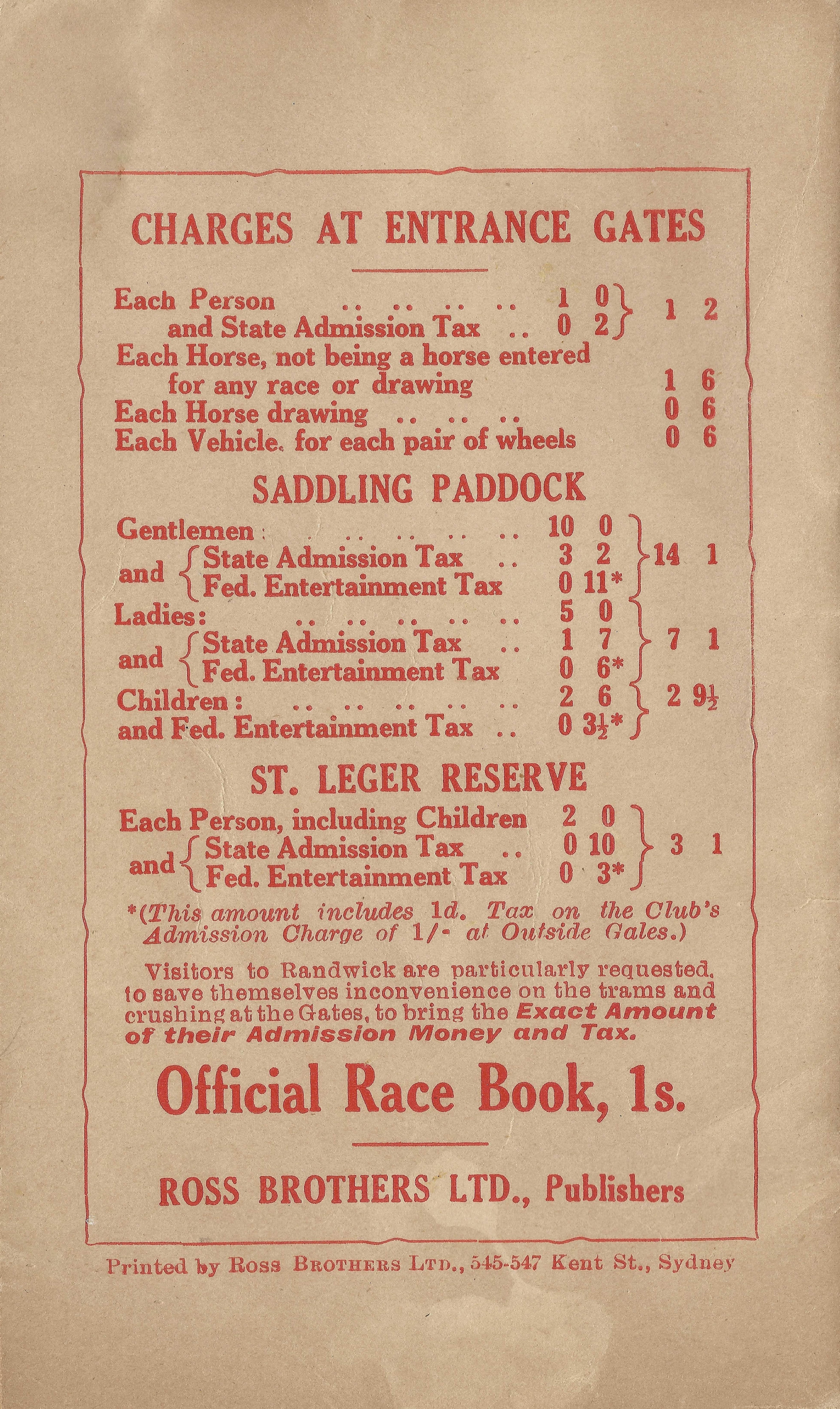
Back cover showing charges at the entrance gates

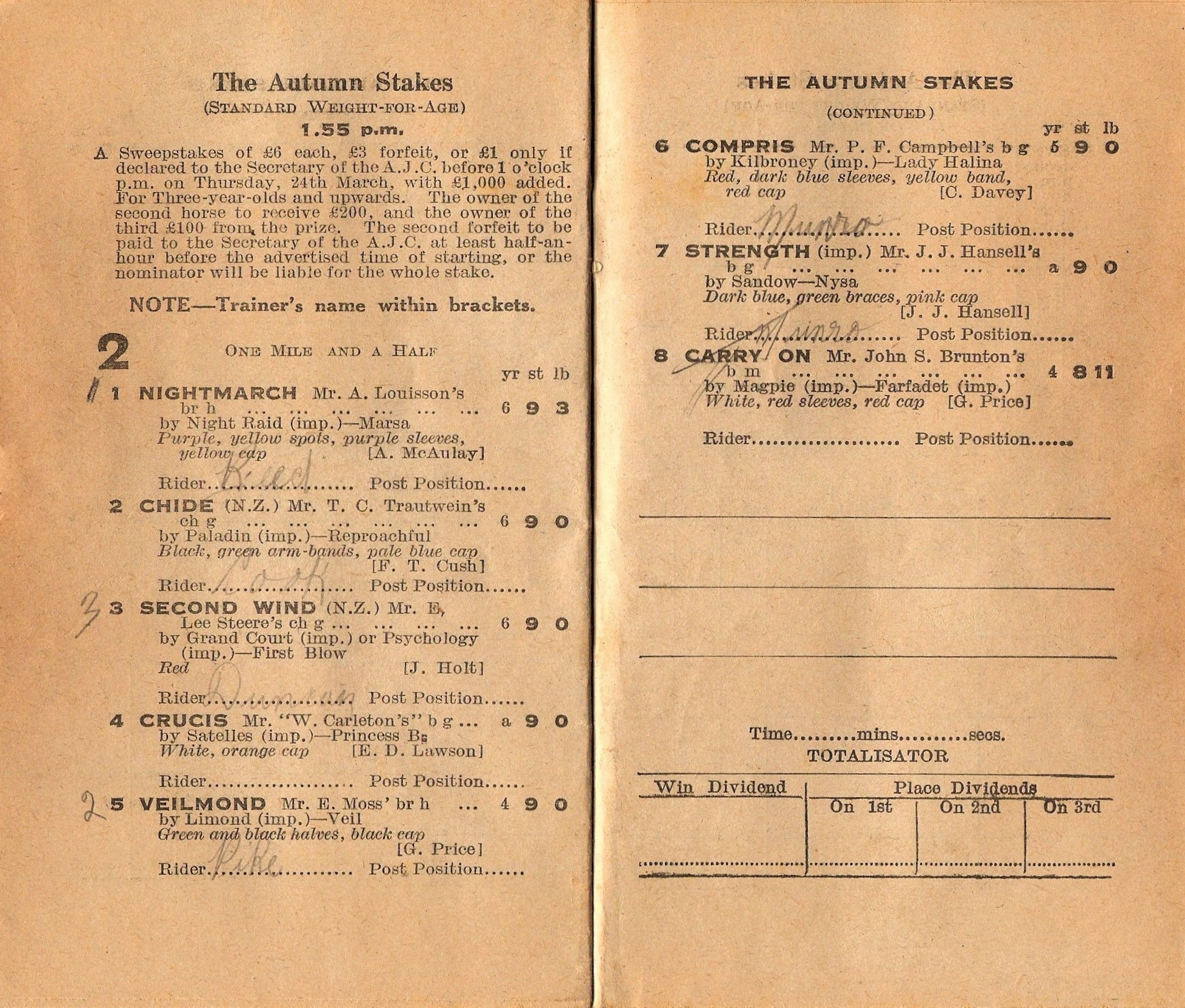
1932 AJC Autumn Stakes racebook page showing the winner, Nightmarch

== Stud record ==
Nightmarch stood at stud in New Zealand, where his matings with the Limond mare Praise produced these important winners:

- Regal Praise (won ARC Great Northern Oaks and ARC Great Northern St. Leger Stakes)
- Representative (AvJC Avondale Guineas, ARC Great Northern Guineas and AvJC Avondale Cup)
- Russian Ballet (ARC Great Northern Champagne Stakes and Wanganui Guineas)
- Serenata (WRC Summer Handicap and 1940 New Zealand Cup)

He was the sire of winners of more than £110,000 in stakes and died in October 1954, aged twenty-nine years old.

== See also ==
- Thoroughbred racing in New Zealand
