= 1900 Melbourne Cup =

Edition of the Melbourne Cup

- Melbourne Cup
- Location: Flemington Racecourse
- Date: 6 Nov 1900
- Distance: 2 miles
- Winning horse: Clean Sweep
- Winning time: 3:29.0
- Final odds: 20/1
- Jockey: A. Richardson
- Trainer: James Scobie
- Owner: Frank Cumming, F T Forrest
- Surface: Turf

The 1900 Melbourne Cup was a two-mile handicap horse race which took place on Tuesday, 6 November 1900.

This race saw a 28-horse field compete. James Scobie a former Steeplechase jockey turned trainer had the first two placegetters after Clean Sweep beat Maltster by one and a half lengths; 25-1 shot Alix was third. Clean Sweep had won the Coongy Handicap at Caulfield before winning the Moonee Valley Cup at Moonee Valley. Jockey Andrew 'Dingo' Richardson only got the ride on Clean Sweep after Bobby Lewis who had his choice of all four of Scobie's runner choose Maltster who had won both the Australian Derby and Victoria Derby.

This is the list of placegetters for the 1900 Melbourne Cup.

Place	Name	Jockey	Trainer	Owner
1	Clean Sweap	A. Richardson	James Scobie	Frank Cumming, F T Forrest
2	Malster	R. Lewis	James Scobie	
3	Alix	W. Dunford	T Brown	

== See also ==
- Melbourne Cup
- List of Melbourne Cup winners
- Victoria Racing Club
