= 1929 Melbourne Cup =

Edition of the Melbourne Cup

- Melbourne Cup
- Location: Flemington Racecourse
- Date: 5 Nov 1929
- Distance: 2 miles
- Winning horse: Nightmarch
- Winning time: 3:26.5
- Final odds: 6/1
- Jockey: R. Reed
- Trainer: A. McAulay
- Surface: Turf

The 1929 Melbourne Cup was a two-mile handicap horse race which took place on Tuesday, 5 November 1929.

This race saw a 14-horse field compete. This year's Melbourne Cup was best remembered for Phar Lap who had won the Australian Derby and Victoria Derby carrying 47 kg. The three-year-old refused to settle under Bobby Lewis and only ran third behind fellow Night Raid-sired horse, Nightmarch, which also won the Epsom Handicap. Nightmarch became the first horse to win the Cup and the W. S. Cox Plate in the same year.

This is the list of placegetters for the 1929 Melbourne Cup.

Place	Name	Jockey	Trainer
1	Nightmarch	R. Reed	A. McAulay
2	Paquito	M. McCarten	F. D. Jones
3	Phar Lap	Bobby Lewis	Harry R. Telford

== See also ==
- Melbourne Cup
- List of Melbourne Cup winners
- Victoria Racing Club
