= 1924 Melbourne Cup =

Edition of the Melbourne Cup

- Melbourne Cup
- Location: Flemington Racecourse
- Date: 4 Nov 1924
- Distance: 2 miles
- Winning horse: Backwood
- Winning time: 3:26.50
- Final odds: 8/1
- Jockey: P. Brown
- Trainer: R. Bradfield
- Surface: Turf

The 1924 Melbourne Cup was a two-mile handicap horse race which took place on Tuesday, 4 November 1924.

== Background ==
This edition of the Melbourne Cup was controversial. A new concrete grandstand at Flemington, was for members only with many believing that it favored the privileged. However, the main controversy came as a result if the 12-month disqualification of owners George Tye and J.R. Corteen, trainer C. T. Godby and jockey H. Cairns after a retrospective enquiry into the Coogny Handicap, Purser, a horse owned and trained by Tye, Corteen and Godby was determined by the stewards not to have been allowed to do its best when it finished 11th before being backed from 50/1 to 15/1 and winning the Caulfield Cup. Because of this, all horses belonging to the disqualified parties were barred from racing including three-year-old Heroic who was at the time favourite for both the VRC Derby and the Melbourne Cup. Stand By became the favourite after winning the Moonee Valley Cup but eased do to a rumour that the horse had broken down. Stand By was seen with his off-rear fetlock bandaged and he was barely able to put weight on it and as a result Spearfelt started favourite. Nevertheless, he raced, and had he not been blocked by a wall of horses down the straight he may have won. English horse Backwood defeated the all but lame Stand By and Spearfelt ran third.

This is the list of placegetters for the 1924 Melbourne Cup.

Place	Name	Jockey	Trainer
1	Backwood	P. Brown	R. Bradfield
2	Stand By	R. Lewis	J. Scobie
3	Spearfelt	E. O'Sullivan	V. O'Neil

== See also ==
- Melbourne Cup
- List of Melbourne Cup winners
- Victoria Racing Club
