= Robert Lewis (jockey) =

Australian Jockey

Personal information
- Nationality: Australian
- Born: 30 November 1878 Clunes, Victoria; Australia
- Died: 31 March 1947 (aged 68) Glenroy, Victoria, Australia
- Occupation: Jockey
- Spouse: Mary Irene
- Children: 2

Horse racing career
- Sport: Horse racing
- Career wins: 900+

Major racing wins
- Melbourne Cup (1902, 1915, 1919, 1927); Caulfield Cup (1916, 1926); AJC Derby (1900, 1901, 1904, 1927); Victoria Derby (1900, 1901, 1904, 1908, 1912, 1914, 1921, 1927); The Metropolitan (1912)

Honours
- Sport Australia Hall of Fame; Australian Racing Hall of Fame; Bobbie Lewis Quality

Significant horses
- The Victory, Patrobas, Artilleryman, Trivalve, Phar Lap
- Updated on 24 January 2025

Robert "Bobby/Bobbie" Lewis (30 November 1878 – 31 March 1947) was an Australian jockey of the late 19th century to the early 20th century. During his 46-year career span from 1892 to 1938 he won over 900 races including the Melbourne Cup in 1902, 1915, 1919 and 1927. He also won eight Victoria Derbies, four Australian Derbies, seven Crown Oaks and eight AJC St. Legers.

== Early life ==
Lewis was born in Clunes, Victoria, a small town north of Ballarat on 30 November 1878 to Thomas Lewis, and Martha Ann (née Miller).

== Career ==
Lewis won his first race on the Clunes racing course in 1892 at age 14 in a pony event and his first metropolitan in Melbourne in 1895. In 1899 Lewis begin a 40-year association with the master-trainer Jim Scobie. Lewis would find much success with Scobie's horses winning the 1927 Melbourne Cup on Trivalve and the Victoria Derby on Malster (1900), Hautvilliers (1901), Sylvanite (1904), Alawa (1908), Wolawa (1912), and Trivalve (1927).

At 17 years old, Lewis would race in the 1895 Melbourne Cup on Onward, finishing among the tail enders in the thirty six horse field. He had unplaced finishes in the next four Melbourne Cups, before placing for the first time in the 1900 Melbourne Cup. Lewis would achieve his first Melbourne Cup on The Victory in the 1902 Melbourne Cup, helped by the scratching of champion mare Wakeful. Lewis would have six more unplaced finishes in the Cup, before placing second in the 1909 Melbourne Cup on Alawa, three lengths behind Prince Foote.

In the 1915 Melbourne Cup Lewis replaced jockey William Smart on the three year old Patrobas as the jockey couldn't make the Cup weight of 7st 6 lbs (47 kg). Lewis finished first earning him his second Melbourne Cup.

Lewis' third Melbourne Cup win was in the 1919 Melbourne Cup on the stallion Artilleryman. In winning the 1919 Melbourne Cup, lewis set a new race record time of 3 minutes 24.5 seconds. He secured victory by at least six lengths ahead of Richmond Main. Lewis in the following years would see a decreases in his racing wins but would maintain consistent placings through the 1920s and early 1930s. Lewis placed second in the 1924 Melbourne Cup on Stand By. In 1926 lewis won the Caulfield Cup on Manfred but did not race in the 1926 Melbourne Cup. In 1927 Lewis placed first in both the 1927 Victoria Derby and 1927 Melbourne Cup on Trivalve. His four Melbourne Cup wins constitute a record that has only been equalled by Harry White, but never bettered.

In the 1929 Melbourne Cup Lewis rode the favourite Phar Lap after jockey Jim Pike was unable to get below the weight limit of 7st 6lbs (47 kg), where he was expected to achieve his fifth Cup. Phar Lap was the shortest priced Cup favourite ever, at the time, due to his recent back to back wins in the Australian Derby and Victoria Derby in record times. The three-year-old refused to settle under Bobby Lewis and only ran third behind fellow Night Raid-sired horse, Nightmarch. Punters lost an estimated 1 million pounds as a result and it was suggested that Lewis conspired with his friend and punter Eric Connolly to lose on purpose.

Lewis did not race in 1930 Melbourne Cup. In the 1931 Melbourne Cup lewis rode Prince Dayton to sixth place. This was the last Cup, Lewis would ride in and was not offered another Cup ride. Lewis continued to ride professionally for another seven years before retiring from horse racing in 1938.

== Personal life ==
On 15 June 1920, Lewis married Mary Irene, née Rowntree, at Christ Church, Hamilton, whom to which he had two daughters. After retiring from horse racing in 1938 he become a grazier with properties in Glenroy and Ferntree Gully until his death on 31 March 1947.

== Legacy ==
In 1974, the Victoria Racing Club named a Group 2, Thoroughbred quality handicap horse race in his honour, the Bobbie Lewis Quality Handicap (now shortened to just Bobbie Lewis Quality).

On 9 December 1986, Lewis was inducted into the Sport Australia Hall of Fame for his achievements in the sport of Horse Racing.

In 2002, Lewis was inducted into the Australian Racing Hall of Fame for his achievements in the sport of Horse Racing.
