= Trivalve =

Australian thoroughbred racehorse

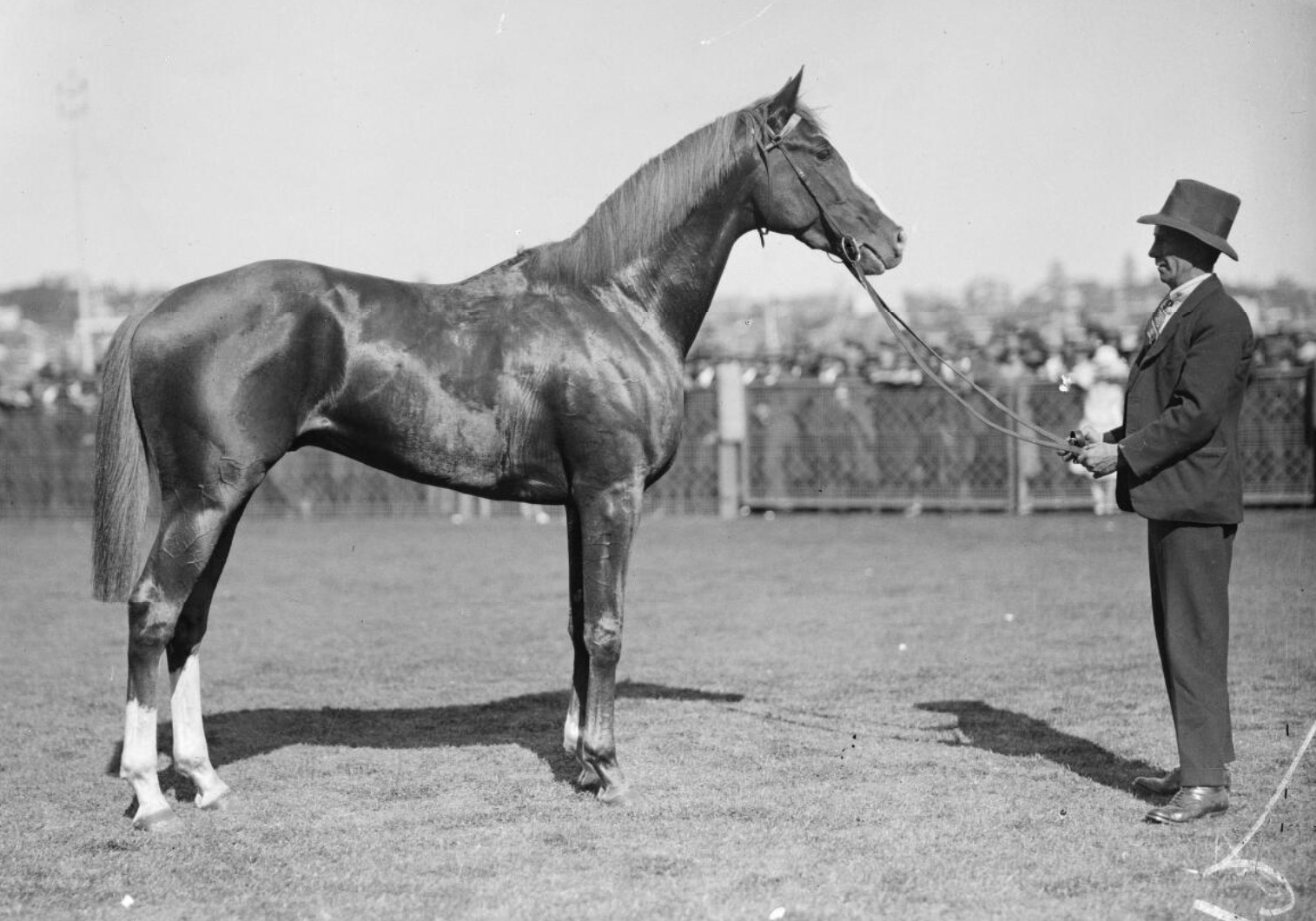
- Trivalve, about 1930
- Sire: Cyklon
- Grandsire: Spearmint
- Dam: Trey
- Damsire: The Welkin
- Sex: Stallion
- Foaled: 1924
- Died: 1941
- Country: Australia
- Colour: Chestnut
- Breeder: Ernest Clarke
- Owner: Ernest Clarke
- Trainer: James Scobie
- Record: 20: 8–3–5

Major wins
- AJC Derby (1927); Victoria Derby (1927); Melbourne Cup (1927); VRC St Leger (1928)

Trivalve (1924−1941) was an Australian race horse that won the 1927 Melbourne Cup.

== Racing career ==
In 1927 Trivalve was successful in the AJC Derby, Victoria Derby and the Melbourne Cup. The win in the Cup gave trainer James Scobie and jockey Bobbie Lewis their fourth Melbourne Cup successes. Trivalve won career prize money of £28,375.

== Stud career ==
Trivalve was retired to stud but proved an unsuccessful sire failing to sire any stakes winners. Trivalve was eventually sold on as a station sire and reportedly died of snakebite in the Northern Territory in 1941, having been sold twice that year for 7 guineas and 9 guineas.

== Pedigree ==
Pedigree of Trivalve (AUS) 1924
Sire Cyklon (IRE) 1910	Spearmint (GB); 1903	Carbine*	Musket*
Sire Cyklon (IRE) 1910	Spearmint (GB); 1903	Carbine*	Mersey*
Sire Cyklon (IRE) 1910	Spearmint (GB); 1903	Maid of the Mint	Minting
Sire Cyklon (IRE) 1910	Spearmint (GB); 1903	Maid of the Mint	Warble
Sire Cyklon (IRE) 1910	Cyanean (GB); 1902	Cyllene	Bona Vista
Sire Cyklon (IRE) 1910	Cyanean (GB); 1902	Cyllene	Arcadia
Sire Cyklon (IRE) 1910	Cyanean (GB); 1902	Nenemoosha	Hagioscope
Sire Cyklon (IRE) 1910	Cyanean (GB); 1902	Nenemoosha	Wenonah
Dam Trey (AUS) 1917	The Welkin (GB); 1904	Flying Fox	Orme
Dam Trey (AUS) 1917	The Welkin (GB); 1904	Flying Fox	Vampire
Dam Trey (AUS) 1917	The Welkin (GB); 1904	Woodbury	Crowberry
Dam Trey (AUS) 1917	The Welkin (GB); 1904	Woodbury	The Widgeon
Dam Trey (AUS) 1917	Teppo (GB); 1908	Ladas	Hampton
Dam Trey (AUS) 1917	Teppo (GB); 1908	Ladas	Illuminata
Dam Trey (AUS) 1917	Teppo (GB); 1908	Dum Dum	Carbine*
Dam Trey (AUS) 1917	Teppo (GB); 1908	Dum Dum	Charm

* Trivalve is inbred 3S x 4D to the stallion Carbine, meaning that he appears third generation on the sire side of his pedigree, and fourth generation on the dam side of his pedigree.
