= Tom Corrigan (jockey) =

Thomas Corrigan (1851 or May 1854 – 14 August 1894), invariably known as "Tom" or "Tommy", was an Australian steeplechase jockey who died as a result of injuries sustained while racing.

== History ==
Corrigan was born in County Meath, Ireland, and emigrated to Australia with his parents Thomas Corrigan and Bridget Corrigan née Carney in 1864.

Seth Ferry reports meeting Corrigan at Casterton in 1867 when the lad was working as a butcher's boy. Much taken with the boy, the noted horse trainer gave him an injured chestnut in exchange for a basket of supplies. After winning a hack steeplechase race at his home town Woodford, Victoria on his mare Juliet, he was employed to ride for trainer William Tozer of nearby Warrnambool. At the Spring meeting of the V.R.C., 1 November 1867 at Flemington, he rode Tozer's horse B.A. in the Maiden Plate, finishing second to the odds-on favourite, C. B. Fisher's Sylvia.

In 1872 he rode in the Melbourne Cup.

In 1877 he began riding for Martin Loughlin, which partnership lasted around ten years, then raced, less successfully, on his own account at Caulfield and later for G. Russell.

In the course of his career he rode 238 winners out of a total of 788 mounts, and was only 319 times unplaced, and his mounts won £38,825 in stake money. During his best season, that of 1880–81, he rode 21 winners out of a total of 39 mounts, and was only eight times unplaced. Horses with whom he was notably associated include Lone Hand, Postboy, Cronstadt, Hotspur, Game, Sir Wilfred, Sailor, Left Bower, Blue Jacket, Lord Harry, Twilight, Adonis, Sussex, Kildare, Native, and Great Western.

He was often compared with flats jockey Tom Hales for his integrity, skill and courage, and was similarly popular with both racegoers and the general public. During his career of 28 years he lodged remarkably few protests, and fewer still were lodged against him. A notable exception was at Flemington in 1888 when he momentarily lost control of Kangaroo, with the result that Ruby, ridden by fellow Ballarat jockey (and later a distinguished trainer) James Scobie was "squeezed", and after a protest Corrigan was disqualified. Though both jockeys continued to behave impeccably towards each other on the racecourse, personal relations between them were frosty for some time.

He suffered severe brain injuries on Saturday 11 August 1894 during the running of the VATC Grand National Steeplechase when his horse Waiter fell. He died the following Tuesday without regaining consciousness. His funeral cortege, let by 150 trainers and jockeys on foot, was the largest seen in Melbourne to that time. Among the thousands of tributes was a wreath from his Excellency the Governor, Lord Hopetoun, for whom Corrigan was a particular favourite.

Despite career earnings of some £15,000, Corrigan died destitute, a fact Ferry attributes to speculation on the Stock Exchange and subsequent losses in the 1890s depression. Ferry contends that otherwise Corrigan would have retired and not continue pushing his luck. A subscription was raised by the VATC for the benefit of his widow and family.

His death was followed two months later by that of another highly respected jumps jockey, Martin Burke (c. 1855–1894). Of a similar age, both hailed from County Meath and had careers in Western Victoria, but there the similarity ended, for while Corrigan had only one previous bad fall, Burke had hardly an unbroken bone in his body.

== Recognition ==
- The Tommy Corrigan Medal for jumps jockeys was named in his memory.
- In 2017 he was inducted to the Australian Racing Hall of Fame.

== Family ==
Thomas Corrigan married Robena Jamieson (c. 1870 – 18 May 1947), sister of jockey Dan Jamieson, at St. Francis' Church, Melbourne on 14 January 1891. They had three children, one after Tom's death:

- Tom Corrigan, jun ( – ), was a printer and stationery manufacturer in Melbourne who excelled at cricket, football (several codes), and billiards. He never married.
- Ruby Corrigan (12 August 1893 – ) married Ormond A. Lording, lived at Brighton, Victoria
- Lawrence Corrigan (4 February 1895 – ) later known as Brother Urban Corrigan M.A., Dip.Ed., teacher at New Norcia, Western Australia, science master at St Joseph's College, Hunters Hill, and master at the Assumption College, Kilmore. He was the author of History of Catholic Education in New South Wales (Angus and Robertson, 1930).

Their home was at Kambrook Road, Caulfield; Robena lived her last years with son Tom, junior at Addison Street, St. Kilda.
