= 1902 Melbourne Cup =

Annual horse race in Victoria, Australia

- Melbourne Cup
- Location: Flemington Racecourse
- Date: 4 November 1902
- Distance: 2 miles
- Winning horse: The Victory
- Winning time: 3:29.0
- Final odds: 25/1
- Jockey: R. Lewis
- Trainer: R Bradfield
- Owner: Clark & Robinson
- Surface: Turf
- Attendance: 75,000

The 1902 Melbourne Cup was a two-mile handicap horse race which took place on Tuesday, 4 November 1902.

Bobbie Lewis, the winning jockey would go on to win four Melbourne Cups.

This year was the forty-second running of the Melbourne Cup.

This is the list of placegetters for the 1902 Melbourne Cup.

Place	Name	Jockey	Trainer	Owner
1	The Victory	Bobbie Lewis	R Bradfield	Clark & Robinson
2	Vanity Fair	C. Cooper	F. Musgrave	
3	Abundance	W. Jennings	F. McGrath	
4	Acrasia	G M Hough		

== See also ==
- Melbourne Cup
- List of Melbourne Cup winners
- Victoria Racing Club
