= 1909 Melbourne Cup =

Edition of the Melbourne Cup

- Melbourne Cup
- Location: Flemington Racecourse
- Date: 2 Nov 1909
- Distance: 2 miles
- Winning horse: Prince Foote
- Winning time: 3:27.50
- Final odds: 4/1
- Jockey: William McLachlan
- Trainer: Frank McGrath
- Surface: Turf
- Attendance: 100,000

The 1909 Melbourne Cup was a two-mile handicap horse race which took place on Tuesday, 2 November 1909.

The race was won by Prince Foote, considered one of the greatest colts in Australian racing history. He achieved a 'clean sweep' of three-year old classics in 1909–10: VRC St Leger, AJC St Leger and VRC Champion Stakes, as well as the 1909 Melbourne Cup. Prince Foote started the 4/1 equal favourite with Sydney Cup winner Trafalgar. He won and defeated 1908 VRC Derby winner Alawa, ridden by Bobby Lewis by three lengths. At 100/1 odds Aberdeen ran third and Trafalgar finished fourth. A silver centerpiece was awarded to the owners of Prince Foote, which was ridden by Bill 'Midge' McLachlan, the great-grandfather of future five-time Melbourne Cup winning trainer Lee Freedman.

This is the list of placegetters for the 1909 Melbourne Cup.

Place	Name	Jockey	Trainer
1	Prince Foote	William McLachlan	Frank McGrath
2	Alawa	Bobbie Lewis	J. Scobbie
3	Aberdeen	F. Harmer	H. Connelly

== See also ==
- Melbourne Cup
- List of Melbourne Cup winners
- Victoria Racing Club
