= James Scobie (horseman) =

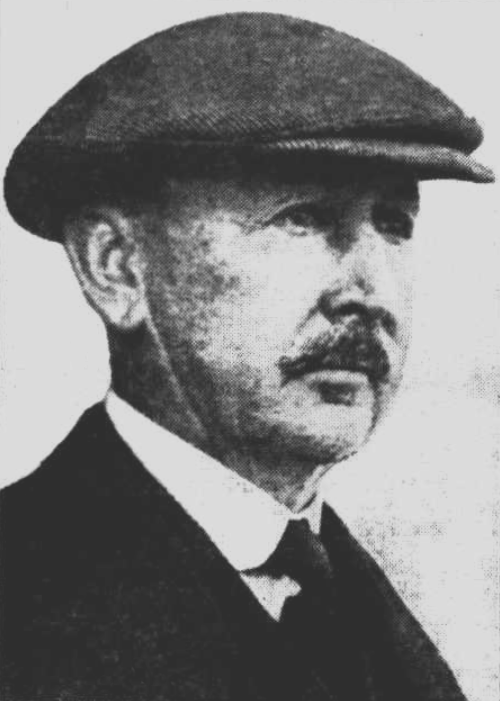
- James Scobie, 1922

Personal information
- Born: 18 July 1860 Ararat, Victoria, Australia
- Died: 6 October 1940 (aged 80) Melbourne, Victoria, Australia
- Occupations: Jockey; Horse trainer

Horse racing career
- Sport: Horse racing
- Career wins: 4x Melbourne Cup; 8x Victoria Derby

James Scobie (18 July 1860 – 6 October 1940) was an Australian jockey and racehorse trainer. He was an inaugural inductee to the Australian Racing Hall of Fame in 2001.

== History ==
Scobie was born in Ararat, Victoria, or perhaps nearby Moyston, a son of stonemason William Scobie and his wife Marion Scobie, née McVicar. He was educated at Ararat, and at the age of 12 began working with horses. After a few months working for a surveyor, he fell in with Ralph Parkinson, just out of Ararat, working a chestnut gelding Alma (previously named Postboy) that won a lot of races for his owner. After three years with Howie, during which time his focus changed from riding to training, and he purchased the business, training horses for such wealthy owners as Andrew Chirnside, Loughlin, E. E. D. Clarke, Sir Rupert Clarke, R. G. Casey, M. Gordon, J. V. Smith, J. N. McArthur, S. P. Mackay (of Western Australia) and Cato. He built new stables, and trained such celebrities as Annesley, Blue Mountain, Collingwood, Corythus, Dreamland, Euchre, Insolvent, Irralee, Ringwood, Ruby, St. Louis, Titan, and many others, winning four Grand Nationals, Australian Cup, Caulfield Guineas, Hobart Cup, the Maribyrnong Plate, Ballarat Cup three times, and many other races; while Titan, who had been written off by others as a failure, won him the Toorak Handicap, Railway Stakes, All-aged Stakes, and Farewell Handicap at Flemington, and the Cumberland Stakes in Sydney. Scobie considered Ringwood the best horse he ever rode or trained, despite the successes he had with Blue Mountain, Bolton, Kanaka, Lothair, Ruby, and Zephyr.

During his remarkable career he won £250,000 in stakes, and the victories of horses under his care included four Melbourne Cups. His most important success in later years was the Australia Day Cup at Williamstown with Lusson, who was trained by him for longtime patron E. E. D. Clarke (1869–1941), son of Sir William John Clarke. Notable among his jockeys were Robert "Bobbie" Lewis (1878–1947) and Michael Carey (c. 1864–1908).

He had a long friendship with rival jumps jockey Tom Corrigan, which turned icy after an incident at Flemington in a steeplechase at the V.R.C. Autumn meeting of 1888 when Corrigan's horse Kangaroo inadvertently "squeezed" Scobie's Ruby. Corrigan was disqualified on protest and Scobie awarded the race.

He had stables at Miner's Rest, owned by E. E. D. Clarke at Dowling Forest, near Ballarat from around 1880 to 1911, though floods in 1909 forced a relocation to Caulfield, and Pytchley Lodge at Ascot Vale, opposite the Ascot racecourse, from 1911.

Notable horses that passed through his hands include: Alawa, Angelia, Annesley, Annotate, Benbow, Blue Mountain, Bolan, Brookong, Celia, Charles Stuart, Chit-Chat, Cyden, Cyklon, Demas, Deneb, Dreamland, Eleanor, Emir, Epilogue, Eye Glass, F.J.A., Fossil, Glue, Green Cap, Hautvilliers, Hua, Jack Smith, Kallara, Keera, Kildalton, La Carabine, Lothair, Maltster, Maroon, Midilli, Miltiades, Mint Sauce, Moe, Mother Goose, Orvieto, Paravane, Paul Pry, Pillie-winkle, Ranfurly, Recall, Ringwood, Rosanna, Rosina, Ruby, Seabound, Shanks, Shotbolt, Sinnang, Spica, Stageland, Stand By, Star d'Or, Sweet Nell, Sylvanite, Titan, The Bride, Thrice, Trey, Trillion, Uncle Matt, Thrice, United States, Wolowa, Widgiewa, Wycherley, Bitalli, Clean Sweep, King Ingoda and Trivalve; these last four being Melbourne Cup winners.

He set a record, which still stands, for the greatest number of Victoria Derby wins: in 1900, 1901, 1903, 1904, 1908, 1912, 1927, and 1937, "Bobbie" Lewis being the jockey in each year except 1903. Lewis rode four Melbourne Cup winners: The Victory (1902), Patrobas (1915), Artilleryman (1919) and Trivalve (1927), only the last being trained by Scobie. Lewis was later the object of suspicion when he rode the previously unbeaten Phar Lap to third place in the 1929 Melbourne Cup.

Scobie died at a private hospital in Melbourne, and his remains were cremated at Spring Vale; his ashes were interred in the grave of his wife in the Ballarat cemetery.

== Family ==
Scobie married Joan Shaw Paterson ( – ) on 2 February 1888. Their family included:

- Austin James Scobie (c. 1887 – 22 November 1939) married Beryl McLeay Smith on 21 August 1917. He was a trainer in conjunction with his father, and had a separate house on the Pytchley Lodge property.
- Norman Claude Scobie (9 January 1893 – 1986) married Marguerite Frances "Pearl" Doyle (1891–1945) before 1915. They divorced; he married again, to Gladys Germaine Smith ( – ) in November 1930. He was a trainer in Melbourne and in 1930 for Sir Charles Hyde in England.

They had a home at 140 Ascotvale Road, Flemington

His brother George Scobie, sen., ( – ) was a cross-country rider and trainer and father of George Scobie, a jockey who notably won the 1909 Grand National Hurdle Race on Fossil, and later also a trainer, and W. Scobie, who had some success as a jockey in New Zealand.

== Recognition ==
The great jockey universally known as Scobie Breasley was born Arthur Edward Breasley, and gained his nickname as a reference to James Scobie.

Noted trainer Dick Bradfield placed him among the ten best jockeys he had seen.

Scobie Place, Holt, Canberra, was named for him.

== Bibliography ==
James Scobie (1929) My Life on the Australian Turf, Specialty Press Ltd., Melbourne.

== See also ==
John N. Molony, 'Lewis, Robert (Bob) (1878–1947)', Australian Dictionary of Biography, National Centre of Biography, Australian National University, https://adb.anu.edu.au/biography/lewis-robert-bob-7189/text12431, published first in hardcopy 1986, accessed online 27 July 2017.
