= Australian Derby =

- Peter Pan, 1932 winner
- Class: Group 1
- Location: Randwick Racecourse; Sydney, Australia
- Inaugurated: 1861; 165 years ago (as Randwick Derby Stakes)
- Race type: Thoroughbred - Flat racing
- Website: Australian Jockey Club

Race information
- Distance: 2,400 metres (~1 1/2 miles)
- Surface: Turf
- Track: Right-handed
- Qualification: Three-year-olds
- Weight: Set Weights colts and geldings – 56 1/2 kg fillies – 54 1/2 kg
- Purse: A$2,000,000 (2025)
- Bonuses: Exempt from ballot in Queen Elizabeth Stakes

The Australian Derby is an Australian Turf Club Group 1 Thoroughbred horse race for three-year-olds at set weights held at Randwick Racecourse, Sydney, Australia in April, during the Autumn ATC Championships Carnival. The race is considered to be the top ranked event for three-year-olds in Australian and New Zealand race classifications.

== History ==
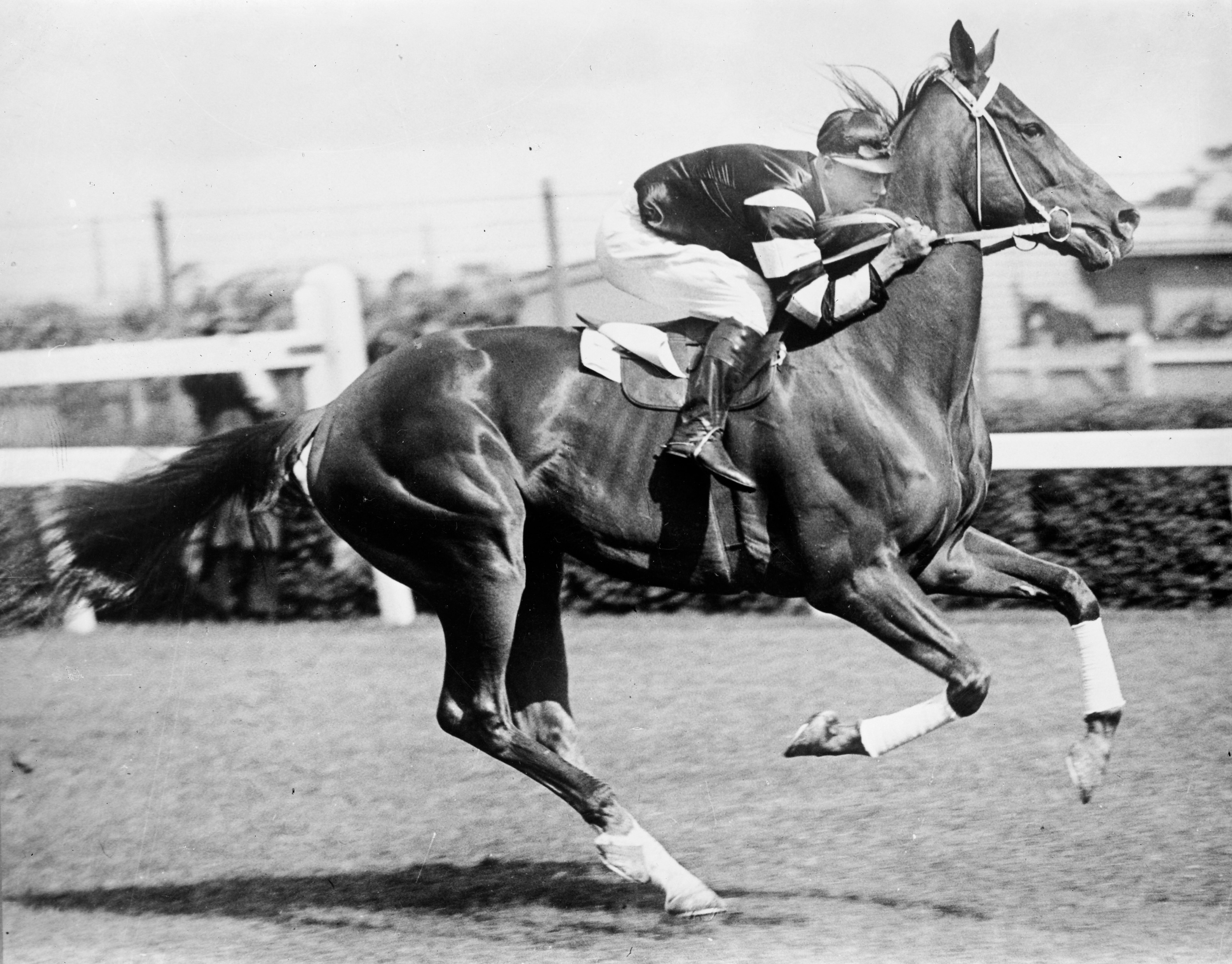
Phar Lap, 1929 winner Jockey Jim Pike

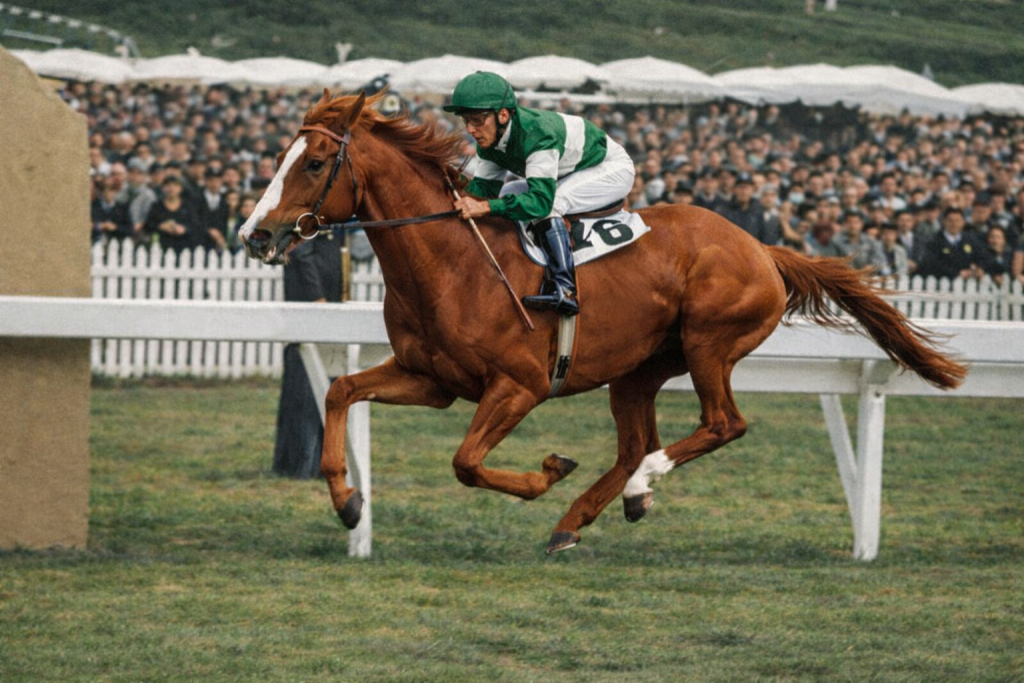
Carbon Copy, 1948 winner

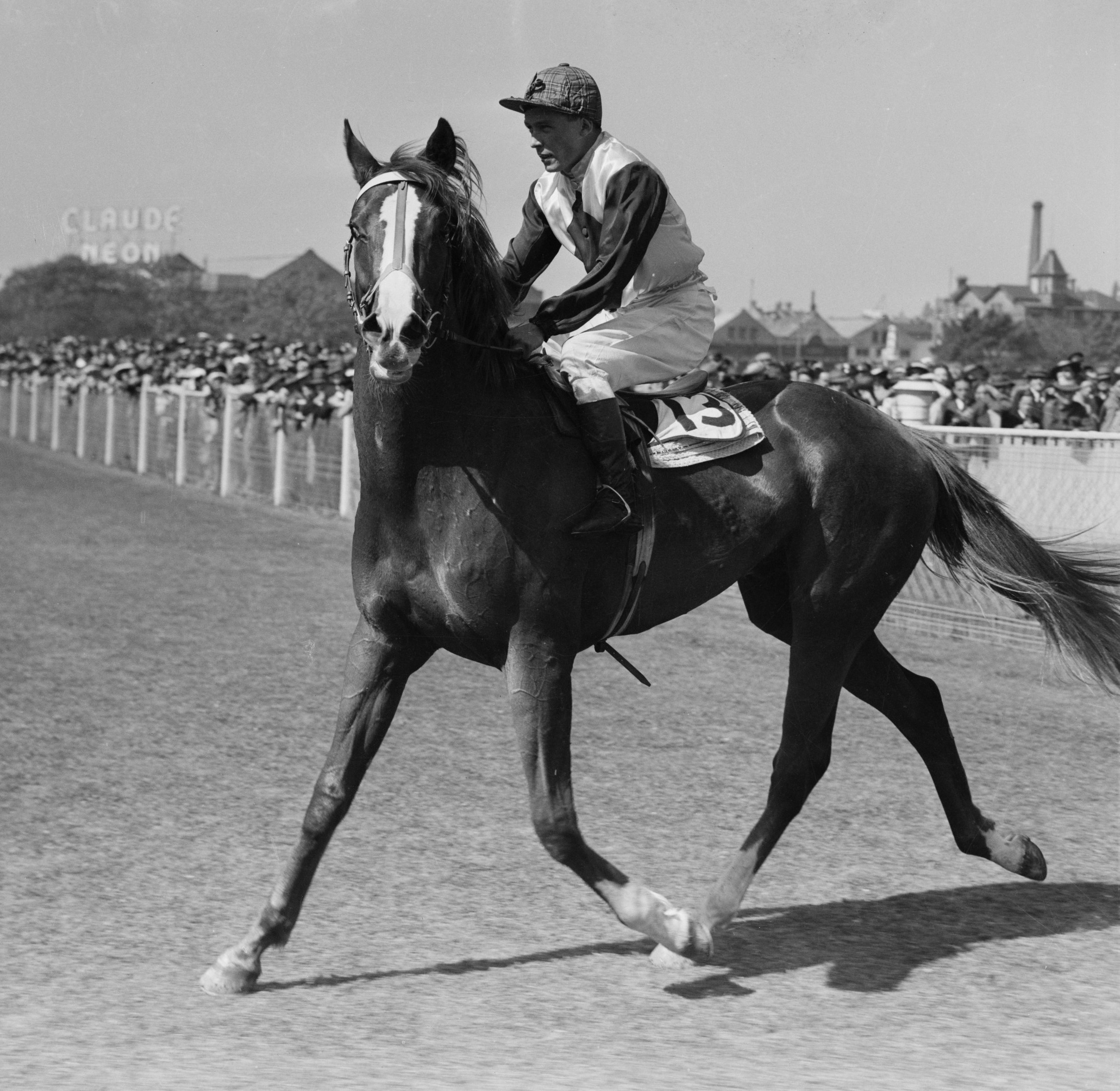
Magnificent, 1945 winner

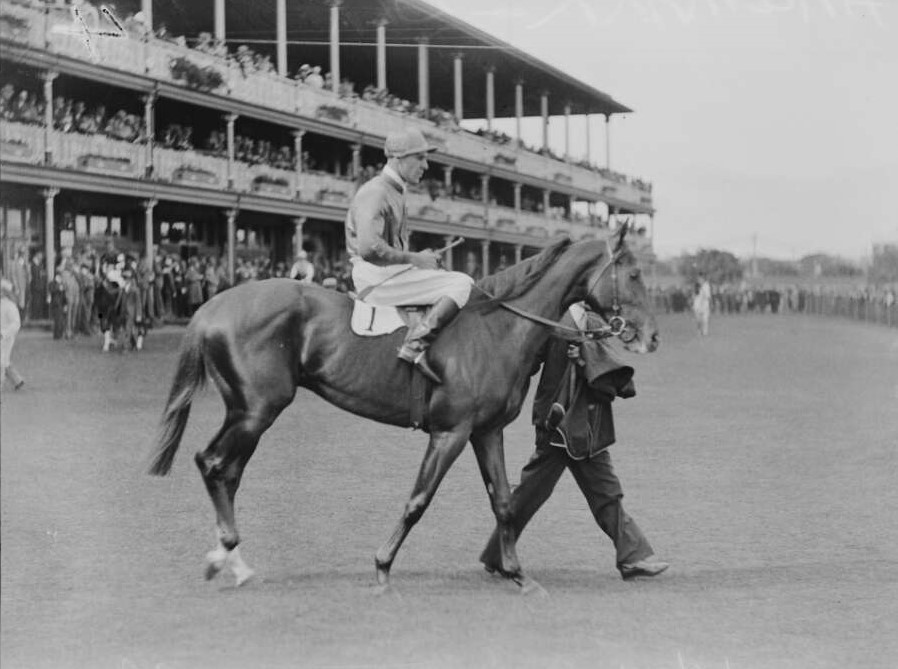
Hall Mark, 1933 winner

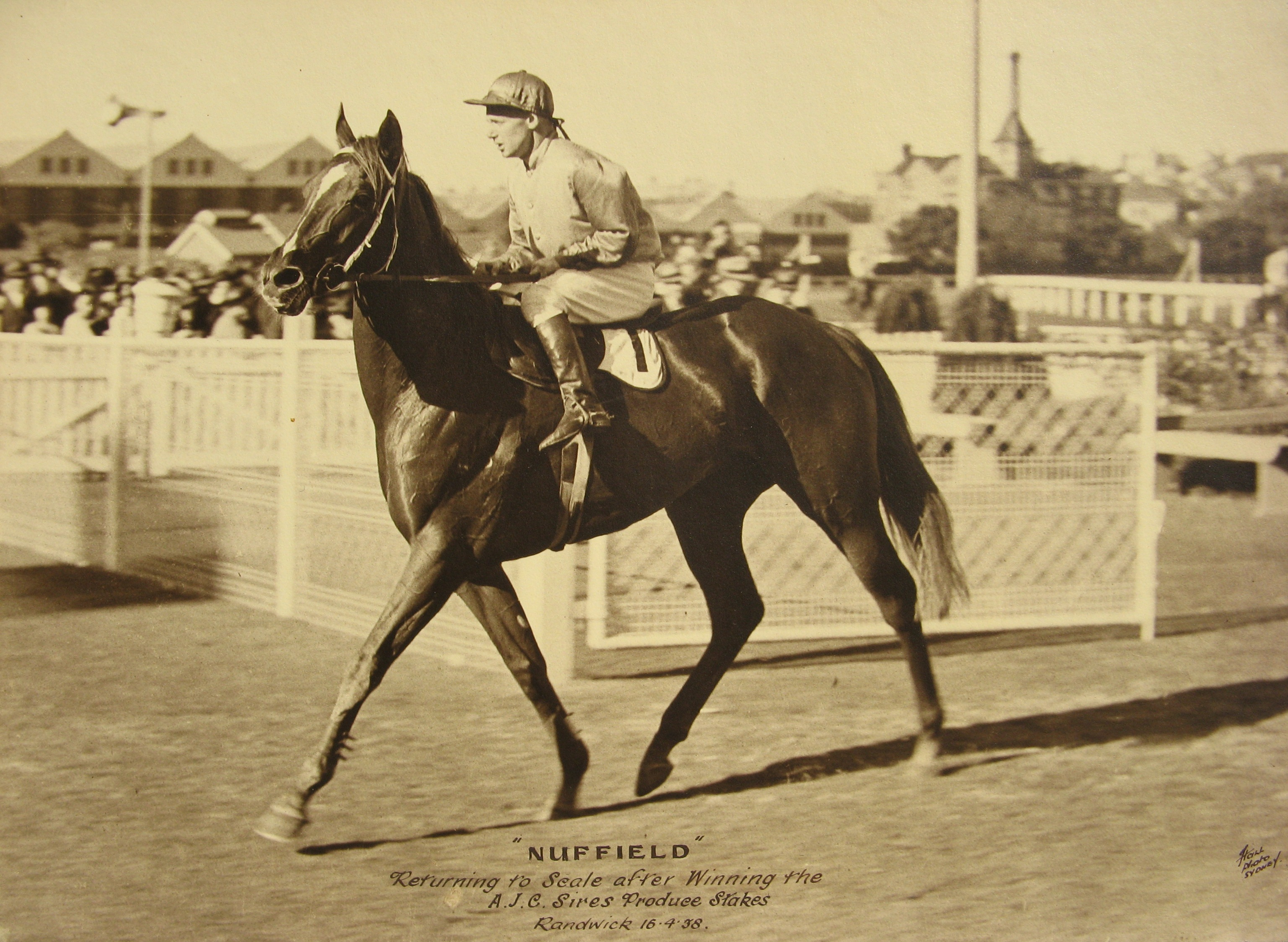
Nuffield, 1938 winner

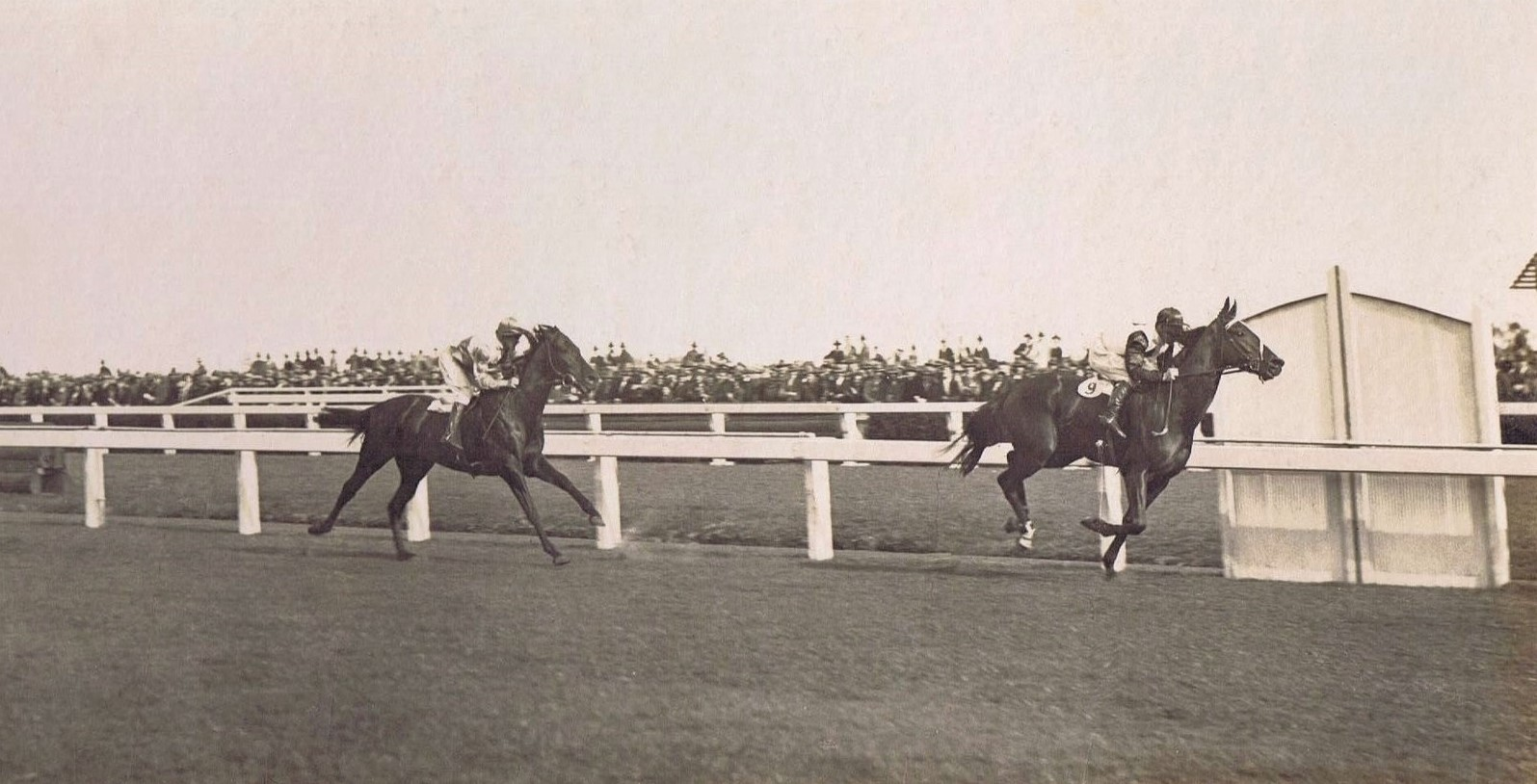
Ammon Ra, 1931 winner

=== Name ===
Inaugurated in 1861 as the AJC Randwick Derby Stakes, the first race was won by Kyogle, a grandson of the Touchstone who was a four-time Champion sire in Great Britain & Ireland. In 1865 the name of the race was changed to the AJC Australia Derby Stakes then from 1873 through 1993 it was called the AJC Derby. Although the race officially became the AJC Australian Derby in 1994, it is still commonly referred to as the AJC Derby.

The official records show that Prince Humphrey won the 1928 Derby, but he wasn't in the race. It was a horse called Cragsman, by the same sire but with a different dam. This substitution came to light when Dick Tate of Toowoomba saw a picture of the Derby winner and was aware that Prince Humphrey had different markings, and had photographs to prove it.

From 1932 to 1956, geldings were banned from competing in the Derby.

=== Distance ===
Originally run at a distance of 1 1/2 miles, in 1972 the race was changed to 2,400 metres (~11.93 furlongs) to conform to the metric system. In 1978 there was no race held and under a reorganisation, it was changed from a spring racing event to be run in the autumn beginning in 1979. Contested over 2,400 metres on a right-handed turf course, it has been won by some of the greats of the Australian turf, including Phar Lap, Tulloch, and Kingston Town.

== Records ==
Time record: (at current 2,400 metres distance)

- 2:28.41 - Octagonal (1996)

Largest winning margin:

- 10 lengths - Trident (1886)

Most wins by a jockey:

- 6 - Thomas Hales (1875, 1880, 1882, 1884, 1886, 1887)

=== 1934 and 1943 racebooks ===
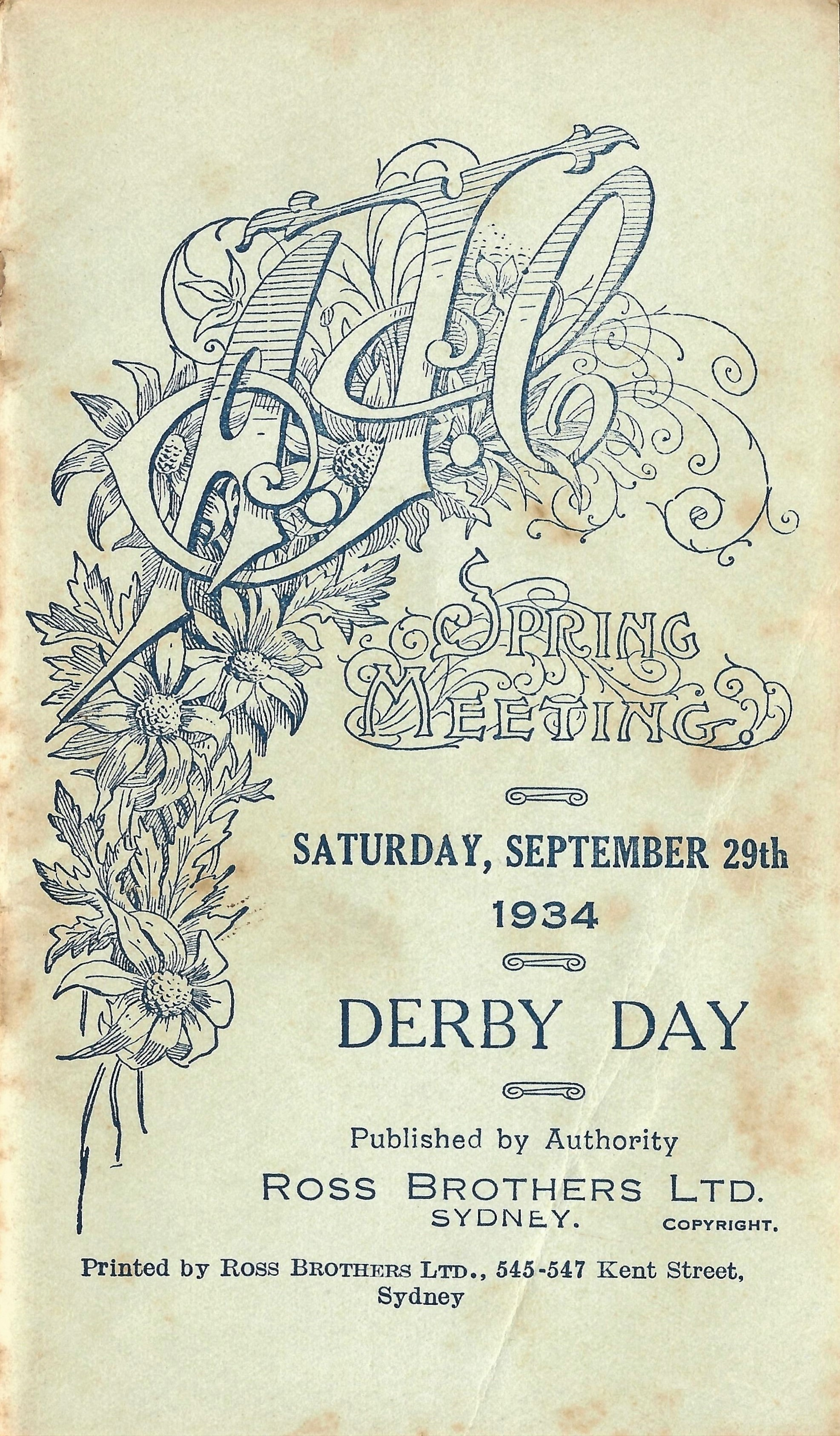
1934 AJC Derby racebook front cover

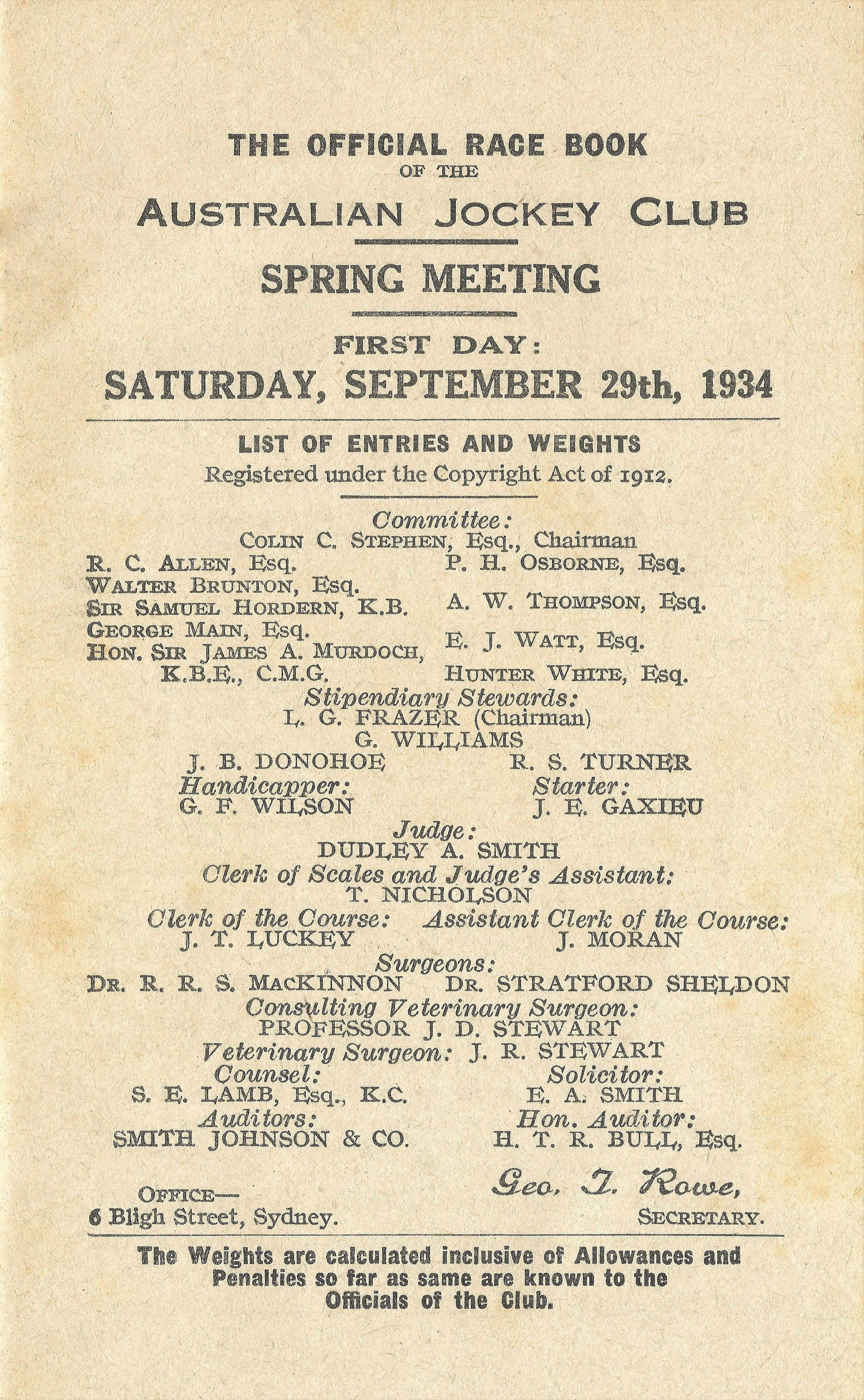
1934 AJC Derby showing raceday officials

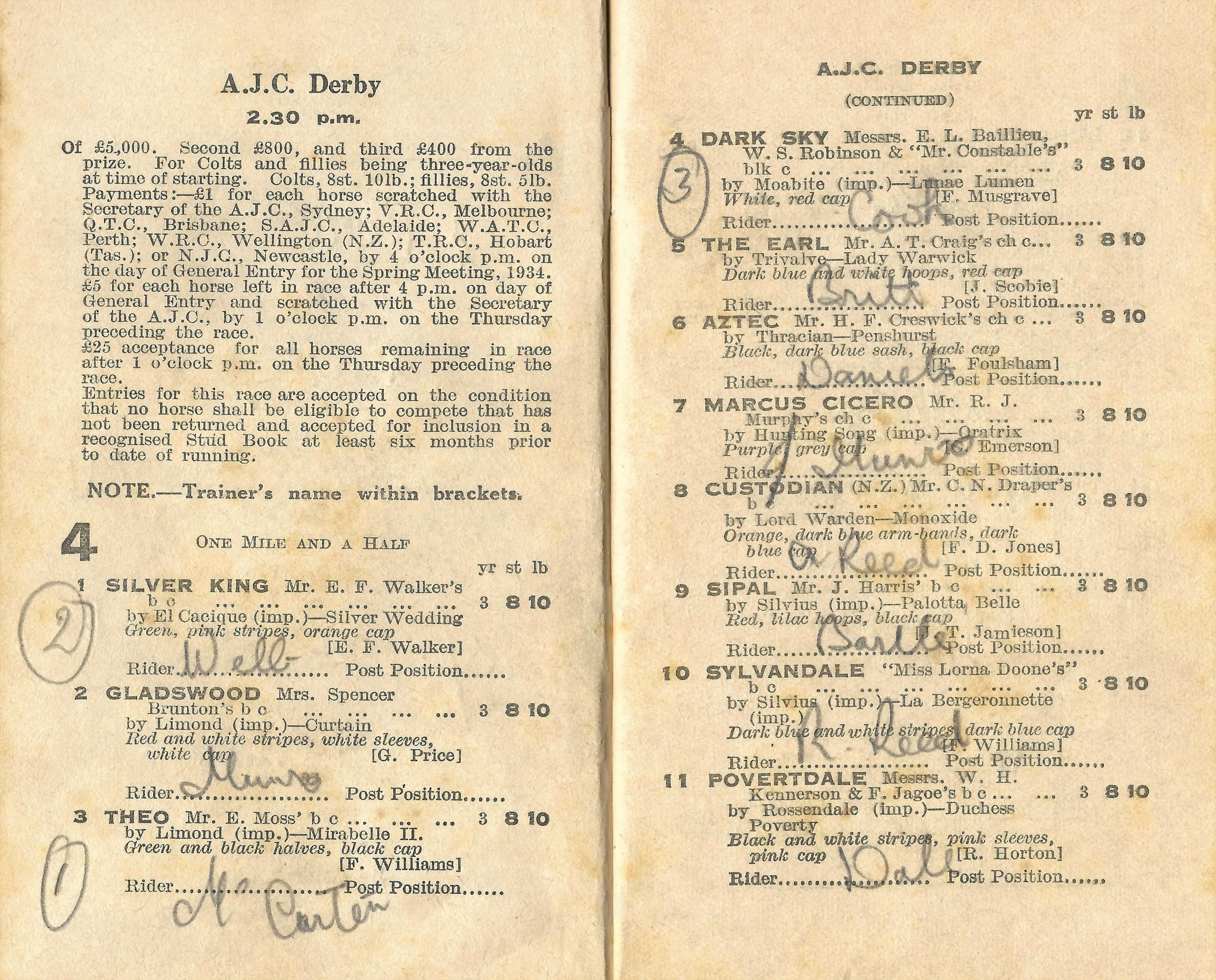
1934 AJC Derby showing the winner, Theo

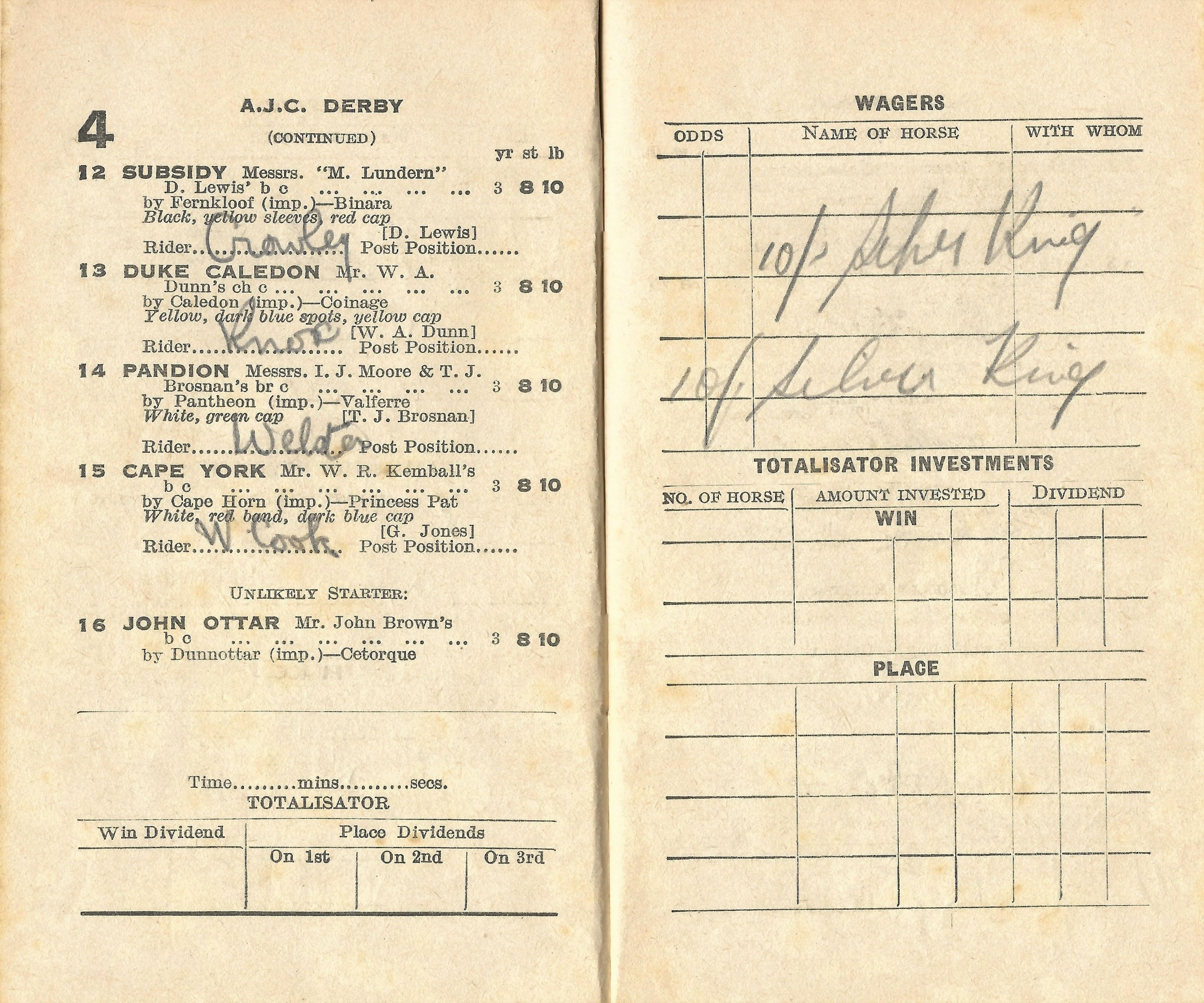
1934 AJC Derby starters and results

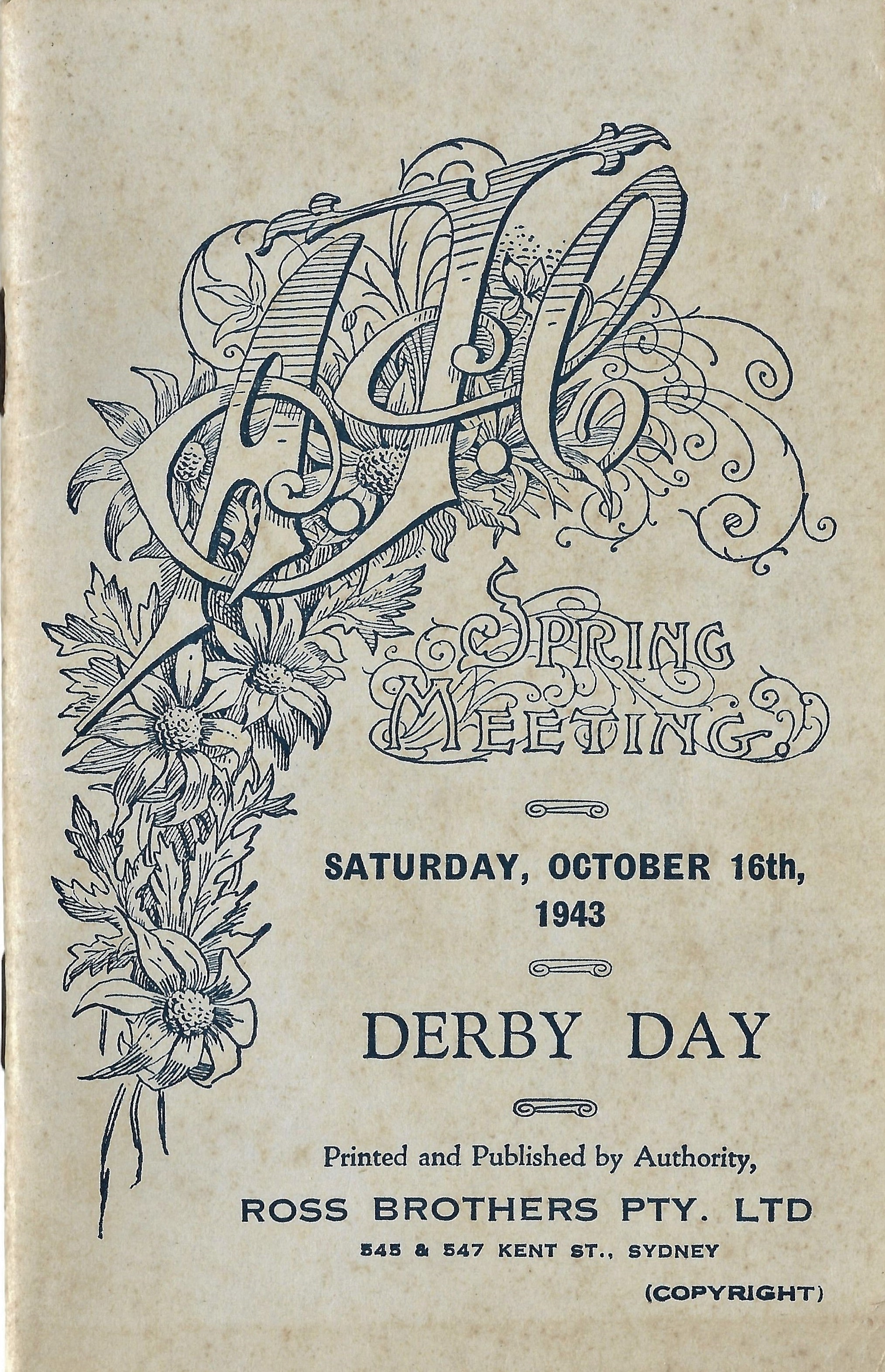
1943 AJC Derby racebook front cover

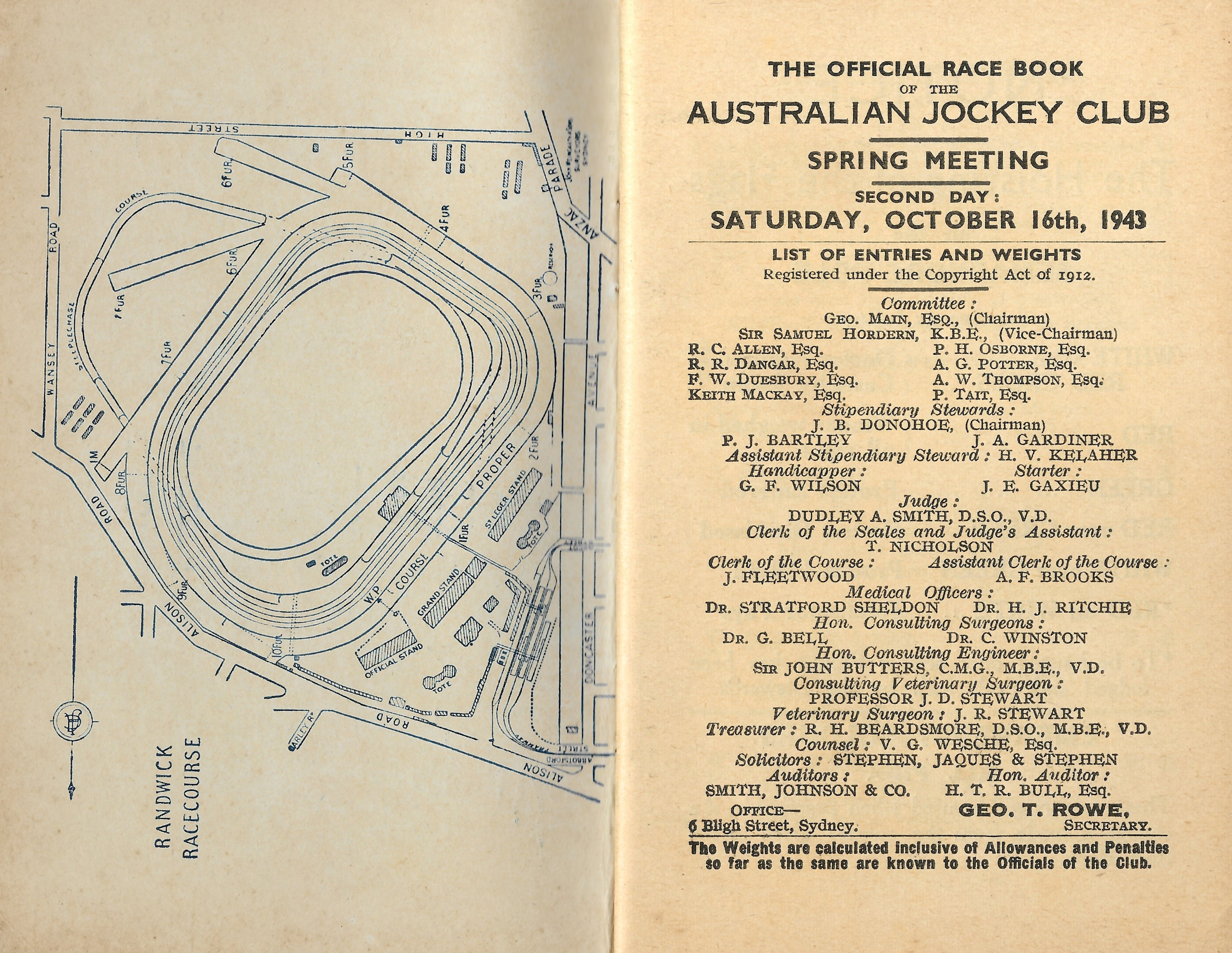
1943 AJC Derby showing raceday officials

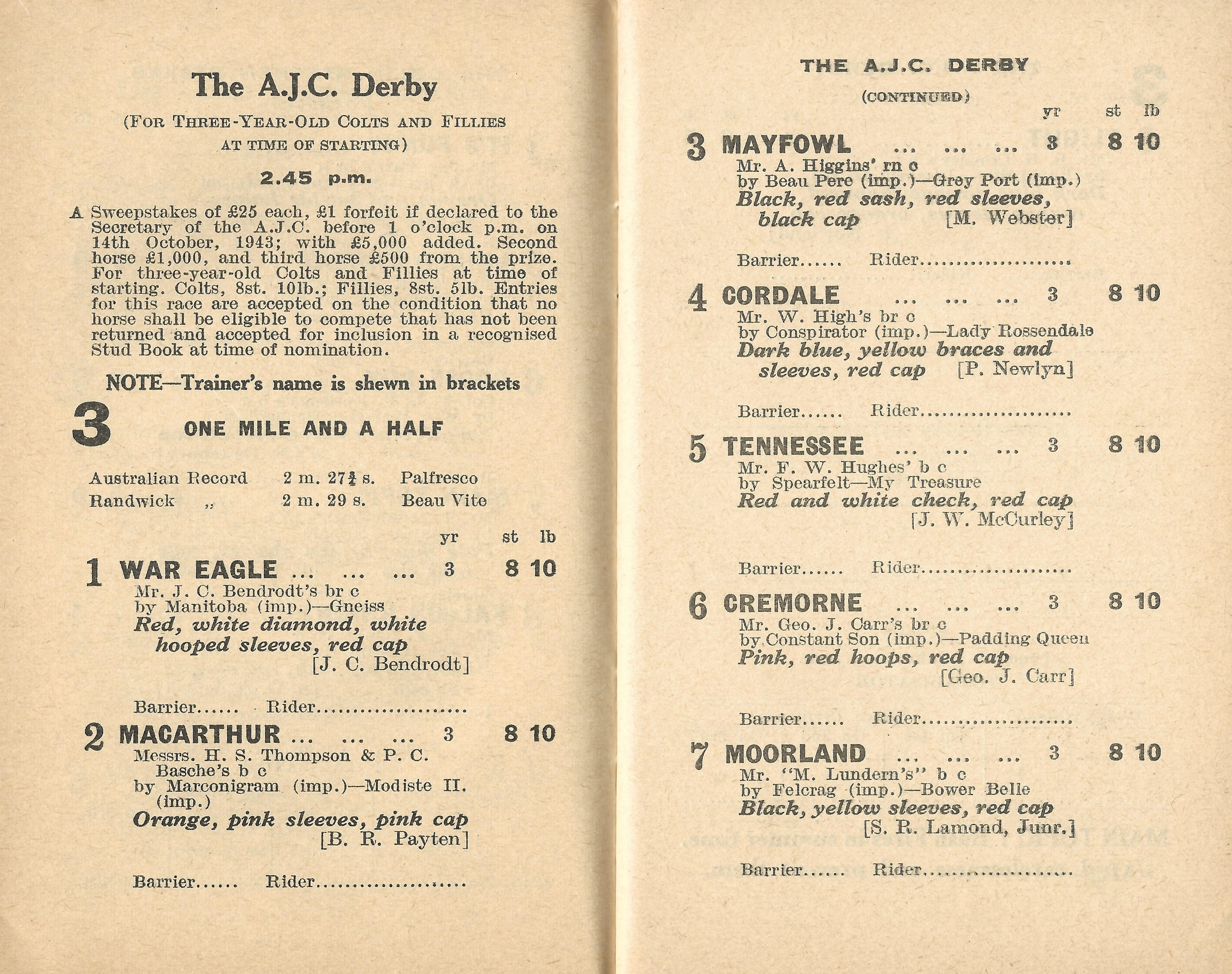
1943 AJC Derby showing the winner, Moorland

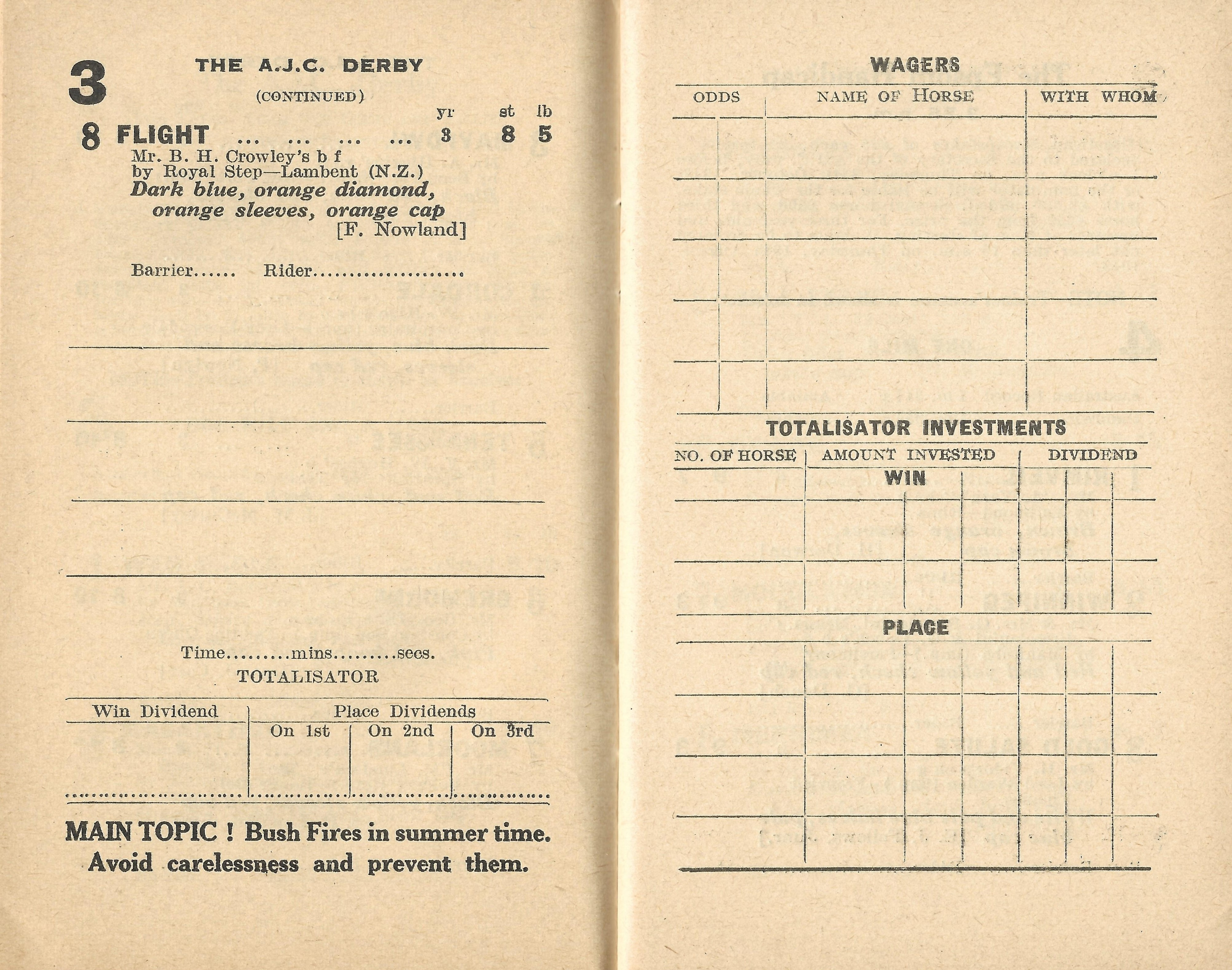
1943 AJC Derby starters and results

=== 1945 and 1948 racebooks ===
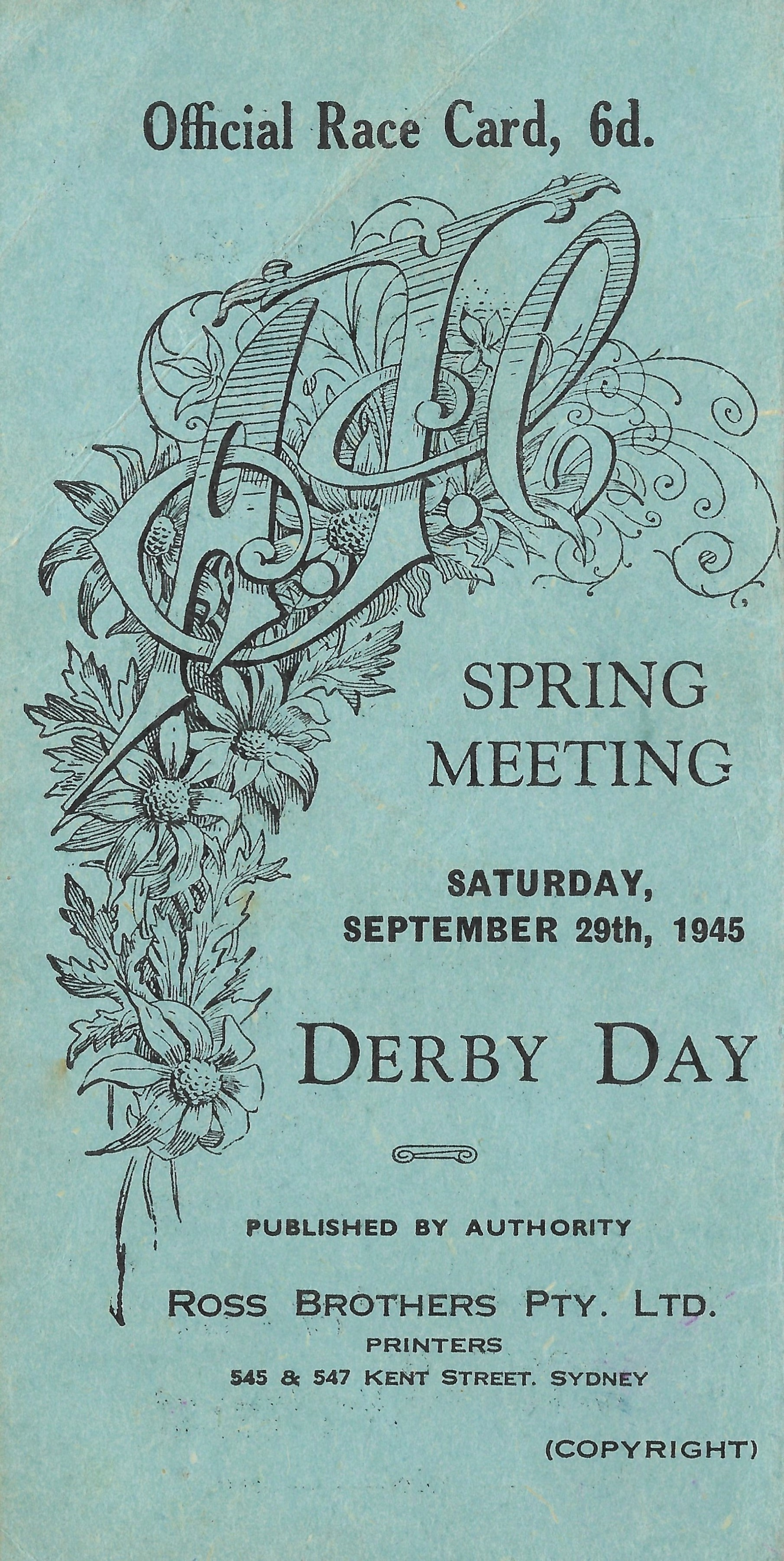
1945 AJC Derby racebook front cover

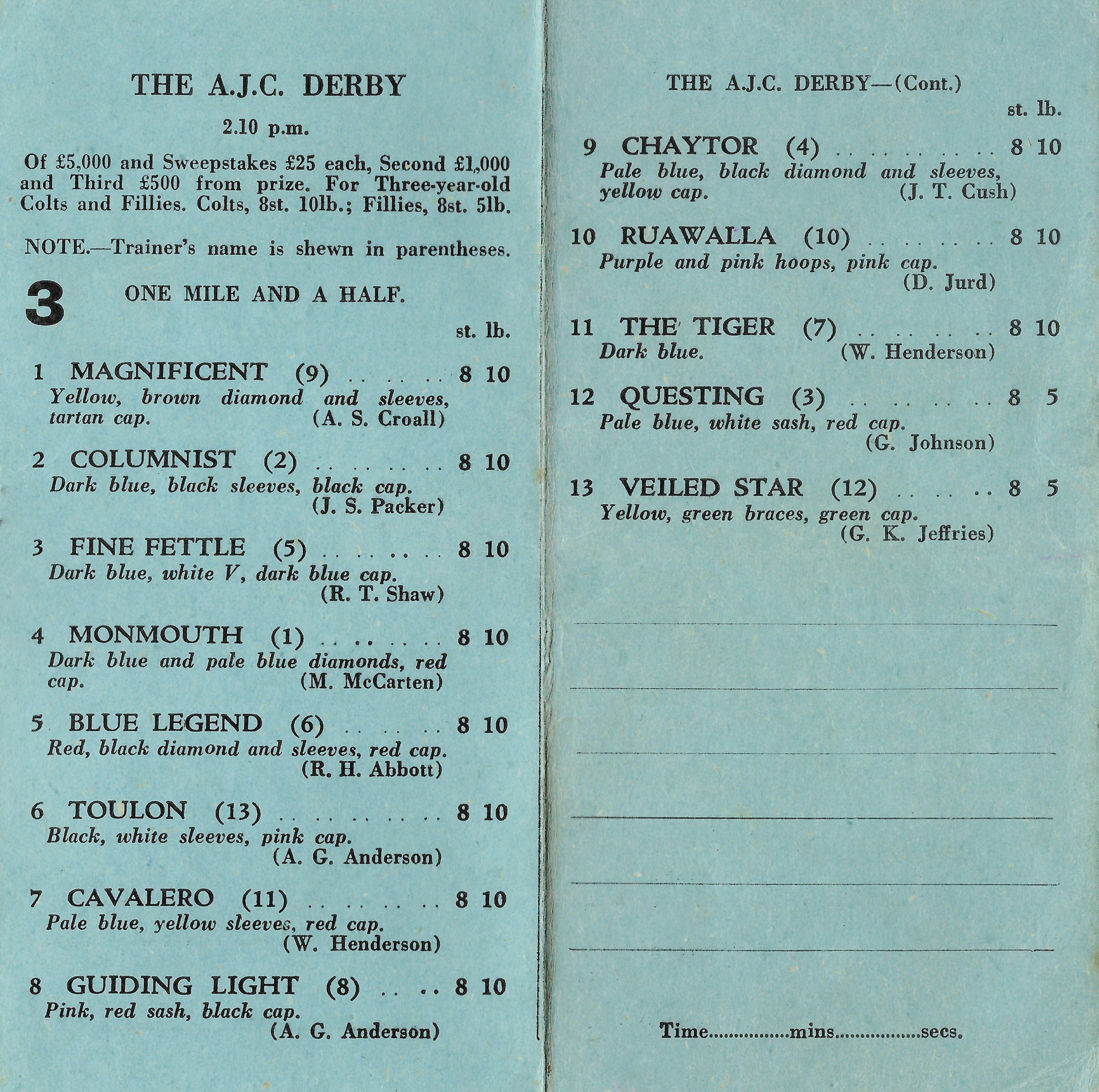
1945 AJC Derby showing the winner, Magnificent

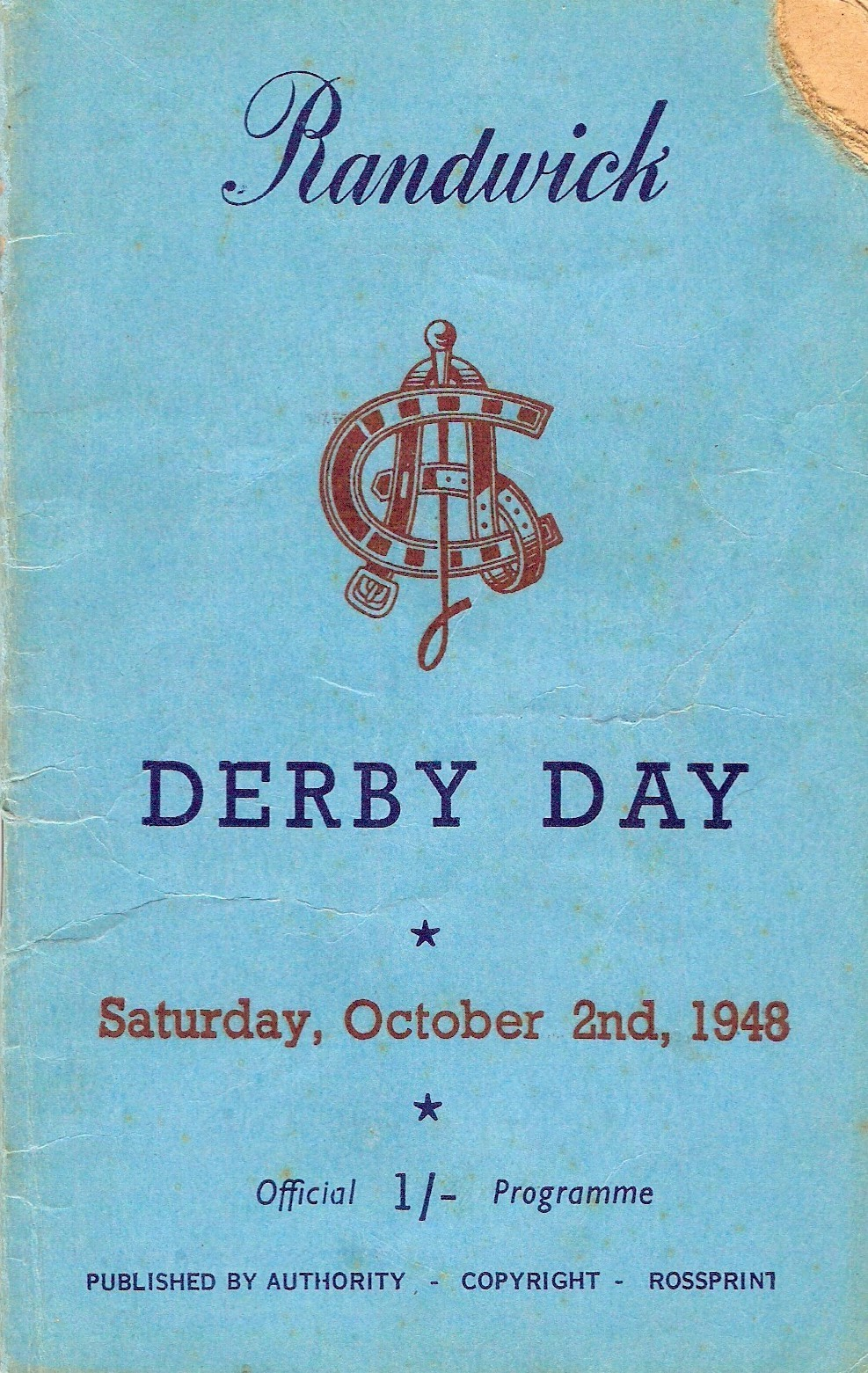
1948 AJC Derby racebook front cover

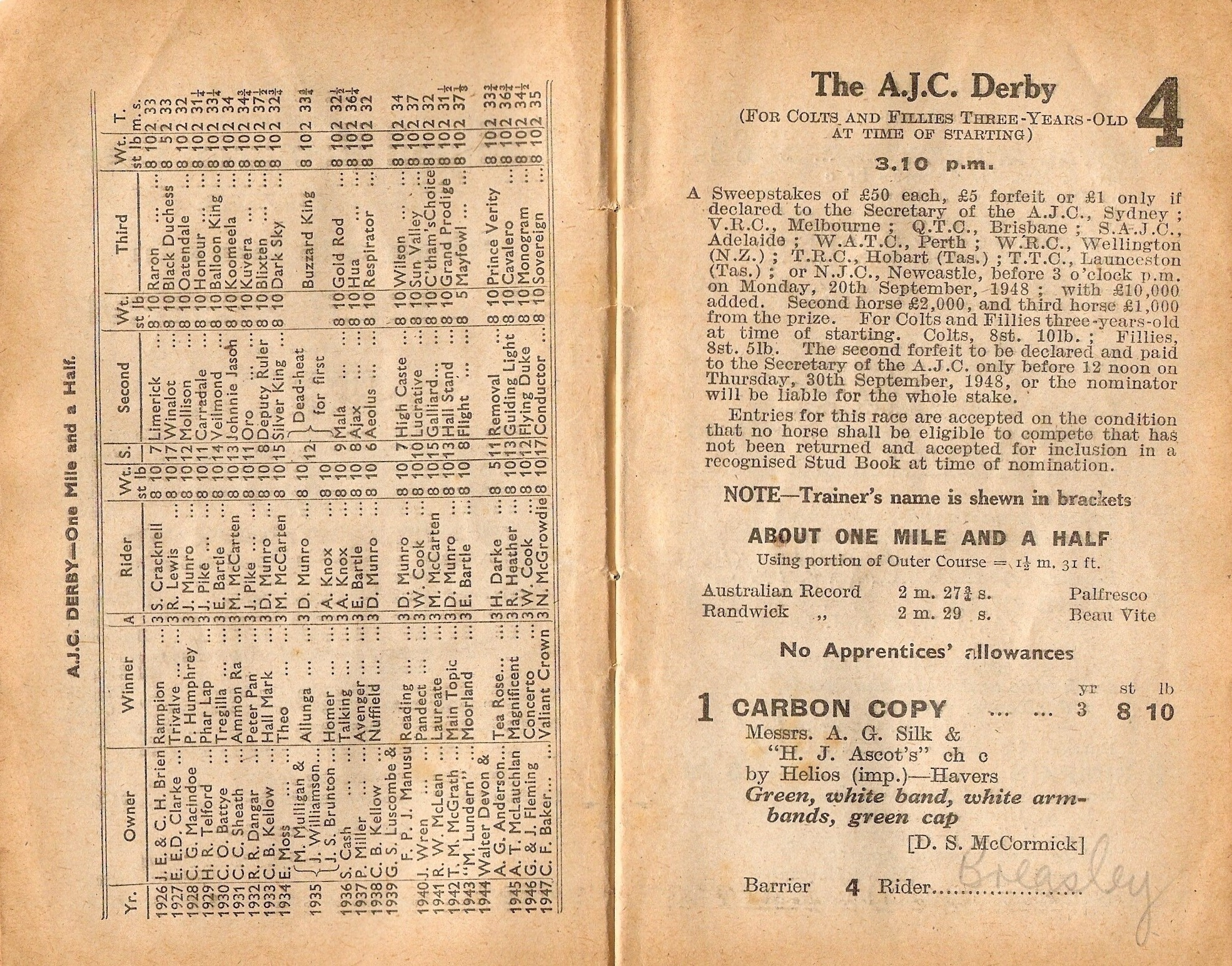
1948 AJC Derby showing the winner, Carbon Copy

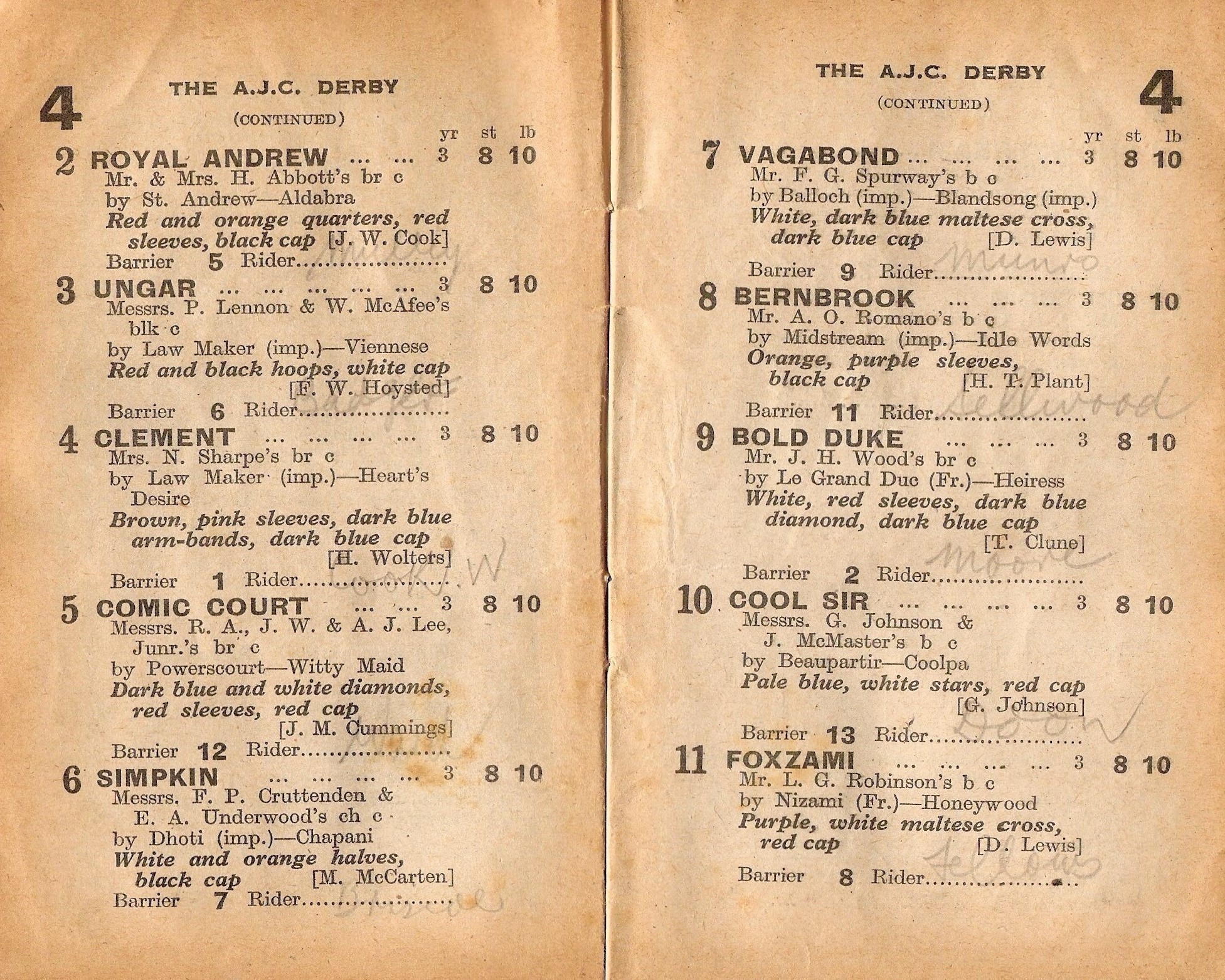
1948 AJC Derby starters and results

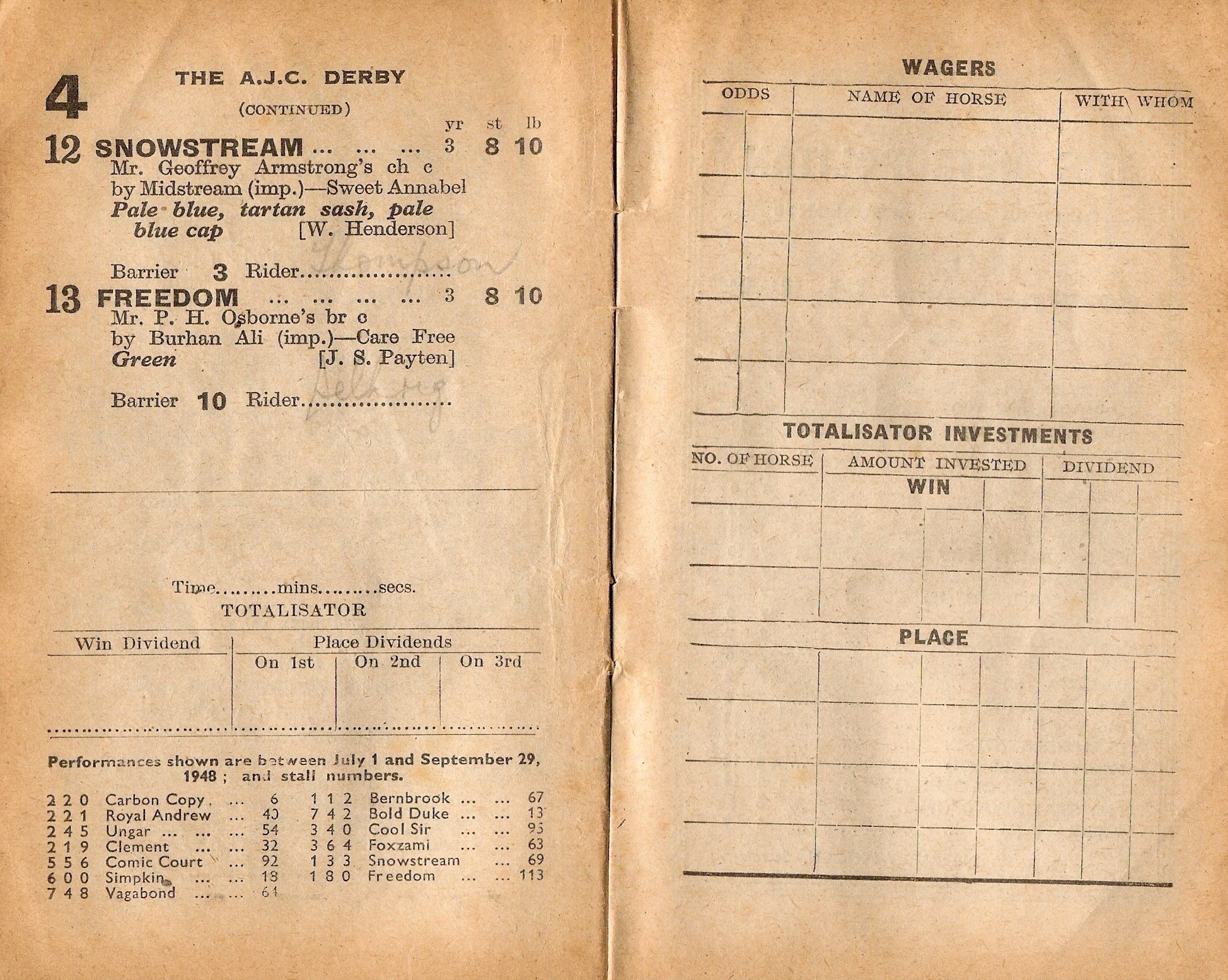
1948 AJC Derby starters and results

=== 1955 racebook ===
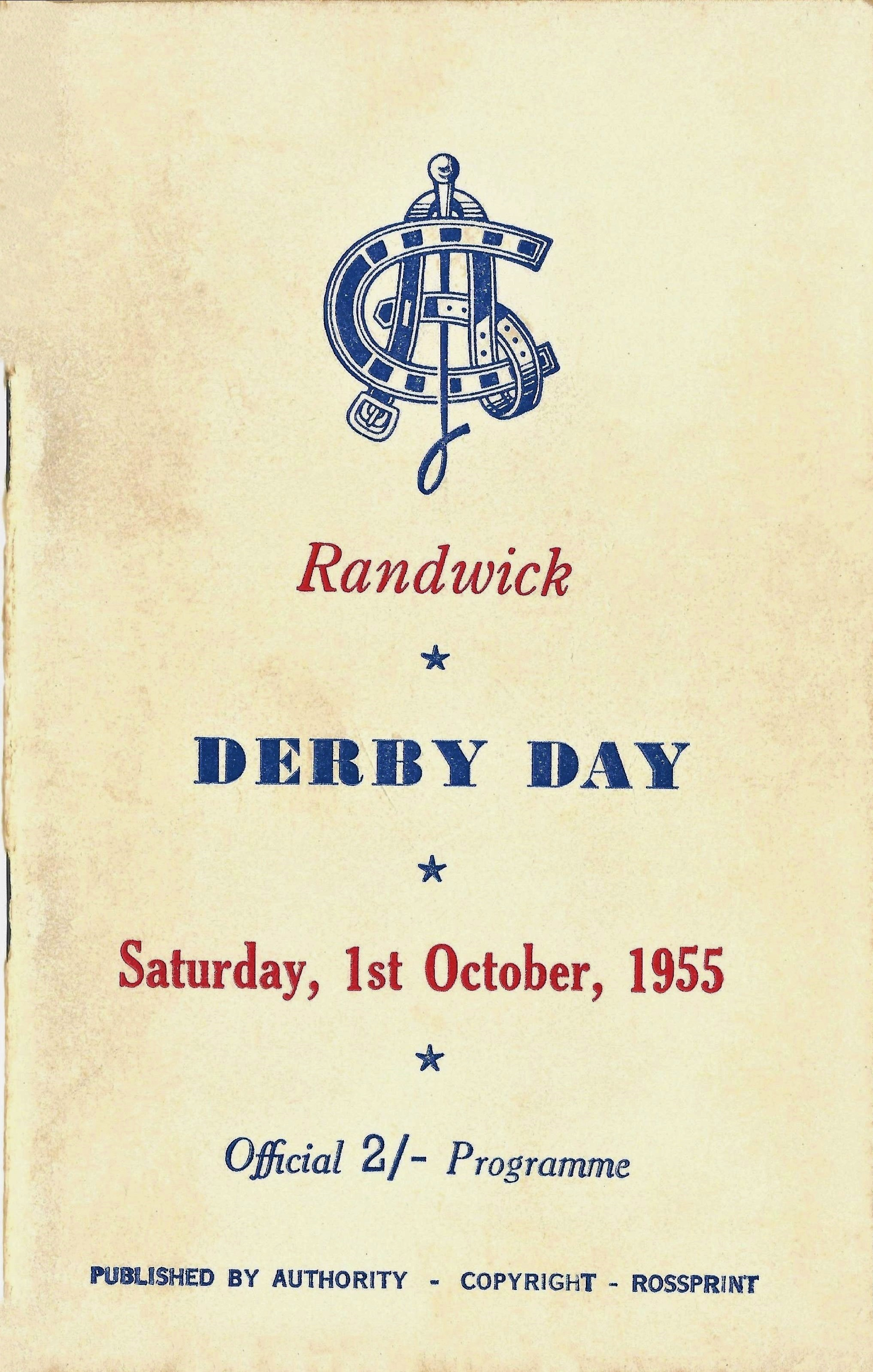
1955 AJC Derby racebook front cover

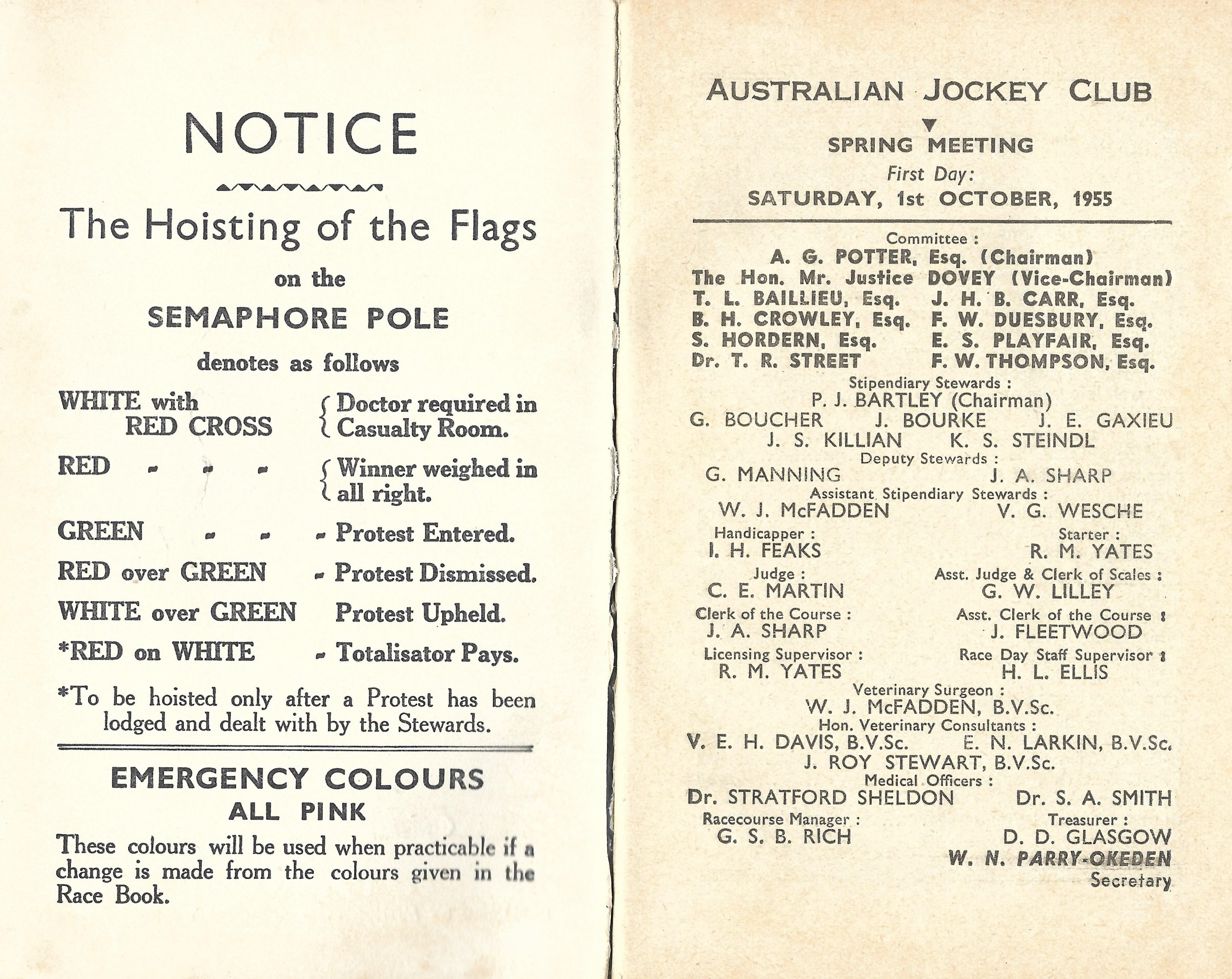
1955 AJC Derby showing raceday officials

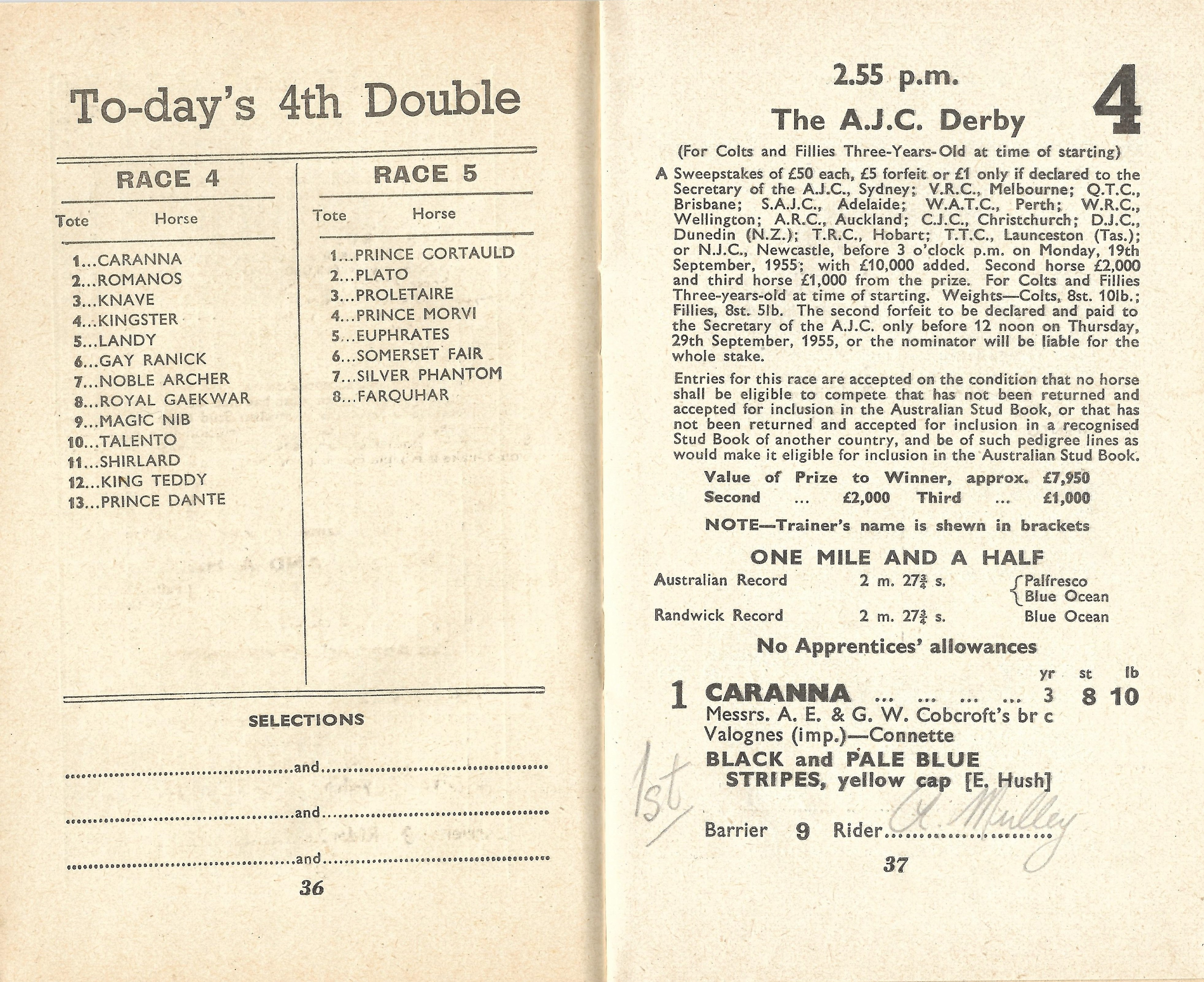
1955 AJC Derby showing the winner, Caranna

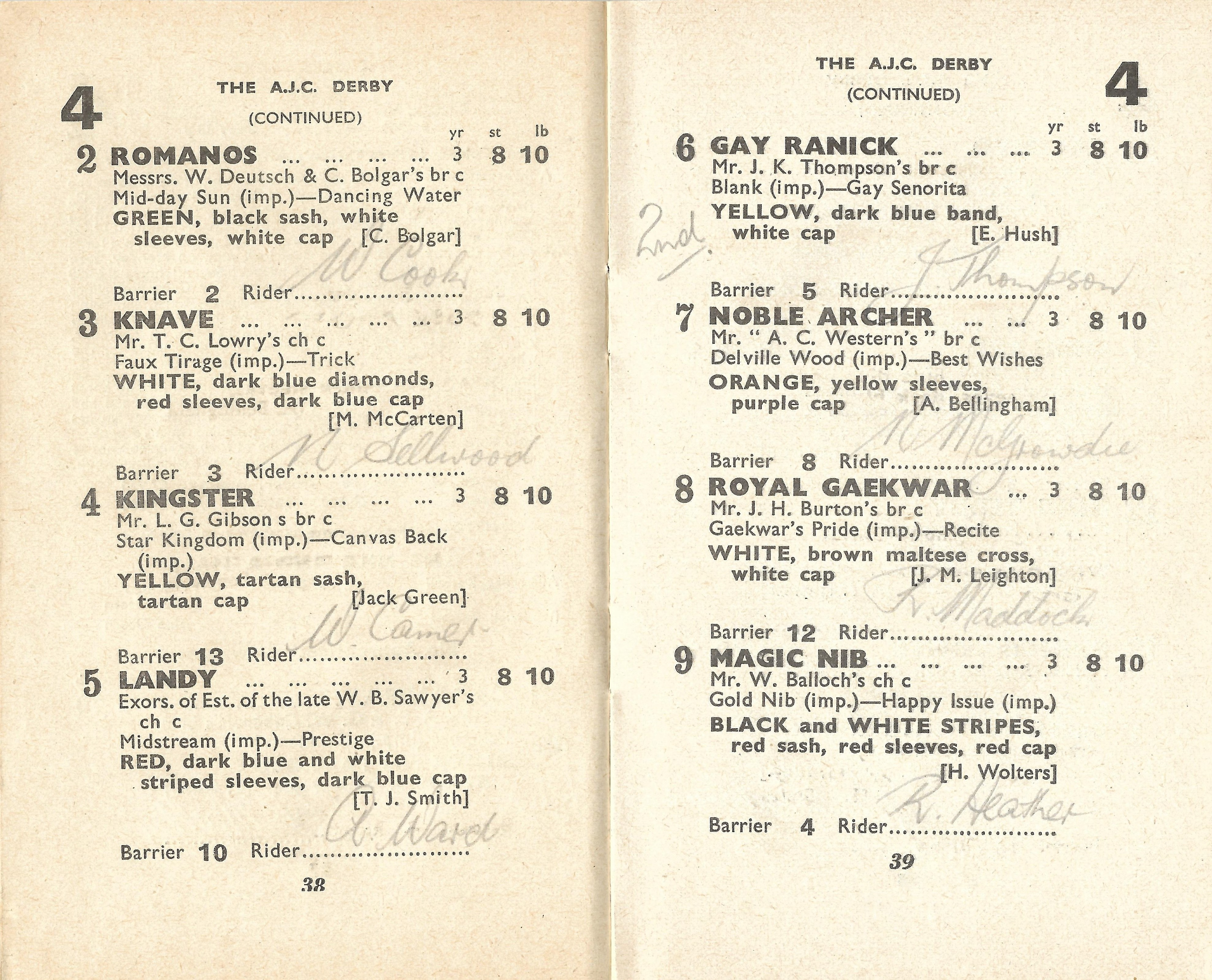
1955 AJC Derby starters and results

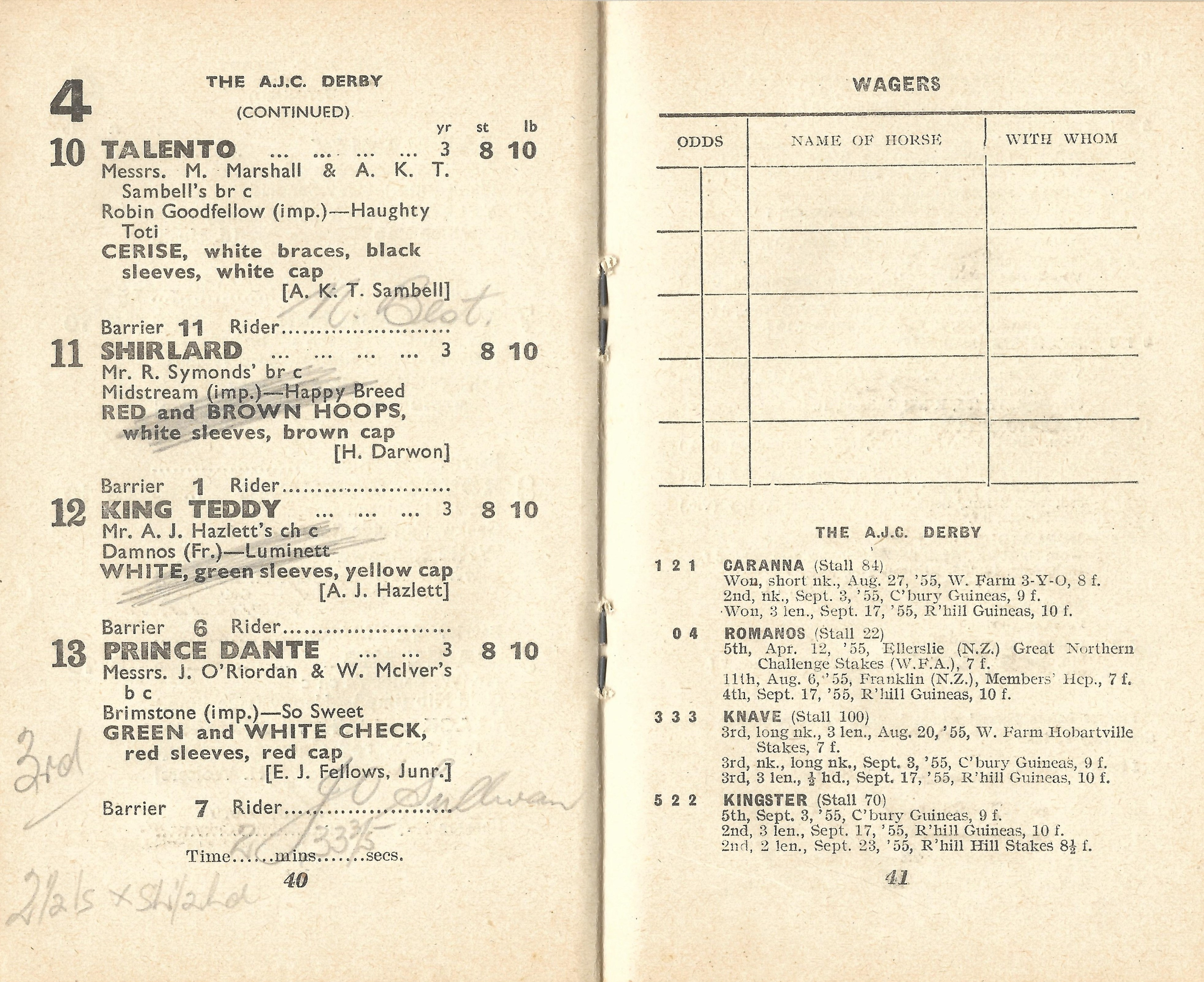
1955 AJC Derby starters and results

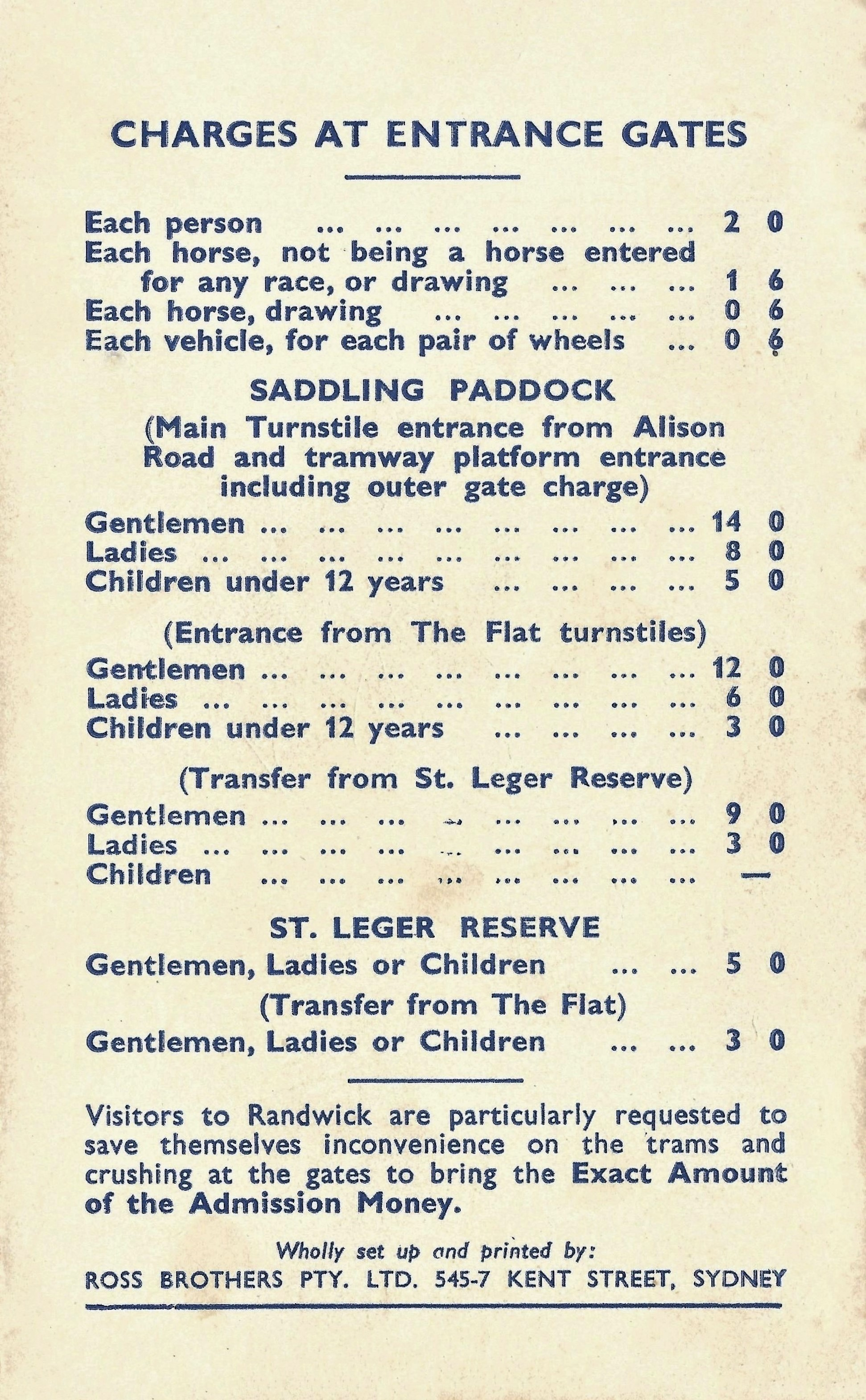
1955 AJC Derby back cover charges at the entrance gates

=== Gallery of noted winners ===
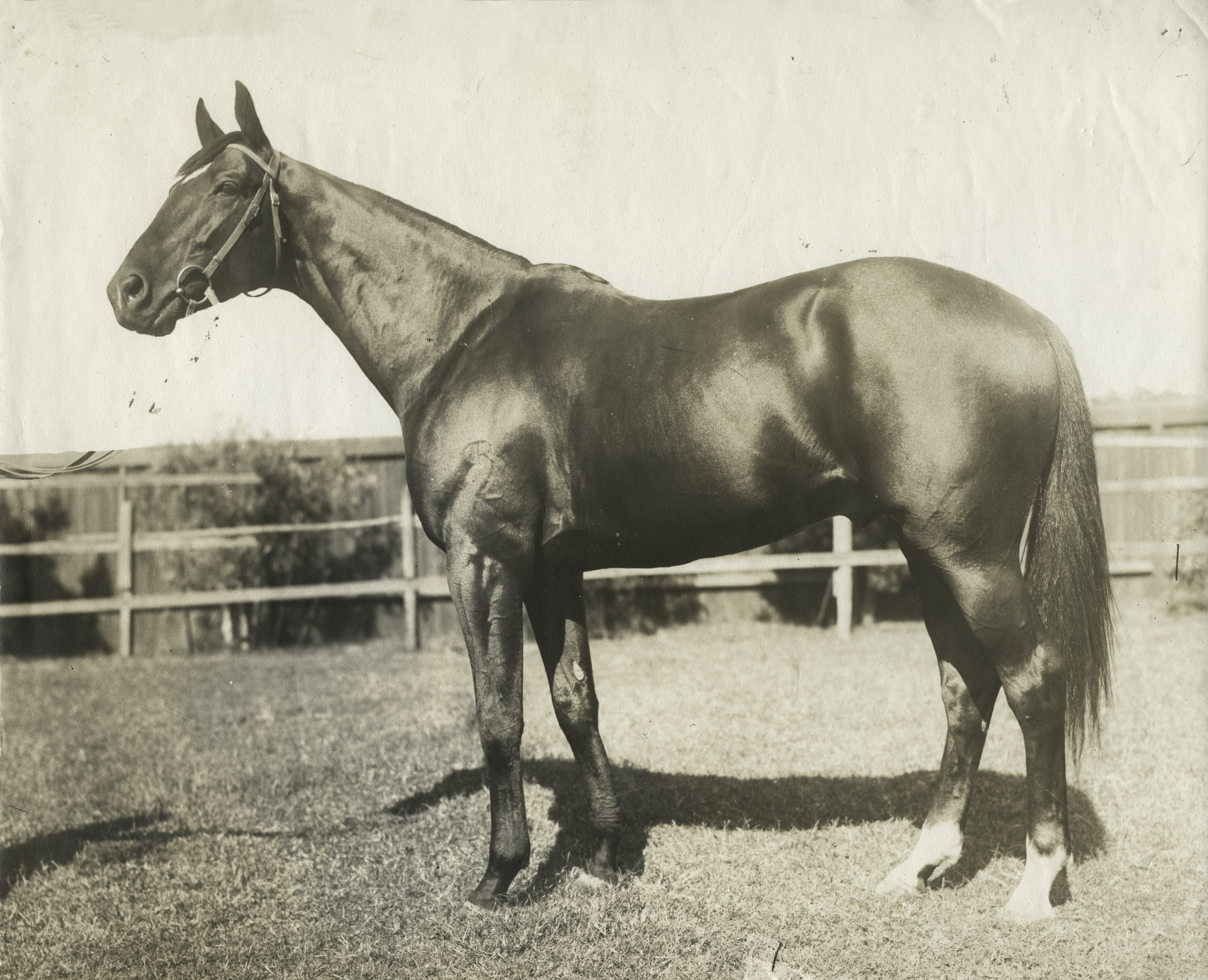
Poseidon, 1906 winner

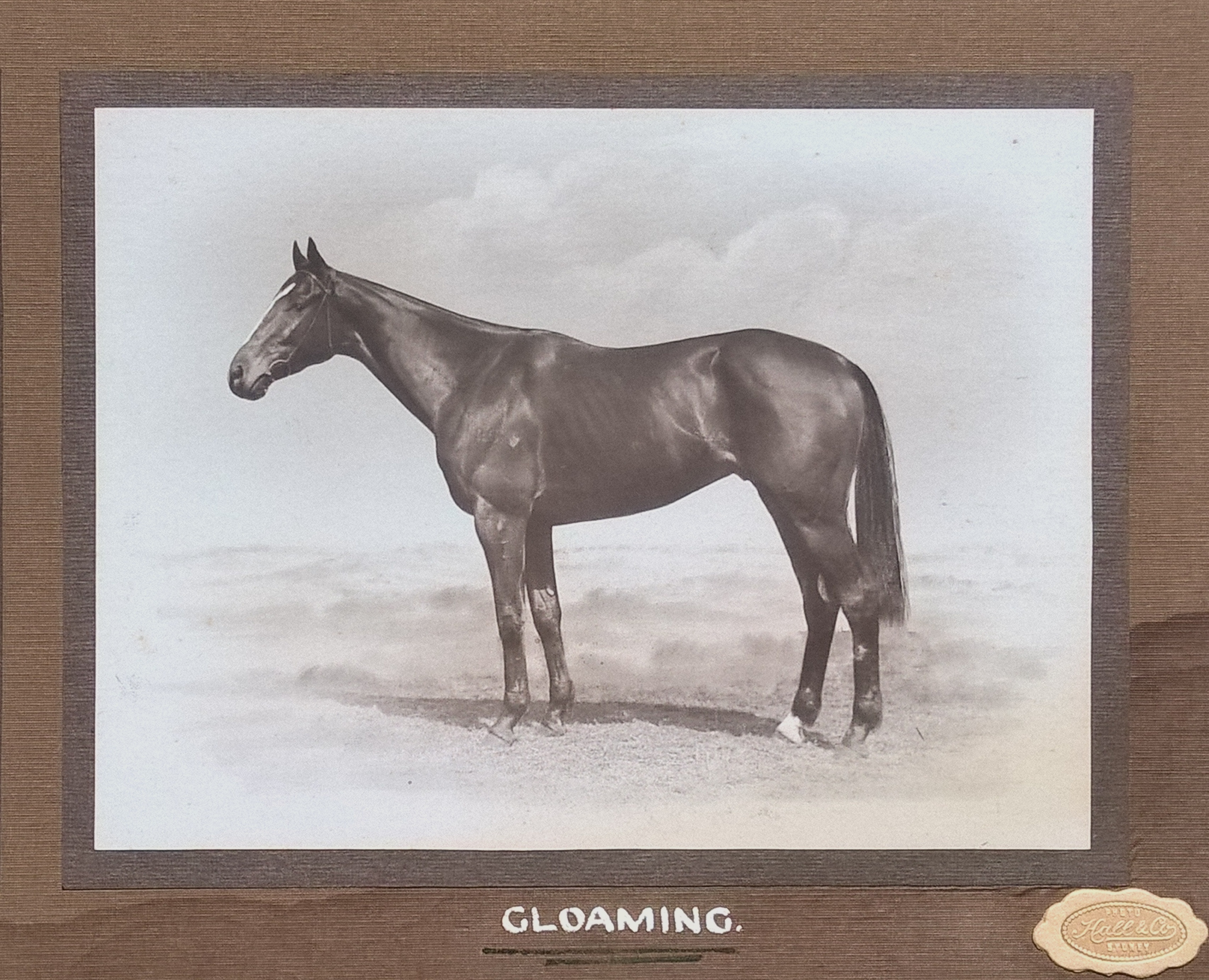
Gloaming, 1918 winner

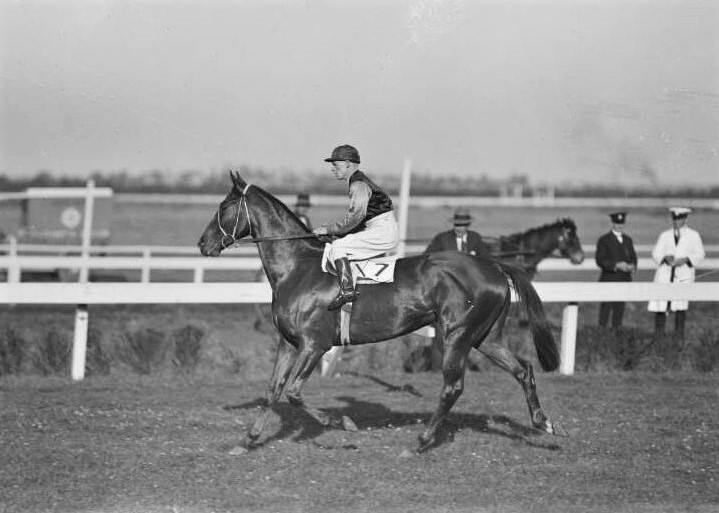
Manfred, 1925 winner

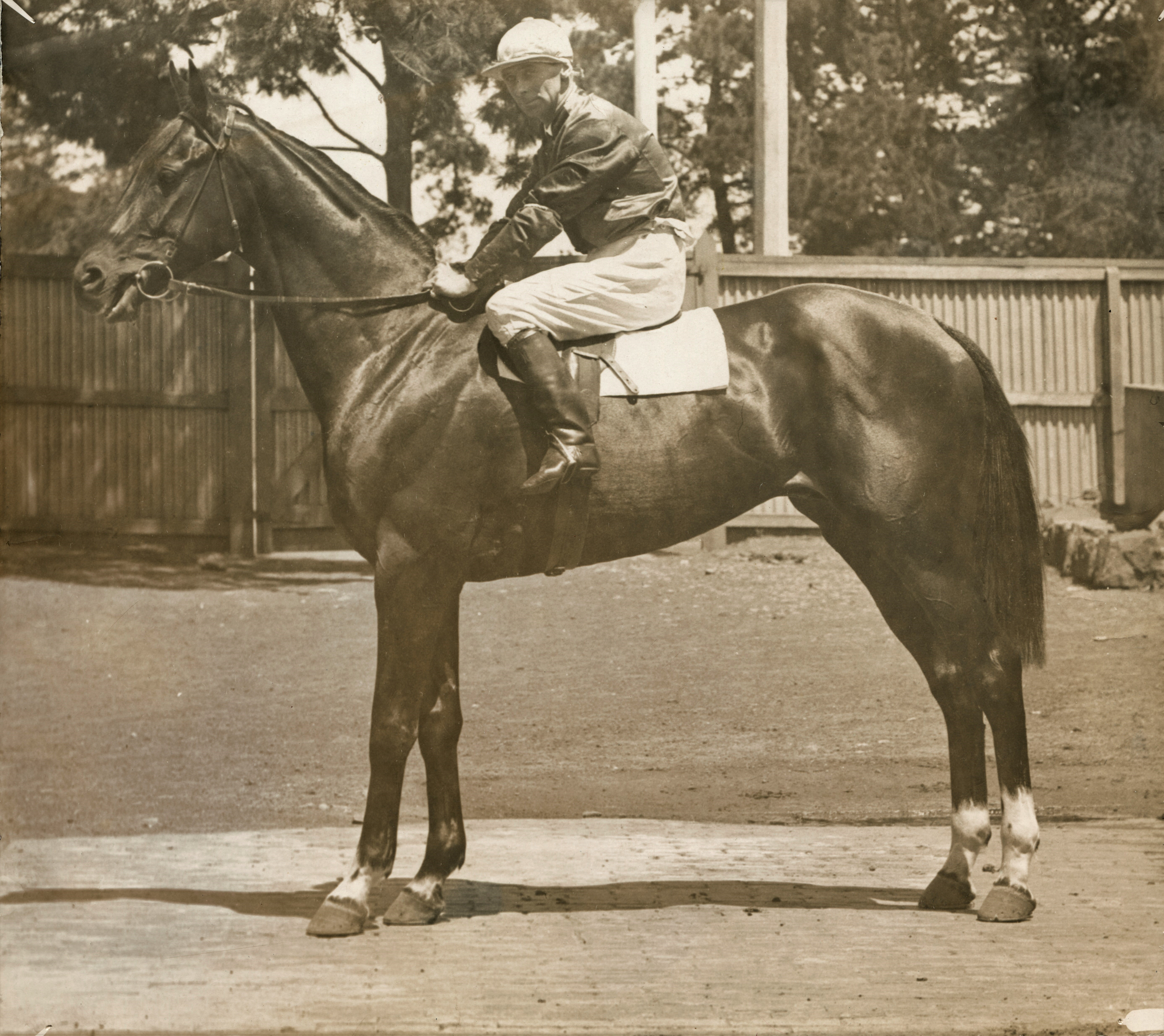
Biplane, 1917 winner

== Winners ==
The following are winners of the race.

- 2026 - Green Spaces
- 2025 - Aeliana
- 2024 - Riff Rocket
- 2023 - Major Beel
- 2022 - Hitotsu
- 2021 - Explosive Jack
- 2020 - Quick Thinker
- 2019 - Angel Of Truth
- 2018 - Levendi
- 2017 - Jon Snow
- 2016 - Tavago
- 2015^{(1)} - Mongolian Khan
- 2014 - Criterion
- 2013 - It's A Dundeel
- 2012 - Ethiopia
- 2011 - Shamrocker
- 2010 - Shoot Out
- 2009 - Roman Emperor
- 2008 - Nom Du Jeu
- 2007 - Fiumicino
- 2006 - Headturner
- 2005 - Eremein
- 2004 - Starcraft
- 2003 - Clangalang
- 2002 - Don Eduardo
- 2001 - Universal Prince
- 2000 - Fairway
- 1999 - Sky Heights
- 1998 - Gold Guru
- 1997 - Ebony Grosve
- 1996 - Octagonal
- 1995 - Ivory's Irish
- 1994 - Mahogany
- 1993 - Innocent King
- 1992 - Naturalism
- 1991 - Durbridge
- 1990 - Dr. Grace
- 1989 - Research
- 1988 - Beau Zam
- 1987 - Myocard
- 1986 - Bonecrusher
- 1985 - Tristarc
- 1984 - Prolific
- 1983 - Strawberry Road
- 1982 - Rose Of Kingston
- 1981 - Our Paddy Boy
- 1980 - Kingston Town
- 1979 - Dulcify
- 1978 - Race not held^{(2)}
- 1977 - Belmura Lad
- 1976 - Great Lover
- 1975 - Battle Sign
- 1974 - Taras Bulba
- 1973 - Imagele
- 1972 - Gold Brick
- 1971 - Classic Mission
- 1970 - Silver Sharpe
- 1969 - Divide And Rule
- 1968 - Wilton Park
- 1967 - Swift Peter
- 1966 - El Gordo
- 1965 - Prince Grant
- 1964 - Royal Sovereign
- 1963 - Summer Fiesta
- 1962 - Summer Prince
- 1961 - Summer Fair
- 1960 - Persian Lyric
- 1959 - Martello Towers
- 1958 - Skyline
- 1957 - Tulloch
- 1956 - Monte Carlo
- 1955 - Caranna
- 1954 - Prince Delville
- 1953 - Prince Morvi
- 1952 - Deep River
- 1951 - Channel Rise
- 1950 - Alister
- 1949 - Playboy
- 1948 - Carbon Copy
- 1947 - Valiant Crown
- 1946 - Concerto
- 1945 - Magnificent
- 1944 - Tea Rose
- 1943 - Moorland
- 1942 - Main Topic
- 1941 - Laureate
- 1940 - Pandect
- 1939 - Reading
- 1938 - Nuffield
- 1937 - Avenger
- 1936 - Talking
- 1935 - Allunga / Homer^{(3)}
- 1934 - Theo
- 1933 - Hall Mark
- 1932 - Peter Pan
- 1931 - Ammon Ra
- 1930 - Tregilla
- 1929 - Phar Lap
- 1928 - Prince Humphrey
- 1927 - Trivalve
- 1926 - Rampion
- 1925 - Manfred
- 1924 - Heroic
- 1923 - Ballymena
- 1922 - Rivoli
- 1921 - Cupidon
- 1920 - Salitros
- 1919 - Artilleryman / Richmond Main^{(3)}
- 1918 - Gloaming
- 1917 - Biplane
- 1916 - Kilboy
- 1915 - Cetigne
- 1914 - Mountain Knight
- 1913 - Beragoon
- 1912 - Cider
- 1911 - Cisco
- 1910 - Tanami
- 1909 - Prince Foote
- 1908 - Parsee
- 1907 - Mountain King
- 1906 - Poseidon
- 1905 - Noctuiform
- 1904 - Sylvanite
- 1903 - Belah
- 1902 - Abundance
- 1901 - Hautvilliers
- 1900 - Malster
- 1899 - Cranberry
- 1898 - Picture
- 1897 - Amberite
- 1896 - Charge
- 1895 - Bob Ray
- 1894 - Bonnie Scotland
- 1893 - Trenchant
- 1892 - Camoola
- 1891 - Stromboli
- 1890 - Gibraltar
- 1889 - Singapore
- 1888 - Melos
- 1887 - Abercorn
- 1886 - Trident
- 1885 - Nordenfeldt
- 1884 - Bargo
- 1883 - Le Grand
- 1882 - Navigator
- 1881 - Wheatear
- 1880 - Grand Flaneur
- 1879 - Nellie
- 1878 - His Lordship
- 1877 - Woodlands
- 1876 - Robinson Crusoe
- 1875 - Richmond
- 1874 - Kingsborough
- 1873 - Benvolio
- 1872 - Loup Garou
- 1871 - Javelin
- 1870 - Florence
- 1869 - Charon
- 1868 - The Duke
- 1867 - Fireworks
- 1866 - The Barb
- 1865 - Clove
- 1864 - Yattendon
- 1863 - Ramornie
- 1862 - Regno
- 1861 - Kyogle

Notes:

- ^(1) Date of race rescheduled due to postponement of the Easter Saturday meeting because of the heavy track conditions. The meeting was moved to Easter Monday, 6 April 2015.
- ^(2) Change in scheduling of race from spring to autumn
- ^(3) Dead heat

== See also ==
- Adrian Knox Stakes
- Carbine Club Stakes (ATC)
- Chairman's Quality
- Doncaster Mile
- Inglis Sires
- Kindergarten Stakes
- P J Bell Stakes
- T J Smith Stakes
- Australian Triple Crown of Thoroughbred Racing
- List of Australian Group races
- Group races

The premier race for three-year-old Thoroughbreds in other countries:

- New Zealand Derby
- Derby Italiano (Italy)
- Deutsches Derby (Germany)
- Epsom Derby (United Kingdom)
- Kentucky Derby (United States)
- Prix du Jockey Club (France)
- Romanian Derby (Romania)
- Tōkyō Yūshun (Japan)
- Queen's Plate (Canada)
