= 1966 Melbourne Cup =

Edition of the Melbourne Cup

- Melbourne Cup
- Location: Flemington Racecourse
- Date: 1 Nov 1966
- Distance: 2 miles
- Winning horse: Galilee
- Winning time: 3:21.9
- Final odds: 11/2
- Jockey: John Miller
- Trainer: Bart Cummings
- Owner: Max & Venice Miller
- Conditions: Slow
- Surface: Turf

Where Duo momentarily had gone to the lead, tackled now by Light Fingers then Aveniam, forcing up John the rail and on the outside the South Australian stayer Galilee rapidly setting sail after them, look at Galilee go! Galilee has gone to the front, half way down the straight, holding Light Fingers, Duo and Aveniam at bay and it's all Galilee! Galilee a big winner over Light Fingers, third home Duo.

— Commentator Joe Brown describes the climax of the race

The 1966 Melbourne Cup was a 2-mile (3,218.7 m) handicap horse race which took place on Tuesday, 1 November 1966, at Flemington Racecourse.

The race was won by Galilee, a gelding trained by Bart Cummings and ridden by John Miller. The runner up was Light Fingers also trained by Cummings, who had trained the 1965 Melbourne Cup winner. Third place went to Duo. The winning margin was two lengths and there was a half-head to third place.

This race was the second of a record twelve Melbourne Cup winners for Cummings, and also the second of the five times he trained the quinella.

Galilee (Alcimedes-Galston, by Balloch) was bred by Trelawney Stud in Cambridge, New Zealand. He had previously won the Caulfield Cup and went on to win the 1967 Sydney Cup. He was ridden by Miller in all three Cups. Galilee and Miller are the only horse and jockey to have won all three.

== Field ==
This is a list of horses which ran in the 1966 Melbourne Cup.

Place	Horse	Trainer	Jockey
1st	Galilee	Bart Cummings	John Miller
2nd	Light Fingers	Bart Cummings	Roy Higgins
3rd	Duo	R A Dickerson	George Podmore
4th	Aveniam	J Morgan	B McClune
5th	Gala Crest	R J Hutchins	P Gumbleton
6th	Tea Biscuit	P J Murray	H Cope
7th	Gatum Gatum	H G Heagney	Frank Reys
8th	Royal Coral	R H Claarton	P Jarman
9th	Alaska	V P Bernard	Pat Hyland
10th	Terrific	M E Ritchie	G Hughes
11th	Bore Head	D Judd	B Gilders
12th	Prince Grant	T J Smith	George Moore
13th	Dignify	V Maloney	W Smith
14th	Trevors	Mrs A Shepherd	A Mulley
15th	Clipjoint	M E Richie	J Stocker
16th	Coppelius	B Courtney	M Moore
17th	Beau Royal	N D Hoysted	R Durey
18th	Tobin Bronze	H G Heagney	Jim Johnson
19th	El Gordo	L J O'Sullivan	N Campton
20th	Red Brass	H G Heagney	R Selkrig
21st	Mystic Glen	F G Hood	K Langby
22nd	Winfreux	C A Wilson	A Lister
