= 1967 Melbourne Cup =

Edition of the Melbourne Cup

- Melbourne Cup
- Location: Flemington Racecourse
- Date: 7 Nov 1967
- Distance: 2 miles
- Winning horse: Red Handed
- Winning time: 3:20.4
- Final odds: 4/1
- Jockey: Roy Higgins
- Trainer: Bart Cummings
- Owner: F W (Bill) Clarke, Brian M Condon & Angus G Tyson (Adelaide)
- Conditions: Fast
- Surface: Turf

At the furlong and a half, Red Handed's taken the lead from Bellition, on the outside Red Crest, coming through on the inside now is Padtheway. It's Red Crest just got his head in front at the furlong from Red Handed fighting back, on the fence is Padtheway and now Floodbird having to change course is finishing fast. Red Handed a narrow leader from Red Crest, Padtheway, Floodbird pegging them back but Red Handed's too good! He's won the Cup a neck to Red Crest.

— Commentator Bill Collins describes the climax of the race

The 1967 Melbourne Cup was a two-mile handicap horse race which took place on Tuesday, 7 November 1967. The race, run over 2 miles (3,218.7 m), at Flemington Racecourse.

The race was won by the New Zealand bred stallion Red Handed, trained by Bart Cummings and ridden by Roy Higgins. The runner up was Red Crest and third place went to Floodbird. The winning margin was only a neck and a further neck to third place.

This was the third win in a row in the great race by Bart Cummings who went on to record twelve Melbourne Cup winners.

Purchased from Pirongia Stud in New Zealand, Red Handed was sired by the French stallion, Le Filou, and his dam Red Might (NZ) was by Red Mars (GB). His off foreleg was club-footed and the nerves on one side of his head were paralysed due to being kicked by another horse.

It was the second victory for Roy Higgins who had brought home Light Fingers for Bart in the 1965 Melbourne Cup.

== Field ==
The following are the placegetters in the 1967 Melbourne Cup.

Place	Horse	Trainer	Jockey
1st	Red Handed (NZ)	Bart Cummings	Roy Higgins
2nd	Red Crest (NZ)	J W Winder	Ron Taylor
3rd	Floodbird	L M Armfield	J Stocker
4th	Padtheway	J Smith	Frank Reys
5th	Prince Camillo	R Fisher	P Gumbleton
6th	General Command	W Wilson	G Lane
7th	Billiton (NZ)	George Hanlon	Harry White
8th	Sunhaven	L Burgess	B Courtney
9th	Fulmen	Bart Cummings	M Goreham
10th	Royal Coral	R H Claarton	D Miller
11th	Taunton	E J Jenkins	P Alderman
12th	Ziema	Bart Cummings	John Miller
13th	Coronation Cadet	N Forbes	J Wade
14th	Swift Peter	A Beauneville	W Camer
15th	Midlander	N D Hoysted	Pat Hyland
16th	Jay Ay (NZ)	D S McCormick	P Jarman
17th	Basin Street	J J Moloney	B Gilders
18th	Stella Belle (NZ)	I Tucker	Bob Skelton
19th	Special Reward	A E Elkington	W A Smith
20th	Garcon	Tommy J. Smith	D Lake
21st	Blue Special	R Wallis	R Durey
22nd	Tupaki	H N Wiggins	K Langby
