= Australian Racing Hall of Fame =

Part of the Australian Racing Museum

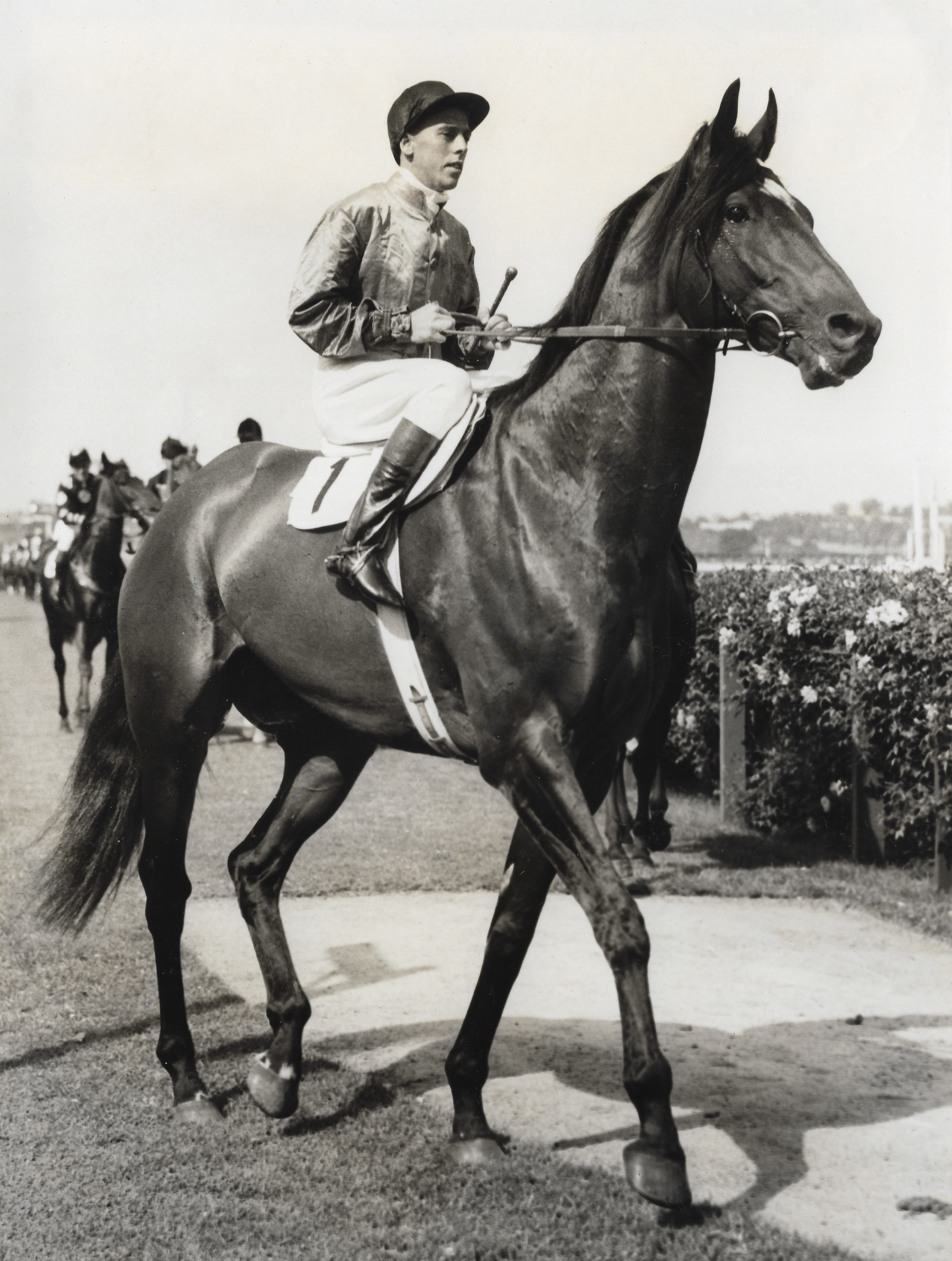
Bernborough an inaugural inductee into the Racing Hall of Fame.

The Australian Racing Hall of Fame is part of the Australian Racing Museum which documents and honours the horseracing legends of Australia. The museum officially opened in 1981 and created the Hall of Fame in 2000.

The numbers in brackets after each name indicates the year of induction into the Hall of Fame.

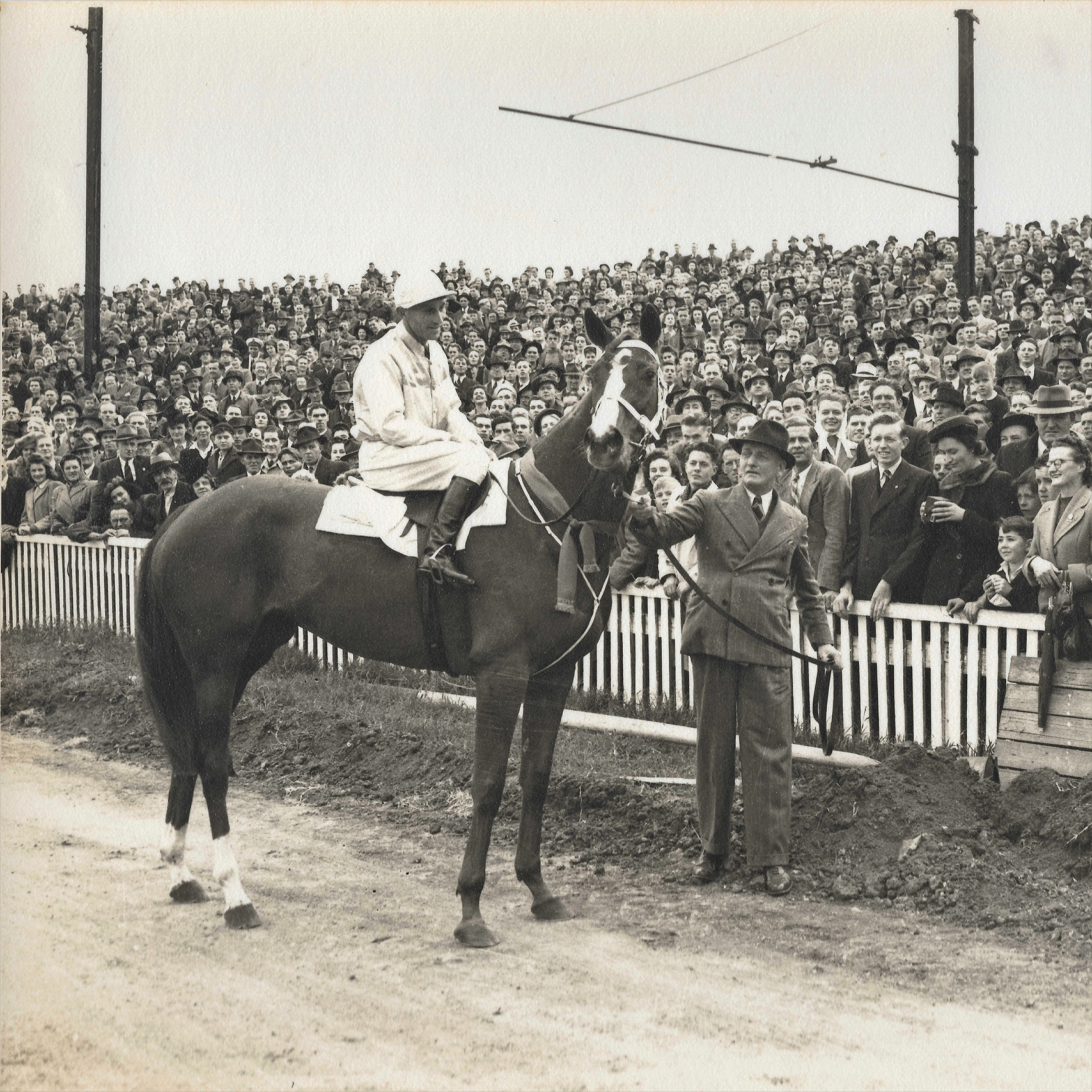
Tranquil Star, 2008 inductee.

== Racehorses ==
- Abercorn (2018)
- Ajax (2004)
- Amounis (2006)
- Aquanita (2018)
- Archer (2017)
- Baguette (2023)
- Balmerino (2019)
- Beau Vite (2021)
- Bernborough (Inaugural - 2001)
- Better Loosen Up (2004)
- Black Caviar (2013)
- Briseis (2015)
- Carbine (Inaugural - 2001)
- Chatham (2005)
- Choisir (2015)
- Comic Court (2009)
- Crisp (2013)
- Dalray (2015)
- Danehill (2015)
- Delta (2013)
- Dulcify (2014)
- Emancipation (2023)
- Eurythmic (2005)
- Flight (2007)
- Galilee (2005)
- Gloaming (2004)
- Grand Flaneur (2007)
- Gunsynd (2005)
- Hall Mark (2019)
- Heroic (2003)
- High Caste (2012)
- Hydrogen (2025)
- Karasi (2018)
- Kingston Town (Inaugural - 2001)
- Leilani (2016)
- Let's Elope (2012)
- Light Fingers (2017)
- Lonhro (2014)
- Luskin Star (2016)
- Mahogany (2025)
- Makybe Diva (2006)
- Malua (2003)
- Manikato (2002)
- Merman (2016)
- Might and Power (2002)
- Miss Andretti (2023)
- Northerly (2010)
- Octagonal (2012)
- Peter Pan (2003)
- Phar Lap (Inaugural - 2001)
- Poitrel (2018)
- Poseidon (2004)
- Rain Lover (2014)
- Red Anchor (2021)
- Redcraze (2012)
- Rising Fast (2002)
- Sailor's Guide (2021)
- Saintly (2017)
- Shannon (2006)
- Sky High (2010)
- So You Think (2019)
- Star Kingdom (2013)
- Strawberry Road (2009)
- Sunline (2002)
- Super Impose (2007)
- Surround (2014)
- Sydeston (2016)
- Takeover Target (2012)
- The Barb (2004)
- Tie the Knot (2021)
- Tobin Bronze (2003)
- Todman (2005)
- Tranquil Star (2008)
- Tulloch (Inaugural - 2001)
- Vain (2003)
- Vo Rogue (2019)
- Wakeful (2002)
- Wenona Girl (2008)
- Winx (2017)

== Jockeys ==
- Harold Badger (2009)
- Darren Beadman (2007)
- Glen Boss (2015)
- Hugh Bowman (2019)
- Scobie Breasley (Inaugural - 2001)
- Edgar Britt (2004)
- Frank Bullock (2006)
- Jim Cassidy (2012)
- Hughie Cairns (2013)
- Billy Cook (2002)
- Tommy Corrigan (2017)
- Frank Dempsey (2008)
- Mick Dittman (2002)
- Bill Duncan (2003)
- Shane Dye (2014)
- Pat Glennon (2005)
- Thomas Hales (Inaugural - 2001)
- Roy Higgins (Inaugural - 2001)
- Ron Hutchinson (2005)
- Pat Hyland (2016)
- Jim Johnson (2009)
- Malcolm Johnston (2018)
- Rae 'Togo' Johnstone (2004)
- Geoff Lane (2013)
- John Letts (2010)
- Bobby Lewis (2002)
- Darby McCarthy (2021)
- Noel McGrowdie (2016)
- William 'Bill' McLachlan (2021)
- George Moore (Inaugural - 2001)
- John Miller (2017)
- Athol Mulley (2012)
- Darby Munro (Inaugural - 2001)
- Jim Munro (2014)
- Damien Oliver (2008)
- James E. Pike (2002)
- Jack Purtell (2004)
- Bill Pyers (2010)
- Ron Quinton (2006)
- Neville Sellwood (2002)
- W.A. 'Billy' Smith (2018)
- Jack Thompson (2005)
- Robert Thompson (2015)
- Brent Thomson (2019)
- Frank Treen Snr (2023)
- Arthur Ward (2007)
- Harry White (2003)
- Bill Williamson (2003)
- Zac Purton (2025)

== Trainers ==
- Angus Armanasco (2002)
- Jim Atkins (2010)
- Neville Begg (2016)
- Fred Best (2007)
- Richard Bradfield (2005)
- Les Bridge (2021)
- Clarry Conners (2023)
- Brian Courtney (2017)
- Bart Cummings (Inaugural - 2001)
- Frank Dalton (2014)
- Jack Denham (2005)
- Lee Freedman (2003)
- Jack Green (2009)
- Cecil Godby (2016)
- George Hanlon (2002)
- John Hawkes (2004)
- Colin Hayes (Inaugural - 2001)
- David Hayes (2008)
- Grahame Heagney (2012)
- Walter S. Hickenbotham (2003)
- Jack Holt (Inaugural - 2001)
- Jim Houlahan (2004)
- Bob Hoysted (2008)
- Fred Hoysted (2002)
- Des Judd (2017)
- Theo Lewis (2012)
- Maurice McCarten (2002)
- Des McCormick (2019)
- Frank McGrath, Sr. (2003)
- Bruce McLachlan (2013)
- Leon Macdonald (2014)
- Brian Mayfield-Smith (2015)
- John F. Meagher (2019)
- Etienne L. de Mestre (2002)
- Jim Moloney (2015)
- Peter Moody (2025)
- Geoff T. Murphy (2005)
- Bayley Payten (2009)
- Tom Payten (2006)
- Harry Plant (2010)
- Lou Robertson (2004)
- James Scobie (Inaugural - 2001)
- John Size (2018)
- Tommy Smith (Inaugural - 2001)
- John Tait (2006)
- Harry Telford (2015)
- Chris Waller (2018)
- Guy Walter (2021)
- Gai Waterhouse (2007)

== Associates ==
- Robert Bagot (2004)
- Alan Bell (2017)
- Joe Brown (2016)
- Bert Bryant (2003)
- Les Carlyon (2016)
- Bob Charley (2021)
- Eduardo Cojuangco (2015)
- David Coles (2013)
- Bill Collins (Inaugural - 2001)
- WS Cox Family (2006)
- Sol Green (2002)
- Theo Green (2002)
- Sir Patrick Hogan (2005)
- Ken Howard (2002)
- Jack & Bob Ingham (2004)
- The Inglis Family (2003)
- Sir George Julius (2013)
- Sir Adrian Knox (Inaugural - 2001)
- Lee Steere Family (2017)
- Lloyd Patrick Lalor (2019)
- Bert Lillye (2015)
- Sir Chester Manifold (Inaugural - 2001)
- John Messara (2021)
- Percy Miller (2008)
- Henry Byron Moore (2010)
- Albert O'Cass (2013)
- A. B. "Banjo" Paterson (Inaugural - 2001)
- Robert (Bob) Peters (2023)
- Percy Sykes (2006)
- The Tait Family (2014)
- Harry Tancred (2007)
- The Thompson Family (Widden Stud) (Inaugural - 2001)
- Sir Edward Deas Thomson (2018)
- George John Watson (2018)
- Eric Welch (2014)
- James White (2002)
- Bill Whittaker (2009)
- Lloyd Williams (2017)
- Sir Edward Williams and Sir Sydney Williams (2019)
- Bert Wolfe (2005)
- Tommy Woodcock (2012)
- The Wootton Family (2002)
- John Tapp (2025)

== Legends ==
- Scobie Breasley (2009)
- Bart Cummings (2008)
- Phar Lap (2007)
- Makybe Diva (2010)
- Tommy "TJ" Smith (2012)
- Carbine (2013)
- George Moore (2015)
- Colin Hayes (2018)
- Black Caviar (2025)
- Winx (2025)

== List of inductees ==
For the full list of and a biography for each of the inductees, see footnote

== See also ==
- Canadian Horse Racing Hall of Fame
- New Zealand Racing Hall of Fame
- Thoroughbred racing in Australia
- Thoroughbred racing in New Zealand
- United States' National Museum of Racing and Hall of Fame
