= Wakeful (horse) =

Australian-bred Thoroughbred racehorse

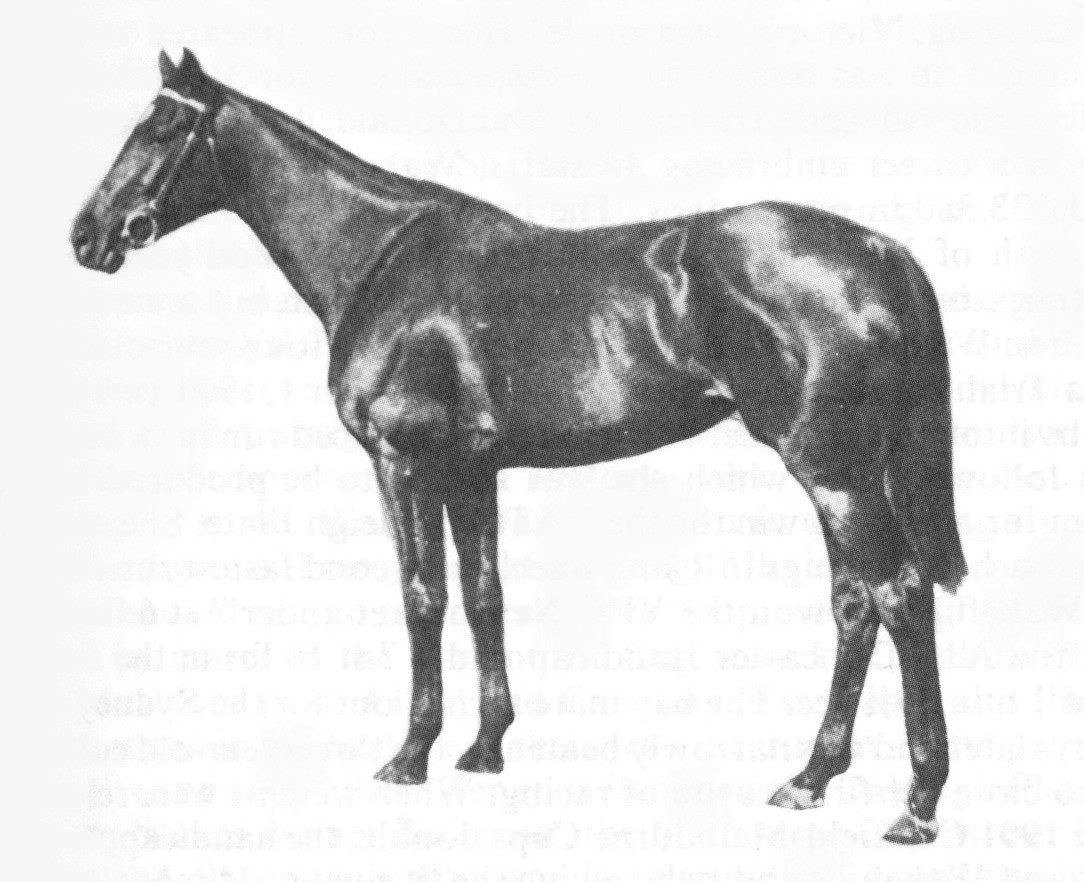
- Sire: Trenton (NZ)
- Grandsire: Musket (GB)
- Dam: Insomnia
- Damsire: Robinson Crusoe
- Sex: Mare
- Foaled: 1896
- Country: Australia
- Colour: Bay
- Breeder: St Albans Stud, Geelong
- Owner: C. Leslie Macdonald, Victoria
- Trainer: Hugh Munro
- Record: 44: 25-12-4
- Earnings: £16,690

Major wins
- Oakleigh Plate (1901); Newmarket Handicap (1901); Doncaster Handicap (1901); Caulfield Stakes (1901, 1902); Melbourne Stakes (1901, 1902, 1903); St George Stakes (1902); Essendon Stakes (1902, 1903); VRC All Aged Stakes (1902); AJC Autumn Stakes (1902); Sydney Cup (1902); AJC All Aged Stakes (1902); AJC Plate (1902); AJC Spring Stakes (1902); AJC Craven Plate (1902); Randwick Plate (1902); C.B.Fisher Plate (1902); October Stakes (1903); VRC Champion Stakes (1903)

Honours
- Australian Racing Hall of Fame (2002); VRC Wakeful Stakes
- Last updated on 20 September 2010

Wakeful was one of the great Thoroughbred mares of the Australian turf. She had shown her versatility by defeating top racehorses at distances from 5½ furlongs to 3 miles. She was unplaced in only three races.

This bay filly was foaled in 1896, and was by the outstanding racehorse and sire, Trenton from Insomnia by Robinson Crusoe. Her pedigree contained mostly good old colonial bloodlines that had proved their worth in Australian racing and breeding. She was offered at the St Aubins stud dispersal sale in 1900 and purchased by Leslie Macdonald for the bargain price of 310 guineas.

== Racing record ==
Wakeful did not commence racing until she was four because of shin soreness. At her third start she won the VATC Oakleigh Plate, followed that by winning the VRC Newmarket Handicap and then the AJC Doncaster Handicap in a race record time of 1:39.75.

Taken to Sydney in 1902, she won all her four starts including the Sydney Cup carrying the impost of 9 stone 7 pounds (60 kg), and ran a race record. Wakeful then went on to win races such as the AJC Plate and VRC Champion Stakes at three miles.

At her last start she ran second in the 1903 VRC Melbourne Cup carrying the huge impost for a mare of 10 stone (64 kg) which was 13 pounds over weight for age and conceded the winner Lord Cardigan 3 st 6 lb (22 kg). Previously no mare had carried more than 9 st 7 lb and none of them finished in the first six. In all she had 44 starts, winning 25 races, was second 12 times and third 4 times.

=== 1902 racebook ===
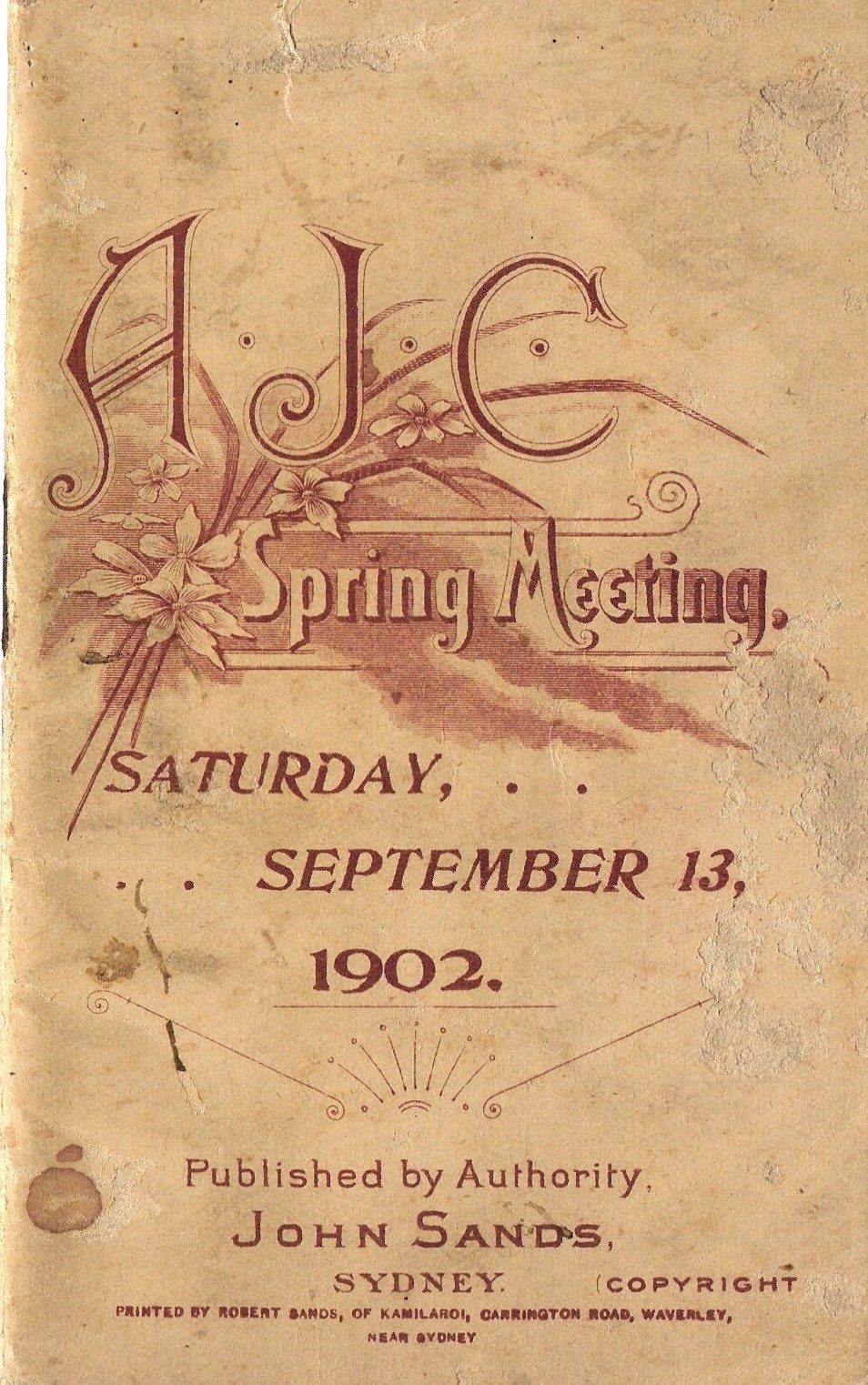
1902 AJC Randwick Plate racebook front cover

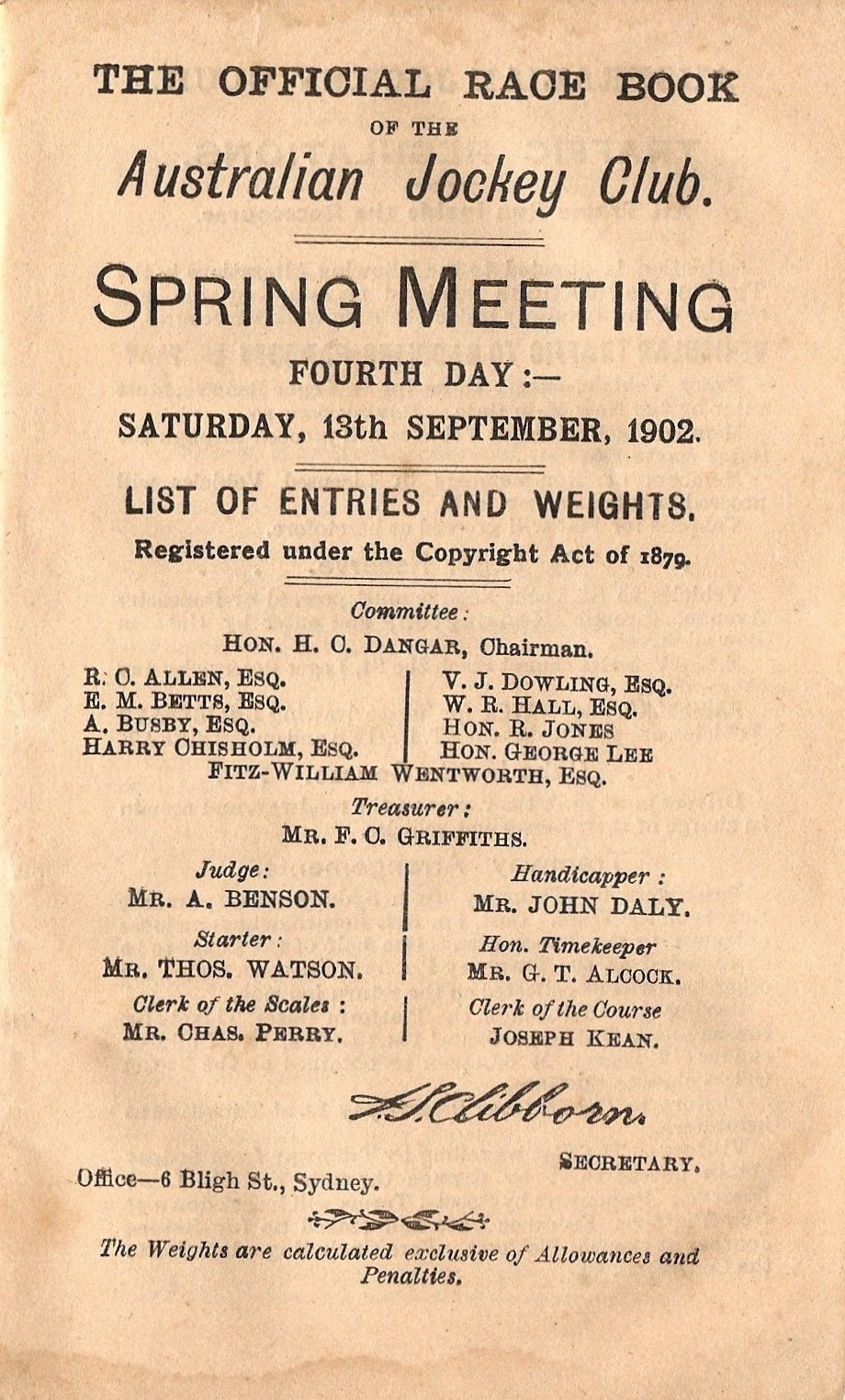
1902 AJC Randwick Plate showing raceday officials

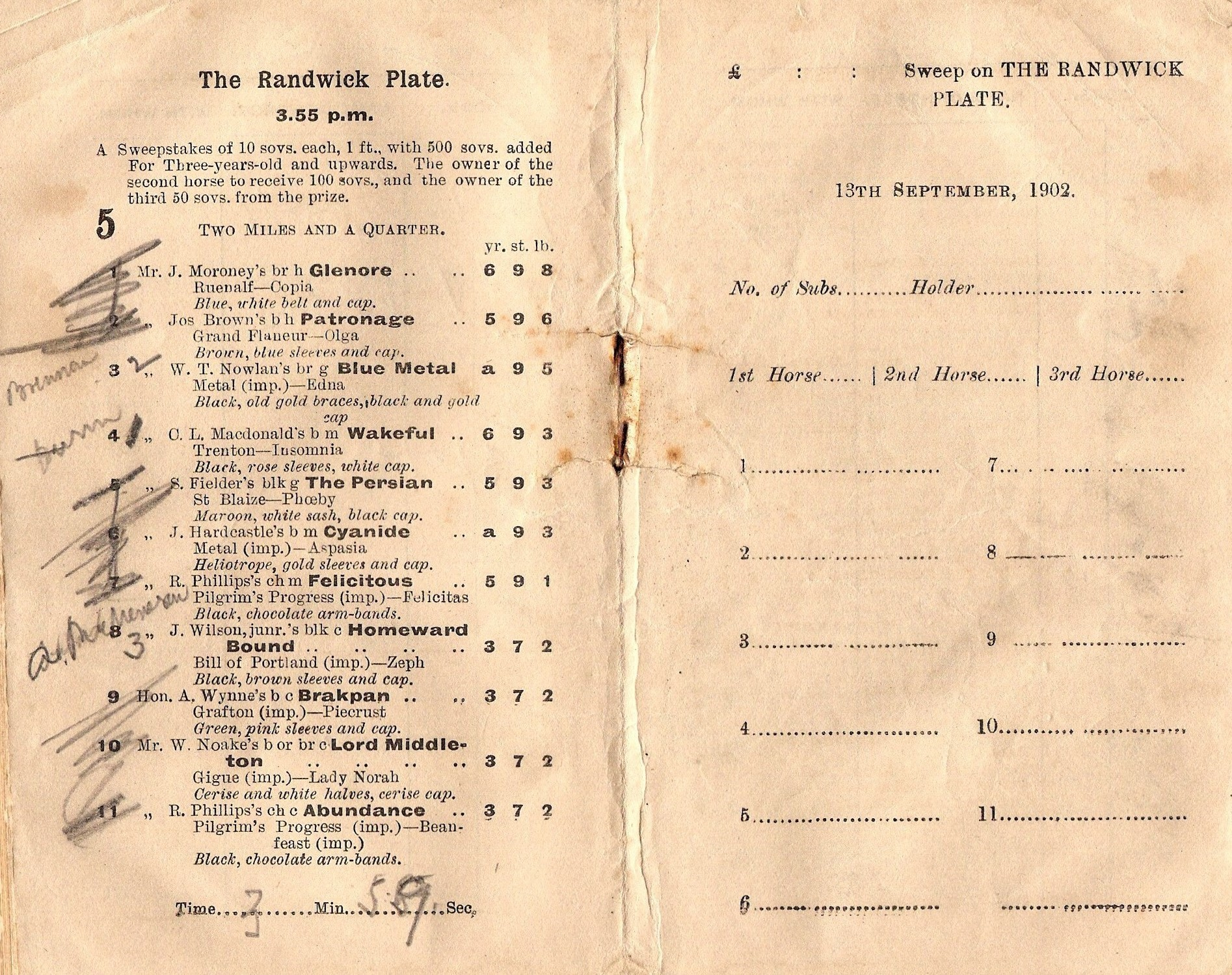
1902 AJC Randwick Plate showing the winner, Wakeful

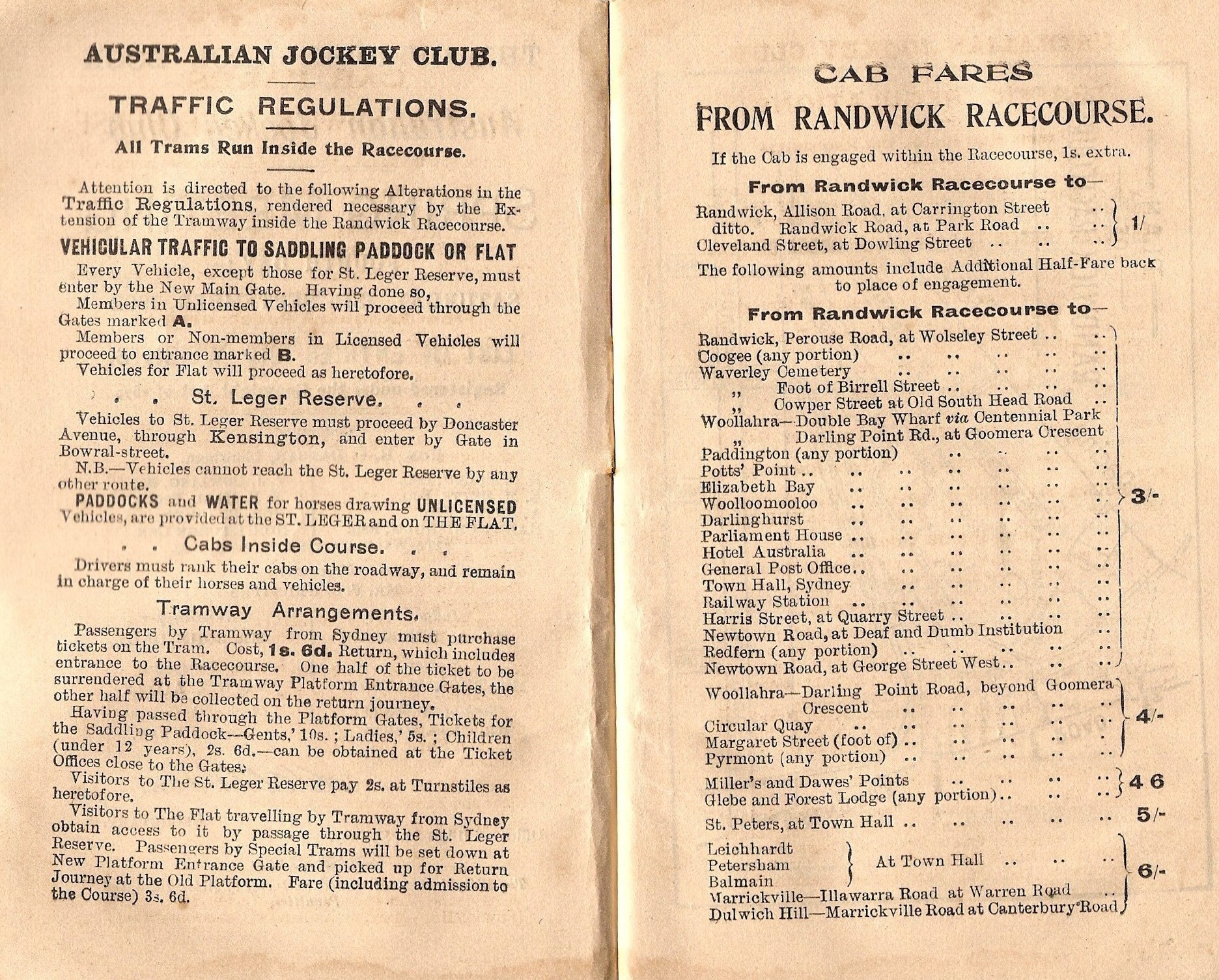
AJC traffic regulations and fares

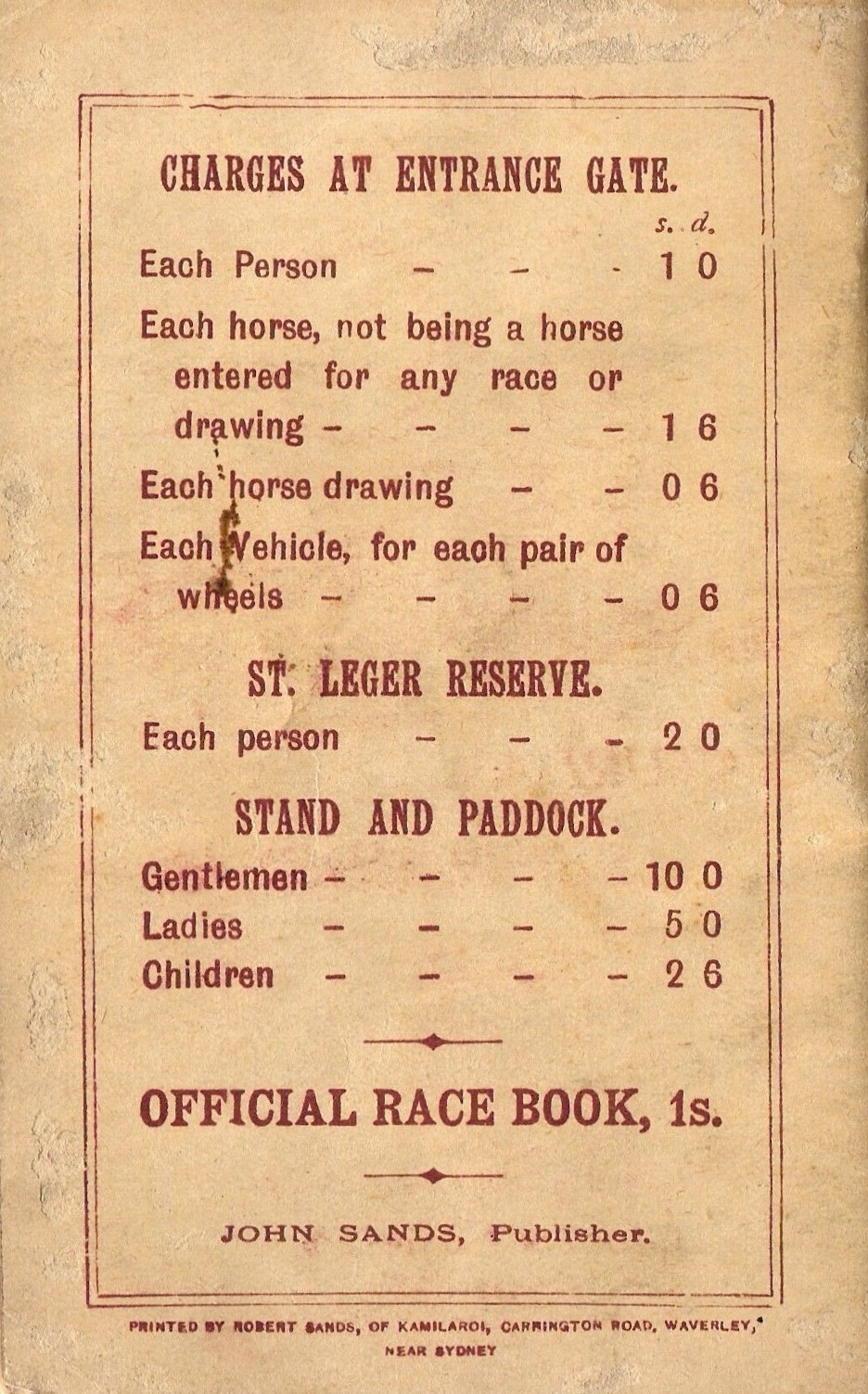
Back cover showing entrance gate charges

=== Race starts ===
As a four-year-old: 1900-01
Result	Date	Race	Venue	Distance	Weight(St)	Time	Jockey	Winner/2nd
2nd	1 Sep 1900	Doona Trial	Caulfield	5f	6.1	1:05.2	Fred Dunn	Ralph 1st
unpl	6 Oct 1900	Paddock Handicap	Flemington	6f	7.3	1:16.7	Fred Dunn	Cillagoe 1st
1st	9 Feb 1901	Oakleigh Plate	Caulfield	5½f	6.9	1:08.0	Fred Dunn	Songbird 2nd
1st	2 Mar 1901	Newmarket Handicap	Flemington	6f	7.6	1:15.7	Fred Dunn	Fulminate 2nd
1st	6 Apr 1901	Doncaster Handicap	Randwick	8f	7.1	1:39.7	S Angwin	Ferryman 2nd
3rd	8 Apr 1901	Sydney Cup	Randwick	2m	7.1	3:32.0	S Angwin	San Fran 1st

As a five-year-old: 1901-02
Result	Date	Race	Venue	Distance	Weight(St)	Time	Jockey	Winner/2nd
1st	12 Oct 1901	Caulfield Stakes	Caulfield	9f	8.1	1:58.2	Fred Dunn	Hymettus 2nd
2nd	19 Oct 1901	Caulfield Cup	Caulfield	12f	9.0	2:35.7	Fred Dunn	Hymettus 1st
1st	2 Nov 1901	Melbourne Stakes	Flemington	10f	8.1	2:09.2	Fred Dunn	San Fran 2nd
unpl	5 Nov 1901	Melbourne Cup	Flemington	2m	8.1	3:30.5	S Anwin	Revenue 1st
2nd	7 Nov 1901	Flying Stakes	Flemington	7f	8.1	1:28.5	Fred Dunn	Sequence 1st
1st	15 Feb 1902	St George Stakes	Caulfield	9f	8.1	1:44.0	Fred Dunn	Combat 2nd
2nd	22 Feb 1902	Futurity Stakes	Caulfield	7f	9.1	1:28.5	Fred Dunn	Sir Foote 1st
1st	1 Mar 1902	Essendon Stakes	Flemington	12f	9.0	2:37.0	Fred Dunn	Barbarossa 2nd
2nd	6 Mar 1902	Champion Stakes	Flemington	3m	9.2	5:43.7	Fred Dunn	La Carabine 1st
1st	8 Mar 1902	All Aged Stakes	Flemington	8f	8.1	1:40.2	Fred Dunn	Bonny Chief 2nd
3rd	8 Mar 1902	Loch Plate	Flemington	14f	9.5	3:07.0	Fred Dunn	Blue Metal 1st
1st	29 Mar 1902	Autumn Stakes	Randwick	12f	9.0	2:38.5	Fred Dunn	Blue Metal 2nd
1st	31 Mar 1902	Sydney Cup	Randwick	2m	9.7	3:28.0	Fred Dunn	Acetine 2nd
1st	2 Apr 1902	All Aged Stakes	Randwick	8f	8.1	1:39.5	Fred Dunn	Sir Leonard 2nd
1st	5 Apr 1902	AJC Plate	Randwick	3m	9.3	5:36.5	J Barden	Haymaker 2nd

As a six-year-old: 1902-03
Result	Date	Race	Venue	Distance	Weight(St)	Time	Jockey	Winner/2nd
1st	6 Sep 1902	Spring Stakes	Randwick	12f	9.1	2:38.2	Fred Dunn	Sir Leonard 2nd
1st	10 Sep 1902	Craven Plate	Randwick	10f	8.1	2:08.0	Fred Dunn	Sir Leonard 2nd
1st	13 Sep 1902	Randwick Plate	Randwick	2m 2f	9.3	4:04.5	Fred Dunn	Blue Metal 2nd
2nd	4 Oct 1902	October Stakes	Flemington	10f	9.5	2:08.7	Fred Dunn	Strata Florida 1st
1st	11 Oct 1902	Caulfield Stakes	Caulfield	9f	8.3	1:57.0	Fred Dunn	Abundance 2nd
1st	13 Oct 1902	Eclipse Stakes	Caulfield	11f	9.4	2:26.0	Fred Dunn	Air Motor 2nd
1st	1 Nov 1902	Melbourne Stakes	Flemington	10f	8.1	2:08.2	Fred Dunn	The Victory 2nd
2nd	6 Nov 1902	Flying Stakes	Flemington	7f	8.1	1:26.7	Fred Dunn	Ibex 1st
1st	8 Nov 1902	CB Fisher Plate	Flemington	12f	9.0	2:37.2	Fred Dunn	Great Scot 2nd
2nd	7 Feb 1903	St George Stakes	Caulfield	8f	8.1	1:41.5	J Barden	Footbolt 1st
1st	14 Feb 1903	St Hellier Stakes	Caulfield	9f	9.6	1:57.5	J Barden	Purser 2nd
3rd	21 Feb 1903	Futurity Stakes	Caulfield	7f	9.1	1:28.2	J Barden	Sir Leonard 1st
1st	18 Feb 1903	Essendon Stakes	Flemington	12f	9.0	2:38.0	J Barden	The Victory 2nd
1st	5 Mar 1903	Champion Stakes	Flemington	3m	9.2	5:29.2	J Barden	Great Scot 2nd
2nd	7 Mar 1903	All Aged Stakes	Flemington	8f	8.1	1:43.0	J Barden	Chantress 1st

As a seven-year-old: 1903-04
Result	Date	Race	Venue	Distance	Weight(St)	Time	Jockey	Winner/2nd
2nd	12 Sep 1903	Spring Stakes	Randwick	12f	9.1	2:36.2	Fred Dunn	Cruciform 1st
3rd	16 Sep 1903	Craven Plate	Randwick	10f	8.1	2:02.7	Fred Dunn	Cruciform 1st
2nd	19 Sep 1903	Randwick Plate	Randwick	2m 2f	9.3	4:17.5	Fred Dunn	Lord Cardigan 1st
1st	3 Oct 1903	October Stakes	Flemington	10f	9.6	2:10.0	Fred Dunn	Hauturier 2nd
unpl	10 Oct 1903	Caulfield Stakes	Caulfield	9f	8.1	1:56.7	Fred Dunn	Abundance 1st
1st	14 Oct 1903	Eclipse Stakes	Caulfield	11f	8.1	2:24.0	Fred Dunn	Hauturier 2nd
1st	31 Oct 1903	Melbourne Stakes	Flemington	10f	8.1	2:09.0	Fred Dunn	Lord Cardigan 2nd
2nd	3 Nov 1903	Melbourne Cup	Flemington	2m	10.0	3:29.2	Fred Dunn	Lord Cardigan 1st

== Stud record ==
After finishing racing and going to stud, Wakeful produced ten foals including the 1918 Melbourne Cup winner Night Watch. Some of her other colts were Blairgour (1907) and Baverstock (1911).

== Honours ==
The Wakeful Stakes is a Group 2 race named in her honour, in which 13 fillies have gone on to win the Oaks. In 2002 Wakeful was inducted into the Australian Racing Hall of Fame.

== See also ==
- Repeat winners of horse races
