= Big Philou =

New Zealand-bred Thoroughbred racehorse

- Sire: Le Filou
- Grandsire: Vatellor
- Dam: Pink Lady
- Damsire: Contact
- Sex: Stallion
- Foaled: 1965
- Country: New Zealand
- Colour: Bay or Brown
- Trainer: Bart Cummings

Major wins
- Caulfield Cup (1969); VRC Queen Elizabeth Stakes (1970); Underwood Stakes (1970)

Big Philou (foaled in 1965) was a notable New Zealand bred Thoroughbred racehorse. He was by the good sire Le Filou (imported from France) from Pink Lady by Contact and he was trained by Bart Cummings.

He is best remembered for the controversy surrounding his withdrawal from the 1969 VRC Melbourne Cup when as the hot favourite he was the victim of a doping scandal and was withdrawn from the race 39 minutes before the start.

Jockey Roy Higgins believed that the horse was a certainty to win the race.

Rain Lover went on to win the Cup and created history as the first back-to-back winner since Archer in 1861 and 1862.

Although he missed out on winning a Melbourne Cup the horse did record wins in the 1969 VATC Caulfield Cup, 1970 VRC Queen Elizabeth Stakes (Autumn) and the 1970 VATC Underwood Stakes.

== Pedigree ==
Pedigree of Big Philou
Sire Le Filou 1946	Vatellor 1933	Vatout	Prince Chimay
Sire Le Filou 1946	Vatellor 1933	Vatout	Vasthi
Sire Le Filou 1946	Vatellor 1933	Lady Elinor	Teddy*
Sire Le Filou 1946	Vatellor 1933	Lady Elinor	Madame Royale
Sire Le Filou 1946	Fileuse 1941	Casterari	Fiterari
Sire Le Filou 1946	Fileuse 1941	Casterari	Castleline
Sire Le Filou 1946	Fileuse 1941	Diseuse	Diomedes
Sire Le Filou 1946	Fileuse 1941	Diseuse	Boxeuse*
Dam Pink Lady 1956	Contact 1931	Marconigram	Abbots Trace
Dam Pink Lady 1956	Contact 1931	Marconigram	Marcia Blanche
Dam Pink Lady 1956	Contact 1931	Air Lady	Magpie
Dam Pink Lady 1956	Contact 1931	Air Lady	Bandurria
Dam Pink Lady 1956	Cuddlesome 1948	Red Mars	Hyperion
Dam Pink Lady 1956	Cuddlesome 1948	Red Mars	Red Garter
Dam Pink Lady 1956	Cuddlesome 1948	Fondle	Leighton
Dam Pink Lady 1956	Cuddlesome 1948	Fondle	Caress

* Big Philou is inbred 4S x 5S to the stallion Teddy, meaning that he appears fourth generation and fifth generation (via Boxeuse) on the sire side of his pedigree.
