= Rain Lover =

Australian Thoroughbred racehorse

- Sire: Latin Lover (GB)
- Grandsire: Ribot
- Dam: Rain Spot
- Damsire: Valognes (GB)
- Sex: Stallion
- Foaled: 1964
- Died: 1989 (aged 24–25)
- Country: Australia
- Colour: Bay
- Breeder: Clifford A. Reid
- Owner: Clifford A. Reid
- Trainer: Mick L. Robins
- Record: 46:17-10-11
- Earnings: A$188,100

Major wins
- Adelaide Cup (1968); Mackinnon Stakes (1968); C.B.Fisher Plate (1968); Melbourne Cup (1968, 1969); Chipping Norton Stakes (1969); VRC Queen Elizabeth Stakes (1969); Craiglee Stakes (1969); Underwood Stakes (1969); St George Stakes (1969, 1970); VRC Queens Plate (1970); AJC Autumn Stakes (1970)

Awards
- Australian Horse of the Year (1969)

Honours
- Australian Racing Hall of Fame (2014); SAJC Rain Lover Plate at Morphettville Racecourse
- Last updated on 10 March 2014

Rain Lover (1964–1989) was a champion Australian Thoroughbred racehorse best remembered for his back-to-back wins in the 1968 and 1969 VRC Melbourne Cup.

== Background ==
Rain Lover was sired by the good racehorse, Latin Lover (GB) (a son of the unbeaten Ribot). His dam Rain Spot was by Valognes (GB). He was owned and bred by Clifford A. Reid, who won the 1945 Melbourne Cup with Rainbird. Trainer Mick L. Robins, a former coal miner from Broken Hill, New South Wales had obtained his trainer's licence just three months before he took over Rain Lover's conditioning.

== Racing career ==
In his first Melbourne Cup triumph, under jockey Jim Johnson, Rain Lover won by a record eight-length margin and in a record time of 3:19.1.

Controversy surrounded his second win as the hot favourite and heavily backed Big Philou trained by Bart Cummings was the victim of a doping scandal and was withdrawn from the race 39 minutes before the start. Burdened with 9 st. 7 lbs. Rain Lover still went on to win the race in game fashion by a neck from Alsop and created history as the first back-to-back winner since Archer in 1861 and 1862.

Amongst his other major wins were the SAJC Adelaide Cup, VATC St George Stakes (twice) and the AJC Chipping Norton Stakes.

== Stud record ==
Retired to stud in 1970, Rain Lover enjoyed moderate success as a sire before his death in 1989. One of his best winners being Princess Veronica (VATC Easter Cup).
