= 1965 Melbourne Cup =

Edition of the Melbourne Cup

- Melbourne Cup
- Location: Flemington Racecourse
- Date: 2 Nov 1965
- Distance: 2 miles
- Winning horse: Light Fingers
- Winning time: 3:21.1
- Final odds: 15/1
- Jockey: Roy Higgins
- Trainer: Bart Cummings
- Owner: W J (Wally) Broderick
- Conditions: Fast
- Surface: Turf

A furlong and a half to go and Ziema's hit the front, Light Fingers under the whip trying to run him down from Yangtze, Midlander and then Tobin Bronze and Prince Grant. It's Ziema in front, Light Fingers throwing in a desperate challenge. Ziema about a neck in front, Light Fingers pegging him back. Light Fingers goes to Ziema hit the line locked together. Dead heat! A dead heat in the Melbourne Cup!

— Commentator Bill Collins describes the climax of the race

The 1965 Melbourne Cup was a two-mile handicap horse race which took place on Tuesday, 2 November 1965. The race, run over 2 miles (3,218.7 m), at Flemington Racecourse.

The race won by Light Fingers, trained by Bart Cummings who won the first of what would end up being a record 12 Melbourne Cups. Ziema ran second also trained by Cummings making it the first of five times he trained the quinella.

== Field ==
This is a list of horses which ran in the 1965 Melbourne Cup.

| Place | Horse | Trainer | Jockey |
|---|---|---|---|
| 1st | Light Fingers | Bart Cummings | Roy Higgins |
| 2nd | Ziema | Bart Cummings | John Miller |
| 3rd | Midlander | Bob Hoysted | N Pyatt |
| 4th | Yangtze | R Dini | H White |
| 5th | Prince Grant | Tommy J. Smith | G Podmore |
| 6th | Prince Camillo | R Fisher | G Gumblestone |
| 7th | Red Willam | Owen Lynch | R Mallyon |
| 8th | Tobin Bronze | H G Heagney | J Stocker |
| 9th | Craftsman | Andy White | P Hyland |
| 10th | Tasman Lad | H H Riley | D Cameron |
| 11th | Mission | J F Quigley | N Eastwood |
| 12th | Rosicombe | G Alessio | F Blackburn |
| 13th | Sir Wynyard | A G Smith | A Lister |
| 14th | Pleasanton | George Hanlon | W A Smith |
| 15th | Jovial Knight | H G Heagney | N Miffin |
| 16th | Strauss | J Green | D Lake |
| 17th | Sail Away | S A Brown | Bill Skelton |
| 18th | The Dip | Bart Cummings | F Reys |
| 19th | Hunting Horn | L J Peterson | A May |
| 20th | Dalento | Jack Besanko | I Saunders |
| 21st | Zinga Lee | W J McNabb | B Gilders |
| 22nd | Piper's Son | M F Anderson | G Moore |
| 23rd | Alagon | George Hanlon | R Selkrig |
| Fell | Bore Head | R Dillon | F Clarke |
| Fell | Matlock | George Hanlon | J Johnson |
| Fell | River Seine | R Prendergast | R Hawkins |

== Attendance ==
Jean Shrimpton and her then boyfriend Terence Stamp made a highly publicised visit to the Cup at a time when foreign celebrities were not common in Australia.
