= Cecil Godby =

Australian jockey and horse trainer

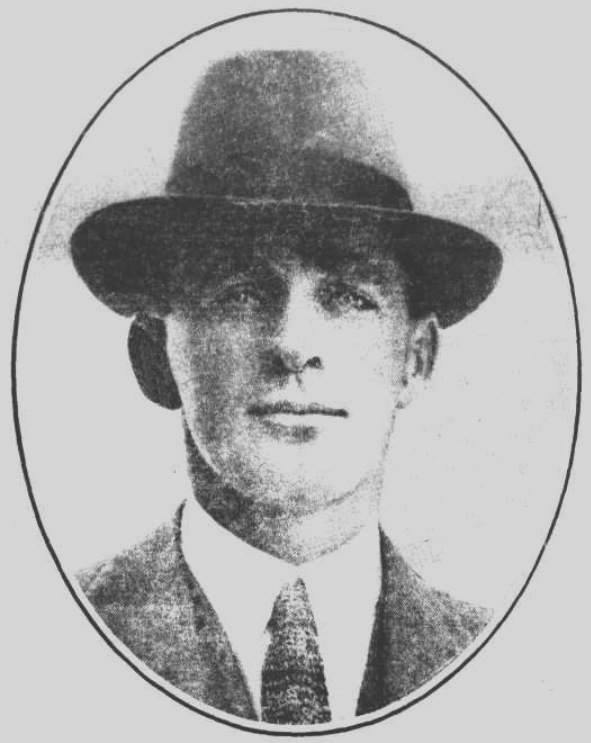
Cecil Godby, 1922.

Cecil Godby (1879 - 1963) was an Australian racehorse jockey and trainer who was inducted into the Australian Racing Hall of Fame in 2016.

== Racing career ==
For almost half a century the name of Godby was one to conjure with in Australian racing. Cecil Godby was one of four brothers who each became successful jockeys to varying degrees, and yet they hailed from a non-racing family. Charles, Cecil, Frank and Norman Godby were born in that order and all in the space of five years from 1883 to 1887, while a sister, Dorothy, came along three years later.

As a jockey, Cecil Godby won the VRC Maribyrnong Plate on the horse Ibex in 1900.

After retiring from being a jockey he became a horse trainer and achieved success in the early 1920s training the horses of Jack Corteen and George Tye notably training the successful racehorse Heroic, although he was disqualified for twelve months in 1924 which he described as an incorrect decision for the rest of his career. After his disqualification he returned to training for another twenty years.

As of 1928 he had established himself at the stable Cambria House on Caulfield. One of his horses won a race in 1955, earning praise of his skill as an "old master" of horse training.
