= Jim Johnson (jockey) =

Australian jockey (1929–2021)

Personal information
- Born: 1929 Australia
- Died: 25 January 2021) (aged 92) ?
- Occupation: Jockey

Horse racing career
- Sport: Horse racing
- Career wins: Triple winner of Melbourne Cup (1963, 1968 and 1969); W.S. Cox Plate (1966, 1967); Caulfield Cup (1967); Adelaide Jockeys Premiership x4

Honours
- Australian Racing Hall of Fame

Significant horses
- Rain Lover, Tobin Bronze

Jim Johnson (1929 – 25 February 2021) was an Australian Hall of Fame jockey who is remembered primarily for winning the Melbourne Cup on Gatum Gatum in 1963 and twice on Rain Lover - 1968 & '69.

== Career ==
Johnson is one of the few jockeys to win the Melbourne Cup three times. He also won the Cox Plate and Caulfield Cup as well as winning the Adelaide Jockeys Premiership four times and the Melbourne Jockeys’ Premiership in 1967.

He was also noted for his unusual riding style of virtually standing up. He also rode in a strange, jerky way. Despite his unorthodox style, Johnson was often supreme in tight finishes, being one of the strongest whip riders of his time.

He was honoured after his retirement as a jockey with riding a tribute lap aboard the New Zealand thoroughbred Might and Power around the Flemington Racetrack at the beginning of the Melbourne Cup.

He was inducted to the South Australian Racing Hall of Fame in 2003 and the Australian Racing Hall of Fame in August 2009.

=== Major wins ===
- Adelaide Cup: Cheong Sam (1962)
- Caulfield Cup: Tobin Bronze (1967)
- Cox Plate: Tobin Bronze (1966, 1967)
- Melbourne Cup: Gatum Gatum (1963), Rain Lover (1968, 1969)

== Personal life ==
Johnson lived much of his life in Adelaide South Australia, though after the death of his partner Patricia Delores Mary Prendagast, he returned to Melbourne to be close to his family.

== Death ==
Jim Johnson died on 25 February 2021, aged 92.
