= Galilee (horse) =

New Zealand-bred Thoroughbred racehorse

- Sire: Alcimedes
- Grandsire: Alycidon
- Dam: Galston
- Damsire: Balloch
- Sex: Gelding
- Foaled: 1963
- Died: 1990 (aged 26–27)
- Country: New Zealand
- Colour: Brown
- Breeder: Trelawney Stud
- Owner: Mr & Mrs M. L. Bailey
- Trainer: Bart Cummings
- Record: 36:18–6–4
- Earnings: A$169,970

Major wins
- Toorak Handicap (1966); Caulfield Cup (1966); Melbourne Cup (1966); C.B.Fisher Plate (1966); VRC Queens Plate (1967); VRC Queen Elizabeth Stakes (1967); AJC Autumn Stakes (1967); Sydney Cup (1967); Memsie Stakes (1968); Turnbull Stakes (1968)

Honours
- Australian Racing Hall of Fame

Galilee (1963−1990) was a New Zealand bred Thoroughbred racehorse who became one of the most successful racehorses in Australia. Galilee was the first and is still the only horse to win the Caulfield, Melbourne and Sydney Cups in one season.

== Background ==
Galilee was a bay gelding who was foaled in 1963 at Trelawney Stud, Cambridge, New Zealand. Galilee was sired by Alcimedes*, from the mare Galston by Balloch*. He was purchased (and later trained) by champion trainer Bart Cummings for £3,780 in New Zealand. Galilee was owned by an Adelaide builder, Max Bailey and his wife Venice, who also raced Ziema, who ran second in the 1965 Caulfield and Melbourne Cups.

== Racing career ==
Ridden by jockey J. J. Miller, in the 1967 Sydney Cup he carried 9 stone 7 pounds (60 kg) to victory and won the race easily by six lengths, whilst in the 1966 Melbourne Cup, carrying 8 stone 13 pounds (57 kg) he decisively defeated his stablemate Light Fingers, who had won the cup the previous year.

The champion racehorse also easily won such races as the Queen Elizabeth Stakes, the Toorak Handicap and the C.B. Fisher Plate, in which he defeated champion middle-distance horse Tobin Bronze.

Bart Cummings has often referred to Galilee as the best horse he has trained. It was not until Saintly, who won the Cox Plate-Melbourne Cup double in 1996, came along that comparisons were made.

Galilee was inducted into the Australian Racing Hall of Fame.

== Retirement ==
After retirement Galilee spent his years at the family horse stud, Beaufields near Gawler, South Australia. He is buried at the Gawler Racetrack in South Australia.
