= Peter Young Stakes =

Australian horse race

Peter Young Stakes (registered as St George Stakes)
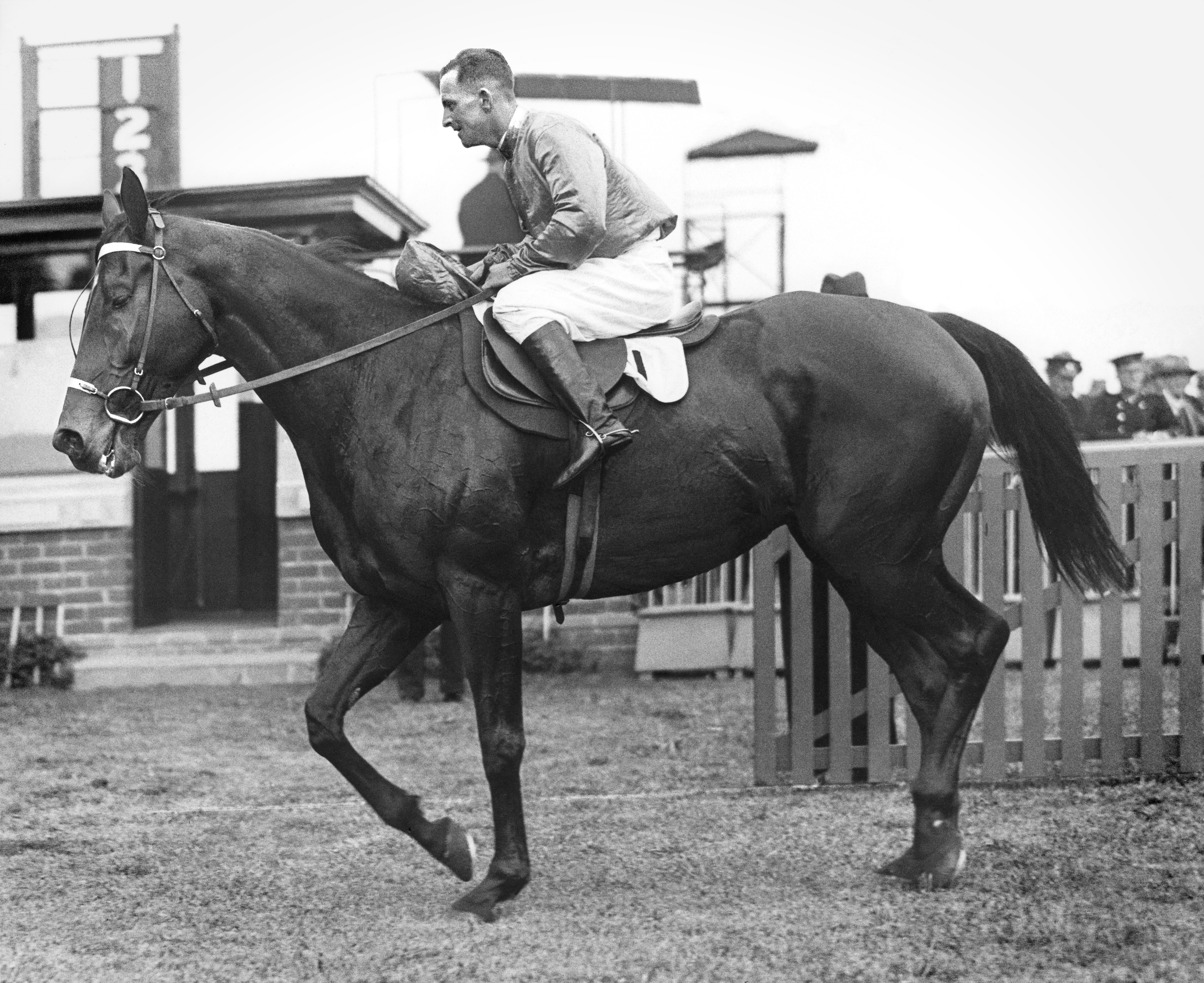
- Amounis, 1930 winner
- Class: Group 2
- Location: Caulfield Racecourse
- Inaugurated: 1900
- Race type: Thoroughbred
- Sponsor: Sportsbet (2026)

Race information
- Distance: 1,800 metres
- Surface: Turf
- Qualification: Maidens ineligible
- Weight: Weight for Age
- Purse: $500,000 (2026)

The Peter Young Stakes, registered as the St George Stakes, is a Melbourne Racing Club Group 2 Thoroughbred horse race held under weight for age conditions over a distance of 1800 metres at Caulfield racecourse, Melbourne, Australia in late February.

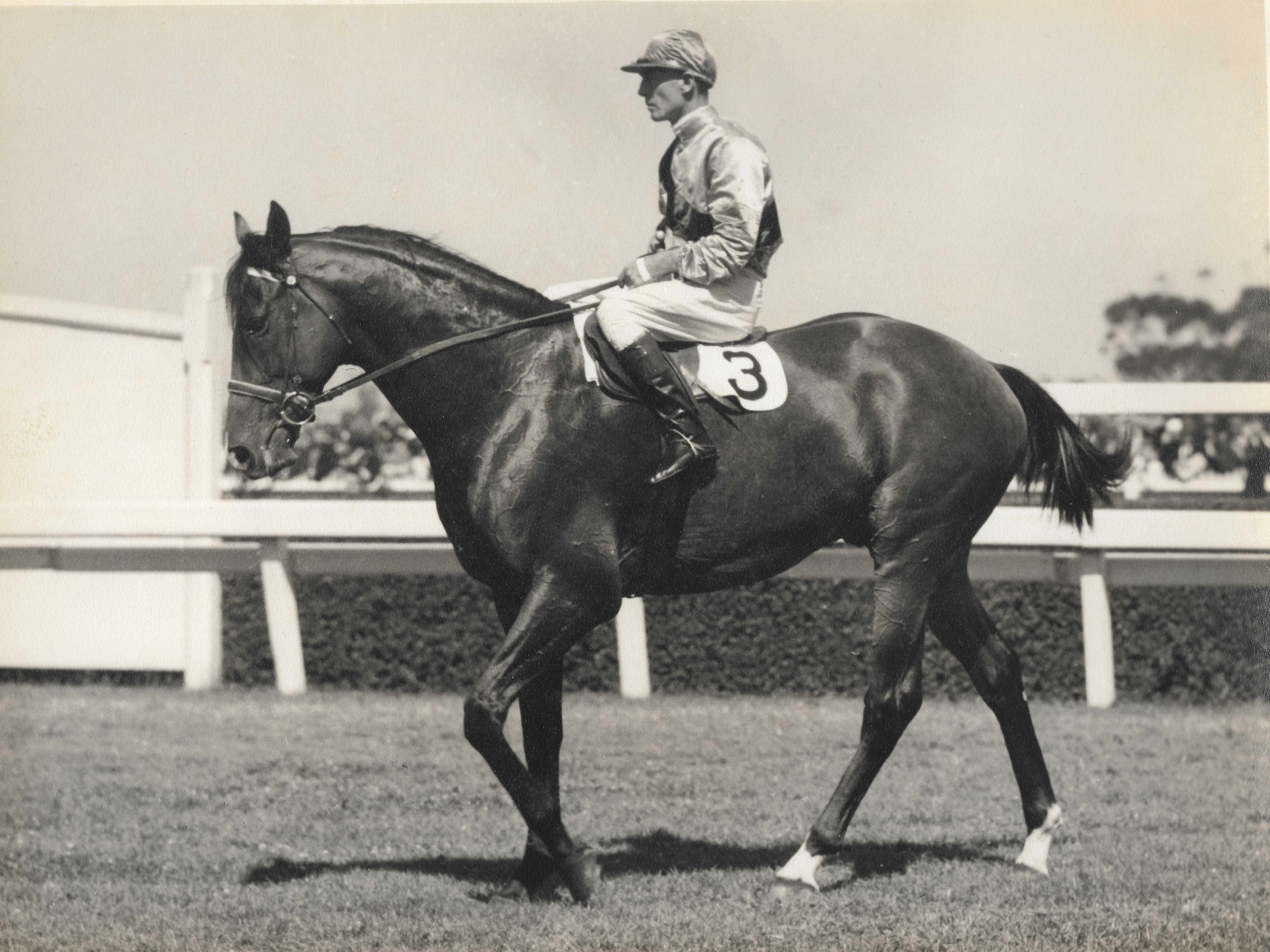
High Caste, 1940 & 1942 winner

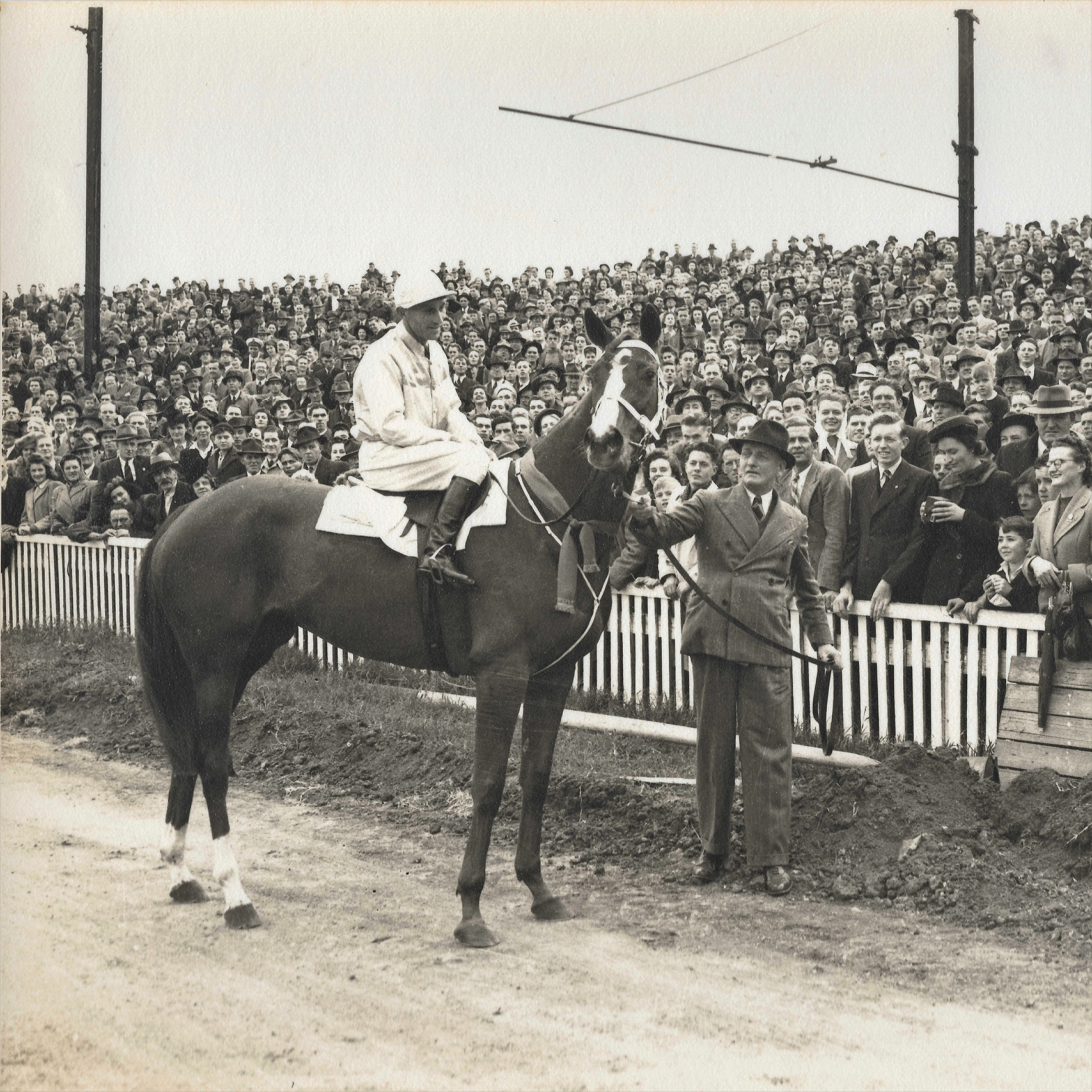
Tranquil Star, 1941, 1944, 1945 winner

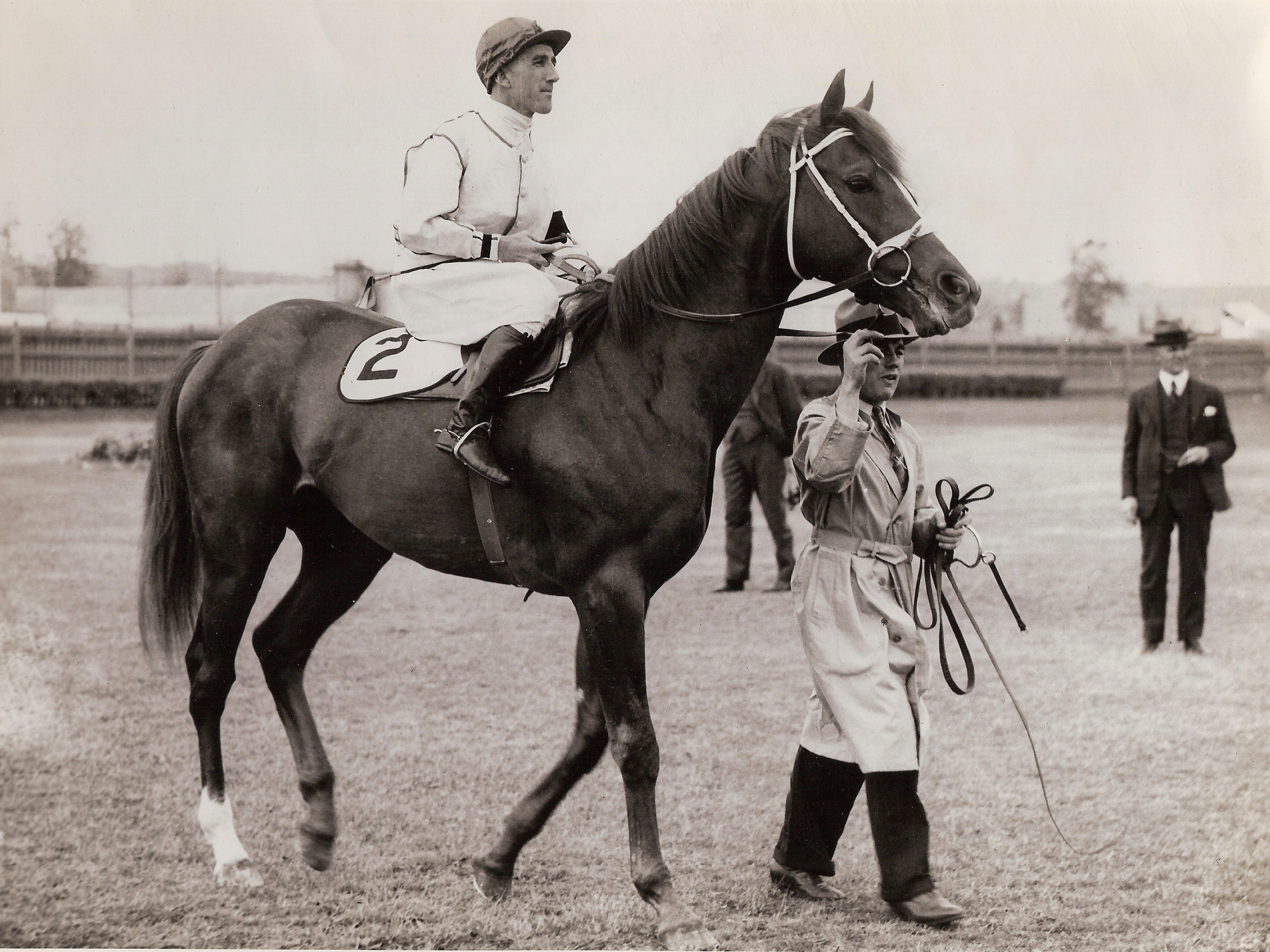
Ajax, 1939 winner

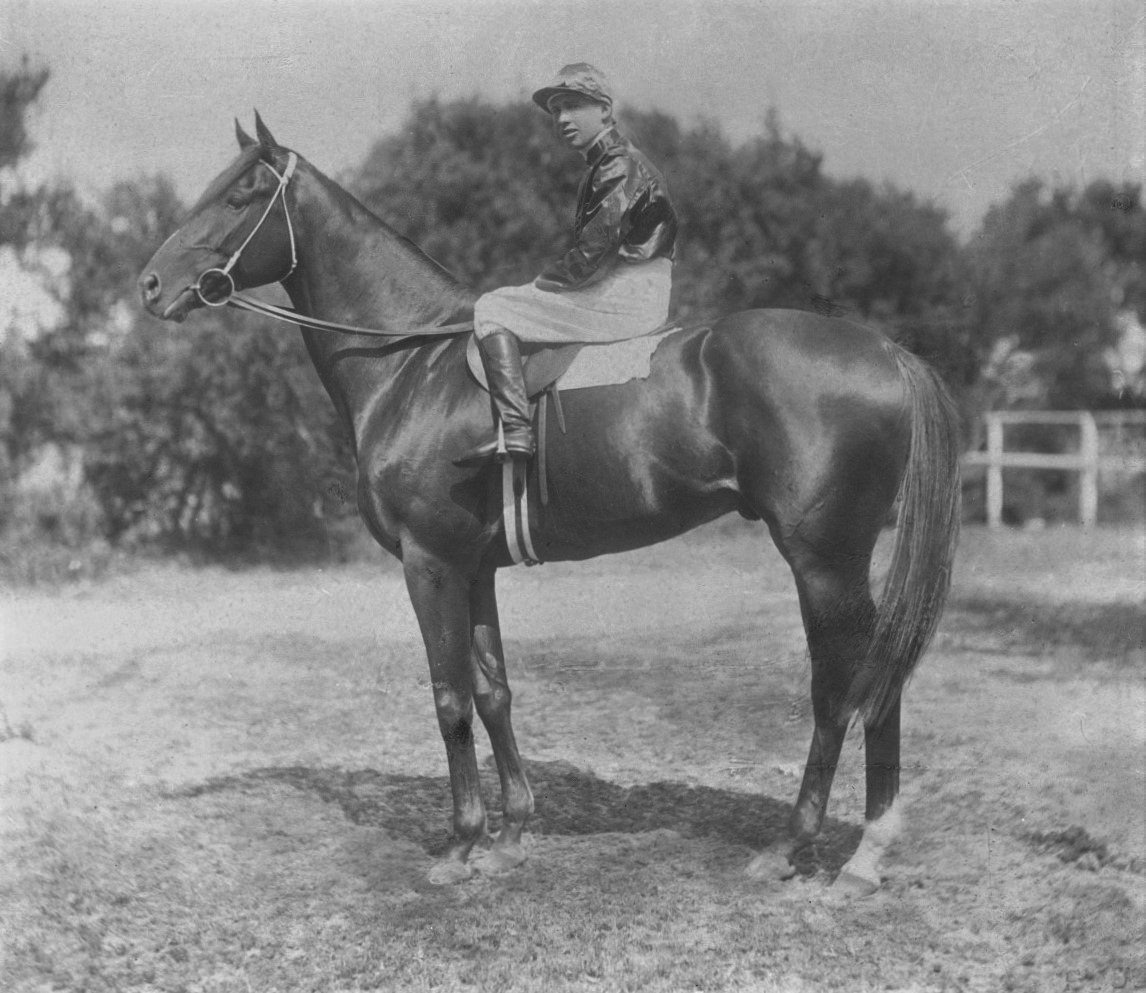
Eurythmic, 1922 winner

== History ==
The race was renamed in 2012 in honour of former Chairman of the Melbourne Racing Club, Peter Young who was involved in the rebranding of the Victoria Amateur Turf Club to the Melbourne Racing Club and the construction of the Sir Rupert Clarke Grandstand at Caulfield Racecourse.

=== Name ===
- 1900–2011 – St George Stakes
- 2012 onwards – Peter Young Stakes

=== Distance ===
- 1900–1903 – 1 mile (~1600 metres)
- 1904–1972 – 1 1/8 miles (~1800 metres)
- 1973–1978 – 1800 metres
- 1979 – 1200 metres
- 1980–1981 – 1800 metres
- 1982 – 1600 metres
- 1983 – 1800 metres
- 1984–1987 – 1600 metres
- 1988–1994 – 1800 metres
- 1995 – 2000 metres
- 1996 onwards – 1800 metres

=== Grade ===
- 1900–1978 – Principal Race.
- 1979 onwards – Group 2

=== Venue ===
During World War II the event was held at Flemington Racecourse. In 1996 the event was held at Flemington Racecourse due to reconstruction of Caulfield Racecourse.

=== 1949 and 1951 racebooks ===
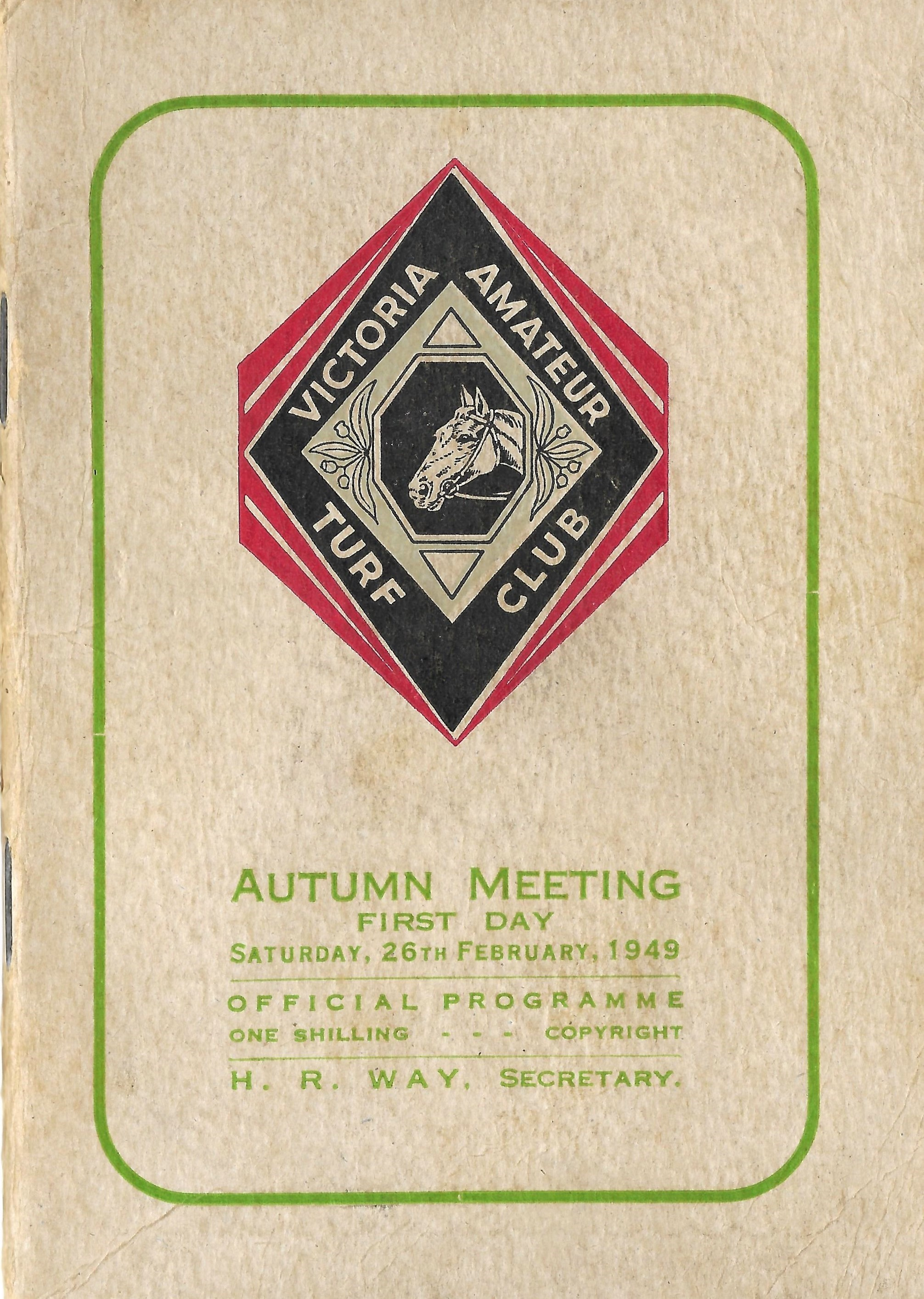
1949 VATC St George Stakes racebook front cover

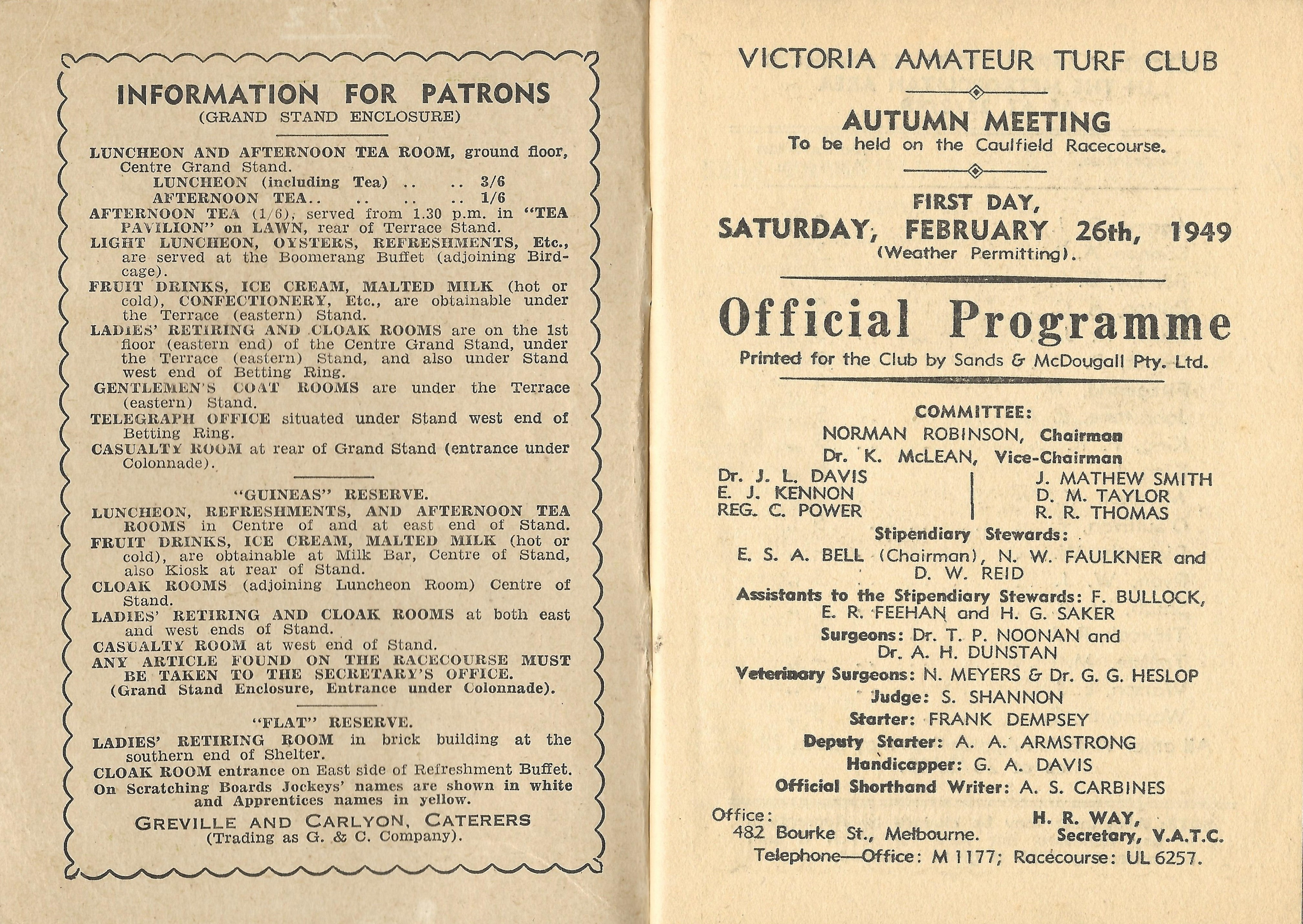
1949 VATC St George Stakes raceday officials

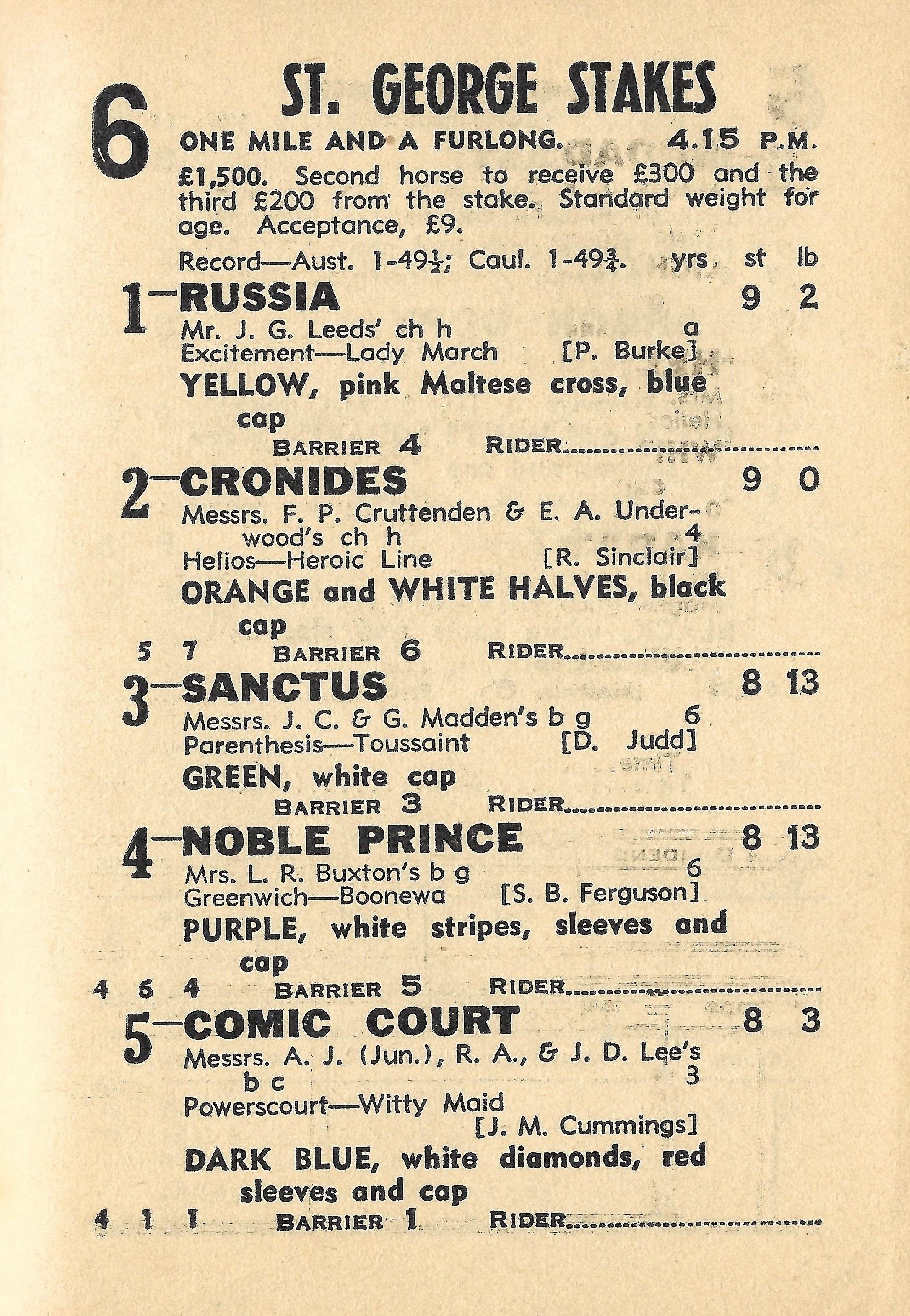
1949 VATC St George Stakes starters and results

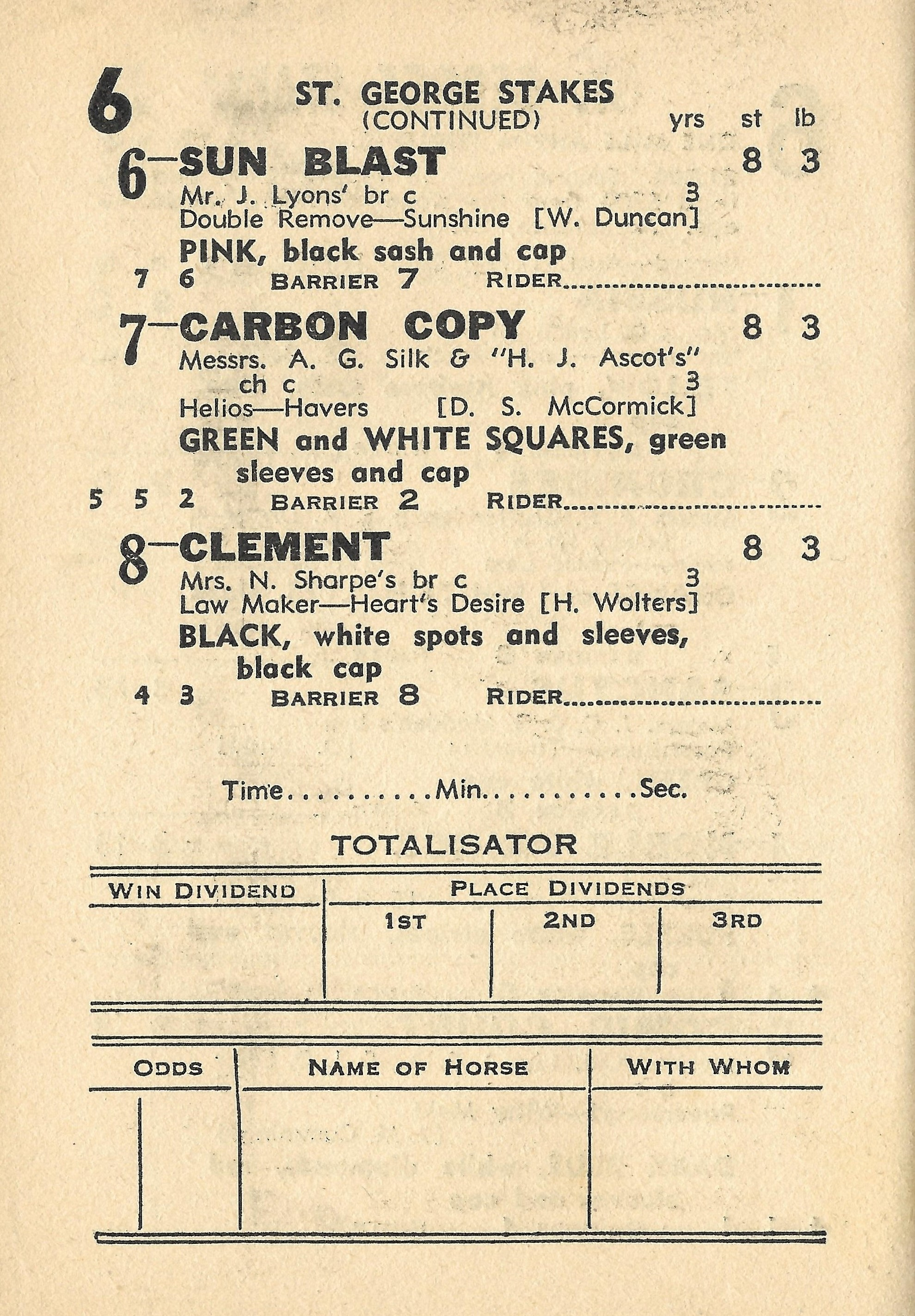
1949 VATC St George Stakes showing the winner, Carbon Copy

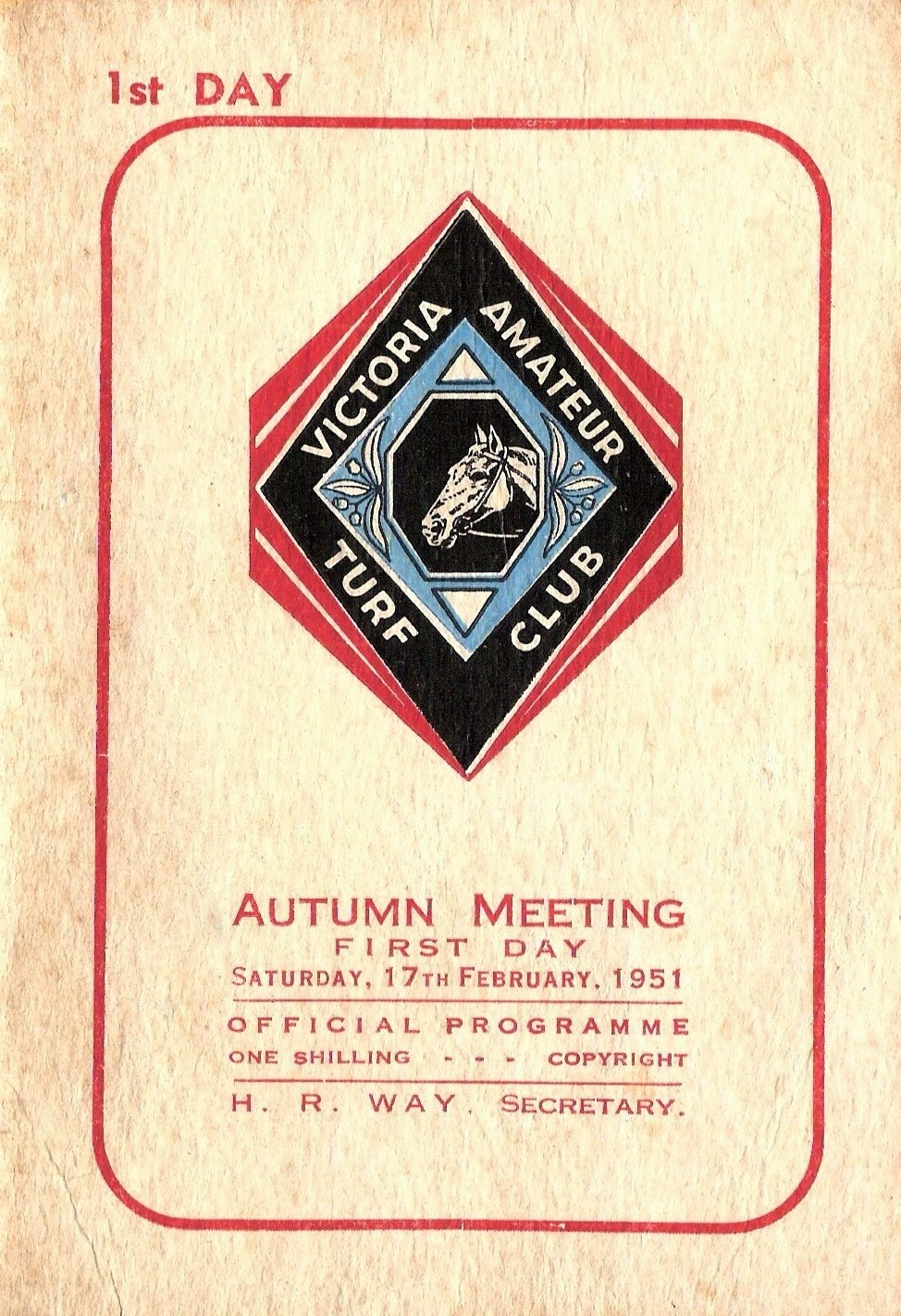
1951 VATC St George Stakes racebook front cover

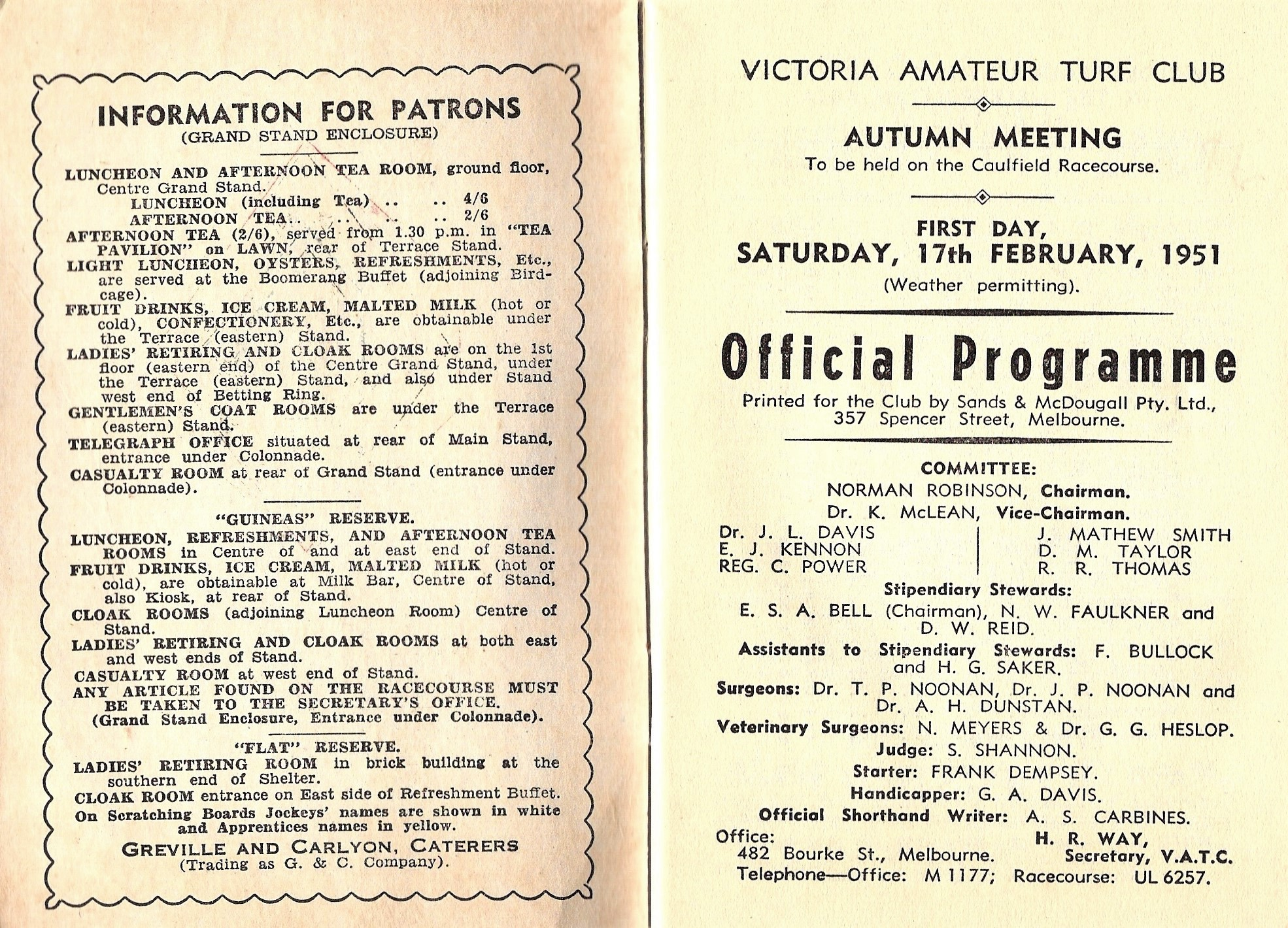
1951 VATC St George Stakes officials and patron information

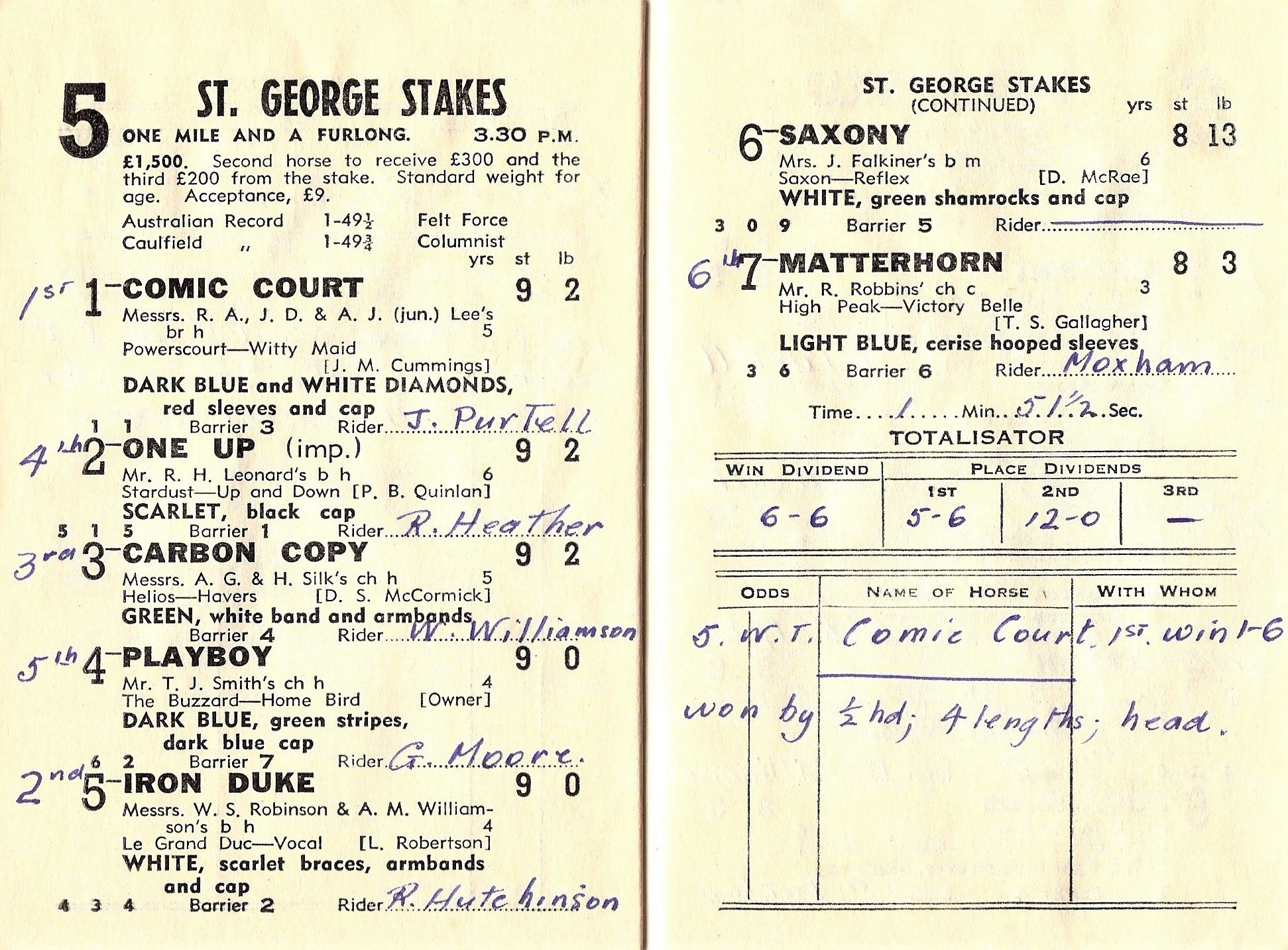
1951 VATC St George Stakes showing the winner, Comic Court

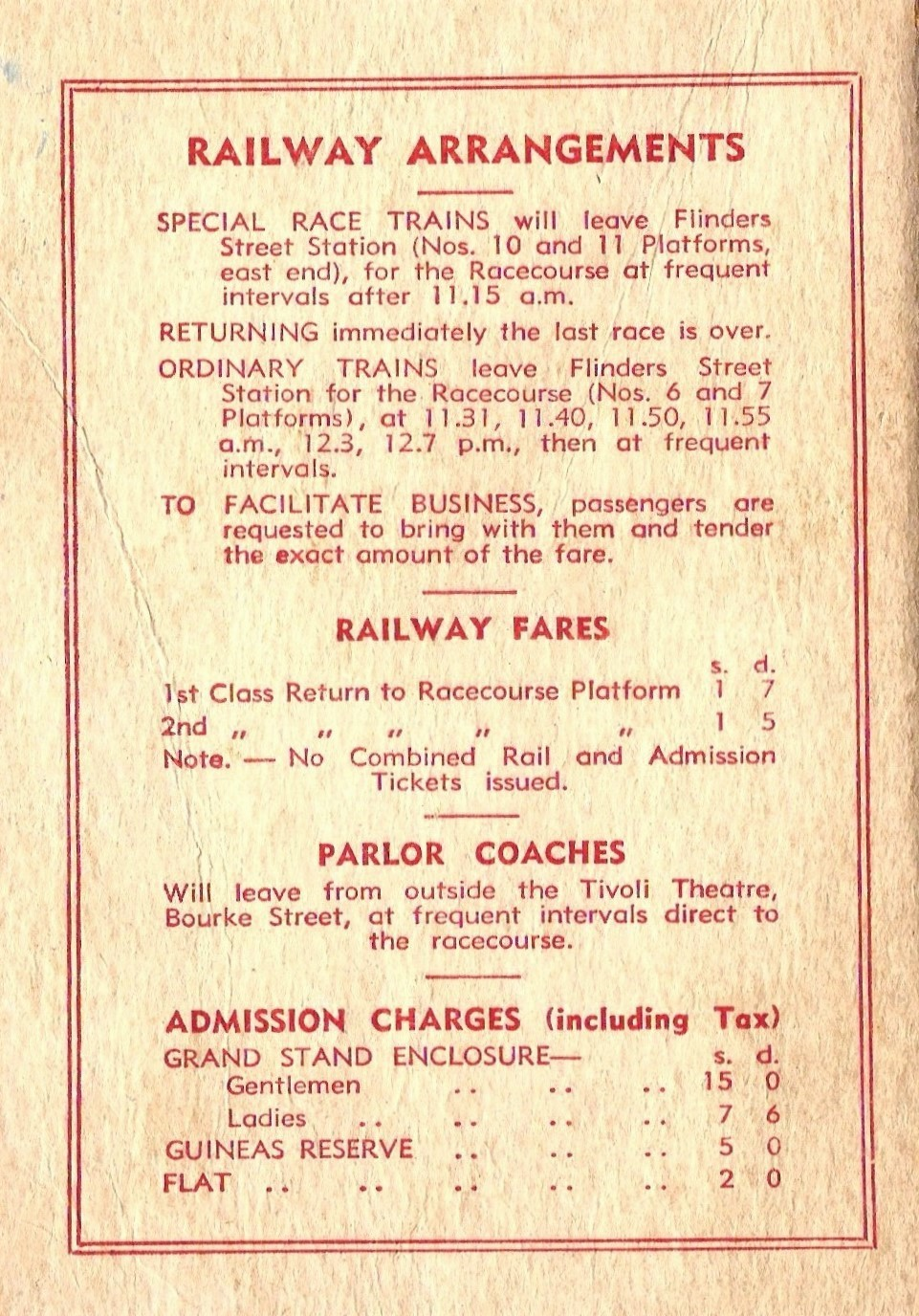
Back cover showing railway arrangements and admission charges

=== Gallery of noted winners ===
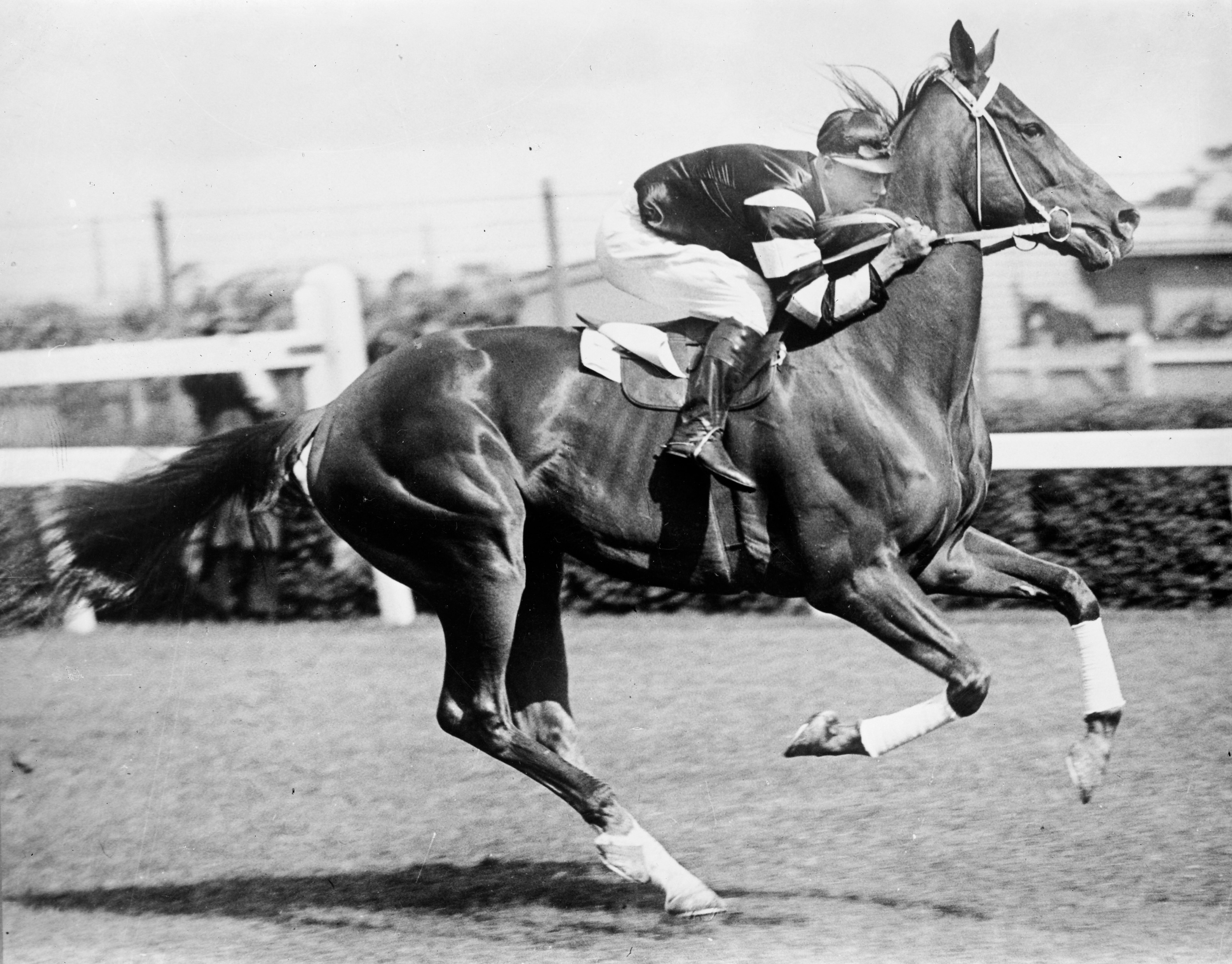
Phar Lap, 1931 winner

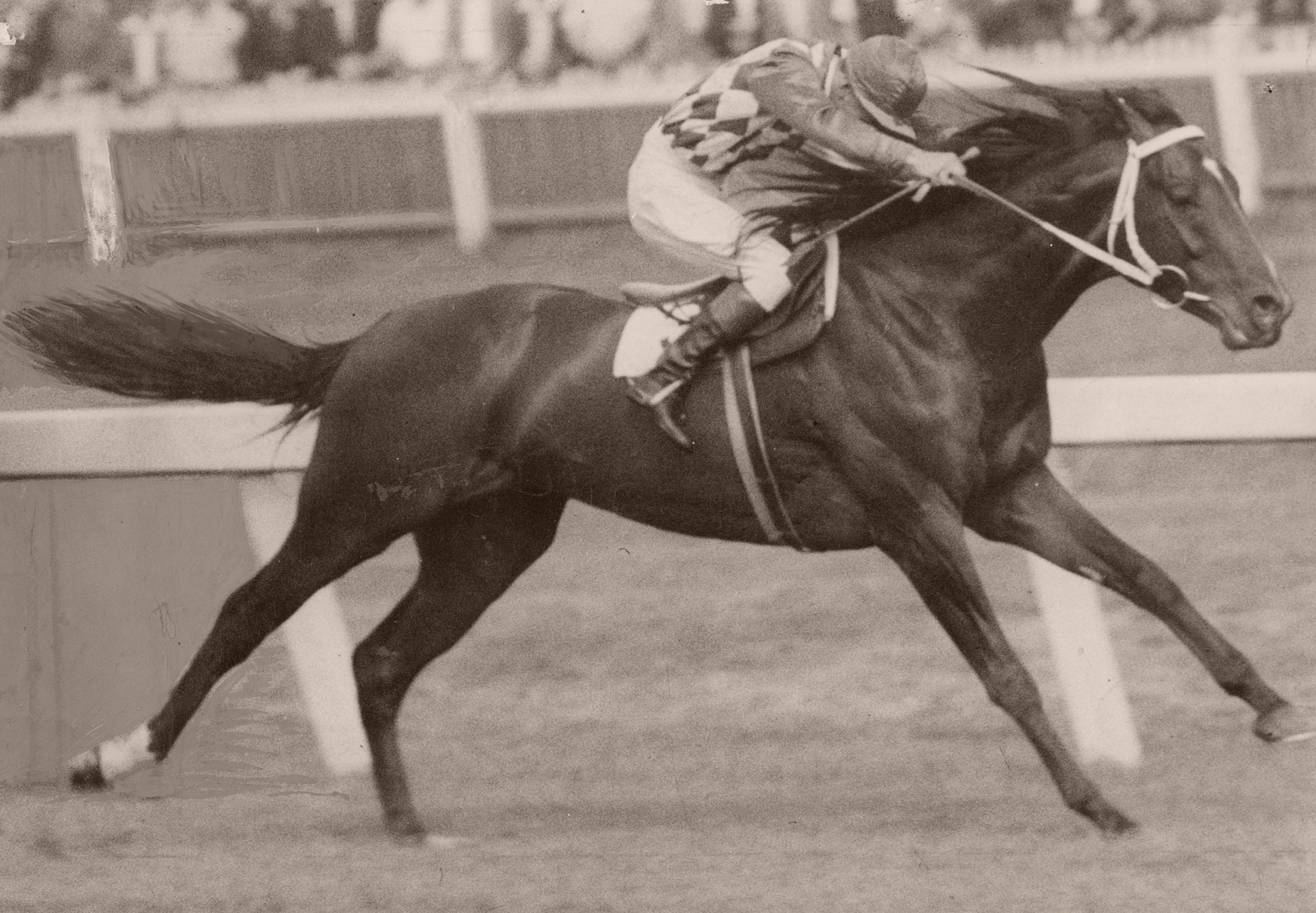
Comic Court, 1950 & 1951 winner

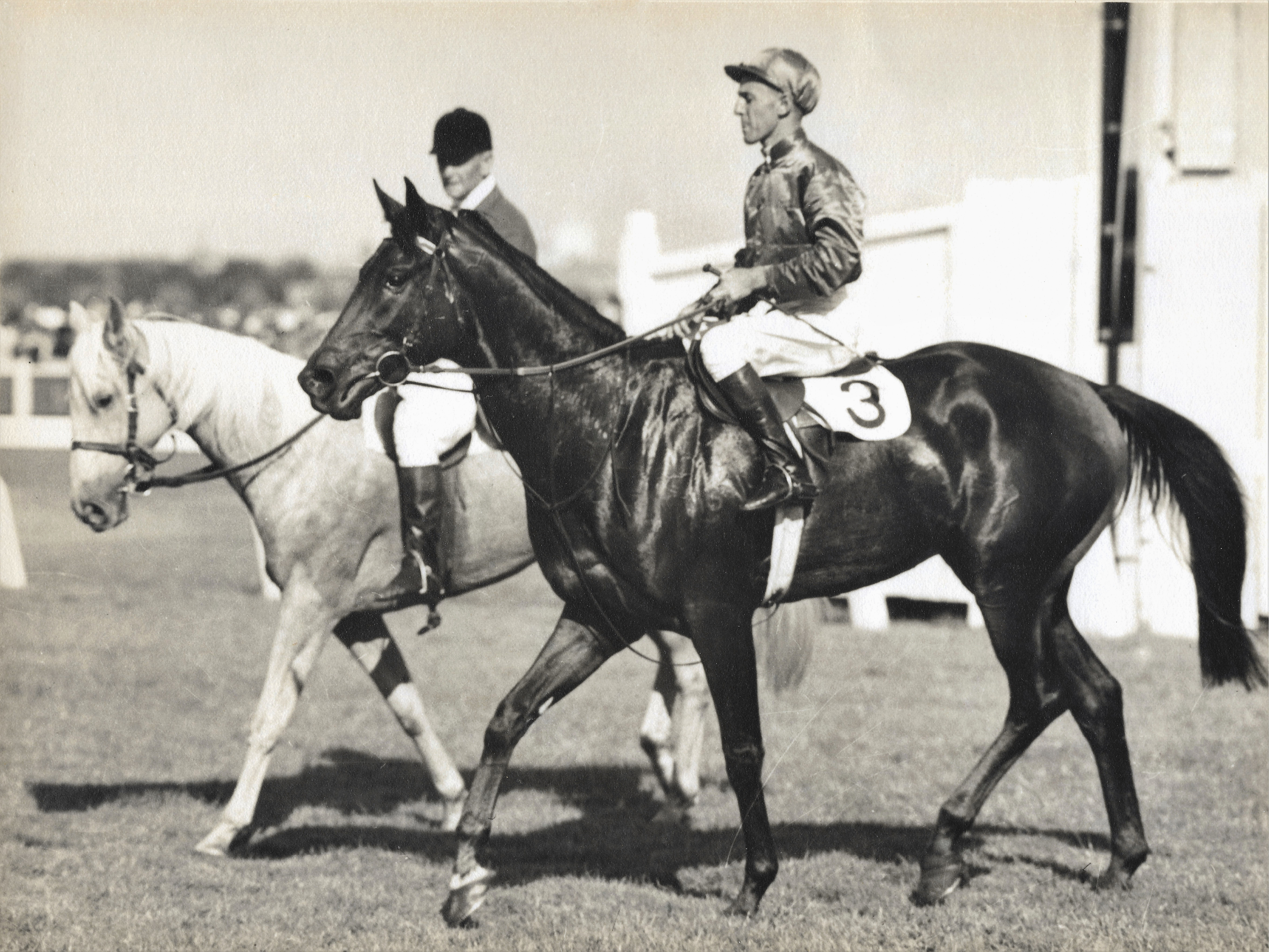
Delta,1952 winner

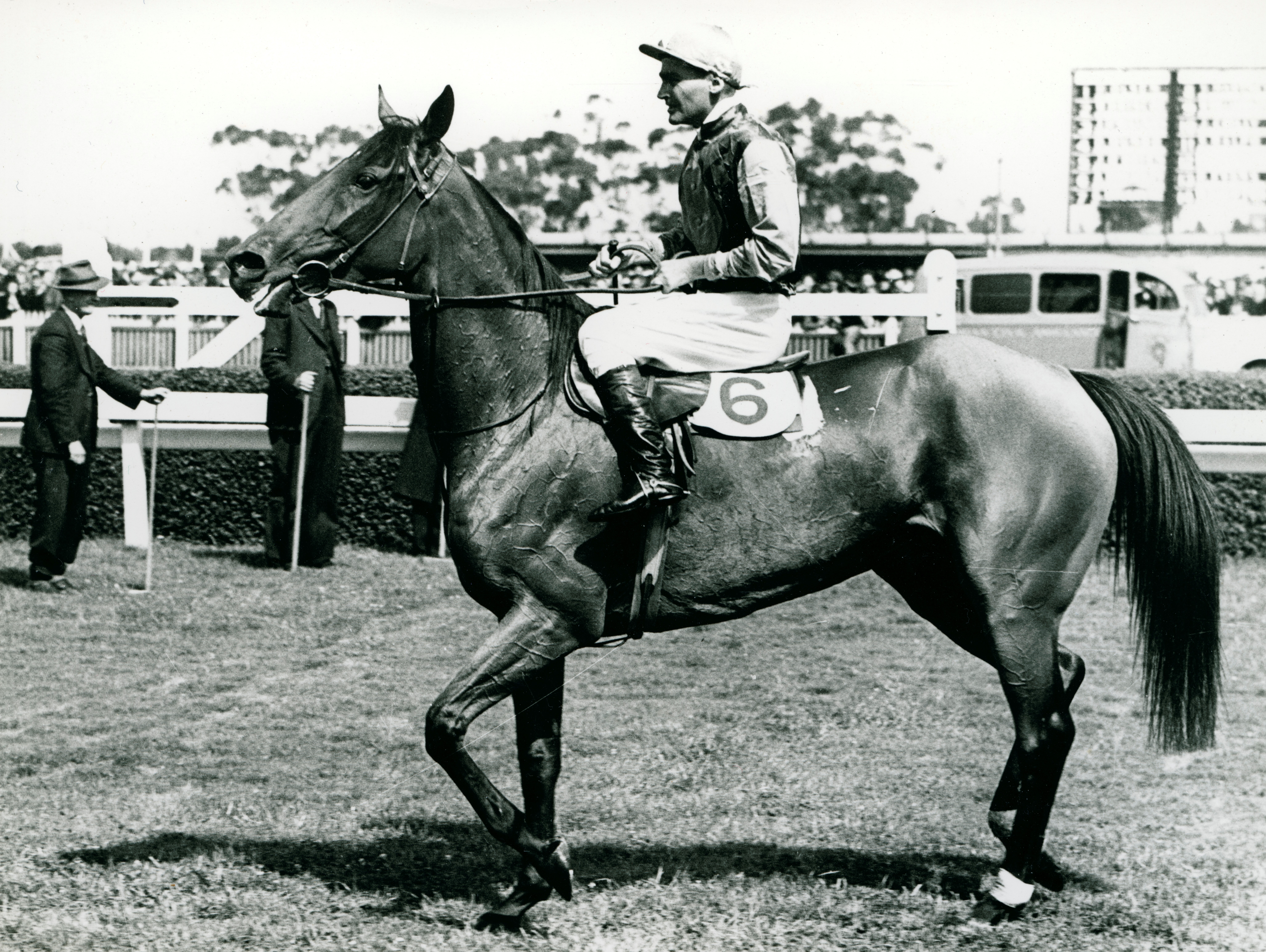
Flight, 1946 winner

== Winners ==
The following are past winners of the race.

- 2026 – Birdman
- 2025 – Pride Of Jenni
- 2024 – Campionessa
- 2023 – Steinem
- 2022 – Cascadian
- 2021 – Paradee
- 2020 – Miss Siska
- 2019 – Avilius
- 2018 – Gailo Chop
- 2017 – Stratum Star
- 2016 – Bow Creek
- 2015 – Mourinho
- 2014 – Fiorente
- 2013 – Foreteller
- 2012 – Lucas Cranach
- 2011 – Heart Of Dreams
- 2010 – La Rocket
- 2009 – Theseo
- 2008 – Princess Coup
- 2007 – Pompeii Ruler
- 2006 – Our Smoking Joe
- 2005 – Elvstroem
- 2004 – Lonhro
- 2003 – Northerly
- 2002 – Northerly
- 2001 – Cent Home
- 2000 – Royal Voyage
- 1999 – Istidaad
- 1998 – Dane Ripper
- 1997 – Istidaad
- 1996 – Racer's Edge
- 1995 – Durbridge
- 1994 – Durbridge
- 1993 – Star Of The Realm
- 1992 – Let's Elope
- 1991 – Sydeston
- 1990 – King's High
- 1989 – Vo Rogue
- 1988 – Vo Rogue
- 1987 – Foxseal
- 1986 – Mrs.Fitzherbet
- 1985 – Torbek
- 1984 – Penny Edition
- 1983 – Getting Closer
- 1982 – Lawman
- 1981 – †My Brown Jug / Hyperno
- 1980 – Minuetto
- 1979 – Quiet Snort
- 1978 – Unaware
- 1977 – Ashbah
- 1976 – Leilani
- 1975 – Leilani
- 1974 – Sobar
- 1973 – Longfella
- 1972 – Cyron
- 1971 – Gay Icarus
- 1970 – Rain Lover
- 1969 – Rain Lover
- 1968 – Winfreux
- 1967 – Tobin Bronze
- 1966 – Light Fingers
- 1965 – Yangtze
- 1964 – Sometime
- 1963 – Aquanita
- 1962 – Dhaulagiri
- 1961 – Dhaulagiri
- 1960 – Lord
- 1959 – Lord
- 1958 – Prince Darius
- 1957 – Redcraze
- 1956 – Somerset Fair
- 1955 – Flying Halo
- 1954 – Cromis
- 1953 – Hydrogen
- 1952 – Delta
- 1951 – Comic Court
- 1950 – Comic Court
- 1949 – Carbon Copy
- 1948 – Valcurl
- 1947 – Attley
- 1946 – Flight
- 1945 – Tranquil Star
- 1944 – Tranquil Star
- 1943 – Sun Valley
- 1942 – High Caste
- 1941 – Tranquil Star
- 1940 – High Caste
- 1939 – Ajax
- 1938 – Hua
- 1937 – Young Idea
- 1936 – Cuddle
- 1935 – Farndale
- 1934 – Danilo
- 1933 – Eastern Chief
- 1932 – Ammon Ra
- 1931 – Phar Lap
- 1930 – Amounis
- 1929 – Black Duchess
- 1928 – Black Duchess
- 1927 – Heroic
- 1926 – Whittier
- 1925 – The Hawk
- 1924 – The Hawk
- 1923 – Easingwold
- 1922 – Eurythmic
- 1921 – ‡race not held
- 1920 – Artilleryman
- 1919 – Mistico
- 1918 – Desert Gold
- 1917 – Patrobas
- 1916 – Cyklon
- 1915 – Land Of Song
- 1914 – Jolly Beggar
- 1913 – Cider
- 1912 – Trafalgar
- 1911 – Comedy King
- 1910 – Alawa
- 1909 – Soultline
- 1908 – Mountain King
- 1907 – Ellis
- 1906 – Lady Wallace
- 1905 – Billingsgate
- 1904 – Scottish King
- 1903 – Footbolt
- 1902 – Wakeful
- 1901 – Clean Sweep
- 1900 – Parthian

† Dead heat

‡ An embargo on Melbourne racing was in force by the Victorian Cabinet

== See also ==
- List of Australian Group races
- Group races
