= Red Handed =

New Zealand-bred Thoroughbred racehorse

Red Handed (NZ)
- Sire: Le Filou (FR)
- Grandsire: Vatellor (FR)
- Dam: Red Might (NZ)
- Damsire: Red Mars (GB)
- Sex: Horse
- Foaled: 1962
- Died: April 27, 1990 (aged 27–28)
- Country: New Zealand
- Colour: Chestnut
- Owner: F W Clarke et al.
- Trainer: Bart Cummings

Major wins
- Melbourne Cup (1967)
- Last updated on 27 December 2011

Red Handed (1962−1990) was a New-Zealand bred, Australian-trained Thoroughbred racehorse, who won the 1967 Melbourne Cup.

He was sired by the French stallion, Le Filou. His New Zealand bred dam, Red Might, was by Red Mars (GB).

The horse was purchased in New Zealand relatively cheaply by Bart Cummings for the sum of 870 guineas. This was due to the horse having a club foot and a paralysed ear (an injury incurred as a result of being kicked in the head by another horse as a yearling, paralysing the nerves down one side of his face).

In the lead up to the Melbourne Cup he placed fourth in the Mackinnon Stakes and second in the Caulfield Cup. Despite being headed in the straight by Red Crest, Red Handed fought back to win the race by a neck under hard riding from jockey Roy Higgins.
