= J. J. Miller =

Australian jockey and horse trainer

John James Miller (born 28 April 1933 in Fremantle, Western Australia) is a former champion jockey and horse trainer. Miller rode more than 2200 winners in a career which started with his first win after just six races in 1947. He rode his last race in 1988 and then went on to a successful career as a trainer. He rode winners in all Australian states as well as enjoying overseas success in England, Mauritius, Ireland and Singapore.

Miller was often controversial during his career, frequently being in dispute with racing stewards and often being banned from racing for extended periods as a result. In the mid-1960s he moved to South Australia from where he rode for leading trainers in Colin Hayes and Bart Cummings.

Miller rode in the 1965 Melbourne Cup, coming second in a photo finish. His greatest ride was in the following season however, when he won the 1966 Melbourne Cup on Gallilee, completing a "double" after winning the Caulfield Cup just previously. The next year he rode Gallilee again to win the 1967 Sydney Cup becoming the only jockey (and Gallilee being the only horse) to have ever won the "triple".

He rode winners in six Australian Derbys, and returning to Western Australia, two Perth Cups and a Railway Stakes. In the 1987 Perth Cup, his Laurie Connell owned mount Rocket Racer won the race by nine lengths in controversial circumstances.

Miller was inducted into the Western Australian Hall of Champions in 1995.

His two sons Mark and Shane as well as his wife Kay Miller are all well-known Western Australian horse racing identities. His other son Ray has had a checkered career and has been warned off by the racing authorities in Western Australia. In October 2007 Miller faced being sued by estranged son Mark over a land deal in Baldivis, Western Australia.
