= Leilani (horse) =

New Zealand-bred Thoroughbred racehorse

- Sire: Oncidium (GB)
- Grandsire: Alcide
- Dam: Lei
- Damsire: Summertime (GB)
- Sex: Mare
- Foaled: 30 September 1970
- Died: 2 May 1990 (aged 19)
- Country: New Zealand
- Colour: Brown
- Breeder: Ian MacRae
- Owner: Andrew Peacock
- Trainer: Bart Cummings
- Record: 28: 14-6-6
- Earnings: $270,870

Major wins
- AJC Oaks (1974); Caulfield Cup (1974); Toorak Handicap (1974); LKS Mackinnon Stakes (1974); Turnbull Stakes (1974); VRC Queens Cup (1974); C F Orr Stakes (1975); Australian Cup (1975); St George Stakes (1975, 1976)

Awards
- Australian Champion Racehorse of the Year (1975)

Honours
- Australian Racing Hall of Fame; Leilani Stakes (now MVRC Champagne Stakes)
- Last updated on 13 January 2010

Leilani was a champion thoroughbred racemare that was bred in New Zealand and raced in Australia. She won six Group One races and a total of 12 black type equivalent races, during her short racing career. At the time of her retirement she held the Australasian earnings record for a mare.

== Pedigree ==
Leilani was owned by The Outstanding Racehorse and sire Oncidium. Her dam was The Very Good Racemare, Lei by Summertime. Lei won 16 races and was the dam of four foals, and the three which raced were by Oncidium, making them full siblings to Leilani. These three horses were all winners, with Ready O'Ready becoming a stakes winner.

== Racing record ==
During her racing career, Leilani was part owned by prominent Australian politician Andrew Peacock.

=== At three years: 1973-74 ===
Her principal race wins included:

- 1974 AJC Oaks over 2,400 metres
- 1974 AJC Princess Handicap, 2,000 metres

=== At four years: 1974-75 ===
In 1974 Leilani started as the favourite horse and finished second in the Melbourne Cup. Her principal race wins included:

- 1974 VATC Caulfield Cup, 2,400 metres
- 1974 VATC Toorak Handicap, 1,600 metres
- 1974 VRC LKS Mackinnon Stakes, 2,000 metres
- 1974 VRC Queen's Cup, 2,500 metres
- 1974 VRC Turnbull Stakes, 2,000 metres
- 1975 VATC C F Orr Stakes, 1,400 metres
- 1975 VATC St George Stakes, 1,800 metres
- 1975 VRC Australian Cup, over 2,000 metres carrying 58.5 kilograms.
- 1975 VRC Queens Plate, 2,000 metres

=== At five years: 1975-76 ===
Leilani was injured as a five-year-old and only had six starts for a win in the 1976 VATC St George Stakes over 1,800 metres at Weight for Age (WFA) conditions.

She was inducted into the Australian Racing Hall of Fame as the 1975 Australian Champion Racehorse of the Year.

Leilani's trainer Bart Cummings named his stables 'Leilani Lodge' at Randwick Racecourse.

== Stud record ==
Leilani produced three named foals in Australia and New Zealand; however none of them won a stakes race.

- 1988 filly Skylarking (foaled in Australia) by Twig Moss (foaled in France) produced one stakeswinner.
- 1979 filly Paulownia (foaled in New Zealand) by In The Purple.
- 1978 stallion Silver Lei (foaled in NZ) by Silver Dream, stood at stud, but has not sired any stakeswinners.

Leilani died on 2 May 1990.

Leilani is Hawaiian for Heavenly Flower/Child
