= Roy Higgins (jockey) =

Australian jockey

Personal information
- Nickname: The Professor
- Born: Roy Henry Higgins; 5 June 1938 Koondrook, Victoria, Australia
- Died: 8 March 2014 (aged 75) Melbourne, Australia

Sport
- Sport: Professional jockey, media commentator
- Retired: 1983

Roy Henry Higgins MBE (5 June 1938 – 8 March 2014) was an Australian jockey who rode from the late 1950s to the early 1980s. His talent in the saddle was to later earn him the nickname "The Professor".

== Early life ==
Higgins was born in Koondrook, Victoria and grew up in the southern New South Wales town of Deniliquin where, in 1953, he was apprenticed to local horse trainer Jim Watters.

== Career ==
Despite a constant battle with his weight, Higgins won almost every major race on the Australian calendar. He rode a total of 2312 winners during his career and won the Melbourne Jockeys' Premiership a record-equalling 11 times. His first premiership win was in the 1964/65 racing season.

Higgins won the Melbourne Cup twice, on Light Fingers in 1965 and Red Handed in 1967, both for trainer Bart Cummings, one Caulfield Cup, two W. S. Cox Plates, five VRC Oaks, four Victoria Derbys, the Blue Diamond Stakes and the AJC Oaks six times. He also won two Sydney Cups and two Golden Slipper Stakes. Some of the horses he was associated with were Gunsynd, Leilani, Storm Queen, Sir Dane and Big Philou.

Higgins' last race ride was at Flemington in October 1983, after which he declared his ambition was "to be a little fat man". He continued to be employed in the racing industry as a commentator on TV and radio, particularly on Melbourne radio. He also lectured in the jockey training program at the Northern Lodge Training Centre of the Northern Melbourne Institute of TAFE.

Higgins was inducted into the Sport Australia Hall of Fame in 1987. He was an inaugural inductee into the Australian Racing Hall of Fame in 2001.

== Honours ==
In the June 1974 Queen's Birthday Honours, Higgins was made a Member of the Order of the British Empire (MBE) for services to "Horse racing as a jockey".

== Personal life ==
Higgins was married to Genine. Although they were separated they remained friends. They had two daughters.

== Death ==
Higgins died in Melbourne on 8 March 2014, aged 75, following a short illness.
