= Light Fingers =

New Zealand-bred Thoroughbred racehorse

- Sire: Le Filou
- Grandsire: Vatellor
- Dam: Cuddlesome
- Damsire: Red Mars
- Sex: Mare
- Foaled: 1961
- Died: 1988
- Country: New Zealand
- Colour: Chestnut
- Breeder: V. F. Dawson
- Owner: W. J. Broderick
- Trainer: Bart Cummings
- Record: 33-15-8-5
- Earnings: $109,370

Major wins
- VRC Oaks (1964); Wakeful Stakes (1964); Edward Manifold Stakes (1964); Sandown Guineas (1964); AJC Oaks (1965); Craiglee Stakes (1965); Melbourne Cup (1965); Sandown Cup (1966); St George Stakes (1966)

Honours
- Australian Racing Hall of Fame; Light Fingers Stakes
- Last updated on 9-23-17

Light Fingers (1961−1988) was a New Zealand bred thoroughbred racehorse who won the Melbourne Cup in 1965. In 2017 Light Fingers was inducted to the Australian Racing Hall of Fame.

== Background ==
The lightly built chestnut was by the sire of stayers, Le Filou, from Cuddlesome by Red Mars (GB) by Hyperion (GB). She was originally called Close Embrace in New Zealand, but the Australian registrar would not allow that name to be used.

Trained by Bart Cummings, Light Fingers would become the first of his 12 Melbourne Cup winners. Cummings had tried to buy the filly on a visit to New Zealand but was unsuccessful. However, he managed to lease the horse, which would carry the most significant weight to victory by a mare to that date.

== Racing career ==
Light Fingers had her first race on Boxing Day in 1963 at the Port Adelaide Racing Club's track at Cheltenham, where she ran second over 5 furlongs. She won her next three starts, two at Adelaide, and one at Flemington, before being sent for a spell. In her three-year-old year, Light Fingers won 7 races from 12 starts. That year, she won all essential fillies' races, save the One Thousand Guineas, where Reveille beat her. The mare won her first race as a four-year-old and won the Craiglee Stakes over a mile early in the spring of 1965.

The rest of Light Fingers' lead-up to the Melbourne Cup was filled with obstacles. First, she suffered a virus, and then she injured her shoulder in a near fall in the Caulfield Stakes. The injury prevented her from running in the Caulflield Cup and raised doubts about whether she would make the start of the Melbourne Cup. Her regular rider, Roy Higgins, was unsure about whether he should keep the ride but eventually chose to stick with the mare, saying, 'my filly is so good that if she gets to the post, she might just win, and if she does it will break my heart not to be on her'. Light Fingers pulled up well after her final lead up run in the Mackinnon Stakes, and following a cortisone injection by vet Percy Sykes, started in the Melbourne Cup at odds of 15/1. Fifth into the straight, Light Fingers ranged up to stablemate Ziema at the furlong. The two horses hit the line together, with the camera giving Light Fingers the victory by half a head. Higgins, who rode Light Fingers in the majority of her big wins, was quoted as saying after her Melbourne Cup victory, that as Light Fingers and her stablemate Ziema worked together leading up to the '65 Cup, Higgins felt that when the mare ranged up alongside the big striding Ziema, he seemed to take a look at her and turn it up. Higgins went on to state. "In the last few strides, however, she seemed to sense that something extra was needed. I could feel her gathering herself, and she fairly dived for the winning post. I only had to wave the whip at her. I did not want to hit her. She was giving all she had."

Following her Melbourne Cup win, Light Fingers ran second to stablemate Galilee, one of the great stayers of the decade, in that race the following year.

== Breeding career ==
Light Fingers had an unremarkable breeding career. Her foals were:

- Her Boy, a chestnut colt by Agricola, foaled in 1969
- An unnamed bay colt by Alcimedes, foaled in 1972
- Nimble Fingers, a brown filly by Alcimedes, foaled in 1973
- Slick, a bay filly by Zephyr Bay, foaled in 1977
- An unnamed bay filly by Decies, foaled in 1978
- Nimble Touch, a chestnut colt by Smuggler, foaled in 1981
- Nimble Princess, a bay filly by Princes Gate, foaled in 1984
