= Tobin Bronze =

Thoroughbred racehorse

- Sire: Arctic Explorer
- Grandsire: Arctic Prince
- Dam: Amarco
- Damsire: Masthead
- Sex: Stallion
- Foaled: 1962
- Country: Australia
- Colour: Chestnut
- Breeder: W. Brown & Sons Pty. Ltd.
- Owner: 1) Alfred, Donald C. & Walter E. Brown; 2) William Breliant & Irving Litz
- Trainer: 1) H.G. (Graham) Heagney; 2) Charles E. Whittingham (USA)
- Record: 60: 28-10-6
- Earnings: A£89,586

Major wins
- Bloodhorse Breeders' Stakes (1965); Victoria Derby (1965); Blamey Stakes (1966, 1967); Craiglee Stakes (1966); J J Liston Stakes (1966); Underwood Stakes (1966); Turnbull Stakes (1966); W S Cox Plate (1966, 1967); L.K.S. MacKinnon Stakes (1966); C F Orr Stakes (1967); St George Stakes (1967); All Aged Stakes (1967); Doncaster Handicap (1967); Toorak Handicap (1967); Caulfield Cup (1967); Azucar Purse (1968)

Honours
- Australian Racing Hall of Fame (2003)
- Last updated on 12 April 2010

Tobin Bronze (1962–1994) was an Australian Thoroughbred Hall of Fame racehorse who competed with great success during the 1960s.

A chestnut son of Arctic Explorer from the Masthead mare Amarco, he was a crowd favourite and won 24 of his 44 Australian race starts. His record in weight for age races was 16 starts for 12 wins, 3 seconds and 1 third.

He also won many races under handicap conditions, such as the 1967 VATC Caulfield Cup while carrying 9 stone 10 pounds (62 kg) and the AJC Doncaster Handicap under 9 stone 5 pounds (59 kg). In addition, he won the 1967 VATC Toorak Handicap with 9 stone 12 pounds (63 kg), a weight-carrying record for this event that still stands. A 20 October 2009 Sydney Morning Herald article ranked Tobin Bronze's win in the 1966 Cox Plate as one of the "Top 5 Cox Plate moments".

Only the champion stayer Redcraze has ever carried more weight to victory in a Caulfield Cup.

After three seasons in Australia, Tobin Bronze was sold to American interests but not before winning his final race start in Australia, the 1967 W.S. Cox Plate, before a huge crowd.

He was moderately successful overseas, where he won a further four times from 16 starts. However, he failed to properly adapt to the dirt tracks used in America. Racing in the United States for the first time, Tobin Bronze finished third in the Washington, D.C. International Stakes. Sent to California to race in 1968, on 2 March Tobin Bronze won in his third start in the United States, capturing the Azucar Purse at Hollywood Park Racetrack.

At stud, Tobin Bronze was the sire of fifteen stakes race winners including Trojan Bronze, the 1975 San Luis Rey Handicap winner, and Noble Bronze, who won the 1978 California Derby.

Tobin Bronze died in California in 1994. Following its formation in 2000, he was inducted into the Australian Racing Hall of Fame in 2003.
