= 1980 Melbourne Cup =

Edition of the Melbourne Cup

- Melbourne Cup
- Location: Flemington Racecourse
- Date: 4 Nov 1980
- Distance: 3200m
- Winning horse: Beldale Ball
- Winning time: 3:19.8
- Final odds: 11/1
- Jockey: John Letts
- Trainer: Colin Hayes
- Owner: Robert Sangster
- Surface: Turf

Letts riding for dear life, Love Bandit second, Arwon the outside, Hyperno in a pocket and then came My Blue Denim with a fast run. But Beldale Ball's got the Melbourne Cup won, My Blue Denim coming from the clouds into second place. Beldale Ball stopping to a walk but he's gonna win. Beladale Ball, Jonny Letts! Beats My Blue Denim, Love Bandit third.

— Commentator Bill Collins describes the climax of the race.

The 1980 Melbourne Cup was a handicap horse race which took place on Tuesday, 4 November 1980 over 3200m, at Flemington Racecourse.

The race was won by the American bred gelding Beldale Ball, trained by Colin Hayes and ridden by John Letts. The runner up was My Blue Denim, trained by Dave O'Sullivan, and third place went to Love Bandit trained by Bob Hoysted.

== Background ==
The pre-race favourites were the Bart Cummings gelding Hyperno who won the 1979 Melbourne Cup and the 1980 Cox Plate winner Kingston Town, however the latter was scratched after suffering a suspensory ligament injury.

The first 1600m was rather slowly run in 1:41.3. Before the half-way mark John Letts took Beldale Ball to the lead and heading into the straight he put three lengths on the field. My Blue Denim was near the tale of the field at the turn but flashed home for 2nd. The winning margin was a length and a half. Love Bandit who had led earlier and stayed handy to the pace held on for third. The veteran New Zealand stayer Magistrate finished strongly for 4th. The favourite Hyperno finished seventh after a luckless run.

Beldale Ball was sired in the United States and purchased by Robert Sangster as a two year old. He was raced in England as a 2 and 3 year old for mixed results although his two wins were over 2800m hinting at his stamina. Sangster imported him to Australia and placed him with Colin Hayes. Prior to the Melbourne Cup he was 2nd by a neck to Mr Independent in the Herbert Power Handicap (2400m) and 2nd to stablemate Bohemian Grove in The Dalgety (2500m).

It was the first Melbourne Cup win for trainer Colin Hayes and perhaps some consolation for losing Dulcify during the previous year's cup. Dulcify had suffered a broken pelvis during the race and had to be euthanized. Hayes also won the 1986 Melbourne Cup with At Talaq.

For John Letts it was his second victory in the race, having won on the Tasmanian gelding Piping Lane in the 1972 Melbourne Cup.

The 2nd placed My Blue Denim, known as Blue Denim in New Zealand where he was trained by Dave O'Sullivan, had won the 1980 Auckland Cup over 3200m on New Year's Day. Blue Denim's jockey Peter Cook would taste victory in the 1981 Melbourne Cup on Just a Dash for Tommy J. Smith and the 1984 Melbourne Cup on Black Knight for George Hanlon.

== Field ==
The following are the placegetters in the 1980 Melbourne Cup.

Number	Place	Horse	Weight (kg)	Trainer	Jockey
1	Scratched	Kingston Town	59.5	T J Smith	
2	7th	Hyperno	58.5	Bart Cummings	Harry White
3	17th	Ming Dynasty	58	Bart Cummings	Midge Didham
4	21st	Bohemian Grove (USA)	57	Colin Hayes	R Mallyon
5	9th	Arwon (NZ)	55	George Hanlon	J Miller
6	11th	Yashmark	55	Colin Hayes	Brent Thomson
7	PU	Big Print (NZ)	55	A R White	P Jarman
8	2nd	My Blue Denim (NZ)	53.5	Dave O'Sullivan	Peter Cook
9	16th	Our Epilogue (NZ)	53.5	G L Warwick	Bob Skelton
10	12th	Miss Judena (NZ)	51.5	P G Hollinshead	M Campbell
11	14th	Waitangirua (NZ)	51.5	T L Millard	Pat Hyland
12	18th	Barry Stuart (NZ)	51	W E Reading	R Vance
13	5th	Brava Jeannie (NZ)	51	G T Murphy	Mick Goreham
14	3rd	Love Bandit	51	Bob Hoysted	Wayne Treloar
15	1st	Beldale Ball (USA)	49.5	Colin Hayes	John Letts
16	13th	Star Dynasty	49.5	N C Begg	Ron Quinton
17	4th	Magistrate (NZ)	49	H Steffert	Gary Willetts
18	20th	Marlborough (NZ)	49	George Hanlon	R Heffernan
19	15th	Evander (NZ)	48.5	M T Sullivan	G Murphy
20	10th	Gay Tribo (NZ)	48.5	Colin Hayes	M Riley (A)
21	19th	Summer Fleur (NZ)	48.5	G T Murphy	B Clements (A)
22	6th	La Zap (NZ)	48	Bart Cummings	John Marshall
23	8th	Reckon I'm Ready	48	T J Smith	Malcolm Johnston
24	Scratched	Al's Gamble (NZ)	47.5	W H Walters	G Doughty
