= 1981 Melbourne Cup =

Edition of the Melbourne Cup

- Melbourne Cup
- Location: Flemington Racecourse
- Date: 3 Nov 1981
- Distance: 3200m
- Winning horse: Just a Dash
- Winning time: 3:21.20
- Final odds: 15/1
- Jockey: Peter Cook
- Trainer: Tommy J. Smith
- Owner: Lloyd Williams, George Grew and Tom Pettiona
- Surface: Turf

The 1981 Melbourne Cup was a handicap horse race which took place on Tuesday, 3 November 1981 over 3200m, at Flemington Racecourse.

== Background ==
The race was won by the Australian bred gelding Just a Dash, trained by the legendary trainer Tommy Smith (also known as T. J. Smith) and ridden by Peter Cook. The runner up was El Laurena, trained by G F Burns, and third place went to Flashing Light trained by Tommy Hughes. The winning margin was two and a quarter lengths with a further length and a quarter to third place.

Just a Dash was spotted by Tommy Smith racing in the Riverina district in New South Wales. He went on to win the 1981 SAJC Adelaide Cup (3200m) and the SAJC St. Leger Stakes. Prior to the Cup he had placed 6th in the Caulfield Cup and 5th in the Dalgety Handicap.

It was the second Melbourne Cup victory for Tommy Smith and it had been a long wait between wins in the great race for him. Smith's previous success was the New Zealand bred stayer, Toparoa, in the 1955 Melbourne Cup. In between the two wins the best he had managed was Gunsynd's 3rd to Piping Lane in the 1972 Cup.

It was the first Melbourne Cup win for Peter Cook, following his 2nd in the previous year's event with Blue Denim. Cook was the son of Billy Cook who had ridden the winners of the 1941 Melbourne Cup (Skipton) and 1945 Melbourne Cup (Rainbird). Peter went on to win the 1984 Melbourne Cup on Black Knight for George Hanlon.

The 3rd placed Flashing Light had won the Herbert Power Handicap (2400m) and placed 5th in the Caulfield Cup.

The champion Kingston Town could only finish 20th.

== Field ==
The following are the placegetters in the 1981 Melbourne Cup.

Number	Place	Horse	Weight (kg)	Trainer	Jockey
1	20th	Kingston Town	60.5	Tommy J. Smith	Malcolm Johnston
2	6th	Hyperno	58	Bart Cummings	Larry Olsen
3	4th	Our Paddy Boy (NZ)	57	Colin Hayes	Brent Thomson
4	7th	Belmura Lad (NZ)	55	Bart Cummings	Midge Didham
5	10th	Koiro Trelay (NZ)	54.5	E Temperton	P Smith
6	5th	Arwon (NZ)	54	George Hanlon	B Clements
7	1st	Just a Dash	53.5	Tommy J. Smith	Peter Cook
8	9th	Mr Cromwell (NZ)	53	J J Atkins	M Pelling
9	2nd	El Laurena	52	G F Burns	G Killen
10	18th	Bright Halo (NZ)	51	Theo Green	Ron Quinton
11	14th	Deck The Halls	51	R J McGuiness	Mick Dittman
12	8th	No Peer (NZ)	51	Bart Cummings	Harry White
13	15th	Anzaas (NZ)	50.5	I D Hay	M Baker
14	19th	Lord Warden (NZ)	50	H H Riley	Gary Willetts
15	21st	Pelican Point	50	H R Wehlow	John Letts
16	13th	Magistrate (NZ)	49.5	I H Steffert	Bob Skelton
17	16th	Red Gun	49.5	A A Armansco	M Riley (A)
18	11th	Sepol	49.5	A Lopes	N Barrett
19	3rd	Flashing Light	49	Tommy Hughes	A Cooper
20	22nd	Cocked Hat	48	K M Kearney	R Heffernan
21	12th	Diatric	46.5	T J Harrison	G Doughty
22	17th	Favoloso	46	J U Poletti	D Short
