= List of Cox Plate winners =

The W. S. Cox Plate is an Australian Group One (G1), Weight for Age Thoroughbred horse race. The Moonee Valley Racing Club conducts the race, which is staged for three-year-olds and up.

- The race distance from 1922 to 1942 was 9½ furlongs.
- The race distance from 1943 to 1971 was 10 furlongs.
- Following Australia's adoption of the Metric system in 1972 the race distance became 2,000 metres.
- In 1974 the distance was changed to 2,050 metres and in 1986 to today's distance of 2,040 metres.

Year	Winner	Age	Breeding	Jockey	Trainer	Time	Odds
2026	Cosmic Crusader	6 b g	Maurice - Cosmic Storm	William Pike	Andrea Leek	2:03.30	8-1
2025	Via Sistina	8 b m	Fastnet Rock - Nigh	James McDonald	Chris Waller	2:05.03	5-4F
2024	Via Sistina	7 b m	Fastnet Rock - Nigh	James McDonald	Chris Waller	2:01.07	4-1
2023	Romantic Warrior	6 b g	Acclamation - Folk Melody	James McDonald	Danny Shum	2:03.16	5-2F
2022	Anamoe	4 b h	Street Boss - Anamato	James McDonald	James Cummings	2:10.17	7-5F
2021	State Of Rest	4 b h	Starspangledbanner - Repose	John Allen	Joseph O'Brien	2:06.97	13-2
2020	Sir Dragonet	4 b h	Camelot - Sparrow	Glen Boss	Ciaron Maher & David Eustace	2:08.46	13-2
2019	Lys Gracieux	6 b m	Heart's Cry - Lilliside	Damian Lane	Yoshito Yahagi	2:04.21	5-2F
2018	Winx	7 b m	Street Cry - Vegas Showgirl	Hugh Bowman	Chris Waller	2:03.47	1-5F
2017	Winx	6 b m	Street Cry - Vegas Showgirl	Hugh Bowman	Chris Waller	2:02.94	1-10F
2016	Winx	5 b m	Street Cry - Vegas Showgirl	Hugh Bowman	Chris Waller	2:06.35	7-10F
2015	Winx	4 b m	Street Cry - Vegas Showgirl	Hugh Bowman	Chris Waller	2:02.98	9-2F
2014	Adelaide	4 b h	Galileo - Elletelle	Ryan Moore	Aidan O'Brien	2:03.76	7-1
2013	Shamus Award	3 b c	Snitzel – Sunset Express	Chad Schofield	Danny O'Brien	2:05.27	20-1
2012	Ocean Park	4 b h	Thorn Park – Sayyida	Glen Boss	Gary Hennessy	2:04.14	5-1
2011	Pinker Pinker	4 b m	Reset – Miss Marion	Craig Williams	Greg Eurell	2:05.39	25-1
2010	So You Think	4 b h	High Chaparral – Triassic	Steve Arnold	Bart Cummings	2:07.45	1-2F
2009	So You Think	3 b c	High Chaparral – Triassic	Glen Boss	Bart Cummings	2:03.98	12-1
2008	Maldivian	6 b g	Zabeel – Shynzi	Michael Rodd	Mark Kavanagh	2:06.92	10-1
2007	El Segundo	6 b g	Pins – Palos Verdes	Luke Nolen	Colin Little	2:06.33	6-1
2006	Fields Of Omagh	9 b g	Rubiton – Finneto	Craig Williams	David Hayes	2:06.89	18-1
2005	Makybe Diva	7 b m	Desert King – Tugela	Glen Boss	Lee Freedman	2:09.27	1-1F
2004	Savabeel	3 br c	Zabeel – Savannah Success	Chris Munce	Graeme Rogerson	2:06.88	14-1
2003	Fields Of Omagh	6 b g	Rubiton – Finneto	Steven King	Tony McEvoy	2:07.61	16-1
2002	Northerly	6 b g	Serheed – North Bell	Patrick Payne	Fred Kersley	2:06.27	3-1 EF
2001	Northerly	5 b g	Serheed – North Bell	Damien Oliver	Fred Kersley	2:05.84	5-2
2000	Sunline	5 b m	Desert Sun – Songline	Greg Childs	Trevor McKee	2:07.70	11-8F
1999	Sunline	4 b m	Desert Sun – Songline	Greg Childs	Trevor McKee	2:05.40	6-1
1998	Might and Power	5 b/br g	Zabeel – Benediction	Jim Cassidy	Jack Denham	2:03.54	8-11F
1997	Dane Ripper	4 b m	Danehill – Red Express	Damien Oliver	Bart Cummings	2:07.65	40-1
1996	Saintly	4 ch g	Sky Chase – All Grace	Darren Beadman	Bart Cummings	2:05.73	5-1
1995	Octagonal	3 br c	Zabeel – Eight Carat	Shane Dye	John Hawkes	2:06.38	15-2
1994	Solvit	6 b g	Morcon – Yallah Sun	David Walsh	Moira Murdoch	2:02.6	10-1
1993	The Phantom Chance	4 ch g	Noble Bijou – The Fantasy	Robert Vance	Colin Jillings	2:02.8	4-1
1992	Super Impose	8 ch g	Imposing – Pheroz Fancy	Greg Hall	Lee Freedman	2:05.5	16-1
1991	Surfers Paradise	4 br g	Crested Wave – Lady Aythorpe	Lance O'Sullivan	Dave O'Sullivan	2:03.8	14-1
1990	Better Loosen Up	5 b c	Loosen Up – Better Fantasy	Michael Clarke	David Hayes	2:01.5	2-1F
1989	Almaarad	6 ch c	Ela-Mana-Mou – Silk Blend	Michael Clarke	Colin Hayes	2:03.2	11-4F
1988	Our Poetic Prince	4 br h	Yeats – Finisterre	Noel Harris	John Wheeler	2:06.9	5-4F
1987	Rubiton	4 br h	Century – Ruby	Harry White	P C Barns	2:02.9	7-4F
1986	Bonecrusher	4 ch g	Pag Asa – Imitation	Gary Stewart	Frank T Ritchie	2:07.2	9-10F
1985	Rising Prince	5 ch h	Round Top – Bonlene	Kevin Langby	Ms D Stein	2:05.3	7-1
1984	Red Anchor	3 ch c	Sea Anchor – Decoy Girl	Mick Dittman	T J Smith	2:03.7	8-11F
1983	Strawberry Road	4 b h	Whiskey Road – Giftisa	Mick Dittman	Doug Bougoure	2:09.1	11-2
1982	Kingston Town	6 bl g	Bletchingly – Ada Hunter	Peter Cook	T J Smith	2:05.5	7-4F
1981	Kingston Town	5 bl g	Bletchingly – Ada Hunter	Ron Quinton	T J Smith	2:06.7	4-6F
1980	Kingston Town	4 bl g	Bletchingly – Ada Hunter	Malcolm Johnston	T J Smith	2:07.3	6-4F
1979	Dulcify	4 b h	Decies – Sweet Candy	Brent Thomson	Colin Hayes	2:04.9	7-4F
1978	So Called	4 b h	Sobig – Calling	Brent Thomson	Colin Hayes	2:08.7	5-1
1977	Family of Man	4 b h	Lots of Man – Colleen	Brent Thomson	George Hanlon	2:05.3	10-1
1976	Surround	3 gr f	Sovereign Edition – Micheline	Peter Cook	Geoff T. Murphy	2:04.3	6-1
1975	Fury's Order	5 ch h	Indian Order – Our Fury	Brent Thomson	Wally McEwan	2:20.4	7-1
1974	Battle Heights	7 br g	Battle-Waggon – Wuthering Heights	Gary Willetts	Tim Douglas	2:09.9	7-1
1973	Taj Rossi	3 b c	Matrice – Dark Queen	Stan Aitken	Bart Cummings	2:08.3	7-1
1972	Gunsynd	5 gr h	Sunset Hue – Woodie Wonder	Roy Higgins	T J Smith	2:01.9	6-4F
1971	Tauto	6 b/br g	Good Brandy – San Patricia	Len Hill	Bob Agnew	2:03.9	12-1
1970	Abdul	3 gr c	Sovereign Edition – Fyfe	Paul Jarman	Geoff T. Murphy	2:05.5	33-1
1969	Daryl's Joy	3 br c	Stunning – Rutha	William Skelton	Syd Brown	2:05.4	6-1
1968	Rajah Sahib	3 br c	Pakistan II – Gay Princess	George Moore	T Hill	2:04.8	7-4F
1967	Tobin Bronze	5 ch h	Arctic Explorer – Amarco	Jim Johnson	Graeme H. Heagney	2:04.8	1-6F
1966	Tobin Bronze	4 ch h	Arctic Explorer – Amarco	Jim Johnson	Graeme H. Heagney	2:07.2	9-10F
1965	Star Affair	3 ch c	Star Kingdom – Royal Lark	Pat Hyland	Angus Armanasco	2:02.0	3-1
1964	Sir Dane	4 br h	Summertime – Cas	Roy Higgins	R J Shaw	2:03.9	11-2
1963	Summer Regent	5 br g	Summertime – Mayina	J Riordan	R T Cotter	2:06.2	10-1
1962	Aquanita	6 b/br h	Wateringbury – Reinita	Frank Moore	R J Shaw	2:04.3	4-5F
1961	Dhaulagiri	5 b g	High Peak – Solar Circle	G Lane	B Courtney	2:04.8	9-2
1960	Tulloch	6 b h	Khorassan – Florida	Neville Sellwood	T J Smith	2:01.1	2-1F
1959	Noholme	3 ch c	Star Kingdom – Oceana	Neville Sellwood	Maurice McCarten	2:02.7	4-1
1958	Yeman	6 ch g	Sabaean – Wardress	L Whittle	H Wiggins	2:16.4	33-1
1957	Redcraze	7 ch g	Red Mars – Myarion	George Moore	T J Smith	2:05.6	4-1
1956	Ray Ribbon	5 b c	Perilous – Lady Yelverton	Jack Purtell	G S Barr	2:04.9	4-1
1955	Kingster	3 br c	Star Kingdom – Canvas Back	W Camer	J Green	2:04.4	33-1
1954	Rising Fast	5 b/br g	Alonzo – Faster	Jack Purtell	Ivan Tucker	2:03.8	11-8F
1953	Hydrogen	5 br h	Delville Wood – Sweet Sound	Bill Williamson	E Hush	2:05.25	3-1
1952	Hydrogen	4 br h	Delville Wood – Sweet Sound	Darby Munro	E Hush	2:04.5	11-8F
1951	Bronton	3 ch c	Helios – Battle Royal	Jack Purtell	R Sinclair	2:05.5	25-1
1950	Alister	3 ch c	Whirlaway – New Flower	Jack Purtell	H Wolters	2:06.25	4-1
1949	Delta	3 br c	Midstream – Gazza	Neville Sellwood	Maurice McCarten	2:04.75	20-1
1948	Carbon Copy	3 ch c	Helios – Havers	Harold Badger	D McCormick	2:04.25	5-1
1947	Chanak	3 b c	Hellespont – Studio	Harold Badger	Jack Holt	2:05.0	9-2
1946	Flight	6 b m	Royal Step – Lambent	J O'Sullivan	Frank Nowland	2:05.0	3-1
1946	Leonard	4 ch h	Dhoti – Jeanne Hachette	W Briscoe	Lou Robertson	2:06.0	50-1
1945	Flight	5 b m	Royal Step – Lambent	J O'Sullivan	Frank Nowland	2:08.75	11-2
1944	Tranquil Star	7 ch m	Gay Lothario – Lone Star	Scobie Breasley	R Cameron	2:06.75	7-1
1943	Amana	4 ch h	Talking – Capris	A Dewhirst	R J Shaw	2:03.75	5-2F
1942	Tranquil Star	5 ch m	Gay Lothario – Lone Star	K Smith	R Cameron	2:00.75	6-1
1941	Beau Vite	5 br h	Beau Pere – Dominant	Darby Munro	Frank McGrath, Sr.	1:58.25	1-3F
1940	Beau Vite	4 br h	Beau Pere – Dominant	E McMenamin	Frank McGrath, Sr.	1:57.75	7-4F
1939	Mosaic	4 br h	Posterity – Inlaid	Darby Munro	J H Abbs	1:56.5	50-1
1938	Ajax	6 ch h	Heroic – Medmenham	Harold Badger	F Musgrave	1:56.75	1-2F
1937	Young Idea	5 br h	Constant Son – Persuasion	Darby Munro	Jack Holt	1:58.5	2-1F
1936	Young Idea	4 br h	Constant Son – Persuasion	H Skidmore	Jack Holt	2:01.0	4-1
1935	Garrio	3 b c	Chivalrous – Garrulity	K Voitre	Lou Robertson	1:58.5	14-1
1934	Chatham	6 b h	Windbag – Myosotis	S Davidson	Fred Williams	2:03.0	2-1F
1933	Rogilla	6 ch g	Roger de Busli – Speargila	Darby Munro	Les Haigh	1:58.5	10-1
1932	Chatham	4 b h	Windbag – Myosotis	James Munro	Fred Williams	2:02.75	10-9F
1931	Phar Lap	5 ch g	Night Raid – Entreaty	James Pike	Harry Telford	2:01.5	1-14F
1930	Phar Lap	4 ch g	Night Raid – Entreaty	James Pike	Harry Telford	1:59.25	1-7F
1929	Nightmarch	4 br c	Night Raid – Marsa	Roy Reed	A McAulay	2:01.5	5-4F
1928	Highland	7 b/br g	Highfield – Regulator	W Duncan	Jack Holt	2:06.75	9-2
1927	Amounis	5 br g	Magpie – Loved One	J Toohey	Frank McGrath, Sr.	2:00.5	3-1EF
1926	Heroic	5 ch h	Valais – Chersonese	H Cairns	Jack Holt	1:58.0	4-5F
1925	Manfred	3 b c	Valais – Otford	F Dempsey	H McCalman	1:57.0	4-5F
1924	The Night Patrol	6 b h	Stedfast – Dark Flight	G Young	James Scobie	1:59.2	6-1
1923	Easingwold	5 ch h	Eaton Lad – Bahloo	G Harrison	Jack Holt	1:57.25	6-4F
1922	Violoncello	6 ch h	Valens – Catgut	J King	C H Bryans	1:57.5	2-1

- † The 1946 Cox Plate was run in two divisions.

== See also ==
- W. S. Cox Plate
- Australian horse-racing
- Melbourne Spring Racing Carnival
