= 1982 Melbourne Cup =

Edition of the Melbourne Cup

- Melbourne Cup
- Location: Flemington Racecourse
- Date: 2 November 1982
- Distance: 3200 metres
- Winning horse: Gurner's Lane
- Winning time: 3:21.1
- Final odds: 8/1
- Jockey: Mick Dittman
- Trainer: Geoff Murphy
- Surface: Turf

Kingston Town in front at the 200 a length to Noble Comment, Gurner's Lane getting a split now! Kingston Town in front, Gurner's Lane flying on the inside he's coming home like a train! Kingston Town joined by Gurner's Lane and Gurner's Lane gets up to win the Cup! A neck to Kingston Town.

— Commentator Bill Collins describes the climax of the race

The 1982 Melbourne Cup was a two-mile handicap horse race which took place on Tuesday, 2 November 1982 at Flemington Racecourse.

The race was won by Gurner's Lane trained by Geoff Murphy and ridden by Mick Dittman. He won by a neck from Kingston Town trained by Tommy Smith and 3rd was Noble Comment trained by George Hanlon.

== Background ==
Fellow Tommy Smith trained Just A Dash was sent out the 11/2 favourite.

Gurner's Lane had won the 1982 AJC and the VRC St Leger Stakes, ran third in the Metropolitan Handicap and then won the Caulfield Cup and incurred a 3 kg penalty for the cup. His impressive run of race victories saw him awarded the Australian Horse of the Year for the 1982–1983 season. Gurner's Lane broke down in early 1983 and although later returning to the track he never won another race.

The race is remembered for the defeat of champion Kingston Town who had won his third Cox Plate the start before. His jockey, Malcolm Johnston, was later criticised for taking him to the lead too early. Kingston Town went to Perth and broke down after winning what would be his last race, now named the Kingston Town Classic.

== Field ==
This is a list of horses which ran in the 1982 Melbourne Cup.

Place	Horse	Trainer	Jockey
1st	Gurner's Lane	Geoff Murphy	Mick Dittman
2nd	Kingston Town	Tommy Smith	Malcolm Johnston
3rd	Noble Comment	George Hanlon	Robert Heffernan
4th	My Sir Avon	Bart Cummings	Harry White
5th	Bianco Lady	R H Thomsen	N Voigt
6th	Port Carling	Tommy Smith	Ron Quinton
7th	Allez Bijou	C J Honeychurch	Gary Willetts
8th	Wellington Road	P Dawson	G Cook
9th	Astrolin	Wayne Walters	P Alderman
10th	Amarant	George Hanlon	Jim Cassidy
11th	Silver Bounty	G M Carson	Midge Didham
12th	Dealer's Choice	R B Morgan	C Bromley
13th	Barmax	L M Armfield	D Coleman
14th	Tohar	Rick Hore-Lacy	P Shepherd
15th	Triumphal March	Colin Hayes	Brent Thomson
16th	Just A Dash	Tommy Smith	Peter Cook
17th	Magistrate	Ian Steffert	Brian Andrews
18th	Dry Wine	J V Burns	B McGinley
19th	Carringbush	Ray Hutchins	Pat Hyland
20th	Rose And Thistle	Errol Skelton	Bob Skelton
21st	Mr. Digby	Tommy Hughes	G Murphy
22nd	Brewery Boy	Tommy Smith	John Letts
23rd	Gala Mascot	Geoff Murphy	B Clements
