= 1984 Melbourne Cup =

Edition of the Melbourne Cup

- Melbourne Cup
- Location: Flemington Racecourse
- Date: 6 November 1984
- Distance: 3200m
- Winning horse: Black Knight
- Winning time: 3:18.90
- Final odds: 10/1
- Jockey: Peter Cook
- Trainer: George Hanlon
- Owner: Robert Holmes à Court
- Surface: Turf

Black Knight got to the lead with Chagemar at the 300, from Rocky Rullah, they're clear of Rose And Thistle at the head of the others and then Mapperley Heights running on. But it's Black Knight in front at the 200, from Chagemar, Mapperley Heights running home well but it's Black Knight's Melbourne Cup! He's drawing away to win by two and a half lengths! Chagemar will run second from Mapperley Heights, Rose and Thistle.

— Commentator Bill Collins describes the climax of the race.

The 1984 Melbourne Cup was a handicap horse race which took place on Tuesday, 6 November 1984 over 3200m, at Flemington Racecourse.

The race was won by the Western Australian bred gelding Black Knight, trained by George Hanlon and ridden by Peter Cook. The runner up was Chagemar, trained by Geoff Murphy, and third place went to Mapperley Heights trained by Colin Hayes. The winning margin was two and a half lengths and a further neck to the third placegetter.

== Background ==
The 1984 Melbourne Cup was marred by controversy a day before it started when the 1983 Melbourne Cup winner, Kiwi was scratched from the race by the veterinary stewards. This was despite Kiwi's trainer Snow Lupton and Jim Cassidy, the jockey who rode him to the prior year's sensational victory, protesting to his soundness.

Black Knight owned by Robert Holmes à Court was sired by Silver Knight, a New Zealand-bred stallion who won the 1971 Melbourne Cup. Prior to the Cup Black Knight was placed second in the Geelong Cup and third in the Dalgety Handicap, both races won by Chagemar. Black Knight ran in the 1985 and 1986 Melbourne Cups finishing 9th and 15th respectively.

Black Knight's success gave Hanlon his third success in the Cup following on from Piping Lane (1972) and Arwon (1978).

It was second Melbourne Cup win for Peter Cook, following his win in the 1981 Cup with Just a Dash. Cook's father Billy Cook had ridden the winners of the 1941 Melbourne Cup (Skipton) and 1945 Melbourne Cup (Rainbird).

== Field ==
The following are the placegetters in the 1984 Melbourne Cup.

Place	Horse	Weight (kg)	Trainer	Jockey
1st	Black Knight	50	George Hanlon	Peter Cook
2nd	Chagemar	54.5	Geoff Murphy	Darren Gauci
3rd	Mapperley Heights	51	Colin Hayes	Brent Thomson
4th	Rose and Thistle	52.5		Ben Skelton
5th	Foxseal			
6th	Affinity		Jim Maloney	
