= 1983 Melbourne Cup =

Edition of the Melbourne Cup

- Melbourne Cup
- Location: Flemington Racecourse
- Date: 1 Nov 1983
- Distance: 3200 Meters
- Winning horse: Kiwi
- Winning time: 3:19.9
- Final odds: 9/1
- Jockey: Jim Cassidy
- Trainer: Ewen S. Lupton
- Surface: Turf

250 metres left to go, Chaiamare, being tackled by Mr. Jazz and Noble Comment, Mr. Jazz on the outside, Noble Comment the centre, Chaiamare, No Peer running on. Noble Comment on the inside and Mr. Jazz, Noble Comment takes the lead, Kiwi! Kiwi will beat them all it's coming from last! Kiwi! Kiwi has won the Melbourne Cup, a blistering performance.

— Commentator John Russel describes the climax of the race

The 1983 Melbourne Cup was a two-mile handicap horse race which took place on Tuesday, 1 November 1983. The race, run over 3,200 metres (1.988 mi), at Flemington Racecourse.

The race was won by Kiwi who came from a seemingly unwinnable position at the 400 meter mark to hit the front with 50 meters to go and beating Noble Comment by a length and three quarters Earlier in the same year he won the Wellington Cup becoming the only horse to win the Melbourne and Wellington Cup in the same year.

== Field ==
This is a list of horses which ran in the 1983 Melbourne Cup.

Place	Horse	Trainer	Jockey
1st	Kiwi	Ewen S. Lupton	Jim Cassidy
2nd	Noble Comment	George Hanlon	Robert Heffernan
3rd	Mr. Jazz	Bart Cummings	John Marshall
4th	No Peer	Bart Cummings	J Miller
5th	Veloso	M G Harnes	Peter Cook
6th	Chiamare	Tommy Smith	Mick Dittman
7th	Fountaincourt	C Pfefferie	Noel Harris
8th	Hussar's Command	E B Murrary	W Treloar
9th	Chagemar	Geoff Murphy	Darren Gauci
10th	Nostradamus	Graeme Rogerson	B Clements
11th	Triumphal March	Peter Hayes	Brent Thomson
12th	Toujours Mio	J P Courtney	R Dawkins
13th	Chez Nous	Colin Hayes	Michael Clarke
14th	Machtvogel	E W Laing	P Jarman
15th	Hayai	J R Lee	N Voigt
16th	Just a Dash	Tommy Smith	Harry White
17th	Noble Heights	N Begg	Ron Quinton
18th	Home Maid	Paul Perry	Brian Andrews
19th	Mervon Boy	R Armstrong	Bob Skelton
20th	Bianco Lady	Colin Hayes	Greg Hall
21st	La Cocotte	Tony Lopes	P Alderman
22nd	English Wonder	John Hawkins	P Shepherd
23rd	Combat	Tommy Smith	C Dinn
24th	Amarant	George Hanlon	John Letts
