= 1978 Melbourne Cup =

Edition of the Melbourne Cup

- Melbourne Cup
- Location: Flemington Racecourse
- Date: 7 Nov 1978
- Distance: 3200m
- Winning horse: Arwon
- Winning time: 3:24.30
- Final odds: 5/1
- Jockey: Harry White
- Trainer: George Hanlon
- Owner: Doon Brothers Syndicate
- Surface: Turf

"Boldness took the lead, Arwon raced to him now with Karu the outside. Arwon just the leader, Karu trying to peg him back from Boldness then So Called and Dandeleith. But it's Arwon in front near the cup, Dandeleith getting though in the centre but Arwon the outside has won the cup about a neck to Dandeleith! A neck away third Karu, fourth Boldness."

— Commentator Bill Collins describes the climax of the race

The 1978 Melbourne Cup was a handicap horse race which took place on Tuesday, 7 November 1978 over 3200m, at Flemington Racecourse.

The race was won by the New Zealand bred gelding Arwon, trained by George Hanlon and ridden by Harry White. The runner up was Dandaleith, trained by A P Pringle, and third place went to Karu trained by J Holme. The winning margin was a short neck with a further neck to third place. Dandaleith was ridden by the 16 year old Toby Autridge.

== Background ==
Arwon started his career in New Zealand where he was raced under the name Flash Guy. After one win there he was purchased for $18,000 by the Doon Brothers Syndicate and moved to the Canberra stable of John Morrissey. The name Arwon was a reversal of the New South Wales town Nowra. He was only transferred to George Hanlon four months before the Melbourne Cup and was placed 2nd behind Ming Dynasty in the Metropolitan Handicap. Arwon also won the 1978 Herbert Power Handicap and the 1980 Sandown Cup.

This win was the second Melbourne Cup victory for George Hanlon, his previous success was the outsider Piping Lane in the 1972 Melbourne Cup.

It was the third of four Melbourne Cup wins for Harry White, he also won on Think Big (1974 and 1975) and subsequently Hyperno (1979) for Bart Cummings. Arwon's regular jockey Gary Willetts was unfortunate to miss the ride due to a suspension.

== Field ==
The following are the placegetters in the 1978 Melbourne Cup.

Place	Number	Horse	Weight (kg)	Odds	Trainer	Jockey
1st	12	Arwon (NZ)	50.5	5-1	George Hanlon	Harry White
2nd	13	Dandaleith (NZ)	50.5	20-1	A P Pringle	Toby Autridge
3rd	22	Karu (NZ)	48	40-1	J Holme	Warwick Robinson
4th	14	Boldness (NZ)	50	20-1		A G Clarke
5th	5	So Called (NZ)	54.5	9-2		B Thompson
6th	8	Jury	52	25-1		A Treveno
7th	10	Big Skipper (NZ)	51	12-1		John Stocker
8th	9	Valadero	51.5	33-1		G Palmer
9th	6	Our Big Gamble (NZ)	53.5	12-1		B Compton
10th	1	Panamint (IRE)	56	9-1		Roy Higgins
11th	24	Vive Velours (NZ)	48	10-1		Johnny Letts
12th	4	Lefroy (NZ)	54.5	40-1		B Andrews
13th	7	Belmura Lad (NZ)	52.5	25-1		P Trotter
14th	16	Rain Circle	50	25-1		M Doningo
15th	17	Becidium (NZ)	49	50-1		R Quinton
16th	2	Taksan (NZ)	55.5	10-1		J Duggan
17th	20	Rang Again	49	33-1		L Masters
18th	21	Bilgola Boy	48	400-1		D Green
19th	19	Drumshambo	49	125-1		K Mitchell
20th	3	Stormy Rex	55	40-1		K Langby
21st	18	Decelea	49	250-1		M Broadfoot
22nd	23	Massuk	48.5	66-1		G Murphy
Scratched	11	Lady Athenaia		n/a		
Scratched	15	Mainspring		n/a		
