= 1986 Melbourne Cup =

Edition of the Melbourne Cup

- Melbourne Cup
- Location: Flemington Racecourse
- Date: 4 Nov 1986
- Distance: 3200 Meters
- Winning horse: At Talaq
- Winning time: 3:21.7
- Final odds: 10/1
- Jockey: Michael Clarke
- Trainer: Colin Hayes
- Surface: Turf

At Talaq at the 300's burst away from Rising Fear, two lengths to Sea Legend further back Joal, Mr. Lomondy, Kiwi with a late run. At Talaq in front from Rising Fear, Kiwi running on with Sea legend, Clarke's got it won I think. At Talaq's a length and a half in front of Rising Fear, Colin Hayes wins his second Cup!

— Commentator Bruce McAvaney describes the climax of the race

The 1986 Melbourne Cup was a two-mile handicap horse race which took place on Tuesday, 5 November 1986. The race, run over 3,200 metres (1.988 mi), at Flemington Racecourse.

The 1986 Melbourne Cup was won by At Talaq, who was bought by Sheik Hamdan bin Rashid Al Maktoum for $800,000, and was sent to England to be trained by Harry Thomson Jones. He raced successfully and won the Grand Prix de Paris at Longchamp Racecourse before going to Australia to be trained by Colin Hayes. In his six-year-old season he won the Mackinnon Stakes before his victory in the Melbourne Cup; both times the son of Roberto was ridden by Michael Clarke. 1983 winner Kiwi was fourth, 1988 winner Empire Rose was fifth, and the 1984 winner Black Knight finished down the order.

== Field ==
This is a list of horses which ran in the 1986 Melbourne Cup.

Place	Horse	Trainer	Jockey
1st	At Talaq	Colin Hayes	Michael Clarke
2nd	Rising Fear	L D Pickering	Bob Skelton
3rd	Sea Legend	Colin Alderson	Shane Dye
4th	Kiwi	Snow Lupton	Noel Harris
5th	Empire Rose	Bart Cummings	D Murphy
6th	My Tristram's Belle	A Jones	C Dinn
7th	Reckless Tradition	D Atkins	R Thompson
8th	Mr. Lomondy	Noel Eales	David Walsh
9th	Joal	W C Winder	R McKay
10th	Born To Be Queen	N Begg	Ron Quinton
11th	Mint Mister	George Hanlon	Harry White
12th	Fil De Roi	I MacDonald	M Pay
13th	Our Sophia	George Hanlon	Gary Willets
14th	Enchanteur	K Rogerson	P Jarman
15th	Black Knight	George Hanlon	Greg Hall
16th	Indian Raj	Brian Mayfield-Smith	Jim Cassidy
17th	Just Now	J Atkins	Darren Gauci
18th	Samasaan	G Jackson	Chris Johnson
19th	Fordyce	G W Symons	G Doughty
20th	Final Advance	G Sanders	Larry Cassidy
21st	Waratah Bay	George Hanlon	K Forrester
22nd	Dark Intruder	Jim Moloney	Pat Hyland
