= 1941 Melbourne Cup =

Edition of the Melbourne Cup

- Melbourne Cup
- Location: Flemington Racecourse
- Date: 4 Nov 1941
- Distance: 2 miles
- Winning horse: Skipton
- Winning time: 3:23.75
- Final odds: 8/1
- Jockey: Billy Cook
- Trainer: Jack Fryer
- Surface: Turf

And with about a furlong and a half to go, there are many with a show in the cup, where the first to get to the front is Son of Aurous on the outside of Laureate and there fighting it out with Skipton coming from the clouds now and Skipton has got to the front inside the final furlong and he's holding Son Of Aurous with Beau Vite coming home hard, but it looks like Skipton's Melbourne Cup, as they get close to the post and Skipton wins the Melbourne Cup of 1941 from Son Of Aurous, third Beau Vite, followed by Laureate.

— Commentator Ken Howard describes the climax of the race

The 1941 Melbourne Cup was a two-mile handicap horse race which took place on Tuesday, 4 November 1941.

== Details ==
Skipton, son of 1935 Melbourne Cup winner Marabou, won the race and is the last three-year old to win the Melbourne Cup and the last to complete the VRC Derby-Melbourne Cup double. Skipton was trained by Jack Fryer who won his second Melbourne Cup after training Wotan in 1936. Skipton was ridden by Fryer's son-in-law, Norman Creighton in the Derby but Creighton couldn't make the weight for the Cup. Therefore, Sydney jockey Billy Cook, rode Skipton who carried 7st 7lb (47.5kg) to victory. Cook would win the Melbourne Cup again in 1945 on Rainbird. His son Peter Cook, also won two Melbourne Cups, aboard Just a Dash in 1981 and Black Knight in 1984. The Cooks are the only father-son pair to win the Melbourne Cup as a jockey. Son of Aurous ran second and two-time Cox Plate and Mackinnon Stakes winner Beau Vite finished third after running fourth in the 1940 Cup. Skipton was the 23rd three-year old to win the Melbourne Cup and 20th colt to win the race. 32.3% of Cup winners from 1861–1941 were three-year-olds but no horse has done so since and few have even been in the race.

This is the list of placegetters for the 1941 Melbourne Cup.

Place	Name	Jockey	Trainer
1	Skipton	W. Cook	J. Fryer
2	Son of Auros	T. Unkovich	F. G. Doran
3	Gay Helios	D. Munro	F. McGrath

== See also ==
- Melbourne Cup
- List of Melbourne Cup winners
- Victoria Racing Club
