= Dark flight =

Dark flight can refer to

- Dark Flight, a 2012 Thai horror film
- Dark flight (astronomy), a phase in the descent of some larger meteors where the meteorite falls at terminal velocity
- Drawn: Dark Flight, the second installment in the Drawn series of games
- Dark Flight, the dam of The Night Patrol, the 1924 winner of the W. S. Cox Plate thoroughbred horse race
