= Black Knight (horse) =

Australian-bred Thoroughbred racehorse

- Sire: Silver Knight
- Grandsire: Alcimedes
- Dam: Brenta
- Damsire: Coeur Volant
- Sex: Gelding
- Foaled: 27 August 1979
- Country: Australia
- Colour: Bay or Brown
- Breeder: Robert Holmes à Court
- Owner: Robert Holmes à Court
- Trainer: George Hanlon
- Record: 60: 9–4–7
- Earnings: $454,850

Major wins
- Melbourne Cup (1984)

Black Knight (27 August 1979–2002) was an Australian Thoroughbred racehorse. He was best known for winning the Melbourne Cup at Flemington Racecourse in November 1984.

== Background ==
Black Knight was a dark bay horse bred in Western Australia by his owner Robert Holmes à Court, a South-African born businessman described during the 1980s as Australia's richest man. He was sired by Silver Knight, a New Zealand-bred stallion who won the 1971 Melbourne Cup. The horse was sent into training with the veteran George Hanlon at his training base at Leopold, Victoria. Black Knight was gelded early in his life and usually raced in blinkers.

== Racing career ==
Black Knight established himself as a contender for the 1984 Melbourne Cup when finishing placed behind Chagemar in the Geelong Cup and The Dalgety. In the build-up to the race, the gelding was the subject of a major gamble, being backed down from odds of 50/1 to 11/1 shortly before the event. Despite the support of betters, Black Knight's regular jockey Robert Heffernan rejected him, preferring to ride Martian's Son. The Sydney-based jockey Peter Cook, who had only ever seen the horse on television, was booked to take the ride on four days before the race. In the Cup, Black Knight carried 50kg started at odds of 10/1 in a field of nineteen runners. Cook sent him into the lead 250 metres from the finish and he stayed on to win by two and a half lengths from Chagemar. His success gave Hanlon his third success in the race following Piping Lane in 1972 and Arwon in 1978.

== Retirement ==
After his retirement from racing, Black Knight was retrained as a police horse, and served for several years with the Victoria Police. He was retired from duty in 1995, although he regularly took part in parades of past winners before the running of the Melbourne Cup. In July 2002 he contracted a bacterial infection which led to kidney failure. He was euthanised and buried on the farm where he had spent his retirement.

== Pedigree ==
Pedigree of Black Knight (AUS), bay or brown gelding, 1979
Sire Silver Knight (NZ) 1967	Alcimedes (GB); 1954	Alycidon	Donatello
Sire Silver Knight (NZ) 1967	Alcimedes (GB); 1954	Alycidon	Aurora
Sire Silver Knight (NZ) 1967	Alcimedes (GB); 1954	Honey Hill	Panorama
Sire Silver Knight (NZ) 1967	Alcimedes (GB); 1954	Honey Hill	Calgary
Sire Silver Knight (NZ) 1967	Cuban Fox (NZ); 1952	Foxbridge	Foxlaw
Sire Silver Knight (NZ) 1967	Cuban Fox (NZ); 1952	Foxbridge	Bridgemount
Sire Silver Knight (NZ) 1967	Cuban Fox (NZ); 1952	Chubin	Nizami
Sire Silver Knight (NZ) 1967	Cuban Fox (NZ); 1952	Chubin	Ann Acre
Dam Brenta (AUS) 1962	Coeur Volant (GB); 1957	Palestine	Fair Trial
Dam Brenta (AUS) 1962	Coeur Volant (GB); 1957	Palestine	Una
Dam Brenta (AUS) 1962	Coeur Volant (GB); 1957	Diableretta	Dante (horse)
Dam Brenta (AUS) 1962	Coeur Volant (GB); 1957	Diableretta	Dodamo
Dam Brenta (AUS) 1962	Paper Moon (AUS); 1953	St Magnus	Sansovino
Dam Brenta (AUS) 1962	Paper Moon (AUS); 1953	St Magnus	Fair Isle
Dam Brenta (AUS) 1962	Paper Moon (AUS); 1953	Valley Belle	Suzerain
Dam Brenta (AUS) 1962	Paper Moon (AUS); 1953	Valley Belle	Canon Belle (Family: 13-e)
