= Almaarad =

British-bred Thoroughbred racehorse

- Sire: Ela-Mana-Mou (IRE)
- Grandsire: Pitcairn (IRE)
- Dam: Silk Blend (IRE)
- Damsire: Busted (GB)
- Sex: Stallion
- Foaled: 30 April 1983
- Country: United Kingdom
- Colour: Chestnut
- Trainer: John Dunlop; Colin Hayes
- Record: In Europe - 20: 9-2-3; In Australia - 4: 3-1-0
- Earnings: A$1,940,213

Major wins
- Curragh Cup (1987); Prix Kergorlay (1987); Grand Prix de Deauville (1987); Hardwicke Stakes (1988); Jockey Club Stakes (1988); Aral-Pokal (1988); W S Cox Plate (1989); Caulfield Stakes (1989); Underwood Stakes (1989)

Awards
- Australian Champion Racehorse of the Year (1990)

Almaarad was a Thoroughbred race horse owned by Hamdan bin Rashid Al Maktoum, who won a number of stakes races both in Europe and Australia.

Trained in Australia by Colin Hayes, he is best known for his win in the 1989 Cox Plate when ridden by Michael Clarke.

Following a short but successful racing career in Australia which yielded 3 wins from 4 starts he was retired to stud in 1990.

== Pedigree ==
Pedigree of Almaarad
Sire Ela-Mana-Mou 1976	Pitcairn 1971	Petingo	Petition
Sire Ela-Mana-Mou 1976	Pitcairn 1971	Petingo	Alcazar
Sire Ela-Mana-Mou 1976	Pitcairn 1971	Border Bounty	Bounteous
Sire Ela-Mana-Mou 1976	Pitcairn 1971	Border Bounty	B Flat
Sire Ela-Mana-Mou 1976	Rose Bertin 1970	High Hat	Hyperion
Sire Ela-Mana-Mou 1976	Rose Bertin 1970	High Hat	Madonna
Sire Ela-Mana-Mou 1976	Rose Bertin 1970	Wide Awake	Major Portion
Sire Ela-Mana-Mou 1976	Rose Bertin 1970	Wide Awake	Wake Island
Dam Silk Blend 1975	Busted 1963	Crepello	Donatello
Dam Silk Blend 1975	Busted 1963	Crepello	Crepuscule
Dam Silk Blend 1975	Busted 1963	Sans Le Sou	Vimy
Dam Silk Blend 1975	Busted 1963	Sans Le Sou	Martial Loan
Dam Silk Blend 1975	Silken Yogan 1958	Ballyogan	Fair Trial
Dam Silk Blend 1975	Silken Yogan 1958	Ballyogan	Serial
Dam Silk Blend 1975	Silken Yogan 1958	Silken Star	Arctic Star
Dam Silk Blend 1975	Silken Yogan 1958	Silken Star	Silken Slipper
