= Unaware =

2010 American film

- Festival release poster
- Directed by: Sean Bardin; Robert Cooley
- Written by: Sean Bardin
- Produced by: Sean Bardin; Robert Cooley
- Edited by: Richard Allen Crook
- Production company: Cooley Productions
- Release date: November 13, 2010 (Wanderings Film Festival)
- Running time: 81 minutes
- Country: United States
- Language: English

Unaware is an American science-fiction horror thriller film directed by Sean Bardin and Robert Cooley. It follows a vacationing couple who discover something disturbing on a rural Texas ranch. Like the films Paranormal Activity (2007) and The Blair Witch Project (1999), Unaware is an independent feature presented in "found footage" format. The producers have also followed in marketing the film to potential fans via Eventful.

== Plot ==
In July 2010, vacationing couple Joe and Lisa are on their way to visit Joe’s grandparents documenting their trip by camcorder only to arrive finding a locked gate. Joe finally gets the property gate open. They arrive at the house to find a note on the door that his grandparents are away for a couple of days. Joe locates the hidden house keys and they enter the house, explore the yard and his grandfather's classic Oldsmobile Cutlass in the garage. Later that evening Joe proposes to Lisa and they get engaged. Joe attempts to explain to Lisa how his grandfather always kept him away from the backyard shed when he was younger.

That night, Joe surveys his grandfather's old shed with a chained door far in the backyard. Joe hears a loud humming noise in the shed and later finally breaks into the shed with Lisa finding old military technology running and news clippings of the 1947 Roswell UFO incident. Joe finds a large, sealed crate but does not open it. The next night Joe and Lisa return to the shed, Joe opens the crate only to find a flashing light and a lifeless Alien. Scared, they quickly run back to the house and argue about calling the authorities. Fearing for his grandfather's life, Joe calls the FBI to report the alien discovery. One FBI agent shows up and to their surprise don’t believe them.

Later that night they decide to leave the premises. Joe returns to the shed to seal it and cover the evidence. They pack the car and Joe notices he left the keys in the shed, leaving Lisa alone at the car while he returns to the shed to find the keys. Lisa sees an alien life form in the flashlight, screams and runs to Joe. More aliens appear and pursue the couple. A bright light supposedly being an alien spacecraft appears, Lisa falls and breaks her leg, and Joe is knocked out. Lisa is dragged away and abducted by the aliens that leave on the ship. Joe wakes up later saved from the attack and calls for Lisa. Joe runs to the garage to escape in the Cutlass only to find the steering wheel locked, runs back to the yard only to bump into the same FBI agent now with his partner observing while Joe begs for help. Joe is knocked out by an unseen force, the camera falls to the ground and the FBI agent steps on it ending the footage.

After the text has rolled by, a short additional view is seen, displaying something in a black plastic bag with something looking like tufts of hair sticking out one of its corners, before the film ends, this time completely.

== Cast ==
As of 2012, a cast has not been revealed. The producers have also protested speculation that the film is a mockumentary, fueling criticism towards the film.

== Production ==
Production Was filmed in the Dallas/Fort Worth metroplex. The beginning of film is in Grand Prairie, Texas.

According to the film's trailer and critic reviews, the film involves "evidence" relating to the 1947 Roswell UFO incident. Audio from an original radio broadcast can be heard in the opening of the film's trailer and is used in the film as well. In addition, the film has no on-screen credits with exception to Sean Bardin, Robert Cooley, and Richard Allen Crook.

== Release ==
Unaware premiered in North America at the Wanderings Film Festival in Huntsville, Alabama, on November 13, 2010. Subsequent premieres included the 12th annual Nevermore Film Festival in Durham, North Carolina on February 18–19, 2011, and the 4th annual Indy Horror Film Festival in DeKalb, Illinois on March 6, 2011. The film premiered at the Bare Bones International Film Festival in Muskogee, Oklahoma on April 26, 2011.

According to Fangoria, the film will be released on DVD on March 12, 2013. The distributor is Cinema Epoch, which releases films via Entertainment One.

As of October 27, 2020, the movie is available for streaming on Amazon Prime Video.

== Reception ==
As of December 2012, Unaware has won 7 awards and received 3 nominations, including an "Award of Merit" from the Accolade Competition, an "Orson Welles Award" in the California Film Awards, and "Honorable Mention" in the Los Angeles Movie Awards. It received the "Special Recognition Award" and was nominated for "Best Feature Film" and "Best Special Effects" at the Indy Horror Film Festival. It was awarded the "Official Best of Fest Award" in two categories by Rick Stevenson's international competition, which places the film in the top 5% out of the 30,000 short films and 7,000 feature films considered by the committee that includes members of the Sundance Institute. Unaware also won "Best Screenplay" at Nashville's Full Moon Horror Film Festival in May 2011

Doc Rotten, a full-time critic who writes for numerous film review websites, including HorrorNews.Net, gave the film a 6.5 out of 10 rating and stated that it "provides intense thrills and chills leaving the film with an exciting, frightening conclusion."

In an effort to boost publicity and persuade other indie filmmakers to follow suit, the Unaware producers announced in March 2011 that they had teamed up with the National Center for Missing and Exploited Children by committing a significant percentage of the film's profits to charity, having already made a donation to the William J. Clinton Foundation in the name of the film.
