= Think Big (horse) =

New Zealand-bred Thoroughbred racehorse

- Sire: Sobig
- Grandsire: Summertime
- Dam: Sarcelle
- Damsire: Oman
- Sex: Gelding
- Foaled: 1970
- Died: 23 February 1995 (aged 24–25)
- Country: New Zealand
- Colour: Bay
- Breeder: Estate of L. A. Alexander
- Owner: Dato Tan Chin Nam & Rick O'Sullivan
- Trainer: Bart Cummings

Major wins
- Hotham Handicap (1974); Melbourne Cup (1974, 1975)

Think Big (1970 – 23 February 1995) was a Thoroughbred racehorse who raced in Australia, winning the Melbourne Cup in both 1974 and 1975.

== Background ==
Bred by the estate of the late L. A. Alexander, Think Big was purchased by Australian trainer Bart Cummings for Malaysian businessman, Dato Tan Chin Nam for $10,000 at the Trentham yearling sales in New Zealand. Initially co-owned by Dato Tan Chin Nam and Queensland property developer Rick O'Sullivan, the two owners later included Malaysia's first Prime Minister ('the Father of Malaysia') Tunku Abdul Rahman in Think Big's interests. He was conditioned for racing by Cummings, who maintained a share in the horse.

== Racing career ==
Think Big started eight times at age two, earning just one win. As a three-year-old he had fifteen starts for five wins. His third to Igloo in the Brisbane Cup was an indication of better things to come.

The popular Bart Cummings trained mare Leilani was the favourite for the 1974 Melbourne Cup but she was run down in the last fifty metres by her stablemate Think Big under jockey Harry White. The win gave Cummings his fourth Melbourne Cup win and his third quinella of the race.

Following his second last in the lead up MacKinnon Stakes, Think Big started at 33–1 in the 1975 Melbourne Cup, assigned high-weight of 58 kg. He had not won a race since his victory the previous year. But at his favourite course and distance, again under jockey Harry White, he fought off a challenge from stablemate Holiday Waggon to record his second win.

== Retirement ==
A gelding, after his racing career was over Think Big lived out his days at jockey Harry White's 200-hectare farm in Gisborne near Victoria, Australia where he died, on 23 February 1995, and is buried.

In his autobiography Bart: My Life Cummings recounts the story of Think Big being named by co-owner Rick O'Sullivan's wife Joan at a dinner between the O'Sullivans and Dato Tan Chin Nam in Melbourne. When the subject of the possibility of winning the Melbourne Cup was raised, Joan O'Sullivan said to her husband "You are always thinking big."

== See also ==
- List of Melbourne Cup winners
