= Kiwi (horse) =

New Zealand-bred Thoroughbred racehorse

- Sire: Blarney Kiss (USA)
- Grandsire: Irish Lancer (USA)
- Dam: Malrayvis (NZ)
- Damsire: Messmate (GB)
- Sex: Gelding
- Foaled: 19 October 1977
- Died: 2 February 1995
- Country: New Zealand
- Colour: Chestnut
- Breeder: Brian Fischer
- Owner: Snow Lupton
- Trainer: Snow Lupton
- Record: 60:13-8-2
- Earnings: NZ$549,839

Major wins
- Wellington Cup (1983); Egmont Cup (1983); Melbourne Cup (1983)
- Last updated on 3 April 2009

Kiwi (19 October 1977 – 2 February 1995) was a New Zealand Thoroughbred racehorse who won both the Wellington Cup in New Zealand and the Melbourne Cup in Australia in 1983. Kiwi is especially renowned for his last-to-first victory in the Melbourne Cup, and remains the only horse in history to have won both of these cups. Kiwi raced from 1980 to 1987, and died on 2 February 1995 at the age of 17.

== Background ==
Kiwi was bred by Brian Fischer in Parore, New Zealand. He was bought for NZ$1000 by Waverley sheep farmer Snow Lupton and his wife Anne, with Anne's personal preference for him to have a chestnut hair coat. They had previously owned a Blarney Kiss horse. Though Kiwi showed promise as a racehorse, Lupton believed the horse would perform better as a distance runner.

== Racing career ==
Kiwi won the Wellington Cup in January 1983 from the rear of the field in a close finish, with a time of 3 minutes 20.29 seconds.

Despite winning the Wellington Cup earlier in the year, Kiwi was still considered by numerous bookmakers as an outsider for the Melbourne Cup and started with odds of 10/1. Similar to the previous race, Kiwi's jockey Jim Cassidy began the race by settling the horse at the very back of the 24-horse field. At the turn of the Flemington track, with 500 metres remaining, Kiwi was positioned as the second last horse. The last horse was Amarant, which had been injured and was running lame.

Upon approaching the final straight, Kiwi began to advance through the field. At the finish line, Kiwi won the race by just over a length. Many race commentators only mentioned Kiwi's name as he neared the finish line, for example, "and here comes Kiwi out of the blue". Kiwi's victory in 1983 has become one of the most memorable performances in the history of the Melbourne Cup, and illustrated a classic stayer's victory. Kiwi has become a household sporting hero in New Zealand and formed a key example of the underdog winning a horse race against the odds. Lupton openly admitted that Kiwi was used to "round up the sheep" as part of his conditioning routine.

Kiwi entered the 1984 Melbourne Cup, but was controversially scratched due to a veterinary check. Lupton always maintained that Kiwi was fit for the race and could have won. The event sparked criticism of the scratching as a potential act of bad sportsmanship, due to the rivalry between New Zealand and Australia. Kiwi also ran in the 1985 Melbourne Cup finishing thirteenth. In the 1986 Melbourne Cup, he was positioned well to repeat his 1983 'come-from-behind' victory, but was injured and pulled up lame close to the finish line still managing to finish fourth. Kiwi also ran in the 1984 Japan Cup, where he represented New Zealand and finished at 6th place behind Katsuragi Ace.

== Retirement ==
Kiwi is the only horse to have won both the Wellington Cup and Melbourne Cup consecutively. This historical feat is highly regarded, especially as the Melbourne Cup is esteemed as the premier staying race in Australia and New Zealand.

In 1987, Kiwi was retired to the Luptons' farm, where he died and was buried in 1995. Lupton said it was natural cause. The headstone simply states: "Kiwi, 1983 Melbourne Cup". A plaque commemorating Kiwi is also located at the Waverley Racecourse.

== Pedigree ==
Pedigree of Kiwi (NZ), chestnut gelding 1977
| Sire Blarney Kiss (USA) 1965 | Irish Lancer (USA); 1957 | Royal Charger | Nearco |
| Sire Blarney Kiss (USA) 1965 | Irish Lancer (USA); 1957 | Royal Charger | Sun Princess |
| Sire Blarney Kiss (USA) 1965 | Irish Lancer (USA); 1957 | Tige O'Myheart | Bull Lea |
| Sire Blarney Kiss (USA) 1965 | Irish Lancer (USA); 1957 | Tige O'Myheart | Unerring |
| Sire Blarney Kiss (USA) 1965 | Log House (USA); 1956 | Cosmic Bomb | Pharamond |
| Sire Blarney Kiss (USA) 1965 | Log House (USA); 1956 | Cosmic Bomb | Banish Fear |
| Sire Blarney Kiss (USA) 1965 | Log House (USA); 1956 | Ariel Beauty | Ariel |
| Sire Blarney Kiss (USA) 1965 | Log House (USA); 1956 | Ariel Beauty | Big Beauty |
| Dam Malrayvis (NZ) 1963 | Messmate (GB); 1954 | Blue Peter | Fairway |
| Dam Malrayvis (NZ) 1963 | Messmate (GB); 1954 | Blue Peter | Fancy Free |
| Dam Malrayvis (NZ) 1963 | Messmate (GB); 1954 | Run Honey | Hyperion |
| Dam Malrayvis (NZ) 1963 | Messmate (GB); 1954 | Run Honey | Fancy Free |
| Dam Malrayvis (NZ) 1963 | Grande Vitesse (NZ); 1952 | Beau Repaire | Beau Pere |
| Dam Malrayvis (NZ) 1963 | Grande Vitesse (NZ); 1952 | Beau Repaire | Modiste |
| Dam Malrayvis (NZ) 1963 | Grande Vitesse (NZ); 1952 | Satisfied | Siegfried |
| Dam Malrayvis (NZ) 1963 | Grande Vitesse (NZ); 1952 | Satisfied | Satisfy (Family 2-b) |

== Honours ==
In 2012, Australian rail operator CFCL Australia named locomotive CF4406 "Kiwi" after the horse.

In 2022 a bronze statue of Kiwi was constructed. A life-size plasticine mould of Kiwi, with jockey Jim Cassidy on its back in full flight, was donated to Waverley by New Plymouth artist, the late Fridtjof Hanson. $155,000 was allocated from Waverley's masterplan arts grant to cover the cost of bronzing the statue at Heavy Metals in Lower Hutt. It was originally hoped the statue would be completed and installed early in 2023. After delays in the bronzing the Statue was unveiled on Sunday 10 September 2023 at Gulley Park in Waverley, the event followed by a race meeting at the Waverley Racing Cup.

== See also ==
- Kiwi winning the Melbourne Cup - Youtube
- List of Melbourne Cup winners
- Kiwi's pedigree and partial racing stats
