= Bletchingly =

Australian-bred Thoroughbred racehorse

- Sire: Biscay
- Grandsire: Star Kingdom (IRE)
- Dam: Coogee (GB) (7)
- Damsire: Relic (USA)
- Sex: Stallion
- Foaled: 1970
- Country: Australia
- Colour: Brown
- Breeder: Stanley Wootton
- Trainer: Angus Armanasco
- Record: 5: 4-1-0
- Earnings: A$28,725

Major wins
- The Galaxy Handicap (1975)

Awards
- Leading sire in Australia (1980, 1981, 1982)

Honours
- Bletchingly Stakes at Caulfield Racecourse
- Last updated on 23 May 2009

Bletchingly (1970–1993) was an Australian Thoroughbred racehorse and stallion. A brilliant sprinter, he was by the successful speed stallion Biscay out of Coogee (GB) (by Relic (USA)). Bletchingly was bred by Stanley Wootton on the Baramul Stud in the Widden Valley, and was a three-quarter brother to another high-class sprinter, Beaches (by Todman). Stanley Wootton had imported Bletchingly's grandsire, Star Kingdom (IRE), from the United Kingdom in the 1950s, and the Irish stallion established Australia's foremost 20th century sireline.

== Racing career ==
Thought by his owner to be too small and unsound for a long racing career, Bletchingly was unraced as a two-year-old and won his only start as a three-year-old at the provincial track of Bendigo. At four, he showcased his ability by winning The Galaxy Stakes at Randwick and the Moomba Handicap at Flemington, in which he equalled the course record of 56.8 seconds for 1,000 metres. His five-start career produced four wins and a second, and prize money of A$28,715.

== Stud record ==
Entering Widden Stud in the spring of 1975, Bletchingly was an immediate success. His first crop included Kingston Town, who was named Australia's champion racehorse in 1980, and he was the leading sire in Australia from 1980 to 1982. Subsequent crops included 1984's champion Emancipation, the Golden Slipper winners Star Watch (1988) and Canny Lad (1990), and the Group One winners Canny Lass (won three G1 races), Coronation Day (two G1 wins), Boardwalk Angel, Kenny's Best Pal (VRC Australian Guineas), Spirit Of Kingston, Best Western (won AJC Spring Champion Stakes), True Version and Wrap Around. His progeny were also notable for winning over a variety of distances.

Bletchingly died on 13 July 1993 having sired 61 individual Group winners of 174 Group races. Since his death, he has been a leading broodmare sire in Australia, with his daughters producing at least 18 individual Group One winners, including Charge Forward, Bonanova, and Stella Cadente. In addition, one of his granddaughters, Shantha's Choice (by Canny Lad), is the dam of champion sire Redoute's Choice.

Bletchingly is honoured through the annual running of the Bletchingly Stakes, a Group 3, weight-for-age race over 1,100 metres at Caulfield in August.

== Sire line tree ==
- Bletchingly
  - Kingston Town
  - Best Western
  - Lord Ballina
    - Bureaucracy
    - Carsons Cash
    - Lord Tridan
    - Count Chivas
    - Lord Ted
    - Cent Home
    - Askim
    - Bocelli
    - Balmuse
  - True Version
  - Star Watch
  - Canny Lad
    - Accomplice
    - Dodge
    - Allez Suez
    - He's No Pie Eater
  - Coronation Day
  - Kennys Best Pal

== Pedigree ==
Pedigree of Bletchingly (AUS), brown stallion, 1970
Sire Biscay Ch. 1965	Star Kingdom (IRE); Ch. 1946	Stardust	Hyperion
Sire Biscay Ch. 1965	Star Kingdom (IRE); Ch. 1946	Stardust	Sister Stella
Sire Biscay Ch. 1965	Star Kingdom (IRE); Ch. 1946	Impromptu	Concerto
Sire Biscay Ch. 1965	Star Kingdom (IRE); Ch. 1946	Impromptu	Thoughtless
Sire Biscay Ch. 1965	Magic Symbol (AUS); 1956	Makarpura	Big Game
Sire Biscay Ch. 1965	Magic Symbol (AUS); 1956	Makarpura	Cap d'Or
Sire Biscay Ch. 1965	Magic Symbol (AUS); 1956	Magic Wonder	Newtown Wonder*
Sire Biscay Ch. 1965	Magic Symbol (AUS); 1956	Magic Wonder	Conveyor
Dam Coogee (GB) B. 1959	Relic (USA); 1945	War Relic	Man o' War
Dam Coogee (GB) B. 1959	Relic (USA); 1945	War Relic	Friar's Carse
Dam Coogee (GB) B. 1959	Relic (USA); 1945	Bridal Colors	Black Toney
Dam Coogee (GB) B. 1959	Relic (USA); 1945	Bridal Colors	Vaila
Dam Coogee (GB) B. 1959	Last Judgement; 1948	Fair Trial*	Fairway*
Dam Coogee (GB) B. 1959	Last Judgement; 1948	Fair Trial*	Lady Juror*
Dam Coogee (GB) B. 1959	Last Judgement; 1948	Faustina	Felstead
Dam Coogee (GB) B. 1959	Last Judgement; 1948	Faustina	Romneya (Family:7-a)

* Bletchingly is inbred 5S x 3D to the stallion Fair Trial, meaning that he appears fifth generation (via Newton Wonder) on the sire side of his pedigree, and third generation on the dam side of his pedigree.
