= Michael Clarke (jockey) =

Australian jockey

Michael Clarke is a retired Australian jockey, best known for riding At Talaq to victory in the 1986 Melbourne Cup.
