= Toparoa =

New Zealand thoroughbred racehorse

- Sire: Massowa
- Grandsire: Massine
- Dam: Miss Sally
- Damsire: Posterity
- Sex: Gelding
- Foaled: 1948
- Country: New Zealand
- Colour: Bay
- Owner: Norm McDonald
- Trainer: T J Smith
- Jockey: Neville Sellwood

Major wins
- Melbourne Cup (1955)

Toparoa (foaled 1948) was a New Zealand bred thoroughbred racehorse that was most notable for winning the 1955 Melbourne Cup.

== Melbourne Cup ==
Toparoa started as the 6/1 second favourite in the 1955 Melbourne Cup. Holding favouritism at 2/1 was future Hall of Fame champion Rising Fast who was attempting to go back-to-back after winning the race in 1954.

Rising Fast carried the top weight of 10 stone (63.5 kilograms), whilst Toparoa with jockey Neville Sellwood carried just 7 stone 8 pound (48 kilograms).

Toparoa was able to hold off the fast finishing Rising Fast to win the race by three quarters of a length and give trainer T J Smith his first winner of the Melbourne Cup. Sellwood was subsequently suspended for two months for causing interference to Rising Fast during the race, however controversy followed when no protest was lodged and Toparoa remained the winner.

== Pedigree ==
Pedigree of Toparoa (NZ) 1948
Sire Massowa (GB) 1939	Massine (FR); 1920	Consols	Doricles
Sire Massowa (GB) 1939	Massine (FR); 1920	Consols	Console
Sire Massowa (GB) 1939	Massine (FR); 1920	Mauri	Ajax
Sire Massowa (GB) 1939	Massine (FR); 1920	Mauri	La Camargo
Sire Massowa (GB) 1939	Evangeline (GB); 1933	Press Gang	Hurry On
Sire Massowa (GB) 1939	Evangeline (GB); 1933	Press Gang	Fifinella
Sire Massowa (GB) 1939	Evangeline (GB); 1933	Daughter-in-Law	Son-in-Law*
Sire Massowa (GB) 1939	Evangeline (GB); 1933	Daughter-in-Law	Clerical Error
Dam Miss Sally (NZ) 1937	Posterity (GB); 1926	Son-in-Law*	Dark Ronald
Dam Miss Sally (NZ) 1937	Posterity (GB); 1926	Son-in-Law*	Mother in Law
Dam Miss Sally (NZ) 1937	Posterity (GB); 1926	Hemlock	Spearmint
Dam Miss Sally (NZ) 1937	Posterity (GB); 1926	Hemlock	Keystone
Dam Miss Sally (NZ) 1937	Miss Thespian (NZ); 1925	Thespian	Absurd
Dam Miss Sally (NZ) 1937	Miss Thespian (NZ); 1925	Thespian	Leta
Dam Miss Sally (NZ) 1937	Miss Thespian (NZ); 1925	Sea Elf	Seaton Delaval
Dam Miss Sally (NZ) 1937	Miss Thespian (NZ); 1925	Sea Elf	St Evelyn

* Toparoa is inbred 4S x 3D to the stallion Son-in-Law, meaning that he appears fourth generation on the sire side of his pedigree and third generation on the dam side of his pedigree.
