= At Talaq (racehorse) =

American-bred Thoroughbred racehorse

- Sire: Roberto
- Grandsire: Hail To Reason
- Dam: My Nord
- Damsire: Vent du Nord
- Sex: Stallion
- Foaled: 6 March 1981
- Country: United States
- Colour: Bay
- Breeder: Carelaine Farm
- Owner: Hamdan Al Maktoum
- Trainer: Harry Thomson Jones; Colin Hayes
- Record: 26:5-6-3

Major wins
- Grand Prix de Paris (1984); Mackinnon Stakes (1986); Melbourne Cup (1986); C F Orr Stakes (1987)

Awards
- Timeform rating: 119

At Talaq (6 March 1981 – 1995) was an American-bred Thoroughbred racehorse. He had success racing in Europe but had his greatest success after being exported to Australia where he won the 1986 Melbourne Cup.

== Background ==
At Talaq was sired by Roberto out of the mare My Nord (by Vent du Nord). As a yearling he was bought by Hamdan Al-Maktoum for $US800,000 at the Fasig Tipton Saratoga Yearling Sale and sent to England to be trained by Harry Thomson Jones.

== Racing career ==
At Talaq won one of his two races as a two-year-old. The following year he finished fourth to Secreto in The Derby before winning the Grand Prix de Paris at Longchamp. He also finished second, beaten a short head in the Grosser Preis von Berlin and third in the Derby Italiano. In 1984 he failed to reproduce his best form and finished unplaced in all three of his races.

In 1986 he was sent to race in Australia where he was trained by Colin Hayes and raced for Hamdan Al Maktoum's Shadwell Racing. His best win came in the 1986 VRC Melbourne Cup. At Talaq's other significant wins included the 1986 Mackinnon Stakes and the 1987 C F Orr Stakes.

== Stud record ==
Following a successful stud career where he sired 25 stakes winners (including Skating and Al Mansour). He died in 1995 from a suspected heart attack.

== Pedigree ==
Pedigree of At Talaq (USA), brown horse, 1981
| Sire Roberto 1969 | Hail To Reason; 1958 | Turn-To (IRE) | Royal Charger (GB) |
| Sire Roberto 1969 | Hail To Reason; 1958 | Turn-To (IRE) | Source Sucree (FR) |
| Sire Roberto 1969 | Hail To Reason; 1958 | Nothirdchance | Blue Swords |
| Sire Roberto 1969 | Hail To Reason; 1958 | Nothirdchance | Galla Colors |
| Sire Roberto 1969 | Bramalea; 1959 | Nashua | Nasrullah (GB) |
| Sire Roberto 1969 | Bramalea; 1959 | Nashua | Segula |
| Sire Roberto 1969 | Bramalea; 1959 | Rarelea | Bull Lea |
| Sire Roberto 1969 | Bramalea; 1959 | Rarelea | Bleebok |
| Dam My Nord 1973 | Vent du Nord (FR); 1965 | Vandale | Plassy (GB) |
| Dam My Nord 1973 | Vent du Nord (FR); 1965 | Vandale | Vanille |
| Dam My Nord 1973 | Vent du Nord (FR); 1965 | La Caravelle | Worden |
| Dam My Nord 1973 | Vent du Nord (FR); 1965 | La Caravelle | Barquerolle |
| Dam My Nord 1973 | My Alison; 1954 | County Delight | Count Fleet |
| Dam My Nord 1973 | My Alison; 1954 | County Delight | Matriarch |
| Dam My Nord 1973 | My Alison; 1954 | Stellar Role | Bimelech |
| Dam My Nord 1973 | My Alison; 1954 | Stellar Role | Astralobe (Family 1-c) |
