= Dulcify =

New Zealand-bred Thoroughbred racehorse (1975–1979)

- Sire: Decies (GB)
- Grandsire: Pardal (FR)
- Dam: Sweet Candy (AUS)
- Damsire: Todman (AUS)
- Sex: Gelding
- Foaled: 14 October 1975
- Died: 6 November 1979 (aged 4)
- Country: New Zealand
- Colour: Bay
- Owner: Colin Hayes
- Trainer: Colin Hayes
- Record: 21: 10–2-3
- Earnings: A$568,775

Major wins
- Victoria Derby (1978); Craiglee Stakes (1979); Australian Derby (1979); Rosehill Guineas (1979); Australian Cup (1979); Turnbull Stakes (1979); LKS Mackinnon Stakes (1979); W S Cox Plate (1979)

Honours
- Australian Racing Hall of Fame; Dulcify Quality Handicap at Randwick Racecourse
- Last updated on 10 March 2014

Dulcify (14 October 1975 – 6 November 1979) was a New Zealand–bred Thoroughbred racehorse. His British-bred sire was the 1970 Irish 2,000 Guineas winner, Decies (GB), a grandson of Pharis (FR), the very important French sire who Thoroughbred Heritage describes as "considered one of the greatest French-bred runners of the century."

Dulcify's dam was the Australian mare Sweet Candy (AUS), a daughter of 1957 Golden Slipper Stakes winner and the Australian Racing Hall of Fame inductee Todman (AUS).

He was owned and raced by Colin Hayes, who had purchased him for $3,250. Hayes called him the best horse he ever raced.

A patient, come-from-behind runner, his most important career win came in the 1979 Cox Plate, which he won by a still-standing record of seven lengths. The betting favourite for the 1979 Melbourne Cup, he suffered a broken pelvis during the race and had to be euthanized.

In 2014, he was inducted into the Australian Racing Hall of Fame.
