= Beldale Ball =

American-bred Thoroughbred racehorse

- Sire: Nashua
- Grandsire: Nasrullah
- Dam: San Cat
- Damsire: Barbizon
- Sex: Stallion
- Foaled: 1976
- Died: 2004
- Country: United States
- Colour: Bay
- Owner: Swettenham Stud
- Trainer: Colin Hayes

Major wins
- Melbourne Cup (1980)

Beldale Ball (1976−2004) was a brown Thoroughbred racehorse stallion by Nashua out of the mare San Cat (by Barbizon).

Trained by Colin Hayes and owned by the Swettenham Stud Syndicate (Robert Sangster) his best win came in the 1980 VRC Melbourne Cup.

Having an undistinguished racetrack career in England as a three-year-old he was sent to Australia and Colin Hayes to train.

Ridden by John Letts and carrying the featherweight of just 49.5 kg he took the lead at the half way mark of the race and was never headed.

His victory was the first Melbourne Cup win for trainer Colin Hayes.

== Namesake ==
Australian rail operator CFCL Australia named locomotive CF4405 after the horse.

== Pedigree ==
Pedigree of Beldale Ball
Sire Nashua 1952	Nasrullah 1940	Nearco	Pharos
Sire Nashua 1952	Nasrullah 1940	Nearco	Nogara
Sire Nashua 1952	Nasrullah 1940	Mumtaz Begum	Blenheim
Sire Nashua 1952	Nasrullah 1940	Mumtaz Begum	Mumtaz Mahal
Sire Nashua 1952	Segula 1942	Johnstown	Jamestown
Sire Nashua 1952	Segula 1942	Johnstown	La France
Sire Nashua 1952	Segula 1942	Sekhmet	Sardanapale
Sire Nashua 1952	Segula 1942	Sekhmet	Prosopopee
Dam San Cat 1963	Barbizon 1954	Polynesian	Unbreakable
Dam San Cat 1963	Barbizon 1954	Polynesian	Black Polly
Dam San Cat 1963	Barbizon 1954	Good Blood	Bull Lea
Dam San Cat 1963	Barbizon 1954	Good Blood	Diagnosis
Dam San Cat 1963	Mrs Cat 1955	Goya	Tourbillon
Dam San Cat 1963	Mrs Cat 1955	Goya	Zariba
Dam San Cat 1963	Mrs Cat 1955	Silver Fog	Mahmoud
Dam San Cat 1963	Mrs Cat 1955	Silver Fog	Equilette
