= Arwon =

New Zealand-bred thoroughbred racehorse

- Sire: Aritzo
- Grandsire: Alcide
- Dam: Fair Flash
- Damsire: Resurgent
- Sex: Gelding
- Foaled: 1973
- Died: 2007
- Country: New Zealand
- Colour: Bay or brown
- Owner: Jack Watson (part)
- Trainer: John Morrissy; George Hanlon
- Record: 67:16-13-5
- Earnings: $339,527

Major wins
- Herbert Power Handicap (1978); Melbourne Cup (1978); Sandown Cup (1980)
- Last updated on 16 October 2017

Arwon (foaled 8 September 1973, died 25 May 2007) was a New Zealand-bred thoroughbred racehorse by Aritzo from Fair Flash who won the 1978 Melbourne Cup.

In New Zealand, he was known and raced as Flash Guy. Arwon won the 1978 Melbourne Cup, beating Dandeleith and Karu by a half neck. He ran in two more Melbourne Cups, finishing ninth in 1980 to Beldale Ball and fifth in 1981 to Just A Dash.

The name 'Arwon' was made from reversing the word Nowra, a town in New South Wales where one of the syndicate that owned him lived.

Arwon was initially trained by John Morrissey in Canberra before being sent to Victorian trainer George Hanlon, who prepared him for his Melbourne Cup victory, where he was ridden by jockey Harry White. He also won the 1980 Group 2 VATC Sandown Cup, now known as the Sandown Classic, and the 1978 VATC Herbert Power Handicap, both run over 2,400 m. Arwon started in 67 races, won 16 starts, was second 13 times and finished third five times.

He was the Melbourne Cup's oldest living winner until he was euthanized in May 2007 at the age of 33.

Until two years before his death, he took part in the annual Melbourne Cup Parade down Swanston Street, held on Cup Eve (Monday).

== Pedigree ==
Pedigree of Arwon
| Sire Aritzo 1968 | Alcide 1955 | Alycidon | Donatello |
| Sire Aritzo 1968 | Alcide 1955 | Alycidon | Aurora |
| Sire Aritzo 1968 | Alcide 1955 | Chenille | King Salmon |
| Sire Aritzo 1968 | Alcide 1955 | Chenille | Sweet Aloe |
| Sire Aritzo 1968 | Caronia 1959 | Petition | Fair Trial |
| Sire Aritzo 1968 | Caronia 1959 | Petition | Art Paper |
| Sire Aritzo 1968 | Caronia 1959 | Ocean Lore | Blue Peter |
| Sire Aritzo 1968 | Caronia 1959 | Ocean Lore | Rosy Legend |
| Dam Fair Flash 1964 | Resurgent 1950 | The Phoenix | Chateau Bouscaut |
| Dam Fair Flash 1964 | Resurgent 1950 | The Phoenix | Fille De Poete |
| Dam Fair Flash 1964 | Resurgent 1950 | Gainsborough Lass | Gainsborough |
| Dam Fair Flash 1964 | Resurgent 1950 | Gainsborough Lass | Golden Hair |
| Dam Fair Flash 1964 | Christmas Fair 1957 | Fairs Fair | Fair Trial |
| Dam Fair Flash 1964 | Christmas Fair 1957 | Fairs Fair | Fairy Godmother |
| Dam Fair Flash 1964 | Christmas Fair 1957 | Revelate | Revelation |
| Dam Fair Flash 1964 | Christmas Fair 1957 | Revelate | Lone Flier |
