= Rainbird (horse) =

Australian Thoroughbred racehorse

- Sire: The Buzzard (GB)
- Grandsire: Spion Kop (IRE)
- Dam: Sequoia (AUS)
- Damsire: Heroic (AUS)
- Sex: Mare
- Foaled: 1941
- Country: Australia
- Colour: Chestnut
- Owner: Clifford Reid
- Trainer: Sam Evans
- Record: 47:8 wins, 7 seconds, 6 thirds
- Earnings: £A 19,418 or AUD 34,836

Major wins
- Wakeful Stakes (1944); Melbourne Cup (1945)
- Last updated on 30 December 2012

Rainbird was an Australian Thoroughbred racehorse who won the 1945 Melbourne Cup.

Ridden by Billy Cook she carried just 7 st 7 lb (48 kg) to victory in the Cup, winning by a margin of 2 1/2 lengths.

== Namesake ==
Australian rail operator CFCL Australia named locomotive CF4407 after the horse.
