= Just a Dash =

Australian Thoroughbred racehorse

Just A Dash (AUS)
- Sire: Whiskey Road (USA)
- Grandsire: Nijinsky (CAN)
- Dam: Native Lass (AUS)
- Damsire: Caranna (AUS)
- Sex: Gelding
- Foaled: 1977
- Died: 2 November 2012 (aged 35)
- Country: Australia
- Colour: Bay
- Breeder: Mr & Mrs I C Woodford-Smith
- Owner: Lloyd Williams George Frew and Tom Pettiona
- Trainer: T. J. Smith
- Record: 61: 10–7–8

Major wins
- Melbourne Cup (1981); Adelaide Cup (1981)
- Last updated on 27 December 2011

Just A Dash (1977 – 2 November 2012) was a notable Australian Thoroughbred racehorse, who won the 1981 Melbourne Cup.

He was sired by Whiskey Road (USA). His dam Native Lass (AUS) was by Caranna (AUS).

The horse won the race by 2 ¼ lengths providing T. J. Smith with just his second Melbourne Cup. He was ridden by Peter Cook whose father Billy Cook had himself ridden two previous winners of the race.

Just A Dash was also victorious in the 1981 SAJC Adelaide Cup and the SAJC St. Leger Stakes.

Leading up to the Cup he had placed:

- 7th in the Herbert Power Handicap behind Flashing Light
- 6th in the Caulfield Cup behind Silver Bounty
- 5th in the Dalgety Handicap behind Mr Cromwell

He was put down at Willow Dene Stud near Wollongong at the age of 35 in late 2012. Until his death, he was the oldest surviving Melbourne Cup winner.
