= Kingston Town (horse) =

Australian-bred Thoroughbred racehorse

- Sire: Bletchingly
- Grandsire: Biscay
- Dam: Ada Hunter (GER)
- Damsire: Andrea Mantegna (FR)
- Sex: Gelding
- Foaled: 1976
- Country: Australia
- Colour: Black
- Breeder: David Hains
- Owner: David Hains & G Monsborough
- Trainer: T. J. Smith
- Jockey: Malcolm Johnston
- Record: 41: 30-5-2
- Earnings: A$1,605,790

Major wins
- Group One; Spring Champion Stakes (1979); Rosehill Guineas (1980); AJC Derby (1980); H E Tancred Stakes (1980); Sydney Cup (1980); Queensland Derby (1980); Warwick Stakes (1980, 1981, 1982); W. S. Cox Plate (1980, 1981, 1982); George Main Stakes (1981, 1982); Caulfield Stakes (1981, 1982); Western Mail Classic (1982)

Awards
- Australian Champion Racehorse of the Year (1980); Timeform rating: 137

Honours
- Australian Racing Hall of Fame; Kingston Town Classic at Ascot Racecourse
- Last updated on 23 October 2009

Kingston Town (31 August 1976 – March 1991) was a champion Australian Thoroughbred racehorse who won three Cox Plates and 11 other Group One races and was the 1980 Australian Champion Racehorse of the Year.

== Background ==
He was by Bletchingly, later a Leading sire in Australia, his dam, Ada Hunter (GER) was by Andrea Mantegna (FR). Ada Hunter was the dam of nine foals, but Private Thoughts (a brother to Kingston Town) was her only other stakes winner. She was later exported to the United States. Kingston Town was bred by David Hains, who sold a share in him to G. Monsborough and his wife after the horse failed to reach his reserve as a yearling.

== Racing career ==
He was trained throughout his career by Tommy Smith and ridden in 25 of his 30 wins by Malcolm Johnston. Kingston Town made his debut as a two-year-old, and, in his only start as a colt, ran last, but returned as a gelding in the final weeks of the season to win the Round Table Handicap at Rosehill at odds of 33/1. This was the beginning of a six-race winning run, which culminated in his first Group One win, the Spring Champion Stakes. Sent to Melbourne, the 'Sydney Champion', as he was dubbed, could only finish third, fourth, and second, respectively, in the Caulfield Guineas, the Caulfield Cup, and the Victoria Derby. The pattern of consistent success in Sydney and mixed fortunes in Melbourne would be repeated throughout his career: Kingston Town won 21 races from as many starts in Sydney between June 1979 and August 1982, interspersed with four trips to Melbourne, where he won five of his 13 starts.

In the autumn of his three-year-old season, Kingston Town won six races in a row, including the Rosehill Guineas, the Tancred Stakes, the AJC Derby, and the Sydney Cup. At the Brisbane winter carnival, he extended his winning run to eight races by winning twice more, including the Queensland Derby. At season's end, his record stood at 14 wins from 18 starts, and he was named Australia's champion racehorse.

The final 23 starts of Kingston Town's career, which produced a further 16 wins, were unusual in that he only raced at the spring carnivals of 1980, 1981, and 1982, and injury prevented him from campaigning at the 1981, 1982, or 1983 autumn carnivals. Each of the three preparations consisted of winning weight-for-age races in Sydney, such as the Warwick Stakes and the George Main Stakes, often against small fields, before racing in Melbourne. In each of the three years, he won the Cox Plate at Moonee Valley, and recorded back-to-back wins in the Caulfield Stakes in 1981 and 1982, but tried and failed to win the Caulfield and Melbourne Cups on multiple occasions. He was third in the 1980 Caulfield Cup, 20th in the 1981 Melbourne Cup, and runner-up in 1982 beaten a neck carrying 59 kg.

Kingston Town won 21 successive stakes races in Sydney - beaten by Winx who retired winning her last 24 starts in succession.

Kingston Town's win in the 1982 Cox Plate was marked by Bill Collins's famously incorrect prognostication that 'Kingston Town can't win', which was hastily revised to '... he might win yet the champ ... Kingston Town's swamping them ... Kingston Town...' According to The Age's Glenn Lester, 'the call is so intricately woven into the "King's" history-making third Cox Plate win that it's difficult to decide which was the most memorable element of the race: the broadcast or the victory itself'. Elsewhere, however, it is described as a 'gaffe', and the replay supports this view in that Kingston Town was within a few lengths of the lead at the time. Greg Miles, however, a well-respected racecaller of longstanding, who was also broadcasting the Cox Plate of 1982, states that he also made the same claim as Collins at almost the same time.

After running his last race in Australia, in November 1982, Kingston Town was sent to America on 15 February 1984 in an attempt to overcome his leg problems, but he did not race in the United States. He was returned to Australia, and, in 1985, an attempt was made to resurrect his career, but he was scratched from his scheduled race and retired.

== Retirement ==
Along with Carbine, Phar Lap, Bernborough, and Tulloch, Kingston Town was one of five inaugural inductees into the Australian Racing Hall of Fame. With 30 wins and seven placings from 41 starts, Kingston Town won $1,605,790 in prize money, and was the first horse in Australia to pass the million-dollar barrier. He was given the extraordinary Timeform Rating of 137 - the second highest of any Australian horse in the period (1950s onward). Kingston Town's rating remains well above those of several Cox Plate winners who have won either or both the Caulfield and Melbourne Cups, including Saintly, Might And Power, Northerly, and Makybe Diva.

In March 1991, Kingston Town was put down after failing to recover from a leg injury that he suffered while playing with another horse, his favourite paddock-mate.

== Pedigree ==
Pedigree of Kingston Town, black gelding, 1976
Sire Bletchingly 1970	Biscay (AUS); 1965	Star Kingdom (IRE) 1946	Stardust (GB)
Sire Bletchingly 1970	Biscay (AUS); 1965	Star Kingdom (IRE) 1946	Impromptu (IRE)
Sire Bletchingly 1970	Biscay (AUS); 1965	Magic Symbol (AUS) 1956	Makarpura (GB)
Sire Bletchingly 1970	Biscay (AUS); 1965	Magic Symbol (AUS) 1956	Magic Wonder (AUS)
Sire Bletchingly 1970	Coogee (GB); 1959	Relic (USA) 1945	War Relic (USA)
Sire Bletchingly 1970	Coogee (GB); 1959	Relic (USA) 1945	Bridal Colors (USA)
Sire Bletchingly 1970	Coogee (GB); 1959	Last Judgement (GB) 1948	Fair Trial (GB)
Sire Bletchingly 1970	Coogee (GB); 1959	Last Judgement (GB) 1948	Faustina (GB)
Dam Ada Hunter (GER) 1970	Andrea Mantegna (FR); 1961	Ribot (GB) 1952	Tenerani (ITY)
Dam Ada Hunter (GER) 1970	Andrea Mantegna (FR); 1961	Ribot (GB) 1952	Romanella (ITY)
Dam Ada Hunter (GER) 1970	Andrea Mantegna (FR); 1961	Angela Rucellai (GB) 1954	Rockefella (GB)
Dam Ada Hunter (GER) 1970	Andrea Mantegna (FR); 1961	Angela Rucellai (GB) 1954	Aristareta (ITY)
Dam Ada Hunter (GER) 1970	Almah (GB); 1957	Alycidon (GB) 1945	Donatello II (FR)
Dam Ada Hunter (GER) 1970	Almah (GB); 1957	Alycidon (GB) 1945	Aurora (GB)
Dam Ada Hunter (GER) 1970	Almah (GB); 1957	Gradisca (FR) 1943	Goya (FR)
Dam Ada Hunter (GER) 1970	Almah (GB); 1957	Gradisca (FR) 1943	Phebe (FR) (family: 12-b)

== See also ==
- List of racehorses
- List of leading Thoroughbred racehorses
- Repeat winners of horse races
