= Peter Cook (jockey) =

Australian jockey

Peter John Cook (born 15 December 1950) in Sydney, Australia is a retired Australian jockey.

Some of his achievements include winning the 1981 Melbourne Cup (Just A Dash) and 1984 Melbourne Cup (Black Knight), the 1976 and 1982 Cox Plates (Surround and Kingston Town), the 1979 Doncaster Handicap (Belmura Lad) and the 1988 Oakleigh Plate (Snippets).

In 1991 he suffered permanent heart damage following an incident whilst using a sauna in the jockeys' room at Canberra racecourse.

He officially retired from riding in 1994 and had a short stint as a trainer.

Peter Cook is often compared to his father, champion jockey Billy Cook.
