= Piping Lane =

Australian-bred Thoroughbred racehorse

- Sire: Lanesborough
- Grandsire: Tamerlane
- Dam: Londonderry Air
- Damsire: Piping Time
- Sex: Gelding
- Foaled: 1 August 1966
- Died: 5 February 1996 (aged 29)
- Country: Australia
- Colour: Bay
- Owner: R. W. Trinder
- Trainer: George Hanlon
- Record: 59: 15-8-11

Major wins
- Hobart Cup (1972); Melbourne Cup (1972); C B Cox Stakes (1972)

Piping Lane (foaled 1966, died 1996) was a brown Australian Thoroughbred racehorse gelding by Lanesborough out of the mare Londonderry Air by Piping Time. Piping Lane came to prominence by winning the 1972 Melbourne Cup over 3,200 metres at odds of 40/1.

Piping Lane was owned by R.E. Prevost of Epping Forest, Tasmania and his racing had been confined to Tasmania, where he had won $12,638, prior to April 1972. He was then purchased for $6,000 by Ray W. Trinder, then 69, and a licensed amateur jockey and also an owner-trainer. Trinder had purchased the horse with the specific aim of winning the Melbourne Cup. Piping Lane was sent to be trained by George Hanlon of Melbourne. He was allotted 48 kg in the cup and with many top jockeys unable to ride at this weight John Letts of Adelaide South Australia was given the ride. John Letts had not ridden on the Flemington course before and had stated "We're only here to make up the numbers" regarding his chances of winning. Thus Piping Lane became only the third Tasmanian bred horse to win the Melbourne Cup after Malua and Sheet Anchor. The very good racehorse Gunsynd ran third.

Piping Lane's other significant wins included the 1972 C B Cox Stakes and the 1972 Hobart Cup.
