= Billy Cook (jockey) =

Australian jockey (1910–1985)

William Henry Cook (12 January 1910 – 29 January 1985) was an Australian jockey.

== Career ==
Billy earned the nickname "Last-Race Cookie" following his riding of the winner in the last race 13 Saturdays in succession in Sydney. He was also known as "The Champ", due to his exquisite riding skills.

He won six Sydney jockeys' premierships during a distinguished career riding in Australia and overseas.

Some of the achievements during his career included winning the 1941 and 1945 Melbourne Cups (Skipton and Rainbird), the 1930 Caulfield Cup (Amounis), the 1953 Sydney Cup (Carioca), and the 1954 CB Fisher Plate (Rising Fast).

Perhaps his most famous victory was defeating Phar Lap on Mollison in the 1929 Chelmsford Stakes.

== Retirement ==
He officially retired from riding in 1959. His son Peter was also a successful jockey.

== Death ==
Cook died in 1985 and was posthumously inducted in the Australian Racing Hall of Fame in 2002.
