= Malcolm Johnston (jockey) =

Australian jockey

Personal information
- Nickname: Miracle
- Born: 19 October 1956 (age 69) Parramatta, New South Wales, Australia
- Occupation: Jockey

Horse racing career
- Sport: Horse racing
- Career wins: 2,000 +

Honours
- Australian Racing Hall of Fame

Significant horses
- Kingston Town

Malcolm Johnston (born 19 October 1956) is a retired Australian jockey.

Johnston was raised in the rural town of Forbes, New South Wales. He went to Sydney, as an apprentice jockey underneath trainer Theo Green, riding his first winner in Sydney at Rosehill in 1973.

Johnston would go on to win three Sydney apprentice premierships, as well as winning the overall jockeys title when still an apprentice, riding 107.5 winners in the 1975–76 season. He won a further two jockeys premierships in 1977–78, and 1986–87.

Johnston is most renowned for his association with the horse Kingston Town which he rode in 25 of the horse's 30 victories.

Johnston retired in 1993, having ridden over 2,000 winners, including 37 at Group One level.

In 2018, Johnston was inducted into the Australian Racing Hall of Fame.
