= John Letts (jockey) =

Australian jockey

Personal information
- Full name: John Richard Letts
- Born: 28 July 1943 (age 83) Adelaide, South Australia, Australia

Horse racing career
- Sport: Horse racing
- Career wins: 2,350

Honours
- Australian Racing Hall of Fame (2010); John Letts Cup (2021– ) Morphettville
- Updated on 30 October 2021

John Richard "Johnny" Letts (born 28 July 1943) is an Australian former jockey whose career spanned almost 30 years, retiring from race riding in 1988.

Letts began riding as an apprentice in 1959, aged 16 years old and eventually rode over 2,300 winners.

Letts was immortalized by winning the Melbourne Cup twice on Piping Lane in 1972 and Beldale Ball in 1980.

Apart from his Melbourne Cup successes Letts rode a host of big race winners including:

- a record five wins in The Goodwood (1961, 1972, 1973, 1977, 1984)
- three SAJC Adelaide Cups on Rain Lover (1968), Grand Scale (1976) and Amarant (1983).
- the 1977 AJC Epsom Handicap on Raffindale,
- the 1975 Victoria Derby on Galena Boy
- the 1980 VRC Australian Cup on Ming Dynasty.

In recent years, Letts has been prominent as a mounted interviewer for 7 Sport's TV coverage of major races in Australia, including the Melbourne Cup. Riding on the course on board his best mate Banjo, immediately after a race finishes, he uses a hand-held microphone to do live interviews with the winning jockey within seconds of the finish of the race. Visual coverage is from trackside cameras.

In Adelaide, Letts had the reputational nickname "The Punters Pal".

In late 2014, Letts was given the all clear after a battle with cancer.

In April 2015, Letts lost his best friend Banjo, who died from colic aged 25. In March 2016 the Galaxy Stakes on Golden Slipper Day at Rosehill was renamed The Banjo Galaxy Stakes in honour of Letts's old mate on the track.
