= Lexus Archer Stakes =

Lexus Archer Stakes registered as the Hotham Handicap
- Class: Group 3
- Location: Flemington Racecourse, Melbourne, Australia
- Inaugurated: 1869
- Race type: Thoroughbred
- Sponsor: Lexus (2025 & 2026)

Race information
- Distance: 2,500 metres
- Surface: Turf
- Qualification: Three year olds and older that are not maidens
- Weight: Quality handicap
- Purse: $300,000 (2026)
- Bonuses: Exemption from ballot for Melbourne Cup (if nominated)

The Hotham Handicap, raced as the Lexus Archer Stakes, is a Victoria Racing Club Group 3 Thoroughbred horse race for horses three years old and older, held under quality handicap conditions, over a distance of 2500 metres, held annually at Flemington Racecourse, Melbourne, Australia on Makybe Diva Stakes Day.

== History ==
Historically the race has been a traditional lead-up for the Melbourne Cup three days later, with the winner gaining exemption from any ballot for entry to the Cup.

As a "Quality Race", the weights are assigned as in a handicap, but with a maximum weight of 60 kg and a minimum weight of 52 kg.

The race is also famous due to a triple dead-heat in 1956 involving Fighting Force, Ark Royal and Pandie Sun.

From 2024, the VRC moved the race from Victoria Derby day to Makybe Diva Stakes day in September.

=== Name ===
- 1869–1978 - Hotham Handicap
- 1979–1993 - The Dalgety
- 1994–1995 - Crown Quality
- 1996 - Ten News Stakes
- 1997 - Lean Cuisine Quality
- 1998–2008 - Saab Quality
- 2009–2018 - Lexus Stakes
- 2019–2021 - Lexus Hotham Stakes
- 2022–present - Lexus Archer Stakes

=== Distance ===
- 1869–1971 - 1 1/2 miles (~2400 metres)
- 1972 onwards - 2500 metres

=== Grade ===
- 1869–1978 - Principal Race
- 1979–1980 - Group 3
- 1981–2003 - Group 2
- 2004 onwards - Group 3

=== Doubles wins ===
The following horses have won this race and the Melbourne Cup in the same year.

Shocking (2009), Brew (2000), Think Big (1974), Baystone (1958), Foxzami (1949), Sirius (1944), Dark Felt (1943), White Nose (1931), King Ingoda (1922) and Nimblefoot (1870).

=== 1953 and 1954 racebooks ===
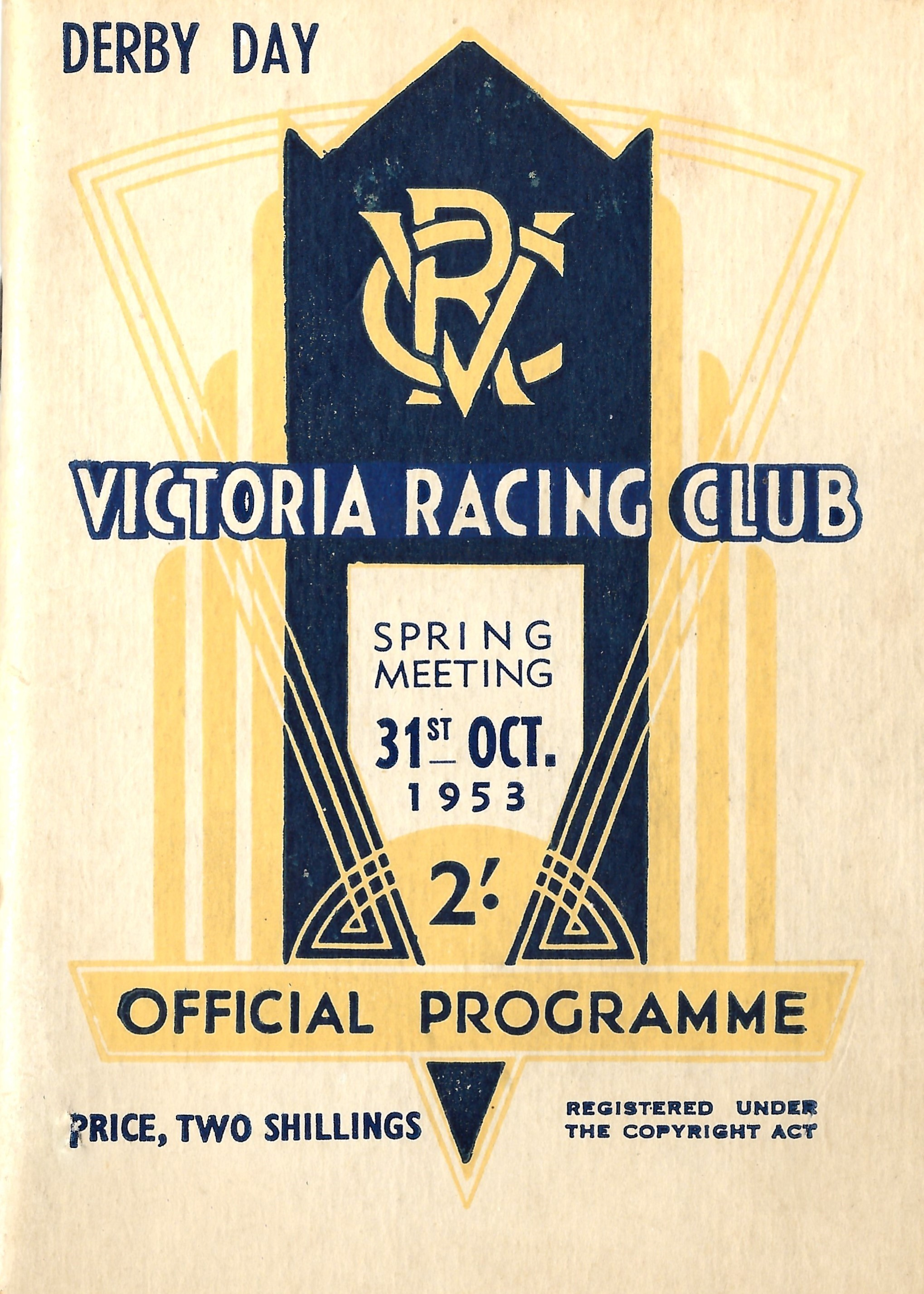
1953 VRC Derby racebook front cover

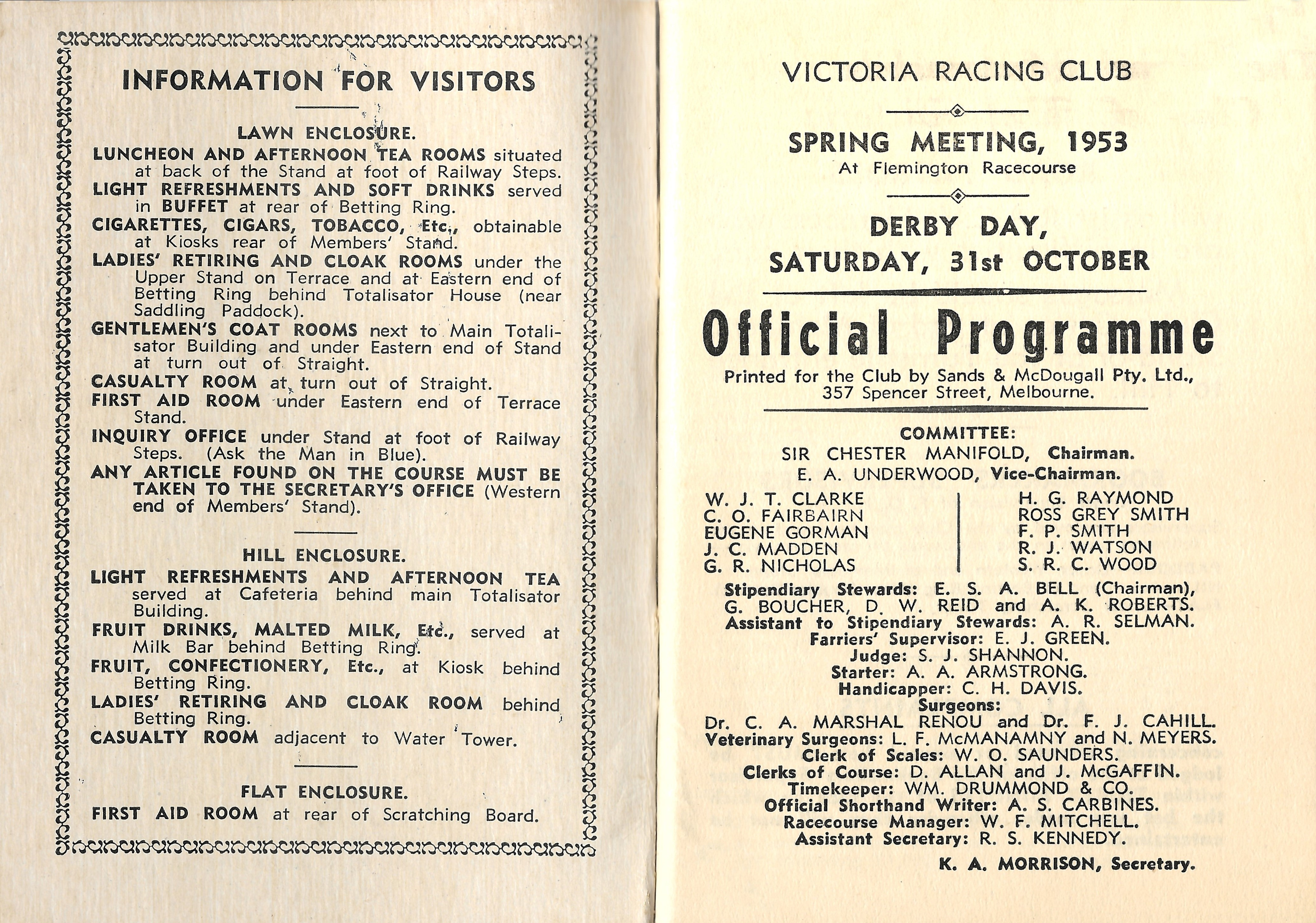
1953 VRC Derby raceday officials

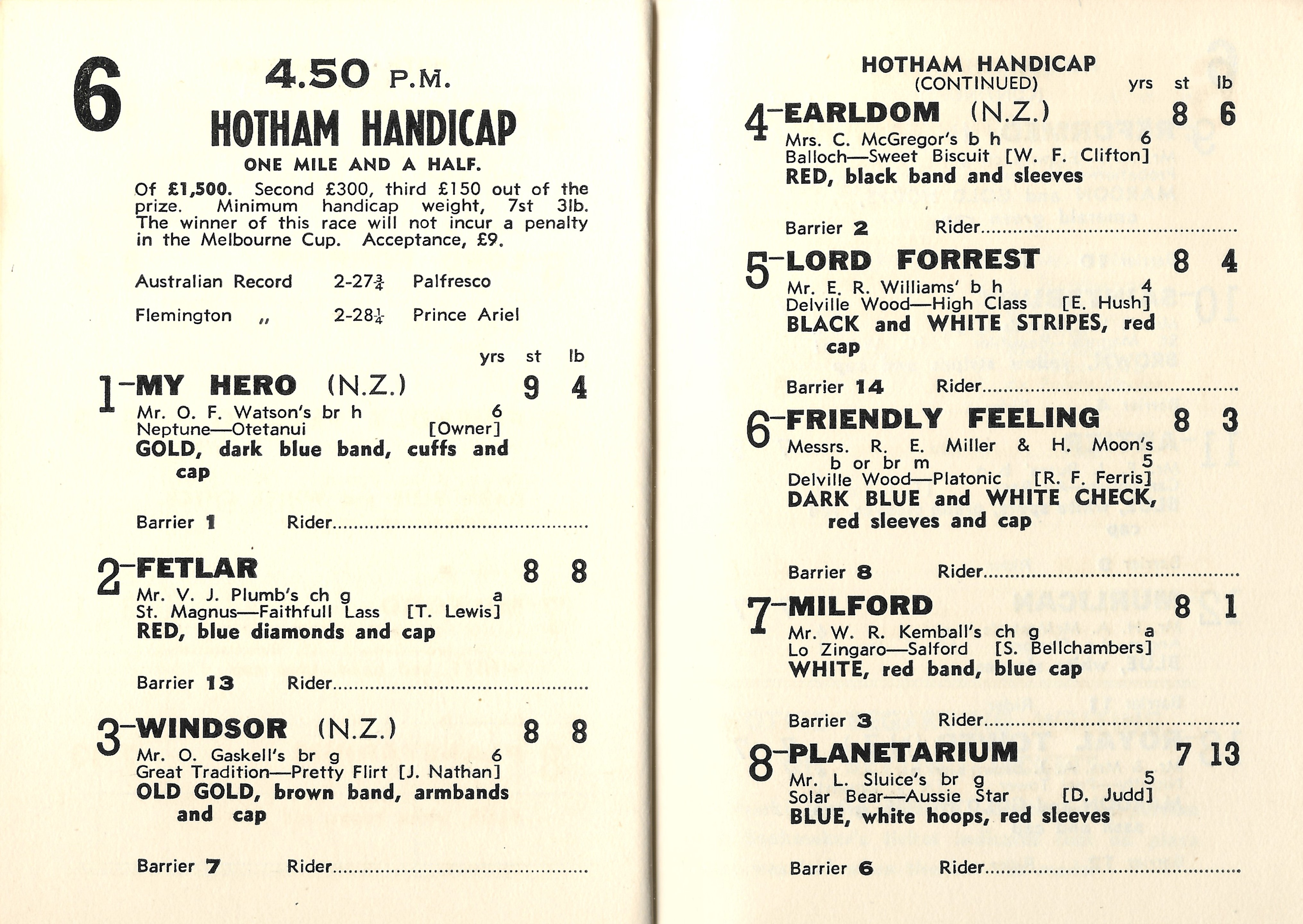
1953 VRC Hotham Handicap page showing the winner, My Hero

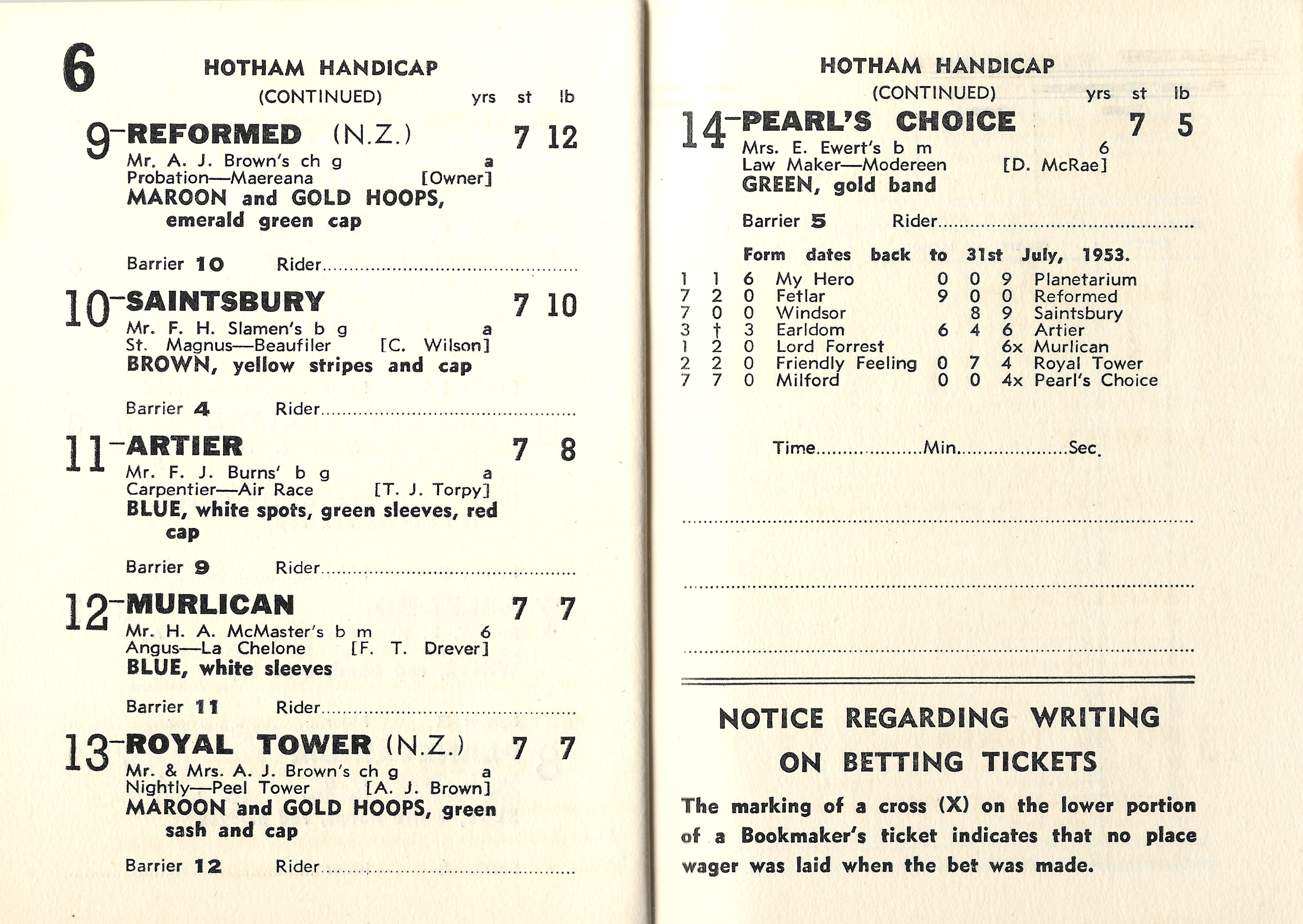
1953 VRC Hotham Handicap page starters and results

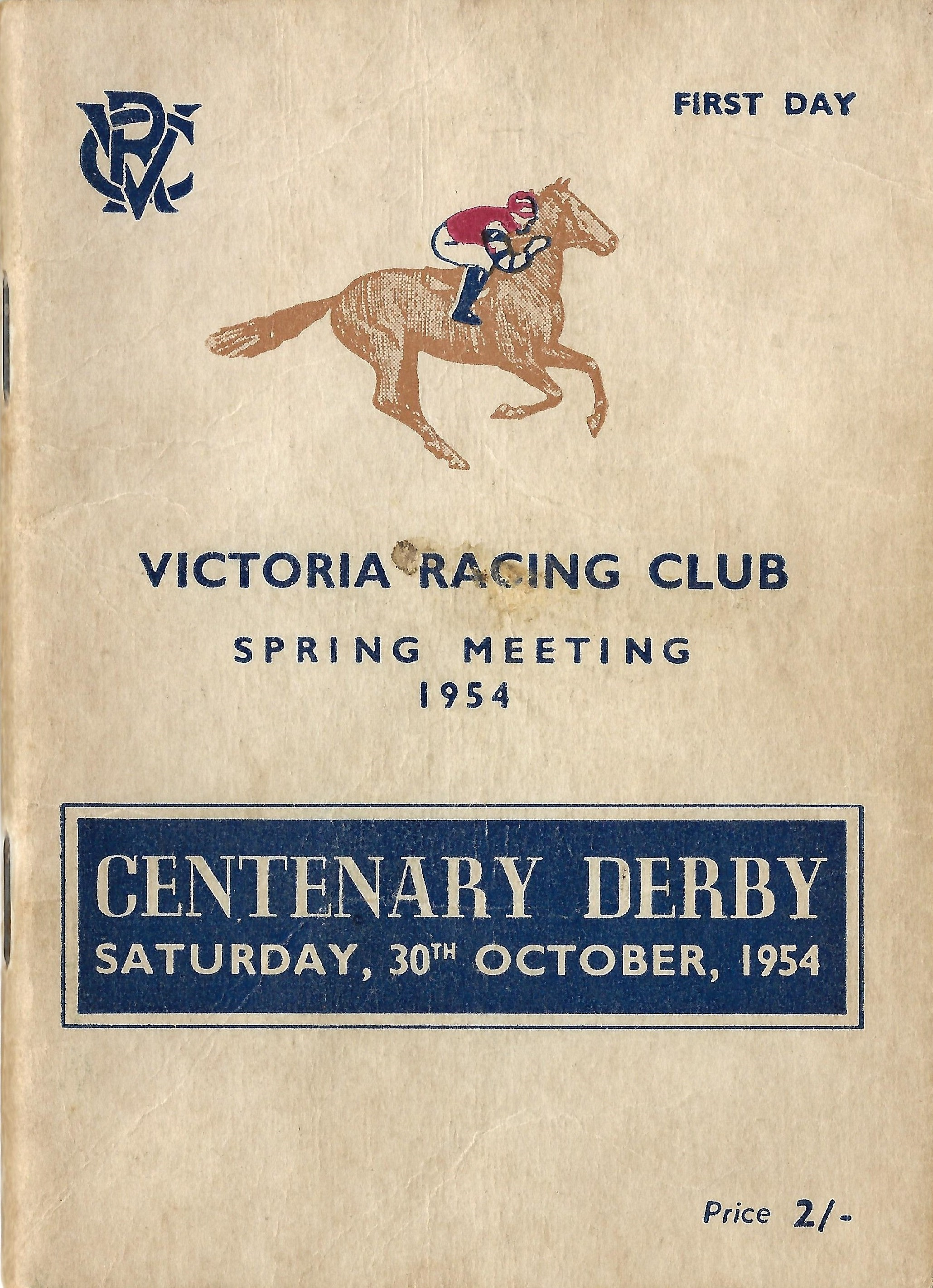
1954 VRC Derby racebook front cover

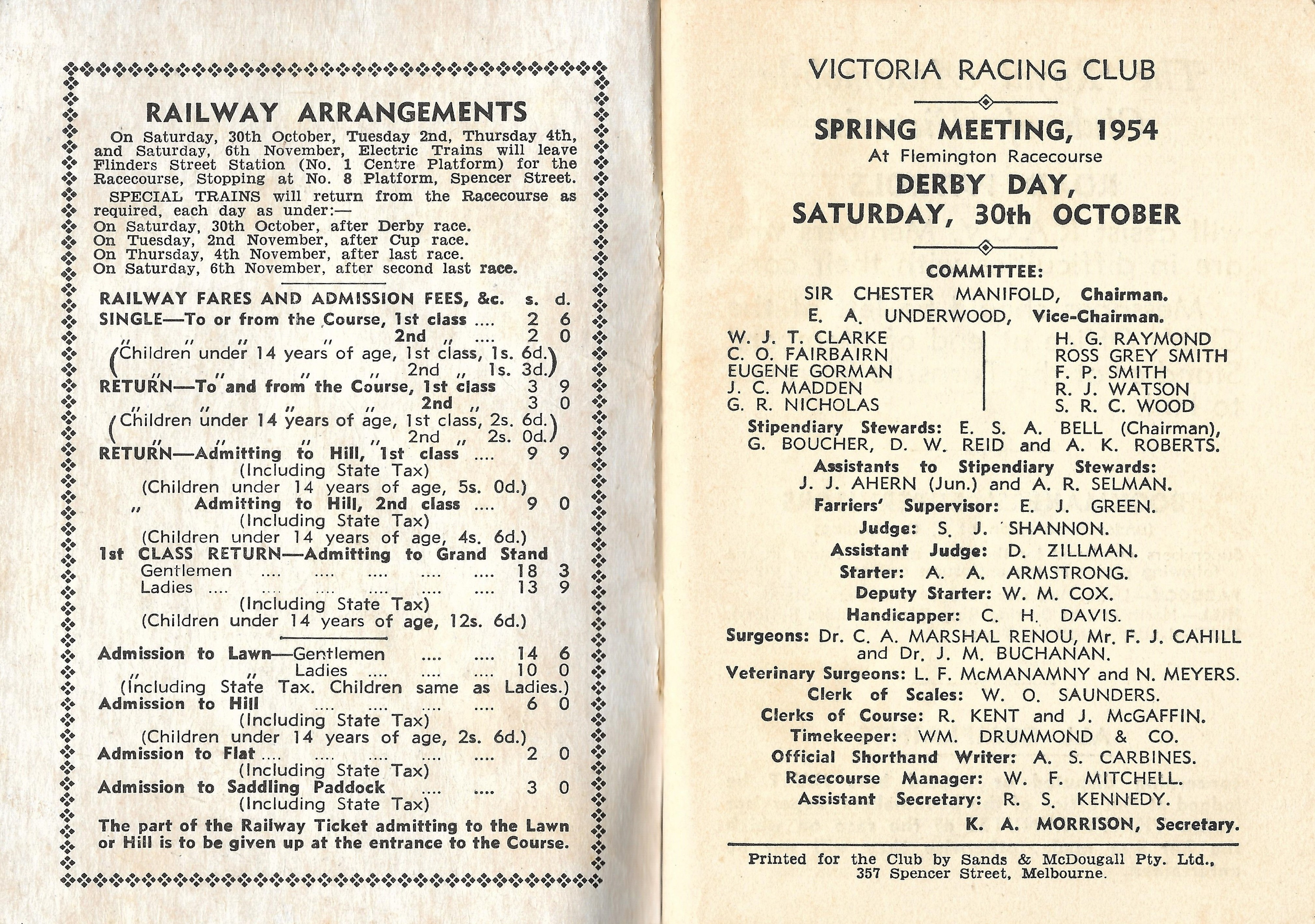
1954 VRC Derby raceday officials

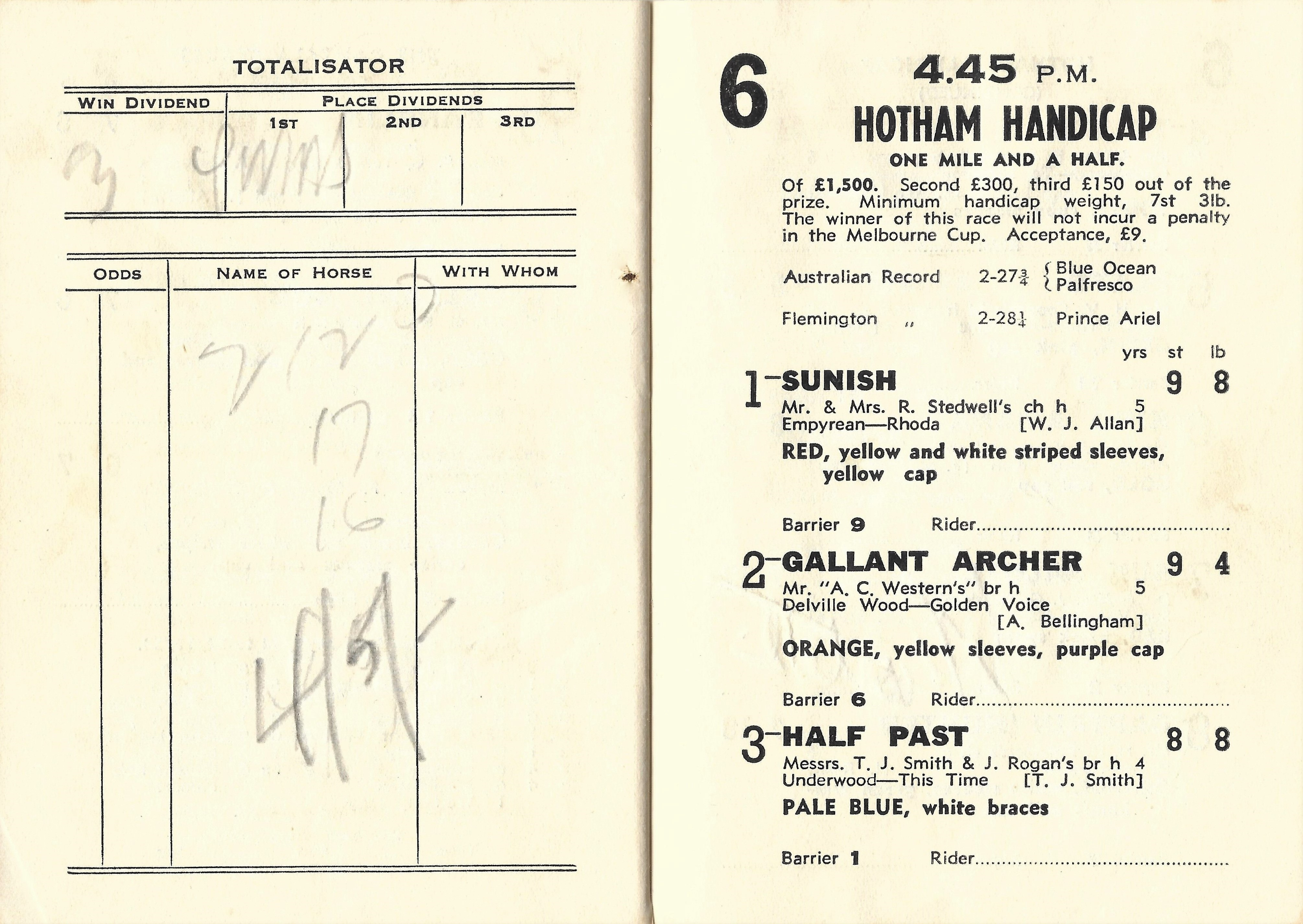
1954 VRC Hotham Handicap page starters and results

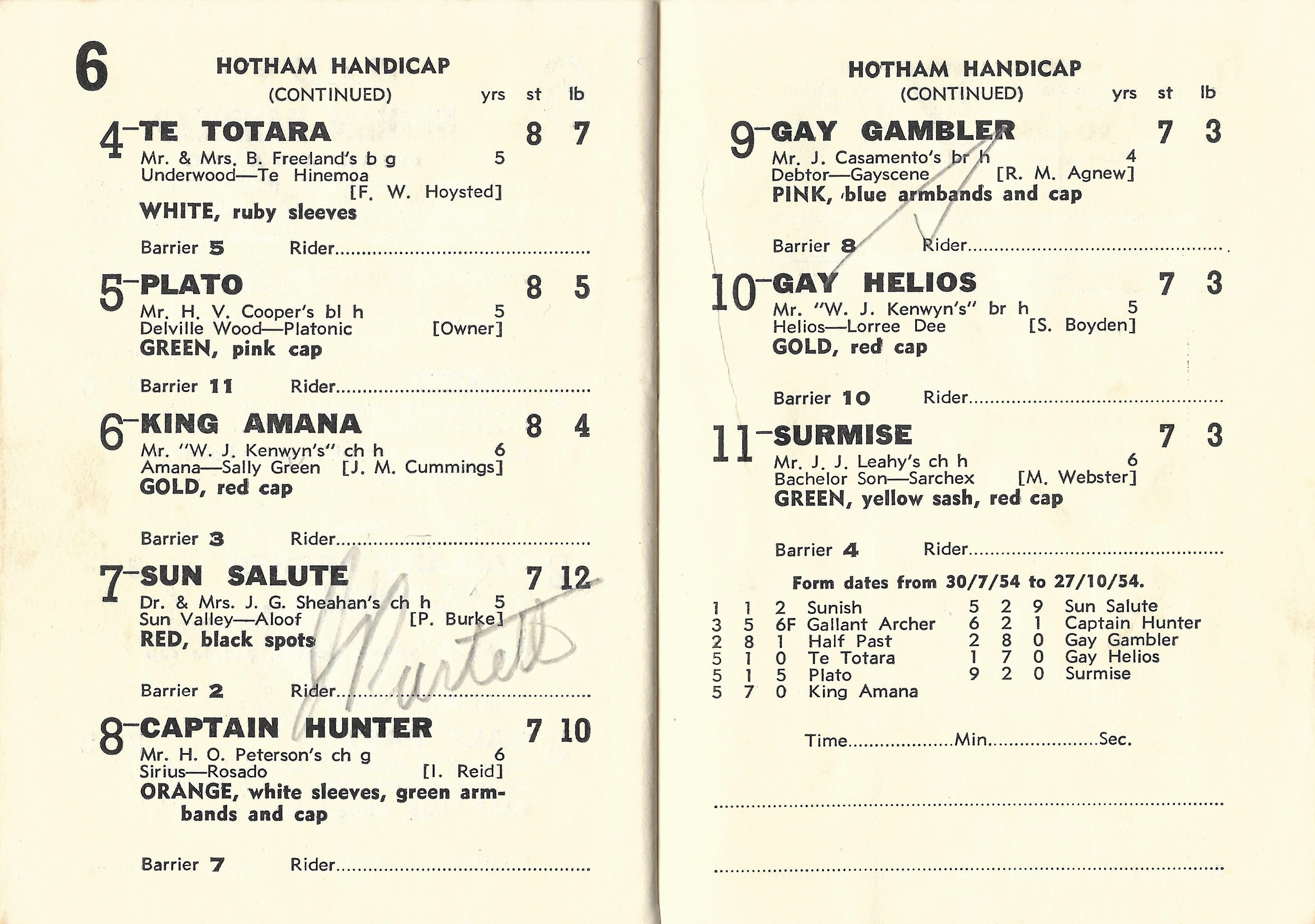
1954 VRC Hotham Handicap page showing the winner, Plato

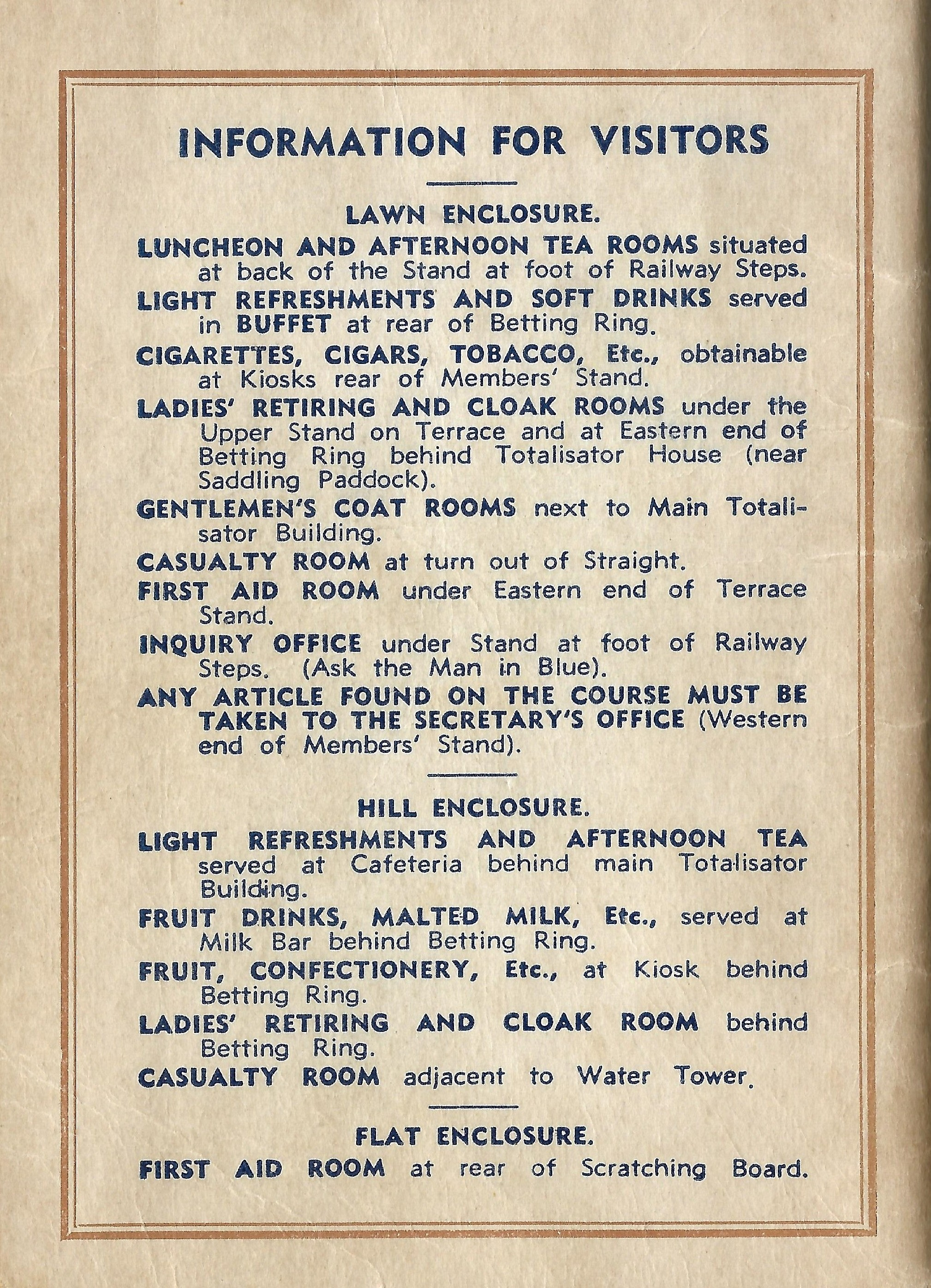
Back cover showing enclosure information for visitors

== Winners ==
The following are past winners of the race.

- 2026 - Shockletz
- 2025 - Revelare
- 2024 - Point King
- 2023 - Kalapour
- 2022 - Surefire
- 2021 - Great House
- 2020 - Ashrun
- 2019 - Downdraft
- 2018 - Prince Of Arran
- 2017 - Cismontane
- 2016 - Oceanographer
- 2015 - Excess Knowledge
- 2014 - Signoff
- 2013 - Ruscello
- 2012 - Kelinni
- 2011 - Niwot
- 2010 - Maluckyday
- 2009 - Shocking
- 2008 - Moatize
- 2007 - Sculptor
- 2006 - Maybe Better
- 2005 - Strasbourg
- 2004 - Don Raphael
- 2003 - Big Pat
- 2002 - Requiem
- 2001 - Maythehorsebewithu
- 2000 - Brew
- 1999 - The Warrior
- 1998 - Star Binder
- 1997 - Backslapper
- 1996 - Few Are Chosen
- 1995 - Coachwood
- 1994 - Pindi
- 1993 - Tennessee Jack
- 1992 - Big Barron
- 1991 - Rasheek
- 1990 - Mount Olympus
- 1989 - Coshking
- 1988 - Copatonic
- 1987 - Scarvila
- 1986 - Sea Legend
- 1985 - Silver Award
- 1984 - Chagemar
- 1983 - Chagemar
- 1982 - Allez Bijou
- 1981 - Mr. Cromwell
- 1980 - Bohemian Grove
- 1979 - Karu
- 1978 - Jury
- 1977 - Major Till
- 1976 - Reckless
- 1975 - Suleiman
- 1974 - Think Big
- 1973 - Daneson
- 1972 - Scotch And Dry
- 1971 - Not Again
- 1970 - Sudani
- 1969 - Tails
- 1968 - Raad
- 1967 - Midlander
- 1966 - Aveniam
- 1965 - Sail Away
- 1964 - Celero
- 1963 - River Seine
- 1962 - Le Storm
- 1961 - Oreka
- 1960 - Nilarco
- 1959 - Grand Garry
- 1958 - Baystone
- 1957 - Baron Boissier
- 1956 - † Fighting Force / Ark Royal / Pandie Sun
- 1955 - Better Boy
- 1954 - Plato
- 1953 - My Hero
- 1952 - Morse Code
- 1951 - Glenvue
- 1950 - Thracian Lad
- 1949 - Foxzami
- 1948 - Howe
- 1947 - Dark Marne
- 1946 - Chaytor
- 1945 - Arduli
- 1944 - Sirius
- 1943 - Dark Felt
- 1942 - Dark Felt
- 1941 - Son Of Aurous
- 1940 - Dashing Cavalier
- 1939 - Catalogue
- 1938 - Spear Chief
- 1937 - Frill Prince
- 1936 - Balkan Prince
- 1935 - Sarcherie
- 1934 - Panto
- 1933 - Pretzel
- 1932 - Roc
- 1931 - White Nose
- 1930 - Cimbrian
- 1929 - Shadow King
- 1928 - Epilogue
- 1927 - † Eridanus / Bicolor
- 1926 - Beedos
- 1925 - King Of Mirth
- 1924 - Lilypond
- 1923 - Englefield
- 1922 - King Ingoda
- 1921 - Wirriway
- 1920 - Luteplayer
- 1919 - Sea Bound
- 1918 - Court Jester
- 1917 - Lingle
- 1916 - Dame Quickly
- 1915 - Hush Money
- 1914 - Uncle Matt
- 1913 - Gladwyn
- 1912 - Lord Alwyne
- 1911 - Prizefighter
- 1910 - Flavian
- 1909 - Footpad
- 1908 - Moani
- 1907 - Tulkeroo
- 1906 - Invergordon
- 1905 - Demas
- 1904 - Elvo
- 1903 - Martyr
- 1902 - Sojourner
- 1901 - Ohio
- 1900 - War God
- 1899 - Miss Carbine
- 1898 - Plutus
- 1897 - Metford
- 1896 - Mischief
- 1895 - The Trier
- 1894 - Foxtail
- 1893 - Straightfire
- 1892 - Hopetoun
- 1891 - Pigeontoe
- 1890 - Grey Gown
- 1889 - Meteor
- 1888 - Mara
- 1887 - The Levite
- 1886 - Claptrap
- 1885 - Lesbia
- 1884 - Favo
- 1883 - Wallangra
- 1882 - Odd Trick
- 1881 - Saunterer
- 1880 - Wellington
- 1879 - Trump Yoss
- 1878 - Levant
- 1877 - The Vagabond
- 1876 - Troy
- 1875 - Kinchrachrie
- 1874 - Newbold
- 1873 - Imperial
- 1872 - Early Morn
- 1871 - Saladin
- 1870 - Nimblefoot
- 1869 - Aurora

† Dead heat

== See also ==
- Bobbie Lewis Quality
- Let's Elope Stakes
- Makybe Diva Stakes
- List of Australian Group races
- Group races
