= Tommy J. Smith =

Australian horse trainer (1916–1998)

Tommy J. Smith MBE
- Full name: Thomas John Smith
- Other names: T. J. Smith
- Occupation: Thoroughbred horse trainer
- Born: 3 September 1916; Jembaicumbene, New South Wales, Australia
- Died: 2 September 1998 (aged 81); Sydney, New South Wales, Australia
- Nationality: Australian
- Children: Gai Waterhouse

Honours
- Australian Racing Hall of Fame

Thomas John Smith MBE (3 September 1916 – 2 September 1998) was a leading trainer of thoroughbred racehorses based in Sydney, New South Wales.

Inducted into the Australian Racing Museum & Hall of Fame in 2001 and elevated to Legend status in 2012, Smith dominated Sydney racing for over three decades, winning the Sydney Trainers' Premiership every year between 1953 and 1985. His notable feats as a horse trainer included two Melbourne Cups, four Caulfield Cups, seven W. S. Cox Plates, six Golden Slippers and thirty five Australian derbies. Notable horses trained by Smith included Tulloch, Gunsynd, Kingston Town, Redcraze and Red Anchor.

== Early days ==
Born in Jembaicumbene, New South Wales (near Braidwood, New South Wales) and raised at the small town of Goolgowi in the Riverina district of New South Wales, young Tommy worked with his father driving bullock teams and breaking in horses. When Tommy looked back on his life, he always recalled with regret his lack of formal education.

Smith yearned to be a famous jockey and as a youth won many races for his father at the picnic races. Smith rode as a jockey until he was age 20, but he was never very good. When weight became a problem he took to hurdle racing, but a bad fall and broken hip ended his riding career.

== Training career ==
Smith became a trainer, acquiring his licence in 1941. His first success came in 1942 with Bragger a rogue horse he bought from Wagga property owner Mack Sawyer. He broke in the horse, and named him using his own nickname. Smith also registered racing silks of green and blue vertical stripes, which were to become famous in later years as the colours of Tulloch Lodge horses. He rented horse boxes in Kensington, housing Bragger in one box, while he lived in the other. According to Bill Whittaker, Smith won the nomination fee for Bragger by winning at two-up. Bragger won 13 races including Smith's first Group 1 winner in the 1946 Railway Quality, establishing him as a Sydney trainer and Smith won a significant amount of money backing Bragger to win races. But when Bragger went for a spell, Smith blew all of his winnings on flashy suits, hired cars and drinking. Almost broke, Smith was saved when Bragger returned from his spell and won. After this episode Smith never went broke again. Bragger continued to win races until he was a ten-year-old, when he had to be destroyed after becoming caught in a float fire on his way home from a race meeting.

Smith's reputation as an emerging trainer was further enhanced with the success of Playboy, which he also owned, in the 1949 AJC Derby. Playboy started at 100/1 and was heavily backed by Smith earning the trainer a large sum of money.

In December 1950 Smith was disqualified from training for five years for not taking sufficient precautions to prevent one of his two-year-olds from being drugged and giving false evidence at a subsequent hearing. Smith appealed the sentence and in January 1951 the Australian Jockey Club (AJC) upheld the appeal and instead chose to issue a "severe reprimand".

At the 1956 New Zealand National Sales Smith bought a Khorassan colt for 750 guineas. He had difficulty in placing the horse with an owner, but eventually persuaded E. A. Haley to take him. The horse was Tulloch, that was to become regarded as one of the three finest racehorses in Australian racing history.

=== Years of success ===
Smith won the first of 33 successive Sydney training premierships in 1953 and began to win races outside of Sydney. In 1955, he won Australia richest race, the Melbourne Cup, with Toparoa, defeating the champion Rising Fast. During the 1950s Smith trained a number of high class horses including Redcraze and the exceptional Tulloch whose feature race wins including the 1957 Caulfield Cup and 1960 W. S. Cox Plate.

Smith went on to win a second Melbourne Cup with Just A Dash in 1981.

=== Training methods ===
Smith was known for keeping his horses very fit using what was called the "bone and muscle" method. According to his longtime veterinarian Percy Sykes, Smith rarely changed his training methods and kept his horses work consistent. Sykes also claims Smith was a leader in equine nutritional development, in particular the use of protein in feed. Smith employed many long-term staff, including his brother, Ernie, and Sykes. Bob Thomsen, who later had his own successful training career, was stable foreman at Tulloch Lodge for nine years.

=== Trainers premierships and feature race wins ===
In 1952–1953, Smith won the Sydney Trainers Premiership for the first time, beating rival trainer Maurice McCarten. Smith went on to win the Sydney Trainers Premiership for thirty-three consecutive years before coming second to Brian Mayfield-Smith in the 1985-86 racing season. Smith won the training premiership again in 1987–88.

Smith won many feature races during his career including the Chelmsford Stakes on sixteen occasions (a world record for a group race). He also trained winners in many of Australia's richest races including two Melbourne Cups (Toparoa and Just a Dash), four Caulfield Cups, seven W. S. Cox Plates, six Golden Slippers, and thirty-five derby winners across Australia. In all Smith trained 246 Group One winners.

=== Well-known horses trained by Smith ===
During his long career Tommy trained many champions, such as Redcraze (1956 Caulfield Cup, 1957 W. S. Cox Plate), Gunsynd (1972 W. S. Cox Plate and Doncaster Handicap), Kingston Town (1980, 1981 and 1982 W. S. Cox Plates) and Tulloch (1957 Caulfield Cup, 1960 W. S. Cox Plate).

Following a brilliant season as a three-year-old, Tulloch contracted a virus which kept him from the racecourse for two years. Through Smith's care and perseverance and the work of his vet, Sykes, they brought Tulloch back from near death. Tulloch went on to win 36 of his 53 race starts and set race records for the W. S. Cox Plate and Caulfield Cup. In winning the 1957 AJC Derby he took two seconds off the race record set by Phar Lap. In honour of his champion, Smith named his main stables Tulloch Lodge.

In the late 1970s and early 1980s Smith trained Kingston Town to multiple stakes victories including the W. S. Cox Plate (regarded as Australia's premier Weight-For-Age race) three times in a row. Kingston Town had a formidable record in Sydney winning 21 races in a row on Sydney tracks and won group races from 1,200 metres (3,900 ft)-3,200 metres (10,500 ft). Kingston Town was inducted into the Australian Racing Hall of Fame in 2001.

Smith also trained six winners of Australia's richest and most prestigious two-year-old race, The Golden Slipper. He was the first person to breed, own and train a Golden Slipper winner, being the filly Bounding Away. Smith's secondary stables were named Bounding Away Stables in her honour. As with Tulloch Lodge, these stables are now used by Smith's daughter Gai Waterhouse.

== Retirement ==
Smith's daughter Gai Waterhouse, took out a trainer's licence following a long-running dispute with racing authorities caused by her marriage to warned off bookmaker Robbie Waterhouse. While Smith continued to train horses with reduced numbers, Waterhouse took over the running of Tulloch Lodge in 1994. Waterhouse retained many of the methods pioneered by her father including the "bone and muscle" method. Waterhouse has gone on to win five Sydney Training Premierships and trained numerous group winners. Waterhouse's main stable is still called Tulloch Lodge and the term is sometimes used to describe the Smith/Waterhouse dynasty as a whole. Smith died in 1998, in Sydney, the day before what would have been his 82nd birthday.

== Honours ==
Along with Bart Cummings and Colin Hayes, he is considered to be one of the great Australian thoroughbred trainers.

The TJ Smith Stakes at Randwick Racecourse in Sydney was named in his honour.

In 1982, Smith was appointed a Member of the Order of the British Empire for his services to the community.
