= Colin Hayes =

Australian horse trainer (1924–1999)

Colin Hayes AM OBE
- Full name: Colin Sidney Hayes
- Occupation: Thoroughbred racehorse trainer
- Born: 16 February 1924; Semaphore, South Australia
- Died: 21 May 1999 (aged 75); Angaston, South Australia

Colin Sidney Hayes AM OBE (16 February 1924 – 21 May 1999) was an Australian champion trainer of thoroughbred racehorses based in Adelaide, South Australia.

During his career he trained 5,333 winners including 524 individual Group or Listed winners. He won 28 Adelaide and 13 Melbourne Trainers' Premierships.

The C S Hayes Stakes is named in his honour and run annually at Flemington Racecourse.

Hayes was elevated to Legend status in the Australian Racing Hall of Fame in 2018, a feat only achieved by two other horse trainers, TJ Smith and Bart Cummings.

== Early days ==
Hayes was born in Semaphore, South Australia on 16 February 1924. His father died when Hayes was 10 years old. On leaving school he gained employment with the South Australian Electricity Trust as a boilermaker, but his love of horses soon led him to purchase a steeplechaser named Surefoot, for £9. As an amateur rider, Hayes rode Surefoot himself, with his best result being a third in the 1948 Great Eastern Steeplechase run at Oakbank.

Popular legend has it that Hayes bet his honeymoon money on Surefoot, which ran third at odds of 60/1, enabling him to recoup the money and a little profit. His wife Betty was apparently very angry about the incident at the time.

His son David followed in his footsteps and is a horse trainer. His other son was also a trainer, but Peter Hayes, who at the time was training Fields Of Omagh, died in an airplane crash in 2001.

== Initial success ==
Hayes's initial moderate success with Surefoot drove him to expand his operations and he set up stables called 'Surefoot Lodge' at Semaphore. He won his first Adelaide trainers' premiership in 1956 but decided he wanted to expand his operations into breeding winners as well.

Hayes chose a place in the Barossa Valley approximately 80 kilometres north-east of Adelaide, with many people saying it was too far out of the metropolitan area to succeed.

A syndicate of people was formed to purchase the property known as Lindsay Park, an 800-hectare property of very rich pasture land and superb paddocks. The centrepiece of the property is a magnificent 38-room mansion built in 1840 by George Fife Angas from sandstone and marble quarried on the property.

In making the move Hayes lost several owners and promising horses, reducing his stable from 40 to 16 horses.

He officially began training there on 1 August 1970 and over the next 29 years created one of the most successful breeding and training establishments in the world.

A sign of his success is the world record 10 individual winners in a day, a feat he achieved on 23 January 1982.

== Major wins ==
Amongst the many thousands of races won by Hayes and his horses were the following major race wins:

VRC Melbourne Cup

- 1980 Beldale Ball
- 1986 At Talaq

VATC Caulfield Cup

- 1976 How Now

MVRC W.S.Cox Plate

- 1978 So Called
- 1979 Dulcify
- 1989 Almaarad

STC Golden Slipper Stakes

- 1985 Rory's Jester

VRC Newmarket Handicap

- 1977 Desirable
- 1985 Red Tempo
- 1988 Special
- 1989 Grandiose

VRC Australian Cup

- 1974 Bush Win
- 1979 Dulcify

VRC Derby

- 1974 Haymaker
- 1976 Unaware
- 1978 Dulcify
- 1988 King's High

AJC Derby

- 1979 Dulcify
- 1981 Our Paddy Boy

SAJC Adelaide Cup

- 1962 Cheong Sam
- 1972 Wine Taster
- 1980 Yashmak
- 1990 Water Boatman

== Breeding ==
Hayes also played a major role in the Australian breeding industry by standing quality stallions such as Romantic, Without Fear and Godswalk.

Some of the horses he trained also went on to highly successful stud careers including Rory's Jester, At Talaq and Zabeel.
