= Harry White (jockey) =

Australian jockey (1944–2022)

Personal information
- Born: 1944 Melbourne, Victoria, Australia
- Died: 21 October 2022 (aged 78)
- Occupation: Jockey

Horse racing career
- Sport: Horse racing
- Career wins: 2,112 career wins; 60 Group 1 wins; ~200 Feature race wins

Racing awards
- 4 × Melbourne Cup

Honours
- Australian Racing Hall of Fame inductee

Significant horses
- Think Big; Hyperno; Arwon; Sobar; Ming Dynasty; Rubiton

Harry White (1944 – 21 October 2022) was an Australian jockey. He was one of the country's leading jockeys, especially in the 1970s, and was a four-time winner of the Melbourne Cup. He also won three Newmarket Handicaps, three Oakleigh Plates and three Futurity Stakes.

== Early life ==
White was born in Melbourne, Victoria, in 1944. His father was also a jockey who won the Caulfield Cup in 1943. White was brought up by his grandparents and started working on riding track when he was a young teenager. His apprenticeship contract was revoked after he committed vandalism, but it was eventually reinstated after one year. He won his first race at the Braybrook Handicap held at Flemington Racecourse in July 1959.

== Career ==
White usually rode for the "cups king" Bart Cummings, George Hanlon, and Angus Armanasco. He rode the winners of four Melbourne Cups – on Think Big (1974 and 1975) and Hyperno for Cummings (1979), as well as on Arwon for Hanlon in 1978. He tied Bobbie Lewis for most victories in that race.

White was renowned for his judgment in long-distance events, and for sleeping in the jockeys' room before riding in a race, regardless of how important it was. He was also noted for preferring to use his hands rather than the whip, especially during the latter part of a race. His record in sprint races includes wins in three Newmarket Handicaps, three Oakleigh Plates and three Futurity Stakes. White also won the 1987 W. S. Cox Plate on Rubiton.

Throughout his 35-year career, White registered 2,112 race wins, 60 Group 1 wins, and approximately 200 feature race wins. He was inducted into the Australian Racing Hall of Fame in 2003.

== Personal life ==
White was married to Lauris White for over 40 years, until her death from emphysema in January 2011. Together, they had three children: Karen, Dean, and Brent. After retiring in 1995, White resided with his family on a 200-hectare beef farm near Gisborne in Victoria. Two of his horses – Think Big and Hyperno – were buried there. He ultimately sold the farm around the time of his wife's death.

White went blind in his left eye after falling at the Caulfield Cup, a condition he disclosed only after retiring. He was later diagnosed with multiple sclerosis in July 2003. He died on 21 October 2022. His son Dean White stated that his father suffered from a long battle with multiple sclerosis and died from breathing problems caused by the disease.
