= George Hanlon =

Australian horse trainer

George Hanlon (July 1917 – 28 January 2010) was an Australian race horse trainer. Born in South Australia, he was inducted in the Australian Racing Hall of Fame in 2002.

Hanlon trained three Melbourne Cup winners; Piping Lane in 1972, Arwon in 1978 and Black Knight in 1984.

He also trained the racehorse Family of Man who won the:

- 1977 and 1979 Alister Clark Stakes
- 1977 Caulfield Stakes
- 1977 W S Cox Plate
- 1978 William Reid Stakes
- 1978 Mackinnon Stakes.

Hanlon died in 2010, aged 92, at a nursing home in Geelong, Victoria where he had been living for the past year and a half.
