= Dead ringer (idiom) =

English idiom

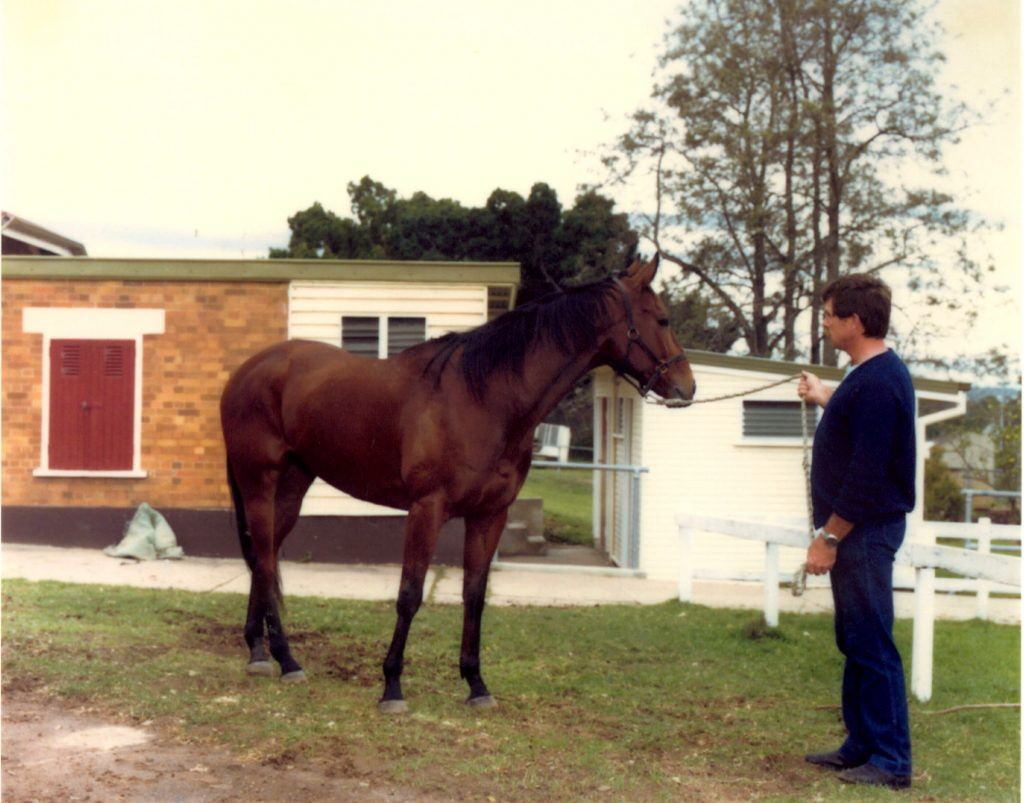
Bold Personality, who ran in place of Fine Cotton in a 1984 race, is a notable example of a ringer in the horseracing sense

Dead ringer is an idiom in English denoting a person or thing that closely resembles another. It dates back to the 19th century.

In criminal slang, the practice of substituting a cheap item for a valuable one was known as ringing the changes (a phrase derived from campanology). Those who practised this con were known as ringers. The term ringer was also used in horseracing, where it denoted someone who fraudulently substituted one horse for another, as well as the horse that had been substituted. Subsequently, it came to be used for anything that resembled something else, often with the addition of the adjective dead (meaning "exact").

As with saved by the bell, the idiom is sometimes said to derive from a custom of providing bell-pulls in coffins so that people who had been buried alive could call for help, but this is a folk etymology.
