= Bold Personality =

Australian-bred Thoroughbred racehorse

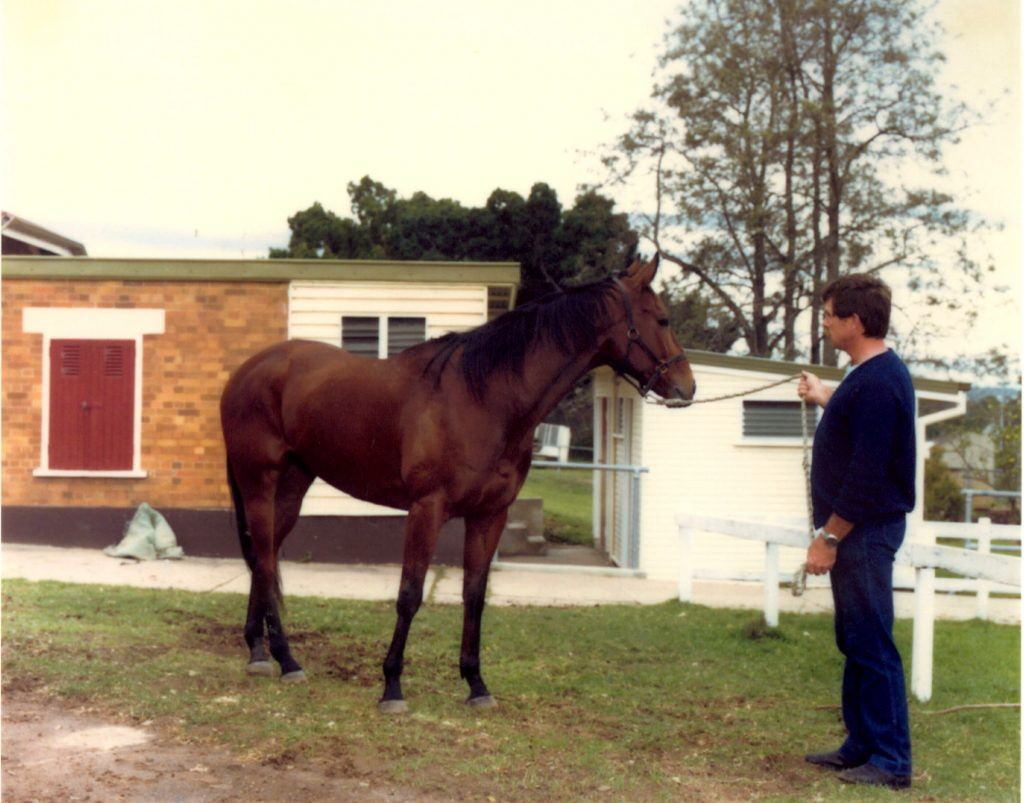
- Bold Personality, whilst being held as an exhibit at the Mounted Police Unit, Oxley with Senior Constable Ian Johnston
- Sire: Bold Aussie
- Grandsire: Bold Ruler
- Dam: Miss Personality
- Damsire: Vibrant
- Sex: Gelding
- Foaled: 1977
- Country: Australia
- Colour: Bay
- Breeder: Mr & Mrs JP Curran
- Trainer: Hayden Haitana

Bold Personality was an Australian Thoroughbred racehorse who gained notability by being substituted for the inferior horse Fine Cotton in a race at Eagle Farm Racecourse, Brisbane on 18 August 1984. The attempted scam is infamous in Australian history due to the involvement of some of racing's elite.

Bold Personality, poorly disguised as Fine Cotton, won the race by a small margin after being backed from 33/1 into odds of 7/2, but Racing Stewards were suspicious and rumours of a ring-in quickly spread around the racecourse.

A subsequent inquiry was held and the horse was disqualified. The horse trainer Hayden Haitana, and alleged organiser John Gillespie, were jailed and several people were warned off by the Australian Jockey Club. High-profile bookmakers Bill and Robbie Waterhouse were two of the people warned off, for having had prior knowledge of the scam.

Bold Personality was a bay gelding foaled on 13 August 1977 by Bold Aussie (USA) from Miss Personality by Vibrant (GB). He was bred by Mr & Mrs JP Curran, New South Wales.
