= Tom Waterhouse =

Australian businessman (born 1982)

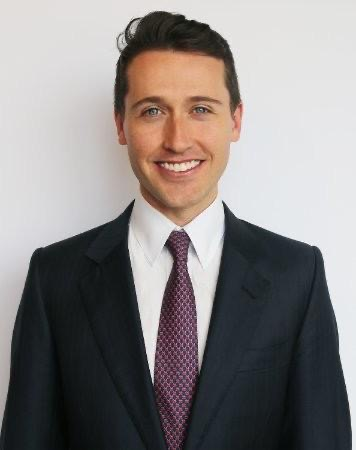
- Waterhouse (2019)
- Born: Thomas Robert Waterhouse; 11 June 1982 (age 44); Sydney, New South Wales, Australia
- Education: University of Sydney
- Occupation: Chief Investment Officer Waterhouse VC
- Spouse: Hoda Waterhouse
- Parent(s): Robbie Waterhouse; Gai Waterhouse
- Relatives: Kate Waterhouse (sister); Bill Waterhouse (grandfather); Tommy J. Smith (grandfather)
- Website: tomwaterhouse.com

Thomas Robert Waterhouse (born 11 June 1982) is an Australian businessman, Chief Investment Officer of Waterhouse VC, Director of TomWaterhouse.com, co-founder of investment firm ListedReserve.com. He is the fourth generation of the Waterhouse racing dynasty and the grandson of one of the first official bookmakers in Australia.

His grandfathers on both sides were involved in the racing industry. William "Bill" Waterhouse was the world's biggest bookmaker in the 1960s and 1970s. The late trainer Tommy J. Smith trained 279 Group One winners, including two Melbourne Cup winners.

== Early life ==
Waterhouse was born in Sydney and educated at Shore, North Sydney. He received a Bachelor of Commerce & Liberal Studies at the University of Sydney, majoring in finance and marketing with the intention of working in finance.

== Bookmaking ==
Tom Waterhouse is the fourth generation of the family to embrace racing, a tradition that began in 1898 when his great grandfather Charles Hercules Waterhouse, took out a licence to operate on the flat at Randwick. The family tradition was carried on from 1954 by Bill, who set a huge betting record as the world's biggest bookmaker.

In 2001, Waterhouse's father, Robbie Waterhouse, asked him if he would help out at Rosehill Racecourse, which Waterhouse enjoyed. He was only six months into his Commerce degree, but he immediately rearranged his timetable so that he could attend the races for the rest of the week.

After obtaining his bookmaking licence he began working as a bookmaker on course in 2003. By 2008, Waterhouse was Australia's biggest on-track bookmaker, holding more than $20 million over four days at the Melbourne Cup carnival, more than all the other bookmakers combined.

For four years Waterhouse lived in Melbourne's Crown Casino for most of the week due to the protectionist betting laws in NSW.

== Internet based business ==
In 2010 Waterhouse launched an online gambling business. The company was one of Australia's largest corporate bookmakers, with offices in Sydney, Melbourne, and Darwin. They claim a client list of 100 "high-net-worth individuals" whose minimum bet is $1000. In this time, the company grew from a start-up with three people to over 100 and from less than 1,000 clients to approximately 250,000.

In August 2013 website was sold to the international betting giant William Hill (bookmaker) where Waterhouse then continued as Managing Director of TomWaterhouse.

In July 2014, Waterhouse became CEO of William Hill Australia operating the TomWaterhouse, Centrebet, Sportingbet, and William Hill brands operating from three countries with approximately 500 employees, one million clients, and over two billion dollars in turnover.

In May 2018, William Hill sold its Australian business, seeing Waterhouse to a two-year non-compete agreement. Leaving behind his career as a bookmaker, Tom Waterhouse took back control of his brand as a racing tipping service, which attempts to give subscribers and clients betting information, tips, and strategies to win.

In July 2020 Waterhouse launched a betting aggregator service the TomWaterhouse App. The aggregator will compare odds across several corporate bookmakers and allow customers to place bets with the wagering operator of their choice.

== Investment business ==
In August 2019, Tom formed Waterhouse VC, which leverages off his 20+ years of industry experience in gaming and wagering. The fund is "almost completely focused on buying gambling or wagering services stocks listed on the ASX or around the world." The fund invests in "suppliers to the industry. The odds aggregators, fixed odds providers and things like that." It targets businesses that provide a critical service with a defensible operational moat, which are well-positioned to benefit from high growth within a specific area of gaming and wagering.

Waterhouse VC has a particular focus on US companies, with "US states (are) quickly opening up and allowing online betting for the first time after decades of it being banned outside casinos, resulting in a stampede into the market." The fund has returned 1802% since its August 2019 inception and 489% over the last 12 months. The fund is available to wholesale investors only and is diversified across both geography and market capitalisation.

== Family ==
The first bookmaker in the family was Charles Waterhouse, who attained his licence in 1898. Waterhouse's maternal grandfather, T.J Smith was an Australian racehorse trainer. His mother, Gai Waterhouse (maiden name Gabriel Marie Smith) is a leading Australian horse trainer, businesswoman, and a former actress. Gai Waterhouse served an apprenticeship under her father for fifteen years before receiving her own trainer's licence.

Waterhouse's father, Robbie Waterhouse, and grandfather William "Bill" Waterhouse are also bookmakers. They have attracted controversy in the past including the loss of their bookmaker's licences for eighteen years (originally life bans) due to their involvement in the Fine Cotton substitution scandal in 1984.

Tom Waterhouse married wife Hoda Vakili in 2011, in the Italian town of Taormina. The couple met at Sydney University, where Vakili was studying her Master's in Architecture. Close friends for years, Vakili even worked at the track for Waterhouse for three years taking bets during her degree.

== Media ==
Waterhouse is a regular contributor to many sports-related television and radio programs, as well as various newspapers and magazines.

He is the co-host of Sportsline on Sky Business, and the racing-focused Two Cups and a Plate on TVN. He pays to appear on the Nine Network's Wide World of Sports and is a regular during Nine's coverage of the Wallabies, and featured during the Rugby World Cup 2011. Waterhouse is a regular guest on 2GB with Alan Jones on Friday mornings during Autumn and Spring to discuss racing and sports. He regularly featured during the Channel Seven's coverage of Wimbledon 2012, and Ascot on TVN.

Waterhouse was a contestant on Dancing with the Stars in 2006. He was the second contestant voted off.

== More Joyous inquiry ==
At the 2013 Sydney Cup day on 27 April at Randwick Racecourse, John Singleton fired Gai Waterhouse (Tom's mother) as the trainer of his horses amid allegations that Tom Waterhouse gave acquaintances inside information that Singleton's horse More Joyous was unfit to win the All Aged Stakes. Tom Waterhouse denied any wrongdoing and was cleared in a stewards enquiry conducted by the Racing NSW. Waterhouse was warned not to use his mother's name to promote his bookmaking business.

== Awards ==
Waterhouse was included in the SmartCompany's Hot 30 Under 30 class of 2012, group of entrepreneurs aged 30 years and younger. Tomwaterhouse.com was ranked 19th in the Deloitte Technology Fast 50 Australia 2012.
