= Kate Waterhouse =

Australian journalist

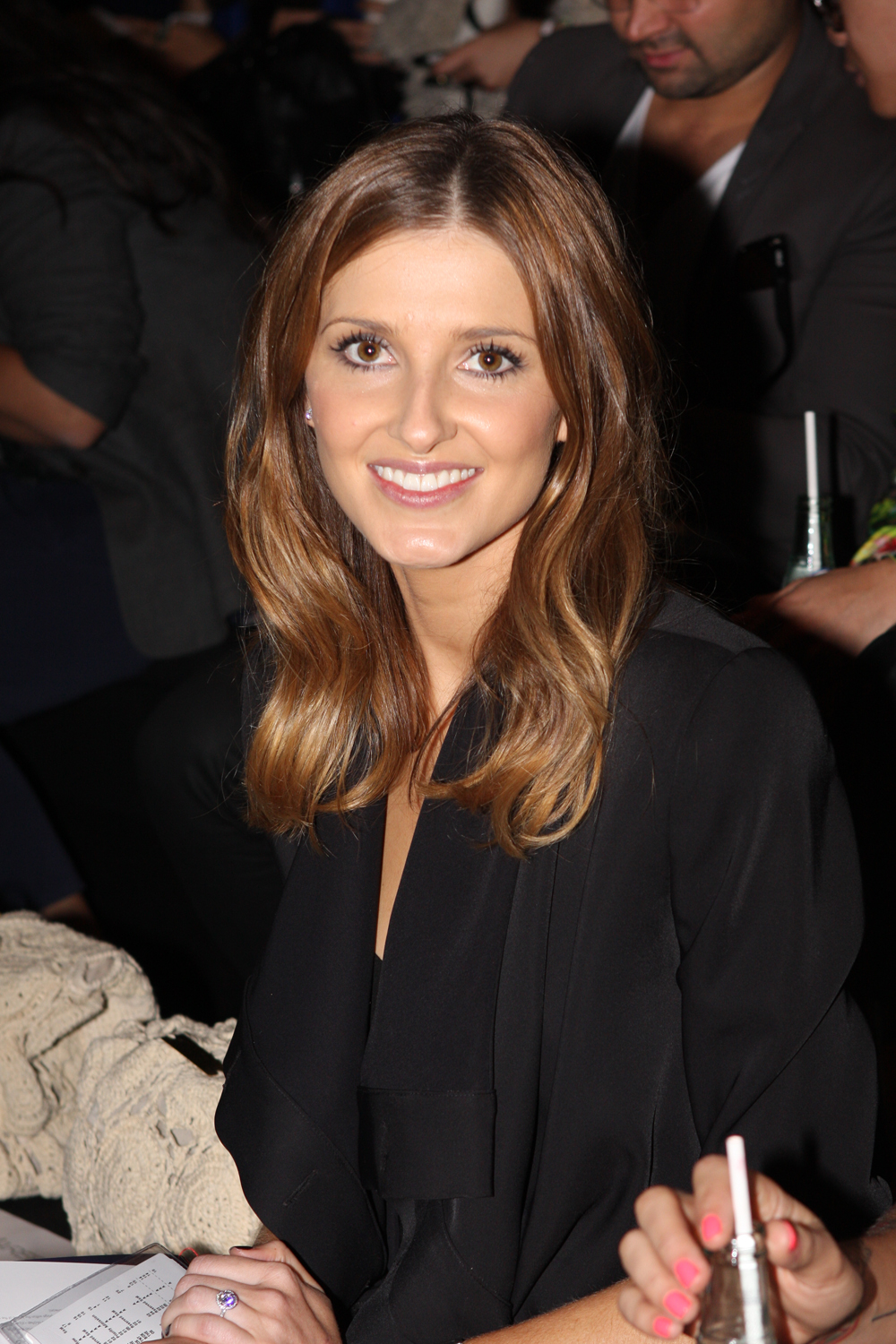
- Waterhouse in 2012
- Born: 7 December 1983 (age 42)
- Occupations: Journalist and Model
- Agent: RGM Artists Management
- Spouse: Luke Ricketson (m. 2012)
- Children: 2
- Parents: Robbie Waterhouse (father); Gai Waterhouse (mother)
- Relatives: Tom Waterhouse (brother); Bill Waterhouse (grandfather); Tommy J. Smith (grandfather)

Kate Waterhouse (born 7 December 1983) is a model and journalist, and the daughter of horse trainer Gai Waterhouse and bookmaker Robbie Waterhouse.

== Early life ==
Waterhouse was born in 1983 and grew up around Australia’s racing industry. Her mother is thoroughbred trainer Gai Waterhouse, her father is bookmaker Robbie Waterhouse and her grandfather was Tommy J. Smith. Her brother Tom Waterhouse is a businessman and bookmaker. Waterhouse found a love of fashion from going through her mother's wardrobe and getting ready for racing events.

== Career ==
Waterhouse started her journalism career as Style Editor for the Sunday Telegraph, after which she was appointed the Fashion Editor for The Sun-Herald where she reported on fashion news and trends. The weekly 'Date with Kate' column, featured in The Sun-Herald and Waterhouse interviewed local and international personalities, such as Kim Kardashian, Cameron Diaz, Miranda Kerr, Dita Von Teese and Baz Luhrmann.

In 2012, Waterhouse interviewed Mad Men star Christina Hendricks and referred to her as full-figured which resulted in backlash from the actress.

After going freelance, Waterhouse created her own website in 2013 where she reports on fashion, trends, beauty and lifestyle as well as celebrity interviews.

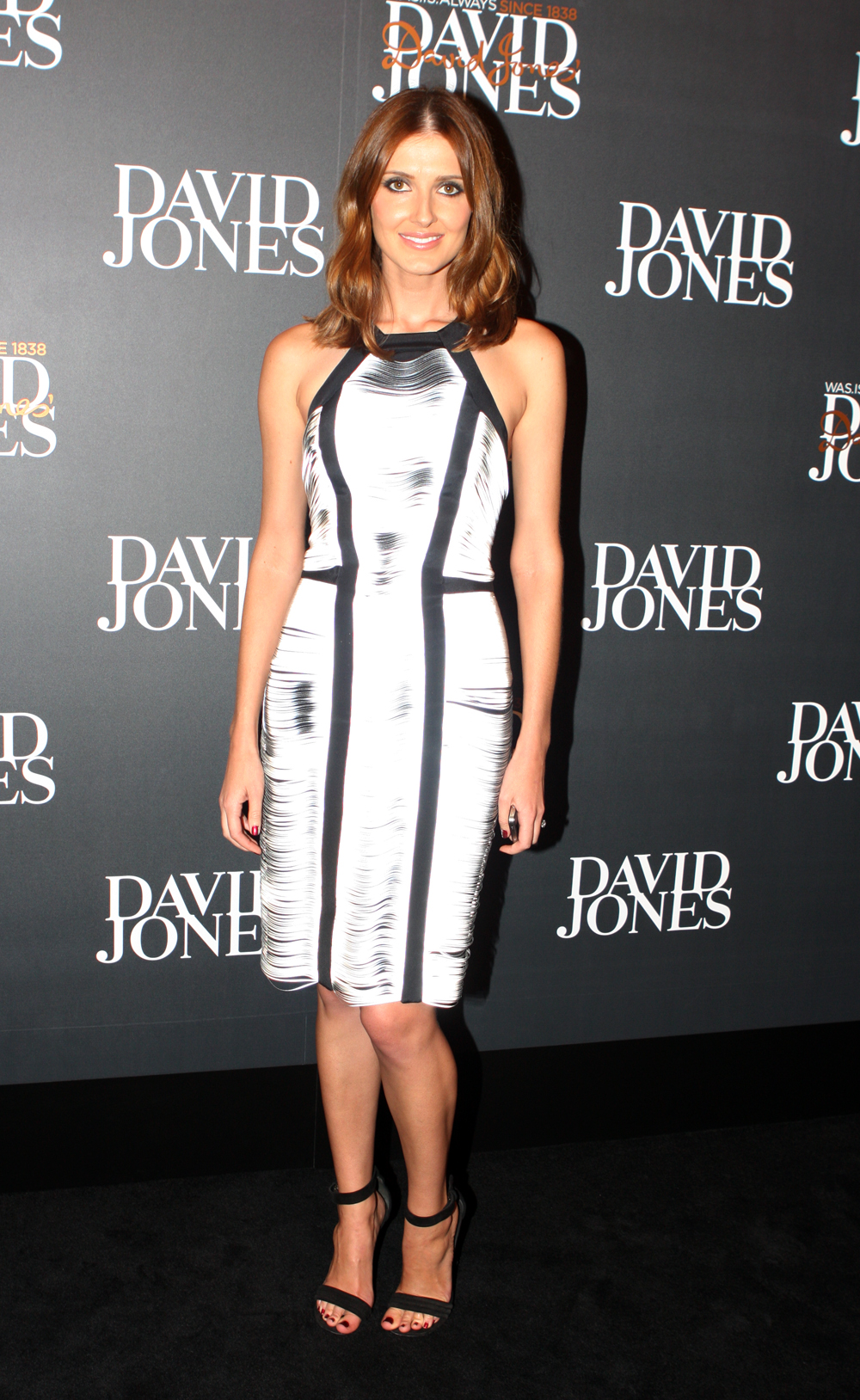
Waterhouse at David Jones AW13 Fashion Launch 2013

Various magazine publications and websites have engaged Waterhouse for contributions such as Vogue Australia, the Australian Women's Weekly and Germany's Vanity Fair magazine where she secured the worldwide exclusive interview with the King of Tonga during his coronation.

In 2014, Waterhouse was one of five main cast members of the reality show Fashion Bloggers on Foxtel's E! Channel which ran for two seasons.

Waterhouse was the face and presenter of Foxtel's Lifestyle YOU channel and regularly contributes to racing, fashion and entertainment related TV segments for various networks. Triple M Brisbane contracted Waterhouse during the Brisbane Racing Carnivals.

Waterhouse has also worked with local and international brands, including being the David Jones racewear ambassador for six years and being the face and ambassador for Hardy Brothers' 160th anniversary year. Waterhouse is currently an ambassador for Lexus Australia and Gordon's Gin.

In 2017, Waterhouse collaborated on a children's wear line, Kate Waterhouse x Sapling Child.

In 2019, Waterhouse was announced as the Australian Turf Club's Autumn Racing Ambassador which included being the Harrolds Fashion Chute judge. For the event, Waterhouse joined the Seven Horse Racing team as colour reporter.

== Personal life ==
Waterhouse married former Rugby League player Luke Ricketson in 2012. The couple have two daughters and live in Balmoral in Sydney.
