= Grand Armee (horse) =

Australian-bred Thoroughbred racehorse

- Sire: Hennessy (USA)
- Dam: Tambour (AUS)
- Damsire: Marauding (NZ)
- Sex: Gelding
- Foaled: 31 August 1998
- Died: 20 July 2017 (aged 18)
- Country: Australia
- Colour: Brown
- Breeder: Newhaven Park Stud
- Owner: AR Bell
- Trainer: Gai Waterhouse
- Record: 31:13-10-3
- Earnings: A$5,328,065

Major wins
- Ajax Stakes (2003); Doncaster Handicap (2003); George Main Stakes (2004); Queen Elizabeth Stakes (2004, 2005); LKS Mackinnon Stakes (2004); Chipping Norton Stakes (2005); Ranvet Stakes (2005); Apollo Stakes (2005)

Awards
- Australian Middle Distance Champion (2005)
- Last updated on 20 July 2017

Grand Armee (31 August 1998 – 20 July 2017) was a middle distance Australian Thoroughbred racehorse. He was a brown gelding bred by Newhaven Park Stud, New South Wales. Grand Armee was by Hennessy (USA), his dam Tambour (formerly Belle Force) won $132,200 and was by Marauding (NZ). He was trained by Gai Waterhouse.

Grand Armee's biggest win was in the 2003 Doncaster Handicap. He was also responsible for one of the big upsets on the Australian turf when he defeated Lonhro who was having his final race. Grand Armee had 31 starts for 13 wins, 10 seconds and 3 thirds, including seven Group One race wins and A$5,328,065.

After finishing racing, Grand Armee began an eventing career with NSW rider Tim Boland.

In July 2017, Grand Armee died at age 18.
