= Desert War (horse) =

Australian-bred Thoroughbred racehorse

- Sire: Desert King (IRE)
- Grandsire: Danehill (USA)
- Dam: High Heels (AUS)
- Damsire: Canny Lad (AUS)
- Sex: Gelding
- Foaled: 8 October 2000
- Country: Australia
- Colour: Brown
- Breeder: Gooree Park Stud Pty Ltd, NSW
- Owner: Gooree Pastoral Company
- Trainer: Gai Waterhouse
- Record: 45: 12-2-9
- Earnings: $3,046,610

Major wins
- Epsom Handicap (2004, 2005); Chipping Norton Stakes (2006); LKS Mackinnon Stakes (2006); AJC Queen Elizabeth Stakes (2007); Ranvet Stakes (2007)
- Last updated on 29 August 2011

Desert War (foaled 8 October 2000) was an Australian Thoroughbred racehorse gelding that won six Group one (G1) races including the Epsom Handicap (twice), Chipping Norton Stakes, LKS Mackinnon Stakes, AJC Queen Elizabeth Stakes and Ranvet Stakes.

He is a big brown gelding weighing over 600 kg, that has a star and a white sock on his near (left) hind leg. He was sired by Desert King who won the Irish Derby Stakes and Irish 2,000 Guineas and was the sire of 13 stakeswinners with 34 stakeswins including Makybe Diva (GB). Desert King was inbred to Northern Dancer in the third generation (3m x 4f). Desert War’s dam was High Heels (by Canny Lad) who is the dam of nine named horses, but Desert War is her only stakes winner.

== Racing record ==
Trained by Gai Waterhouse, he was a multiple group races winner in Sydney and Melbourne. His greatest achievement was winning consecutive Epsom Handicaps in 2004 and 2005, before finishing a close second to Sydney horse Racing to Win in 2006.

His final race was the 2008 Queen Elizabeth Stakes, before he retired. During his racing career he had 45 starts for 12 wins, 2 seconds and 9 thirds for $3,046,610.
