= Fashion Bloggers =

Australian reality documentary television series

- Genre: Reality
- Starring: Amanda Shadforth; Kate Waterhouse; Sara Donaldson; Joseph Elks; Zanita Whittington; Nadia Fairfax (season 2 – present); Margaret Zhang (season 1)
- Country of origin: Australia
- Original language: English
- No. of seasons: 2
- No. of episodes: 16

Production
- Executive producers: Philippa Whitfield Pomeranz; Rebecca Buttrose; Matthew Ferro
- Camera setup: Multiple
- Running time: 30 minutes (inc. adverts)
- Production companies: NBC Universal; Core3 Entertainment

Original release
- Network: Style Network (season 1); E! (season 2 - present)
- Release: 15 October 2014 – 23 July 2015

Fashion Bloggers is an Australian reality documentary television series that premiered on 15 October 2014 on the Style Network. The series is the first local commission for the Australian Style Network. The reality show chronicles both the professional and personal lives of independent lifestyle and fashion bloggers.

The program was renewed for a second season in March 2015, moving to sister channel E! where it premiered on 4 June 2015.

== Cast ==
| Main | Seasons | |
| Main | 1 | 2 |
|---|---|---|
| Sarah Donaldson | Main | |
| Kate Waterhouse | Main | |
| Amanda Shadforth | Main | |
| Zanita Whittington | Main | |
| Nadia Fairfax | | Main |
| Margaret Zhang | Main | |

== Episodes ==
| Series | Episodes | Originally released | |
| Series | Episodes | First released | Last released |
|---|---|---|---|
| 1 | 8 | 15 October 2014 | 3 December 2014 |
| 2 | 8 | 4 June 2015 | 23 July 2015 |

=== Season 1 (2014) ===
| No. overall | No. in season | Title | Original release date |
|---|---|---|---|
| 1 | 1 | "Lights! Camera! Fashion!" | 15 October 2014 |
| 2 | 2 | "Modern Girls Upload" | 22 October 2014 |
| 3 | 3 | "Show Pony" | 29 October 2014 |
| 4 | 4 | "Off Duty" | 5 November 2014 |
| 5 | 5 | "Up, Up and Away!" | 12 November 2014 |
| 6 | 6 | "Style Shoot Post" | 19 November 2014 |
| 7 | 7 | "Through the Looking Glass" | 26 November 2014 |
| 8 | 8 | "Baby it's Warm Outside" | 3 December 2014 |

=== Season 2 (2015) ===
| No. overall | No. in season | Title | Original release date |
|---|---|---|---|
| 9 | 1 | "Ready! Set! Runway!" | 4 June 2015 |
| 10 | 2 | "Inspired By..." | 11 June 2015 |
| 11 | 3 | "Who Runs The World?" | 18 June 2015 |
| 12 | 4 | "Sports Luxe" | 25 June 2015 |
| 13 | 5 | "Lady Boss" | 2 July 2015 |
| 14 | 6 | "Wanderlust" | 9 July 2015 |
| 15 | 7 | "Reality Check" | 16 July 2015 |
| 16 | 8 | "Passport Required" | 23 July 2015 |

== Broadcast ==
Outside of Australia, the series has been screened on variations of E! in South-East Asia, the UK, France and South Africa.

Episodes are also uploaded to the program's official YouTube channel.
