= Queen Elizabeth Stakes (ATC) =

Australian Turf Club horse race at Randwick Racecourse, Sydney

- Peter Pan, 1933 winner
- Class: Group 1
- Location: Randwick Racecourse, Sydney, Australia
- Inaugurated: 1851 (as Queen's Plate)
- Race type: Thoroughbred

Race information
- Distance: 2,000 metres
- Surface: Turf
- Qualification: Three year old and older
- Weight: weight-for-age
- Purse: $5,000,000 (2026)

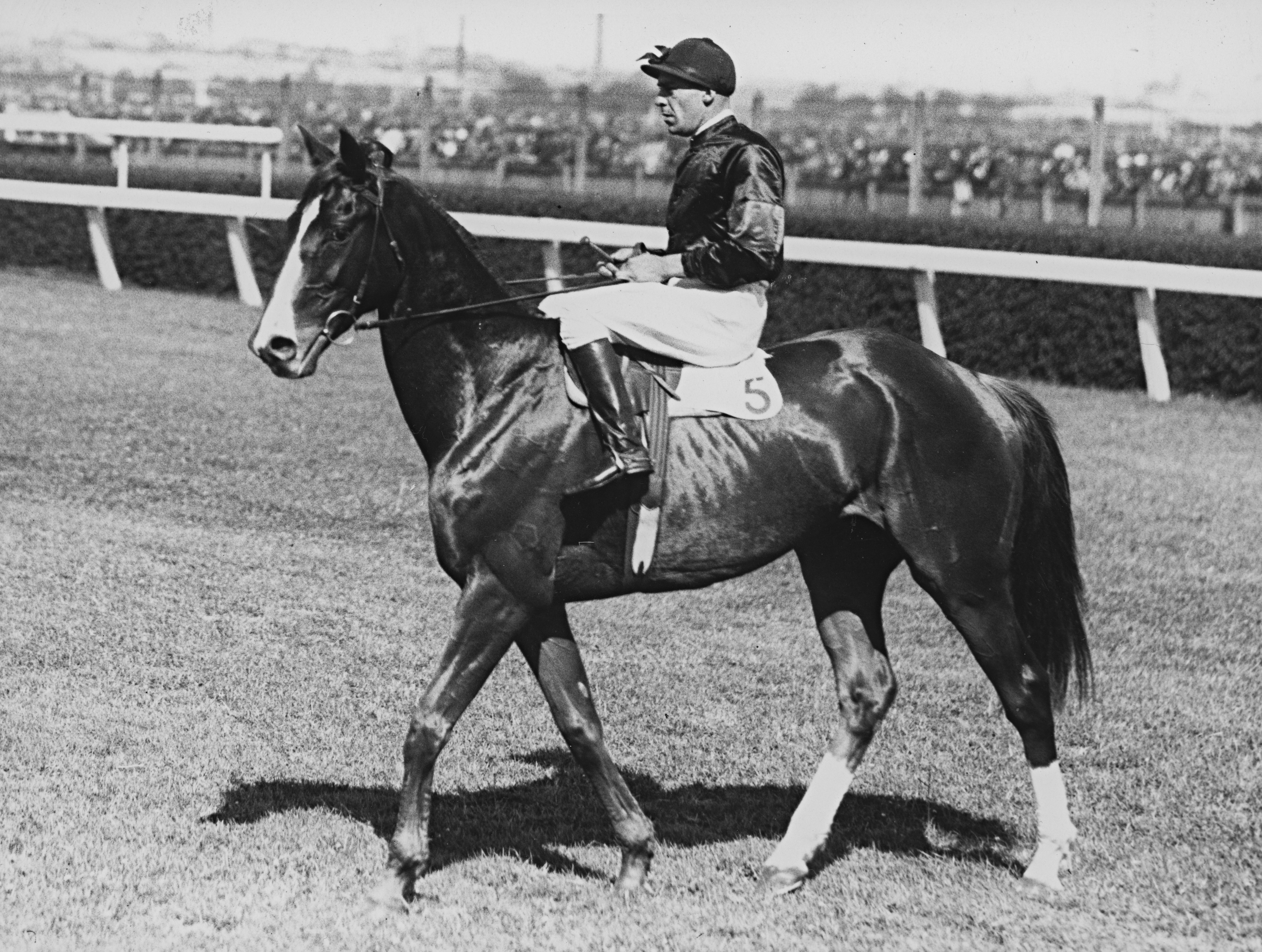
Rogilla, 1934 winner

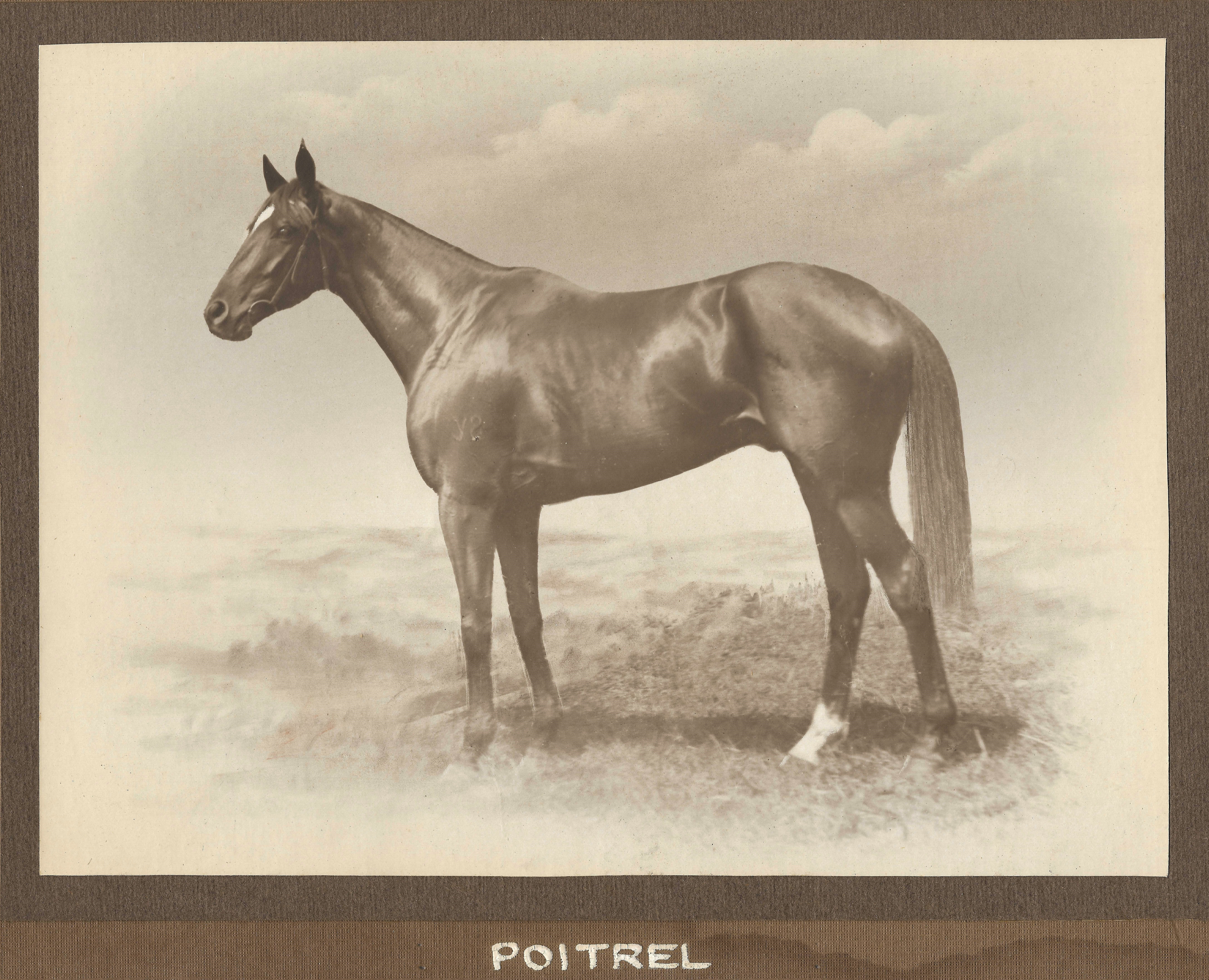
Poitrel, 1919 & 1920 winner

The Queen Elizabeth Stakes, formerly known as the Queen's Plate, AJC Plate, and AJC King's Cup, is an Australian Turf Club Group 1 Weight for Age thoroughbred horse race run over a distance of 2,000 metres at Randwick Racecourse, Sydney, Australia, in the autumn during the ATC Championships series.

Prize money in 2013 was A$500,000 and was increased to A$4,000,000 in 2014 to become the richest race of the Sydney Autumn Carnival and as of 2020 the third richest WFA race in Australia (after the W. S. Cox Plate and the Everest).

== History ==
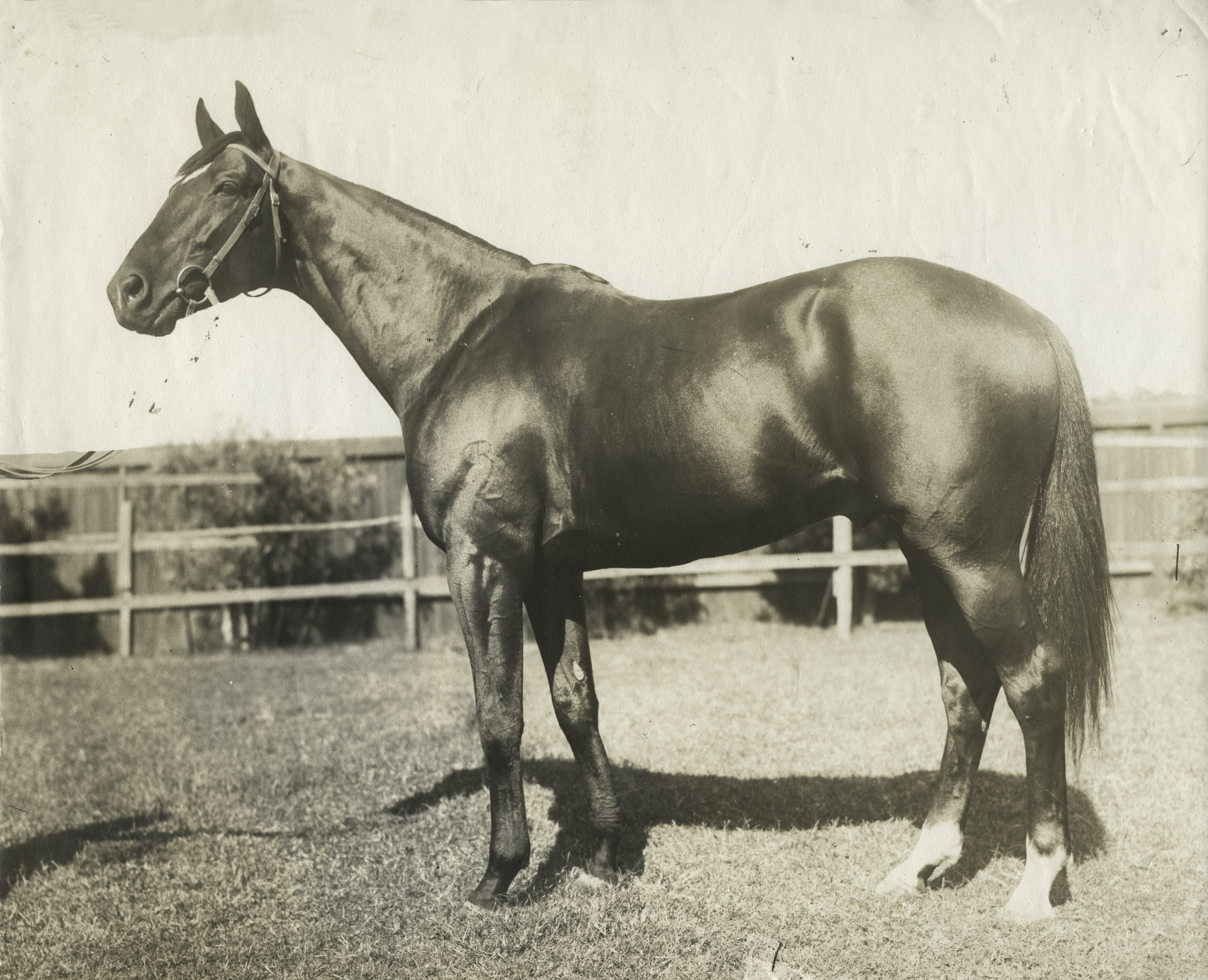
Poseidon, 1908 winner

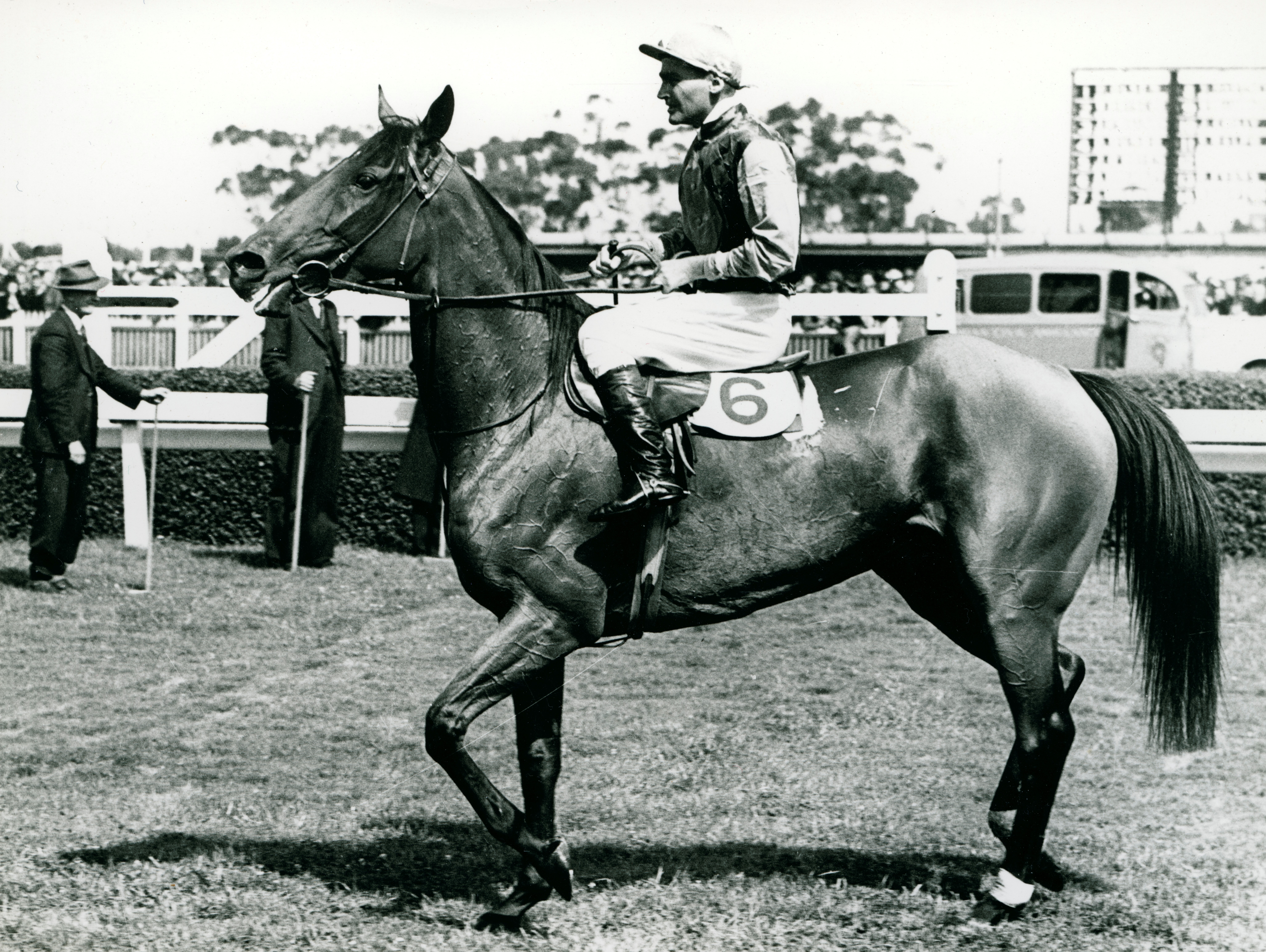
Flight, 1946 winner

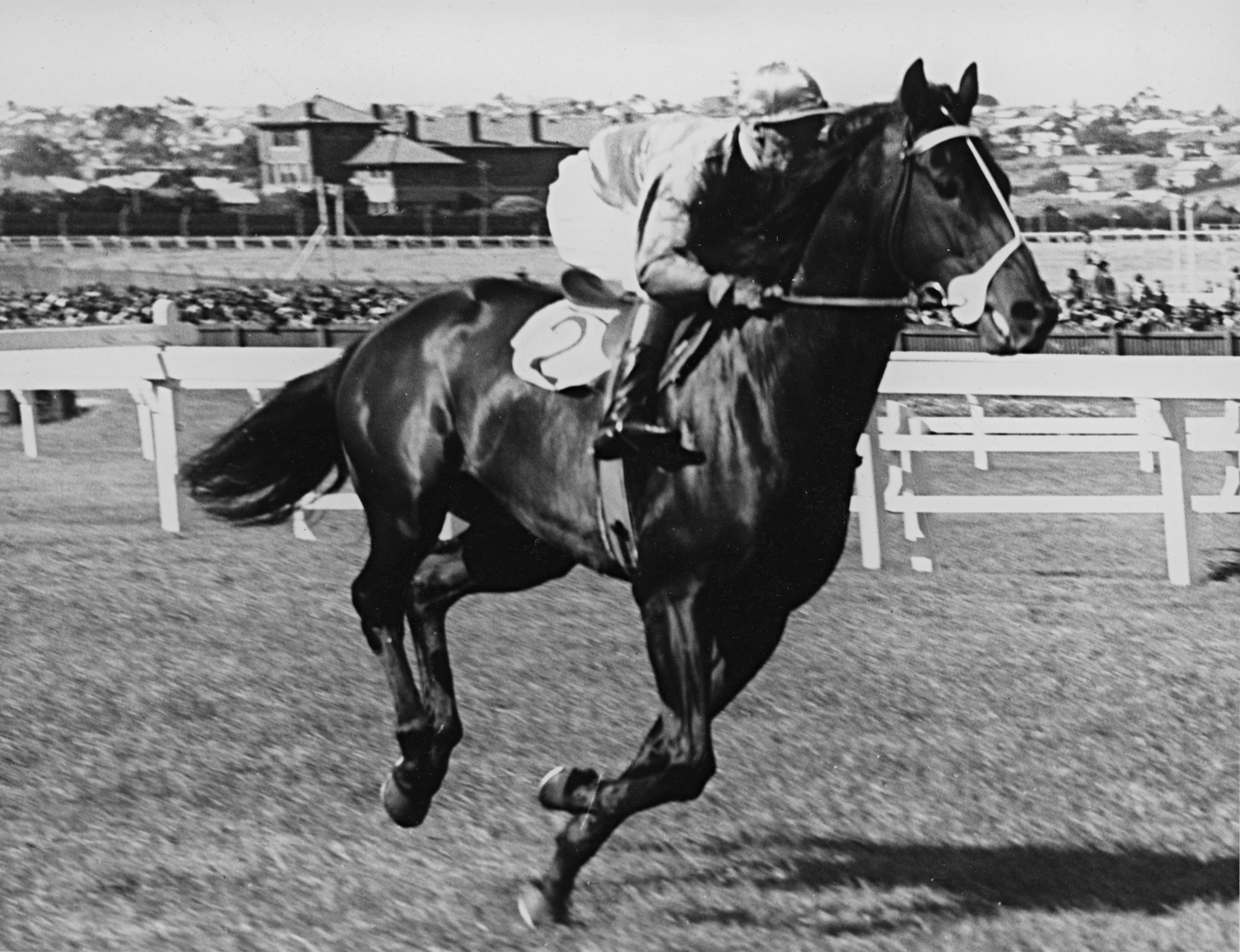
Beau Vite, 1941 winner

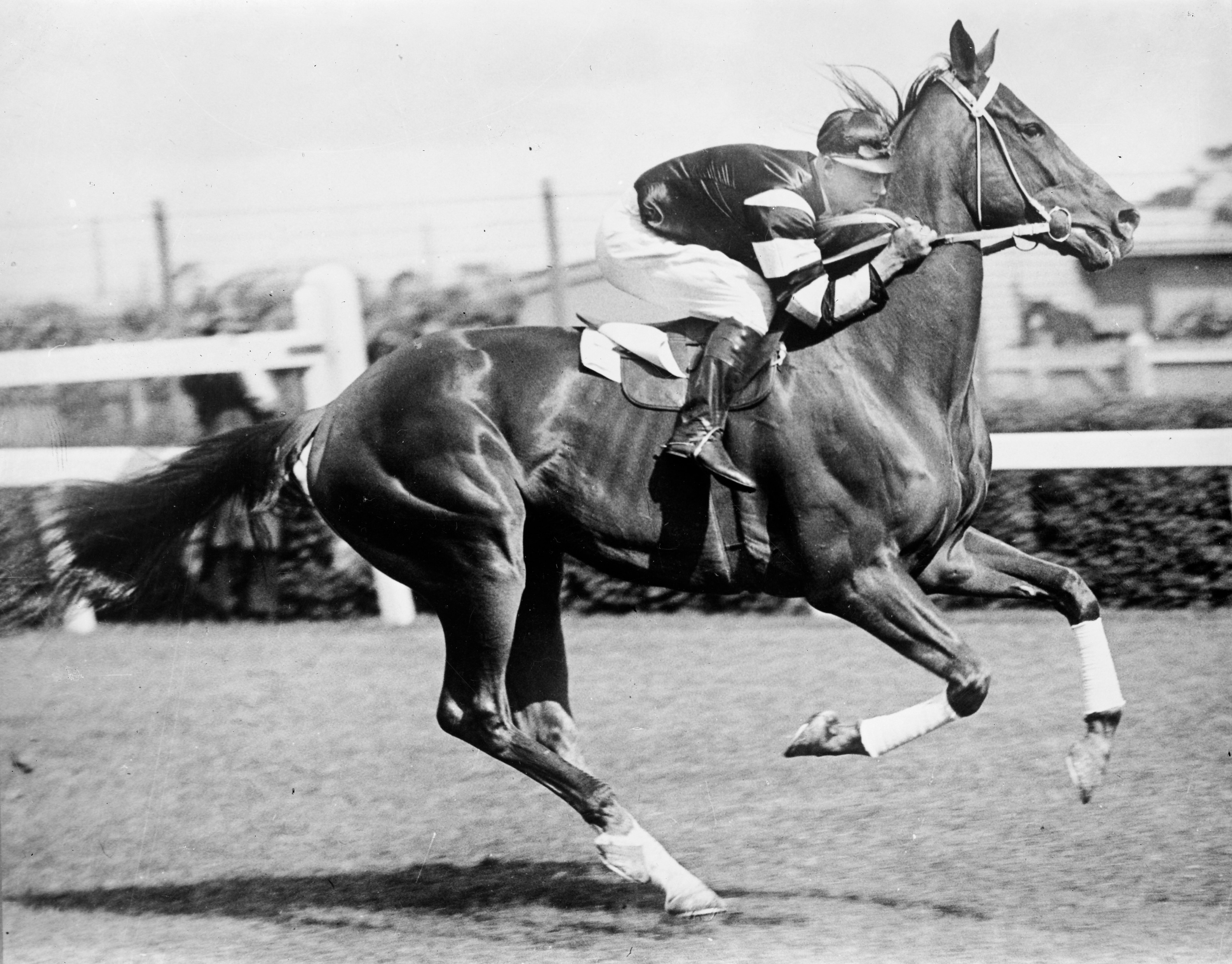
Phar Lap, 1930 winner

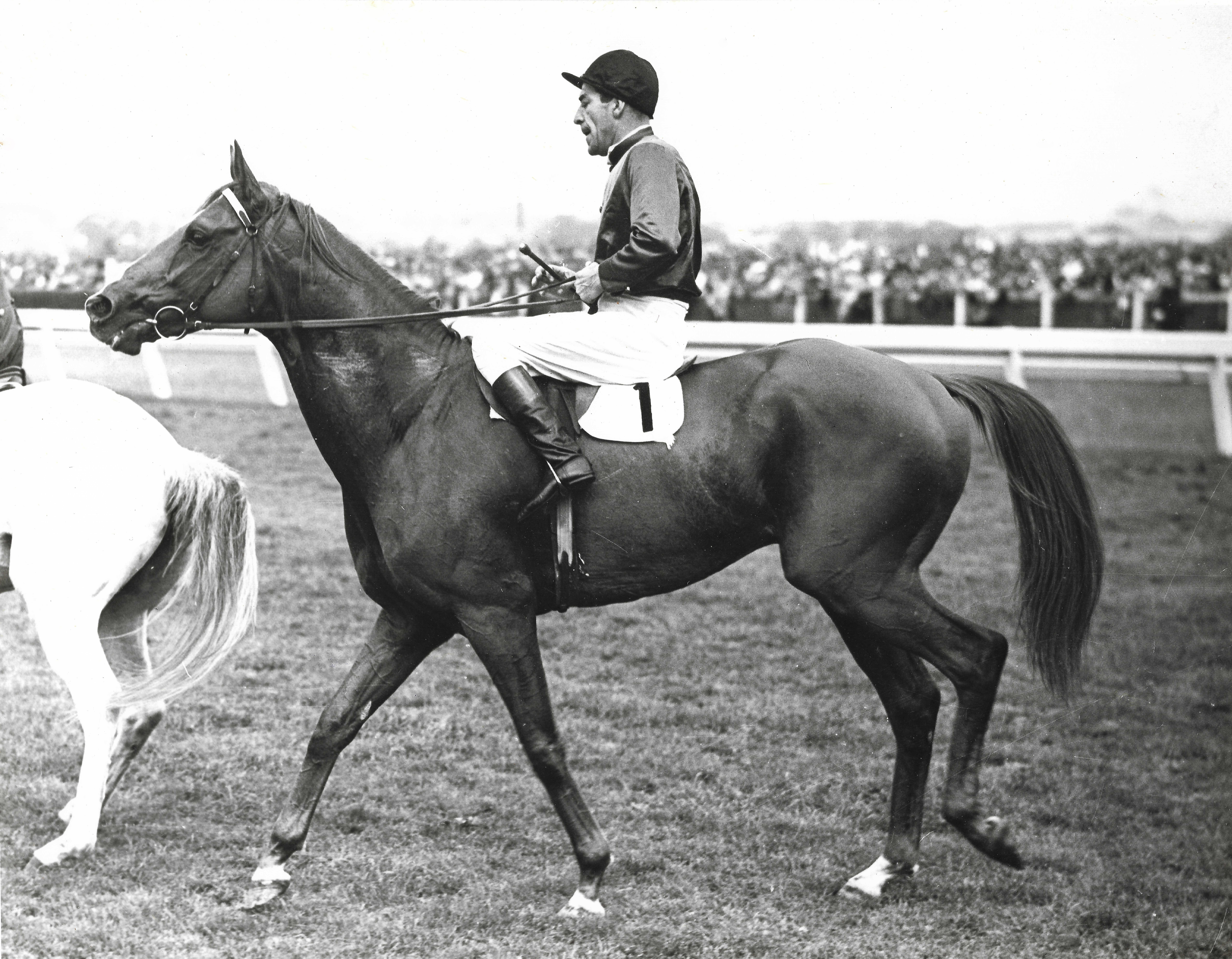
Russia, 1947 & 1948 winner

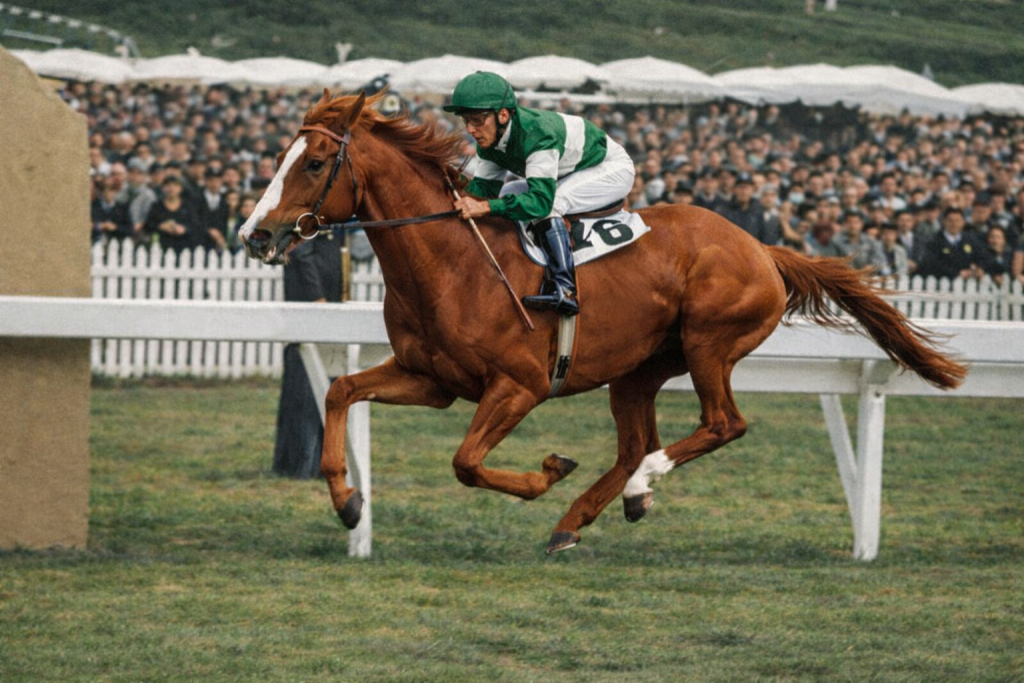
Carbon Copy, 1949 winner

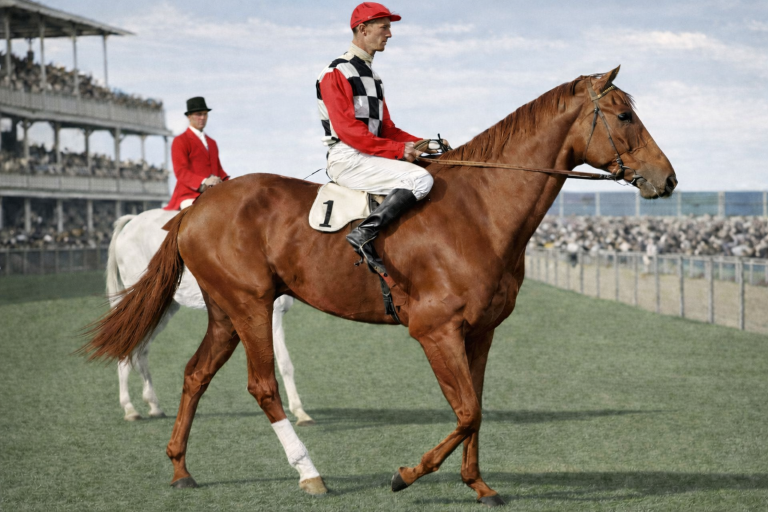
Strephon, 1929 winner

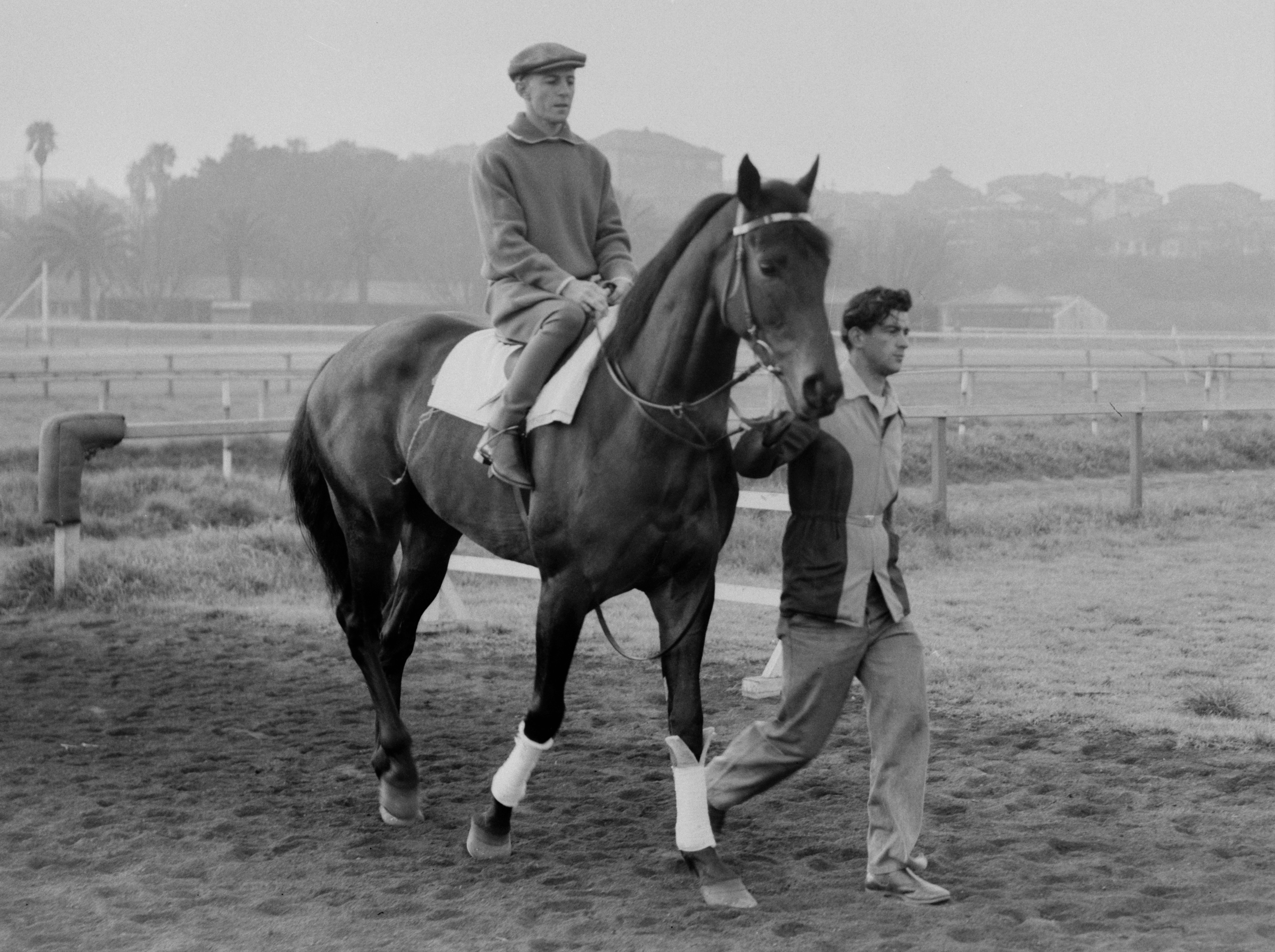
Prince Cortauld, 1955 winner

The origins of this race are firmly associated with colonial Sydney and the growth of thoroughbred racing in the colony during the 1840s and 1850s. The Australian Jockey Club initiated an autumn race meet which coincided with the Easter holiday period and created several races which exist even today. One of these races was the Queen's Plate in honour of Queen Victoria which was first run in 1851 over a distance of about 3 miles.
Through the early 20th century the race continued to hold its prestige, but with the decline in long distance racing, the AJC focused on the Sydney Cup as the premier long distance event of the AJC Autumn Carnival. By the mid 1950s the race had changed its name and had its distance shortened. Distance was changed several times until today's distance of 2000 metres in 1986.

The ATC focused on the Queen Elizabeth Stakes as it became the A$4,000,000 signature event of a new Sydney autumn racing series called "The Championships", attracting international entries.

== Name ==
- 1851–1872 - Queen's Plate
- 1873–1927 - AJC Plate
- 1928 - AJC King's Cup
- 1929–1933 - AJC Plate
- 1934 - AJC King's Cup
- 1935–1954 - AJC Plate
- 1954 onwards - Queen Elizabeth Stakes

In February 1954, Queen Elizabeth II visited Australia and the Australian Jockey Club consequently named a new race in her honour. She was present at Randwick on 6 February 1954 and witnessed 33/1 long shot Blue Ocean win the race with a track record of 2 minutes 27 3/4 seconds for the 1 1/2 miles race.

On the last day of the 1954 AJC Autumn Carnival was the last-named race for the AJC Plate, as Lancaster won the Weight for Age 2-mile race. The next year, on the last day of 1955 AJC Autumn Carnival held on 16 April 1955, the fourth race on the card was the Queen Elizabeth Randwick Stakes over a distance of 1 3/4 miles.

== Distance ==
- 1851–1913 – 3 miles (~4800 metres)
- 1914 - 1 1/2 miles (~2400 metres)
- 1915–1922 – 3 miles (~4800 metres)
- 1923–1927 - 2 1/4 miles (~3600 metres)
- 1928 - 1 1/2 miles (~2400 metres) (AJC Kings Cup)
- 1929–1933 - 2 1/4 miles (~3600 metres)
- 1934 - 1 1/2 miles (~2400 metres) (AJC Kings Cup)
- 1935–1941 - 2 1/4 miles (~3600 metres)
- 1944–1946 - 1 3/4 miles (~2800 metres)
- 1947–1953 - 2 1/4 miles (~3600 metres)
- 1954 - 1 1/2 miles (~2400 metres) (Queen Elizabeth Stakes)
- 1954 – 2 miles (~3200 metres) (AJC Plate)
- 1955–1969 - 1 3/4 miles (~2800 metres)
- 1970–1971 - 1 1/2 miles (~2400 metres)
- 1972 - 1 3/4 miles (~2800 metres)
- 1973–1978 – 2400 metres
- 1979–1983 – 2000 metres
- 1984–1985 – 2400 metres
- 1986 onwards - 2000 metres

== 1934 racebook ==
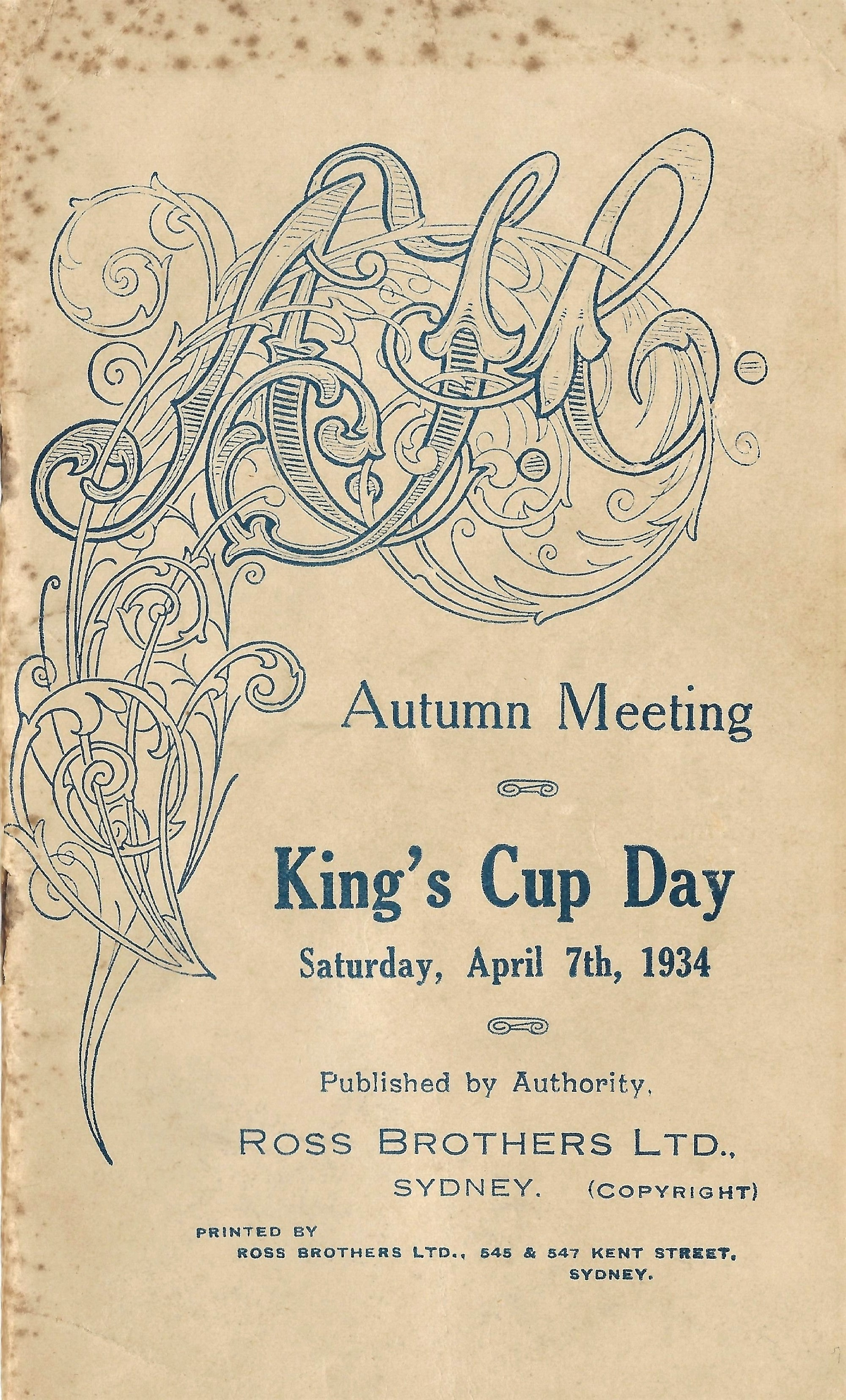
1934 AJC Kings Cup racebook front cover

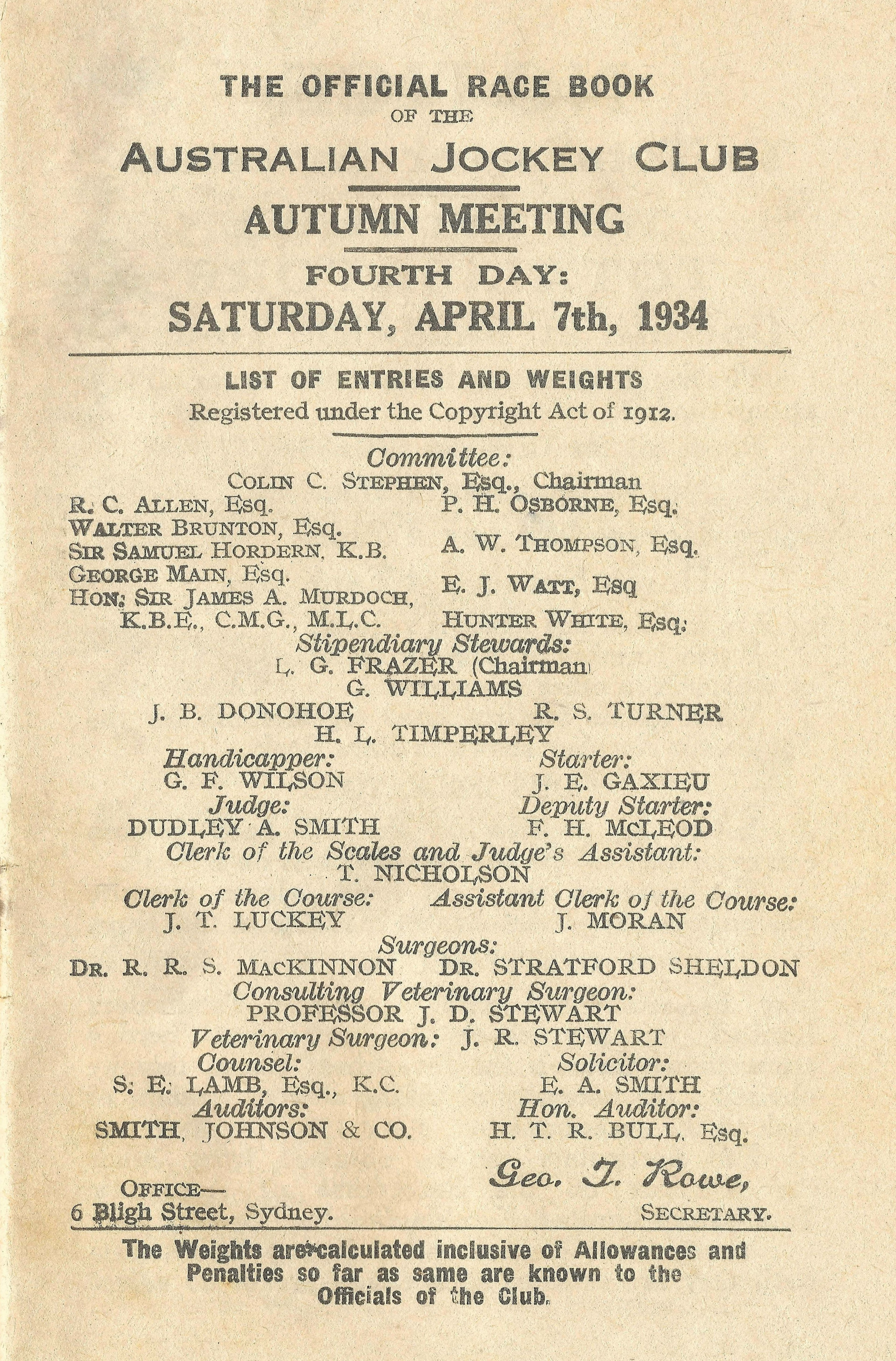
1934 AJC Kings Cup showing raceday officials

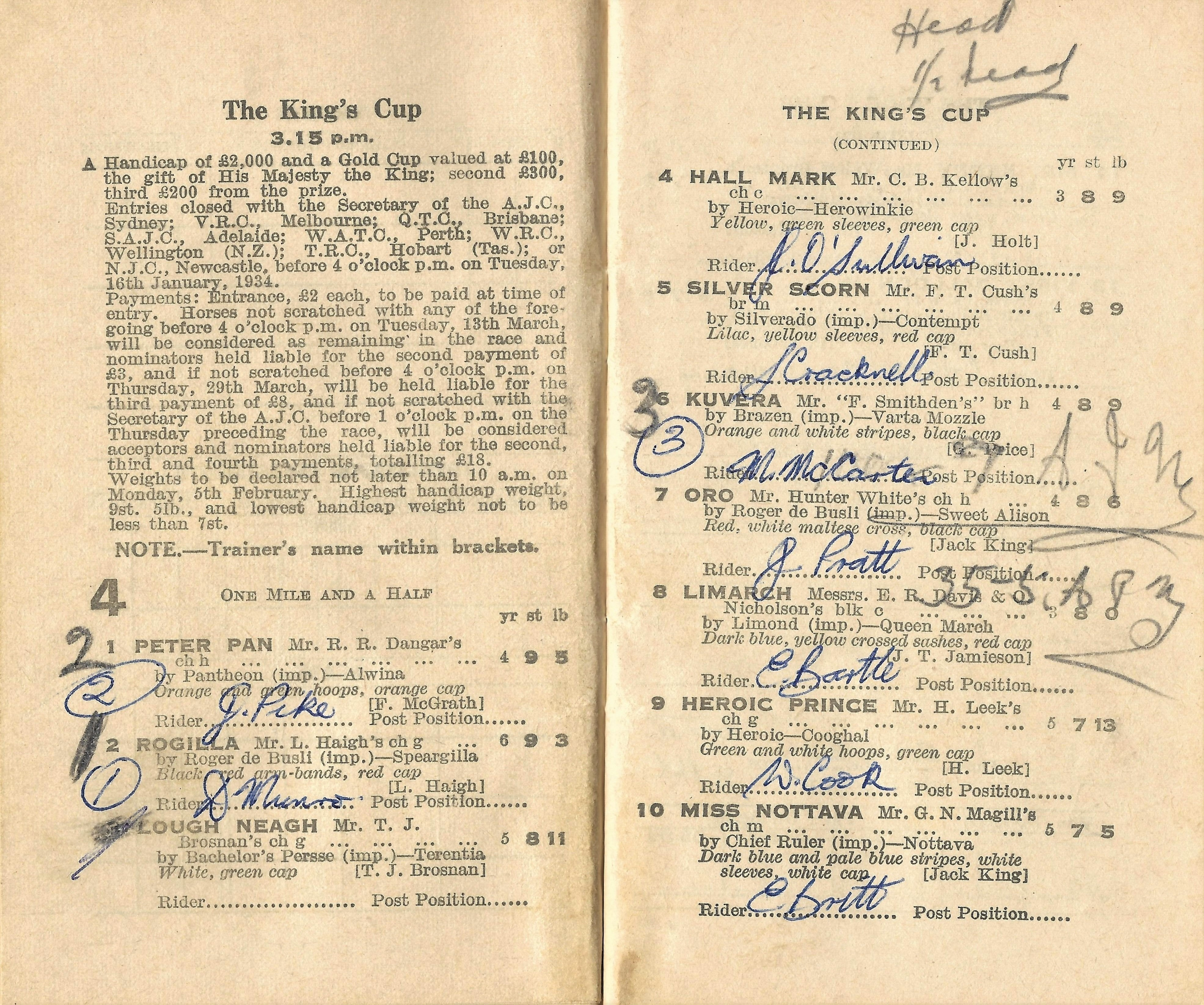
1934 AJC Kings Cup starters and results the winner, Rogilla

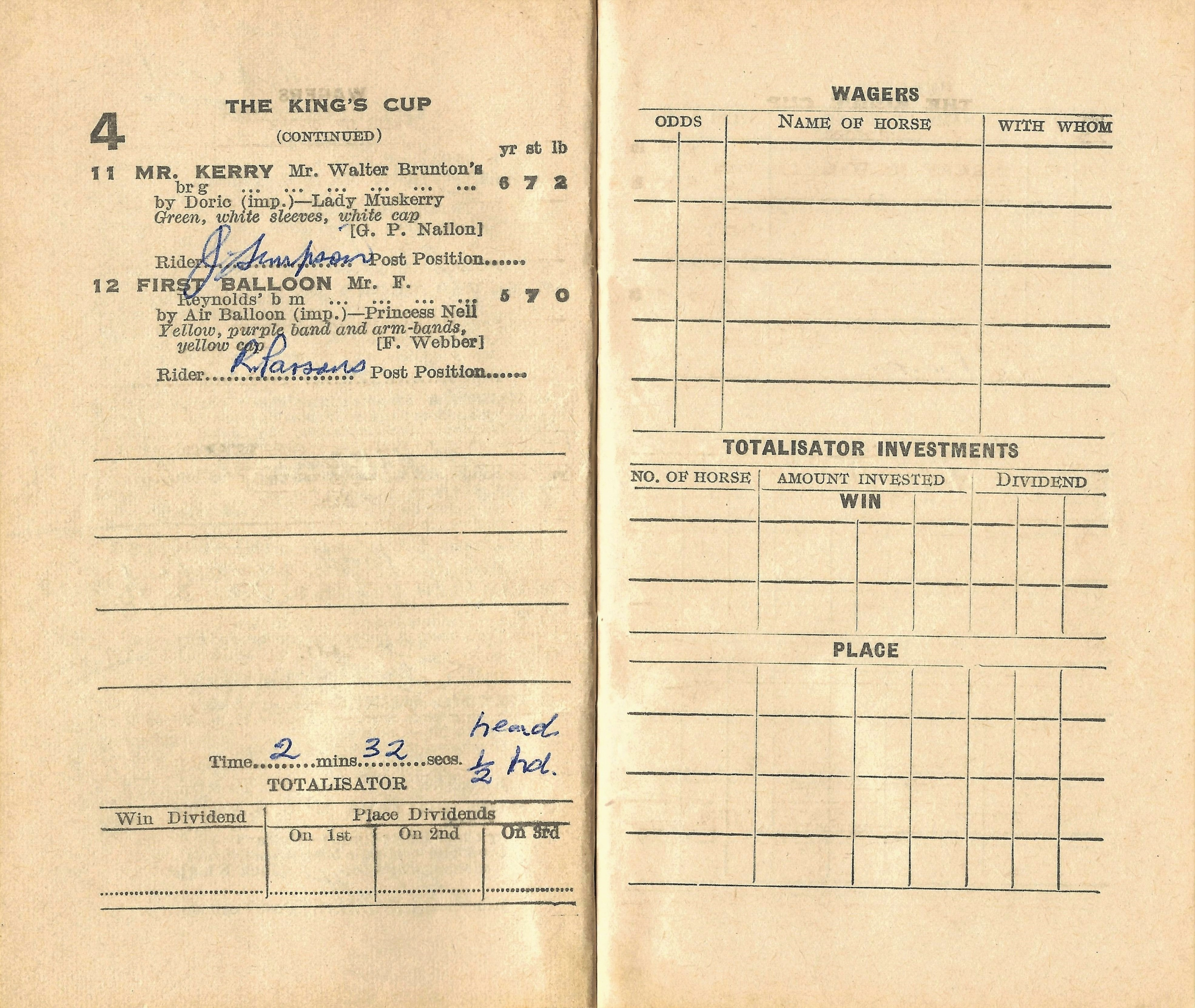
1934 AJC Kings Cup starters and results

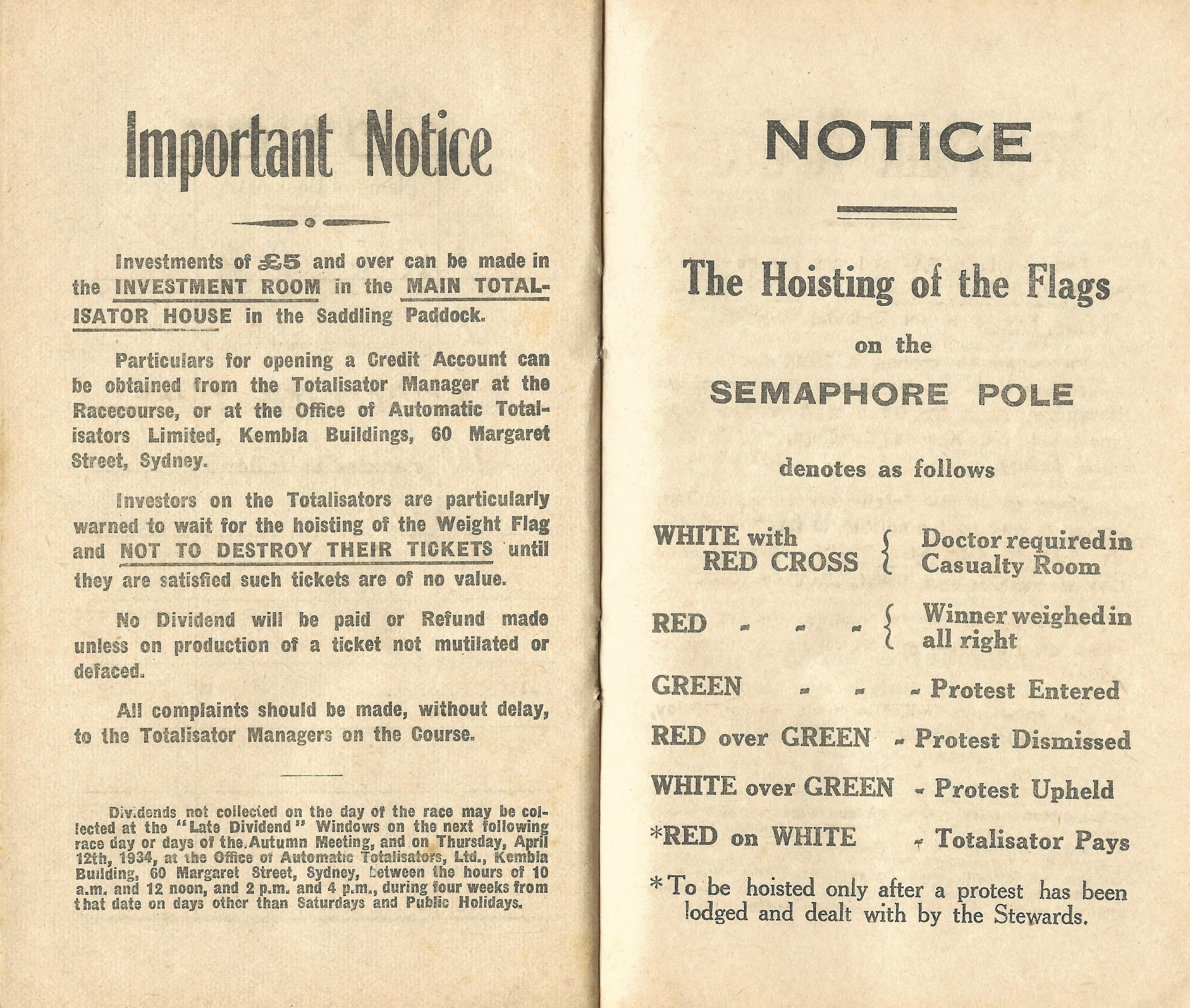
1934 AJC Kings Cup racebook showing semaphore flags

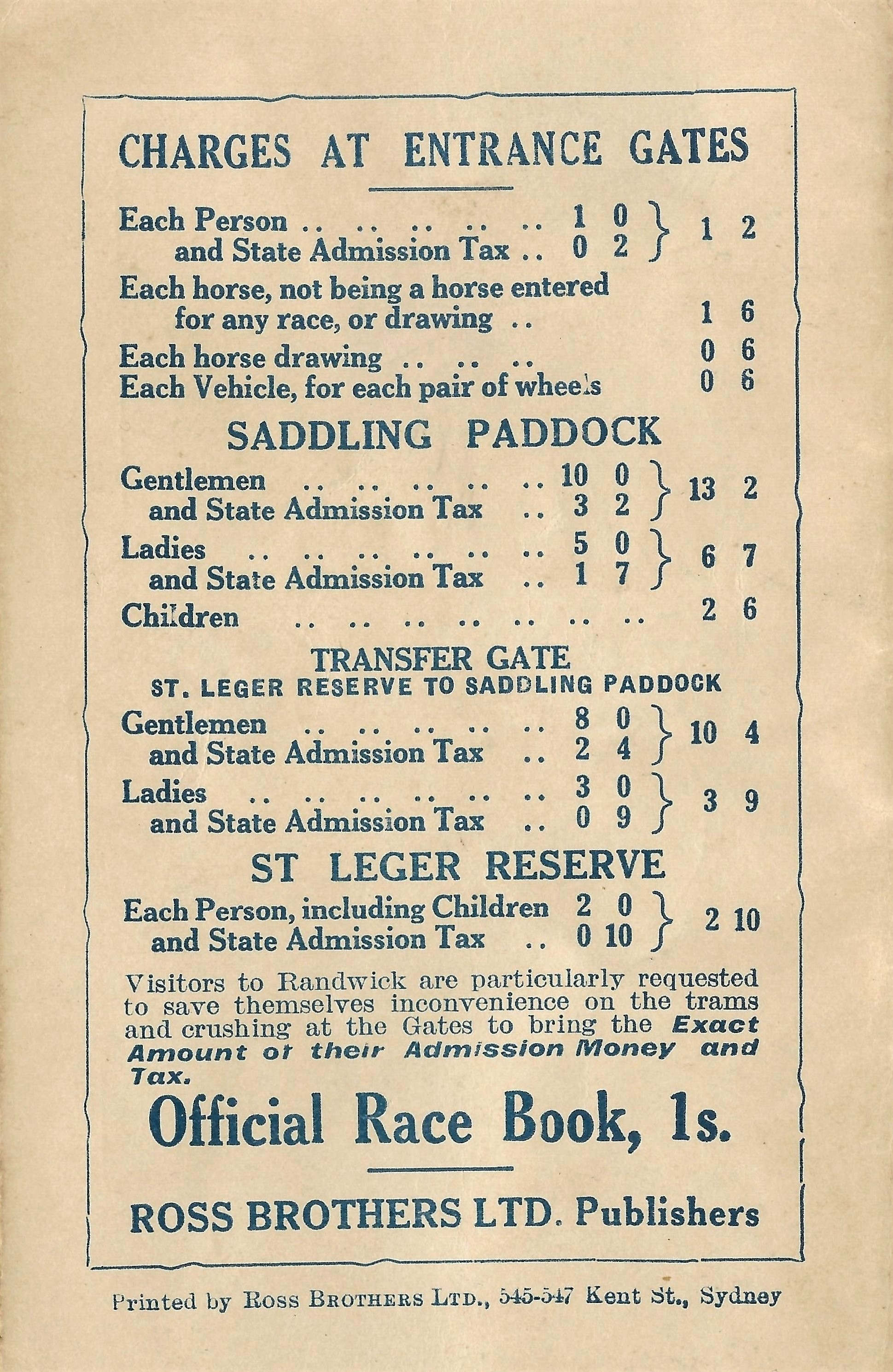
Back cover showing charges at the entrance gates

== 1954 racebook ==
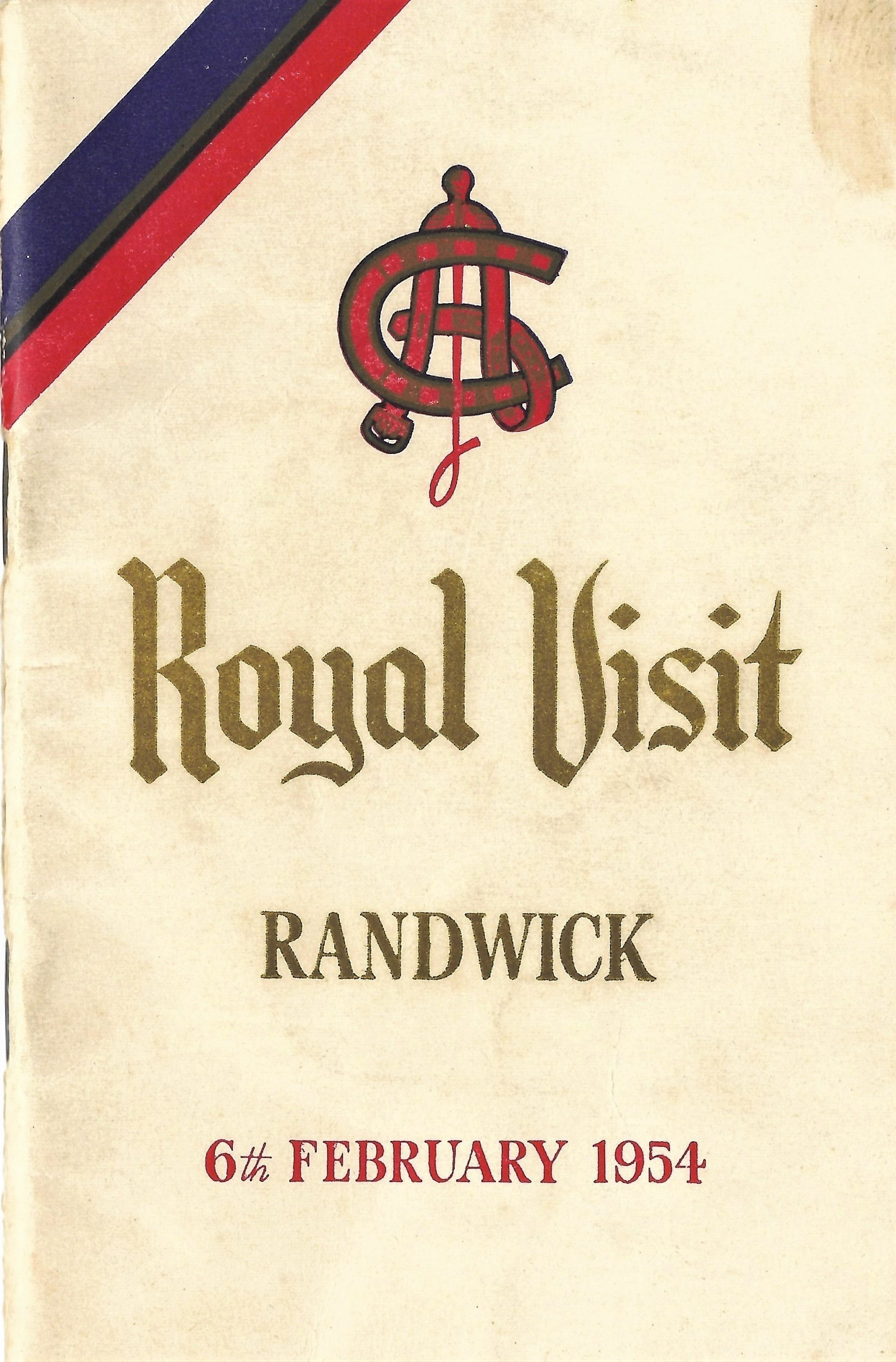
1954 AJC Queen Elizabeth Stakes racebook front cover

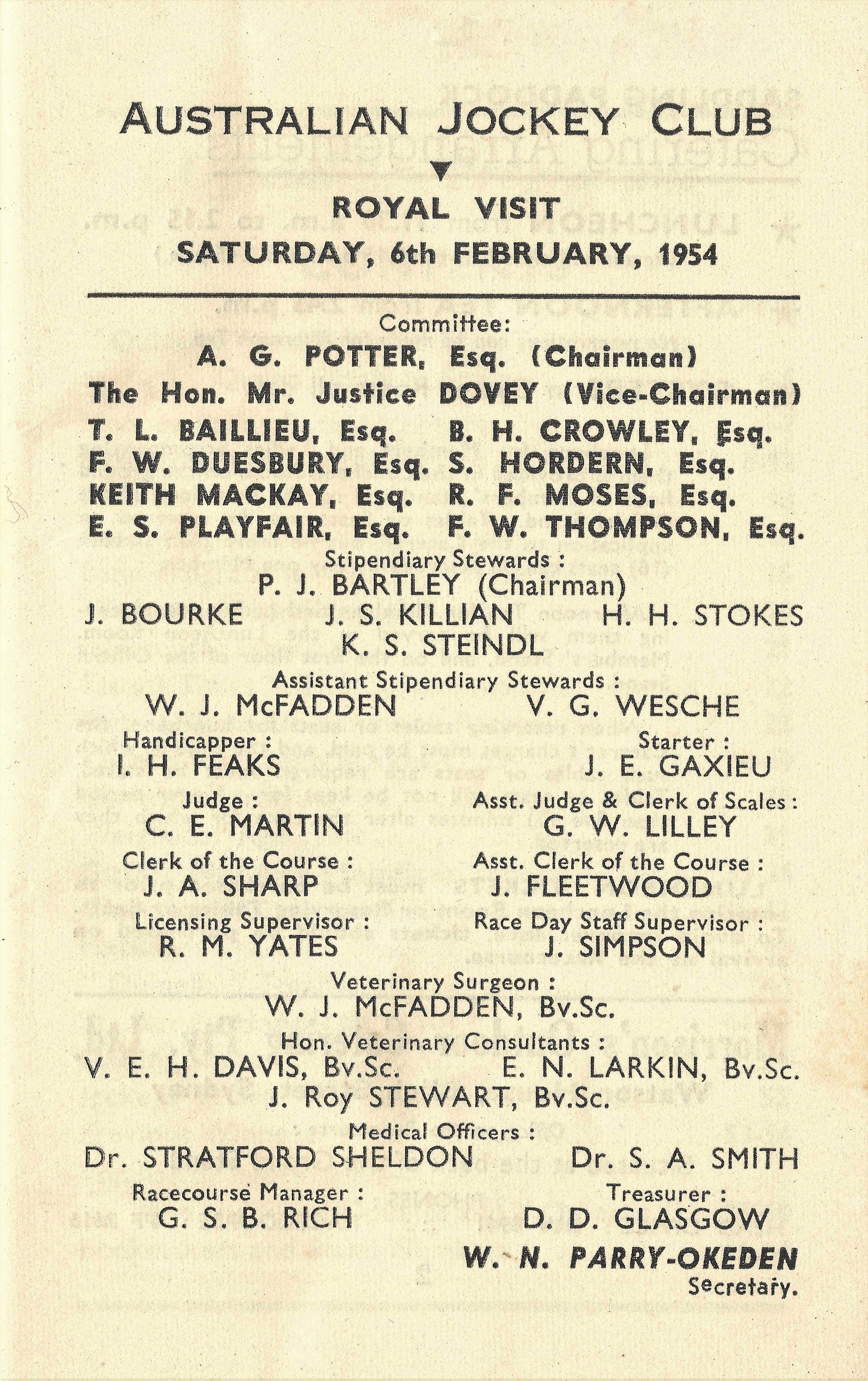
1954 AJC Queen Elizabeth Stakes showing raceday officials

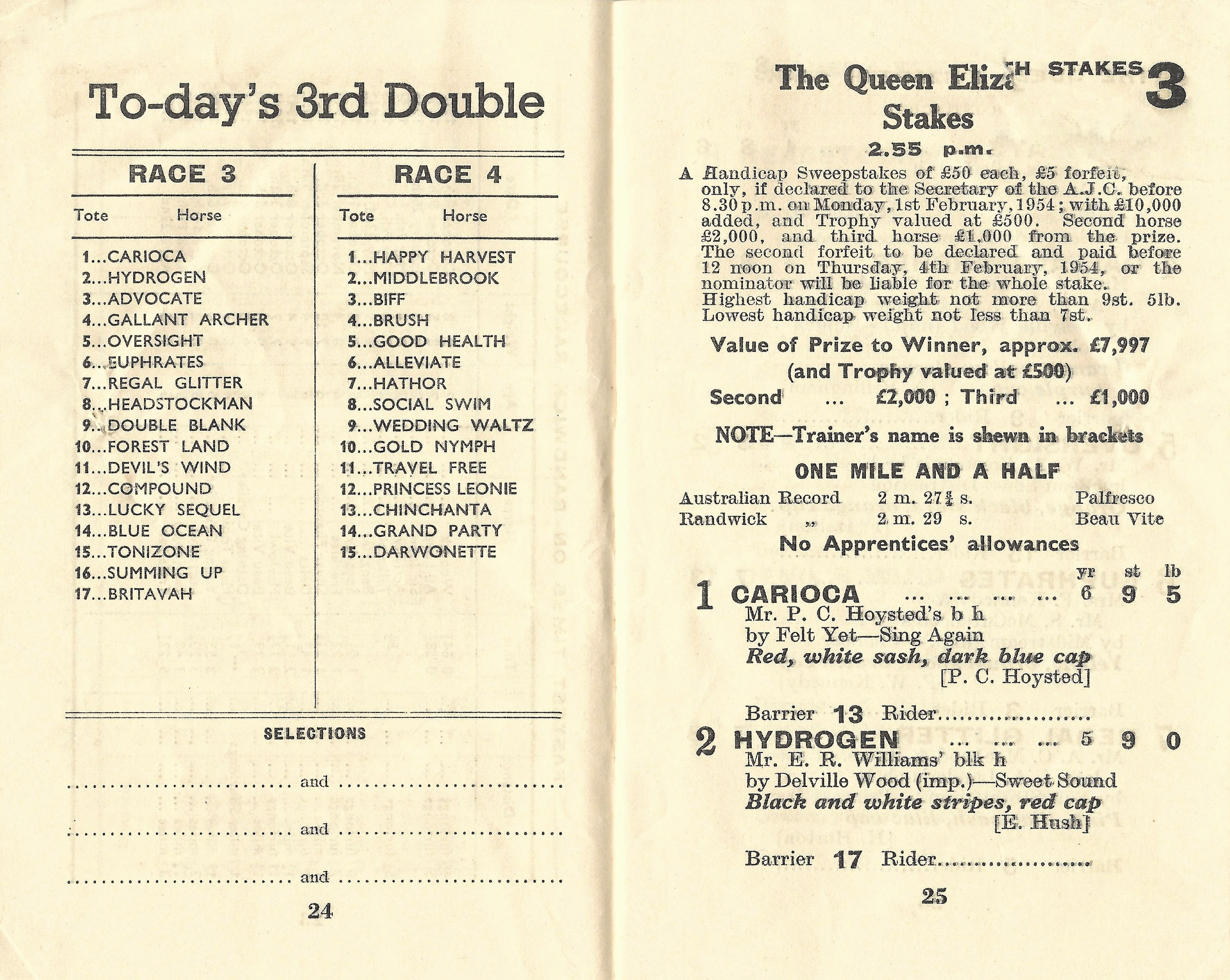
1954 Queen Elizabeth Stakes starters and results

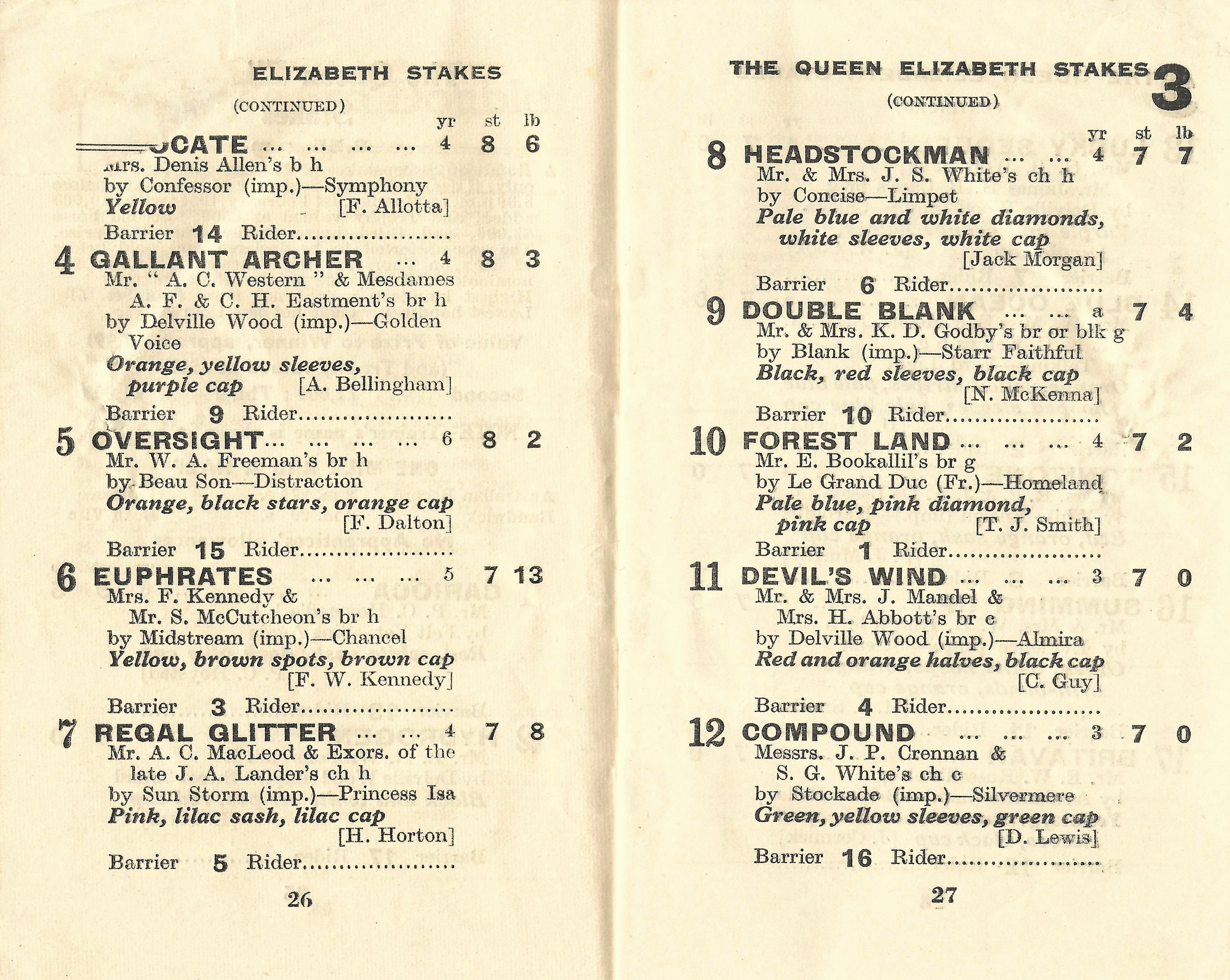
1954 Queen Elizabeth Stakes starters and results

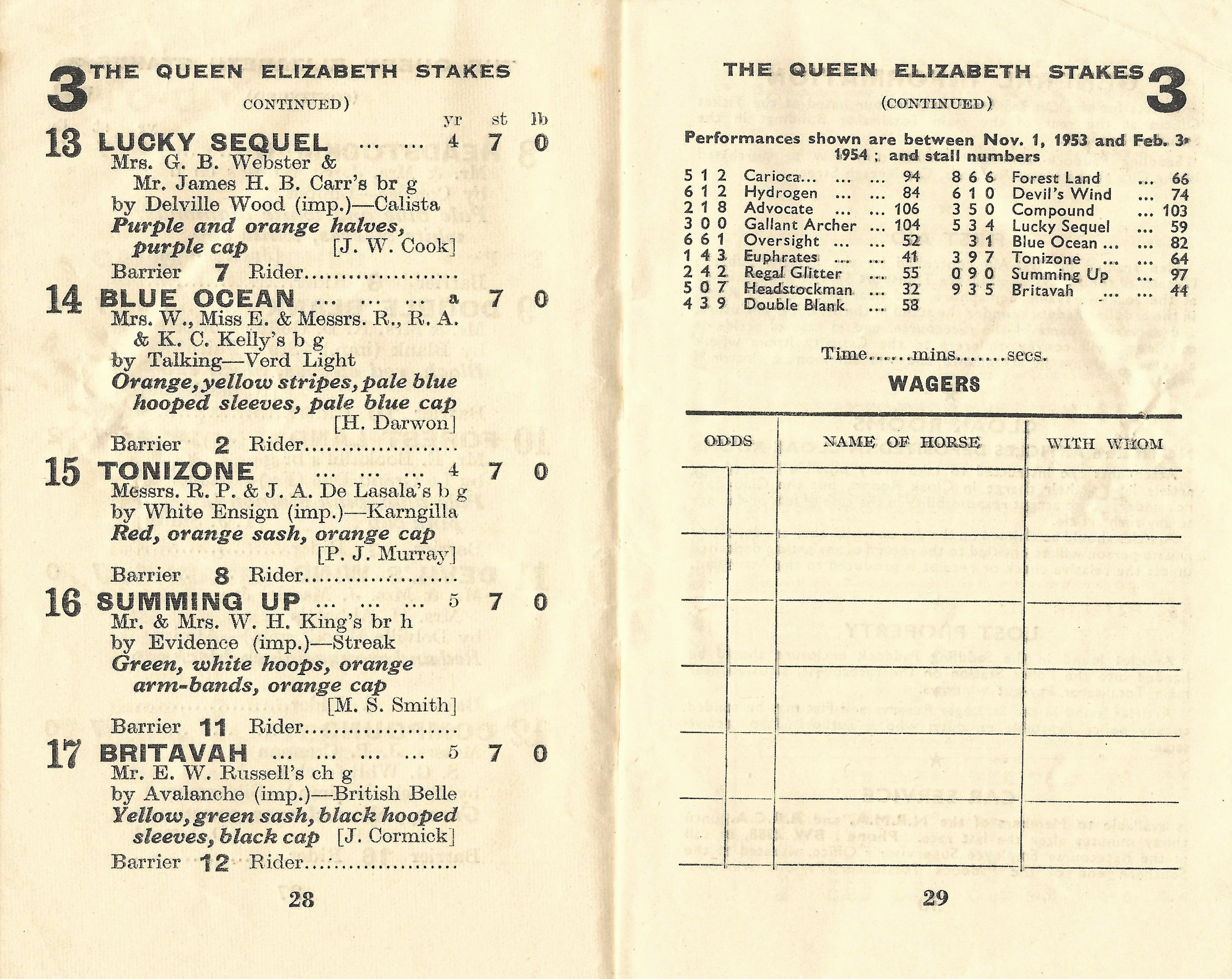
1954 Queen Elizabeth Stakes showing the winner, Blue Ocean

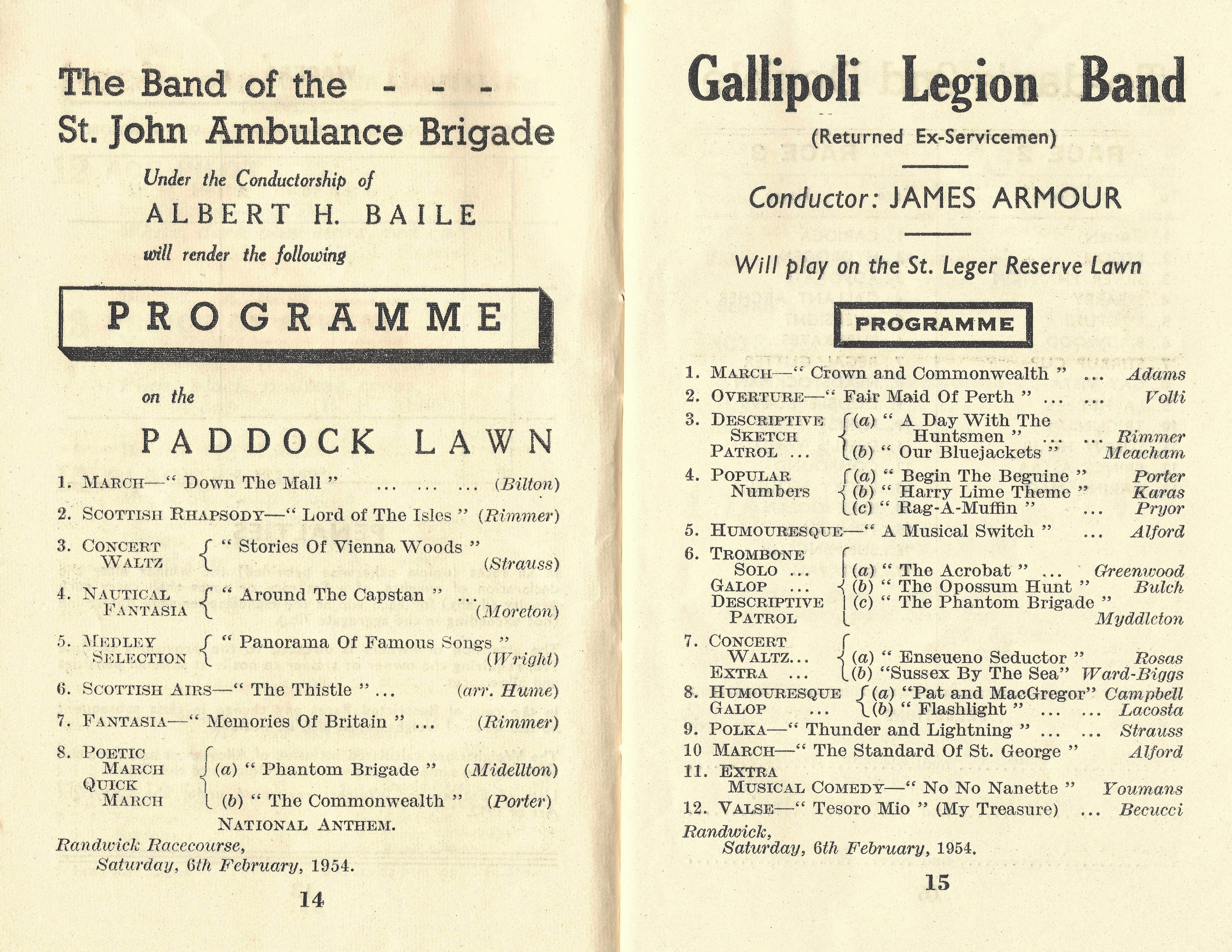
1954 AJC Queen Elizabeth Stakes showing Band Entertainment program

== Records ==
Only Carbine (1889–91), Trafalgar (1909, 1911–12), David (1921–23) and Tulloch (1958, 1960–61) have won the race 3 times. Winx (10-1 on/1-10) as heavy favourite won the race for a third successive time on 13 April 2019.

The 19th century horse trainer Etienne L. de Mestre won the race 9 times, in 1862, 1868, 1870, 1871, 1873, 1874, 1876, 1878 and 1879.

== Winners ==
=== Queen Elizabeth Stakes ===
The following are past winners of the race.

- 2026 - Sir Delius
- 2025 - Via Sistina
- 2024 - Pride Of Jenni
- 2023 - Dubai Honour
- 2022 - Think It Over
- 2021 - Addeybb
- 2020 - Addeybb
- 2019 - Winx
- 2018 - Winx
- 2017 - Winx
- 2016 - Lucia Valentina
- 2015 - Criterion
- 2014 - It's A Dundeel
- 2013 - Reliable Man
- 2012 - More Joyous
- 2011 - My Kingdom of Fife
- 2010 - Road To Rock
- 2009 - Pompeii Ruler
- 2008 - Sarrera
- 2007 - Desert War
- 2006 - Eremein
- 2005 - Grand Armee
- 2004 - Grand Armee
- 2003 - Lonhro
- 2002 - Defier
- 2001 - Shogun Lodge
- 2000 - Georgie Boy
- 1999 - Intergaze
- 1998 - Might And Power
- 1997 - Intergaze
- 1996 - Doriemus
- 1995 - Jeune
- 1994 - Durbridge
- 1993 - Veandercross
- 1992 - Rough Habit
- 1991 - Stylish Century
- 1990 - Sydeston
- 1989 - Our Poetic Prince
- 1988 - Authaal
- 1987 - Dinky Flyer
- 1986 - Tristarc
- 1985 - Rising Prince
- 1984 - Chiamare
- 1983 - Fountaincourt
- 1982 - Prince Majestic
- 1981 - My Blue Denim
- 1980 - Iko
- 1979 - Shivaree
- 1978 - Ming Dynasty
- 1977 - Ngawyni
- 1976 - Taras Bulba
- 1975 - Jandell
- 1974 - Battle Heights
- 1973 - Apollo Eleven
- 1972 - Tails
- 1971 - Gay Icarus
- 1970 - Panvale
- 1969 - Lowland
- 1968 - General Command
- 1967 - Garcon
- 1966 - Prince Grant
- 1965 - Fair Patton
- 1964 - Summer Regent
- 1963 - Burgos
- 1962 - Nilarco
- 1961 - Tulloch
- 1960 - Tulloch
- 1959 - Caesar
- 1958 - Tulloch
- 1957 - Empire Link
- 1956 - Beaupa
- 1955 - Prince Cortauld
- 1954 - Blue Ocean

=== AJC Plate ===
- 1954 - Lancaster
- 1953 - Jan
- 1952 - Aristocrat
- 1951 - Playboy
- 1950 - Hurry Up
- 1949 - Carbon Copy
- 1948 - Russia
- 1947 - Russia
- 1946 - Flight
- 1945 - Craigie
- 1944 - Katanga
- 1943 - race not held
- 1942 - race not held
- 1941 - Beau Vite
- 1940 - Mosaic
- 1939 - Defaulter
- 1938 - Old Rowley
- 1937 - Allunga
- 1936 - Silver Ring
- 1935 - Master Brierly
- 1934 - Rogilla
- 1933 - Peter Pan
- 1932 - Veilmond
- 1931 - The Dimmer
- 1930 - Phar Lap
- 1929 - Strephon
- 1928 - Limerick
- 1927 - Limerick
- 1926 - Windbag
- 1925 - Windbag
- 1924 - Rapine
- 1923 - David
- 1922 - David
- 1921 - David
- 1920 - Poitrel
- 1919 - Poitrel
- 1918 - Lanius
- 1917 - Kandos
- 1916 - Greencap
- 1915 - Ulva's Isle
- 1914 - Cagou
- 1913 - Harpist
- 1912 - Trafalgar
- 1911 - Trafalgar
- 1910 - Prince Foote
- 1909 - Trafalgar
- 1908 - Poseidon
- 1907 - Dividend
- 1906 - Tartan
- 1905 - Emir
- 1904 - Lord Cardigan
- 1903 - The Victory
- 1902 - Wakeful
- 1901 - La Carabine
- 1900 - La Carabine
- 1899 - Merloolas
- 1898 - Amberite
- 1897 - Newhaven
- 1896 - The Harvester
- 1895 - Havoc
- 1894 - Light Artillery
- 1893 - The Admiral
- 1892 - La Tosca
- 1891 - Carbine
- 1890 - Carbine
- 1889 - Carbine
- 1888 - Abercorn
- 1887 - Trident
- 1886 - Matchlock
- 1885 - Reginald
- 1884 - Legrand
- 1883 - Plunger
- 1882 - The Drummer
- 1881 - Progress
- 1880 - Caspian
- 1879 - Chester
- 1878 - Chester
- 1877 - Robinson Crusoe
- 1876 - Robin Hood
- 1875 - Lurline
- 1874 - Dagworth

=== Queen's Plate ===
- 1873 - ‡Dagworth
- 1872 - Hamlet
- 1871 - Tim Whiffler
- 1870 - Tim Whiffler
- 1869 - The Barb
- 1868 - †Tim Whiffler
- 1867 - Fishhook
- 1866 - Cossack
- 1865 - Canobie
- 1864 - Tarragon
- 1863 - Tarragon
- 1862 - Archer
- 1861 - Talleyrand
- 1860 - Gratis
- 1859 - Strop
- 1858 - Zoe
- 1857 - Veno
- 1856 - Cooramin
- 1855 - Vanguard
- 1854 - Sportsman
- 1853 - Sportsman
- 1852 - Cossack
- 1851 - Cossack

‡ Dagworth and Reprieve dead heated. On a second rerun Dagworth was victorious by a short neck.
† The Barb was first past the post but was disqualified for not carrying the correct assigned weight.

== See also ==
- Arrowfield 3YO Sprint
- Australian Oaks
- Percy Sykes Stakes
- Queen of the Turf Stakes
- Sapphire Stakes (ATC)
- South Pacific Classic
- Sydney Cup
- List of Australian Group races
- Group races
