= Bill Waterhouse =

Australian bookmaker (1922–2019)

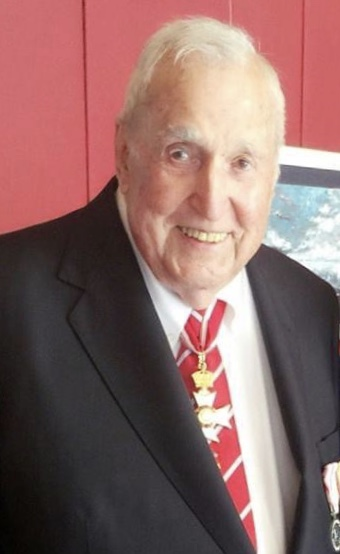
- Born: William Stanley Waterhouse; 22 January 1922
- Died: 22 November 2019 (aged 97); Sydney, New South Wales, Australia
- Education: North Sydney Boys High School
- Alma mater: University of Sydney
- Occupation: Bookmaker
- Children: Robbie Waterhouse
- Relatives: Gai Waterhouse (daughter-in-law); Tom Waterhouse (grandson)

William Stanley Waterhouse (22 January 1922 – 22 November 2019) was an Australian bookmaker, businessman and barrister. Waterhouse was also Tonga's honorary Consul-General in Australia.

== Early years and background ==
Waterhouse was educated at Greenwood Primary School and North Sydney Boys High. He completed an Arts/Law degree at Sydney University in 1948.

== Bookmaking career ==
He had worked as a bookmaker's clerk since 1938 with his father, who was first licensed as a bookmaker in 1898. Waterhouse became a barrister in 1948 but took leave of absence in 1954 after the sudden death of his brother and partner, Charles, and never returned, making bookmaking his full-time career. He worked his way on to the 'rails' (the Australian higher-class, higher-stake betting ring at a racetrack, as compared to bookmakers of the 'paddock'), and rose to be reputed the world's biggest bookmaker and gambler in 1968.

He engaged in betting duels with giant punters such as Frank Duval (Hong Kong Tiger), Filipe Ismael (The Filipino Fireball) and Ray Hopkins. A man of large stature, he was dubbed 'Big Bill' and 'king of the bookies', remaining at the top for over 20 years. Waterhouse often turned over more than the tote.

As the high-profile patriarch of the Waterhouse racing dynasty, he ran his own racing newspaper The Referee and later wrote his own regular newspaper column for The Daily Telegraph, Sunday Telegraph and the Sun. Media coverage of him included articles in The Bulletin, the former National Times, The Sydney Morning Herald Good Weekend and in TV specials such as A Big Country and an interview by David Frost.

Waterhouse represented the Sydney betting ring in Melbourne for a decade from 1959 and also was the first bookmaker to represent Australia at Royal Ascot and other leading English courses in 1967–1968. In 1968, the Victoria Racing Club changed its rules to disallow bookmakers operating in other states fielding on-course bets in Victoria, initiated in part as a result of allegations against Waterhouse that he was taking illegal off-course bets, subsequently dismissed by a Magistrate.

Waterhouse was cleared of rumours surrounding the doping of Melbourne Cup co-favourite, Big Philou in 1969, when it was shown by Australian Jockey Club (AJC) officials he was not working on the race, by then being a Sydney bookmaker and did not stand to lose on Big Philou in the doubles business run by his staff.

Waterhouse was the father of bookmaker Robbie Waterhouse, and the father-in-law of horse trainer Gai Waterhouse. In 1984 Waterhouse and his son Robbie lost their bookmakers' licenses when it was alleged they had 'prior knowledge' of the Fine Cotton ring-in and the AJC revoked their licenses, before waiting for the results of the Queensland police inquiry into the ring-in. However, it was never alleged they had any involvement in the actual ring-in. Waterhouse always maintained his innocence.

He was reinstated as a bookmaker in 2002 at 80 years of age when he announced he was coming back to train his grandson, Tom Waterhouse, as the fourth-generation Waterhouse bookmaker. They became Australia's largest on-course bookmakers in 2007 and 2008.

In 2013, Waterhouse expressed his regret over the public acrimony between Gai Waterhouse, Tom Waterhouse, and John Singleton, as a result of the More Joyous affair.

== Interests outside bookmaking ==
Waterhouse was also a successful commercial and residential property developer and hotelier, building the first strata-titled home unit development in New South Wales and the top hotel licensee in Australia in the 1960s.

Other ventures have included mining licences and international betting shops.

His diplomatic post of Honorary Consul-General for the Kingdom of Tonga arose from a friendship at Sydney University's Law School with the young heir to the throne of Tonga. He has received several awards from Tonga including the Grand Cross of Queen Salote, from King George Tupou V in 2009.

Waterhouse wrote his autobiography, What Are The Odds? which was published by Random House in 2009 and a new edition published in 2010. It was sold out in both hardcover and paperback.
