= Robbie Waterhouse =

Australian businessman

- Occupation: Bookmaker
- Spouse: Gai Waterhouse
- Children: Tom Waterhouse; Kate Waterhouse
- Father: Bill Waterhouse

Gai Waterhouse, Robbie Waterhouse, February 2012

Robert Waterhouse is an Australian racing identity, businessman, form specialist, punter and bookmaker. Waterhouse is the son of Bill Waterhouse, he is married to thoroughbred horse trainer Gai Waterhouse, and is the father of bookmaker Tom Waterhouse.

== Career ==
Waterhouse is a high-profile bookmaker who followed in the traditions of his father, Bill Waterhouse, a leading Sydney bookmaker and barrister. Rob Waterhouse first became a licensed bookmaker in 1972 and has worked in all codes: thoroughbreds; jumping; trotting; pacing, greyhounds; greyhound coursing and quarter horse racing. Following a 17-year break from bookmaking due to the fallout from betting in the Fine Cotton Affair, he returned to the track in 2001.

He is currently licensed to field in NSW, Victoria, QLD, NT, Tasmania and the United Kingdom. Rob Waterhouse is also the only bookmaker since 1910 to be licensed to field in NZ (which normally only allows totalisator betting) - when he fielded to much fanfare during the Waikato Racing Carnival at Te Rapa on 2 February 2002.

In November 2022, Liquor & Gaming NSW confirmed it is prosecuting Waterhouse for alleged breaches of the Betting and Racing Act after he allegedly incentivised a customer to continue punting after they requested their account be closed.

=== Fine Cotton affair ===
Both Bill and Robbie Waterhouse were caught up in the aftermath of the Fine Cotton affair. Bill and Robbie Waterhouse were warned-off racecourses for having prior knowledge of a ring-in being installed in a race. Robbie Waterhouse was disqualified for life from holding a bookmaker's licence and "warned-off" Australian and other racecourses. The ban was lifted in August 2001 and he then successfully re-applied for a licence.

=== Business interests ===
Waterhouse is a company director and owned shares in companies associated with Tom Waterhouse NT, a company licensed as a bookmaker in the Northern Territory, operated by Waterhouse's son, Tom, and Robbie Waterhouse's sister, Louise Raedler Waterhouse. The business was sold to British bookmaker William Hill in 2013.

== See also ==
- Gai Waterhouse
- Bill Waterhouse
- Tom Waterhouse
