= Fine Cotton =

Australian-bred Thoroughbred racehorse

Fine Cotton (29 November 1976 – 20 February 2009) was a brown Australian Thoroughbred gelding which was at the centre of a substitution scam (also known as a ring-in) which occurred on 18 August 1984, in the Commerce Novice (2nd division) Handicap over 1,500 metres at Eagle Farm Racecourse, Brisbane, Queensland. Although there have been many ring-ins and other illegal scams in Australian racing, the Fine Cotton scandal is infamous in Australia due to the involvement of some of racing's elite and its shambolic execution.

Fine Cotton was foaled on 29 November 1976, by Aureo from Cottonpicker by Delta. He was bred by the estate of the late G A Darke and W D Hayne, New South Wales.

== Before the race ==
Fine Cotton was a horse that was racing in the southern areas of Queensland. The horse was eligible to race in restricted races (for horses with fewer than a certain number of wins) and even then had a poor record leading up to the substitution. Before the ring-in, Fine Cotton's last race was in a 1,200m Intermediate Handicap at a Doomben Wednesday meeting on 8 August 1984, where he carried 53.5 kg and started at 20–1. He ran 10th in a field of 12.

The scam involved a syndicate said to be headed by former bloodstock agent John Gillespie, which purchased a horse that looked almost identical to Fine Cotton and performed better. Unfortunately for the syndicate, this horse (Dashing Soltaire) was injured and unable to race when the ring-in was due to take place. Having already invested money and gone so far, the syndicate decided to find another horse. With time running out, they purchased a horse called Bold Personality, an open-class horse several grades above Fine Cotton.

The syndicate faced a problem in that the horses were different colours. Fine Cotton was an eight-year-old brown gelding and had white markings on his hind legs, whereas Bold Personality was a seven-year-old bay gelding with no markings. To overcome this problem, they applied Clairol hair colouring to Bold Personality with limited success. On race day, having forgotten the peroxide to whiten the legs of Bold Personality, they resorted to crudely applied white paint. These poorly conceived attempts to overcome the discrepancies in appearance between the two horses later served to highlight the amateurish nature of the scheme.

== Race day ==
The syndicate entered Fine Cotton in a race at Eagle Farm on 18 August 1984. The event chosen was a novice handicap for horses that had won fewer than a set number of races.

A horse of Bold Personality's ability was not eligible to race in a restricted novice handicap because he was considered to be an open class horse. Even allowing for the restricted class, Fine Cotton was in such poor form that he was considered to have an outside chance of winning and opened in the betting at odds of 33–1.

As betting continued, money began to be invested on Fine Cotton both at Eagle Farm and at other tracks and TABs throughout the country. Such was the avalanche of money that Fine Cotton/Bold Personality eventually started at 7/2 ($4.50).

It is believed the conspirators would have netted more than A$1.5 million if the ring-in had proved successful. This scale of betting plunge was highly unusual, so racing stewards were already suspicious before the race. Bookmakers in Sydney had noticed the unusual change in the odds and voiced their concerns. The word ring-in was mentioned, but nothing was raised with the stewards. By the time the horses had reached the barrier, the whisper had become something more.

== The race ==
The 2nd Novice Handicap would in ordinary circumstances have been a forgettable event if not for the substitution. The horses entered were up-and-coming horses or older horses of limited ability such as Fine Cotton. The syndicate then waited for the race.

The ring-in began slowly, but was quick to pick up pace. The jockey was surprised at how easily the horse worked its way into the race. By the time they reached the corner, the event was a race in two. The early favourite Harbour Gold, which had drifted from fractional odds to 5–1, clung to the rail, and Bold Personality, racing as Fine Cotton and ridden by apprentice Gus Philpot, claimed him on the outside.

From this point on, the race was close. First one then the other hit the front until right on the line, where the ring-in stuck his head out and won by only a short half head from Harbour Gold.

Even if he had lost, the suspicions raised would have uncovered the scam. As it was, inquiries were already being undertaken as the place-getters returned to scale.

== Post-race ==
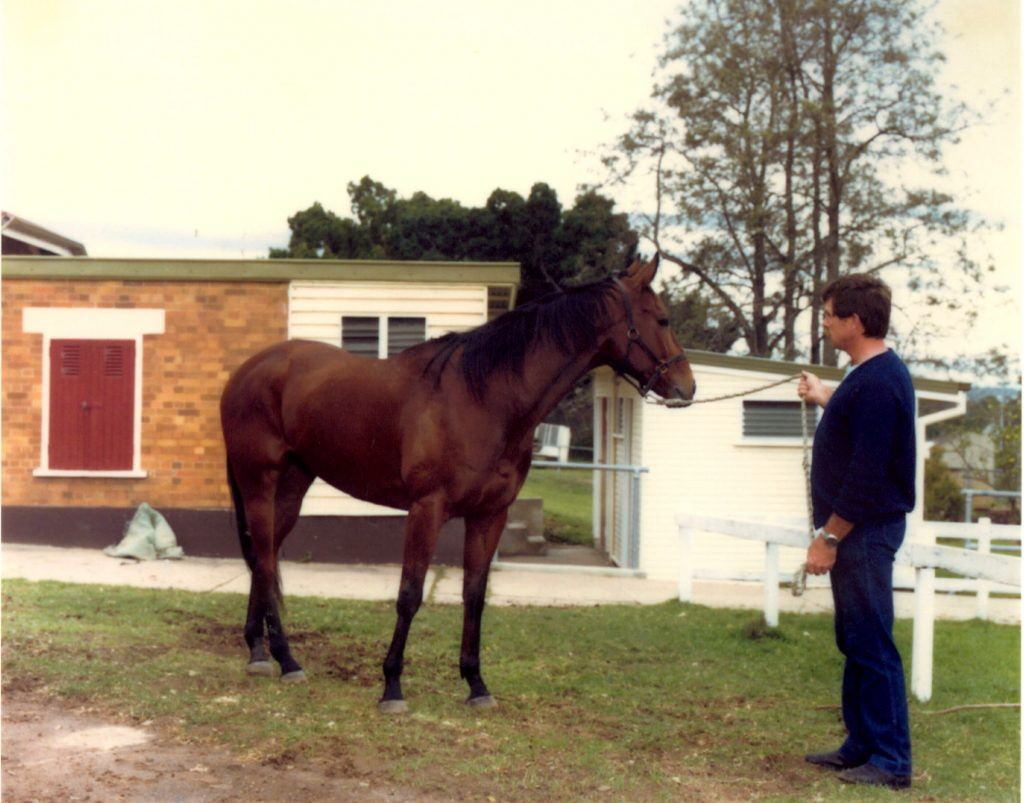
Bold Personality, whilst being held as an exhibit at the Mounted Police Unit, Oxley, with Senior Constable Ian Johnston

Suspicious after the huge betting plunge and the seemingly dramatic improvement made by Fine Cotton, racing stewards launched an immediate investigation. As Bold Personality returned to scale, the paint was beginning to run on his leg, something obvious to those nearby. Several members of the crowd began to shout "ring-in". Stewards stopped payment of bets in the race while they spoke to Fine Cotton's trainer, Hayden Haitana. They requested the registration papers for Fine Cotton so that they could verify the identity of the race winner; however, Haitana absconded from the track without complying with this request and the scam began to fall apart. Bold Personality—alias Fine Cotton—was disqualified, and an official inquiry was opened. With the disqualification, runner-up Harbour Gold was awarded the race, and the many punters who had backed Fine Cotton did not receive any money.

== Aftermath ==
As a result of the official inquiry, the Queensland Turf Club, the State's principal racing club, "warned off" (banned) six people for life. They were the organiser John Gillespie, horse trainer Hayden Haitana, businessman Robert North, electrical technician Tommaso Di Luzio, and salesman John Dixon. Gillespie and Haitana also served jail terms.

In 1998, after being banned for 14 years, Bill and Robbie Waterhouse were allowed back on to Australian racecourses. In November 2013, trainer Hayden Haitana's lifetime ban from entering any racecourse in Australia was lifted by the Queensland All Codes Racing Industry Board which agreed to recommendations made by stewards and the Queensland Thoroughbred Racing Board that Haitana have his warning off removed.

The jockey involved, Gus Philpot, was exonerated by the course stewards and continued to ride at race meetings in eastern Australia. As of December 2014, he was a horse trainer with stables in rural Victoria.

Fine Cotton died on 20 February 2009, aged 32.
