= Ajax =

Ajax may refer to:

== Greek mythology and tragedy ==
- Ajax the Great, son of King Telamon and Periboea
- Ajax the Lesser, son of Oileus, the king of Locris
- Ajax (play), by the ancient Greek tragedian Sophocles, about Ajax the Great

== Arts and entertainment ==
=== Fictional characters ===
- Ajax Duckman, in the animated television series Duckman
- Marvel Comics:
  - Ajax the Greater, another name for Ajak, one of the Eternals
  - Ajax the Lesser, another name for Arex, one of the Eternals
  - Ajax, a member of the Pantheon
  - Ajax (Francis Freeman), a supervillain
- Martian Manhunter, a DC Comics superhero called Ajax in Brazil and Portugal
- Ajax, a Call of Duty: Black Ops 4 operative
- Ajax, the real name of Tartaglia, in the 2020 video game Genshin Impact
- Ajax Petropolus, in the TV series Wednesday

=== Music ===
- A-Jax (band), a South Korean boy band
- Ajax (band), an electronic music band from New York City
- Ajax (opera), by the French composer Toussaint Bertin de la Doué
- DJ Ajax (1971–2013; born Adrian Thomas), an Australian electro mashup DJ
- Lisa Ajax (born 1998), Swedish singer
- "Ajax" (song), by Tante Leen, 1969
- Ajax Records, a former North American record company

=== Other arts and entertainment ===
- Ajax (painting), by John Steuart Curry
- Ajax (Disney), a fictional company (the Disney equivalent of Looney Tunes' Acme Corporation)
- A-Jax (video game), a 1987 Konami arcade game

== Computing ==
- Ajax (floppy disk controller), fitted to the Atari STE
- Ajax (programming), Asynchronous JavaScript and XML, a method used in web application development, and a software framework for it

== Places ==
=== Canada ===
- Ajax (federal electoral district), in the Durham Region of Ontario
- Ajax (provincial electoral district), in Ontario
- Ajax, Ontario, a town in the Greater Toronto Area

=== United States ===
- Ajax, Louisiana, an unincorporated community
- Ajax, Missouri, a ghost town
- Ajax Peak, a summit near Telluride, Colorado
- Ajax, South Dakota, an unincorporated community
- Ajax, Utah, a ghost town
- Ajax, Virginia, an unincorporated community
- Ajax, West Virginia, an unincorporated community
- Aspen Mountain (Colorado), also known as Ajax Mountain

=== Elsewhere ===
- Mount Ajax, part of the Admiralty Mountains, Victoria Land, Antarctic
- 1404 Ajax, an asteroid

== People ==
- Ajax (missionary), Arian missionary who converted the Suevi to Christianity (c. 466)
- Ajax Bukana (d. 2006), Ghanaian state comedian
- Ajax Delgado (1941–1960), Nicaraguan student activist
- Sidney William Jackson (1873–1946), Australian naturalist and ornithologist (pen name "Ajax")
- Heinrich Bleichrodt (1909–1977), German World War II U-boat commander, nicknamed "Ajax"

== Sport ==
=== Association football (soccer) ===
- AFC Ajax, a football club in Amsterdam, the Netherlands
- Ajax Cape Town F.C., a South African football club
- Ajax Futebol Clube, a Brazilian football club
- Ajax de Ouenzé, a Congolese football club
- FC Ajax Lasnamäe, an Estonian football club
- Ajax Orlando Prospects, American soccer team from Orlando, Florida, a.k.a. Ajax America
- Ajax America Women, American women's soccer team from California
- Aias Salamina F.C., a football club in Salamina, Greece
- Ajax Sportsman Combinatie, a cricket and football club in Leiden, the Netherlands
- Rabat Ajax F.C., a Maltese football club
- Unión Ájax, a football club in Trujillo, Honduras
- V.V. Ajax, a Surinamese football club

=== Other sports ===
- Aias Evosmou, a Greek sports club
- Ajax København, a Danish handball team
- Ajax (horse) (born 1901), a French Champion racehorse
- Ajax II (born 1934), an Australian Champion racehorse

== Military ==
- HMS Ajax, several ships of the Royal Navy
- USS Ajax, several ships of the US Navy
- General Dynamics Ajax, a family of armoured fighting vehicles for the British Army
- Operation Ajax, the 1953 Iranian coup d'état

== Transport ==
=== Motor vehicles ===
- Ajax (1906 automobile), a Swiss automobile
- Ajax (1913 automobile), a French automobile by the American Briscoe brothers
- Ajax (1914 automobile), an American automobile by Ajax Motors Co. of Seattle, Washington
- AJAX Engineering, an Indian concrete construction machinery company
- Ajax (Nash Motors), an automobile brand of Nash Motors, 1925–1926
- Ajax Motors Co., an American carmaker, manufacturer of the Ajax (1914 automobile)

=== Railway ===
- Ajax (locomotive), several train locomotives
- Ajax GO Station, a train and bus station in Ajax, Ontario, Canada

=== Other transport ===
- Ajax (motorcycle), manufactured in England between 1923 and 1924
- Ajax (crane barge), a floating crane used to install the Panama Canal locks
- Ajax (ship), various ships

== Other uses ==
- AFC Ajax N.V., a sports company associated with AFC Ajax
- Ajax, a taxonomic synonym for the plant genus Narcissus
- Ajax (cleaning product), a brand of household cleaning products
- AJAX furnace, a type of open hearth furnace
- Ajax High School, a public high school in Ajax, Ontario, Canada

== See also ==
- Ajax Mine (disambiguation)
- Ayaks (disambiguation) (Russian: Аякс, romanized: Ayaks, lit. 'Ajax')
- Nike Ajax, the world's first operational surface-to-air missile
- Jax (disambiguation)
