= Ajax Stakes =

Horse race in Sydney, New South Wales

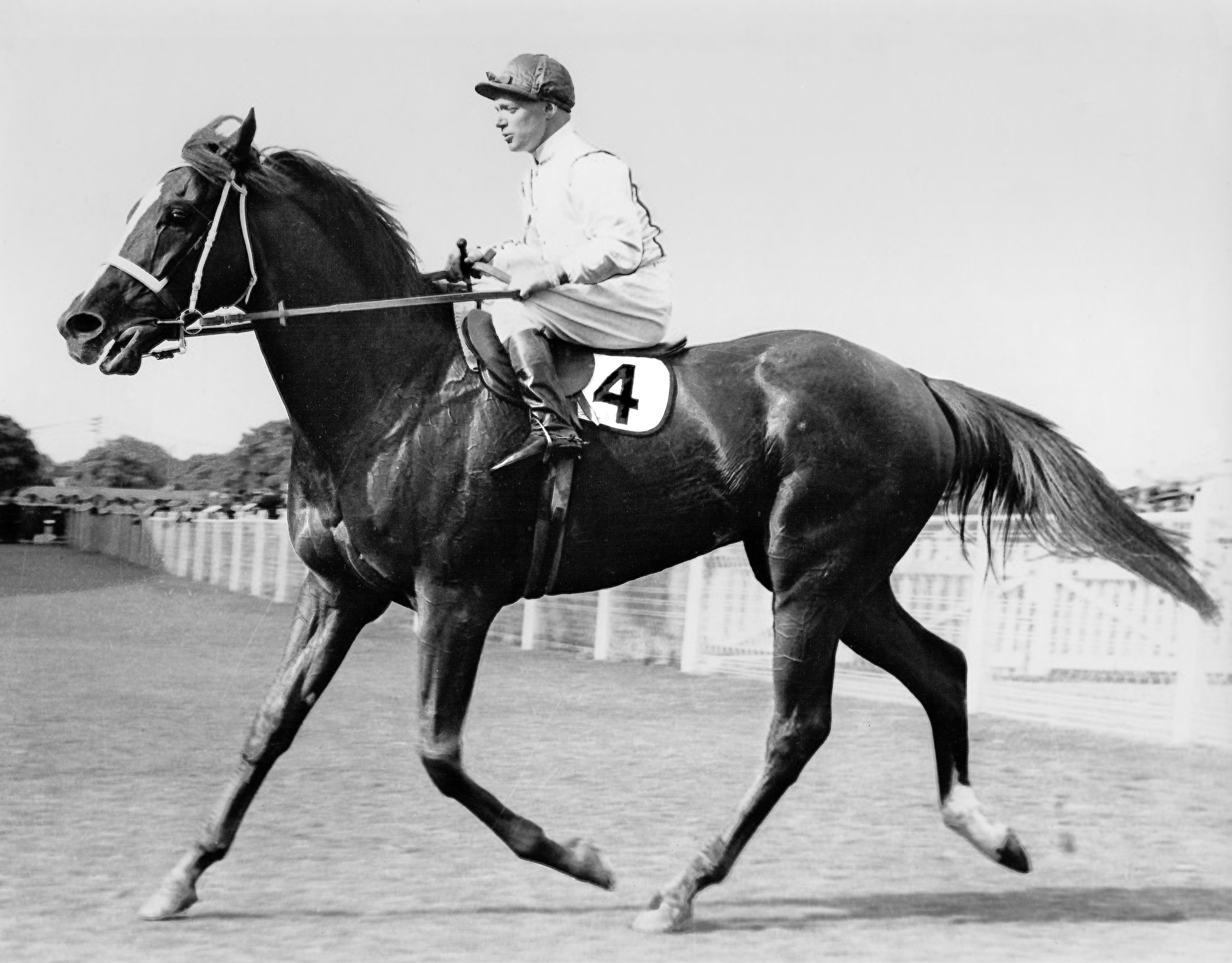
- Ajax and Harold Badger.
- Class: Group 2
- Location: Rosehill Gardens Racecourse
- Inaugurated: 1974
- Race type: Thoroughbred – Flat racing
- Sponsor: Hyland Race Colours (2008-26)

Race information
- Distance: 1,500 metres
- Surface: Turf
- Track: Right-handed
- Qualification: Three-year-olds and older
- Weight: Quality handicap
- Purse: A$300,000 (2026)

The Ajax Stakes is an Australian Turf Club Group 2 Thoroughbred quality handicap horse race, for horses aged three years old and upwards, over a distance of 1500 metres, held annually at Rosehill Racecourse in Sydney, Australia in March.

== History ==
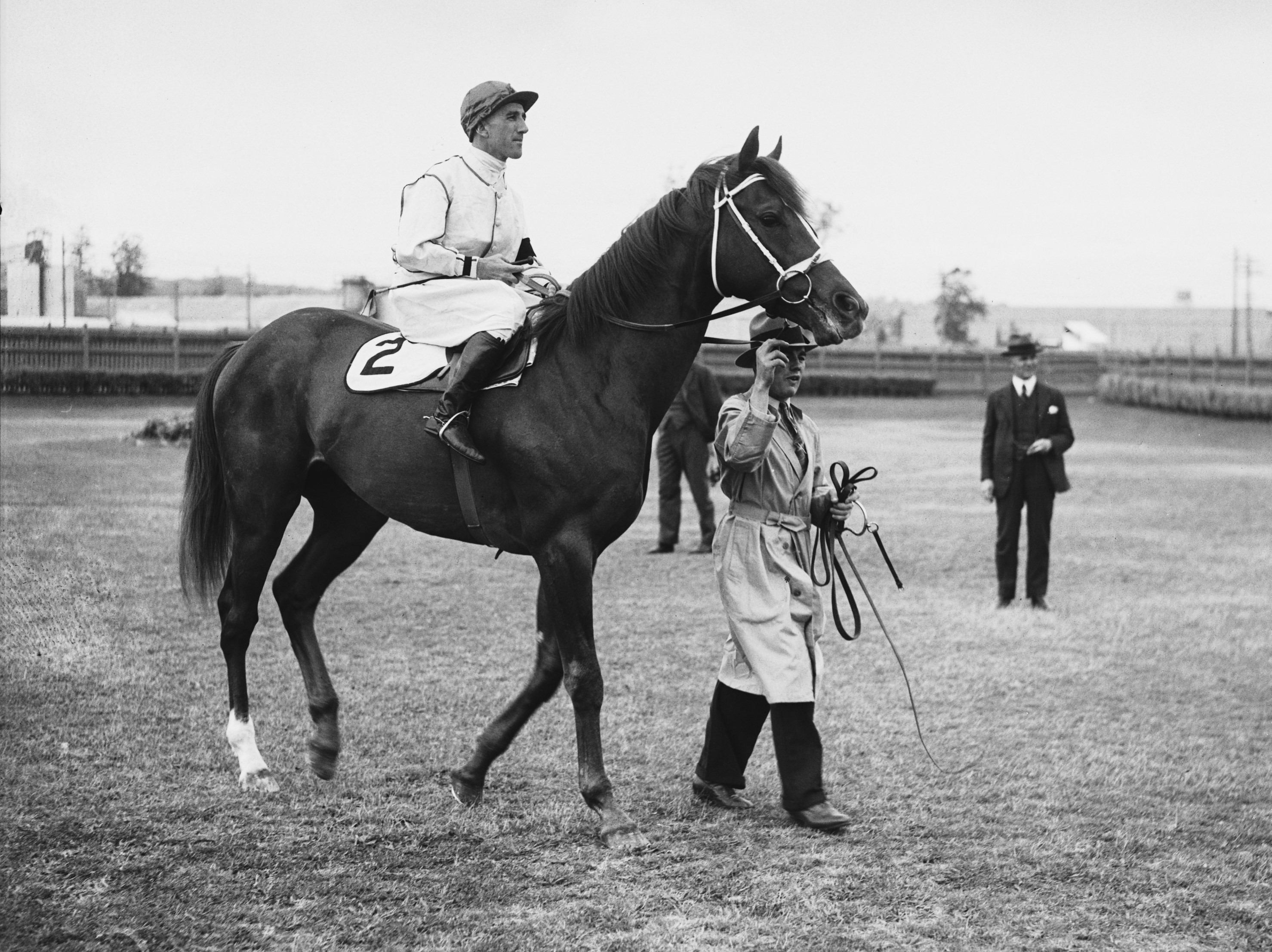
Ajax, and Maurice McCarten Rosehill 1937

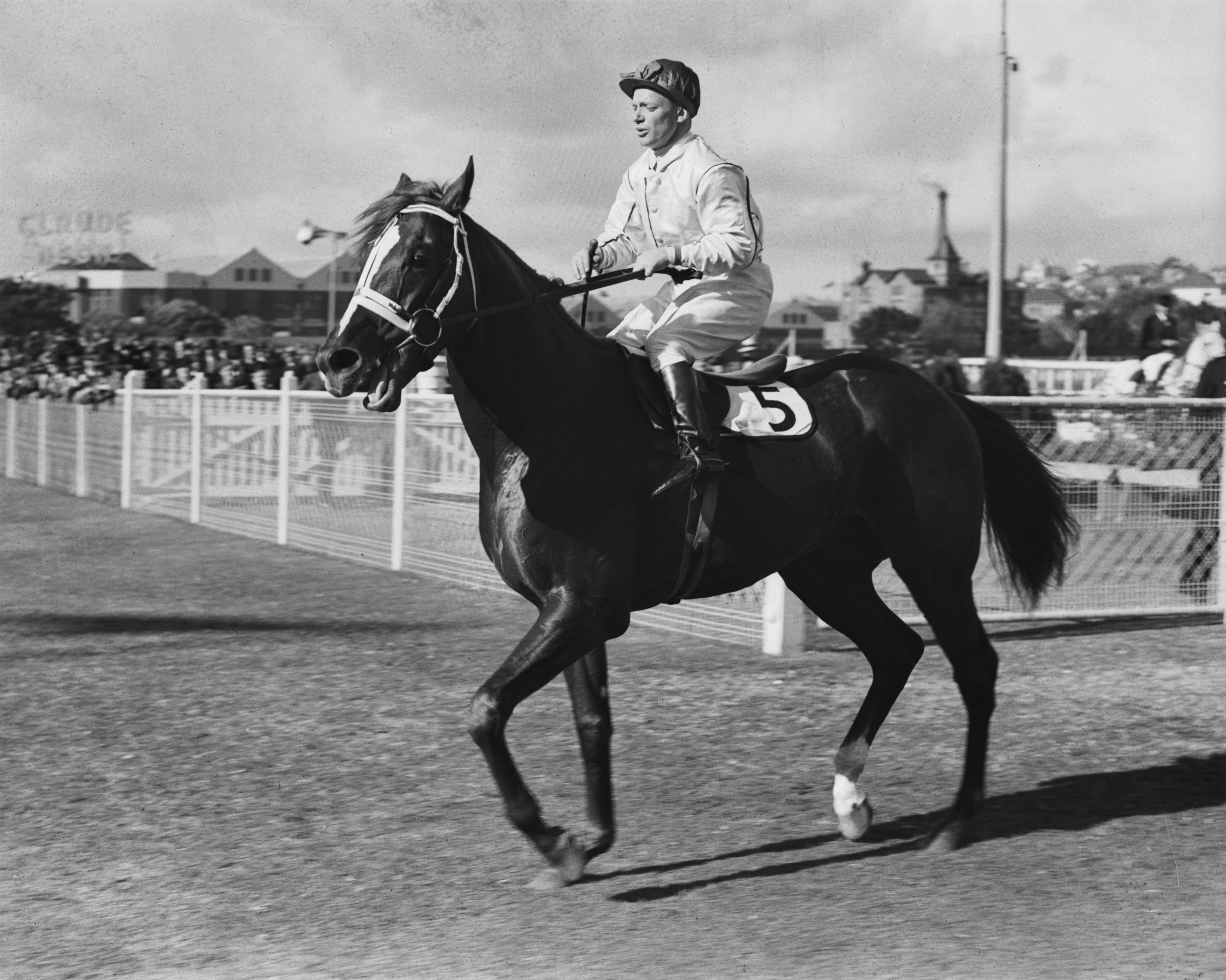
Ajax, and Harold Badger Randwick 1938

=== Name ===
The race is named for the outstanding Hall of Fame horse and 1938 Cox Plate winner Ajax.

- 1974–1983 - Ajax Stakes
- 1984 - Sir Robert Askin Cup
- 1985–1991 - Diners' Club Cup
- 1992 - Ajax Stakes
- 1993 - Sydney Turf Club 50th Anniversary Stakes
- 1994–1995 - Ajax Stakes
- 1996 - Konica Stakes
- 1997 - Ajax Stakes
- 1998 - Parramatta Leagues Club Stakes
- 1999 - Ajax Stakes
- 2000–2002 - Parramatta Leagues Club Stakes
- 2003 onwards - Ajax Stakes

=== Distance ===
- 1974–1978 – 1200 metres
- 1979–1983 – 1400 metres
- 1984 onwards - 1500 metres

=== Grade ===
- 1974–1979 - Principal race
- 1980–1983 - Listed race
- 1984–2005 - Group 3
- 2006 onwards - Group 2 race

== Winners ==
Past winners of the race are as follows.

- 2026 - Cristal Clear
- 2025 - Iowna Merc
- 2024 - Democracy Manifest
- 2023 - Cepheus
- 2022 - Just Folk
- 2021 - I Am Superman
- 2020 - Imaging
- 2019 - Fifty Stars
- 2018 - Comin' Through
- 2017 - It's Somewhat
- 2016 - It's Somewhat
- 2015 - Burbero
- 2014 - Messene
- 2013 - Havana Rey
- 2012 - Niagara
- 2011 - Pureness
- 2010 - Brilliant Light
- 2009 - Solo Flyer
- 2008 - All Silent
- 2007 - High Cee
- 2006 - Malcolm
- 2005 - River To The Sea
- 2004 - True Glo
- 2003 - Grand Armee
- 2002 - Mowerman
- 2001 - Galiano
- 2000 - Normal Practice
- 1999 - Confiscate
- 1998 - Confiscate
- 1997 - Catalan Opening
- 1996 - Catalan Opening
- 1995 - Protara's Bay
- 1994 - Poetic King
- 1993 - Soho Square
- 1992 - Alderson
- 1991 - From The Planet
- 1990 - Windsor's Pal
- 1989 - Jondolar
- 1988 - Imprimatur
- 1987 - Mac's Treasure
- 1986 - Sea Pictures
- 1985 - Royal Troubador
- 1984 - Vite Cheval
- 1983 - C'Est Si Bon
- 1982 - Winter's Dance
- 1981 - Thumb Print
- 1980 - Lowan Star
- 1979 - Lloyd Boy
- 1978 - Count Rajan
- 1977 - Tiger Town
- 1976 - Wayne's Bid
- 1975 - Helmsman
- 1974 - Tontonan

== See also ==
- List of Australian Group races
- Group races
