= AJAX Engineering =

Indian concrete construction machinery company

AJAX Engineering Limited

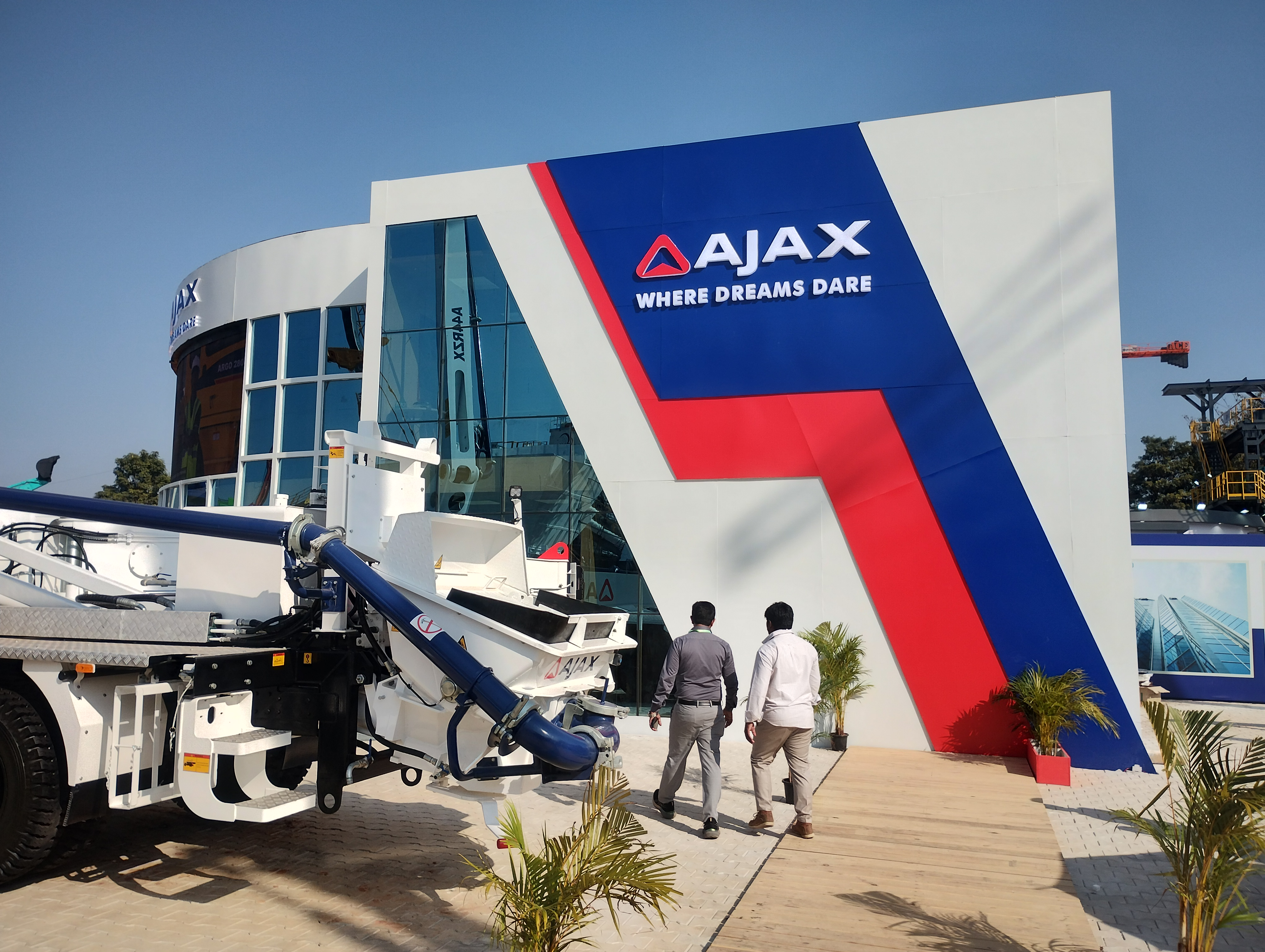
- AJAX Engineering at EXCON 2025, BIEC
- Company type: Public limited
- Industry: Concrete, concrete machines
- Founded: 1992 in Bangalore, India
- Headquarters: Peenya Industrial Area,, Bangalore, India
- Area served: Bangladesh, Sri-Lanka, Myanmar, Mozambique, Philippines, Kenya, Tunisia, UAE, Vietnam, Cambodia, Oman, Uganda, and Egypt
- Parent: Fiori Group
- Divisions: 3 (Doddaballapura, Gauribidanur)
- Website: www.ajax-engg.com

AJAX Engineering is an Indian concrete construction machinery company.

== Company ==
AJAX Engineering is a joint venture of Fiori Group.

It is the first Indian concreting equipment manufacturer to export Slip-Form Paver.

== Media gallery ==
AJAX Engineering at EXCON 2025, BIEC
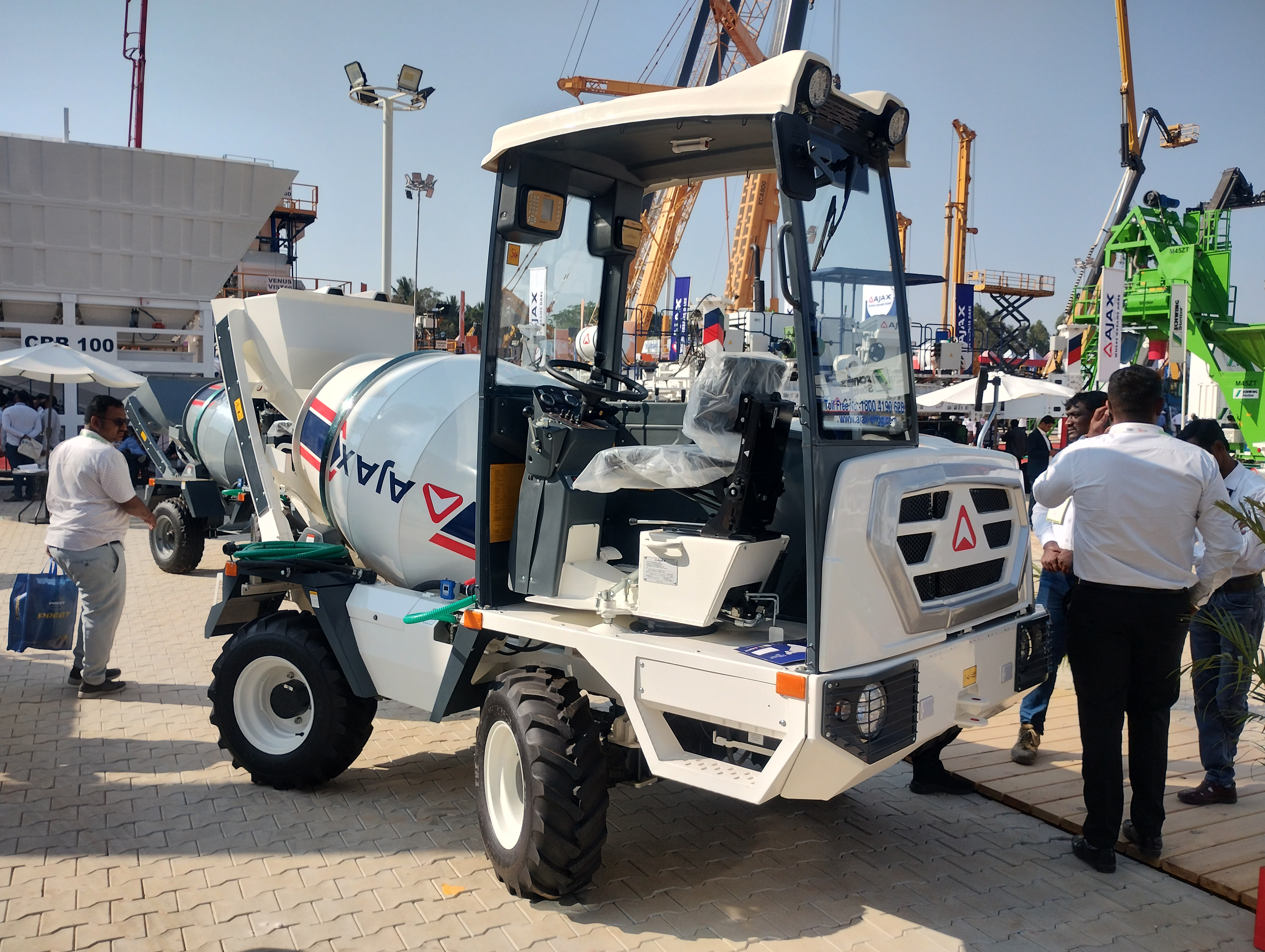

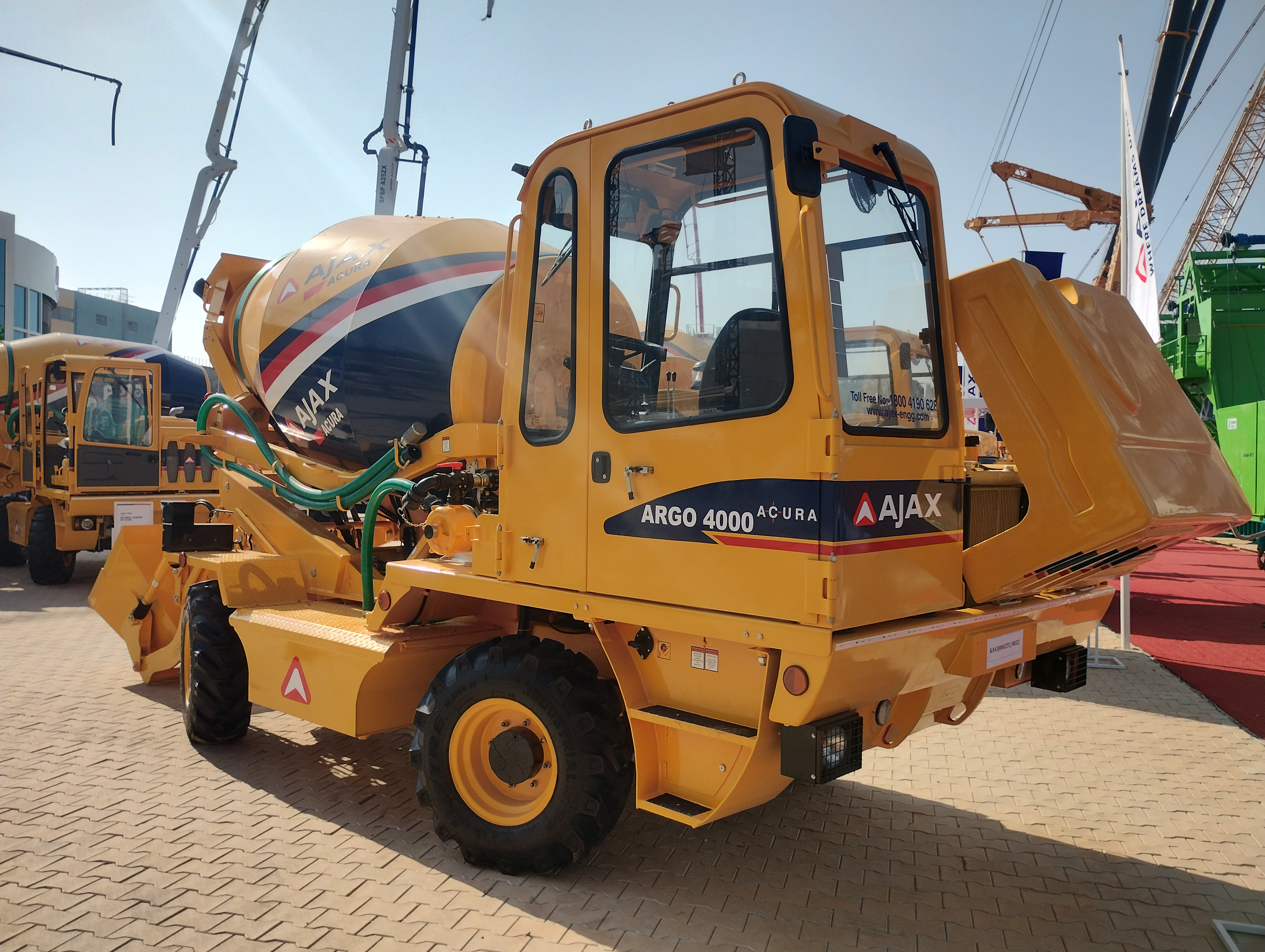

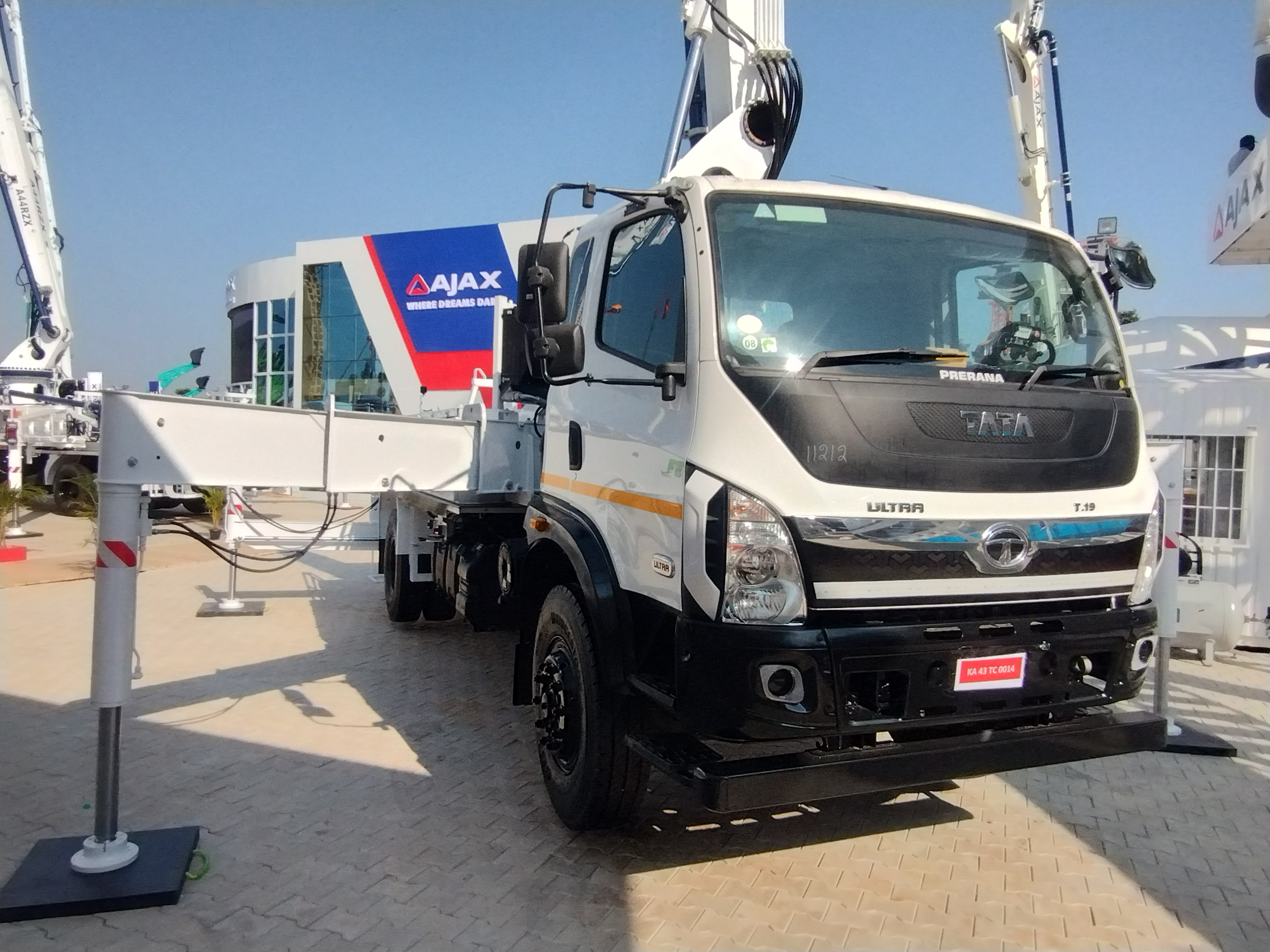

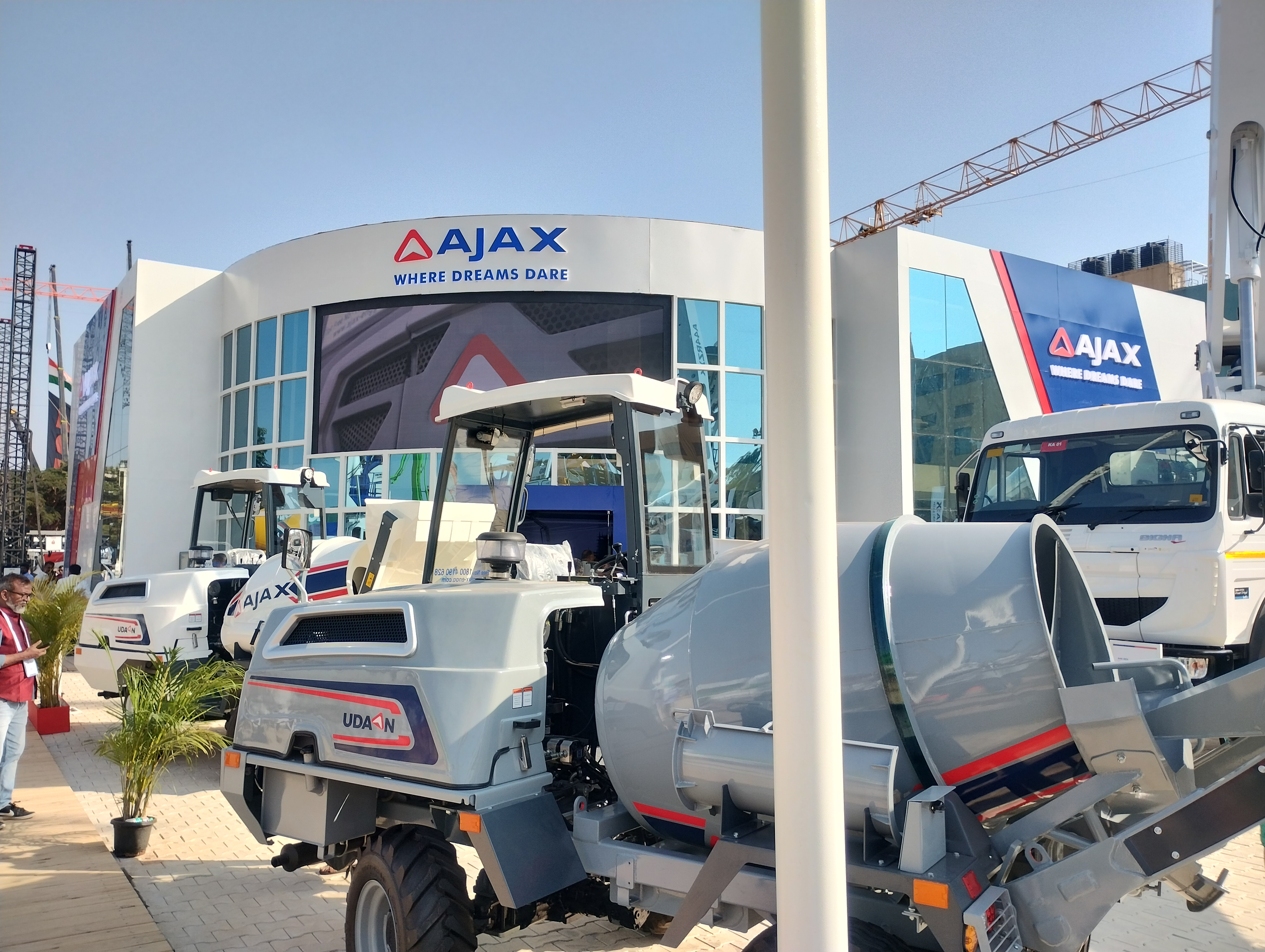

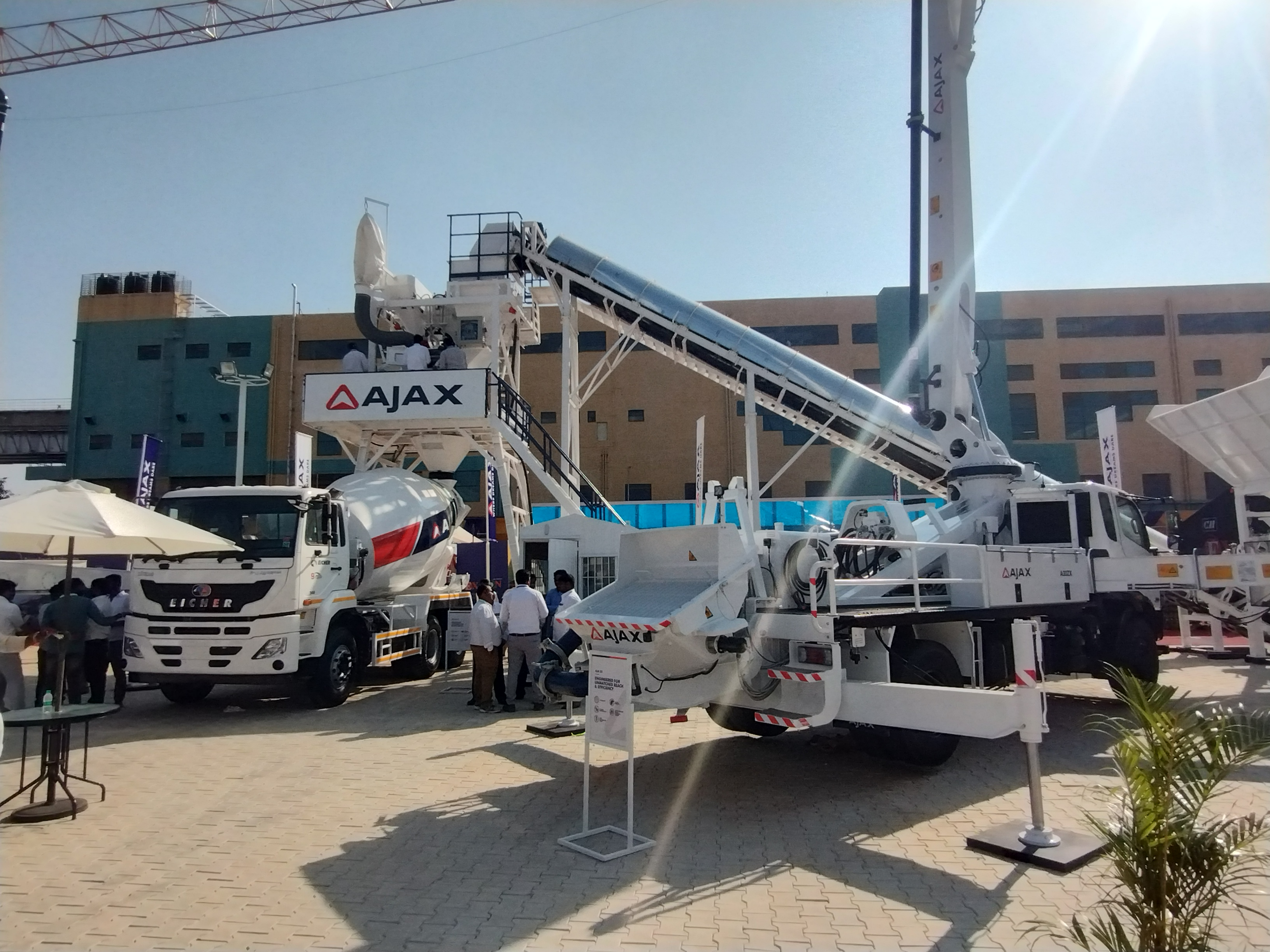
