= Ajax (ship) =

Several ships have been named Ajax for Ajax the Great, a figure from Greek mythology:

- Ajax (1759 EIC ship), of 655 tons (bm), was built by Perry, Blackwall. She sailed for the British East India Company until a French warship captured her in 1761. The French East India Company purchased her and she sailed for them until 1776.
- Ajax (1811 ship) was launched at South Shields. She was condemned at Calcutta in 1822.
- Ajax (1835 ship), of 30337/94 tons (bm), was built by Hillhouse, Hill and Co., of Bristol. She was wrecked at Cindadella, Minorca, on 3 December 1862.
- Ajax (1864 ship) - a screw steamer that provided logistical support to the Union Army during the Civil War, and commercial passenger and freight service on the Pacific Coast afterward.

== Others ==
- SS Ajax – One of four steamships
- HMS Ajax – One of eight vessels of the Royal Navy
- USS Ajax – One of four vessels of the United States Navy
- Dutch corvette Ajax (1796) - built by P. Schuijt jr at naval yard at Harlingen and broken up 1824
- French ship Ajax – One of three ships of the French Navy

== See also ==
- Ajax (crane barge), a floating crane used to install the Panama Canal locks
- Ajax (disambiguation)
