= SS Ajax =

Several steamships have borne the name Ajax:

- SS Ajax (1867) was one of the first steamships that were fuel efficient enough to trade between the UK and China.
- SS Ajax (1889) was a Danish cargo ship sunk by a German U-boat in 1917.
- SS Ajax (1904) was a Norwegian cargo ship sunk by a German U-boat in 1917.
- SS Ajax (1923) was a Dutch cargo ship sunk by German bombers in 1940.

== See also ==
- Ajax (ship)
