= French ship Ajax =

At least three ships of the French Navy have been named Ajax

- French ship Ajax (1779), a 64-gun ship of the line acquired in 1779
- French ship Ajax (1806), a 74-gun ship of the line launched in 1806
- French submarine Ajax (1930), a submarine launched in 1930 and scuttled in 1940

== See also ==
- Ajax (ship)
