= Ajax Bukana =

Ajax Bukana was the first Ghanaian state comedian.

== Career ==
Born James Kehinde Ajayi, Ajax Bukana was a Nigerian musician and comedian who played with Nigerian musicians such as Bobby Benson in Nigeria. He was an octobassist before settling in Ghana in 1952. In Accra, Ghana, he began finding fame in 1958 for his juggling aerobatics, jokes and dance. He was the leader of the jive dancers who welcomed the noted American jazz musician Louis Armstrong to Ghana on his Africa tour. He caught the eye of Ghana's first president Kwame Nkrumah. In 1963, Nkrumah sent Ajax Bukana to the Russian Circus School. He was to train for a year and assumed the headship of the national circus in Ghana. He, however, became Ghana's national comedian in 1964. Through this role, he met and entertained many guests on national visits. He was briefly imprisoned following Nkrumah's overthrow in 1966.

He established the satirical political party the Mosquito Production Party in 1969 in the run up to Ghana's national elections. He served as the MC for the Ramblers International Band's concert at Star Hotel in 1976.

== Death ==
Ajax Bukana died at the age of 89 in 2006 in Accra.
