= Ajax Delgado =

Ajax Delgado Lopez (July 14, 1941 – September 5, 1960) was a Nicaraguan student opponent of the Somoza dynasty, which imprisoned and then killed him.

== Biography ==
Delagdo the son of a wealthy coffee grower in northern Nicaragua, Santiago Delgado Guevara and his mother was Luz Lopez Rivera. Ajax Delgado was born in Jinotega, Nicaragua, July 14, 1941, and was murdered September 5, 1960. He had one brother, Ruy Delgado Lopez, born in Managua, Nicaragua, June 22, 1949, and five sisters. At a very young age, he became a student activist against the Somoza regime. Delgado also spent a year in Georgetown University. His father was a former member of the National Guard trained by the United States Marines during the Sandino period. Around the time when Anastasio Somoza García seized power of the National Guard, Ajax's father, Santiago Delgado, conspired with his brother, Edmundo Delgado, and Abelardo Cuadra, among other National Guard members, to overthrow Somoza from power.

The plot was discovered and the Delgado brothers and the other conspirators were thrown in jail under threat of execution. Somoza later released the conspirators, but from that moment on all the conspirators became enemies of the regime and were under constant surveillance. Many went into exile to avoid the threats and harassment from the Somoza regime.

Ajax Delgado was captured after participating in "illegal" demonstrations, but he was also implicated in a bombing that claimed the life of a watchman guarding "Casa Pellas", a business of a major Managua businessman. Santiago Delgado (who died in 2012 at the age of 99) begged Somoza to let his son go. Somoza promised him that nothing was going to happen to his son, and that he would indeed release him. Instead, Somoza ordered a plot to entice Delgado to escape using an opening in the ceiling of his cell, which he did. It was a dark night and a guard posted on the rooftop was ordered to shoot Delgado as an opportunity presented itself. As Delgado looked for a way off the roof onto the street, the guard shot him, the bullet entering his face through one eye. As this was an explosive round, the back of his head was blown into pieces. Years later, someone testified that guard that killed Delgado told him that when he confronted Delgado in the rooftop of the prison, he said to him: "Asi te queria agarrar, Chelito" (that's how I wanted to get you, blondie), referring to his white skin and blond hair. Delgado died instantly.

Delgado was 18 years old when he was imprisoned and reached his 19th birthday while in jail. His body was then put in a bag and thrown on top of a military vehicle and later dumped in the street where his parents lived. His family was expecting his release but was choked to find out that Delgado had died while "escaping" from prison. The guard later died in a "bar brawl".

During the Sandinista revolution, Delgado was considered a martyr. In Managua, the capital of Nicaragua, there is a police station and a gymnasium run by the government that bear his name.

Delgado was a typical member of the several student organizations opposing the Somoza regime. Many of these students came from middle- and upper-middle-class families. Many of them were killed or tortured under Somoza's repressive government.
