= Ajax, Missouri =

Ghost town in Missouri, USA

Coordinates: 36°47′23″N 90°4′18″W

Ajax is an extinct town in Stoddard County, in the U.S. state of Missouri.

Ajax was founded circa 1819, and named after Ajax, a character in Greek mythology.
