= Fiori Group =

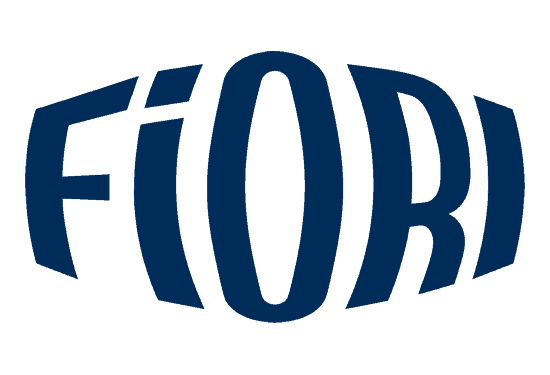

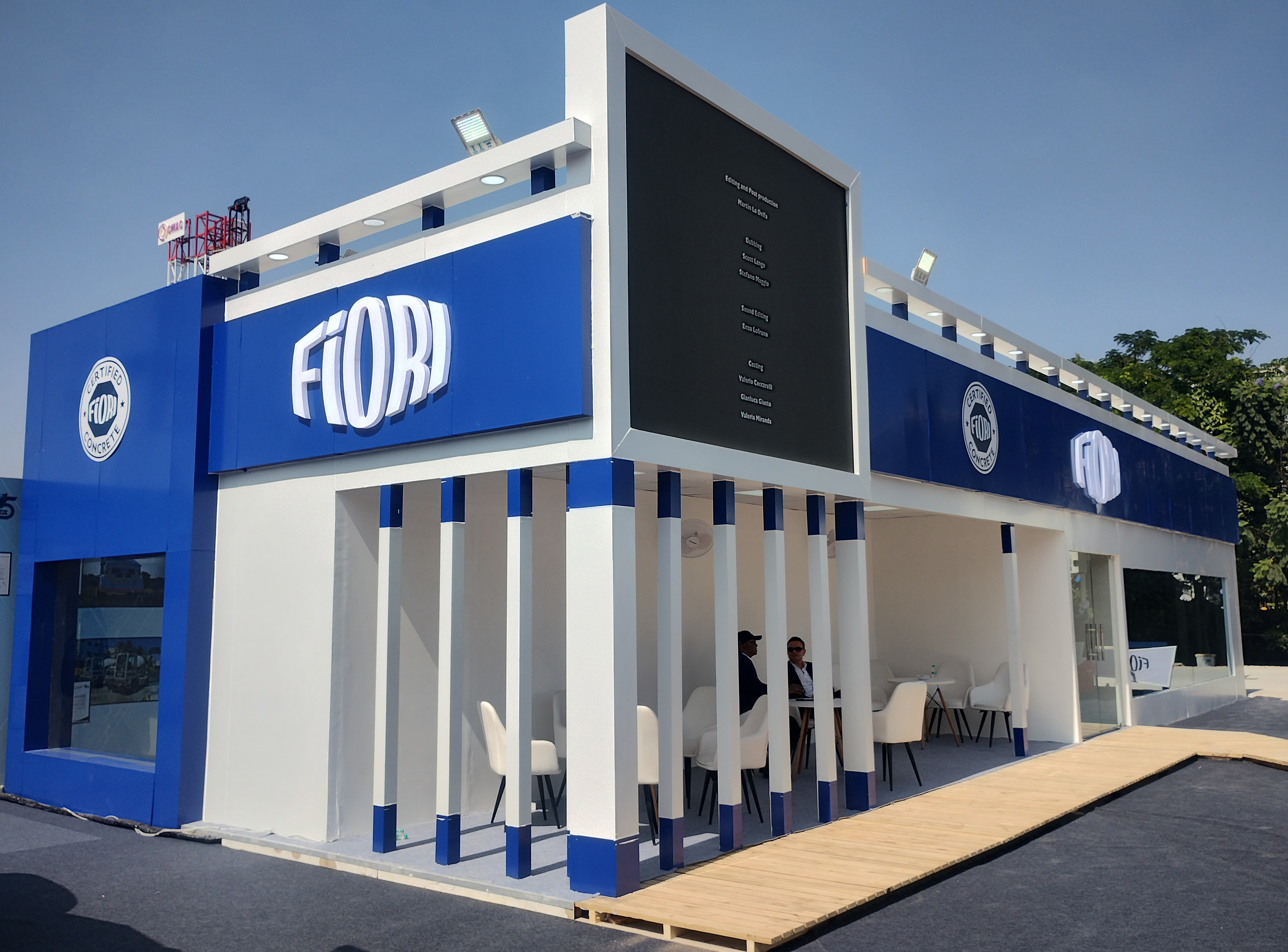
- Fiori India at EXCON 2025, BIEC
- Trade name: Fiori
- Company type: S.p.A. (public limited company)
- Genre: Concrete, concrete machines
- Incorporated: Italy
- Founded: 1942 in Italy
- Founder: Fioravante Malavolta
- Headquarters: Finale Emilia, Province of Modena, Italy
- Website: www.fiorigroup.com/it/

Fiori Group is an Italian worldwide manufacturer of concrete machines, headquartered in Finale Emilia.

Fiori Group was founded in 1942, by Fioravante Malavolta.

== Media gallery ==
Fiori India at EXCON 2025, Bangalore International Exhibition Centre
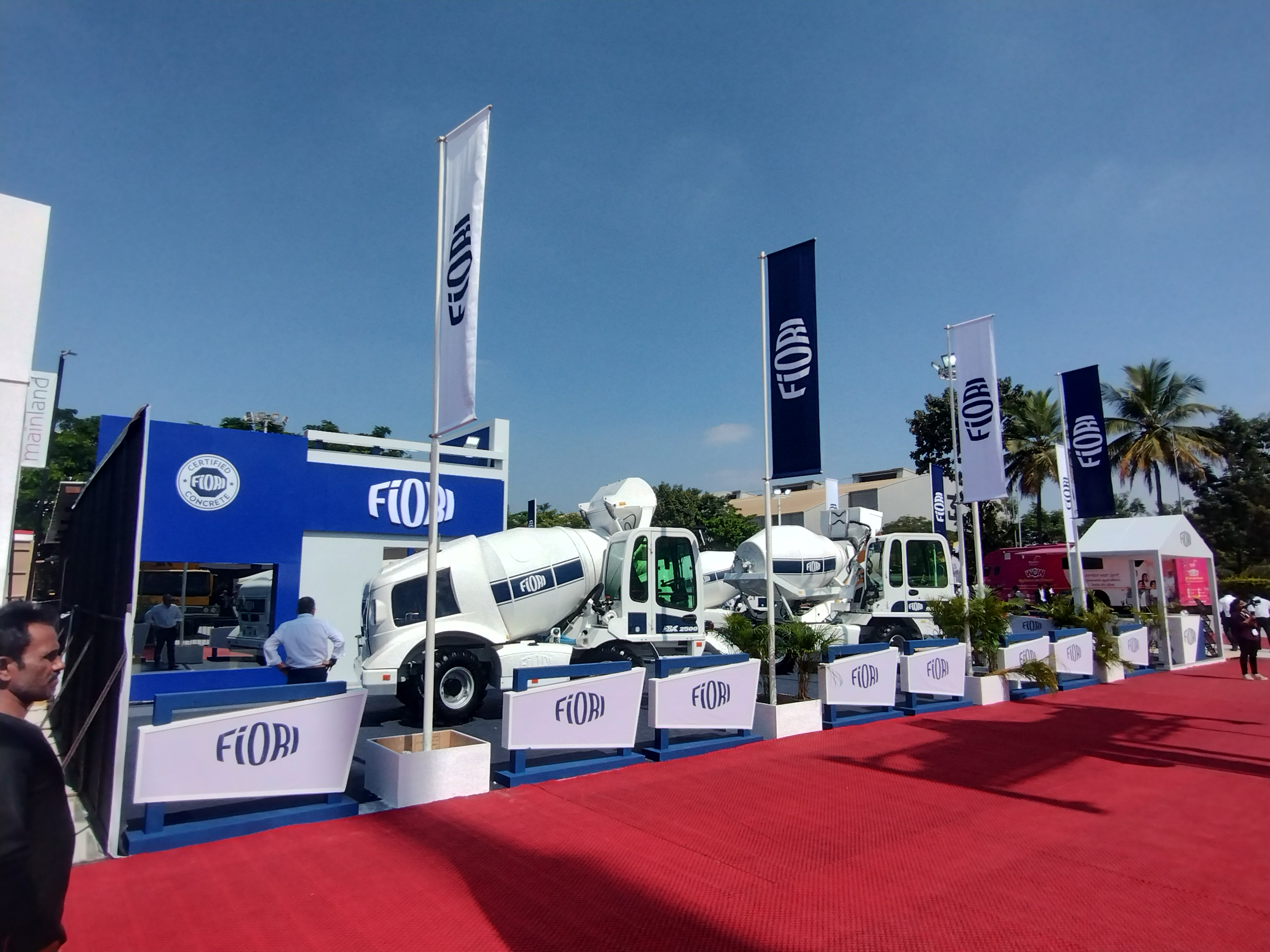

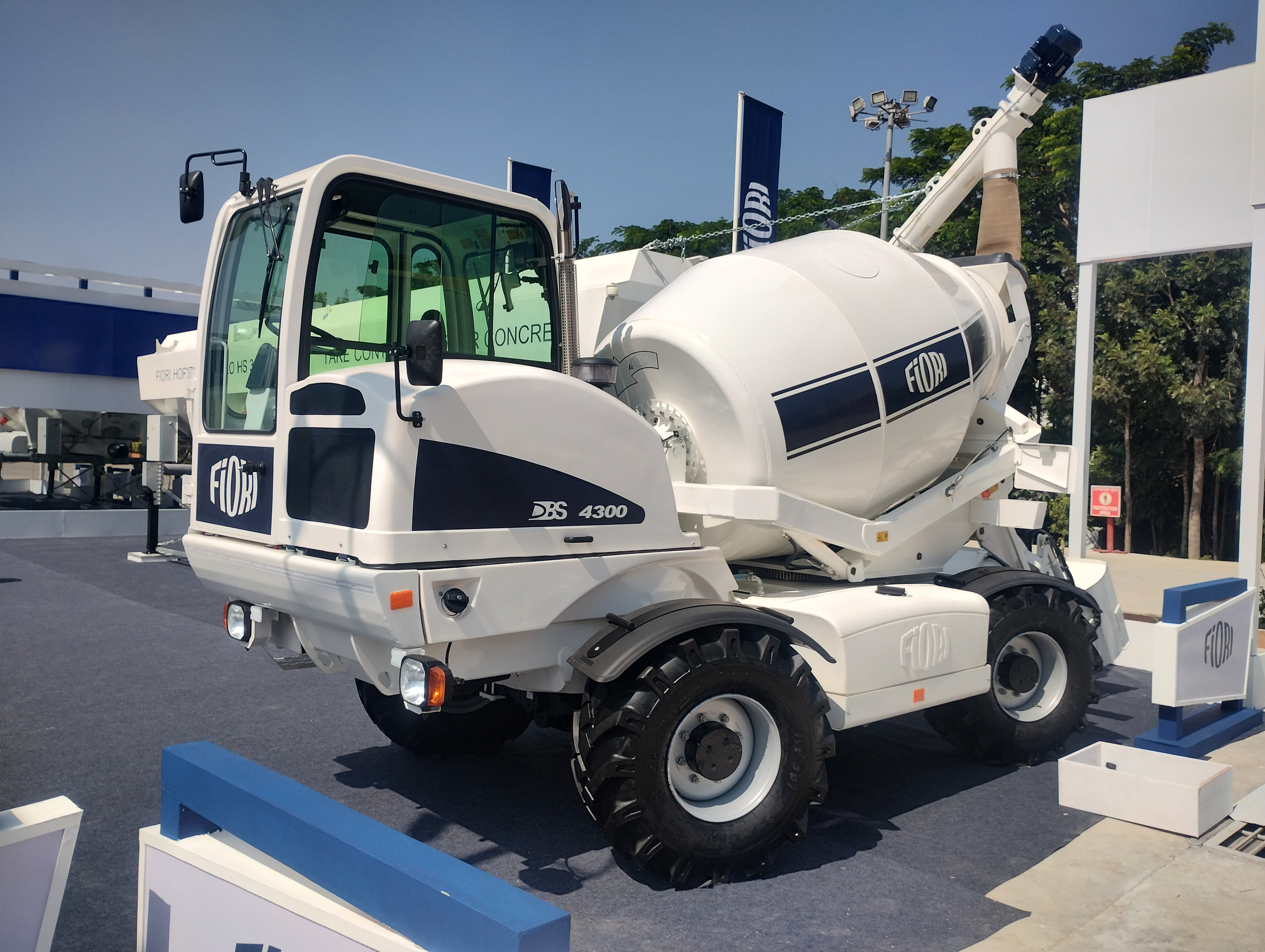

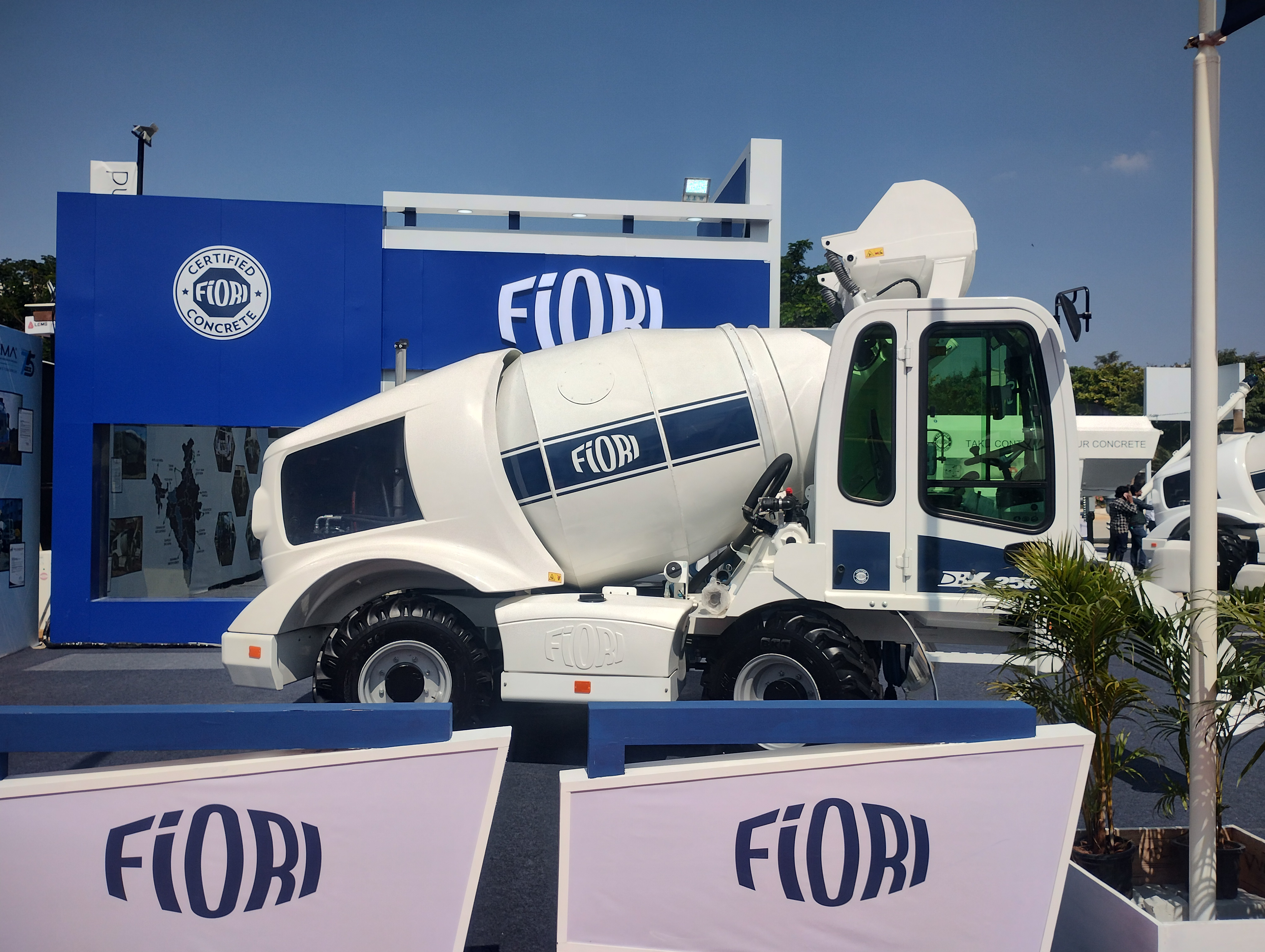

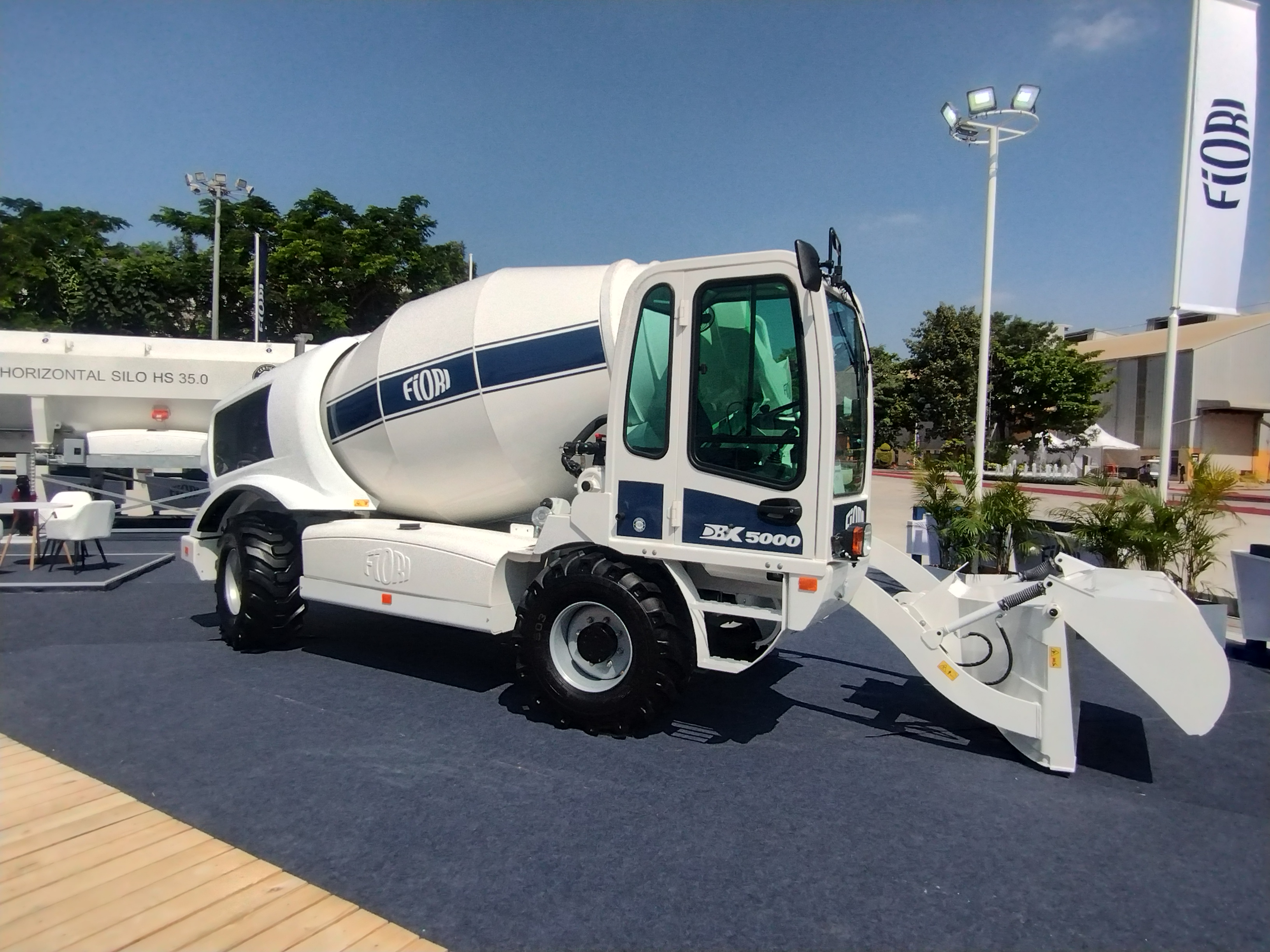

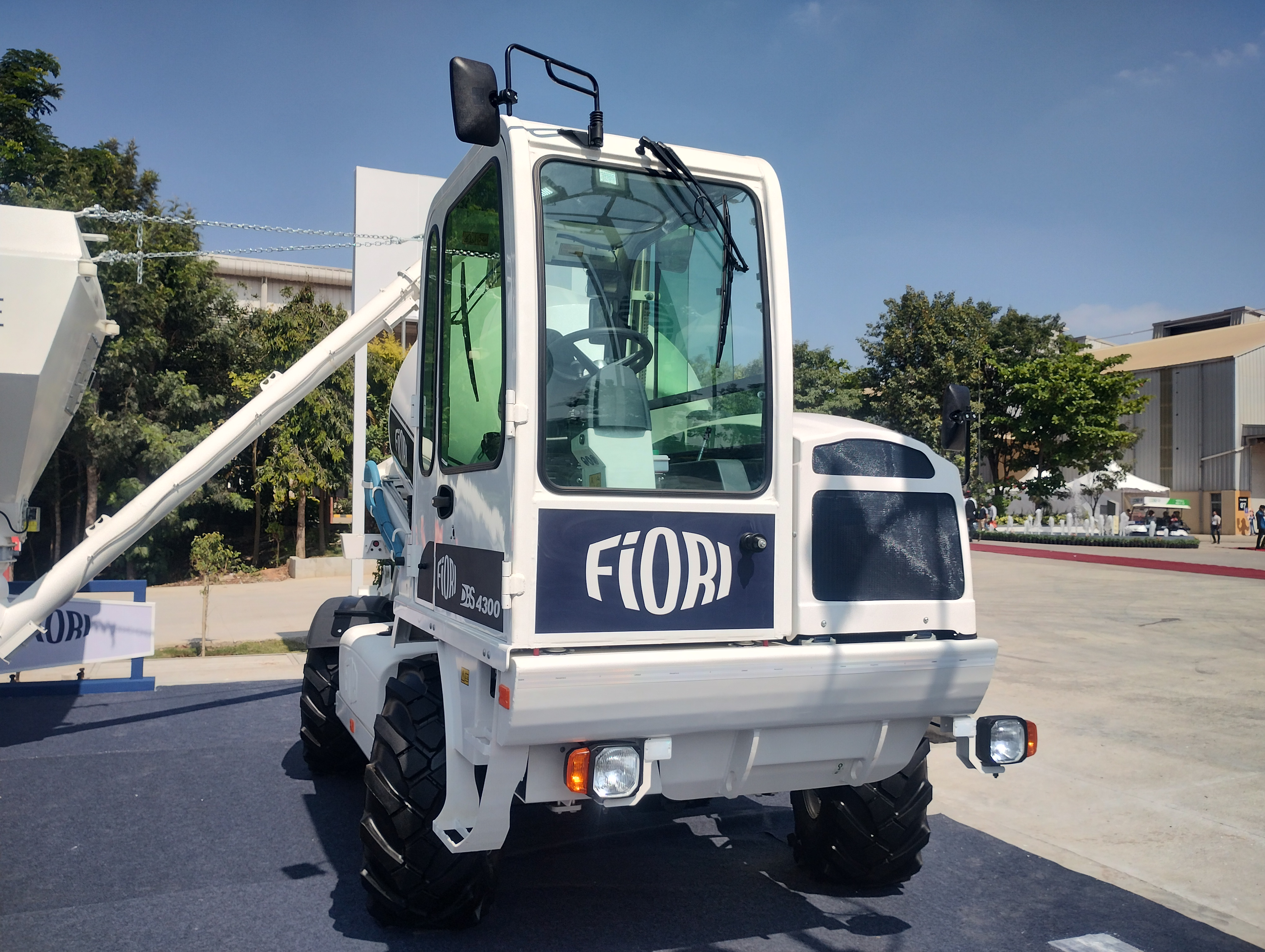
