= Ajax II =

Australian-bred Thoroughbred racehorse

Ajax
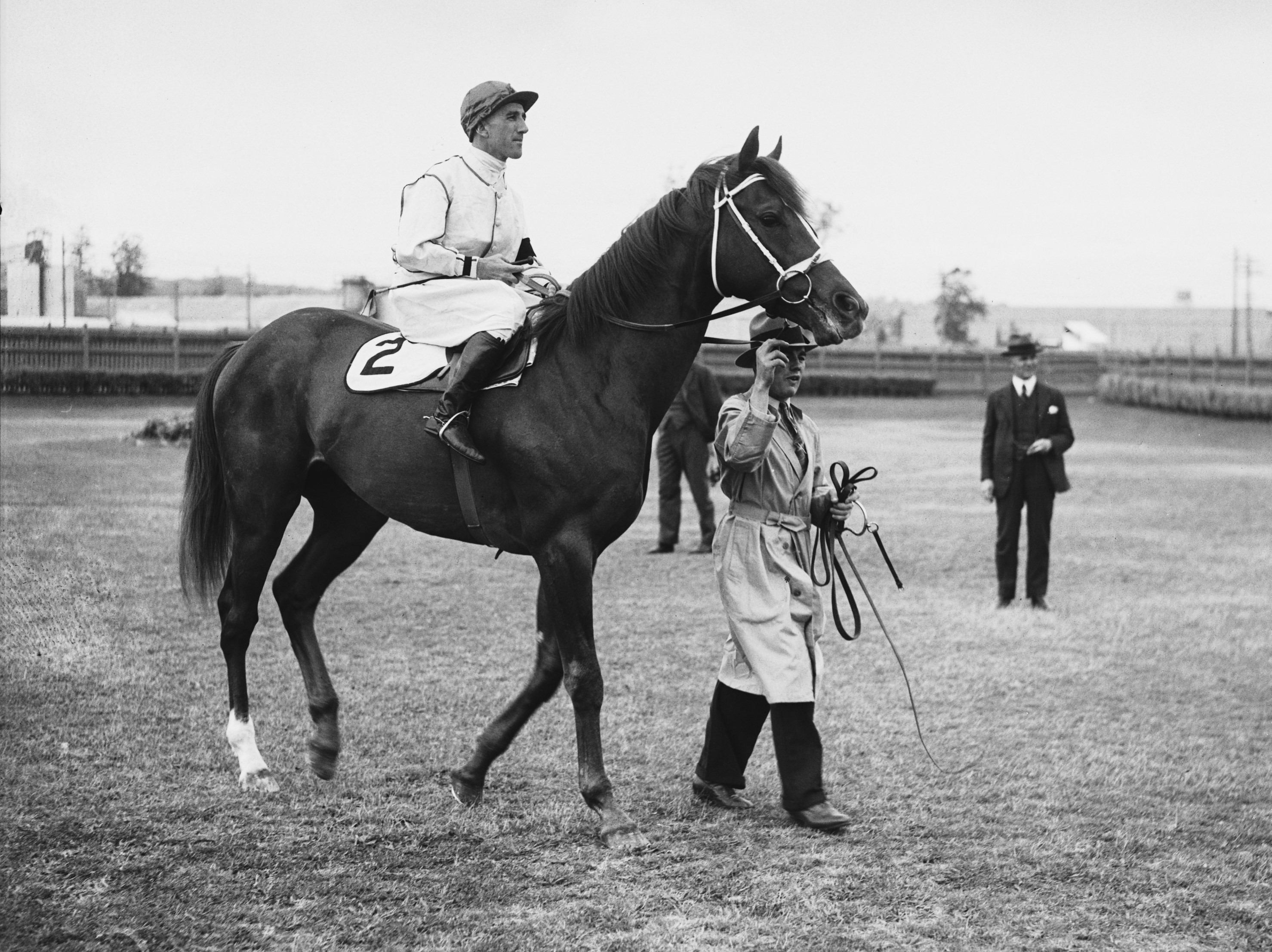
- Ajax and Maurice McCarten
- Sire: Heroic
- Grandsire: Valais (GB)
- Dam: Medmenham (IRE)
- Damsire: Prince Galahad (GB)
- Sex: Stallion
- Foaled: 1934
- Country: Australia
- Colour: Chestnut
- Breeder: Alfred W. Thompson, E.L. Balllieu
- Owner: 1. E.L. Baillieu, A.W. Thompson and "Mr Constable"; 2. Mr W.J. Smith; 3. Bing Crosby & Lin Howard
- Trainer: Frank Musgrave
- Record: 46: 36–7–2
- Earnings: £40,275

Major wins
- AJC Sires Produce Stakes (1937); Caulfield Guineas (1937); Champagne Stakes (1937); Rosehill Guineas (1937); Linlithgow Stakes (1937, 1938); All Aged Stakes (1938, 1939, 1940); Caulfield Stakes (1938); W. S. Cox Plate (1938); Futurity Stakes (1938, 1939, 1940); C.B.Fisher Plate (1938); Newmarket Handicap (1938); LKS MacKinnon Stakes (1938); Memsie Stakes (1938, 1939, 1940); Underwood Stakes (1938, 1939, 1940); VRC Queen Elizabeth Stakes (1938); St George Stakes (1939); Melbourne Stakes (1938 ,1940)

Honours
- Australian Racing Hall of Fame (2004); STC Ajax Stakes
- Last updated on 16 August 2010

Ajax was a champion Australian bred Thoroughbred racehorse and sire, who won 18 consecutive races before he was defeated at the odds of 40/1 on, causing a huge racing sensation. He had wins from 5 furlongs (1,000 m) to 1 1/2 miles (2,400 m), which equalled the Australasian record for one mile (1,600 m), and created three new race records. At stud in Australia, Ajax proved to be a good sire. He was then sold as a 14-year-old horse and exported to the United States before he was later sold to Bing Crosby and Lin Howard. Ajax was inducted into the Australian Racing Hall of Fame in 2004.

== Breeding ==
Ajax was a chestnut colt bred by Alfred Thompson and E.L. Balllieu that was foaled in 1934 at the Widden Stud in the Denman, New South Wales area. He was by the racehorse and sire Heroic, and his dam, Medmenham (IRE), was by Prince Galahad (GB), who won the Dewhurst Stakes. Medmenham was a race winner in Australia after her importation and was the dam of two other winners in Humorist and Hesione (won AJC Gimcrack Stakes, Maribyrnong Plate and VRC Ascot Vale (2yo) Stakes). Ajax was inbred to Cyllene (4m x 4m x 4f) and also to Martagon (4m x 4f) in the fourth generation of his pedigree.

=== 1938 racebook ===
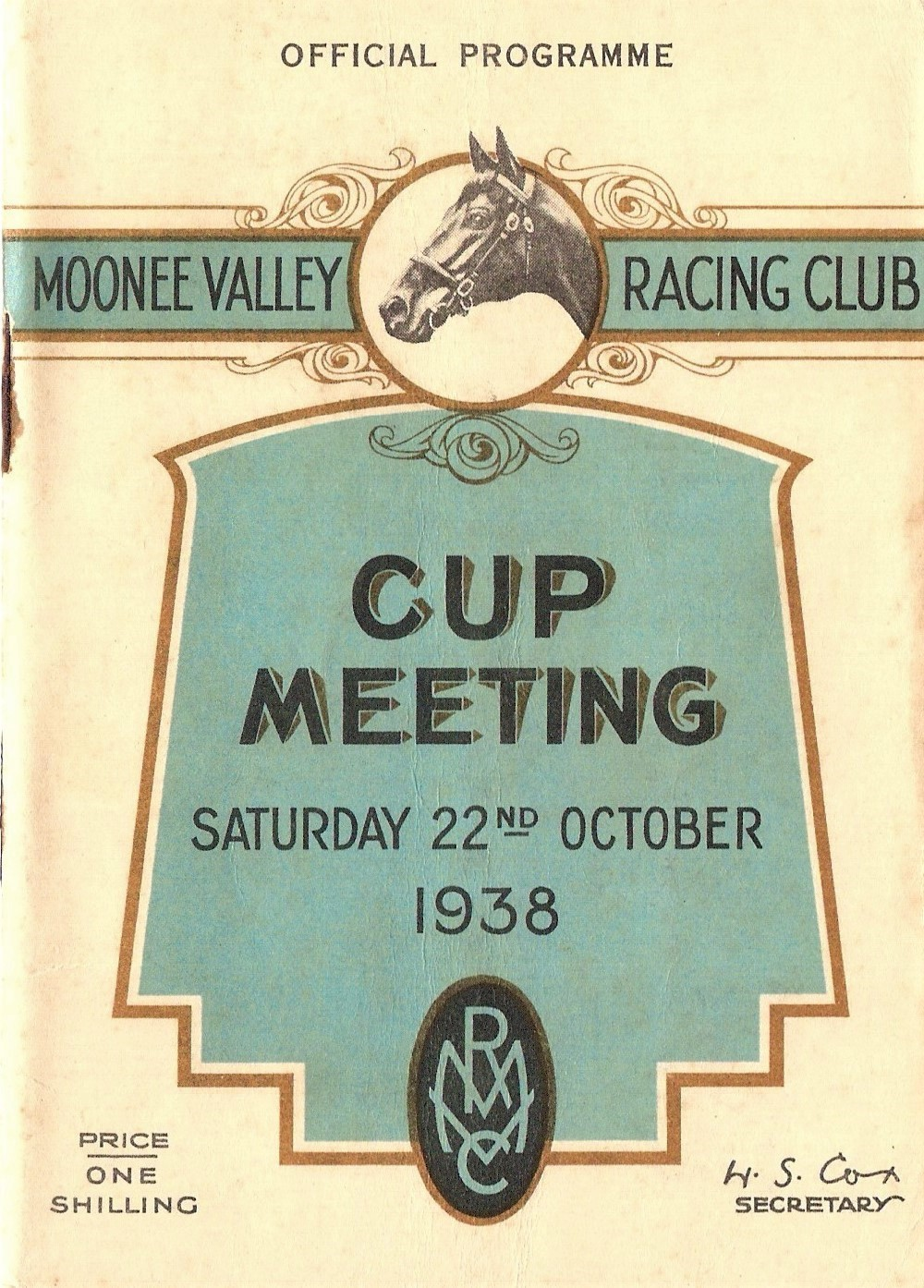
1938 W S Cox Plate racebook front cover

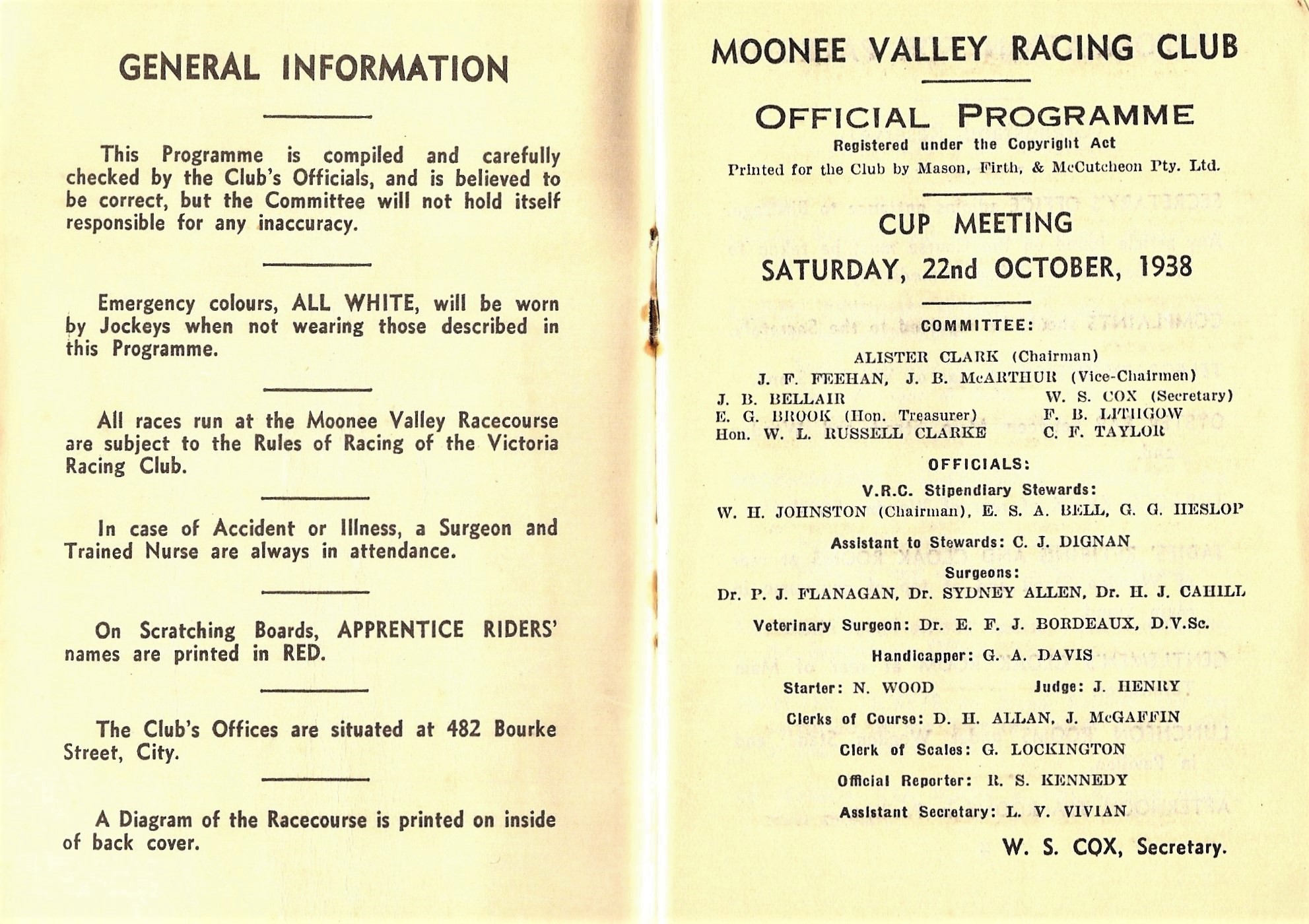
1938 W S Cox Plate showing raceday officials

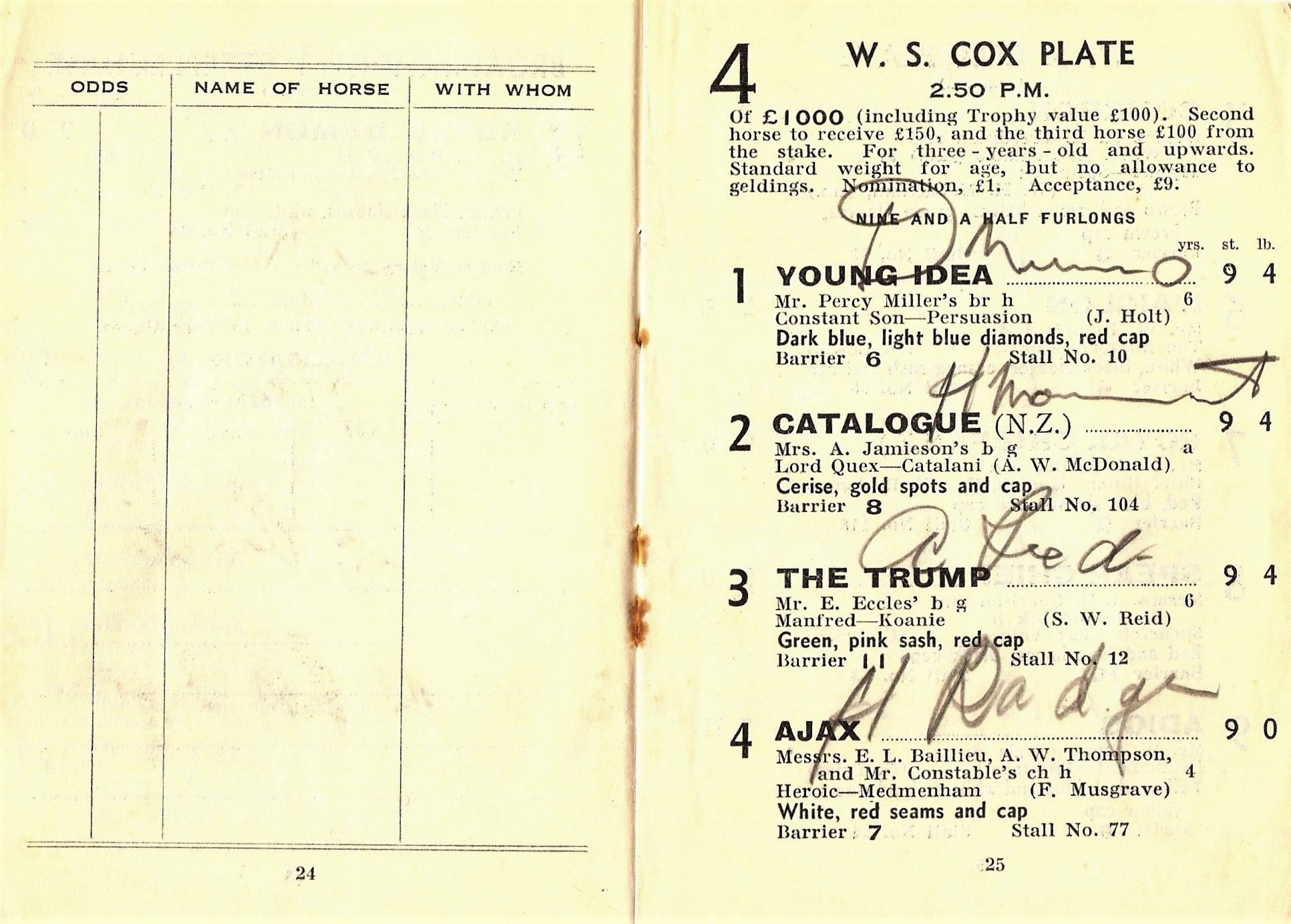
1938 W S Cox Plate showing the winner, Ajax

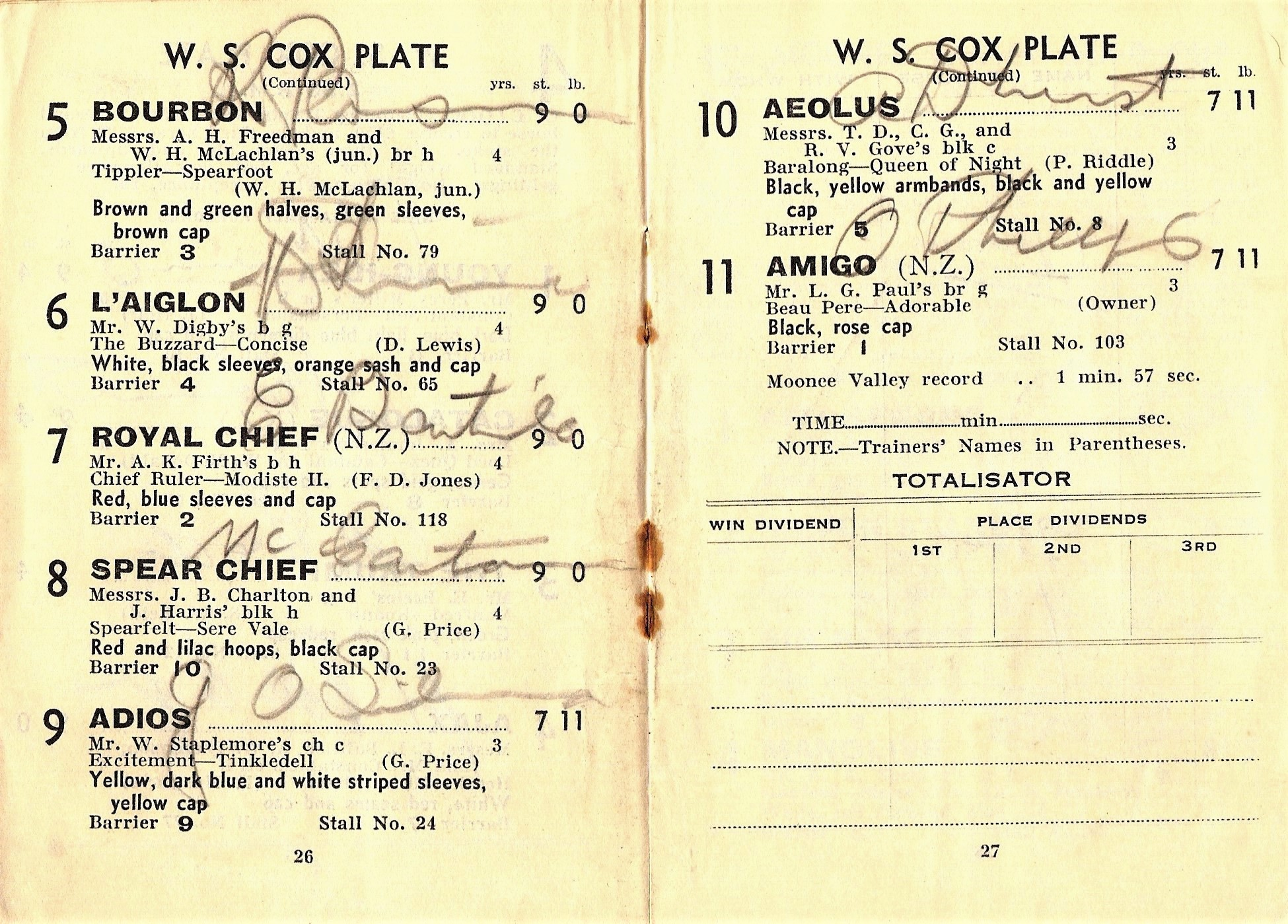
1938 W S Cox Plate starters and results

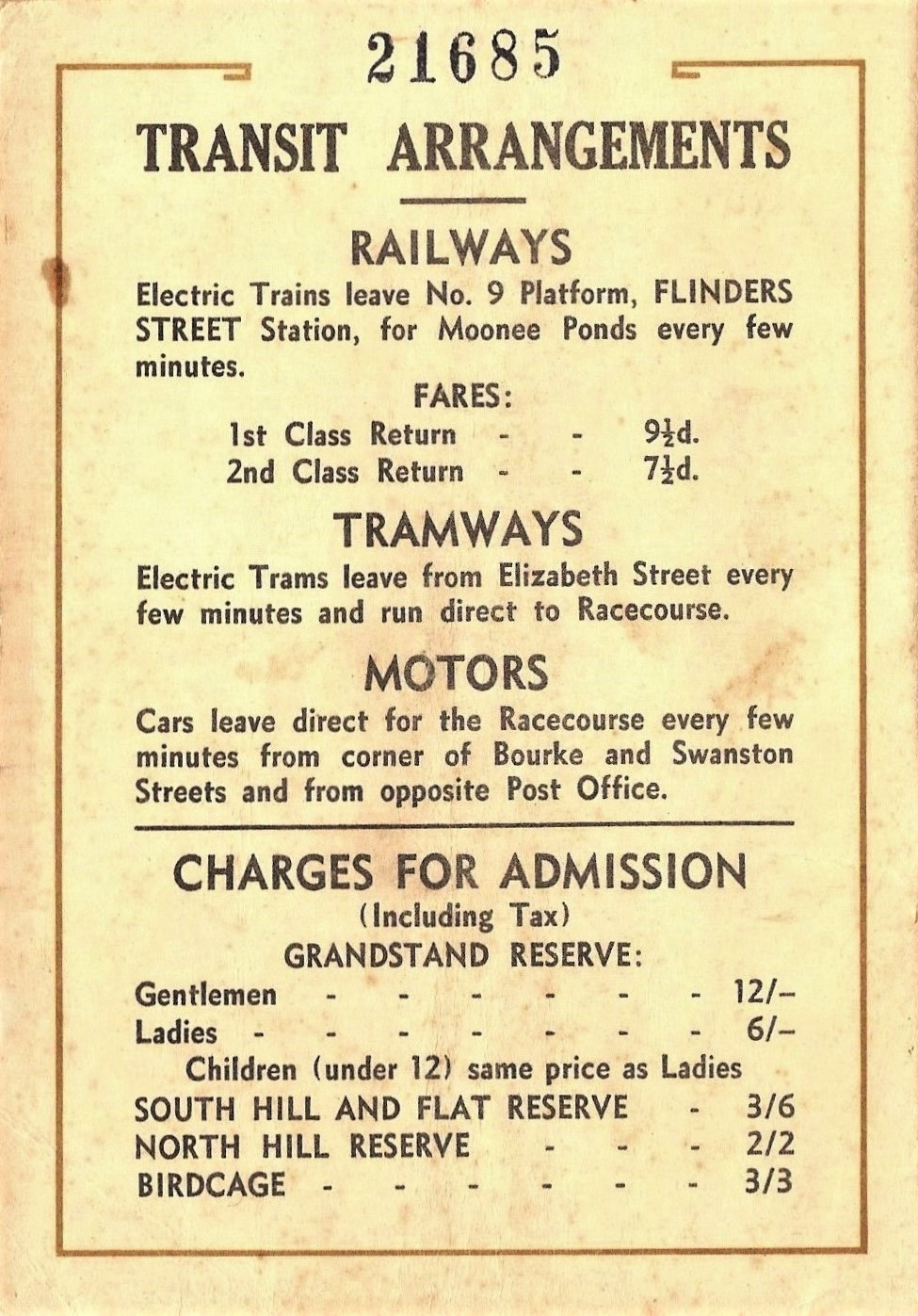
Back cover showing railway & entrance charges

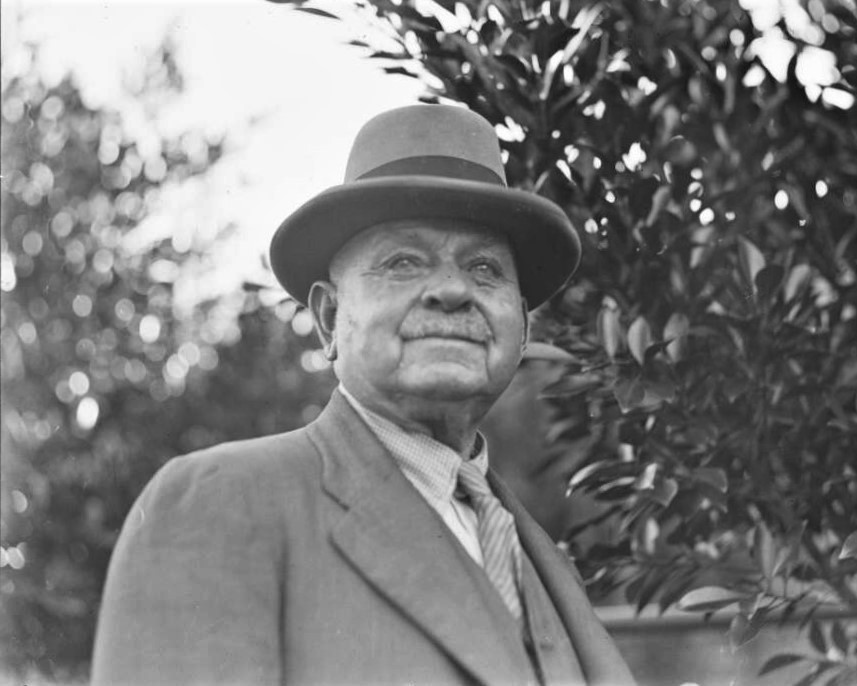
Frank Musgrave, trainer

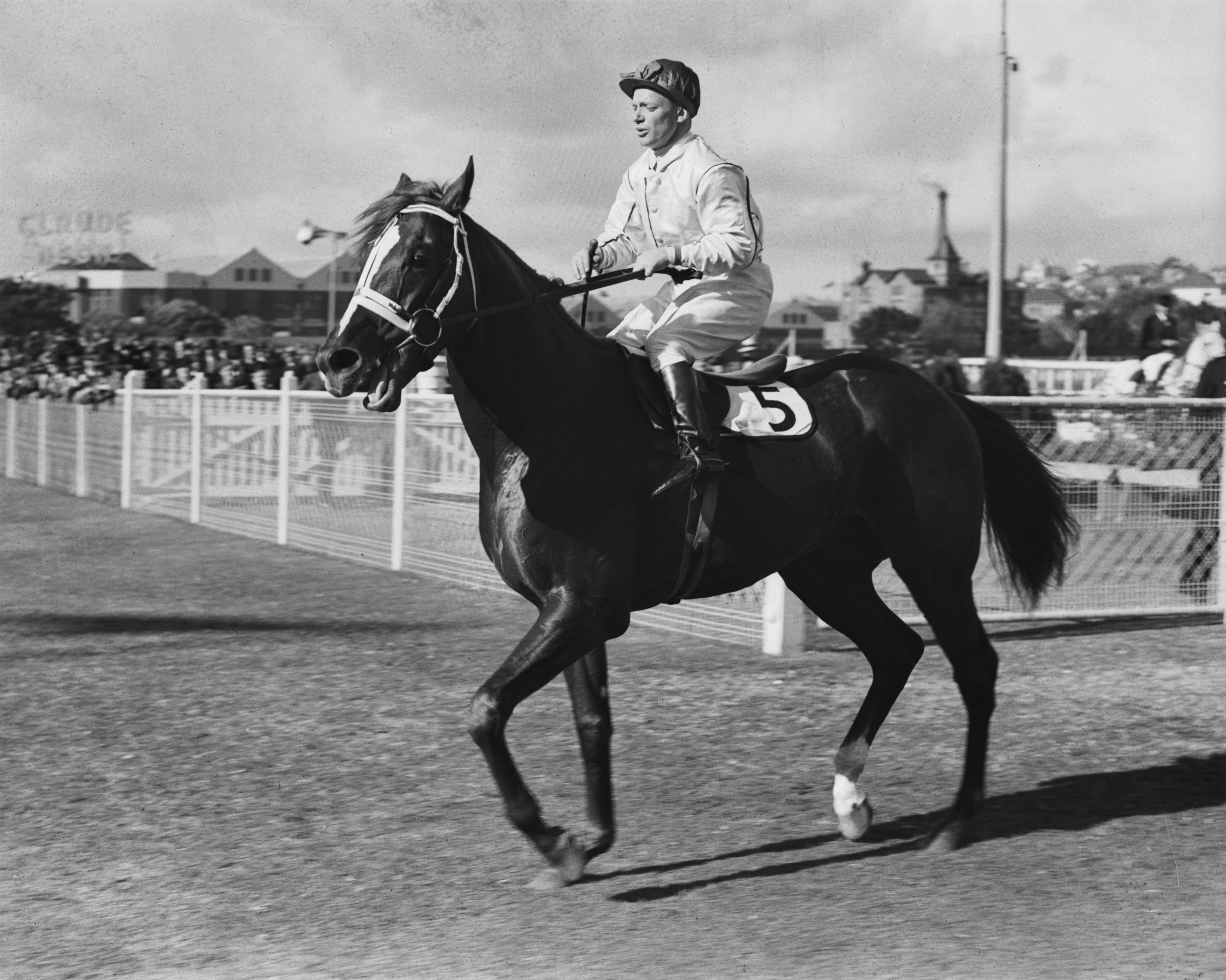
Ajax & Harold Badger Randwick 1938

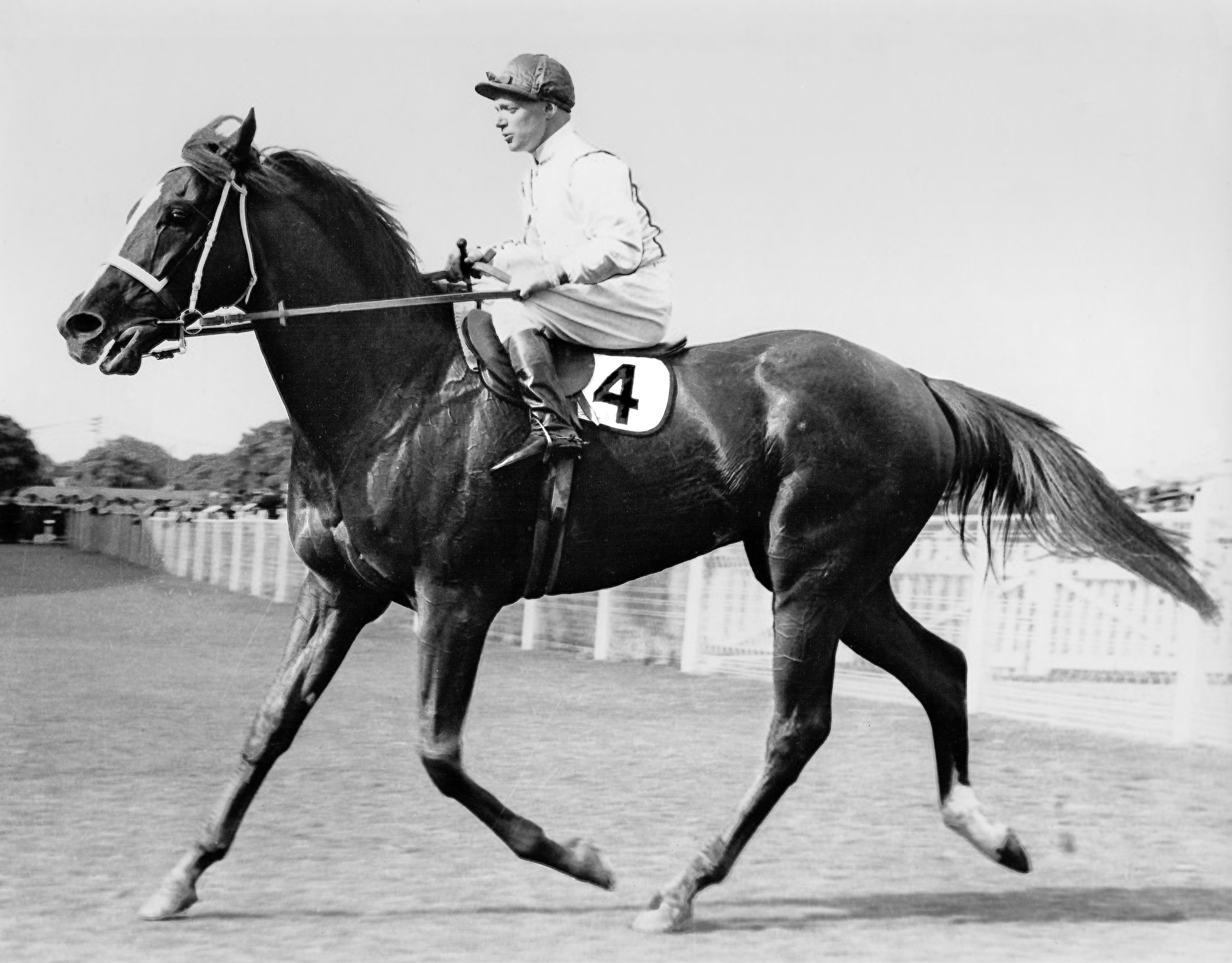
Ajax & Harold Badger, Randwick 1939

== Racing record ==
Ajax was ridden by Victoria's leading jockey and Australian Racing Hall of Fame inductee, the diminutive Harold Badger, in 37 races for 30 wins, five seconds, and two-thirds.

=== At two years: 1936–1937 ===
In his first two starts, Ajax won the Holiday Stakes (5½ furlongs) and the Federal Stakes. He was then unplaced for the only time in his career, in the VRC Sires Produce Stakes. Ajax next finished second to Caesar in the Ascot Vale Stakes before he returned to New South Wales for wins in the AJC Sires Produce Stakes (defeating Caesar by five lengths and setting a new race record) and the AJC Champagne Stakes from Hua by two lengths.

=== At three years: 1937–1938 ===
Ajax commenced his three-year-old season by winning the VATC Chatsworth Plate and then the Rosehill Guineas in a new race record time. In the AJC Derby he was defeated, by a length, by Avenger, to whom he had conceded two stone (12.7 kg). Taken to Melbourne, he won the Caulfield Guineas in another race record time, from Avenger and Hua, only to lose the Victoria Derby by half a head from Hua.

The above placings were followed by Ajax's eighteen consecutive victories:

- 4 November 1937 - weight for age (wfa) VRC Linlithgow Stakes over 8 furlongs (1 mile or 1,600m)
- 19 February 1938 - VATC Futurity Stakes, carried 9 st 6 lb (60 kg) and set a new race record
- 26 February 1938 - VRC Newmarket Handicap with a 3yo weight carrying record 9 stone (8lbs above wfa)
- 5 March 1938 - wfa VRC C.M. Lloyd Stakes over 8 furlongs
- 20 April 1938 - AJC All Aged Stakes over 8 furlongs
- 23 April 1938 wfa AJC C.W. Cropper Plate 6 furlongs (1,200 metres)

Ajax finished his a three-year-old season with 11 starts for 9 wins and 2 seconds.

=== At four years: 1938–1939 ===
Ajax's long winning streak continued with these wins:

- 27 August 1938 wfa Williamstown Underwood Stakes over 8 furlongs
- 3 September 1938 wfa VATC Memsie Stakes 9 furlongs
- 1 October 1938 wfa VRC Melbourne Stakes over 8 furlongs
- 12 October 1938 wfa Caulfield Stakes over 8 furlongs
- 22 October 1938 wfa MVRC W. S. Cox Plate 10 furlongs (2,000 m)
- 29 October 1938 wfa VRC LKS MacKinnon Stakes 10 furlongs
- 3 November 1938 wfa VRC Linlithgow Stakes over 8 furlongs
- 5 November 1938 wfa VRC CB Fisher Plate 12 furlongs (2,400 m)
- 18 February 1939 wfa VATC St George Stakes 9 furlongs
- 25 February 1939 VATC Futurity Stakes, for the second time, with 10 stone 6 pounds (66 kg)
- 9 March 1939 VRC King's Plate in which he started at the odds of 16/1 on
- 11 March 1939 VRC C.M. Lloyd Stakes in which he started at the odds of 20/1 on

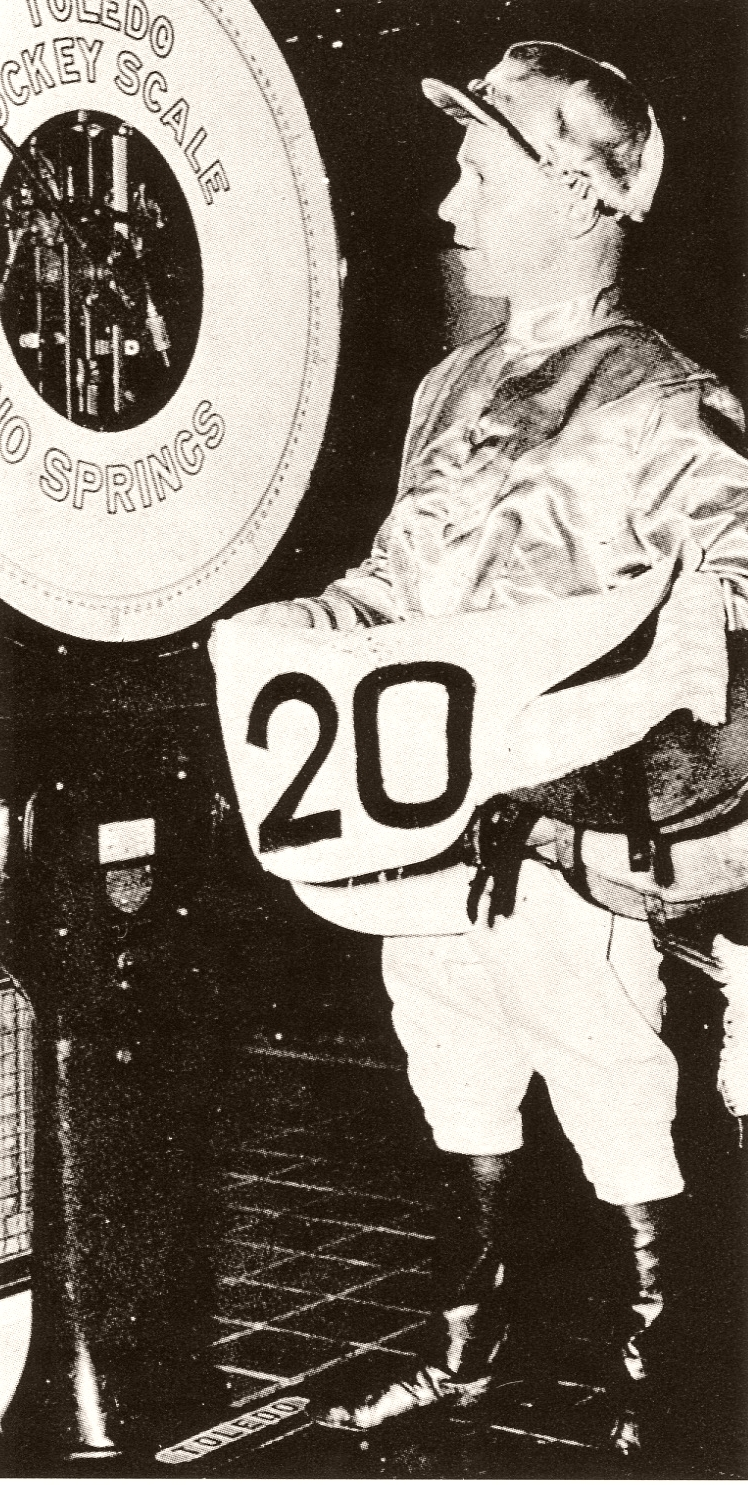
Ajax's regular jockey, Harold Badger

He was best remembered for winning these 18 consecutive races and for being defeated at his next start in the 1939 Rawson Stakes at 40/1 on, in a three-horse race where he went down to Spear Chief by half a length.

A fortnight later, Ajax returned to the winning list in the AJC All Aged Plate and three days later won the CW Cropper Plate for the second time. He finished his four-year-old season with 15 starts for 14 wins and 1 second.

=== At five years: 1939–1940 ===
Ajax won his first two five-year-old race starts: the Williamstown Underwood Stakes and Memsie Stakes. In the autumn, he ran third to High Caste and Manrico in the C F Orr Stakes and was defeated by a head by High Caste in the VATC George Stakes. He carried 10 stone 5 pounds in the VATC Futurity Stakes to win the race for the third time, defeating High Caste, to whom he conceded 13 pounds. Ajax was a 12 to 1 on when he won the VRC King's Plate. He finished third carrying 9.1 (57.5 kg) from Amiable with 8.12 (56.3 kg) and High Caste with 8.6 (53.5 kg) in the CM Lloyd Stakes. Two further victories in the A.J.C. All-Aged Plate and C. W. Cropper Plate provided the finale to his five-year-old season.

=== At six years: 1940 ===
As a six-year-old, Ajax again won the Memsie Stakes, Melbourne Stakes and the Underwood Stakes, again for the third time. He was second by half a neck to favourite Beau Vite in the 1940 W. S. Cox Plate and also finished second to High Caste in the Caulfield Stakes.

=== Racing summary ===
Ajax won the All Aged Stakes, Memsie Stakes, Futurity Stakes, and Underwood Stakes three times each and the 1938 Cox Plate. His record was 46 starts for 36 wins, 7 seconds, and 2 thirds for prize money of £40,250. Ajax is the shortest-priced favourite ever defeated in Australia. In the 1939 Rawson Stakes, he started as 40 to 1 on favourite and was defeated by Spear Chief by half a length.

== Stud record ==
He was retired to stud during 1941 to the Widden Valley region of the upper Hunter Region. Ajax was a prolific sire that produced nine individual stakes winners including these good horses:

- Achilles (won AJC Epsom Handicap)
- Betrothal, dam of Magic Night (won Golden Slipper Stakes)
- Chaperone (VATC Merson Cooper Stakes, VRC Ascot Vale Stakes)
- Civic Pride (won AJC Gimcrack Stakes)
- Havoc (1945 AJC Breeders' Plate)
- Lady Ajax (VATC Debutante Stakes)
- Magnificent (AJC Sires' Produce S, Champagne Stakes, AJC Australian Derby and VRC Derby).
- Magnificent Lady, dam of Birthday Card (Golden Slipper Stakes and Sandown Guineas)
- Mighty Song (VRC Maribyrnong Plate, AJC Gimcrack Stakes)
- Mine Host (Tatt's NSW Carrington Stakes)
- Pantomime (AJC December Stakes etc.)
- Tivoli Star, dam of Tipperary Star (Doomben 10,000 etc.)
- Whistling Wind, dam of The Tempest (AJC Challenge Stakes, Doomben 10,000)

Ajax's Australian progeny earned £133,739.

In 1948, he was sold as a 14-year-old horse to the United States of America for 13,000 guineas to Mr W.J. Smith, who later resold him to Messrs. Bing Crosby and Lin Howard. Ajax did not meet with the same stud success in America that he had in Australia, but he did sire Avracado $71,813, Trebor Yug $19,420, and A. Jaxson $11,444.

All this justified Ajax's inclusion in the Australian Racing Hall of Fame in 2004.

The Group 2 Sydney Turf Club Ajax Stakes contested at Rosehill Racecourse in Sydney are named in his honour.

== Pedigree ==
Pedigree of Ajax (AUS) (2) Chestnut stallion, 1934
Sire Heroic (Aus) Ch. 1921	Valais (GB); 1905	Cicero (GB)	Cyllene (GB)
Sire Heroic (Aus) Ch. 1921	Valais (GB); 1905	Cicero (GB)	Gas (GB)
Sire Heroic (Aus) Ch. 1921	Valais (GB); 1905	Lily of the Valley (GB)	Martagon (GB)
Sire Heroic (Aus) Ch. 1921	Valais (GB); 1905	Lily of the Valley (GB)	Hamptonia (GB)
Sire Heroic (Aus) Ch. 1921	Chersonese (GB); 1915	Cylgad (GB)	Cyllene (GB)
Sire Heroic (Aus) Ch. 1921	Chersonese (GB); 1915	Cylgad (GB)	Gadfly (GB)
Sire Heroic (Aus) Ch. 1921	Chersonese (GB); 1915	Chelandry (GB)	Goldfinch (GB)
Sire Heroic (Aus) Ch. 1921	Chersonese (GB); 1915	Chelandry (GB)	Illuminata (GB)
Dam Medmenham (IRE) 1924	Prince Galahad (GB); 1917	Prince Palatine (GB)	Persimmon (GB)
Dam Medmenham (IRE) 1924	Prince Galahad (GB); 1917	Prince Palatine (GB)	Lady Lightfoot (GB)
Dam Medmenham (IRE) 1924	Prince Galahad (GB); 1917	Decagone (GB)	Martagon (GB)
Dam Medmenham (IRE) 1924	Prince Galahad (GB); 1917	Decagone (GB)	Desca (GB)
Dam Medmenham (IRE) 1924	Meadow Grass (Ire); 1914	Lemberg (GB)	Cyllene (GB)
Dam Medmenham (IRE) 1924	Meadow Grass (Ire); 1914	Lemberg (GB)	Galicia (GB)
Dam Medmenham (IRE) 1924	Meadow Grass (Ire); 1914	Bunch Grass (GB)	Sainfoin (GB)
Dam Medmenham (IRE) 1924	Meadow Grass (Ire); 1914	Bunch Grass (GB)	Charm (GB) (Family: 2)

== See also ==
- List of leading Thoroughbred racehorses
- List of racehorses
- Repeat winners of horse races
