= Ajax (1906 automobile) =

The Ajax was a Swiss automobile built from 1906 to 1910.

Dr. G. Aigner built his first car in Zürich in 1906, but failed. The remains were taken over by a company led by three directors from New York City, Java and Switzerland. A chain-drive monobloc 20/27cv four was introduced early on; the company failed soon after, but regrouped and reformed in 1907. That year the company introduced four new models. These were a 2270 cc 16cv four and a 3267 cc 24cv four, as well as bi-bloc sixes of 3405 cc and 4900 cc. The cars had a mechanical starter, which would begin operating the moment anybody stood on the running board.

In 1907, two Ajax cars competed at the Targa Florio race. One car was crashed, the other failed. The company made an unsuccessful venture into the Droschke (taxi) business which forced its closure once again in February 1910, this time for good.
