= HMS Ajax =

Eight ships of the Royal Navy have been named HMS Ajax after the Greek hero Ajax:

- HMS Ajax (1767) was a 74-gun third-rate ship of the line launched in 1767 and sold in 1785.
- HMS Ajax (1798) was a 74-gun third rate launched in 1798. She fought at the Battle of Trafalgar in 1805 and was burned by accident in 1807.
- HMS Ajax (1809) was a 74-gun third rate launched in 1809. She was converted to screw propulsion in 1846 and broken up in 1864.
- HMS Ajax was a 78-gun third rate launched in 1835 as HMS Vanguard. She was renamed HMS Ajax in 1867 and was broken up in 1875.
- HMS Ajax (1880) was an Ajax-class ironclad battleship launched in 1880 and sold in 1904.
- HMS Ajax (1912) was a King George V-class battleship launched in 1912 and broken up in 1926.
- HMS Ajax (22) was a Leander-class light cruiser launched in 1934. She took part in the Battle of the River Plate and was broken up in 1949.
- HMS Ajax (F114) was a Leander-class frigate launched in 1962 and broken up in 1988.
- HMS Ajax (851F) was an Admiralty barge built in 1956. She was moored at Jupiter Point on the Lynher River, Plymouth for seamanship training by HMS Raleigh from 1987 to 2008.

== Battle Honours ==
- St. Vincent 1780
- St Kitts 1782
- The Saints 1782
- Egypt 1801
- Trafalgar 1805
- San Sebastian 1813
- Baltic 1854–55
- Jutland 1916
- River Plate 1939
- Mediterranean 1940–41
- Matapan 1941
- Greece 1941
- Crete 1941
- Malta Convoys 1941
- Aegean 1944
- Normandy 1944
- South France 1944

== See also ==
- Ajax (ship)
