= Harold Badger =

Australian jockey (1907–1981)

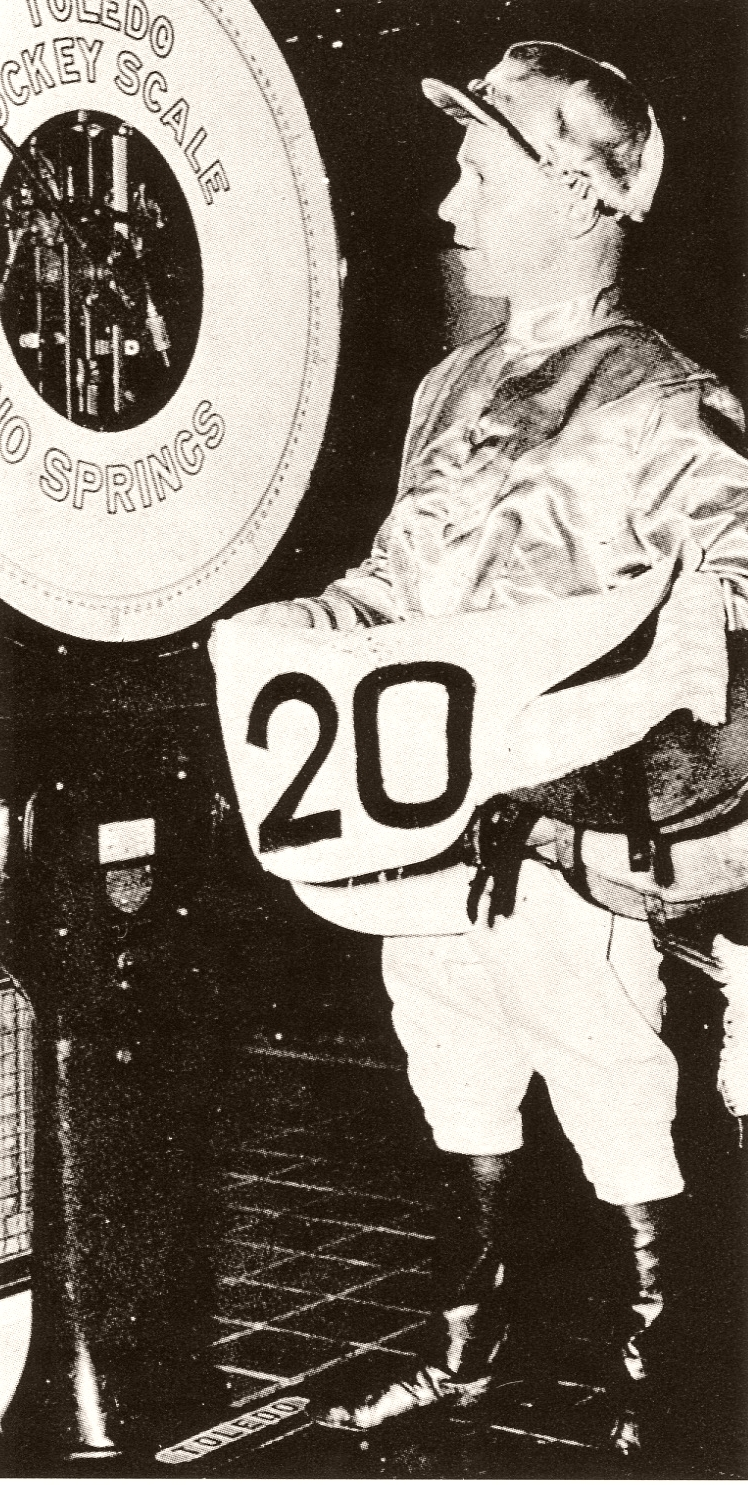
Harold Badger

Harold Lindsay Badger (10 October 1907 – 13 December 1981) was an Australian jockey, famous for riding the champion racehorse Ajax in many of his wins.

Badger was born at Northcote, Melbourne, the third of eight children. Two of his brothers, Clarence and Eric, also became jockeys. Apprenticed at 14 to Richard Bradfield, he often raced in South Australia, winning the Adelaide Cup in 1925. Granted his senior jockey's licence in 1927, he moved to Adelaide and was immediately successful, winning the South Australian jockey's premiership in his first season.

He returned to Victoria, but had few opportunities in major races as the number-two jockey for trainer Lou Robertson, so he turned freelance in 1936. That year he won the Caulfield Cup on Northwind. With Ajax's regular jockey, Maurice McCarten unavailable, Badger was given the ride in the 1937 Victoria Derby, finishing a close second. This was the start of his association with Ajax, and he went on to win 30 of 37 races on him, finishing second five times and third twice. Possibly the most famous of these races was the 1939 Rawson Stakes, where Ajax finished second, despite starting favourite at 40/1 on.

His success with Ajax put him in great demand with Victorian owners and trainers, and he won his first Victorian jockey's premiership in the 1938-39 season. He went on to win the premiership a further five times. His major race wins included the Caulfield Cup, the Moonee Valley Cup, the Adelaide Cup, the Brisbane Cup, the Doncaster Handicap, the Epsom Handicap, the W S Cox Plate, the Newmarket Handicap (all twice) and the Futurity Stakes (three times).
