= Ajax Mine =

Ajax Mine or Ajax mine may refer to:

- Ajax Copper Mine, a former copper mine, now a fossil site, in South Australia
- Ajax Mine, Oregon, see List of mines in Oregon
- Ajax Mine Project, a proposed development in British Columbia, Canada (rejected in 2018)
- Kanichee Mine, Temagami, Ontario, also known as Ajax Mine
