= USS Ajax =

Four ships of the United States Navy have been named Ajax, after Ajax, a Greek hero during the Trojan War.

- USS Ajax (1869), launched in 1864 as USS Manayunk, renamed Ajax in 1869. Decommissioned 1898.
- USS Ajax (AG-15), named Scindia, a collier, purchased in 1898 and later converted to a seaplane tender. Decommissioned in 1925.
- USS Ajax (SP-738), a research vessel acquired in 1917, renamed USS Rockport in 1918. Sold 1919.
- USS Ajax (AR-6), a Vulcan-class repair ship, launched in 1941 and decommissioned in 1989.

== See also ==
- Ajax (ship)
