= Ajax (1914 automobile) =

American car manufacturer

Ajax Motors Co.
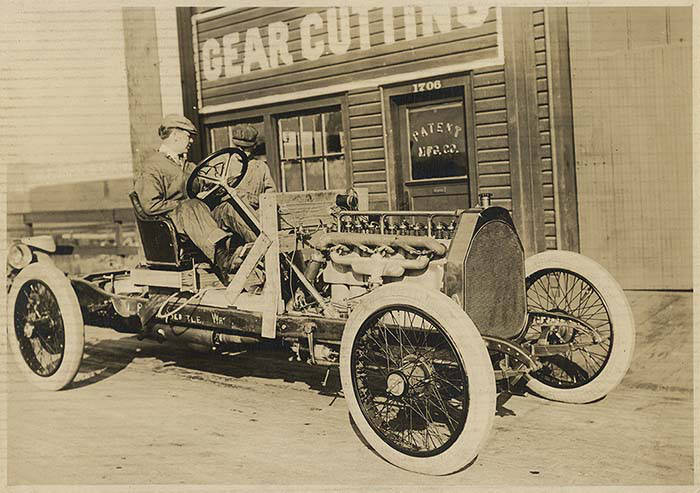
- 1914 Ajax Motors Car
- Industry: Automotive
- Headquarters: Seattle, Washington, United States
- Key people: George Parker, Frank Parker, Charles Parker
- Products: Automobiles

Ajax Motors Co. was an automobile company based in Seattle, Washington, started by George, Frank, and Charles Parker.

The company produced a two-seat car. It was available in three wheelbase lengths. Right-hand and left-hand steering were offered. It had a 6-cylinder engine that was available in either sleeve valve or poppet valve form, and could be changed "from one to the other at comparatively little expense."

== See also ==
- Brass Era car
