= Ajax (locomotive) =

Locomotives named Ajax have included:

- L&MR 29 Ajax (1832), an 0-2-2
- L&SR Ajax (1838), an 0-4-2
- GWR Ajax (1838), a broad gauge Premier class 0-6-0; withdrawn 1871.
- KFNB Ajax (Jones, Turner and Evans, 1841), one of a pair of 0-4-2 locomotive built for the Emperor Ferdinand Northern Railway, believed to be the oldest preserved steam locomotive on the European mainland; displayed in the Technisches Museum Wien
- L&SWR 41 Ajax (Jones, Turner & Evans, 1841) a Hercules I class 0-4-2 goods locomotive
- MS&LR 24 Ajax (1846), a 2-2-2 locomotive
- ELR 17 (1847), a Pegasus class
- SSR 21 (1855)
- L&SWR 41 Ajax (Nine Elms, 1855) a Hercules II class 2-4-0, withdrawn 1883
- LC&DR Ajax (1860) a Dido class 0-6-0, later numbered 144
- SDR Ajax, (Slaughter, Grüning & Co. 395 of 1860) one of the eight South Devon Railway Dido class broad gauge 0-6-0ST locomotives, later GWR 2149; withdrawn 1884.
- Logan and Hemingway (civil engineering contractors) 5 Ajax (1864), later sold to the Manchester, Sheffield and Lincolnshire Railway
- L&SWR 41 Ajax (Nine Elms 124 of 1874) a Vesuvius II class 2-4-0 passenger locomotive
- L&NWR 509 (Crewe Works 2799 of 1885), a Dreadnought class 2-2-2-0 passenger locomotive scrapped in 1904.
- Woolwich Arsenal Ajax, an 18-inch gauge 0-4-0T
- L&NWR 639 Ajax (Crewe Works 4445 of 1904), an LNWR Precursor class 4-4-0, later LMS 5190; withdrawn 1928
- Ajax (Andrew Barclay Sons & Co. 1605 of 1918), an 0-6-0T preserved at the Northampton & Lamport Railway
- LMSR 6139 Ajax (North British Locomotive Co. 23634 of 1927), an LMS Royal Scot Class 4-6-0 express locomotive, Renamed The Welch Regiment in 1936, rebuilt in 1946 and withdrawn 1962
- LMS 5689 Ajax (Crewe Works 287 [second series] of 1936), an LMS Jubilee Class express locomotive, withdrawn 1964
- Chatham Dockyard Trust Ajax (Robert Stephenson & Hawthorns 7042 of 1941), built for Chatham Dockyard. Preserved.
- BR D446, later 50046 (English Electric 3816 and Vulcan Foundry D1187 of 1968), one of the fifty class 50s, all of which were named after warships
