= Ajax, Virginia =

Unincorporated community in Virginia, US

Coordinates: 36°58′52″N 79°34′37″W

Ajax is an unincorporated community in Pittsylvania County, in the U.S. state of Virginia.
