= A-Jax (video game) =

1987 video game

- Arcade flyer
- Developer: Konami
- Publisher: Konami
- Director: Koji Hiroshita
- Composer: Motoaki Furukawa
- Platforms: Arcade, Amstrad CPC, Commodore 64, MS-DOS, ZX Spectrum, X68000
- Release: December 1987
- Genre: Scrolling shooter
- Modes: Single-player, multiplayer

A-Jax (Note: Japanese: エー・ジャックス, Hepburn: Ē Jakkusu) is a vertically scrolling shooter developed and published by Konami. It was released in 1987 in Japan as an arcade video game. Imagine Software ported the game to the ZX Spectrum, Amstrad CPC, and Commodore 64, publishing the game in Europe as Typhoon.

The players control a "Tom Tiger" helicopter (in the 2D stage) and later a "Jerry Mouse" fighter jet (in the 3D stage), and shoot enemies in the air and bomb them on the ground, collecting power-ups and defeating bosses to advance levels.

The game was later released by Hamster Corporation as part of their Arcade Archives series for the PlayStation 4 in 2015 and Nintendo Switch in 2021; this version was included in Konami's Arcade Classics Anniversary Collection.

== Gameplay ==
Left: Tom Tiger stage.
(Arcade version showcased)

Right: Jerry Mouse stage.
(Arcade version showcased)

The game takes place in a fictional 2007, where an unnamed nuclear superpower had been working with aliens to construct an artificial planetoid. However, the aliens betrayed and invaded the superpower, cutting off all communication with the rest of the world, then beginning a conquest of the planet. Determined to prevent the aliens from using the planetoid to deploy nuclear weapons with impunity, the United Nations deploy the elite strike force A-Jax to cripple the alien campaign and destroy the planetoid.

The player combats the occupation forces using vehicles under operation code named 'A-Jax' created to liberate the Earth. Game play is divided into two scrolling sections with two different vehicles: the first being a vertical scrolling section with the helicopter and a rail scrolling stage with the jet/space fighter. The game spans eight stages and extends to 30,000 points, a second at 150,000 points.

During the helicopter segments, the player has access to four different weapons air-to-air weapons (Vulcan, 3-Way, Triple, Laser) and air-to-ground bombs. Each air-to-air weapon is available through their own specific pick-up icon, while picking up a B upgrades the bombs' speed and power. However, the helicopter can only equip one air-to-air weapon at a time, with the Bomb being constant. The player also has access to Options which add additional firepower. The jet segments contrast highly from the helicopter segments--they have a complete lack of available power-ups and additional weapons beyond a machine gun and bomb.

== Reception ==
In Japan, Game Machine listed A-Jax on their January 15, 1988 issue as being the second most-successful table arcade unit of the year.
