= Ajax (motorcycle) =

- Production: 1923–1924
- Class: Motorcycle
- Engine: 147 cc, 247 cc, 269 cc, 346 cc Villiers and Blackburne

The Ajax was a motorcycle manufactured in England between 1923 and 1924, using 147 cc, 247 cc, 269 cc and 346 cc engines from Villiers Engineering and Blackburne.
