= Highbury, Centennial Park =

Highbury
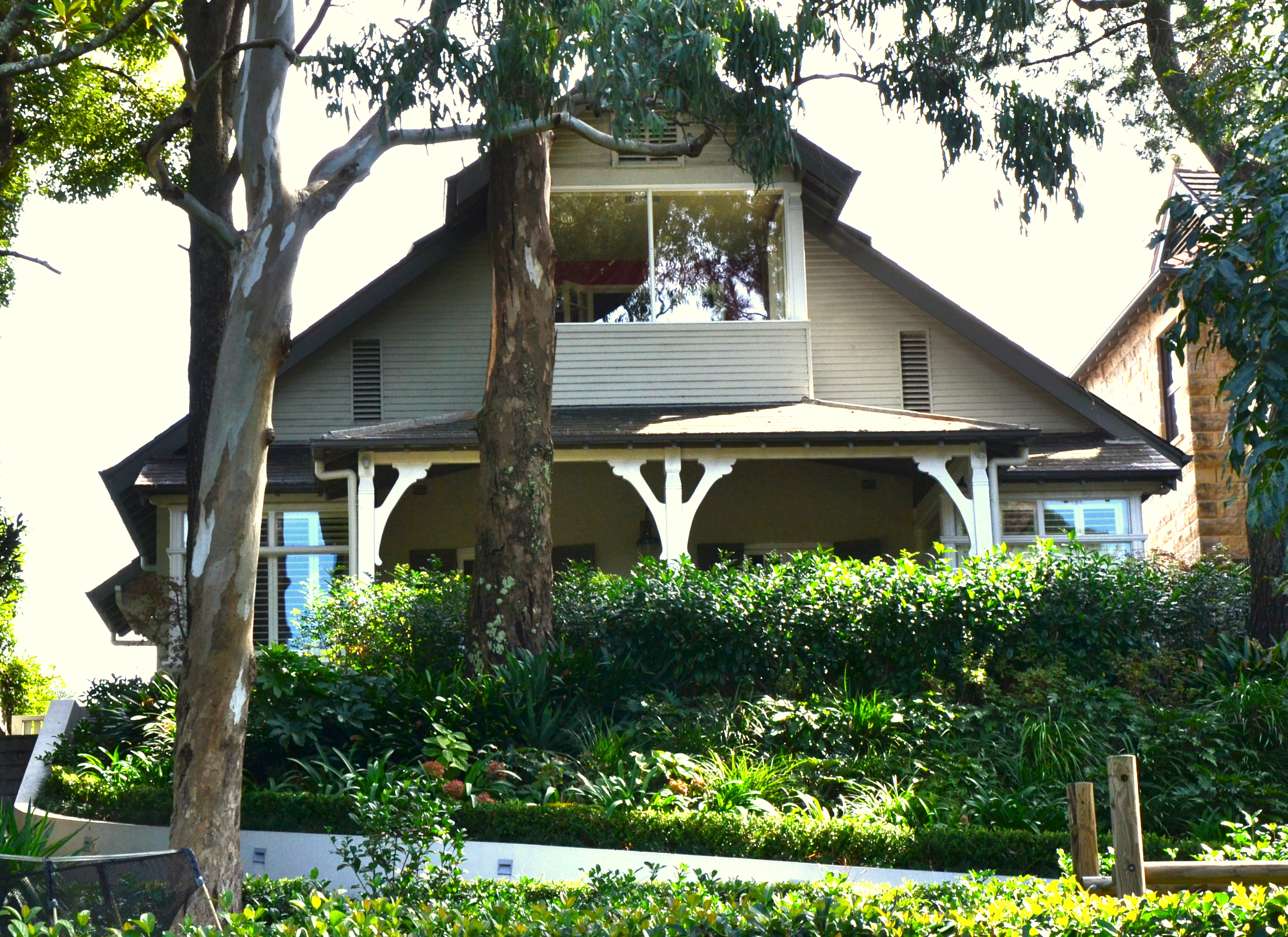
- View of the residence in 2012

- Location within inner Sydney
- 33.8992°S 151.2259°E
- Location: 20 Martin Road, Centennial Park, City of Sydney, New South Wales, Australia

History
- Built: 1912–1913

Site notes
- Architect: William Nixon
- Architectural style: Federation Bungalow

New South Wales Heritage Register
- Official name: Patrick White House, The; Highbury; Patrick White's House
- Type: State heritage (built)
- Designated: 19 November 2004
- Reference no.: 1719
- Type: House
- Category: Residential buildings (private)

Highbury, also known as the Patrick White House, or Patrick White's House, is a heritage-listed residence located at 20 Martin Road in the inner eastern Sydney suburb of Centennial Park, New South Wales, Australia. It was designed by William Nixon and built from 1912 to 1913. Highbury was the home of Australian novelist Patrick White for approximately twenty-six years, until his death in 1990. The property is privately owned. It was added to the New South Wales State Heritage Register on 19 November 2004.

Patrick White moved into Highbury in 1964 and lived there with his partner, Manoly Lascaris, after leaving his home in the suburb of Castle Hill. The house and the environs of Centennial Park became significant elements in White's novels. White and Lascaris were socially active and hosted many dinner parties in the house. White's biographer, David Marr, described White as a genial host. Following White's death in 1990, the house was listed on the New South Wales State Heritage Register due to its association with White, who was the first Australian to win the Nobel Prize for Literature. Lascaris continued to live in the house almost until he died in 2003.

== History ==
This was the home of Nobel laureate for Literature, writer Patrick White and his partner, Manoly Lascaris from 1964 until White's death in 1990.

Highbury was built on an early twentieth-century subdivision of the western perimeter of Centennial Park. William Kerr, a jeweller, purchased the land in 1908 and, in approximately 1913, occupied the house designed for him by William Nixon, a well-known Sydney architect.

William Mark Nixon (1859-1931) entered private practice in partnership with J. S. Adam in the early 1890s, having previously worked in the Colonial Architect's Office and the Railways Department. Commissions undertaken with Adam included additions to St Andrew's College, University of Sydney and a new residence for its Principal, the remodelling of St George's Hall, Newtown, St Clement's Anglican Church, Mosman, Presbyterian churches at Singleton and Newcastle, hospitals, schools, stores. He is said to have designed "many fine residences in the suburbs and country". Nixon later practised in partnership with his son, Charles Ashwin Nixon until his death after service in World War I. Nixon worked until his retirement in 1930.

Highbury was built in the new residential area known as Centennial Park, which had been hived off by the state government and sold to pay for the creation of a new park, also to be known as Centennial Park. The government specified that certain types of buildings could not be built, for example, terraced houses, to raise the standard of housing in the new suburb. Large detached homes like Highbury became the norm in the area. Kerr lived in the house until his death in 1954, after which it was acquired by the electrical contractor, Frederick Angles. In 1964 the property was transferred to Patrick White.

Patrick White (1912–1990) is regarded as Australia's most famous writer. He is the only Australian to have been awarded the Nobel Prize for literature and is widely studied in schools and universities around the world. White is also recognised for his attempts at an Australian approach to English literature.

White and his partner, Manoly Lascaris, moved to Centennial Park from their previous home at Castle Hill. White's mother died in 1963 around the time Patrick and Manoly were preparing "Dogwoods" (at Castle Hill) for sale. The suburbs had started to encroach on the property (at Castle Hill) and White decided to leave for a house closer to the centre of Sydney where his interests - music, theatre, film and friends - were concentrated. They used some of White's inheritance money to buy 20 Martin Road and moved there in 1964.

White was attracted by the open environment of Centennial Park, the proximity to the life of the inner city, the opportunity for a large, light and airy living area, combined sitting room, hall and dining room, modern furniture, polished floorboards with rugs and large wall spaces for painting. Patrick White chose the house and the neighbourhood very carefully for the purpose of his writing in 1964, at which time he wrote to his publisher "I hope to take root in this new house... It will be closer to the source of something I want to write during my remaining years.".

At Centennial Park he wrote The Vivisector and other works. The house and its environs were the setting for events and scenes in White's work. It provided the template for the house where Elizabeth Hunter - who was based on White's mother - was dying in his novel The Eye of the Storm (1973) and for elements of buildings in several other novels. During White's 26 years here a further six novels and two collections of short fiction were published. He also returned to the theatre in the late 1970s, and landmark productions of his plays were directed by two upcoming stars of the Australian theatre, Jim Sharman and Neil Armfield.

He also became involved in environmental and other public issues in the 1970s and 1980s, partly prompted by threats to the Park. Patrick White even threatened to leave the country if the house was demolished as part of the proposed Olympic sports complex in Centennial Park (it was to be resumed along with 36 others (as part of this proposal) in 1972. As part of this protest against the demolition of his house, Patrick White commented in 1972 "No snail likes to have his house crushed. Unlike the snail I can build another. But, unlike the snail, part of me would be left behind". He entertained widely at Highbury, including many famous Australian figures, including regular visitors (until splits occurred) such as Geoffrey and Ninette Dutton, Sidney and Cynthia Nolan, and Barry Humphries.

The house included a large collection of White's furniture and art collections. Part of his extensive artwork collection was donated to the Art Gallery of NSW. Patrick White's ashes were scattered in Centennial Park.

== Description ==
Single storey Federation Bungalow style house, built in 1913, with surrounding gardens. The house includes a collection of post-war furniture, artworks and books that were purchased by Patrick White.

Interiors

The internal alterations made by Patrick White and Manoly Lascaris were similar to their approach to their previous residence at Castle Hill in 1953 and combined several popular ingredients of modern interior design of the 1950s and 1960s. White and Lascaris retained the floor plan but removed the remaining Edwardian features and prior decorations, including the Edwardian glass doors, joinery and ceiling mouldings, infilled fireplaces, wallpaper, carpet and faux marble chimneypieces. In their place, White and Lascaris painted all of the walls white, described by White as "the only background for pictures", introduced picture rails in all rooms to hang the artworks, and replaced the carpet with polished timber floors of medium sheen and a light stain, covered with Persian rugs, together with black and white vinyl tiles in the hall, stairway, back porch, and first floor bathroom, and brown linoleum in the kitchen. Electric oil heaters replaced the fireplaces, and bookshelves provided a place for small objects, fulfilling the role of a fireplace mantelpiece.

Artworks were hung throughout the house, many purchased from the Watters Gallery at Darlinghurst or painted by and gifts from friends of White and Lascaris, together with photos and posters from productions of Patrick White's plays, and personal photographs of Patrick and Manoly with friends. The collection includes the painting that inspired White's work "The Aunt's Story". Smaller artworks were even hung in the service rooms of the kitchen, bathrooms and laundry, hung together in defined groups. The careful decoration and arrangement of the kitchen reflected Patrick White's interest in cooking and the time he spent in the kitchen in this pursuit. Throughout White's occupation of the house, the collection of artworks were changed and renewed. At various times White donated some of his collection to the Art Gallery of NSW, such as artworks by de Maistre, Nolan and Whitely, to provide space for new works and fresh inspiration, and also due to ending friendships with the artists. A feature of the interior in the entrance hall is a collection of Greek icons and artworks, called 'Manoly's shrine' in William Yang's book. This formal arrangement of small, intensely coloured artworks provides a counterpoint or balance to the large paintings which dominate the sitting room and dining room. Beyond, is a large Bokhara antique wall hanging that was purchased by Manoly in Egypt, which provides a focus in the hall at its junction with the stairs.

Gifts from friends of White's and memorabilia are found throughout the house on cupboards and book cases, such as small objects, sculptures, pottery and framed photographs, which demonstrate the life, values, friendships and interests of White and Lascaris. For example, the Lyrebird feathers in the sitting room from Withycombe, Mt Wilson, were a valued gift from Lizzie Clark, Patrick White's former nurse and "real mother". Likewise, a small trunk in Patrick White's bedroom had belonged to Lizzie Clark and contains her old papers. A pug cushion was made for Patrick White his friend, Kate Fitzpatrick's mother, and paintings were gifted from Margot Lewers and Ninette Dutton. Several paintings were painted by White's niece Luciana Arrighi and one by his cousin, Peggy Garland.

The building's collection of post-war domestic furniture of Australian and international design, reflects the adventurous taste of Patrick White and his partner, as well as the early history of Sydney's most innovative modern furniture maker and retailer of the 1950s and 1960s, Artes Studio. Most of the furniture was purchased from Artes Studio. The sitting room was fitted out by White with furniture from Artes Studio including table, chairs, sideboard and cupboard. Other modern chairs, three bookcases, and a set of small tables were subsequently purchased from Artes studio, which included a selection of Australian and imported modern designs. Several of the remaining pieces are likely to have been purchased from Marion Hall Best. The new light fittings installed throughout the house were supplied by Finlandia. The floor rugs were purchased over time by White from Cadry's in Sydney and during overseas trips. The Persian Bokhara rug in the sitting room was purchased with the prize money from the Miles Franklin Award in 1958. The garden furniture was first sighted by White in Paris, tracked to a New York supplier and then to an agent in Melbourne. The only period furniture is a bentwood rocking chair, a favourite of White's which he purchased at a shop in Bondi, and the two revolving bookcases, that were purchased by placing an advertisement in the Sydney Morning Herald. A stool is another item brought from the previous house, which at Castle Hill was used for milking and later was used for waiting for the opening of the Macquarie Galleries Christmas sale.

White's plays and novels included commentary on interiors, including humorous and derogatory comments about the fussiness of drawing rooms, with nests of little tables, and "living life behind holland". Significantly, there are no Holland or Venetian blinds at Highbury. The curtains are a combination of modern textured open net with heavier patterned curtains, falling straight without tie backs. Four Thai silk curtains made by Marion Hall Best for their previous house were altered to make two curtains for the dining room windows. Curtains for all other windows were custom made by Finlandia, including the sitting room, Patrick White's study and first floor bedrooms.

Every room and the hall had bookcases, overflowing with books. The extensive collection of Patrick White's books included 20th Century literature, biographies, art and travel books. Many of the books are signed presentation copies to Patrick White from other authors, and contain White's own annotations, signature and his bookplate designed by Adrian Feint. These include books relating to White's school and university days. The collection also includes possibly the most complete collection of all of his published works, including works in first edition, foreign language translations, and in excess of thirty literary magazines and journals with articles by Patrick White in many languages. Several of these books are very rare in Australia. The books were bequeathed by Patrick White to the State Library of NSW.

While minor alterations to the building interiors have occurred since the death of Patrick White, primarily for the repair or replacement of worn furnishings, the interiors remains essentially intact from the Patrick White era. Some alterations include the donation of Patrick White's desk, chair and typewriter to the State Library, and the donation of his artworks to the Art Gallery of NSW. A new refrigerator replaced the 1964 original, work bed covers and curtains have been replaced, and additional bookshelves inserted. The linoleum in the kitchen has been replaced and the worn tiles removed from the back porch. The furniture of the sitting room was rearranged when a TV was introduced.

Gardens

When Patrick White and Manoly Lascaris moved to Highbury in 1964, the garden was relatively bare. Existing landscaping included a grassed buffalo front lawn flanking a red cement path, a few small trees in the front garden, a rose garden near the front fence, and trees next door on the double block of No. 22 and 24. White and Lascaris valued a garden and were responsible for establishing the majority of the existing plantings and garden structures. The gum trees and two surviving pines were planted by Lascaris and White. The pine trees were grown from three seeds collected at Manoly's request by the photographer Laurence Le Guay from three different locations in Rome, and the River Red Gums were sourced from Mr Angles' uncles' property on the Macintyre River, NSW. The plantings reflected Manoly Lascaris interest in attracting the birdlife to the garden. A bay laurel tree was planted amongst the gums. The red oxide cement path, rear tiled paving and the entrance side passage were covered with their own special mix of selected river pebbles aggregate and cement. The front brick and concrete fence was commissioned from a builder by White and Lascaris to replace the dilapidated picket fence. The design was discussed prior to their departure for an overseas trip and was described as like the style of a Byzantine temple. Although White and Lascaris were reputedly surprised by the completed fence on their return, the new fence was retained.

In the rear garden, the parapet brick wall above the garage facing the lane was also added by White and Lascaris for added privacy, and the pergola was constructed over part of the concrete slab garage roof top terrace in Redwood timber. The grape vine was planted to cover the pergola, which was grown from a cutting transported from Manoly Lascaris' garden at Castle Hill. The pergola area formed the centre of the outdoor social life enjoyed by White, Lascaris and their friends, including outdoor dining, a new and cosmopolitan concept for the 1960s in Sydney. Potted plants are a feature of the garden, especially at the side and rear. Potted herbs were used by Patrick White, who was a keen cook and host. The large cement and terracotta pot plants were also transported from Castle Hill.

White and Lascaris also installed a small copper and masonry fountain outside Patrick White's study, designed by the foremost modernist sculpture Garlad Lewers, a friend of White and Lascaris. White and Lascaris moved the sculpture from their previous house at Castle Hill when they moved to Highbury. Other garden installations by White and Lascaris included a pair of small clam shells that were house warming gifts, and a small sandstone bird basin carved by Manoly Lascaris and relocated from Castle Hill. Selected "field stones" and concrete paving stones were arranged in the garden to create nooks and to form an attractive junction between the lawn and plants, and between the house and garden.

=== Condition ===
As at 8 September 1998, good. Fairly intact from 1913, excellent integrity from the Patrick White era 1964–1990.

=== Modifications and dates ===
- c. 1913 - House constructed, designed by William M Nixon for William Kerr (the house was constructed in mirror reversal of Nixon's floor plan).
- c. 1920s - Alterations by William Kerr (designer unknown), possibly including enclosure of the front and rear balconies and the replacement of the french doors to the verandah.
- 1955 - Alterations by Mrs Angles senior for Mr and Mrs Frederick Angles including replacement of most fireplaces, refitting of bathroom, kitchen and laundry (new kitchen window and laundry copper), replacement of door furniture and painting the exterior of the house white with blue trim.
- c. 1964 - Alterations designed by McConnell Smith & Johnson for Patrick White, including removal of fireplaces, construction of new upstairs bathroom, removal of splayed architraves and ceiling decorations, interior decorative scheme of white walls and black-and-white tiled halls.
- Post 1990 - Since Patrick White's death, the house has been well maintained by the Perpetual Trustee (PT) Company. Their files note annual repairs to the slate roof, and some minor alterations such as the renewal of kitchen flooring and the replacement of the chain wire enclosure at the rear by a solid fibre cement wall.

== Heritage listing ==
As at 21 October 2004, 20 Martin Road is of outstanding significance for its long-standing association with the leading Australian author, Patrick White, and his books. Patrick White is widely regarded as Australia's most celebrated and most famous author, and remains Australia's first and only recipient of the Nobel Prize for literature. Patrick White was remarkable not only for his international recognition, but for his originality for the time in his portrayal and pride in the Australian way of life, Australian landscape and Australian history that in the words of the Nobel Prize citation introduced a "new continent" to world literature, as well as a new perspective on national identity for many Australians.

The house, interiors and gardens provide a rare and remarkably intact record of the writing environment, lifestyle, inspiration, tastes, activities and interests of Patrick White at the peak of his career from 1964 until his death in 1990. Much of his collection of artworks, books and post-war furniture previously housed at 20 Martin Road also remains available in public collections of the Art Gallery of NSW and the State Library. Several of White's major later works were written during his residency in the house, which together with the surrounding neighbourhood, inspired scenes, events and themes in these works.

As such, the house and grounds represent a site of major creative accomplishment in the history of Australian literature, which fostered the greatest ever international acclaim for an Australian author, and had a major impact on the recognition and development of Australian literature and the Australian national identity generally during the 20th century.

The house, built in 1913, represents an example of a Federation bungalow designed by the prominent Sydney architect, William Nixon, which forms part of the planned, high quality residential precinct of Centennial Park from the Federation era. The building also represents a fine example of modern 1960s interior conversion.

Patrick White House was listed on the New South Wales State Heritage Register on 19 November 2004 having satisfied the following criteria.

The place is important in demonstrating the course, or pattern, of cultural or natural history in New South Wales.

As the home and writing environment for 26 years of Patrick White, the house and grounds of 20 Martin Road represents a site of major creative accomplishment in the history of Australian literature, which fostered the greatest ever international recognition for an Australian author to date, together with the development of the Australian literary industry and national identity during the 20th Century.

No Australian writer has received the level of international recognition of Patrick White, before or after his time. Interest in and the status of Australian literature grew in parallel with the growing international status of Patrick White, which culminated in the award of the first Nobel Prize for literature to an Australian to Patrick White in 1973. The publication and success of most of Patrick White's major novels also coincided with the increasing professionalism of the study of Australian literature in Australia and internationally. For example, the first chair of Australian Literature was established at Sydney University in 1962 and the first specialist academic journal "Australian Literary Studies" began publication in 1963. (Elizabeth Webby 1996).

Patrick White was also remarkable in the development of Australian literature not only for his international recognition, but for his originality for the time in his portrayal and pride in the Australian way of life, Australian landscape and Australian history. White was a pioneer in Australian literature by demonstrating that Australia and Australian material could have an artistic value and significance. In the words of the Nobel prize citation, Whites' work introduced "a new continent" into world literature, as well as a new sense of national identity for many Australians.

The place has a strong or special association with a person, or group of persons, of importance of cultural or natural history of New South Wales's history.

20 Martin Road is of outstanding significance for its association with the internationally acclaimed Australian author, Patrick White, who is widely regarded as Australia's most famous author. The house, interiors and gardens provide an exceptional record of the writing environment, inspiration, lifestyle, tastes, activities and interests of Patrick White at the peak of his career from 1964 until his death in 1990.

Patrick White remains the first and only Australian to have been awarded the Nobel Prize for literature, the highest international literary accolade. White was the first Australian author to be studied in overseas universities, his works are widely studied in schools and universities worldwide, and have been the subject of numerous PhD theses not only in Australia, but also in countries such as India, China, Finland, Sweden, the USA and Canada. More books and articles have been published on White than any other Australian author. White was also the first Australian author to be admitted to the canon of world literature.

Patrick White chose the house and the neighbourhood very carefully for the purpose of his writing in 1964, at which time he wrote to his publisher "I hope to take root in this new house...It will be closer to the source of something I want to write during my remaining years." Several of White's major later works were written during his residency in the house, which together with the surrounding neighbourhood, inspired scenes, events and themes in these works. This included the major novels The Vivisector, Memoirs of Many in One, The Eye of the Storm, and The Twyborn Affair, and the plays Big Toys and Signal Driver. The house appears in many of these later novels, such as the city mansion of Mrs Elizabeth Hunter in The Eye of the Storm and the house of Alex Gray in Memoirs of the Many in the One. (David Marr 1996)

Patrick White lived at 20 Martin Road for 26 years until his death and was known to be very attached to the house, neighbourhood and Centennial Park, which he actively campaigned to protect in the 1970s. It was remarkable in itself that White chose to return to live in Australia at the time when it was more common for those that succeeded internationally to move overseas. Patrick White even threatened to leave the country if the house was demolished as part of the proposed Olympic sports complex in Centennial Park. As part of this protest against the demolition of his house, Patrick White commented in 1972 "No snail likes to have his house crushed. Unlike the snail I can build another. But, unlike the snail, part of me would be left behind".

Patrick White's ashes were scattered at Centennial Park. Patrick White is said to have not believed in an afterlife, and to have declared we "go" nowhere after death, but that he would haunt the place "as we haunt all the places where we have loved and suffered and worked".

The place is important in demonstrating aesthetic characteristics and/or a high degree of creative or technical achievement in New South Wales.

The house at 20 Martin Road, built in 1913, represents an example of a Federation bungalow designed by the prominent Sydney architect, William Nixon. It also demonstrates a fine example of modern 1960s interior conversion.

It represents one of the architect designed houses of the planned, high-quality residential precinct of Centennial Park established in 1888.

The place has a strong or special association with a particular community or cultural group in New South Wales for social, cultural or spiritual reasons.

20 Martin Road is valued by Australian and international contemporary communities for its association with the leading Australian author, Patrick White. The property is also highly valued by literary and wider communities for its direct connection to many of his acclaimed later works, as the place from where they originated, and in some cases the place where themes, events and scenes were inspired.

The value for Patrick White and his works has been well recorded, as the only Australian to have been awarded the Nobel Prize for literature, the highest international literary accolade. Patrick White and his works have inspired many postgraduate theses, critical essays, monographs and published tributes. Patrick White became the first Australian author to be admitted to the canon of world literature.

His works are also highly valued for their portrayal of Australian landscape, way of life and history, and have been attributed with the inspiration for other successful Australian authors, such as Judith Wright, Nicholas Haslack, Glen Tomasetti, Finola Moorhead and Humphrey McQueen. A view repeated by many is how White's vision of Australia taught them to see the country in a new way, and often, to find a new love for it. His work testifies to the enduring human values of humility, tolerance and the capacity to love and to care for other people and the natural environment, a vision that has had a great impact on countless readers of his books. Janet Kenny wrote that White's "vision of an Australia which offers opportunity to all Australians, which refrains from militarism and materialism, is an Australia I can love." Film maker Paul Cox records how "my basic love for Australia stems from his vision of the country, from his passionate understanding of this land". Critic Veronica Brady further wrote that "Patrick White matters for me because he helped me to settle into the world in this deep sense, a world that is Australian, not second-hand European".

The place has potential to yield information that will contribute to an understanding of the cultural or natural history of New South Wales.

20 Martin Road is significant for its rare potential to contribute to our understanding of the writings, interests and life of the author Patrick White and his partner Manoly Lascaris.

The place possesses uncommon, rare or endangered aspects of the cultural or natural history of New South Wales.

20 Martin Road is a very rare and intact record of the writing environment, lifestyle, interests and tastes of Australia's most famous author, Patrick White, over a period of 26 years at the peak of his career and acclaim. No other examples of his houses retain this level of integrity from the Patrick White occupation or from this period of his career.

The place is important in demonstrating the principal characteristics of a class of cultural or natural places/environments in New South Wales.

20 Martin Road represents an outstanding example of the writing and creative environment of a leading Australian writer of the 20th Century.

The house also represents a Federation bungalow from 1913, which forms part of the high quality, planned precinct of Centennial Park from the Federation era.

The building interiors represent a fine example of a modern interior conversion from the 1960s.

== See also ==
- Australian residential architectural styles
