= The Hanging Garden (White novel) =

Novel by Patrick White

- First edition hardback
- Author: Patrick White
- Language: English
- Genre: Literary fiction
- Publisher: Random House Australia
- Publication date: April 2, 2012
- Publication place: Australia
- Media type: Print
- Pages: 240 pp
- ISBN: 9781742752655

The Hanging Garden is an unfinished novel by Australian author and Nobel Prize winner Patrick White. The novel was published on April 2, 2012 by Random House Australia. The published edition of the novel is estimated to be about a third of what the ultimate length of the finished product would have been and was discovered on White's desk after his death.

== Plot ==
The novel was left largely unfinished, with the book initially planned to have three parts. The first part, the only part that White had completed, centers around Eirene Sklavos and Gilbert Horsfall, two children around the age of thirteen that have been brought as refugees to a garden in Sydney Harbour, Australia in order to seek shelter from the effects of World War II. Both children have lost parents due to the war. Eirene's father was executed in a Greek prison as a Communist while Gilbert's mother died during the Blitz in England. The two children are housed together with Essie Bulpit in Neutral Bay, despite Eirene having living relatives close by. The two children slowly find themselves drawn to each other, eventually becoming extremely close and spending much of their time in the unkempt garden surrounding Essie's home. The story follows Eirene and Gilbert as they deal with the hassles and expectations of everyday life, eventually culminating in an inevitable parting of ways when the war ends. White's story ends here, with the only known note as to any future developments in the story mentioned in a note White wrote at the end of the first part of the book stating "14 in 1945, 50 in 1981".

== Development ==
White first began working on the novel in the 70s and 80s, but stopped working on the novel to focus on theater and political activism. White died before completing the novel, with him passing along instructions to his literary executor Barbara Mobbs that he wanted the work destroyed, a sentiment he had also expressed to the National Library of Australia when asked for some of his personal documents. She later discovered the novel among a set of personal papers on White's desk. Mobbs initially hesitated over publishing Hanging Garden, stating that she was afraid that the work would ruin White's literary reputation, a sentiment that was echoed by some reviewers. She eventually decided to have the manuscript transcribed from its handwritten state, stating that Hanging Garden "deserves to see the light of day". The novel was transcribed by Sydney University professors Margaret Harris and Elizabeth Webby, using a grant from the Australian Research Council, with Random House Publishing picking up the rights to the work. The transcribers have commented that the process was "challenging" due to White's handwriting and punctuation as well as the inclusion of colloquial Greek phrases, which necessitated finding a translator whose "Greek wasn't scholarly". One of the transcribers also theorized that the work wasn't abandoned, but was instead put on hold due to a note at the book's ending that read "14 in 1945, 50 in 1981".

Of the novel's ending, White told his friends that the ending was "all in my head" but that "such things don't matter in the face of nuclear war, and that I can resist more effectively through plays and public appearances". White had also been vocal when it came to the preservation of any unpublished works, notes, or private documents. In a response to the National Library of Australia, White stated "I can't let you have my 'papers', because I don't keep any...Anything unfinished when I die is to be burnt."

== Reception ==
Critical reception for the unfinished work has been positive, with The Monthly writing that it was like a "blancmange" in that it was "perfectly smooth, rapidly consumed, easily digested". The Australian praised The Hanging Garden, calling it a "rich bequest". The UK Spectator cited the book's "arresting images" as a highlight, but stated that new readers should begin their reading with White's earlier works such as The Vivisector and The Eye of the Storm. The Sydney Morning Herald called it a "fitting coda to White's achievement" and expressed regret that the book remained unfinished and that the ultimate fates of the two main characters would remain unknown. The paper also stated that the book "[suggested] the author was moving towards a more humane view of the world". The Herald Scotland also expressed regret and sadness that the work was never completed, calling the book "a haunting and tantalising postscript."
