= The Season at Sarsaparilla =

Play by Patrick White

The Season at Sarsaparilla: a charade of suburbia in 2 acts is a 1962 play by Australian writer Patrick White.

It concerns three households, the Pogsons, the Boyles, and the Knotts, in the fictional suburb of Sarsaparilla. This play was written shortly after the first performance of earlier play The Ham Funeral and while Riders in the Chariot was being prepared for publication.

The Season at Sarsaparilla premiered in 1962 directed by John Tasker for the Adelaide University Theatre Guild in association with the Australian Elizabethan Theatre Trust. This was the basis for a 1963 professional production at Sydney's Theatre Royal, presented by J.C. Williamson's.

Other major productions have included:

- a 1962 Union Theatre Repertory Company (Melbourne) production directed by John Sumner
- a 1976 Old Tote Theatre Company (Sydney) production directed by Jim Sharman
- a 1984 State Theatre Company of South Australia (Adelaide) production directed by Neil Armfield
- a 2007 Sydney Theatre Company production directed by Benedict Andrews (which was nominated for the 2007 Helpmann Award for Best Play)
