= Philip Salom =

Australian poet and novelist

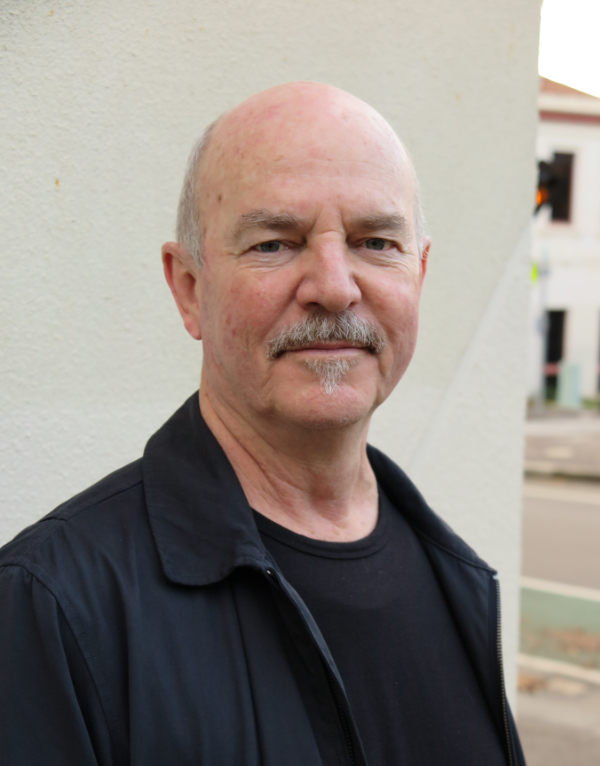
- Philip Salom, April 2020
- Born: Stephen Philip Salom; 8 August 1950 (age 76); Bunbury, Western Australia
- Other names: Alan Fish, MA Carter
- Occupations: Poet and novelist
- Spouse: Meredith Kidby
- Website: www.philipsalom.com

Philip Salom (born 8 August 1950) is an Australian poet and novelist, whose poetry books have drawn widespread acclaim. His 15 collections of poetry and six novels are noted for their originality and expansiveness and surprising differences from title to title. His poetry has won awards in Australia and the UK. His novel Waiting was shortlisted for Australia's prestigious 2017 Miles Franklin Literary Award, the 2017 Prime Minister's Literary Awards and the 2016 Victorian Premier's Literary Awards. His well-reviewed novel The Returns (2019) was a finalist in the 2020 Miles Franklin Award. In 2020, during the COVID-19 pandemic, he published The Fifth Season. Since then, he has published Sweeney and the Bicycles (2022). His most recent poetry collection is Hologrammatical (2023).

In 2021 Salom was recognised with the Outstanding Achievement Award of the 4th Boao International Poetry Award.

== Biography ==
Growing up on a farm in Brunswick Junction in the South West region of Western Australia, Salom had an isolated childhood before boarding at Bunbury during his high school years. He went on to study agriculture at Muresk Agricultural College. He then worked for two years as a research assistant on the Northam Research Station. While studying Agricultural Science at the University of Western Australia, he developed his passion for the arts, painting and singing in the university choir. Uninterested in his course, he left university, took various casual jobs, and started writing on a 1972 painting trip to New Zealand. On returning to Perth, he enrolled in Curtin University's Literature and Creative Writing course, one of the first of its kind in Australia.

On graduating he took a job with the Public Service in his old area of agriculture. His first poetry collection was published by Fremantle Arts Centre Press in 1980. Since then there have been many poetry collections and six novels. Salom has won both national and international acclaim for his poetry. For most of these years he taught Creative Writing at Curtin and Murdoch University in Western Australia. Late in 1997 he moved with his family to Melbourne, Victoria. In the next years he lectured at Deakin University and finally at the University of Melbourne. At the end of 2008 he resigned from lecturing and since then has been writing full-time.

His writing is distinctive for its metaphoric richness and expansive vision. It is also hugely various from title to title; his creative restlessness extends not only to style but also to conceptual paradigms. Since his first collection, many of his books have depicted imagined worlds or explored conceptually contained sequences - books such as The Projectionist, Sky Poems, The Rome Air Naked, The Well Mouth and Keepers. Keepers is part of a trilogy which is extended through two more books, The Keeper of Fish and Keeping Carter, books ostensibly written by Alan Fish and MA Carter, respectively. These are heteronyms for Salom's recent work.

Since the Keepers trilogy, Flying Island Books (Macao) published Salom's pocket book of poems, Between Yes and No, in English and Mandarin, translated by Chris Song Zijiang and Iris Fan Xing. And in 2015 Alterworld (published by Puncher & Wattmann) completes another trilogy - Sky Poems, The Well Mouth and Alterworld - of three imagined worlds in one set of covers. Hologrammatical (2023) is his latest collection.

In 2016 his third novel Waiting was published. In the Weekend Australian reviewer Peter Pierce called it a "brilliant and unsettling novel". He adds: "Philip Salom has unleashed Australia's oddest literary couple since the elderly twin brothers Arthur and Waldo Brown in Patrick White's The Solid Mandala (1966)". The book has received outstanding reviews and acclaim for its extraordinary characterisation and its striking prose style. Michael McGirr says: "Waiting is a tour de force of sustained and affectionate wit". Judges' comments are available on the 2017 Miles Franklin website and the 2017 Prime Minister's Awards website. Below are some quotes from these:

"Waiting is poignant, compassionate and droll; it is never maudlin nor idealised. Salom's prose, poetic and frequently playful, bestows a multiplicity of incidental insights en route, yet never condescends to its subjects nor patronises its readers. As rollicking as it is original and affecting, Waiting is a highly readable addition to Australian literature." (Miles Franklin.)

"The novel vibrates with the language of the street and the speaking voices of the many characters is brilliantly captured by Salom, whose poetry background is apparent. The suburban rooming house which is central to the novel reverberates with wit and intensity and the cast of characters that live and die in this boarding house is achingly authentic. Their impoverished circumstances, daily struggles with health and mental capacity are all handled with sensitivity and a unique voice."

The Returns was shortlisted for the 2020 Miles Franklin Award.

Salom has performed as a guest writer and lecturer in the United States, Canada, United Kingdom, Italy, Yugoslavia, Singapore and New Zealand.

== Bibliography ==
=== Poetry ===
- The Silent Piano. (Fremantle Arts Centre, 1980) ISBN 978-0-909144-31-9
- The Projectionist, A Sequence. (Fremantle Arts Centre, 1983) ISBN 978-0-909144-69-2
- Sky Poems. (Fremantle Arts Centre Press, 1987) ISBN 978-0-949206-19-0
- Barbecue of the Primitives. (University of Queensland, 1989) ISBN 978-0-7022-2221-4
- Tremors. (Pamphlet Poets, National Library of Australia, 1992) ISBN 978-0-642-10532-5
- Feeding the Ghost. (Penguin, 1993) ISBN 978-0-14-058692-3
- The Rome Air Naked. (Penguin, 1996) ISBN 978-0-14-058773-9
- New and Selected Poems. (Fremantle Arts Centre, 1998) ISBN 978-1-86368-218-3
- A Cretive Life. (sic.) (Fremantle Arts Centre, 2001) ISBN 978-1-86368-300-5
- The Well Mouth. (Fremantle Arts Centre, 2005) ISBN 978-1-921064-24-1 review
- The Family Fig Trees. (Picaro Press, 2007) ISSN 1444-8424
- Keepers. (Puncher & Wattmann, 2010) ISBN 978-1-921450-39-6
- The Keeper of Fish. (Puncher & Wattmann, 2011) ISBN 978-1-921450-46-4
- Keeping Carter. (Puncher & Wattmann, 2012) ISBN 978-1-921450-47-1
- Between Yes and No. (Flying Island Press, 2014) ISBN 978-99965-42-75-6
- Alterworld. (Puncher & Wattmann, 2015) ISBN 978-1-92218-666-9
- Hologrammatical. (Puncher & Wattmann, 2023) ISBN 978-1-922571-94-6

=== Novels ===
- Playback
- Toccata & Rain: A novel
- "Demands of survival". The Australian. Archived from the original on 12 July 2017.
- The Returns. (Transit Lounge, 2019) ISBN 978-1-925760-26-2
- The Fifth Season (Transit Lounge, 2020) ISBN 978-1-925760-64-4
- Sweeney and the Bicycles (Transit Lounge, 2022) ISBN 978-1-925760-99-6

== Awards ==
- 1981: Commonwealth Poetry Prize (London) for The Silent Piano
- 1984: WA Literary Award for Poetry ( now Premiers Prize for Poetry) for The Projectionist
- 1984: South Australian Literary Award for Poetry - second prize – for The Projectionist
- 1987: Commonwealth Poetry Prize (London) for Overall Best Book of Poetry for Sky Poems
- 1987: WA Literary Award for Poetry (now Premiers Prize for Poetry) in 1987 - Sky Poems
- 1987: The Age Book of the Year (only poetry book shortlisted) for Sky Poems
- 1992: WA Premiers Prize for Fiction for Playback
- 1996: Newcastle Poetry Prize for "Elegy for My Father"
- 2000: Newcastle Poetry Prize for "Preservation: Things in Glass"
- 2003: Christopher Brennan Award (Lifetime Award for Poetry of "sustained quality and distinction")
- 2005: Sydney Morning Herald Best Books of the Year for The Well Mouth
- 2006: Adelaide Review Best Books of the Year for The Well Mouth
- 2016: Victorian Premier's Prize shortlisted for Waiting
- 2017: Miles Franklin Award for Literature 2017 shortlisted for Waiting
- 2017: Prime Minister's Award for Literature 2017 shortlisted for Waiting
- 2020: Miles Franklin Award for Literature, finalist (The Returns)
- 2020: Queensland Literary Awards, Fiction Book Award, shortlisted (The Returns)
- 2021: Miles Franklin Award for Literature, 2021 longlisted for The Fifth Season
- 2021: Outstanding Achievement Award of the 4th Boao International Poetry Award
