= James Clifford (artist) =

Australian painter

James Clifford (1936–1987) was an Australian painter who borrowed styles from other artists, in the manner of psychedelic rock music artists who came after the major pop artists and were forerunners of the postmodern appropriation movement of the 1980s.

James Clifford was born in Muswellbrook, New South Wales in 1936 and in the sixties moved to Sydney, where he studied with Desiderius Orban and exhibited at Watters Gallery. He worked in various styles and became distinctive early on, combining Hard-edge painting with landscape and seascape painting in kaleidoscopic perspectives, tropical landscapes, Art Nouveau borders and the surrealism of Gordon Onslow Ford, later incorporating collage, occasionally text art, Decalcomania. Clifford was openly same sex attracted however he described himself as a homophobic homosexual. His paintings of the human figure were usually male homoerotic nudes. His late paintings were Lyrical abstraction and have been compared to Ralph Balson's matter paintings of the early 1960s.

The novelist Patrick White, famously associated with painters Ian Fairweather, Sidney Nolan, Brett Whiteley and Chris O'Doherty, was collecting Clifford's work from the mid-sixties until the mid-eighties. Both Clifford and White had family connections in the Hunter Region of New South Wales.

Clifford, Chris O'Doherty, Brett Whiteley, and the painter / set designer Desmond Digby were the four young artists collected most avidly by White, and he bequeathed the works to the Art Gallery of New South Wales. Curator Daniel Thomas remarked of White's "personal aesthetic": "It was obvious to me that he went with anything that had spiky forms". Clifford was a favourite of White, who described Clifford as one of the best two living painters in Australia. The author of Patrick White, Painter Manque, Helen Verity Hewitt has argued Sidney Nolan and Whiteley were the main Australian artist influences on White's writing, although she compared Clifford himself him to a central character in White's 1961 novel Riders in the Chariot, Alf Dubbo, an emotionally uncertain young painter. Art historian Helen Verity Hewitt has noted that some observers felt White's interest in Clifford was "misplaced". Curator Barry Pearce has said of White's art collection: "A lot of the reasons Patrick bought particular paintings died with him ... he was slightly subversive, buying paintings to help out artists who were not sanctified by officials in museums".

Hewitt quotes Elwyn Lynn musing on the painter's "fragile, diaphanous, lyric ephemerality"..."poised on uncertainty, their lyricism almost disguising their anxiety" (p. 87, Patrick White, Painter Manqué). Clifford received favourable mention from a small number of notable art critics: Bernard Smith, James Gleeson, Elwyn Lynn and Gary Catalano. Catalano wrote of Clifford as a casualty of the "provincial" Australian hard edged painting scene of the late 1960s, on which he commented: "Only a guilty provincial culture can so neglect its own, more native sources of renewal, and apply itself so assidiously to borrowed artistic fashions. And that The Field represented a fashion and not a convention is shown by the work of some artists who emerged at the same time as the exhibition ... to Lynn the artist who seemed 'most defiantly bored with the canons of flatness' was the Sydney painter, James Clifford." ... "His Cinematic Landscapes are a rapid series of takes: close-up shots mingle with distant vistas – there you see nothing but sky – and there was a forceful view of the ground. Despite their originality, they were not much admired by the critics, largely because they did not seem to be reflecting the going international concerns".

Painter Richard Larter was an admirer of Clifford's skill in marbleizing and decalcomania. Larter wrote of Clifford's marbled paintings: "These works ranged from abstracts (like the ones in this exhibition) to paintings where waves, sandy beaches, cliffs, hills, swirling clouds in blue skies, expanses of seas and harbours with waves breaking and great sunsets were suggested. The paint used was mainly household enamel paint, the colours which ran into each other were usually cream, silver, white, ultramarine blue, pale blue, yellow, red and green. What was truly remarkable was that if you truly looked at the paintwork there was no sign of any brushwork. It was as if the paint had been magically placed on the canvas. Yet how spendidly had that paint been placed; one could discern white top waves breaking, sanded beaches, cliff faces, whole headlands with rolling hills beyond and turbulent water, not just breakers".

The organic forms and psychedelic effects found in Clifford's art are in keeping with the trends in imagery associated with psychedelic rock in the late 1960s in London.

Later travels included time at the Sri Aurobindo Ashram at Pondicherry, South India. Four years spent living in India during the 1970s came to an end when Clifford returned to Sydney in a poor state of health, tubercular, and emotionally distraught. He spent the remainder of his life in Sydney and his art was collected by a few noted Sydney art collectors.

Collectors of Clifford's work included Macquarie Galleries director Lucy Swanton, prominent art publisher Mervyn Horton, Gowings menswear store heiress Mollie Gowing and the painter Max Watters, whose collection is housed at the Muswellbrook Regional Arts Centre. A retrospective of Clifford's work was held at the Muswellbrook Regional Arts Centre in 2008.

Eagles Preening circa 1980, by James Clifford.

== See also ==
- Australian art
- Psychedelic art

== Bibliography ==
- Catalano, Gary. The Years of Hope
- Horton, Mervyn. Present Day Art in Australia. Ure Smith 1969
- Legge, Geoffrey. Ralph Balson and James Clifford
- Legge, Geoffrey A Growing Reputation.
- Lindsay, Robert. (ed) The Seventies. Australian Paintings and Tapestries from the collection of National Australia Bank. National Bank of Australasia Limited. 1982 Melbourne.
- Meacham, Steve. Art experts ponder why White knew what he liked. The Sydney Morning Herald, 4 September 2004.
- Smith, Bernard. Australian Painting
- Verity Hewitt, Helen. Patrick White, Painter Manque
- Paddy's Pictures by Chris Wallace-Crabbe. Australian Book Review March 2003
- Westwood, Matthew. Legacy of a Gifted Man, The Australian. 12 March 2009
- Yang, William. Patrick White: The Late Years
