= The Tree of Man =

1955 novel by Patrick White

- First edition (US)
- Author: Patrick White
- Cover artist: George Salter
- Language: English
- Publisher: Viking Press (US); Eyre & Spottiswoode (UK)
- Publication date: August 15, 1955 (US); 1956 (UK)
- Publication place: Australia
- Media type: Print (hardback and paperback)
- Pages: 499
- OCLC: 247822285

The Tree of Man is the fourth published novel by the Australian novelist and 1973 Nobel Prize-winner, Patrick White.

== Plot ==
It is a domestic drama chronicling the lives of the Parker family and their changing fortunes over many decades. It is steeped in Australian folklore and cultural myth, and is recognised as the author's attempt to infuse the idiosyncratic way of life in the remote Australian bush with some sense of the cultural traditions and ideologies that the epic history of Western civilisation has bequeathed to Australian society in general. "When we came to live [in Castle Hill, Sydney]", White wrote, in an attempt to explain the novel, "I felt the life was, on the surface, so dreary, ugly, monotonous, there must be a poetry hidden in it to give it a purpose, and so I set out to discover that secret core, and The Tree of Man emerged.". The title comes from A. E. Housman's poetry cycle A Shropshire Lad, lines of which are quoted in the text.

The man returned to his chair on the edge of the room, and looked at the blank book, and tried to think what he would write in it. The blank pages were in themselves simple and complete. But there must be some simple words, within his reach, with which to throw further light. He would have liked to write some poem or prayer in the empty book, and for some time did consider that idea, remembering the plays of Shakespeare that he had read lying on his stomach as a boy, but any words that came to him were the stiff words of a half-forgotten literature that had no relationship with himself.

— Patrick White, The Tree of Man

The novel is one of three by White included in 1001 Books You Must Read Before You Die. The others are Voss and The Living and the Dead.

The first part of the book was translated into Mandarin by Jin Liqun, a Chinese literary scholar who subsequently joined the World Bank and eventually became the first President of the Asian Infrastructure Investment Bank.

== Reviews and criticism ==
James Stern of The New York Times wrote: "'The Tree of Man,' it seems to me, is a timeless work of art from which no essential element of life has been omitted. A magnifying glass has been laid over a microscopic world in the center of which loom, larger and larger, man and woman, married, bound by love, and from whom radiate the beauty and the tragedy of humanity." In the Times one day later, Orville Prescott called it "the finest novel I have read so far in 1955, a majestic and impressive work of genuine art that digs more deeply into the universal experience of human living than all save a few great books."

- Reviewed by Patrick Coady in Quadrant 1/1 (Summer 1956/57): 87–88.
