= The Solid Mandala =

Novel by Patrick White

- First edition cover
- Author: Patrick White
- Cover artist: Desmond Digby
- Language: English
- Genre: Fiction
- Publisher: Eyre & Spottiswoode
- Publication date: 1966
- Publication place: Australia
- Media type: Print (Cloth)
- Pages: 317 pp
- ISBN: 978-0-224-01247-8
- OCLC: 5137803
- Dewey Decimal: 823
- LC Class: PZ3.W58469 So 1976 PR9619.3.W5

The Solid Mandala is the seventh published novel by Australian author Patrick White, Nobel Prize winner of 1973, first published in 1966. It details the story of two brothers, Waldo and Arthur Brown, with a focus on the facets of their symbiotic relationship. The novel is set in the fictional suburb of Sarsaparilla, based on the Sydney suburb of Castle Hill where White lived on his return to Australia with his partner, Manoly Lascaris, in 1948, a setting he often employed in his other books, such as Riders in the Chariot. The book is typical of White's writing style, and is slow-paced, with little considerable action, instead focusing upon the inner turmoils of the aforementioned characters.

== The book ==
The book is split into four chapters, each narrated in the third-person omniscient limited style; by far the largest is the second, which is limited to Waldo Brown's point of view. Following this is a chapter told through Arthur Brown's view.

== The story ==
It tells the story of two brothers, Waldo and Arthur Brown, and the mutually dependent and mutually antagonistic relationship they share: Waldo is cold and supremely rational in his behaviour while Arthur is more warm-hearted and instinctual, so that together they represent what White saw as the two conflicting and complementary halves of human nature. Although Arthur would be considered by most in society as slightly "retarded", by the end of the novel he is shown to have a better grip on life than the conventional Waldo. The novel symbolizes the entire universe.

== Reception ==
It is notable for being heavily tipped to win the 1967 Miles Franklin Award, the third of White's novels to be nominated for the prize, until White personally intervened and withdrew it from consideration so that other writers might stand a chance of winning.

Arthur Calder-Marshall said on BBC Home Service that "Patrick White is a colossus among novelists. Voss has hitherto stood as his masterpiece. The Solid Mandala seems to me to rank beside it."

Francis King in The Sunday Telegraph said, "I am increasingly convinced that he is one of the five novelists at present at work in our language who is truly possessed of greatness."

== Notes ==
- Dedication: "For Gwen and David Moore".
- Epigraph:
  - 'There is another world, but it is in this one.' – Paul Eluard
  - 'It is not outside, it is inside: wholly within.' – Meister Eckhart
  - '...yet still I long for my twin in the sun...' – Patrick Anderson
  - 'It was an old and rather poor church, many of the ikons were without settings, but such churches are the best for praying in.' – Dostoevsky
