= A Fringe of Leaves =

1976 novel by Patrick White

- First edition cover
- Author: Patrick White
- Cover artist: Sidney Nolan, Mrs Fraser and Convict (oil and enamel on composition board, 1962–64) in the collection of the Queensland Art Gallery.
- Language: English
- Genre: Novel
- Published: 1976 (Jonathan Cape)
- Publication place: Australia
- Media type: Print (hardback and paperback)
- Pages: 405 pp
- ISBN: 0-224-00902-8
- OCLC: 1147089
- Dewey Decimal: 823
- LC Class: PR9619.3.W5 E9 1973

A Fringe of Leaves is the tenth published novel by the Australian novelist and 1973 Nobel Prize-winner Patrick White.

== Plot ==
... she fell back upon the dust, amongst intimations of the nightmare which threatened to re-shape itself around her. Her trembling only gradually subsided as she lay fingering the ring threaded into her fringe of leaves ...
A Fringe of Leaves, p 223

A young Cornish woman, Ellen Roxburgh, travels to the Australian colony of Van Diemen's Land (now Tasmania) in the early 1830s with her older husband, Austin, to visit his brother Garnet Roxburgh; Garnet was originally transported from England as a convict, but is now an empancipist and wealthy widower. After witnessing the brutalities of Van Diemen's Land, the Roxburghs embark on their return trip to England on the Bristol Maid. But the ship runs aground on the coral reef off the coast of what is now Queensland. Ellen is one of the few survivors, and the only one from one of two vessels, a leaky one in which passengers and crew travel to the shore. She is taken on by the Aboriginal people of the island, and later meets Jack Chance, a convict who has escaped from Moreton Bay (now Brisbane), the brutal penal settlement to the south. Chance escorts her through the dangerous coastal territory south to the outskirts of the settlement, but refuses to accompany her further for fear of the consequences of recapture, and returns to his exile. She returns to "civilisation" transformed and tormented by her experience with Garnet in Van Diemen's Land, with the Aboriginal people, and with Chance.

The novel sets in sharp relief the distinctions between men and women, whites and blacks, the convicts and the free, and English colonists and Australian settlers. The contrast between Ellen's rural Cornish background and the English middle class she has married into is also highlighted.

== Historical references ==
To indulge in such an unlikely fancy could not be regarded in any degree as a betrayal, but while she walked, her already withered fringe of leaves began deriding her shrunken thighs, and daylight struck an ironic glint out of the concealed wedding-ring.
A Fringe of Leaves, p 229

The shipwreck and rescue parts of the novel reflect the experiences of Eliza Fraser, who was also shipwrecked on Fraser Island (named after her husband Captain Jame Fraser who died there), met with an escaped convict who had lived alongside the island's Aboriginal people, and married a "Mr Jevons". She, however, eventually returned to the UK. White's novel is (arguably recursively) often cited about Fraser Island and Eliza Fraser.
