= William Nixon (architect) =

Australian architect

Councillor William Nixon

President of Hornsby Shire
- In office 1907–1909
- Preceded by: John Hunt
- Succeeded by: Lord Livingstone Ramsay

Alderman Municipality of Ashfield
- In office 1900–1906

Personal details
- Born: 31 May 1859 The Glebe, NSW
- Died: 5 June 1931 (aged 71) Beecroft, NSW
- Spouse: Ada (née Fox)
- Children: William Elliott (born 1887); Charles Ashwin (born 1889); Edwin George (born 1890); Allen Dalrymple (born 1893)
- Occupation: Architect
- Website: William Mark Nixon

William Mark Nixon (31 May 1859 – 5 June 1931) was an Australian architect active at the end of the 19th century and the first quarter of the 20th century. His work encompassed the styles of the Federation Bungalow in domestic design and Federation Free Classical in civic and commercial design. He was active in local government and was President of Hornsby Shire and an Alderman in the Municipality of Ashfield.

== Early life ==
Nixon was the son of Jane (née Graham) and William Nixon and was born in Sydney circa 1860. His father had emigrated from Hawick in Scotland with £30,000 from the sale of his family's woollen mills. On arrival in Australia this money was largely lost on poor gold mining investments. He began his working life with the New South Wales Colonial Architect's Office under James Barnet and in 1884 commenced as a draughtsman for the New South Wales Government Railways. In 1886, Nixon married Ada Fox, the daughter of a Church of England clergyman from Tumut, New South Wales.

== Architectural practice ==
In 1893, with four young sons, he started his own architectural practice in Pitt Street, Sydney, with only £30 of savings.

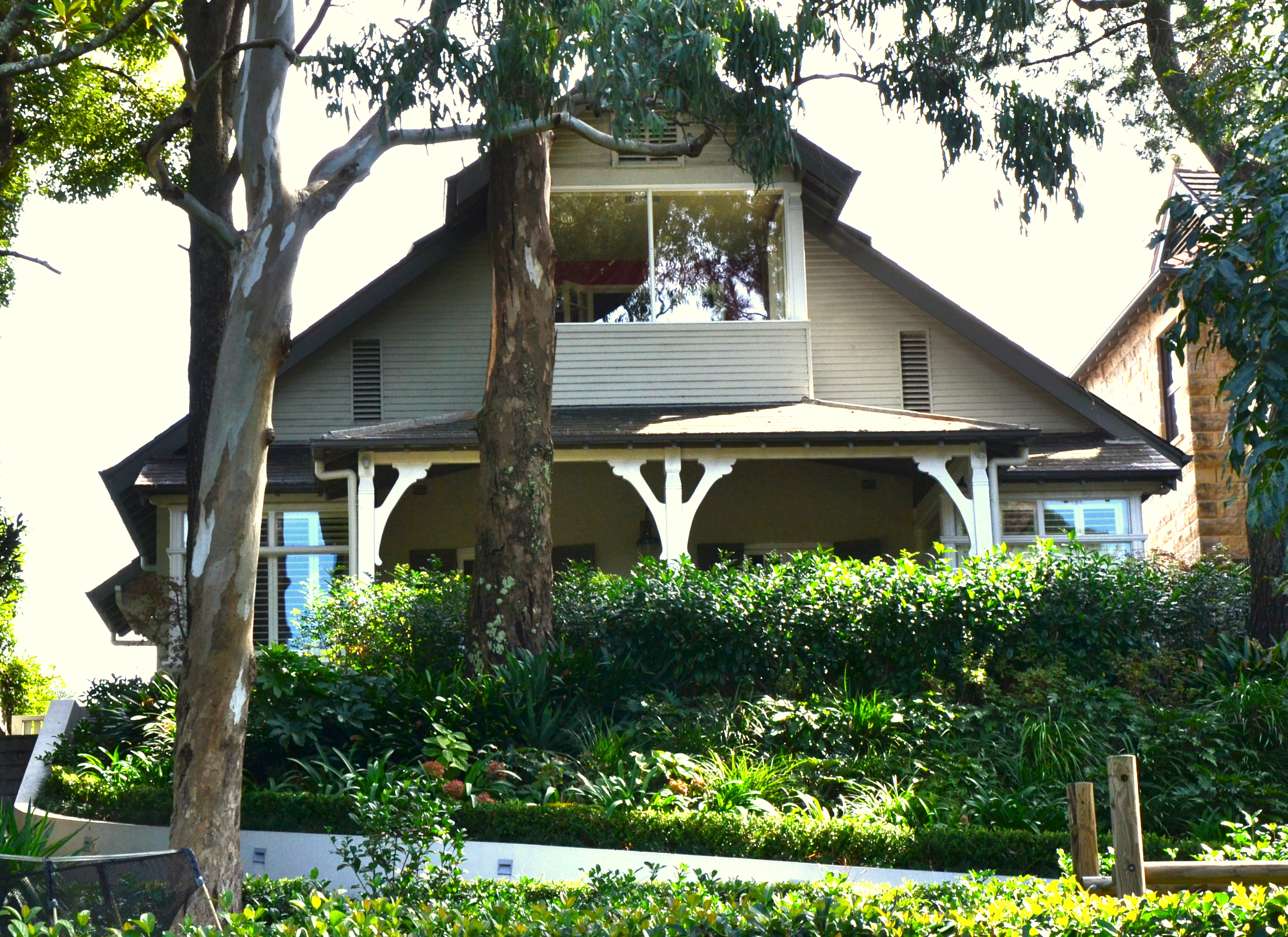
Highbury, in Centennial Park, Sydney

Architectural commissions included additions to St Andrew's College, University of Sydney and a new residence for its Principal, the remodeling of St George's Hall, Newtown, St Clement's Anglican Church, Mosman, Presbyterian churches at Singleton and Newcastle, hospitals, schools, stores. Amongst the houses he designed were Highbury, Centennial Park. Early in his career Nixon practiced with other architects including Herbert Dennis. In 1910 he took his son, Charles Ashwin Nixon, as his partner until his death on active service during World War I. Then he worked alone until his own retirement in 1930.

== Local Government ==
Nixon served as a Hornsby Shire Councilor from 1908 until 1922 and was Shire President from 1910 until 1913.
