= The Aunt's Story =

1948 novel by Patrick White

- First UK edition
- Author: Patrick White
- Language: English
- Publisher: Routledge & Kegan Paul (UK); Viking Press (US)
- Publication date: 1948
- Publication place: Australia
- Media type: Print (Hardback)
- Pages: 248
- ISBN: 978-1-74166-758-5
- OCLC: 231621806

The Aunt's Story is the third published novel by the Australian novelist and 1973 Nobel Prize-winner, Patrick White. It tells the story of Theodora Goodman, a lonely middle-aged woman who travels to France after the death of her mother, and then to America, where she experiences what is either a gradual mental breakdown or an epiphanic revelation.

The sun was still a manageable ball above the ringing hills as Lou went outside. She walked through this stiff landscape, carrying her cold and awkward hands. She thought about the cardboard aunt, Aunt Theodora Goodman, who was both a kindness and a darkness. Lou touched the sundial, on which the time had remained frozen. She was afraid, and sad, because there was some great intolerable pressure from which it is not possible to escape. Lou looked back over her shoulder, and ran.

— Patrick White, The Aunt's Story

Although the novel was shunned by the reading public upon its initial publication in 1948, White himself expressed a personal fondness for it: "It is the one I have most affection for," he wrote in 1959, "and I always find it irritating that only six Australians seem to have liked it."
