= Flaws in the Glass =

1981 autobiography by Patrick White

Flaws in the Glass: a self-portrait
- First edition
- Author: Patrick White
- Language: English
- Genre: Autobiographical
- Publisher: Jonathan Cape
- Publication date: 1981
- Publication place: Australia
- Media type: Print (hardback & paperback)
- Pages: 260 pp
- ISBN: 0-14-006293-9

Flaws in the Glass is Australian writer Patrick White's autobiography, published in 1981.

The first 150 pages are given over to an introspective "Self Portrait". Two sections, "Journeys" and "Episodes and Epitaphs" follow. The "Journeys" are a colourful description of White and Manoly's movement about the Greek mainland and its many islands. White also talks about that familiar love-hate relationship many people have with Greece (page 201):

"Greece is the greatest love-hate for anybody genuinely hooked ... If you are pure, innocent, or noble — qualities I don't lay claim to — perhaps you never develop passionate antipathies. But Greece is one long despairing rage in those who understand her ... Greece is mindless enough, unless when it comes to politics, and there confusion abounds."

White lists a number of exasperating aspects, incidents and images of Greece, "incidents and images such as these have helped temper my passion for Greece; they have forged a relationship without which my life would have been sterile indeed".

The final section illustrates White's prickly, socialist, republican, and poetic agenda. "My pursuit of that razor-blade truth has made me a slasher", White concludes, "Not that I don't love and venerate in several senses – before all, pureness of heart and trustfulness."
