= Happy Valley (novel) =

1939 novel by Patrick White

- First edition
- Author: Patrick White
- Language: English
- Publisher: George G. Harrap and Co. (UK); Viking Press (US)
- Publication date: 1939

Happy Valley is a 1939 novel by Australian writer Patrick White.

It won the 1941 Australian Literature Society Gold Medal.

White did not allow the novel to be republished in his lifetime. Not until 2012 would the book come back into print. White had dedicated the novel to artist Roy De Maistre.

== Background ==
The book owed much to White's experiences as a jackaroo working at Adaminaby in the Snowy Mountains of Southern New South Wales.

== Critical reception ==
A review in The Bulletin noted that although it is set in NSW "it might, with equal fidelity, have been a small town in Arkansas, or even Warwickshire if Squire were substituted for squatter and a vicar called in." The reviewer goes on to state the "story handles firmly in every way, the characters are fully imagined, events develop out of character and circumstance, there is not the slightest disposition to import false values."
