= The Living and the Dead (White novel) =

1941 novel by Patrick White

- First edition cover
- Author: Patrick White
- Language: English
- Publisher: Viking
- Publication date: June 1941
- Publication place: United States
- Media type: Print (Hardback & Paperback)
- Pages: 383 pp

The Living and the Dead is a novel by Australian Nobel Prize laureate Patrick White, his second published book (1941). It was written in the early stages of World War II whilst the author alternated between the United Kingdom and the United States.

The Living and the Dead is predominantly set in 1930s London. The Standishes—mother Catherine, son Elyot and daughter Eden—lead disparate lives under the one roof. The relationships between the three remain detached throughout the novel, each privately searching for purpose in a rapidly changing world. Their insignificance is overshadowed by the advance of war, deepening the portrayal of their inner bleakness.

As is typical of White's work, The Living and the Dead is more significant in its character penetration than the complexity of its plot.

== Plot summary ==
The Living and the Dead opens in London's Victoria Station. Elyot Standish bids farewell to his younger sister Eden in a manner that is not particularly emotional or final. Elyot returns to an empty house, somberly observing the memories that remain amongst its silent possessions.

Chapter 2 takes the reader several decades earlier, where a young Kitty Goose begins to find her way through England's upper classes. Catherine marries Willy Standish and bears him two children, but separates some years afterwards due to Willy's infidelity. Catherine's children, Elyot and Eden, are raised by her maid Julia and, during World War I, by surrogate guardians.

Following the war, Catherine, living on the dwindling remnants of pre-war affluence, struggles to relate to her children. Elyot, a Cambridge graduate and professional writer, isolates himself in intellectual pursuits. Eden, a bookshop attendant, is influenced by left-wing politics.

As the Spanish Civil War rises in the conscience of British society, the Standishes are forced to face their inner dissatisfactions. This is brought into focus by the failures of their sexual relationships. Catherine, who finds herself irrelevant in a much-changed world, pursues a romance with the younger Wally Collins, an American musician. The relationship is severed when Wally loses interest in Catherine, who spills her emotions whilst drunk at a fashionable party. Elyot, whether with family or with women, never allows himself a relationship of any depth. He distances himself from both Muriel Raphael, an artistic socialite, and Connie Tiarks, an unattractive but devoted childhood friend. The two are complete opposites, yet neither satisfies the purposeless Elyot.

It is Eden who suffers the most tragedy, yet, paradoxically, offers the best hope of a meaningful existence. Her first lover, a married man, discards her to pursue an overseas position. The secrecy surrounding her abortion isolates her further from her family. Her second romance with the leftist Joe Barnett gives her a long-sought happiness, but this is taken away in cruel circumstances. Joe, facing his own conscience, disappears to Spain and is killed in action. It is Joe Barnett's firm direction that all others fail to achieve.

With the death of Catherine to cancer, Eden decides that her rightful place is in Spain, even without her deceased lover. At the station, Elyot does not expect to ever see her again, and thus the reader understands the full significance of the opening chapter's sterility. The Living and the Dead raises deep questions about life, death and those in between.

== Literary significance & criticism ==
Patrick White won the Nobel Prize in Literature in 1973, however, The Living and the Dead is not usually included among his better-known works. 1001 Books You Must Read Before You Die lists two Patrick White novels: The Living and the Dead and Voss.

== Allusions to history, geography and science ==
Events of the early 20th century figure prominently in The Living and the Dead. Much of Catherine's development is shaped by World War I. The central plot revolves around the Spanish Civil War and the influences of the Great Depression and Communism. Numerous locations in London are described. The rise of American culture is noteworthy, particularly through the character of Wally Collins, a jazz band member.

== Release details ==
- 1941, United States, Viking Press, Publication date June 1941, Hardcover
- 1962, United Kingdom, Eyre & Spottiswoode ISBN 0-413-42780-3, Publication date December 1962, Hardcover
- 1968, United Kingdom, Penguin Books ISBN 0-14-002623-1, Publication date January 1968, Paperback
- 1992, United Kingdom, Penguin Books ISBN 0-14-018526-7, Publication date June 1992, Paperback
- 1996, United Kingdom, Vintage ISBN 0-09-932431-8, Publication date September 1996, Paperback
