= Patrick White =

Australian writer (1912–1990)

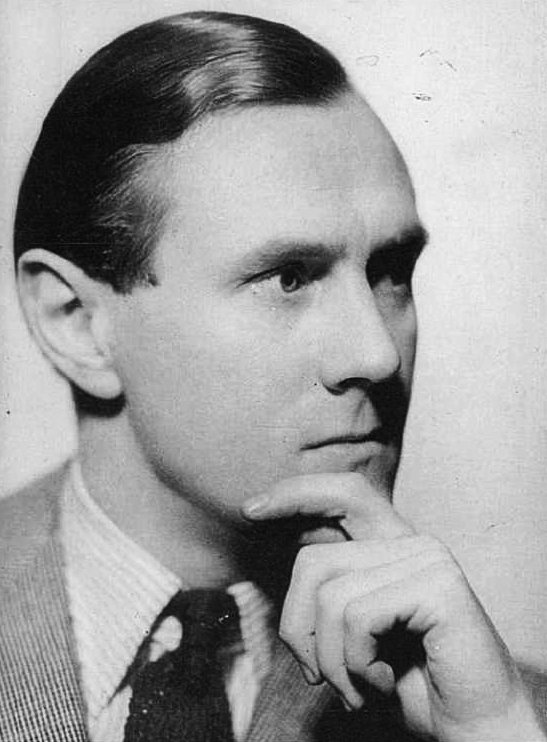
- White, c. 1940s
- Born: Patrick Victor Martindale White; 28 May 1912; Knightsbridge, London, England
- Died: 30 September 1990 (aged 78); Sydney, Australia
- Partner: Manoly Lascaris (1941–1990)
- Writing career
- Language: English
- Period: 1935–1987
- Notable works: The Tree of Man (1955); Voss (1957); The Eye of the Storm (1973); The Twyborn Affair (1979)
- Notable awards: Miles Franklin Award (1957, 1961); ALS Gold Medal (1941, 1955, 1965); Australian of the Year (1973); Nobel Prize in Literature (1973)

Patrick Victor Martindale White (28 May 1912 – 30 September 1990) was an Australian novelist and playwright who explored themes of religious experience, personal identity and the conflict between visionary individuals and a materialistic, conformist society. Influenced by the modernism of James Joyce, D. H. Lawrence and Virginia Woolf, he developed a complex literary style and a body of work that challenged the dominant realist prose tradition of his home country, was satirical of Australian society, and sharply divided local critics. He was awarded the Nobel Prize in Literature in 1973 and is the only Australian to receive it. (Note: J. M. Coetzee won the award in 2003 as a South African citizen, before he became an Australian citizen in 2006.)

Born in London to affluent Australian parents, White spent his childhood in Sydney and on his family's rural properties. He was sent to an English public school at the age of 13, and went on to read modern languages at Cambridge. After graduating in 1935 he embarked on a literary career. His first published novel, Happy Valley (1939), was awarded the Gold Medal of the Australian Literature Society. In World War II he served as an intelligence officer in the Royal Air Force. While stationed in Alexandria, Egypt, in 1941, he met Manoly Lascaris, who became his life companion and, as White later wrote, "the central mandala in my life's hitherto messy design."

In 1948 White returned to Australia, where he bought a small farm on the outskirts of Sydney. There he wrote the two novels, The Tree of Man (1955) and Voss (1957), that brought him critical acclaim in the United States and the United Kingdom. In the 1960s he wrote the novels Riders in the Chariot (1961) and The Solid Mandala (1966), and a series of plays, including The Season at Sarsaparilla and A Cheery Soul, that had a major impact on Australian theatre.

White and Lascaris moved to Sydney's Centennial Park in 1964. From the late 1960s White became increasingly involved in public affairs, opposing the Vietnam War and supporting Aboriginal self-determination, nuclear disarmament and environmental causes. His later work includes the novels The Eye of the Storm (1973) and The Twyborn Affair (1979) and the memoir Flaws in the Glass (1981).

== Childhood and adolescence ==
White was born in Knightsbridge, London, on 28 May 1912. His Australian parents, Victor Martindale White, a wealthy sheep grazier, and Ruth (née Withycombe) were in England on an extended honeymoon. The family returned to Sydney, Australia, when he was six months old. As a child he lived in a flat with his sister, a nanny, and a maid while his parents lived in an adjoining flat. In 1916 they moved to a large house, "Lulworth", in Elizabeth Bay. At the age of four White developed asthma, a condition that had taken the life of his maternal grandfather, and his health was fragile throughout his childhood.

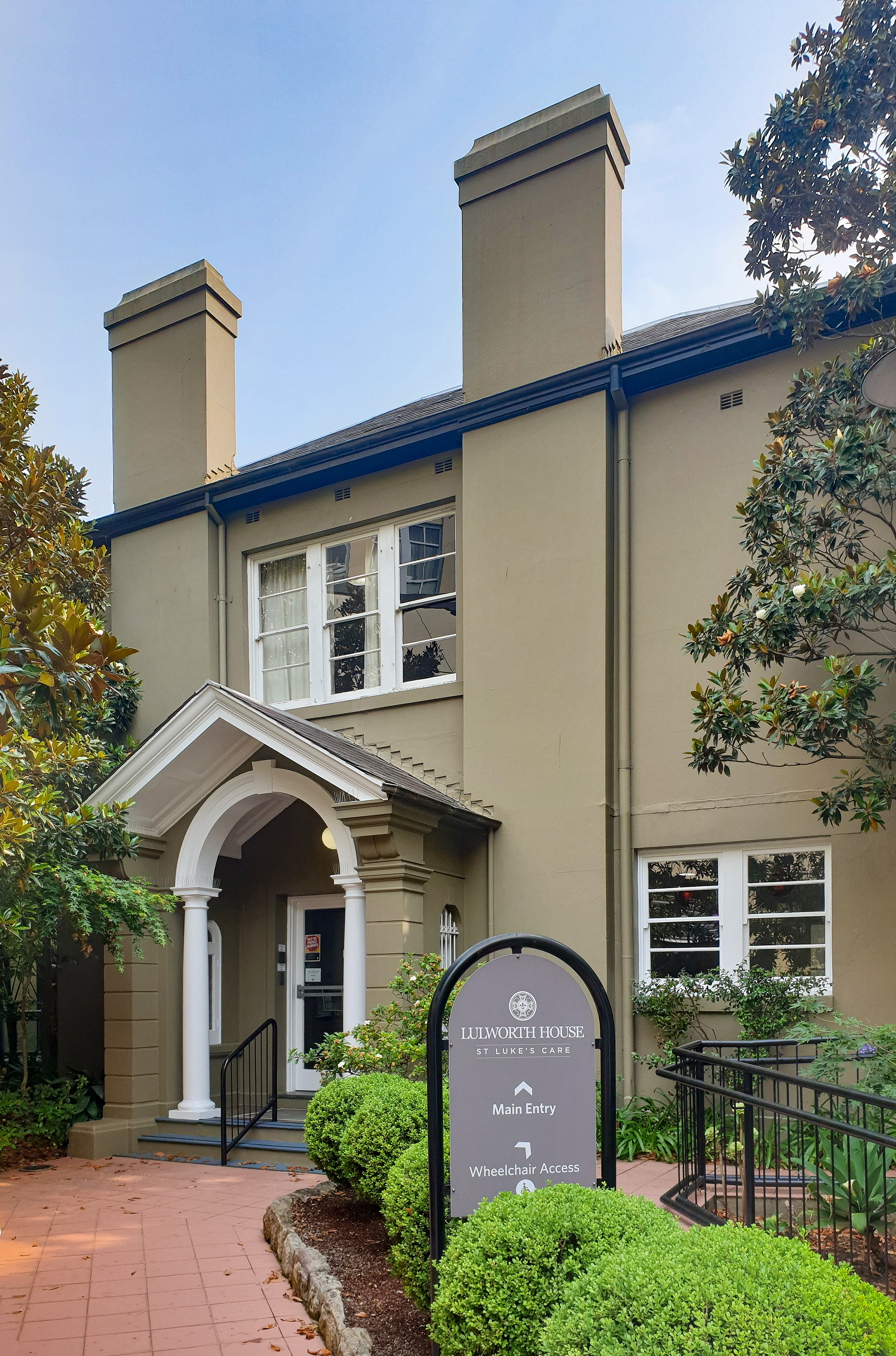
Lulworth, White's childhood home in Elizabeth Bay, Sydney

At the age of five he attended kindergarten at Sandtoft in Woollahra, close to their home. His mother often took him to plays and pantomimes and White developed a life long love of the theatre. Nevertheless, White felt closer to his nurse, Lizzie Clark, who taught him to tell the truth and "not blow his own trumpet".

In 1920 he attended Cranbrook School but his asthma worsened. Two years later he was sent to Tudor House School, a boarding school in the Southern Highlands of New South Wales, where it was thought the climate would help his lungs. White enjoyed the freedom provided by the school where discipline was lax. He read widely from the school library, wrote a play and excelled at English. In 1924 the boarding school ran into financial trouble, and the headmaster suggested that White be sent to a public school in England.

In April 1925 his parents took White to England to enrol in Cheltenham College in Gloucestershire. In his first years at Cheltenham he was withdrawn and had few friends. He found his housemaster to be sadistic and puritanical, and White's certitude of his own homosexuality increased his sense of isolation. He later wrote of Cheltenham, "When the gates of my expensive prison closed I lost confidence in my mother, and [I] never forgave."

One of White's few pleasures was the time spent at the Somerset home of his cousin, the painter Jack Withycombe. Jack's daughter Elizabeth Withycombe became a mentor to him while he was completing his first, privately published, volume of verse, Thirteen Poems, written between 1927 and 1929. White also became friends with Ronald Waterall who was two years his senior at Cheltenham and shared his passion for the theatre. He and White would spend their holidays in London seeing as many shows as they could.

White asked his parents if he could leave school to become an actor. His parents compromised and allowed him to leave school without taking his final examinations if he came home to Australia to try life on the land. But their son had already changed his mind on his future profession and was determined to become a writer.

In December 1929 White left Cheltenham and sailed to Sydney. He spent two years working as a jackaroo on sheep stations at Bolaro in the Monaro district of New South Wales and at Barwon Vale in northern New South Wales. The landscapes impressed White and he wrote two unpublished novels during this time: "The Immigrants" and "Sullen Moon".

White's uncle, who owned Barwon Vale, convinced White's parents that their son was not suited to the life of a grazier. White's mother was happy for him to become a writer but she wanted him to have a career as a diplomat as well. On this basis his parents agreed to send him to Cambridge. While studying for the entrance examinations, White completed a third unpublished novel, "Finding Heaven".

== Europe, America and war ==
From 1932 White lived in England, studying French and German literature at King's College, Cambridge. There he began a love affair with a fellow student that lasted until White graduated. White wrote poems, some of which were published in the London Mercury. He spent his holidays in France and Germany to improve his languages and read Joyce, Lawrence, Proust, Flaubert, Stendhal and Thomas Mann with admiration. He made a pilgrimage to Zennor in Cornwall where Lawrence wrote Women in Love and the visit inspired further poems. A collection was published as The Ploughman and Other Poems in an edition of 300 in Sydney in 1935 but received little critical attention and was later suppressed by White. A play, Bread and Butter Women, was given an amateur production in Sydney the same year.

On White's graduation in 1935 his mother wanted him to embark on a diplomatic career but he was determined to stay in England and become a writer. His mother relented and his father granted him an allowance of £400 a year. He moved to London's Pimlico district where, in 1936, he met the Australian painter Roy de Maistre. De Maistre briefly became White's lover and remained a mentor and friend. White later said that de Maistre had encouraged him to break from naturalistic prose and write "from the inside out."

White began work on the novel Happy Valley, partly based on his experience working as a jackaroo. In 1937 his story "The Twitching Colonel" was published in the London Mercury. His father died in December, leaving him a legacy of £10,000 that enabled him to write full-time in relative comfort. He started work on a play, Return to Abyssinia, and wrote skits for revues which were produced with moderate success. He completed Happy Valley and the novel was accepted by the British publisher George G. Harrap and Company in 1938.

Happy Valley was published in early 1939 to generally favourable reviews which encouraged White to go to America to find a publisher there. White arrived in New York in April and travelled across the country. He visited Taos, New Mexico, where he viewed Lawrence's ashes and met Frieda Lawrence. He then moved to Cape Cod where he worked on a novel, The Living and the Dead, partly based on his life in London. When the Second World War broke out in September, White took the first available ship back to England where he continued to work on his new novel.

In early 1940 White heard that Ben Huebsch, the head of the American publisher Viking, had accepted Happy Valley. Huebsch had published Lawrence and Joyce in America and White was delighted with the connection to these writers. Huebsch was to become one of White's main literary supporters. White decided to travel back to New York for the publication of Happy Valley and to complete the new novel. Happy Valley was published in June to favourable reviews. Huebsch also accepted the now completed novel The Living and the Dead for publication.

White returned to London where, in November, he was called up to an intelligence unit of the Royal Air Force. He was stationed at Bentley Priory during the Blitz before being transferred to North Africa in April 1941. He subsequently served in Egypt, Palestine and Greece. While stationed near Alexandria in July 1941 he met Manoly Lascaris, who was waiting to be recruited to the Royal Greek Army. Lascaris was to become White's life partner.

Following the war White was determined to leave England to avoid "the prospect of ceasing to be an artist and turning instead into that most sterile of beings, a London intellectual." White's preference was to live in Greece but Lascaris wanted to start a new life in Australia. White relented because, "It was his illusion. I suppose I sensed it was better than mine."

Before leaving for Australia White began work on a novel The Aunt's Story, inspired by a painting by Roy de Maistre. He sent the completed typescript to his American publisher in January 1947. In March, his play Return to Abyssinia opened in London to polite reviews. White missed its short season because he was in Australia making preparations for his permanent return. He returned to London and began a new play, The Ham Funeral, inspired by the William Dobell painting "The Dead Landlord".

White sailed back to Australia in December 1947. During his voyage The Aunt's Story was published in the United States to very favourable reviews and strong sales. Critic James Stern's review in the New York Times Book Review was enthusiastic and Stern would go on to be one of White's major champions in America.

== Return to Australia ==
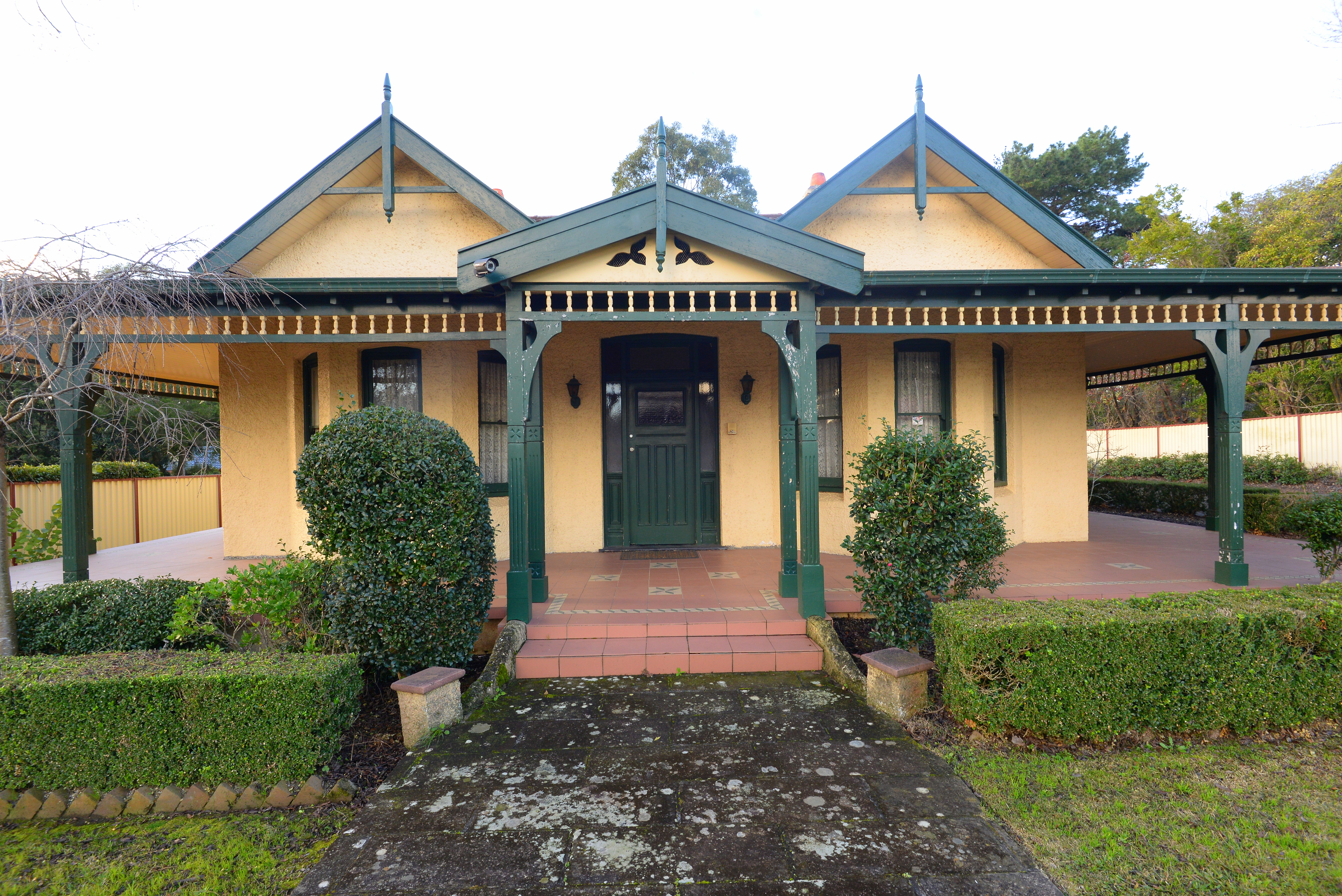
White's house in Castle Hill, Sydney

White arrived back in Australia in February 1948. He and Lascaris moved to a small farm purchased by White at Castle Hill, now a Sydney suburb but then semi-rural. He named the house "Dogwoods", after trees he planted there. He and Lascaris worked the farm and sold flowers, vegetables, milk and cream as well as pedigree schnauzer puppies.

The reviews of The Aunt's Story in the British and Australian press were less enthusiastic than those in America, and White was unable to interest theatres in Australia or overseas in producing The Ham Funeral. He was making slow progress on the novel which was to become The Tree of Man and was discouraged at his prospects of success as a writer. He also questioned his decision to return to Australia.

In late 1951 White had a religious experience that gave him a belief in God and the inspiration to recommence work on The Tree of Man (published in 1955). He described the novel as an attempt to suggest "every possible aspect of life, through the lives of an ordinary man and woman." The Tree of Man and his following work Voss (1957) established White's favourable critical reputation in Britain and America. White, however, was embittered by what he considered a hostile critical response in Australia.

Following his international success White continued to live and work on his farm in Castle Hill. He gave few interviews and usually declined requests for public appearances, promotion of his work, and invitations for his membership of literary and cultural organisations. He entertained a close circle of friends at his home but always felt himself to be an outsider: "first as a child with what kind of strange gift no one quite knew; then a despised colonial in an English public school; finally an artist in horrified Australia."

In 1961 his novel Riders in the Chariot was published, and was his first to receive almost universal critical praise in Australia. Meanwhile, White's interest had returned to the theatre. The Drama Committee of the Adelaide Festival had recommended The Ham Funeral as the festival's main theatrical production for 1962. The festival governors, however, rejected the play citing concerns about "a piece of work which quite fails to reconcile poetry with social realism" and a scene involving an aborted foetus in a dustbin. The controversy led to a successful amateur production of the play in Adelaide followed by a professional production in Sydney. White was inspired to write three further plays which were given professional productions: The Season at Sarsaparilla (1962), A Cheery Soul (1963) and Night on Bald Mountain (1964).

In 1963 White's mother died in London and his share of the estate allowed him to buy a house in Centennial Park, near the centre of Sydney, the following year. Before leaving Dogwoods, White had bought up every copy of his early published poems he could find and burnt them along with most of his manuscripts, papers, letters and journals.

White was working on The Solid Mandala, a novel about twins, Waldo and Arthur Brown, who represent contrary aspects of his own character. He was becoming interested in Tarot, astrology, the I Ching and Jungian psychology, and these interests are reflected in the novel. Following its publication in 1966, White declined the Britannica Award for Literature and Miles Franklin Award for the novel and stated he no longer wanted his works considered for awards.

White had long had an interest in art and music, describing himself as "something of a frustrated painter, and a composer manqué." The core of his art collection was works by his friends Sidney Nolan and de Maistre but he collected works by emerging Australian artists such as James Clifford, Erica McGilchrist, and Lawrence Daws and some established artists like Brett Whiteley. In early 1967 he began work on The Vivisector, a novel about a painter, Hurtle Duffield, who exploits human relationships for his art. After the novel was published in 1970, Nolan believed Duffield was based on him, but White denied this, stating that Duffield was a composite of his own character and the working life of the artists John Passmore and Godfrey Miller.

White was becoming more politically engaged at this time. He was opposed to Australia's involvement in the Vietnam war, and in December 1969 he participated in his first political demonstration, breaking the law by publicly inciting young men not to register for military conscription. The following year he campaigned against censorship and gave evidence in favour of the publication of Philip Roth's novel Portnoy's Complaint at obscenity trials in Melbourne and Sydney. In 1972 the New South Wales government announced a plan to build an Olympic stadium near Centennial Park. White participated in the anti-development protests, giving speeches at a rally in June.

White had been on the shortlist for the Nobel Prize in Literature since 1969. In 1971, after the prize was awarded to Pablo Neruda, he wrote to a friend: "That Nobel Prize! I hope I never hear it mentioned again. I certainly don't want it; the machinery behind it seems a bit dirty, when we thought that only applied to Australian awards. In my case to win the prize would upset my life far too much, and it would embarrass me to be held up to the world as an Australian writer when, apart from the accident of blood, I feel I am temperamentally a cosmopolitan Londoner".

== Nobel laureate ==
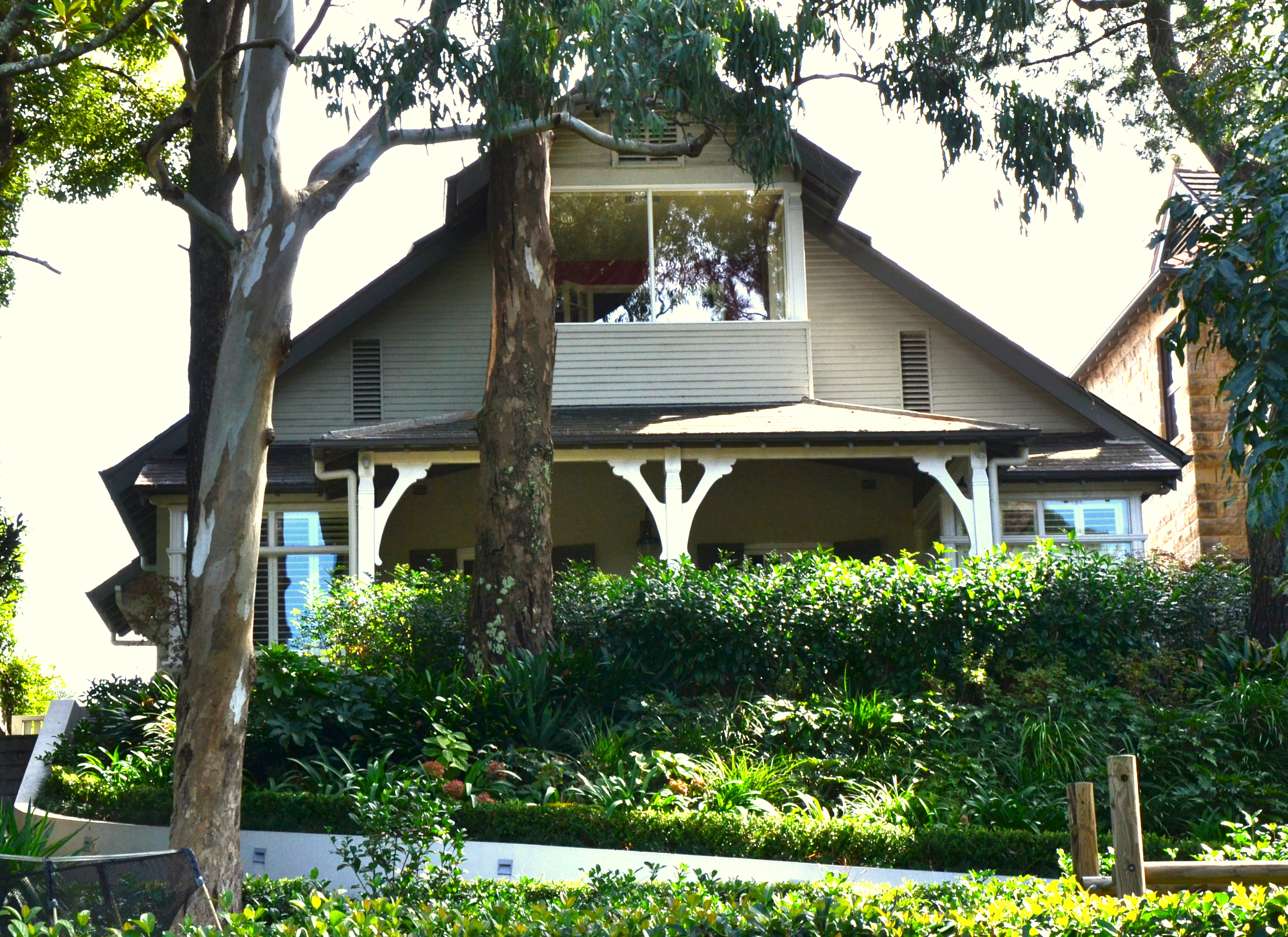
Patrick White's home Highbury, in Centennial Park, Sydney

In 1970 White had begun working on a new novel, The Eye of the Storm, about the meaning of his mother's death. He sent the completed work to his British publishers in December 1972. He delayed sending it to his American publishers, Viking, because The Vivisector had sold poorly in America and he hoped positive reviews of the new work in Britain would increase interest in the United States.

The novel was published in August 1973 and White was awarded the Nobel Prize in Literature in October. The Nobel citation praised him "for an epic and psychological narrative art, which has introduced a new continent into literature". White, pleading delicate health, declined to travel to Sweden to accept the award. Nolan attended the ceremony on his behalf.

The Nobel prize increased worldwide interest in White's work. Eye of the Storm was widely reviewed in the United States and sold 25,000 copies by March 1974. New editions of his previous novels were published and translation rights sold well. White, however, refused to have Happy Valley republished as he considered it an inferior early work and he was afraid that some of the people on whom characters were based might sue for defamation.

According to David Marr, White's biographer, "From the time of the prize his work became saturated with a late, relaxed sensuality." White himself was less relaxed about the effects of the award, telling a supporter: "the Nobel Prize is a terrifying and destructive experience."

White was made Australian of the Year for 1973. In his acceptance speech, he said that Australia Day should be "a day of self-searching rather than trumpet blowing" and that historian Manning Clark, comedian Barry Humphries and communist trade union leader Jack Mundey were more worthy of the award.

In May 1974 White gave a speech in support of the re-election of the Whitlam Labor government, stating that it was necessary for Australia to create: "an intellectual climate from which artists would no longer feel the need to flee." Following a trip to Fraser Island to do research for a new novel A Fringe of Leaves, he became a supporter of the campaign to stop sand mining on the island. He wrote to the re-elected prime minister Gough Whitlam on the issue and the campaign eventually forced the government to suspend its approval of mining and hold an inquiry on the matter.

White was among the first group of the Companions of the Order of Australia in 1975 but resigned in June 1976 in protest against the dismissal of the Whitlam government in November 1975 by the Governor-General Sir John Kerr and the subsequent reintroduction of knighthoods as part of the order. White later wrote that Kerr's behaviour "moved me farther to the Left and made me a convinced Republican." Over the following years, he would break with numerous long-term friends because he thought they supported the conservative establishment or had compromised their personal or artistic integrity.

In November 1975 the young theatre director Jim Sharman approached White to discuss a revival of The Season at Sarsaparilla. They also agreed to film his story "The Night the Prowler" and White began working on a script. The meeting sparked a revival in White's interest in theatre and a long-term working relationship between the two men.

In 1976 White was working on a new novel, The Twyborn Affair, partly based on aspects of his own life and that of male Antarctic explorer Herbert Dyce-Murphy (1879–1971) who had lived as a woman for several years. In researching his novel, White revisited the regions of New South Wales where White had lived and worked as a youth, and significant locations in London, France and Greece. In October, A Fringe of Leaves was published to generally favourable reviews and sold well. Sharman's production of A Season at Sarsaparilla in Sydney was also a critical success and attracted good audiences.

In 1977 a project to film Voss with Joseph Losey as director collapsed when the promoter Harry M. Miller failed to gain finance. Miller eventually sold the film rights to Nolan. The success of The Season at Sarsaparilla had inspired White to write his first play in over 12 years, Big Toys, about plutocracy and corruption in Sydney. The play, directed by Sharman, premiered in Sydney in October but attracted generally unfavourable reviews and moderate audiences.

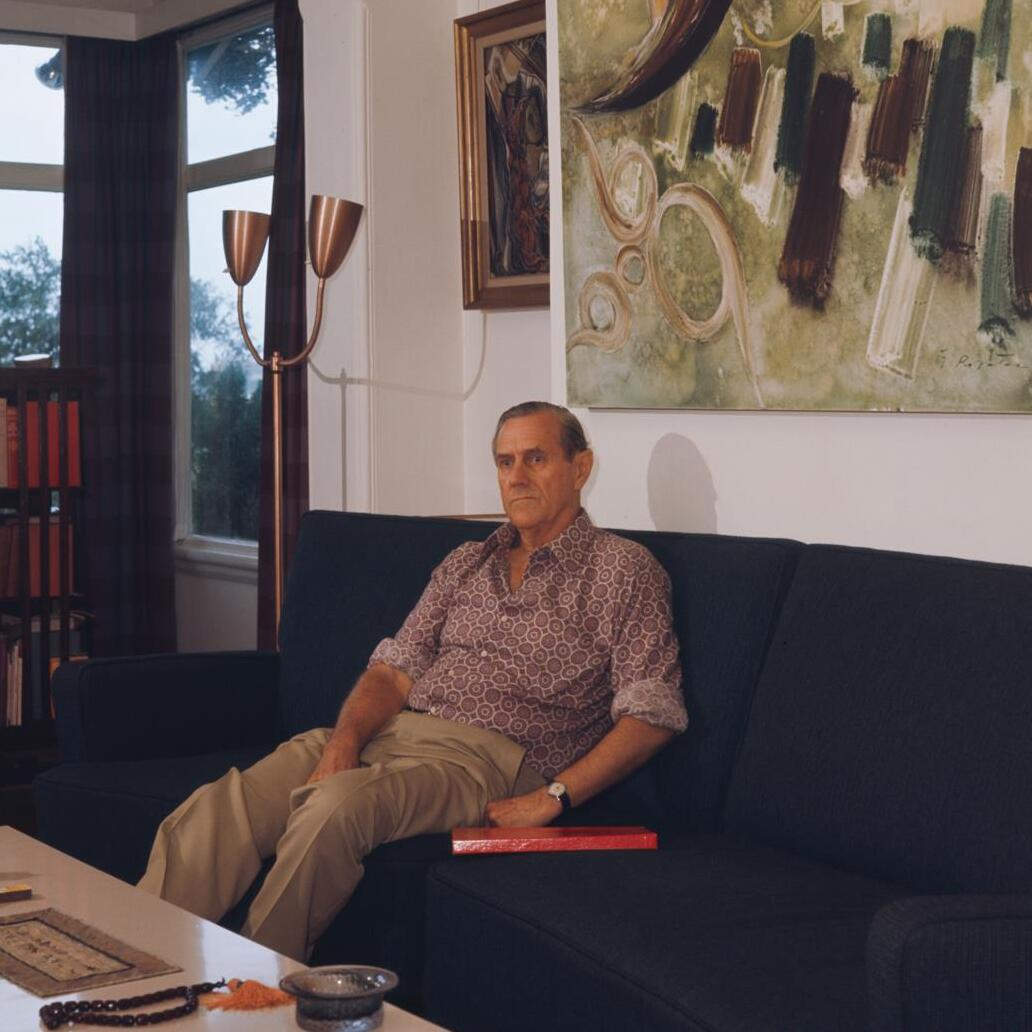
White in 1972

The film of The Night the Prowler, directed by Sharman, premiered at the Sydney Film Festival in June 1978. Reviews were generally unfavourable and the film failed at the box office. Sharman's 1979 production of A Cheery Soul for the Sydney Theatre Company broke box office records for the drama theatre of the Opera House despite mixed reviews. The Twyborn Affair was published in Britain in November 1979 to very positive reviews and became a best seller. The response from critics and the public in the United States was more subdued.

In October 1979 White started work on a memoir, Flaws in the Glass, in which he planned to write publicly for the first time about his homosexuality and his relationship with Manoly Lascaris. The book was published in Britain in October 1981 to great publicity and became his biggest seller in his life time. Much of the publicity stemmed from his scathing character portraits of Nolan, Kerr and Joan Sutherland. Nolan considered suing White for defamation and their friendship ended.

The 1982 Adelaide Festival was directed by Sharman who had commissioned a new play by White, Signal Driver. The festival also featured a short excerpt from an opera based on Voss. The opera had been commissioned by Opera Australia with Richard Meale as composer and David Malouf the librettist. Critics were generally lukewarm towards Signal Driver, but encouraging towards the fragment of Voss. White, in contrast, disliked Meale's approach to Voss but was enthusiastic about the production of Signal Driver. White was encouraged to write a new play for Sharman, Netherwood, "about the sanity in insanity and the insanity in sanity". The play premiered in Adelaide in May 1983 but attracted hostile reviews which White considered a deliberate media campaign to sabotage his work.

By 1984 White had become disillusioned with the Hawke Labor government and publicly and financially supported the new Nuclear Disarmament Party. White had been publicly campaigning for nuclear disarmament since 1981, calling it: "the most important moral issue in history."

=== Late work and declining health ===
In late 1984 White was hospitalised due to osteoporosis, crumbled vertebrae and glaucoma resulting from his long-term use of cortisone to treat his asthma and chest infections. Although he was still mentally agile, his physical health and mobility were declining.

He had recovered sufficiently by January 1985 to recommence work on a new novel, Memoirs of Many in One, which he described as a "religious" and "bawdy" novel about senility. Posing as the editor of the memoirs of Alex Xenophon Demirjian Gray, White felt free to explore various aspects of his own character. The novel was published in Britain on 1 April 1986 and sharply divided critics.

Salman Rushdie wrote to White in 1985, praising the novel Voss: "I cannot think when last a book so moved me." By this time, however, White was tired of praise for the novel as he rated several of his other works more highly. The completed opera Voss opened at the Adelaide Festival in March 1986 to general critical acclaim. White, however, boycotted the premiere because the festival had invited the Queen to attend. He attended the Sydney premiere later that year and judged it: "a stupendous occasion."

In April 1987 White's new play, Shepherd on the Rocks, opened at Adelaide in a production directed by Neil Armfield. White attended and deemed it a success. He had also written three short prose poems which were published as Three Uneasy Pieces in late 1987. White was determined that none of his works would be published or performed in 1988 which was the bicentenary of British settlement in Australia. He also urged a boycott of all official celebrations of the event, stating: "circuses don't solve serious problems."

White was hospitalised with pneumonia in August 1988. A nurse stayed at his home for the remainder of his life and he no longer had the strength to attend protest rallies. In June 1989, a selection of his public statements, speeches and interviews was published as Patrick White Speaks. In October, the Sydney Theatre Company staged a successful revival of The Ham Funeral directed by Neil Armfield. White attended the premiere in his last public appearance.

In July 1990 White contracted pleurisy and suffered a bronchial collapse. He refused to be hospitalised and died at home at dawn on 30 September.

== Religious and political views ==
=== Religion ===
White was raised an Anglican but stated, "I… went through my youth believing in nothing but my own ego." In late 1951 he experienced a religious conversion:

If I say I had no religious tendencies between adolescence and The Tree of Man, it's because I was sufficiently vain and egotistical to feel one can ignore certain realities. (I think the turning point came during a season of unending rain at Castle Hill when I fell flat on my back one day in the mud and starting cursing a God I had convinced myself didn't exist. My personal scheme of things until then at once seemed too foolish to continue holding.)

As the 1950s progressed White became disillusioned with the Anglican church and his religious beliefs became more eclectic. He once described himself as a "lapsed Anglican egotist agnostic pantheist occultist existentialist would-be though failed Christian Australian." White stated in 1981 that he did not call himself a Christian because he could not follow Christ's injunction to forgive. In 1969, however, he had affirmed the importance of religion in his work: "Religion. Yes, that's behind all my books. What I am interested in is the relationship between the blundering human being and God."

=== Politics ===
In the 1930s White was not politically engaged, but was sympathetic to the Francoist cause in the Spanish Civil War and supported Britain's policy of appeasing Hitler. He later expressed regret over his complacency regarding European fascism. On his return to Australia after the Second World War he had little interest in politics but routinely voted for the conservative coalition in elections. He became involved in politics in 1969 when he joined protests against the Vietnam war and conscription of Australian troops for the conflict. He also supported the trade union Green Bans against development proposals which threatened the urban environment. He publicly supported the Australian Labor Party in the federal elections of 1972, 1974 and 1975 despite a falling out with the prime minister Gough Whitlam over sand mining on Fraser Island.

Following the dismissal of the Whitlam government in November 1975, he became a prominent advocate for an Australian republic. He was a public supporter of Aboriginal self-determination and privately donated money towards Aboriginal education. From 1981 he became a leading public figure in campaigns for nuclear disarmament and continued his support for various environmental causes. Marr states that a common thread running through his political interventions was his opposition to plutocracy. Academic Martin Thomas argues that White was acutely aware of his own privileged upbringing and this drove his later concern about social injustice.

== Critical reception ==
White's first published novel, Happy Valley (1939), received favourable reviews in Britain and Australia, although some critics noted that it was too derivative of Joyce, Lawrence and Woolf. The novel was awarded the Gold Medal of the Australian Literature Society. The Living and the Dead (1941) and The Aunt's Story (1948) attracted little critical attention in Australia, although the latter was favourably reviewed in the New York Times Review of Books.

The Tree of Man (1955) was White's first major international success, attracting positive reviews in the United States and the United Kingdom. James Stern, writing in the New York Times Book Review, praised the novel as "a timeless work of art." Australian reviewers were more divided, poet A. D. Hope calling White's prose "pretentious and illiterate verbal sludge." The novel sold eight thousand copies in Australia in the first three months and was awarded the Gold Medal of the Australian Literature Society.

Voss (1957) was reviewed favourably in the United Kingdom but critics in the United States and Australia were more ambivalent. A significant body of Australian critics continued to fault White's prose style and some objected to his rejection of the realist prose tradition. The novel was a best seller in the United Kingdom and won the inaugural Australian Miles Franklin Award. Riders in the Chariot (1961) also achieved critical and commercial success in the United Kingdom, and won admiring reviews in Australia.

By 1963 White was widely accepted as the major Australian literary novelist. A. D. Hope called him "unquestionably the best known and most discussed novelist of the day" and thought his success was "indicative of a break with the naturalistic tradition which has dominated Australian fiction since the turn of the century, and may well be a portent of a more imaginative and a more intellectual sort of fiction." White was awarded the Nobel Prize in Literature in 1973. Academic Elizabeth Webby states that many critics consider The Twyborn Affair the best of his subsequent work.

Katherine Brisbane states that the reception of White's plays has been ambivalent as they mix realism, expressionism and poetic and vernacular dialogue in a way which has challenged audiences and directors. The Ham Funeral (1947) was successfully produced in 1962 after it was rejected by the Adelaide Festival for obscenity. It was successfully revived in 1989. The Season at Sarsaparilla (1962) has been his most produced play.

== Themes and style ==
=== Themes ===
According to critic Brian Kiernan, "the basic situation in his [White's] fiction is the attempt of individuals, most often individuals alienated from society, to grasp some higher, more essential reality that lies beyond or behind social existence." The search for a higher reality is most often presented as an exploration of various forms of religious or mystical experience and the "seers" are variously pioneer-settlers (The Tree of Man), explorers (Voss), artists (The Vivisector), the simple-minded (The Solid Mandala), those fleeing into the self (The Aunt's Story) or those on the margins of society. Sexual ambivalence and the search for personal identity are also recurrent themes that become more prominent in the later novels.

Society, in particular Australian society, is mostly portrayed as materialistic, conformist and life-inhibiting. White satirises what he called in 1958, "The Great Australian Emptiness"

in which the mind is the least of possessions, in which the rich man is the important man, in which the schoolmaster and the journalist rule what intellectual roost there is, in which beautiful youths and girls stare at life through blind blue eyes, in which human teeth fall like autumn leaves, the buttocks of cars grow hourly glassier, food means cake and steak, muscles prevail, and the march of material ugliness does not raise a quiver from the average nerves."

The academic Mark Williams argues that White places the religious impulse at the centre of the human condition and his work, adding that "religion is one of the central values, along with art and love, which he considers to be denigrated in his homeland." Kiernan notes a division among critics over whether "he is essentially a simple and traditional writer who affirms a religious, even mystical view of life, or one who is distinctively modern, sophisticated and ironic, continually exploring transcendent possibilities but with detachment and even scepticism." Greg Clarke argues that Christian discourse is central to White's writing. Marr, Williams and Kiernan, however, state that White drew on various religious and mystical traditions in his work including Judaism, Jungian archetypes and gnosticism.

=== Style ===
White's early novels were heavily influenced by the modernism of Eliot, Joyce, Lawrence and Woolf. Kiernan has called his mature work "complex, ambiguous and ironic verbal structures". His narratives shift seamlessly between past and present, inner experience and outer awareness, and the point of view of different characters. According to Williams, "the point of view of the narrative in any White novel changes continually, rapidly and disconcertingly. The narrative voice ... is a voice composed of many voices, a slippery, complex, fluent medium."

White frequently shifts between tones, styles and linguistic registers. According to Kiernan, "A self-conscious play with conventions, a parodic playfulness, is apparent through White's adoption of various modes in his work from the first." His transitions between realist, expressionist, symbolist and romantic modes were a conscious attempt to demonstrate that "the Australian novel is not necessarily the dreary, dun-coloured offspring of journalistic realism." Kiernan states that in Voss the theme of the outsider as visionary explorer of the human condition is undercut by ironic comedy and parodies of the "gothic excess" of romantic literature. Williams argues that White's tendency for parody and playfulness become more prominent in later works such as The Twyborn Affair and Memoirs of Many in One. The tone becomes less portentous and more relaxed, and the works more self-referential.

== Influence and legacy ==
Critic Susan Lever considers White a pivotal figure in Australian literature, stating that he made the novel, rather than poetry, the pre-eminent literary form. He "transformed the possibilities of the Australian novel by demonstrating that it was a place to test ideas against complex spiritual, psychological and emotional experience, not only an avenue for national storytelling."

Australian novelists influenced by White include Thomas Keneally, Thea Astley, Randolph Stow and Christopher Koch. Lever argues that the following generations of novelists were more influenced by recent trends in world literature. Novelist David Malouf states that White's "High Modernism" is a literary form that has become unfashionable but that this could change. In 2018, novelist Christos Tsiolkas argued that White was an important figure in Australian literature who hadn't received enough attention in recent decades. Writing in 2024, critic Martin Thomas noted that critical and public interest in White had declined.

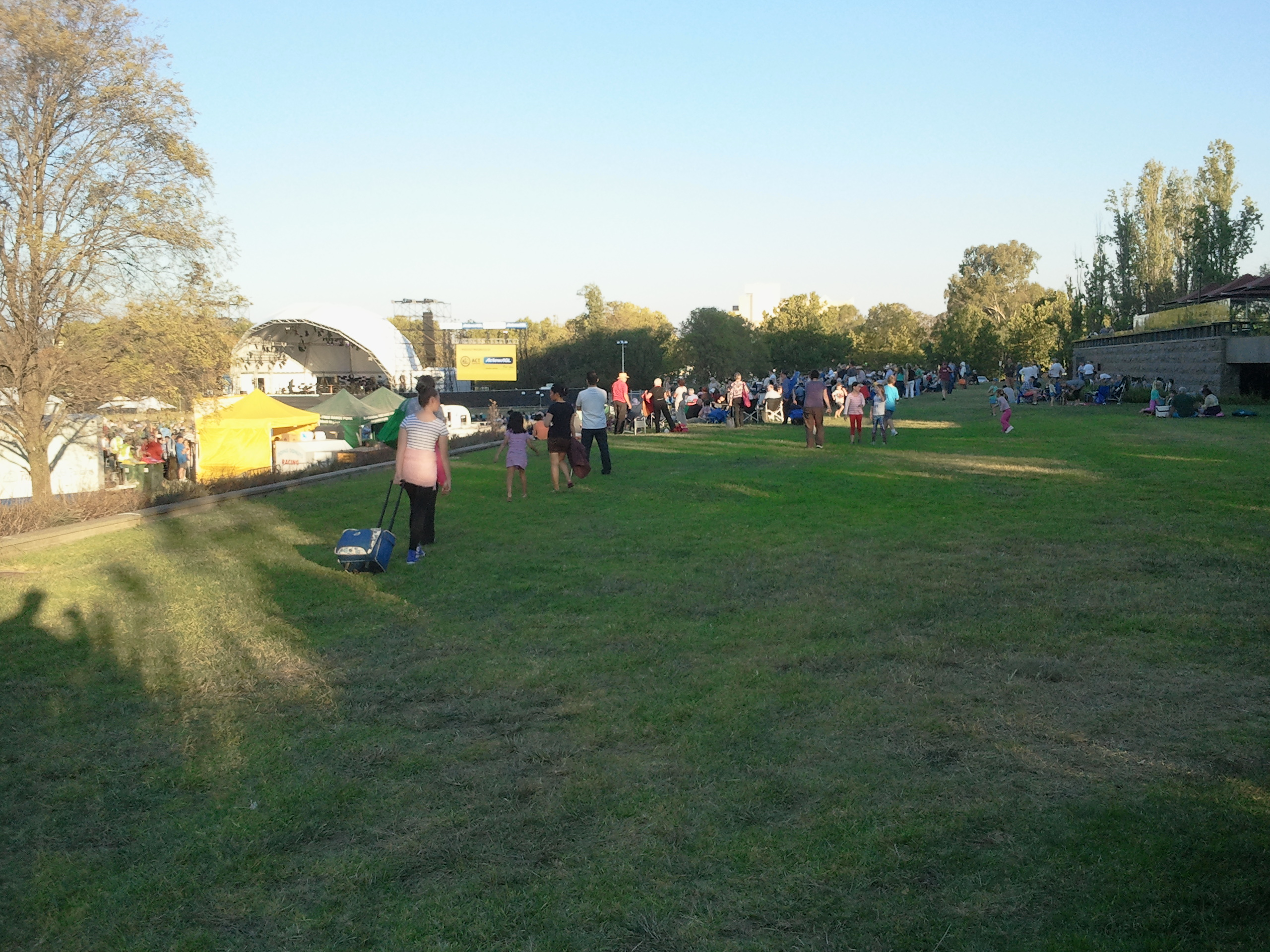
The Patrick White Lawns with temporary stage, March 2015.

The Patrick White Award is an annual literary prize which White founded in 1975 with the prize money from his Nobel prize. It is awarded to writers who have made a significant contribution to Australian literature. The Patrick White Indigenous Writers Award is for Indigenous students in New South Wales from Kindergarten to year 12. It is run by the Aboriginal Education Council which was a beneficiary of Patrick White's estate. The Sydney Theatre Company sponsors the Patrick White Playwrights Award and Fellowship in honour of White's contribution to Australian theatre.

In 2006 the National Library of Australia acquired a large quantity of White's manuscripts. These included an unfinished novel, The Hanging Garden, which was published in 2012. The Art Gallery of New South Wales owns a 1940 portrait of White by de Maistre, and Parliament House, Sydney, owns a 1980 portrait by Brett Whiteley. A portrait of White by Louis Kahan won the 1962 Archibald Prize. White donated much of his own collection of Australian art to the Art Gallery of New South Wales.

As of 2024 there is no museum or institution dedicated to White's life and work. His former residence, "Dogwoods", at Castle Hill is privately owned but has a commemorative plaque and the surrounding streets are named after him. His former Sydney residence at Centennial Park is privately owned but is heritage listed. White is commemorated by the Patrick White Lawns adjacent to the National Library of Australia in Canberra.

In 2006 a hoaxer submitted a chapter of White's novel The Eye of the Storm to a dozen Australian publishers under the name Wraith Picket (an anagram of White's name). All of the publishers rejected the manuscript and none recognised it as White's work.

In 2010 White's novel The Vivisector was shortlisted for the Lost Man Booker Prize for 1970. In 2011 Fred Schepisi's film adaptation of the novel The Eye of the Storm won The Age Critics Award for the best Australian feature at the Melbourne International Film Festival.

In the Australian Broadcasting Corporation's Radio National Top 100 Australian Books (2026), Voss was ranked number 67 and The Tree of Man came in at number 71.

== List of works ==
Novels

- Happy Valley (1939)
- The Living and the Dead (1941)
- The Aunt's Story (1948)
- The Tree of Man (1955)
- Voss (1957)
- Riders in the Chariot (1961)
- The Solid Mandala (1966)
- The Vivisector (1970)
- The Eye of the Storm (1973)
- A Fringe of Leaves (1976)
- The Twyborn Affair (1979)
- Memoirs of Many in One (1986)
- The Hanging Garden (2012) (Unfinished, posthumous)

Collections of short stories

- The Burnt Ones (1964)
- The Cockatoos (1974)
- Three Uneasy Pieces (1987)

Poetry

- Thirteen Poems, under the pseudonym Patrick Victor Martindale (Sydney: Privately printed, c. 1929)
- The Ploughman and Other Poems (Sydney: Beacon Press, 1935)

Plays

- Bread and Butter Women (1935) Unpublished.
- The School for Friends (1935) Unpublished.
- Return to Abyssinia (1948) Unpublished.
- The Ham Funeral (1947) prem. Union Theatre, Adelaide, 1961.
- The Season at Sarsaparilla (1962)
- A Cheery Soul (1963)
- Night on Bald Mountain (1964)
- Big Toys (1977)
- Signal Driver: a Morality Play for the Times (1982)
- Netherwood (1983)
- Shepherd on the Rocks (1987)

Screenplay

- The Night the Prowler (1978)

Autobiography

- Flaws in the Glass (1981)

== Honours and awards ==
White's numerous honours and awards include:

- 1941: Gold Medal of the Australian Literature Society for Happy Valley
- 1955: Gold Medal of the Australian Literature Society for The Tree of Man
- 1957: Miles Franklin Literary Award for Voss
- 1959: W. H. Smith Literary Award for Voss
- 1961: Miles Franklin Literary Award for Riders in the Chariot
- 1973: Nobel Prize in Literature
- 1973: Australian of the Year, National Australia Day Council
- 1975: Companion of the Order of Australia (AC, civil division). (Resigned in 1976)

White was offered a knighthood in 1970, but declined it.

== Sources ==
- Barnes, John (2014). "Australia's Prodigal Son". In vanden Driesen, Cynthia; Ashcroft, Bill (eds.). Patrick White Centenary : The Legacy of a Prodigal Son. Newcastle upon Tyne: Cambridge Scholars Publishing. ISBN 9781443860406.
- Brisbane, Katherine (2009). "Theatre from 1950". In Pierce, Peter (ed.). The Cambridge History of Australian Literature. Port Melbourne: Cambridge University Press. ISBN 9780521881654.
- Hewitt, Helen Verity (2002). Patrick White: Painter Manque. Carlton, Victoria: Miegunyah Press. ISBN 0-522-85032-4.
- Kiernan, Brian (1980). Patrick White. New York: St. Martin's Press. ISBN 0312598076.
- Lever, Susan (2009). "The challenge of the novel: Australian fiction since 1950". In Pierce, Peter (ed.). The Cambridge History of Australian Literature. Port Melbourne: Cambridge University Press. ISBN 9780521881654.
- Marr, David (1991). Patrick White: A Life. Sydney: Random House Australia. ISBN 0091825857.
- Marr, David, ed. (1994). Patrick White: Letters. Milsons Point, NSW: Random House Australia. ISBN 0091829925.
- Marr, David (2 April 2008). "Patrick White: The final chapter". The Monthly.
- Thomas, Martin (2024). "Patrick White and the path to Sarsaparilla: How a great novelist became a great unread". Australian Journal of Biography and History. 8 (8): 155–170. doi:10.22459/AJBH.08.2024.
- Webby, Elizabeth (2012). "White, Patrick Victor (Paddy) (1912–1990)". Australian Dictionary of Biography, National Centre of Biography, Australian National University.
- White, Patrick (1981). Flaws in the Glass: A Self-Portrait. London: Jonathan Cape. ISBN 022402924X.
- White, Patrick (1992). Brennan, Paul; Flynn, Christine (eds.). Patrick White Speaks. London: Penguin. ISBN 0140159339.
- Wilde, William H.; Hooton, Joy; Andrews, Barry (1994). "Patrick White". The Oxford Companion to Australian Literature (2nd ed.). Oxford University Press. ISBN 9780195533811.
- Williams, Mark (1993). Patrick White. New York: St. Martin's Press. ISBN 0312089902.
