= Voss (novel) =

1957 novel by Patrick White

- First edition
- Author: Patrick White
- Cover artist: Sidney Nolan
- Language: English
- Publisher: Eyre & Spottiswoode
- Publication date: 1957
- Publication place: Australia
- Media type: Print (hardback & paperback)
- Pages: 478 pp
- OCLC: 316076213
- Preceded by: The Tree of Man
- Followed by: Riders in the Chariot

Voss (1957) is the fifth published novel by Patrick White. It is based upon the life of the 19th-century Prussian explorer and naturalist Ludwig Leichhardt, who disappeared while on an expedition into the Australian outback.

== Plot summary ==
The novel centres on two characters: Voss, a German, and Laura, a young woman, orphaned and new to the colony of New South Wales. It opens as they meet for the first time in the house of Laura's uncle and the patron of Voss's expedition, Mr Bonner.

Johann Ulrich Voss sets out to cross the Australian continent in 1845. After collecting a party of settlers and two Aboriginal men, his party heads inland from the coast only to meet endless adversity. The explorers cross drought-plagued desert, then waterlogged lands until they retreat to a cave where they lie for weeks waiting for the rain to stop. Voss and Laura retain a connection despite Voss's absence and the story intersperses developments in each of their lives. Laura adopts an orphaned child and attends a ball during Voss's absence.

The travelling party splits in two and nearly all members eventually perish. The story ends some 20 years later at a garden party hosted by Laura's cousin Belle Radclyffe (née Bonner) on the day of the unveiling of a statue of Voss. The party is also attended by Laura Trevelyan and the one remaining member of Voss's expeditionary party, Mr Judd.

The strength of the novel comes not from the physical description of the events in the story but from the explorers' passion, insight and doom. The novel draws heavily on the complex character of Voss.

== Symbolism ==
The novel uses extensive religious symbolism. Voss is compared repeatedly to God, Christ and the Devil. Like Christ he goes into the desert, he is a leader of men and he tends to the sick. Voss and Laura have a meeting in a garden prior to his departure that could be compared to the Garden of Eden.

A metaphysical thread unites the novel. Voss and Laura are permitted to communicate through visions. White presents the desert as akin to the mind of man, a blank landscape in which pretensions to godliness are brought asunder. In Sydney, Laura's adoption of the orphaned child, Mercy, represents godliness through a pure form of sacrifice.

There is a continual reference to duality in the travelling party, with a group led by Voss and a group led by Judd eventually dividing after the death of the unifying agent, Mr Palfreyman. The intellect and pretensions to godliness of Mr Voss are compared unfavourably with the simplicity and earthliness of the pardoned convict Judd. Mr Judd, it is implied, has accepted the blankness of the desert of the mind, and in doing so, become more 'godlike'.

The spirituality of Australia's indigenous people also infuses the sections of the book set in the desert.

== Reception ==
The book was listed among the 100 greatest novels written in English by Guardian journalist Robert McCrum in 2015.

== Adaptations ==
=== Opera ===
Voss has also been adapted into an opera of the same name written by Richard Meale with the libretto by David Malouf. The world premiere was at the 1986 Adelaide Festival of Arts conducted by Stuart Challender.

=== Music ===
David Lumsdaine's Aria for Edward John Eyre also draws inspiration from Voss, in relating Eyre's journey across Australia's Great Australian Bight (that is, along the southern coast from what is now the Eyre Peninsula to King George's Sound, the site of modern Albany), as documented in his journals, but doing so in a psychologised form similar to the relationship White depicts between Voss and Laura Trevelyan.

=== Film ===
White wanted Voss to be produced as a film and Sydney musical promoter Harry M. Miller bought the rights. Ken Russell and then Joseph Losey were White's choice for director. Losey and scriptwriter David Mercer arrived in Sydney in 1977 but after a few days in the desert scouting locations the director was hospitalised with viral pneumonia. Miller wanted to cast Donald Sutherland as Voss and Mia Farrow as Laura Trevelyan but White disagreed saying that Farrow was too soft and of Sutherland, "That flabby wet mouth is entirely wrong. Voss was dry and ascetic – he had a thin mouth like a piece of fence-wire. I do think a whole characterisation can go astray on a single physical feature like that." Maximilian Schell was cast to play the explorer and the script was finalised but Miller was unable to raise sufficient capital for production and the film was never made.

== The Voss Journey (2009) ==
The Voss Journey was a four-day event which included seminars, concerts, films, and exhibitions inspired by the novel, hosted by the National Film and Sound Archive in collaboration with Canberra International Music Festival and many other institutions. It included presentations by many of the artists involved in the staging of the opera.
