= The Ham Funeral =

Play by Patrick White

- Original language: English
- Written by: Patrick White
- Genre: Comedy drama
- Setting: London

Premiere
- Date: 15 November 1961
- Place: Union Theatre, Adelaide

The Ham Funeral is a play by Australian writer Patrick White. It was written in 1948 and is loosely based on a painting by William Dobell, The Dead Landlord.

== Plot ==
The play is set in a filthy rooming house in the depressing context of post-war London, and has as its protagonist a young poet whose attempted seduction by the aptly named Mrs Lusty, his landlady, drives the tragicomic drama. The 'ham funeral' of the title is the feast to mourn the sudden death of Mrs Lusty's husband, held in Act 2.

== Performances ==
The Ham Funeral was submitted for and controversially rejected by the 1962 Adelaide Festival. It was instead performed by the University of Adelaide Theatre Guild in November 1961.

Major revivals include productions by Sydney Theatre Company in 1989, Melbourne's Malthouse Theatre in 2005, Sydney's Belvoir in 2000, and the State Theatre Company of South Australia and Adelaide Festival in 2012.

== Reception ==
Australia's New Theatre company described the play as "one of the most intriguingly original plays in Australian theatre history." Geoffrey Dutton is quoted summing up the immediate impact of the play's production, "Perhaps there was among the audience the thought that a reactionary Establishment was being beaten on its own ground, that the evening was going to be a triumph of the imagination over mediocrity. So it was."

A State Theatre Company of South Australia production of The Ham Funeral played to mixed reviews as part of the Adelaide Festival 2012, described by Paul Grabowsky as, "something which the Adelaide festival, finally, could see as unfinished business, finished."

== Adaptation ==
The Sydney Theatre Company's production of the play was filmed by the ABC in 1990.
