= Memoirs of Many in One =

Novel by Patrick White

- First edition cover
- Author: Patrick White
- Language: English
- Publisher: Jonathan Cape
- Publication date: 1986
- Publication place: Australia
- Media type: Print (hardback and paperback)
- Pages: 192
- ISBN: 0-224-02371-3

Memoirs of Many in One is a 1986 novel by Patrick White, in which White is taken to be editing the papers of a fictional Alex Gray.

== Manuscript ==
In 1988 a group called the Manuscript Appeal, supporting education in southern Africa, asked White to donate a manuscript for auction. He provided a handwritten draft of Memoirs of Many in One, and it was bought jointly by the State Library of New South Wales and the National Library of Australia.

White was notoriously opposed to inquiries into writers' creative processes, such as looking at draft manuscripts, and he referred to academics who pursued such inquiries as "ferrets". So, as State Library curator Paul Bunton pointed out, the manuscript he gave may well have been seeded specially for the ferrets, and therefore be an unreliable guide to his usual way of working.

For many years it was thought this manuscript was the only one by White to have been preserved, since his will directed that all his papers were to be destroyed when he died. In 2006 it turned out this was not the case. Barbara Mobbs, his long-time literary agent, and then literary executor, had ignored his instructions and preserved most of his papers (subsequently acquired by the National Library).
