= The Twyborn Affair =

1979 novel by Patrick White

- First edition
- Author: Patrick White
- Cover artist: Mon Mohan
- Language: English
- Publisher: Jonathan Cape
- Publication date: 1979
- Publication place: Australia
- Media type: Print (hardback and paperback)
- Pages: 432 pp
- ISBN: 0-09-945821-7
- OCLC: 247822285

The Twyborn Affair is a novel by Australian Nobel laureate Patrick White, first published in 1979. The three parts of the novel are set in a villa on the French Riviera before the First World War, a sheep station on the edge of Australia's Snowy Mountains in the inter-war period, and in London in the lead-up to the Second World War. Each part describes a different portion of the life of the protagonist, whose name and gender identity change with each section. Born male as Eddie Twyborn, in Part I he presents as a woman named Eudoxia, in Part II as male Eddie, and in Part III as female Eadith.

The seed of the novel was a reported exchange between the adventurer Herbert Dyce Murphy and his mother, in which the young boy claimed to be his mother's daughter Edith. The mother said she was glad, as she had always wanted a daughter. White heard about this episode from Barry Jones in 1974.

As in many of White's novels, the main focus is on identity; White views his subject from masculine–feminine, colonial–English, rural–metropolitan, and bourgeois–bohemian polarities. The writing has been described as vivid and painterly in its attention to landscape, and remorseless in its critical dissection of social conventions. The novel is a virtuosic display of White's characteristic "wicked" humour.

The Twyborn Affair was shortlisted for the Booker Prize in 1979, but was removed at the request of the author, that it make way for the work of younger and more deserving writers. This reflects White's refusal, later in life, of all literary awards. He made an exception for the 1973 Nobel Prize in Literature, but sent a surrogate, Sidney Nolan, to Sweden to accept the award on his behalf.

== Plot summary ==
Part I

The first part of the novel is told from two perspectives. An omniscient third person narration that centers on Joanie Golson is interspersed with diary entries written by Eudoxia Vatatzes. Joanie and Curly Golson are wealthy Australians vacationing in France. While out on a drive, Joanie observes a young woman living in a small cottage along with an older man and becomes fascinated by her. Unbeknownst to her, the woman is the child of a close friend of Joanie's in Australia (Eadie Twyborn). The young woman, who goes by the name Eudoxia Vatatzes, recognizes Joanie as her mother's friend and is disturbed by her intrusion into their life. Events conspire to bring them together, however, and the two couples end up having an awkward afternoon together at the cottage, after which Eudoxia and her elderly lover Angelos Vatatzes immediately flee the area. Shortly after settling into a new boarding house, Angelos dies, which closes out Part I.

Part II

Part II begins with Lieutenant Eddie Twyborn on a ship from Europe to Australia after the conclusion of World War I. It quickly becomes apparent that Eddie is the same person as Eudoxia Vatatzes from Part I. Now presenting as male (his birth gender), he attracts attention from both genders on the ship. Upon arriving in Australia, he visits his mother Eadie before taking up work at a sheep station. While at the sheep station, he carries on an affair with a married woman and is raped by a man.

Part III

In Part III, the protagonist is again presenting as female, this time as Eadith, the madam of a London brothel.
