= The Vivisector =

1970 novel by Patrick White

- First edition cover
- Author: Patrick White
- Cover artist: Tom Adams
- Language: English
- Publisher: Jonathan Cape
- Publication date: 1970
- Publication place: Australia
- Media type: Print
- ISBN: 0-14-003693-8
- OCLC: 29002043
- Dewey Decimal: 823
- LC Class: PZ3.W58469 Vi5 PR9619.3.W5

The Vivisector is the eighth published novel by Patrick White. First published in 1970, it details the lifelong creative journey of fictional artist/painter Hurtle Duffield. Named for its sometimes cruel analysis of Duffield and the major figures in his life, the book explores universal themes like the suffering of the artist, the need for truth and the meaning of existence.

== Background ==
The longest of White's novels, The Vivisector was written in 1968. While the novel was dedicated to painter Sidney Nolan, White denied any connection between Hurtle Duffield, the novel's central character, and Nolan or any other painter. Other literary critics have interpreted the novel as being largely autobiographical, with Australian literary critic Geordie Williamson noting that "The Vivisector is a great Australian novel. I think it's White's great autobiography to be honest."

== Plot summary ==
Hurtle Duffield is born into a poor Australian family. They adopt him out to the wealthy Courtneys, who are seeking a companion for their hunchbacked daughter Rhoda. The precocious Hurtle gains artistic inspiration from the world that surrounds him, his adoptive mother, Maman, and Rhoda; the prostitute Nance, who is his first real love; the wealthy heiress Olivia Davenport; his Greek mistress Hero Pavloussi and finally the child prodigy Kathy Volkov. He becomes famous and his paintings are in great demand. However, he is unimpressed by the monetary and status gain this brings and continues to live a spartan life, beholden to nobody — even the Prime Minister. In his final years he is drawn closer to his sister Rhoda, and after a stroke causes partial paralysis, is assisted by his protégé Don Lethbridge to produce a huge, final magnum opus to God — the Vivisector.

== Awards ==
White's biographer, David Marr, has claimed that White was being considered by a Nobel Prize committee to receive the Nobel Literature prize. However, the committee was reportedly offended by one of the central themes of the novel, which posed the question as to whether it was possible to be a human being and an artist at the same time, and decided not to award the prize to White that year. He later won the Literature prize in 1973.

White was announced, on 26 March 2010, as one of six authors shortlisted for the "Lost Man Booker Prize" of 1970, a contest delayed by 40 years because a reshuffling of the fledgling competition's rules that year disqualified nearly a year's worth of high-quality fiction from consideration.

== See also ==
- Visual arts of Australia
