= Riders in the Chariot =

1961 novel by Patrick White

- First UK edition
- Author: Patrick White
- Cover artist: Sidney Nolan
- Language: English
- Genre: Psychological fiction
- Publisher: Eyre & Spottiswoode
- Publication date: 1961
- Publication place: Australia
- Media type: Print (hardback)
- Pages: 643
- OCLC: 48871685
- Dewey Decimal: 823/.912 21
- LC Class: PR9619.3.W5 R533 2002

Riders in the Chariot is the sixth novel by Australian author Patrick White. It was published in 1961 and won the Miles Franklin Award that year. It also won the 1965 Gold Medal of the Australian Literature Society.

The novel is the story of the lives of four loosely connected people, whose common link is the mystic experience of the chariot of the title described in the Book of Ezekiel, and traces their lives towards the point where they realise they share the same vision.

The novel combines literature, mysticism and suburban life in 1950s Australia to show the ignorance and prejudice of the everyday people in reaction to the few who see the infinite, snowballing with catastrophic consequences

== Plot summary ==
The book begins with an epigraph from The Marriage of Heaven and Hell, in which William Blake imagines a conversation with the prophets Isaiah and Ezekiel. Asked how he could dare to claim that God had spoken to him, Isaiah says he came to sense the infinite in everything and concluded that the voice of honest indignation was itself the voice of God. Ezekiel says that the work of a prophet is to raise other men into a perception of the infinite.

=== Part I ===
In the years after World War II, Mary Hare lives on the outskirts of suburban Sarsaparilla. While possessed with a deep love of nature and animals, she is socially awkward and ostracised from the community, who regard her as an eccentric. Flashbacks to her childhood show her abuse and torment at the hands of her father, a Sydney wine merchant who married above his station and arrogantly squandered his wife’s fortune on the construction of Xanadu, the crumbling estate where Mary now lives. Her distant cousin Eustace Cleugh, who once visited Xanadu but responded to Mary’s childhood infatuation with disdain, has recently resumed financially supporting her after a long absence during the war. She was once nursed back to health from a serious illness by Ruth Godbold, during which she had visions of a fiery chariot; Mary inwardly believes Ruth shares the same vision.

With her new means, Mary hires Mrs Jolley to keep house for her. Jolley is outwardly religious but is soon revealed to be a callous, judgemental woman. The pair quickly develop a mutual fear and hostility of one another as Jolley strikes up a friendship with Mrs Flack, a kindred spirit and the town gossip who lives on her own in Sarsaparilla. Seeking refuge from the poisonous atmosphere of Xanadu, Mary takes refuge in the scrubland around the estate and encounters the elderly Mordecai Himmelfarb.

=== Part II ===
Mordecai shares his life story with Mary as the pair bond under a tree. Born in the 1880s to a wealthy Jewish merchant family in Germany, Mordecai’s early childhood was tinged with the faint awareness of the pogroms underway in eastern Europe at the time. He grows into an exceptional scholar and studies at Oxford, where a brief affair with the daughter of an English nobleman leaves him heartbroken. Soon before returning home to fight for Germany in World War I, his mother sends a letter to tell him that her father has renounced Judaism; relatives later blame her death on this decision. Mordecai wins a medal for his wartime service, marries and is later appointed to an English professorship in a small town.

The rise of the Third Reich sees his expulsion from university and his wife is taken away during Kristallnacht, never to be seen by Mordecai again. When the liberal couple sheltering him are taken away, Mordecai presents himself at a police station and is taken to a concentration camp by train. Many of his fellow passengers die on the journey. Mordecai is spared immediate extermination on arrival and escapes after a camp uprising. He is later helped to Palestine, where after a brief reunion with his brother-in-law, he impulsively announces his intention to settle in Australia.

=== Part III ===
Soon after his arrival in Sydney, Mordecai takes a metalworking job at Brighta Bicycle Lamps in Barranugli. He recognises that his employer Harry Rosetree is also a German Jew, but his overtures are sternly rebuffed by the factory owner, whose family are shown to be doing their best to assimilate to middle-class Australian society. Mrs Flack begins to spread malicious and unfounded gossip about Mordecai which she relays to Blue, another worker at the factory who she introduces to Mrs Jolley as her nephew. Mordecai accidentally injures his hand with a drill while at work one day and is tended to by his next-door neighbour, Ruth Godbold.

=== Part IV ===
Ruth is an impoverished and deeply religious woman supporting six young children by taking in laundry from other households. As a child she emigrates to Sydney from Britain after a farming accident kills her brother, and later works as a domestic servant in the household of wealthy socialite Jinny Chalmers-Robinson. She moves to Sarsaparilla with Tom, later revealed to be an abusive and philandering alcoholic. Their marriage comes to an end after she confronts him at a brothel where she also encounters and shows kindness to Alf Dubbo, an Aboriginal man who is treated abusively by the others present.

=== Part V ===
Mrs Jolley tells Mary she is terminating her service to live with Mrs Flack, and reveals the depths of her own bigotry by scorning Mary’s friendship with Mordecai. The depths of Mordecai’s ostracism from the rest of the Brighta factory workforce are shown. In the factory bathroom, Mordecai finds a copy of the Bible open to the description of the chariot in the Book of Ezekiel. Alf, employed as a cleaner at the factory, comes in to reclaim his book and the men share a terse introduction. Despite Alf’s reticence to open up to Mordecai, both men individually recognise they share a deep spiritual connection over the chariot.

Alf’s early life is recounted, including his abduction from his mother and childhood in the home of the Anglican clergyman Timothy Calderon, whose sister encourages his nascent gift for painting. Alf runs away as a teenager after Calderon’s sister catches both men having sex. Arriving in Sydney, he sublets a room from the prostitute Hannah, where he lives a reclusive existence honing his artistic talents by painting scenes of the Gospels. When Hannah steals some of his paintings and sells them, claiming to be helping his financial situation, he is deeply hurt by the betrayal and immediately leaves, later taking a room in Barranugli to work at the bicycle lamp factory.

=== Part VI ===
In the present day, Easter is looming. Sensing trouble, Rosetree quietly offers Himmelfarb the opportunity to stay at home during Passover. Mordecai also has a sense that there is a conspiracy against him, but he nonetheless returns to the factory on the day before Good Friday. Blue and his friends at the factory win a lottery syndicate and spend the morning drinking at a pub across the road. Wandering through the factory drunk, Blue is overcome by the sense of Mordecai’s otherness and reminded of Mrs Flack's mention of the Jewish deicide. Mordecai is seized and subjected to a mock crucifixion on a jacaranda tree outside the factory. Alf refuses to intervene and denies any association with Mordecai. At the same time, Mary Hare walks through Xanadu as a crack appears in the marble structure of her home, and she intuits that her friend is being killed.

Rosetree at first fails to intervene but eventually instructs the foreman to end the spectacle. Himmelfarb is cut down, but it later becomes clear he is mortally wounded. His wounds are tended to in the shed which Ruth’s family lives, with the assistance of Mary, as his own home is set alight and destroyed. Alf watches the trio from outside but leaves before his own presence is discovered, and Mordecai succumbs to his injuries.

Overcome by guilt over Mordecai's death, Rosetree hangs himself in his bathroom. Alf stays in his room and works for days on end to paint the scene he witnessed at Ruth’s house, which he incorporates into his picture of Ezekiel’s vision of the chariot. Soon after he finishes, he is found dead by his landlady; the painting is auctioned off in an estate sale and its present whereabouts, or even whether it survived, is unknown.

=== Part VII ===
Years later, Xanadu is demolished and sold off by an agent of the beneficiary of Mary’s will, Eustace Cleugh. The land is subdivided for Sydney’s expanding suburban fringe. Mary is presumed dead after leaving Sarsaparilla the night of Mordecai’s death, but her body has never been found.

Mrs Jolley discovers that Blue is actually Mrs Flack’s son, born out of wedlock. Separately, Mrs Jolley’s children are revealed to believe her responsible for the death of her husband, preventing her return to Melbourne — a fact Mrs Flack discovers snooping through Mrs Jolley’s letters. Both are condemned to live together in an environment of mutual fear, wary of the power each wields over the other.

Rosetree’s wife Shirl, since remarried, is invited to a society lunch with Ruth’s former employer Jinny and another woman. The trio debate whether what occurred at Sarsaparilla was a miracle, and Shirl loses her composure after recalling Harry's suicide.

Ruth watches her eldest daughter Else with her new partner Bob Tanner — both of whom helped tend to Mordecai — and realises that he will treat Else with the love and respect that she never knew in her own marriage. Walking past the land that was once Xanadu one day, she is overcome by the memory of Mordecai’s death. On future walks along the same route, she averts her eyes.

== Characters ==
The main four characters are outsiders with deeply different lives made more difficult because they are religious visionaries. Each experience the same vision of four horses drawing a chariot into a shining future: the fiery chariot from the Book of Ezekiel in the Hebrew bible; visions that make them vulnerable to – and affect the way they deal with – the wily plotting of others.

Mary Hare - an eccentric and troubled heiress born into a reputable family of early Australian settlers, now living in a decaying estate on the outskirts of Sarsaparilla. Dismissed as mad by most of the townsfolk, she nonetheless perceives with great clarity the events that will lead to the novel’s climax.

Mordecai Himmelfarb - A German Jew who leads a distinguished if provincial career as an English professor after decorated service in World War I, until the rising tide of anti-Semitism that accompanies the Third Reich robs him of his wife. He survives the Holocaust and settles in Sydney, taking a job in a machine shop.

Ruth Godbold - A devoutly religious woman with a large brood of young children who emigrates to Australia from England after a family tragedy. She briefly enters domestic service before an ill-considered marriage to a tradesman who treats her abusively.

Alf Dubbo - A half-Aboriginal member of the Stolen Generations who grows up in the care of a pastor who later sexually abuses him. He flees to Sydney where his artistic impulses are tempered by his mistrust of others and a self-destructive lifestyle.

Mrs Jolley - Mary Hare’s housekeeper, who treats her employer with cruel contempt and later leaves to take up residence with Mrs Flack.

Mrs Flack - A mean-spirited woman who helps precipitate the events that culminate with the attack on Himmelfarb.

Timothy Calderon - A clergyman who raises Alf Dubbo and later sexually abuses him.

Jinny Chalmers-Robinson - A wealthy Sydney socialite with a distant relationship to her husband who briefly employs Ruth Godbold in domestic service.

Eustace Cleugh - Mary Hare’s distant cousin, the object of her childhood infatuations and later her modest benefactor.

Konrad and Ingeborg Stauffer - A liberal couple who shelter Himmelfarb as the Nazi regime’s anti-Semitic policies gradually reach their zenith with the Holocaust. Both are later arrested and presumably executed.

Mollie Khalil - The owner of an illegal brothel in Sarsaparilla, where Ruth Godbold confronts her abusive husband.

Harry Rosetree - aka Haim Rosenbaum. The owner of the Brighta Bicycle Lamps factory which employs Dubbo and Himmelfarb.

Shirl Rosetree - aka Shulamith Rosenbaum. The wife of Harry, who has pushed her husband and raised her children in line with the assimilationist policies of postwar Australia.

== Setting ==
Most of the narrative is set in Sarsaparilla, the fictional stand-in for the Sydney suburb of Castle Hill, where White lived with his partner Manoly Lascaris after returning to Australia. Himmelfarb and Dubbo work at a factory in nearby Barranguli, a fictionalised version of Baulkam Hills. The area is today colloquially known as Sydney’s “Bible belt”.

== Religious symbolism ==
The primary form of symbolism within the book is through the chariot (or merkabah) as described in the Book of Ezekiel, a vehicle for God's chosen ones.

The novel contains several narrative references to the Gospels. As Dubbo watches Mary Hare and Ruth Godbold tend to a dying Himmelfarb, he perceives them as Mary Magdalene and Mary, Mother of Jesus. Mary Hare’s own disappearance shortly afterwards is reminiscent of the Assumption of Mary. Dubbo’s denial of Himmelfarb as the latter is strung up at the factory mirrors Peter’s denial of Jesus, while Harry Rosetree’s last day loosely echoes the betrayal and suicide of Judas.

== Reception ==
Riders in the Chariot was singled out for praise by the Nobel Prize in Literature committee when White was named a laureate in 1973. The panel described it as "a sacrificial drama, tense, yet with an everyday setting, in the midst of current Australian reality."

The novel won the Miles Franklin Award in 1961. White had earlier won Australia’s chief literary prize in its inaugural year for Voss.
