= Manoly Lascaris =

Life partner of Patrick White (1912–2003)

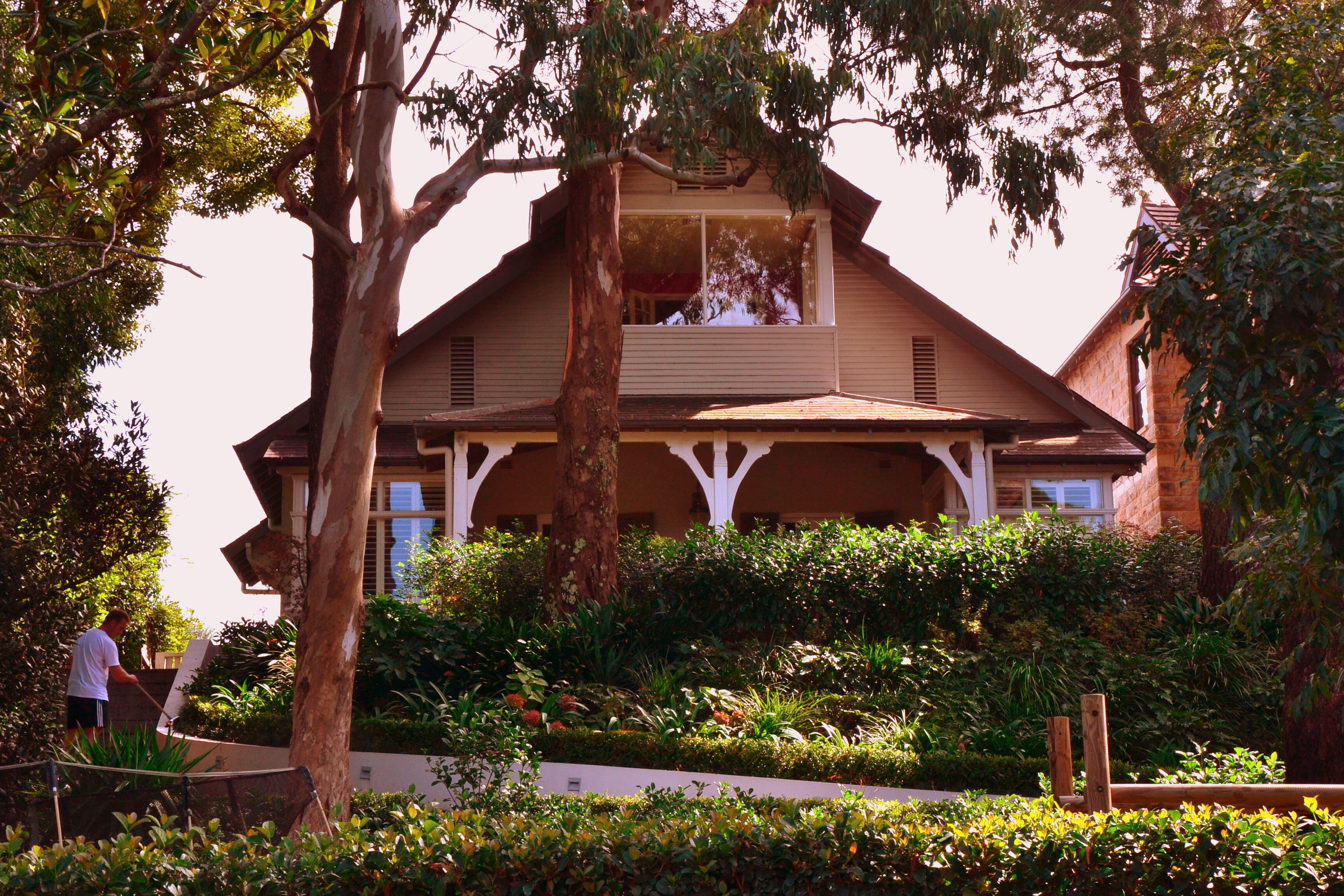
Highbury, the house Lascaris shared with Patrick White

Emmanuel George "Manoly" Lascaris (Greek: Μανόλης Λάσκαρης; 5 August 1912 – 13 November 2003) was the life partner of the Australian novelist and dramatist Patrick White. Lascaris met White while they both were servicemen in the Second World War. After the war, Lascaris and White lived together in Cairo, then moved to Sydney, Australia.

== Early life ==
Lascaris was born in Cairo, the son of a wealthy Greco-Egyptian father from Smyrna in Asia Minor and an American mother. He was raised in Athens and Alexandria. In 1941 he joined the Greek Army in exile in Egypt and soon after, in Alexandria, met White who was then serving with the Royal Air Force.

White and Lascaris lived together in Cairo for six years before moving to a small farm purchased by White at Castle Hill, in 1948. After the death of White's mother in 1963, they moved into a large house, Highbury, in Centennial Park, where they lived for the rest of their lives. Although it was widely known that they were lovers, such matters were not publicly discussed in Australia at that time. Lascaris was sometimes referred to as White's "housekeeper." The relationship was not openly discussed until White published his memoirs, Flaws in the Glass, in 1981. Lascaris would usually read White's manuscripts during the writing phase but was not given the chance with the memoirs. When they were published, he was not given prior warning that White had openly discussed their relationship and made a variety of comments on Lascaris' family.

== Later life ==
After White's death in 1990, Lascaris was allowed, by the terms of the will, to stay in the house in Centennial Park and to receive income from White's share portfolio (after Lascaris died, these assets would be shared among four charitable causes.) Although Lascaris claimed that White left him nothing, he was well provided for. Lascaris lived alone there until his health failed in 2003. He then moved into a nursing home, Lulworth, which had been White's childhood home. White's biographer David Marr wrote:

A last coincidence was waiting. When it was time for Lascaris to move to a nursing home, he was taken to Lulworth, the old mansion at the back of Kings Cross which was Patrick's childhood home before becoming a hospital after the war. The shades of so many of White's characters hung around the house. Aunt Theo gazed across the water to Darling Point. Laura Trevelyan waited here for the explorer Johann Ulrich Voss to call. Hurtle Duffield played under the bunya pine on the drive. Now the cast was joined by the original of all the dark, wise, muscular Greeks of the novels. Manoly died at Lulworth on 13 November 2003, at the age of 91, oblivious to the closing of a great circle that had come to embrace Scone and Smyrna, Sydney and Alexandria, the Whites and the Lascaris ...

Highbury was later given a state government heritage listing because of its association with Patrick White.

== Appreciation ==
Lascaris was considered in many ways the gentle and urbane face with the prickly and difficult White. David Marr credits Lascaris with being the driving force who kept White to his literary labours, including the string of novels that won White the Nobel Prize for Literature in 1973. White referred to Lascaris as "the small Greek of immense moral strength who became the central mandala in my life's hitherto messy design".

Marr wrote in an obituary for Lascaris:

Everyone loved Manoly. He was courtly, intuitive and gentle. He protected people from White's outbursts of fury while remaining, at heart, absolutely loyal to his lover. 'There must be one person in the world Patrick can trust absolutely'
