= The Eye of the Storm (novel) =

Novel by Patrick White

- First edition
- Author: Patrick White
- Cover artist: Desmond Digby
- Language: English
- Publisher: Jonathan Cape
- Publication date: 1973
- Publication place: Australia
- Media type: Print (Hardback & Paperback)
- Pages: 608 pp
- ISBN: 0-224-00902-8
- OCLC: 1147089
- Dewey Decimal: 823
- LC Class: PR9619.3.W5 E9 1973

The Eye of the Storm is the ninth published novel by the Australian novelist and 1973 Nobel Prize-winner, Patrick White. It tells the story of Elizabeth Hunter, the powerful matriarch of her family, who still maintains a destructive iron grip on those who come to say farewell to her in her final moments upon her deathbed.

Dorothy was breathless with resentment for what she herself could no more than half-remember, had perhaps only half discovered - on the banks of the Seine? in dreams? as part of that greatest of all obsessions, childhood? and how could Elizabeth Hunter have got possession of anything so secret? Only Mother was capable of slicing in half what amounted to psyche, then expecting the rightful owner to share.

— Patrick White, The Eye of the Storm Chapter Eight

It is regarded as one of White's best novels, largely owing to the reputation it received from the Swedish Academy when they specifically named it as the book that confirmed White's designation as a Literature Laureate.

== Film adaptation ==
A film adaptation directed by Fred Schepisi and starring Charlotte Rampling as Elizabeth Hunter and Geoffrey Rush and Judy Davis as Elizabeth's children Basil and Dorothy was released in September 2011.
