= Lord Livingstone Ramsay =

Australian architect (1867–1924)

Councillor Lord Livingstone Ramsay
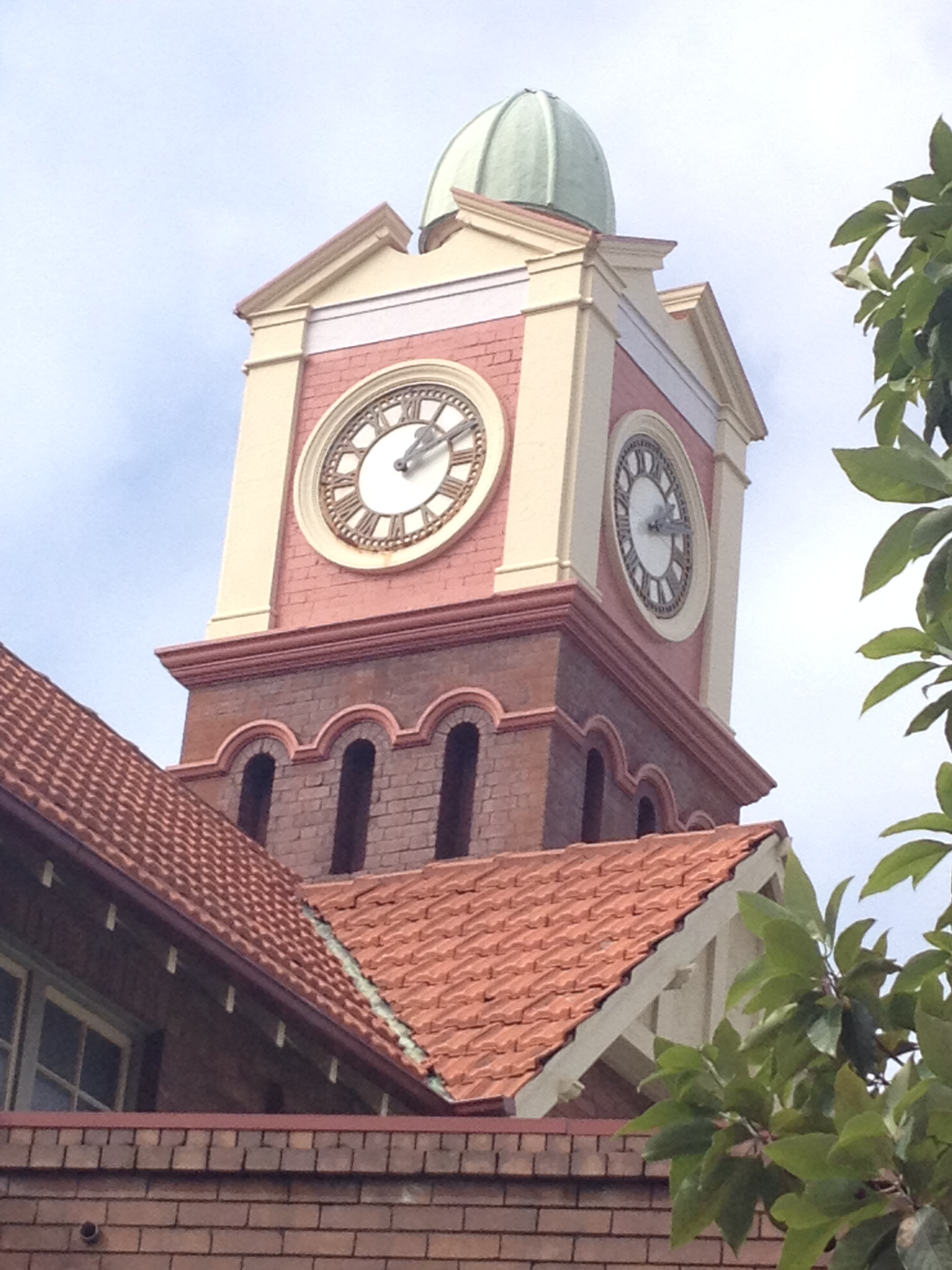
- RAS Clock Tower

President of Hornsby Shire
- In office 1909–1913
- Preceded by: William Nixon
- Succeeded by: John Schwebel

Personal details
- Born: 11 December 1867 Leichhardt, NSW
- Died: 18 July 1924 (aged 56) Elizabeth Bay, NSW
- Spouse: Mary
- Children: Four children
- Education: Newington College
- Occupation: Architect

Lord Livingstone "Livie" Ramsay (11 December 1867 – 18 July 1924) was an Australian architect active in the first quarter of the 20th century. He was known professionally as L L Ramsay. His work encompassed the styles of the Federation Bungalow in domestic design and Federation Free Classical in civic and commercial design. He was active in local government and was President of Hornsby Shire.

== Family and early life ==
Ramsay was born at Kalouan in Leichhardt, New South Wales, the son of Kate Dorothy (née de Mestre) and David Ramsay. He was a grandson of Prosper de Mestre. His father was the great grandson of Simeon Lord and his mother was the sister of Etienne Livingstone de Mestre – hence the names Lord Livingstone. The artist Roy De Maistre (born Leroy Livingstone de Mestre) was his first cousin. In 1882, at 14 years of age, he commenced senior education at Newington College under the headmastership of Joseph Coates.

== Architecture ==
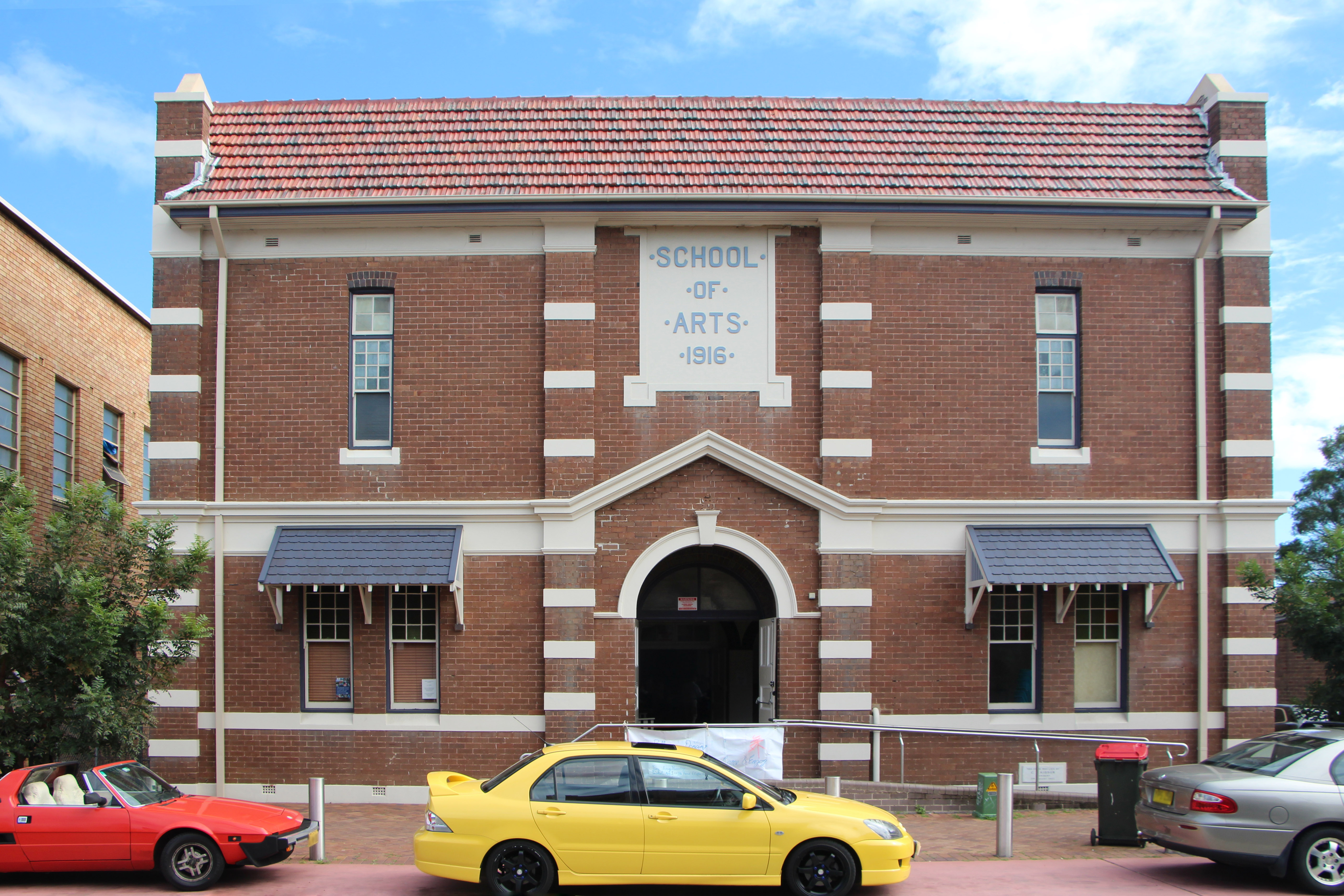
Epping Community Centre, originally known as the School of Arts

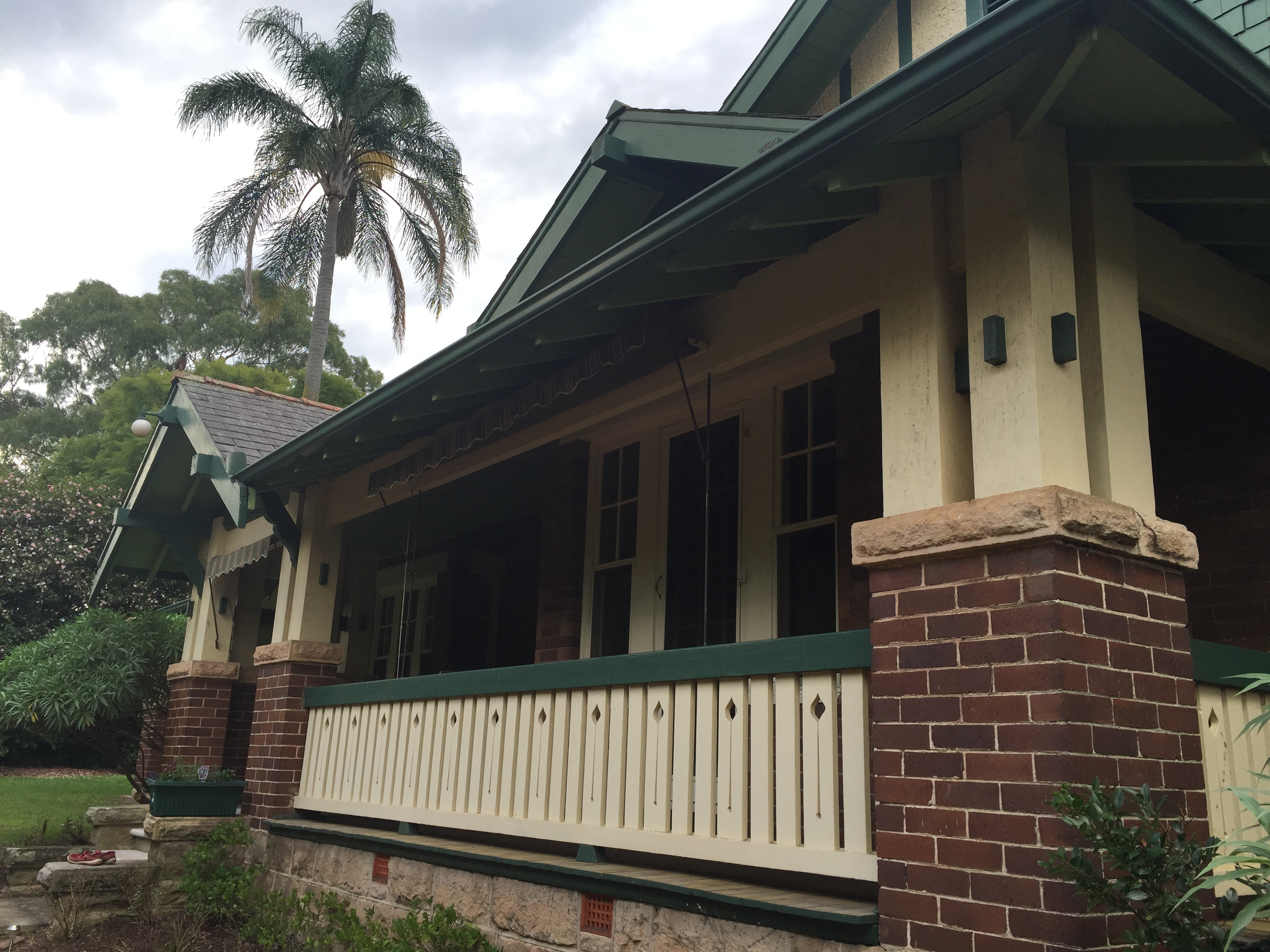
The Vessey house on Epping Road, Epping, New South Wales

Following high school, Ramsay was articled in architecture and studied at Sydney Technical College. In 1887, Ramsay became an associate of the Institute of Architects of New South Wales (a professional body pre-dating the Royal Australian Institute of Architects) under the presidency of Thomas Rowe. The following buildings are known to have been designed by Ramsay:

- Rawson, Moore Park (1901)
  Built as a residence for Frederick Webster, the Secretary of the Royal Agricultural Society of New South Wales from 1884 to 1905. It is a brick building in the Federation Arts and Crafts style. The chimneys have two tone brickwork that are now painted and the steep hipped roof was terracotta tiled but is now concrete tiled. The house has timber shingling to the gable ends and tessellated tile work on the entrance porch. There are tendril wrought iron brackets supporting the entrance awning and a large semi-circular bay window in rusticated sandstone projecting from the front wall. The doors and windows are timber, with metal hoods over some windows. The house is now used as offices within the Fox Studios complex.
- Poultry Pavilion, Sydney Showground (Moore Park) (1901)
  The building was 150 ft by 100 ft and cost £1500.
- Wine Kiosk, Sydney Showground (Moore Park) (1902)
  The kiosk was located in the machinery section, close to the vehicle pavilion, on Park Road, between Burgundy Street and Claret Street on the south-western side of the showground. It was constructed to test and display local wine products and was 80 ft in length by 40 ft, with a cellar beneath that was 40 ft by 25 ft. Built of brick, with cavity walls for coolness, the building was topped with a tiled roof and flèche. It was fitted throughout with shelving, and had water and gas services. Papers, wine and coins were placed under a memorial cornerstone, which was officially put in place by the Hon John Kidd, Minister for Mines & Agriculture. The Kiosk was opened in 1902 at a cost £1200 and refurbished in 1936. During demolition in 1995 the memorial cornerstone was removed and the contents saved and although damaged they have been conserved by the RAS Heritage Centre.
- St. Paul's Anglican Church, Carlingford (1908)
  Designed a vestry as an addition to the existing stone 1850 church.
- Northcote Road, Lindfield (1912)
  Three bungalow cottages at number 5, 7 and 9. 14 Northcote Road was built in the same year.
- Dobroyde, Burwood (1913)
  Built for his brother, Archibald Ernest Ramsay (1869–1924), who was a Sydney dentist.
- School of Arts, Epping (1906–1916)
  This building is now known as the Epping Community Centre and is at 9 Oxford Street, near the railway station. It has a capacity for 300 people in its combined areas combined and was built in three stages between 1906 and 1916. It was officially opened in 1909. The building has a large auditorium with a stage, two meeting rooms, a commercial standard kitchen, and a second smaller hall downstairs.
- Australian Gas Light Company offices, Sydney (1914)
  The building was five stories high with a frontage to Parker Street of 210 ft. The basement was formed by a disused gasholder tank of 60 ft in diameter and 30 ft in depth. The main walls of the building over this tank were supported on columns that extended from the ground level to the solid rock at the bottom of the gasholder pit. The main floors of the building had a clear span of 30 ft and cantilevered 6 ft over the interior courtourtyard. Reinforced concrete was used throughout the project including foundations, columns and beams, internal and fire escape staircases, floors, lintels, and cantilevered balconies.
- Vessey House, Epping (1917)
  A villa residence of nine main rooms with the most modern conveniences including revolving wall beds. These allowed the residents to sleep either in the open-air or in a bedroom. Photographs of the newly built house are held by the State Library of New South Wales but the building that stood at 14 Epping Road was demolished in 2016.

== Local government ==
Ramsay served as a Hornsby Shire Councillor from 1908 until 1922 and was Shire President from 1910 until 1913.

== Royal Agricultural Society ==
He was a councillor of the RAS from 1899 until 1905 and undertook a considerable amount of design work at the Showground at Moore Park as well as showing poultry and cattle.

== Family life and death ==
On 23 April 1902 at All Saints Anglican Church, Petersham, Ramsay, then of Lyriclea, Five Dock, married Mary Alice Cape, second daughter of Rollo Cape, of Bona Vista, Petersham. The Ramsays settled at Highands, a twenty-acre property, in Carlingford, New South Wales, and had four children. The family home was described in the press at the time as: "This dwelling, a charming abode of latest design, exquisitely furnished and replete with every up-to-date convenience, stands in a pretty garden ... situated on an eminence on the right of the Pennant Hills Road." Ramsay died in a private hospital at Elizabeth Bay on 18 July 1924.
