= Mary Ann Black =

- Born: 1 October 1801; George St., Sydney, New South Wales, Australia
- Died: 11 July 1861 (aged 59); Sydney, New South Wales, Australia
- Other name: Mary Ann de Mestre
- Spouse: Prosper de Mestre (1789–1844)
- Children: 10 children: Prosper Jean (Prosper John) de Mestre (1821–1863); Andre Cotteral de Mestre (1823–1917); Helen Mary Williams nee de Mestre (1825–1907); Sarah Louisa Wason nee de Mestre (1827–?); Melanie Isabella Lovegrove nee de Mestre (1829–1925); Etienne Livingstone de Mestre (1832–1916); Mary Ann Hart nee de Mestre (1834–1925); Katherine Dorothy Ramsay nee de Mestre (1836–1905); Louisa Jane Hutchison nee de Mestre (1839–?) Annette Marland Slade nee de Mestre (1841–1936)
- Parent(s): Captain John Black (1778–1802) & Mary Hyde (1779–1864)

Mary Ann de Mestre (née Black; 1 October 1801 – 11 July 1861) was the wife of Prosper de Mestre (1789–1844) a French-Australian Sydney businessman in the early 19th century; and the mother of Etienne Livingstone de Mestre (1832–1916) the trainer of the racehorse Archer who won the first and second Melbourne Cups in 1861 and 1862, and an Australian horse trainer. It was on her 1,300-acre (5.3 km^{2}) property of "Terara" on the Shoalhaven River near Nowra on the South Coast of New South Wales that Etienne established a horse stud, stable and racecourse.

== Early life ==
Mary Ann Black, was born in Sydney on 1 October 1801. Her mother was the former convict Mary Hyde (1779–1864) who in 1855 took the Commissioners of City of Sydney to the House of Lords and won. Her father was Captain John Black (1788–1802), a ship's officer and a privateer (state-sanctioned pirate). Mary Ann was their second child, and only daughter. Her father died in 1802 when his ship the Fly was lost at sea with all hands. After this Mary Ann's mother moved in with (and later married) a business associate of Mary Ann's late father Simeon Lord (1771–1840) a pioneer merchant and a magistrate in Australia, who became Mary Ann's stepfather. In July 1807 Mary Ann was baptised at St Philip's Church in Sydney.

Her stepfather Simeon Lord held land in trust for Mary Ann and her brother, land that backed onto the Tank Stream and had originally been leased by their late father Captain John Black, where Mary Ann and her brother had been born, and where her mother had been living prior to her relationship with Simeon Lord. On her marriage Mary Ann received her portion of the land in George Street, Sydney as a dower.

== Marriage to Prosper de Mestre ==
Mary Ann married at the age of 19 on 1 March 1821 at St Philip's Church in Sydney to Prosper de Mestre who was 12 years her senior, and a business associate of her stepfather Simeon Lord. Prosper, a merchant like her stepfather, was a good catch, and the large family was well and luxuriously provided for, becoming an important part of the fabric of Sydney in the 1820s to the 1840s. Her husband eventually owned properties in Sydney, and elsewhere in New South Wales, including at Shoalhaven on the South Coast. Mary Ann was also a good catch for de Mestre, with her stepfather Simeon Lord's connections being invaluable to de Mestre's business dealings.

When her husband Prosper de Mestre became insolvent in 1844, and most of his land and property needed to be auctioned to pay his debts, Mary Ann moved to prevent the Shoalhaven properties being sold. As the George St. property had been her dower, she questioned whether it should be included in the sale. Her solution was that the more valuable George Street property could be included in the sale, if the Shoalhaven properties were not. In exchange she also asked for "the whole of the plate, horses etc., etc., on the establishment in Liverpool Street, the six cows, horse and cart at Helsarmel", and to be "permitted to occupy the thirty-two acres [13 ha] at Petersham until the house at Shoal Haven can be rendered fit for the residence of my family." The family house in Liverpool St, and its "elegant Household Furniture", was sold by auction on 16 May 1844, and the family was moved to briefly to Petersham and then onto Terara, which Mary Ann's husband Prosper had initially developed as a hobby farm.

Over a period of twenty years Mary Ann gave birth to 10 children, in the day when home births were the norm. When her husband Prosper de Mestre died in 1844 she was left with a large family to raise that included adult children and teenagers, but also included young children, with four children under the age of 10, and her youngest child being was less than 3 years old.

To raise her family Mary Ann continued to work the Shoalhaven property of Terara with the aid of her three sons. Mary Ann, together with her three sons, Prosper John (1821–1863), Andre (1823–1917) and Etienne (1832–1916) de Mestre, was also instrumental in furthering the development of the village of Terara near her "Terara" property after her husband's death in 1844. They added three wharves in 1854, in 1856 a Church of England on land she donated and with capital she largely provided, and established a steam-driven flour mill in 1856. The steam flourmill was managed by the eldest son, Prosper John de Mestre who lived at Millbank. Andre and Etienne de Mestre lived at Terara House. By 1866 the village of Terara was a bigger and more important centre than Nowra. When the Shoalhaven River flooded in 1870 settlement began to shift from Terara to the Nowra site 3 kilometres (1.9 mi) west.

== Later years ==
Mary Ann Black was a widow for 16 years before her death on 11 July 1861. She left a will that divided her property amongst her children. Millbank was left to Prosper John de Mestre, along with the steam mill and premises which he was occupying at the time. The Terara House and property was left to Andre and Etienne de Mestre, and the 7 girls each received a portion of land. Mary Ann was buried on the Terara property next to her husband Prosper de Mestre on land that she had donated to the church. Against her stated wishes, the land has been sold by the church, and the exact location of the graves is now lost.

== Family descendants ==
Black's other descendants include:

- Sarah Melanie de Mestre (1877–1961) who distinguished herself as a nurse in France and Flanders in World War I, and whose decorations included the Royal Red Cross which was presented to her at Buckingham Palace by King George V on 3 June 1918 (the King's birthday).
- Roy de Maistre, CBE (1894–1968), a successful Australian artist.
- Guboo Ted Thomas (1909–2002) an Aboriginal leader, and the last initiated tribal elder on the South Coast of New South Wales.
- Margaret Augusta de Mestre (1915–1942), a nurse who was killed in action on a hospital ship on 26 February 1942 in the bombing of Darwin during World War II.
- Neville de Mestre (c.1938–present), an Australian mathematician and author, Emeritus Professor of Maths at Bond University, and who has held the titles of World Iron Man champion in the 60–64 age group, and Australian and World Masters surfing champion in the over-65 group for body surfing;
- Lloyd Nolan Hornsby (1947–present), an Aboriginal artist.
