= Pakie Macdougall =

Australian suffragette

Augusta "Pakie" Macdougall
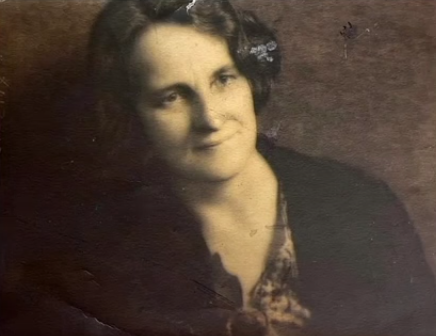
- Born: Augusta Poole; 25 December 1875; Waverley, New South Wales
- Died: 8 May 1945 (aged 69); Sydney Hospital
- Known for: Pakie's cafe
- Spouse: Duncan Macdogall
- Children: Robin Macdougall

Augusta (Pakie) Macdougall (25 December 1875 – 8 May 1945) was a suffragette in England and a leading figure of the Australian theatre and the owner of a café that was home to the literati of Sydney.

== Life ==
Macdougall was born in the Sydney suburb of Waverley in 1875 on Christmas Day. She was the fifth child of Clara Ann (born Wonnocott) and Benjamin Quiddington Poole who worked in a quarry. After attending Leichhardt Superior Public School she trained as a nurse at Sydney's Royal Prince Alfred Hospital. Her interests were in feminism and politics in general.

She went out to England in 1903 to be reunited with Duncan MacDougall who had been born in Scotland but had been brought up in Australia. They married at the City Temple in 1904. They were both socialists and Augusta had become an early suffragette as she had joined the Women's Social and Political Union which had been formed in 1903. In December 1906 she and four others were jailed in Manchester after refusing to pay a fine of twenty shillings. She had been involved in demonstrations outside the House of Commons. She had disobeyed an instruction by the police. She was caring for a suffragette who had been hurt by a mounted police officer's horse and she refused to leave her. She went to Holloway Prison for a fortnight. She was already pregnant as four months later their son was born - in the future Prime Minister Ramsay MacDonald's house. Her son, Robin, began to talk and his early word for his mother was "Pakie". In 1907 she and her husband published, "The Bond of Music: An Anthology of English Poems on Music".

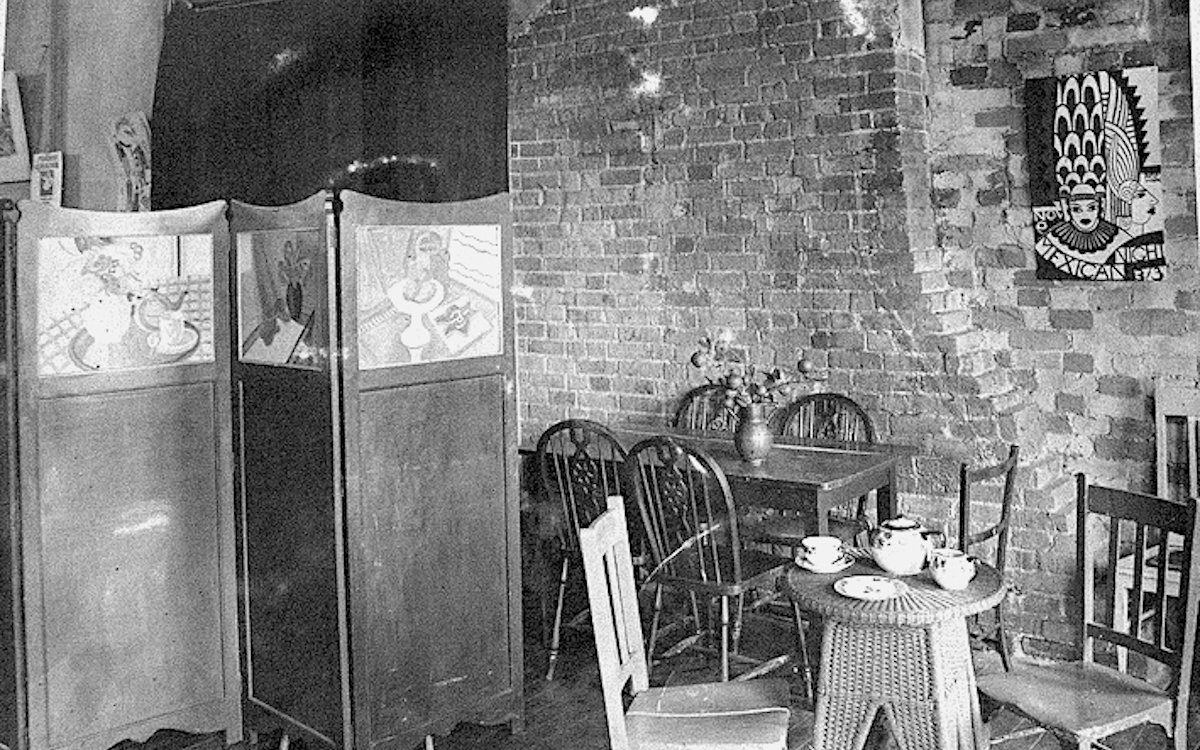
Mexican night was in 1929 at Pakies Club in Sydney

She and her husband separated in December 1928 and this did not help the Playbox theatre that they had tried to foster. It was based on the theatre group led by Eugene O'Neill. Her husband was a talented teacher and less gifted actor, while Augusta had been "the guiding spirit" of the theatre's productions and the company's secretary. The theatre moved twice and ended in 1931, meanwhile Augusta opened a cafe called "Pakie's" in 1929 at 219 Elizabeth Street.

The American architect Walter Burley Griffin and the Australian artist Roy de Maistre created the interior decoration for the cafe. Pakie's served basic food for struggling artists and there was no illegal grog, moreover Augusta was a vegetarian, so the menu included her macaroni cheese. Each month the cafe served more exotic food for an evening themed to different countries. Pakie's club served food but also culture. Each week writers and artists would show their work and this would include lectures and new plays.

In 1935 Eric Saunders painted her portrait, titled "Mrs Pakie Macdougall". It was one of the 120 entries that year for the Archibald Prize.

== Death and legacy ==
Macdougall died in Sydney Hospital in 1945 as the result of being hit by a lorry the day before. Her cafe continued although maybe on a more commercial footing until 1966. The portrait of Pakie by Eric Saunders, which had been on the cafe's walls, was taken by her family. Her husband remarried. Dierdre O'Connell received a fellowship for her work on "Pakie’s Club: Mapping the Literary Salons of Augusta “Pakie” MacDougall 1875–1945" in 2023.
