= Etienne L. de Mestre =

Australian breeder and jockey

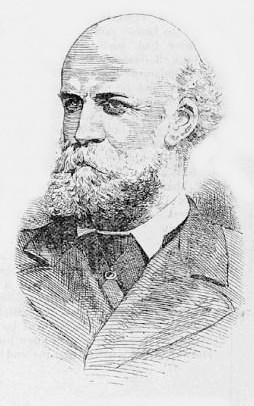

Personal information
- Full name: Etienne Livingstone El Mestre
- Nationality: Australian
- Born: 9 April 1832 George Street, Sydney, New South Wales, Australia
- Died: 22 October 1916 (aged 84) "Mount Valdemar", Moss Vale, New South Wales, Australia
- Occupations: Thoroughbred racehorse trainer & breeder racing identity
- Spouses: Clara Eliza Rowe (1852-1934)
- Children: 1 (illegitimate) child with Sarah Lamb: Helen Ahoy nee Bond nee de Mestre (c.1850-1934) 11 children with his wife Clara Eliza Rowe: Etienne George de Mestre (1874-1932); Helen Melanie Amy; Ramsay nee de Mestre (1876-1963); Alice Gertrude Kate; Morrice nee de Mestre (1878-1939); John Charles Prosper de Mestre (1879-1957); Hurtle Edward de Mestre (1881-1922); Marie Annette Clare; Badgery nee de Mestre (1884-1961); Edward MacKenzie de Mestre (1887-1972); Nellie Rowe; Yates nee de Mestre (1889-1970); Unnamed Boy (1893); Leroy Livingstone de Mestre (Roy De Maistre) (1894-1968) Beryl Marjorie de Mestre (1897-1981)

Horse racing career
- Sport: Horse racing

Etienne Livingston de Mestre (9 April 1832 – 22 October 1916), was a 19th-century Australian breeder and jockey of Thoroughbred racehorses. He was Australia's first outstanding racehorse trainer and racing identity. In his 30-year career, he experienced all the highs and the lows of the turf in a career which ended with him dependent on donations from racing friends.

With the five wins de Mestre achieved in the Cup's first 18 years, he held the record for training the most Melbourne Cup winners for nearly 100 years. De Mestre won the first two Melbourne Cups with Archer in 1861 and 1862, and later trained a further three winners: Tim Whiffler (1867); Chester (1877); and Calamia (1878). He set a training record for Melbourne Cup winners which was finally broken by Bart Cummings in 1977. De Mestre also trained many other feature race winners including two AJC and two VRC Derbies and an Epsom Handicap. In recognition of his outstanding achievements, Etienne de Mestre was inducted into the Australian Racing Hall of Fame part of the Australian Racing Museum on 12 September 1992. In the racing industry one could best describe Etienne de Mestre as the "Bart Cummings" (the greatest of all Australian Racehorse trainers) of the 19th century.

== Early life ==
Etienne was born in George Street, Sydney, on 9 April 1832 in his parents' home, on the same block of land backing onto the Tank Stream that his mother had been born 30 years earlier. He was the third and youngest son of the Frenchman Prosper de Mestre, a Sydney merchant, and Sydney-born Mary Ann Black and grandson of privateer John Black. Many of these he bred himself, and many others such as Archer, Tim Whiffler, Chester, Yattendon, Plant and "Veno" he trained, and even sometimes rode. De Mestre's association with George Taylor Rowe (1822–1859) of Liverpool, England, the owner of the celebrated Veno, and the father of the little girl who was to grow up and one day to be his wife; and with his good school-friend Thomas John "Tom" Roberts (1831–1899) of Jembaicumbene near Braidwood, one of the owners of many champion horses including Mariner, Sailor, Archer, and Tim Whiffler. He occupied a leading place among the racing celebrities of Australia and was the first national sportsman to represent the Shoalhaven district where he lived.

As a school boy Etienne loved thoroughbred horse racing, and developed into an excellent horseman, amateur jockey, and trainer. De Mestre spent his school holidays racing and working with the thoroughbred horses on his school-friend Thomas John "Tom" Roberts' "Exeter Farm" at Jembaicumbene. It has been said that in 1847, at the age of 15, and just three years after his father's death, he won the main event at Bathurst on his favourite Roberts' horse Sweetheart. There is no newspaper support to sustain this story. It is possible that he was at the Goulburn races as a spectator after having ridden there with Tom. De Mestre later leased and trained Nancy, a foal of Sweetheart. He raced Nancy at Numba in 1856 and 1857.

== Family ==
In about 1850, Etienne's first child, Helen "Ellen" de Mestre (c.1850–1934), was born in the vicinity of Jembaicumbene near Braidwood when he was only about 18. Ellen's mother was the Aboriginal girl Sarah Lamb. One of Ellen's grandchildren, Guboo Ted Thomas (1909–2002), who was born under a gumtree at Jembaicumbene, became a prominent Aboriginal leader, and she was the last initiated tribal elder on the South Coast of New South Wales; and one of her great grandchildren, Lloyd Nolan Hornsby (1947–) was born in Brisbane to "Ellen" de Mestre's grand daughter Gladys. Lloyd Nolan Hornsby came to prominence as an urbanized contemporary Aboriginal artist combining Aboriginal dot painting with visions of contemporary Australian life and landscapes.

== Early career ==
In the early 1850s de Mestre went into partnership with his elder brother Andre Cotteral de Mestre (1823–1917) and leased a section of the "Terara" (near the mouth of the Shoalhaven River) from their mother. There they established a horse stud, stable and racecourse where unofficial races were held and which was said to be the finest training track in the colony. After inheriting "Terara" on their mother's death in 1861 they converted the rest of the farm into the best training and breeding establishment outside Sydney.

In 1857 Etienne de Mestre rode George Taylor Rowe's horse Plant to victory in the Liverpool Club's Members Plate. George Taylor Rowe's horse Veno had already been sent from Sydney to Melbourne by steamship. After the Liverpool meeting de Mestre steamed to Melbourne with George Taylor Rowe to assist in the training preparation of Veno for the first inter-colonial Champion Challenge race between the champions of New South Wales and Victoria at Flemington. Veno won against the Victorian champion in front of 20,000 spectators.

Etienne became recognised as a master trainer, coming to prominence after leasing, training, and successfully racing Rowland Hassall & Tom Roberts' "Exeter Farm" bred colts Mariner and Sailor from 1857 to 1859. This made him an overnight success as a trainer, with owners throughout the area keen to send him their best horses.

== Melbourne Cup ==
In 1861, De Mestre first sent horses of his own from Sydney to Melbourne by steamship. He sent three horses to run in the inaugural Melbourne Cup. His prowess as a trainer was significantly boosted by winning the Cup with one of these horses, Archer, a horse that he leased from Hassall & Roberts and raced in his own name. Archer raced again the next day to win another 2-mile long distance race, the Melbourne Town Plate. The next year, after Archer had won the 1862 AJC Queen Elizabeth Stakes in Randwick, Sydney, de Mestre again shipped horses including Archer to Melbourne to race in the Melbourne Cup. Archer won his second Melbourne Cup by 10 lengths. Winning the Melbourne Cup twice was a feat not repeated until more than seventy years later when Peter Pan won the race in 1932 and 1934, and winning the Melbourne Cup two years in a row was a feat not repeated until more than 100 years later when Rain Lover won in 1968 and 1969.

De Mestre's plans to run Archer in the third Melbourne Cup in 1863 were upset when, after already having shipped Archer and other horses to Melbourne, the Victoria Turf Club declared that de Mestre's telegraph of acceptance for Archer for the Cup had arrived late and scratched Archer on a technicality. In protest of this decision and in a show of solidarity, all the interstate owners boycotted the third race and scratched their horses in sympathy. What was unknown at the time, however, was that due to injuries Archer would later sustain in the lead up to the Cup it is unlikely that he would have been able to race. As a result, the scratchings the Melbourne Cup of that year ran with only the 7 local Victorian starters, the smallest number in the history of the Cup.

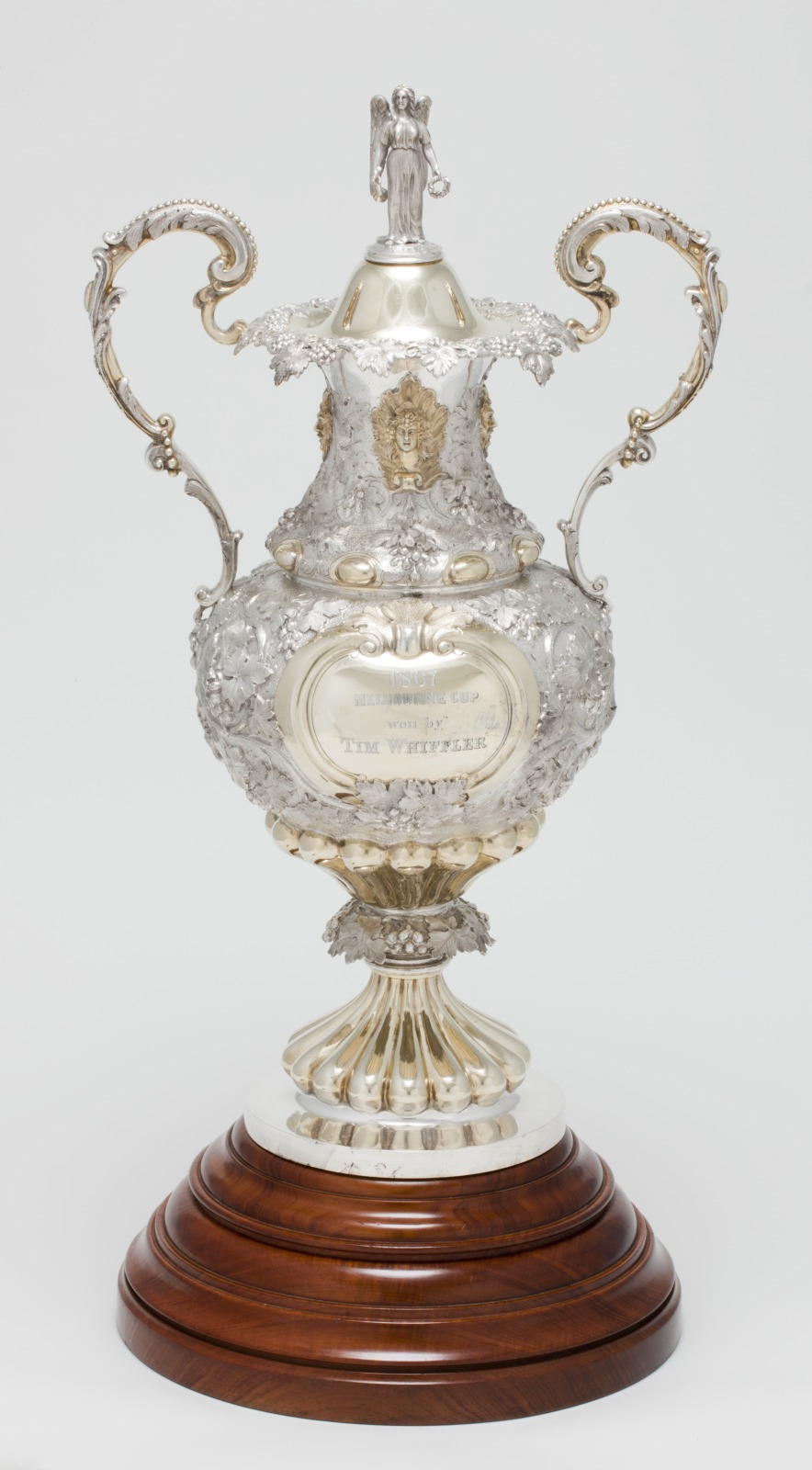
1867 Melbourne Cup won by Tim Whiffler

Following the debacle over the third Melbourne Cup, de Mestre swore that he would never again race in Victoria. But he did. In 1867 he returned to the Melbourne Cup with horses from his stable. He set a new record and won for a third time with a horse that he leased from the owners of Archer, Tim Whiffler. Each year he continued to ship horses to Melbourne to compete in the Melbourne Cup. De Mestre meanwhile built a formidable record in other classic races in Victoria and NSW.

In 1872, de Mestre's rival trainer 'Honest' John Tait beat de Mestre's record and had won four Melbourne Cups. It was not until 1877 that de Mestre was able to match this new record, and not until 1878 that he was able to beat and hold it for the next 99 years.

== Marriage ==
On 27 December 1873, aged 41, Etienne de Mestre married 21-year-old Clara Eliza Rowe (1852–1934), daughter of George Taylor Rowe (1822–1859), at St Matthias's Church, Paddington. Twenty years older than Clara, Etienne had known her since she was a young child and watched her grow up. Together they had eleven children, 10 of whom survived infancy. Their youngest son, Roy de Maistre (1894–1968), born after de Mestre had retired from training, was a successful artist who lived the later part of his life in London where he formed a friendship with novelist Patrick White.

In 1876 de Mestre's entry in the Melbourne Cup, favourite Robin Hood, and ten other horses were lost at sea when the S.S. City of Melbourne was struck by a severe storm off the coast at Jervis Bay.

The loss of Robin Hood did not stop de Mestre from transporting horses by sea to Melbourne to compete in the Melbourne Cup. In the next two years de Mestre won two more Melbourne Cups with Chester in 1877 and Calamia in 1878. Having then won 5 Melbourne Cups established his place in history as Australia's first outstanding racehorse trainer.

With his Melbourne Cup win on Calamia in 1878, De Mestre also equalled his rival John Tait's record set 6 years earlier of owning the winners of 4 Melbourne Cup. However, although 2 of the 3 horses that won these races, Archer and Tim Whiffler, raced in Etienne de Mestre's name, and therefore de Mestre is recorded by history as their owner, they were not actually legally owned by de Mestre. Instead de Mestre leased from the "Exeter Farm", for training and racing purposes both Archer (1861, 1862) and Tim Whiffler (1867). As a lessee de Mestre "owned" and was fully responsible for the horses during the leases, including keeping any of their purses. Archer and Tim Whiffler were leased from Thomas John "Tom" Roberts (a close school-friend of de Mestre), Rowland H. Hassall (Tom's brother-in-law), and Edmund Molyneux Royds and William Edward Royds (Tom's nephews, the sons of Thomas Molyneux Royds who before his death in 1852 had owned Archer's dam and sire). When Archer was retired from racing he was not retained by de Mestre for breeding purposes but was returned to his legal owners at "Exeter Farm".

De Mestre's success as a trainer or an owner were not repeated in the betting ring. He frequently gambled on the wrong runner from his stable, and many times lost to the bookmakers all his considerable stake winnings from a carnival. In 1882, the first year bookmakers were licensed at Flemington, he tried to recoup some of his gambling losses by betting on two of his horses for a VRC Derby-Melbourne Cup double in what is reputed to be the largest single bet ever placed in the Colonies up to that time. After winning the first leg of the bet with Navigator, he scratched this same horse from the Cup as he felt that his other horse Sweet William would be the winner. Injury prior to the race placed Sweet William in 5th place, and de Mestre lost his gamble.

== Later years ==
De Mestre encountered many financial and health problems in the early 1880s; and, at the age of 51, in 1883, his inherited property of "Terara" was auctioned off to pay his debts, and the all-black livery of the Terara stable disappeared from the colonial racing world. Although most successful as owner and trainer, De Mestre had been persuaded to invest heavily in Queensland property, and it was here that he ran into trouble. A severe drought in Queensland, and also on the Shoalhaven, broke him financially. Finally he sold up, and when his health began to fail, friends organised a benefit race meeting for him. It was extremely successful, and the proceeds enabled him to live quietly yet comfortably until his death.

== Death ==
He died at "Garryowen" at Moss Vale on 22 October 1916 at the age of 84, and he was buried in the Church of England cemetery at Bong Bong, New South Wales.

== Sporting achievements ==
Melbourne Cup	1861 (Inaugural), 1862, 1867, 1877, 1878
Sydney Cup	1866 (Inaugural), 1876
Randwick Plate	1867, 1869, 1873, 1874, 1876, 1878
V. R. C. Derby	1875, 1877, 1882
A. J. C. Derby	1864, 1876, 1878, 1882
A.J.C. St Ledger	1865, 1876, 1878, 1883
V.R.C. St Ledger	1883
V.R.C. Queen's Plate	1867
A.J.C. Queen's Plate	1862, 1868, 1870, 1871, 1874, 1876, 1877, 1879
Australian Plate	1859, 1861, 1883
Craven Plate	1867 (Inaugural)
