= Mary Hyde =

Australian business woman (1779–1864)

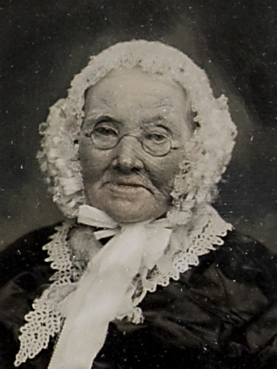
- Born: c. 19 February 1779; Halesowen, Worcestershire, England
- Died: 1 December 1864 (aged 85) "Banks House", Botany, Sydney, Australia
- Other names: Mary Hide, alias Sarah Blunn; Mary Black; Mary Lord
- Spouse(s): Simeon Lord (1771–1840), and her earlier partner was Captain John Black (1778–1802)
- Children: 2 children with John Black: John Henry Black (1799–1867) Mary Ann De Mestre nee Black (1801–1861) 8 children with Simeon Lord: Sarah Ann Ramsay nee Lord (1806–1889); Louisa Dick nee Lord (born 1808, date of death unknown); Simeon Lord Jnr. (1810–1892); Francis Lord (1812–1897); Edward Lord (1814–1884); Thomas Lord (1816–1876); George William Lord (1818–1880) Robert Charles Lord (1821–1857)
- Parent(s): Edward Hyde and Sarah Blunn

Mary Lord née Hyde (c. 19 February 1779 – 1 December 1864) was an English Australian woman who in the period 1855 to 1859 sued the Commissioners of the City of Sydney and won compensation for the sum of over £15,600 (plus costs) for the inundation of her property at Botany.

Hyde is noted for her pertinacity. Despite in late 1855 partially winning her case through the New South Wales courts, Mary appealed and three years later in early 1859 won fully after taking her case as far as the Privy Council in England, the final court of appeal then available to a British subject living in the Colony of New South Wales.

In 1859, in the 70-year-old Colony of New South Wales, her court case, although largely ignored by historians, was nevertheless an achievement: women did not have the vote; and Hyde lived in a male-dominated society governed by British law where women had little power. Married women had no power at all, and Mary was only able to sue as, being a widow, she was no longer married.

Having experienced life as a woman in Victorian society, single, married and widowed, Mary became concerned with what today would be called a feminist issue. She stipulated in her will that any bequests made to her daughters and granddaughters were to be given to them in their own right and that their husbands should not have any say. She attempted to give her daughters and granddaughters control over their own inheritances. The law of the day overrode her stated wishes. Prior to the Married Woman's Property Act 1882 (a rallying point for many first-wave feminists, passed after years of intense political lobbying) in England and similar colonial legislation, a married woman could not independently own property, and had no distinct legal personality. Any property that she had owned as a single woman, or that she inherited as a married woman whether in goods, money, or land, passed into the ownership of her husband.

== Life ==
Hyde was born in Halesowen, Worcestershire, England in 1779, the eldest child of Edward Hyde and Sarah Blunn. Mary also had a younger brother John who was born two years later.

After being transported to Sydney as a teenage convict, Mary became the unmarried partner of Captain John Black (1778–1802) the privateer (state-sanctioned pirate), whaler, ship's captain, navigator and master mariner who named King Island; and later the wife of Simeon Lord (1771–1840) a wealthy entrepreneurial emancipist merchant and magistrate.

=== Convict ===
In November 1795, at the age of 16, Mary was accused of stealing items of clothing from Francis Deakin, her employer, including 1 black silk cloak, 1 muslin shawl, 1 cotton gown, 1 dimity petticoat, 2 pair of cotton stockings and 1 pair of scissors. On 21 March 1796, at the age of 17, Mary, who also used her mother’s name as an alias, was sentenced at the Warwickshire Assizes to seven years' transportation to New South Wales for theft. She was not transported until 1798.

On 18 July 1798 Mary arrived in Sydney, one of 95 female convicts on board the Britannia, a whaling ship that had also previously brought convicts to Sydney in May 1797. Females were in short supply in the colony, and competition for the newly arrived female convicts on that day was described by David Collins in An Account of the English Colony in New South Wales as like a cattle auction. The lot of the women who arrived that day was to be a servant or a "wife" to a stranger, or a hut-keeper for convict males at Parramatta for those who would not go with one man. As Mary stayed in Sydney, it can only be assumed that she was initially chosen by one of the men in the "cattle auction" on board the deck of the Britannia II.

=== Relationship with John Black ===
In August 1798, when they were both 19 years old, Mary met John Black, a ship's officer who had survived the mutiny on the Lady Shore in 1797, and who that month had arrived in Sydney on board the Indispensable. Mary came under John’s "protection" and fell pregnant almost immediately, and they went on to have two children. Mary, however, was often "keeping the home fires burning" as John was away for months at a time either whaling or otherwise working his trade as a ship's captain. The longest time that Mary got to spend with Black was from 11 January 1801 to 1 January 1802, when he entered into the liquor trade and established a shop on his leased land.

On 31 May 1799, Mary gave birth at home to her first child, John Henry Black (1799–1867). Home since March had been on land leased from the government by John Black, near what is now De Mestre Place in Sydney, on the eastern side of George Street, between Hunter Street and Martin Place. Three days after the birth Black again sailed, and Mary was left to care for her newborn alone until he next returned. John Black's business saw him sailing in and out of the port of Sydney, and their child was not baptised until he was three months old.

In 1800 it was recorded that ‘'Mary Hide(sic) and her son were off the'’ (government) ‘'stores'’. This was because Mary "living on the lease of Mr. Black; and owning 7 sheep, 4 pigs and 3 goats" had been able to meet a level of self-sufficiency, something the government greatly encouraged in an effort to cut costs.

On 7 September 1801, Governor Philip Gidley King granted Mary Hyde an Absolute Pardon, eighteen months before her sentence would have expired.

Back in January 1801, when John Black had returned to Sydney from one of his long voyages, Mary Hyde became pregnant with their second child. Mary Ann Black was born at home on 1 October 1801.

On 1 January 1802, after being home for nearly 12 months, Black sailed for Bombay (now Mumbai) and then Calcutta (now Kolkata) in the Fly. Mary was left at home as the sole parent of two children under the age of three, and one only 3 months old. Then in about May 1802, on the return voyage from Kolkata, John Black's ship was lost at sea with all hands. News did not reach Sydney until 12 months later, in May 1803, that Black's ship was missing, but Black's death was not confirmed until April 1804. Mary was not left completely destitute when Black sailed in January 1802. She had the house and shop on the land leased in Black's name, and what remained of the money and supplies that Black had left behind before he had sailed.

=== Relationship with Simeon Lord ===
About 1805 Hyde began a new relationship with a business associate of her late partner. He was the former convict, and one of early Sydney's great characters, businessman Simeon Lord, who in addition to becoming a magistrate also happened to be one of the most litigious men in the colony. Simeon Lord knew both Mary and her previous partner through trading dealings involving Black’s ships whose goods had been stored in his warehouse. Simeon Lord became step-father to Mary's two children. Simeon also brought into the relationship a nearly teenage adopted daughter, the orphan of two convicts who had died before she was 4 years old. In 1806 Lord's adopted daughter married one of his business partners when she was no more than 14 years old. Also in 1806 Mary's first child to Lord was born. Mary and Simeon went on to have 8 children of their own over the next 15 years. With investments in Lord's name, they also became one of the richest couples in the Colony of New South Wales, with only six Sydney residents having greater landholdings.

In 1807 Mary sent her daughter, Mary Ann, to England with Simeon Lord's adopted daughter Joanna and her husband Francis Williams, to be placed into the care of the child's grandfather, Reverend John Black. In February 1807 the then five-year-old left on board Lord's ship the Commerce, but the ship returned to Sydney in April 1807 after picking up shipwrecked men, and sustaining damage in a storm. In July 1807 her daughter was baptised at St Philip's Church, Sydney. Then in November 1807 her daughter began the voyage to England for a second time aboard another of Lord's ships, the Sydney Cove. Young Mary Ann Black did not return to Australia until 1814 after her grandfather's death.

Mary Hyde married her partner Simeon Lord on 27 October 1814 at St Philip's Church, Sydney. Their fifth child was only one week old. A witness to the wedding was William Charles Wentworth, the son of magistrate and family friend D'arcy Wentworth.

In the 1820s the family moved from their 'city' home in Macquarie Place, Sydney, to their 'country' home in Botany, nearer to the site of their factory.

=== Widow ===
When her husband Simeon Lord died in 1840, Mary had a mourning brooch made containing her husband's woven hair in a gold setting with a border of half-pearls. Simeon, the legal holder of the couple's wealth, had died an "immensely wealthy man". Under the terms of the will, Mary, a woman, was made executor of the estate. Lord's estate was divided between his wife and 8 children, the youngest of whom was 18. Mary became one of the wealthiest women in the colony. Hyde then lived about another 24 years as a widow, and continued to reside in the family home until her death.

After her husband's death, in addition to managing large livestock and landholdings, Mary continued the manufacturing business in the factory at Botany. She employed many local people in the milling and dressing of cloth, and in the making of hats, stockings, leather, shoes, candles and harnesses, until the business had to be closed due to the flooding of part of her Botany property and the loss of the stream which drove the mill.

Beginning in 1855, in litigation worthy of her late husband, Mary sued the Commissioners of the City of Sydney. In July 1855, by notification in the Government Gazette of Colonial Act of the 17 Vic, No. 33, entitled "An Act for supplying the City of Sydney, and portions of the Suburbs thereof, with Water", approximately 30 hectares (75 acres) were resumed for a reserve for a water supply for Sydney. The land resumed included land owned by Mary on which her woollen mill stood. Compensation was offered, but the amount offered was disputed as unreasonable. Under the Colonial Act, questions of disputed compensation were tried in the form of an action brought against the Commissioners. In order to gain reasonable compensation for this resumption the then 76-year-old Mary took the Commissioners of the City of Sydney to the Supreme Court of New South Wales. "For thirty one and a half acres [12.7 ha], with a mill, a dwelling-house, some outbuildings, and water privileges, Mrs. Mary Lord claimed £30,000." In December 1855, in the third and last action taken by residents whose land had been resumed, she partially won her case.

The two cases that were heard before Mary's case, and which had established Mary's right to compensation for the deprivation of her land, buildings, and enough water to provide the motive power to run her mill, were Darvall V. The City Commissioners that was heard by Mr. Justice Dickinson in October 1855, and Edward Lord V. The City Commissioners that was heard by Mr. Justice Dickinson in November 1855. For the loss of 4.9 hectares (12 acres) and buildings the jury returned a verdict for Darvall of damages of £3,200; and contingent damages of £800 in the event of the plaintiff establishing at law his claim to the use of water. Mr. Justice Dickinson ruled that plaintiff, having no mill that was deprived of its motive power, was not entitled to damages to the use of the water, but that this could only be decided by a decision by the full court, on appeal. For the loss of 4.5 hectares (11 acres) and buildings and the motive power of water to his mill, the jury returned a verdict for Edward Lord of damages for £11,000; and contingent damages of £4,000 for the loss of water for other purposes than those of his mill, namely, for possible wool washing, and other purposes. Mr. Justice Dickinson ruled that the use of the water for possible wool washing was incompatible with the terms of the original land grant, but that this could only be decided by a decision by the full court, on appeal.

Held over two days, Mary's case included the special jury of twelve travelling from the court house to Botany to view the land that had been resumed. Unquestioned was Mary's right to compensation for the deprivation of her land, buildings, and enough water to provide the motive power to run her mill. The jury assessed the damages for these at £11,460. What was still in question was her right for damages for the deprivation of water for other purposes like the use of her machinery. The jury, under instructions from the judge Mr. Justice Dickinson, assessed contingent damages for the loss of additional water usage at another £7,200 – but only if Mary had been entitled to the undisturbed use of the water that, previous to the resumption by the Commissioners of the City of Sydney, had been flowing from the land further upstream owned by her son Edward Lord. As in the previous cases, whether Mary had been entitled to the undisturbed use of the water was something that Mr. Justice Dickinson ruled could only be decided by a decision by the full court, on appeal.

The amount of damages of £11,460 awarded to Hyde were reduced after further action by the Commissioners. They did not question the amount of damages on the land and buildings that had been awarded against them, but they did question the amount of damages on the water for the motive power for the mill. The Supreme Court directed a new trial unless Mary agreed to reduce the amount of the damages that she had been awarded, to which she consented. The fight was not yet over, however, as there was still the issue of the contingent damages of £7,200 to which she believed she was entitled.

Showing her pertinacity, Mary appealed her case to the Privy Council in England, the final court of appeal then available to a British subject living in the Colony of New South Wales. The judgment of the Lords of the Judicial Committee of the Privy Council on the appeal of Mary Lord v. Commissioners for the City of Sydney was delivered on 12 February 1859, after Mary had turned 80 years of age. News of the verdict took over two months to reach Australia, but Mary had been awarded the final £7,200 and her costs. Lord Kingsdown (Judge of the Admiralty Court), Lord Justice Knight Bruce, Sir Edward Ryan, and Sir John Taylor Coleridge had decided, despite contrary arguments from the defendants, that Mary had been entitled to the undisturbed use of the water on her land that had been resumed, and that she was entitled to the extra £7,200 compensation. Her total compensation as a result of the court actions was now over £15,600.

Historical research would need to be done to establish if Mary has an even more important place in Australian history. Due to the prohibitive circumstances under which Australian women were living legally and socially, and that for anyone living in Australia prior to or during the Victorian era it was expensive and geographically difficult to appeal a case in England, Mary is perhaps the first, and possibly only, female and/or female convict, to have taken a legal case from New South Wales to the Privy Council.

=== Death ===
Hyde died on 1 December 1864 at the age of 85 in the family home of "Banks House" (named after Sir Joseph Banks) at Botany. She was the matriarch of a large, notable, Australian family, and had already settled large amounts of her estate on her children before she died. Probate of her remaining estate was granted on 24 August 1865 and was valued at £11,000. In her will she named all her ten children, although some had predeceased her. Mary was also specifically concerned for her daughters and granddaughters. She stipulated that any bequests made to her daughters and granddaughters were to be given to them in their own right and that their husbands should not have any say. She attempted to give her daughters and granddaughters control over their own inheritances. The law of the day overrode her stated wishes. Remembering that colonies in Australia were largely governed by English law, prior to the English 1887 Married Woman's Property Act a married woman could own no property, and was the chattel of her husband. Any property that she had owned as a single woman, or that she inherited as a married woman whether in goods, money, or land, passed into the ownership of her husband.

Hyde's sons became well known in public life. One of them, George William Lord (1818–1880), a pastoralist, was elected to the first New South Wales Legislative Assembly in 1856, and transferred to the legislative council in 1877. He was colonial treasurer in the third Martin ministry from December 1870 to May 1872. Her eldest son to Simeon Lord, Simeon Lord Jnr. (1810–1892), was a pastoralist in Tasmania and Queensland. Another son, Francis Lord (1812–1897), was a member of parliament for many years, and a third son, Edward Lord (1814–1884), became city treasurer at Sydney and mayor of St Leonards. Her eldest son John Henry Black (1799–1867) later became the first manager of the Bank of New South Wales. One of her sons-in-law was another successful merchant in Sydney, Prosper de Mestre (1789–1844) who married her daughter Mary Ann Black (1801–1861).

An ambrotype photographic portrait of Mary Hyde (Mrs Simeon Lord), in its case, and taken sometime in the period 1845–1860, is in the collection of the Powerhouse Museum in Sydney.
