= List of acts of the First Legislative Council of New South Wales =

This is a list of acts of the Legislative Council of the Colony of New South Wales which was established by the New South Wales Act 1823 (4 Geo. 4. c. 96. (Imp.))

The numbers after the titles of the acts are chapter numbers. Acts before 1897 were referenced using the 'Year of reign' of the reigning monarch, an abbreviation for the name of the 'Monarch', and a "c" number being a 'Chapter number' – e.g. 7 Geo IV c. 2 – to define a chapter of the appropriate statute book.

Since 1897, acts have been consequently numbered from 1 each year, so that the first act of 1897 was "Act 1 of 1897".

Note: This is a work in progress.

== First Council ==
First session - 25 August 1824 – 22 November 1825

- 5 Geo IV No. 1 Currency Act 28 September 1824
- 5 Geo IV No. 2 An Act to stay Proceedings against the Governor 31 August 1824
- 5 Geo IV No. 3 Felons Absconding Act 11 January 1825
- 6 Geo IV No. 4 Spirits Licence Act 1 February 1825
- 6 Geo IV No. 5 Felons Punishment Act 8 February 1825
- 6 Geo IV No. 6 Spirits Licence Act 15 February 1825
- 6 Geo IV No. 7 Spirits Licence Act 22 February 1825
- 6 Geo IV No. 8 Insolvent Debtors Act 29 March 1825
- 6 Geo IV No. 9 Justices of the Peace Act 29 March 1825
- 6 Geo IV No. 10 Harbours Act 1 February 1825
- 6 Geo IV No. 11 Acts of Council Confirming Act. 31 May 1825
- 6 Geo IV No. 12 Spirits Licence Act. 31 May 1825
- 6 Geo IV No. 13 Naturalization (Timothy Goodwin Pitman) Act 21 June 1825
- 6 Geo IV No. 14 Customs Duties Act. 10 August 1825
- 6 Geo IV No. 15 Hulks and Gaols Act. 10 August 1825
- 6 Geo IV No. 16 An Act to appoint a Judge of the Supreme Court. 17 August 1825
- 6 Geo IV No. 17 Naturalization (Prosper de Mestre) Act. 30 August 1825
- 6 Geo IV No. 18 Justices of the Peace Act. 5 October 1825
- 6 Geo IV No. 19 Fines and Penalties Act. 1 November 1825
- 6 Geo IV No. 20 Toll Duties Act. 11 October 1825
- 6 Geo IV No. 21 Registration of Births, Deaths and Marriages Act. 25 October 1825
- 6 Geo IV No. 22 An Act for the Registration of Deeds and barring Dower. 15 November 1825
- 6 Geo IV No. 23 Postage Act. 22 November 1825

== Second Council ==
First session - 20 December 1825 – 16 August 1826

- 7 Geo IV No. 1 Hulk and Gaols Act 17 February 1826
- 7 Geo IV No. 2 Spirits License Act 17 February 1826
- 7 Geo IV No. 3 Currency Act 11 July 1826
- 7 Geo IV No. 4 Orphan School Estates and Apprenticeship Act 11 July 1826
- 7 Geo IV No. 5 Felons Punishment Act 11 July 1826

Second session - 26 February 1827 – 31 December 1827

- 8 Geo IV No. 1 Spirits Licences Act 26 February 1827
- 8 Geo IV No. 2 Printing Act 24 April 1827
- 8 Geo IV No. 3 Newspaper Duty Act 24 April 1827
- 8 Geo IV No. 4 Bank of Australia Act 23 August 1826 (Bill) and 26 February 1827 (Act)
- 8 Geo IV No. 5 Printing Act 3 May 1827

Third session - 19 March 1828 – 28 October 1828

- 9 Geo IV No. 1 An Act to Adopt certain Acts of Parliament 19 March 1828
- 9 Geo IV No. 2 An Act to Adopt a certain Act of Parliament 19 March 1828
- 9 Geo IV No. 3 Bank of New South Wales Act 19 March 1828
- 9 Geo IV No. 4 Census Act 19 March 1828
- 9 Geo IV No. 5 Hulks and Gaols Act 30 June 1828
- 9 Geo IV No. 6 Denization Act 30 June 1828
- 9 Geo IV No. 7 Gunpowder Act 30 June 1828
- 9 Geo IV No. 8 Apprentices Act 17 July 1828
- 9 Geo IV No. 9 Masters and Servants Act 10 July 1828
- 9 Geo IV No. 10 Felons Dealing Act 16 July 1828
- 9 Geo IV No. 11 Pounds Act 10 July 1828
- 9 Geo IV No. 12 Fences Act 2 August 1828
- 9 Geo IV No. 13 Auction Licenses Act 2 August 1828
- 9 Geo IV No. 14 Theatrical Licenses Act 1 September 1828

Fourth session - 16 February 1829 – 20 February 1829

- 10 Geo IV No. 1 Quarter Sessions and Justices of the Peace Act 16 February 1829
- 10 Geo IV No. 2 Court of Requests Act 19 February 1829

== Third Council ==
First session - 21 August 1829 – 15 October 1829

- 10 Geo IV No. 3 Requests Courts Act 25 August 1829
- 10 Geo IV No. 4 School of Industry Act 25 August 1829
- 10 Geo IV No. 5 Female Felons Factory Act 25 August 1829
- 10 Geo IV No. 6 Church and School, and Crown Lands Act 25 August 1829
- 10 Geo IV No. 7 Quarter Sessions Act 3 September 1829
- 10 Geo IV No. 8 Juries Act 2 September 1829

Second session 18 January 1830 – 20 May 1830

- 10 Geo IV No. 9 An Act declaring the Emancipation Act in force 18 January 1830
- 11 Geo IV No. 1 Printing Act 18 January 1830
- 11 Geo IV No. 2 Juries Act 18 January 1830
- 11 Geo IV No. 3 Requests Courts Act 18 January 1830
- 11 Geo IV No. 4 Slaughtering of Cattle Act 25 August 1829
- 11 Geo IV No. 5 Spirits Licenses Act 15 March 1830
- 11 Geo IV No. 7 Insolvent Debtors Act 18 January 1830
- 11 Geo IV No. 8 Dog Act 15 March 1830
- 11 Geo IV No. 9 Customs Duties Act 2 April 1830
- 11 Geo IV No. 10 Felons Absconding Act 21 April 1830
- 11 Geo IV No. 11 Public Houses and Spirits Licenses Act 24 March 1830
- 11 Geo IV No. 12 Felons Punishment Act 15 March 1830
- 11 Geo IV No. 13 Quarter Sessions and Justices of the Peace Act 6 May 1830

Third session - 20 September 1831 – 8 November 1831

- 2 Wm IV No. 1 Printing Act. Mss numbered Act. Printed Act 20 September 1831
- 2 Wm IV No. 2 American Spirits Duties Act. Printed Act 20 September 1831

Fourth session - 19 January 1832 – 13 October 1832

- 2 Wm IV No. 3 Juries Act. Mss bill (2 drafts) 19 January 1832
- 2 Wm IV No. 4 Governor and Judges Salary Act. 24 January 1832
- 2 Wm IV No. 6 Currency Act. 24 January 1832
- 2 Wm IV No. 7 Foreign Attachment Act. 19 January 1832
- 2 Wm IV No. 8 Dog Act. 15 February 1832
- 2 Wm IV No. 9 Felons Absconding Act. Act 20 February 1832
- 2 Wm IV No. 10 Masters and Seamen Act. 1 February 1832
- 2 Wm IV No. 11 Insolvent Debtors Act. 20 January 1832
- 2 Wm IV No. 12 Toll Duties Act. 10 February 1832
- 2 Wm IV No. 13 Savings Bank Act. 20 February 1832
- 2 Wm IV No. 14 Customs Affirmations Act. 20 February 1832
- 2 Wm IV No. 16 Market Tolls Act. Mss bill. 6 March 1832
- 2 Wm IV No. 17 Appropriation Act. 16 March 1832
- 3 Wm IV No. 1 Quarantine Act. 26 July 1832
- 3 Wm IV No. 3 Quarter Sessions and Justices of the Peace Act. 17 July 1832
- 3 Wm IV No. 4 Weights and Measures Act. 12 July 1832
- 3 Wm IV No. 5 Scab in Sheep Act. 9 March 1832
- 3 Wm IV No. 6 Harbours and Rivers Act. 2 August 1832
- 3 Wm IV No. 7 Appropriation Act. 11 October 1832
