= Simeon Lord =

Australian businessman (1771 - 1840)

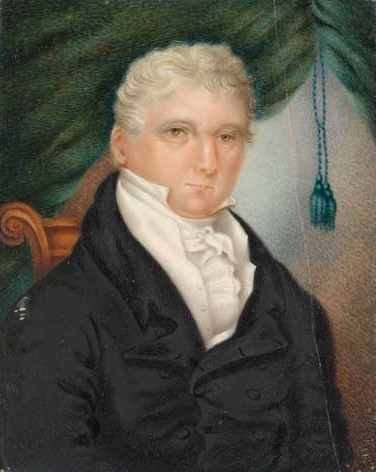
- Simeon Lord
- Born: c. 28 January 1771; Dobroyd (near Todmorden), Yorkshire, England
- Died: 29 January 1840 (aged 69) "Banks House", Botany, Sydney, Australia
- Burial place: Devonshire Street Cemetery
- Occupations: Merchant, auctioneer, publican & magistrate
- Spouse: Mary Hyde (1779–1864)
- Children: 1 adopted child, 2 step-children, 8 children with Mary Hyde (including George Lord)

Simeon Lord (c. 28 January 1771 – 29 January 1840) was a pioneer merchant and a magistrate in Australia. He became a prominent trader in Sydney, buying and selling ship cargoes. Despite being an emancipist, Lord was made a magistrate by Governor Lachlan Macquarie, and he became a frequent guest at Government House.

His business dealings were extensive; he became one of Sydney's wealthiest men. He was at various times a retailer, auctioneer, sealer, pastoralist, timber merchant and manufacturer. He is mentioned in many Australian history books, in particular regarding his emancipist status.

== Background ==
Lord, the fourth child of ten children of Simeon Lord and Ann Fielden of Dobroyd (near Todmorden), Yorkshire, England, was born about 28 January 1771. On 22 April 1790, as a 19-year-old, he was convicted to 7 years transportation at the Manchester Quarter Sessions in Lancashire for the theft of 21 pieces of cloth, 100 yards (91 m) of calico and 100 yards (91 m) of muslin. Lord was then transported to New South Wales as part of the Third Fleet on board the Atlantic. He arrived in Sydney on 20 August 1791, and the convict lad was assigned to Captain Thomas Rowley of the New South Wales Corps.

== Businessman ==
Lord developed many business interests in the colony, and became one of Sydney's wealthiest men. Lord's first known business venture was to run a drinking house, and he purchased a license for it in 1798 for £5, after his sentence had expired. The drinking house was documented as being called "The Swan", but when he renewed the license, for a further £5 in 1799, the name was documented as being The Black Swan. Simeon also signed as surety on James Squire's establishment called The Malting Shovel in 1799. In 1801 it was reported that "Simeon Lord sells rum at 32/- a gallon" ... "these are Governor Kings regulations for the benefit of the Colony while American ships who would be glad to sell their liquor at 5/-, 6/- or 7/- per G. are turned away!". With help from the government like this, it is no wonder that Lord prospered.

In a few years Lord had established a general merchandise and agency business, and in 1800 with a partner purchased a brig the Anna Josepha while partnered with shipwright James Underwood. He also became an auctioneer and prospered, a return made in 1804 said that the "estimated value of commercial articles imported from abroad in the hands of Simeon Lord and other dealers was £15,000". Though his position was not comparable with that of Robert Campbell, it is clear that already he was one of the leading merchants of Sydney. His business was on the site of the corner of Bridge Street and Macquarie Place. In 1807 Governor William Bligh spoke adversely about his business dealings with the masters of ships, and Judge Field several years later spoke in a similar way. Aspersions of this kind against members of the emancipist class at this period must, however, be accepted with caution. No doubt Lord was a keen business man well able to look after his own interests, but he also had enterprise and courage, valuable qualities in the developing colony.

About 1805 Lord began a relationship with Mary Hyde (1779–1864), a convict who had arrived in Australia in 1798. Mary already had two children from a previous relationship with a business associate of Lord's, the deceased privateer (state-sanctioned pirate) and ship's officer Captain John Black, and Lord became their stepfather. He and Mary went on to have 8 children of their own over the next 15 years.

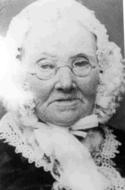
Simeon Lord's wife Mary Hyde in old age

Also in 1805 Lord went into partnership with Henry Kable and James Underwood. One of their first ventures was joint ownership of King George the first locally owned and built vessel to go whaling. But their association ended in legal disputes in the courts of New South Wales, as did many of Lord's ventures. Lord was immensely litigious, and his affairs also took up a large percentage of the early appeals from the Colony of New South Wales to the Privy Council in England. The records of the Privy Council indicate that his opponents may have had good grounds for arguing that he used the Privy Council as a means of warding off his creditors rather than in a genuine attempt to test the legality of judgments against him. In his partnership with Kable and Underwood he was active in developing the sealing boom at the Antipodes Islands to the south and east of New Zealand's South Island in 1805 to 1807.

Before Lord had begun his relationship with Mary Hyde, he had adopted the orphan Joanna Short (1792–1841). Joanna was the orphan of convicts Elizabeth Drury (died 1793) and Joseph Short (died 1795). In 1806 Simeon's adopted daughter, who was no more than 14, married Francis Williams, a business partner of Lord's, and the couple travelled together to London on business for Lord in 1807. On the ship with Joanna he sent Mary Hyde's 6-year-old daughter Mary Ann Black into the care of her grandfather Reverend John Black in England.

Lord was engaged in trade with New Zealand, and in 1809 had the misfortune to lose a valuable cargo of sealskins in the events surrounding the Boyd massacre. He had chartered the 'Boyd' and sent it to New Zealand to complete its cargo with a consignment of spars. The captain flogged a Māori chief for alleged misbehaviour, and in consequence the vessel was raided and looted, nearly everyone on board being killed. In spite of this disaster, Lord joined in an attempt to obtain a monopoly to establish a flax plantation in New Zealand, and manufacture canvas and cordage from it in Sydney. The monopoly was, however, not granted and Lord turned his hands to other things. He employed a man to experiment in dyes and tanning, and was the first to weave with Australian wool. He succeeded in weavings coarse cloths, blankets and stockings and also made hats.

Long before this, in May 1810, Lord was made a magistrate and he became a frequent guest at Government House. Governor Lachlan Macquarie in his dispatch to Viscount Castlereagh stating his intention to make Lord a magistrate described him as "an opulent merchant". He was, however, a man of little education, and when John Bigge was making his investigations in 1819–20, the alleged unsuitability of Lord for his position was used as a stick to beat Macquarie. Lord soon afterwards resigned and appears to have been less prosperous in his business for a period.

On 27 October 1814, at St Philip's Church, Sydney Lord married his partner of many years, Mary Hyde. The marriage was held when their fifth child was only one week old. A witness to the wedding was William Wentworth, the son of the family friend D'Arcy Wentworth.

In the 1820s Lord concentrated on pastoral and manufacturing interests. He also succeeded in compounding a claim for land resumed for public purposes in Sydney, by accepting in 1828 a large grant of land in the country. He did not come into public notice after this.

Lord became a large landholder during his lifetime, of both land he purchased himself, and of land grants. Lord's extensive land holdings included land at Petersham, Botany Bay and Tasmania.

Lord died "an immensely wealthy man" at the age of 69 on 29 January 1840 in the family home of "Banks House" at Botany.

== Legacy ==
Lord's sons also became well known in public life. One of them, George (1818–1880), a pastoralist, was elected to the first New South Wales Legislative Assembly in 1856, and transferred to the legislative council in 1877. George was colonial treasurer in the third Martin ministry from December 1870 to May 1872. His eldest son Simeon Jnr. (1810–1892) was a pastoralist in Tasmania and Queensland. Another son, Francis (1812–1897), was a member of parliament for many years, and a third son, Edward (1814–1884), became city treasurer at Sydney and mayor of St Leonards. His stepson John Henry Black (1799–1867) later became the first manager of the Bank of New South Wales. One of his sons-in-law was another successful merchant in Sydney, Prosper de Mestre (1789–1844) who married his stepdaughter Mary Ann Black (1801–1861).
