= Fly (brig) =

Fly was a brig of 100 tons that sailed from Calcutta, India, on 14 May 1802 bound for Sydney, New South Wales. She was carrying a cargo of 4,000 imperial gallons (18,184 L; 4,804 US gal) of spirits and was commanded by John Black. She was never heard of again. At the time of her disappearance she was owned by the House of Campbells, Calcutta.
