= Archer (horse) =

Australian-bred Thoroughbred racehorse

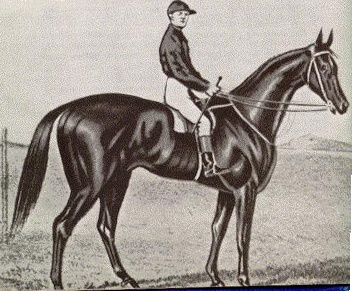
- Photograph c 1861
- Sire: William Tell (GB)
- Grandsire: Touchstone
- Dam: Maid Of The Oaks
- Damsire: Vagabond (GB)
- Sex: Stallion
- Foaled: 1856; Exeter Farm; Jembaicumbene near Braidwood, New South Wales, Australia
- Country: Australia
- Colour: Bay
- Breeder: Thomas John Roberts & Rowland H. Hassall
- Owner: Thomas John Roberts (1831-1899), Rowland H. Hassall (1820-1904), & the Estate of Thomas Molyneux Royds (1824-1852) whose beneficiaries were Edmund Molyneux Royds (1847-1912), & William Edward Royds (1849-1910); Lessee for racing purposes Etienne de Mestre (1832-1916)
- Trainer: Etienne de Mestre
- Record: 17-12-0-3

Major wins
- Randwick Plate (1860 & 1861); Stewards Purse (1860); Australian Plate (1861); Maitland Town Plate (1861); Melbourne Cup (1861 & 1862); Melbourne Town Plate (1861); AJC Queens Plate (1862); All-Aged Stakes (1862)

Honours
- Australian Racing Hall of Fame (2017)

Archer (1856–1872) was an Australian Thoroughbred racehorse who won the first and the second Melbourne Cups in 1861 and 1862. He won both Cups easily, and is one of only five horses to win the Melbourne Cup twice or more and is one of only four horses to win successive Cups. In 2017 Archer was inducted to the Australian Racing Hall of Fame.

== Breeding ==
Archer was sired by the successful imported sire William Tell (GB) (1843, by Touchstone); his dam, Maid of the Oaks (dam of Mariner and William Tell (1855)) was by Vagabond (GB) (by Cain). Archer's sire and dam had been owned by Thomas Molyneux "Tom" Royds (1824–1852) of Ballalaba, (described as being near Jembaicumbene, which was then a major settlement), New South Wales. Royds formed a breeding partnership with his uncle-in-law Andrew Badgery (c.1804–1857), keeping their many horses on the Andrew Badgery managed Exeter Farm in Jembaicumbene. For £51, Royds purchased the mare Maid Of The Oaks at the dispersal of Charles Smith's Clifton Stud in 1845. Royds also imported the stallion Sailor By The Sea, and in February 1847 the stallion William Tell. Archer's full-sister, Our Nell, won three races in four days at the Goulburn races (1855) and other races at city tracks.

== Early life ==
Archer was probably foaled in 1856 at Exeter Farm in Jembaicumbene, near Braidwood in New South Wales. In recent years evidence has been discovered that Archer may not have been foaled on the Exeter Farm owned by Roberts but on Royds' previous cattle farm Ballalaba, owned by Hassall. This is supported by Richard William Royds' (1922–?) (one of William Edward Royd's grandsons) writing in 1983 that Archer was foaled at Ballalaba; this view is supported by his widow and adopted son. All other references state that Archer was foaled at Exeter Farm, including Richard's older brother John Patrick Molyneux Royds (1920–?) in an interview published in 1969. It is also on Exeter Farm that other horses from the breeding partnership of Hassall and Roberts were foaled, including Archer's half-brother Mariner in 1854 (by Sailor By The Sea out of Maid Of The Oaks) and his full-brother William Tell in 1855 (by William Tell (GB) out of Maid Of The Oaks.

Royds died at age 27 in an accident in early 1852. Two years later, his widow Elizabeth Jane "Betsy" Royds (née Roberts) (1824–1875) married Rowland H. Hassall (1820–1904) of Durham Hall in Jembaicumben who, under the laws of the time, obtained all of Betsy's possessions at their marriage. Even though Royds' will gave him no right to do so, Hassall began selling off the Royds horses at Exeter Farm. Betsy persuaded Hassell to keep the imported stallion William Tell and six broodmares (one of which was Maid Of The Oaks). Her brother Thomas John "Tom" Roberts (1831–1899) had inherited Exeter Farm, and as executor of Royds' estate was trying to protect the interests of his nephews; he would care for the horses. As part of the agreement, the progeny (including Archer) from the breeding program using the six mares bred to William Tell and other stallions were recorded in the stud books under the breeding partnership name of (RH) Hassell and (TJ) Roberts. The names of the two boys to whom the horses had been bequeathed, Edmund Molyneux Royds (1847–1912) (no issue) and William Edward Royds (1849–1910), were not mentioned. When the boys sued their stepfather in the 1870s their interests were finally recognised, and the breeding partnership was renamed Hassell, Roberts and Royds.

Newspaper archives of the day state that Archer travelled south from Sydney to Port Melbourne on the steamboat the City of Sydney with two of his trainer Etienne de Mestre's other horses Exeter and Inheritor, leaving on 18 September 1861 and arriving at Port Melbourne on 21 September. Prior to the Melbourne trip, the horses had arrived in Sydney by steamer from Greenwell Point (near Nowra) on 9 September. Passengers on the City of Sydney included de Mestre and Archer's jockey, John Cutts. Archer travelled by steamboat from Sydney to Melbourne all three times that he raced in Victoria (in 1861, 1862 and 1863). Before railway facilities linked Melbourne to the other states, the only way to transport horses from state to state was by boat. In 1876 de Mestre's entry in the Melbourne Cup, Robin Hood, and ten other horses were lost at sea when the City Of Melbourne was struck by a severe storm off the coast at Jervis Bay.

A steamboat was also the vehicle that de Mestre used to get his horses (including Archer) to Sydney. His horses usually boarded a steamer at Adam's Whalf {near Terara) but due to floods in early 1860 impeding navigation, from 1860 to 1863 the horses walked eight miles (13 km) to Berry's Whalf at Greenwell Point. When horses could not be transported by steamboat, and where railway lines did not exist, trainers needed to have their horses walked and/or ridden to their destinations. In order to race at Windsor Archer would have been sent by steamship or rail from Sydney to Parramatta and overland the last 21 miles (34 km), and in order to race at Maitland Archer would have been sent by steamship to Newcastle and overland the last 20 miles (32 km). The longest distance that Archer would have walked or been ridden was 155 miles (249 km) from the end of the railway line in Campbelltown to Jembaicumbene when he retired from racing in 1864.

Another Archer story is that his jockey for the first two Melbourne Cups, John Cutts (c. 1829 – 1872), was an Aborigine. Johnny Cutts was (according to legend) born in the area around Nowra, and one of many Aboriginal men who replaced white stockmen who walked off the land to join the gold rush. In truth Johnny Cutts rode for many trainers in his long career as a jockey, was not from the Nowra area, and was never based there. Cutts' brother-in-law Walter Bradbury, however, lived at Terara (since he worked for de Mestre) and helped to train Archer. John Cutts Dillon was the son of a Sydney clerk and one of the best-known, best-liked and most-respected jockeys in New South Wales.

== Racing career ==
In 1860 Archer was bought and trained by business associate and school friend of Tom Roberts Etienne de Mestre (1832–1916), from Terara near Nowra, New South Wales. De Mestre (who would go on to train four Melbourne Cup winners and win five Melbourne Cups) was the son of Sydney businessman Prosper de Mestre (1789–1844). Although Archer raced in Etienne de Mestre's name, Archer was not legally owned by de Mestre. De Mestre leased some of his horses from Hassall and Roberts for training and racing purposes including Mariner (Archer's older half-brother), Archer and Tim Whiffler (with whom he won the 1867 Melbourne Cup). As a lessee, de Mestre "owned" (was fully responsible for) the horses during their leases.

Archer was three years old when de Mestre began his training at Terara (near Nowra) in May 1860. Nicknamed "The Bull" by locals, Archer was considered large for a three-year-old; he stood 16.3 hands with powerful hindquarters, a deep girth, well-sprung ribs and a good head and neck. His idiosyncrasies included his curious rolling gait when galloping, and the fact that he galloped with his tongue lolling out of his mouth. He was a long-striding horse, who could cover 140 feet (43 m) in 16 strides. Archer's large frame told on his legs, and he was frequently lame. Archer was lightly regarded after he ran badly in his first two races at Randwick in late May 1860. However, at the spring meeting later that year and the autumn meeting of 1861 he was undefeated in seven New South Wales races.

The inaugural two-mile Melbourne Cup on 7 November 1861 at Flemington was an eventful affair. Three of the seventeen starters fell during the race (two of them died); two jockeys sustained broken bones; one horse bolted off the course, but the race continued. At the final turn the favourite, Mormon, made his run but Archer caught and passed him. Before a crowd of about 4,000, Archer (a Sydney outsider, who was injured during training a few days before the race and attracted slight betting interest) defeated Mormon by six lengths in a time of 3:52.0 – the slowest time in Melbourne Cup history. Archer also defeated Mormon at Randwick in May over 2 1/2 miles in the Australia Plate. In the first Melbourne Cup Archer won for de Mestre his prize was the sweepstake, 710 gold sovereigns (1 sovereign = £1), and a trophy (a hand-beaten gold watch). Before the race Archer was dismissed by the bookies, but after de Mestre of Terara made his wager Archer's odds shortened and he started as the 6-1 second favourite. The winning bets on Archer took money from Melbourne, "refuelling interstate rivalry" and adding to the excitement of the Cup. The next day, Archer won another two-mile race at Flemington (the Melbourne Town Plate) with the same time. In May 1862 Archer won the three-mile AJC Queen's Plate, and on 7 June 1862 Archer and Exeter were shipped back to Melbourne for the second Melbourne Cup. Archer was the Cup favourite; to prepare for the race, he was sent by railway from Melbourne to Geelong. In his first race in five months, Archer ran third on 1 October in the fifth three-mile Champion Sweepstakes.

Six weeks later (on 13 November 1862) Archer won his second Melbourne Cup carrying 10 st 2 lb – 142 pounds (64 kg) – at 2–1 odds in a time of 3:47.0. The race, held before a crowd of about 7,000 (nearly double the previous year's crowd), had 20 starters – the largest field of horses ever to start in Australia at that time. Again it was an exciting race; Cutts initially reined Archer back so that he was running last by several lengths, and appeared to be out of the running. He then gradually passed his opponents until reaching the leaders, when the long-striding horse galloped into first place. Archer won by eight lengths, with Mormon again running second. His winning margin is the Melbourne Cup record, unmatched until 1969 by Rain Lover. With a larger field meaning a larger sweepstake, Archer won 810 gold sovereigns and a trophy (a hand-beaten gold watch). Winning the Melbourne Cup two years in a row was a feat not repeated until Peter Pan won the race twice more than 70 years later. Two days later, Archer won the one-mile All-Aged Stakes at Flemington. Archer, Exeter and de Mestre arrived back in Sydney on the steamer Wonga Wonga on 29 November. The following week they caught another steamer to Wollongong, and traveled overland the 50 miles (80 km) to Terara.

A technicality resulted in Archer's being denied a third try at the Melbourne Cup. His telegraphed acceptance to race failed to arrive in time (delivery was delayed due to a public holiday in Melbourne), and Archer was refused permission to enter the race. Nominations for the 1863 Melbourne Cup had to be lodged with the Victorian Turf Club by Wednesday, 29 April, accompanied by five gold sovereigns. De Mestre had nominated two of his horses, Archer and Haidee. Weights were declared and published in Bell's Life in Sydney on Saturday, 9 May. Archer was to carry 11 st 4 lb (71.82 kg, or 158 lb) - which, if he had raced, would have been the heaviest handicap in the history of the Melbourne Cup. Under the care of groom and trainer Tom Lamond Archer and Haidee steamed to Melbourne, leaving Sydney on the City Of Melbourne Tuesday, 16 June. Acceptance, with an additional five-sovereign payment, had to be lodged with the VTC by 8 pm Wednesday, 1 July; de Mestre (still in Sydney) had overlooked the deadline. Reminded on the morning of 1 July by Sam Jenner of George Kirk & Co. of the deadline, de Mestre requested a telegram be sent to the Melbourne office of George Kirk & Co. asking them to accept on his behalf. De Mestre took the telegram to the telegraph office himself, and it was received in the Melbourne Telegraph Office at 1 pm. Wednesday, 1 July was a public holiday in Melbourne, and the telegram was not delivered to the George Kirk & Co. offices until 7:30 pm. The next morning George Kirk handed the telegram to the stewards at the Turf Club, who decided it was too late. This decision caused controversy amongst Archer's Sydney supporters, who had expected him to win. Pressure by Victorian owners made no difference to the VTC, which stood its ground. To protest this decision and show solidarity, the interstate entrants boycotted the third Cup. Unknown at the time, however, was that due to injury Archer would have been unlikely to race. The third Melbourne Cup ran with only seven Victoria horses, the smallest number in its history.

On 21 July de Mestre took the steamer City of Melbourne to Melbourne to oversee the training of his horses for the seventh Champion Sweepstakes at Ballarat on 1 October. Once again John Cutts was engaged to ride Archer, and he steamed to Melbourne on 4 August aboard the Rangatira. De Mestre's horses were sent from Melbourne to Ballarat by railway. During his training Archer was ill, lame and required veterinary care, and did not race well. His supporters angrily asked why de Mestre had not scratched him from the race. In reply, Rowland Hassall issued a statement that none of de Mestre's horses were public property. On 10 October, it was announced that Archer had "gone in one of his legs" after the race; the next day, he was scratched from all his Victoria engagements.

Brought to Sydney to prepare for the September Metropolitan Cup at Randwick Racecourse, Archer was seriously injured a month before the race during a veterinary treatment on 10 August 1864. He survived, and resumed training as soon as possible; however, he was ultimately scratched from the race. At the conclusion of the Randwick meeting, Archer was retired and returned to his owners Hassell and Roberts on Exeter Farm at Jembaicumbene, near where he had been foaled. This involved a rail trip from Sydney to Campbelltown, and an overland trip of 155 miles (249 km).

== Archer's Melbourne Cup record ==
- Winner of the first two Melbourne Cups (1861, 1862)
- For more than a century, only two horses won the Melbourne Cup twice: Archer (1861, 1862) and Peter Pan (1932, 1934).
- Slowest winning time – 3.52.0 (1861)
- First winner to carry a weight of over 10 st – 10 st 2 lb (1862)
- Winners by the largest margin – 8 lengths (1862, tied by Rain Lover in 1968)
- First non-favourite to win (1861)
- First favourite to win (1862)
- First past winner to be denied a starting place (1863)

== Race record ==
u/k = unknown
s = gold sovereign
1s = £1
1 mile = 1.6 km

| Age | Date | Track | Race | Distance (miles) | Jockey | Handicap | Field (No. horses) | Place | Time | Prize Money | + Sweepstake | Archer's winnings |
|---|---|---|---|---|---|---|---|---|---|---|---|---|
| 3 | 29 May 1860 | Randwick | Tattersall's; Free Handicap | 1 1/2 | John Cutts | 7 st 5 lb (46.82 kg) | 14 | Unplaced | u/k | 150s | 5s | Nil |
| 3 | 31 May 1860 | Randwick | Randwick Plate | 1 1/2 | John Cutts | 7 st 11 lb | 7 | Unplaced | 3:04 | 120s | 5s | Nil |
| 4 | 6 September 1860 | Randwick | Metropolitan; Maiden Plate | 1 3/4 | John Cutts | u/k | 6 | 1st | u/k | 150s | 5s x ? nominations ?s x ? acceptances ?s x ? starters | u/k |
| 4 | 8 September 1860 | Randwick | Randwick Plate | 1 1/2 | John Cutts | 9 st 5 lb (59.55 kg) | 2 | 1st | u/k | 100s | u/k | u/k |
| 4 | 25 September 1860 | Windsor | Hawkesbury; Maiden Plate | 1 3/4 | John Cutts | u/k | 5 | 1st | u/k | u/k | u/k | u/k |
| 4 | 27 September 1860 | Windsor | Stewards Purse | 1 1/4 | John Cutts | 9 st 4 lb (59.09 kg) | 2 | 1st | u/k | u/k | u/k | u/k |
| 4 | 2 May 1861 | Randwick | Australian Plate | 2 1/2 | John Cutts | u/k | u/k | 1st | u/k | u/k | u/k | u/k |
| 4 | 4 May 1861 | Randwick | Randwick Plate | 1 1/2 | John Cutts | 8 st 12 lb | 6 | 1st | u/k | 100s | u/k | u/k |
| 4 | 4 June 1861 | Maitland | Maitland; Town Plate | 2 1/2 | Etienne de Mestre | u/k | 2 | 1st | u/k | u/k | u/k | u/k |
| 5 | 7 November 1861 | Flemington | Melbourne Cup | 2 | John Cutts | 9 st 7 lb (60.45 kg) | 17 | 1st | 3.52.0 | 200s | 5s x 57 nominations +5s x ? acceptances +10s x 17 starters | 710s + gold watch |
| 5 | 8 November 1861 | Flemington | Melbourne; Town Plate | 2 | John Cutts | 9 st 13 lb (63.18 kg) | 5 | 1st | 3.52.0 | 100s | u/k | u/k |
| 5 | 26 April 1862 | Randwick | Randwick; Grand Handicap | 2 1/2 | John Cutts | u/k | 13 | 3rd | u/k | 250s | 5s x ? nominations + 5s x ? acceptances + 10s x 13 starters | u/k |
| 5 | 3 May 1862 | Randwick | AJC Queen's Plate | 3 | John Cutts | 10 st (63.64 kg) | 6 | 1st | 6:02 | 200s | 5s | u/k |
| 6 | 1 October 1862 | Geelong | Fifth Champion; Sweepstakes | 3 | John Cutts | 10 st 1 lb (64.09 kg) | 9 | 3rd | u/k | u/k | u/k | u/k |
| 6 | 13 November 1862 | Flemington | Melbourne Cup | 2 | John Cutts | 10 st 2 lb (64.55 kg) | 20 | 1st | 3.47.0 | 200s | 5s x ? nominations + 5s x ? acceptances + 10s x 20 starters | 810s + gold watch |
| 6 | 15 November 1862 | Flemington | All-Aged Stakes | 1 | John Cutts | 10 st 4 lb (65.45 kg) | u/k | 1st | 1.50.0 | u/k | u/k | u/k |
| 7 | 1 October 1863 | Ballarat | Seventh Champion; Sweepstakes | 3 | John Cutts | u/k | 5 | 3rd | u/k | 1000s | 20s x 5 starters + ? nominations & acceptances | u/k |
| 7 | 3 November 1863 | Flemington | Melbourne Cup | 2 | | 11 st 4 lb (71.82 kg) | | Scratched | | | | |

== Stud record ==
Archer was retired to stud at a fee of 10 guineas per mare (one of the highest stud fees of the time), but his progeny did not win a stakes race. He remained at Exeter Farm until his death at age 16 on 22 December 1872. He had wandered into a field of green barley, the consumption of which gave him a fatal inflammation of the lungs. Archer's jockey, John Cutts, had died three months earlier in September 1872.

Victorian craftswoman Therese Haynes was so enamoured of Archer that late in his life, she made a horseshoe ornament from his tail hair. She coiled the hair to create a horseshoe-shaped plaque, placed it in a silver setting and mounted it on red satin. Preserving relics from celebrities – a category that in Australia has often included horses – was a strong Victorian-era pastime. Today this piece of memorabilia can be found at the Australian Racing Museum in Melbourne.

== In popular culture ==
1985 Australian film Archer covers the story of Archer and his strapper David Power.

== See also ==
- List of racehorses

== Major Reference ==
- The Masters Touch, Racing with Etienne de Mestre, Winner of 5 Melbourne Cups by Keith W. Paterson, Published by Keith W. Paterson [Nowra] (2008) (ISBN 978-0-646-50028-7)

== Other references ==
- Archer at Thoroughbred Heritage.com
- Binney, Keith Robert (2005). Horsemen of the First Frontier (1788-1900) and the Serpent's Legacy. Volcanic Productions. p. 367. ISBN 0-646-44865-X.
- Shoalhaven Hall of Sporting Fame
- History of rail in Victoria
