= John Black (privateer) =

English sailor and privateer (1778–1802)

- Born: 31 October 1778; Great Yarmouth, Norfolk, England
- Died: c. May 1802 (aged 23); At sea on the way from Kolkata, India to Sydney, Australia
- Cause of death: Shipwreck
- Partner: Mary Hyde (1779–1864)
- Children: John Henry Black (1799–1867); Mary Ann Black (1801–1861)
- Parents: John Black (1753–1813); May Logie (1747–?)

Captain John Black (31 October 1778 – c. May 1802) was an English seafarer, who had a short but eventful career that included privateering and exploration. He was best known, during his own lifetime, for a mutiny on Lady Shore in August 1797, as it sailed south in the Atlantic Ocean, bound for Sydney, carrying female convicts. As a result of the mutiny, Black (a junior ship's officer at the time) and several other members of the crew were put into a small boat and left to find their way to the nearest land, being Brazil.

Black served twice on privateering vessels during the Anglo-Spanish War (1796–1808), including one appointment as ship's captain. As such, he was authorized by the British government to attack enemy vessels, with the intent of taking them and/or their cargoes as war booty, or sinking them. During both engagements, Black was involved in the capture of at least Spanish vessel. In 1798, the 19-year-old Black arrived at Port Jackson (Sydney Harbour), which was a base of operations for privateers. In addition to privateering, Black was involved in whaling, and voyages of exploration.

In Sydney, Black met a convict named Mary Hyde (1779–1864), with whom he had two children.

In 1798, Black's father, the Reverend John Black (1753–1813) – an established and prolific writer of prose and poetry – published a collection of his son's letters. The book included an account of the mutiny and was dedicated to the "Portuguese nation", as a "small testimony of gratitude" for the "unequalled hospitality" extended to Black and his companions in Brazil (which was part of the Portuguese Empire at the time).

On his final voyage, Black sailed in 1802 from Sydney, on a round-trip to India – visiting Mumbai (then known Bombay) and Kolkata (Calcutta). He and his vessel were lost at sea while returning to Sydney.

== Early life ==
Captain John Black was born on 30 September 1778 in Great Yarmouth, Norfolk, England, the eldest son of Scottish parents the Reverend John Black (1753–1813) and May Logie (1747–?). His parents moved to Woodbridge, Suffolk the next year, and it is here that he spent his childhood, and where his father, who had been a deacon when he was born, was ordained a priest in 1783.

In about 1795, at the age of 17 years and looking for adventure, John Black joined the ship the Walpole, an East Indiaman trader. Nothing more is known about his naval career until May 1797.

=== Account of the Mutiny on the Lady Shore ===
On 1 May 1797, John Black wrote to his father that he was at Torbay, Devon, England on board Lady Shore. John Black was the purser and navigator, and Lady Shore was bound for Sydney (then known as Port Jackson) with soldiers for the New South Wales Corps; Lieutenant William Minchin commanding officer of the detachment; a consignment of 69 female convicts; one male convict; and much needed supplies of food and farm implements for the Colony of New South Wales. Black also informed his father that the soldiers were "the most disagreeable, mutinous set of villains that ever entered into a ship". With good reason – mutinous because an attempt had already been made to seize the ship to avoid it arriving at its destination, and disagreeable villains because two of the sergeants had already needed to be placed in irons. Many of the soldiers in the detachment being sent to New South Wales were not there from choice, and one of the attempted mutineers had stated that he had been "sent on board by force from a police officer". The detachment of troops included French and Irish prisoners of war, deserters avoiding the military discipline of a court-martial, and prisoners from the Savoy Palace in London.

A month later, on 8 June 1797, when the Lady Shore was at Falmouth, Cornwall, England, she sailed out into the Atlantic Ocean in company with the West-India Fleet. 10 days later she was withdrawn from that fleet, and Lady Shore fell in with the 64-gun HMS Intrepid and the East-India Fleet. The threat of mutiny appeared to be in the past, and the soldiers, being very quiet in general, were allowed the possession of firearms and ammunition.

Now sailing on her own, and eight weeks after Lady Shore had sailed from Falmouth, the mutiny began. In the early morning on 1 August 1797, when Lady Shore was about four days sail from Rio de Janeiro, the soldiers and several of the sailors mutinied. During the fray John Black fired his pistol which took one of the mutineer's hats off, but was not able to do more damage. The mutineers quickly took over the ship and killed Captain Willcocks and the Chief Mate, Lambert. All those not in the mutiny, including the soldiers' officers and some privates, were imprisoned below decks.

Two weeks later, during the late afternoon of Monday 15 August 1797, John Black and 28 others were released from their imprisonment, put in a longboat with their luggage and some provisions, and cast astern. The others – men, women and children – comprised the second and third mates, the steward, the cabin boy, the commanding officer of the company of soldiers on board and his wife, five other officers, two privates, four wives, three children, one male passenger with his wife and two children, three female convicts, and the only male convict, Major James George Semple Lisle. For provisions they were given "three small casks of water, containing about ninety imperial gallons [410 L], four bags of bread and three pieces of salt beef" and managed to smuggle aboard "two hams, two cheeses, and a small keg containing about four gallons of rum", and for navigation a quadrant, and a small pocket compass. The Lady Shore mutineers (soldiers and sailors) then sailed away with the ship's surgeon and 66 female convicts. The 29 castaways in the longboat hoisted sail and headed for Rio Grande, Brazil, the nearest settlement on the Portuguese coast of South America, about 480 kilometres (300 mi) away.

Nearly exactly two days later, on 17 August 1797, after being battered by heavy seas, drenching rain, and contrary seas, they finally, with the assistance of a boat of people who had seen them from the shore, made landfall near to Rio Grande, Brazil. It was a "miraculous escape" as the locals could not believe that a boat could have survived in such weather. The castaways were hospitably received by the locals, and the Governor of Port St. Pedro promised them a passage to Rio de Janeiro by the first available ship.

After a frustrating wait of seven weeks, many false starts, and the loss of all his luggage and journals, Black decided to travel north overland to Rio de Janeiro. It was arranged for him to instead travel north overland to the Portuguese settlement on the island of St. Catharine (the island on which modern day Florianópolis is situated), and catch a ship from there. He left by horseback on 4 October 1797 with Lisle, the male convict who had proved himself trustworthy back in Torbay when he had reported the first attempted mutiny. Also on the journey, and provided by the Portuguese, were two servants, two Portuguese dragoons as guides, and an Indian to take care of the baggage horse. It was not an arduous journey with many stops to rest, eat and be feted by the local population along the way.

On 16 October 1797, after travelling overland by horse about 770 kilometres (480 mi), Black and Lisle caught a whaleboat to St Catharine's, where they found part of the Portuguese Squadron of ships anchored. They were well entertained during their stay, and left the island for Rio de Janeiro three and a half weeks later on 9 November 1797 in separate ships. Lisle was on the Portuguese Admiral Antonia Januario's ship, and Black was on board a Portuguese warship commanded by the English Captain Thompson. It was to take 10 days for the ships to sail north the 1,100 kilometres (680 mi) north to Rio de Janeiro, and they arrived on 19 November 1797.

Before travelling north to Rio de Janeiro, Black had learnt that Lady Shore had arrived in the enemy Spanish port of Montevideo, Uruguay about 500 kilometres (310 mi) south of Rio Grande. The men had been jailed, and the female convicts placed in different homes throughout the town. He later learnt that only the pretty girls were in the homes, and the rest of the women had been imprisoned. Lady Shore was sold in Montevideo for forty thousand dollars. What happened to the seventy soldiers (the mutineers of the New South Wales Corps), or what happened to the remainder of the sixty six, not so pretty, female convicts who were not taken into homes of the amorous Spanish is not known.

As the convey of English ships in the port of Rio Janeiro would not reach England before eight months, and sick at the thought of being idle for so long a time, Black instead decided to join as navigator Captain William Wilkinson's ship Indispensable, a ship with 14 guns and a crew of 32, that was being used as a privateer, but could also be used as a whaler. Black on the Indispensable was under sail two months after arriving in Rio de Janeiro. The Indispensable sailed down the coast of South America from Rio Janeiro on 20 January 1798. Looking for adventure and riches, they were hoping to capture a Spanish ship and take it over to the Cape of Good Hope.

=== John Black's later adventures ===
Writing to his father from the Cape of Good Hope on 15 April 1798 John Black disclosed that he had just arrived at the cape after captaining the 10-gun Spanish vessel La Union from Málaga in Spain, which Captain William Wilkinson of Indispensable and his crew (including Black) had captured. The Spanish ship had been on a voyage from the Plata River (Buenos Aires) in Argentina to Lima in Peru, and had been captured on 19 February 1798, one month after Black had sailed from Rio de Janeiro. He also mentions Cape Horn in his account, but does not specify when he may have been near there.

Over the next two months the cargo of the captured La Union was sold, and the ship disposed of. Among the cargo was tallow, candles, and dried beef, sought after commodities in the port. 19-year-old Black invested his share of the windfall in cargo to be sold in Sydney, and wrote to his father on 7 June 1798 "I have laid in a considerable investment for Port Jackson [at Sydney], which I hope to turn to good account, and I expect to sail to-morrow night".

It would have been easy for Captain Wilkinson of Indispensable to convince Black to invest in a trip to the port of Sydney. Indispensable had previously visited Sydney twice before: in May 1794 departing for Bengal in July 1794, and then in April 1796 when Wilkinson delivered 131 female convicts. On the second trip Indispensable had lingered in the port until 21 September 1796, giving Captain Wilkinson an insight as to the type of cargo that would raise the most money in Port Jackson.

With the strong westerlies along the southern coast of Australia it would have taken about 2 months for Indispensable to sail from the Cape of Good Hope to Sydney, and it should have arrived in early August 1798. It was a stormy passage across the Indian Ocean and then around the south of Van Diemens Land, when the ship lost two boats and one man overboard. The same storm stove in two boats and carried away several spars. On 8 September 1798, after he had been in port long enough to assess the situation, Black wrote to his father:

I am still among the living. By my last letter I informed you of having laid in an investment at the Cape for this place [that is, Sydney]. The market is very bad. The Barwell brought a large cargo from England, a vessel from Bengal and an American vessel with cargo of tabasco and spirits. These vessels have drained the place of all cash…Wheat, corn, beans, cabbages and fruit trees flourish, the cattle are of an uncommon size, and very fierce. An old horse, which in England would be valued at five pounds for dog's meat, sells here for 100 guineas.

Black went on to say that he chased a flock of black swans twenty-four kilometres (15 mi) down the river, but as they were shy never got a shot at them. He mentioned that the Governor (John Hunter) was a pleasant, sensible old man. John Black also informed his father of the doubtful monetary dealings in the colony; and described the agricultural and natural aspects of the country. He also described the harbour as "one of the best in the known world", and that he expected in a fortnight to sail on a cruise for two months to fish (catch whales). This was the first time that Black was to go whaling, the most dangerous and masculine of sea trades.

What he didn't mention in his letter was that he had met a girl, and made her pregnant, but then it is highly possible that he didn't yet know that he was to become a father. In August 1798, when they were both 19 years old, John Black met Mary Hyde, a convict girl and who the month before had arrived in Sydney on board the Britannia II. Mary came under John's "protection" and fell pregnant almost immediately.

John Black, however, wasn't long in port. As planned, in late September 1798 his ship the Indispensable left to do some "fishing" (whaling). Governor Hunter wrote on 25 September 1798 that some of the whalers that were in the harbour (including the Britannia II on which Mary Hyde had arrived) had proceeding on their fishing, and the town had been freed from the nuisance of the seamen who could not resist the two temptations of spirits and women. The ship didn't return until 27 October 1798, and left again "immediately" on a second "fishing" trip, not returning again until 29 December 1798. Indispensable returned from this second trip with 55 tonnes (54 long tons) of sperm whale oil from whaling within a range of 201 kilometres (125 mi) above and below Sydney, and within 140 kilometres (90 mi) of the coast. Indispensable then needed a refit, and John Black needed to stay in port for a considerable time.

In March 1799 Governor Hunter granted a lease of land to "Mr. John Black, late purser of the Lady Shore transport". This allotment is shown on surveyor James Meehan's map of Sydney on the eastern side of George Street, between Hunter Street and Martin Place, where De Mestre Place is today. This land was later held in trust for John Black's two children, and became the land on which Black's son-in-law Prosper de Mestre resided and ran his business from.

From then on, while John Black sailed in and out of Sydney, Mary Hyde resided on this allotment backing onto the Tank Stream. Black's family was fending for itself while John was often away for months at a time, or even longer, either whaling or otherwise working his trade as a ship's officer.

On 31 May 1799 John Henry Black, son of John Black and Mary Hyde, was born at home. Fortunately John was home at the time to see his new-born son. But three days later he sailed again.

It was reported that Indispensable sailed for "fishing" about 3 June 1799. David Collins wrote "About this time the Indispensable sailed on her fishing voyage. This ship had been careened and completely repaired in the Cove". There is no record of her return to port, but it had to have been before the baptism of Black's son on 2 September 1799. It was not long after that Black again left his family and sailed back to Cape Town from Sydney in what was then regarded as the shortest passage (time-wise). It was a long tedious voyage up the east coast of Australia, above New Guinea, and through the islands of Indonesia using the more favourable winds of the south-east monsoon (as compared to the adverse strong westerlies along the southern coast of Australia) before sailing upwind or beating across the Indian Ocean down to Cape Town.

After arriving in Cape Town some months later, John Black became engaged in adventure that continued to keep him away from his family. The Englishman was engaged for the first time as a Captain on the privateer Chance owned by Michael Hogan. As Spain was then at war with England, Black was engaged to sail from Cape Town seeking Spanish ships. His mission was successful as on 8 July 1800 a Spanish Brig of 70 tons arrived in Cape Town carrying prize colours.

After taking his share of the spoils from the sale of the Spanish brig and its cargo, Black took command of the brig Harbinger also owned by Michael Hogan. Carrying a cargo of 13 thousand litres (2,800 imperial gallons) of spirits and 14 thousand litres (3,000 imperial gallons) of wine, in November 1800 Black began to sail back to Sydney, and his family.

As an aside, in 1800 it was recorded that "Mary Hide [sic] and her son were off the [government] stores". This was because Hide, "living on the lease of Mr. Black; and owing 7 sheep, 4 pigs and 3 goats", had been able to meet a level of self-sufficiency, something the government greatly encouraged in an effort to cut costs.

Heading east across the Indian Ocean for Sydney, with instructions to take the short cut through the newly discovered Bass Strait (which separated Australia from Tasmania), he followed in the wake of the brig HMS Lady Nelson, the first ship to sail eastward through the new-found Bass Strait. Harbinger embarked on an investigation of the strait tracking around Cape Otway, Cape Danger and Cape Patten down to the northern part of King Island, and around Wilsons Promontory. Black had sheltered near two small islands which he named the New Year Isles, and then sailed on and named the larger island King Island after Governor Philip Gidley King. He also named the Harbinger Rocks, and the Hogan Group of islands. A chart drawn later by Governor King shows John Black's course through Bass Strait. Governor King's report on the voyage reads:

A small brig from the Cape of Good Hope, commanded by Mr. Black (a person of good abilities as a surveyor and navigator) passed thro and keeping more to the Southward made Cape Albany Otway and standing to the southward made an island lying in the centre of the west entrance of the strait which he named King Island and afterwards passed thro the centre of the strait unadvisable to attempt from the east only from the west.

A copy of Black's writing on the passage through Bass Strait in Harbinger was sent to England with Governor King's letter.

Black arrived back in Sydney on 11 January 1801 after having been away for 14 months, at which time his partner Mary Hyde promptly became pregnant with their second child. This was the beginning of his longest time in port and with his family, and lasted nearly 12 months.

Black discharged his cargo of rum and wines in Sydney into the warehouse that the businessman Simeon Lord had built specifically for this purpose. (Simeon Lord was later to be the step-father to Black's children.) In selling his cargo Black had entered Sydney's liquor trade, and established a shop on his leased land. It was reported

Simeon Lord sells rum at 32/- a gallon, Capt. Cox ditto, Black his gin at 10 [... guineas] a case, etc. These are Governor King's regulations for the benefit of the Colony while American ships who would be glad to sell their liquor at 5/-, 6/- or 7/- per [... gallon] are turned away! Why!

Black also negotiated with Governor King to sell Harbinger to the Governor on behalf of its owner. On 1 May 1801 the Governor wrote to the Duke of Portland, stressing the old age of vessels used by the Government and the need for replacements.

The Master of the brig Harbinger, recently arrived from the Cape, has offered her for sale. As a vessel is needed to go between Norfolk Island to carry supplies and bring salt port from thence, I directed a survey to be taken of that vessel, also an inventory of her masts, rigging and furniture. The sum demanded by the owner was 1500 pounds and the offer I made him was 700 pounds, though much less than her real value.

Because of money shortage in Sydney, there was no other bidder for Harbinger, so Black was compelled to accept the Governor's 700 pounds.

The documents relating to Harbinger's sale were signed by John Black in June 1801 where he described himself as a resident of Sydney, and receipted by him on 3 August 1801.

John Black's and Mary Hyde's second child, Mary Ann Black, was born on 1 October 1801.

It was on 1 January 1802 that 23-year-old John Black next left Sydney. His partner Mary Hyde was left at home as the sole parent of two children under the age of three, and one only 3 months old. John Black was employed as Captain of the Campbells & Co. brig Fly sailing for Mumbai (then Bombay) and then Kolkata (then Calcutta) to pick up goods from India for the Sydney warehouses of Robert Campbell. Black managed to make the voyage up the east coast of Australia, above New Guinea, through the islands of Indonesia, and across to Mumbai and then Kolkata in very good time. In April 1802 the Fly departed Kolkata for the return voyage to Sydney. Fly left the pilot on 14 May 1802 to continue sailing south across the Indian Ocean, along the bottom of Australia, through the Bass Strait above Tasmania, and then up the east coast to Sydney, or so was the plan. However, sometime after 14 May 1802 the ship was lost at sea with all hands, if not on its passage across the Indian Ocean then somewhere in the stormy and ice-berg strewn ocean below southern Australia.

News did not reach Sydney until nearly 12 months later that Black's ship was missing. News of the probable loss of Fly was reported by Captain Allan M'Askell of Castle of Good Hope when it arrived in Sydney in February 1803 to find that Fly had never arrived. The Ship News in the Sydney Gazette & New South Wales Advertiser of 5 March 1803 reported the loss;

we have been informed of the more than probable loss of the Fly, a vessel of about 100 tons burthen, laden with piece and other valuable goods, also bound for this place, and belonging to the House of Campbells, at Calcutta. She left Calcutta in the month of April last [that is, 1802], and has not since been heard of; was commanded by Mr. John Black, a young man much esteemed here by all who knew him.

Black's death was not publicly confirmed until April 1804 when the Ship News in the Sydney Gazette & New South Wales Advertiser of 15 April 1804 reported: "The brig Fly, Captain Black, that sailed from Calcutta for this colony in April 1802 has never been heard of".
