= Prosper de Mestre =

- Born: Jean Charles Prosper de Mestre; 15 August 1789; Lorient, Brittany, France
- Died: 14 September 1844 (aged 55) "Terara", Greenwell Point, New South Wales, Australia
- Other names: Prosper Mestre; John Charles Prosper de Mestre
- Citizenship: French, American, Australian
- Occupations: Merchant, importer, business leader
- Spouse(s): Mary Ann Black (1801-1861)
- Children: 10 children: Prosper Jean (Prosper John) de Mestre (1821-1863); Andre Cotteral de Mestre (1823-1917); Helen Mary Williams nee de Mestre (1825-1907); Sarah Louisa Wason nee de Mestre (1827-?); Melanie Isabella Lovegrove nee de Mestre (1829-1925); Etienne Livingstone de Mestre (1832-1916); Mary Ann Hart nee de Mestre (1834-1925); Katherine Dorothy Ramsay nee de Mestre (1836-1905); Louisa Jane Hutchison nee de Mestre (1839-?) Annette Marland Slade nee de Mestre (1841-1936)
- Parent(s): André Charles de Mestre (c.1756-1794) & Helene Thomasse Cottrel (1768-1851)

Jean Charles Prosper de Mestre (15 August 1789– 14 September 1844), known as Prosper de Mestre, was a French-born prominent businessman in Sydney, Australia from 1818 until near his death in 1844. He was a "citizen of the world", (His citizenship was listed as French, American and Australian) who played an important role in the development of commerce and banking in the British Colony of New South Wales. He became a successful merchant and business leader in Sydney. In 1825 he became the second person to be naturalised in the colony. In addition to being one of the early directors of the Bank of New South Wales between 1826 and 1842, he was also a founder of the local insurance industry, a member of the committee of the Agricultural Society of New South Wales, and became involved in importing, shipping and whaling. There are numerous references to his business activities in the Colonial Secretary's papers of the day.

== Background ==
De Mestre was also the father of Etienne Livingstone de Mestre (1832–1916), the trainer of Archer the horse who won the first and second Melbourne Cups in 1861 and 1862, and the foremost Australian horse trainer of his era. His other descendants include: Sarah Melanie de Mestre (1877–1961) who distinguished herself as a nurse in France and Flanders in World War I, and whose decorations included the Royal Red Cross which was presented to her at Buckingham Palace by King George V on 3 June 1918 (the King's birthday); Roy de Maistre (1894–1968), a successful Australian artist; Guboo Ted Thomas (1909–2002) a prominent Aboriginal leader, and the last initiated tribal elder on the South Coast of New South Wales; Margaret Augusta de Mestre (1915–1942), a nurse who was killed in action on a hospital ship on 26 February 1942 in the bombing of Darwin during World War II; Neville de Mestre (c.1938- ), an eminent Australian mathematician and author, Emeritus Professor of Maths at Bond University, and who has held the titles of World Iron Man champion in the 60-64 age group, and Australian and World Masters surfing champion in the over-65 group for body surfing; and Lloyd Nolan Hornsby (1947- ), a prominent Aboriginal artist.

It is not true that Prosper, or his younger sister Melanie, are the children of Julie de St Laurent. It is therefore also not true that Prosper is the son of a liaison between Julie de St Laurent and Edward Duke of Kent, the father of Queen Victoria. This mistaken belief has become legend due to the incorrect assertion that Julie de St Laurent was the wife of Prosper's father André Charles de Mestre. It is true that André Charles lost his head and his life on the battle field at Martinique, and that Prince Edward was at Martinique at the time, but this death was of no significance to either Prince Edward or Julie de St Laurent.

The other incorrect assertion about Prosper's birth was made by Prosper himself in a letter dated 25 March 1830 and written to both the Collector and the Comptroller of Customs of the Colonial Government of New South Wales stating his claim to be a British subject. In this letter he made a statement that claimed he had been born in 1793 while his parents had been fleeing the French Revolution on a British ship bound for Martinique. This statement was made to protect Prosper's commercial interests when he had applied to register a British ship, and the legality of his claim to hold a British-flagged ship was questioned. Chief Justice (Sir) Francis Forbes of the Supreme Court of New South Wales, after various letters and evidence (including Prosper's letter to the Collector and Comptroller of Customs), ruled that because Prosper had been born on the high seas in a British ship he was a British subject, and therefore his application must succeed. However Prosper was not born on the high seas in a British ship, but was born on dry land in France. Prosper's lie was not exposed in his lifetime. Neither was it exposed by his many children & descendants in the intervening years, who had always believed that he had told the truth. It was exposed in 2008, nearly 180 years after the statement was made, by his great, great, great granddaughter Maree Amor (née Wade) when she was finally able to track down the record of his baptism. The correct details of Prosper's birth follow.

== Family history ==
Prosper de Mestre, whose full name was Jean Charles Prosper de Mestre, was the son of Helene Thomasse Cottrel (1760–1851). He was born illegitimately on 15 August 1789 in Lorient, in Brittany in France. His father, who wasn't present at his birth, is believed to be André de Mestre (c.1756-1794). André Charles and his elder brother Jean, after whom it appears Jean Charles Prosper was named, were both soldiers in the French Army, and André rose to the rank of lieutenant colonel. Prosper's younger sister Melanie Caroline Jeanne Mestre was born 15 months later on 15 November 1790 in Lorient, and her father André Charles and her mother Helene claimed at the time that they had married in 1788 in Helene's home town of Rennes. No record of a marriage has been found in 1788 at Rennes, or at any other time, or in any other place, and it is believed that they never did legalise their union. In March 1791 André Charles' regiment was transferred under the royalist new Governor-General Behague to the island of Martinique in the French Caribbean, regarded politically as part of France. It was here three years later, in March 1794, that Prosper's father André Charles died. The republican General Rochambeau, who had taken over in Martinique in February 1793, and who had promoted Prosper's father to the rank of colonel of artillery on 10 February 1793, recorded details of Prosper's father's death in his journal. In the journal entry dated 14 March 1794 is the record

"The Colonel Mestre of the artillery had his head taken off by a cannon ball. I was covered in his blood and I had a slight bruise of the heel. This officer was of great merit and his loss is irreplaceable. He was day and night on the ramparts. His talents were known to me during the war in the countryside that had already happened in this country and I have myself to recognise them on this occasion. His activities were greater during the siege and his multiple assets were to be at the same time director of the artillery, captain of the gun markers and the bombardier. He leaves a wife and two children. The republic should take care of them and give them a pension because this brave man had no fortune at all except his talents, his courage and his qualities.

There is another gruesome mention of Prosper's father's death further down in the journal entry where mention is made of André Charles' skull bones wounding the General's aide, Marlet, in the kidneys. A year later in March 1795, Prosper's mother Helene married an officer of the invading British Army, Captain James "Jean" Armstrong (1769-aft.1836) of the 6th (1st Warwickshire) Regiment of Foot.

== Early life ==
The next record of Prosper de Mestre is not in Martinique, but in Philadelphia, Pennsylvania, as his parents had moved; this is where he received his schooling. He was known at this time as Prosper Mestre. He was naturalised an American citizen by the Court of Quarter Sessions in Philadelphia on 5 June 1811; at this point he was 21 being "of full age", which confirms that he was born before June 1790. In his naturalisation papers he stated that he had arrived in Philadelphia on 14 April 1802, when he would have been 12 years old. He was to state in his statement in 1830 that he was sent to Philadelphia in 1802 following the (British) evacuation of Martinique after the Treaty of Amiens. Unlike much of the rest of his 1830 statement, the year of his arriving in Philadelphia appears to be true, as it agrees with his earlier statement in 1811. Prosper was joining his mother and sister in the United States where she had given birth to Prosper's younger brother Andrew Cottrel Armstrong. In 1802, when Prosper joined her, Prosper's mother was living in Philadelphia as a single mother and widow, In late 1803 she married Joseph Coulon (1763–1815), a Frenchman and naturalised American citizen (Philadelphia 1798), an import merchant, who had connections with France, with Pondicherry in India, with Mauritius, and possibly also with the Caribbean.

== Sydney ==
According to Prosper's 1830 statement he left Philadelphia in 1812 and travelled to China, and he also resided in Mauritius, India and "other British Colonies". This part of Prosper's 1830 statement was largely correct. Prosper had left Philadelphia in 1812 working in the shipping industry for his stepfather, Joseph Coulon, as supercargo. Then, no longer working for his stepfather who had died at the end of 1815 as the result of a shipwreck off the coast of New Jersey, the much travelled 25-year old arrived in Sydney on 4 April 1818 on board the Schooner the "Magnet" which had sailed from Calcutta via Mauritius to Sydney. (Coincidentally a ship that was later wrecked off the coast of a whaling station in New Zealand less than two weeks before Prosper died in September 1844.) After living in various countries and arriving in Sydney as supercargo on the "Magnet", Prosper liked what he saw, and decided to stay.

== Career ==
Prosper set himself up in business in Sydney as an import merchant. Using his overseas trade connections through fellow American citizens in China, he began to import goods, including tea. He was able to import Chinese goods into Sydney because he was not a British subject but an American one. He was then able to undersell other Sydney merchants who, as British subjects, had to buy their tea and other Chinese goods from the British East India Company which had been granted a monopoly. (When he first arrived in Sydney Prosper never claimed to be a British citizen, as he later did in 1830, as it would not have served his then commercial interests. Even though the British East India Company retained its monopoly until 1833, and Prosper's claim to be a British citizen in 1830 would hurt his trade in goods from China, he was no longer so dependent on this trade. He had branched out by that time into many other commercial dealings, of which obtaining the registration of his ship was the most important in 1830.)

Prosper's commercial trading advantage, from his importation of goods from China, was seen by other Sydney merchants as unfair and caused resentment. One of the disgruntled was Edward Eagar, an emancipist who had been disbarred from practicing law in New South Wales and had instead become a merchant. In 1820 Edward Eagar brought a qui tam action against the American merchant Prosper de Mestre. This was a highly technical action under the antiquated Navigation Act which prohibited aliens from "trading in the King's plantations". Described by the court as a "gentleman convict", Eagar's legal ploy was an attempt to ruin Prosper, and to benefit financially himself. If successful, he would have bankrupted Prosper as his estates would have been forfeited: two-thirds going to the Crown (the King and Governor); and the remainder to the informer, Eagar. Prosper successfully defended the action on a legal technicality. He pleaded "that a convicted felon could not sue in a British Court of Justice". Although in 1818 Governor Lachlan Macquarie had given Eager an absolute pardon, his name, like other former convicts, had not been inserted in any "General Pardon under the Great Seal". Therefore, under British Law, the colonial pardon was not recognised. Justice Barron Field of the Supreme Court of New South Wales agreed with Prosper's argument, and Eagar's action failed. As a result, Eagar, along with others of like mind, began to organize to protect the rights of emancipists and improve their doubtful status, advocating the cause of "equitable justice for all emancipists". One of those of like mind that Eagar collaborated with was the child of a convict, and barrister, William Charles Wentworth, who returned to Sydney from overseas in 1823.

== Marriage ==
On 1 March 1821 31-year-old Prosper married 19-year-old Mary Ann Black (1801–1861) at St Philip's Church, Sydney. Mary Ann, not yet "of full age" and 12 years his junior, was the daughter of the privateer (state-sanctioned pirate) and ship's captain John Black, and the former convict Mary Hyde who in 1855 took the Commissioners of the City of Sydney to the House of Lords and won. Mary was also the stepdaughter of Simeon Lord, an emancipist, and a pioneer merchant and magistrate in early Sydney. Mary Ann was a good catch for de Mestre, with her stepfather Simeon Lord's connections being invaluable to Prosper's business dealings. Over the next 20 years Prosper and Mary Ann had ten children. The youngest of their three sons was horse trainer Etienne Livingstone de Mestre (1832–1916) who after his father's death established a horse stud, stable and racecourse on Prosper's former property of "Terara" near the mouth of the Shoalhaven River, and won five Melbourne Cups, including the first two in 1861 and 1862.

== Naturalisation ==
William Charles Wentworth's collaboration with Eagar, following Eagar's unsuccessful action against Prosper in 1820, did not stop Wentworth from acting professionally for Prosper. In 1825 William Charles Wentworth, who Prosper had met through his stepfather Simeon Lord, acted for Prosper to successfully pressed the New South Wales Legislative Council for a special Act to naturalise de Mestre. The Act was passed on 30 August 1825, and published in the Sydney Gazette and New South Wales Advertiser by the Governor Sir Thomas Brisbane on 1 September. Under this Act of the First Legislative Council of New South Wales (6 Geo. IV, no. 17 Naturalization (Prosper de Mestre) Act. 30 August 1825) Prosper took the necessary oaths in September 1825, the second person, and second American citizen, to be naturalized in the Colony of New South Wales. This colonial naturalisation declared Prosper to be a "Natural-born Subject of Great Britain, and to be entitled to all the Rights, Privileges, and Advantages, which are conferred on Foreign Protestants".

The legality of the colonial naturalisation to make Prosper a British subject was questioned five years later in 1830. Wentworth, who for political and professional reasons would not have wanted the court to need to consider the legality of naturalisation act passed by the Legislative Council of New South Wales in 1825, again advised Prosper during the 1830 action. The court needed to be able to declare Prosper a British subject by other means. It is of no co-incidence that, in 1790 shortly before his parents arrived at the penal settlement of Norfolk Island, Wentworth had been born at sea on a British ship. His place of birth ensured that Wentworth's legal status as a British subject was protected. If Prosper claimed to have been born at sea on a British ship, Prosper could establish that he was a British subject, and his application to register a British ship would succeed. As a supposed British subject by birth, Prosper's social and legal status in the colony would also be improved. A carefully crafted statement was drafted that mixed fact with fiction. Prosper had been born in France before his family had moved to Martinique, where his soldier father had been killed in action against the British in March 1794. If instead he said that he had been born at sea while his family had been escaping from the French Revolution on a British vessel, and, being careful not to mention which side his father had been fighting for, at a time before his father died; then Prosper could not only establish that he was a British subject, but also obtain a sympathetic hearing. He also needed to explain his known connection with America, and more sympathy would be given if he mentioned his residence in India and "other British Colonies", his mother's marriage to a British officer, his own marriage to a British subject, and his then 5 children. No one doubted the word and signed statement of such a prominent businessman. Chief Justice (Sir) Francis Forbes of the Supreme Court of New South Wales was impressed, and the court ruled (incorrectly) that Prosper was a British subject because he had been born on the high seas in a British ship.

== Commerce ==
Prosper's commercial interests in the Colony of New South Wales were mainly in shipping and whaling. Six vessels he owned made 23 whaling voyages from Sydney between 1828 and 1842. But he also became active in wider commerce. In June 1823 he was elected a director of Sydney and Van Diemen's Land Packet Company. In June 1825 he was elected to the committee of the Agricultural Society of New South Wales. Prosper was a director of the Bank of New South Wales (1822–23, 1826–28, 1829–42), and in the 1830s he was a director of the Australian Marine Assurance Company. In 1840 he was a founder of the Mutual Fire Insurance Company of Sydney.

Prosper de Mestre was a benevolent man, who regularly donated to charities. These included the Benevolent Fund, and the Catholic Chapel Fund, which financed the building of St. Mary's Cathedral, the first Catholic Church in the community. He had been born a Roman Catholic, but he also became active in church affairs of the Church of England, the religion of his wife and children, and the official religion of the Colony. In 1836 as a supporter of the Church of England he joined the committee in opposition to the proposed National School System and in 1841 he became a trustee of Christ Church St. Laurence.

Prosper was also involved in many real estate dealings. His first property purchase was in 1821 in George Street, Sydney, an allotment that had been received by his brother-in-law John Henry Black as his dower, and that was next door to a portion of land that his wife Mary Ann had also received as her dower on her marriage, and had been held in trust by her stepfather Simeon Lord from an original land lease given to her father Captain John Black. It was on the George Street properties that his wife had been born, and on the George Street properties that Prosper resided with his family, and also had his counting house. The site is found today at a small lane named De Mestre Place. In addition to the George Street properties, Prosper applied for his first land grant, and on 7 September 1821 was granted 700 acres (2.8 km^{2}) at West Bargo, near Camden. The grant was on condition that he maintain and employed seven convicts on the property. In 1831-32 he bought a section of land (the Helsarmel Estate) at Leichhardt in Sydney, from a Captain Piper. In 1824 (prior to his 1825 naturalisation) Prosper De Mestre was first promised a land grant by Governor Thomas Brisbane. 1,300 acres (5.3 km^{2}) were authorised on the southern shore of the Shoalhaven River near present-day Nowra in 1829. However he did not receive the grant until 1836 from Governor Sir Richard Bourke, and he named the property "Terara".

The homestead Mill Bank House which still stands in Millbank Road, was probably erected at this time, and a village named Terara soon began to develop. He eventually owned several houses in Sydney, including his main house, 32 acres (130,000 m^{2}) at Petersham, and many farm allotments. To consolidate some of his business investments, on 31 May 1837, at "the Premises lately occupied by Prosper De Mestre" in George Street he sold at auction a number of properties, being: 3,160 acres (12.8 km^{2}) at Brisbane Water; 700 acres (2.8 km^{2}) in the parish of Holdsworth; building allotments in Kent St, Sydney; four 25-acre (100,000 m^{2}) farms at Lane Cove; 640 acres (2.6 km^{2}) at Camden; and 3,200 acres (13 km^{2}) at Ellulang. He no longer needed to live in the George Street property as he had moved his residence to the corner of Liverpool and Elizabeth streets as he had purchased an "excellent mansion" overlooking and situated at the south end of Hyde Park. Finally he also received another land grant of 1,280 acres (5.2 km^{2}) called Yerrigong on the Calymea Creek about six miles (10 km) west of Terara granted by Governor George Gipps on 17 February 1841.

On 31 May 1837 he also sold 50 shares in the Australian Marine Assurance Company, the Hoffan's Cordials business, and a lithographic press. Then, due to the depression of the early 1840s, and failing health, Prosper become insolvent in 1844. Most of his land and property needed to be auctioned to pay his debts. As the George Street property had been her dower, his wife Mary Ann questioned whether it should be included in the sale. Her solution was that the more valuable George Street property could be included in the sale, if the Shoalhaven properties were not. In exchange she also asked for "the whole of the plate, horses etc., etc., on the establishment in Liverpool Street, the six cows, horse and cart at Helsarmel", and to be "permitted to occupy the 32 acres at Petersham until the house at Shoal Haven can be rendered fit for the residence of my family." His house in Liverpool St, and its "elegant Household Furniture", was sold by auction on 16 May 1844, and the family was moved briefly to Petersham and then onto Terara, which Prosper had initially developed as a hobby farm.

== Death ==
De Mestre, died at the family estate "Terara," Greenwell Point, Shoalhaven on 14 September 1844, after a short illness, He was buried at "Terara", and his wife was also later interred on the site.
