= Roy De Maistre =

Australian artist

- Born: Leroy Livingstone de Mestre; 27 March 1894; Bowral, New South Wales, Australia
- Died: 1 March 1968 (aged 73); London, England
- Other names: LeRoy Leveson Laurent Joseph de Maistre, Roi de Mestre, LeRoi Levistan de Mestre
- Known for: Painting
- Movement: Abstraction, Cubism
- Awards: Order of the British Empire (1962)

Roy De Maistre CBE (27 March 1894 – 1 March 1968) was an Australian artist of international fame. He is renowned in Australian art for his early experimentation with "colour-music", and is recognised as the first Australian artist to use pure abstraction. His later works were painted in a figurative style generally influenced by Cubism. His Stations of the Cross series hangs in Westminster Cathedral and works of his are hung in the Tate Gallery, London and in the Art Gallery of New South Wales, Sydney.

== Early life ==
Roy went by the name of Leroy Leveson Laurent Joseph De Maistre, but had been born as Leroy Livingstone de Mestre at Bowral, New South Wales on 27 March 1894 into a home of high social standing in the then Colony of New South Wales. He was the youngest son of Etienne Livingstone de Mestre (1832–1916), the thoroughbred racehorse trainer of the first two Melbourne Cup winners; and the grandson of Prosper de Mestre (1789–1844) a prominent Sydney businessman from 1818 to 1844.

De Maistre was educated, together with his brothers and sisters, by tutors and governesses at the family home near Sutton Forest. In 1913 Roy was sent to Sydney to continue his music and art studies. He studied the violin and viola at the New South Wales State Conservatorium of Music, including playing the viola in the Sydney Orchestra. He studied painting at the Royal Art Society of New South Wales under Antonio Dattilo-Rubbo who encouraged interest in Post-Impressionism, alongside fellow students Norah Simpson, Grace Cossington Smith and Roland Wakelin. He produced works inspired by reproductions of European post-impressionists, such as van Gogh, Gauguin and Cézanne. Then he studied under Norman Carter and also at the Julian Ashton Art School in Sydney.

== World War I ==
In 1916, as art-student Roi Livingstone de Mestre, he joined the First Australian Imperial Force. He was accepted three times after initially being rejected because his chest measurement was allegedly undersized. It appears to be indicative of the great desire of the armed forces to procure men for the World War I effort that they would have considered accepting De Maistre once, let alone three times in short succession – and indicative of his great desire to serve in the war effort that he continually rejoined even after he had found himself too weak to cope with the workload. In May 1916 he was accepted for the first time but discharged a month later in June as medically unfit. He joined again one month later in July, but unable to cope physically at his own request he was discharged two months later in September. He joined yet once more one month later in October and was sent to the Field Hospital at Liverpool to train as a medical orderly.

Then three months later in January 1917 he again requested a discharge as he felt that the work was beyond him. Due to his general weakness and debility his request for discharge was easily accepted. His general weakness and debility was due to tuberculosis that he had been able to keep hidden from the army doctors, one of whom even described his illness as congenital. Each time he joined up his illness had beaten him, and he had been unable to continue. Tuberculosis was the reason why he had earlier given up any idea of pursuing a music career, and had turned solely to painting.

== Painting ==
In November 1916, as Roi de Mestre, he first exhibited, showing Impressionist paintings concerned with the effects of light.

In 1917 he met Dr Charles Gordon Moffit from the Kenmore Hospital in Goulburn, with whom he was to work devising a "colour treatment" for shell-shocked soldiers by putting them in rooms painted in soothing colour combinations. De Maistre developed an interest in "colour-music", his theory of colour harmonisation based on the relationship between colours of the spectrum and notes of the musical scale. With his ordered, analytical mind, he applied the theory of music to his painting. He worked with Adrian Verbrugghen, and then Roland Wakelin to devise a "colour-music" theory. In 1919 he held a joint exhibition with Wakelin titled Colour in Art to expound his theories. In this (at the time controversial) art exhibition the musician-turned-painter had chosen colours to harmonise like the notes in music. The exhibition showcased 'colour orchestration', an experiment on the interrelation between different hues on the colour spectrum and notes on the musical scale. For example, the note A was matched with the colour red. The only existing example of this experiment is Rhythmic composition in yellow green minor (1919), which visualises music slowly unravel through the flow of colours. This "colour-music" exhibition became part of Australia's art-folklore as "pictures you could whistle". Influenced by earlier exponents of "colour-music" theory in Europe and America, this exhibition has since been identified as the earliest experiment in pure abstractionism in Australia. His colour charts, showing musical notes corresponding to different hues, are now owned by the Art Gallery of New South Wales, with "colour music" gaining a permanent place in Australian art history.

De Maistre was also interested in interior decoration and the manner in which the colours within a room could impact upon the human psyche. While exhibiting traditional pieces of fine art in the Colour in Art exhibition, he also included a 'Colour Organisation in Interior Decoration' segment. In this part of the exhibition, De Maistre displayed domestic interiors based on his 'colour music'. Discs and scales to help home-owners integrate colour music into their own homes were made available for purchase. In 1924, this colour harmonising chart was further developed by Grace Bros and placed for sale in their stores.

=== Inter-war years ===
After 1919, De Maistre virtually abandoned colour-music and abstraction, though in London in 1934 he reworked some of those same ideas. His paintings of 1921–22 are experiments in impersonal, unemotional tonalism, and from the 1930s he turned to a more recognisably figurative style of work generally influenced by Cubism.

In 1922 he had his first painting purchased by the Art Gallery of New South Wales, Still Life.

In 1923 he went to Europe on a travelling Art Scholarship by the Sydney Society of Artists. He spent three years abroad, studying in London, and in France in Paris and Saint-Jean-de-Luz, where he created Sea piece, St Jean de Luz (1925), a landscape painting featured a mild semblance of his earlier practice with colour and abstraction. He also visited Italy, Spain, Belgium, and the Netherlands. In 1924, while abroad, he patented the "De Maistre Colour Harmonising Chart", which was produced and marketed by Grace Bros, a Sydney department store.

On returning to Sydney, he held one-man shows (1926 & 1928); contributed to annual exhibitions; conducted classes in modern art to private pupils from his studio in Burdekin House, Macquarie Street, Sydney; and organised in his house an exhibition of modern interior design (1929). From his family's prominent position in society, he helped to make modern art fashionable in Sydney in the late 1920s, or at least as fashionable as it could be. The American architect Walter Burley Griffin and de Maistre created the interior decoration for the cafe opened by Pakie Macdougall in Sydney in 1929. The anti-modernist criticism he received following his first one-man exhibition in Sydney convinced him that his art could not flourish in Australia.

=== London ===
In March 1930 he left Australia to live permanently in London. He held one-man shows at the Beaux Arts Gallery, London (1930); in the studio of his colleague Francis Bacon (1930); at Bernheim-Jeune, Paris (1932); Mayor Gallery, London (1934); and at Calmann Gallery, London (1938). His work was also illustrated in several editions of Herbert Read's influential book Art Now. In 1931–32 he returned to Saint-Jean-de-Luz. During 1932–1934 he visited Compiègne. In October 1934 he established 'The School of Contemporary Painting and Drawing painting' with Martin Bloch at 130 Ebury Street [Victoria]. In 1936 he set up studio at 13 Eccleston Street, Westminster.

=== Patrick White ===
In 1936 De Maistre met the 18-years-younger novelist Patrick White. The two men never became lovers, but firm friends. In Patrick White's own words "He became what I most needed, an intellectual and aesthetic mentor". They had many similarities. They were both homosexual; they both felt like outsiders in their own families (for example De Maistre's family disapproved of his painting and described it as 'horrible'); as a result they both had ambivalent feelings about their families and backgrounds, yet both maintained close and lifelong links with their families, particularly their mothers. They also both appreciated the benefits of social standing and connections; and Christian symbolism and biblical themes are common in both artists' work. Patrick White dedicated his first novel Happy Valley (1939) to De Maistre, and acknowledged De Maistre's influence on his writing. He even went to Saint-Jean-de-Luz during the writing of the novel under encouragement from De Maistre. In 1947 De Maistre's painting Figure in a Garden (The Aunt) (1945) was used as the cover for the first edition of Patrick White's The Aunt's Story. Patrick White also bought many of De Maistre's paintings for himself. In 1974 Patrick White gave all his paintings by De Maistre to the Art Gallery of New South Wales.

In 1968, White wrote The Vivisector, a searing character portrait of an artist. Many people drew links to the Sydney painter John Passmore (1904–1984) and White's friend, the painter Sidney Nolan, but White denied these connections. Patrick White was an art collector who had, as a young man in London before World War II, been deeply impressed by his friends De Maistre and Bacon. Later White said he wished he had been an artist. White's elaborate, idiosyncratic prose was a writer's attempt to emulate painting. By the mid-1960s he had also become interested in encouraging dozens of young and less established artists, such as James Clifford, Erica McGilchrist, and Lawrence Daws.

== 1940s ==
In 1940 De Maistre started work for the French Section, Joint War Organization of the British Red Cross Society and the Order of St John, London. In 1942 he was posted to Foreign Relations Department, British Red Cross Society. During this time de Maistre scarcely painted. After World War II, however, he had become an artist of the establishment. He had no trouble selling his paintings, and continuing to accept private commissions for society portraits. His work was also part of the painting event in the art competition at the 1948 Summer Olympics.

Having many years previously changed the spelling of his surname to de Maistre, believing the modern spelling suited a modern painter, by the 1950s he had also added the name Laurent. He added this new name mistakenly believing he had royal blood through his grandfather Prosper de Mestre supposedly via Julie de St Laurent, mistress of Edward Duke of Kent, the father of Queen Victoria. He had also changed the spelling of Livingstone to Leviston and then to Leveson. Eventually he also added the name Joseph, in acknowledgment of a connexion with the philosopher Joseph de Maistre.

== 1950s ==
He exhibited with the Royal Academy of Arts from 1951 and was represented in Arts Council of Great Britain exhibitions. His work was bought for the Tate Gallery and other art museums, and was frequently discussed in the writings of Sir John Rothenstein.

In 1951 he was confirmed in the Roman Catholic faith. Religious subjects began after his conversion. His religious works stemmed from his profound Catholic belief in the truth of the images they represented, and his modern religious pictures were sought for public collections and exhibitions. In 1954 he began painting a series of Stations of the Cross for Westminster Cathedral. He also painted two triptychs for St Aidan's Church, East Acton. Besides religion his late painting often dwelt on interior intimacies of his studio home and its "artfully cluttered bric-à-brac". These included his finest works.

In 1954 he became a member of the London Group.

== 1960s ==
In 1960 the Whitechapel Gallery in London held a major retrospective to celebrate the work of de Maistre.

== Awards and death ==
In 1962 he was appointed a Commander of the Order of the British Empire (CBE).

On 1 March 1968, De Maistre died at his home at 13 Eccleston Street, Westminster.

== See also ==
- Australian art
- Enid de Chair
