= South Nowra =

- Suburb
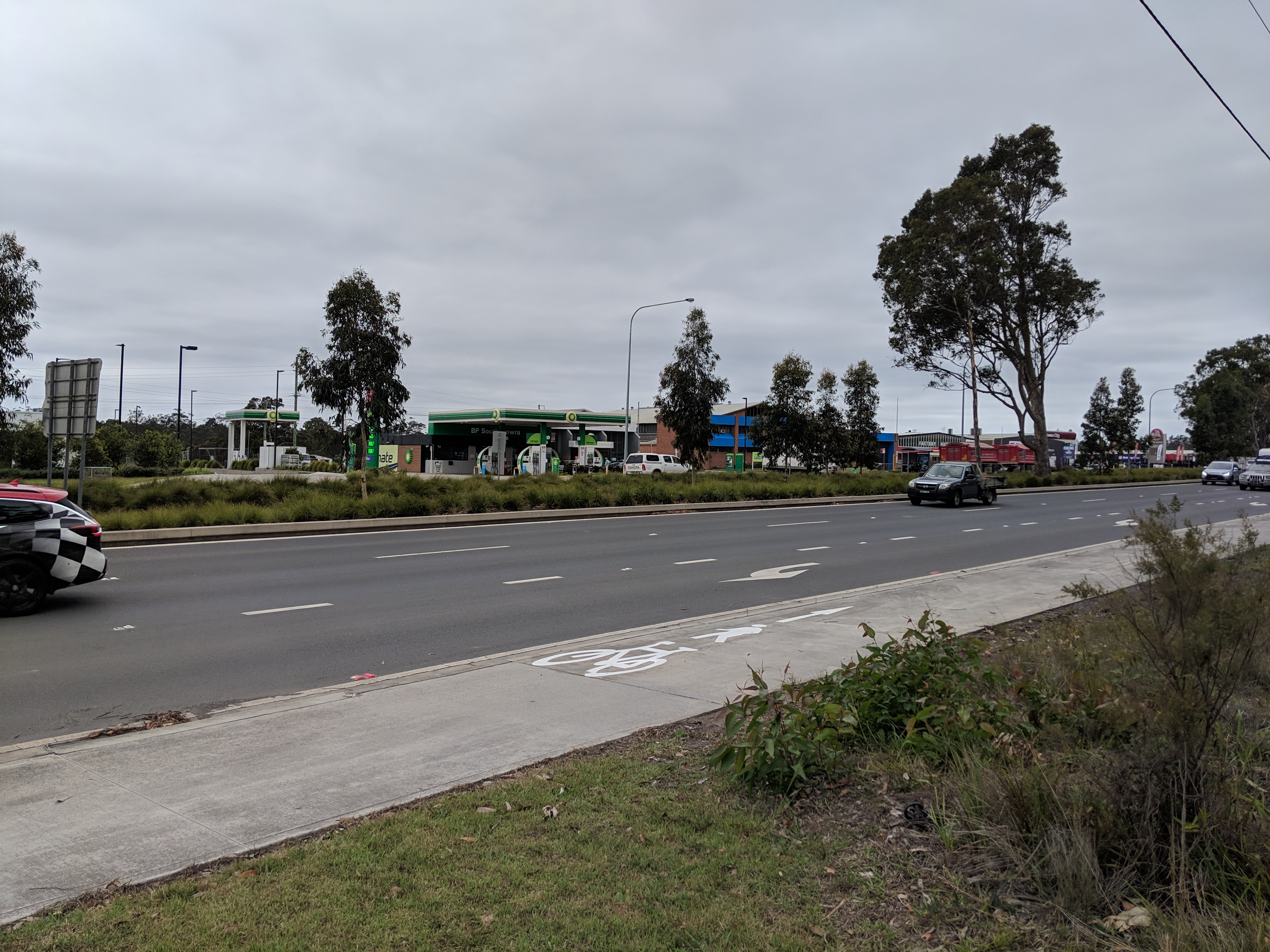
- Princes Highway, South Nowra

- Coordinates: 34°54′40″S 150°35′45″E
- Country: Australia
- State: New South Wales
- Region: South Coast
- LGA: City of Shoalhaven
- Location: 170 km (110 mi) S of Sydney; 6 km (3.7 mi) S of Nowra; 58 km (36 mi) N of Ulladulla

Government
  - State electorate: South Coast
  - Federal division: Gilmore
- Elevation: 41 m (135 ft)

Population
  - Total: 1,928 (2016 census)
- Postcode: 2541
- County: St Vincent
- Parish: Nowra
Suburbs around South Nowra
West Nowra	Nowra	Worrigee
Mundamia	South Nowra	Worrigee
Nowra Hill	Nowra Hill	Comberton

South Nowra is a suburb of Nowra in the City of Shoalhaven in New South Wales, Australia. It lies south of Nowra on both sides of the Princes Highway. It includes a strip of light industry along the highway. At the 2016 census, it had a population of 1,928.
