= The Shoalhaven Telegraph =

Australian newspaper

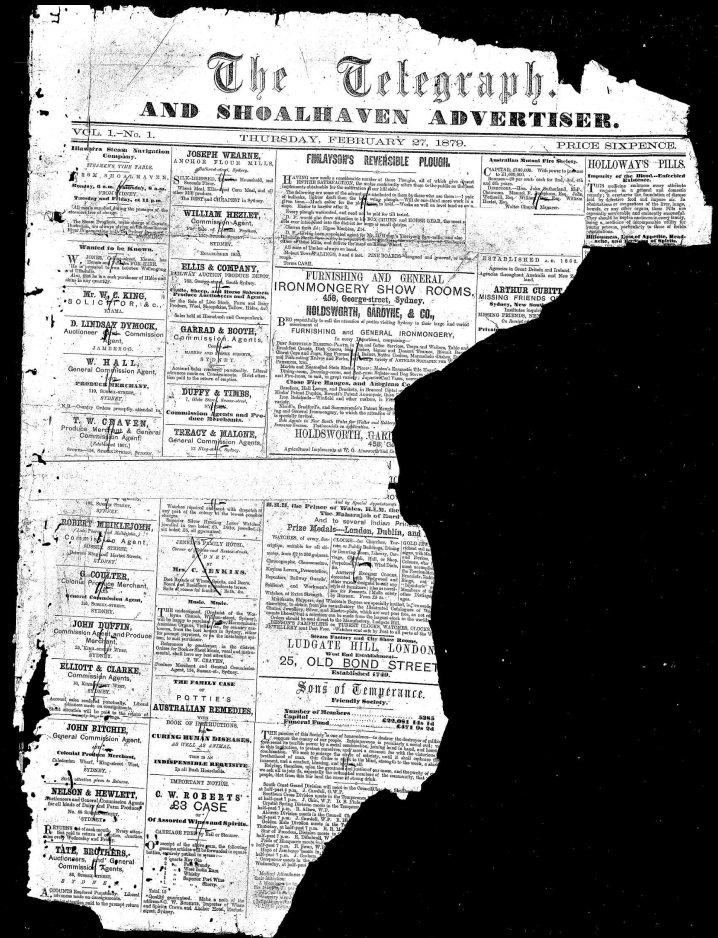
- The Telegraph and Shoalhaven Advertiser, 27 February 1879
- Type: Weekly newspaper
- Founder: Joseph Weston
- Founded: 1879
- Ceased publication: 1937
- Language: English
- City: Nowra, New South Wales
- Country: Australia

The Shoalhaven Telegraph was a weekly newspaper published in Nowra, New South Wales, Australia from 1879 until 1937. It was first published as The Telegraph and Shoalhaven Advertiser.

== History ==
The Telegraph and Shoalhaven Advertiser was first published by Joseph Weston on 27 February 1879 in competition with the Shoalhaven News. Weston installed his brother-in-law, John Maclean, as the newspaper's editor. The Telegraph's name was changed to The Shoalhaven Telegraph in 1881. The Telegraph was sold to Maclean in 1886, who in turn sold it to Henry Rauch in 1900. In 1937 the Telegraph was absorbed by the Shoalhaven News.

== Digitisation ==
The paper has been digitised as part of the Australian Newspapers Digitisation Program project of the National Library of Australia.

== See also ==
- List of newspapers in Australia
- List of newspapers in New South Wales
