= West Nowra =

- Suburb
- Coordinates: 34°53′22″S 150°35′00″E
- Country: Australia
- State: New South Wales
- Region: South Coast
- LGA: City of Shoalhaven
- Location: 4 km (2.5 mi) W of Nowra

Government
  - State electorate: Kiama
  - Federal division: Gilmore
- Elevation: 42 m (138 ft)

Population
  - Total: 1,504 (2021 census)
- Postcode: 2541
- County: St Vincent
- Parish: Nowra
Suburbs around West Nowra
Mundamia	North Nowra	North Nowra
Mundamia	West Nowra	Nowra
Mundamia	South Nowra	South Nowra

West Nowra is a suburb of Nowra in the City of Shoalhaven in New South Wales, Australia. It lies west of Nowra. At the 2021 census, it had a population of 1,504.
