= Nowra =

- Town
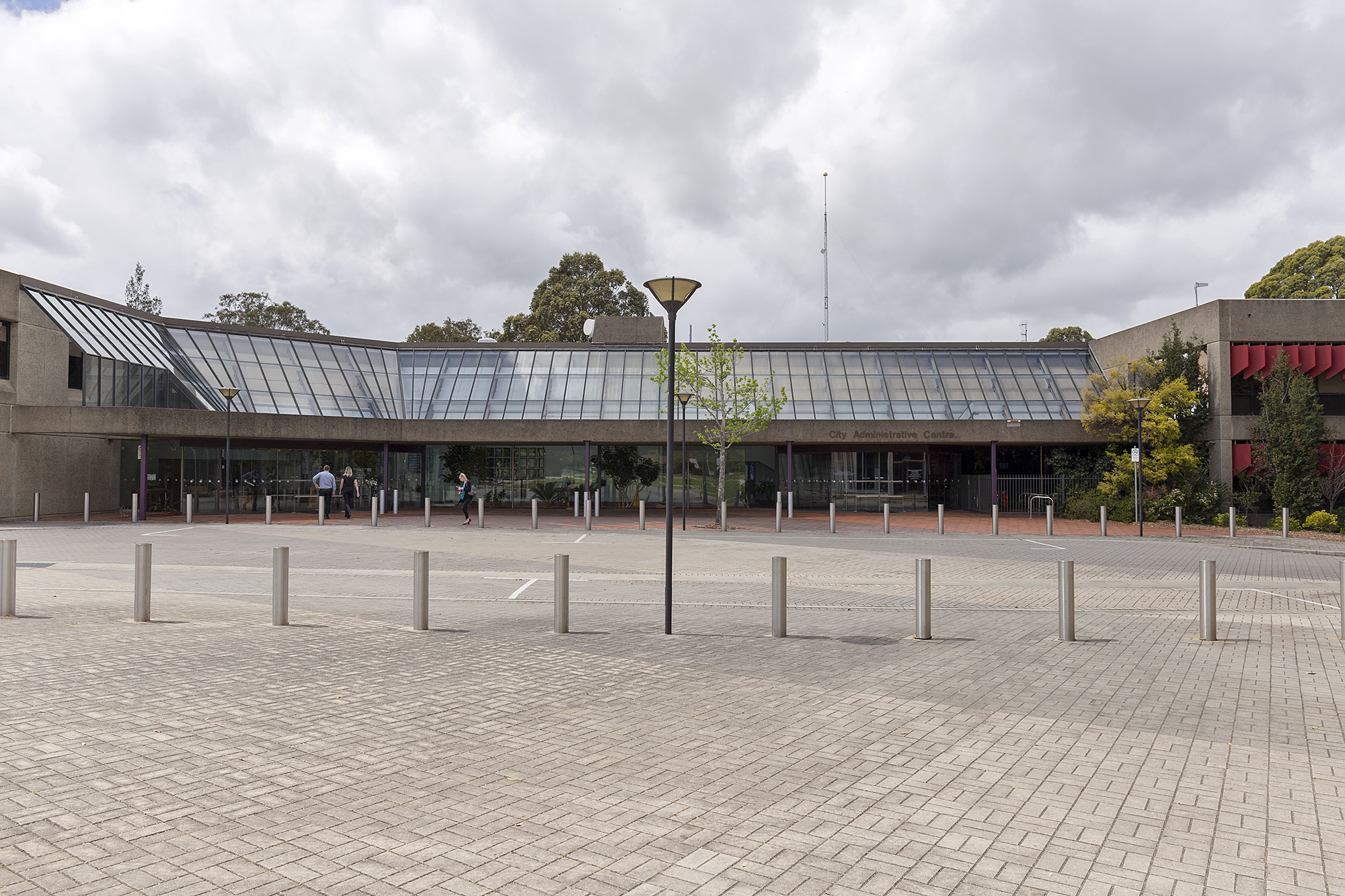
- Nowra City Administration centre

- Interactive map of Nowra
- Coordinates: 34°53′S 150°36′E
- Country: Australia
- State: New South Wales
- LGA: City of Shoalhaven
- Location: 160 km (99 mi) S of Sydney; 42 km (26 mi) SW of Kiama; 64 km (40 mi) N of Ulladulla; 128 km (80 mi) E of Goulburn; 192 km (119 mi) ENE of Canberra
- Established: 1852

Government
  - State electorate: South Coast
  - Federal division: Gilmore

Area
  - Total: 202.4 km^{2} (78.1 sq mi)
- Elevation: 9 m (30 ft)

Population
  - Total: 22,584 (2021)
  - Density: 212.6/km^{2} (551/sq mi)
- Time zone: UTC+10 (AEST)
  - Summer (DST): UTC+11 (AEDT)
- Postcode: 2541
- Mean max temp: 22.4 °C (72.3 °F)
- Mean min temp: 11.7 °C (53.1 °F)
- Annual rainfall: 1,026.1 mm (40.40 in)
Localities around Nowra
North Nowra	Bomaderry	Bolong
West Nowra	Nowra	Terara
Mundamia	South Nowra	Worrigee

Nowra (/naʊərə/ NOW-rə) is a city in the South Coast region of New South Wales, Australia. It is located 160 kilometres (99 mi) south-southwest of the state capital of Sydney (about 120 kilometres (75 mi) as the crow flies). As of the 2021 census, Nowra has an estimated population of 22,584. Situated in the southern reaches of the Sydney basin, Nowra is the seat and commercial centre of the City of Shoalhaven.

The region around Nowra is a farming community with a thriving dairy industry and a significant amount of state-owned forest land. It is also an increasingly popular retirement and leisure area for people from Canberra and Sydney. The naval air station HMAS Albatross is located about 10 kilometres (6.2 mi) south-west of Nowra.

== History ==
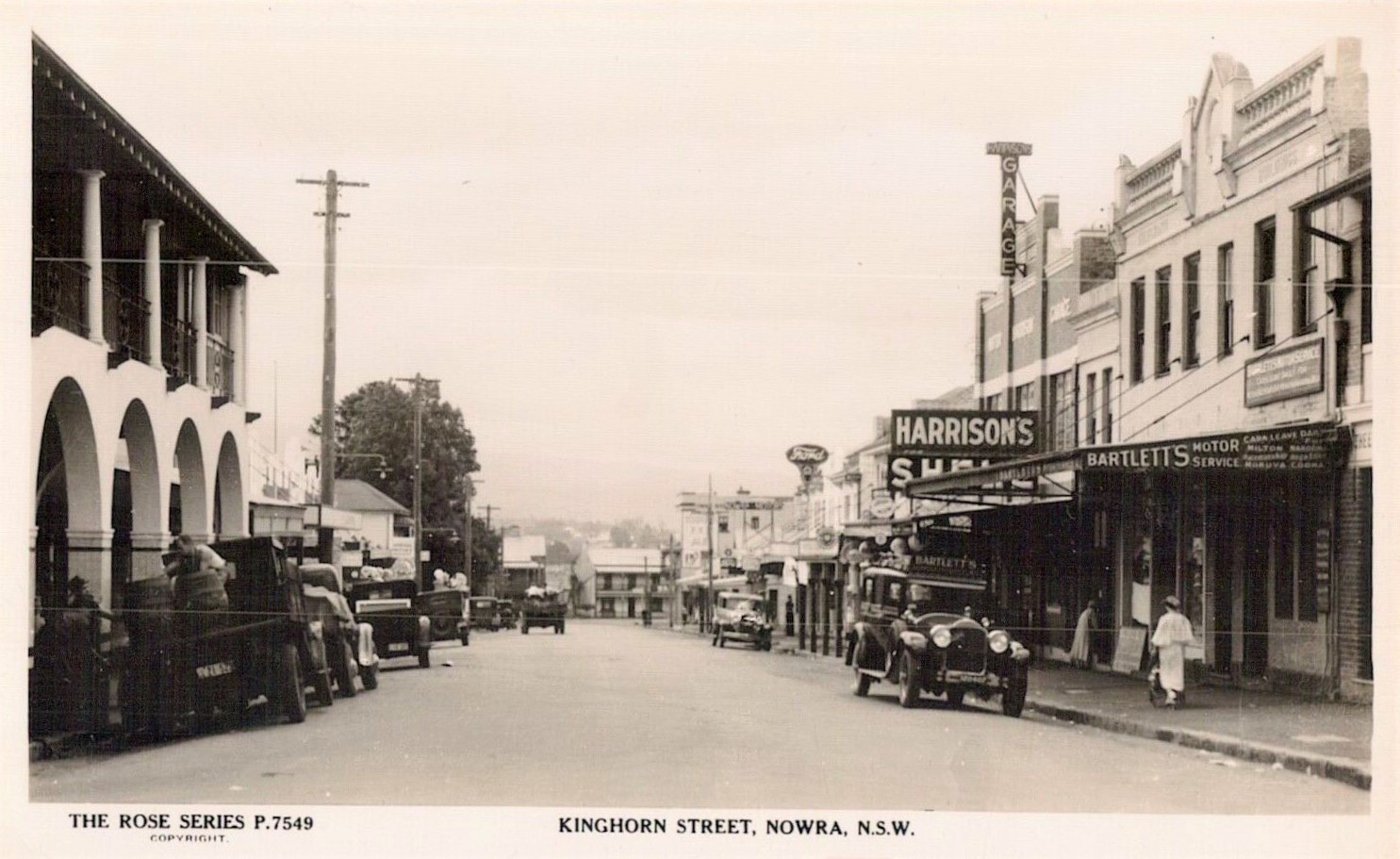
Kinghorn Street in 1930

Prior to European arrival, the part of the Nowra region south of the Shoalhaven river was inhabited by the Wandi-Wandandian tribe of the Yuin nation, while the region north of Shoalhaven was inhabited by the Dharawal people. The name Nowra, originally written by Europeans as 'nou-woo-ro' (pronounced Nowa Nowa by the Indigenous Australians of the area), is an Aboriginal word for the black cockatoo.

Circa 1824, ex-convict Mary Reibey applied for a land grant in the Burrier area, on the southern side of the Shoalhaven River. The Nowra township was officially recognised in 1852. Less than ten years later, in 1861, a postal service was established. In 1861, the racehorse Archer, which was trained in Nowra by Etienne de Mestre, won the first Melbourne Cup. Nowra was declared a town in 1885 and a city in 1979.

Bundanon Homestead

A major landmark in the area is the house Bundanon, which renowned Australian artist Arthur Boyd and his wife Yvonne donated to the people of Australia in 1993 along with an adjoining property that had been previously owned by Boyd's brother-in-law, the equally famous Australian artist Sidney Nolan. Bundanon began as a single-storey weatherboard structure built around 1840. In 1866, a two-storey sandstone house, made of locally quarried stone, was built immediately in front of the original weatherboard house. The sandstone house features timber verandas and is now listed on the Register of the National Estate.

== Heritage listings ==
Nowra has a number of heritage-listed sites, including:

- Pleasant Way: Graham Lodge
- 35 West Street: Meroogal
- 84 Plunkett Street Nowra public school

== Geography ==
Along the north of Nowra is the Shoalhaven River, which formerly hosted the Australian National wakeboarding championships and is a popular fishing location. The Nowra Bridge connects it to North Nowra and Bomaderry. The Shoalhaven River is a freshwater river, however it does become brackish near the township. although it does not flow into the sea. The Shoalhaven River meets the sea through the canal that joins the Shoalhaven and Crookhaven Rivers, which was dug by convicts under the direction of local entrepreneur and pioneer Alexander Berry.

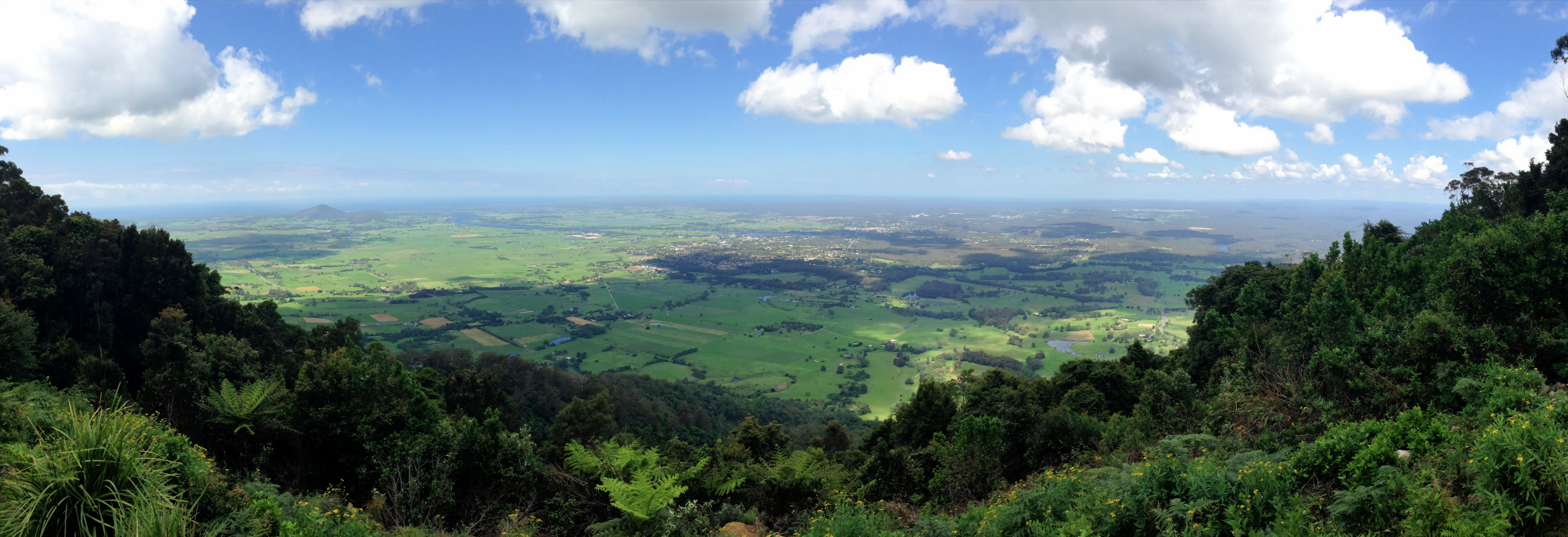
Nowra area from Cambewarra Lookout

=== Climate ===
Nowra possesses a humid subtropical climate (Köppen: Cfa), with very warm, wet summers and mild, relatively dry winters. Compared with nearby Wollongong and Kiama which have an oceanic climate, Nowra has slightly warmer summers due to its inland location, thus qualifying it as humid subtropical climate. Average maxima vary from 27.6 °C (81.7 °F) in January to 16.8 °C (62.2 °F) in July, while average minima fluctuate between 16.8 °C (62.2 °F) in January and 6.8 °C (44.2 °F) in July. Annual precipitation is moderately high (averaging 1,026.1 mm (40.40 in)), and is spread across 86.7 precipitation days (over 1.0 mm (0.039 in)). Due to its position on the leeward side of the Great Dividing Range, Nowra experiences a foehn effect, particularly in late winter and spring. The town experiences 99.6 clear days and 127.4 cloudy days per annum. Extreme temperatures have ranged from 45.6 °C (114.1 °F) on 21 December 2019 to −0.9 °C (30.4 °F) on 24 August 2002.

Climate data for Nowra (HMAS Albatross) (34.95°S 150.54°E, 109 m AMSL) (2000−2024, sun 1965−1997)
Month	Jan	Feb	Mar	Apr	May	Jun	Jul	Aug	Sep	Oct	Nov	Dec	Year
Record high °C (°F)	45.4 (113.7)	42.8 (109.0)	38.6 (101.5)	34.6 (94.3)	27.4 (81.3)	24.1 (75.4)	26.0 (78.8)	28.1 (82.6)	36.3 (97.3)	37.1 (98.8)	41.4 (106.5)	45.6 (114.1)	45.6 (114.1)
Mean daily maximum °C (°F)	27.6 (81.7)	26.4 (79.5)	25.2 (77.4)	22.9 (73.2)	19.7 (67.5)	17.0 (62.6)	16.8 (62.2)	18.4 (65.1)	21.1 (70.0)	23.2 (73.8)	24.7 (76.5)	26.1 (79.0)	22.4 (72.4)
Mean daily minimum °C (°F)	16.8 (62.2)	16.7 (62.1)	15.3 (59.5)	12.5 (54.5)	9.4 (48.9)	7.7 (45.9)	6.8 (44.2)	7.0 (44.6)	8.8 (47.8)	10.9 (51.6)	13.5 (56.3)	14.9 (58.8)	11.7 (53.0)
Record low °C (°F)	8.6 (47.5)	9.5 (49.1)	7.2 (45.0)	3.7 (38.7)	3.0 (37.4)	1.3 (34.3)	−0.5 (31.1)	−0.9 (30.4)	2.4 (36.3)	2.7 (36.9)	5.7 (42.3)	7.4 (45.3)	−0.9 (30.4)
Average precipitation mm (inches)	76.5 (3.01)	138.7 (5.46)	138.2 (5.44)	75.4 (2.97)	58.5 (2.30)	106.3 (4.19)	78.5 (3.09)	74.5 (2.93)	43.1 (1.70)	75.9 (2.99)	87.7 (3.45)	72.2 (2.84)	1,026.1 (40.40)
Average precipitation days (≥ 1.0 mm)	8.0	9.1	9.5	7.1	5.5	6.8	5.7	5.4	6.2	7.3	8.2	7.9	86.7
Average afternoon relative humidity (%)	57	63	59	57	55	56	53	46	47	52	56	55	55
Average dew point °C (°F)	15.3 (59.5)	16.2 (61.2)	14.3 (57.7)	11.3 (52.3)	8.2 (46.8)	6.4 (43.5)	4.9 (40.8)	4.1 (39.4)	6.1 (43.0)	8.4 (47.1)	12.5 (54.5)	13.2 (55.8)	10.1 (50.1)
Mean monthly sunshine hours	207.7	186.5	198.4	201.0	182.9	171.0	207.7	232.5	222.0	223.2	219.0	226.3	2,478.2
Percentage possible sunshine	47	49	52	60	57	58	67	69	62	55	52	50	57
Source: Bureau of Meteorology

Historical population
Year	Pop.	±%
1921	2,202	—
1933	2,978	+35.2%
1947	3,551	+19.2%
1954	5,981	+68.4%
1961	6,221	+4.0%
1966	9,633	+54.8%
1971	12,873	+33.6%
1976	15,496	+20.4%
1981	17,887	+15.4%
1986	19,553	+9.3%
1991	21,942	+12.2%
1996	23,823	+8.6%
2001	24,700	+3.7%
2006	27,478	+11.2%
2011	27,988	+1.9%
2016	30,853	+10.2%
2021	33,583	+8.8%
Source: Australian Bureau of Statistics data.

== Demographics ==
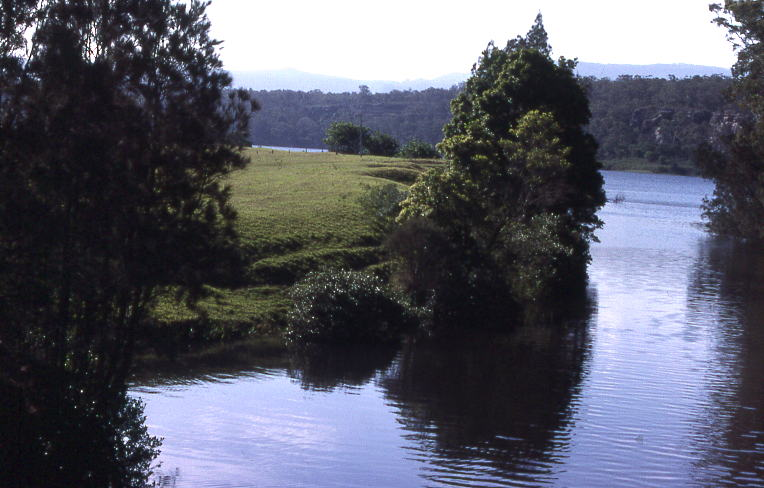
Nowra Creek

According to the 2021 census, Nowra has a population of 22,584. This covers suburbs only south of the Shoalhaven River. The population is slightly younger than the state and country as a whole, with an average age of 37 compared to 38 for both Australia and New South Wales. However, the population is bimodally distributed, with a larger percentage of children and the elderly than the state and national averages. 79.7% of the population were born in Australia and 82.1% speak only English at home, both above the state and national averages.

Nowra has a lower level of tertiary education than typical for the state and nation. Only 15% of the population of Nowra hold a tertiary qualification, compared to 23.3% of Australia and 23.8% of New South Wales.

The top five reported ancestries in Nowra at the 2021 census were Australian (40.9%), English (37.7%), Australian Aboriginal (10%), Irish (9.5%), and Scottish (8.3%). Most (63%) people had both parents born in Australia, higher than the state and national averages.

The population of the suburb of Nowra (central Nowra) at the 2021 census was 9,956. The Australian Bureau of statistics also recognises a larger built-up area including suburbs north of the Shoalhaven river, North Nowra-Bomaderry, which had a population of 16,098 at the 2021 census.

== Economy ==
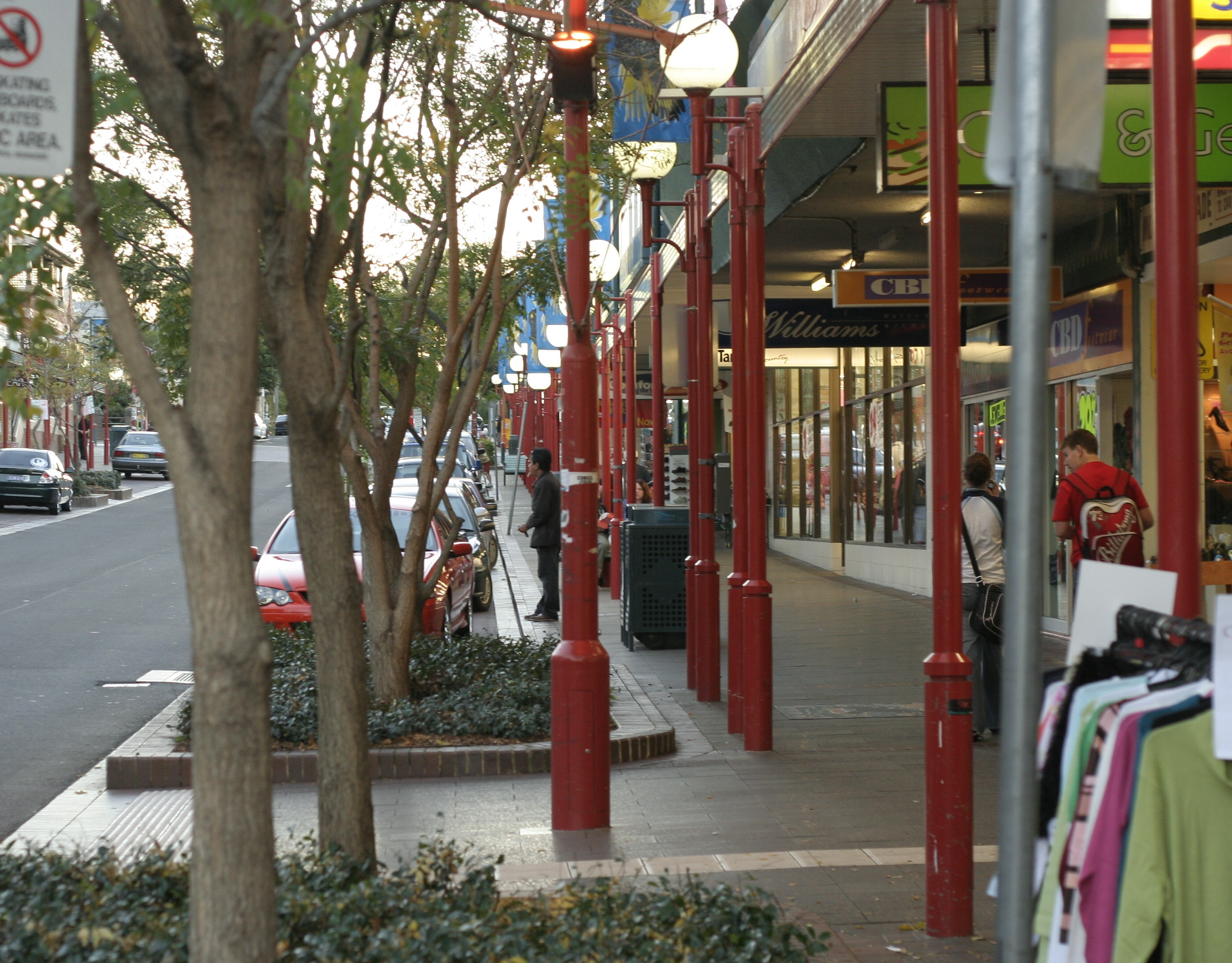
Nowra shops (Junction Street)

Nowra Town Hall was built in 1948 and is in the Central Business District. This district contains many services, including banks, health services and a library.

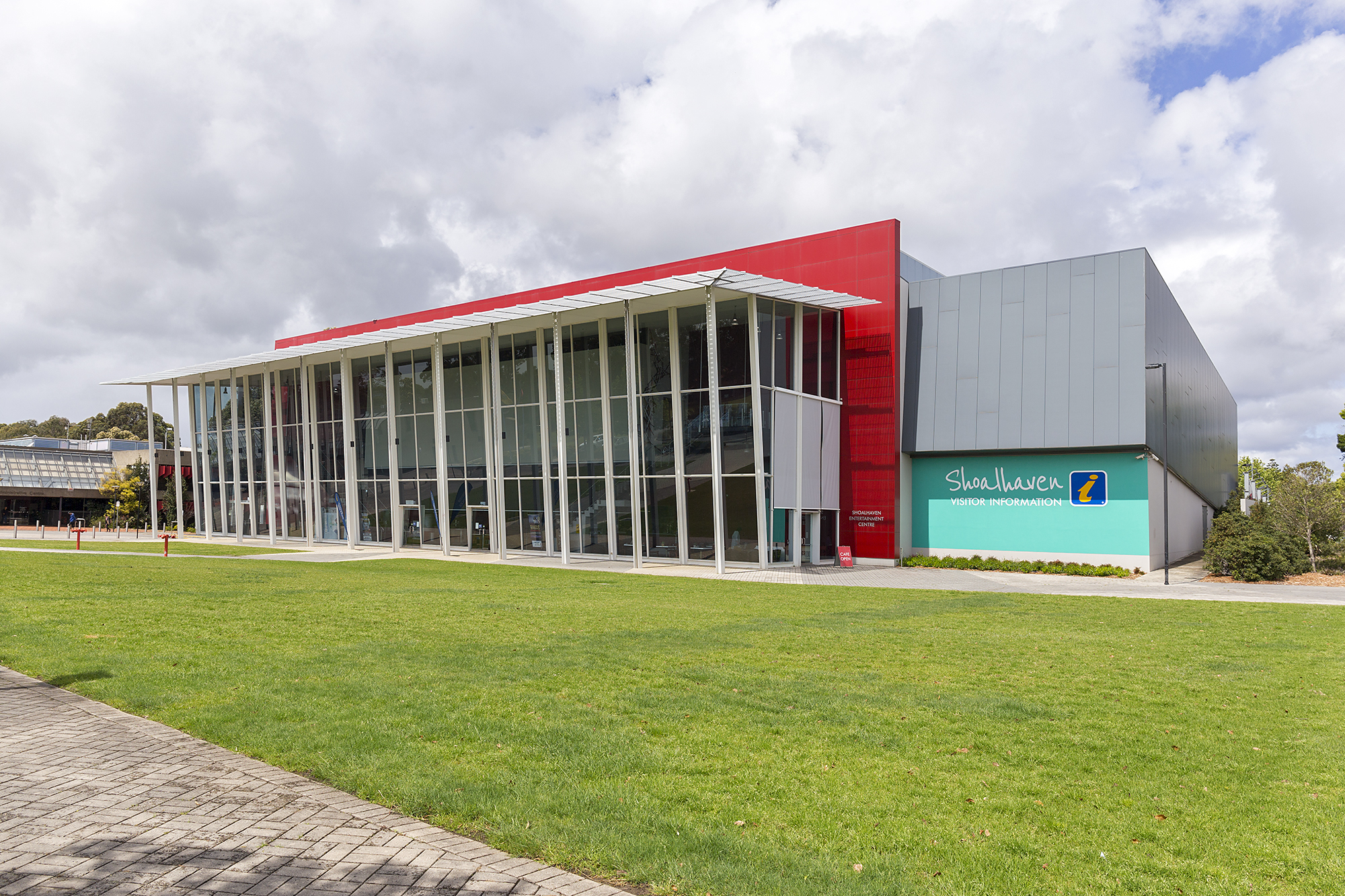
Shoalhaven Entertainment Centre

Nowra has a growing tourist industry, especially in the summer months, when visitors (mostly from Sydney and Canberra) flock to the beaches to enjoy swimming, surfing, fishing, shopping, and relaxing in the restaurants and cafés.

Nowra sits in the Shoalhaven region, where there are several vineyards.

== Education ==
Nowra has three public high schools: Nowra High School, Shoalhaven High School and Bomaderry High School. There are also several non-government schools, three of which are religiously affiliated:

- Nowra Christian School: a K–12 Christian-based school located in South Nowra
- Nowra Anglican College: a K–12 Anglican college in Bomaderry
- St John the Evangelist Catholic High School: a Catholic systemic high school on the outskirts of Nowra, affiliated with St Michael's Catholic Primary School in Nowra

The district also has an independent school of special assistance. The Shoalhaven River College commenced classes in 2019 and enrols 60 students in years 9–12 in the mainstream curriculum.

There are seven public primary schools in the Nowra area: East Nowra Public School, Nowra Public School, Bomaderry Public School, Illaroo Road Public School, North Nowra Public School, Nowra Hill Public School, and Terara Public School.

The University of Wollongong has a campus in Nowra, and there is a campus of TAFE NSW Illawarra Institute in Bomaderry.

== Health ==
There are two hospitals in Nowra: the Shoalhaven District Memorial Hospital, which is a hub for oncology services, and Nowra Private Hospital.

== Media ==
Nowra is served by various radio stations:

- ABC Illawarra (Regional)
- Wave FM (Commercial)
- i98FM (Commercial)
- Triple U FM (Community)
- 2ST (Community)
- Power FM (Community)

Nowra also receives 5 free-to-air television channels from Knights Hill, commercial channels Seven, WIN (Nine) and Network 10, and public broadcasters ABC and SBS. Due to tropospheric ducting from Newcastle in the Shoalhaven area via Knights Hill, a translator site at Cambewarra Mountain in Nowra North is an alternative source of television reception and assists those affected by the Newcastle ducting.

Local newspapers is served by The Shoalhaven and Nowra News and South Coast Register.

== Sports ==
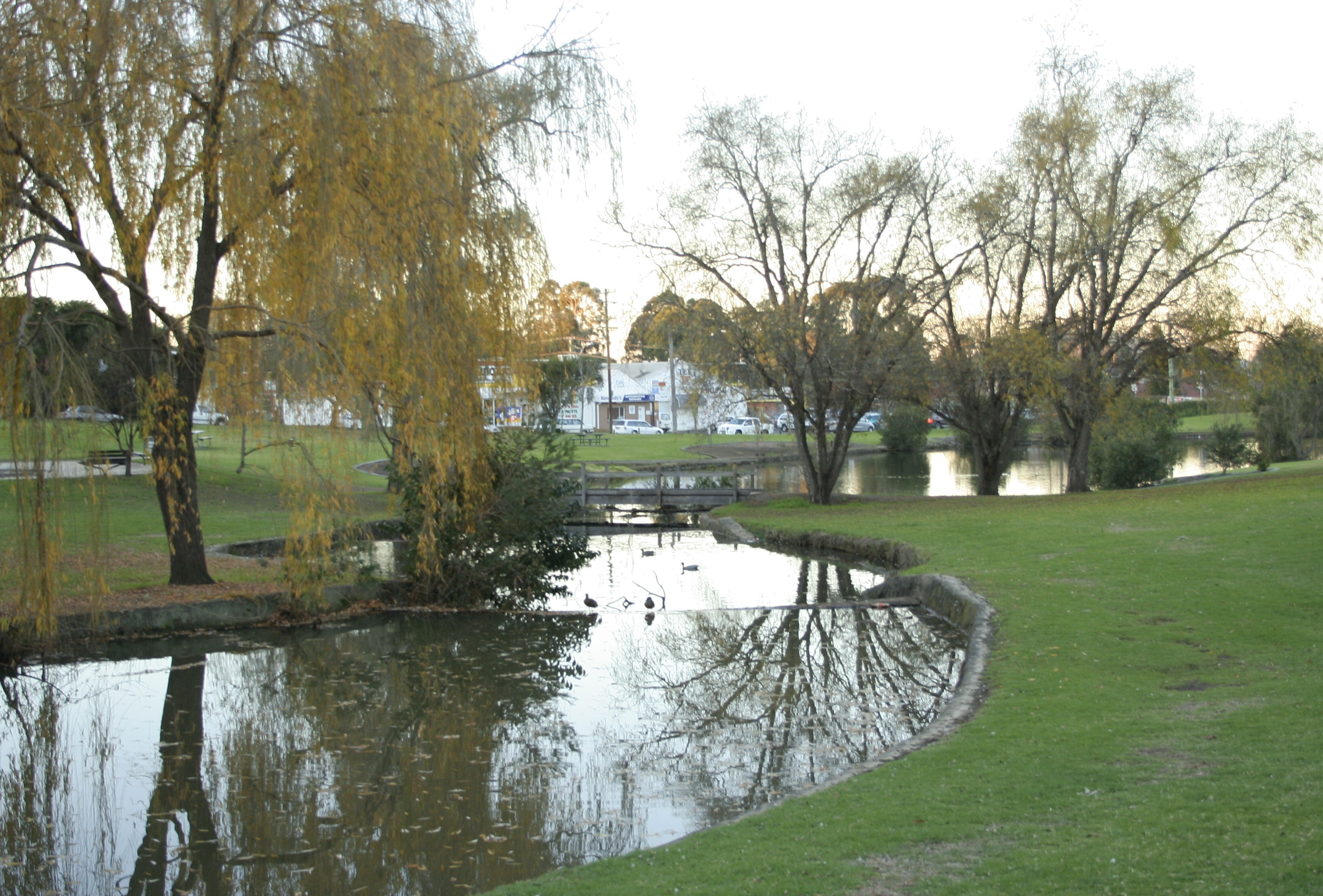
Marriott Park

The four major codes of football in Australia are all popular in the Nowra area. Rugby league was traditionally represented by the Nowra Warriors and Bomaderry Swamp Rats, however, at the end of 2007 these teams merged to form the Shoalhaven Jets Rugby League Football Club. Other rugby league teams in the Shoalhaven area include the St Georges Basin Dragons, Culburra Dolphins, Sussex Inlet Panthers and Berry Magpies, all of whom source some of their players from Nowra. All of these clubs compete in the Group 7 Rugby League competition.

Rugby union is represented by the Shoalhaven Rugby Club, who play out of Rugby Park in South Nowra. The club won the 2008 premiership in the Illawarra district competition, and has produced international and provincial players such as Andrew Walker and Alex Kanaar.

Australian rules football is played by two clubs from the Shoalhaven area, with the Bomaderry Tigers playing at Artie Smith Oval. Further south, the Bay and Basin Bombers play at the Leisure Centre at Vincentia. These two clubs are both members of the South Coast AFL, fielding junior and senior teams.

The Shoalhaven Mariners were established in 2006 and represent the area in the sport of baseball. The team plays home matches out of Fred Finch Park in Berkeley, Wollongong. Baseball has a new venue at the South Nowra Soccer Complex. The Shoalhaven Tigers represent the area in the New South Wales State Basketball League and have won several championships from 1988 until 2007.

Archer was an Australian thoroughbred racehorse trained in the Nowra area who won the first and the second Melbourne Cups in 1861 and 1862. He won both Cups by a significant margin. Archer is one of only five horses to have won the Melbourne Cup on two or more occasions, and one of only four horses to have won two successive Cups.

== Public transport ==
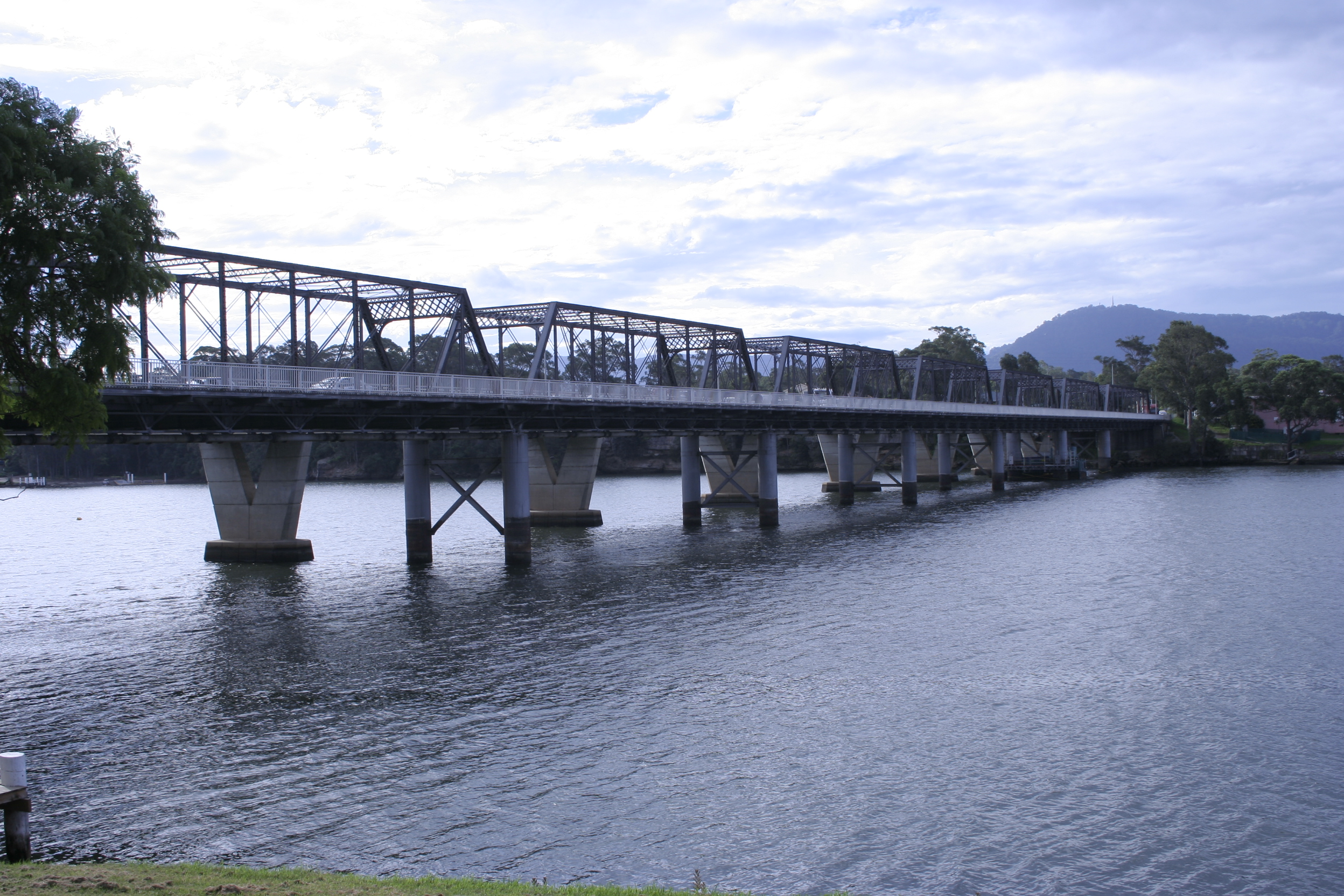
Nowra Bridge

Nowra Coaches operates services from Nowra to Bomaderry, Huskisson, Vincentia and Jervis Bay. Shoal Bus operates services from Nowra to Berry, Gerringong and Sussex Inlet. Premier Motor Service operates express services along the Princes Highway from Sydney to Eden that call at Nowra.

Nowra has no direct rail connection, but the Illawarra railway line terminates at nearby Bomaderry railway station with Sydney Trains operating services to Kiama and Sydney.

== Notable people ==
- Arthur Boyd, artist
- Tony Branson, Australian rugby league international
- Deborah Cheetham, Indigenous Australian opera singer.
- Ian Davis, Australian cricket international
- Jeff Dowdell, basketball (Cairns Taipans) player
- Adam Federici, football (soccer) player
- Christie Hayes, actress
- Blake Horton, football (soccer) player
- William Kamm, also known as 'Little Pebble', disgraced religious leader
- Nic Maddinson, cricketer
- Bruce McGuire, Australian rugby league international and NSW State of Origin player
- Frank Moorhouse, writer
- Michael O'Connor, dual international rugby league and union player
- Ashley Paske, actor. Appeared in Neighbours (1989–1991).
- Karen Phillips, swimmer
- Rodney Rude, comedian
- Marty Sheargold, stand-up comedian, radio broadcaster, and actor.
- Arron Spiessberger-Parker, 1500m runner
- Jim Stanbury, World Professional Sculling Champion 1891–1896 and 1905–1906.
- Rohan Taylor, national swimming coach
- Corey Tutt, founder of DeadlyScience
- Andrew Walker, dual international rugby league and union player

== Attractions ==
- Shoalhaven Regional Gallery
- Fleet Air Arm Museum
- hanging rock lookout
- Nowra farmer's market
- Bens walk
