= Arron Spiessberger-Parker =

Australian middle-distance runner

Personal information
- Nickname: 3:30
- Nationality: Australian
- Born: Arron Spiessberger-Parker; 13 January 1996 (age 30) Nowra, New South Wales
- Education: Shoalhaven High School
- Years active: Current

Sport
- Country: Australia
- Sport: Middle-distance running
- Events: 800, 1500 and 5000 metres
- Updated on 14 April 2016

Arron Spiessberger-Parker (born 13 January 1996) is an Australian middle-distance runner. He was the 2015 national champion for the 5000m at the 2015 Australian Junior Athletics Championships.

== Biography ==
Parker grew up in Nowra, and his first athletics club was Nowra Athletics club.
