= The Shoalhaven and Nowra News =

Newspaper in New South Wales, Australia

The Shoalhaven and Nowra News is an English language newspaper published in Nowra, New South Wales, Australia. It has previously been titled the Shoalhaven News and The Shoalhaven News and South Coast Districts Advertiser .

== History ==
The paper began in 1871 as Shoalhaven News and was published by Charles Isaac Watson. This publication ceased (possibly 1890) and was continued by The Shoalhaven News and South Coast Districts Advertiser in 1891, published by C.J.B. Watson. It ceased in September 1937 and changed its title back to Shoalhaven News, published by H. Cecil Rauch and Ray Rauch. This publication also absorbed the Shoalhaven Telegraph and ran from October 1937 until December 1945. The paper changed to its current name The Shoalhaven and Nowra News in January 1946 and is published by F. & J. G. Hanley.

== Digitisation ==
The various versions of the paper have been digitised as part of the Australian Newspapers Digitisation Program project hosted by the National Library of Australia.

== See also ==
- List of newspapers in New South Wales
- List of newspapers in Australia

== Bibliography ==
- Country conscience : a history of the New South Wales provincial press, 1841-1995 / by Rod Kirkpatrick, Canberra City, A.C.T. : Infinite Harvest Publishing, 2000
- Looking good : the changing appearance of Australian newspapers / by Victor Isaacs, for the Australian Newspapers History Group, Middle Park, Qld. : Australian Newspaper History Group, 2007.
- Press timeline : Select chronology of significant Australian press events to 2011 / Compiled by Rod Kirkpatrick for the Australian Newspaper History Group
- Australian Newspaper History : A Bibliography / Compiled by Victor Isaacs, Rod Kirkpatrick and John Russell, Middle Park, Qld. : Australian Newspaper History Group, 2004.
- Newspapers in Australian libraries : a union list. 4th ed.
