= Graham Lodge =

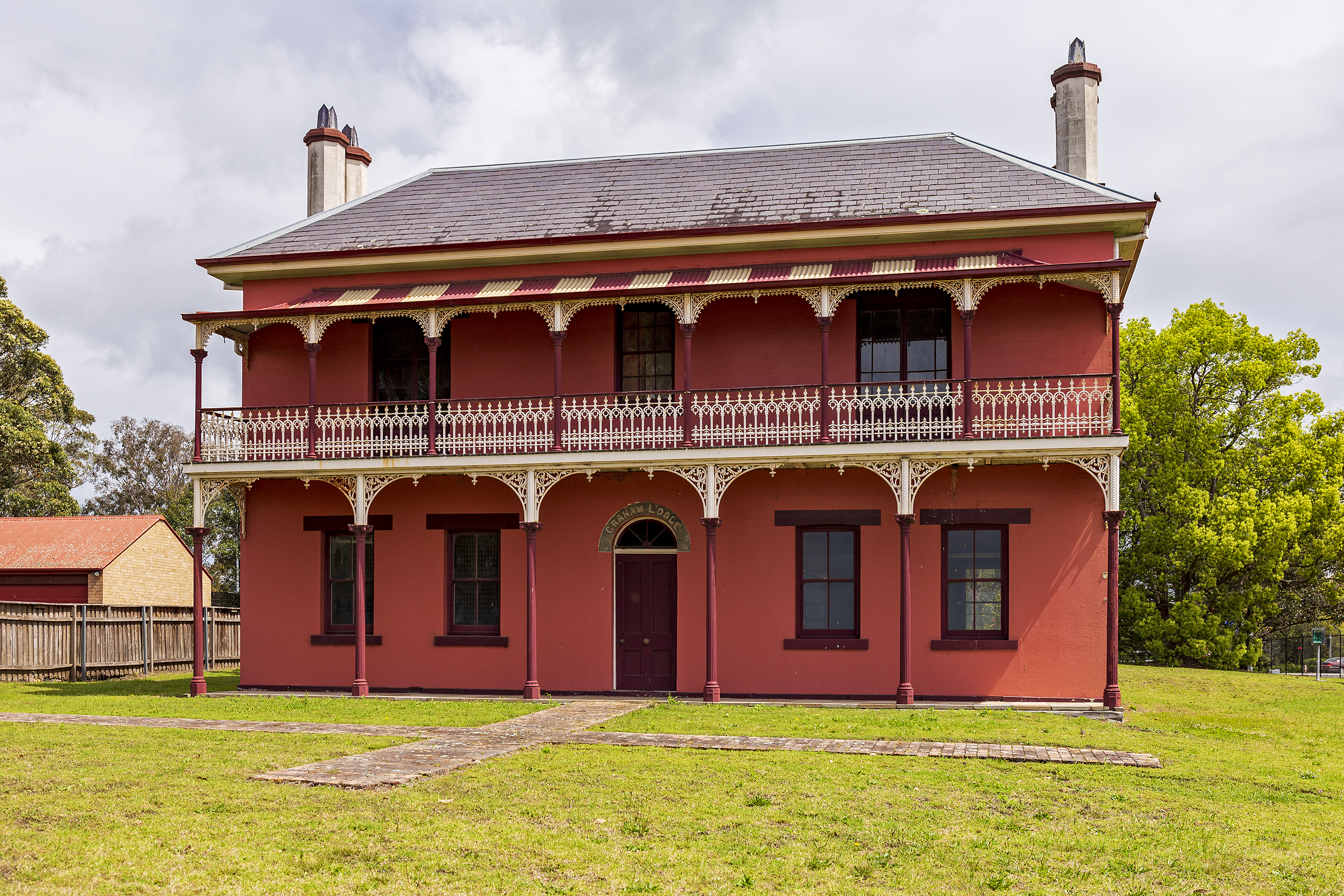

- Location within New South Wales Location within Australia
- 34.8674°S 150.6032°E
- Location: Pleasant Way, Nowra, City of Shoalhaven, New South Wales, Australia

History
- Built: 1860–1861

Site notes
- Owner: Shoalhaven City Council

New South Wales Heritage Register
- Official name: Graham Lodge; Prague Lodge; Nowra Bomaderry Leagues Club; Greenhills; Warragee
- Type: state heritage (complex / group)
- Designated: 4 June 2004
- Reference no.: 1699
- Type: Other – Community Facilities
- Category: Community Facilities
- Builders: Charles Moore, stonemason, and Willet Burry, carpenter

Graham Lodge is a heritage-listed homestead in Nowra, a city in the South Coast region of New South Wales, Australia. It was built from 1860 to 1861 by stonemason Charles Moore and carpenter Willet Burry. Later used as a function center and leagues club, it has been historically known as Greenhills, Warragee, Prague Lodge and later as the now-defunct Nowra Bomaderry Leagues Club. The property is owned by Shoalhaven City Council. It was added to the New South Wales State Heritage Register on 4 June 2004.

== History ==
Historical context for Graham Lodge

Aboriginal people are understood to have inhabited the Shoalhaven region for at least 21,000 years. Sue Wesson's atlas (2000) identified the language spoken by Aboriginal groups in the Shoalhaven as Tharawal, suggesting they would have identified with the Wodi Wodi people, who formed part of the Yuin linguistic group.

Europeans were slow to settle the Shoalhaven area because of sand and surf obstructing the opening of the river, first noted by George Bass in 1797. The first documented European visitors to the region were Lieutenant Kent and G. Evans, who anchored their boat at Jervis Bay in 1805 and walked to the Shoalhaven, some 30 kilometres to the south, where they found a small boat (presumably made by Aboriginal people) and used it to explore the river. From 1811 cedar-cutters began transporting wood from the Shoalhaven to Sydney by boat but encountered resistance from local Aboriginal people, on whom they were reported to have had "corrupting influence".

Several landholdings along the Shoalhaven were granted for agricultural and pastoral estates in the early nineteenth century. By 1822 when Alexander Berry settled as the first documented settler in the region, the cedar-cutters no longer frequented the area "as the natives either killed all the sawyers or forced them away". Berry left detailed notes about individual Aboriginal people he encountered and customs he observed, including comments on five clans associated with the lower Shoalhaven: the Shoalhaven, the Numba, the Broughton Creek, the Woregy and the Murroo. Berry estimated the population of these clans for the Census of 1834 at 150 people, however these numbers would have already been affected by disease and displacement. According to Goulding and Schell (2002, 20) Berry's estate:

'relied enormously on Aboriginal labour... Showing Berry where to locate his farm, cutting roads, (enabling Berry to bring cattle form Illawarra), conveying stores up the hill to his house, undertaking domestic chores, crewing his vessel and assisting in bringing down cattle from Sydney.'

In 1843 William Graham's early home at Greenhills was noted as the only residence in the vicinity of present-day Nowra. By 1856 Greenhills supported five stores, at least three hotels, a butcher and slaughtering business, a post office, school, church and private burial ground. The government town of Nowra was surveyed in the 1850s but only became the main settlement in the area after 1870 when a series of floods encouraged a general shift away from the riverside settlements. The construction of a bridge across the Shoalhaven in 1881 brought the main road into the district near to the house, while urbanisation and economic expansion increased after 1893 with the establishment of a railway connection to Sydney terminating at Bomaderry, just over the bridge.

Establishing Greenhills

In 1826, just four years after Berry, emancipated convict William Graham arrived in the Shoalhaven together with his wife Margaret and children Jane, William, John and James, and took up the unoccupied Butler's Grant of 100 acres (40 hectares) on the southern banks of the Shoalhaven, in a holding that became known as Greenhills (it has also been called Warragee). The following year Graham's two sons, William and James, took up John Layton's unoccupied 640 acres (260 hectares) land grant adjoining Butler's Grant, significantly expanding the Greenhills estate. The land adjoined Prosper de Mestre's small estate of Terara and Alexander Berry's huge estate of Jindyandy/Pyree (which had increased from an original grant of 14,000 acres or 6,257 hectares to 75,000 or 30,351 hectares in 1890). The 1828 NSW Census records William Graham living in the Illawarra, on land including 50 acres (20 hectares) that were cleared and 20 acres (8.1 hectares) cultivated; he had 50 head of cattle (1828 Census of NSW, Archives Office NSW). His letter of 1829 to the colonial secretary Alexander McLeay explained:

'It is now three years or thereabouts since first settled myself here for the purpose of being near my two sons, who had previously obtained orders for a small grant of land each and I have already been at a considerable expense in clearing off the land, erecting a cottage, and making stockyards etc and I have hitherto succeeded in procuring a small herd of cattle and cultivating a small portion of land for the support of my family...' (3-D exhibitions, 2000, 15)

To help clear and cultivate the land, some of the property was leased to tenant farmers brought out by Graham from Britain in 1841. Heritage Archaeology state that:

'Entries in the Greenhills Account Book relate the association of William and James Graham with many bounty immigrant families living in tenanted houses on the Graham's Greenhills estate... These families included domestic servants, blacksmiths, tanners, brick-makers and labourers. Their physical contribution to the development of Greenhills was substantial. Several historical paintings by Samuel Elyard depict the Greenhills estate and the outbuildings... The Greenhills cultural landscape represents an example of the early and ambitious attempts at settlement on the south coast of New South Wales'.

Several sources of information do suggest that Greenhills was a contact site between Europeans and Aboriginal people in the area. These sources include: archaeological evidence of flaked tools being found in the same or higher ground level as European implements, paintings depicting Aboriginal people camped in the Graham Lodge area, a contemporary historical account of Aboriginal people being employed and working on the property and historical accounts of Aboriginal people being present on the property. Although there are no entries in the Greenhills Account Book 1848–1854 indicating any transactions with Aboriginal people, Heritage Archaeology suggests that economic exchanges probably took place under barter agreements, possibly exchanging labour for sugar, tobacco, flour or blankets. On the other hand, there is documented evidence that the original grantee, emancipist William Graham, had abusive relationships with Aboriginal people before his time at Greenhills. Heritage Archaeology reports that the Colonial Secretary Index 1788–1825 for 5 June 1822 made several references to his earlier activities at Five Islands, Illawarra:

- "MURRAY, Aborigine; of Five Islands, Illawarra; Assisting William Graham to track Aborigines".
- 'CONTA CONTA, Aborigine of Five Islands, Illawarra, who was accused of stealing corn, and was maimed by William Graham.'
- 'NOLLOGER, Aborigine of Five Islands, Illawarra. Mentioned in the deposition of William Graham [Jnr.] re charges against his father, William Graham, for maiming a black native. Graham severed the hand of an Aborigine who subsequently died.'

No such records of any similar incidents have so far been found in relation to the Greenhills estate.

Building Graham Lodge

The original grantee William Graham died at Greenhills in September 1852 and was buried in the family cemetery. After his father's death, James Graham took over the running of the estate and, as executor of his father's will, divided the estate between the family members. James retained the original 100 acre grant and house, and he and his wife Mary (née Gardner) purchased more land at Greenhills and nearby. James and Mary had six children and it was soon apparent that the older house was too small for his growing family. James contracted Charles Moore, stonemason and bricklayer, and Willet Burrey, carpenter, of Nowra, to erect a new house on the estate. It was commenced in January 1860 and completed in May 1861. James was elected to the first Shoalhaven council in 1859 and became its first Mayor in 1860. Graham's powerful neighbours, the Berrys, had opposed the formation of this municipal government.

The 1997 Shoalhaven Heritage Study identified the majority of early buildings in the Shoalhaven district as being of vernacular idiom and form. The introduction of architectural concepts and design by recognised architects such as Thomas Rowe, John Horbury Hunt, Howard Joseland and Cyril Blacket began only in the 1870s with the construction of a number of churches by Horbury Hunt in Kangaroo Valley and Nowra. "Polite" residential design as opposed to vernacular design does not appear to have begun in recognisable form until the 1860s. The two storey veranda form of Graham Lodge would appear to be the earliest example in Shoalhaven. Similar two storey buildings with two storey verandas were soon erected nearby including Bundanon in 1866 and Boolgatta in 1870. Although modified and adapted Graham Lodge is a late example of the Victorian Georgian style with Regency influences. The use of slates in the roof was probably the earliest in Shoalhaven and reflects the aspiration to express quality and permanency in all parts of the building. This is also evident in the quality of the remnant internal cedar joinery, the design of the principle elevations, the use of the two storey veranda form and the massing and scale of the building.

James Graham (Senior) died on 24 July 1867 aged 66 and was buried in the family cemetery. Following the death of his 16-year-old son John four months later, James Graham [Junior] took over the running of the farm at Greenhills. He married Emily Ann Hewitt on 15 August 1871 and their seven children were born at Graham Lodge. The Graham family remained prominent in Nowra affairs until well into the twentieth century, and many descendants still live in the district. James (Junior) died on 4 June 1927 and his second daughter Margaret Neridah [Madge] took over the property. In October 1928 Graham farm was sold to John Thomas [Jack] Bourne, a cousin of Madge's. Jack Bourne and his wife Maud took over the property in 1930 and moved into Graham Lodge with their five children. The property stayed in Bourne family ownership until 1960 when it was sold to a consortium of Greek business people led by Theo and Andrew Mavramattes, Helen Kastrios and George Simos, which subdivided the property. The Graham Lodge portion was sold to Ted Ashcrost who lived there for several years before selling to Mrs Mary Theresa Sherlock. Tess Sherlock turned the downstairs section of Graham Lodge into a function centre named Prague Lodge while she resided in the upstairs section of the home.

After its formation in 1968 the Nowra-Bomaderry Leagues Club began negotiating to take over Prague Lodge. The club leased and then in 1970 purchased the property, further extending the building and making radical alterations to its interior fabric. The Nowra-Bomaderry Leagues Club survived for twenty years before financial difficulties caused its closure in 1992. After a long period of disuse during which the building became derelict, the Shoalhaven City Council purchased the property in 1998 and began restoration and interpretation works.

A 2017 proposal by developers Asset Group Solutions would completely refurbish the building in a $500,000 upgrade associated with the Nowra Gateway multi-storey apartment development, after which time it would be returned to council.There are hopes that the building will once again be a Leagues Club, with the intention of supporting all Rugby League Clubs in the Shoalhaven Region

== Description ==
Graham Lodge is located near the south bank of the Shoalhaven River just to the north-east of Nowra's town centre, and adjacent to the Princes Highway by-pass. Facing east, the house overlooks some of its original pastoral landscape, including its family cemetery. A tourist information facility, the Nowra Visitors' Centre, operated for several years in a wing of the building that used to be part of Graham Lodge in its former life as a Leagues Club, and is now separated from Graham Lodge by several metres of grass. A medium density housing development is nearby to the south.

Graham Lodge is a large two-storey residence built in 1860–1861 in the Victorian Georgian style with Victorian Regency influences. Victorian Georgian styling is apparent in the symmetrical ordering and harmonic proportions of windows and doors in the main facades to the east and west, the medium pitch of the main roof and the use of larger paned glass windows and durable slate for the main roof than was typically available for the earlier Colonial Georgian styles housing. It is also apparent in the boxed eaves, the use of corrugated iron (painted in stripes) for the separate upper verandah roofs and the fan-light over the front door. Victorian Regency detailing is apparent in the smooth-textured rendered and painted exterior walls, the moulded chimney tops and decorative wrought-iron balustrade on the upper front verandah.

Construction is of locally fired bricks on sandstone footings, rendered to resemble ashlar, with a double hipped slate roof and four pairs of hexagonal chimneys on squared bases. Both front and back elevations have a two-storey verandah. The front upper verandah has a bell-cast roof and cast iron columns with drip moulds, iron lace brackets and fringe and a wrought iron balustrade. The front lower storey verandah has remnants of original detail, including cast iron verandah posts and iron lace brackets. All external doors and windows were originally fabricated in cedar with window sills and lintels of stone. Remnant joinery on the upper storey includes central double hung window with twelve panes, and glass and timber French doors with multiple panes and margin glazing opening onto the balcony; and on the ground floor, double hung sash windows. The ground floor front door joinery (but not the door), including a semi circular fanlight, is also intact. The rendered arch was inscribed with the words "Graham Lodge", and these words have been recently been restored. An incised brick bearing the name "ARDENER" (probably referring to the maiden name of the first owner's wife) was found on the north façade and has been conserved under glass as a feature within the rest of the wall which has been re-rendered. Sandstone flagging near the western façade may have been built at the same time as the residence and there may be some remnants of a well here. Archaeological relics including broken glass, crockery, nails and bricks were present adjacent to the southern and eastern facades in 1999. Some Aboriginal relics were also discovered in the archaeological survey of 2000. The remnant garden features Howea sp. (probably more than 50 years old), and Acacia sp.

The Graham family cemetery is a small private cemetery within view to the east of the residence, now on a separate allotment, that contains three headstones and the Graham monument. Its first burial was that of William Graham who died on 20 September 1852. Other known burials within the cemetery include Margaret Graham (d. 20 December 1853); John Graham (d. 24 April 1862), James Graham (d. 24 July 1867); Heroine Ivy Graham (d. 2 February 1893); Ross Stuart Graham (d. 7 February 1906); Hubert Lionel Graham (d. 14 September 1919); Emily Anne Graham (d. 13 November 1924); and James Graham (d. 4 June 1927). There is also a memorial to Douglas Erle Graham (killed in action 14 April 1918). The headstone dedicated to William Graham is of particular significance as marking the grave of an original land grantee situated on the original grant.

There is effective external interpretation on-site in the form of captioned glass panels bearing various historic images of the house and its occupants, erected at several points around the property and near the cemetery.

=== Condition ===
An archaeological survey of the precinct was carried out in 1999, which found artefacts relating to early European occupation of Greenhills were present, including Aboriginal relics both pre-contactand post-contact. A further archaeological survey was carried out early in 2000 and artefactual material was also exposed during the demolition of the Nowra Bomaderry Leagues Club buildings. Strong potential archaeological sites beyond the existing property boundary have also been identified.

Graham Lodge retains much of its external fabric, joinery and detailing intact. Unsympathetic additions have been largely dismantled. Much of the interior fabric of the building has been compromised or removed during modifications and is presently being reconstructed. Its relationship to the pastoral landscape has been somewhat compromised by the construction of a large tourist information facility very close by.

=== Modifications and dates ===
- Graham family era (1860–1928) – the back of the residence was accompanied by a variety of working sheds and cottages, now demolished (see Samual Elyard painting, 1877).
- Bourne family era (c. 1930 to 1960) – little modification
- Prague Lodge era (1960–1970) – considerable modification including extension to the north at ground floor level and demolition of some of the original interior fabric.
- Nowra-Bomaderry Leagues Club era (1970–1990) – considerable modification including further extensions at ground floor level and demolition of much of the original interior fabric.
- Shoalhaven City Council era (1990 to present) – recent conservation works to the building have included the partial demolition of additions, reconstruction of parts of the exterior fabric and conservation works to the building generally (detailed in Shoalhave City Council's report, "Graham Lodge Exterior Restoration", 2001). The original roof with slate tiles, cedar battens, guttering and eaves was removed prior to the archaeological survey of 1999.
- c. 2000 – Visitor Information Centre

== Heritage listing ==
Graham Lodge is significant for its aesthetic quality as a substantial nineteenth century Victorian Georgian residence still overlooking much of its original pastoral landholdings and for its potential to expand historical understanding of early European settlement patterns and interactions with Aboriginal people.

It also has significance for its historical associations with the foundation of local politics in the Shoalhaven and its more recent recreational role as club premises, in which function it contributed to the social life of the region for nearly 40 years. It can thus be seen to be a microcosm demonstrating some of the broad patterns of historical development of the region.

The site has significance particularly for the archaeological potential associated with the "Greenhills" estate, including remnants from the demolished cottages and sheds recorded in historic paintings, evidence of both pre- and post-contact Aboriginal artefacts, and evidence of early Chinese market gardens. The curtilage includes a small lot within view of the house containing the family cemetery. The headstone dedicated to William Graham is of particular significance as marking the grave of an original land grantee situated on the original grant.

Graham Lodge was listed on the New South Wales State Heritage Register on 4 June 2004 having satisfied the following criteria.

The place is important in demonstrating the course, or pattern, of cultural or natural history in New South Wales.

Graham Lodge is of State historical significance as a substantial nineteenth century Victorian Georgian residence that was the focus of the "Greenhills" estate, an early European settlement in the region. Still overlooking some of the original pastoral acreage of Graham's father's pioneering property of Greenhills, the Victorian Georgian styled house has important archaeological potential for its record of nineteenth century pastoralism, its history of contact between European and Aboriginal people, and its evidence of nineteenth century Chinese market gardens. It also has historical associations with the foundation of local politics in the Shoalhaven in 1860 and for its more recent recreational function as club premises. It thus can be seen to be a microcosm reflecting some of the broad patterns of historical development of the region. Many aspects of these historical roles are furthermore evidenced in artworks and images depicting the property and its inhabitants at various times.

The place has a strong or special association with a person, or group of persons, of importance of cultural or natural history of New South Wales's history.

Graham Lodge has local significance for its historical association with the Graham family, who were among the first European settlers in the area and prominent in early local politics. It is also significant for its evidence of the craftsmanship of early Nowra builders Charles Moore and Willet Burrey. The private cemetery records the deaths of many early Graham family members.

The place is important in demonstrating aesthetic characteristics and/or a high degree of creative or technical achievement in New South Wales.

Graham Lodge is of State significance as an early substantial residence built 1860–1861 on the NSW south coast, in the style of Victorian Georgian with Victorian Regency influences. The two storey veranda facade would appear to be the earliest example of this residential form in the Shoalhaven. The imposing facade and use of building materials such as roof slates and internal cedar joinery are an expression of the aspiration to quality and permanency in all parts of the building, illustrating both its owner's social standing and the gradual urbanisation of the area.

The place has strong or special association with a particular community or cultural group in New South Wales for social, cultural or spiritual reasons.

As the focal point of the "Greenhills" pastoral estate from 1860, Graham Lodge has State social and cultural significance because of its associations with the early European settlement of regional NSW and as an early point of contact between European and Aboriginal people, as well as a site used by Chinese market gardeners. The location of the private family cemetery within view of the home is suggestive of a more domestic relationship of family life with the deaths of family members than is typically practiced now. As the home of the municipality's first mayor and home to subsequent family members prominent in Nowra affairs, it also has local significance for local social and political history. In addition, the building functioned prominently in the social life of the region as a function centre and club building between 1960 and 1998.

The place has potential to yield information that will contribute to an understanding of the cultural or natural history of New South Wales.

Graham Lodge is of State significance for its archaeological potential to demonstrate aspects of the history of a pastoral estate with clear connections with Aboriginal people. Its archaeological potential is enhanced by the visual evidence of cottages and sheds recorded in various historical artworks including Samuel Elyard's painting of 1877, and by the proximity of the Graham family cemetery. Graham Lodge is also of local significance as an early residence which contributes to the understanding of mid-nineteenth century regional construction techniques and for illustrating the story of European settlement and local government in the Shoalhaven district.

The place possesses uncommon, rare or endangered aspects of the cultural or natural history of New South Wales.

Graham Lodge is of local significance for its rarity as a surviving remnant of a nineteenth century pastoral estate that includes a substantial mid-nineteenth residential building, a family cemetery, and archaeological sites within a partially intact cultural landscape. The location of the private family cemetery within view of the home is suggestive of a more domestic relationship of family life with the deaths of family members than is typically practiced now. The headstone dedicated to William Graham is of particular significance as marking the grave of an original land grantee on part of the original grant.

The place is important in demonstrating the principal characteristics of a class of cultural or natural places/environments in New South Wales.

Graham Lodge is of State significance for being representative of the early European settlement and political development enacted by pioneering families in rural NSW. It is a fine example of a substantial Victorian Georgian residence using good quality materials and projecting an imposing facade. The physical relationship of the residence to the family cemetery is representative of a different, nineteenth century understanding of the relationship of family life with death. The property is held in high esteem locally as an important remnant of the early European history of the region.
