= Jeff Dowdell =

Australian basketball player

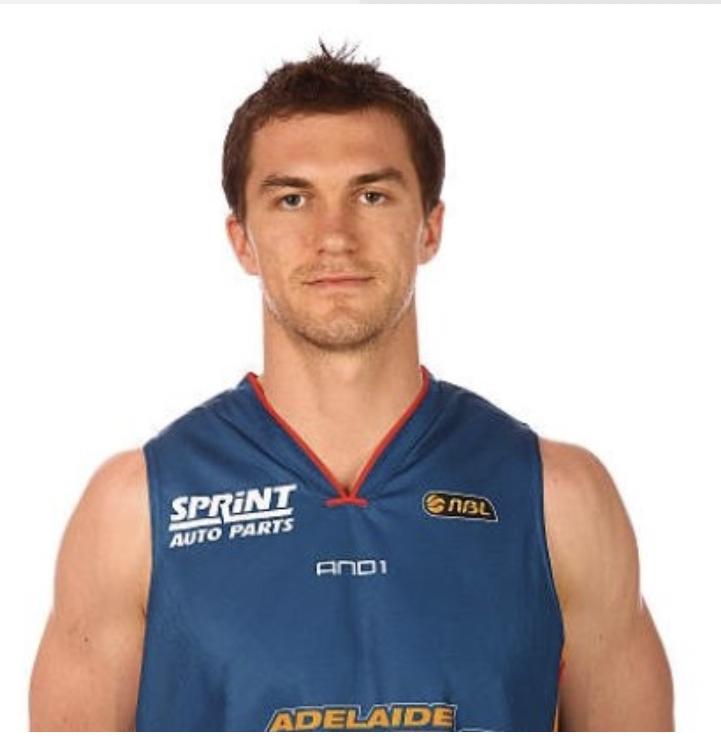

Personal information
- Born: 13 March 1987 (age 39) Cooma, New South Wales
- Listed height: 205 cm (6 ft 9 in)
- Listed weight: 101 kg (222 lb)

Career information
- Playing career: 2005–2013
- Position: Power forward

Career history
- 2005–2009: Perth Wildcats (NBL)
- 2009–2010: Townsville Crocodiles (NBL)
- 2010–2011: Adelaide 36ers (NBL)
- 2011–2012: Cairns Taipans (NBL)
- 2006: Albury-Wodonga Bandits (SEABL/NBL1 East)
- 2007-2009: Joondalup Wolves (WA State Basketball League/NBL1 West)
- 2010: North-West Tasmania Thunder (SEABL/NBL1 South)
- 2011: West Adelaide Bearcats (SA State Basketball League/NBL1 Central)
- 2013: Canberra Gunners (SEABL/NBL1 East)

Career highlights
- AIS Scholarship holder (2003 - 2005); Perth Wildcats - Most Improved Player (2005-06, 2006-07); Perth Wildcats - Coaches Award (2007-08, 2008-09); SEABL/NBL1 East - All SEABL East Team (2006); SBL/NBL1 West - All-Star Second Team (2007); SBL/NBL1 West - All-Star First Team (2008); Wanneroo Wolves - Most Valuable Player (2008, 2009); SEABL/NBL1 South - Australian Youth Player of the Year (2010); West Adelaide Bearcats - Most Valuable Player (2011); Canberra Gunners - Most Valuable Player (2013)

Jeffrey Dowdell (born 13 March 1987) is a former Australian professional basketball player. He played a total of 196 NBL games with four teams from 2005 to 2012. He also had a successful SEABL/NBL1 career playing for a number of clubs from 2004 to 2013.

== Early life ==
Born in Cooma, New South Wales, he was a product of the Shoalhaven Tigers basketball program which has produced several NBL, WNBL, and NCAA players.

During his junior career, Dowdell represented Shoalhaven and NSW Country before being awarded a scholarship to the Australian Institute of Sport (2004 to 2005). During this time, he competed for Australia at the Albert Schweitzer tournament in Germany in 2004 and was a member of the Australian under 22 squad in 2005.

== Professional career ==
In 2005, Dowdell played his rookie NBL season with the Perth Wildcats and, at the age of 18, was the youngest player in the competition. In the same year, he was named as NSW Junior Player of the Year by Basketball New South Wales. The Wildcats would go on to finish the season in seventh place with Dowdell receiving the club's Most Improved Player award.

After his first NBL season, Dowdell played for the Albury Wodonga Bandits in the 2006 SEABL season. He was second in points per game (ppg) in the East conference (24.9 ppg) and ninth in rebounding (8.59 rpg). He was named in the 2006 All SEABL East team.

In his second NBL season (2006–07 NBL season) with the Wildcats, he established himself as a regular part of the Wildcats rotation averaging 4.3 points, 2.1 rebounds and 0.9 assists per game. The Wildcats finished in third place and he was awarded the club's Most Improved Player for the second time.

After the 2006–07 NBL season, Dowdell played for the Wanneroo Wolves in the State Basketball League, where he averaged 27.5 ppg. He played for the Wolves for the 2007, 2008 and 2009 SBL seasons, being awarded the club's Most Valuable Player twice (2008 and 2009) and named in the SBL/NBL1 West All Star Second Team in 2007 and All Star First Team in 2008.

In the 2007-08 NBL season, Dowdell's playing time and output would improve again and he went on to average 6.4 points per game and 3.9 rebounds. The Wildcats would go on to finish fourth and were knocked out of the semi-finals by the Sydney Kings. At the end of the season, Dowdell was awarded the Coaches Award by the Wildcats coach, Scott Fisher.

Dowdell would again receive the club's Coaches Award for the 2008-09 NBL season despite his playing time reducing under new coach, Conner Henry. The Wildcats finished fourth again but were eliminated in the first round of playoffs by the Townsville Crocodiles.

Dowdell left the Wildcats to play for the Townsville Crocodiles in the 2009–10 NBL season where he played 30 games, averaging 3.1 points, 1.8 rebounds and 0.3 assists per game. Townsville finished the season third but were knocked out of the semi-finals by the Wollongong Hawks. Following the 2009-10 NBL season, he played in the SEABL for the North-West Tasmania Thunder. During his time at the Thunder, the team had a record of 13 wins and 9 losses and Dowdell was named as the SEABL Australian Youth Player of the Year.

Following a single season with the Crocodiles, Dowdell signed to play for the Adelaide 36ers for the 2010–11 NBL season and played all 28 games for the 36ers, averaging 4.8 points, 2.6 rebounds and 0.7 assists per game. Adelaide finished the season in eighth with a record of 9 wins and 19 losses. After the NBL season, Dowdell played for the West Adelaide Bearcats where his team finished fourth and lost in the semi-finals. He averaged 21.7 points, 10.6 rebounds and 2.9 assists and was named the Bearcat's Most Valuable Player.

Dowdell once again changed clubs for the 2011-12 NBL season, this time moving north to the Cairns Taipans. The Taipans finished fifth and only missed out on the playoffs by percentage differential. Dowdell averaged 4.0 points, 2.3 rebounds and 0.8 assists per game.

In 2013, Dowdell joined the Canberra Gunners in the SEABL after a period away from basketball due to a degenerative hip injury. He was awarded the Most Valuable Player award for the season.

In 2015, Dowdell played for the Queanbeyan Yowies in Division 1 of the Waratah League where he was named in the league's All Star Five team.

In his 196-game NBL career, he averaged 4.2 points and 2.3 rebounds per game.

== Personal life ==
Dowdell now lives in Canberra and works in finance for the Australian Public Service. Following basketball, Dowdell played a number of seasons of Australian rules football with the Belconnen Magpies in the AFL Canberra competition and was fourth in the Mulrooney Medal in 2019.

At the end of 2011, the Adelaide Crows Football Club announced the signing of Dowdell's younger brother, Ben, to the rookie list. He had no AFL background and was signed purely for height, athleticism and potential.
