= Mundamia =

Rural locality in City of Shoalhaven

- Suburb
- Coordinates: 34.8881°S 150.5704°E
- Country: Australia
- State: New South Wales
- Region: South Coast
- LGA: City of Shoalhaven

Government
  - State electorate: Kiama
  - Federal division: Gilmore
- Elevation: 43 m (141 ft)

Population
  - Total: 81 (2016 census)
- Postcode: 2540
- County: St Vincent
- Parish: Bunberra

Mundamia, a rural locality in the City of Shoalhaven, New South Wales. is a Nowra suburb located slightly southwest of the Nowra CBD Mundamia contains the West Nowra Waste Depot as well as the University of Wollongong Shoalhaven campus.

The population of the locality was 81 at the 2021 census.

== Geography ==
Mundamia features a predominantly rural and forested environment, with the main transport route traversing the area being Yalwal Road. The locality is going through infrastructure changes to support the Mundamia Urban Release Area, including major local government road-widening an intersection upgrades at George Evans Road.
