= Shoalhaven Tigers =

- Conference: Barrengarry Conference
- Leagues: New South Wales Waratah League; Southern Junior Leagues
- Founded: 1968
- History: Shoalhaven Tigers; 1968-present
- Arena: The Jungle; Shoalhaven Indoor Sports Stadium
- Location: Bomaderry, New South Wales
- Team colors: Black and Orange
- Main sponsor: Ford
- Championships: Men: Div. 1 - 1988, 1989, 1990; Women: Div. 2 1988; Div. 1: 2002, 2003, 2007
- Website: shoalhavenbasketball.com.au

The Shoalhaven Tigers are a local basketball association on the New South Wales south coast. Players participate in thriving domestic competitions from U10 to seniors across the week, and Tigers Academy skill development sessions.

Younger players learn skills while having fun in the Tiger Cubs and Aussie Hoops programs. Our coaches lead sessions for local schools through Sporting Schools grants. Programs and clinics for programs including 'I am a Girl', Walking Basketball, and Assist All Hoops make basketball available to everyone!

Representative teams from U12 to Seniors compete in the NSW Waratah Senior League, Southern Junior League, John Martin Country Tournament, and Barrengarry Conference.

The Association regularly has players selected for BNSW high-performance programs including: U12 Jamboree, TAP, D-League, and the Heroes Challenge events.

Over the years, the Tigers have produced players who have gone on to the NCAA, Euro League, NBL1, NBL and WNBL. Some of these players have also represented Australia at various junior levels and higher.

== History ==
Our story began in 1968 as the Shoalhaven Amateur Basketball Association (SABA). In 1989, SABA was incorporated under the Associations Incorporation Act to become Shoalhaven Basketball Association (SBA).

The Tigers Den, as it became known, had one court until 1972 when SBA expanded the facility by adding the Championship Court (Court 1), plus an office, canteen, and sauna. The existing court was renamed Court 2. Soon after, the Championship Court was named the Alan Oke Court, in honour of one of SBA’s founding members.

SBA conducted a range of basketball and non-basketball activities from the Tigers Den, from concerts and cabarets to National Championships and the iconic Easter carnival.

In October 2019, SBA relocated to the new four-court multipurpose Shoalhaven Indoor Sports Centre (SISC) which has come to be known as The Jungle. As a major tenant, SBA has a dedicated office space and maintains a strong working relationship with SISC. The show court in SISC is named after John Martin in recognition of his contribution to basketball at the local, state, and International level.
