= Tranquil Star =

Australian-bred Thoroughbred racehorse

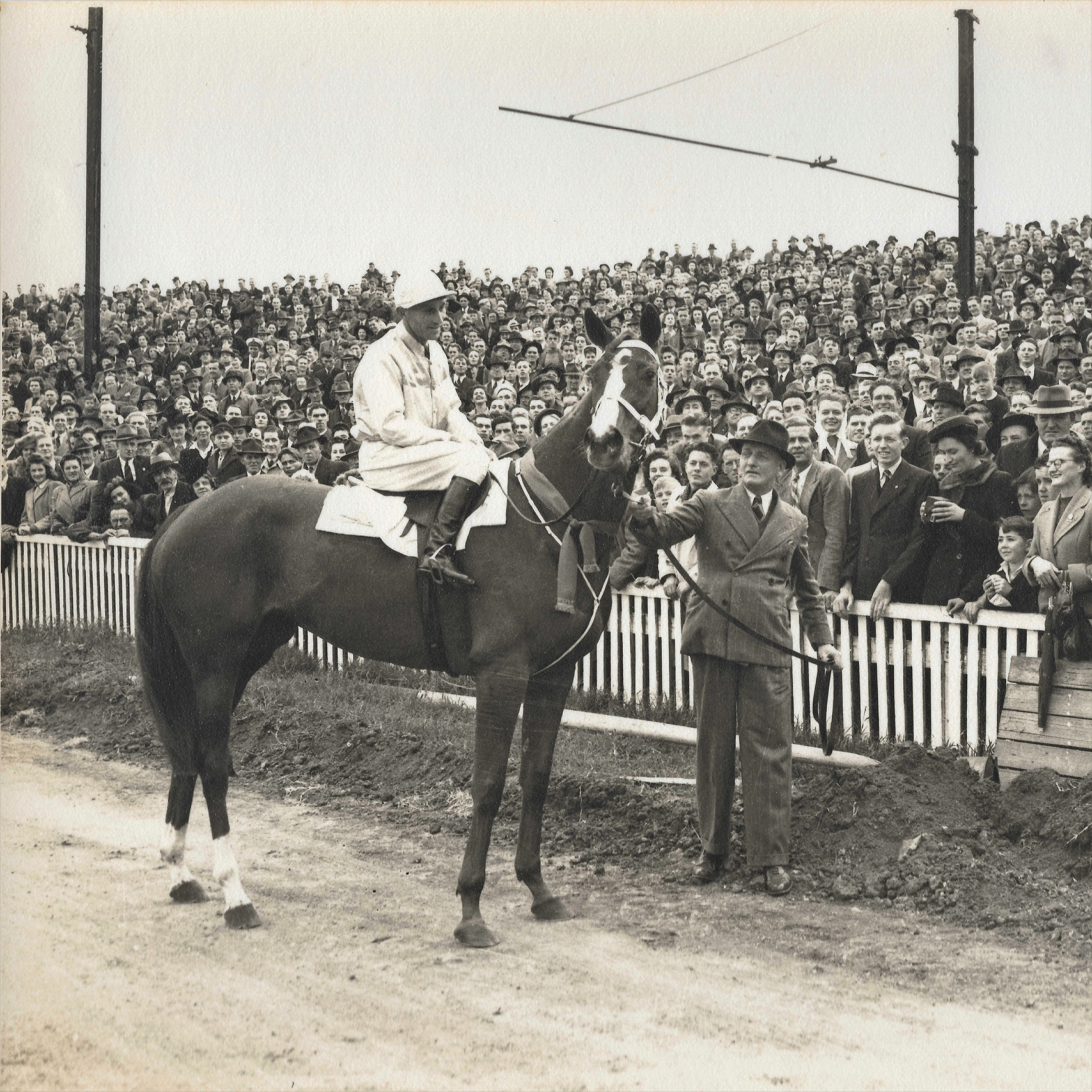
- Tranquil Star & Scobie Breasley
- Sire: Gay Lothario (GB)
- Grandsire: Gay Crusader
- Dam: Lone Star
- Damsire: Great Star (GB)
- Sex: Mare
- Foaled: 1937
- Country: Australia
- Colour: Chestnut
- Breeder: St Albans Stud
- Owner: T. G. Jones and Arthur Cobden
- Trainer: Ron Cameron
- Record: 111 starts: 23-20-12
- Earnings: £26,690

Major wins
- Edward Manifold Stakes (1940); St George Stakes (1941, 1944, 1945); VRC St Leger (1941); Chipping Norton Stakes (1941); LKS Mackinnon Stakes (1942, 1944, 1945); Alister Clark Stakes (1942); Caulfield Stakes (1942); Caulfield Cup (1942); W S Cox Plate (1942, 1944); Memsie Stakes (1945); William Reid Stakes (1946)

Honours
- Australian Racing Hall of Fame; VATC Tranquil Star Stakes
- Last updated on 12 June 2010

Tranquil Star (foaled in 1937) was one of the hardiest and best performed Australian-bred Thoroughbred race-mares. She is the only mare to have won the double of the Caulfield Stakes, now known as the Might and Power Stakes, and the Cox Plate, which is the most prestigious weight-for-age (wfa) race in Australia. Tranquil Star had 111 starts and won over distances ranging from 5 furlongs (1,000 metres) to 14 furlongs (2,800 metres). She was later inducted into the Australian Racing Hall of Fame.

== Breeding ==
She was bred by Messrs H. G. Raymond and H. B. Ranken at St Albans Stud near Geelong, Victoria and was by the good, imported sire, Gay Lothario (sire of winners of £266,000), her dam was the non-winner, Lone Star, who was by a good sire in Great Star (GB). Tranquil Star was a sister to the non-stakes-winners, Sun Beau (four wins), Paringa (two wins), Flighty (unplaced) and The Ritz (six wins), who were indifferent racehorses. She was also a half-sister to Only Star, by Enfield, who was unable to win a race in 13 starts. Tranquil Star descended from Daffodils Dam through Lady Vivian (GB), who were from the Bruce Lowe family 20.

Tranquil Star was sold at Mackinnon and Cox's 1939 yearling sales and was purchased by the partners Messrs R. Cobden and T. G. Jones for 600 guineas.

=== 1944 racebook ===
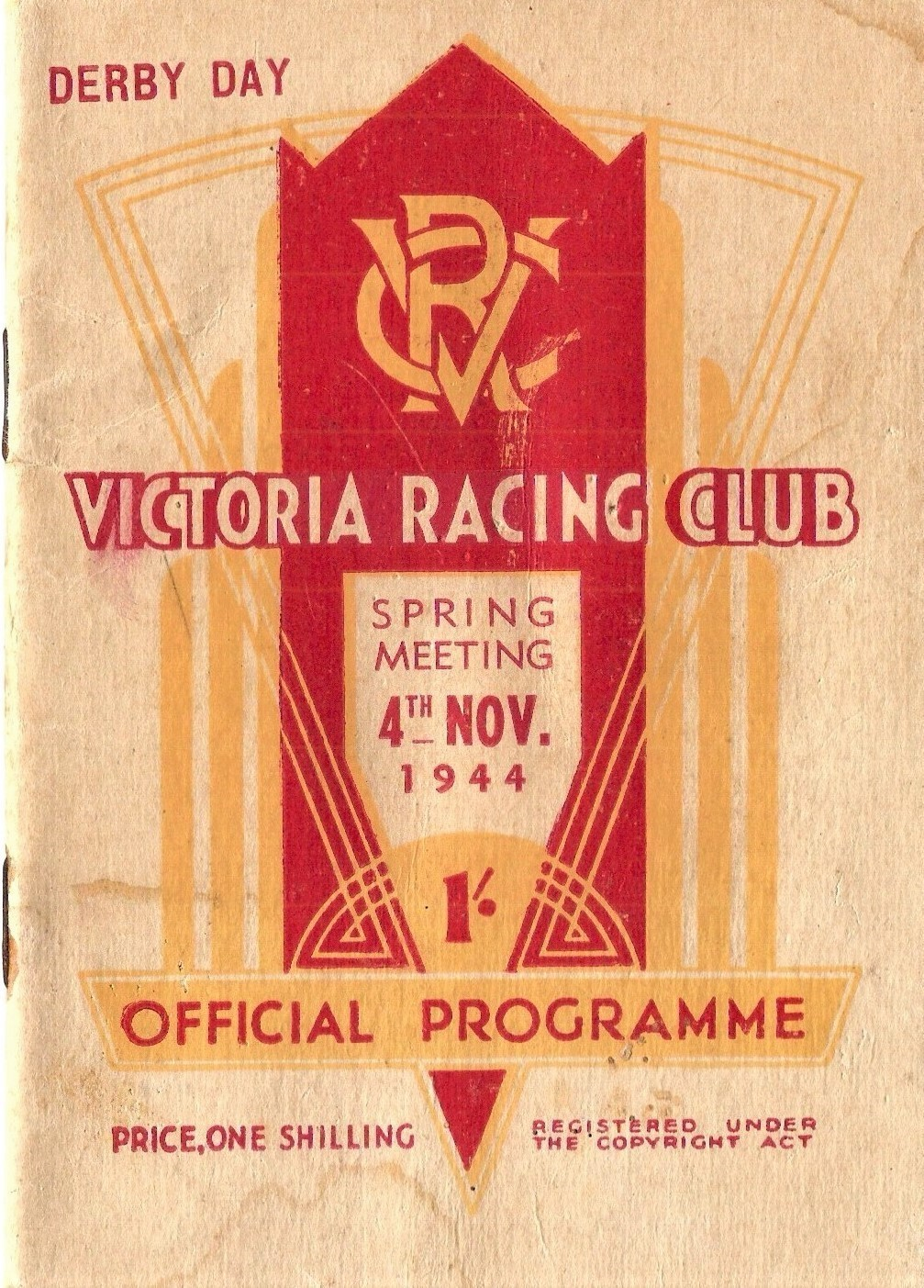
1944 L.K.S. Mackinnon Stakes racebook front cover

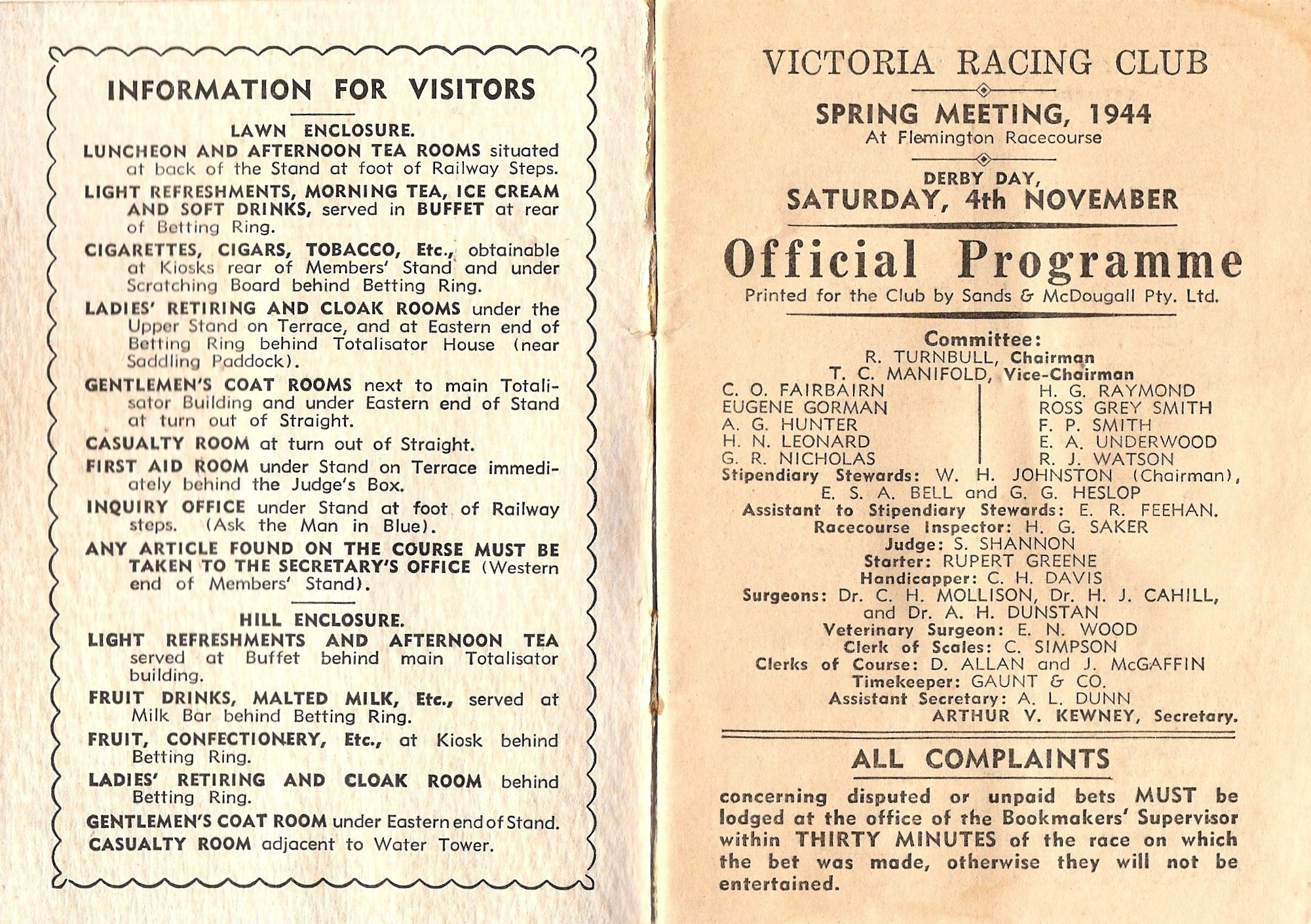
1944 L.K.S. Mackinnon Stakes page showing raceday officials

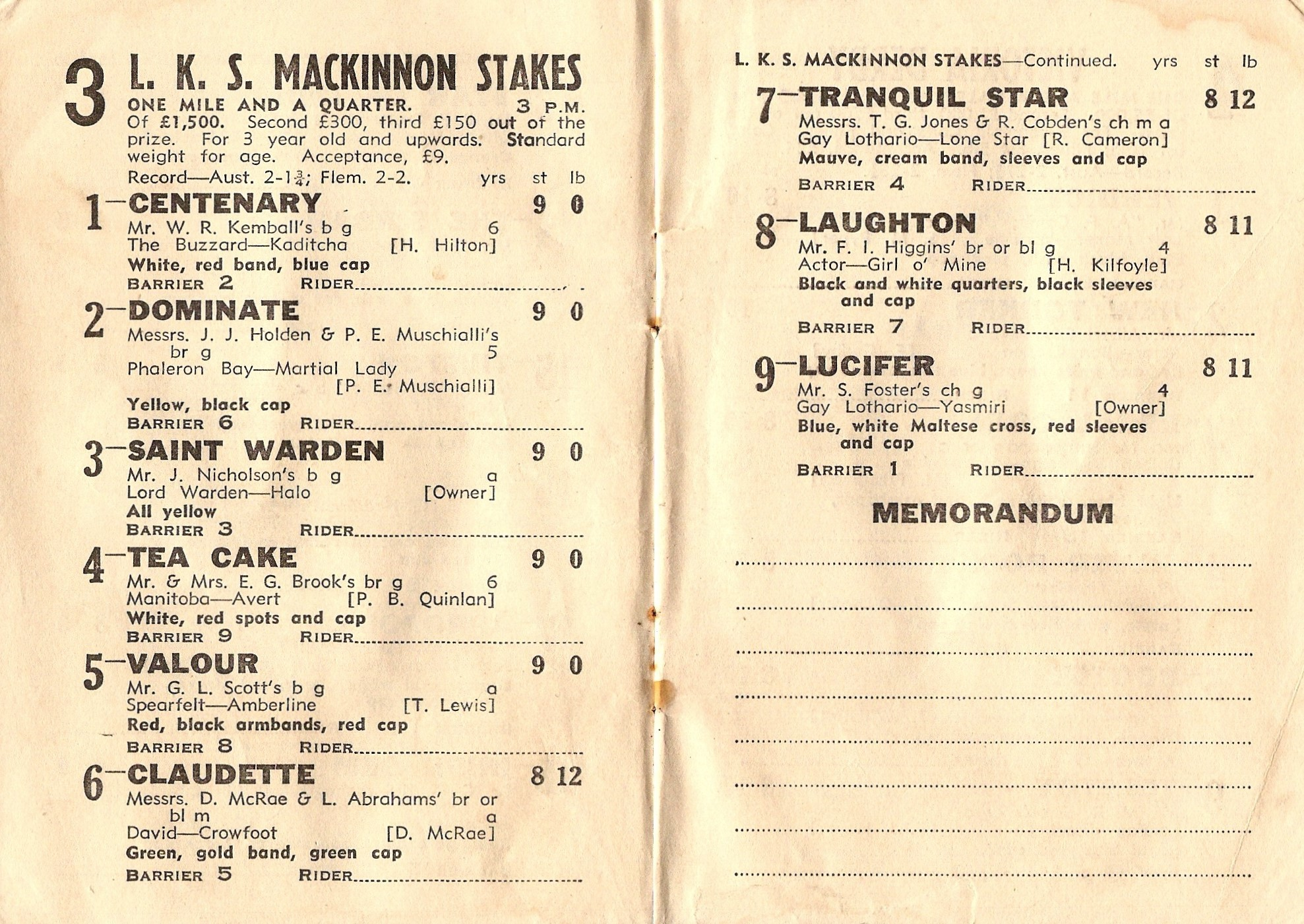
1944 L.K.S.Mackinnon Stakes page showing the winner, Tranquil Star

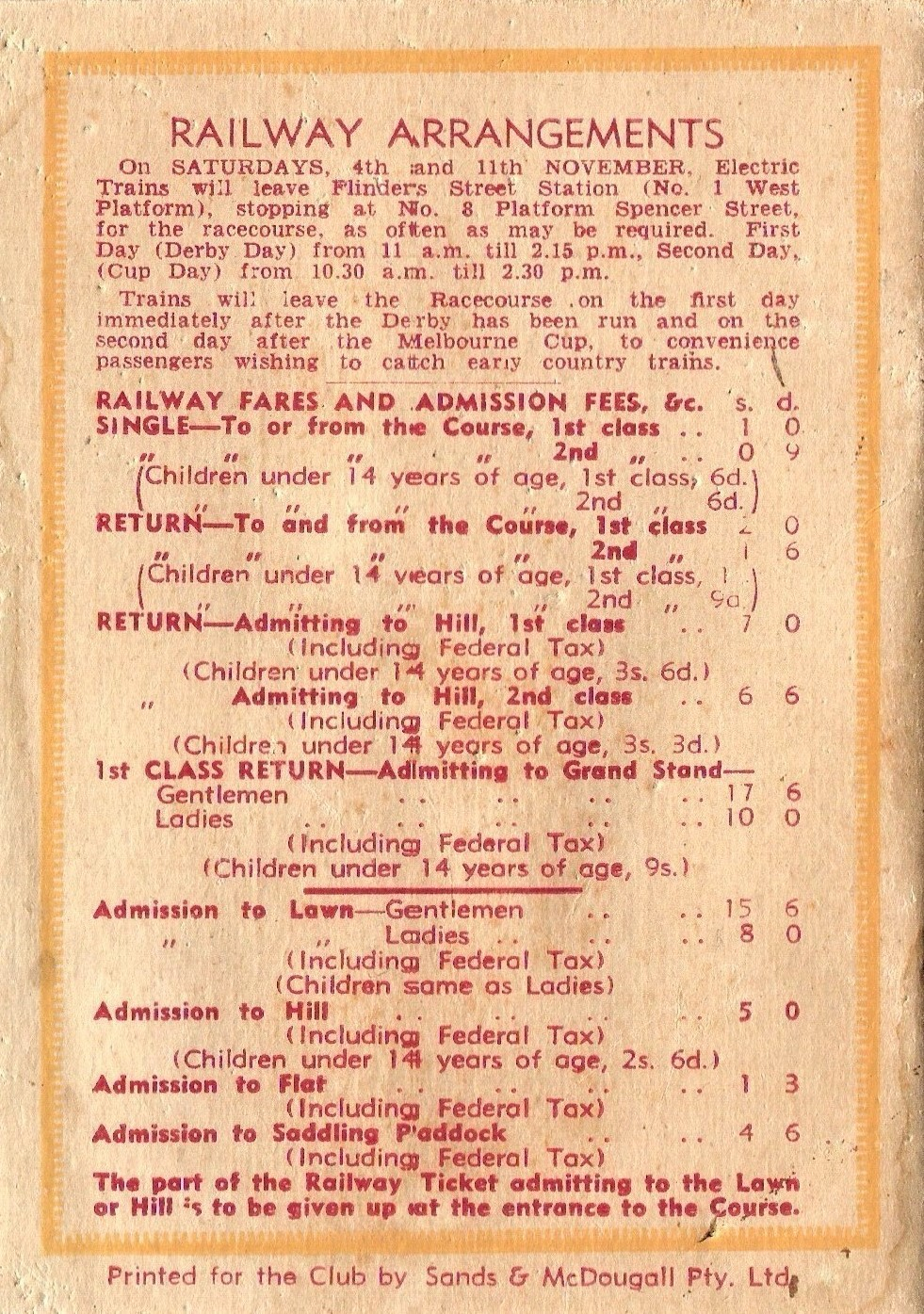
Back cover showing entrance & railway charges

== Racing record ==
She was owned by T. G. Jones in partnership with Arthur Cobden and trained by Ron Cameron during her racing career.

=== At two years: 1939–1940 ===
As a two-year-old Tranquil Star had 13 race starts for two wins, in the V.R.C. Ottawa Stakes and Williamstown Juvenile Handicap, plus four seconds for that season.

=== At three years: 1940–1941 ===
In her three-year-old racing season Tranquil Star had 15 race starts for wins in the V.R.C. Edward Manifold Stakes, the V.A.T.C. St George Stakes, VRC St Leger Stakes and in her only trip to Sydney, she took out the now graded Group one (G1), A.J.C. Chipping Norton Stakes plus the Cumberland Plate. She was the only filly in the field when she finished second to Lucrative in the Victoria Derby and was second again when defeated by a neck in the VRC Oaks during the season.

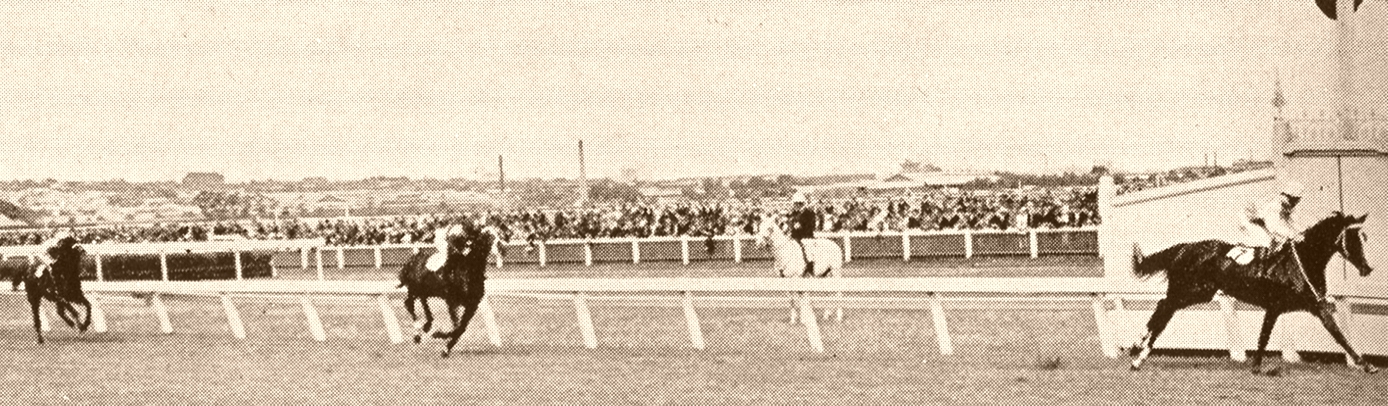
Tranquil Star wins the VRC St Leger stakes by 5 lengths.

=== At four years: 1941–1942 ===
At her first four-year-old start Tranquil Star ran second in the (G1), Underwood Stakes, and then followed this with a second to Lucrative in the Caulfield Stakes before again running second in the Moonee Valley W. S. Cox Plate to champion Beau Vite plus another second in the C F Orr Stakes. She won VRC C.M. Lloyd Stakes and Moonee Valley Alister Clark Stakes and was third in the Williamstown Cup. She finished the season with 21 starts for 2 wins, 4 seconds and 4 thirds.

=== At five years: 1942–1943 ===
Tranquil Star won the Moonee Valley Quality Handicap, then defeated True Flight in the Caulfield Stakes, before winning the Caulfield Cup (carrying 8 stone 12 lbs and from a big field which included three horses who had won a Melbourne Cup, Colonus, Skipton, and Dark Felt), the W.S. Cox Plate with K. Smith in the saddle and the V.R.C. LKS Mackinnon Stakes in four successive runs before winning the C.M. Lloyd Stakes. In winning the Cox Plate she became the only mare to win the Caulfield (Yalumba) Stakes and the Cox Plate double. During the season she had 14 starts for 6 wins in major races, but was unplaced in her other starts for this season.

=== At six years: 1943–1944 ===
As a six-year-old in 1943 Tranquil Star was beaten narrowly by Amana in the Caulfield Stakes, V.R.C. Melbourne Stakes and L. K. S. Mackinnon Stakes but Tranquil Star gained revenge on Amana in the St George Stakes by relegating him into second place. Tranquil Star also placed second in V.A.T.C. Memsie Stakes and VRC C. M. Lloyd Stakes as well as placing third in the C F Orr Stakes and Underwood Stakes. During her final start of the 1944 season Tranquil Star fractured her jaw so badly that it had to be wired. It was only the patient attention of her trainer and her iron constitution enabled her to survive this disaster. Her tally for this season was 14 starts for 1 win, 5 seconds and 2 thirds.

=== At seven years: 1944–1945 ===
In winning her second W.S. Cox Plate Tranquil Star became the first seven-year-old mare, and the only one of two to win this prestigious race at that age. Winx (2018) was the only other one to accomplish this achievement. She also won her second L.K.S. Mackinnon Stakes plus the C.M. Lloyd Stakes and the V.A.T.C. St George Stakes. Tranquil Star finished second in the Williamstown Underwood Stakes, J. J. Liston Stakes and Moonee Valley Glenara Handicap (with 9 stone 7 pounds). She placed third in the Melbourne Stakes and Caulfield Stakes (defeated by Counsel and Lawrence) and in V.R.C. Essendon Stakes. Her defeat in the Essendon Stakes was attributed by her trainer, Ron Cameron to the heat, as she had been beaten before under similar conditions.

=== At eight years: 1945–1946 ===
In her final season as an eight-year-old Tranquil Star won her third LKS Mackinnon Stakes (defeating Flight in a good field), the six furlong weight-for-age William Reid Stakes and the Memsie Stakes. She placed second in VRC C.B. Fisher Plate and VATC Eclipse Stakes plus thirds in the Caulfield Stakes in which she conceded weight to Bernborough, then at his peak, and the Linlithgow Stakes (to Royal Gem).

During her racing career, Tranquil Star had 111 starts for 23 wins, including 9 wins at what would now be regarded as group one level. She also scored 20 seconds and 12 thirds for a total of £26,690 in prize-money which made her Australasia's greatest stake-winning mare.

Tranquil Star's last public appearance was before a large crowd on 24 March 1946 at Olympic Park, Victoria. A. Breasley was her rider and her trainer Ron Cameron also attended.

== Stud record ==
Retired to stud Tranquil Star was a good brood mare that produced nine foals, of which seven were raced and three were winners.

Her progeny were:

- 1947 Chestnut filly, Tranquil Dawn by Dhoti (GB), unplaced in five starts, became 5th dam of Calaway Gal (won the 2002 Golden Slipper Stakes)
- 1948 Chestnut filly, Tranquil Dusk by Dhoti, two unplaced starts, dam of Ivanhoe (won Doomben Stakes, Queensland Guineas, QTC Sires Produce Stakes)
- 1949 Chestnut filly, Light O’Star by Dhoti, two unplaced starts
- 1950 missed to service
- 1951 Chestnut colt, Tranquil Sun by Helios (GB) won seven races in Melbourne
- 1952 Chestnut filly, Tranquil Court by Comic Court, eight unplaced starts
- 1953 Chestnut colt, Tranquil Glow by Helios, won 11 races, including 9 steeplechases
- 1954 Bay filly unnamed by Helios (GB), died 1955
- 1955 Chestnut filly, Tranquil Sea by Masthead (GB), un-raced
- 1956 Bay colt, Night Ride by Landau, won five races, including three steeplechases.

Calaway Gal was foaled by Calais Royale, a non-stud book mare whose 4th dam was Tranquil Star, but she proved she was a Thoroughbred by winning a Golden Slipper. Both of them were then promoted to Thoroughbred status and now appear in the Australian Stud Book.

== Honours ==
The owners of Tranquil Star, T. G. Jones and Arthur Cobden, donated £500 to endow a cot at the Children's Hospital in the name of Tranquil Star. In 2008 Tranquil Star was inducted into the Australian Racing Hall of Fame. The registered Group 3 Melbourne Racing Club Tranquil Star Stakes, run over 1,400 metres, are named in her honour.

== See also ==
- Thoroughbred racing in Australia
