= Alexandra Stakes (MVRC) =

- Class: Group 3
- Location: Caulfield or Moonee Valley Racecourse, Melbourne, Australia
- Inaugurated: 1983
- Race type: Thoroughbred
- Sponsor: Dynamic Print Group (2019-25)

Race information
- Distance: 1,600 metres
- Surface: Turf
- Track: Left-handed
- Qualification: Three year old fillies
- Weight: Set Weights with penalties
- Purse: $200,000 (2025)

The Alexandra Stakes is a Moonee Valley Racing Club Group 3 Australian Thoroughbred horse race for three year old fillies, at set weights with penalties, over a distance of 1600 metres, held at Moonee Valley Racecourse in Melbourne, Australia late March. With Moonee Valley under redevelopment it was moved to Caulfield in 2026.

== History ==
The race was originally held in October on W. S. Cox Plate day, but was moved to the autumn in 2013 and is now on the William Reid Stakes race day in March.

=== Name ===
- 1987–1993 - Crown Lager Stakes
- 1994–1999 - Great Western Stakes
- 2000 - Salinger Trophy
- 2001 - Rosemount Estate Trophy
- 2002–2004 - Eliza Park Stakes
- 2005–2006 - Moormoot Stud Stakes
- 2007–2010 - Arrow Training Services Stakes
- 2011 - Jeep Stakes
- 2013 onwards - Alexandra Stakes

=== Grade ===
- 1983–2015 - Listed Race
- 2016 onwards - Group 3

== Winners ==
The following are oast winners of the race.

- 2026 - Getta Good Feeling
- 2025 - Cilacap
- 2024 - Vibrant Sun
- 2023 - Papillon Club
- 2022 - Daisies
- 2021 - Chica Fuerte
- 2020 - Paradee
- 2019 - Princess Jenni
- 2018 - Think Bleue
- 2017 - Oregon's Day
- 2016 - Thames Court
- 2015 - Fontein Ruby
- 2014 - Marianne
- 2013 - You're So Good
- 2012 - †race not held
- 2011 - Torah
- 2010 - Zubbaya
- 2009 - Sublimity
- 2008 - Bauble
- 2007 - Miss Marielle
- 2006 - Manna Miss
- 2005 - Brockman's Lass
- 2004 - Creative Plan
- 2003 - Ike's Dream
- 2002 - Dextrous
- 2001 - Omens
- 2000 - Donna Dior
- 1999 - Miss Pennymoney
- 1998 - Rose O' War
- 1997 - Melinte
- 1996 - ‡Simply Believe / Suria
- 1995 - Vigil
- 1994 - Ladybird Blue
- 1993 - Super Snooper
- 1992 - Flitter
- 1991 - Dancefloor Doll
- 1990 - Mammy
- 1989 - Aretha
- 1988 - Memphis Blues
- 1987 - Sandy's Pleasure
- 1986 - Glowing Idol
- 1985 - Torvill
- 1984 - Delightful Belle
- 1983 - Sentimental Lady

† Change in race calendar when the MVRC moved the race to autumn
‡ Dead heat

== See also ==
- Alister Clark Stakes
- Sunline Stakes
- Typhoon Tracy Stakes
- William Reid Stakes
- List of Australian Group races
- Group races
