= Alister Clark Stakes =

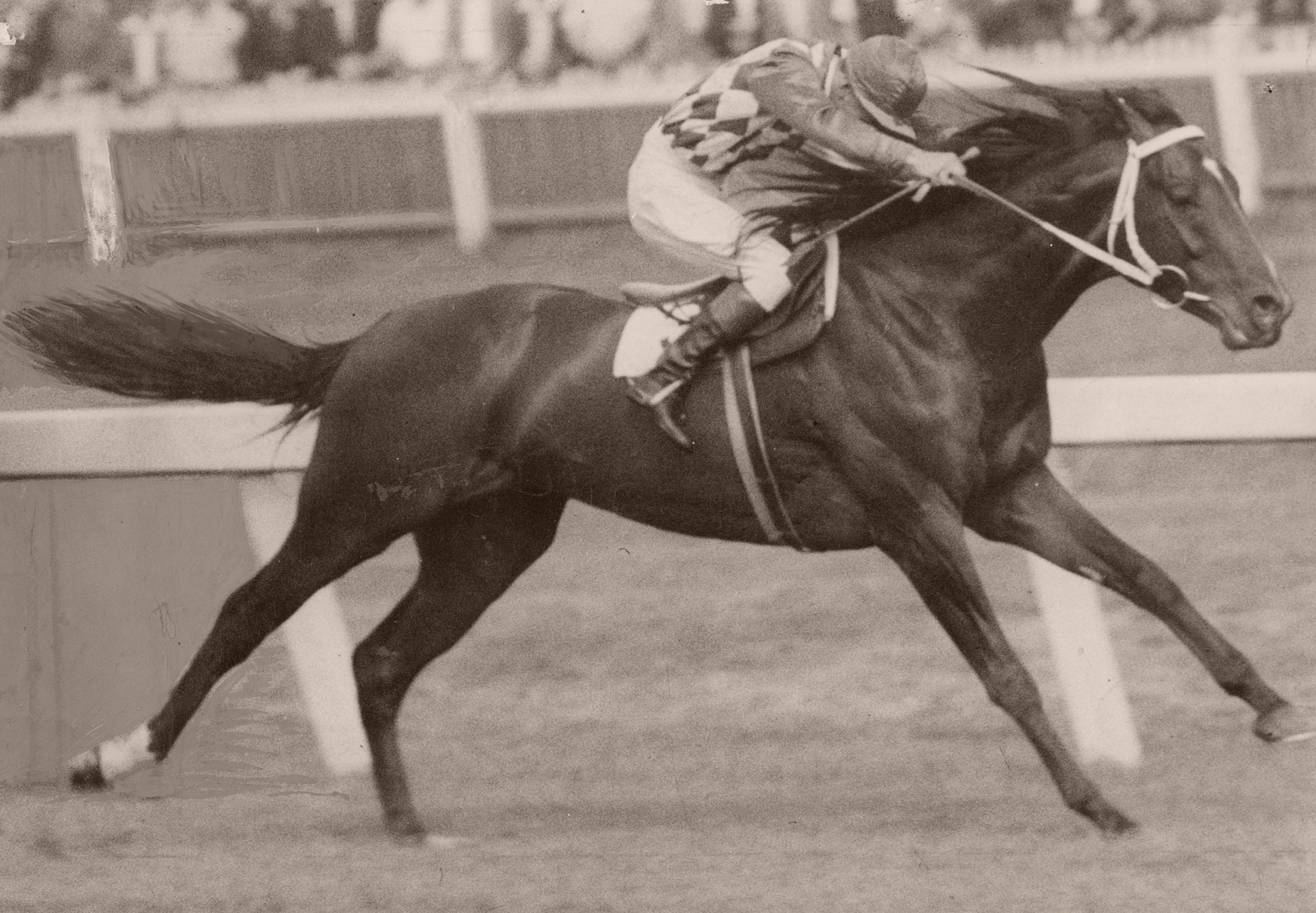
- Comic Court ,1950 winner
- Class: Group 2
- Location: Caulfield or Moonee Valley Racecourse, Melbourne
- Inaugurated: 1939
- Race type: Thoroughbred
- Sponsor: Dalton Consulting Engineers (2021–25)

Race information
- Distance: 2,040 metres
- Surface: Turf
- Track: Left-handed
- Qualification: Three-year-olds
- Weight: Set weights colts and geldings – 57 kg fillies 55 kg
- Purse: $500,000 (2025)

The Alister Clark Stakes is a Moonee Valley Racing Club Group 2 Thoroughbred horse race, for three-year-olds, at Set Weights, held annually usually at Moonee Valley Racecourse, Melbourne in March.

With Moonee Valley under redevelopment it was moved to Caulfield in 2026.

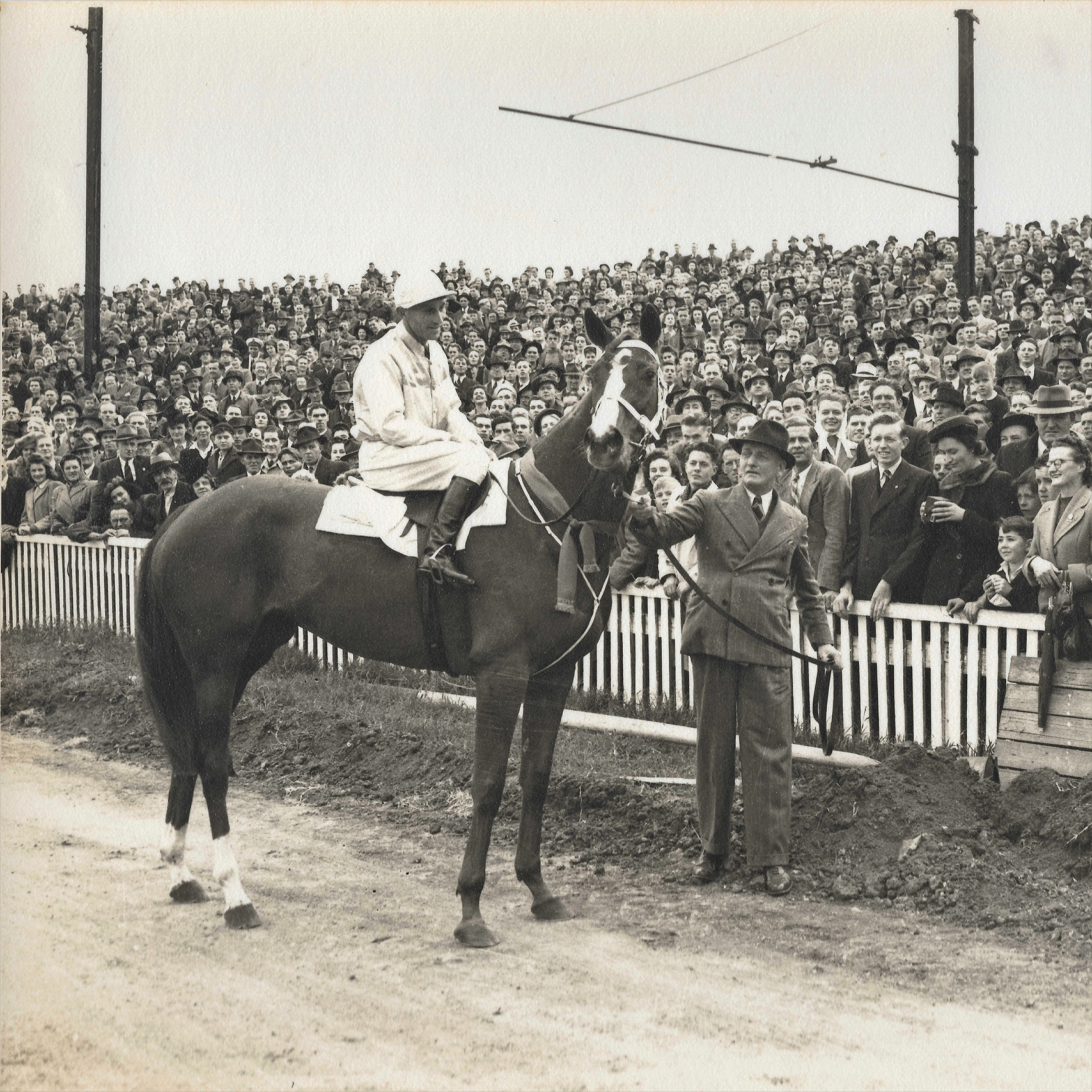
Tranquil Star, 1942 winner

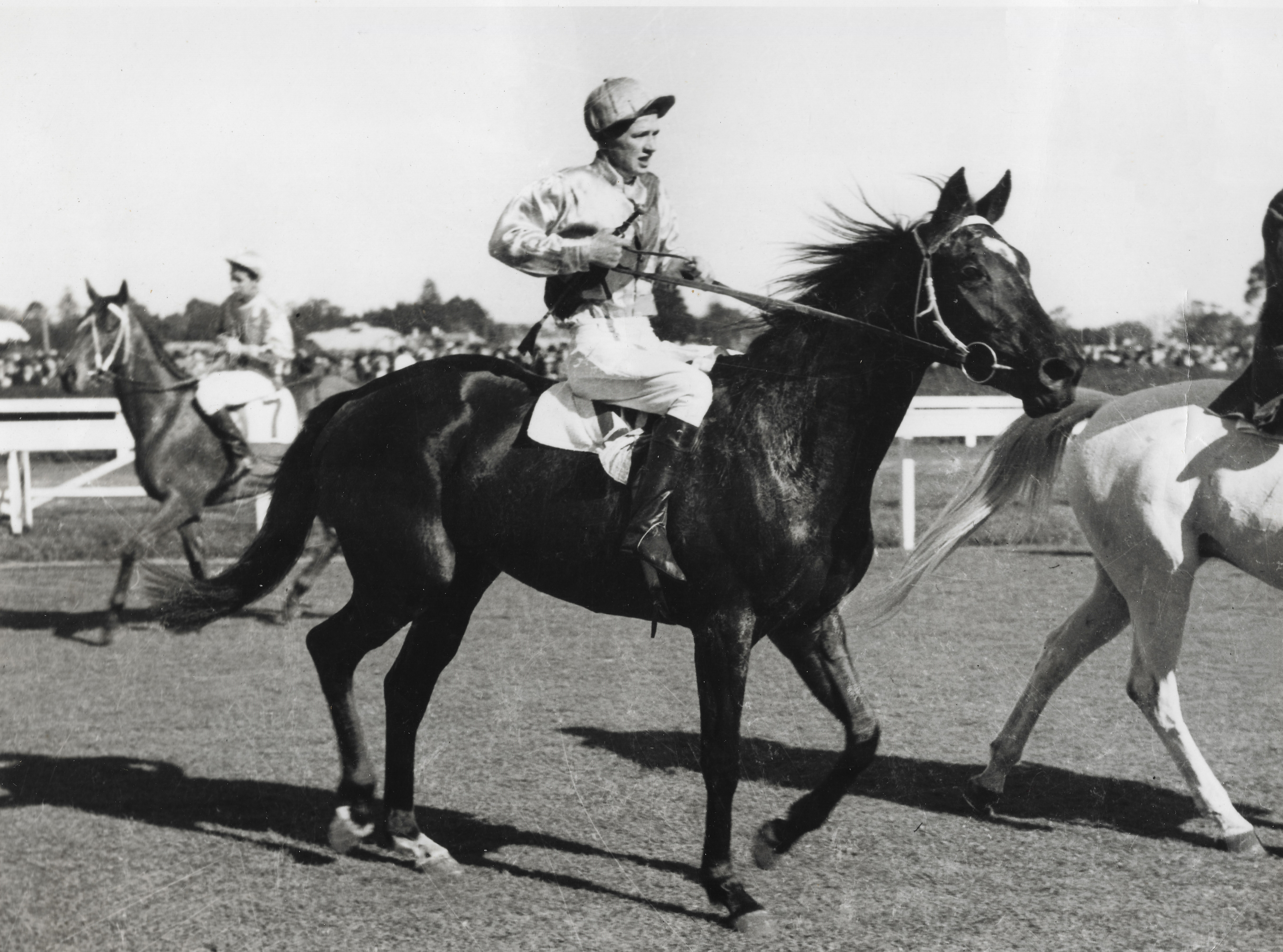
Chicquita, 1951 winner

== History ==
The race is named after Alister Clark, the foundation chairman of the Moonee Valley Racing Club and master of Oaklands Hunt Club from 1901 to 1908. He was also the pre-eminent Australian rose breeder of the twentieth century.

The race was first run in 1939 and has had changes in distance and grade. The race at times has been a Weight-for-age event for 3-year-olds and over as evident in 1977 when champion three-year-old filly Surround won the race.

=== 1952 racebook ===
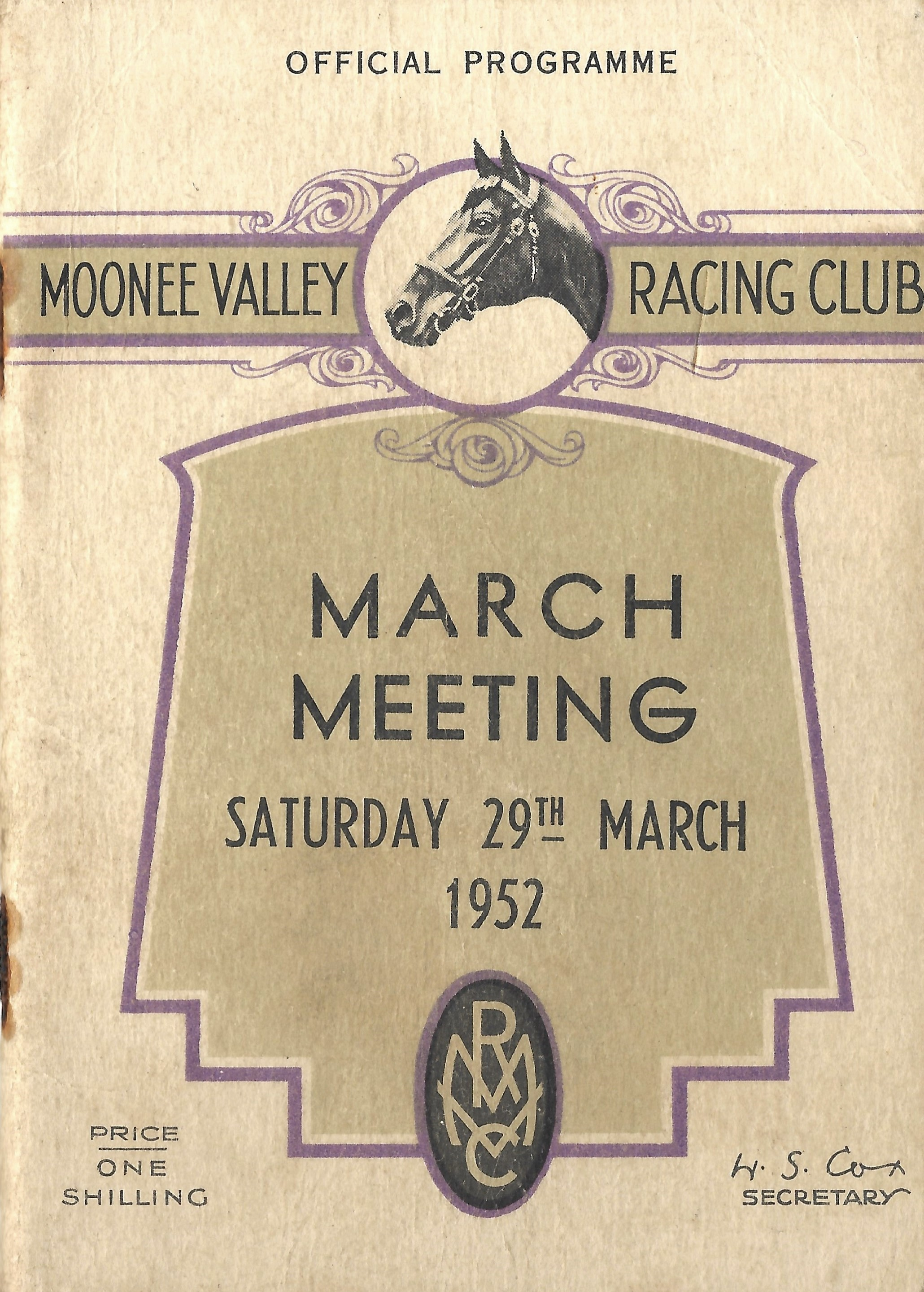
1952 MVRC Alister Clark Stakes racebook front cover

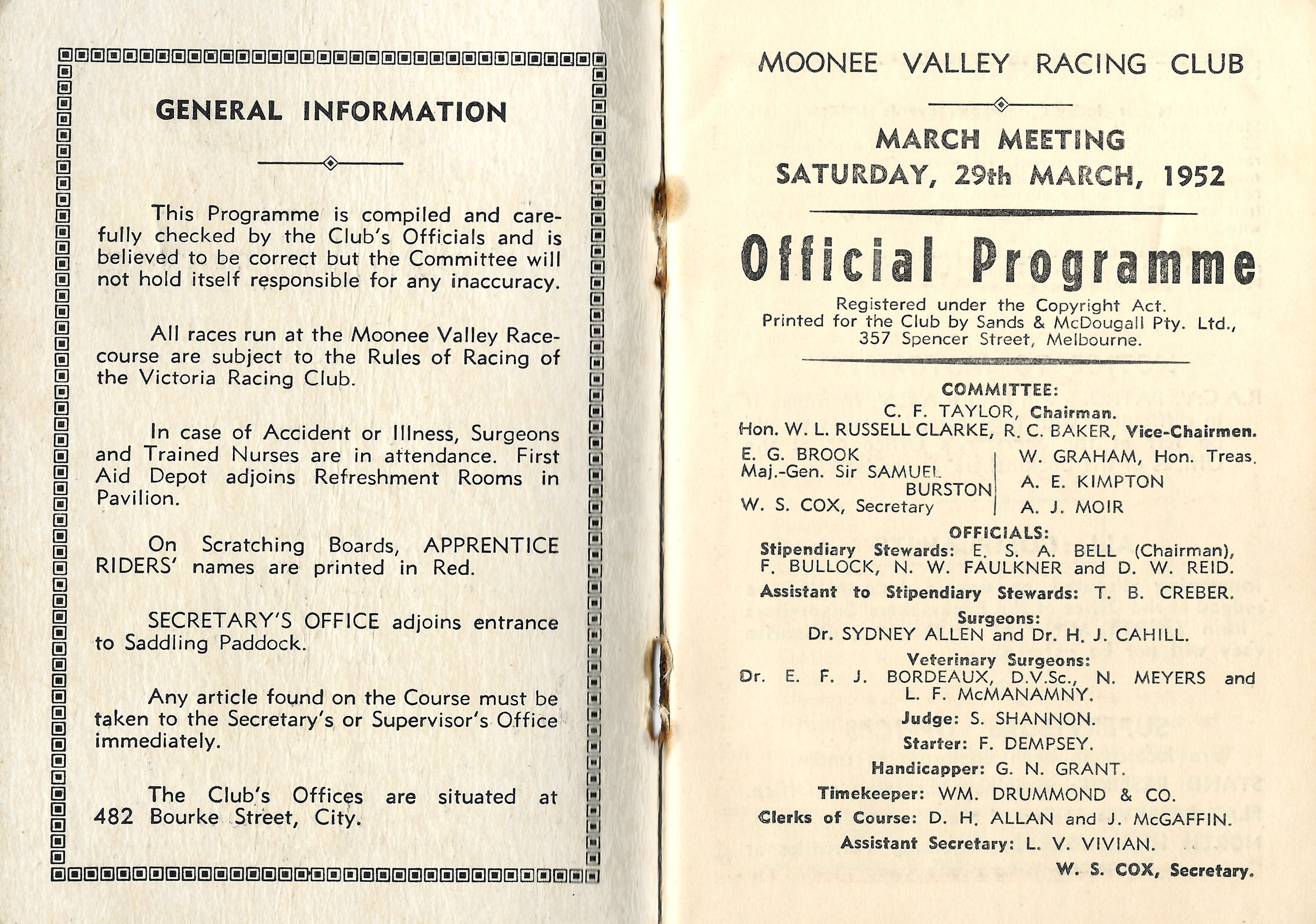
1952 MVRC Alister Clark Stakes showing raceday officials

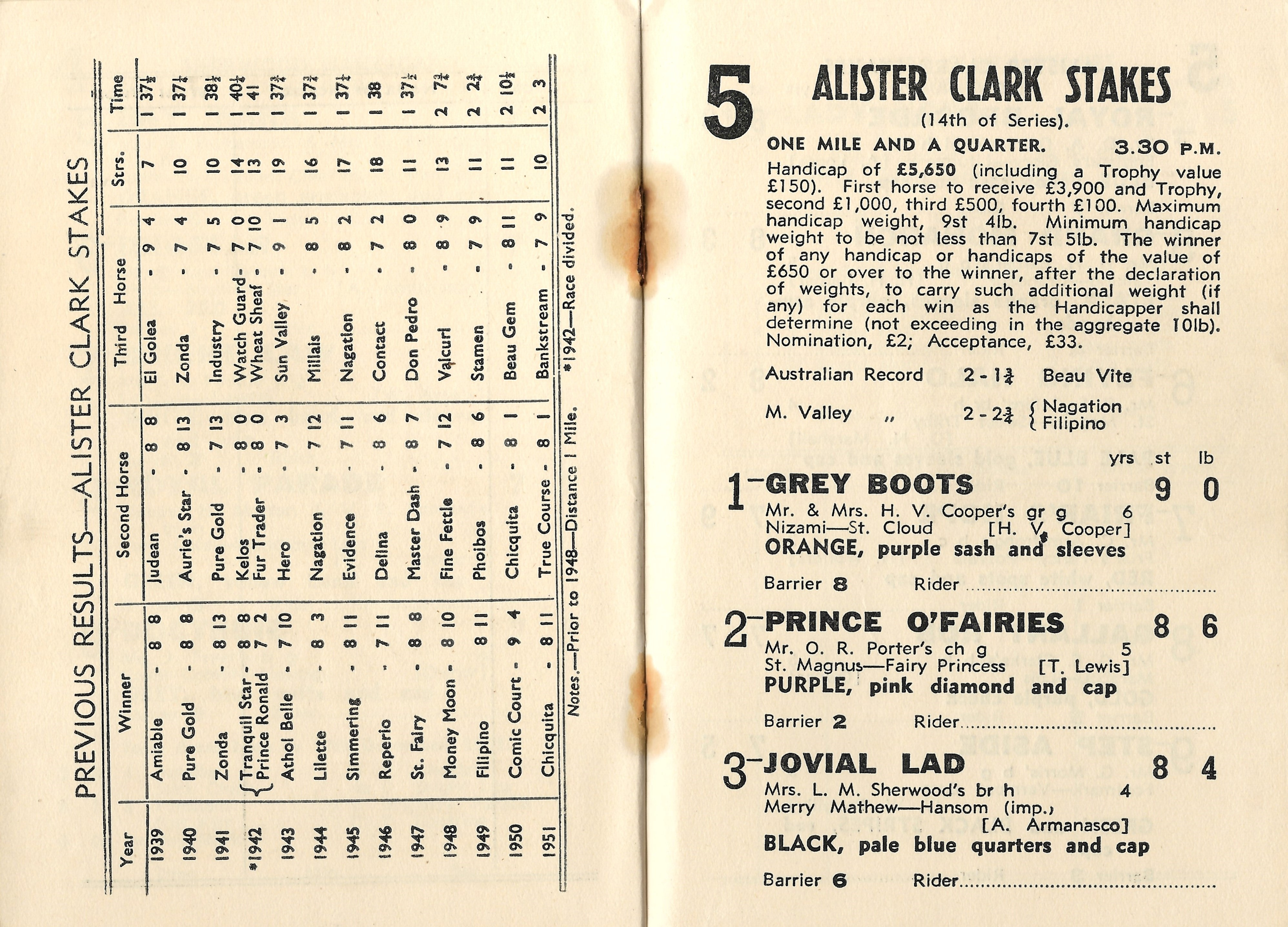
1952 MVRC Alister Clark Stakes starters & results

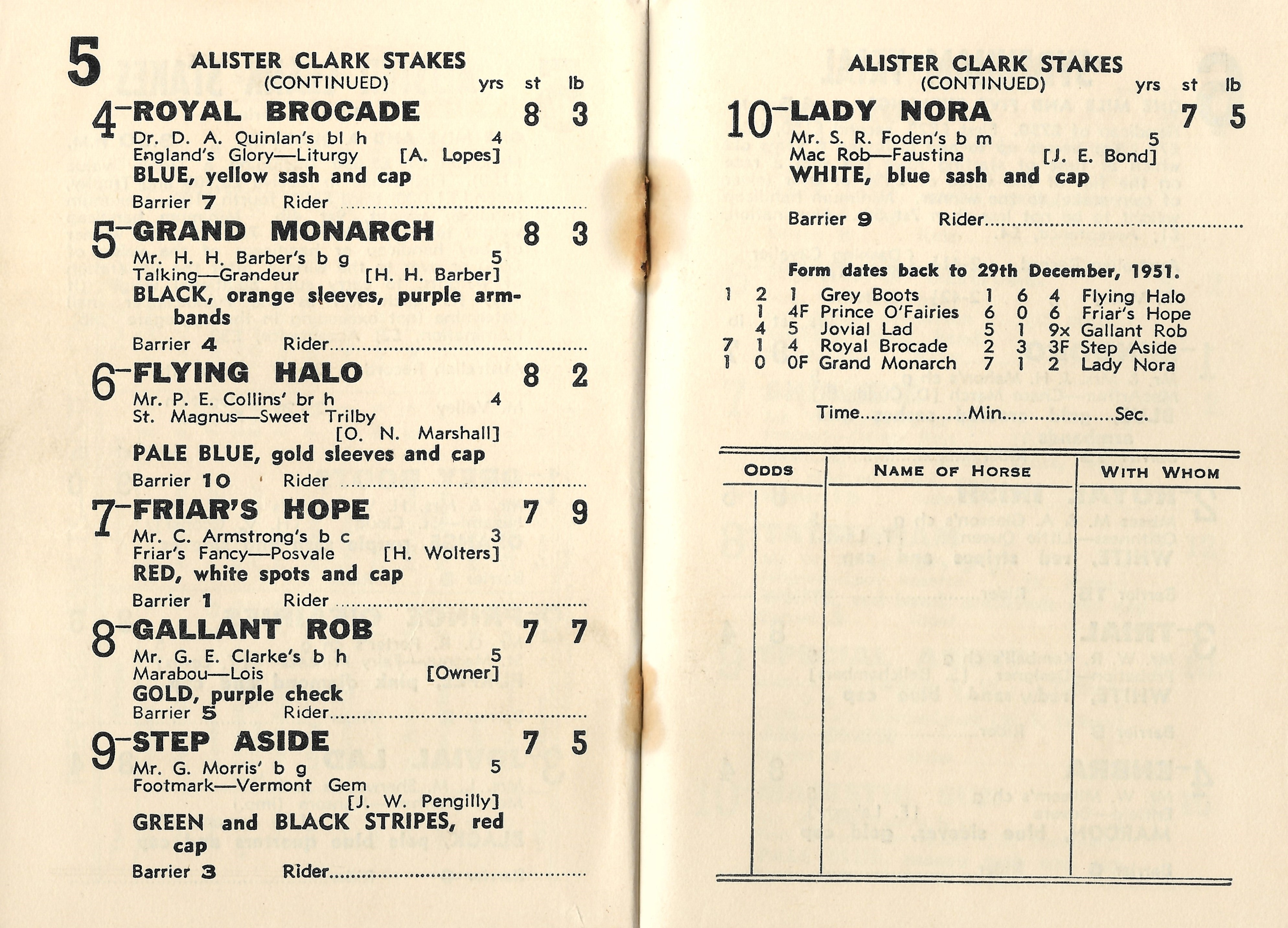
1952 MVRC Alister Clark Stakes showing the winner, Step Aside

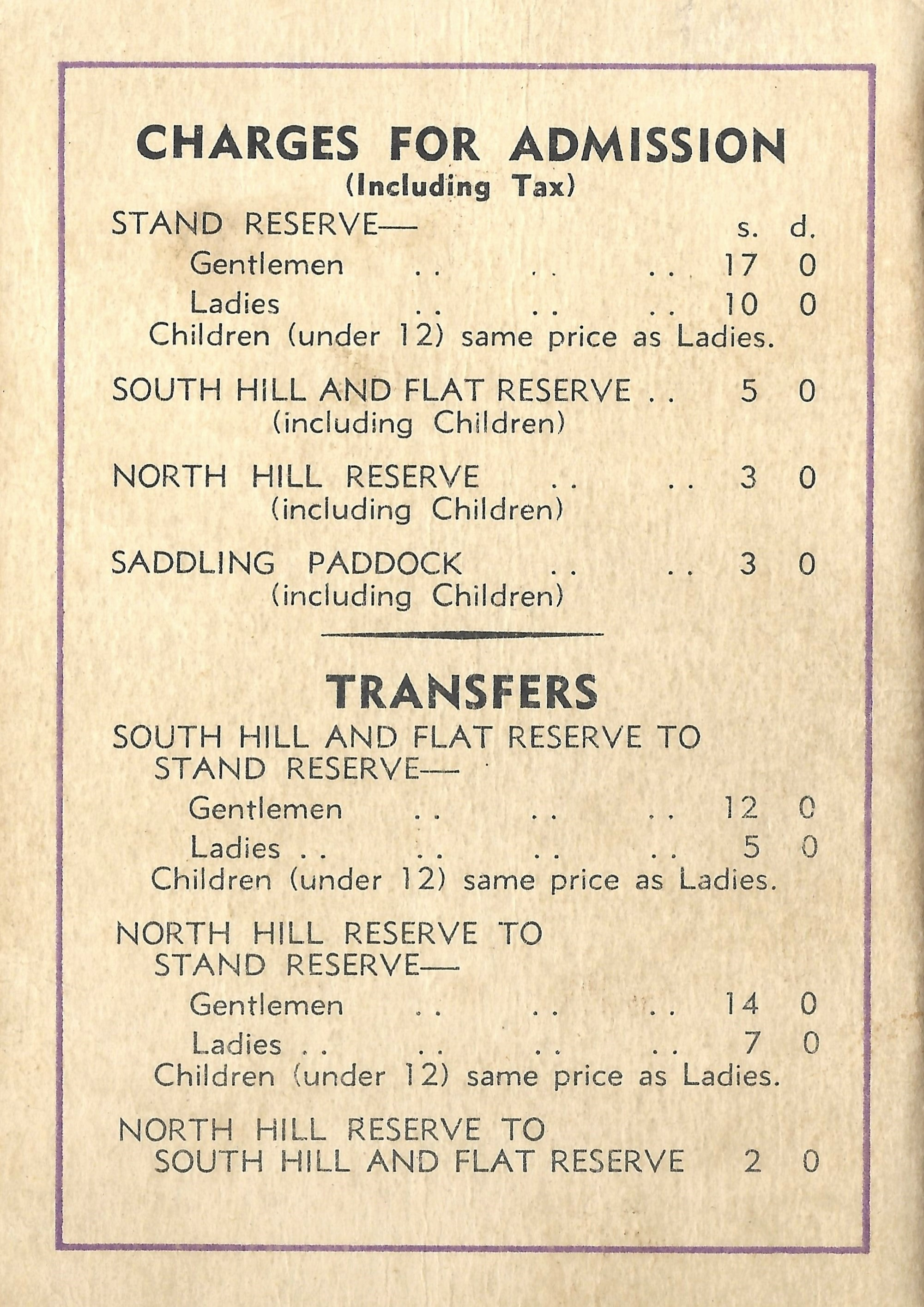
Back cover admission & transfer charges at the entrance gates

=== Grade ===
- 1939–1977 was a Principal race
- 1979 onwards Group 2

=== Distance ===
- 1939–1947 – 1 mile (~1600 metres)
- 1948–1963 – 1 1/4 miles (~2000 metres)
- 1964–1972 – 1 mile (~1600 metres)
- 1973–1986 – 1600 metres
- 1987–1994 – 2040 metres
- 1995 – 2000 metres
- 1996–1997 – 2040 metres
- 1998–2000 – 1600 metres
- 2001 – 1509 metres
- 2002–2010 – 1600 metres
- 2011 onwards – 2040 metres

=== Venue ===
Although a Mooonee Valley race, it has been held:

- 1995 at Flemington.
- 2026 at Caulfield.

== Winners ==
The following are past winners of the race.

- 2026 - Roulette King
- 2025 - Shanwah
- 2024 - Antrim Coast
- 2023 - Bank Maur
- 2022 - Prix De Turn
- 2021 - Grandslam
- 2020 – Nonconformist
- 2019 – Global Exchange
- 2018 – Cliff's Edge
- 2017 – Hardham
- 2016 – Tally
- 2015 – Chill Party
- 2014 – Pheidon
- 2013 – Philippi
- 2012 – Highly Recommended
- 2011 – Domesky
- 2010 – Linton
- 2009 – Pre Eminence
- 2008 – Sound Journey
- 2007 – Casino Prince
- 2006 – Spinney
- 2005 – Lieutenant
- 2004 – Speedy King
- 2003 – Titanic Jack
- 2002 – Royal Code
- 2001 – Mr. Murphy
- 2000 – Pins
- 1999 – Dignity Dancer
- 1998 – Zonda
- 1997 – Flak Jacket
- 1996 – Scenic Royale
- 1995 – Blevic
- 1994 – Tristalove
- 1993 – Sarason
- 1992 – Naturalism
- 1991 – Durbridge
- 1990 – Zabeel
- 1989 – Bar Landy
- 1988 – Flotilla
- 1987 – Vo Rogue
- 1986 – Lockley's Tradition
- 1985 – King Phoenix
- 1984 – Penny Edition
- 1983 – My Evita
- 1982 – Fearless Pride
- 1981 – My Brown Jug
- 1980 – Bit of a Skite
- 1979 – Family Of Man
- 1978 – race not held
- 1977 – †Family Of Man / Surround
- 1976 – Leica Show
- 1975 – race not held
- 1974 – Toltrice
- 1973 – The Frigate
- 1972 – Upstairs
- 1971 – Tauto
- 1970 – Cyron
- 1969 – Begonia Belle
- 1968 – Heroic Stone
- 1967 – race not held
- 1966 – Bowl King
- 1965 – Sir Dane
- 1964 – Sometime
- 1963 – Sometime
- 1962 – Aquanita
- 1961 – Dhaulagiri
- 1960 – Stormy Passage
- 1959 – Wiggle
- 1958 – Baron Boissier
- 1957 – Mac's Amber
- 1956 – Glitzern
- 1955 – St. Joel
- 1954 – Gallant Archer
- 1953 – Hydrogen
- 1952 – Step Aside
- 1951 – Chicquita
- 1950 – Comic Court
- 1949 – Filipino
- 1948 – Money Moon
- 1947 – St. Fairy
- 1946 – Reperio
- 1945 – Simmering
- 1944 – Lilette
- 1943 – Athol Belle
- 1942 – ‡Tranquil Star / Prince Ronald
- 1941 – Zonda
- 1940 – Pure Gold
- 1939 – Amiable

† Dead heat
‡ Race run in Divisions

== See also ==
- Alexandra Stakes (MVRC)
- Sunline Stakes
- Typhoon Tracy Stakes
- William Reid Stakes
- List of Australian Group races
- Group races
