= William Reid Stakes =

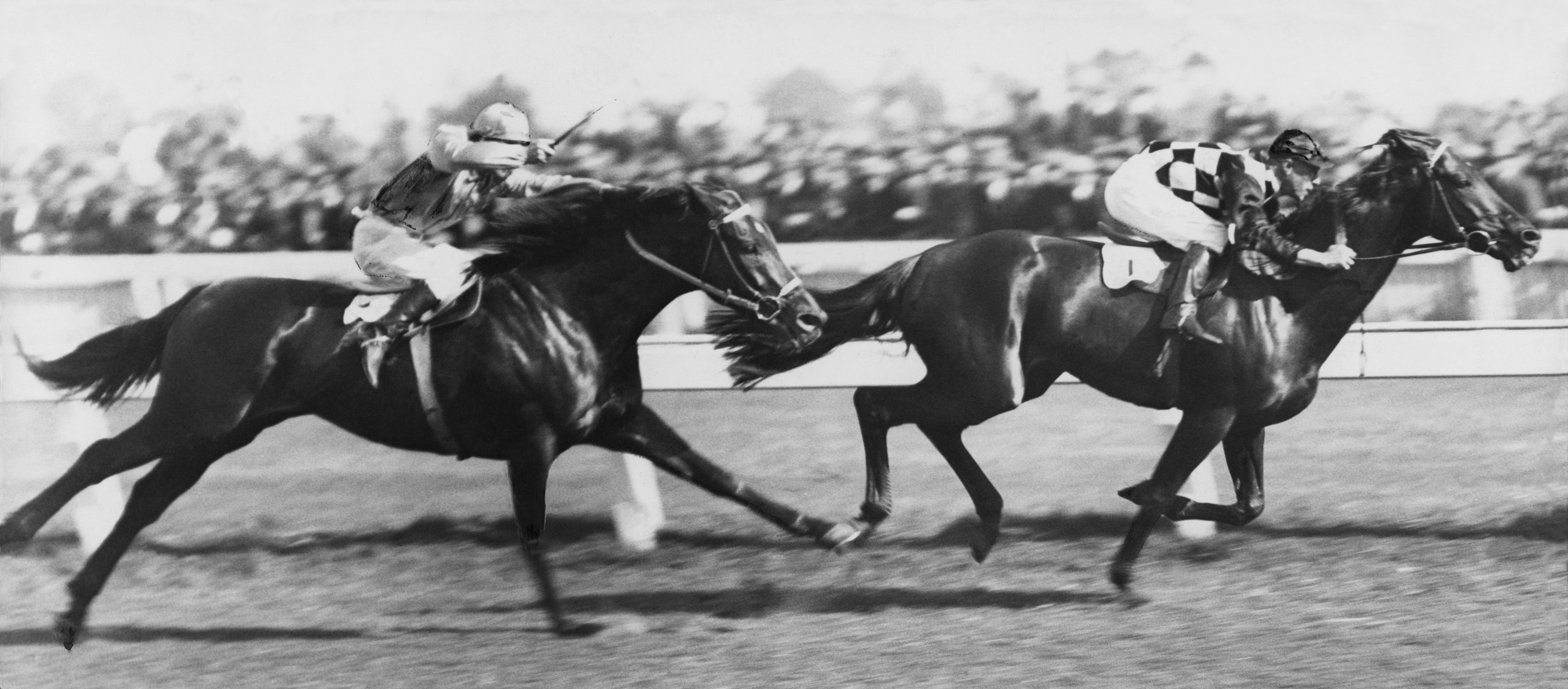
- Gothic, 1929 winner
- Class: Group 1
- Location: Caulfield Racecourse or Moonee Valley Racecourse, Melbourne
- Inaugurated: 1925
- Race type: Thoroughbred
- Sponsor: Ladbrokes (2026)

Race information
- Distance: 1,200 metres
- Surface: Turf
- Track: Left-handed
- Qualification: Three year old and older
- Weight: Weight for Age
- Purse: $1,000,000 (2026)

The William Reid Stakes is a horse race of Moonee Valley Racing Club Group 1 thoroughbred racing at Weight for Age, for three year olds and older, run over a distance of 1200 metres at Moonee Valley Racecourse, Melbourne, Australia in March.

With Moonee Valley under redevelopment the race was moved to Caulfield in 2026.

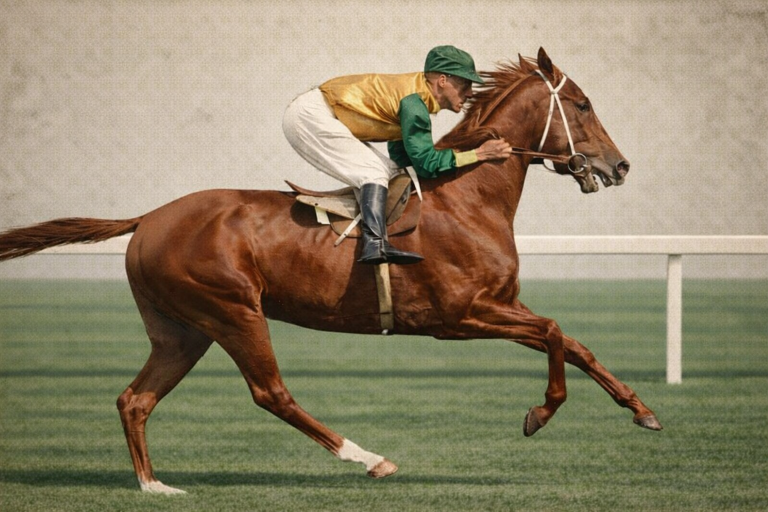
Heroic, 1927 winner

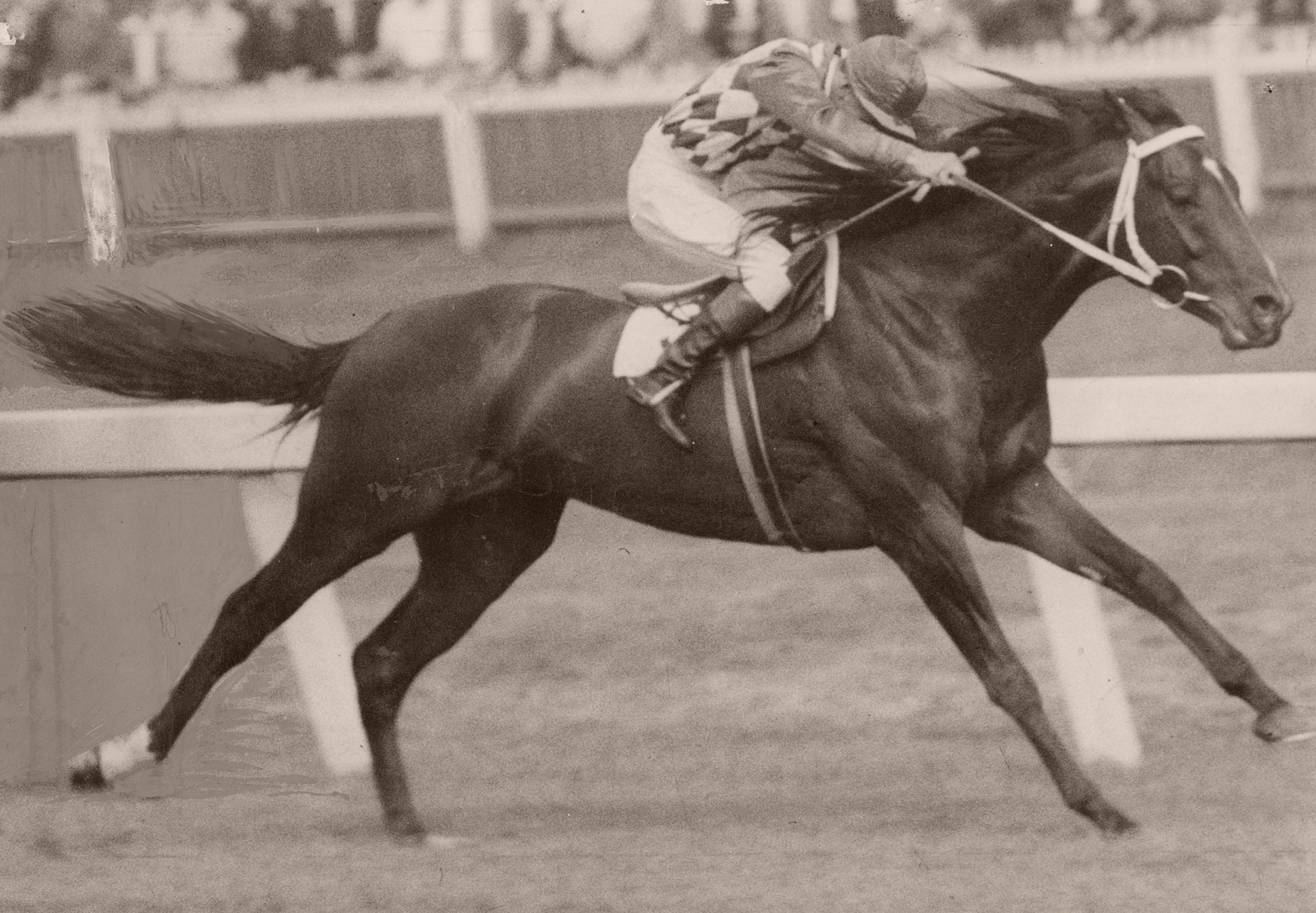
Comic Court, 1951 winner

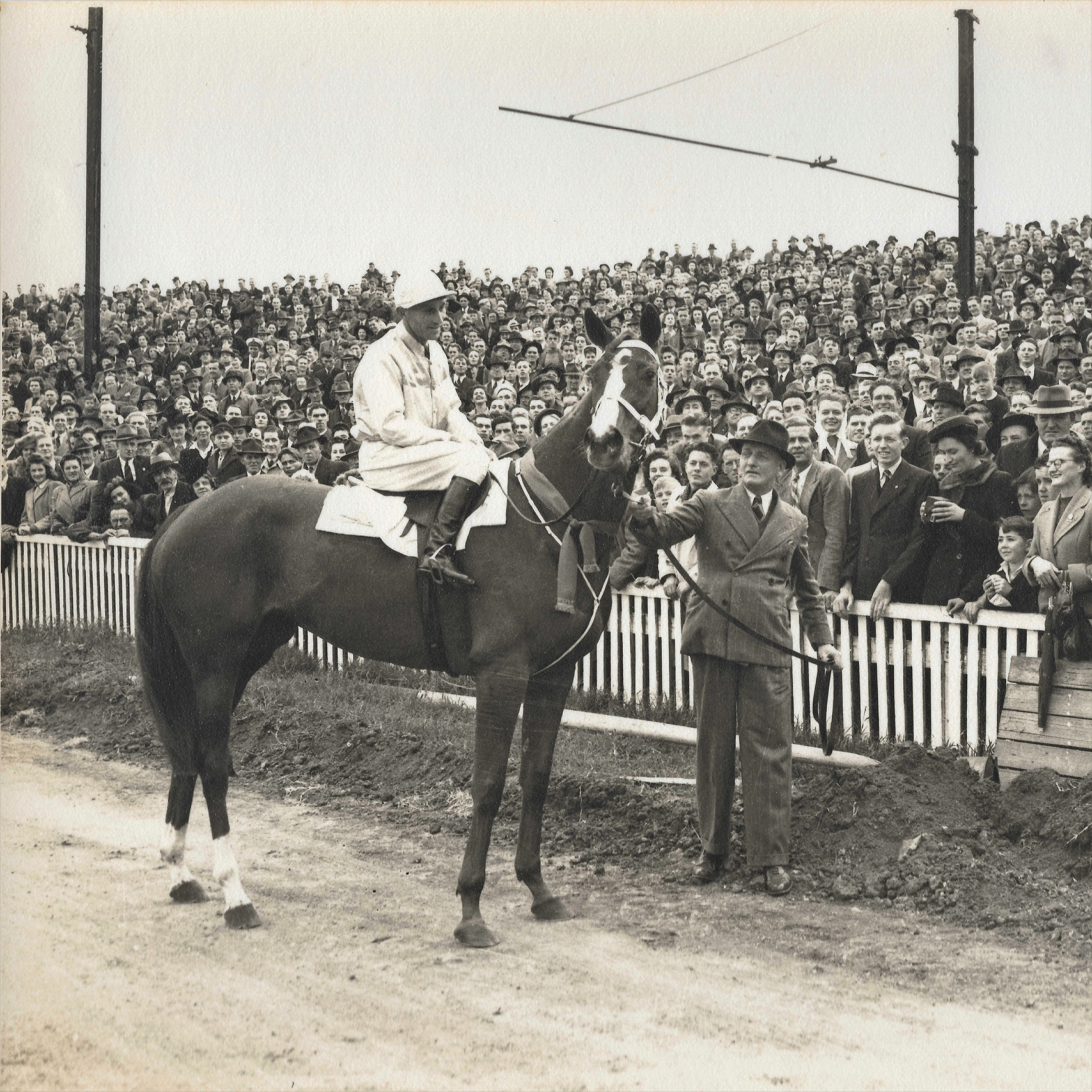
Tranquil Star, 1946 winner

== History ==
The race has been won by a few champions including Manikato who won the race five consecutive times from 1979 to 1983. Also noted champions Black Caviar and Miss Andretti won the race before being successful at Royal Ascot.

From 2005 to 2007 it was the second leg of the Global Sprint Challenge, preceded by the Lightning Stakes and followed by the King's Stand Stakes. It has now been replaced as an Australian leg of the Global Sprint Challenge series by The Age Classic.

=== Name ===
The William Reid Stakes was named after William Reid, a former committee member of the Moonee Valley Racing Club. Originally from Morayshire, Scotland, William Reid was a Victorian Banker and racehorse owner who died in 1923. He was the owner of a number of prominent racehorses in the early 1900s including Uncle Sam, who won the Caulfield Cup in 1912 and 1914. Uncle Sam also ran third in the Melbourne Cup in 1912 who stood at his Glen Orla Stud in Sunbury.

During the period 1996–2001 the race was held on the Australia Day holiday weekend. In 2002 the event was moved to March while the Norman Carlyon Stakes which was the same distance and race conditions was rescheduled for the Australia Day holiday weekend. Later in 2010 that event was renamed to the Australia Stakes and to this date continues to be raced under the given name.

- 1925–1993 - William Reid Stakes
- 1994–1995 - Australia Made Stakes
- 1996–2009 - Australia Stakes
- 2010 onwards - William Reid Stakes

=== Distance ===
- 1925–1972 - 6 furlongs (~1200 metres)
- 1973 onwards - 1200 metres

=== Grade ===
- 1925–1979 - Principal race
- 1980–1986 - Group 2
- 1987 onwards - Group 1

=== Venue ===
Traditionally held at Moonee Valley, the race has also been held at:

- Flemington Racecourse (1995)
- Caulfield from 2026.

=== Foreign entries ===
In 2005, Cape of Good Hope became the first overseas runner to win this race.

=== Recent multiple winners ===
Jockeys

- Craig Williams (2018, 2020, 2022)

Trainers

- Peter Moody (2011. 2013, 2016)

=== 1950 racebook ===
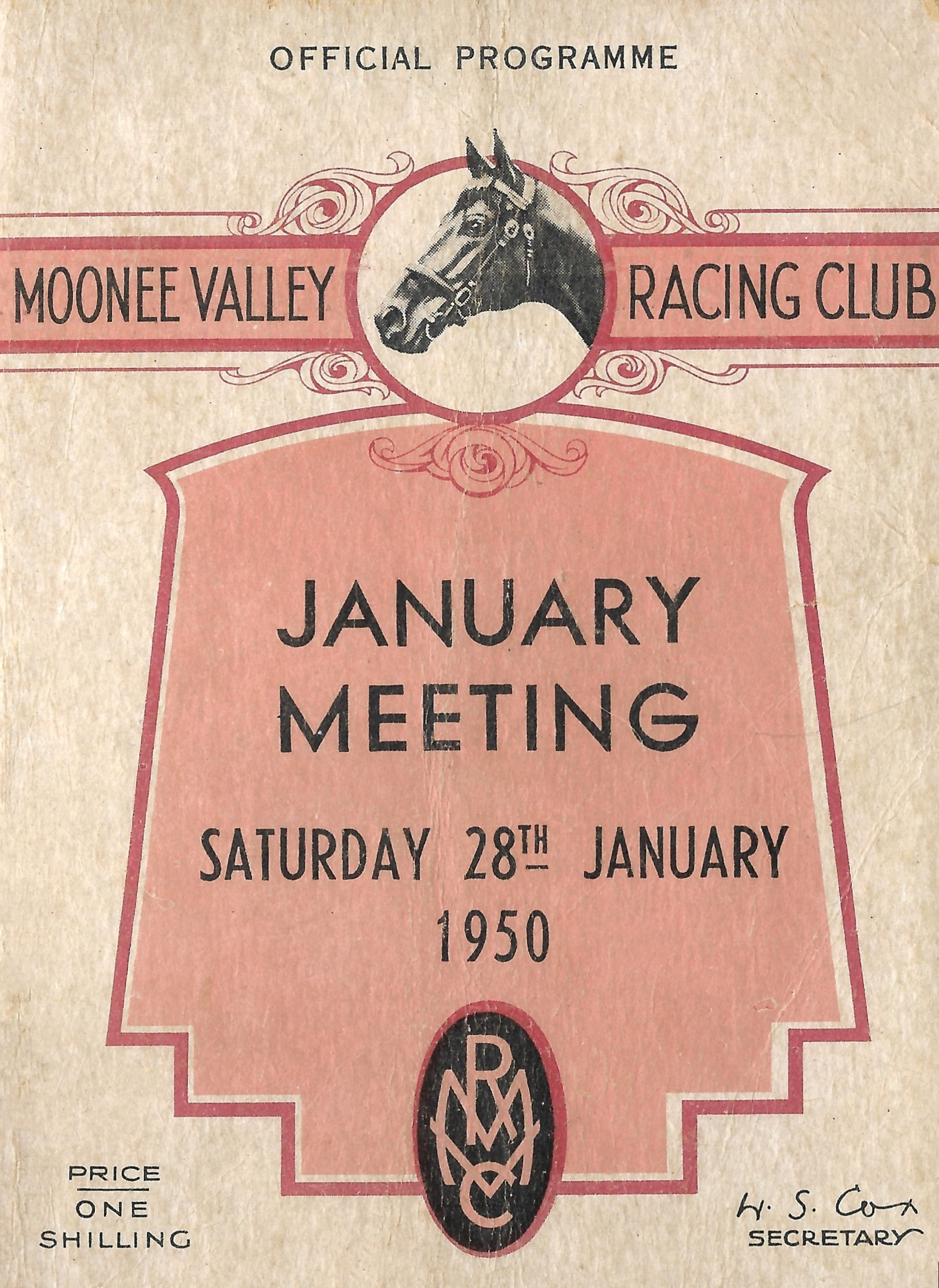
1950 MVRC William Reid Stakes racebook front cover

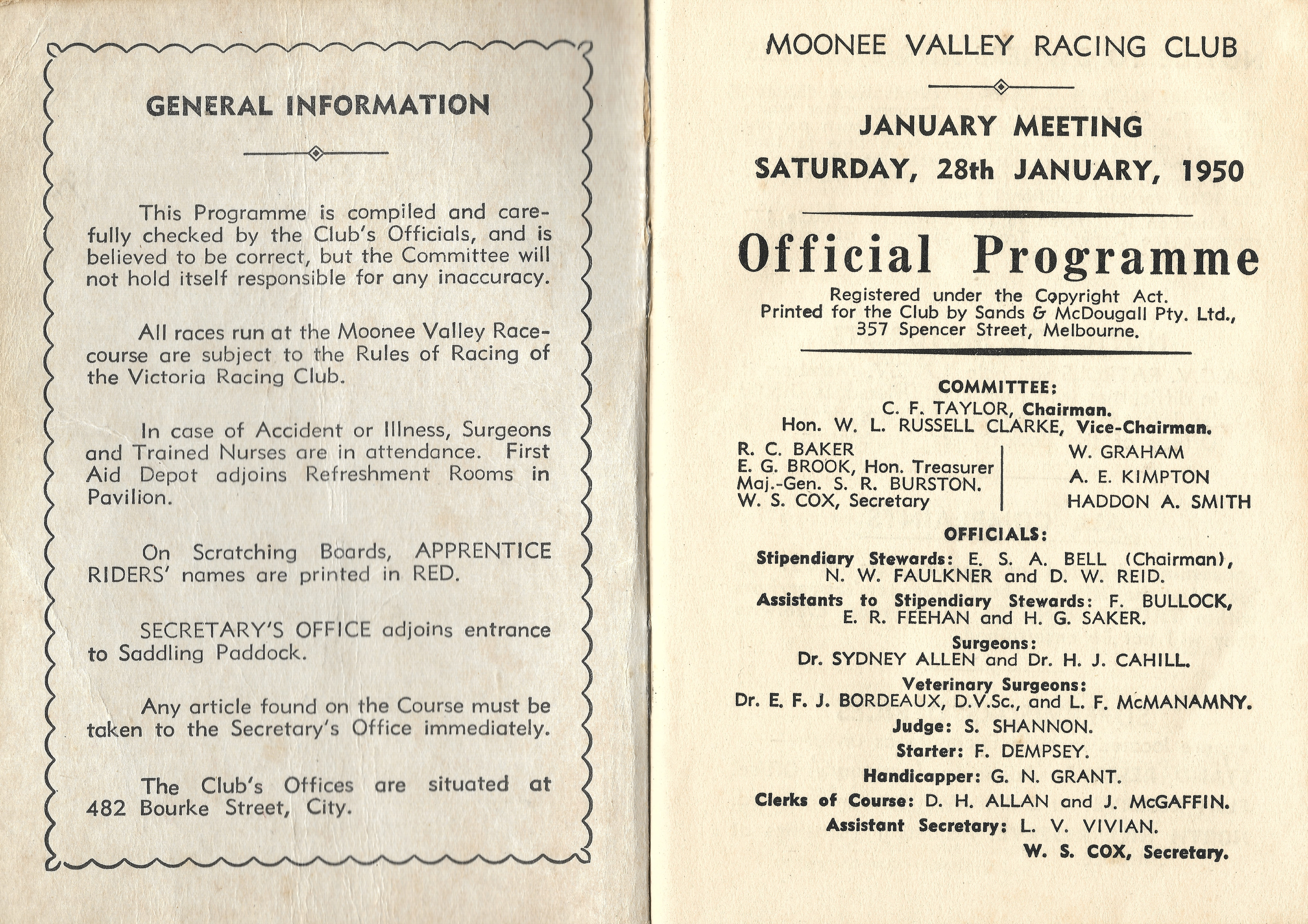
1950 MVRC William Reid Stakes showing raceday officials

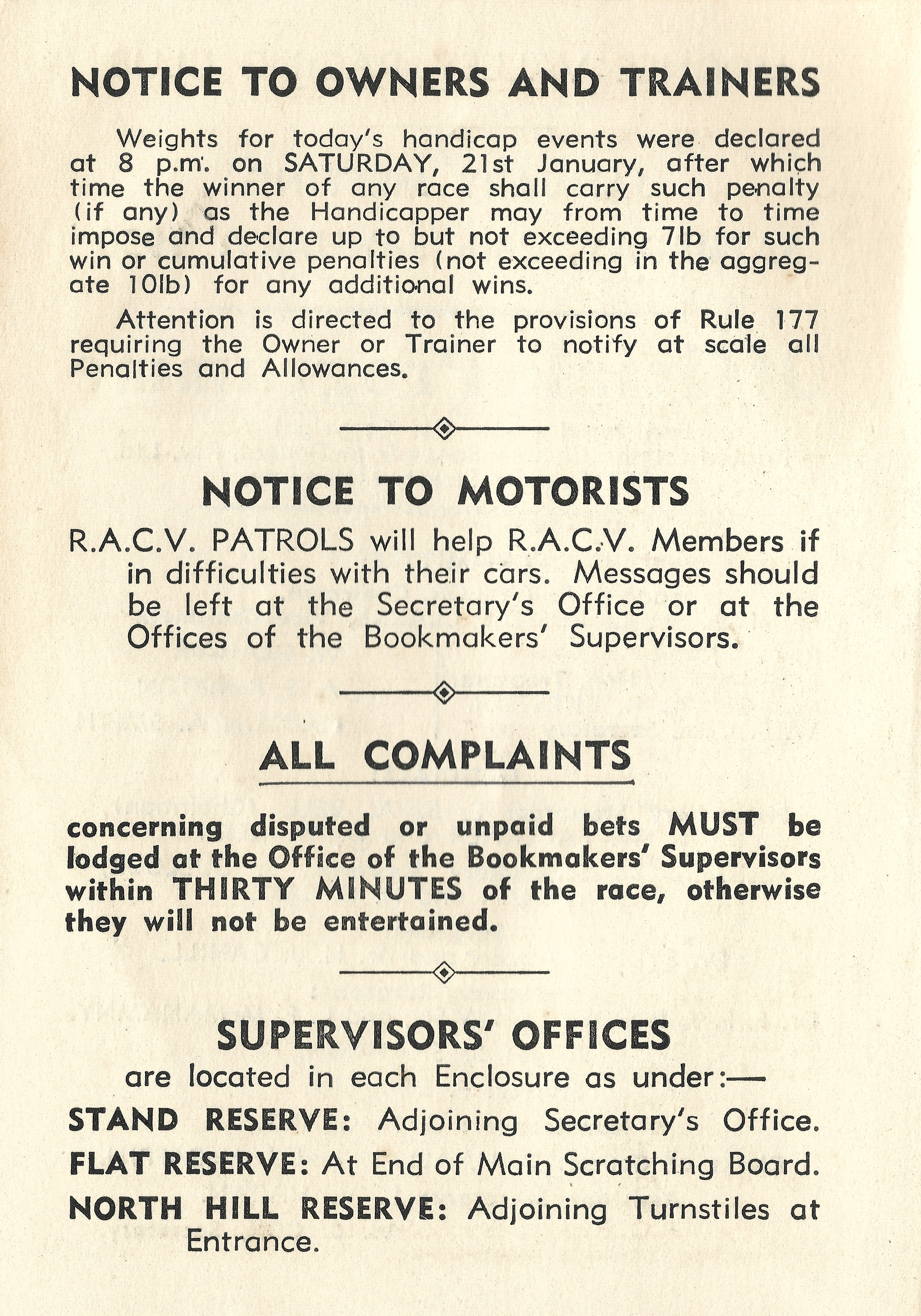
1950 MVRC William Reid Stakes showing raceday notices

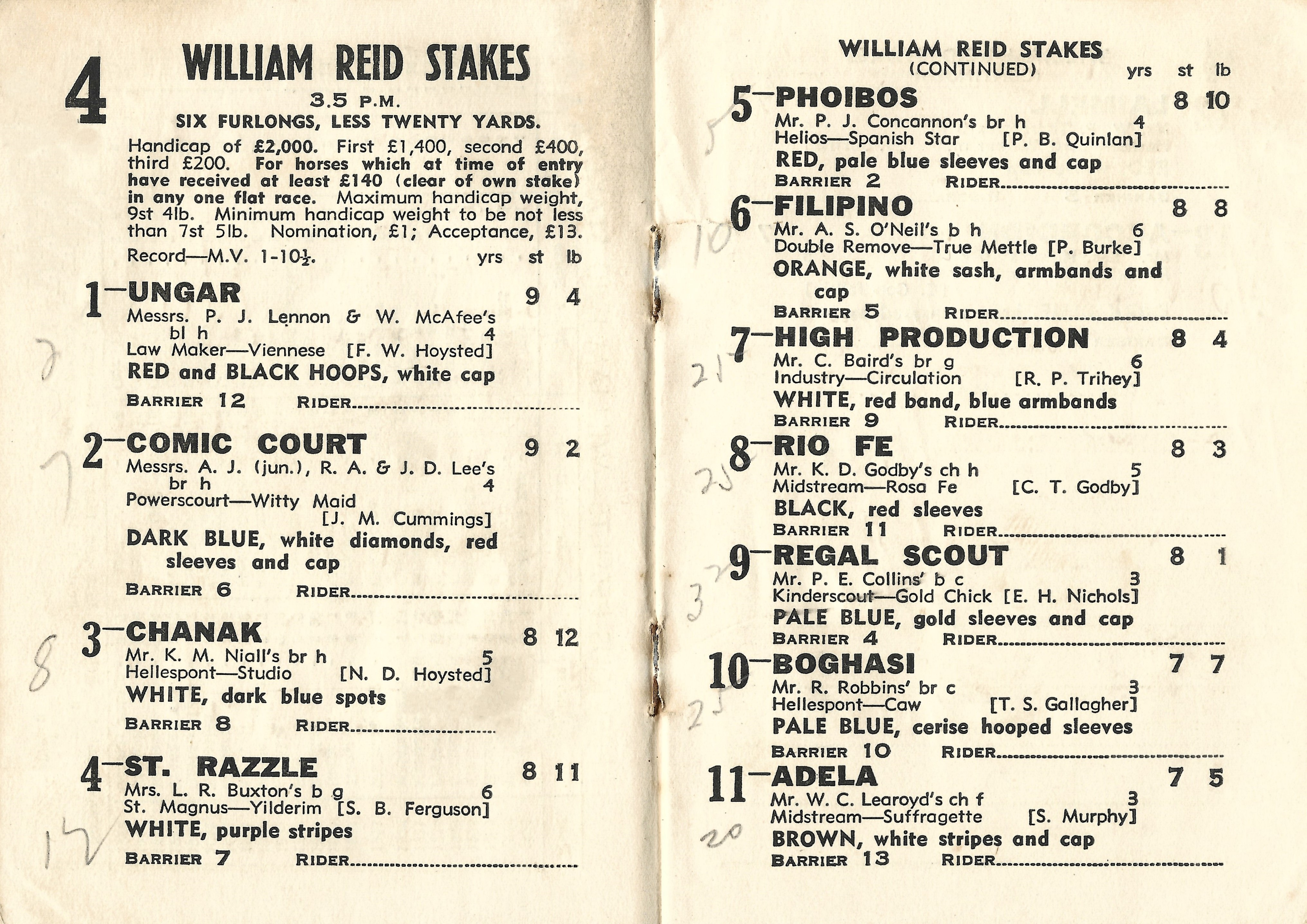
1950 MVRC William Reid Stakes showing the winner, Filipino

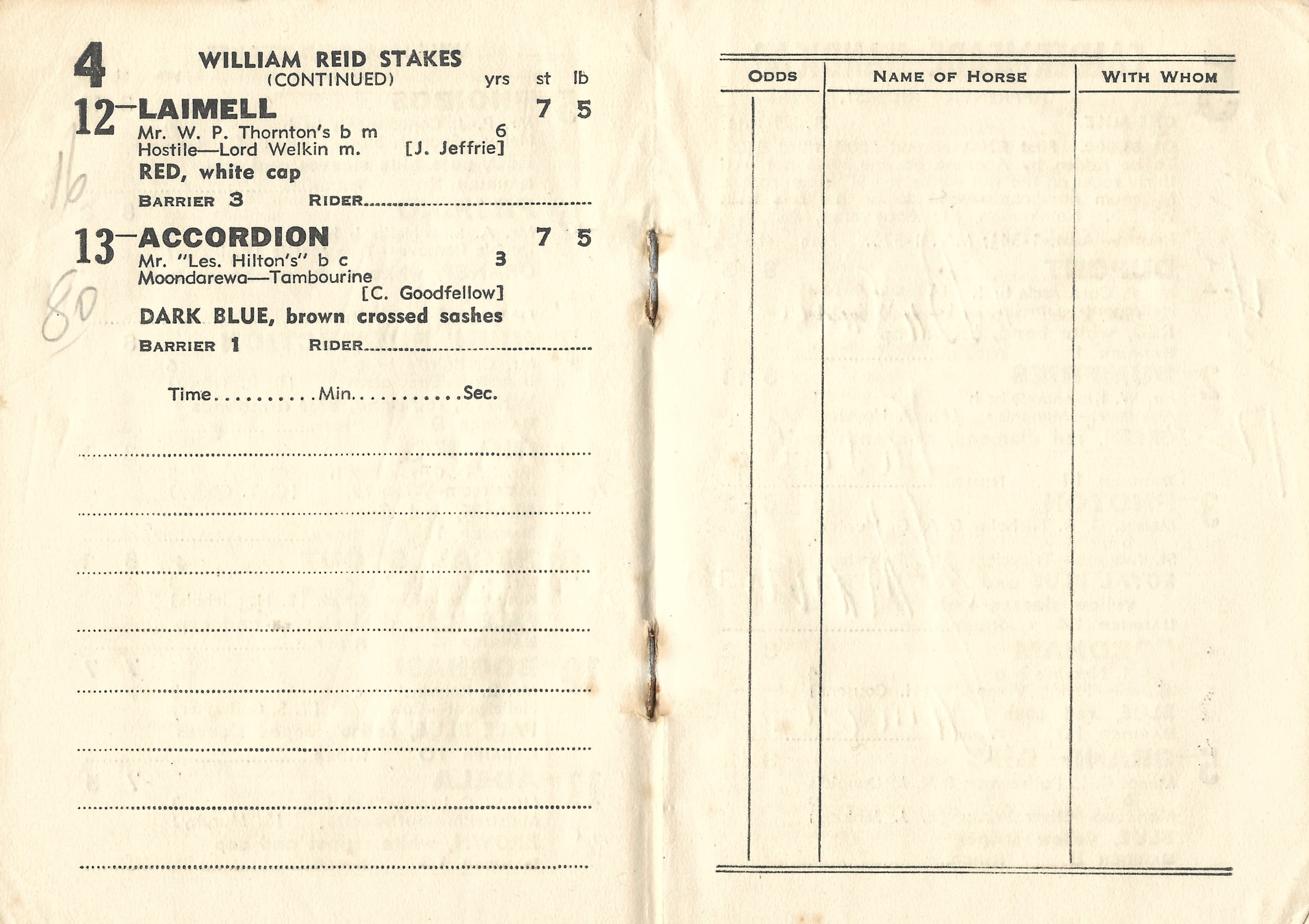
1950 MVRC William Reid Stakes starters and results

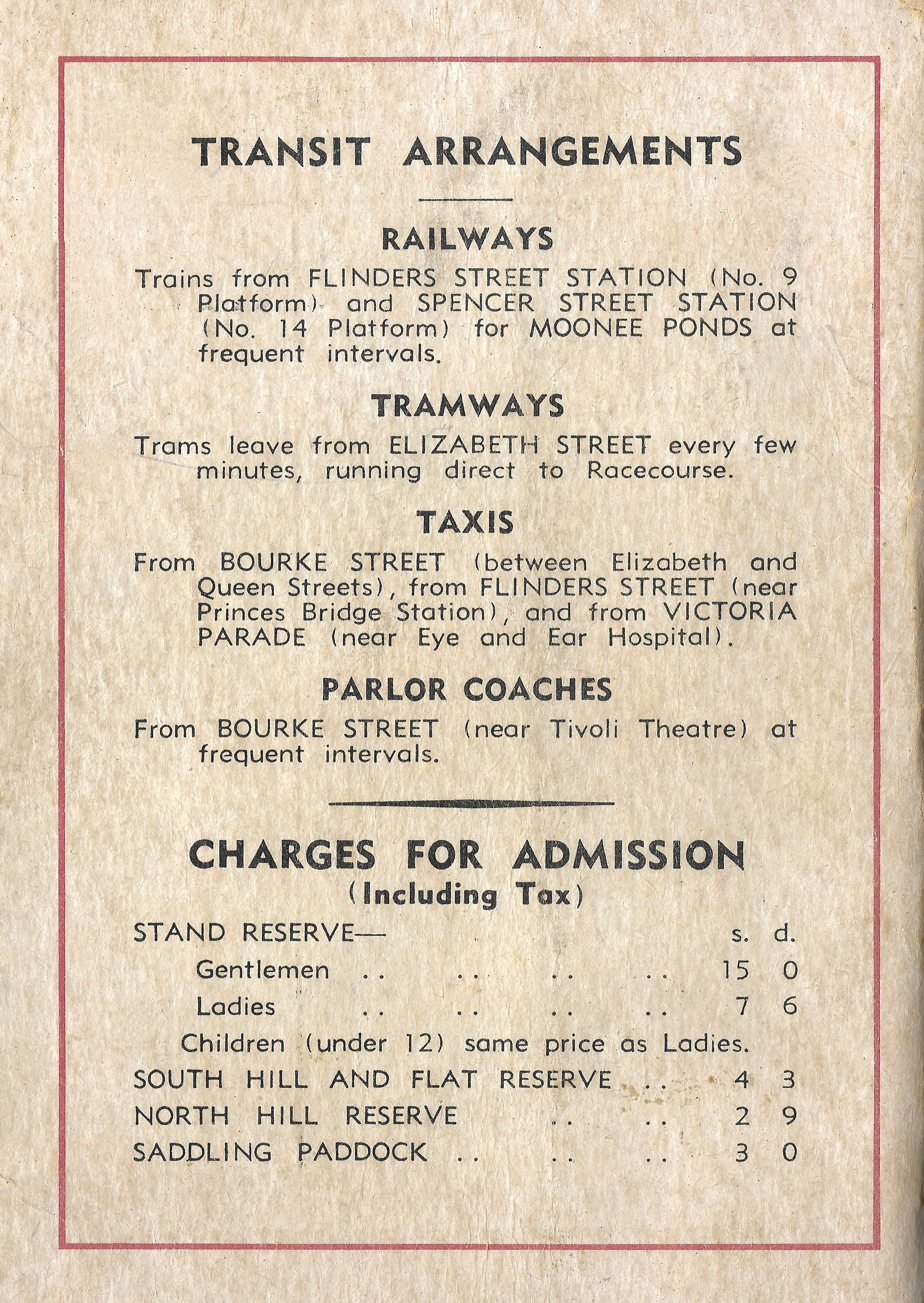
Back cover showing railway and admission charges

== Winners ==
The following are past winners of the race.

- 2026 - Jigsaw
- 2025 - Schwarz
- 2024 - Imperatriz
- 2023 - Imperatriz
- 2022 - September Run
- 2021 - Masked Crusader
- 2020 - Loving Gaby
- 2019 - Sunlight
- 2018 - Hellbent
- 2017 - Silent Sedition
- 2016 - Flamberge
- 2015 - Lucky Hussler
- 2014 - Spirit Of Boom
- 2013 - Black Caviar
- 2012 - Foxwedge
- 2011 - Black Caviar
- 2010 - Turffontein
- 2009 - Apache Cat
- 2008 - Apache Cat
- 2007 - Miss Andretti
- 2006 - Virage De Fortune
- 2005 - Cape of Good Hope
- 2004 - Regimental Gal
- 2003 - Yell
- 2002 - Toledo
- 2001 - Bomber Bill
- 2000 - Miss Pennymoney
- 1999 - Grand Archway
- 1998 - Stella Cadente
- 1997 - Spartacus
- 1996 - Strategic
- 1995 - Hareeba
- 1994 - Lady Jakeo
- 1993 - Spanish Mix
- 1992 - Wrap Around
- 1991 - Redelva
- 1990 - Lightning Bend
- 1989 - Zedative
- 1988 - Vo Rogue
- 1987 - Canny Lass
- 1986 - Campaign King
- 1985 - River Rough
- 1984 - Qubeau
- 1983 - Manikato
- 1982 - Manikato
- 1981 - Manikato
- 1980 - Manikato
- 1979 - Manikato
- 1978 - Family Of Man
- 1977 - Toy Show
- 1976 - Lord Dudley
- 1975 - Leica Show
- 1974 - All Shot
- 1973 - All Shot
- 1972 - Dual Choice
- 1971 - Tango Miss
- 1970 - Crewman
- 1969 - Magic Ruler
- 1968 - Winfreux
- 1967 - Marmion
- 1966 - Star Affair
- 1965 - Contempler
- 1964 - Check Up
- 1963 - Nikalapko
- 1962 - New Statesman
- 1961 - Lady Major
- 1960 - Planetoid
- 1959 - Merger
- 1958 - Golden Doubles
- 1957 - Golden Doubles
- 1956 - Joda Boy
- 1955 - Flying Halo
- 1954 - St. Joel
- 1953 - Flying Halo
- 1952 - Flying Halo
- 1951 - Comic Court
- 1950 - Filipino
- 1949 - Comedy Prince
- 1948 - Chanak
- 1947 - Bravesia
- 1946 - Tranquil Star
- 1945 - David’s Last
- 1944 - Reception
- 1943 - race not held
- 1942 - Chatasan
- 1941 - All Veil
- 1940 - Magic Circle
- 1939 - Amiable
- 1938 - Hua
- 1937 - Pamelus
- 1936 - race not held
- 1935 - Heros
- 1934 - Heros
- 1933 - Waltzing Lily
- 1932 - Middle Watch
- 1931 - Mystic Peak
- 1930 - Figure
- 1929 - Gothic
- 1928 - Translator
- 1927 - Heroic
- 1926 - The Night Patrol
- 1925 - The Night Patrol

== See also ==
- Alexandra Stakes (MVRC)
- Alister Clark Stakes
- Sunline Stakes
- Typhoon Tracy Stakes
- List of Australian Group races
- Group races
