= Family of Man (horse) =

Australian-bred Thoroughbred racehorse

- Sire: Lots of Man (USA)
- Grandsire: Bold Commander (USA)
- Dam: Colleen (AUS)
- Damsire: Karendi (AUS)
- Sex: Stallion
- Foaled: 1973
- Country: Australia
- Colour: Bay or Brown
- Breeder: L A Bartlett
- Trainer: George Hanlon
- Record: 78: 21-15-14
- Earnings: A$650,540

Major wins
- Alister Clark Stakes (1977 & 1979); Caulfield Stakes (1977); W S Cox Plate (1977); William Reid Stakes (1978); Mackinnon Stakes (1978)

Family of Man was a champion Australian thoroughbred racehorse.

A son of Lots of Man (USA) from the mare Colleen, he was foaled in 1973 and was trained throughout his career by George Hanlon.

Family Of Man started in 78 races and raced until he was 7 years old.

Although his career finished before the introduction of Group race classifications, he won seven races which now carry the Group One tag.

His biggest win was in the 1977 Cox Plate when ridden by Brent Thomson.

In 1979, he was sold to millionaire Robert Holmes à Court and stood at stud for one season but soon returned to the racetrack in 1980.

During his career, he raced and won in every season from the age of two until seven and was successful over distances ranging from 1,100m to 3,200m.
