= Sunline Stakes =

Sunline Stakes registered as the Diamond Jubilee Stakes
- Class: Group 2
- Location: Caulfield Racecourse / Moonee Valley Racecourse
- Inaugurated: 1981
- Race type: Thoroughbred
- Sponsor: Packaging Needs (2025-26)

Race information
- Distance: 1,600 metres
- Surface: Turf
- Qualification: Fillies and mares three years old and older
- Weight: Weight for Age
- Purse: $300,000 (2026)

The Sunline Stakes, registered as the Diamond Jubilee Stakes, is a Moonee Valley Racing Club Group 2 Thoroughbred horse race for fillies and mares three years old and older, under Weight for Age conditions, over a distance of 1600 metres at Moonee Valley Racecourse, Melbourne, Australia.

With Moonee Valley under redevelopment the race was moved to Caulfield in 2026.

== History ==
=== Name ===
The race is named in honour of the champion mare Sunline. The mare won nine times at this distance including the Hong Kong Mile.

- 1981–1999 - Diamond Jubilee Stakes
- 2000 - Anthea Crawford Stakes
- 2001 onwards - Sunline Stakes

=== Distance ===
- 1981–1994 - 1600 metres
- 1995 - 1623 metres (held at Flemington Racecourse)
- 1996–2004 – 1600 metres
- 2005 – 1500 metres
- 2006 onwards - 1600 metres

=== Grade ===
- 1981–1990 - Listed Race
- 1991–1995 - Group 3
- 1996 onwards - Group 2

== Winners ==
The following are past winners of the race.

- 2026 - Treasurethe Moment
- 2025 - Grinzinger Belle
- 2024 - Eternal Flame
- 2023 - Sirileo Miss
- 2022 - Shout The Bar
- 2021 - Quantum Mechanic
- 2020 - Mamzelle Tess
- 2019 - Consensus
- 2018 - Spanish Reef
- 2017 - I Am A Star
- 2016 - Miss Rose De Lago
- 2015 - Noble Protector
- 2014 - Tex'n Hurley
- 2013 - Spirit Song
- 2012 - Spirit Song
- 2011 - Nakaaya
- 2010 - Zarita
- 2009 - Subtle Cove
- 2008 - Laura's Charm
- 2007 - Like It Is
- 2006 - Candy Vale
- 2005 - Beautiful Gem
- 2004 - Sylvaner
- 2003 - Tickle My
- 2002 - Spurn
- 2001 - Flushed
- 2000 - Rose O’ War
- 1999 - Vonanne
- 1998 - Burning Embers
- 1997 - Prefer An Angel
- 1996 - Suma Peace
- 1995 - Snap
- 1994 - Not Related
- 1993 - Excited Angel
- 1992 - Acushla Marie
- 1991 - Rockets Galore
- 1990 - Marathon Star
- 1989 - Boardwalk Angel
- 1988 - Bianco Flyer
- 1987 - Silver Satellite
- 1986 - Deedle
- 1985 - Mrs. Fitzherbet
- 1984 - Special To Me
- 1983 - Kalimna
- 1982 - Lady Ice
- 1981 - Epillette

== See also ==
- Alexandra Stakes (MVRC)
- Alister Clark Stakes
- Typhoon Tracy Stakes
- William Reid Stakes
- List of Australian Group races
- Group races
