= Typhoon Tracy Stakes =

- Class: Group 3
- Location: Caulfield Racecourse or Moonee Valley Racecourse, Melbourne, Australia
- Inaugurated: 2011
- Race type: Thoroughbred
- Sponsor: Orbit Logistics (2026)

Race information
- Distance: 1,200 metres
- Surface: Turf
- Track: Left-handed
- Qualification: Three year old fillies
- Weight: Set Weights with penalties
- Purse: $200,000 (2026)

The Typhoon Tracy Stakes, currently known as the Don Casboult Classic, is a Moonee Valley Racing Club Group 3 Australian Thoroughbred horse race for three year old fillies, at set weights with penalties, over a distance of 1200 metres. It is held at Moonee Valley Racecourse in Melbourne, Australia in March.

With Moonee Valley under redevelopment the race was moved to Caulfield in 2026.

== History ==
The race was initially run on a Friday night under lights.

=== Name ===
The registered name of the race comes from the 2009–2010 Australian Racehorse of the Year, Typhoon Tracy, who won the Myer Classic, C F Orr Stakes, Futurity Stakes and Queen Of The Turf Stakes during the season. The mare died while giving birth to her first foal at Vinery Stud in the NSW Hunter Valley in 2012.

From 2024 onwards the race is called the Don Casboult Classic, named after the former Moonee Valley Racing Club chair.

=== Grade ===
- 2011–2013 - Listed Race
- 2014 onwards - Group 3

== Winners ==
The following are past winners of the race.

- 2026 - Point Barrow
- 2025 - Clean Energy
- 2024 - Gumdrops
- 2023 - Parisal
- 2022 - Hellfest
- 2021 - Macroura
- 2020 - Ms Catherine
- 2019 - Embrace Me
- 2018 - Tulip
- 2017 - Brugal Reward
- 2016 - Almighty Girl
- 2015 - Written Dash
- 2014 - Jazz Song
- 2013 - Norzita
- 2012 - Glows
- 2011 - Miss Gai Flyer

== See also ==
- Alexandra Stakes (MVRC)
- Alister Clark Stakes
- Sunline Stakes
- William Reid Stakes
- List of Australian Group races
- Group races
