= Comic Court =

Australian Thoroughbred racehorse

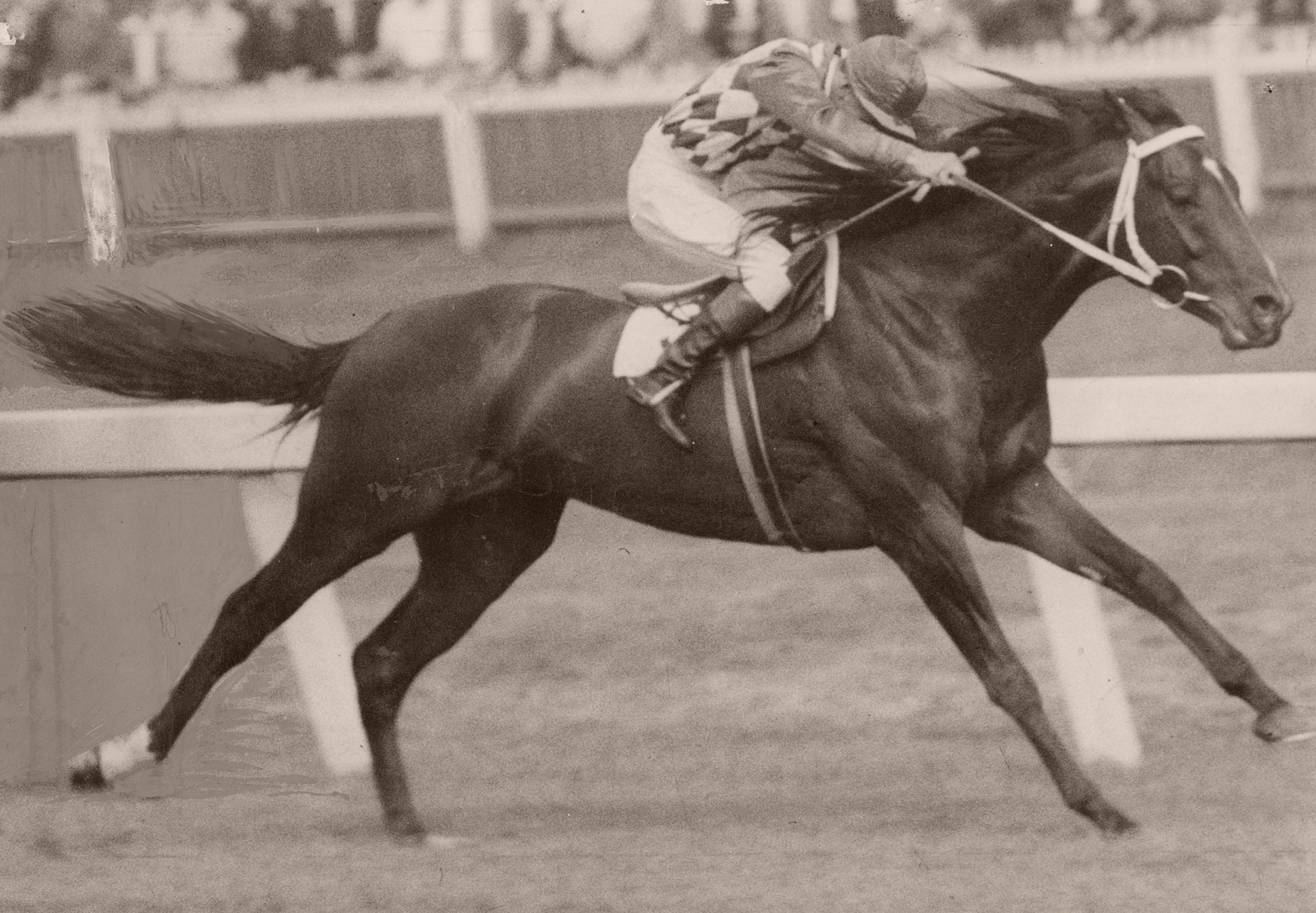
- Sire: Powerscourt
- Grandsire: The Night Patrol (GB)
- Dam: Witty Maid
- Damsire: Anton King
- Sex: Stallion
- Foaled: 1945
- Country: Australia
- Colour: Bay or brown
- Breeder: H. & M. Bowyer
- Owner: H.W. Bowyer, and then R. A., J.C. and A.J. Lee
- Trainer: Jim Cummings
- Record: 54: 28-11-3½
- Earnings: £48,579 (A$97,158)

Major wins
- Ascot Vale Stakes (1948); VRC Derby (1948); VRC St Leger Stakes (1949); Memsie Stakes (1949, 1950); Craiglee Stakes (1949); Turnbull Stakes (1949, 1950); LKS Mackinnon Stakes (1949, 1950); St George Stakes (1950, 1951); Alister Clark Stakes (1950); Caulfield Stakes (1950); Melbourne Cup (1950); William Reid Stakes (1951); C F Orr Stakes (1951); Chipping Norton Stakes (1951)

Honours
- Australian Racing Hall of Fame
- Last updated on 26 May 2010

Comic Court (1945–1973) was a most versatile post-war Australian bred Thoroughbred racehorse who set race records at distances of 6 furlongs (1,200 metres) and 2 miles (3,200 metres). He won the 1950 Melbourne Cup carrying 9 stone 5 pounds (59 kg) and set an Australasian record of 3 minutes 19½ seconds.

== Breeding ==
He was bred by the Bowyer brothers at their Beau Neire Stud, Normanville, South Australia. Comic Court was by Powerscourt (won Ascot Vale Stakes and sire of 12 stakes-winners for 51 stakes-wins), his dam, Witty Maid was by Anton King.

Powerscourt and Witty Maid were both sold by Jim M. Cummings for total of £150 during World War II, when racing was cancelled in Adelaide. Witty Maid was a handy race-mare and was an outstanding broodmare that produced five siblings to Comic Court. Her stakes-winners were:

- Comedy Prince (1944, top sprinter, won 20 races including, Cantala Stakes, STC Railway Quality Handicap, Adelaide RC Adelaide Guineas, South Australia JC SA Stakes, SAJC Sires' Produce Stakes, AJC The Shorts, William Reid Stakes);
- Gay Comedy (1948, won 10 races including SAJC Oaks, SAJC St. Leger Stakes, SAJC Auraria Stakes), and
- St. Comedy (1946, won 22 races including ARC Adelaide Guineas, SAJC Goodwood Handicap, Moonee Valley Stakes, Ascot Vale (2yo) Stakes, VATC Debutant Stakes, PARC John Lewis Stakes, Adelaide RC Fulham Park Plate)

=== 1950 and 1951 racebooks ===
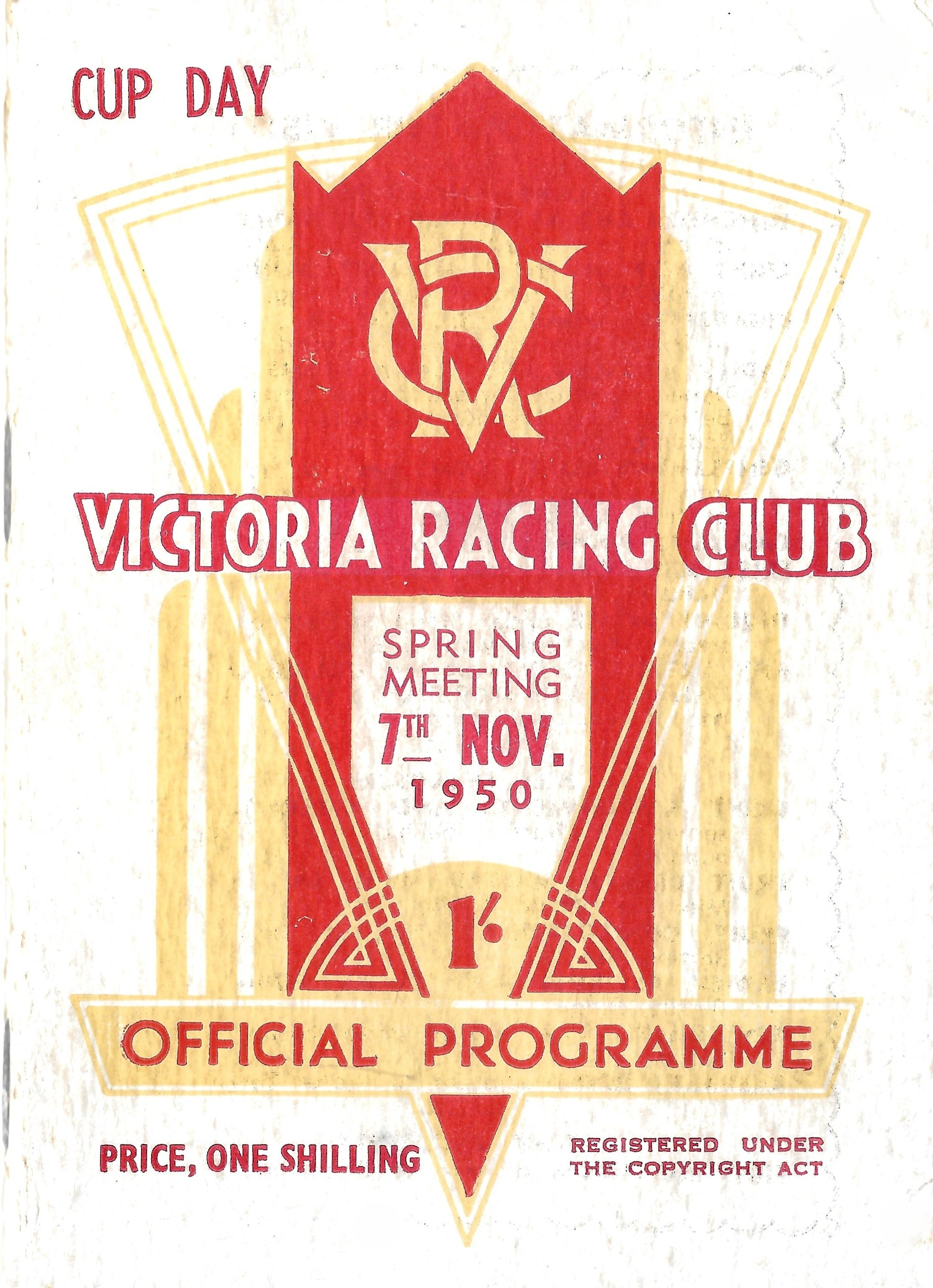
1950 VRC Melbourne Cup racebook front cover

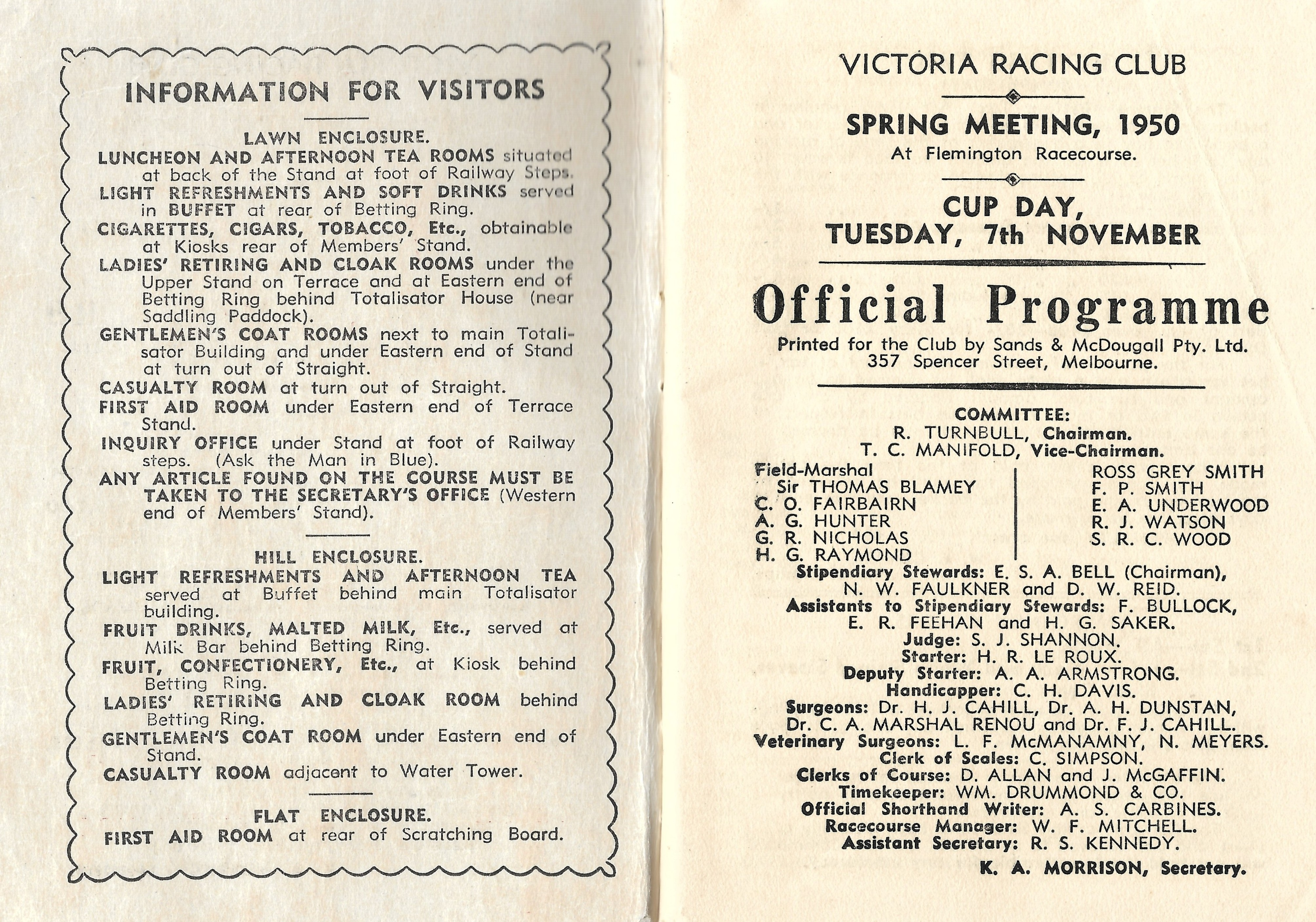
1950 VRC Melbourne Cup showing raceday officials

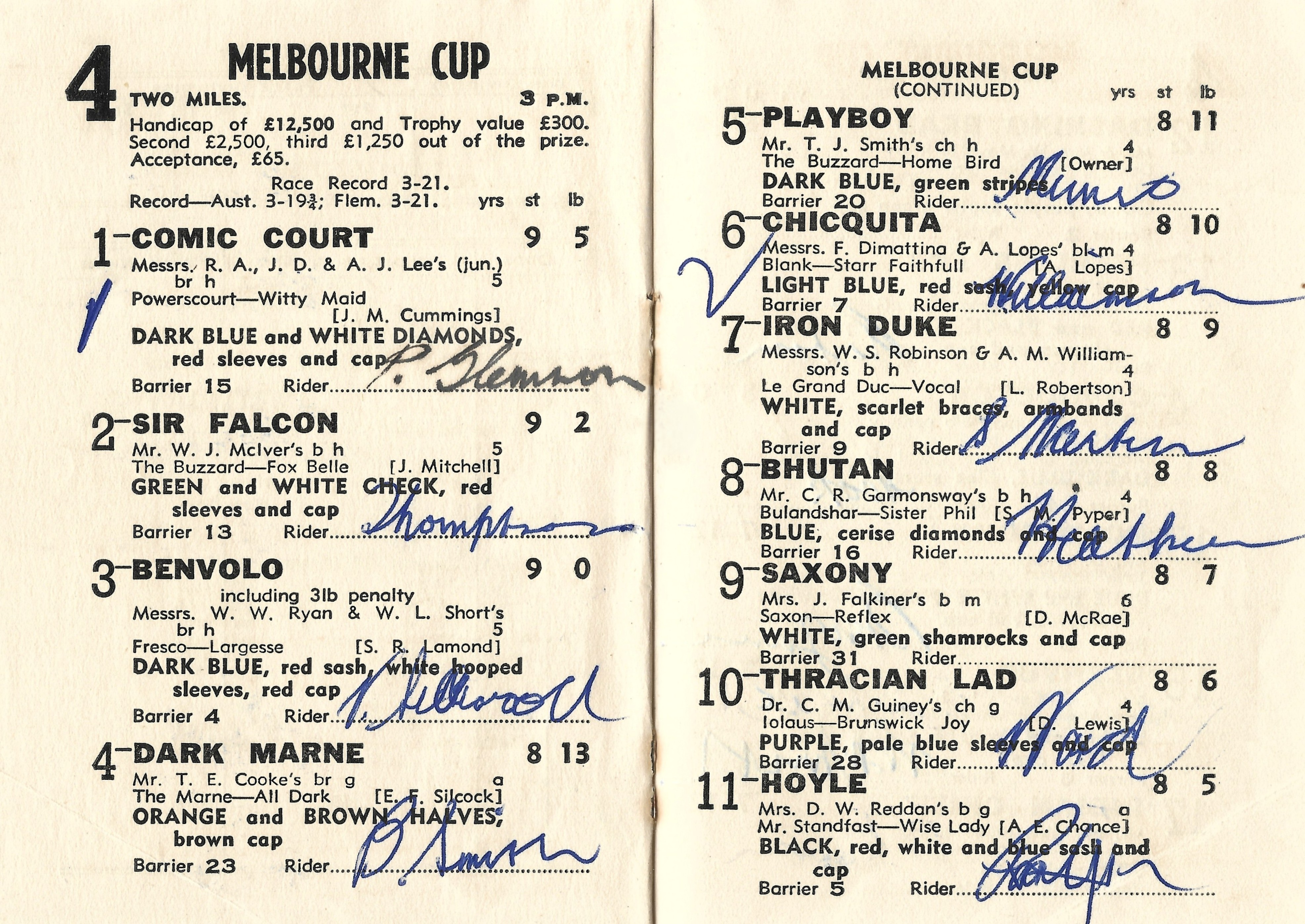
1950 VRC Melbourne Cup showing the winner, Comic Court

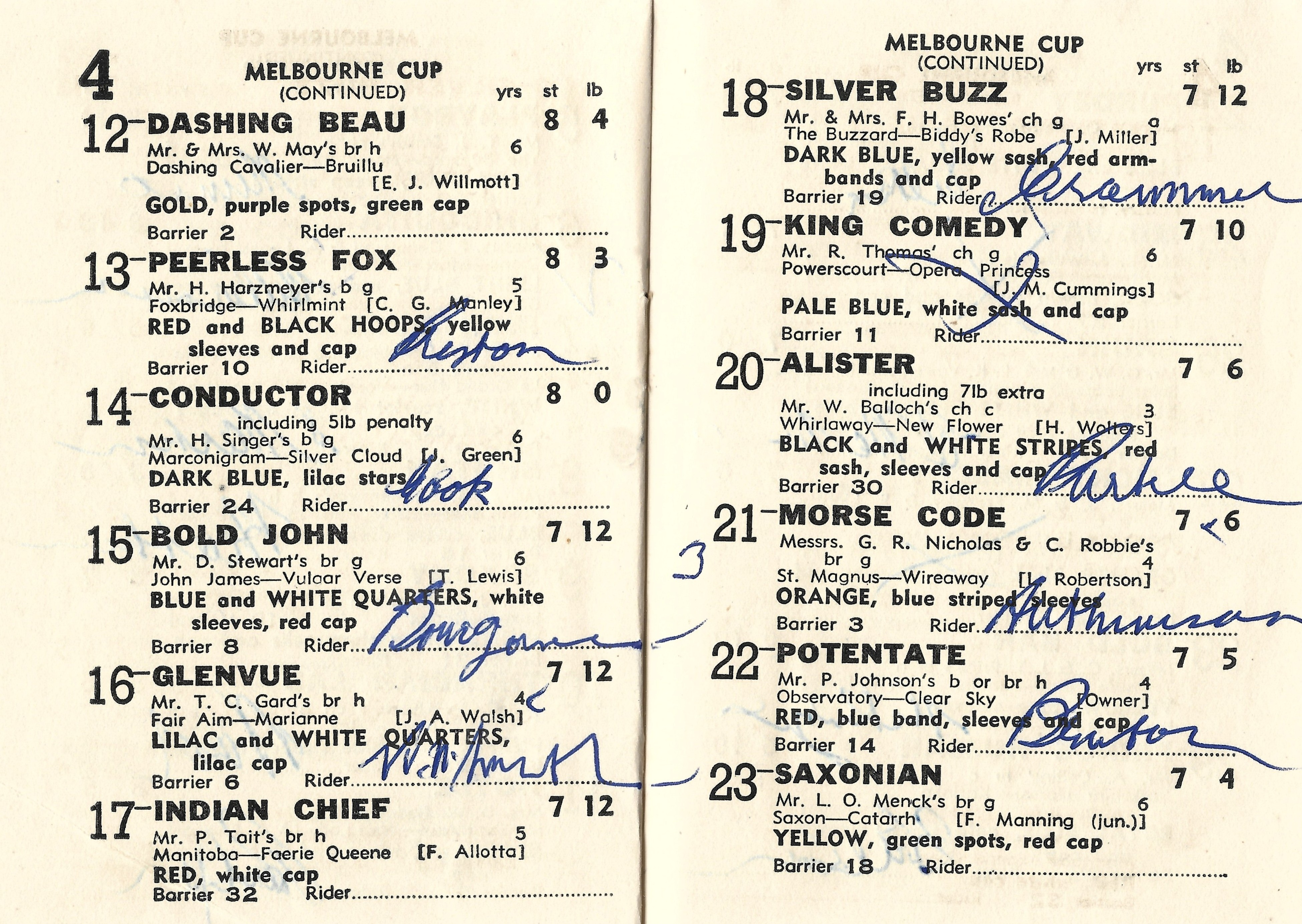
1950 VRC Melbourne Cup racebook starters and results

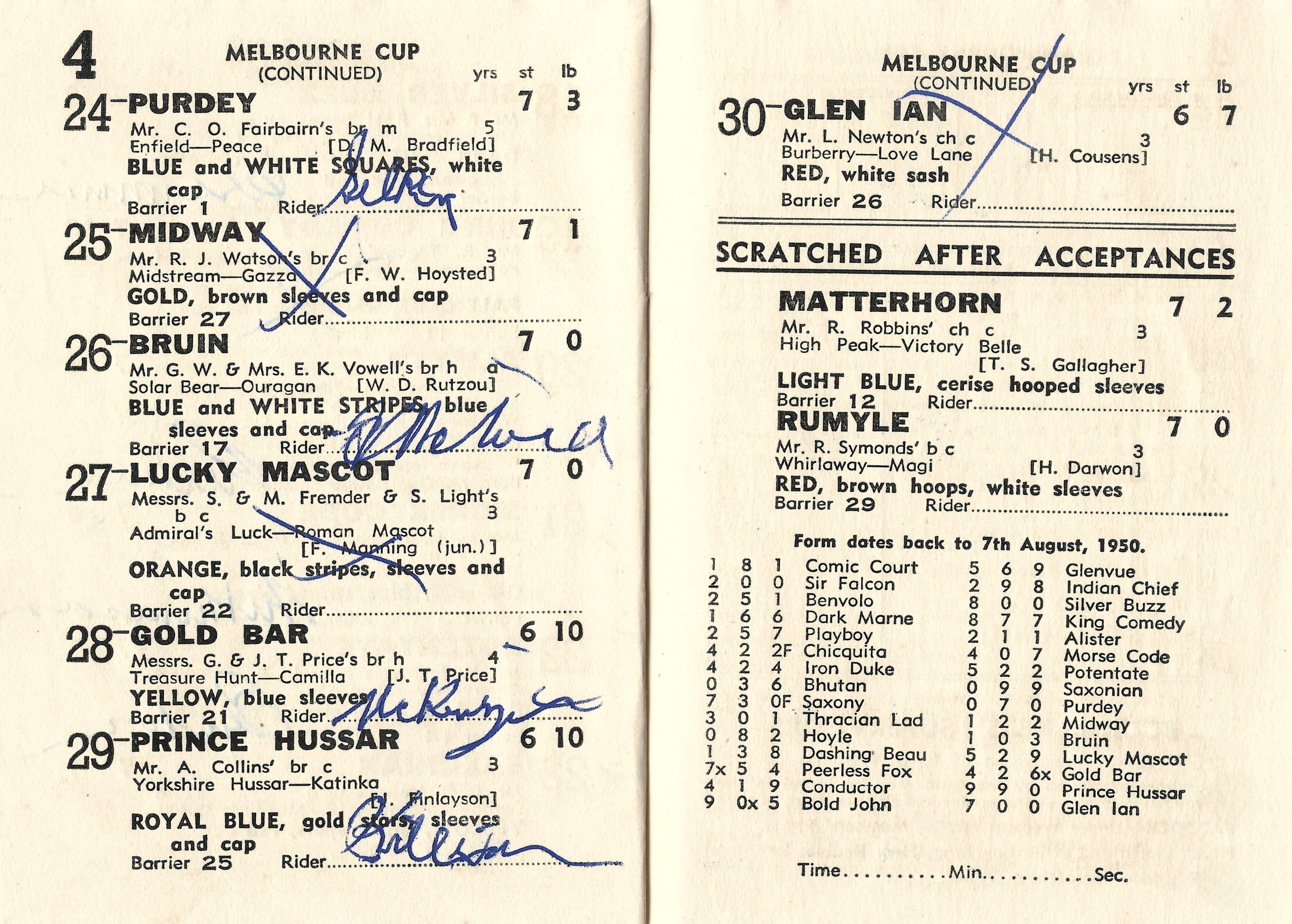
1950 VRC Melbourne Cup racebook starters and results

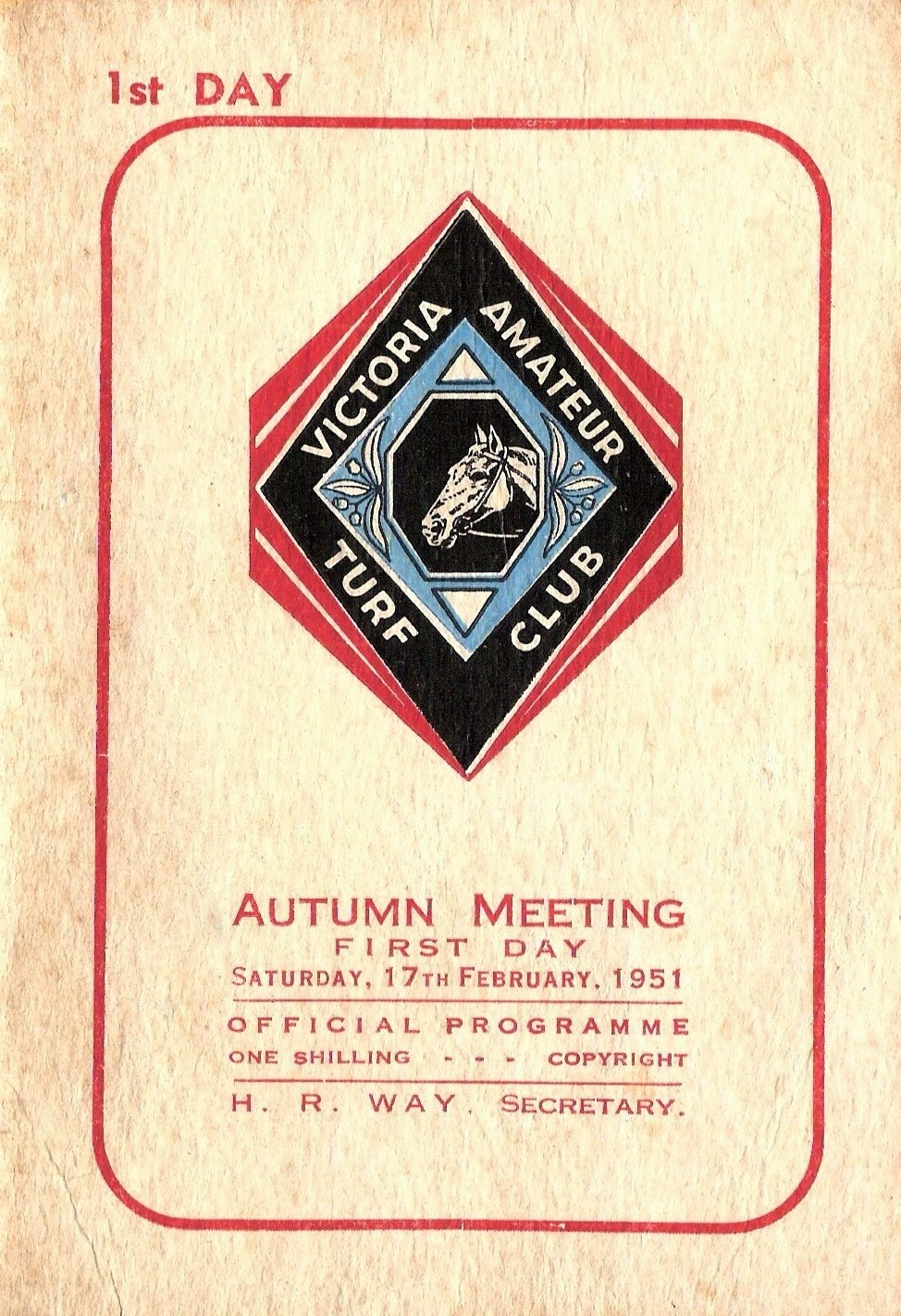
1951 St George Stakes racebook front cover

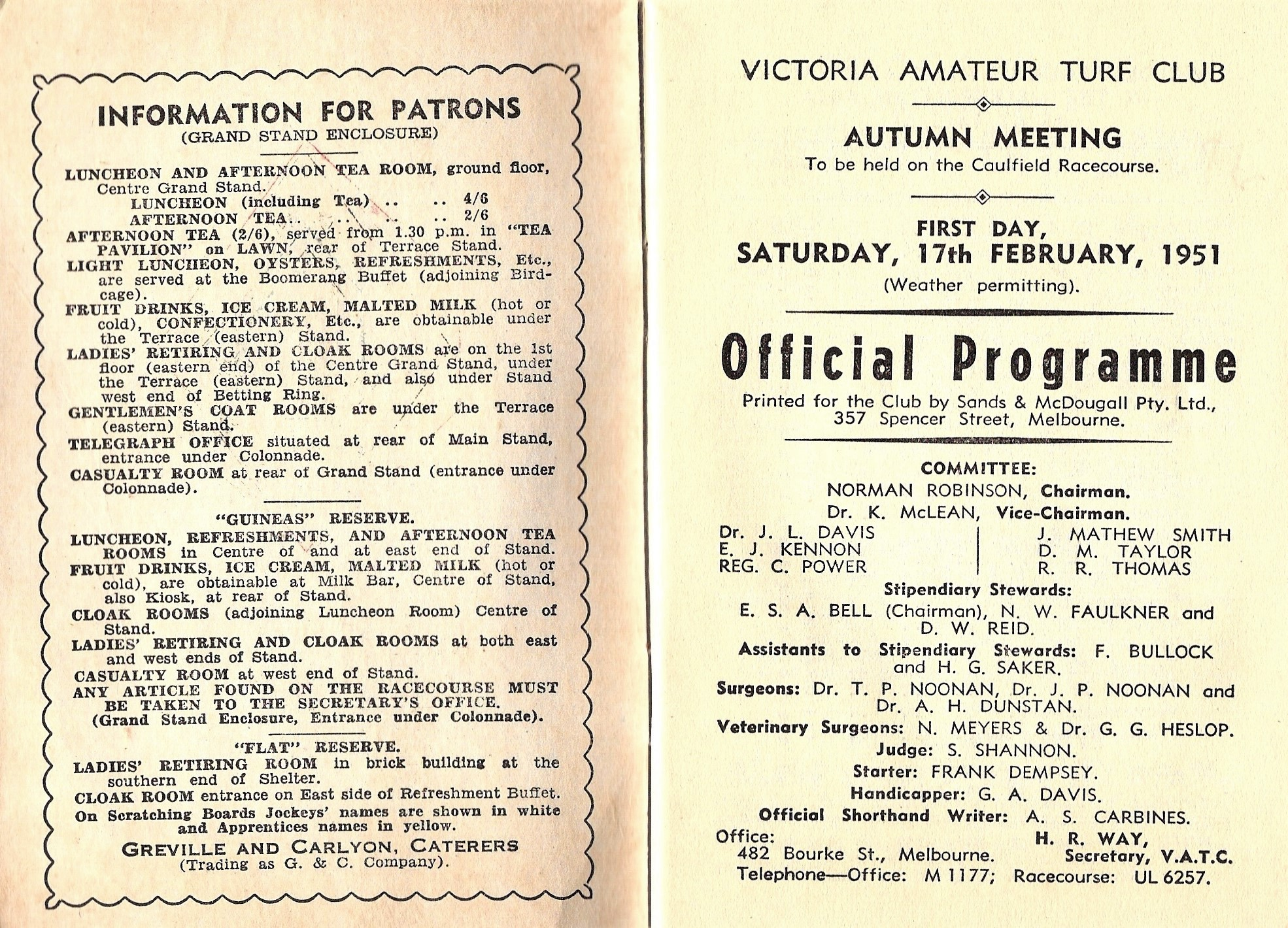
1951 St George Stakes showing raceday officials

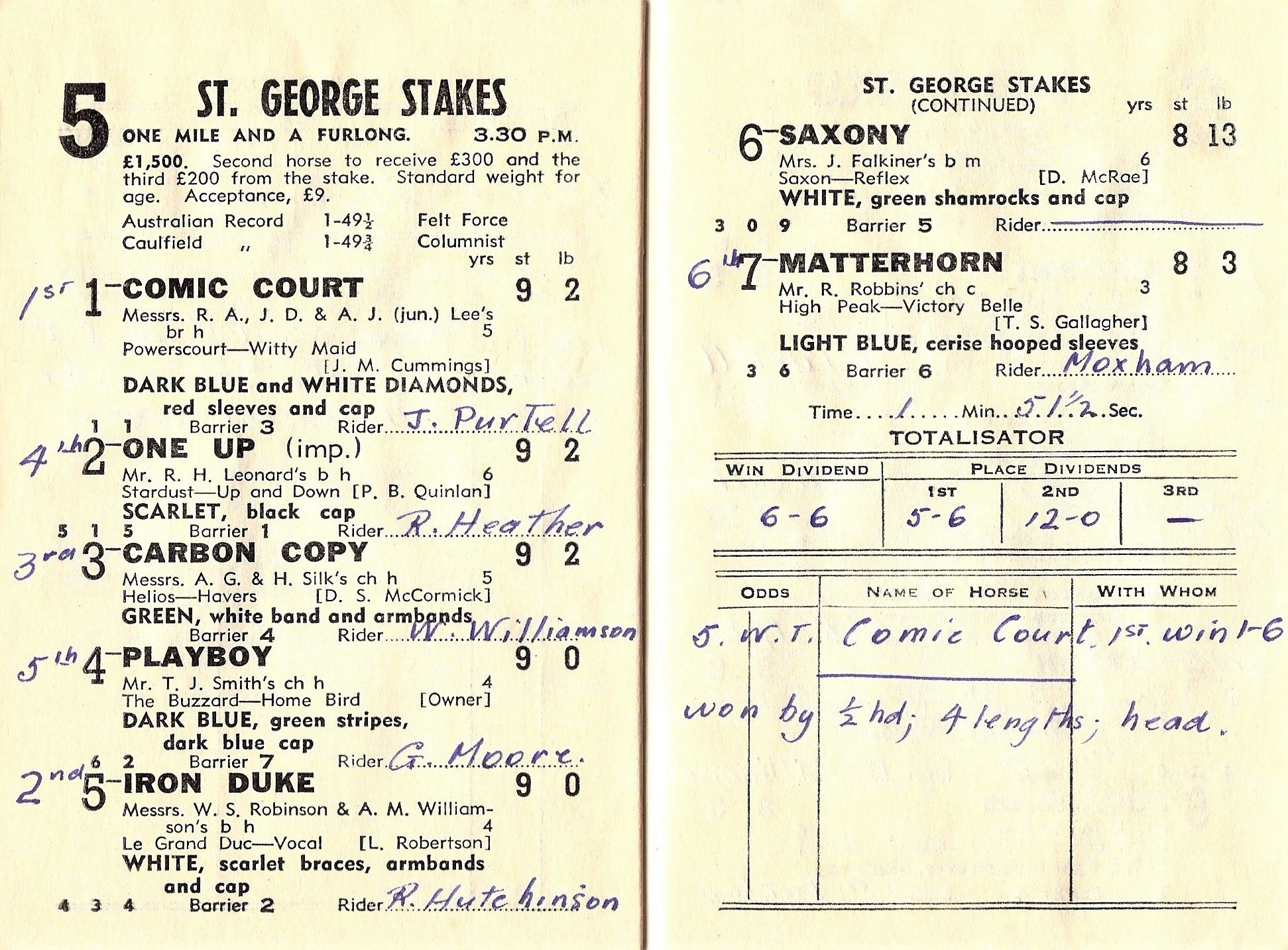
1951 St George Stakes showing the winner, Comic Court

== Racing record ==
He was trained by Jim M. Cummings and his son, Bart Cummings, was Comic Court’s strapper.

=== Two-year-old: 1947-1948 ===
Comic Court had eight starts for five wins including the Adelaide RC Fulham Park Plate, PARC Sires’ Produce Stakes and VRC Ascot Vale (2yo) Stakes plus three second places. His first start was in the Fulham Park Plate after which Comic Court was sold for 2,300 guineas to R. A., J.D. and A.J. Lee before winning four more starts as a 2yo.

=== Three-year-old: 1948-1949 ===
Comic Court had 16 starts for 5 wins including the VRC Derby, Memsie Stakes, VRC St Leger Stakes plus 2 second places.

=== Four-year-old: 1949-1950 ===
Comic Court had 14 starts for 8 wins including the Memsie Stakes, VRC Craiglee Stakes, VRC Turnbull Stakes, LKS Mackinnon Stakes, VATC St George Stakes, VRC Ercildoune Stakes and MVRC Alister Clark Stakes. He also ran second in the W.S. Cox Plate, William Reid Stakes and CF Orr Stakes as well as running third in the Caulfield Cup.

=== Five-year-old: 1950-1951 ===
Comic Court had 16 starts for 10 stakes wins including the VATC Caulfield Stakes, VATC Memsie Stakes, L.K.S Mackinnon Stakes, Melbourne Cup, VRC Turnbull Stakes, AJC Chipping Norton Stakes, MRC CF Orr Stakes, MVRC William Reid Stakes, VATC St George Stakes and VRC Ercildoune Stakes. Additionally he ran second in another three stakes races and was third twice including the Sydney Cup. He won the 1950 Melbourne Cup carrying 9 stone 5 pounds (59 kg) by three lengths, with the third placegetter a further length away and he set an Australasian record time of 3 minutes 19½ seconds.

== Stud record ==
Comic Court was retired to stud in 1951 at E.A. Underwood’s Warlaby Stud. His progeny included:

- Asian Court, won Werribee Cup
- Comicquita, second in the 1962 Melbourne Cup.
- Droll Prince, won VRC Cantala Stakes and Williamstown Cup
- Gurney, won MRC International Stakes
- Harcourt, won Tatt's SA Tattersall's Cup

Comic Court was inducted into the Australian Racing Hall of Fame in 2009.
