= Champions Stakes =

Horse race in Melbourne, Australia

Champions Stakes (VRC) registered as the LKS Mackinnon Stakes
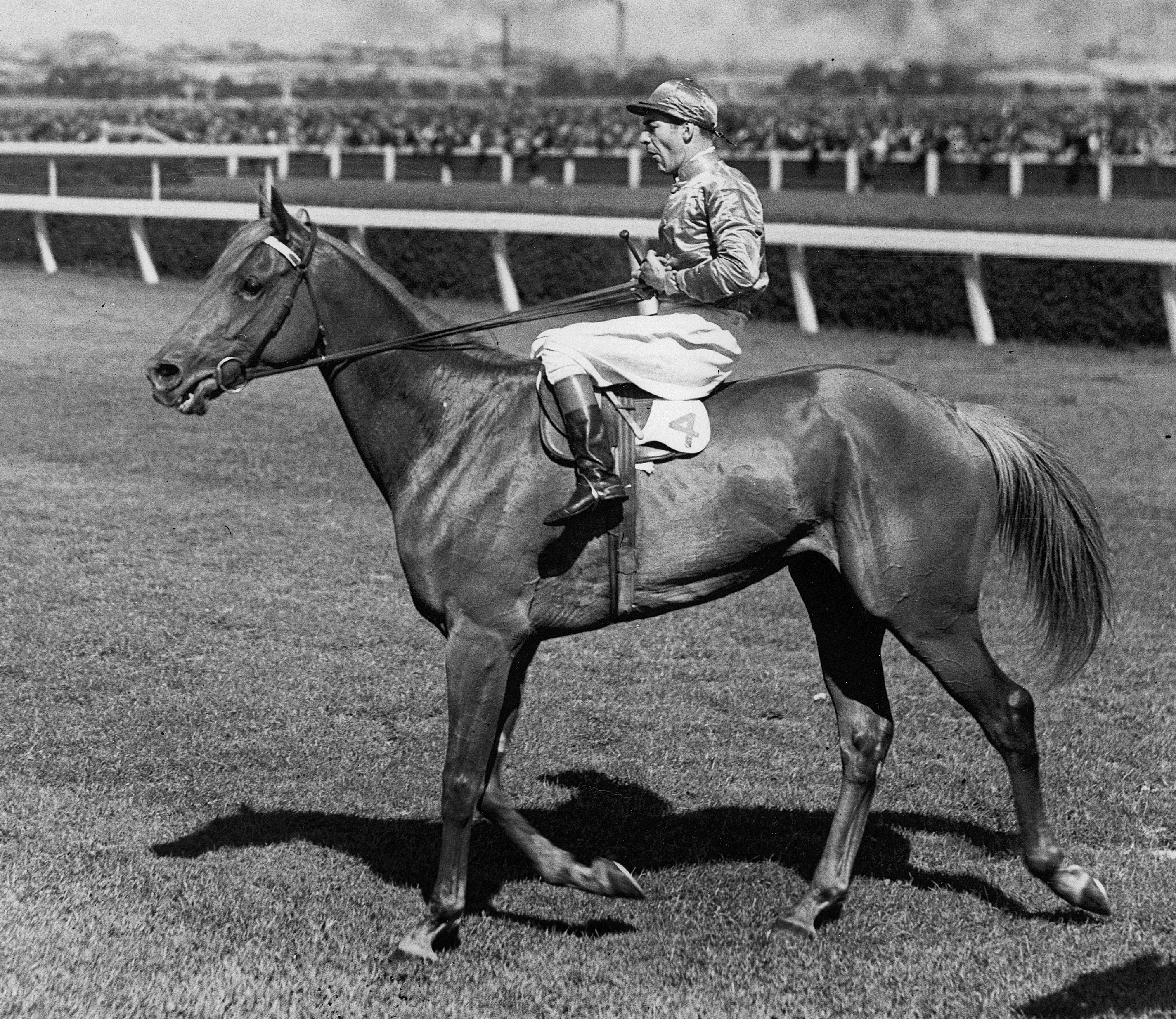
- 1932 and 1934 winner – Peter Pan
- Class: Group 1
- Location: Flemington Racecourse, Melbourne, Australia
- Inaugurated: 1869; 157 years ago (as Melbourne Stakes)
- Race type: Thoroughbred
- Sponsor: TAB (2022-2026)

Race information
- Distance: 2,000 metres
- Surface: Turf
- Qualification: Three year olds and older that are not maidens
- Weight: Weight for Age
- Purse: $3,000,000 (2026)

The VRC Champions Stakes, registered as the LKS Mackinnon Stakes, is a Victoria Racing Club Group 1 Thoroughbred horse race run under Weight for Age conditions over a distance of 2000 metres at Flemington Racecourse in Melbourne, Australia, on the last day of the Melbourne Cup Carnival, the Saturday after the Melbourne Cup.

== History ==
The race is named after a former chairman of the Victoria Racing Club, Lauchlan Kenneth Scobie ("L.K.S.") MacKinnon (1861–1935). It was originally held on the first day of the Melbourne Cup Carnival, Victoria Derby Day. In 2016, the VRC moved the race as the feature of the last day of the carnival, and moved the Cantala Stakes (the then feature of the last day of the carnival and at the time known as the Emirates Stakes) to the first day of the carnival. After the swap, the race would be known as simply the Emirates Stakes until 2017.

Prior to 2016, many horses with a ranking high enough to avoid the ballot for the Melbourne Cup used the race as a lead-in to the 3,200 metre Cup, run on the first Tuesday in November (otherwise they race in the longer Hotham Handicap). The VRC believed that placing the race on the last day of the Melbourne Cup Carnival would attract quality horses, that raced in the W. S. Cox Plate, to run at the distance, rather than using the race to prepare for the Melbourne Cup. In 2022, the race was renamed the VRC Champions Stakes in order to align with the branding of the entire race day, which is now called Champions Day instead of Stakes Day.

The attendance record for the race day was set in 2011, with 85,112 in attendance.

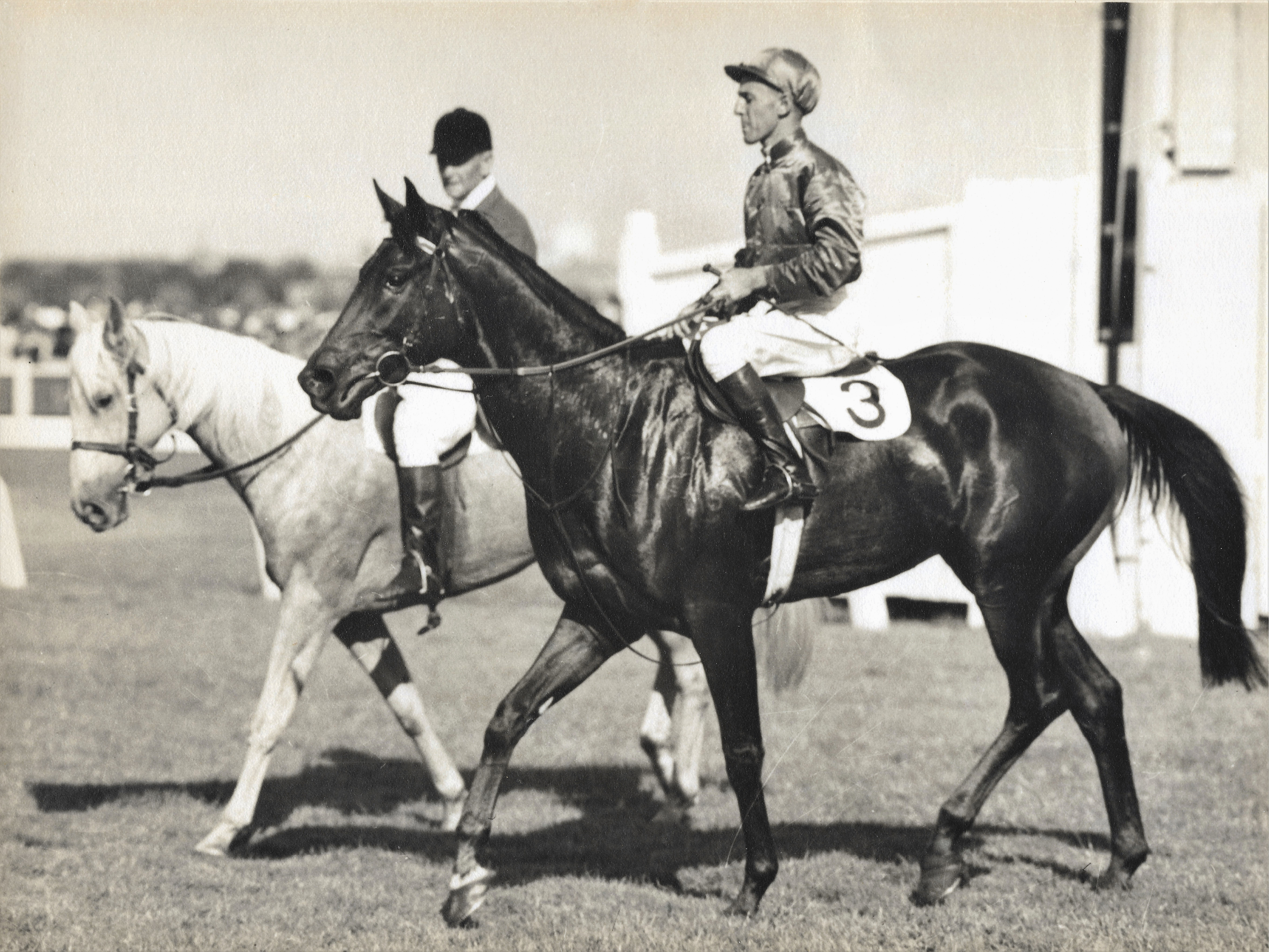
Delta,1951 winner

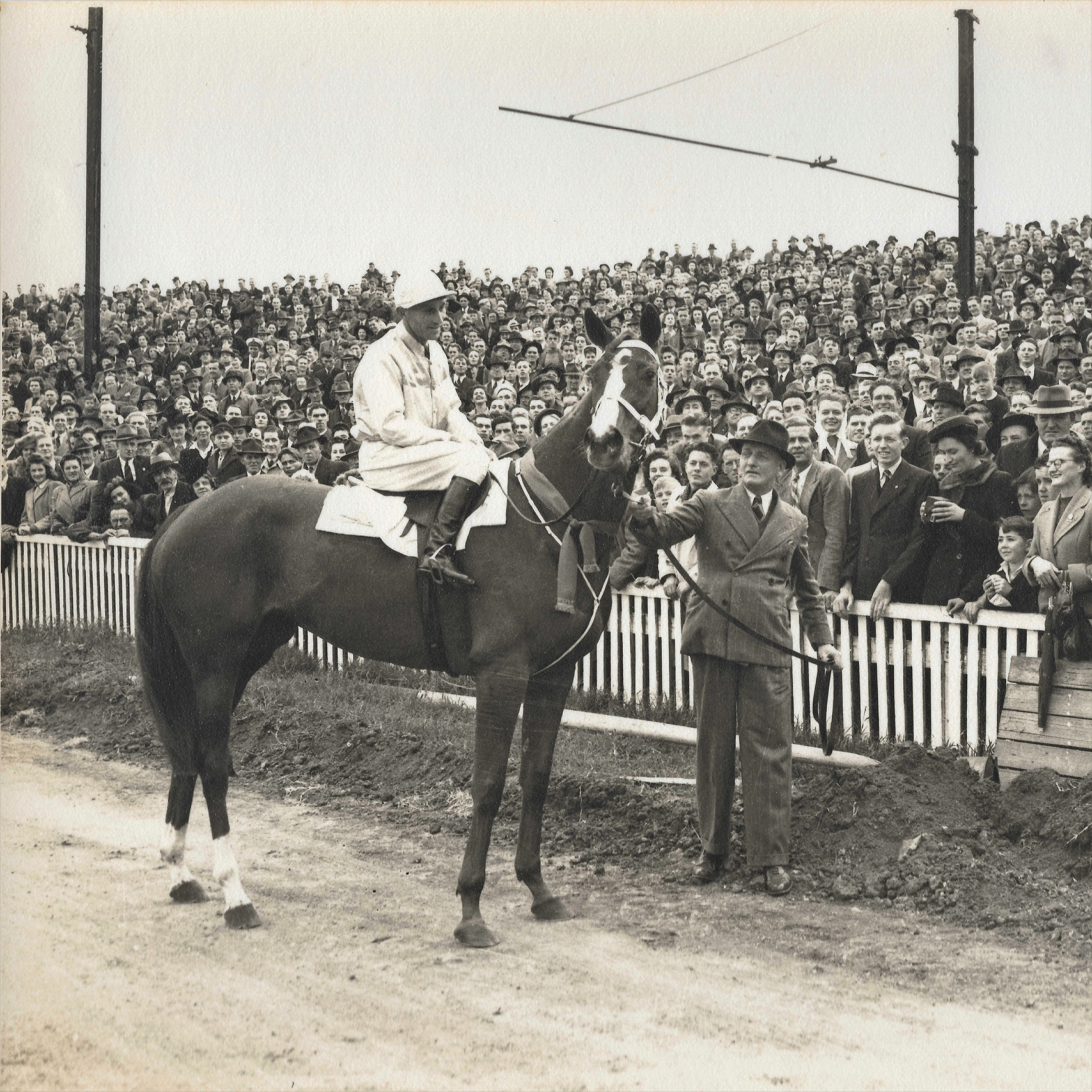
Tranquil Star, 1942, 1944, 1945 winner

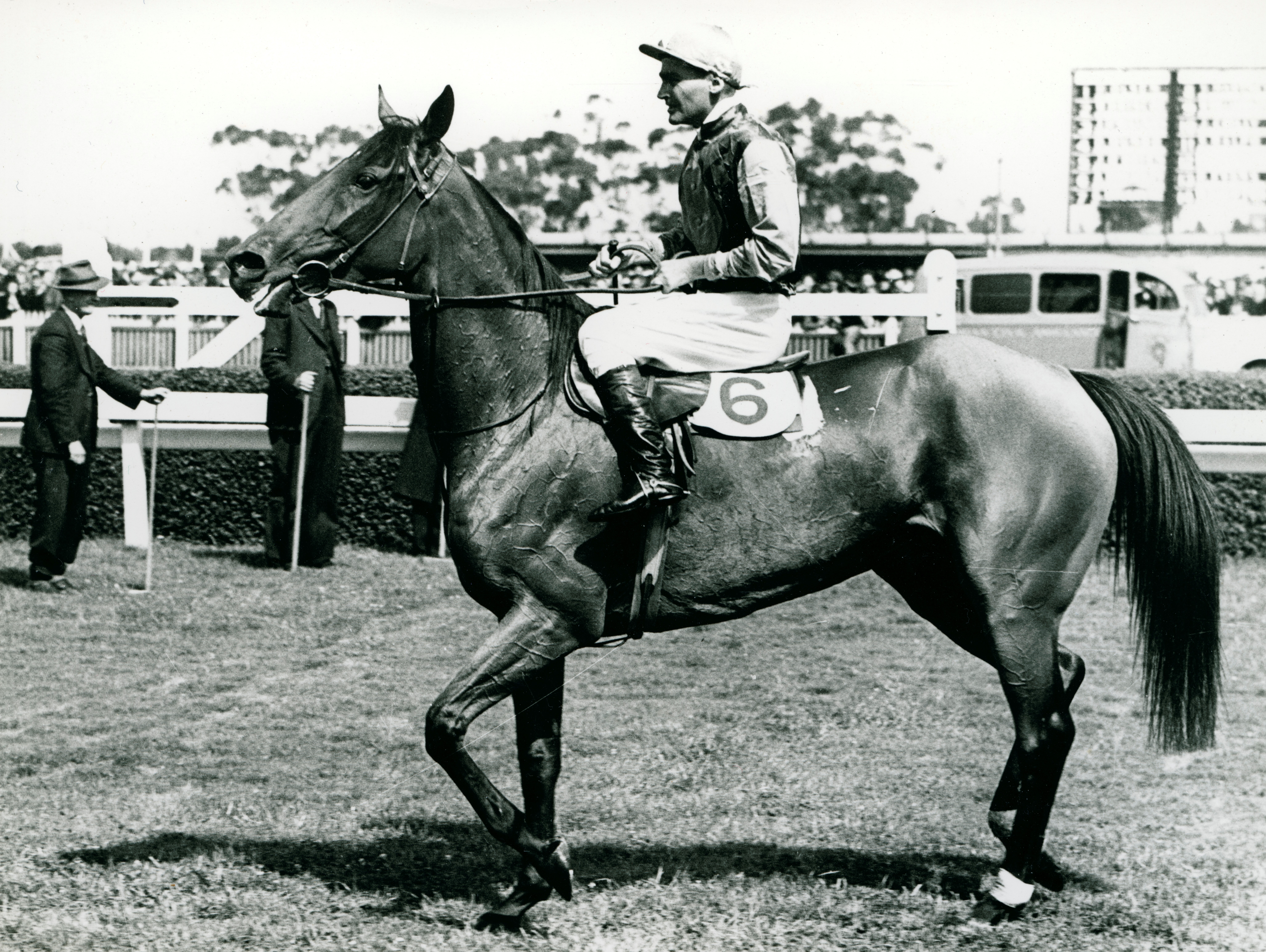
Flight, 1946 winner

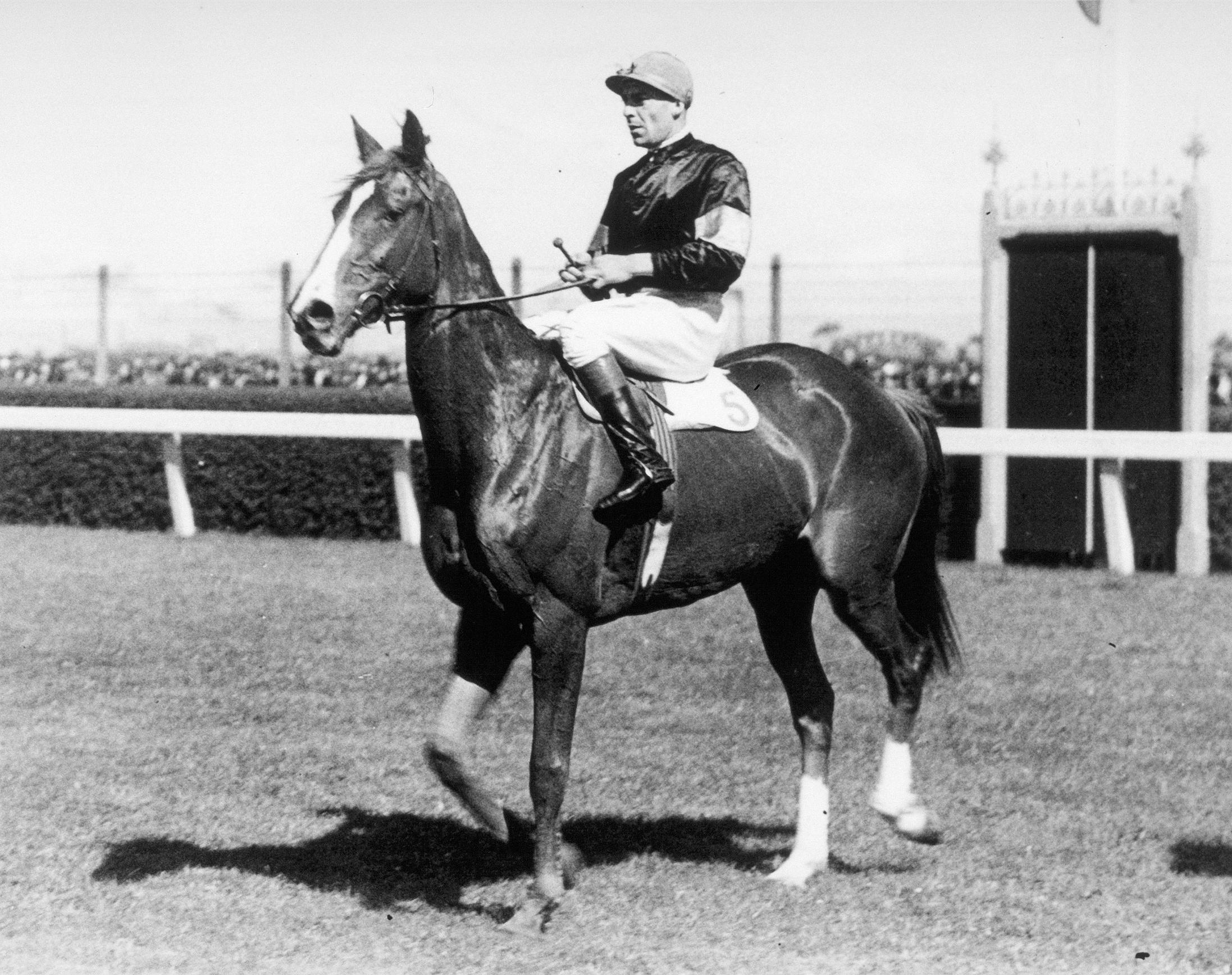
1933 winner – Rogilla; Darby Munro up

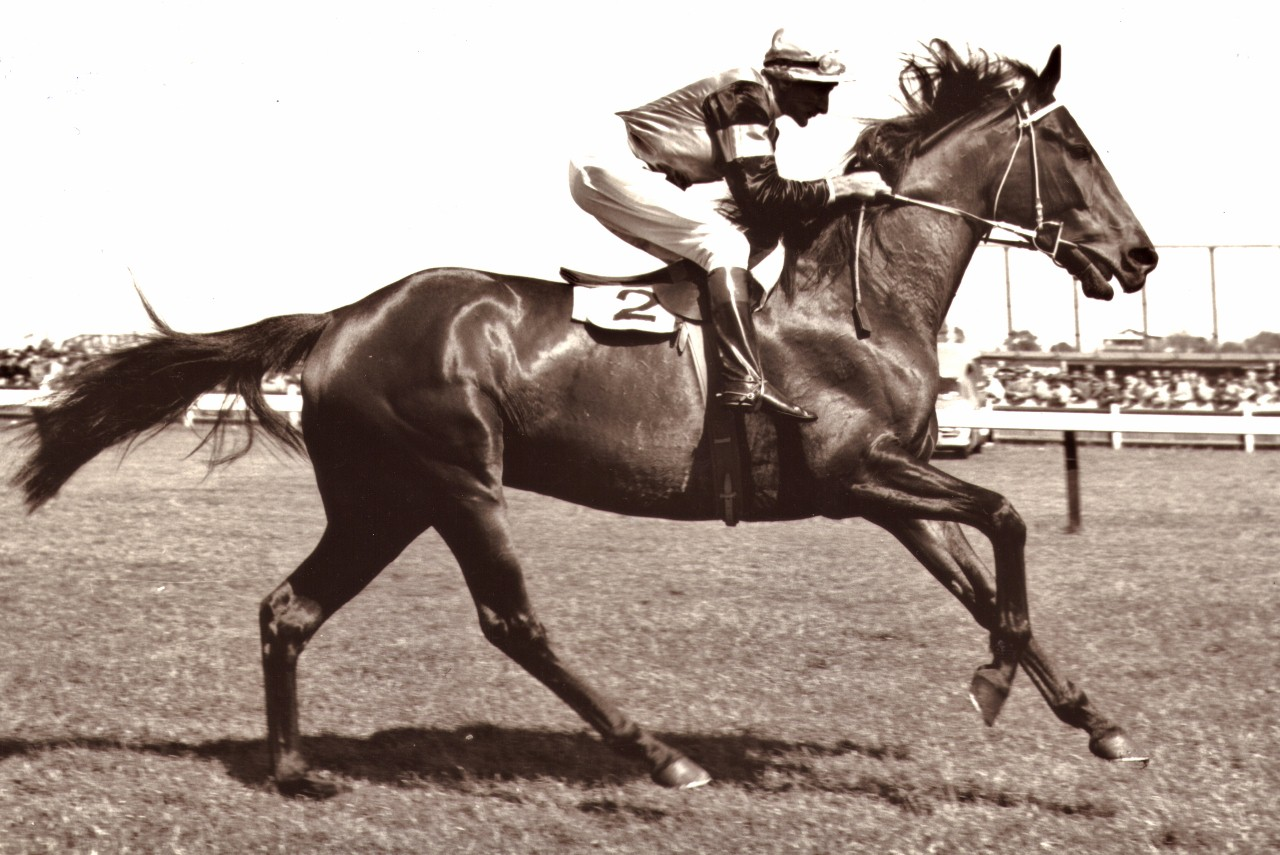
Rising Fast, 1954 & 1955 winner

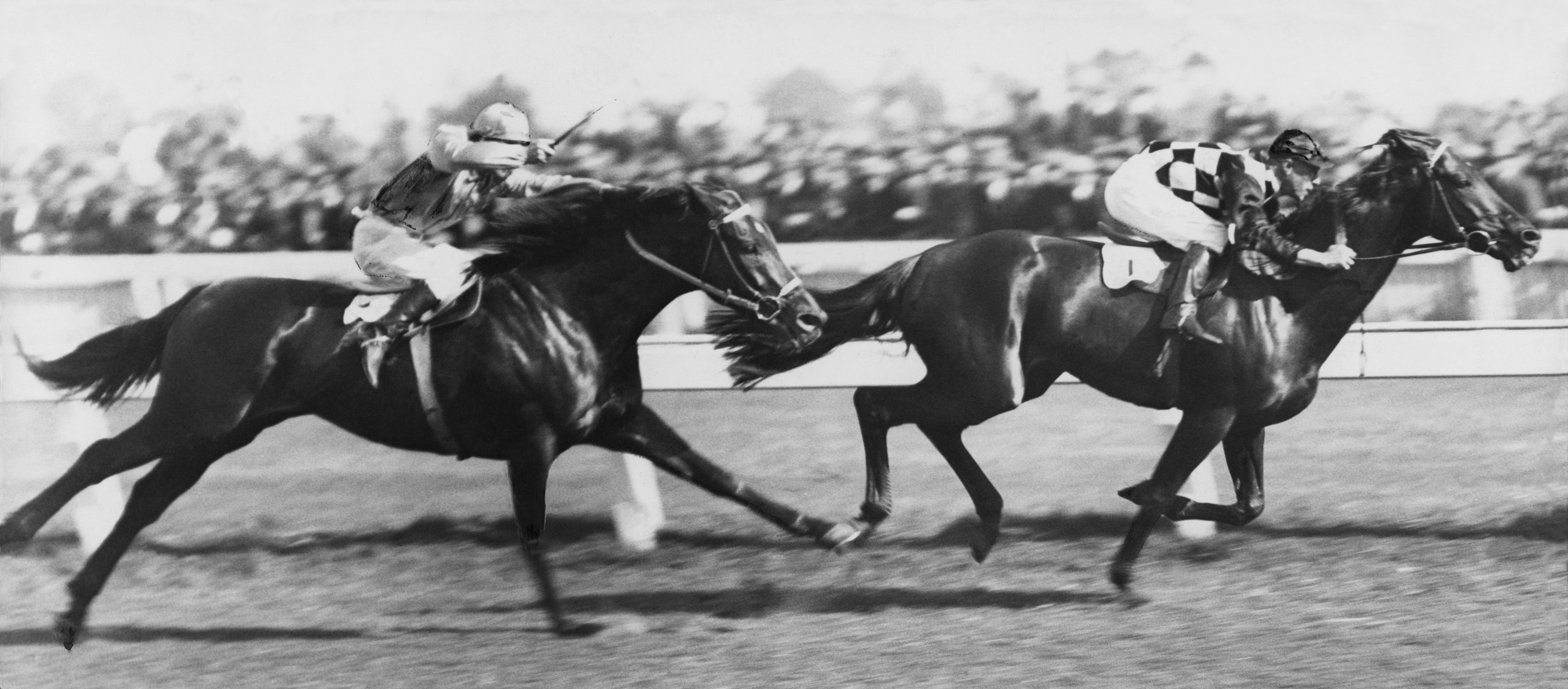
Gothic, 1928 winner

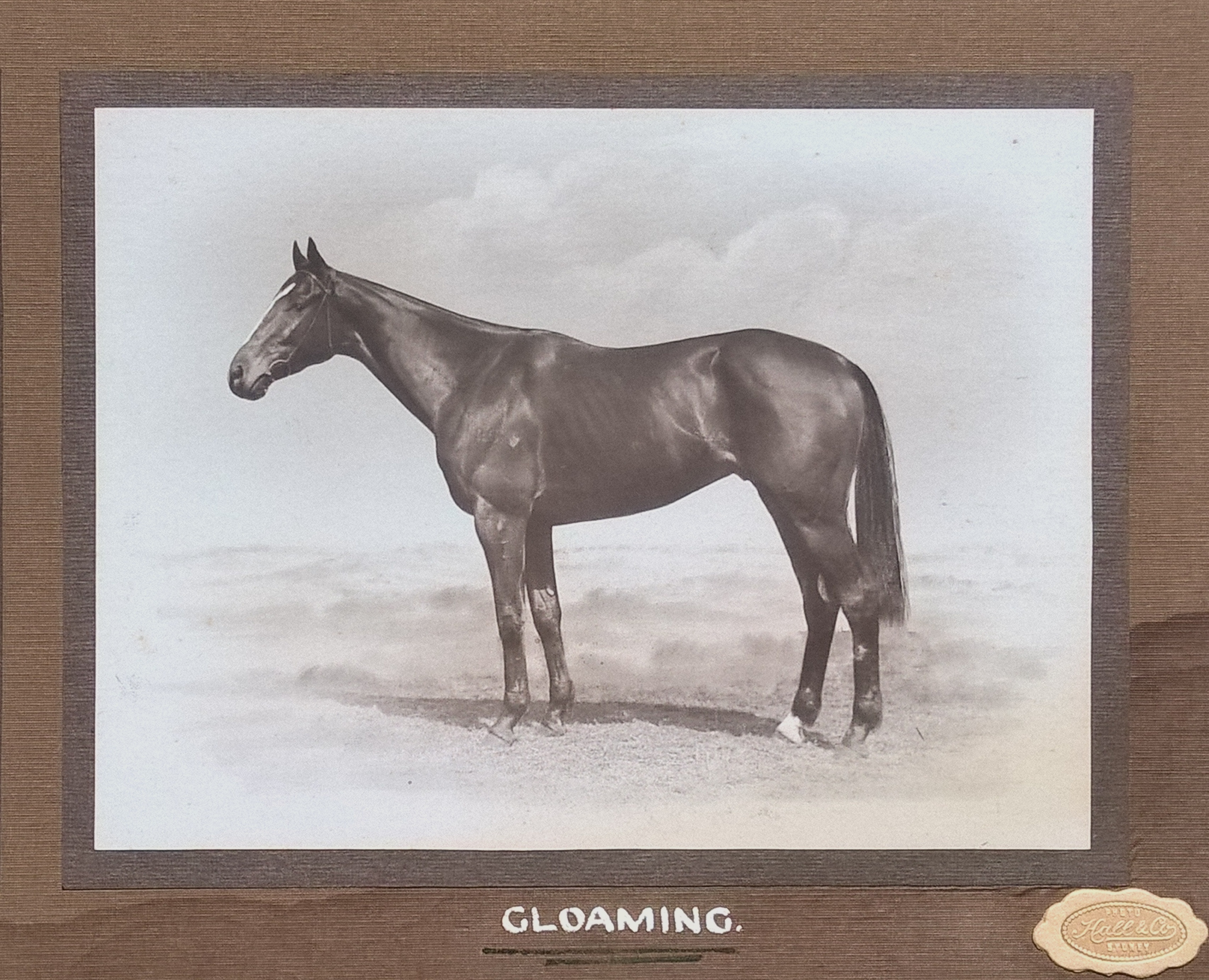
Gloaming, 1924 winner

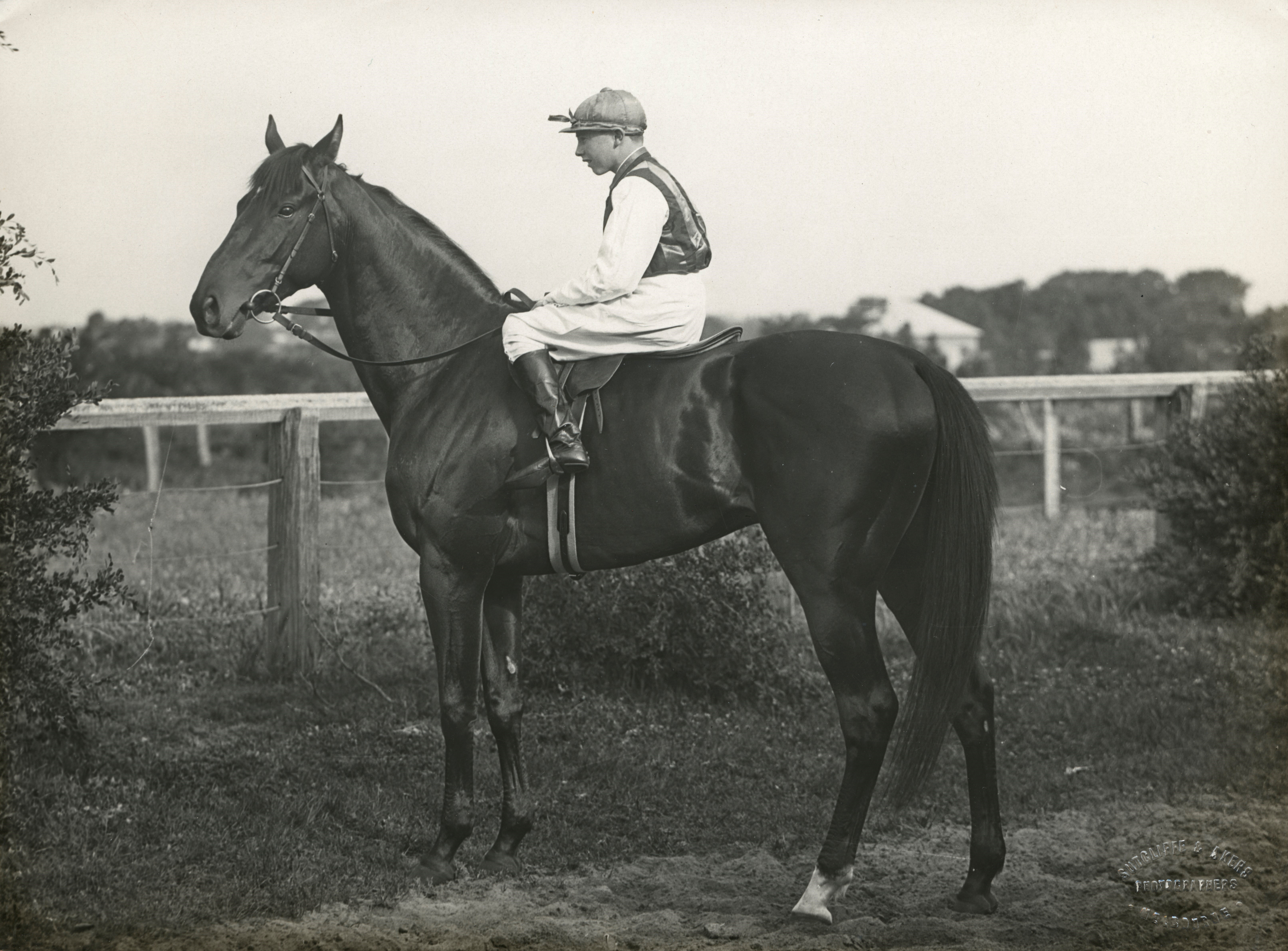
1916 winner – Lavendo

== Name ==
In 1937 the VRC moved the Melbourne Stakes to earlier in the spring, running it in September, over a shorter distance of 1 mile (1.6 km). The race was the predecessor to the Turnbull Stakes.

- 1869–1936 - Melbourne Stakes
- 1937–1986 - LKS Mackinnon Stakes
- 1987–1989 - Occidental Mackinnon Stakes
- 1990 - LKS Mackinnon Stakes
- 1991–2000 - Louis Vuitton Mackinnon Stakes
- 2001–2004 - Thrifty Mackinnon Stakes
- 2005–2006 - Motorola Mackinnon Stakes
- 2007 - L'Oreal Paris Mackinnon Stakes
- 2008 - Crown Mackinnon Stakes
- 2009 - LKS Mackinnon Stakes
- 2010–2015 - Longines Mackinnon Stakes
- 2016–2017 - Emirates Stakes
- 2018–2020 - Seppelt Mackinnon Stakes
- 2021 - Paramount+ Mackinnon Stakes
- 2022 onwards; - TAB Champions Stakes

== Distance ==
- 1869–1971 - 1 1/4 miles (~2000 metres)
- 1972 onwards - 2000 metres

== Grade ==
- 1869–1978 - Principal Race
- 1979 onwards - Group 1

== Doubles wins ==
The following thoroughbreds have won the LKS MacKinnon Stakes – Melbourne Cup in the same year.

- Malua (1884), Carbine (1890), Phar Lap (1930), Peter Pan (1932, 1934), The Trump (1937), Comic Court (1950), Delta (1951), Dalray (1952), Rising Fast (1954), Rain Lover (1968), At Talaq (1986), Empire Rose (1988), Let's Elope (1991), Rogan Josh (1999)

== 1944 and 1946 racebooks ==
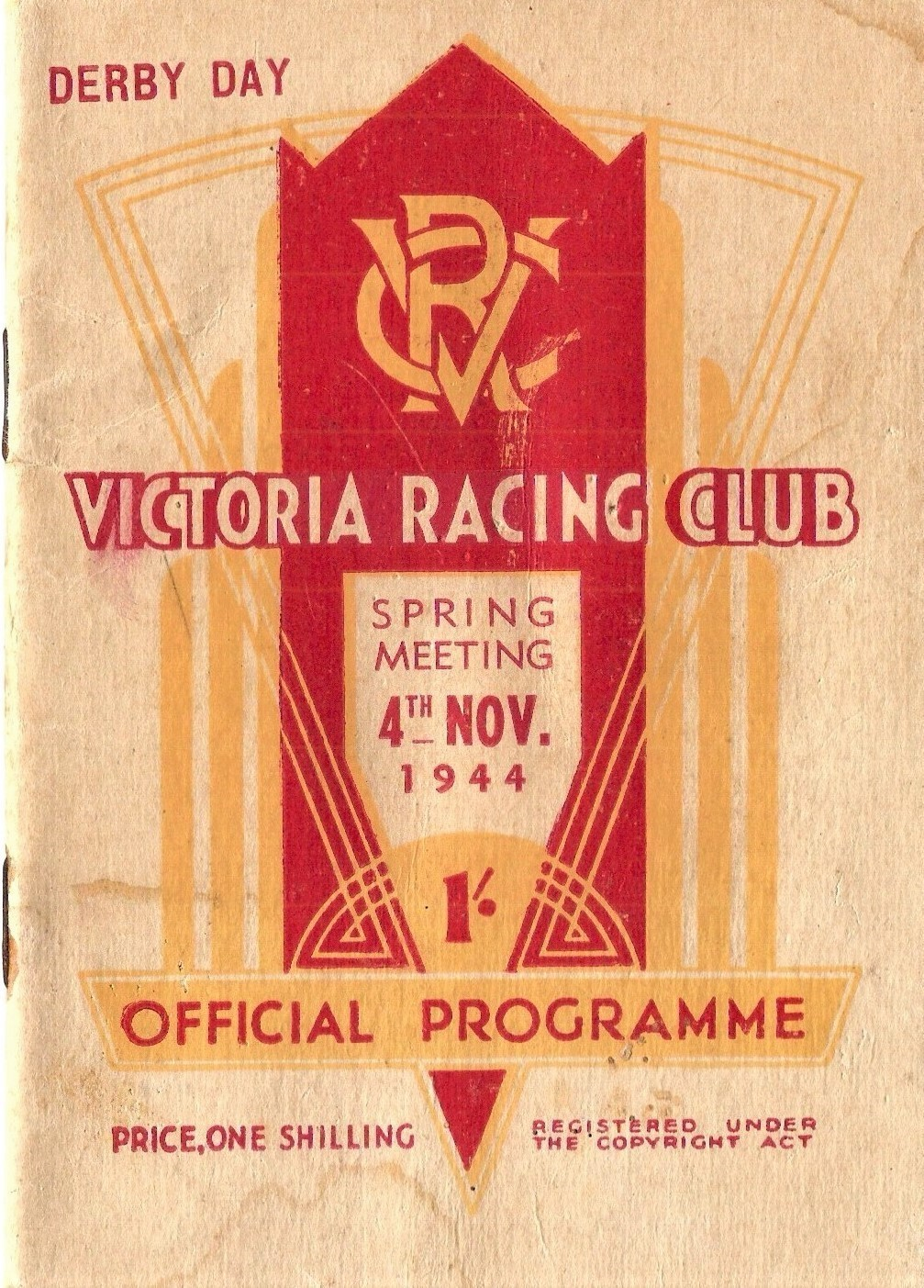
1944 VRC L.K.S. Mackinnon Stakes front cover

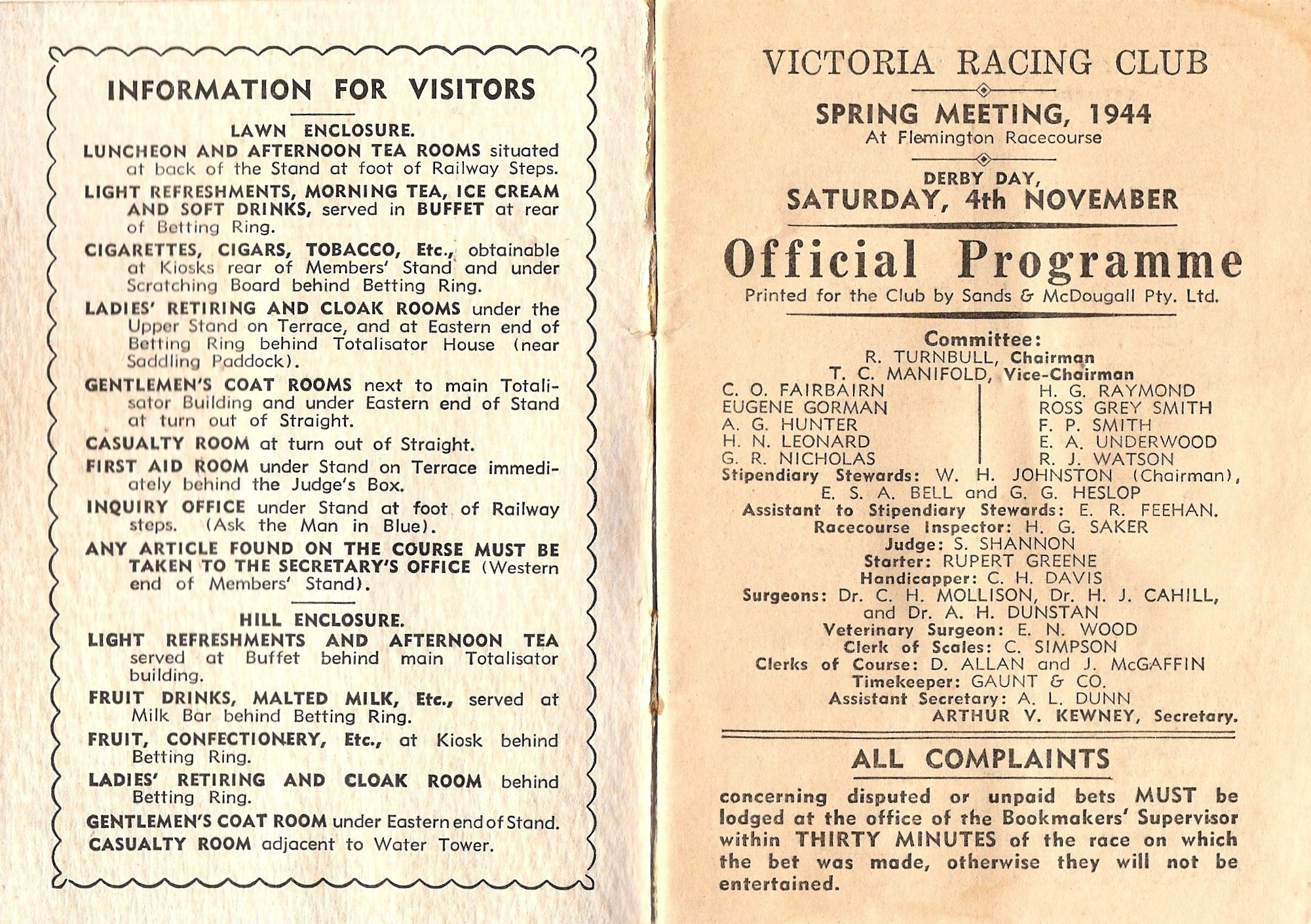
1944 VRC L.K.S. Mackinnon Stakes raceday officials

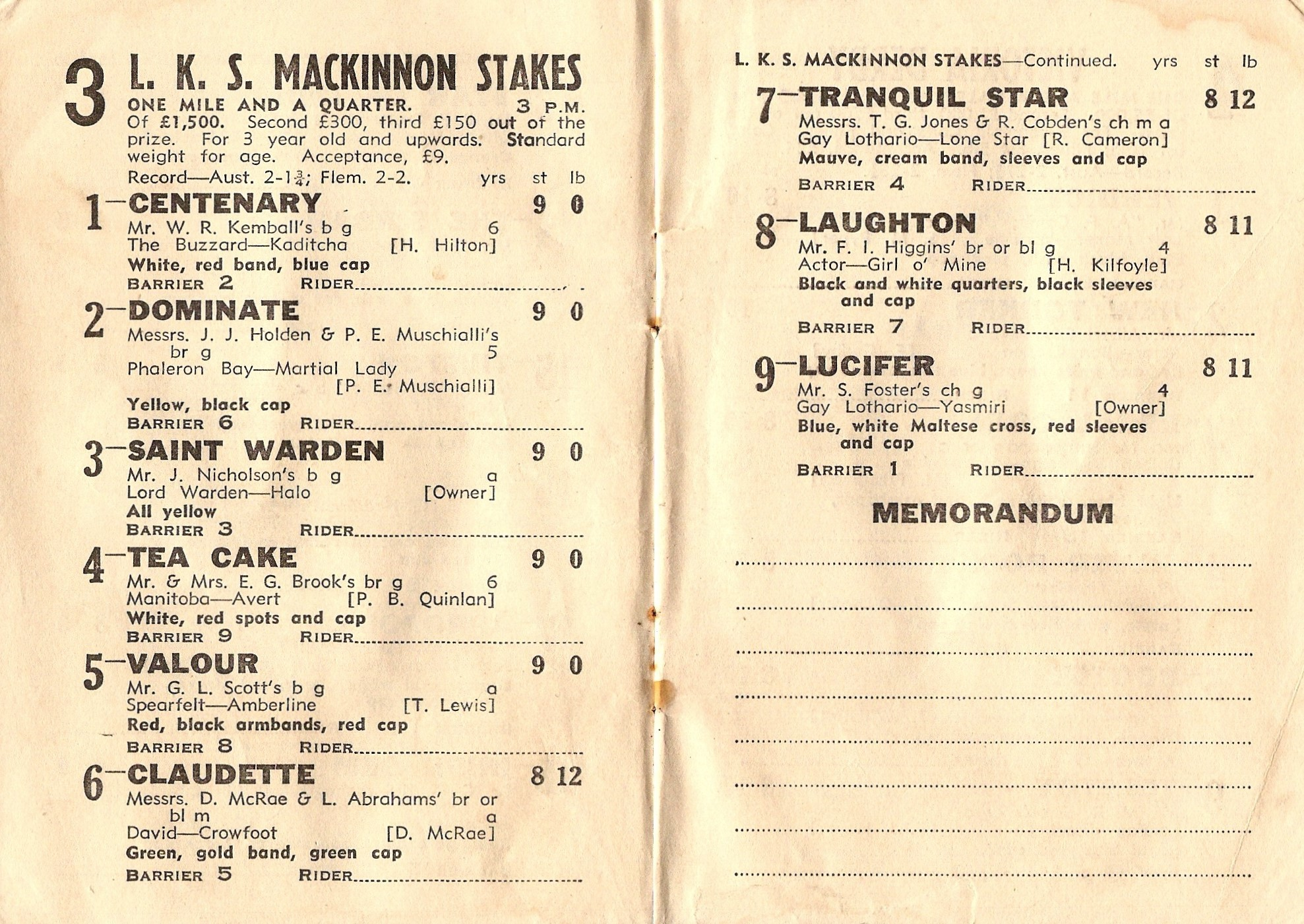
1944 VRC L.K.S. Mackinnon Stakes page and winner,Tranquil Star

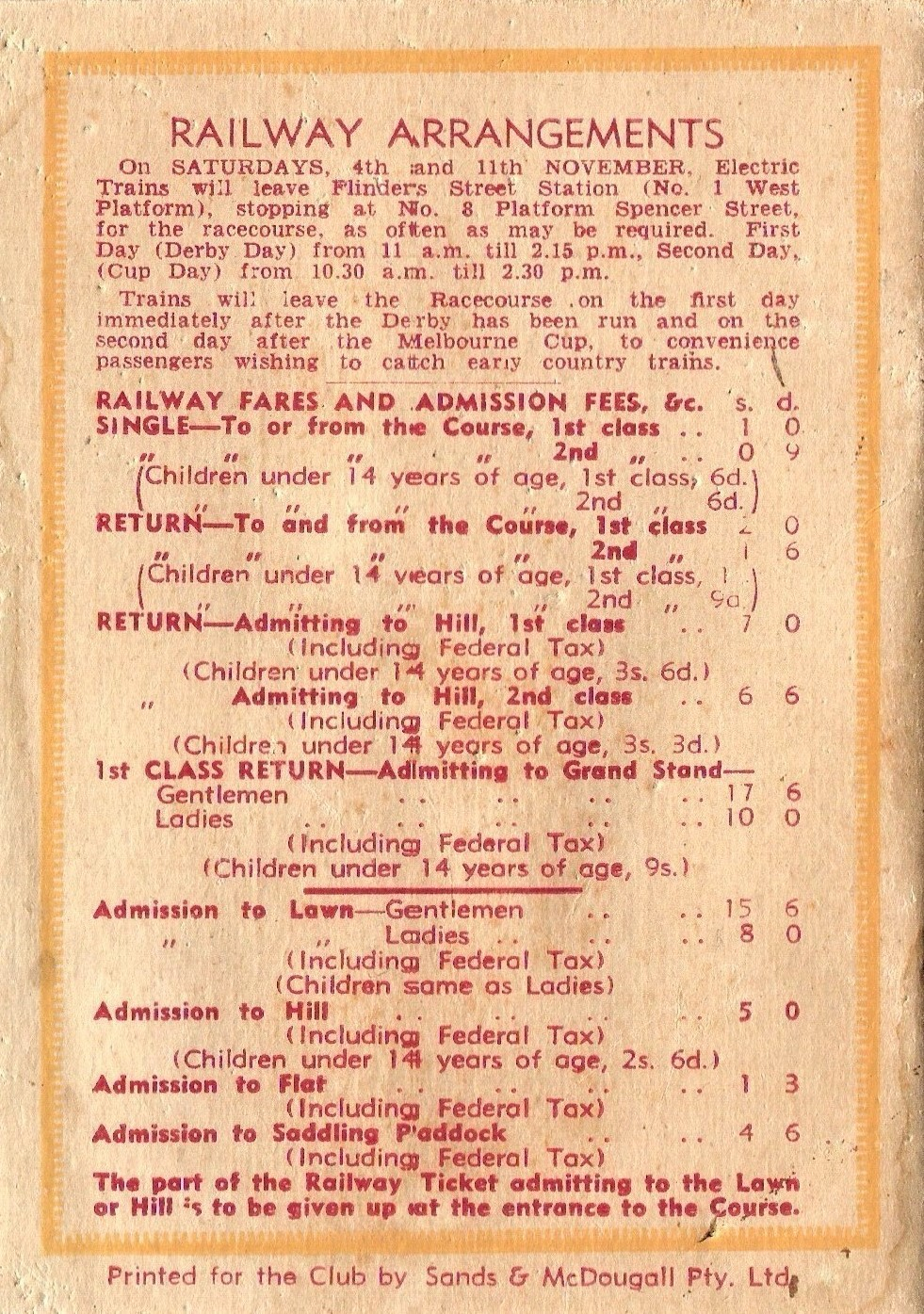
Back cover showing enclosure information

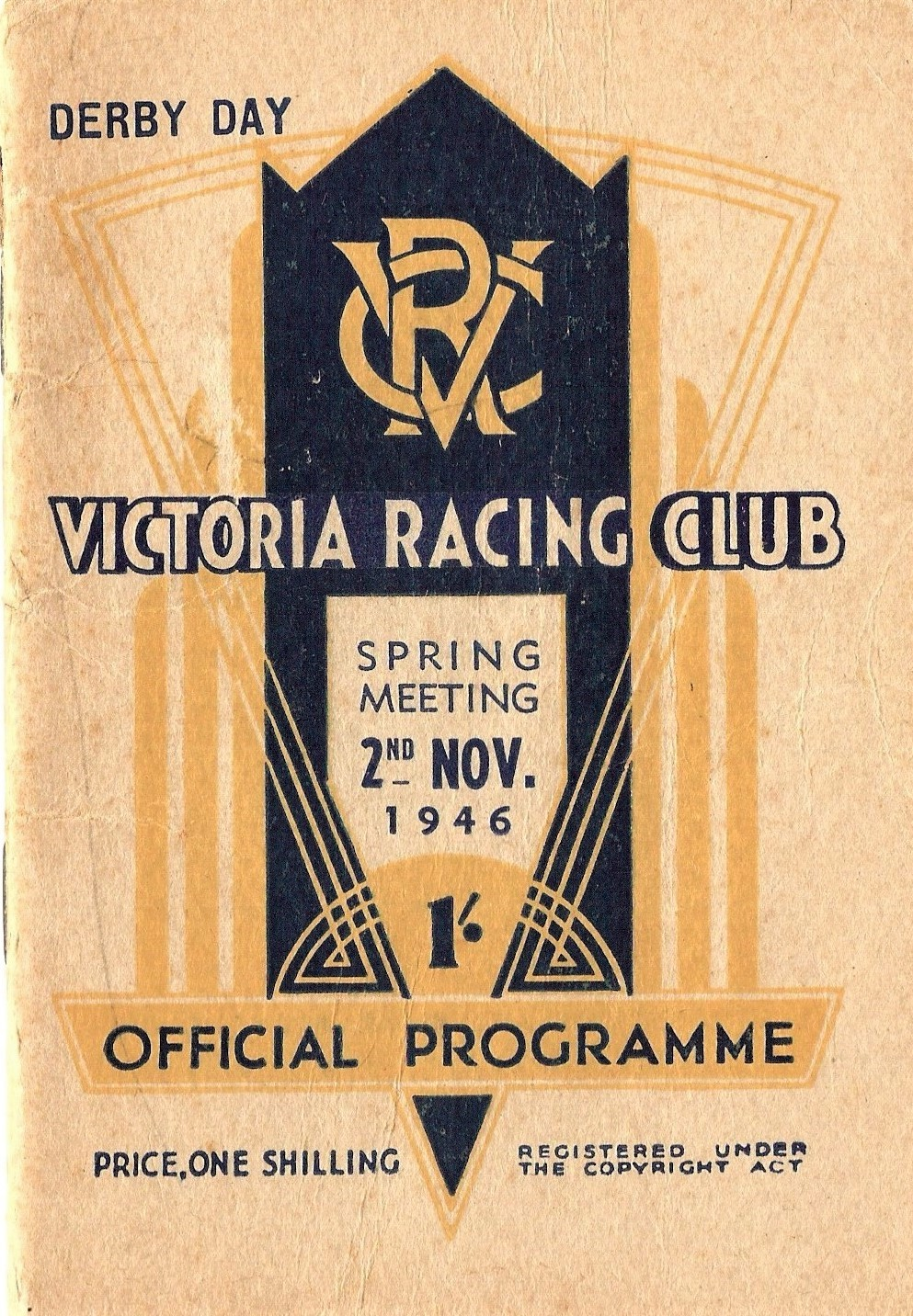
1946 VRC Derby racebook front cover

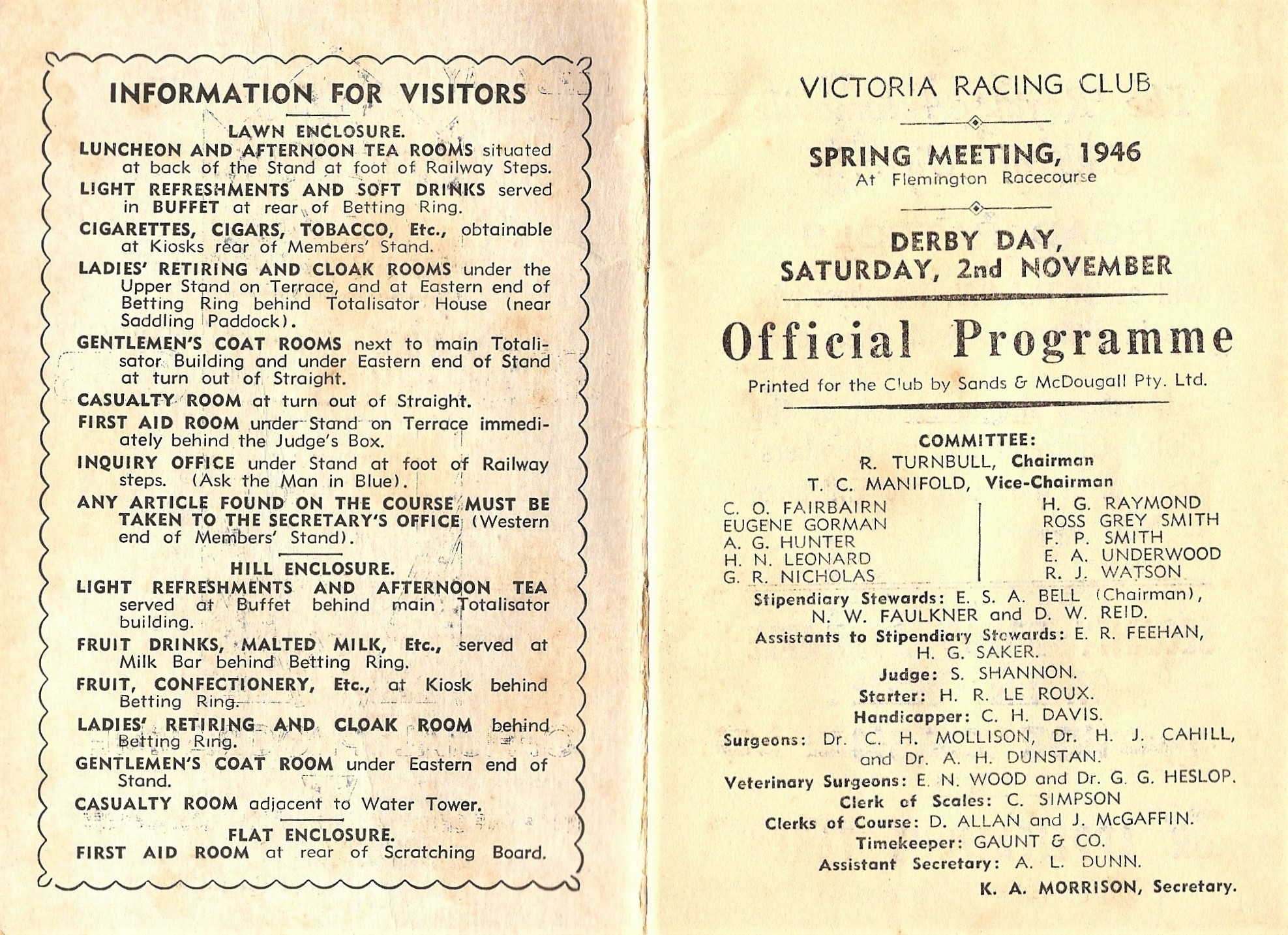
1946 VRC Derby raceday officials

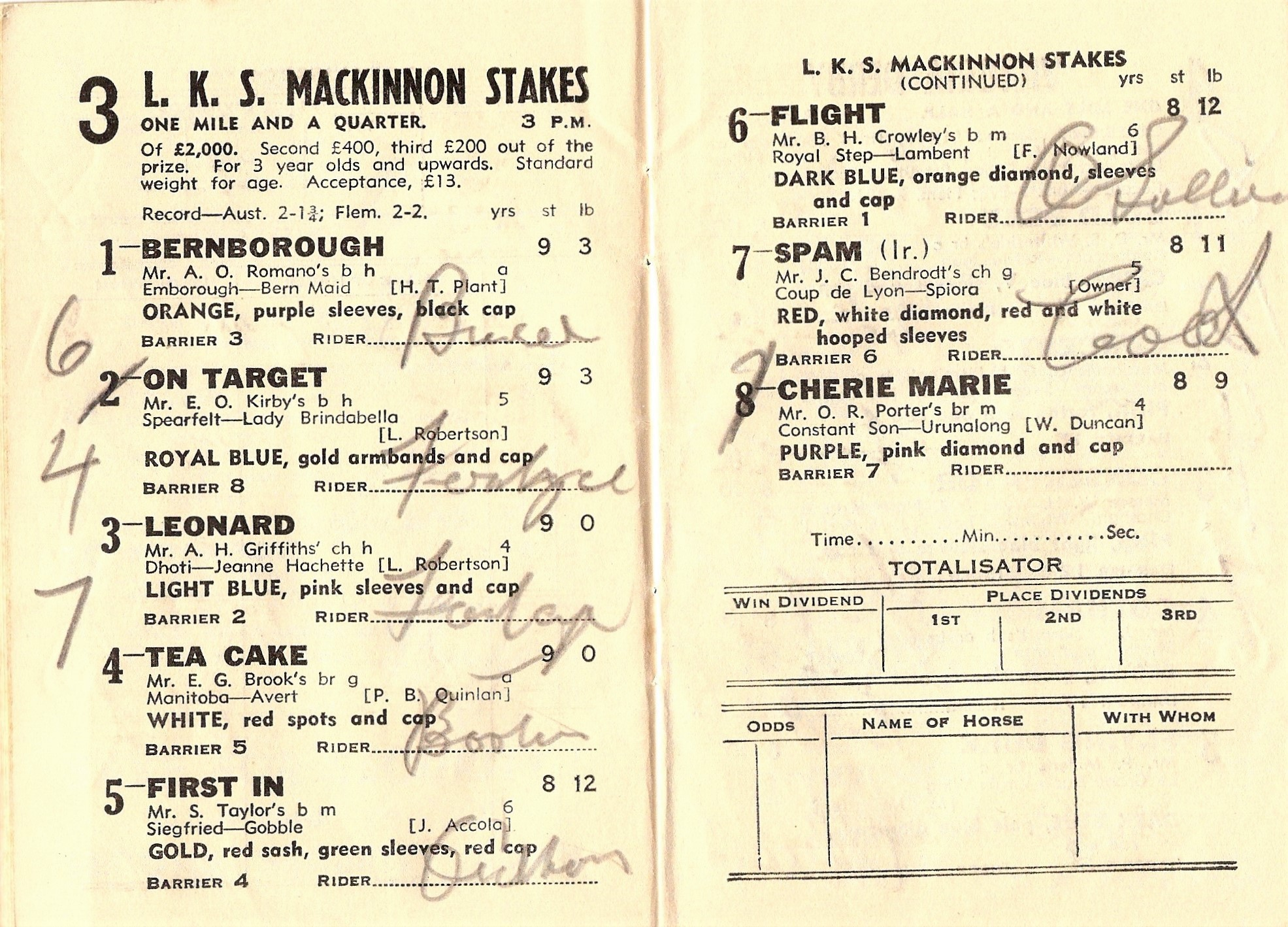
1946 VRC L.K.S. Mackinnon Stakes page and winner, Flight

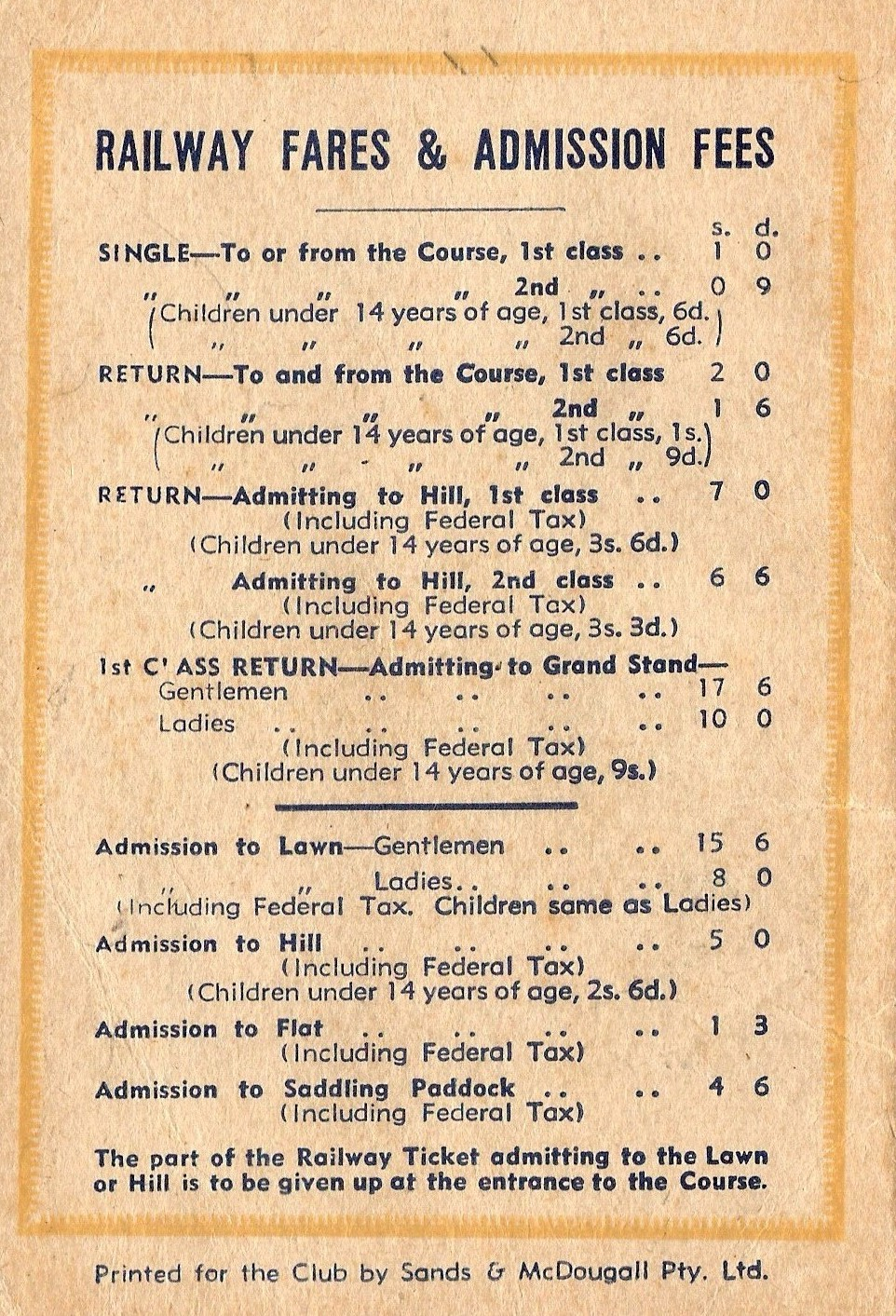
Back cover showing enclosure information

== 1953 and 1954 racebooks ==
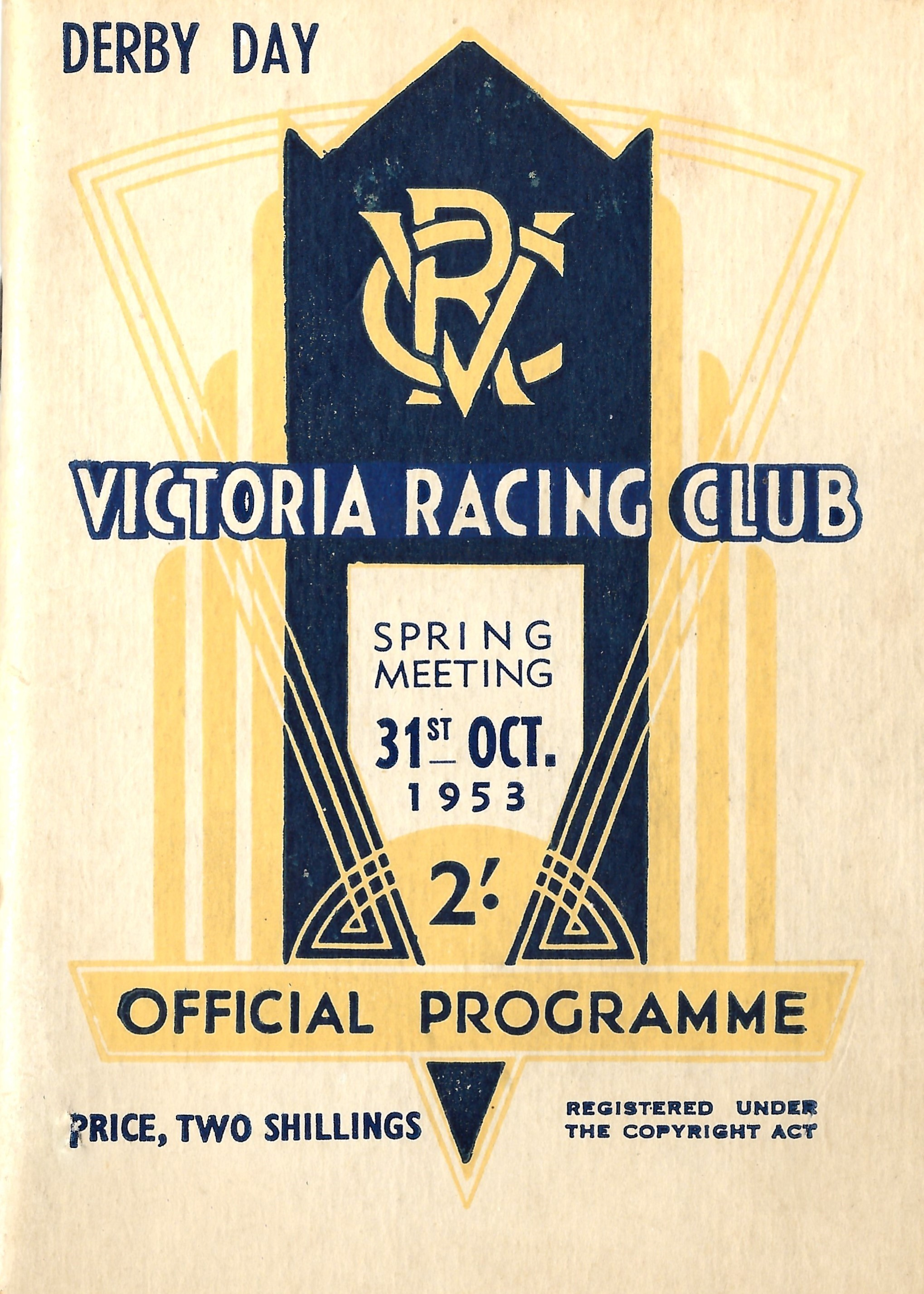
1953 VRC Derby racebook front cover

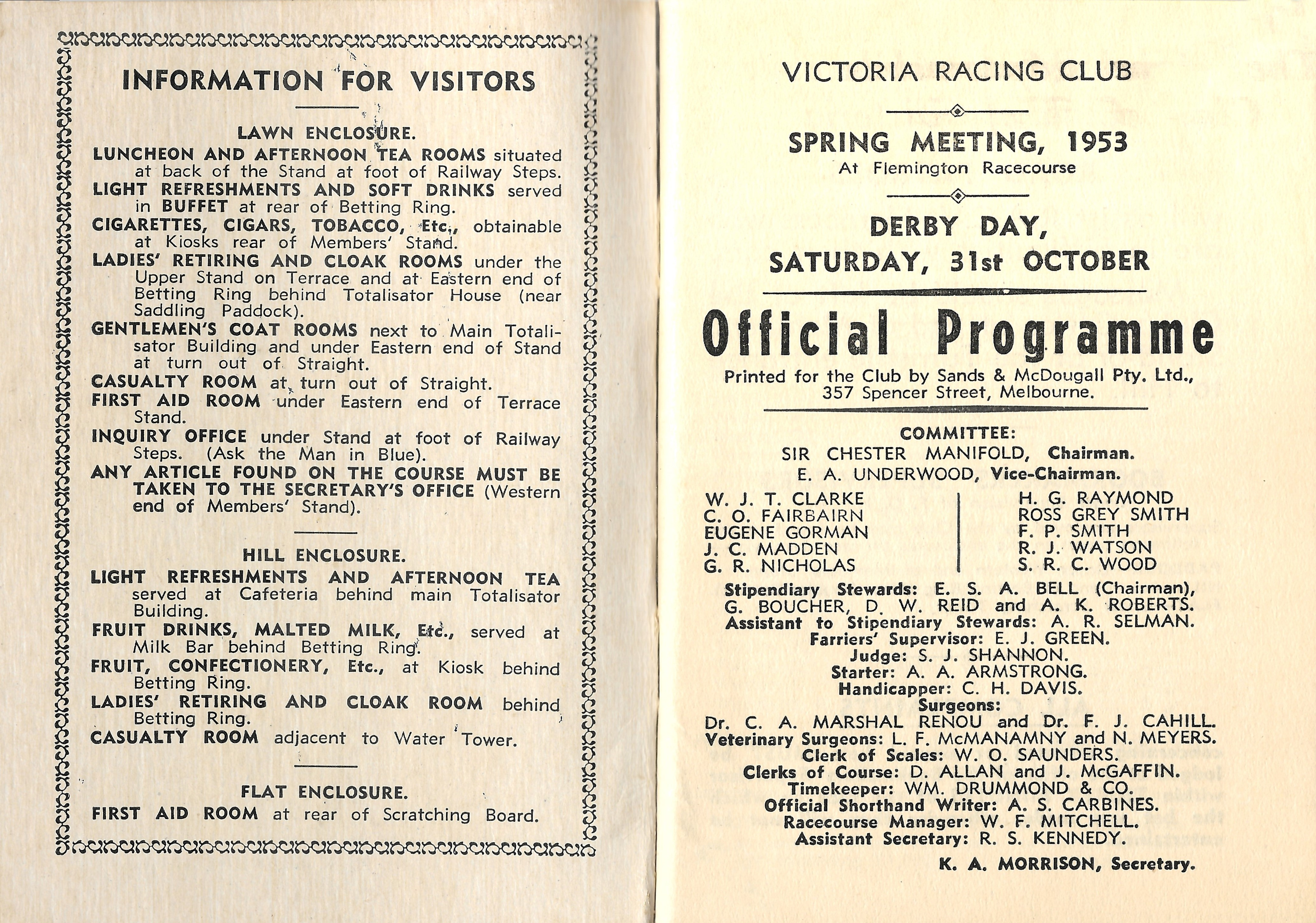
1953 VRC Derby raceday officials

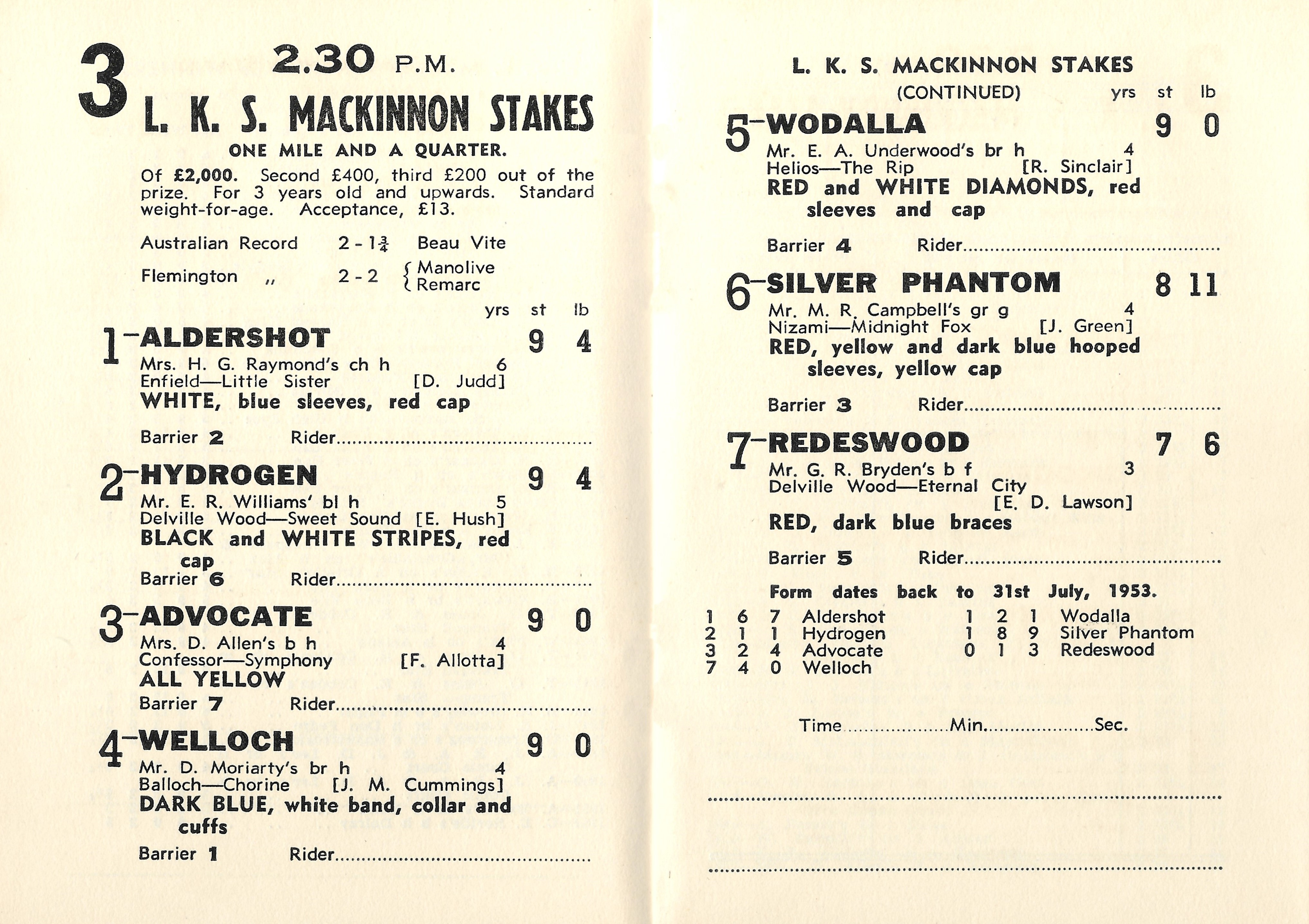
1953 VRC LKS Mackinnon Stakes winner, Hydrogen

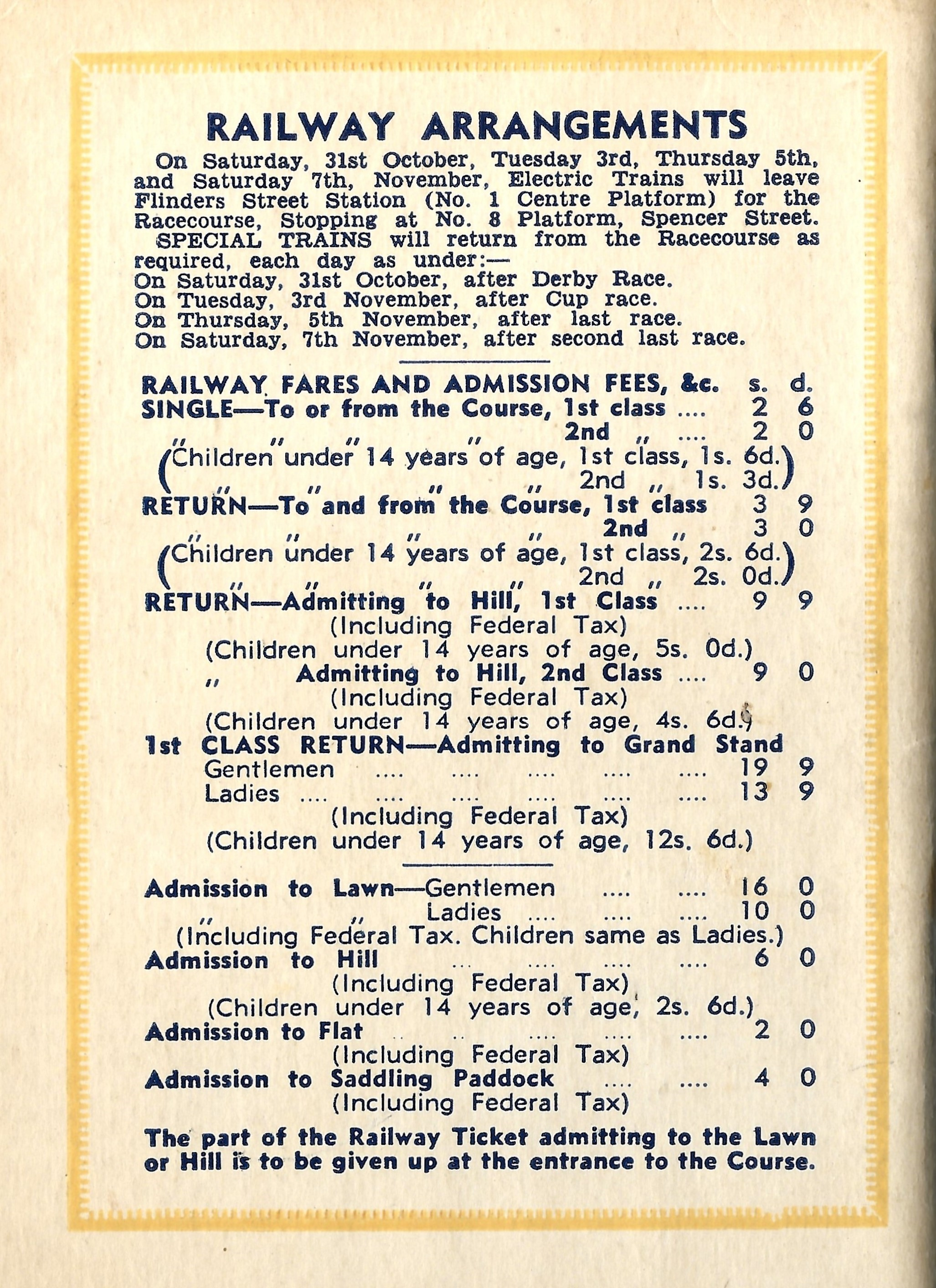
Back cover showing enclosure information

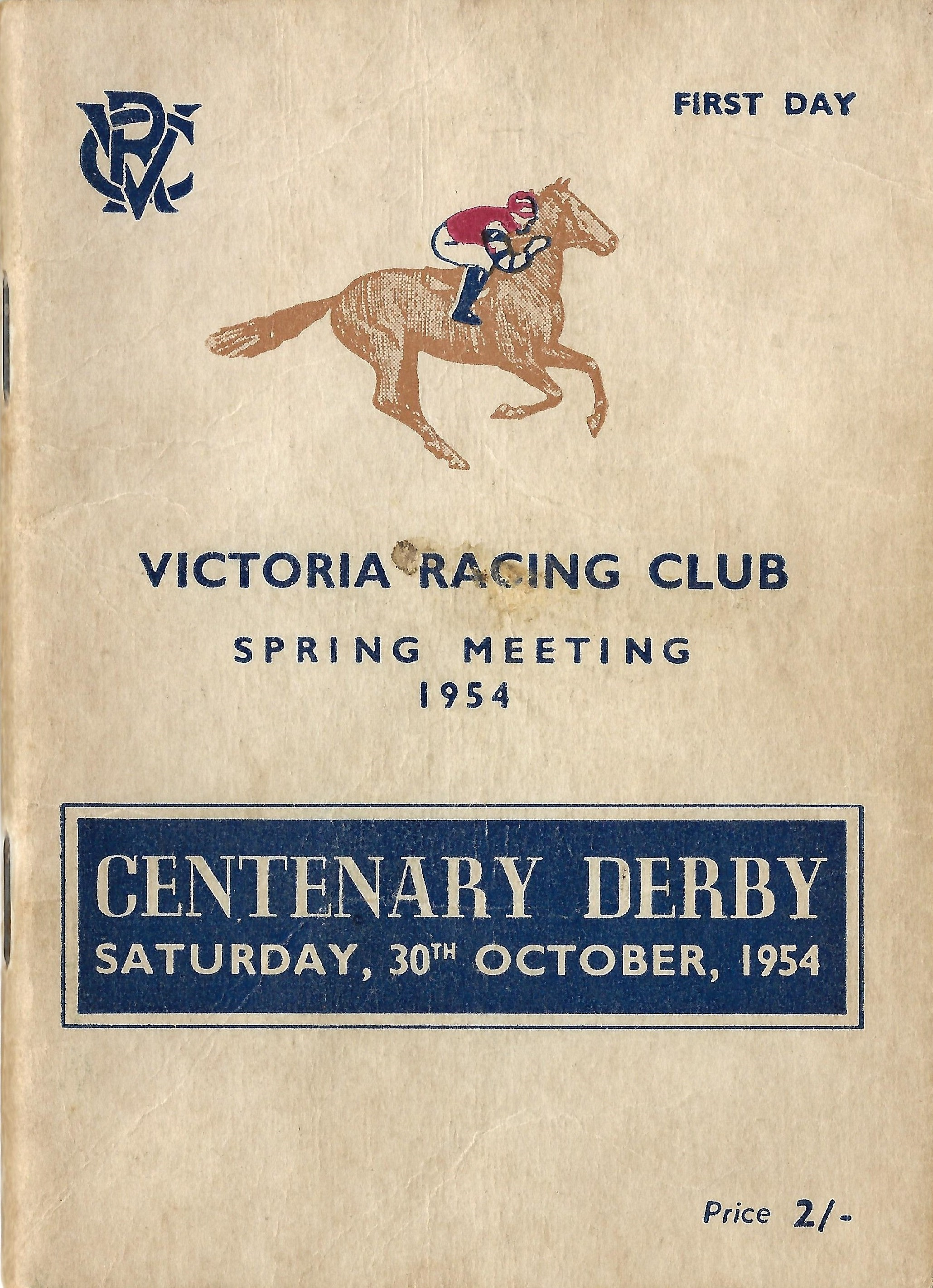
1954 VRC Derby racebook front cover

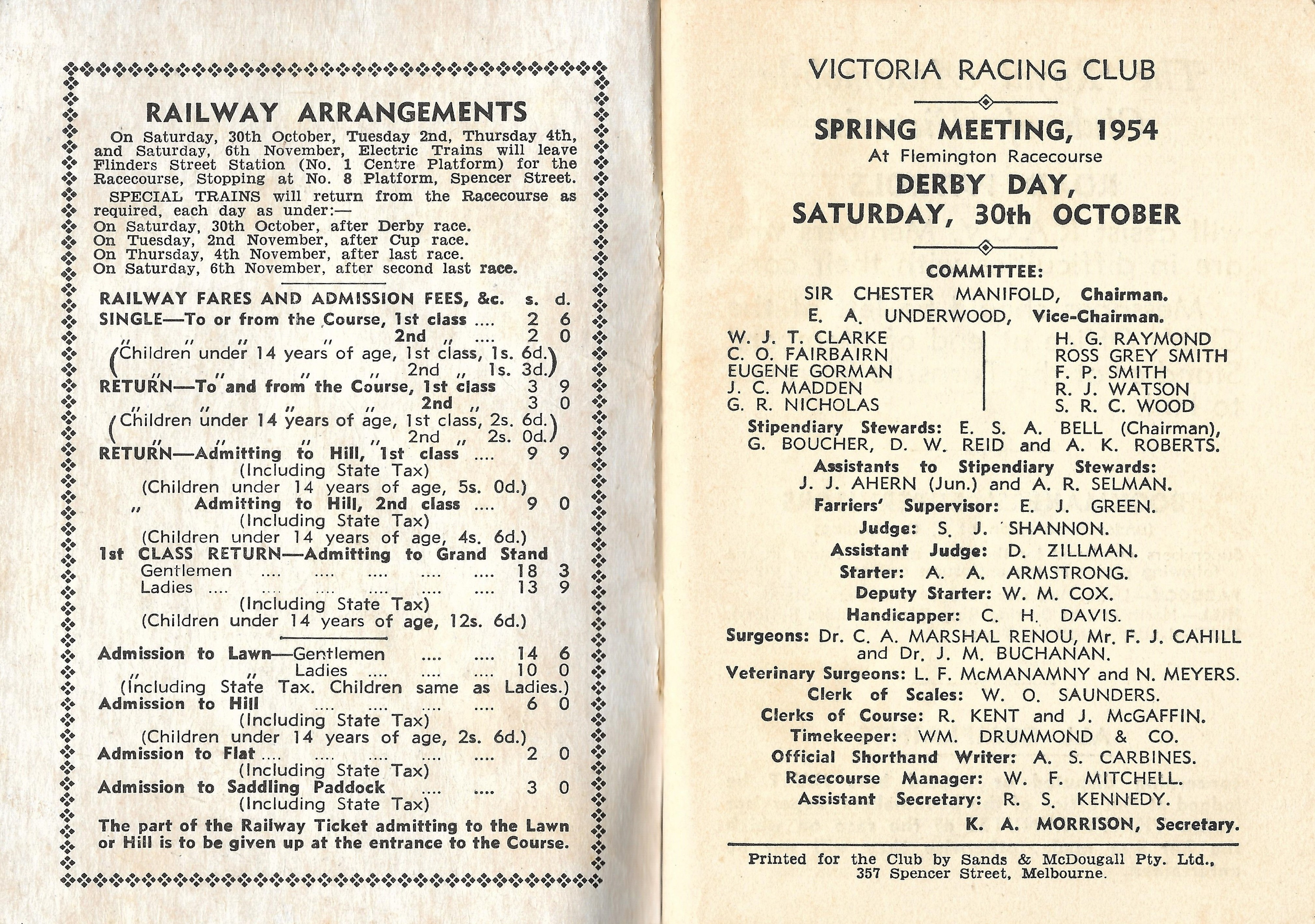
1954 VRC Derby raceday officials

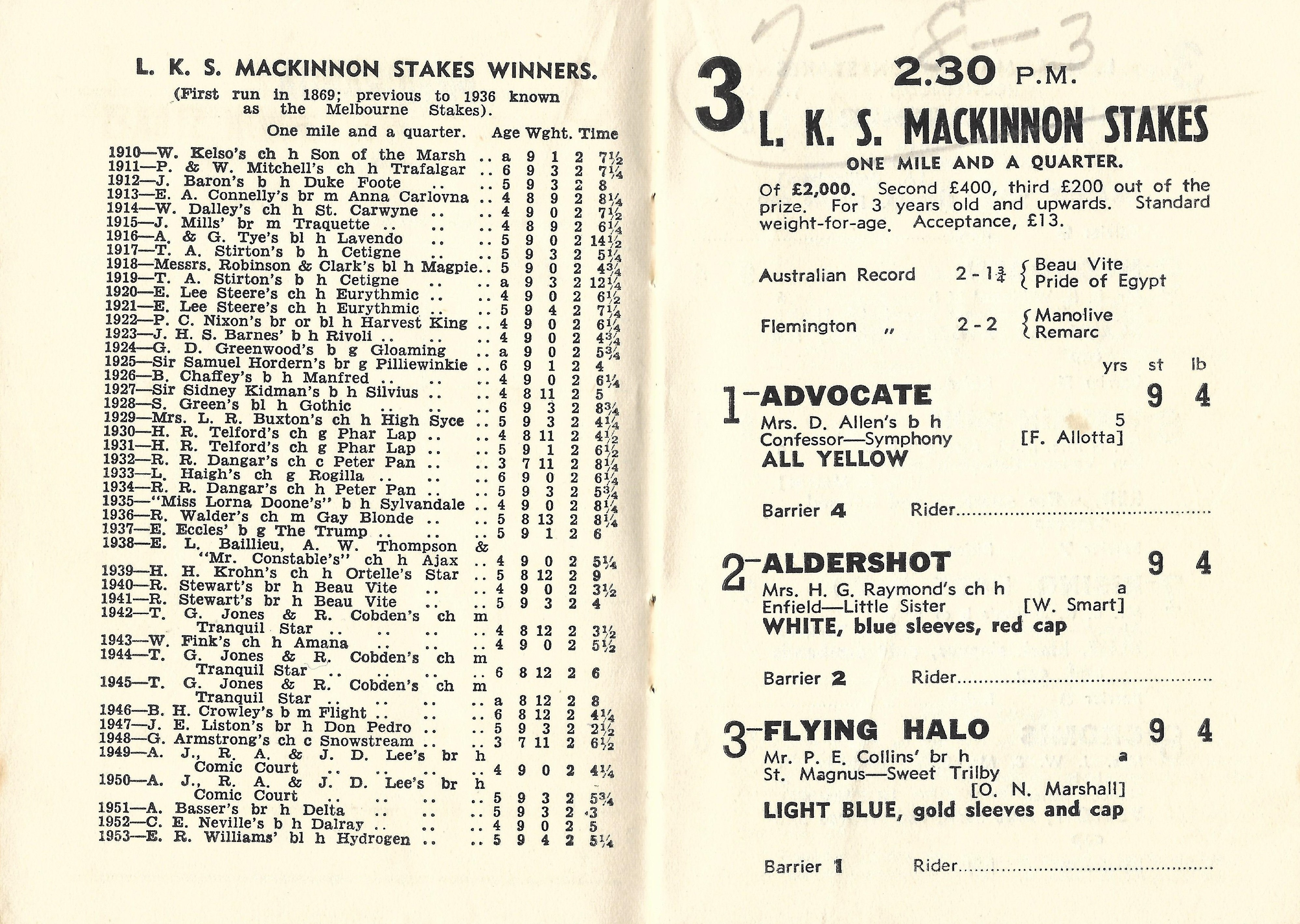
1954 VRC L.K.S. Mackinnon Stakes starters and results

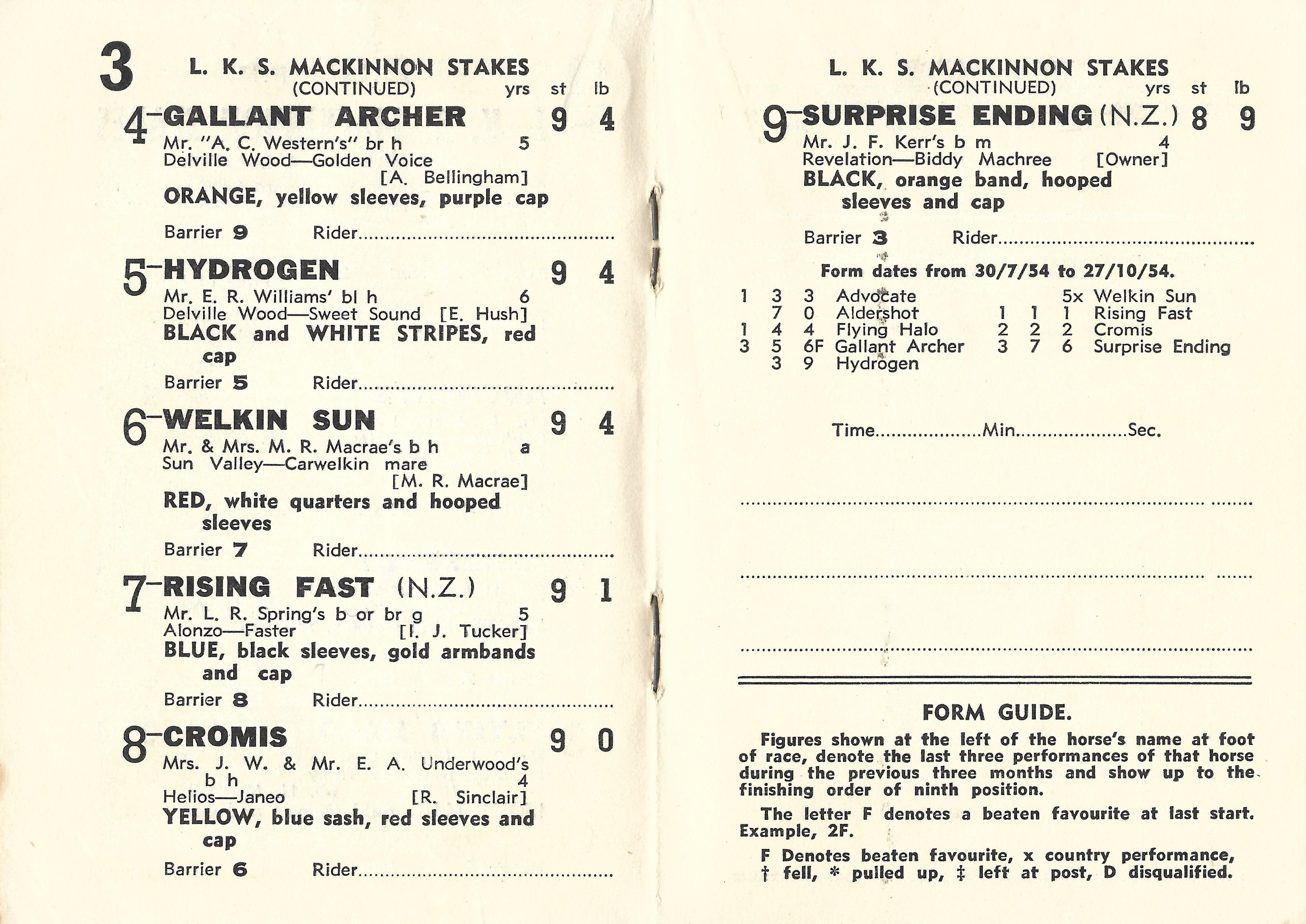
1954 VRC L.K.S. Mackinnon Stakes page showing the winner, Rising Fast

== Winners since 2000 ==
The following are past winners of the race.

Year	Winner	Age	Jockey	Trainer	Owner	Time
2026	Birdman	6	Ben Melham	Chris Waller	Mr A Kheir, Mr N A Greenhalgh, Grand Parkview Stud	2:01.98
2025	Via Sistina	8	James McDonald	Chris Waller	Yu Long Investments (Mgr: Y Zhang)	2:07.91
2024	Via Sistina	7	James McDonald	Chris Waller	Yu Long Investments (Mgr: Y Zhang)	2:01.86
2023	Atishu	6	James McDonald	Chris Waller	A J A Bosma, Mrs P J Clark et al.	2:02.01
2022	Zaaki	8	Jamie Kah	Annabel Neasham	C E Holt et al.	2:02.00
2021	Zaaki	7	James McDonald	Annabel Neasham	C E Holt et al.	2:02.94
2020	Arcadia Queen	5	Luke Currie	Grant & Alana Williams	Peters Investments Pty Ltd	2:03.53
2019	Magic Wand	5	Ryan Moore	Aidan O'Brien	Tabor, Smith & Magnier	2:01.82
2018	Trap For Fools	5	John Allen	Jarrod McLean	Distinct Racing	2:02.31
2017	Tosen Stardom	7	Damian Lane	Darren Weir	Australian Bloodstock, Doonaree Racing et al	2:01.22
2016	Awesome Rock	5	Stephen Baster	Leon & Troy Corstens	Stan Saric, Mrs J C Saric et al	2:02.49
2015	Gailo Chop	5	Ben Melham	Antoine De Watrigant	OTI Management, Werrett Bloodstock et al	2:03.56
2014	Happy Trails	7	Damien Oliver	Paul Beshara	Peter & Erica Dickmann	2:02.28
2013	Side Glance	7	Jamie Spencer	Andrew Balding	Pearl Bloodstock	2:03.59
2012	Alcopop	8	Craig Williams	Jake Stephens	J A Stephens, J P & Mrs S K Kelton et al	2:01.26
2011	Glass Harmonium	6	Damien Oliver	Mike Moroney	R & C Legh Racing, Lorne Bloodstock	2:02.72
2010	So You Think	4	Steven Arnold	Bart Cummings	Dato Tan Chin Nam	2:04.92
2009	Scenic Shot	7	Shane Scriven	Dan Morton	D L Morton, E A Galante et al	2:03.46
2008	Theseo	5	Nash Rawiller	Gai Waterhouse	Mike Townsend, P Evans et al	2:03.84
2007	Sirmione	4	Peter Mertens	Bart Cummings	Xipell, Covington & Smith	2:02.32
2006	Desert War	6	Chris Munce	Gai Waterhouse	Gooree Pastoral Company	2:02.38
2005	Lad of the Manor	6	Greg Childs	Simon Stout	David Thomas & Lorraine Smith	2:01.72
2004	Grand Armee	6	Damien Oliver	Gai Waterhouse	A R Bell	2:00.91
2003	Casual Pass	3	Glen Boss	Peter Morgan	Contract Racing Syndicate	2:05.86
2002	Lonhro	4	Darren Beadman	John Hawkes	Woodlands Stud	2:02.64
2001	La Bella Dama	4	Scott Seamer	Graeme Rogerson	Mrs C & Mrs D Howell et al	2:01.57
2000	Oliver Twist	6	Greg Childs	Brian Mayfield-Smith	Gainsborough Lodge Syndicat	2:04.48

== Earlier winners ==
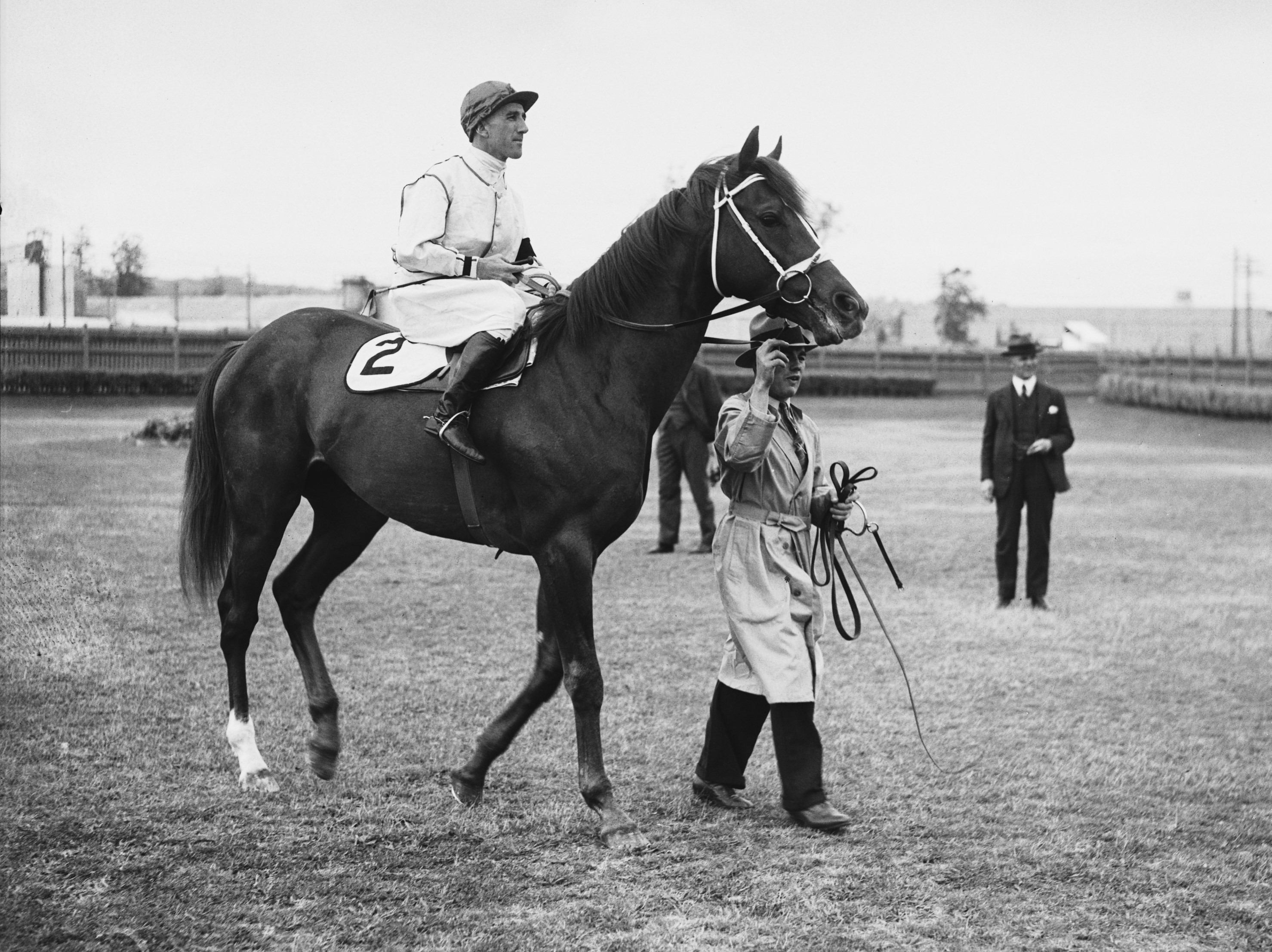
Ajax, 1938 winner

- 1999 - Rogan Josh
- 1998 - Champagne
- 1997 - Ebony Grosve
- 1996 - All Our Mob
- 1995 - Danewin
- 1994 - Paris Lane
- 1993 - The Phantom
- 1992 - Veandercross
- 1991 - Let's Elope
- 1990 - Better Loosen Up
- 1989 - Horlicks
- 1988 - Empire Rose
- 1987 - Rubiton
- 1986 - At Talaq
- 1985 - Rising Prince
- 1984 - Bounty Hawk
- 1983 - Veloso
- 1982 - My Axeman
- 1981 - Belmura Lad
- 1980 - Belmura Lad
- 1979 - Dulcify
- 1978 - Family Of Man
- 1977 - Silver Lad
- 1976 - Gold and Black
- 1975 - Kiwi Can
- 1974 - Leilani
- 1973 - Australasia
- 1972 - Stormy Seas
- 1971 - Skint Dip
- 1970 - Voleur
- 1969 - Roman Consul
- 1968 - Rain Lover
- 1967 - Winfreux
- 1966 - Tobin Bronze
- 1965 - Yangtze
- 1964 - Sir Dane
- 1963 - Summer Fair
- 1962 - Aquanita
- 1961 - Sky High
- 1960 - Tulloch
- 1959 - Trellios
- 1958 - Monte Carlo
- 1957 - Sailor's Guide
- 1956 - Sir William
- 1955 - Rising Fast
- 1954 - Rising Fast
- 1953 - Hydrogen
- 1952 - Dalray
- 1951 - Delta
- 1950 - Comic Court
- 1949 - Comic Court
- 1948 - Snowstream
- 1947 - Don Pedro
- 1946 - Flight
- 1945 - Tranquil Star
- 1944 - Tranquil Star
- 1943 - Amana
- 1942 - Tranquil Star
- 1941 - Beau Vite
- 1940 - Beau Vite
- 1939 - Ortelle's Star
- 1938 - Ajax
- 1937 - The Trump

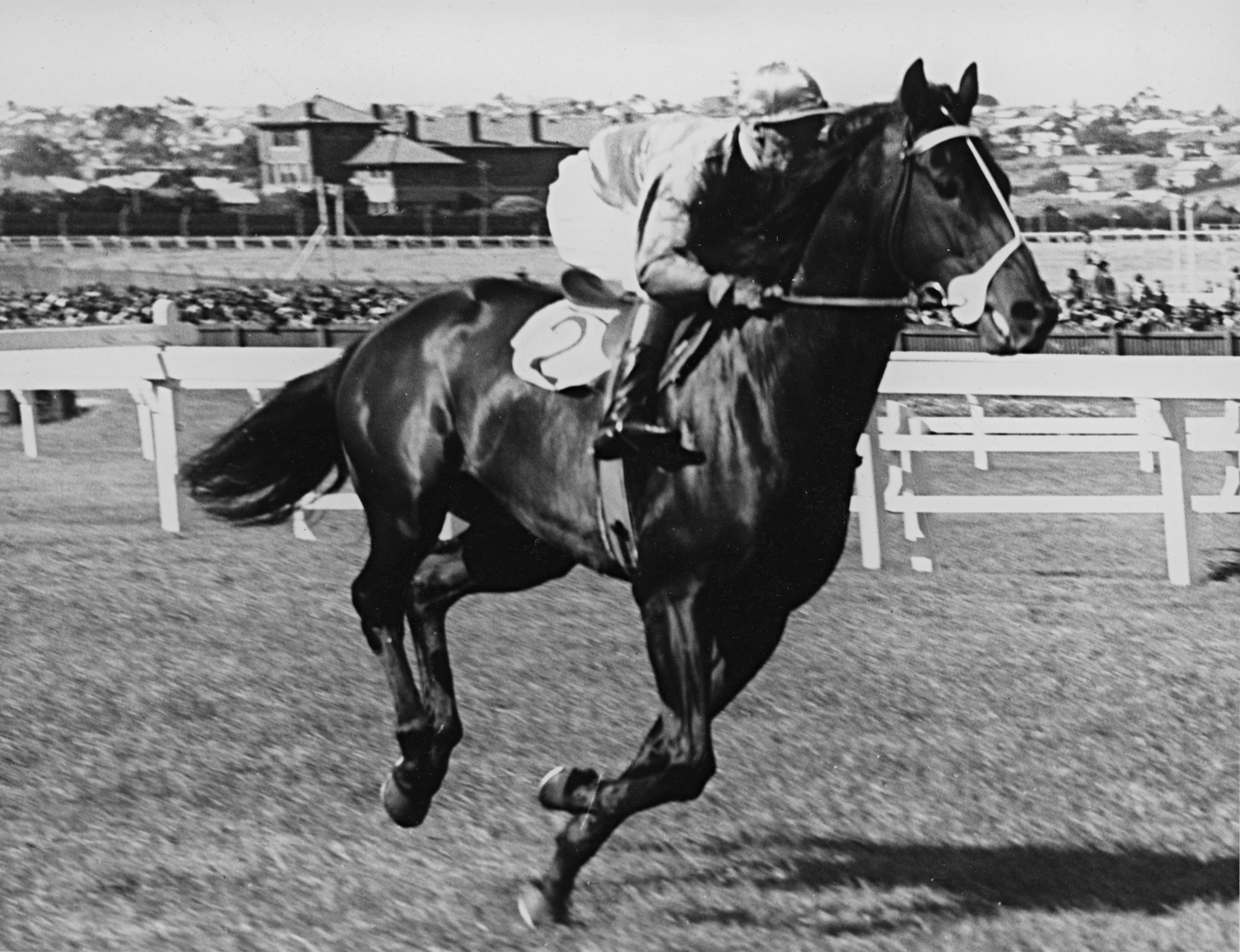
Beau Vite, 1940 & 1941 winner

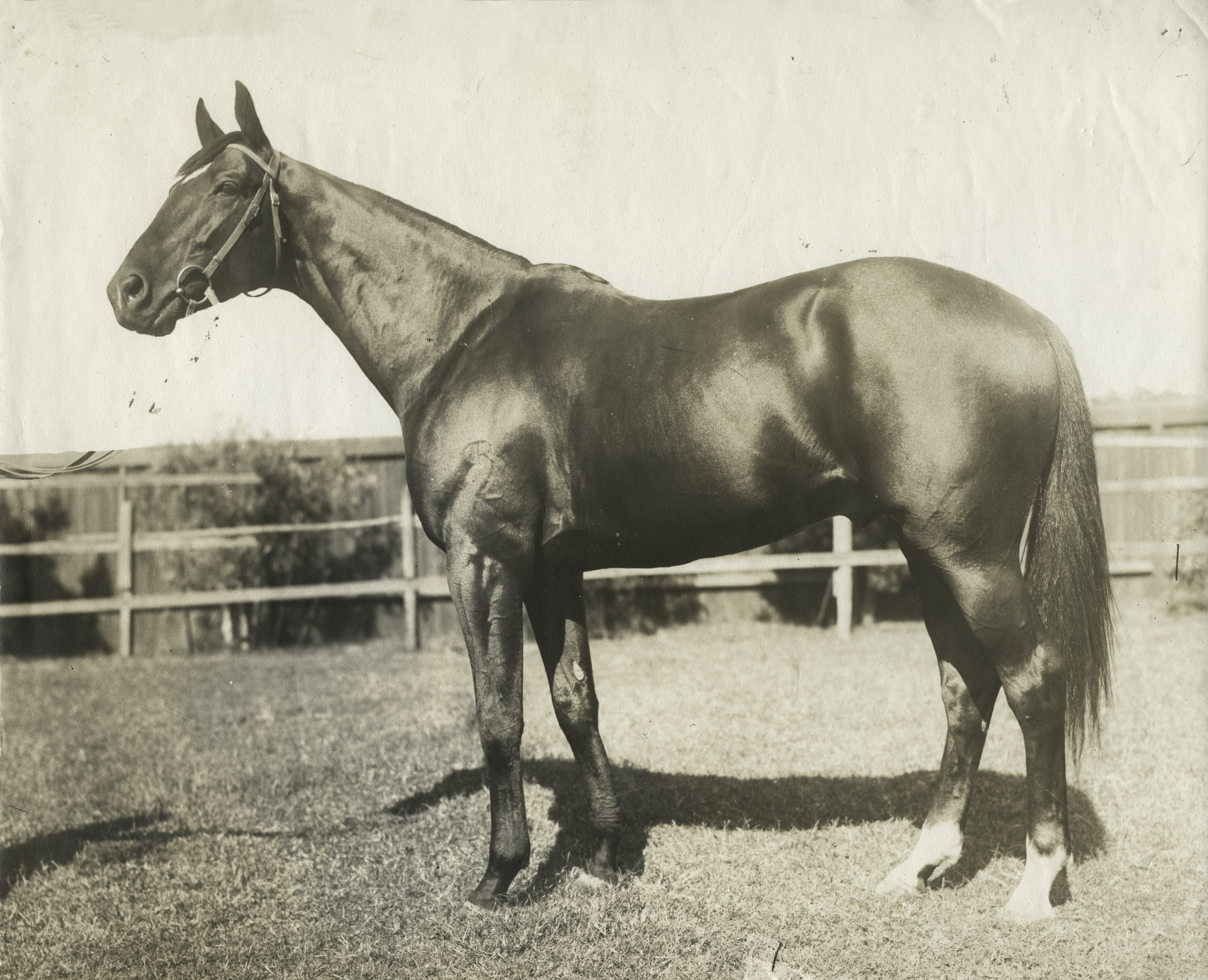
1907 winner – Poseidon

=== Melbourne Stakes (1869–1936) ===
- 1936 - Gay Blonde
- 1935 - Sylvandale
- 1934 - Peter Pan
- 1933 - Rogilla
- 1932 - Peter Pan
- 1931 - Phar Lap
- 1930 - Phar Lap
- 1929 - High Syce
- 1928 - Gothic
- 1927 - Silvius
- 1926 - Manfred
- 1925 - Pilliewinkie
- 1924 - Gloaming
- 1923 - Rivoli
- 1922 - Harvest King
- 1921 - Eurythmic
- 1920 - Eurythmic
- 1919 - Cetigne
- 1918 - Magpie
- 1917 - Cetigne
- 1916 - Lavendo
- 1915 - Traquette
- 1914 - St. Carwyne
- 1913 - Anna Carlovna
- 1912 - Duke Foote
- 1911 - Trafalgar
- 1910 - Son Of The Marsh
- 1909 - Alawa
- 1908 - Peru
- 1907 - Poseidon
- 1906 - Solution
- 1905 - Tartan
- 1904 - Gladsome
- 1903 - Wakeful
- 1902 - Wakeful
- 1901 - Wakeful
- 1900 - Lancaster
- 1899 - Mora
- 1898 - Battalion
- 1897 - Battalion
- 1896 - Disfigured
- 1895 - Hova
- 1894 - Ruenalf
- 1893 - Loyalty
- 1892 - Autonomy
- 1891 - Marvel
- 1890 - Carbine
- 1889 - Abercorn
- 1888 - The Australian Peer
- 1887 - Silver Mine
- 1886 - Isonomy‡ / Boolka
- 1885 - Trenton
- 1884 - Malua
- 1883 - Commotion
- 1882 - Darebin
- 1881 - Wheatear
- 1880 - Chester
- 1879 - First King
- 1878 - Chester
- 1877 - Robinson Crusoe
- 1876 - Rapid Bay
- 1875 - Kingsborough
- 1874 - Dagworth
- 1873 - Dagworth
- 1872 - Contessa
- 1871 - Warrior
- 1870 - Tim Whiffler
- 1869 - Glencoe

Key:
‡ Won dead heat run off.

== See also ==
- Champions Mile (VRC)
- Champions Sprint (VRC)
- Matriarch Stakes (VRC)
- Queen Elizabeth Stakes
- List of Australian Group races
- Group races
