= Manfred (horse) =

Australian Thoroughbred racehorse

Manfred (AUS)
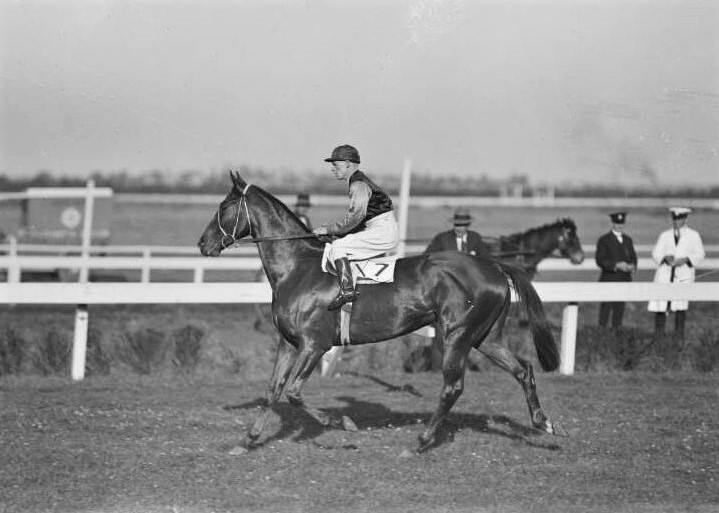
- Manfred & W.Duncan
- Sire: Valais (GB)
- Grandsire: Cicero (GB)
- Dam: Otford (AUS)
- Damsire: Tressady (GB)
- Sex: Stallion
- Foaled: 1922
- Died: 1940
- Country: Australia
- Colour: Bay
- Owner: Ben Chaffey
- Trainer: Harry McCalman
- Record: 28: 11-5-2
- Earnings: £29,830

Major wins
- VRC Derby (1925); AJC Derby (1925); Champagne Stakes (1925); W. S. Cox Plate (1925); Caulfield Stakes (1926); Caulfield Cup (1926); Melbourne Stakes (1926); October Stakes (1926)

Honours
- Manfred Stakes

Manfred was an Australian Thoroughbred race horse.

By the champion sire Valais (GB) the Leading sire in Australia for 5 seasons between 1923 and 1928 from the mare Otford (AUS). Grandsire Cicero won the 1905 Epsom Derby. Manfred was purchased at the 1924 Sydney Easter Yearling Sales for the sum of 1,400 guineas by Ben Chaffey.

== Racing record ==
A temperamental horse, he officially raced 28 times in his career; however, he only took part in 22 of them, refusing to gallop in six of those races.

He had an unimpressive record as a 2YO, finishing well beaten in six races before his first win.

Manfred went on to record victories in races including the 1925 VRC Derby, AJC Derby, Champagne Stakes and the W. S. Cox Plate as well as the 1926 Caulfield Cup.

His most famous performance was in the AJC Derby where he refused to start until all six of his rivals had travelled half a furlong (100m). His jockey, Billy Duncan managed to get him going where he eventually overtook the field and won the race by 1 ½ lengths.

A week later he refused to gallop in the Caulfield Guineas but went on to win the Cox Plate and VRC Derby at subsequent starts.

Following his refusal to start in the final two times he went to the barrier he was retired to stud.

== Stud record ==
Manfred enjoyed considerable success at stud and among the best of his progeny were The Trump (winner of the 1937 Caulfield-Melbourne Cup double), Red Manfred, Mildura, Manolive and Manrico.

For the last two years of his life, he was a pensioner at the stud and then, rather than risk the old horse seriously injuring himself, in June 1940 he was humanely destroyed.

== Sources ==
- "Manfred - The Prodigal Son". Kings of the Turf. 17 March 2018.
- Pollard, Jack. Australian Horse Racing. Angus & Robertson. p. 330. ISBN 0207154678.
- Kirkwood, Rhett; Meldrum, Brian (2000). Valley of the Kings : a history of the W.S. Cox plate. Equus Marketing. p. 54. ISBN 0957797303.
- Racehorsetalk. "Manfred Race Records". www.racehorsetalk.com.au.
- Pedigreequery. "Manfred Pedigree". pedigreequery.com.
- Australian Stud Book. "Manfred Stake Winners". www.studbook.org.au.
- Leading Sires in Australia. "Valais Leading Australian Sire". www.tbheritage.com.
