= Silver Lad =

New Zealand-bred Thoroughbred racehorse

- Sire: Silver Dream
- Grandsire: Tudor Melody
- Dam: Leta Filou
- Damsire: Le Filou (FR)
- Sex: Stallion
- Foaled: 1973
- Country: New Zealand
- Colour: Bay
- Breeder: R P Kellow
- Owner: D & Mrs Nicholls & R R Peel-Walker
- Trainer: B Petley

Major wins
- New Zealand Derby (1977); Mackinnon Stakes (1977)
- Last updated on 5 July 2009

Silver Lad was a Thoroughbred racehorse and sire who won the New Zealand Derby in 1976. In Australia he was known as Sir Silver Lad (NZ) to differentiate him from another Silver Lad.

The time for his 1977 Derby win was 2:29.76, just the second time the race had been run in less than two minutes and thirty seconds.

During 1977 he won AJC Australasian Champion Stakes, ARC Clifford Plate, RotRC Rotorua Challenge Stakes, VRC LKS Mackinnon Stakes and the WRC Wellington Derby Stakes.

Standing at stud in Australia he sired Dolcezza, winner of the 1986 STC Canterbury Guineas. He died on 22 September 1997.
