= The Trump (horse) =

Australian-bred Thoroughbred racehorse

The Trump (AUS)
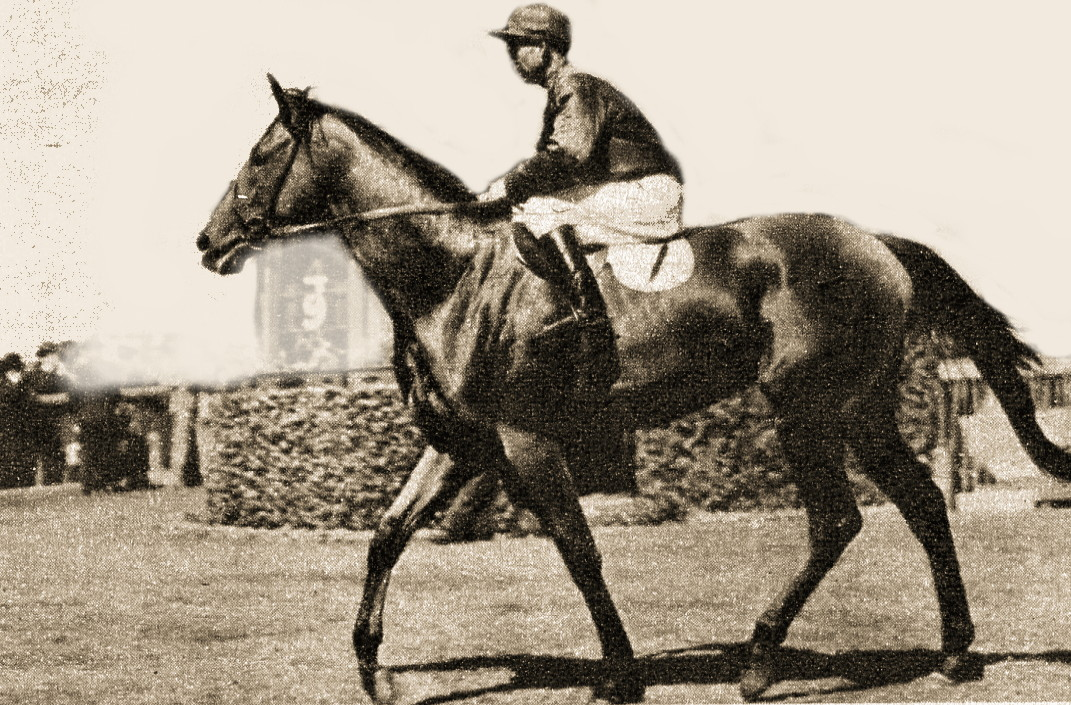
- Sire: Manfred (AUS)
- Grandsire: Valais (GB)
- Dam: Koanie
- Damsire: Spearhead (GB)
- Sex: Gelding
- Foaled: 1932
- Died: 1955
- Country: Australia
- Colour: Bay
- Owner: E. “Darcy” Eccles
- Trainer: Stan W. Reid
- Record: 48:10-3-7

Major wins
- Caulfield Cup (1937); Toorak Handicap (1937); LKS Mackinnon Stakes (1937); Melbourne Cup (1937)
- Last updated on 28 May 2010

The Trump (1932–1955) was an Australian-bred Thoroughbred racehorse who won the Caulfield-Melbourne Cup double as well as two other principal (Group One) (G1) races in 1937.

He showed his versatility by winning races over distances of six furlongs to two miles.

== Breeding ==
He was a small horse (15 hands 1 inch) by the temperamental racehorse Manfred who was by the successful sire, Valais (GB).

His dam, Koanie, was by the racehorse Spearhead (GB), who sired 22 stakes-winners.

Koanie was also the dam of Legislator, 1939 by Law Maker (IRE), who won the 1942 Tasmanian Guineas and later sired 9 stakes-winners for a total 19 stakes-wins between them.

== Racing record ==
Racing as a two-year-old, The Trump won the VATC Stakes and was placed in three other starts during the season.

As a three-year-old, he won the Stand Handicap and ran third in the Caulfield Guineas, after which he was made the favourite for the Caulfield Cup. It was not intended that The Trump should start in the cup and owing to knee problems he had his knees pin-fired and was gelded before being spelled.

Returning as a four-year-old, he won the Derrimut Handicap over six furlongs at Moonee Valley. In early 1937, The Trump won the Malakoff Stakes over nine furlongs at Caulfield before having a brief letup. His next win was the (G1) Toorak Handicap on the first day of the Caulfield Cup meeting.

After winning the Caulfield Cup and LKS Mackinnon Stakes he was aimed at the rare Melbourne Cup double. His win in the Melbourne Cup was The Trump’s sixth successive win.

See Caulfield Cup Race history for a complete list of winners of the Caulfield-Melbourne Cup double.

After The Trump was retired from racing, he was used to carry Eccles' nieces and nephews to school.

== See also ==
- List of racehorses
