= Farnan (horse) =

Australian thoroughbred racehorse

- Sire: Not A Single Doubt
- Dam: Tallow
- Sex: Colt
- Foaled: 6 October 2017
- Country: Australia
- Colour: Bay
- Breeder: Phoenix Thoroughbred
- Owner: Aquis Farm, Phoenix Thoroughbred
- Trainer: Gai Waterhouse & Adrian Bott
- Record: 8: 5–0–0
- Earnings: A$ 2,507,450

Major wins
- Silver Slipper (2020); Todman Stakes (2020); Golden Slipper (2020)

Awards
- Australian Two Year Old of the Year (2019/20)

Farnan (foaled 6 October 2017) is a Group 1 winning Australian bred thoroughbred racehorse who is most notable for winning the 2020 Golden Slipper.

== Background ==
Farnan was purchased for $550,000 by Phoenix Thoroughbreds/Aquis Farms out of the Vinery Stud draft at the 2019 Magic Millions Gold Coast Yearling Sale. Farnan was bred by Phoenix and is the sixth foal of the talented Tallow, daughter of Street Cry, and winner of a Group III race The Vanity.

== Racing career ==
=== 2019/20: two-year-old season ===
Farnan made his race debut on the 17 November 2019 at Canberra Racecourse. In a small field of 5 runners he started a $1.80 favourite. Ridden on the pace in the 1,000 metre event by jockey Winona Costin, Farnan raced away to win by 5 lengths. After the race Costin stated, “He’s a very kind horse. Even walking behind the barriers, he was nice and relaxed. He stood nicely in the barriers and flew out. The other one just wanted to take up the lead and I was happy to take the sit. He relaxed beautifully there, but when I asked him for an effort he had a really good turn of foot and I was able to ease him down on the line.”

Four weeks later, Farnan ran in the Magic Millions Wyong 2YO Classic over 1,100 metres. Ridden by Tim Clark he started second favourite at odds of $2.90 behind Every Rose, who had been successful in the Gimcrack Stakes at his previous start. Farnan began the race smartly and camped outside the lead before shooting clear in the straight to score by a length over Every Rose. After the race co-trainer Adrian Bott commented on Farnan's professional attitude towards racing and that his next run would be in the Magic Millions Classic at the Gold Coast Turf Club, a race worth $2,000,000 in prize money.

A month later, Farnan competed in the Magic Millions Classic. Again ridden by Tim Clark he started the third favourite at odds of $7, however he tasted defeat for the first time when finishing in 10th position.

Farnan then resumed racing six weeks later in the Silver Slipper Stakes at Rosehill Racecourse. With new jockey Hugh Bowman on board, Farnan was heavily backed from odds of $10 into $7.50. He won the race comfortably by over three lengths and booked a place in the Golden Slipper. Co-trainer Adrian Bott was full of praise for the colt after the race, “There is a great sense of timing about this horse. He has always proven to be a top-class colt for us and he showed that very early in his career. Unfortunately, he wasn’t able to show that in the Magic Millions but he had genuine excuses for that.”

Two weeks later, Farnan contested the Todman Stakes at Randwick Racecourse over 1,200 metres in what was to be his final lead up race to the Golden Slipper. Starting the $1.80 favourite, many believed his main competition would come from the colt Tagaloa, who at his previous start had won the Blue Diamond Stakes. Farnan jumped well at the start of the race and was taken straight to the lead by jockey Hugh Bowman. The horse led all the way, beating Tagaloa by almost 2 lengths.

Three weeks later on the 21 March, Farnan started the $4.80 favourite in the Golden Slipper, a race worth $3,500,000 prize money. Due to the COVID-19 pandemic in Australia, the race was run in front of no spectators at Sydney's Rosehill Racecourse. Farnan produced an authoritative onspeed performance, holding off the challenge of runner-up, the Magic Millions Classic winner Away Game, by 1-3/4 lengths. The win was the first Golden Slipper victory for jockey Hugh Bowman and co-trainer Adrian Bott. The victory was a record seventh for trainer Gai Waterhouse, surpassing the six wins achieved by her father T J Smith.

=== 2020/21: three-year-old season ===
Farnan resumed racing on the 13 September 2020 in The Run To The Rose at Rosehill. He set a cracking speed throughout the race, leading by as much as 5 lengths, however he eventually faded running 5th. Jockey Hugh Bowman was heavily criticised for his handling of the horse and was charged by stewards for failing to give the horse every reasonable and permissible chance to win.

Bowman was replaced as Farnan's jockey by Glen Boss in his next start the Coolmore Stud Stakes at Flemington. The horse was beaten some 9 lengths and pulled up lame after the run. This would prove to be Farnan's last race start.

== Stud career ==
Farnan commenced stallion duties at Kia Ora Stud in the Hunter Valley of New South Wales in 2021 for an initial service fee of $55,000.

== Pedigree ==
Pedigree of Farnan (AUS) 2017
Sire Not A Single Doubt (AUS) 2001	Redoute's Choice (AUS); 1996	Danehill	Danzig
Sire Not A Single Doubt (AUS) 2001	Redoute's Choice (AUS); 1996	Danehill	Razyana
Sire Not A Single Doubt (AUS) 2001	Redoute's Choice (AUS); 1996	Shanthas Choice	Canny Lad
Sire Not A Single Doubt (AUS) 2001	Redoute's Choice (AUS); 1996	Shanthas Choice	Dancing Show
Sire Not A Single Doubt (AUS) 2001	Singles Bar (AUS); 1991	Rory's Jester	Crown Jester
Sire Not A Single Doubt (AUS) 2001	Singles Bar (AUS); 1991	Rory's Jester	Rory's Rocket
Sire Not A Single Doubt (AUS) 2001	Singles Bar (AUS); 1991	Easy Date	Grand Chaudiere
Sire Not A Single Doubt (AUS) 2001	Singles Bar (AUS); 1991	Easy Date	Scampering
Dam Tallow (AUS) 2006	Street Cry (IRE); 1998	Machiavellian	Mr. Prospector
Dam Tallow (AUS) 2006	Street Cry (IRE); 1998	Machiavellian	Coup de Folie
Dam Tallow (AUS) 2006	Street Cry (IRE); 1998	Helen Street	Troy
Dam Tallow (AUS) 2006	Street Cry (IRE); 1998	Helen Street	Waterway
Dam Tallow (AUS) 2006	African Queen (AUS); 1999	Lion Hunter	Danehill
Dam Tallow (AUS) 2006	African Queen (AUS); 1999	Lion Hunter	Pure of Heart
Dam Tallow (AUS) 2006	African Queen (AUS); 1999	Creola	Palace Music
Dam Tallow (AUS) 2006	African Queen (AUS); 1999	Creola	Salamore
