= Not A Single Doubt =

Australian Thoroughbred racehorse

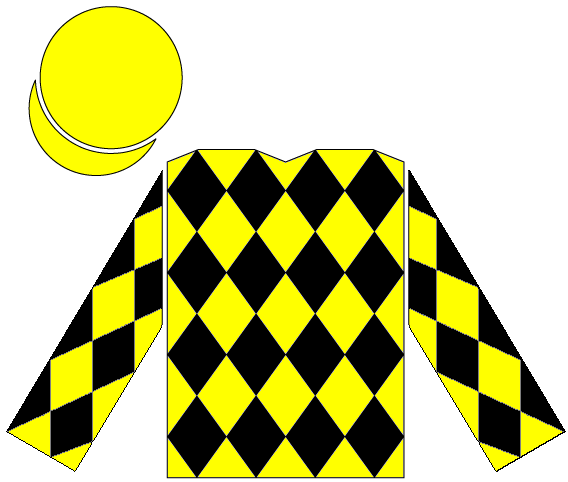
- Racing silks of Arrowfield
- Sire: Redoute's Choice
- Grandsire: Danehill
- Dam: Singles Bar
- Damsire: Rory's Jester
- Sex: Colt
- Foaled: 1 October 2001
- Died: 27 June 2022 (aged 20)
- Country: Australia
- Colour: Bay
- Breeder: Arrowleave Joint Venture
- Owner: Arrowfield Pastoral, R S & O Finemore, Planette Thoroughbreds, Belford Productions, Teeley Assets
- Trainer: Graeme Rogerson (2003-2004); Tony Vasil (2005)
- Record: 10: 4–2–0
- Earnings: A$ 392,000

Major wins
- Canonbury Stakes (2003); Zeditave Stakes (2005)

Not A Single Doubt (1 October 2001 – 27 June 2022) was an Australian thoroughbred racehorse and successful stallion, having sired over 70 individual stakes winners.

== Background ==
A first-crop son and the first stakes winner of champion sire Redoute's Choice, Not A Single Doubt was homebred at Arrowfield Stud and is by the mare, Singles Bar, a daughter of Rory's Jester.

== Racing career ==
=== 2003/04: two-year-old season ===
Originally trained by Graeme Rogerson at Randwick Racecourse, Not A Single Doubt won his first three starts by a combined 9 lengths including the Canonbury Stakes and the inaugural Strawberry Hill Slipper Stakes at Wyong where he set a new course record time. On the strength of these performances, Not A Single Doubt started a short priced favourite for the 2YO Magic Millions Classic however ran second behind that seasons Australian Champion Two Year Old, Dance Hero. Not A Single Doubt's campaign was cut short after the Todman Stakes due to a soft tissue injury in his off-fore leg and he would not race again for another ten months.

=== 2004/05: three-year old season ===
Not A Single Doubt was transferred to Melbourne trainer Tony Vasil. Majority owner John Messara explained, “We would like to make a stallion out of Not A Single Doubt, he is a speed horse, we believe Victoria offers an excellent suite of sprint races in the autumn."

Not A Single Doubt only had one more victory before being retired to stud when successful in the Zeditave Stakes when ridden by Kerrin McEvoy.

== Stud career ==
Not A Single Doubt commenced stud duties at Arrowfield Stud in 2005 for a service fee of A$13,750.

In 2020 it was announced by John Messara that Not A Single Doubt had been retired from active stud duty due to pulmonary disease. At the time of his retirement his service fee had increased to a career high A$110,000. Messara stated, "Not A Single Doubt is a wonderful story for Arrowfield and for many breeders, owners, buyers and trainers, rising from the bottom of our roster to become one of Australia’s most popular and successful stallions. We are immensely grateful to him, and he will be loved and cared for at Arrowfield for the rest of his life."

=== Death ===
Not A Single Doubt was euthanised on June 27, 2022, due to a progressive lung disease.

=== Notable progeny ===
Not A Single Doubt has sired 15 individual Group 1 winners:

c = colt, f = filly, g = gelding

Foaled	Name	Sex	Major wins
2010	Miracles Of Life	f	Blue Diamond Stakes, Robert Sangster Stakes
2011	Clearly Innocent	g	Kingsford-Smith Cup
2011	Good Project	c	Railway Stakes
2012	Scales Of Justice	g	Railway Stakes, Memsie Stakes
2012	Secret Agenda	f	Robert Sangster Stakes
2012	Single Gaze	f	Vinery Stud Stakes
2012	Southern Legend	g	Champions Mile
2013	Extreme Choice	c	Blue Diamond Stakes, A J Moir Stakes
2013	Kenedna	f	Queen of the Turf Stakes, Doomben Cup
2013	Samadoubt	g	Winx Stakes,
2014	Mighty Boss	c	Caulfield Guineas
2015	Qafila	f	South Australian Derby
2016	Shout The Bar	f	Vinery Stud Stakes, Empire Rose Stakes
2016	Stronger	c	Centenary Sprint Cup
2017	Farnan	c	Golden Slipper
2017	Instant Celebrity	f	Robert Sangster Stakes

== Pedigree ==
Pedigree of Not A Single Doubt (AUS) 2001
Sire Redoute's Choice (AUS) 1996	Danehill (USA); 1986	Danzig (USA); 1977	Northern Dancer (CAN); 1961
Sire Redoute's Choice (AUS) 1996	Danehill (USA); 1986	Danzig (USA); 1977	Pas de Nom (USA); 1967
Sire Redoute's Choice (AUS) 1996	Danehill (USA); 1986	Razyana (USA); 1981	His Majesty (USA); 1968
Sire Redoute's Choice (AUS) 1996	Danehill (USA); 1986	Razyana (USA); 1981	Spring Adieu (CAN); 1974
Sire Redoute's Choice (AUS) 1996	Shantha's Choice (AUS); 1992	Canny Lad (AUS); 1987	Bletchingly (AUS); 1970
Sire Redoute's Choice (AUS) 1996	Shantha's Choice (AUS); 1992	Canny Lad (AUS); 1987	Jesmond Lass (AUS); 1975
Sire Redoute's Choice (AUS) 1996	Shantha's Choice (AUS); 1992	Dancing Show (USA); 1983	Nijinsky II (CAN); 1967
Sire Redoute's Choice (AUS) 1996	Shantha's Choice (AUS); 1992	Dancing Show (USA); 1983	Show Lady (USA); 1976
Dam Singles Bar (AUS) 1991	Rory's Jester (AUS); 1982	Crown Jester (AUS); 1978	Baguette (AUS); 1967
Dam Singles Bar (AUS) 1991	Rory's Jester (AUS); 1982	Crown Jester (AUS); 1978	Anjudy (AUS); 1969
Dam Singles Bar (AUS) 1991	Rory's Jester (AUS); 1982	Rory's Rocket (ENG); 1973	Roan Rocket (GB); 1961
Dam Singles Bar (AUS) 1991	Rory's Jester (AUS); 1982	Rory's Rocket (ENG); 1973	Cantadora (ENG); 1964
Dam Singles Bar (AUS) 1991	Easy Date (AUS); 1977	Grand Chaudiere (USA); 1968	Northern Dancer (CAN); 1971
Dam Singles Bar (AUS) 1991	Easy Date (AUS); 1977	Grand Chaudiere (USA); 1968	Lachine II (GB); 1960
Dam Singles Bar (AUS) 1991	Easy Date (AUS); 1977	Scampering (AUS); 1971	Misty Day (USA); 1958
Dam Singles Bar (AUS) 1991	Easy Date (AUS); 1977	Scampering (AUS); 1971	Scamper Away (USA); 1966
