= Tagaloa (horse) =

Australian Thoroughbred racehorse

- Sire: Lord Kanaloa
- Grandsire: King Kamehameha
- Dam: Vasilissa
- Damsire: Heart's Cry
- Sex: Colt
- Foaled: 9 September 2017
- Country: Australia
- Colour: Bay
- Breeder: Arrowfield Stud
- Owner: A Kheir, Yu Long Investments, A Latassa, DP & SH Juratowitch, JCL See, NK Stuart, JR Clancy, CE Gilder, SA Lewin, TM Scales, RT & BA Secatore, A Terluk, TE Woodman, SL Curran, G Ohehir, JA O'Neill, V Kheir
- Trainer: Trent Busuttin & Natalie Young
- Record: 13: 3–1–4
- Earnings: A$ 1,469,450

Major wins
- Blue Diamond Stakes (2020); C S Hayes Stakes (2021)

Tagaloa (foaled 9 September 2017) is a Group 1 winning Australian thoroughbred racehorse.

== Background ==
Bred by the thoroughbred stud farm Arrowfield Stud, Tagaloa is a product of two of Japanese stallions. He was sired by Japan’s most expensive stallion, Lord Kanaloa and is out of a daughter by Sunday Silence’s champion son Heart's Cry. Tagaloa was purchased by Busuttin Racing for $300,000 out of the Arrowfield Stud draft at the 2019 Magic Millions Yearling Sale.

== Racing career ==
=== 2019/20: two-year-old season ===
Tagaloa first raced in the Maribyrnong Plate as a 2 year old and came in third place. He won his next start at Moonee Valley Racecourse. Connections opted against racing him in the Magic Millions Classic and sent the horse instead for a break, with the aim being to run in the Blue Diamond Stakes. Co-trainer Trent Busuttin said after his Moonee Valley success, "He’s certainly a very promising, nice young horse. He’ll be aimed up towards a Blue Diamond Prelude and the Blue Diamond if he’s good enough.”

Tagaloa finished 4th in the Blue Diamond Prelude C&G and two weeks later started a 25/1 outsider in the Blue Diamond Stakes. Ridden by Michael Walker, the horse was caught three deep during the race and was there to be beaten at the furlong when challenged by the favourite, Hanseatic, who had enjoyed a charmed run under jockey Tim Clark. However, Tagaloa was up for the fight and stayed on to defeat Hanseatic by a head margin.

Tagaloa then continued racing in Sydney. After finishing second in the Todman Stakes behind the Gai Waterhouse trained Farnan, Tagaloa started as a 9/2 second favourite in the Golden Slipper Stakes but was beaten four lengths by Farnan again. After the race jockey Michael Walker said, “He ran super. He ran really really good. He peaked for a Blue Diamond. For a horse of his class to come back and still run fourth in a Golden Slipper is tremendous.”

=== 2020/21: three-year-old season ===
Tagaloa resumed racing on the 29 August 2020 in the HDF McNeil Stakes at Caulfield. He finished in third position in a three way photo finish.

After unplaced runs in both the Sir Rupert Clarke Stakes and Caulfield Guineas, Tagaloa was spelled until he resumed racing on the 30 January where he finished third in the Manfred Stakes beaten under a length.

On the 13 February he contested the C S Hayes Stakes at Flemington. Starting at odds of 10/1, Tagaloa settled outside the leader throughout the run and surged to the line to win by a margin of 1 length.

Following a third placing in the Australian Guineas and an unplaced effort in the All Aged Stakes, Tagaloa was retired from racing to commence stud duties as a stallion.

== Stud career ==
Tagaloa stands as a sire at Yulong Stud in Victoria for a service fee of $33,000.
