= China Horse Club =

Thoroughbred racing and breeding operation

China Horse Club (CHC) is a thoroughbred racing and breeding operation. It has won high-profile races in Australia, Britain, France, Ireland, New Zealand, Singapore and the United States.

Among the best known racehorses it has owned in are 2018 American Triple Crown winner Justify; Kentucky Oaks winner Abel Tasman; Derby Stakes winner Australia; Life Is Good (Breeders' Cup Dirt Mile); State Of Rest (2022 Prince of Wales's Stakes); multiple G1 winner Militarize; and Golden Slipper winner Stay Inside.

Among the best known racehorses it has bred are Saffron Beach; Ozzmosis; Kimari; Valiance; Saudi Crown; Communist; and Johannes Vermeer who it bred in partnership with Coolmore Stud.

== Background ==
China Horse Club commenced racing operations in 2013 under the leadership of chairman Teo Ah Khing and Founding General Manager Eden Harrington. It has an expansive international partnership network that includes WinStar Farm, Newgate Farm, SF Bloodstock, Blake Sandblom Pty Ltd, Coolmore Stud, Sir Owen Glenn’s Go Bloodstock, Ballylinch Stud, Qatar Racing, David Howden; Vinery Stud, Widden Stud, Trilogy Racing, Taylor Made Farm, Aga Khan Studs, Cressfield Stud and Yarraman Park Stud.

Racehorses owned by CHC have won:

=== Australia ===
- Australian Champion Racehorse of the Year (2014-2015 Dissident)
- Australian Champion Two Year Old (2020-2021 Stay Inside)
- Australian Champion Sprinter (2014-2015 Dissident)
- NSW Horse of the Year (2014-2015 First Seal)
- NSW Champion Three Year Old (2014-2015 First Seal)
- NSW Queen of the Autumn (2014-2015 First Seal)
- Victorian Horse of the Year (2014-2015 Dissident)

=== United States ===
Eclipse Awards

- American Horse of the Year (2018 Justify)
- American Champion Three-Year-Old Male Horse (2018 Justify)
- American Champion Three-Year-Old Filly (2017 Abel Tasman)
- American Champion Older Dirt Male Horse (2020 Improbable)

=== New Zealand ===
- Champion Three Year Old (2018/2019 Madison County)

== Major wins ==
Australia

- Golden Slipper – Stay Inside (2021)
- Coolmore Stud Stakes – Ozzmosis (2023)
- Golden Rose – In The Congo (2021) Militarize (2023)
- Sires Produce Stakes (ATC) – Pride of Dubai (2015) Invader (2017) Militarize (2023)
- Champagne Stakes (ATC) – Captivant (2021) Militarize (2023)
- Caulfield Guineas – Press Statement (2015)
- Randwick Guineas – Communist (2023)
- Flight Stakes – First Seal (2014)
- Canterbury Stakes – Artorius (2023)
- All Aged Stakes – Dissident (2015)
- C.F. Orr Stakes – Dissident (2015)
- Memsie Stakes – Dissident (2014)
- Makybe Diva Stakes – Dissident (2014)
- The Galaxy – Russian Revolution (2017)
- Oakleigh Plate – Russian Revolution (2018)
- A J Moir Stakes – Extreme Choice (2016) Wild Ruler (2021)

(United Kingdom) England

- Derby – Australia (2014)
- International Stakes – Australia (2014)
- Prince of Wales's Stakes – State Of Rest (2022)

France

- Prix Ganay – State Of Rest (2022)
- Criterium International – Johannes Vermeer (2015)

(Republic of Ireland) Ireland

- Irish Derby – Australia (2014)

New Zealand

- New Zealand 2000 Guineas – Madison County (2018)
- Levin Classic – Madison County (2019)

Singapore

- Singapore Gold Cup – Tropaios (2013)
- CECF Singapore Cup – Parranda (2015)

United States

- Kentucky Derby – Justify (2018)
- Kentucky Oaks – Abel Tasman (2017)
- Breeders' Cup Dirt Mile – Life Is Good (2021)
- Pegasus World Cup – Life Is Good (2022)
- Preakness Stakes – Justify (2018)
- Belmont Stakes – Justify (2018)
- Whitney Stakes – Improbable (2020) Life Is Good (2022)
- Hollywood Gold Cup – Improbable (2020)
- Awesome Again Stakes – Improbable (2020)
- Woodward Stakes – Yoshida (2018) Life Is Good (2022)
- Florida Derby – Audible (2018) Tappan Street (2025)
- Santa Anita Derby – Justify (2018)
- Frizette Stakes – Yellow Agate (2016)
- Acorn Stakes – Abel Tasman (2017)
- American Oaks – Abel Tasman (2017)
- Turf Classic Stakes – Yoshida (2018)
- Ogden Phipps Stakes – Abel Tasman (2018)
- Personal Ensign Stakes – Abel Tasman (2018)
- Los Alamitos Futurity – Improbable (2018)
- Spinster Stakes – Valiance (2020)
- Cigar Mile Handicap – Americanrevolution (2021)

== China Horse Club Breeding (G1 Graduates) ==
Australia

- Ozzmosis – Coolmore Stud Stakes
- Communist – Randwick Guineas

(United Kingdom) England

- Saffron Beach – Sun Chariot Stakes

France

- Saffron Beach – Prix Rothschild
- Johannes Vermeer (in partnership with Coolmore Stud) - Criterium International

United States

- Valiance – Spinster Stakes
- Kimari – Madison Stakes
- Saudi Crown – Pennsylvania Derby
