= Stay Inside (horse) =

Australian thoroughbred racehorse

- Sire: Extreme Choice
- Grandsire: Not A Single Doubt
- Dam: Nothin Leica Storm
- Damsire: Anabaa
- Sex: Colt
- Foaled: 23 August 2018
- Country: Australia
- Colour: Bay
- Breeder: Kingstar Farm
- Owner: Newgate Farm et al.
- Trainer: Richard & Michael Freedman
- Record: 6: 3-0-0
- Earnings: AU$2,247,600

Major wins
- Golden Slipper (2021)

Awards
- Australian Champion Two Year Old (2021)

Stay Inside (foaled 23 August 2018) is an Australian thoroughbred racehorse that is most notable for winning the 2021 Golden Slipper.

== Background ==
Stay Inside was purchased for A$200,000 at the 2019 Magic Millions yearling sale.

== Racing career ==
Stay Inside made his debut on the 23 January 2021 at Randwick in a 2YO handicap. After being heavily supported in betting markets, Stay Inside firmed from odds of 11/1 into 6/1 and won comfortably by almost 3 lengths.

On the 13 February 2021, Stay Inside started the 5/4 favourite in the Pierro Plate at Randwick Racecourse and won by a margin of 4 lengths.

Stay Inside then finished unplaced in the Todman Stakes behind Anamoe, before winning the Golden Slipper three weeks later, defeating Anamoe by almost 2 lengths.

Stay Inside had two runs as a three-year-old, finishing unplaced both times in the San Domenico Stakes and The Run To The Rose. He was retired from racing to commence stallion duties in 2022.

== Stud career ==
Stay Inside commenced stallion duties at Newgate Farm in 2022 at a service fee of A$77,000.

== Pedigree ==
Pedigree of Stay Inside (AUS) 2018
| Sire Extreme Choice (AUS) 2013 | Not A Single Doubt (AUS); 2001 | Redoute's Choice | Danehill |
| Sire Extreme Choice (AUS) 2013 | Not A Single Doubt (AUS); 2001 | Redoute's Choice | Shanthas Choice |
| Sire Extreme Choice (AUS) 2013 | Not A Single Doubt (AUS); 2001 | Singles Bar | Rory's Jester |
| Sire Extreme Choice (AUS) 2013 | Not A Single Doubt (AUS); 2001 | Singles Bar | Easy Date |
| Sire Extreme Choice (AUS) 2013 | Extremely (AUS); 2005 | Hussonet | Mr. Prospector |
| Sire Extreme Choice (AUS) 2013 | Extremely (AUS); 2005 | Hussonet | Sacahuista |
| Sire Extreme Choice (AUS) 2013 | Extremely (AUS); 2005 | Going To Extremes | Nasty And Bold |
| Sire Extreme Choice (AUS) 2013 | Extremely (AUS); 2005 | Going To Extremes | Ole Bow Wower |
| Dam Nothin Leica Storm (AUS) 2007 | Anabaa (USA); 1992 | Danzig | Northern Dancer |
| Dam Nothin Leica Storm (AUS) 2007 | Anabaa (USA); 1992 | Danzig | Pas De Nom |
| Dam Nothin Leica Storm (AUS) 2007 | Anabaa (USA); 1992 | Balbonella | Gay Mecene |
| Dam Nothin Leica Storm (AUS) 2007 | Anabaa (USA); 1992 | Balbonella | Bamieres |
| Dam Nothin Leica Storm (AUS) 2007 | Nothin' Leica (AUS); 1999 | Nothin' Leica Dane | Danehill |
| Dam Nothin Leica Storm (AUS) 2007 | Nothin' Leica (AUS); 1999 | Nothin' Leica Dane | Leica Pretender |
| Dam Nothin Leica Storm (AUS) 2007 | Nothin' Leica (AUS); 1999 | El Rello | Cerreto |
| Dam Nothin Leica Storm (AUS) 2007 | Nothin' Leica (AUS); 1999 | El Rello | Pastel |
