= Shinzo (horse) =

Australian thoroughbred racehorse

- Racing colours of Coolmore
- Sire: Snitzel
- Grandsire: Redoute's Choice
- Dam: Samaready
- Damsire: More Than Ready
- Sex: Colt
- Foaled: 26 August 2020 (age 5)
- Country: Australia
- Colour: Bay
- Breeder: Katom
- Owner: Coolmore, Wynaus, Westerberg, Mr J Poulin, Sir P J Vela, Chris Waller Racing, Lynque, Woppitt Bloodstock, Peachester Lodge Pty Ltd, Mr K J Pooley, Mrs J L Pooley, Rockingham Thoroughbreds, Mr R McClure
- Trainer: Chris Waller
- Record: 4: 2-1-0
- Earnings: A$3,018,250

Major wins
- Pago Pago Stakes (2023); Golden Slipper (2023)

Awards
- Australian Champion Two Year Old (2023)

Shinzo (foaled 26 August 2020) is a Group 1 winning Australian Thoroughbred racehorse who is most notable for winning the 2023 Golden Slipper.

== Background ==
Shinzo was foaled and raised at Coolmore and is by dual Group 1 winning mare Samaready. Samaready was bought by Coolmore in 2020 for $1.8million at the Inglis Chairman's Sale when she was carrying Shinzo in utero.

== Racing career ==
Shinzo made his race debut on 25 January 2023 in the Canonbury Stakes when finishing in third position.

After finishing second at his next start in the Skyline Stakes, Shinzo then won the Pago Pago Stakes with jockey James McDonald on board. This victory assured the horse a start in the Golden Slipper just seven days later.

On 18 March 2023, Shinzo started at odds of $16/1 in the Golden Slipper at Rosehill. Ridden by Ryan Moore, Shinzo settled midfield in the run before getting a rails run to win by 1¼ lengths. The victory was trainer Chris Waller's first win in the race. It also gave Waller the final leg of Australian racing's “Grand-Slam” having won the big 4 races; the Melbourne Cup, the Caulfield Cup, Cox Plate and the Golden Slipper.

== Pedigree ==
Pedigree of Shinzo (AUS) 2020
Sire Snitzel (AUS) 2002	Redoute's Choice (AUS); 1996	Danehill	Danzig
Sire Snitzel (AUS) 2002	Redoute's Choice (AUS); 1996	Danehill	Razyana
Sire Snitzel (AUS) 2002	Redoute's Choice (AUS); 1996	Shanthas Choice	Canny Lad
Sire Snitzel (AUS) 2002	Redoute's Choice (AUS); 1996	Shanthas Choice	Dancing Show
Sire Snitzel (AUS) 2002	Snippets Lass' (AUS); 1993	Snippets	Lunchtime
Sire Snitzel (AUS) 2002	Snippets Lass' (AUS); 1993	Snippets	Easy Date
Sire Snitzel (AUS) 2002	Snippets Lass' (AUS); 1993	Snow Finch	Storm Bird
Sire Snitzel (AUS) 2002	Snippets Lass' (AUS); 1993	Snow Finch	A Realgirl
Dam Samaready (AUS) 2009	More Than Ready (USA); 1997	Southern Halo	Halo
Dam Samaready (AUS) 2009	More Than Ready (USA); 1997	Southern Halo	Northern Sea
Dam Samaready (AUS) 2009	More Than Ready (USA); 1997	Woodmans Girl	Woodman
Dam Samaready (AUS) 2009	More Than Ready (USA); 1997	Woodmans Girl	Becky Be Good
Dam Samaready (AUS) 2009	Samar (AUS); 1999	Secret Savings	Seeking The Gold
Dam Samaready (AUS) 2009	Samar (AUS); 1999	Secret Savings	Jurisdictional
Dam Samaready (AUS) 2009	Samar (AUS); 1999	Nice Choice	Touching Wood
Dam Samaready (AUS) 2009	Samar (AUS); 1999	Nice Choice	Dubai Spring
