= Snitzel (horse) =

Australian Thoroughbred racehorse

- Sire: Redoute's Choice
- Grandsire: Danehill
- Dam: Snippets' Lass
- Damsire: Snippets
- Sex: Stallion
- Foaled: 24 August 2002
- Died: 11 June 2025 (aged 22)
- Country: Australia
- Colour: Bay
- Breeder: F Naude
- Owner: Arrowfield Stud
- Trainer: Gerald Ryan
- Record: 15: 7–1–3
- Earnings: A$ 1,031,500

Major wins
- Breeders' Plate (2004); Tommy Smith Slipper (2004); Skyline Stakes (2005); Up and Coming Stakes (2005); Oakleigh Plate (2006); Challenge Stakes (2006)

Awards
- Australian Champion Sire (2016, 2017, 2018, 2019, 2025)

Snitzel (24 August 2002 - 11 June 2025) was a Group 1 winning Australian thoroughbred racehorse and successful stallion, having sired over 100 individual stakes winners.

== Background ==
Bred by Francois Naude from the stakes-winning Snippets mare Snippets’ Lass, Snitzel was purchased for A$260,000 by his trainer Gerald Ryan for owners Damion and Camilla Flower at the 2004 Magic Millions Gold Coast Sale.

== Racing career ==
=== 2004/05: two-year-old season ===
Snitzel won his first three starts as a spring 2YO, including the Listed Breeders' Plate, and progressed to win the Skyline Stakes in February 2005. Snitzel started the short priced favourite for the 2YO Magic Millions Classic and Golden Slipper Stakes however he was unsuccessful in both races.

=== 2005/06: three-year old season ===
Snitzel tasted Group 1 success as a three-year-old when successful in the Oakleigh Plate at the odds of 10/1. He was retired to stud duties after Arrowfield Stud purchased a significant ownership share in the horse. At the time of his retirement, Snitzel had won 7 races and over $1 million in prizemoney.

== Stud career ==
Snitzel has proven to be one of Australia's most successful and expensive stallions with his service fee being in the Top 10 worldwide, being in 2018 a total of $220,000 per service.

Stud fees: Snitzel has stood exclusively at Arrowfield Stud in New South Wales. His service fee progression has been $33,000 (2006), $22,000 (2007), $22,000 (2008), $22,000 (2009), $27,500 (2010), $27,500 (2011), $33,000 (2012), $49,500 (2013), $71,500 (2014), $88,000 (2015), $110,000 (2016), $176,000 (2017), $220,000 (2018), $220,000 (2019), $165,000 (2020), $165,000 (2021), $220,000 (2022).

=== Notable stock ===
Snitzel has sired 28 individual Group 1 winners:

c = colt, f = filly, g = gelding

Foaled	Name	Sex	Major wins
2008	Hot Snitzel	g	BTC Cup
2009	Sizzling	c	BRC TJ Smith Stakes
2009	Snitzerland	f	Lightning Stakes
2010	Shamus Award	c	W S Cox Plate, Australian Guineas
2010	Sweet Idea	f	The Galaxy
2011	Wandjina	c	Australian Guineas
2012	Redzel	g	Doomben 10,000, Darley Classic
2013	Heavenly Blue	c	South African Classic
2013	Russian Revolution	c	The Galaxy, Oakleigh Plate
2014	I Am Excited	f	The Galaxy
2014	Invader	c	Sires' Produce Stakes
2014	Summer Passage	c	Sistema Stakes
2014	Trapeze Artist	c	Golden Rose Stakes, TJ Smith Stakes, All Aged Stakes, Canterbury Stakes
2015	Estijaab	f	Golden Slipper Stakes
2017	Wild Ruler	c	Moir Stakes
2018	Baraqiel	g	Moir Stakes
2018	In The Congo	c	Golden Rose Stakes
2018	Sword Of State	c	Sistema Stakes
2018	Yearning	f	The Thousand Guineas
2020	Shinzo	c	Golden Slipper
2021	Switzerland	c	Coolmore Stud Stakes
2021	Lady Shenandoah	f	Coolmore Classic, Surround Stakes, Flight Stakes, Toorak Handicap, Empire Rose Stakes
2021	Lazzura	f	Coolmore Classic
2022	Marhoona	f	Golden Slipper, The Galaxy
2022	Return To Conquer	c	Sistema Stakes
2023	Campione D'Italia	c	Sires' Produce Stakes (ATC)
2023	Fireball	c	Champagne Stakes
2023	The Next Episode	c	Coolmore Stud Stakes

== Death ==
Snitzel began to show signs of age-related decline in 2024 and on 11 June 2025 was euthanised with no treatment options left available.

== Pedigree ==
Pedigree of Snitzel (AUS)
Sire Redoute's Choice (AUS) 1996	Danehill (USA); 1986	Danzig (USA); 1977	Northern Dancer (CAN); 1971
Sire Redoute's Choice (AUS) 1996	Danehill (USA); 1986	Danzig (USA); 1977	Pas de Nom (USA); 1968
Sire Redoute's Choice (AUS) 1996	Danehill (USA); 1986	Razyana (USA); 1981	His Majesty (USA); 1968
Sire Redoute's Choice (AUS) 1996	Danehill (USA); 1986	Razyana (USA); 1981	Spring Adieu (CAN); 1974
Sire Redoute's Choice (AUS) 1996	Shantha's Choice (AUS); 1992	Canny Lad (AUS); 1987	Bletchingly (AUS); 1970
Sire Redoute's Choice (AUS) 1996	Shantha's Choice (AUS); 1992	Canny Lad (AUS); 1987	Jesmond Lass (AUS); 1975
Sire Redoute's Choice (AUS) 1996	Shantha's Choice (AUS); 1992	Dancing Show (USA); 1983	Nijinsky II (CAN); 1967
Sire Redoute's Choice (AUS) 1996	Shantha's Choice (AUS); 1992	Dancing Show (USA); 1983	Show Lady (USA); 1976
Dam Snippets' Lass (AUS) 1993	Snippets (AUS); 1984	Lunchtime (GB); 1970	Silly Season (USA); 1962
Dam Snippets' Lass (AUS) 1993	Snippets (AUS); 1984	Lunchtime (GB); 1970	Great Occasion (GB); 1965
Dam Snippets' Lass (AUS) 1993	Snippets (AUS); 1984	Easy Date (AUS); 1977	Grand Chaudiere (USA); 1968
Dam Snippets' Lass (AUS) 1993	Snippets (AUS); 1984	Easy Date (AUS); 1977	Scampering (AUS); 1971
Dam Snippets' Lass (AUS) 1993	Snow Finch (IRE); 1984	Storm Bird (CAN); 1978	Northern Dancer (CAN); 1971
Dam Snippets' Lass (AUS) 1993	Snow Finch (IRE); 1984	Storm Bird (CAN); 1978	South Ocean (CAN); 1967
Dam Snippets' Lass (AUS) 1993	Snow Finch (IRE); 1984	A Realgirl (USA); 1976	In Reality (USA); 1964
Dam Snippets' Lass (AUS) 1993	Snow Finch (IRE); 1984	A Realgirl (USA); 1976	Secret Verdict (USA); 1966
