= Capitalist (horse) =

Australian Thoroughbred racehorse

- Sire: Written Tycoon
- Grandsire: Inglesia
- Dam: Kitalpha
- Damsire: Fusaichi Pegasus
- Sex: Stallion
- Foaled: 14 September 2013
- Country: Australia
- Colour: Chestnut
- Owner: James Harron Bloodstock et al
- Trainer: Peter and Paul Snowden
- Record: 7-4-1-1
- Earnings: A$3,545,900

Major wins
- Magic Millions Classic (2016); Golden Slipper Stakes (G1)(2016)

Awards
- Australian Champion Two Year Old (2016)

Capitalist (foaled 14 September 2013) is a retired Thoroughbred racehorse and active sire trained and bred in Australia. He won the Golden Slipper Stakes, a Group One race. He amassed over three million dollars in winnings.

== Background ==
Capitalist was purchased for $165,000 at the Magic Millions yearling sales from the Daandine Stud in Queensland early in 2015. He had his first trial on 21 September 2015.

== Racing career ==
On 3 October 2015, Capitalist competed in the listed Breeders' Plate at Randwick Racecourse, winning by 3 lengths over 1000 metres. He was said to have "toyed with his opposition" as he, "streaked away." Trainer Peter Snowden said, "He was travelling like a winner a long way out and put paid to them in a few strides without being put under any real pressure."

After a short spell, Capitalist returned to win the Magic Millions Wyong, a lead-in race to the Magic Millions Classic. Starting as a short-priced favourite, he won by over 2 lengths, collecting $124,000 in prize money.

Capitalist was again $1.40 favourite when he raced in the Magic Millions Classic for 2-year-olds in January 2016. Despite some early trouble on the fence, he kicked in the straight to win easily and collect $1,205,000 prize money. Jockey Blake Shinn said, "It was tight, very tight. I thought for a second I was going up the fence, but he just held his position, that was it. That is his greatest asset – his attitude and speed."

Capitalist then had a freshen before contesting the Group 2 Todman Stakes in March. Again a short-priced favourite, he was the 2nd placed of the four horses in the race, finishing behind the Gai Waterhouse-trained Kiss And Make Up. A post-race vet examination showed the horse to be mildly sore. Capitalist's sire, Written Tycoon, had won the same race in 2005.

Capitalist next contested the Golden Slipper, the world's richest race for two-year-olds. After the previous loss, he was paying $8, the first time in his short career that he had not been favourite. With Extreme Choice badly missing the start, Capitalist won the race by half a length over Yankee Rose. Shinn said, "We never wrote this horse off after his last start defeat. You just have to have the faith and go in confident to every race. This is the best feeling ever. It is one of the greatest races in the world and to be able to win it, I can't thank everyone enough."

After a 147-day spell, Capitalist trialed twice before failing to place in the San Domenico Stakes on 13 August 2016. He had a freshen and another trial and then placed 3rd in the Group 2 Roman Consul Stakes.

== Stud record ==
Capitalist was officially retired to stud at Newgate Farm in November 2016, having chipped a fetlock in training. Manager there, Henry Field, said, "Australia is all about two-year-old racing, and to have a champion two-year-old standing at Newgate is what everyone strives for. Capitalist is the embodiment of what works in Australia - he will be heavily supported by his group of owners."

He was described as "Australia’s busiest covering sire of 2017" when he served 229 mares for a fee of $55,000.

=== Notable progeny ===
Group 1 winners:

c = colt, f = filly, g = gelding

| Foaled | Name | Sex | Major wins |
| 2018 | Captivant | c | Champagne Stakes |
| 2021 | Reserve Bank | c | The Goodwood |
