= Australian Champion Two Year Old =

The Australian Champion Two Year Old is awarded annually to the two-year-old Thoroughbred horse whose performances in Australia are deemed to be the most impressive throughout each racing season. It has been awarded at the conclusion of each racing season since 1994.

Australian Champion Two Year Old
Year / Season	Horse	Sex	Breeding
2024-2025	Marhoona	Filly	Snitzel-Salma
2023-2024	Broadsiding	Colt	Too Darn Hot - Speedway
2022-2023	Shinzo	Colt	Snitzel - Samaready
2021-2022	Fireburn	Filly	Rebel Dane - Mull Over
2020-2021	Stay Inside	Colt	Extreme Choice - Nothin Leica Storm
2019-2020	Farnan	Colt	Not A Single Doubt - Tallow
2018-2019	Microphone	Colt	Exceed And Excel - Sung
2017-2018	Estijaab	Filly	Snitzel - Response
2016-2017	She Will Reign	Filly	Manhattan Rain - Courgette
2015-2016	Capitalist	Colt	Written Tycoon - Kitalpha
2013-2014	Earthquake	Colt	Exceed And Excel - Cataclysm
2012-2013	Overreach	Filly	Exceed And Excel - Bahia
2011-2012	Pierro	Colt	Lonhro - Miss Right Note
2010-2011	Sepoy	Colt	Elusive Quality (USA) - Watchful
2009-2010	Crystal Lily	Filly	Stratum - Crystal Snip
2008-2009	Phelan Ready	Gelding	More Than Ready - Nancy Eleanor
2007-2008	Sebring	Colt	More Than Ready - Purespeed
2006-2007	Meurice	Colt	Strategic - Espadon
2005-2006	Miss Finland	Filly	Redoute's Choice - Forest Pearl
2004-2005	Fashions Afield	Filly	Redoute's Choice - Attire
2003-2004	Dance Hero	Gelding	Danzero - Gypsy Dancer
2002-2003	Hasna	Filly	Snippets - They Say
2001-2002	Victory Vein	Filly	Mr Henrysee - Protective
2000-2001	Viscount	Colt	Quest for Fame - Antwerp
1999-2000	Assertive Lad	Gelding	Zedative - Sommes Sound
1998-1999	Catbird	Colt	Danehill - Fitting
1997-1998	Dracula	Colt	Quest for Fame - Awards Ceremony
1996-1997	Encounter	Colt	Tierce - Fancy Babe
1995-1996	Merlene	Filly	Danehill - Bold Promise
1994-1995	Octagonal (NZ)	Colt	Zabeel - Eight Carat

== Other Australian Thoroughbred awards ==
Australian Champion Racehorse of the Year
Australian Champion Three Year Old
Australian Champion Sprinter
Australian Champion Middle Distance Racehorse
Australian Champion Stayer
Australian Champion Filly or Mare
Australian Champion International Performer
Australian Champion Jumper
Australian Champion Trainer
