= Miss Finland (horse) =

Australian-bred Thoroughbred racehorse (2003–2026)

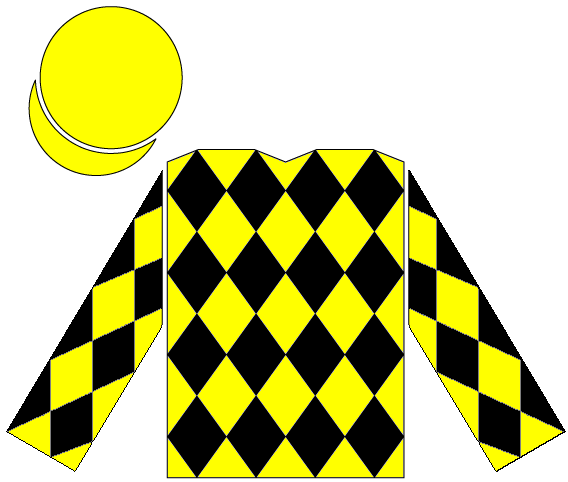
- Racing colours of Arrowfield Stud
- Sire: Redoute's Choice
- Grandsire: Danehill
- Dam: Forest Pearl
- Damsire: Woodman
- Sex: Mare
- Foaled: 16 February, 2003
- Died: 13 February, 2026 (age 22)
- Country: Australia
- Colour: Bay
- Breeder: Gainsborough Stud Australia
- Owner: Arrowfield Group Pty Ltd
- Trainer: David Hayes
- Record: 26:11-5-1
- Earnings: $4,632,775

Major wins
- Golden Slipper Stakes (2006); The Thousand Guineas (2006); Crown Oaks (2006); Australian Guineas (2007); Arrowfield Stakes (2007); Memsie Stakes (2007)

Awards
- Australian Champion Two Year Old (2006); Australian Champion Three Year Old (2007)

Miss Finland (16 February 2003 – 13 February 2026) was a champion Australian Thoroughbred racehorse. She was a bay mare sired by Redoute's Choice out of Forest Pearl, who was a daughter of The Oaks winner Moonshell.

Miss Finland was trained by top South Australian trainer David Hayes. At the age of two years, she won the AAMI Golden Slipper, the world's richest juvenile race, which is run over 1,200 metres, and ran second in the Blue Diamond Stakes. As a three-year-old, her stellar form continued, which saw her win the Crown VRC Oaks, run over 2,500 metres at Flemington during the Melbourne Cup Carnival, as well as further Group One wins in the Thousand Guineas, Australian Guineas and Arrowfield Stud Stakes. She resumed as a four-year-old with a win in the Memsie Stakes, which was to be her only win in nine starts that season before retirement.

She came from the Northern Dancer sire line and had a double cross of him in the fourth generation of her pedigree.

Miss Finland was named the "SPORTSMAN 2006 Horse of the Year". Upon retiring, she resided at Arrowfield Stud in the upper Hunter Region of New South Wales and produced 12 foals. She died from a chronic respiratory disease on 13 February 2026.
