= Chairman's Stakes =

Chairman's Stakes may refer to:

- Chairman's Stakes (MRC), of the Melbourne Racing Club
- Chairman's Stakes (SAJC), of the South Australian Jockey Club
