= Pago Pago Stakes =

- Class: Group 3
- Location: Rosehill Racecourse
- Inaugurated: 1978
- Race type: Thoroughbred - flat
- Sponsor: TAB (2024-26)

Race information
- Distance: 1,200 metres
- Surface: Turf
- Track: Right-handed
- Qualification: Two-year-old colts and geldings
- Weight: Set weights 55 1/2 kg
- Purse: A$250,000 (2026)
- Bonuses: Exempt from ballot for the Golden Slipper Stakes (if nominated)

The Pago Pago Stakes is an Australian Turf Club Group 3 Thoroughbred horse race, for two-year-old colts and geldings, at set weights, over a distance of 1200 metres, held annually at Rosehill Racecourse in Sydney, Australia in March.

== History ==
The following thoroughbreds have captured the Pago Pago – Golden Slipper double:

- Inspired (1984)
- Rory's Jester (1985)
- Stratum (2005)
- Shinzo (2023).

Recent multiple winners include:

Jockeys

- James McDonald in 2016, 2019 and 2023
- Kerrin McEvoy in 2013, 2021 and 2025
- Darren Beadman in 2002, 2005 and 2007.

Trainers

- John Hawkes in 2002, 2006 and 2007 and also with Michael & Wayne Hawkes in 2012
- John O'Shea in 2009, 2015 and 2016
- Gai Waterhouse in 2001, 2010 and with Adrian Bott in 2022.

=== Name ===
The race is named after the horse Pago Pago, who as a 2YO colt won the 1963 Golden Slipper Stakes. Pago Pago from South Australia was the first interstate trained winner of the Golden Slipper.

- 1978–1984 - Pago Pago Quality Handicap
- 1985 - Pago Pago Quality Stakes
- 1986–2004 - Pago Pago Stakes
- 2005–2009 - Darley Stakes
- 2010 onwards - Pago Pago Stakes

=== Grade ===
- 1978 - Principal Race
- 1979 - Listed Race
- 1980–1986 - Group 3
- 1987–2016 - Group 2
- 2017 - Group 3

== Winners ==
The following are winners of the race.

- 2026 - Warwoven
- 2025 - Skyhook
- 2024 - Dublin Down
- 2023 - Shinzo
- 2022 - Rise Of The Masses
- 2021 - Shaquero
- 2020 - Prague
- 2019 - Cosmic Force
- 2018 - Written By
- 2017 - Single Bullet
- 2016 - Souchez
- 2015 - Tarquin
- 2014 - Time For War
- 2013 - Sidestep
- 2012 - All Too Hard
- 2011 - Salade
- 2010 - Brightexpectations
- 2009 - Tickets
- 2008 - Sidereus
- 2007 - Deferential
- 2006 - Tarleton
- 2005 - Stratum
- 2004 - Genius And Evil
- 2003 - Danbird
- 2002 - Planchet
- 2001 - Red Hannigan
- 2000 - De France
- 1999 - Shogun Lodge
- 1998 - Paris Dream
- 1997 - Encounter
- 1996 - Babu's Boy
- 1995 - Strategic
- 1994 - Lord Jim
- 1993 - Jetball
- 1992 - Yachtie
- 1991 - Big Dreams
- 1990 - Pagan Jest
- 1989 - Straussbrook
- 1988 - Zeditave
- 1987 - Christmas Tree
- 1986 - Imperial Baron
- 1985 - Rory's Jester
- 1984 - Inspired
- 1983 - Te Puninga
- 1982 - Grosvenor
- 1981 - Lead Role
- 1980 - John's Hero
- 1979 - Dawn Command
- 1978 - Cheval De Volee

== See also ==
- List of Australian Group races
- Group races
