= Zeditave Stakes =

Horse race held in Melbourne, Australia

- Class: Group 3
- Location: Caulfield Racecourse
- Inaugurated: 1989
- Race type: Thoroughbred
- Sponsor: Sportsbet (2026)

Race information
- Distance: 1,200 metres
- Surface: Turf
- Track: Left-handed
- Qualification: Three-year-old colts and geldings
- Weight: Set weights with penalties
- Purse: $200,000 (2026)

The Zeditave Stakes is a Melbourne Racing Club Group 3 Thoroughbred horse race for three-year-old colts and geldings, held with set weights with penalties conditions, over a distance of 1200 metres at Caulfield Racecourse in Melbourne, Australia in February.

== History ==
The race is named after the 1988 Blue Diamond Stakes and 1989 Futurity Stakes winner, Zeditave. Between 2005–2013 the race was run on Australia Day holiday. Since 2014 the race has been run on the Blue Diamond Stakes / Futurity Stakes racecard.

=== Name ===
- 1989 - The Peter Jackson
- 1990 onwards - Zeditave Stakes

=== Grade ===
- 1989–2013 - Listed race
- 2014 onwards - Group 3

=== Venue ===
- 1989–1993 - Caulfield Racecourse
- 1994–1996 - Sandown Racecourse
- 1997–2005 - Caulfield Racecourse
- 2006 - Sandown Racecourse
- 2007–2022 - Caulfield Racecourse
- 2023 - Sandown Racecourse

=== Conditions ===
- prior 2005 - Three-year-olds
- 2005 onwards - Three-year-old colts and geldings

== Winners ==
The following are past winners of the race.

- 2026 - Pallaton
- 2025 - Tropicus
- 2024 - Raikoke
- 2023 - Recommendation
- 2022 - Finance Tycoon
- 2021 - Oxley Road
- 2020 - He'll Haunt Us
- 2019 - Terbium
- 2018 - Overshare
- 2017 - Benz
- 2016 - Santa Ana Lane
- 2015 - Rommel
- 2014 - Not Listenin'tome
- 2013 - Happy Galaxy
- 2012 - Instinction
- 2011 - Eclair Mystic
- 2010 - Denman
- 2009 - Time Thief
- 2008 - Bundle O' Gold
- 2007 - Haradasun
- 2006 - Minson
- 2005 - Not A Single Doubt
- 2004 - St Elmo's Fire
- 2003 - Innovation Girl
- 2002 - Barkada
- 2001 - Desert Eagle
- 2000 - Pins
- 1999 - Destruction Point
- 1998 - Blaze The Turf
- 1997 - Catainer
- 1996 - Street Talk
- 1995 - Hurricane Sky
- 1994 - Superact
- 1993 - Oozook
- 1992 - My Saturn Star
- 1991 - Paklani
- 1990 - Tango Master
- 1989 - Almurtajaz

== See also ==
- List of Australian Group races
- Group races
