= Chairman's Stakes (MRC) =

- Class: Group 3
- Location: Caulfield Racecourse, Melbourne, Australia
- Inaugurated: 1990 as VATC Bounding Away Quality
- Race type: Thoroughbred
- Sponsor: Sportsbet (2026)

Race information
- Distance: 1,000 metres
- Surface: Turf
- Track: Left-handed
- Qualification: Two year olds
- Weight: Set weights with penalties
- Purse: $200,000 (2026)

The Chairman's Stakes is a Melbourne Racing Club Group 3 Thoroughbred horse race, raced under set weights with penalties conditions for two-year-olds, over a distance of 1000 metres run at Caulfield Racecourse in Melbourne, Australia in February.

== History ==
Originally this race was named after Bounding Away, Australian Horse Of The Year 1985–1986, who won the 1986 Blue Diamond Stakes – Golden Slipper Stakes double.

Three horses have captured the Chairman's Stakes – Blue Diamond Stakes double:

- Redoute's Choice (1999)
- Road To Success (2000)
- Extreme Choice (2016)

Crystal Lily is the only horse to have captured the Chairman's Stakes – Golden Slipper Stakes double, having done this in 2020.

=== Name ===
- 1990–1998 - Bounding Away Quality
- 1999–2003 - Veuve Clicquot Stakes
- 2004 - Jansz Stakes
- 2005–2007 - Pol Rogers Stakes
- 2008 - National Jockey Celebration Classic
- 2009 - Pol Rogers Stakes
- 2010–2011 - Chairman's Stakes
- 2012 - Emirate Airline Stakes
- 2013 onwards - Chairman's Stakes

=== Grade ===
- 1990–2013 - Listed race
- 2014 onwards - Group 3

=== Distance ===
- 1990–1996 – 1000 metres
- 1997–2002 – 1100 metres
- 2003–2007 – 1200 metres
- 2008 – 1000 metres
- 2009–2010 – 1100 metres
- 2011 – 1000 metres
- 2012–2014 – 1100 metres
- 2015 – 1000 metres
- 2016 – 1100 metres
- 2017 onwards - 1000 metres

=== Venue ===
- 1990–1993 - Caulfield Racecourse
- 1994 - Sandown Racecourse
- 1995 - Caulfield Racecourse
- 1996 - Sandown Racecourse
- 1997–2010 - Caulfield Racecourse
- 2011 - Sandown Racecourse
- 2012–2014 - Caulfield Racecourse
- 2015 - Sandown Racecourse
- 2016 onwards - Caulfield Racecourse

== Winners ==
Previous winners of the race are as follows.

- 2026 - Big Sky
- 2025 - Inkaruna
- 2024 - Coleman
- 2023 - Zulfiqar
- 2022 - Sebonack
- 2021 - Enthaar
- 2020 - Mildred
- 2019 - Loving Gaby
- 2018 - Eniss Hill
- 2017 - Formality
- 2016 - Extreme Choice
- 2015 - Thurlow
- 2014 - Nayeli
- 2013 - Metastasio
- 2012 - Mama's Choice
- 2011 - Atomic
- 2010 - Crystal Lily
- 2009 - Headway
- 2008 - Whisper Bay
- 2007 - Gibraltar Campion
- 2006 - Ulfah
- 2005 - Under The Floor
- 2004 - Tirade
- 2003 - Vengeance Of Rain
- 2002 - Yell
- 2001 - Spitz
- 2000 - Road To Success
- 1999 - Redoute's Choice
- 1998 - Coup De Grace
- 1997 - Bonegilla Tom
- 1996 - Balcanny
- 1995 - Tennessee Magic
- 1994 - Fluoro
- 1993 - Lady In Reality
- 1992 - Tennessee Mist
- 1991 - Pampas Fire
- 1990 - Wrap Around

== See also ==
- List of Australian Group races
- Group races
