= Extreme Choice =

Australian-bred Thoroughbred racehorse

- Sire: Not A Single Doubt
- Grandsire: Redoute's Choice
- Dam: Extremely
- Damsire: Hussonet
- Sex: Stallion
- Foaled: 6 September 2013
- Country: Australia
- Colour: chestnut
- Owner: Newgate S F Syndicate, Blake Sandblom Pty Ltd, Aquis Farm, China Horse Club Racing Syndicate, Clarke Kent Syndicate, A Staver, M Davidson, M J Ward, G Macdonald, D Foley, G Jones, A Davis, A Bongiorno, P Marsh, D Turner, K Greer, L Wheeler, L Gonzy, J Turner & P A Horton
- Trainer: Mick Price
- Record: 8-4-0-1
- Earnings: A$1,736,250

Major wins
- Chairman's Stakes (G3)(2016); Blue Diamond Stakes (G1)(2016); A J Moir Stakes (G1)(2016)
- Last updated on 5 November 2017

Extreme Choice (foaled 6 September 2013) is a retired Thoroughbred racehorse and active sire trained and bred in Australia. He won the Blue Diamond Stakes and the A J Moir Stakes, Group One races. He amassed over a million dollars in winnings.

== Racing career ==
On 12 December 2015, Extreme Choice made his debut in the $500,000 Inglis Nursery, in which horses that were sold at The Inglis Yearling Sales are eligible to enter. The horse won, but had to trial 4 days before the race to qualify. Trainer Mick Price said, "I normally wouldn't do it, but I had to squeeze everything into him between gallops and trials and race day. You've got to have the horse to do it. Shins were good, constitution was good and it was fantastic for the people involved, including myself."

Extreme Choice returned in the 1000m Group 3 Chairman's Stakes in February, winning easily.

Three weeks later, Extreme Choice won the Group 1 Blue Diamond Stakes, with another Mick Price-trained horse, Flying Artie coming second. In his first race at 1200m, he collected $914,500 in the race for two-year-olds. Price said, "But all credit to Extreme Choice. Today was the day where he had an opportunity to really stand up. I think today we got a lot of information about the horse and we're off to the [Golden] Slipper." As a result of the win, the horse immediately entered favouritism for the race.

In the days before the Golden Slipper Stakes, it was announced that Extreme Choice would be racing in China Horse Club colours after they purchased a controlling interest in the horse in conjunction with Aquis Farm and Newgate Farm. The deal was to see the purchase price raise to 20 million dollars, should Extreme Choice have won the race. Finishing eighth, jockey Craig Newitt said, "I don't think he went 100 metres without getting interfered with the whole race. For him to get as close as he did his run was outstanding."

After a spell, Extreme Choice returned in the Group 1 A J Moir Stakes in September 2016. In his first appearance at Moonee Valley, Extreme Choice was said to have "left two of Australia’s greatest sprinters, Chautauqua and Buffering, in his wake with a devastating finishing burst to win". Three weeks later he failed to place in the Coolmore Stud Stakes and was spelled.

In February 2017, one owner listed his five percent share of Extreme Choice on bloodstock trading platform G1Xchange.com.

With a successful trial under his belt, Extreme Choice was the favourite for Oakleigh Plate in February 2017. Finishing third, a length behind winner Sheidel, Price said, "He ran home well but the two winners were in the right spot – on the speed. He certainly didn’t disappoint." With new jockey João Moreira onboard, Extreme Choice then failed to place in the Newmarket Handicap.

== Stud career ==
In March 2017, Extreme Choice was retired to stud, with a stud fee of $22,000 in 2018. Extreme Choice suffered from well publicized fertility issues but it has not blunted his impact on the breed. He is only the second stallion in history to sire a Melbourne Cup winner and Golden Slipper winner. In 2024, Extreme Choice stood at a stud fee of $A275,000 (inc. GST).

=== Notable progeny ===
c = colt, f = filly, g = gelding

Foaled	Name	Sex	Major wins
2018	Espiona	f	Coolmore Classic (2023)
2018	Stay Inside	c	Golden Slipper (2021)
2019	She's Extreme	f	Champagne Stakes (2022); VRC Oaks (2022)
2019	Knight's Choice	g	Melbourne Cup (2024)
2022	Apocalyptic	f	Flight Stakes
2022	Devil Night	c	Blue Diamond Stakes (2025)
