= Power Duke =

Australian-bred Thoroughbred racehorse

Power Duke (foaled 1954) was an Australian Thoroughbred racehorse that won the 1960 Group 1 Oakleigh Plate.

He was owned by a group of people, including the late Alf Cane. Power Duke was put down only a matter of weeks after winning the Oakleigh Plate when his uncontrollable behaviour became too much for the trainer and owners.
