= She Will Reign =

Australian Thoroughbred racehorse

- Sire: Manhattan Rain (AUS)
- Grandsire: Encosta De Lago (AUS)
- Dam: Courgette (AUS)
- Damsire: Charge Forward (AUS)
- Sex: Mare
- Foaled: 2014
- Country: Australia
- Colour: Bay or Brown
- Breeder: G Bachell
- Owner: MD Holland, KA Allison, G Bachell, RA Barrett, MJ Cameron, BP Craig, MJ Evans, B Furness, JA Haworth, T Hill, JA Green, R Kewley, A Pieper, JW Stone, MR Tobin, RS Wallace, CJ Webb, AR Whatson, Twoipee Racing (S O'Brien, M Lowe, T Casey, K Fisher, M Pes)
- Trainer: Gary Portelli
- Record: 12:6–1–0
- Earnings: $3,206,900

Major wins
- Silver Slipper Stakes (2017); Golden Slipper Stakes (2017); Moir Stakes (2017)

Awards
- Australian Champion Two Year Old (2017)
- Last updated on 24 September 2018

She Will Reign (foaled 26 August 2014) is a retired Australian thoroughbred racehorse and broodmare. She is a Dual Group 1 winning mare, having won the 2017 Group 1 2YO Golden Slipper over 1200m at Rosehill Gardens, and the 2017 Group 1 WFA Moir Stakes at Moonee Valley.

In 2017 she won the $3.5 million Golden Slipper Stakes after being purchased as a yearling for just $20,000.

In 2018 she was retired from racing as a four year old due to inflammation found in the lower airway. She will begin duties as a broodmare in the northern hemisphere.

She Will Reign's first foal was a colt named Danon Tornado who ran second in the 2023 Kyoto Shimbun Hai.
