= Canny Lad =

Australian thoroughbred racehorse and sire

- Sire: Bletchingly (Aus)
- Grandsire: Biscay (Aus)
- Dam: Jesmond Lass (Aus)
- Damsire: Lunchtime (GB)
- Sex: Stallion
- Foaled: 1987
- Country: Australia
- Colour: Brown
- Breeder: Alec Dobson
- Trainer: Rick Hore-Lacy
- Record: 15-8-1-2
- Earnings: $2,094,450

Canny Lad (1987 – 2014) was an Australian thoroughbred racehorse that won two Group 1 races and went on to become a successful sire.

Canny Lad was the brother of Sister Canny and Canny Lass who were also bred by Alec Dodson, their descendants include Camarena, Camarilla, Sepoy and Guelph.

== Racing career ==
Canny Lad was trained by Rick Hore-Lacy. He won his debut race, the listed Maribyrnong on 7 October 1989 at Flemington ridden by Shane Dye, who would ride him in most of his races.

Notable performances include the following:

- 1st in the 1989 Maribyrnong (listed, 900m), ridden by Shane Dye.
- 1st in the 1989 Florentino (Group 3, 900m), Shane Dye.
- 1st in the 1989 Maribyrnong Plate (Group 2, 1000m), Shane Dye.
- 1st in the BD Prelude (Group 3, 1000m Sandown), Shane Dye.
- 2nd in the 1990 Blue Diamond Stakes (Group 1, 1200m) behind Mahaasin, Shane Dye.
- 1st in the 1990 VRC Sires' Produce Stakes (Group 1, 1400m), ridden by Jimmy Cassidy.
- 1st in the 1990 Golden Slipper Stakes (Group 1, 1200m), Shane Dye.
- 1st in the 1990 Bill Stutt Stakes (Group 2, 1600m), Shane Dye.
- 3rd in the Cox Plate, as a 3-year old, behind Better Loosen Up and Sydeston, Shane Dye.
- 1st in the Tattersall's Stakes (Group 3, 1400m), ridden by Jimmy Cassidy.

He was retired after his 3-year old season.

== Stud career ==
After his racing career, Canny Lad stood at stud with success. His progeny included:

- Accomplice: winner of the 1997 Doomben 10,000 and The Galaxy (ATC)
- Allez Suez: winner of the 1999 Epsom Handicap
- Ancient Song: winner of the 2002 Light Fingers Stakes, ATC June Stakes and 2003 Salinger Stakes
- Calveen: winner of the 2005 Easter Handicap (Group 1, 1600m, Ellerslie)
- Cannsea: winner of the 2000 Railway Stakes (New Zealand) (Group 1, 1200m, Ellerslie)
- Dodge: winner of the 1998 Queensland Derby & Epsom Handicap
- He's No Pie Eater: winner of the 2007 Rosehill Guineas & 2007 Chipping Norton Stakes.
- Preserve: winner of the 2000 Sires' Produce Stakes (VRC).
- Republic Lass: winner of the 2002 Australian Oaks & 2003 Ranvet Stakes.
- Small Minds: winner of the 2010 Schweppes Oaks.

=== Descendants ===
Canny Lad was broodmare/dam sire of:

- Desert War: a six-time Group 1 winner.
- I Am Invincible: Australian Champion Sire (2022–2024)
- Mnemosyne: winner of the 2005 The Thousand Guineas & 2006 Queen of the Turf Stakes
- Redoute's Choice, a multiple Group 1 winner and leading sire in his own regard.

His legacy has carried on through descendants such as:

- Anamoe
- Giga Kick
- Imperatriz
- Snitzel
- Zoustar

== Retirement and death ==
After retiring from stud duties in 2011 Canny Lad shared a paddock with Octagonal. He died in 2014 and was buried at Woodlands.

== See also ==
Thoroughbred racing in Australia
