= Baguette (horse) =

Australian-bred Thoroughbred racehorse

- Sire: Rego (IRE)
- Grandsire: Nasrullah (IRE)
- Dam: Dark Jewel
- Damsire: Star Kingdom (IRE)
- Sex: Stallion
- Foaled: 1967
- Country: Australia
- Colour: Brown
- Breeder: Mr & Mrs Peter G. Tait
- Owner: 1. Mr & Mrs Peter G. Tait; 2. A syndicate
- Trainer: Fil Allotta
- Record: 31: 15-7-4
- Earnings: A$195,200

Major wins
- Golden Slipper Stakes (1970); AJC Sires’ Produce Stakes (1970); Champagne Stakes (1970); Newmarket Handicap (1971)

Honours
- Australian Racing Hall of Fame
- Last updated on 16 August 2010

Baguette was an Australian bred Thoroughbred racehorse that was undefeated as a two-year-old and became the first winner of the Two Year Old Triple Crown. His wins included 14 Principal Races and he retired to become a good sire.

== Breeding ==
He was by the winner and good sire, Rego (IRE), his dam was the good broodmare, Dark Jewel by the outstanding sire, Star Kingdom (IRE) (pictured). Dark Jewel produced 10 named foals for five stakes winners including Baguette’s full sisters, Birthright (won VRC Maribyrnong Plate) and Heirloom (won VRC Maribyrnong Plate, dead-heated for first in VATC One Thousand Guineas). Baguette was a half-brother to the stakes winners, Betelgeuse by Wilkes (FR) (City Tattersalls Club Lightning Stakes and AJC The Shorts) and Cabochon by Edmundo (AJC Epsom Handicap, QTC Stradbroke Handicap etc.) Dark Jewel’s progeny won over sixty-eight races for A$428,547 in prize money in Australia and Malaysia.

== Racing record ==
Baguette was trained by Fil Allotta at Randwick. A consistent performer, Baguette, won all of his seven starts in his two-year-old season and only once finished worse than third in his first 23 races when unplaced in the VATC Futurity Stakes.

Baguette won the following stakes races:

- 1969 AJC Breeders' Plate (5f)
- 1969 STC Silver Slipper Stakes (4½f)
- 1969 VRC Maribyrnong Plate (5f)
- 1970 STC Golden Slipper Stakes (6f)
- 1970 AJC Sires Produce Stakes (7f)
- 1970 AJC Champagne Stakes (6f)
- 1970 AJC Hobartville Stakes (7f)
- 1971 VRC Newmarket Handicap (6f)
- 1971 BATC Doomben 10,000 (6¾f)
- 1971 STC Canterbury Stakes (6f)
- 1971 STC Hill Stakes (8½f)
- 1971 AJC George Main Stakes (1 mile)
- 1971 BATC Booroolong Handicap (1,118 metres)
- 1971 STC Railway Quality Handicap

=== Summary ===
His major race victories include the 1970 STC Golden Slipper Stakes, 1970 AJC Sires’ Produce Stakes, 1970 AJC Champagne Stakes and the 1971 VRC Newmarket Handicap.

Baguette had a total of 31 starts for 15 wins, 7 seconds, 4 thirds for $195,200 in prize-money.

== Stud record ==
In 1972 Baguette was syndicated as a stallion into a total of forty-five shares at $7,300 which was then an Australian record of $328,500 for a stallion. He stood at the famous Kia Ora Stud at Scone in New South Wales alongside Gunsynd. Baguette's progeny included 18 stakes-winners which had 35 stakes wins between them. They included the winners listed below.

- Crown Jester (STC Todman Slipper Trial, sire of the Golden Slipper winners Guineas and Rory's Jester)
- Dark Eclipse (5 wins including STC Golden Slipper Stakes, Tea Rose Stakes etc.)
- Fiancee (STC Silver Slipper Stakes, AJC Gimcrack Stakes)
- Hit It Benny (11 wins & $171,000 inc. BATC Rothman's "100 000")
- I Like Diamonds (AJC Champagne Stakes)
- Lady Manina (12 wins & $39,755 incl. 10 in succession inc. Tattersalls Carrington Stakes)
- Romantic Dream (14 wins, 900 to 1,600 m & $184,525 inc. QTC Sires Produce Stakes, NJC Cameron Handicap etc.)

Baguette’s daughters produced the racehorses, Clan O’Sullivan, Diamond Shower, Paris Opera, Vain Karioi and others.

Baguette died at the stud on 1 January 1984 after suffering a massive haemorrhage.

== See also ==
- Triple Crown of Thoroughbred Racing
