= Tim Clark (jockey) =

Tim Clark (born 1 August 1986) is a horse racing jockey. He has ridden 496 winners overall in Australia with 2010–2011 his best season to date, in which he rode 97 winners. He started his career in Hong Kong in 2011–2012.

== Major wins ==
- The Galaxy - Typhoon Zed (2008)
- Doncaster Handicap - Sacred Choice (2011)
- The Galaxy - Atomic Force (2011)
- All Aged Stakes - Hot Danish (2010)
- Doomben 10,000 - Hot Danish (2010}
- Underwood Stakes - Alligator Blood (2022)

== Performance ==
Seasons	Total Rides	No. of Wins	No. of 2nds	No. of 3rds	No. of 4ths	Stakes won
2011/2012	256	11	14	17	19	HK$14,463,438

Last update: 13 Feb 2012
