= John Messara =

Australian racehorse breeder

John Messara is an Australian thoroughbred horse breeder and owner who served from 2011 to 2016 as the chairman of Racing New South Wales, a body established under the Thoroughbred Racing Act 1996 to control and regulate the NSW Thoroughbred Racing Industry. He was elected deputy chairman of the Australian Racing Board in June 2012, and served as chairman from January 2014 to December 2016. Messara has also been a Member of the Australian Pattern Committee. Messara formerly chaired the boards of Thoroughbred Breeders Australia (2007–2008) and Aushorse Marketing (2001–2008)

== Personal life ==
John Messara was born in Alexandria, Egypt and emigrated in 1958 to Sydney, Australia where he was educated at St Ignatius College, and the University of New South Wales. He holds a Bachelor of Commerce degree and is a certified public accountant. He married his wife Kristine in 1973 and they have four adult children: Louise, Paul, Michael and Susanne.

== Career ==
Messara began his career with Edwin V. Nixon & Partners (Arthur Young & Co), chartered accountants, before joining the firm of Ralph King & Yuill, Member of the Sydney Stock Exchange, and establishing its European Branch in Geneva, Switzerland.

He returned to Australia, was elected a Member of the Sydney Stock Exchange in 1973 and established J. M. Messara & Co., Stockbrokers. He retained membership of the Stock Exchange until 1992.

In 1985, Messara established the thoroughbred racing and breeding business Arrowfield Group Limited.

In 1993 he took up a position as executive chairman of the then Stock Exchange-listed company, Arrowfield Group Ltd (formerly Australian Racing & Breeding Stables).

In August 2000 he privatised the Arrowfield Group and became the sole shareholder and chairman of the company.

In 2018 he was commissioned to prepare a report for the New Zealand Government in respect of the New Zealand racing industry's governance structures, and provide recommendations on future directions for the industry (the Messara Report) which was then used as a basis for Government reforms.

== Career achievements ==
Through his leadership and management of Arrowfield Stud, Messara:

- Launched and managed the early Australian stud career of Champion sire Danehill.
- Purchased Danehill in partnership with Coolmore Stud, thereby initiating the modern practice of shuttling stallions between hemispheres.
- Has launched and managed the stallion careers of Champion Sires Redoute's Choice, Snitzel & Flying Spur.
- Has developed successful partnerships and joint ventures with several of the world's most significant owners and breeders, including Sheikh Mohammed bin Rashid Al Maktoum, Markus Jooste, the Yoshida family and the Aga Khan, as well as the late Robert Sangster and the late Sheikh Maktoum bin Rashid Al Maktoum (through Gainsborough Stud).
- Has bred, raised and/or sold over 70 Group 1 winners including 2007–2008 Australian Champion Racehorse of the Year Weekend Hussler, Champion 2YO & Champion 3YO Filly Miss Finland, Champion 3YO Filly Shoals, Champion Sires Flying Spur & Zabeel, Alverta, Castelvecchio, Danewin, Danzero, Dr Grace, Forensics, Kenedna, Mahaya, Maid Of Heaven, Master of Design, Mentality, Nothin' Leica Dane, Pharaoh, Snitzerland, Stay With Me & The Autumn Sun.
- Has raced Group 1 winners including All American, Alverta, Animal Kingdom, Dundeel, Flying Spur, Mahaya, Miss Finland, Shoals, Snitzel & The Autumn Sun.

=== Awards ===
Messara's work within, and on behalf of the Australian thoroughbred industry has been recognised with several awards including:

- 2019 Longines & IFHA International Award of Merit

recognising "distinguished horsemen and horsewomen for lifelong contributions to Thoroughbred racing."

- 2016 Australian Turf Club - Life Membership

for "outstanding service and leadership."

- 2011 NSW Breeders’ inaugural Heroic Award

for "an exceptional contribution to the NSW and Australian thoroughbred breeding industries in leadership, innovation, achievement and excellence.”

- 2008 appointed Member of the Order of Australia

for "services to the thoroughbred horse racing industry, particularly through the introduction of best practice initiatives in the areas of reproduction and stud management.”

- 2008 Hunter Thoroughbred Breeders Association President's Award

for efforts on behalf of the industry as Aushorse chairman and Thoroughbred Breeders' Association President.

- 2008 NSW Department of Primary Industries Certificate of Appreciation

for outstanding contribution to the Equine Influenza Eradication Campaign.

Messara was ranked 40th on the 2013 list of the Top 50 Most Powerful People in NSW.

== Arrowfield Stud ==
Arrowfield Stud
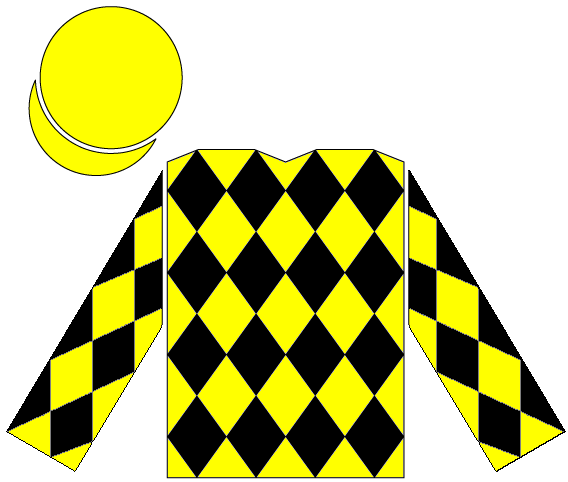
- Racing silks of Arrowfield Stud
- Country: Australia
- State: New South Wales
- Acreage: 2,500
- Purchased: 1985
- Chairman: John Messara
- Website: www.arrowfield.com.au
- Coordinates: 32.060187°S 150.935308°E

Arrowfield Stud was established by John Messara in 1985. It is a thoroughbred stud farm comprising 2,500 acres in the fertile Segenhoe Valley, near Scone. Arrowfield Stud is the largest Australian-owned thoroughbred stud, and as of 2023 had 8 stallions standing stud including the four-time leading sire in Australia Snitzel, and previously the three-time leading sire Redoute's Choice.

Stallions standing at stud (2023)

- Admire Mars (JPN)
- Castelvecchio
- Dundeel (NZ)
- Hitotsu
- Maurice (JPN)
- Showtime
- Snitzel
- The Autumn Sun
