= Rory's Jester =

Australian bred thoroughbred racehorse

- Sire: Crown Jester
- Grandsire: Baguette
- Dam: Rory's Rocket
- Damsire: Roan Rocket
- Sex: Colt
- Foaled: 17 November 1982
- Died: 27 March 2007 (aged 24)
- Country: Australia
- Colour: Chestnut
- Breeder: Mr & Mrs L Outtrim
- Owner: S Vanian, GD & LA Bignell, BM Outtrim, BD Hayes
- Trainer: Colin Hayes
- Record: 17: 7-6-0
- Earnings: A$509,850

Major wins
- Pago Pago Stakes (1985); Golden Slipper Stakes (1985); The Black Douglas (1985); R. N. Irwin Stakes (1986)

Rory's Jester (17 November 1982-27 March 2007) was a notable Australian Thoroughbred racehorse and sire. A chestnut son of Crown Jester from Rory's Rocket (GB) by Roan Rocket, he was trained by Colin Hayes.

== Racing career ==
Some of his major race victories include the 1985 STC Golden Slipper Stakes, STC Pago Pago Stakes and the SAJC R.N. Irwin Stakes. He also finished second (to Hula Chief) in the 1986 VRC Lightning Stakes. Predominantly a speed horse, he won races over sprint distances ranging from 1,000m to 1,200m.

== Stud career ==
Since retiring to stud he became Australian Champion First Season Sire with his first crop of precocious and speedy two-year-olds. His outstanding progeny included Racer's Edge, Chortle, Happy Giggle, Isca and Light Up The World.

== Death ==
Rory's Jester was retired from stud duties in 2005. He was humanely euthanized at Swettenham Stud in Victoria in 2007 at the age of 24.
