= Danehill (horse) =

American-bred Thoroughbred racehorse (1986–2003)

- Racing silks of Khalid Abdullah
- Sire: Danzig
- Grandsire: Northern Dancer
- Dam: Razyana
- Damsire: His Majesty
- Sex: Stallion
- Foaled: 26 March 1986
- Died: 13 May 2003 (aged 17)
- Country: United States
- Colour: Bay
- Breeder: Juddmonte Farms
- Owner: Prince Khalid Abdullah
- Trainer: Jeremy Tree
- Record: 9: 4-1-2
- Earnings: £177,465

Major wins
- Cork and Orrery Stakes (1989); Haydock Sprint Cup (1989)

Awards
- Leading sire in Australia (1995–1997, 2000–2005); Leading sire in France (2001, 2007); Leading sire in GB & Ireland (2005, 2006, 2007); Leading broodmare sire in North America (2011); Leading broodmare sire in GB & Ireland (2012)

Honours
- Australian Racing Hall of Fame
- Last updated on August 25, 2014

Danehill (26 March 1986 – 13 May 2003) was an American-bred, British-trained Thoroughbred racehorse who was the most successful sire of all time with 349 stakes winners and 89 Grade 1 winners. He was the leading sire in Australia nine times, the leading sire in Great Britain and Ireland three times and the leading sire in France twice.

== Background ==
Danehill was a bay stallion by leading sire Danzig (by Northern Dancer) out of Razyana (by His Majesty). Danehill was inbred twice to Natalma in the third generation (3x3) of his pedigree. He was a brother to a stakes winner, Eagle Eyed, and two other stallions, Anziyan and Nuclear Freeze. Danehill was owned during his racing career by Khalid Abdullah, who also bred him.

== Racing career ==
Trained by Jeremy Tree, Danehill ran nine times, winning four. As a three-year-old, following a third placing in the 2,000 Guineas behind Nashwan and a fourth place in the Irish equivalent, Danehill was switched to sprinting, winning the Cork and Orrery Stakes at Ascot and the Haydock Sprint Cup. During his racing career he earned a total of £177,465 and ran to a peak Timeform rating of T126.

== Stud record ==
Danehill retired to stud duties in 1990 at the Coolmore Stud in Ireland and made his greatest impact as a stallion.

Sold by his owner under advice to the partnership of Arrowfield Stud of Scone, New South Wales, Australia, and Ireland's Coolmore Stud, he came to Australia as a shuttle stallion in 1990. At the end of the stud season, he returned to Coolmore Stud in Ireland. He was an immediate sensation at stud in Australia, where he was leading sire on many occasions. Danehill returned to Australia ten more times and also served one season at stud in Japan during 1996.

With his appeal to European breeders, he became the first high-profile shuttle stallion, standing the Northern Hemisphere covering season at Coolmore's Irish facility. Coolmore subsequently became his sole owner after a $24 million deal, making him the most valuable Thoroughbred in Australian breeding history.

Danehill's success in the United Kingdom, Ireland and France was slow to develop as connections had convinced themselves the Danehills required wet tracks and light work. After winning 3 Golden Slippers in his first 3 crops in Australia the opposite was proven true and Ballydoyle who had the majority of the NH Danehills adjusted their training methods which yielded Aidan O'Brien's first G1 success when Desert King, from the 4th crop of Danehill, won the G1 National Stakes for 2yos at The Curragh in 1996 under Walter Swinburn.

Danehill's highest rated racehorses were Rock Of Gibraltar (Sussex Stakes 2002), George Washington (Queen Elizabeth II Stakes 2006), Dylan Thomas (Prix de l'Arc de Triomphe 2007 and King George & Queen Elizabeth Stakes 2007), Duke Of Marmalade (Prince of Wales's Stakes 2008), Mozart (July Cup 2001) and Westerner (Ascot Gold Cup 2005).

== Group 1 winners sired ==
c = colt, f = filly, g = gelding, n = Northern Hemisphere, s = Southern Hemisphere

Foaled	Name	Sex	Major wins
1991n	Danish	f	Queen Elizabeth II Challenge Cup Stakes
1991n	Kissing Cousin	f	Coronation Stakes
1991s	Danarani	f	Toorak Handicap, Flight Stakes
1991s	Danasinga	c	Stradbroke Handicap
1991s	Danewin	c	Mackinnon Stakes, Caulfield Stakes, Doomben Cup, Spring Champion Stakes, Rosehill Guineas
1991s	Danzero	c	Golden Slipper
1991s	Joie Denise	f	Queensland Oaks
1992s	Daney Boy	g	Karrakatta Plate
1992s	Flying Spur	c	Golden Slipper, Australian Guineas, All Aged Stakes
1992s	Nothin' Leica Dane	c	Spring Champion Stakes, Victoria Derby
1993n	Danehill Dancer	c	Phoenix Stakes, National Stakes
1993s	Dane Ripper	f	Stradbroke Handicap, W. S. Cox Plate, Australian Cup, Manikato Stakes
1993s	Danendri	f	Australian Oaks, Vinery Stud Stakes
1993s	Dashing Eagle	f	The Thousand Guineas, Flight Stakes
1993s	Magic of Sydney	f	Spring Champion Stakes
1993s	Merlene	f	Golden Slipper, AJC Sires' Produce Stakes
1994n	Desert King	c	National Stakes, Irish 2,000 Guineas, Irish Derby
1994s	Special Dane	c	C F Orr Stakes
1995n	Tiger Hill	c	Grosser Preis von Baden, Bayerisches Zuchtrennen
1995s	Arena	c	Canterbury Guineas, Victoria Derby
1995s	Camarena	f	Queensland Derby
1995s	Danelagh	f	Blue Diamond Stakes
1995s	Danske	c	New Zealand 2000 Guineas
1995s	Miss Danehill	f	Queensland Oaks
1996n	Indian Danehill	c	Prix Ganay
1996n	Wannabe Grand	f	Cheveley Park Stakes
1996s	Blackfriars	c	Victoria Derby
1996s	Catbird	c	Golden Slipper Stakes
1996s	Emerald Dream	f	New Zealand International Stakes
1996s	Redoute's Choice	c	Blue Diamond Stakes, Caulfield Guineas, Manikato Stakes, C F Orr Stakes
1996s	Laisserfaire	f	Cape Flying Championship (2001, 2002), South Africa Fillies Sprint (2001, 2002), Computaform Sprint(2002)
1997s	Asia	f	South Australian Oaks
1997s	Keeper	c	Goodwood Handicap
1997s	Mr Murphy	g	Futurity Stakes, Australian Guineas, Sir Rupert Clarke Stakes
1998n	Aquarelliste	f	Prix de Diane, Prix Vermeille, Prix Ganay
1998n	Banks Hill	f	Coronation Stakes, Breeders' Cup Filly & Mare Turf, Prix Jacques Le Marois
1998n	Mozart	c	July Cup, Nunthorpe Stakes
1998n	Regal Rose	f	Cheveley Park Stakes
1998s	Danestorm	c	Brisbane Cup
1998s	Ha Ha	f	Golden Slipper
1998s	Magical Miss	f	The Thousand Guineas, VRC Oaks
1998s	Viking Ruler	c	Spring Champion Stakes
1999n	Dress To Thrill	f	Matriarch Stakes
1999n	Fine Motion	f	Shuka Sho, Queen Elizabeth II Commemorative Cup
1999n	Landseer	c	Poule d'Essai des Poulains, Shadwell Turf Mile Stakes
1999n	Rock of Gibraltar	c	Grand Critérium, Dewhurst Stakes, 2000 Guineas, Irish 2,000 Guineas, St James's Palace Stakes, Sussex Stakes, Prix du Moulin
1999n	Westerner	c	Prix du Cadran, Prix Royal-Oak, Ascot Gold Cup
1999s	Larrocha	f	South Australian Oaks
1999s	Lucky Owners	c	Hong Kong Mile
1999s	Platinum Scissors	c	Spring Champion Stakes, Doomben Cup
1999s	The Duke	g	Hong Kong Mile
2000n	Clodovil	c	Poule d'Essai des Poulains
2000n	Intercontinental	f	Jenny Wiley Stakes, Just A Game Handicap, Matriarch Stakes
2000n	Light Jig	f	Yellow Ribbon Stakes
2000n	Spartacus	c	Phoenix Stakes, Gran Criterium
2000s	Elvstroem	c	Victoria Derby, Caulfield Cup, Underwood Stakes, C F Orr Stakes, Dubai Duty Free Stakes
2000s	Exceed And Excel	c	Sir Rupert Clarke Stakes, Newmarket Handicap
2001n	Artiste Royal	c	Clement L. Hirsch Turf Championship Stakes, Charles Whittingham Stakes
2001n	Cacique	c	Man o' War Stakes, Manhattan Handicap
2001n	Grey Lilas	f	Prix du Moulin
2001n	North Light	c	Epsom Derby
2001n	Punctilious	f	Yorkshire Oaks
2001s	Al Maher	c	Australian Guineas
2001s	Aqua d'Amore	f	Futurity Stakes
2001s	Fastnet Rock	c	Lexus Classic, Lightning Stakes, Oakleigh Plate
2001s	Shinzig	c	C F Orr Stakes
2001s	Zipping	g	Turnbull Stakes, Australian Cup
2002n	Echelon	f	Matron Stakes
2002n	Luas Line	f	Garden City Handicap
2002n	Mountain High	c	Grand Prix de Saint-Cloud
2002n	Oratorio	c	Prix Jean-Luc Lagardère, Eclipse Stakes, Irish Champion Stakes
2002s	Darci Brahma	c	The T J Smith, New Zealand 2000 Guineas, Otaki-Maori Weight for Age, Waikato Sprint, Telegraph Handicap
2003n	Aussie Rules	c	Poule d'Essai des Poulains, Shadwell Turf Mile Stakes
2003n	Champs Elysees	c	Hollywood Turf Cup Stakes, Northern Dancer Turf Stakes, Canadian International Stakes
2003n	Dylan Thomas	c	Irish Derby, Irish Champion Stakes, Prix Ganay, King George VI and Queen Elizabeth Stakes, Prix de l'Arc de Triomphe
2003n	George Washington	c	Phoenix Stakes, National Stakes, 2,000 Guineas, Queen Elizabeth II Stakes
2003n	Horatio Nelson	c	Prix Jean-Luc Lagardère
2003n	Rumplestiltskin	f	Moyglare Stud Stakes, Prix Marcel Boussac
2003s	Arlington Road	g	All Aged Stakes
2004n	Duke of Marmalade	c	Prix Ganay, Tattersalls Gold Cup, Prince of Wales's Stakes, King George VI and Queen Elizabeth Stakes, International Stakes
2004n	Holy Roman Emperor	c	Phoenix Stakes, Prix Jean-Luc Lagardère
2004n	Peeping Fawn	f	Pretty Polly Stakes, Irish Oaks, Nassau Stakes, Yorkshire Oaks
2004n	Promising Lead	f	Pretty Polly Stakes
2004n	Simply Perfect	f	Fillies' Mile, Falmouth Stakes

Also: Scintillation (3 × Hong Kong local G1), Fairy King Prawn (4 × Hong Kong local G1,1 x Japan G1). Fairy King Prawn won local G1 in Hong Kong and a local G1 in Japan but neither was a race listed in Part 1 of the International Cataloguing Standards, which means they counted for listed status only.

His total of 84 International G1 winners was a world record until June 2020 when Peaceful won the G1 Irish 1000 Guineas in Ireland, thereby making her a new world-record 85th G1 winner for her sire, Galileo.

Danehill was the sire of 2,485 foals, of which 347 were black-type winners (209 Group winners and 138 Listed winners). Danehill's last foal crop, which comprised 96 live foals, were born in 2004.

Danzig and his son, Danehill, were dominant bay sires along with Danehill's sons. This meant that they would not produce chestnut progeny and only a grey if the foal's dam was grey.

On 13 May 2003, Danehill died in a paddock accident at Coolmore Stud. He was being hand-led in his paddock when he reared playfully and landed awkwardly, breaking a hip. Even with some of the world's best veterinary practitioners on hand, it was decided there was no alternative but to put the horse down. Coolmore received £36 million from their insurance upon his death.

== Pedigree ==
Pedigree of Danehill (USA), bay stallion, 1986
Sire Danzig (USA) 1977	Northern Dancer (CAN); 1961	Nearctic (CAN)	Nearco
Sire Danzig (USA) 1977	Northern Dancer (CAN); 1961	Nearctic (CAN)	Lady Angela
Sire Danzig (USA) 1977	Northern Dancer (CAN); 1961	Natalma (USA)	Native Dancer
Sire Danzig (USA) 1977	Northern Dancer (CAN); 1961	Natalma (USA)	Almahmoud
Sire Danzig (USA) 1977	Pas de Nom (USA); 1968	Admiral's Voyage	Crafty Admiral
Sire Danzig (USA) 1977	Pas de Nom (USA); 1968	Admiral's Voyage	Olympia Lou
Sire Danzig (USA) 1977	Pas de Nom (USA); 1968	Petitioner (GB)	Petition
Sire Danzig (USA) 1977	Pas de Nom (USA); 1968	Petitioner (GB)	Steady Aim
Dam Razyana (USA) 1981	His Majesty	Ribot (GB)	Tenerani
Dam Razyana (USA) 1981	His Majesty	Ribot (GB)	Romanella
Dam Razyana (USA) 1981	His Majesty	Flower Bowl	Alibhai
Dam Razyana (USA) 1981	His Majesty	Flower Bowl	Flower Bed
Dam Razyana (USA) 1981	Spring Adieu (CAN)	Buckpasser	Tom Fool
Dam Razyana (USA) 1981	Spring Adieu (CAN)	Buckpasser	Busanda
Dam Razyana (USA) 1981	Spring Adieu (CAN)	Natalma (USA)	Native Dancer
Dam Razyana (USA) 1981	Spring Adieu (CAN)	Natalma (USA)	Almahmoud (Family: 2D)

Danehill is inbred 3 x 3 to Natalma. This means that Danehill is inbred 4 x 4 to both Native Dancer and Almahmoud.

== See also ==
- List of racehorses
