= Oakleigh Plate =

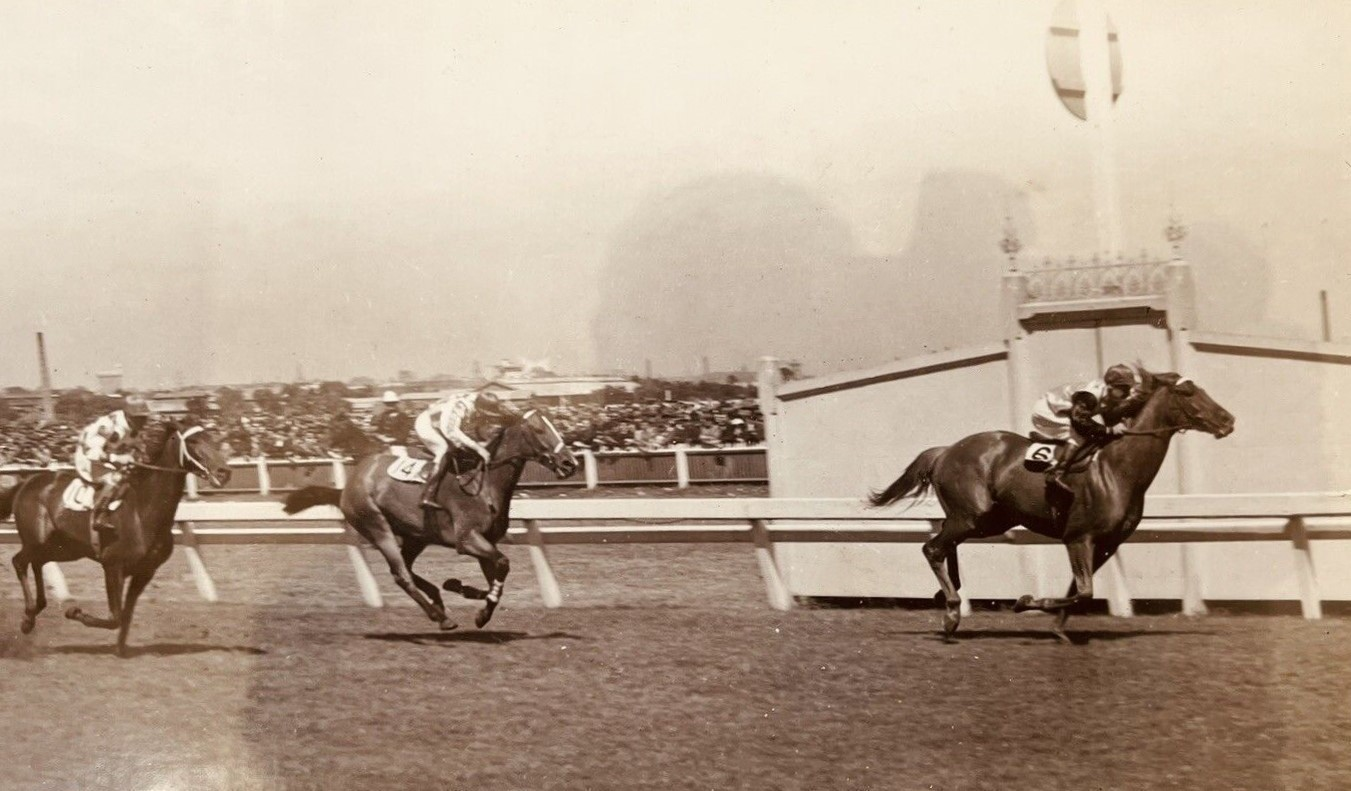
- High Title, 1942 winner
- Class: Group 1
- Location: Caulfield Racecourse
- Inaugurated: 1884
- Race type: Thoroughbred
- Sponsor: Sportsbet (2026)

Race information
- Distance: 1,100 metres
- Surface: Turf
- Qualification: Maidens ineligible
- Weight: Handicap
- Purse: $750,000 (2026)

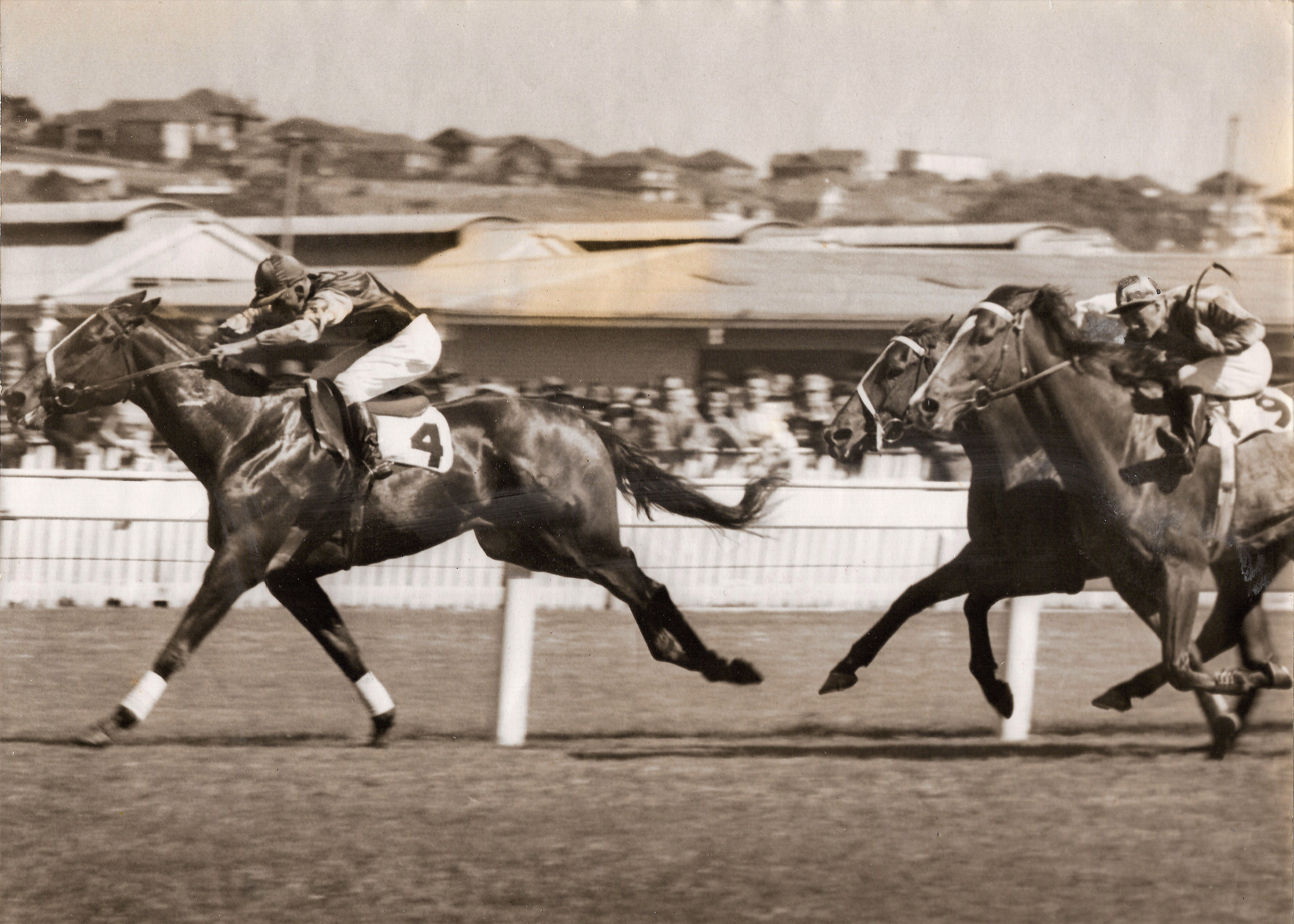
San Domenico, 1949 winner

The Oakleigh Plate is a Melbourne Racing Club Group 1 Thoroughbred open handicap horse race, run over a distance of 1100 metres at Caulfield Racecourse, Melbourne, Australia in late February.

== History ==
The Oakleigh Plate forms the middle leg of the autumn sprinting series over the Melbourne Autumn Carnival, preceded by the G1 Lightning Stakes run over 1000m, WFA, Flemington, on the last Saturday in January, and followed by the Newmarket Handicap, run over 1200m at Flemington in the first week of March.

=== 1949 racebook ===
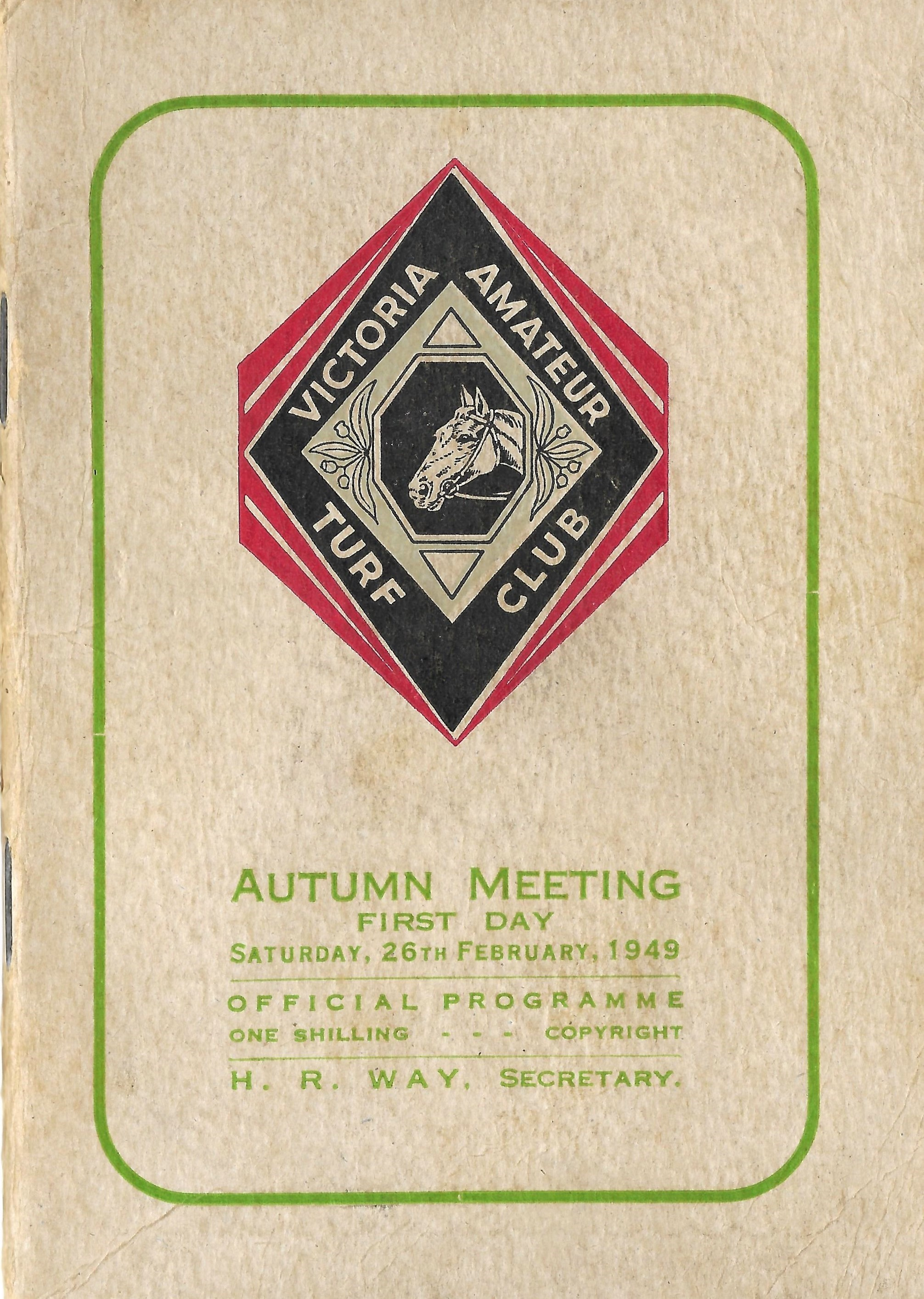
1949 VATC Oakleigh Plate racebook front cover

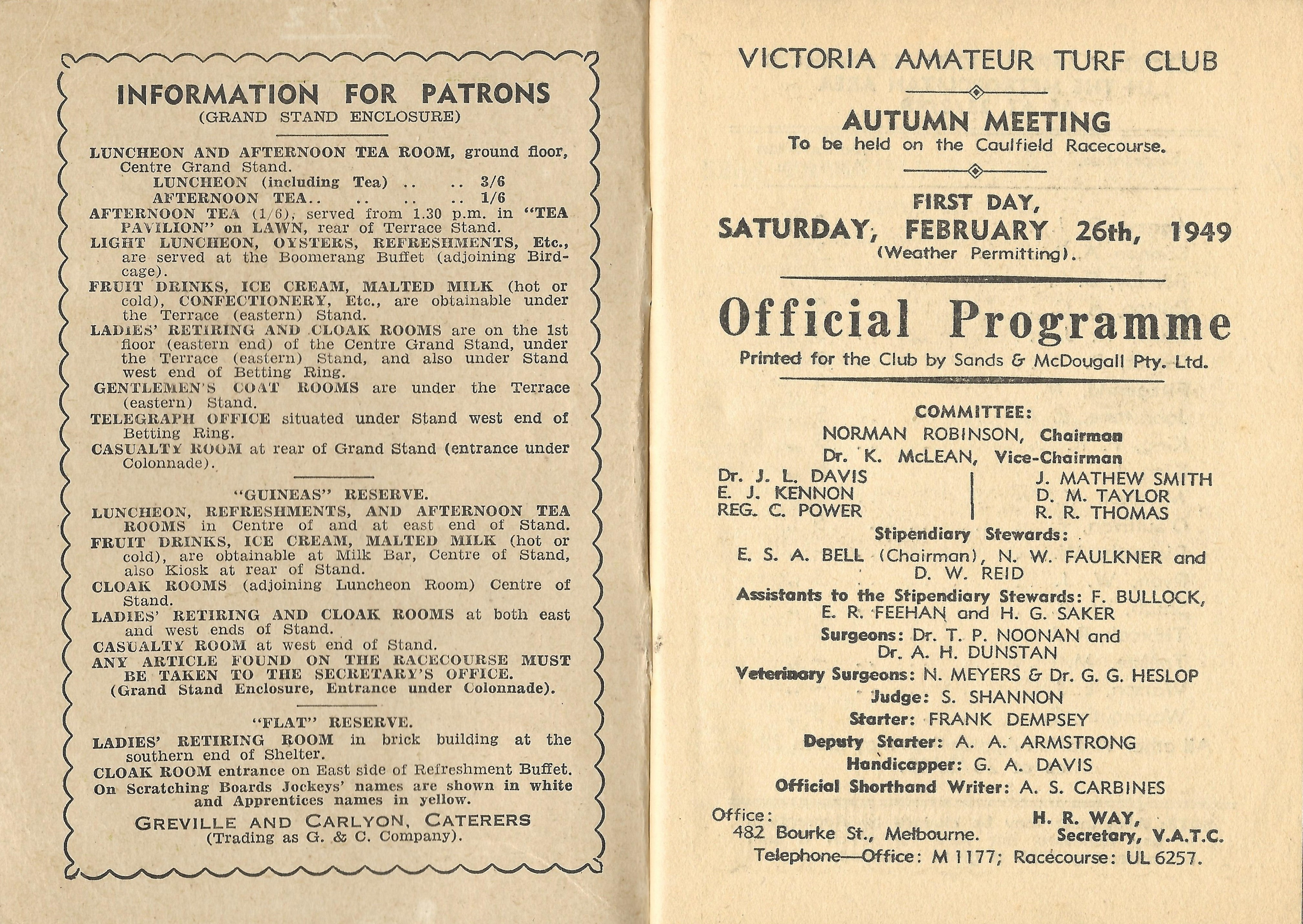
1949 VATC Oakleigh Plate raceday officials

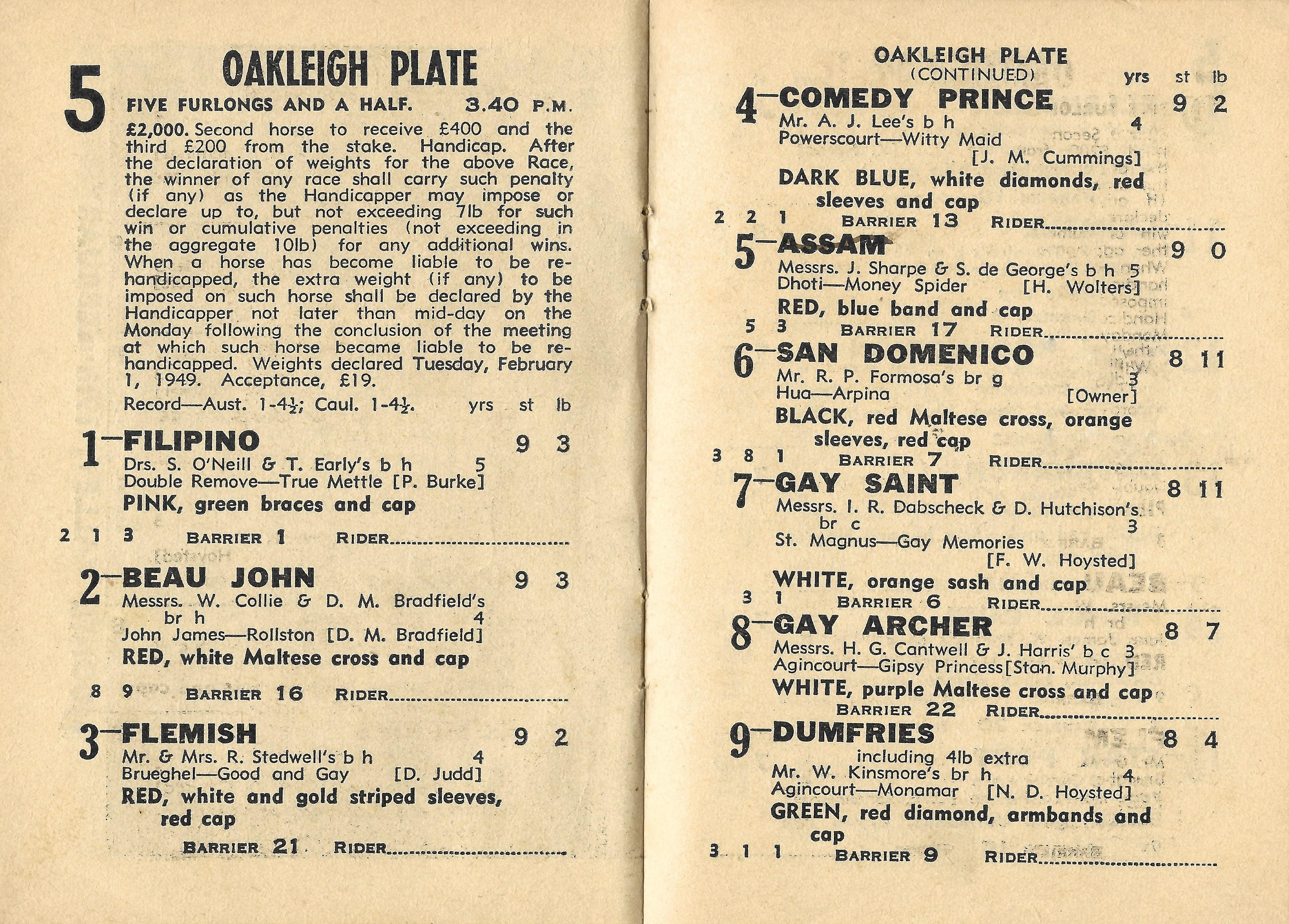
1949 VATC Oakleigh Plate showing the winner, San Domenico

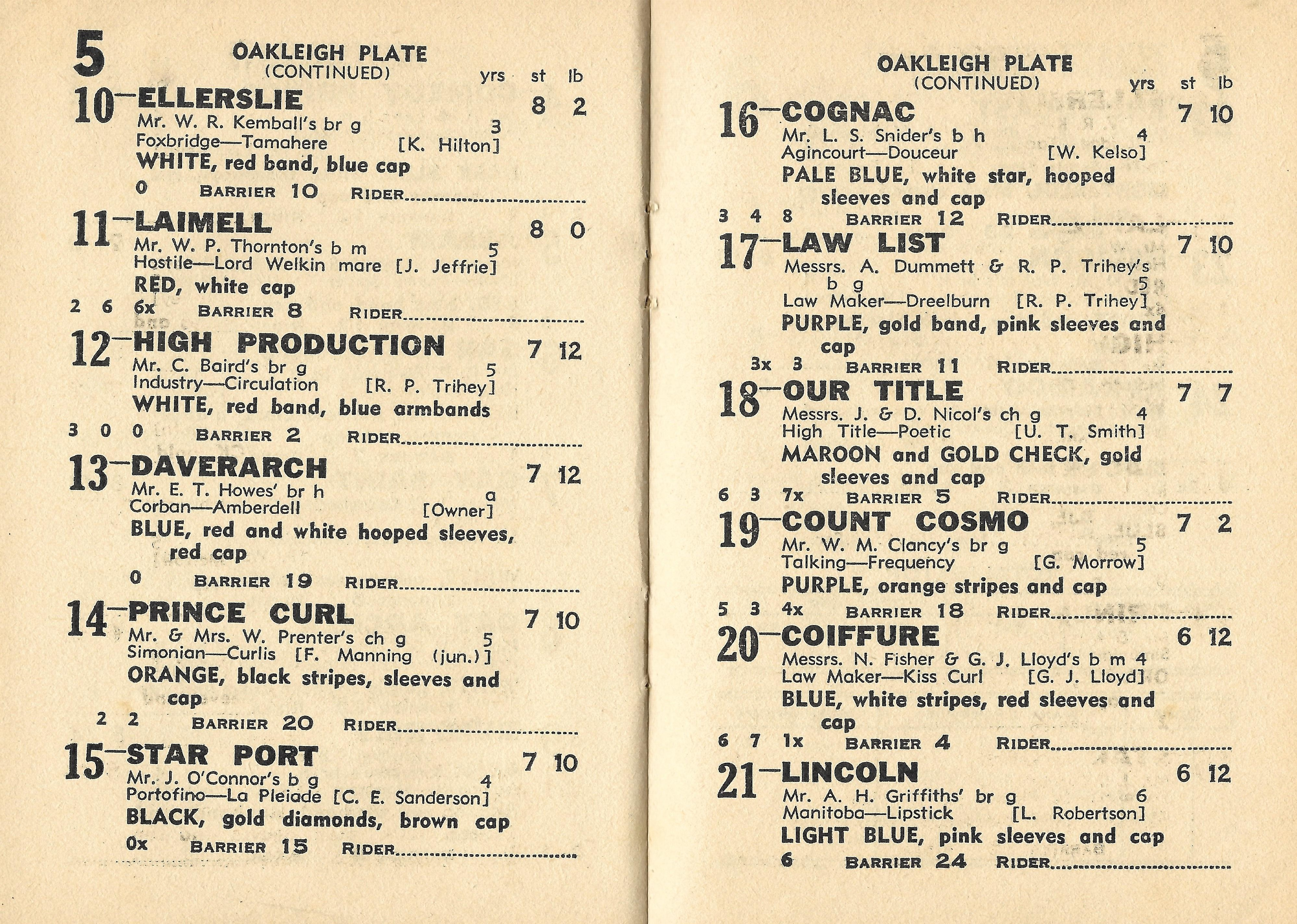
1949 VATC Oakleigh Plate starters and results

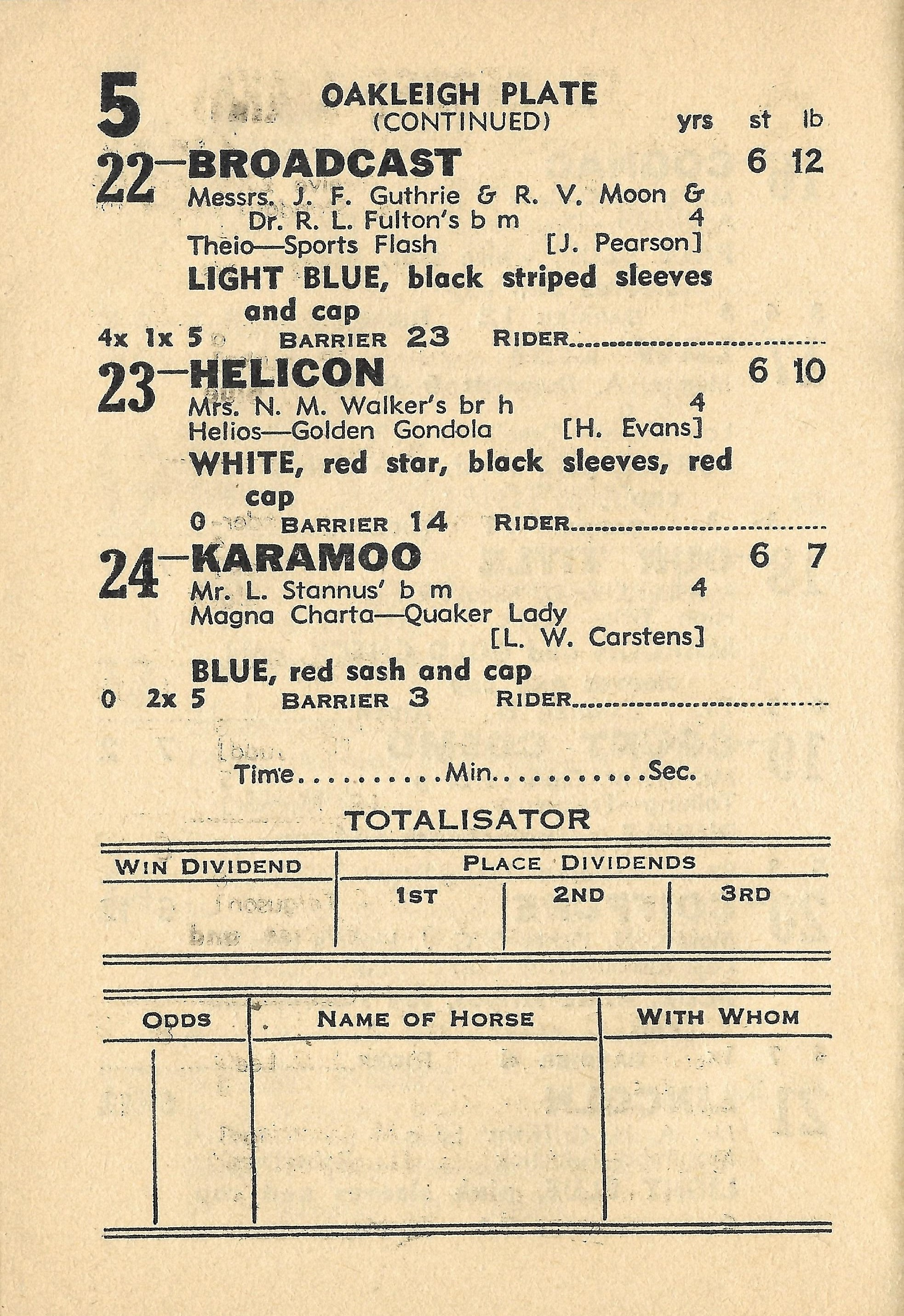
1949 VATC Oakleigh Plate starters and results

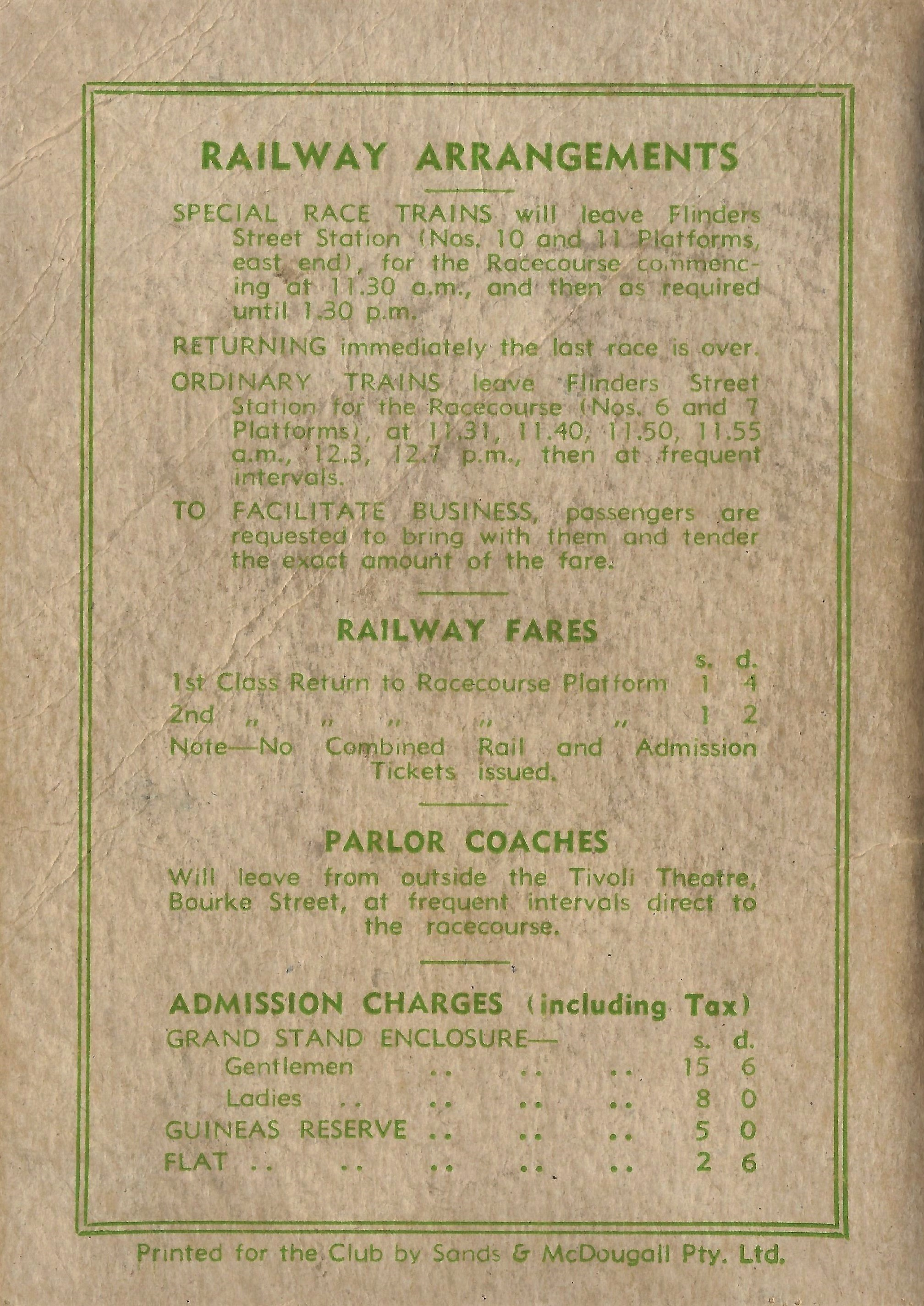
Back cover showing railway & entrance charges

=== Distance ===
- 1884–1972 – 5 1/2 furlongs (~1100 metres)
- 1973–1995 – 1100 metres
- 1996 – 1150 metres
- 1997 onwards – 1100 metres

=== Venue ===
During World War II the event was held at Flemington Racecourse. In 1996 the event was held at Sandown Racecourse due to reconstruction of Caulfield Racecourse. In 2023 the race was run at Sandown Racecourse.

== Winners ==
the following are past winners of the race.

- 2026 - Tropicus
- 2025 - Jimmysstar
- 2024 – Queman
- 2023 – Uncommon James
- 2022 – Marabi
- 2021 – †Celebrity Queen / Portland Sky
- 2020 – Pippie
- 2019 – Booker
- 2018 – Russian Revolution
- 2017 – Sheidel
- 2016 – Flamberge
- 2015 – Shamal Wind
- 2014 – Lankan Rupee
- 2013 – Mrs Onassis
- 2012 – Woorim
- 2011 – Eagle Falls
- 2010 – Starspangledbanner
- 2009 – Swiss Ace
- 2008 – Weekend Hussler
- 2007 – Undue
- 2006 – Snitzel
- 2005 – Fastnet Rock
- 2004 – Reactive
- 2003 – River Dove
- 2002 – Sudurka
- 2001 – Miss Kournikova
- 2000 – Sports
- 1999 – Dantelah
- 1998 – Singing The Blues
- 1997 – Spartacus
- 1996 – Drum
- 1995 – Khaptingly
- 1994 – Kenvain
- 1993 – Mookta
- 1992 – Schillaci
- 1991 – With Me
- 1990 – Scarlet Bisque
- 1989 – Clay Hero
- 1988 – Snippets
- 1987 – Placid Ark
- 1986 – Coal Pak
- 1985 – Mr. Illusion
- 1984 – Mighty Avalanche
- 1983 – Sans Rival
- 1982 – Harpagus
- 1981 – Gleaming Waters
- 1980 – Turf Ruler
- 1979 – Mistress Anne
- 1978 – Hartbalm
- 1977 – Merger
- 1976 – Kentland
- 1975 – Zephyr Bay
- 1974 – Tontonan
- 1973 – Zambari
- 1972 – Dual Choice
- 1971 – Dual Choice
- 1970 – Alrello
- 1969 – Iga Ninja
- 1968 – Magic Ruler
- 1967 – Marmion
- 1966 – Citius
- 1965 – Time And Tide
- 1964 – Pardon Me
- 1963 – Kilshery
- 1962 – New Statesman
- 1961 – Gay Saba
- 1960 – Power Duke
- 1959 – Gold Stakes
- 1958 – Dubbo
- 1957 – Adelina
- 1956 – Lucky Stride
- 1955 – Dicast
- 1954 – Birdwood
- 1953 – Winlake
- 1952 – Cromwell
- 1951 – Regal Scout
- 1950 – Spitfire
- 1949 – San Domenico
- 1948 – Tahmoor
- 1947 – Kind Link
- 1946 – Delina
- 1945 – Ava
- 1944 – Burberry
- 1943 – Millais
- 1942 – High Title
- 1941 – Zonda
- 1940 – Unishak
- 1939 – Aurie's Star
- 1938 – Pamelus
- 1937 – Aurie's Star
- 1936 – Belle Silhouette
- 1935 – Arachne
- 1934 – First Money
- 1933 – Ibrani
- 1932 – †Blematic / Umbertana
- 1931 – †Merab / First Arrow
- 1930 – Figure
- 1929 – Day Dreamer
- 1928 – Euston
- 1927 – Baringhup
- 1926 – Perspective
- 1925 – Adrift
- 1924 – Royal Thought
- 1923 – Chelidon
- 1922 – Wish Wynne
- 1921 – ‡race not held
- 1920 – Molly's Robe
- 1919 – Cielo
- 1918 – Poitrina
- 1917 – Woorak
- 1916 – Tullia
- 1915 – Brattle
- 1914 – Popinjay
- 1913 – Burri
- 1912 – Queen Of Scots
- 1911 – Blairgour
- 1910 – Celerity
- 1909 – Irishman
- 1908 – Bright Steel
- 1907 – Beresina
- 1906 – Wandin
- 1905 – Abington
- 1904 – Silenus
- 1903 – F.J.A
- 1902 – Drawbridge
- 1901 – Wakeful
- 1900 – Veneda
- 1899 – Stand Off
- 1898 – Resolute
- 1897 – So And So
- 1896 – Coil
- 1895 – Wakawatea
- 1894 – Moorite
- 1893 – Lord Hopetoun
- 1892 – Camoola
- 1891 – Wild Rose
- 1890 – Titan
- 1889 – Nectarine
- 1888 – My Lord
- 1887 – Surprise
- 1886 – William Tell
- 1885 – Marie Louise
- 1884 – Malua

† Dead heat
‡ An embargo on Melbourne racing was in force by the Victorian Cabinet

== See also ==
- List of Australian Group races
- Group races
