= Magic Millions =

Horse auctionhouse

Magic Millions Sales Pty Ltd is an Australian Thoroughbred racehorse auction house which holds auctions around Australia each year including its world-famous Gold Coast Yearling Sale at Surfers Paradise in Queensland. Seven days of auctions are joined by a major Thoroughbred horse race meeting where all nine races are only open to horses who were bought at auctions staged by Magic Millions over the previous years. The race events includes the $2 million Magic Millions Classic for two-year-olds - a race which carries a $500,000 bonus for all female raced runners. The Gold Coast Raceday alone boasts prizemoney of $10 million and was the first race meeting held in Australasia with a $10 million total purse.

The Gold Coast Yearling Sale is considered to be a top level auction in global racing circles, with buyers from Hong Kong, Japan, Europe, South Africa, New Zealand, China, the United States and the Middle East. The record for an individual horse purchase as a yearling was made by Patinack Farm twice at the 2008 Magic Millions where that team spent $2.2 million on two Redoute's Choice colts - one a three quarter brother to Dance Hero and one a three quarter brother to their stable star Casino Prince.

The National Sale - comprising weanlings, yearling, broodmares and racehorses - is one of three world's most important breeding stock sales and is held each year in late May and June. The all time auction record for Magic Millions was set in 2016 when outstanding broodmare Listen Here (dam of G1 winner Shooting to Win and G2 winner Deep Field) sold for $3.4 million.

In the late 1990s the auction house was almost bankrupt. It was bought by three business men, the Australian retail entrepreneur and horse breeder Gerry Harvey, Australian advertising entrepreneur John Singleton and Rob Ferguson (former CEO, Bankers Trust). The new ownership group set about reviving the fortunes of the auction. As of 2015, Magic Millions is co-owned by Harvey and his wife and business partner, Katie Page. The company is now owned in its entirety by Gerry Harvey and Katie Page after they purchased interests of the other partners in 2011.

Improved funding, advertising, and networking have contributed to Magic Millions. The profile of the auction has also been helped by the recent development in the breeding world of 'shuttle stallions' - the practise whereby stallions are flown between Australia, Asia, Europe and the US to be bred. Therefore, where a decade ago only Australian champions would have bred progeny on offer in Australia, now there is just as likely to be the offspring of a Kentucky Derby or Prix de l'Arc de Triomphe winner as there is of a Melbourne Cup champion.

Magic Millions has sold many champions over the years including joint world's best turf galloper in 2018 Winx - a $230,000 purchase from the 2013 Gold Coast Yearling Sale who won 25 Group One races and her final 33 races in succession.
