= Magic Millions Classic =

Magic Millions 2YO Classic
- Class: Restricted Listed
- Location: Gold Coast Turf Club
- Race type: Thoroughbred - Flat racing
- Sponsor: TAB (2026)
- Website: www.magicmillions.com.au

Race information
- Distance: 1,200 metres
- Surface: Turf
- Track: Right-handed
- Qualification: Two-year-olds
- Weight: Set weights colts and geldings – 57 kg fillies 55 kg
- Purse: $3,000,000 (2026)

The Magic Millions 2YO Classic is a Gold Coast Turf Club Restricted Listed Thoroughbred horse race. The race is conducted under set weights and is restricted to two year old horses that were bought at a Magic Millions Sale auction. Eligible auctions are held at Gold Coast, Tasmania, Perth and Adelaide.

== History ==
The race was first held in 1987 and has always been held at set weights. The race forms part of the Magic Millions carnival which incorporates the Gold Coast Yearling Sale and the Magic Millions Raceday is fully restricted to horses that have been sold or passed-in at one of the Magic Millions sales. Magic Millions along with Racing Queensland introduced a revamped Queensland Summer Racing Carnival in 2017, increasing the prizemoney on offer to make it Australia's first $10 million raceday. In 1988 the race was split to hold separate sex divisions for fillies and for colts & geldings and in 1991 was reverted to a mixed sex race. Held in January every year, the race is the first of three million dollar races for 2YO's, the other two being the Blue Diamond at Caulfield and the Golden Slipper at Rosehill.

=== Grade ===
- 1987 onwards- Restricted Listed

=== Name ===
- 1987 onwards- Magic Millions 2YO Classic

=== Distance ===
- The race has always been held at 1200m

=== Double winners ===
Thoroughbreds that have won the Magic Millions Classic – the Golden Slipper double

- Capitalist 2016
- Phelan Ready 2009
- Dance Hero 2004

== Winners ==
The following are past winners of the race.

- 2026 - Unit Five
- 2025 - O’Ole
- 2024 - Storm Boy
- 2023 - Skirt the Law
- 2022 - Coolangatta
- 2021 - Shaquero
- 2020 - Away Game
- 2019 - Exhilarates
- 2018 - Sunlight
- 2017 - Houtzen
- 2016 - Capitalist
- 2015 - Le Chef
- 2014 - Unencumbered
- 2013 - Real Surreal
- 2012 - Driefontein
- 2011 - Karuta Queen
- 2010 - Military Rose
- 2009 - Phelan Ready
- 2008 - Augusta Proud
- 2007 - Mimi Lebrock
- 2006 - Mirror Mirror
- 2005 - Bradbury's Luck
- 2004 - Dance Hero
- 2003 - Regimental Gal
- 2002 - Lovely Jubly
- 2001 - Excellerator
- 2000 - Assertive Lad
- 1999 - Testa Rossa
- 1998 - Catnipped
- 1997 - General Nediym
- 1996 - Winger Charger
- 1995 - Zephyrz
- 1994 - Brave Warrior
- 1993 - Our Fiction
- 1992 - Clan O'Sullivan
- 1991 - Bold Promise
- 1990 - St Jude C&G/Dancers Joy F
- 1988 - Sunblazer C&G/Malibu Magic F
- 1988 - Molokai Prince C&G/Sea Cabin F
- 1987 - Snippets

== See also ==
- Karaka Million
- List of Australian Group races
- Group races
