= Redoute's Choice =

Australian-bred Thoroughbred racehorse

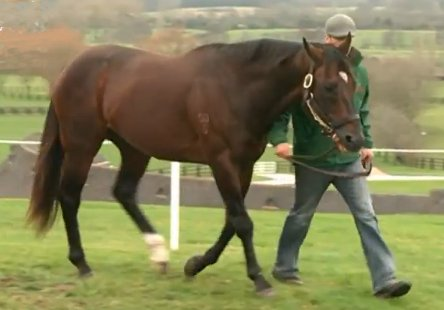
- Sire: Danehill
- Grandsire: Danzig
- Dam: Shantha's Choice
- Damsire: Canny Lad
- Sex: Stallion
- Foaled: 15 August 1996
- Died: 26 March 2019 (aged 22)
- Country: Australia
- Colour: Bay
- Breeder: Muzaffar Ali Yaseen
- Owner: Muzaffar Ali Yaseen; Arrowfield Stud
- Trainer: Rick Hore-Lacy
- Record: 10: 5-1-2
- Earnings: A$1,567,850

Major wins
- Caulfield Guineas (1999); Blue Diamond Stakes (1999); Manikato Stakes (1999); C F Orr Stakes (2000)

Awards
- Australian Champion Stallion (2006, 2010, 2014)
- Last updated on 5 June 2009

Redoute's Choice (15 August 1996 – 26 March 2019) was a multiple Group One-winning Australian Thoroughbred racehorse and also a champion sire. He is by the phenomenal international sire Danehill (USA) out of the lightly raced mare Shantha's Choice (Canny Lad-Dancing Show). His dam is a half-sister to the Group One winners Hurricane Sky (by Star Watch) and Umatilla (by Miswaki (USA)), and later produced the Group One winners Platinum Scissors (also by Danehill) and Manhattan Rain (by Encosta De Lago).

== Racing career ==
Redoute's Choice was raced by his breeder, Sri Lankan businessman Muzaffar Ali Yaseen, and trained by Rick Hore-Lacy. On debut, he won the Listed Veuve Cliquot Stakes (1,100 metres) at Caulfield on 20 February 1999. Seven days later, and starting from a wide barrier, he won the prestigious Blue Diamond Stakes (1,200 metres) by two lengths from his future arch-rival, Testa Rossa, whose preparation for the race had been interrupted by a slight injury. Testa Rossa then won the Sires' Produce Stakes (VRC) before a spell, while Redoute's Choice was promoted to favouritism for the Golden Slipper - the world's richest race for two-year-olds - but was scratched the night before the race due to a raised temperature. Sydney gelding Shogun Lodge ultimately started favourite, while the race was won by another Danehill colt, Catbird.

Redoute's Choice made his return as a spring three-year-old in the Manikato Stakes (1,200 metres) at Moonee Valley. In winning this race, Redoute's Choice made it three stakes wins from as many starts, and became a Group One winner at weight-for-age at just his third start. At his next two starts, he was second-last of five behind the outsider Spargo in the Ascot Vale Stakes (1,200 metres) at Flemington and third behind Testa Rossa in the Invitation Stakes (1,400 metres) at Caulfield. Three weeks later, over an extra 200 metres in the Caulfield Guineas, Redoute's Choice defeated Testa Rossa after a dogged battle down the straight, while another future stallion, Commands, finished third. Two weeks later, Redoute's Choice, Testa Rossa, and Commands lined up in the Cox Plate (2,040 metres), but the relatively poor recent record of three-year-olds continued, with all three finishing unplaced, as the field came in at lengthy intervals behind the champion mare Sunline.

In the new year, Redoute's Choice had three further starts - all in Group One races. He began with a second to Miss Pennymoney in the Australia Stakes (1,200 metres) at Moonee Valley, and was well-ridden in beating the same filly in the C F Orr Stakes (1,400 metres) second-up at Caulfield. At his final start, over the same course, he was third behind Testa Rossa and Miss Pennymoney in the Futurity Stakes. Redoute's Choice retired with career earnings of A$1,567,850.

During this time, Arrowfield Stud had bought a significant share in the colt, and he entered stud later in the year.

== Stud career ==
Redoute's Choice stood at Arrowfield Stud after his retirement in 2000.

=== Notable stock ===
Redoute's Choice has sired 40 individual Group 1 winners

c = colt, f = filly, g = gelding

Foaled	Name	Sex	Major wins
2001	Lotteria	f	Flight Stakes, Myer Classic
2002	Fashions Afield	f	AJC Sires Produce Stakes, Flight Stakes
2002	God's Own	c	Caulfield Guineas
2002	Snitzel	c	Oakleigh Plate
2002	Stratum	c	Golden Slipper Stakes
2002	Undoubtedly	c	Blue Diamond Stakes
2003	Anamato	f	Australasian Oaks
2003	Cheeky Choice	f	Flight Stakes
2003	Empires Choice	c	Queensland Derby
2003	Miss Finland	f	Golden Slipper Stakes, Australian Guineas, VRC Oaks, The Thousand Guineas, Arrowfield Stud Stakes, Memsie Stakes
2003	Nadeem	c	Blue Diamond Stakes
2003	Redoute's Dancer	c	New Zealand Derby
2005	Allez Wonder	f	Toorak Handicap
2005	Gallica	f	The Thousand Guineas, Schweppes Oaks
2005	Master of Design	c	TJ Smith Stakes
2005	Samantha Miss	f	Champagne Stakes, Flight Stakes, VRC Oaks
2006	Dariana	f	Queensland Derby
2006	Melito	f	TJ Smith Stakes, Tattersall's Tiara
2006	Musir	c	Greyville Golden Horseshoe Stakes
2007	Absolutely	f	Australian Oaks
2007	King's Rose	f	New Zealand 1000 Guineas
2008	Bonaria	f	Myer Classic
2009	Lankan Rupee	g	TJ Smith Stakes, Newmarket Stakes, Lightning Stakes, Manikato Stakes, Oakleigh Plate, Rubiton Stakes
2009	Royal Descent	f	Australian Oaks
2009	Wylie Hall	c	South African Derby, Turffontein Presidents Champions Challenge
2011	Hampton Court	c	Spring Champion Stakes
2011	Majmu	f	Kenilworth Cape Fillies Guineas, Turffontein Empress Club Stakes
2011	Peeping	f	Coolmore Classic
2012	Abbey Maree	f	Schweppes Oaks
2012	Galaxy Star	f	Railway Stakes
2012	Howard Be Thy Name	c	South Australian Derby
2012	Rafeef	c	Turffontein Computaform Sprint
2014	Mustaaqeem	c	Turffontein South African Nursery
2015	Danceteria	g	Grosser Dallmayr-Preis
2015	The Autumn Sun	c	Golden Rose Stakes, Randwick Guineas, Rosehill Guineas, Caulfield Guineas, The J. J. Atkins
2016	Alabama Express	c	C F Orr Stakes
2016	Celebrity Queen	f	Oakleigh Plate
2016	Loire	f	New Zealand 1000 Guineas
2017	King's Legacy	c	Sires' Produce Stakes, Champagne Stakes
2019	Rediener	g	Epsom Handicap

Redoute's Choice was crowned champion first season sire in Australia in 2004 and champion sire in 2006. With ten crops of racing age, Redoute's Choice established himself as the heir apparent (in Australia) to his champion sire Danehill, and his fee was A$137,500. He excelled as a sire of two-year-olds - with quinellas in the Golden Slipper and the Blue Diamond and a trifecta in the Magic Millions on the Gold Coast - and also produced Group One-winning three- and four-year-olds.

Redoute's Choice produced about 150 stakeswinners and 30 Group 1 winners including Miss Finland, The Autumn Sun, Lotteria, God's Own, Snitzel, Stratum, Fashions Afield, Nadeem, Undoubtedly, Bradbury's Luck, Samantha Miss, and Cheeky Choice. Six of his sons have also sired G1 winners: Not A Single Doubt (Miracles of Life and Always Certain); Stratum (Streama, Southern Lord, Crystal Lily); Snitzel (Sizzling, Shamus Award); Duelled (Shootoff); Fast 'n Famous (Quintessential); Bradbury's Luck (Luckygray). ASB - SW progeny

Redoute's Choice was also dominant in the sales ring, having led the sale averages at the Australian Easter Yearling Sales for nine consecutive years.

In 2013 Redoute's Choice stood his first season at the Aga Khan IV Stud's Haras de Bonneval in France. He covered a blueblood book of mares during his first European breeding season including Zarkava- the unbeaten 2008 European Horse of the Year, Group 1 winner Alpine Rose, Born Gold - the dam of 2010 European Horse of the Year [Goldikova] and G1 winner Galikova, dual G1 winner Shareta, Forest Pearl - dam of Champion Miss Finland, G1 winner Vadawina and G1 winner Rosanara.

Arrowfield Stud announced the death of Redoute's Choice on 26 March 2019 at the age of 22. The horse was humanely euthanized after suffering a loss of mobility which could not be restored.

== Pedigree ==
Pedigree of Redoute's Choice (AUS)
Sire Danehill (USA) 1986	Danzig (USA); 1977	Northern Dancer (CAN); 1961	Nearctic (CAN); 1954
Sire Danehill (USA) 1986	Danzig (USA); 1977	Northern Dancer (CAN); 1961	Natalma (USA); 1957
Sire Danehill (USA) 1986	Danzig (USA); 1977	Pas de Nom (USA); 1968	Admiral's Voyage (USA); 1959
Sire Danehill (USA) 1986	Danzig (USA); 1977	Pas de Nom (USA); 1968	Petitioner (GB); 1952
Sire Danehill (USA) 1986	Razyana (USA); 1981	His Majesty (USA); 1968	Ribot (GB); 1952
Sire Danehill (USA) 1986	Razyana (USA); 1981	His Majesty (USA); 1968	Flower Bowl (USA); 1952
Sire Danehill (USA) 1986	Razyana (USA); 1981	Spring Adieu (CAN); 1974	Buckpasser (USA); 1963
Sire Danehill (USA) 1986	Razyana (USA); 1981	Spring Adieu (CAN); 1974	Natalma (USA); 1957
Dam Shantha's Choice (AUS) 1992	Canny Lad (AUS); 1987	Bletchingly (AUS); 1970	Biscay (AUS); 1965
Dam Shantha's Choice (AUS) 1992	Canny Lad (AUS); 1987	Bletchingly (AUS); 1970	Coogee (GB); 1959
Dam Shantha's Choice (AUS) 1992	Canny Lad (AUS); 1987	Jesmond Lass (AUS); 1975	Lunchtime (GB); 1970
Dam Shantha's Choice (AUS) 1992	Canny Lad (AUS); 1987	Jesmond Lass (AUS); 1975	Beautiful Dreamer (AUS); 1967
Dam Shantha's Choice (AUS) 1992	Dancing Show (USA); 1983	Nijinsky II (CAN); 1967	Northern Dancer (CAN); 1961
Dam Shantha's Choice (AUS) 1992	Dancing Show (USA); 1983	Nijinsky II (CAN); 1967	Flaming Page (CAN); 1959
Dam Shantha's Choice (AUS) 1992	Dancing Show (USA); 1983	Show Lady (USA); 1976	Sir Ivor (USA); 1965
Dam Shantha's Choice (AUS) 1992	Dancing Show (USA); 1983	Show Lady (USA); 1976	Best in Show (USA); 1965
