= Blue Diamond Stakes =

- Class: Group 1
- Location: Caulfield Racecourse
- Inaugurated: 1971
- Race type: Thoroughbred
- Sponsor: Sportsbet (2026)

Race information
- Distance: 1,200 metres
- Surface: Turf
- Qualification: Two year old
- Weight: Set weights colts and geldings – 56 1/2 kg fillies – 54 1/2 kg
- Purse: $2,000,000 (2026)

The Blue Diamond Stakes is a Melbourne Racing Club Group 1 Thoroughbred horse race for two-year-olds, at set weights, run over 1200 metres at Caulfield Racecourse in Melbourne, Victoria, Australia.

== History ==
Prizemoney was increased from $1 million to $1.5 million in 2016 and to $2 million in 2023.

=== Distance ===
- 1971–1972 – 6 furlongs (~1200 metres)
- 1973 onwards – 1200 metres

=== Venue ===
In 1996 the event was held at Flemington Racecourse due to reconstruction of Caulfield Racecourse. In 2023 the race was run at Sandown Racecourse.

=== Records ===
- Trainer: David Hayes – 5 wins
- Jockey: Dwayne Dunn – 4 wins
- Time: Hurricane Sky (1994): 1:08.1

== Winners ==
The following are past winners of the race.

- 2026 – Streisand
- 2025 – Devil Night
- 2024 – Hayasugi
- 2023 – Little Brose
- 2022 – Daumier
- 2021 – Artorius
- 2020 – Tagaloa
- 2019 – Lyre
- 2018 – Written By
- 2017 – Catchy
- 2016 – Extreme Choice
- 2015 – Pride Of Dubai
- 2014 – Earthquake
- 2013 – Miracles Of Life
- 2012 – Samaready
- 2011 – Sepoy
- 2010 – Star Witness
- 2009 – Reward For Effort
- 2008 – Reaan
- 2007 – Sleek Chassis
- 2006 – Nadeem
- 2005 – Undoubtedly
- 2004 – Alinghi
- 2003 – †Kusi
- 2002 – Bel Esprit
- 2001 – True Jewels
- 2000 – Road To Success
- 1999 – Redoute's Choice
- 1998 – Danelagh
- 1997 – Knowledge
- 1996 – Paint
- 1995 – Principality
- 1994 – Hurricane Sky
- 1993 – Lady Jakeo
- 1992 – Riva Diva
- 1991 – Canonise
- 1990 – Mahaasin
- 1989 – Courtza
- 1988 – Zeditave
- 1987 – Midnight Fever
- 1986 – Bounding Away
- 1985 – Let's Get Physical
- 1984 – Street Cafe
- 1983 – Love A Show
- 1982 – Rancher
- 1981 – Black Shoes
- 1980 – Aare
- 1979 – Star Shower
- 1978 – Manikato
- 1977 – Blazing Saddles
- 1976 – Out Of Danger
- 1975 – Lord Dudley
- 1974 – Forina
- 1973 – New Gleam
- 1972 – John's Hope
- 1971 – Tolerance

† Roedean finished first but was later disqualified for returning a positive swab

== See also ==
- List of Australian Group races
- Group races
