= Golden Slipper Stakes =

- Class: Group 1
- Location: Rosehill Gardens Racecourse
- Inaugurated: 1957
- Race type: Thoroughbred - flat
- Sponsor: TAB (2024-2026)

Race information
- Distance: 1,200 metres
- Surface: Turf
- Track: Right-handed
- Qualification: Two year old
- Weight: Set Weights colts and geldings - 56 1/2 kg fillies 54 1/2 kg
- Purse: A$5,000,000 (2026)

The Golden Slipper Stakes is an Australian Turf Club Group 1 Thoroughbred horse race for two-year-old horses run over 1,200 metres on turf at set weights conditions, held at Rosehill Gardens Racecourse in Sydney, Australia. It is the premier two year old race in Australia and is the world's richest race for two-year-old Thoroughbreds.

== History ==
The first Golden Slipper Stakes took place in 1957 and was won by Todman, by Star Kingdom, who also sired the next four winners of the Golden Slipper, Skyline (1958), Fine and Dandy (1959), Sky High (1960) and Magic Night (1961). Star Kingdom bloodlines can still be found in many of today's winners. In 1986 it became the first race in New South Wales to have A$1 million in prize money.

From 2009 to 2014 the race was held on the first Saturday in April. In 2008 it was held in mid-April - four weeks after Easter in March. Prior to 2008, the race was held on the Saturday before Good Friday in conjunction with a series of races known as the Golden Slipper Carnival.

=== Distance ===
- 1957–1972 - 6 furlongs (~1200 metres)
- 1973 onwards - 1200 metres

=== Grade ===
- 1957–1978 - Principal Race
- 1979 onwards - Group 1

== Records ==
Trainers with most wins:

- 8 - Gai Waterhouse (2001, 2004, 2008, 2012, 2013, 2015 and with Adrian Bott in 2020 and 2024)
- 6 - T. J. Smith (1971, 1972, 1974, 1975, 1986 and 1988)
- 6 - Freedman brothers: Lee (1993, 1994, 1995, 1996), Richard & Michael (2021) and Michael (2025)
- 4 - Bart Cummings (1966, 1973, 1976 and 1979)
- 4 - Clarry Conners (1991, 1992, 1998 and 2000)

Jockeys with most wins:

- 4 - Shane Dye (1989, 1990, 1991 and 1992)
- 4 - Ron Quinton (1982, 1983, 1985 and 1987)
- 3 - Tommy Berry (2013, 2015 and 2021)
- 3 - Mick Dittman (1981, 1986 and 1993)
- 3 - Kevin Langby (1972, 1974 and 1975)
- 3 - Athol Mulley (1958, 1960 and 1964)

== Winners ==
The following are past winners of the race.

- 2026 - Guest House
- 2025 - Marhoona
- 2024 - Lady Of Camelot
- 2023 - Shinzo
- 2022 - Fireburn
- 2021 - Stay Inside
- 2020 - Farnan
- 2019 - Kiamichi
- 2018 - Estijaab
- 2017 - She Will Reign
- 2016 - Capitalist
- 2015 - Vancouver
- 2014 - Mossfun
- 2013 - Overreach
- 2012 - Pierro
- 2011 - Sepoy
- 2010 - Crystal Lily
- 2009 - Phelan Ready
- 2008 - Sebring
- 2007 - Forensics
- 2006 - Miss Finland
- 2005 - Stratum
- 2004 - Dance Hero
- 2003 - Polar Success
- 2002 - Calaway Gal
- 2001 - Ha Ha
- 2000 - Belle Du Jour
- 1999 - Catbird
- 1998 - Prowl
- 1997 - Guineas
- 1996 - Merlene
- 1995 - Flying Spur
- 1994 - Danzero
- 1993 - Bint Marscay
- 1992 - Burst
- 1991 - Tierce
- 1990 - Canny Lad
- 1989 - Courtza
- 1988 - Star Watch
- 1987 - Marauding
- 1986 - Bounding Away
- 1985 - Rory's Jester
- 1984 - Inspired
- 1983 - Sir Dapper
- 1982 - Marscay
- 1981 - Full On Aces
- 1980 - Dark Eclipse
- 1979 - Century Miss
- 1978 - Manikato
- 1977 - Luskin Star
- 1976 - Vivarchi
- 1975 - Toy Show
- 1974 - Hartshill
- 1973 - Tontonan
- 1972 - John's Hope
- 1971 - Fairy Walk
- 1970 - Baguette
- 1969 - Vain
- 1968 - Royal Parma
- 1967 - Sweet Embrace
- 1966 - Storm Queen
- 1965 - Reisling
- 1964 - Eskimo Prince
- 1963† - Pago Pago
- 1962 - Birthday Card
- 1961 - Magic Night
- 1960 - Sky High
- 1959 - Fine And Dandy
- 1958 - Skyline
- 1957 - Todman

† Initially scheduled for 23 March 1963 but the meeting was abandoned due to wet track conditions. Race was held 27 March 1963

== See also ==
- Birthday Card Stakes
- Epona Stakes
- George Ryder Stakes
- Ranvet Stakes
- Rosehill Guineas
- The Galaxy (ATC)
- List of Australian Group races
- Group races
