= Commands (horse) =

Australian Thoroughbred racehorse

- Sire: Danehill
- Grandsire: Danzig
- Dam: Cotehele House
- Damsire: My Swanee
- Sex: Stallion
- Foaled: 28 September 1996
- Died: 12 July 2014 (aged 17)
- Country: Australia
- Colour: Bay
- Breeder: Arrowfield Stud
- Owner: Jack Ingham; Bob Ingham; Darley Stud
- Trainer: John Hawkes
- Jockey: Larry Cassidy; Darren Gauci
- Record: 15: 4–1–4
- Earnings: AU$417,231

Major wins
- Missile Stakes (1999)

Commands (28 September 1996 – 12 July 2014) was an Australian stakes winning racehorse and stallion.

== Background ==
Bred by Arrowfield Stud in the Hunter Valley of New South Wales, Commands was a full brother to 5-time Group One winner Danewin.

== Racing career ==
Commands won 4 races in his 15 start career with the highlight being the 1999 Missile Stakes at Rosehill as a two-year-old, beating the older horses at Weight for Age.

He also ran placings in two Group One races, running third behind Redoute's Choice in the 1999 Caulfield Guineas and a second placing in The Galaxy.

== Stud career ==
Commands was retired to the Inghams' Woodlands Stud and in his first year in 2000 had a service fee of $10,000.

Darley Stud acquired ownership of Commands in 2008 following the purchase of the Inghams' breeding empire in Australia.

Commands retired from stallion duties in 2013. He is the sire of 14 time Group One winner Melody Belle. Overall he sired 13 individual Group One winners, and been Australia's "Leading Sire by Winners" on 3 consecutive occasions.

Commands died suddenly on the 12 July 2014 at Darley's Kelvinside property in New South Wales aged 17.

=== Notable progeny ===
Commands' Group One winners:

c = colt, f = filly, g = gelding

Foaled	Name	Sex	Major wins
2001	Undue	g	Doomben 10,000, Oakleigh Plate
2002	Paratroopers	g	All Aged Stakes
2004	Russeting	f	Winter Stakes
2005	Purple	f	Vinery Stud Stakes, Queensland Oaks
2007	Erewhon	g	Spring Champion Stakes
2007	Skilled	c	Champagne Stakes
2008	Appearance	f	Myer Classic, Coolmore Classic, Queen of the Turf Stakes, Canterbury Stakes
2009	Commanding Jewel	f	The Thousand Guineas
2009	Epaulette	c	Golden Rose Stakes, Doomben 10,000
2012	Holler	c	Canterbury Stakes
2013	Manuel	g	C F Orr Stakes
2014	Bella Vella	f	Robert Sangster Stakes
2014	Melody Belle	f	Manawatu Sires Produce Stakes, Tarzino Trophy (twice), Windsor Park Plate (three times), BCD Group Sprint, Haunui Farm Classic, New Zealand Stakes (twice), Livamol Spring Classic (twice), Empire Rose Stakes, Thorndon Mile

== Pedigree ==
Pedigree of Commands (AUS)
Sire Danehill (USA) 1986	Danzig (USA); 1977	Northern Dancer	Nearctic
Sire Danehill (USA) 1986	Danzig (USA); 1977	Northern Dancer	Natalma
Sire Danehill (USA) 1986	Danzig (USA); 1977	Pas de Nom	Admiral's Voyage
Sire Danehill (USA) 1986	Danzig (USA); 1977	Pas de Nom	Petitioner
Sire Danehill (USA) 1986	Razyana (USA); 1981	His Majesty	Ribot
Sire Danehill (USA) 1986	Razyana (USA); 1981	His Majesty	Flower Bowl
Sire Danehill (USA) 1986	Razyana (USA); 1981	Spring Adieu	Buckpasser
Sire Danehill (USA) 1986	Razyana (USA); 1981	Spring Adieu	Natalma
Dam Cotehele House (GB) 1980	My Swanee (GB); 1963	Petition	Fair Trial
Dam Cotehele House (GB) 1980	My Swanee (GB); 1963	Petition	Art Paper
Dam Cotehele House (GB) 1980	My Swanee (GB); 1963	Grey Rhythm	Grey Sovereign
Dam Cotehele House (GB) 1980	My Swanee (GB); 1963	Grey Rhythm	Metronome
Dam Cotehele House (GB) 1980	Eight Carat (GB); 1975	Pieces of Eight	Relic
Dam Cotehele House (GB) 1980	Eight Carat (GB); 1975	Pieces of Eight	Baby Doll
Dam Cotehele House (GB) 1980	Eight Carat (GB); 1975	Klairessa	Klairon
Dam Cotehele House (GB) 1980	Eight Carat (GB); 1975	Klairessa	Courtessa
