= Blue Diamond Preview Fillies =

Horse race

Blue Diamond Preview (Fillies)
- Class: Group 3
- Location: Caulfield Racecourse
- Inaugurated: 1982 (Listed race)
- Race type: Thoroughbred
- Sponsor: Sportsbet (2026)

Race information
- Distance: 1,000 metres
- Surface: Turf
- Track: Left-handed
- Qualification: Two year old fillies
- Weight: Set weights with penalties
- Purse: $250,000 (2026)

The Blue Diamond Preview (Fillies) is a Melbourne Racing Club Group 3 Thoroughbred horse race, raced under set weights with penalties conditions for two-year-old fillies, over a distance of 1000 metres run at Caulfield Racecourse in Melbourne, Australia in late January.

== History ==
The race is considered a lead-up to the Group 2 Blue Diamond Prelude Fillies the following month and both races are used as lead-up races to the Group 1 Blue Diamond Stakes in late February at Caulfield. The race is usually held on the Australia Day public holiday.
Along with this event the Listed race Blue Diamond Preview for colts and geldings is held on the same day.

Fillies that have captured the Blue Diamond Preview – Blue Diamond Stakes double are:

- Bounding Away (1986)
- Hayasugi (2024)
- Miracles Of Life (2013)

=== Name ===
Prior to 1996, the race was known as Blue Diamond Prelude (Filly) and was run at Sandown Racecourse, but was not to be confused with the Blue Diamond Prelude Fillies run at Caulfield Racecourse a couple of weeks later at a distance of 1,100 metres.

=== Grade ===
- 1982–1987 - Listed race
- 1988–2005 - Group 3
- 2006–2014 - Listed race
- 2015 onwards - Group 3

=== Distance ===
- 1982–1983 – 1200 metres
- 1984 onwards - 1000 metres

=== Venue ===
- 1988–1996 - Sandown Racecourse
- 1997–2005 - Caulfield Racecourse
- 2006 - Sandown Racecourse
- 2007–2014 - Caulfield Racecourse
- 2015 - Sandown Racecourse
- 2016–2024 - Caulfield Racecourse
- 2025 - Sandown Racecourse

== Winners ==
The following are past winners of the race.

- 2026 - Rubi's Choice
- 2025 - My Gladiola
- 2024 - Hayasugi
- 2023 - De Sonic Boom
- 2022 - Miss Roseiano
- 2021 - Dosh
- 2020 - A Beautiful Night
- 2019 - Catch Me
- 2018 - Lady Horseowner
- 2017 - Limestone
- 2016 - Sword Of Light
- 2015 - Fontiton
- 2014 - Eloping
- 2013 - Miracles Of Life
- 2012 - Malasun
- 2011 - One Last Dance
- 2010 - Crystal Lily
- 2009 - Rostova
- 2008 - Siennas Fury
- 2007 - Beauty School
- 2006 - Jumlah
- 2005 - †Void Race
- 2004 - World Peace
- 2003 - Halibery
- 2002 - Bardego Barathea
- 2001 - Ashkaleta
- 2000 - Ponton Flyer
- 1999 - Northeast Sheila
- 1998 - Compulsion
- 1997 - Scandinavia
- 1996 - Our Cashel
- 1995 - Danaides
- 1994 - Tennessee Morn
- 1993 - Rosas Image
- 1992 - Castle Pines
- 1991 - Irises
- 1990 - Triscay
- 1989 - Confederate Lady
- 1988 - Scarlet Bisque
- 1987 - Midnight Fever
- 1986 - Bounding Away
- 1983 - Worth
- 1982 - Olive Branch

† The 2005 race was declared a "No Race" after stewards deemed two runners had gained a "flying start" after bursting through the stalls moments before the gates opened.

== See also ==
- Manfred Stakes
- List of Australian Group races
- Group races
