= Lyre (horse) =

Australian-bred Thoroughbred racehorse

- Sire: Lonhro
- Grandsire: Octagonal
- Dam: Erato
- Damsire: Street Cry
- Sex: Filly
- Foaled: 25 September 2016
- Country: Australia
- Colour: Brown
- Breeder: Godolphin
- Owner: Godolphin
- Trainer: Anthony Freedman
- Record: 25: 3-7-2
- Earnings: A$1,783,015

Major wins
- Blue Diamond Prelude Fillies (G2)(2019); Blue Diamond Stakes (G1)(2019)
- Last updated on 3 March 2020

Lyre (foaled 25 September 2016) is a Thoroughbred racehorse trained and bred in Australia. She has won a Group One race, and over a million dollars.

== Career ==
A Godolphin-owned and -bred horse, Lyre was one of six yearlings that was placed with Anthony Freedman rather than the usual stable of James Cummings, and the first of them to race.

Lyre made her debut at Caulfield on New Years Day 2019, finishing 5th. On 20 January, she had her first win in a maiden at Sale. Freedman Racing Manager Brad Taylor said, "She took a while to warm up there but was really good through the line. When she hit the front she still wanted to wobble around about so there's still plenty of prep to come."

Jumping at $26 in the Blue Diamond Prelude Fillies, she won by a long neck. Freedman said, "She's improving all the time. The win at Sale had merit as she just didn't know how to put them away she's gone on with it and then she went to the farm and put a lot of weight on... we’ve always had a fair opinion of her." A fortnight later, she "stormed home" to win $900,000 in the Group 1 Blue Diamond Stakes. Freedman said, "She's a quality filly. She was unlucky in her first run, arguably she could be unbeaten. She's kept coming and coming and improving. They ran fairly good time, and she was the strongest."

Running third in the Golden Slipper Stakes to $30 Kiamachi, Lyre was part of a trifecta for the Godolphin stable, coming from 12th with 400 metres to run.

Spelling until the 2019/20 racing year, Lyre returned in the Group 3 Quezette Stakes on 27 August, finishing a "credible" fourth. She was scratched from the Danehill Stakes when the stable said she "didn't scope up to scratch", but a week later came second behind William Thomas at Caulfield. She contested a further two group races in this campaign, failing to place.

After a four-month spell, Lyre returned in the Group 2 Light Fingers Stakes, finishing second in a Godolphin trifecta. She then finished fourth in the Surround Stakes on 29 February 2020.

== Pedigree ==
Pedigree of Lyre (AUS) 2016
Sire Lonhro (AUS) 1998	Octagonal (NZ); 1992	Zabeel	Sir Tristram
Sire Lonhro (AUS) 1998	Octagonal (NZ); 1992	Zabeel	Lady Giselle
Sire Lonhro (AUS) 1998	Octagonal (NZ); 1992	Eight Carat	Pieces of Eight
Sire Lonhro (AUS) 1998	Octagonal (NZ); 1992	Eight Carat	Klairessa
Sire Lonhro (AUS) 1998	Shadea (NZ); 1998	Straight Strike	Mr. Prospector
Sire Lonhro (AUS) 1998	Shadea (NZ); 1998	Straight Strike	Bend Not
Sire Lonhro (AUS) 1998	Shadea (NZ); 1998	Concia	First Consul
Sire Lonhro (AUS) 1998	Shadea (NZ); 1998	Concia	My Tricia
Dam Erato (AUS) 2010	Street Cry (IRE); 1998	Machiavellian	Mr. Prospector
Dam Erato (AUS) 2010	Street Cry (IRE); 1998	Machiavellian	Coup de Folie
Dam Erato (AUS) 2010	Street Cry (IRE); 1998	Helen Street	Troy
Dam Erato (AUS) 2010	Street Cry (IRE); 1998	Helen Street	Waterway
Dam Erato (AUS) 2010	Mnemosyne (AUS); 2002	Encosta De Lago	Fairy King
Dam Erato (AUS) 2010	Mnemosyne (AUS); 2002	Encosta De Lago	Shoal Creek
Dam Erato (AUS) 2010	Mnemosyne (AUS); 2002	My Juliet	Canny Lad
Dam Erato (AUS) 2010	Mnemosyne (AUS); 2002	My Juliet	Perfect Draw
