= Lonhro =

Australian-bred Thoroughbred racehorse (1998–2024)

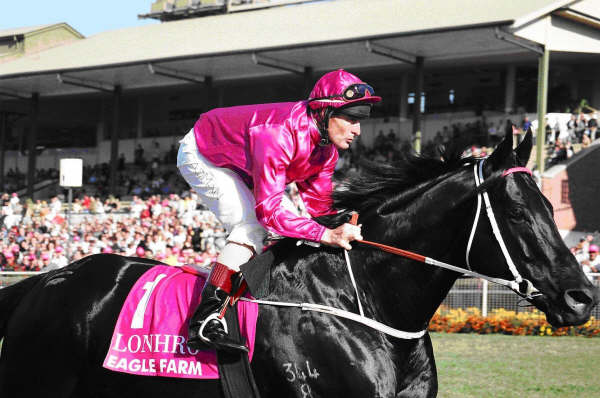
- Farewelling the crowd at Eagle Farm
- Sire: Octagonal
- Grandsire: Zabeel
- Dam: Shadea
- Damsire: Straight Strike
- Sex: Stallion
- Foaled: 10 December 1998
- Died: 19 April 2024 (25yo)
- Country: Australia
- Colour: Brown
- Breeder: Woodlands Stud
- Owner: Woodlands Stud
- Trainer: John Hawkes
- Jockey: Darren Beadman
- Record: 35: 26-3-2
- Earnings: A$5,790,510

Major wins
- Caulfield Guineas (2001); Caulfield Stakes (2002 & 2003); LKS Mackinnon Stakes (2002); Chipping Norton Stakes (2003); George Ryder Stakes (2003 & 2004); Queen Elizabeth Stakes (2003); George Main Stakes (2003); C F Orr Stakes (2004); Australian Cup (2004)

Awards
- Australian Champion Three Year Old (2002); Australian Champion Middle Distance Racehorse (2004); Australian Champion Racehorse of the Year (2004); World Champion Miler (2004); Australian Champion Stallion (2011); Timeform Rating: 128

Honours
- Australian Racing Hall of Fame (2014)
- Last updated on 20 October 2025

Lonhro (10 December 1998 – 19 April 2024), nicknamed The Black Flash, was an Australian champion racehorse. He was from the first crop of the champion Octagonal out of the Group One-placed Shadea (by Straight Strike), who also produced the Group One winner Niello (a younger, full-brother to Lonhro). Lonhro raced from two to five years of age and won 26 races, including 25 stakes races, ranging in distance from 1,100 to 2,000 metres. These included 11 Group One wins and 18 wins at weight-for-age. He was bred and owned by Woodlands Stud and trained by John Hawkes. Lonhro's name is based on the stock exchange code of the London Rhodesian Mining and Land Company, LONRHO. This arose from his foaling description as "tiny but perfect", a label ascribed to Roland "Tiny" Rowland, CEO of the company. The horse's name is deliberately misspelt. Lonhro died on 19 April 2024, at the age of 25.

== Racing career ==
=== Two-year-old season: 2000–2001 ===
Lonhro had his first start in November 2000 in a restricted two-year-old race at Rosehill, where he finished second. A short spell followed, and he resumed in January 2001 over 1,100 m at Rosehill, starting favourite for the first time and winning by 2½ lengths. Two weeks later, Lonhro was in Melbourne at Caulfield for the Blue Diamond Prelude. In the straight, he strode well clear to win by two lengths from the fast-finishing Neiwand with Tosamba third.

It was then on to the Blue Diamond Stakes, where Lonhro started the $3.50 favourite. Settling near the rear of the field, he came wide in the straight, making ground on the leaders but unable to catch the eventual winner, True Jewels, finishing 1½ lengths fourth. Instead of pressing on to the Sydney carnival, Lonhro was spelled as another near-black Woodlands colt called Viscount won the AJC Sires Produce and Champagne Stakes.

Lonhro returned for the 2001 Spring in the WFA Missile Stakes in July, when he was still officially a 2-year-old. Settling last of nine runners on a heavy track, he stormed home to finish third to Sportsbrat. This was the only time that Lonhro was defeated in consecutive races.

=== Three-year-old season: 2001–2002 ===
A rematch with Sportsbrat in the WFA Warwick Stakes-Gr2 (1,300 m) followed two weeks later. This time, Lonhro settled closer to the lead and registered his first win as a 3-year-old. For his next start, he went back to his own age group in the Ming Dynasty Quality-Gr3 (1,400 m) and held on to win by a short half-head after being sent out a very short-priced favourite. An easy win in the Heritage Stakes-LR (1,200 m) followed before he took out the Stan Fox Stakes-Gr2 (1,400 m) against a small but quality field.

Lonhro then headed to Melbourne for the Caulfield Guineas-Gr1 (1,600 m) but despite his four consecutive wins he was not the Hawkes' stable's favoured runner. That honour went to the multiple Group 1 winner Viscount, who had started his spring campaign in Sydney and won the George Main Stakes-Gr1 (1,600 m) where he, like Lonhro, defeated Shogun Lodge. In the Caulfield Guineas, the boom colts Ustinov and Viking Ruler also lined up along with New Zealander Pure Theatre, Dash for Cash and Magic Albert. Lonhro settled last before pulling out wide to the centre of the track to start his run on the home turn. Inside the final 50 metres, he swept to the front from Pure Theatre and Ustinov as Viking Ruler ran on near the rails. Lonhro won by 1½ lengths from Ustinov with Pure Theatre third.

After the victory, it was reported that Lonhro had suffered an injury with a minor wrench to a joint and it was felt in his best interests to spell for the autumn, meaning he would miss the W. S. Cox Plate. Stablemate Viscount who was well beaten in the Caulfield Guineas, went on to Moonee Valley and finished third to Northerly and Sunline, defeated a length in a rough-house finish that was the subject of a long protest hearing.

On 2 February 2002, Lonhro lined up as the odds-on favourite for the Royal Sovereign Stakes-Gr2 (1,200 m), beginning a run of 25 consecutive races that he started as favourite. He easily accounted for the small field before going on to win the Hobartville Stakes-Gr2 (1,400 m) at his next start. He was installed as pre-post favourite for the Doncaster Handicap and a nominal favourite for many of the big races of the autumn, but it was announced soon after that Lonhro had contracted a virus and the resultant delay in his preparation saw the 3-year-old spelled until his four-year-old season.

=== Four-year-old season: 2002–2003 ===
Lonhro returned as a 4-year-old in the Missile S-Gr3 (1,100 m) at Rosehill. This was the first race where he was ridden by Darren Beadman, and it was his eighth consecutive victory as he won by four lengths. As the short priced favourite, Lonhro was expected to have no problem taking out the Warwick S-Gr2 (1,400 m) at his next start but was beaten a half head by Defier. Two weeks later, he won the Chelmsford S-Gr2 (1,600 m) at Randwick by three lengths. At his next start, only six horses lined up for the George Main Stakes-Gr1 (1,600 m) but it was described as a mini Cox Plate with Sunline, Defier, Lonhro, Excellerator and Shogun Lodge entered. Lonhro was pocketed on the fence for much of the race and only saw daylight in the last 50 m, sprinting home to finish fourth. Sunline set a moderate pace in front from Defier, then Shogun Lodge outside Lonhro with Hey Pronto and Excellerator at the rear.

Lonhro was then sent to Melbourne for a rematch with Sunline in the Caulfield Stakes-Gr1 (2,000 m). A field of seven lined up, but all race discussions were whether Sunline as a 7-year-old would return to form and if Lonhro, having his first start beyond 1,600 m, would be as effective over 2,000 m. Sunline assumed her usual front running style, and Lonhro stalked for most of the race in about third position. Little changed up to the 800 m where Sunline quickened from Ustinov, and Lonhro started the long chase with Distinctly Secret heading the rest. Around the turn, Sunline raced clear of Ustinov with Lonhro steadily making ground but giving the mare a huge head start. By the 300 m, Sunline was over three lengths clear as Lonhro settled into his task. Inside the final 50 m, Sunline and Lonhro were level with the mare fighting back strongly, but her younger rival edged in front to win by a half neck in race record time of 2:00:60.

Both horses then headed to the WS Cox Plate two weeks later where Lonhro started $4 equal favourite with Northerly. Settling last in a field of nine, Lonhro was beaten, finishing 7.3 lengths behind Northerly. Lonhro backed up a week later in the Mackinnon S-Gr1 (2,000 m) at Flemington, edging out Royal Code to finish his 2002 spring campaign on a winning note.

Lonhro resumed in the 2003 autumn winning in the Expressway S-Gr2 (1,200 m) by 2 lengths. Three weeks later, he won the Apollo S-Gr2 (1,400 m) by 3½ lengths with a further 2 lengths to third. He was back a week later in the Chipping Norton Stakes-Gr1 (1,600 m) at Warwick Farm, coming away to win under hands and heels riding by 1½ lengths from Shogun Lodge. Next on the agenda was the George Ryder S-Gr1 (1,500 m) at Rosehill where Lonhro again won easily, this time by a 2-length margin. He was the raging favourite for the Doncaster Handicap-Gr1 (1,600 m) at Randwick, where he carried topweight of 57.5 kg. Defier and Shogun Lodge looked to be his main dangers, but then the rain fell and both his rivals were scratched when the track was rated officially slow. Inside the final 200 m, Grand Armee, carrying 6 kg less than Lonhro, hit the front and raced clear to pass the post three lengths ahead of Dash For Cash with two lengths to Boreale, who held out Lonhro for third. This was Lonhro's third and final unplaced run in a race.

Lonhro rounded out his autumn a week later in the Queen Elizabeth Stakes-Gr1 (2,000 m), winning by 1½ lengths.

There was brief speculation that Lonhro might be retired to stud, but it was soon announced that he would return to racing as a 5-year-old with the WS Cox Plate his spring target. Lonhro's part owner Jack Ingham died after a long battle with illness in August 2003 as Lonhro prepared to return to racing.

=== Five-year-old season: 2003–2004 ===
In August 2003, Lonhro began his 5-year-old season with his second win in the AJC Warwick S-Gr2 (1,400 m). Two weeks later, it was on to the Chelmsford S-Gr2 (1,600 m) where he again won. The WFA George Main Stakes-Gr1 (1,600 m) at Randwick and a rematch with Grand Armee was next. In a slowly run race, Lonhro defeated Grand Armee by three lengths, with a further two lengths to the previous year's winner, Defier, in third. It was then back to Melbourne for the Caulfield Stakes-Gr1 (2,000 m), where Lonhro beat Mummify. Winning by two lengths, he became the first horse to win consecutive Caulfield Stakes since Kingston Town in 1981 and 1982.

Two weeks later, Lonhro looked invincible in the Cox Plate-Gr1 (2,040 m) with recent stars Sunline and Northerly missing and only Defier and Fields of Omagh joining Lonhro from the 2002 field. There were doubts over Lonhro handling the Moonee Valley surface, but his class was expected to overcome any problems. Then, in the 40 minutes before the race, it began to rain, continuing through to the race itself. The track was dead but soggy. In the running, Fields of Omagh hit the lead around the turn as Defier challenged and Lonhro lost ground trying to balance up for the straight. In the straight, Fields of Omagh refused to give in to Defier with Lonhro closing down the outside. Fields of Omagh crossed the line to win by a long neck from Defier with Lonhro a half length away third. For the second year running, Lonhro had failed to run as well as expected in the Cox Plate. Critics claimed that the horse was a fair weather champion, dominant in small weight-for-age fields but unable to cope with the pressure of a larger field.

In 2004, Lonhro opened his campaign in the C.F. Orr S-Gr1 (1,400 m) at Caulfield. Inside the final 100 m, he swept up on the outside to hit the front from Sound Action and Super Elegant as Vocabulary took a narrow run between them. Vocabulary lunged at Lonhro but he won by a half head with Sound Action third. Lonhro took on a similar field in the St George S-Gr2 (1,800 m) two weeks later, winning eased up by 1½ lengths. He then lined up in his final race in Melbourne in the Australian Cup-Gr1 (2,000 m) at Flemington.

The field featured some of the stars of the spring with Lonhro joined by Makybe Diva (Melbourne Cup), Mummify (Caulfield Cup), and Elvstroem (VRC Derby). Lonhro was pocketed 200 metres from home but got out and scored a narrow victory in the final stride, beating Delzao.

Lonhro returned home to Sydney for his last two races before retirement. Both Octagonal and Lonhro were known for arriving at the barriers, stopping with head up and looking for the winning post (closely monitored by the on-track camera), then calmly walking into the barriers. On 3 April 2004, Lonhro competed in his second George Ryder S-Gr1 (1,500 m). His sire Octagonal (brought down from Woodlands Stud for the event) came into the mounting yard first, followed by Lonhro. Octagonal then led out the field, who then galloped down the straight as the field went to the barriers.

The field jumped, and Lonhro settled at the rear as usual. It was an evenly run race round the Rosehill track. In the final 100 m, Lonhro started to race away, winning by 2½ lengths from Grand Armee with a further 1½ lengths to Private Steer, who won the Doncaster – All Aged Stakes – Gr1 double at her next two starts.

On the final day of the AJC carnival, Lonhro lined up for his final race start in his second Queen Elizabeth Stakes-Gr1 (2,000 m). Again, he settled near the rear, but Grand Armee's rider rode a tactically clever race, taking the lead and slowing the pace in the middle part, whilst opening up a large gap between himself and Lonhro. In the straight, the gap was to prove too great for Lonhro, and Grand Armee ran out the winner by six lengths.

== Race record ==
2000-01 season as a Two-Year-Old
Result	Date	Race	Venue	Group	Distance	Weight (kg)	Time	Jockey	Winner/2nd
2nd	18 Nov 2000	2yo Restricted Hcp	Rosehill	N/A	1100 m	54.5	1:05.44	R. Quinn	1st - Royal Courtship
Won	27 Jan 2001	2yo C&G Hcp	Rosehill	N/A	1100 m	54.5	1:05.58	R. Quinn	2nd - London Eye
Won	11 Feb 2001	Blue Diamond Prelude	Caulfield	G3	1100 m	55.5	1:03.39	B. Prebble	2nd - Niewand
4th	24 Feb 2001	Blue Diamond Stakes	Caulfield	G1	1200 m	55.5	1:09.96	B. Prebble	1st - True Jewels
3rd	28 Jul 2001	Missile Stakes	Rosehill	G3	1100 m	51	1:06.69	L. Cassidy	1st - Sportsbrat

2001-02 season as a Three-Year-Old
Result	Date	Race	Venue	Group	Distance	Weight (kg)	Time	Jockey	Winner/2nd
Won	18 Aug 2001	Warwick Stakes	Warwick Farm	G2	1300 m	49.5	1:17.30	D. McLellan	2nd - Diamond Dane
Won	1 Sep 2001	Ming Dynasty Quality	Randwick	G3	1400 m	57.5	1:23.87	R. Quinn	2nd - Prince of Play
Won	15 Sep 2001	Heritage Stakes	Rosehill	LR	1200 m	55.5	1:10.28	R. Quinn	2nd - Perfect Crime
Won	29 Sep 2001	Stan Fox Stakes	Randwick	G2	1400 m	55	1:24.00	R. Quinn	2nd - Magic Albert
Won	13 Oct 2001	Caulfield Guineas	Caulfield	G1	1600 m	55.5	1:36.70	D. Gauci	2nd - Ustinov
Won	2 Feb 2002	Royal Sovereign Stakes	Warwick Farm	G2	1200 m	57.5	1:11.06	R. Quinn	2nd - Viking Ruler
Won	16 Feb 2002	Hobartville Stakes	Randwick	G2	1400 m	55.5	1:23.58	R. Quinn	2nd - Athens

2002-03 season as a Four-Year-Old
Result	Date	Race	Venue	Group	Distance	Weight (kg)	Time	Jockey	Winner/2nd
Won	3 Aug 2002	Missile Stakes	Rosehill	G3	1100 m	57.5	1:03.53	D. Beadman	2nd - Ancient Song
2nd	24 Aug 2002	Warwick Stakes	Warwick Farm	G2	1400 m	57.5	1:21.85	D. Beadman	1st - Defier
Won	7 Sep 2002	Chelmsford Stakes	Randwick	G2	1600 m	57.5	1:36.30	D. Beadman	2nd - Platinum Scissors
4th	29 Sep 2002	George Main Stakes	Randwick	G1	1600 m	57.5	1:38.31	D. Beadman	1st - Defier
Won	12 Oct 2002	Caulfield Stakes	Caulfield	G1	2000 m	57.5	2:00.60	D. Beadman	2nd - Sunline
6th	26 Oct 2002	W. S. Cox Plate	Moonee Valley	G1	2040 m	56.5	2:06.27	D. Beadman	1st - Northerly
Won	2 Nov 2002	LKS Mackinnon Stakes	Flemington	G1	2000 m	57.5	2:02.64	D. Beadman	2nd - Royal Code
Won	22 Feb 2003	Expressway Stakes	Randwick	G2	1200 m	57.5	1:10.66	D. Beadman	2nd - Belle Du Jour
Won	8 Mar 2003	Apollo Stakes	Randwick	G2	1400 m	58	1:22.49	D. Beadman	2nd - Hoeburg
Won	15 Mar 2003	Chipping Norton Stakes	Warwick Farm	G1	1600 m	58	1:37.93	D. Beadman	2nd - Shogun Lodge
Won	5 Apr 2003	George Ryder Stakes	Rosehill	G1	1500 m	58	1:30.71	D. Beadman	2nd - Dash for Cash
4th	19 Apr 2003	Doncaster Handicap	Randwick	G1	1600 m	57.5	1:36.85	D. Beadman	1st - Grand Armee
Won	3 May 2003	Queen Elizabeth Stakes	Randwick	G1	2000 m	58	2:04.80	D. Beadman	2nd - Pentastic

2003-04 season as a Five-Year-Old
Result	Date	Race	Venue	Group	Distance	Weight (kg)	Time	Jockey	Winner/2nd
Won	23 Aug 2003	Warwick Stakes	Warwick Farm	G2	1400 m	58	1:24.35	D. Beadman	2nd - Clangalang
Won	6 Sep 2003	Chelmsford Stakes	Randwick	G2	1600 m	58	1:35.06	D. Beadman	2nd - Platinum Scissors
Won	27 Sep 2003	George Main Stakes	Randwick	G1	1600 m	58	1:37.48	D. Beadman	2nd - Grand Armee
Won	11 Oct 2003	Caulfield Stakes	Caulfield	G1	2000 m	58	2:03.30	D. Beadman	2nd - Mummify
3rd	25 Oct 2003	W. S. Cox Plate	Moonee Valley	G1	2040 m	58	2:07.61	D. Beadman	1st - Fields Of Omagh
Won	7 Feb 2004	C F Orr Stakes	Caulfield	G1	1400 m	58	1:21.97	D. Beadman	2nd - Vocabulary
Won	21 Feb 2004	St George Stakes	Caulfield	G2	1800 m	58	1:50.98	D. Gauci	2nd - Sound Action
Won	8 Mar 2004	Australian Cup	Flemington	G1	2000 m	58	2:01.67	D. Beadman	2nd - Delzao
Won	5 Apr 2004	George Ryder Stakes	Rosehill	G1	1500 m	58	1:27.24	D. Beadman	2nd - Grand Armee
2nd	19 Apr 2004	Queen Elizabeth Stakes	Randwick	G1	2000 m	58	2:03.26	D. Beadman	1st - Grand Armee

== Statistics ==
In winning 26 of his 35 starts, Lonhro won 13 of his first 18 starts, and 13 of last 17 starts. His longest losing streak was two races, at his fourth and fifth starts, and thereafter he was never defeated in consecutive races. His longest winning streak was eight races, and he had other winning streaks of five races (twice) and four races. He won at least two races in seven of his eight preparations, and four races or more in five of his preparations. His winning strike-rate (74%) is the highest of any Australian champion with a comparable number of starts since the introduction of the award, and is higher than that of four of the five inaugural Hall Of Fame inductees – Phar Lap, Bernborough, Tulloch, and Kingston Town – and second only to Carbine, who raced more than 100 years earlier. Lonhro's winning strike-rate in Group One races (64%) is the highest of any comparable Australian champion since the introduction of the system, including Kingston Town.

== Stud record ==
Lonhro stood at Woodlands Stud in 2004–07 at his birthplace, and next to his own sire, Octagonal. His initial fee was announced as A$66,000 – a record for local first-season stallion, but comparable with first-season shuttle horses from the Northern Hemisphere. While there was some discussion over the price Lonhro is arguably the best performed stallion to retire to stud in Australia since Tulloch in the early 1960s. A Lonhro colt from a Royal Academy mare, Palme d'Or, brought NZ$1,050,000 at the 2007 Karaka premier Sale in New Zealand, while Denman, from his second crop, won the Golden Rose at Rosehill in August 2009. Woodlands stud was later bought out by Sheikh Mohammad bin Rashid Al Maktoum's Darley Stud. At stud in 2008–22 at Darley's Kelvinside Stud Australia where he was alongside his son Denman. Shuttled in 2012–14 to Darley's stallion farm at Jonabell in Lexington, Kentucky. Pensioned from stud duties in 2023.

With the completion of the 2010-2011 Australian racing season Lonhro was crowned the Leading sire in Australia. He ended the season some $1.2 million clear of his nearest rival Redoute's Choice. It was the first time in 40 years that an Australian Champion Racehourse of the Year (2004) was also named Australian Champion Sire (2011).

=== Notable progeny ===
Lonhro has 14 individual Group One winners. Lonhro's Group One winners are:

c = colt, f = filly, g = gelding

Foaled	Name	Sex	Major wins
2005	Beaded	f	Doomben 10,000
2006	Denman	c	Golden Rose Stakes
2008	Mental	g	Patinack Farm Classic
2009	Pierro	c	Golden Slipper Stakes, Sires Produce Stakes, Champagne Stakes, Canterbury Stakes, George Ryder Stakes
2010	Benfica	c	T.J. Smith Stakes
2010	Bounding	f	Railway Stakes
2011	The Conglomerate	g	Durban July Handicap
2012	Exosphere	c	Golden Rose Stakes
2013	Impending	c	Stradbroke Handicap, Kingsford-Smith Cup
2014	Kementari	c	Randwick Guineas
2015	Aristia	f	VRC Oaks
2016	Lyre	f	Blue Diamond Stakes
2019	Lindermann	c	Rosehill Guineas
2022	Attica	c	Spring Champion Stakes

Lonhro also has 20 individual Group Two winners including: Academus, Banish, Cardsharp, Encryption, Ghisoni, Heatherly, Isotherm, Loch Eagle, Lonhspresso, Messine, Obsequious, Old North, O'lonhro, Parables, Pareanui Bay, Pinwheel, Renaissance, Sessions, Souchez and Wawail.

In August 2011 Makybe Diva, a fellow Australian Champion Racehorse of the Year (2005 & 2006) produced her fourth foal, a colt by Lonhro called Taqneen.

== Pedigree ==
Pedigree of Lonhro (AUS),
Sire Octagonal (NZ) Br. 1992	Zabeel (NZ); B. 1986	Sir Tristram (Ire); B. 1971	Sir Ivor (USA) B. 1965
Sire Octagonal (NZ) Br. 1992	Zabeel (NZ); B. 1986	Sir Tristram (Ire); B. 1971	Isolt (USA) B. 1961
Sire Octagonal (NZ) Br. 1992	Zabeel (NZ); B. 1986	Lady Giselle (Fr); B. 1982	Nureyev (USA) B. 1977
Sire Octagonal (NZ) Br. 1992	Zabeel (NZ); B. 1986	Lady Giselle (Fr); B. 1982	Valderna (Fr) B. 1972
Sire Octagonal (NZ) Br. 1992	Eight Carat (GB); Bl. 1975	Pieces of Eight (Ire); Dk B./Br. 1963	Relic (USA) Blk. 1945
Sire Octagonal (NZ) Br. 1992	Eight Carat (GB); Bl. 1975	Pieces of Eight (Ire); Dk B./Br. 1963	Baby Doll (GB) Dk B./Br. 1956
Sire Octagonal (NZ) Br. 1992	Eight Carat (GB); Bl. 1975	Klairessa (GB); Dk B./Br. 1969	Klairon (Fr) B. 1952
Sire Octagonal (NZ) Br. 1992	Eight Carat (GB); Bl. 1975	Klairessa (GB); Dk B./Br. 1969	Courtessa (GB) B. 1955
Dam Shadea (NZ) Br. 1988	Straight Strike (USA); Dk B./Br. 1977	Mr. Prospector (USA); B. 1970	Raise a Native (USA) Ch. 1961
Dam Shadea (NZ) Br. 1988	Straight Strike (USA); Dk B./Br. 1977	Mr. Prospector (USA); B. 1970	Gold Digger (USA) B. 1962
Dam Shadea (NZ) Br. 1988	Straight Strike (USA); Dk B./Br. 1977	Bend Not (USA); B. 1972	Never Bend (USA) Dk B./Br. 1960
Dam Shadea (NZ) Br. 1988	Straight Strike (USA); Dk B./Br. 1977	Bend Not (USA); B. 1972	Jennie Sue (USA) Ch. 1961
Dam Shadea (NZ) Br. 1988	Concia (NZ); B. 1978	First Consul (USA); Dk B./Br. 1970	Forli (Arg) Ch. 1963
Dam Shadea (NZ) Br. 1988	Concia (NZ); B. 1978	First Consul (USA); Dk B./Br. 1970	Bold Consort (USA) B. 1960
Dam Shadea (NZ) Br. 1988	Concia (NZ); B. 1978	My Tricia (NZ); Br. 1974	Hermes (GB) B. 1963
Dam Shadea (NZ) Br. 1988	Concia (NZ); B. 1978	My Tricia (NZ); Br. 1974	Gay Poss (NZ) B. 1966

== See also ==
- Australian Champion Racehorse of the Year
