= Blue Diamond Preview (C&G) =

Blue Diamond Preview (Colts and Geldings)
- Class: Listed
- Location: Caulfield Racecourse
- Inaugurated: 1982 (Listed race)
- Race type: Thoroughbred
- Sponsor: Sportsbet (2023)

Race information
- Distance: 1,000 metres
- Surface: Turf
- Track: Left-handed
- Qualification: Two year old colts and geldings
- Weight: Set weights with penalties
- Purse: $250,000 (2025)

The Blue Diamond Preview (Colts and Geldings) is a Melbourne Racing Club Listed Thoroughbred horse race, raced under set weights with penalties conditions for two years old colts and geldings, over a distance of 1000 metres run at Caulfield Racecourse in Melbourne, Australia in late January. Prize money for the race is A$200,000. The race lost its Group classification in 2006.

== History ==
The race is considered a lead-up to the Group 2 Blue Diamond Prelude C&G the following month and both races are used as lead-up races to the Group 1 Blue Diamond Stakes in late February at Caulfield. The race is usually held on the Australia Day public holiday.
Along with this event the Blue Diamond Preview Fillies is held.
Thoroughbreds that have captured the Blue Diamond Preview – Blue Diamond Stakes double:
Midnight Fever (1987), Zeditave (1988), Knowledge (1997), Bel Esprit (2002), Reaan (2008) and Sepoy (2011)

=== Name ===
Prior 1996 the race was known as Blue Diamond Prelude (C&G) and was run at Sandown Racecourse and was not to be confused with the Blue Diamond Prelude C&G run at Caulfield Racecourse a couple of weeks later at a distance of 1,100 metres.

=== Grade ===
- 1982–1987 - Listed race
- 1988–2005 - Group 3
- 2006 onwards - Listed race

=== Distance ===
- 1982–1983 – 1200 metres
- 1984 onwards - 1000 metres

=== Venue ===
- 1988–1996 - Sandown Racecourse
- 1997–2005 - Caulfield Racecourse
- 2006 - Sandown Racecourse
- 2007–2014 - Caulfield Racecourse
- 2015 - Sandown Racecourse
- 2016 onwards - Caulfield Racecourse

== Winners ==
- 2025 - Shining Smile
- 2024 - High Octane
- 2023 - The Instructor
- 2022 - Daumier
- 2021 - General Beau
- 2020 - Hanseatic
- 2019 - I Am Immortal
- 2018 - Long Leaf
- 2017 - Property
- 2016 - Cohesion
- 2015 - Burnstone
- 2014 - Mohave
- 2013 - Dissident
- 2012 - The Travelling Man
- 2011 - Sepoy
- 2010 - Innocent Gamble
- 2009 - Reward For Effort
- 2008 - Reaan
- 2007 - Cecconi
- 2006 - Kapphero
- 2005 - Danger Looms
- 2004 - Sanziro
- 2003 - Murphy's Blu Boy
- 2002 - Bel Esprit
- 2001 - Sheraton
- 2000 - Toorak Thunder
- 1999 - Cullen
- 1998 - Special Edition
- 1997 - Knowledge
- 1996 - Jumpin' Jive
- 1995 - Tuscany Flyer
- 1994 - Renarchi
- 1993 - St. Rory
- 1992 - Vertingly
- 1991 - Noble Lancer
- 1990 - Canny Lad
- 1988 - Zeditave
- 1987 - †Midnight Fever / Change Of Habit

† The event held in divisions

== See also ==
- List of Australian Group races
- Group races
