= Black Opal Stakes =

Horse race

- Class: Group 3
- Location: Canberra Racecourse, Canberra, Australia
- Inaugurated: 1973
- Race type: Thoroughbred - flat
- Sponsor: John McGrath Auto Group (2018-2026)

Race information
- Distance: 1,200 metres
- Surface: Turf
- Track: Right-handed
- Qualification: Two year old
- Weight: Set weights with penalties
- Purse: A$200,000 (2026)

The Black Opal Stakes is a Canberra Racing Club Group 3 Thoroughbred horse race, for two-year-olds, at set weights, over a distance of 1200 metres, held annually at Canberra Racecourse in Canberra, Australia in March.

== History ==
=== In the Beginning ===
Brian Connell, while on a prospecting holiday found a chip of opal and thought, 'black opal', what a great name for a race. He raised the idea for the establishment of Canberra's premier race to the committee of the Canberra Racing Club, on June 5, 1972, and Connell moved that the club conduct a classic event for two-year-olds in the 1973-74 season. The groundwork for the start of the race was made with a sub-committee comprising Connell, vice-president Geoff Small and Jim O'Sullivan.

=== Grade ===
- 1975–1978 - Principal Race
- 1979–1986 - Group 3
- 1987–1998 - Group 2
- 1999–2005 - Group 3
- 2006–2014 - Listed Race
- 2015 onwards - Group 3

=== Records ===
Catbird (1999) is the only two-year-old to have taken out the Black Opal Stakes & Golden Slipper Stakes double since its inception.

The fastest winning time is by King Of Pop in 2025 with 1:09.13 breaking the longstanding race record held by St Covet since 1994 (1:09.6).

=== Recent multiple winners ===
Trainers

- Paul Snowden in 2016 and with Peter Snowden in 2020, 2021 and 2024.
- Peter Snowden in 2012 and with Paul Snowden in 2020, 2021 and 2024.
- Gary Portelli in 2001, 2006 and 2009
- Gerald Ryan in 2014 and 2017 and with Sterling Alexiou in 2025.

Jockeys

- Glyn Schofield in 2013, 2014 and 2018

== Winners ==
The following are past winners of the race.

- 2026 - Music Time
- 2025 - King Of Pop
- 2024 - Holmes A Court
- 2023 - Autumn Ballet
- 2022 - Queen Of The Ball
- 2021 - Kalashnikov
- 2020 - Barbaric
- 2019 - Pin Sec
- 2018 - Encryption
- 2017 - Trapeze Artist
- 2016 - Defcon
- 2015 - Takedown
- 2014 - Lucky Raquie
- 2013 - Criterion
- 2012 - Epaulette
- 2011 - You're Canny
- 2010 - Decision Time
- 2009 - Delago Bolt
- 2008 - Sarthemare
- 2007 - †race not held
- 2006 - Down The Wicket
- 2005 - Al Samer
- 2004 - Uber
- 2003 - Handsome Ransom
- 2002 - Planchet
- 2001 - Coral Salute
- 2000 - Pembleton
- 1999 - Catbird
- 1998 - Speed Week
- 1997 - Fraud
- 1996 - Paint
- 1995 - Zadok
- 1994 - St. Covet
- 1993 - Danger
- 1992 - Clan O'Sullivan
- 1991 - Sormani
- 1990 - Unspoken Word
- 1989 - Marks Gain
- 1988 - Comely Girl
- 1987 - Maizcay
- 1986 - Just Blooming
- 1985 - New Atlantis
- 1984 - Spirit Of Kingston
- 1983 - Brummel Who
- 1982 - Beans
- 1981 - Chinese Treasure
- 1980 - Nasau
- 1979 - Star Grace
- 1978 - Gold Mosaic
- 1977 - Blazing Saddles
- 1976 - Bianca
- 1975 - Silver Shadow
- 1974 - Royal Brittania
- 1973 - Rich Reward

† Canberra's racetrack, Thoroughbred Park was under redevelopment.

== See also ==
- List of Australian Group races
- Group races
