= Bill Duncan (jockey) =

Australian Jockey

William Duncan
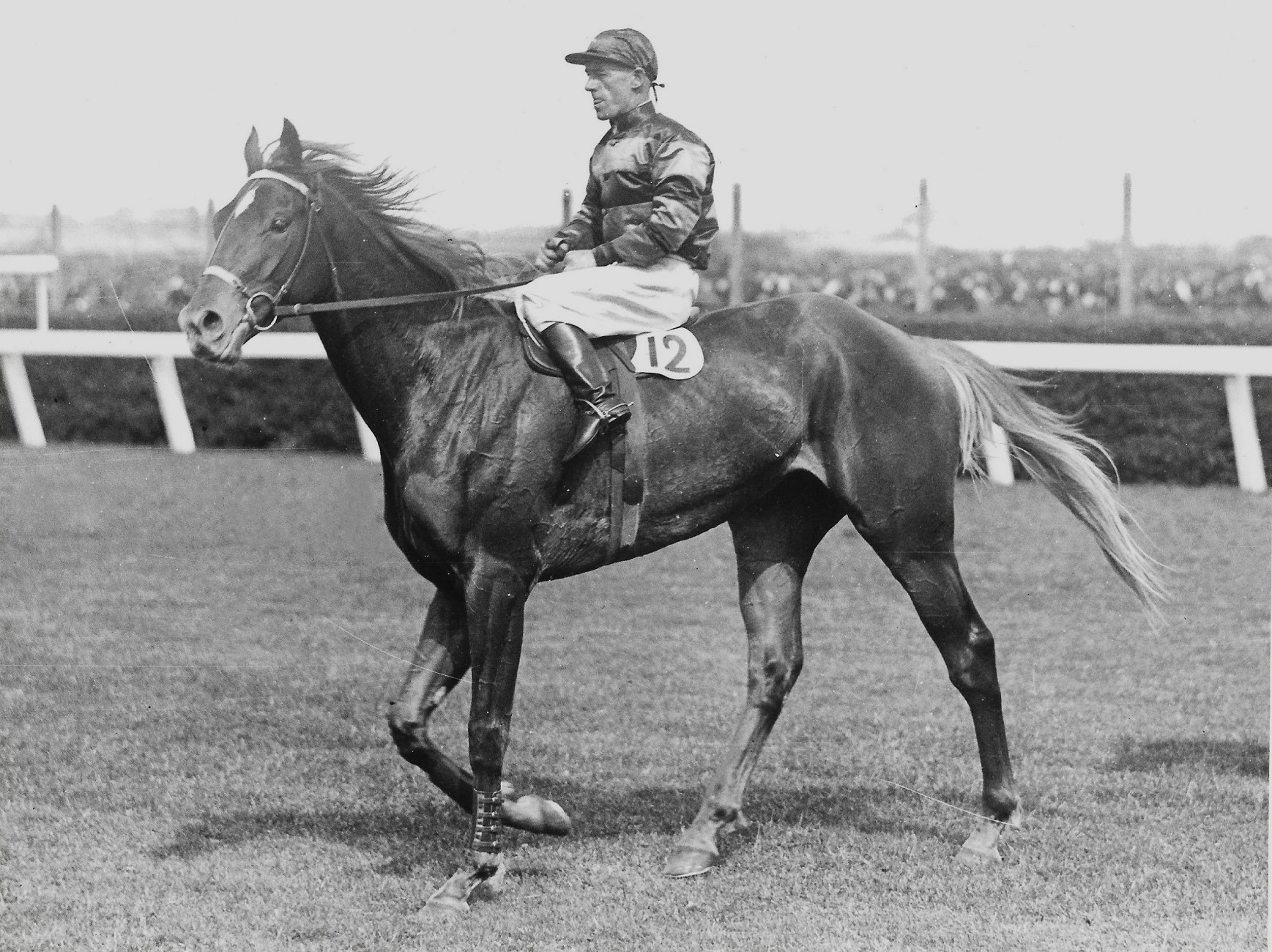
- Peter Pan and W. Duncan; Flemington Racecourse

Personal information
- Nationality: Australian
- Born: 1900 Australia
- Died: 1983 (aged 82–83)
- Occupation: Jockey

Horse racing career
- Sport: Horse racing
- Career wins: 893

Major racing wins
- Melbourne Cup (1918, 1932); Caulfield Cup (1928, 1929); AJC Derby (1925); W. S. Cox Plate (1928); Crown Oaks (1926); Australian Oaks (1926); Doncaster Handicap (1928); Epsom Handicap (1925); Metropolitan Handicap(1928); Australian Cup (1924, 1931)

Honours
- Sport Australia Hall of Fame; Australian Racing Hall of Fame

Significant horses
- Night Watch, Manfred, Peter Pan
- Updated on 14 May 2026

William Duncan (1900–1983) was an Australian jockey known for his highly successful career during the inter-war period. During his 17-year career span from 1915 to 1933 he won 893 races, 74 of which were stakes races including the Melbourne Cup in 1918 and 1932.

== Career ==
William Duncan as an apprentice rode to his first win in 1916 at Mentone. Duncan's first major win was the Coongy Handicap in October 1918 on Torbane. Less than a month later Duncan would be chosen to ride Night Watch in the 1918 Melbourne Cup as he was one of the few jockeys who could make the weight limit of 6st 9 lbs (42 kg). He rode Night Watch to a win by half a length ahead of Kennaquhair and set a new race record time of 3 minutes 25.75 seconds.

In 1924, Duncan won the Australian Cup on future Melbourne up winner Accarak. In 1925 he won the Epsom Handicap and the AJC Derby. In the 1925 AJC Derby Duncan's horse Manfred refused to start until all six of his rivals had travelled half a furlong (100m) before Duncan managed to get him going where he eventually overtook the field and won the race by 1 and a half lengths. In 1926 he won the VRC Oaks.

In 1928 and 1929 Duncan would win a series of high-profile stakes including the two successive Caulfield Cups (1928, 1929), the 1928 Doncaster Handicap, the 1928 W S Cox Plate and the 1928 Metropolitan Handicap, before suffering a broken back from a race fall in late 1929. Duncan would later win the 1931 Australian Cup and the 1932 Melbourne Cup. Duncan won the 1932 Melbourne Cup on Peter Pan by a neck.

Duncan retired in 1933 after injury resulting from a fall from Rose Valais.

== Legacy ==
On 5 December 1989, Duncan was inducted into the Sport Australia Hall of Fame for his achievements in the sport of Horse Racing. In 2003, he was inducted into the Australian Racing Hall of Fame for his achievements in the sport of Horse Racing.
