= Manfred Stakes =

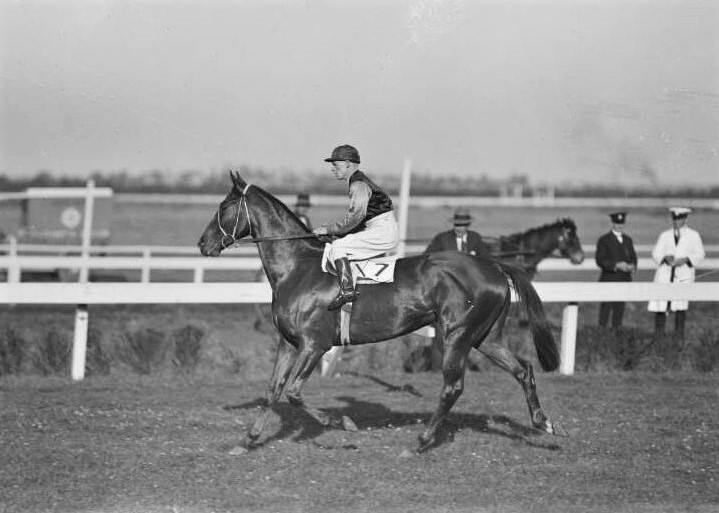
- Manfred
- Class: Group 3
- Location: Caulfield Racecourse
- Inaugurated: 1968
- Race type: Thoroughbred
- Sponsor: Quayclean (2026)

Race information
- Distance: 1,200 metres
- Surface: Turf
- Track: Left-handed
- Qualification: Three year old
- Weight: Set weights with penalties
- Purse: $200,000 (2026)

The Manfred Stakes is a Melbourne Racing Club Group 3 Thoroughbred horse race for three-year-olds at set weights with penalties run over a distance of 1200 metres at Caulfield Racecourse, Melbourne, Australia in late January or early February.

== History ==
The race is named in honour of the champion racehorse Manfred, who won the 1925 AJC Derby, Victoria Derby and W. S. Cox Plate. In 1926 he was also successful in the Caulfield Cup.

The race was usually held at Caulfield Racecourse but was moved to Sandown Racecourse for 2015 and scheduled to be raced on Australia Day. The race was upgraded in 2014 to Group 3, a class that the race held between 1983–1990.

=== Name ===
- 1968–1978 - Manfred Stakes
- 1979–1982 - Schweppes Cup
- 1983 - Schweppes Centenary Cup
- 1984–2004 - Schweppes Cup
- 2005 - Schweppervescence Cup
- 2006 - Manfred Stakes
- 2007–2010 - Wellington Racing Club Stakes
- 2011 onwards - Manfred Stakes

=== Grade ===
- 1968–1978 - Principal race
- 1979–1990 - Group 3
- 1991–2013 - Listed race
- 2014 onwards - Group 3

=== Distance ===
- 1968–1972 - 6 furlongs (~1200 metres)
- 1973 – 1400 metres
- 1974–1975 – 1600 metres
- 1976 – 1400 metres
- 1977–2004 – 1600 metres
- 2005–2010 – 1400 metres
- 2011 – 1300 metres
- 2012–2014 – 1200 metres
- 2015 – 1300 metres
- 2016 onwards - 1200 metres

=== Venue ===
- 1996, 2011, 2015 - Sandown Racecourse

== Winners ==
The following are past winners of the race.

- 2026 - Space Rider
- 2025 - Royal Insignia
- 2024 - Brave Mead
- 2023 - Jacquinot
- 2022 - Generation
- 2021 - Portland Sky
- 2020 - Super Seth
- 2019 - Tin Hat
- 2018 - Cliff's Edge
- 2017 - Legless Veuve
- 2016 - Puritan
- 2015 - Java
- 2014 - Bull Point
- 2013 - Mirage
- 2012 - Mosheen
- 2011 - Enjin Number Nine
- 2010 - Denman
- 2009 - Nicconi
- 2008 - Turffontein
- 2007 - Haradasun
- 2006 - Thin And Crispy
- 2005 - Niconero
- 2004 - Keep The Faith
- 2003 - Conspectus
- 2002 - Don Eduardo
- 2001 - Academy Dancer
- 2000 - Freemason
- 1999 - Market Price
- 1998 - Prince Standaan
- 1997 - Catainer
- 1996 - Eureka Jewel
- 1995 - Danasinga
- 1994 - Tristalove
- 1993 - Restitution
- 1992 - Dark Ksar
- 1991 - Beachside
- 1990 - Academian
- 1989 - Painted Ocean
- 1988 - Century Judge
- 1987 - Groucho
- 1986 - Khamacruz
- 1985 - Noble Peer
- 1984 - Pride Of Kellina
- 1983 - To The Wind
- 1982 - Getting Closer
- 1981 - Real Force
- 1980 - Polo Player
- 1979 - Fralo
- 1978 - Taskwin
- 1977 - Super Scope
- 1976 - †Zintoba / Silver Shaft
- 1975 - Kenmark
- 1974 - Bush Win
- 1973 - †Flying Gem / Gala Supreme
- 1972 - †Andros / Downland
- 1971 - Pilgarlic
- 1970 - Long Brandy
- 1969 - Gay Bachelor
- 1968 - Anvil

† Race run in divisions

== See also ==
- Blue Diamond Preview Fillies
- List of Australian Group races
- Group races
