= Inspiration (horse) =

Hong Kong-based racehorse

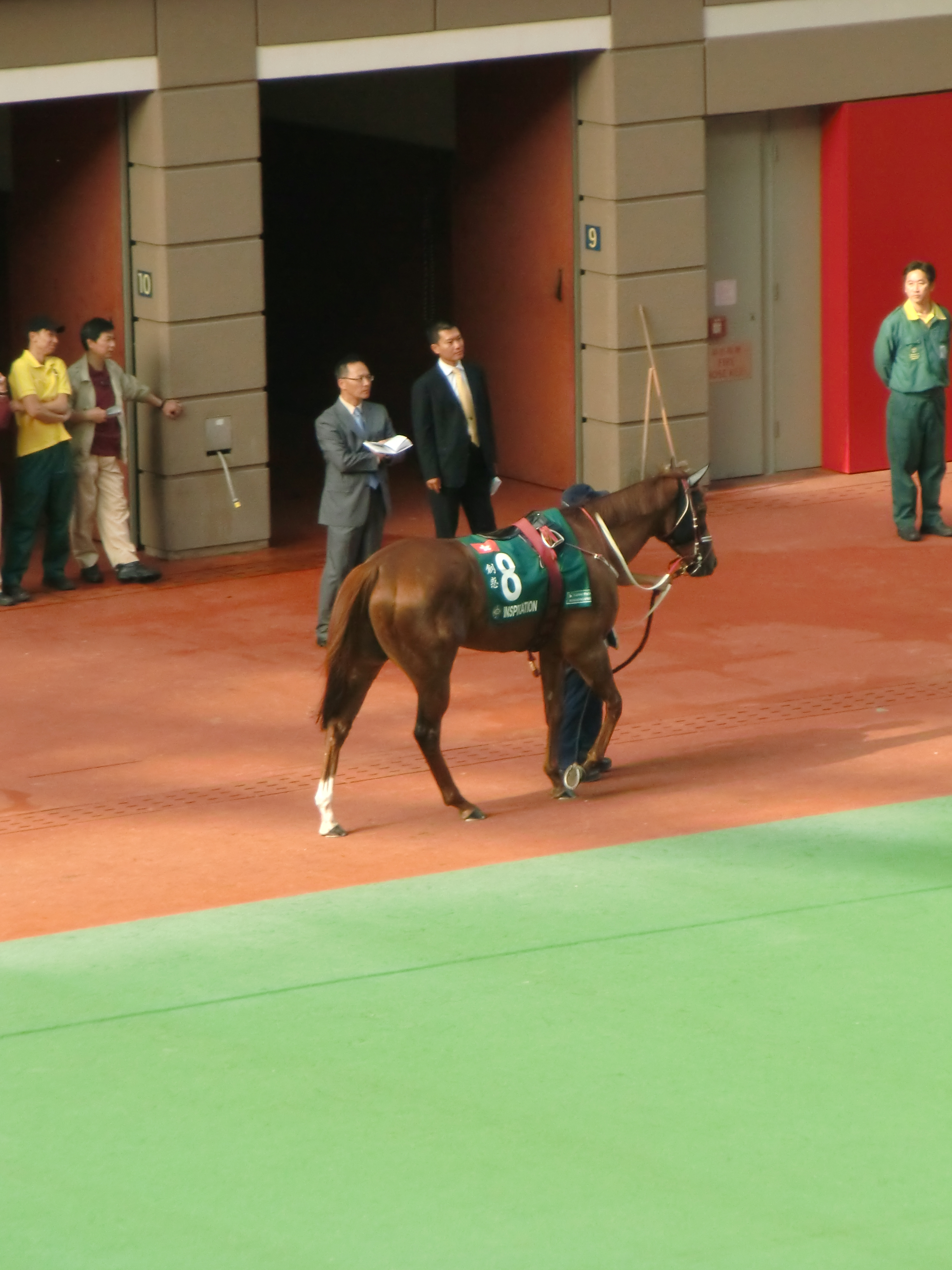
Inspiration

Inspiration (Chinese: 創惑; foaled 11 August 2003) is a Hong Kong–based Thoroughbred racehorse.

In the season of 2008–09, Inspiration catapulted himself from Class 2 winner in September at Happy Valley to shock 68–1 winner of the Cathay Pacific Hong Kong Sprint (G1-1200m) in December. In February 2009, he landed a second career Group One in the Centenary Sprint Cup (1000m). Inspiration also is one of the nominees of Hong Kong Horse of the Year.

== Profile ==
- Sire: Flying Spur
- Dam: La Bamba
- Sex: Gelding
- Country : Australia
- Colour : Chestnut
- Owner : Mr & Mrs Hui Sai Fun
- Trainer : John Moore
- Record : 31: 9-6-2 (As of 27 February 2012)
- Earnings : HK$15,528,450 (As of 27 February 2012)
