= Flying Spur (horse) =

Australian Thoroughbred racehorse

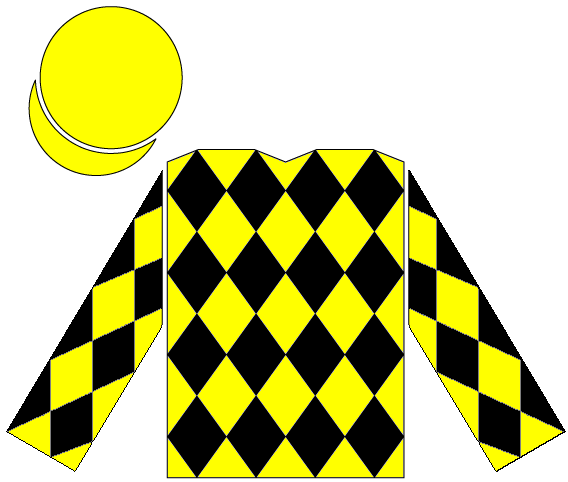
- Racing silks of Arrowfield Stud
- Sire: Danehill
- Grandsire: Danzig
- Dam: Rolls
- Damsire: Mr Prospector
- Sex: Stallion
- Foaled: 4 November 1992
- Died: 8 May 2018 (aged 25)
- Country: Australia
- Colour: Bay
- Breeder: Arrowfield Stud
- Owner: Arrowfield Stud
- Trainer: Lee Freedman
- Jockey: Damien Oliver; Mick Dittman; Glen Boss; Steven King
- Record: 20: 6–6–2
- Earnings: AU$2,085,843

Major wins
- Blue Diamond Prelude (1995); Golden Slipper (1995); Peter Pan Stakes (1995); Australian Guineas (1996); All Aged Stakes (1996)

Awards
- Leading sire in Australia (2006/07)

Flying Spur (4 November 1992–8 May 2018) was an Australian Thoroughbred racehorse that won three Group One races, most notably the 1995 Golden Slipper. He was also the Leading sire in Australia for the 2006/07 season.

== Background ==
Flying Spur was from the second crop of champion sire Danehill. He was born and bred at Arrowfield Stud in the Hunter Valley of New South Wales.

He was sent to the 1994 Inglis Easter Yearling Sale where he was bought for $160,000 by trainer Lee Freedman for a group of owners. The majority ownership of the horse was retained by Arrowfield Stud.

== Racing career ==
Flying Spur won at his debut on the 26 November 1994 at Caulfield. Two starts later he won his first stakes races the Blue Diamond Prelude when ridden by Mick Dittman. The following week he ran second in the Blue Diamond Stakes as a 13/4 favourite and backed up again a week later when third in the Sires' Produce Stakes (VRC).

After a three week break Flying Spur next contested the 1995 Golden Slipper where he started as a 25/1 outsider. Jim Cassidy was originally booked to ride the horse in the race but became disqualified from riding and Glen Boss was made his replacement. In a close finish Flying Spur defeated future Hall of Fame horse Octagonal in second place, with Millrich (future dam of Redzel) in third. Years later, Boss would say, "Flying Spur was the horse that really put me on the map. I owe a lot in my career to him."

Flying Spur would win his next Group One race in the 1996 Australian Guineas at Flemington when ridden by Damien Oliver and his third and final major being the 1996 All Aged Stakes at Randwick when ridden by Steven King.

== Stud career ==
Flying Spur was retired from racing after 20 starts to commence stallion duties at Arrowfield Stud. He performed this role between 1996 until 2012 when he was retired from service due to declining fertility. As well as being crowned Leading sire in Australia for the 2006/07 season, his progeny amassed over $135 million in prizemoney. He sired over 1,000 individual winners, including 99 stakes winners and 14 Group One winners.

After being retired from stallion duties, Flying Spur remained at Arrowfield Stud and lived out his days there until dying in 2018 aged 25. He was laid to rest and buried at the stud.

=== Notable progeny ===
Flying Spur's 14 Group One winners:

c = colt, f = filly, g = gelding

| Foaled | Name | Sex | Major wins |
| 1997 | All Time High | f | The Thousand Guineas |
| 1998 | Juanmo | f | Sires' Produce Stakes (BRC), TJ Smith Stakes (BRC) |
| 1998 | San Luis | c | Manawatu Sires Produce Stakes |
| 2000 | Roedean | f | Blue Diamond Stakes |
| 2002 | Magnus | c | The Galaxy |
| 2003 | Alverta | f | Coolmore Classic |
| 2003 | Casino Prince | c | Chipping Norton Stakes |
| 2003 | Inspiration | g | Hong Kong Sprint, Centenary Sprint Cup |
| 2003 | Mentality | g | Champagne Stakes, Randwick Guineas, George Main Stakes |
| 2004 | Dealer Principle | g | Rosehill Guineas |
| 2004 | Forensics | f | Golden Slipper, Queen of the Turf Stakes, Myer Classic |
| 2004 | Sleek Chassis | f | Blue Diamond Stakes |
| 2009 | Sacred Star | g | Telegraph Handicap, NRM Sprint |
| 2011 | Boom Time | c | Caulfield Cup |

== Pedigree ==
Pedigree of Flying Spur (AUS) 1992
| Sire Danehill (USA) 1986 | Danzig (USA); 1977 | Northern Dancer | Nearctic |
| Sire Danehill (USA) 1986 | Danzig (USA); 1977 | Northern Dancer | Natalma |
| Sire Danehill (USA) 1986 | Danzig (USA); 1977 | Pas de Nom | Admiral's Voyage |
| Sire Danehill (USA) 1986 | Danzig (USA); 1977 | Pas de Nom | Petitioner |
| Sire Danehill (USA) 1986 | Razyana (USA); 1981 | His Majesty | Ribot |
| Sire Danehill (USA) 1986 | Razyana (USA); 1981 | His Majesty | Flower Bowl |
| Sire Danehill (USA) 1986 | Razyana (USA); 1981 | Spring Adieu | Buckpasser |
| Sire Danehill (USA) 1986 | Razyana (USA); 1981 | Spring Adieu | Natalma |
| Dam Rolls (USA) 1984 | Mr Prospector (USA); 1970 | Raise a Native | Native Dancer |
| Dam Rolls (USA) 1984 | Mr Prospector (USA); 1970 | Raise a Native | Raise You |
| Dam Rolls (USA) 1984 | Mr Prospector (USA); 1970 | Gold Digger | Nashua |
| Dam Rolls (USA) 1984 | Mr Prospector (USA); 1970 | Gold Digger | Sequence |
| Dam Rolls (USA) 1984 | Grand Luxe (CAN); 1974 | Sir Ivor | Sir Gaylord |
| Dam Rolls (USA) 1984 | Grand Luxe (CAN); 1974 | Sir Ivor | Atilla |
| Dam Rolls (USA) 1984 | Grand Luxe (CAN); 1974 | Fanfreluche | Northern Dancer |
| Dam Rolls (USA) 1984 | Grand Luxe (CAN); 1974 | Fanfreluche | Ciboulettel |
