= Manuel (Australian horse) =

Australian thoroughbred racehorse

- Sire: Commands
- Grandsire: Danehill
- Dam: Girl Hussler
- Damsire: Hussonet
- Sex: Gelding
- Foaled: 27 September 2013
- Died: 24 January 2020 (aged 6)
- Country: Australia
- Colour: Bay
- Breeder: Segenhoe Thoroughbreds Australia Pty Ltd
- Owner: G R Lechte, J Lechte, Pipeliner Bloodstock
- Trainer: Tony & Calvin McEvoy
- Record: 29: 8–6–2
- Earnings: A$811,950

Major wins
- C F Orr Stakes (2019)

Manuel (foaled 27 September 2013 - 24 January 2020) was a Group 1 winning Australian thoroughbred racehorse.

== Background ==
Manuel was sold at the 2015 Inglis Easter yearling sale for A$240,000.

== Racing career ==
Manuel won the 2019 C F Orr Stakes at Caulfield Racecourse when leading all the way at odds of 20/1. This was Manuel's first attempt at a Group 1 race.

== Death ==
On the 24 January 2020, Manuel was euthanised at Moonee Valley Racecourse after suffering severe injuries when falling in the Australia Stakes.
