= Rodney Quinn =

Australian former jockey (born 1960)

Rodney Michael Quinn (born 25 June 1960) is an Australian former jockey who rode over 2,000 winners before announcing his retirement on 23 November 2013 after almost 40 years in the saddle. His most notable achievements include six wins aboard champion horse Lonhro, his iconic win on Viscount in the Group 1 Champagne Stakes, beating Makybe Diva in the 2004 Group 1 BMW on Grand Zulu, his 80-1 shot win on Curata Storm in the 2002 Mercedes Classic and his long and successful association with the Inghams/Crown Lodge stable.
