= Sepoy (horse) =

Australian thoroughbred racehorse

- Racing colours of Sheikh Mohammed
- Sire: Elusive Quality
- Grandsire: Gone West
- Dam: Watchful
- Damsire: Danehill
- Sex: Colt
- Foaled: 27 September 2008
- Country: Australia
- Colour: Chestnut
- Breeder: Darley
- Owner: Sheikh Mohammed
- Trainer: Peter Snowden
- Jockey: Kerrin McEvoy
- Record: 13: 10-1-0
- Earnings: A$3,880,000

Major wins
- Blue Diamond Preview C&G (2011); Blue Diamond Prelude C&G (2011); Blue Diamond Stakes (2011); Golden Slipper (2011); Vain Stakes (2011); Danehill Stakes (2011); Manikato Stakes (2011); Caulfield Sprint (2011); Coolmore Stud Stakes (2011)

Awards
- Australian Champion Two Year Old (2010/11); Australian Champion Three Year Old Colt/Gelding (2011/12)

Sepoy (foaled 27 September 2008) is a multiple Group One winning Australian thoroughbred racehorse who is most notable for winning the 2011 Golden Slipper.

== Background ==
Sepoy is a home-bred horse of Darley Stud by world record-breaking stallion Elusive Quality out of the Danehill mare Watchful. Watchful is the full sister to Camarena, winner of the Group One Queensland Derby who in turn is the dam of Sires' Produce.

== Racing career ==
Sepoy became the first horse since Rancher (1982) and Bel Esprit (2002) to win all three legs of the Blue Diamond series as a two-year-old.

Sepoy went on to win 10 of his 13 starts, including 4 at Group One level.

Sepoy would become Australian Champion Two Year Old in 2011 and Australian Champion Three Year Old Colt/Gelding in 2012.

== Stud career ==
Sepoy acted as a shuttle stallion for Darley Stud between both the northern and southern hemispheres.

Sepoy was retired from stud duty after the 2021 breeding season and will spend his retirement at Woodlands Stud in the Hunter Valley of New South Wales.

=== Notable progeny ===
c = colt, f = filly, g = gelding

Foaled	Name	Sex	Major wins
2014	Alizee	f	Flight Stakes, Coolmore Stud Stakes, Futurity Stakes
2015	Salute The Soldier	g	Al Maktoum Challenge, Round 3 (twice)

== Pedigree ==
Pedigree of Sepoy (AUS) 2008
Sire Elusive Quality (USA) 1993	Gone West (USA); 1984	Mr. Prospector	Raise a Native
Sire Elusive Quality (USA) 1993	Gone West (USA); 1984	Mr. Prospector	Gold Digger
Sire Elusive Quality (USA) 1993	Gone West (USA); 1984	Secrettame	Secretariat
Sire Elusive Quality (USA) 1993	Gone West (USA); 1984	Secrettame	Tamerett
Sire Elusive Quality (USA) 1993	Touch Of Greatness (USA); 1983	Hero's Honor	Northern Dancer
Sire Elusive Quality (USA) 1993	Touch Of Greatness (USA); 1983	Hero's Honor	Glowing Tribute
Sire Elusive Quality (USA) 1993	Touch Of Greatness (USA); 1983	Ivory Wand	Sir Ivor
Sire Elusive Quality (USA) 1993	Touch Of Greatness (USA); 1983	Ivory Wand	Natashka
Dam Watchful (AUS) 2001	Danehill (USA); 1986	Danzig	Northern Dancer
Dam Watchful (AUS) 2001	Danehill (USA); 1986	Danzig	Pas de Nom
Dam Watchful (AUS) 2001	Danehill (USA); 1986	Razyana	His Majesty
Dam Watchful (AUS) 2001	Danehill (USA); 1986	Razyana	Spring Adieu
Dam Watchful (AUS) 2001	Canny Lass (AUS); 1991	Marscay	Biscay
Dam Watchful (AUS) 2001	Canny Lass (AUS); 1991	Marscay	Heart of Market
Dam Watchful (AUS) 2001	Canny Lass (AUS); 1991	Jesmond Lass	Lunchtime
Dam Watchful (AUS) 2001	Canny Lass (AUS); 1991	Jesmond Lass	Beautiful Dreamer
