= Trapeze Artist (horse) =

Australian thoroughbred racehorse

- Sire: Snitzel
- Grandsire: Redoute's Choice
- Dam: Treppes
- Damsire: Domesday
- Sex: Stallion
- Foaled: 17 September 2014
- Country: Australia
- Colour: Bay or Brown
- Breeder: Bert Vieira
- Owner: Vieira Racing (Mgr: B Vieira), B Vieira, SG Vieira, T Vieira, C Vieira-Choy & JA Choy
- Trainer: Gerald Ryan
- Record: 20: 7–1–3
- Earnings: A$ 5,568,750

Major wins
- Black Opal Stakes (2017); Golden Rose Stakes (2017); Expressway Stakes (2017); TJ Smith Stakes (2018); All Aged Stakes (2018); Canterbury Stakes (2019)

Trapeze Artist (foaled 17 September 2014) is a four-time Group 1 winning Australian bred thoroughbred racehorse.

== Racing career ==
As a 2 year old Trapeze Artist won two races including the Black Opal Stakes. He also finished 6th in the Golden Slipper.

As a 3 year old he won his first Group 1 race the Golden Rose Stakes by a record margin of 4 lengths after being backed in from odds of 90/1 into 40/1.

Further Group 1 success was achieved by winning the TJ Smith Stakes in a race record time, bettering the race time of Black Caviar.

Three weeks later he won a further Group 1 in the All Aged Stakes, and his last race win came in the Group 1 Canterbury Stakes when ridden by Blake Shinn.

At his final race start in the TJ Smith Stakes, the horse finished unplaced and suffered a shoulder injury throughout the race and was immediately retired.

== Stud career ==
In 2019, Trapeze Artist commenced stallion duties at Widden Stud. His service fee for a first year stallion was set at an Australian record amount of $90,000 per service.

=== Notable progeny ===
c = colt, f = filly, g = gelding

Foaled	Name	Sex	Major wins
2020	Griff	c	Caulfield Guineas
2022	Panova	f	Australasian Oaks
