= Epaulette (horse) =

Australian Thoroughbred racehorse

- Racing silks of Sheikh Mohammed bin Rashid Al Maktoum
- Sire: Commands
- Grandsire: Danehill
- Dam: Accessories
- Damsire: Singspiel
- Sex: Stallion
- Foaled: 9 November 2009
- Country: Australia
- Colour: Bay
- Breeder: Darley
- Owner: Sheikh Mohammed bin Rashid Al Maktoum
- Trainer: Peter Snowden
- Jockey: Kerrin McEvoy
- Record: 14: 5–2–2
- Earnings: AU$1,717,750

Major wins
- Black Opal Stakes (2012); Golden Rose Stakes (2012); Caulfield Guineas Prelude (2012); Doomben 10,000 (2013)

Epaulette (foaled 9 November 2009) is a multiple Group One winning thoroughbred racehorse and successful stallion.

== Background ==
Epaulette was homebred by Darley Stud and is a three-quarter brother to Group One winning stallion, Helmet.

== Racing career ==
Epaulette won the Black Opal Stakes as a two-year-old.

As a three-year-old he had success in the Caulfield Guineas Prelude and the Group 1 Golden Rose Stakes. He also ran second behind the unbeaten Black Caviar in her final ever start in the 2013 TJ Smith Stakes.

Epaulette won his second Group 1 when successful in the Doomben 10,000. Epaulette only had one start as a four-year-old and was retired to stud.

== Stud career ==
Between 2014 and 2020 Epaulette acted as a shuttle stallion for Darley between Europe and Australia.

In 2021 he was sold by Darley to the Turkish Jockey Club where he will continue stallion duties for the 2022 season.

=== Notable progeny ===
c = colt, f = filly, g = gelding

Foaled	Name	Sex	Major wins
2015	Soqrat	c	Premiers Champion Stakes, Cape Guineas, HF Oppenheimer Horse Chestnut Stakes
2017	Red Lark	f	Del Mar Oaks
2019	Daumier	c	Blue Diamond Stakes

== Pedigree ==
Pedigree of Epaulette (AUS) 2009
Sire Commands (AUS) 1996	Danehill (USA); 1986	Danzig	Northern Dancer
Sire Commands (AUS) 1996	Danehill (USA); 1986	Danzig	Pas de Nom
Sire Commands (AUS) 1996	Danehill (USA); 1986	Razyana	His Majesty
Sire Commands (AUS) 1996	Danehill (USA); 1986	Razyana	Spring Adieu
Sire Commands (AUS) 1996	Cotehele House (GB); 1980	My Swanee	Petition
Sire Commands (AUS) 1996	Cotehele House (GB); 1980	My Swanee	Grey Rhythm
Sire Commands (AUS) 1996	Cotehele House (GB); 1980	Eight Carat	Pieces of Eight II
Sire Commands (AUS) 1996	Cotehele House (GB); 1980	Eight Carat	Klairessa
Dam Accessories (GB) 2003	Singspiel (IRE); 1992	In the Wings	Sadler's Wells
Dam Accessories (GB) 2003	Singspiel (IRE); 1992	In the Wings	High Hawk
Dam Accessories (GB) 2003	Singspiel (IRE); 1992	Glorious Song	Halo
Dam Accessories (GB) 2003	Singspiel (IRE); 1992	Glorious Song	Ballade
Dam Accessories (GB) 2003	Anna Matrushka (GB); 1984	Mill Reef	Never Bend
Dam Accessories (GB) 2003	Anna Matrushka (GB); 1984	Mill Reef	Milan Mill
Dam Accessories (GB) 2003	Anna Matrushka (GB); 1984	Anna Paola	Prince Ippi
Dam Accessories (GB) 2003	Anna Matrushka (GB); 1984	Anna Paola	Antwerpen
