= Blue Diamond Prelude C&G =

Blue Diamond Prelude Colts and Geldings
- Class: Group 3
- Location: Caulfield Racecourse, Sandown Racecourse
- Inaugurated: 1982 (Listed race)
- Race type: Thoroughbred
- Sponsor: Sportsbet (2026)

Race information
- Distance: 1,100 metres
- Surface: Turf
- Track: Left-handed
- Qualification: Two year old colts and geldings
- Weight: Set weights - 55½ kg
- Purse: $350,000 (2026)

The Blue Diamond Prelude (Colts and Geldings) is a Melbourne Racing Club Group 3 Thoroughbred horse race raced under set weight conditions, for two-year-old colts and geldings, over a distance of 1100 metres at Caulfield Racecourse in Melbourne, Australia in February.

== History ==
The race is a major preparatory race for the rich Blue Diamond Stakes held two weeks later.

Colts that have captured the Blue Diamond Prelude – Blue Diamond Stakes double:
Rancher (1982), Bel Esprit (2002), Sepoy (2011), Written By (2018)

=== Distance ===
- 1982–1985 – 1200 metres
- 1986–1995 – 1100 metres
- 1996 – 1150 metres
- 1997 onwards - 1100 metres

=== Grade ===
- 1982–1985 - Listed Race
- 1986 onwards - Group 3

=== Venue ===
- 1982–1995 - Caulfield Racecourse
- 1996 - Sandown Racecourse
- 1997–2022 - Caulfield Racecourse
- 2023 - Sandown Racecourse

== Winners ==
The following are winners of the race.

- 2026 - Closer To Free
- 2025 - Titan Pegasus
- 2024 - Bodyguard
- 2022 - Lofty Strike
- 2021 - General Beau
- 2020 - Hanseatic
- 2019 - I Am Immortal
- 2018 - Written By
- 2017 - Property
- 2016 - Flying Artie
- 2015 - Of The Brave
- 2014 - Rubick
- 2013 - Kuroshio
- 2012 - General Rippa
- 2011 - Sepoy
- 2010 - Beneteau
- 2009 - Real Saga
- 2008 - Wilander
- 2007 - Shrewd Rhythm
- 2006 - Due Sasso
- 2005 - Perfectly Ready
- 2004 - Way West
- 2003 - Hammerbeam
- 2002 - Bel Esprit
- 2001 - Lonhro
- 2000 - Happy Giggle
- 1999 - Charm Scene Lad
- 1998 - Prowl
- 1997 - Millward
- 1996 - Winger Charger
- 1995 - Flying Spur
- 1994 - Danzero
- 1993 - Alacqua
- 1992 - Yachtie
- 1991 - Chief Headhunter
- 1990 - Unspoken Word
- 1989 - Ark Regal
- 1988 - Nanutarra
- 1987 - Square Deal
- 1986 - Western Ace
- 1985 - Let's Get Physical
- 1984 - Slick Draw
- 1983 - Brave Show
- 1982 - Rancher

== See also ==
- List of Australian Group races
- Group races
