= Golden Rose Stakes =

- Class: Group 1
- Location: Rosehill Racecourse
- Inaugurated: 1978
- Race type: Thoroughbred - flat
- Sponsor: Yulong (2026)

Race information
- Distance: 1,400 metres
- Surface: Turf
- Track: Right-handed
- Qualification: Three year old
- Weight: Set weights Colts & geldings: 56 1/2kg Fillies: 54 1/2kg
- Purse: A$1,000,000 (2026)

The Golden Rose Stakes is an Australian Turf Club Group 1 Thoroughbred horse race for three-year-olds, run at set weights, over a distance of 1,400 metres at Rosehill Gardens Racecourse, Sydney, Australia. Previously run in late August or early September, the race is now run on the fourth Saturday in September.

== History ==
The initial race was named after the dual Melbourne Cup winner Peter Pan (1932, 1934).

When the race was renamed in 2003 the race had its grade dropped from Grade 2 to an unlisted race even though the stakes of the race were increased to $1 million.

In 2026, Rachel King became the first female jockey to win the race.

=== Name ===
- 1978–2002 - Peter Pan Stakes
- 2003 onwards - Golden Rose Stakes

=== Grade ===
- 1978 - Principal Race
- 1979–2002 - Group 2
- 2003–2004 - Unlisted Race (stakes $1 million)
- 2005 - Listed Race
- 2006 - Group 3
- 2008 - Group 2
- 2009 onwards - Group 1

=== Distance ===
- 1978–1986 – 1500 metres
- 1987 – 1350 metres
- 1988 – 1500 metres
- 1989–1991 – 1550 metres
- 1992–2002 – 1500 metres
- 2003 - onwards 1400 metres

=== Venue ===
- 1989–1991 - Race held at Canterbury Park

== Winners ==
=== Golden Rose Stakes ===
The following are past winners of the race.

- 2026 - Warwoven
- 2025 - Beiwacht
- 2024 - Broadsiding
- 2023 - Militarize
- 2022 - Jacquinot
- 2021 - In The Congo
- 2020 - Ole Kirk
- 2019 - Bivouac
- 2018 - The Autumn Sun
- 2017 - Trapeze Artist
- 2016 - Astern
- 2015 - Exosphere
- 2014 - Hallowed Crown
- 2013 - Zoustar
- 2012 - Epaulette
- 2011 - Manawanui
- 2010 - Toorak Toff
- 2009 - Denman
- 2008 - Duporth
- 2008 - Forensics
- 2007 - †race not held
- 2006 - Court Command
- 2005 - Paratroopers
- 2004 - Doonan
- 2003 - In Top Swing

† Race not held in that year due to Equine Influenza outbreak. The Sydney Turf Club moved the race to the autumn for the 2007–08 racing season and the race was won by Forensics in March 2008.

=== Peter Pan Stakes ===
- 2002 - Sportsman
- 2001 - Magic Albert
- 2000 - Dandify
- 1999 - Fairway
- 1998 - Huge Jet
- 1997 - On Air
- 1996 - race not held
- 1995 - Flying Spur
- 1994 - Brave Warrior
- 1993 - March Hare
- 1992 - Play Or Pay
- 1991 - Big Dreams
- 1990 - Imperial Magician
- 1989 - Party Mood
- 1988 - Swiftly Carson
- 1987 - Roman General
- 1986 - Drought
- 1985 - Handy Proverb
- 1984 - Black Ivory
- 1983 - Sir Dapper
- 1982 - Cossack Prince
- 1981 - Best Western
- 1980 - Impish Prince
- 1979 - Kingston Town
- 1978 - Kapalaran

== See also ==
- Colin Stephen Quality Handicap
- Golden Pendant
- Shannon Stakes
- List of Australian Group races
- Group races
