= Eight Carat =

British-bred Thoroughbred racehorse

- Sire: Pieces of Eight
- Grandsire: Relic
- Dam: Klairessa
- Damsire: Klairon
- Sex: Mare
- Foaled: 1975
- Country: United Kingdom
- Colour: Black

Awards
- International Broodmare of the Year (1996); New Zealand Broodmare of the Year (1995, 1996, 1997)

Honours
- New Zealand Racing Hall of Fame

Eight Carat (GB) (1975–2000) was a British-bred Thoroughbred broodmare. in Australasia. She produced five individual Group One winners, including Octagonal, Mouawad, Kaapstad, Diamond Lover and (Our) Marquise who had 28 stakes wins between them.

== Background ==
Eight Carat was a black or brown mare bred in Britain. She was sired by the Eclipse Stakes winner Pieces of Eight out of Klairessa. Klairessa had little success as a racehorse, but was a sister to both the King's Stand Stakes winner D'Urberville and the mare Lora who produced the 1000 Guineas winner On the House. In addition to Eight Carat, Klairessa also produced a colt by General Assembly named Knesset, who won the Ballyogan Stakes in 1988 and Habibti, the British champion sprinter and Horse of the Year in 1983.

== Racing career ==
Eight Carat raced for three seasons in England in the late 1970s but showed no discernible ability, failing to win in five races. She was sold for 9,400 guineas in December 1979.

== Breeding record ==
During her career as a broodmare, Eight Carat produced five Group One winners:

- Diamond Lover (1982, by Sticks and Stones), won the 1987 Railway Stakes (New Zealand)
- Kaapstad (1984, by Sir Tristram), won the 1987 VRC Sires Produce Stakes
- Marquise (1991, by Gold and Ivory), won the 1996 Captain Cook Stakes
- Octagonal (1992, by Zabeel), won ten Group Ones including the 1995 Cox Plate and 1997 Chipping Norton Stakes
- Mouawad (1993, by Zabeel), won the 1997 George Ryder Stakes, Futurity Stakes (Australia), Australian Guineas

== Daughters as broodmares ==
Her influence now extends to several generations and includes her daughters:

Diamond Lover (Aus, 1982 by Sticks and Stones)

Dam of:

- Tristalove (1990 by Sir Tristram): winner of 2 Group 1 races and Champion Race filly
- Don Eduardo (1998 by Zabeel): winner of the 2002 Group 1 AJC Derby
- Peruzzi (1992 by Zabeel): multiple Group winner
- Antwerp (1988 by Sir Tristram): multiple Listed winner.

Diamond Lover is the grand dam of:

- Viscount: Multiple Group 1 winner and Champion 2YO;
- Helsinborg: Listed winner;
- Viking Ruler: Group 1 winner;
- Kempinsky: Group 2 winner;
- Diamond Like: Listed winner.

She is also the great-grand of:

- Lucida: Listed winner
- De Beers: Group 1 winner.

Marquise

Dam of Shower of Roses, Group 1 winner.

Cotehele House (GB, 1980 by My Swanee)

Dam of:

- Danewin (b. 1991), winner of 5 Group 1 races, and Champion 3 year old of his year. Stood at stud in Australia's Hunter Valley and sired Group 1 winners, including Elegant Fashion, Vitesse Dane, County Tyrone, Toulouse-Lautrec and Excites.
- Commands, the winner of a Group 3 race. Also stood at stud in Australia's Hunter Valley and sired Melody Belle, Epaulette, Undue and Paratroopers.

Cotehele House is the grand dam of:

- Emerald Dream (Aus, 1996 Danehill-Theme Sing): winner of the 2002 New Zealand International Stakes and dam of Zed
- Special Bond: Listed winner
- Taimana: Group 2 winner.

Cotehele House is the grand dam of:

- Impaler: 2x Group 2 winner
- Listen Here: Listed winner.

Cotehele House is an ancestor of the horse Verry Elleegant, a winner of the Caulfield Cup and the Melbourne Cup. Verry Elleegant was inbred 4 × 4 to Cotehele House.

La Brillante

Born 1986 (by Sir Tristram): dam of Philidor, Listed winner.

Nine Carat

Born 1989 (by Sir Tristram): dam of Court of Jewels, Listed winner.

== Sons as sires ==
Eight Carat's sons: Octagonal, Kaapstad, Colombia and Mouawad have all stood at stud.

Octagonal

Octagonal stood at Woodlands Stud, Cootamundra, New South Wales and was the sire of the two Group One winning brothers:

- Niello, winner of the 2003 Spring Champion Stakes and 2004 Canterbury Guineas and Rosehill Guineas
- Lonhro, world champion miler of 2004, who also stood at Woodlands Stud.

Kaapstad

Kaapstad stood at Windsor Park Stud in New Zealand and was a leading sire and broodmare sire. At stud Kaapstad sired 43 individual stakes winners.

Colombia

Colombia stood at Newmarket Lodge in New Zealand. He sired:

- Addictive Habit, winner of the 2015 Livamol Classic and Foxbridge Plate.
- Chocolate Fish, the winner of the 2018 Great Northern Steeplechase (6300m).

Mouawad

Mouawad stood one season in Australia at Glenlogan Park Stud in Queensland, however due to fertility problems, he was re-sold again at public auction for A$525,000 to the former Domeland Syndicate and shipped to China. His fate is unknown following the collapse of the Chinese racing industry in 2005.

== Honours ==
Eight Carat won the New Zealand Broodmare of the Year a record-equalling three times from 1995 to 1997 due to the deeds of Octagonal and Mouawad.

In 1996 Eight Carat was named Broodmare of the Year by the international journal Owner-Breeder (USA).

Eight Carat died in 2000, aged 25 at Sir Patrick Hogan's Cambridge Stud. She is buried alongside Sir Tristram (IRE).
