= Blue Diamond Prelude Fillies =

- Class: Group 2
- Location: Caulfield Racecourse, Sandown Racecourse
- Inaugurated: 1982 (Listed race)
- Race type: Thoroughbred
- Sponsor: Sportsbet (2026)

Race information
- Distance: 1,100 metres
- Surface: Turf
- Track: Left-handed
- Qualification: Two year old fillies
- Weight: Set weights - 55½ kg
- Purse: $350,000 (2026)

The Blue Diamond Prelude Fillies is a Melbourne Racing Club Group 2 Thoroughbred horse race run under set weight conditions, for two-year-old fillies, over a distance of 1100 metres, held at Caulfield Racecourse in Melbourne, Australia in February.

== History ==
The race is a major preparatory race for the rich Blue Diamond Stakes held two weeks later.

Fillies that have captured the Blue Diamond Prelude – Blue Diamond Stakes double are:

- Love a Show (1983)
- Courtza (1989)
- Lady Jakeo (1993)
- Alinghi (2004)
- Samaready (2012)
- Earthquake (2014)
- Catchy (2017)
- Lyre (2019)
- Hayasugi (2024)

=== Grade ===
- 1982–1985 - Listed race
- 1986–2014 - Group 3
- 2015 onwards - Group 2

=== Distance ===
- 1982–1995 – 1100 metres
- 1996 – 1150 metres
- 1997 onwards - 1100 metres

=== Venue ===
- 1982–1995 - Caulfield Racecourse
- 1996 - Sandown Racecourse
- 1997–2022 - Caulfield Racecourse
- 2023 - Sandown Racecourse

== Winners ==
The following are past winners of the race.

- 2026 - Streisand
- 2025 - Palm Angel
- 2024 - Hayasugi
- 2023 - Exploring
- 2022 - Revolutionary Miss
- 2021 - Arcaded
- 2020 - Letzbeglam
- 2019 - Lyre
- 2018 - Embihaar
- 2017 - Catchy
- 2016 - Samara Dancer
- 2015 - Fontiton
- 2014 - Earthquake
- 2013 - Guelph
- 2012 - Samaready
- 2011 - One Last Dance
- 2010 - Psychologist
- 2009 - Rostova
- 2008 - Believe'n'succeed
- 2007 - Camarilla
- 2006 - Nediym's Glow
- 2005 - Dounting
- 2004 - Alinghi
- 2003 - Halibery
- 2002 - Brief Embrace
- 2001 - Faiza
- 2000 - Mannington
- 1999 - Card Queen
- 1998 - Piccadilly Circus
- 1997 - Rose Of Danehill
- 1996 - Merlene
- 1995 - Miamore
- 1994 - My Flashing Star
- 1993 - Lady Jakeo
- 1992 - Freedom Fields
- 1991 - Raise A Rhythm
- 1990 - Zedagal
- 1989 - Courtza
- 1988 - Startling Lass
- 1987 - Midnight Fever
- 1986 - Lockley's Daughter
- 1985 - Sudden
- 1984 - Rass Dancer
- 1983 - Love A Show
- 1982 - Formal Invitation

== See also ==
- List of Australian Group races
- Group races
