= Peter Pan (Australian horse) =

Australian-bred Thoroughbred racehorse

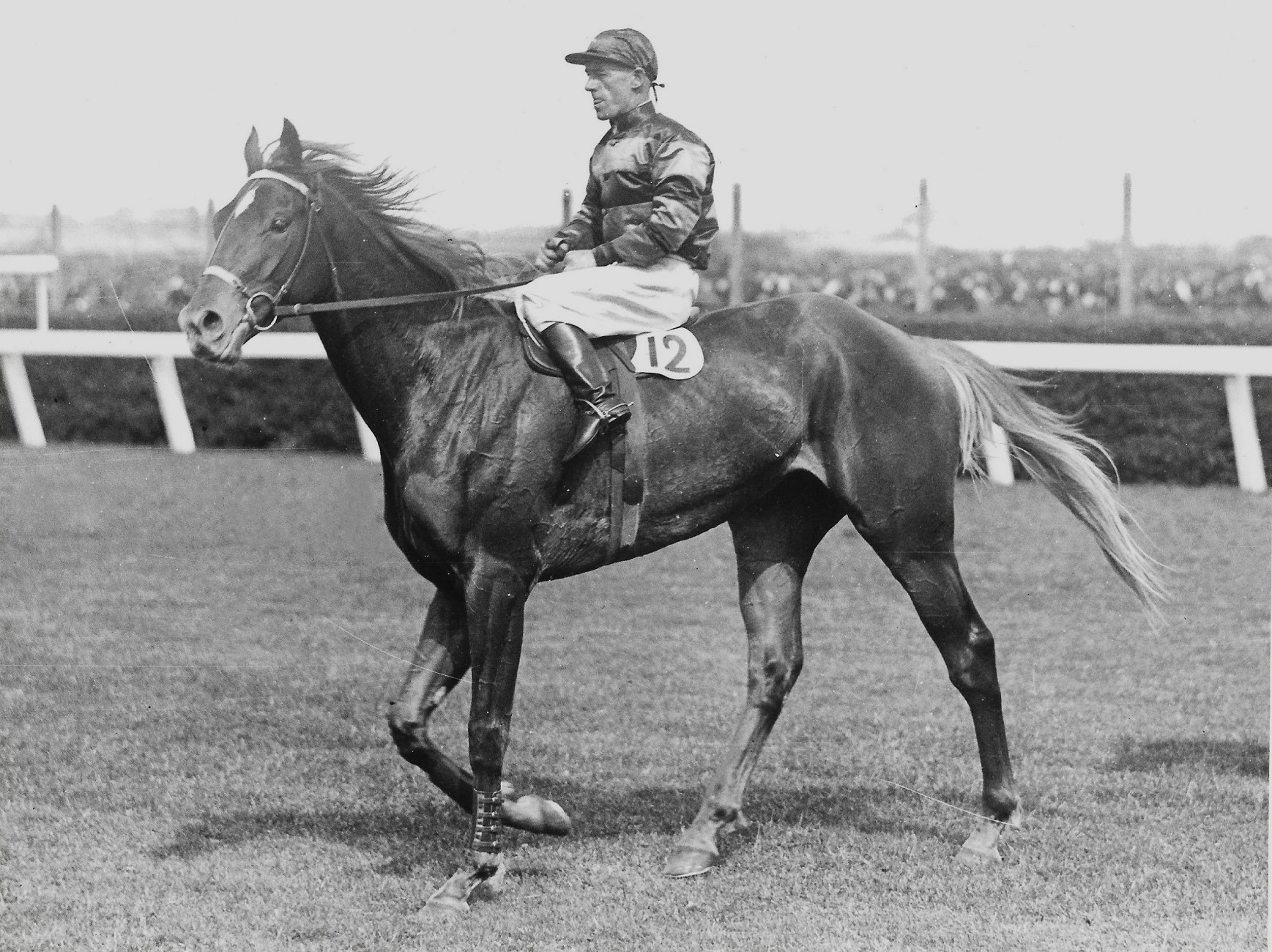
- Peter Pan and W. Duncan; Flemington Racecourse
- Sire: Pantheon*
- Grandsire: Tracery
- Dam: Alwina
- Damsire: St. Alwyne*
- Sex: Stallion
- Foaled: 1929
- Died: 1941
- Country: Australia
- Colour: Chestnut
- Breeder: Rodney R. Dangar
- Owner: Rodney R. Dangar
- Trainer: Frank McGrath, Sr.
- Record: 38: 23-6-1
- Earnings: £34,938

Major wins
- AJC Derby (1932); Melbourne Cup (1932, 1934); Melbourne Stakes (1932, 1934); Hill Stakes (1932, 1935); AJC Plate (1933); Randwick Stakes (1933, 1935); AJC St Leger (1933); AJC Cumberland Plate (1933, 1934); VRC Duke of Gloucester Cup (1934); AJC Autumn Plate (1934, 1935); All Aged Stakes (1935) (Australasian record); Rawson Stakes (1935); Craven Plate (1935); AJC Jubilee Cup (1935); AJC Spring Stakes (1935)

Honours
- Australian Racing Hall of Fame
- Last updated on 18 May 2009

Peter Pan (1929–1941) was a chestnut Australian Thoroughbred racehorse and stallion.

== Background ==
Peter Pan was sired by Pantheon (GB) out of Alwina by St Alwyne (GB). He was foaled at the Baroona Homestead near Singleton NSW in 1929. His sire, Pantheon was an outstanding racehorse winning 10 races from 44 starts in England and Australia. Alwina did not race, but was a good broodmare.

Peter Pan was known for having an unusual colouring for a Thoroughbred. He was chestnut with a blonde mane and tail. Frank McGrath's wife loved Peter Pan for his colouring and racing beauty.

== Racing career ==
Conditioned by future Hall of Fame trainer Frank McGrath, Sr., Peter Pan raced early in the 1930s during the Great Depression and with Phar Lap, Chatham and Rogilla, all household names at the time. Frank McGrath, Sr. and some others considered Peter Pan to possibly be a better horse than Phar Lap. Peter Pan was famous for winning the Melbourne Cup twice, in 1932 and 1934. In the running of the 1932 Melbourne Cup, Peter Pan, carrying Billy Duncan, was travelling at the rear of the pack when he clipped the heels of the horse in front and fell to his knees. Running behind him was his stablemate Denis Boy, who bumped the champion back onto his feet. From there, Peter Pan raced past the pack to take out the race by a neck. When he was led into the winner's circle, a grass stain was clearly visible on his face. In 1933, Peter Pan fought a near-fatal viral disease that swept Sydney's racing stables and did not contest the Melbourne Cup. Frank McGrath Snr. personally nursed the horse back to health. Peter Pan won his 1934 Melbourne Cup carrying Darby Munro at 9 st 10 lb on his back and from an outside draw on a heavy track, hence his long odds of 14/1. In 1932, he also won the AJC Derby and the MacKinnon Stakes. To win two Melbourne Cups is a rare feat, and this with his fine record gained him a place in the Australian Racing Hall of Fame. To date, he remains the only Melbourne Cup winning horse to win multiple Melbourne Cups in non-consecutive years. In 1935, Peter Pan suffered a recurrence of the illness that nearly killed him in 1933. Once again, Frank McGrath Snr. nursed him back to health but the horse was not his old self. Out of loyalty to the enormous public following that Peter Pan had gained, Rodney R. Dangar and McGrath agreed to start Peter Pan in the 1935 Melbourne Cup. The horse carried 10 st 6 lb (a pound more than carried by Carbine to win the 1890 Melbourne Cup) but finished 13th. He was retired to stud the following year.

== Image gallery ==
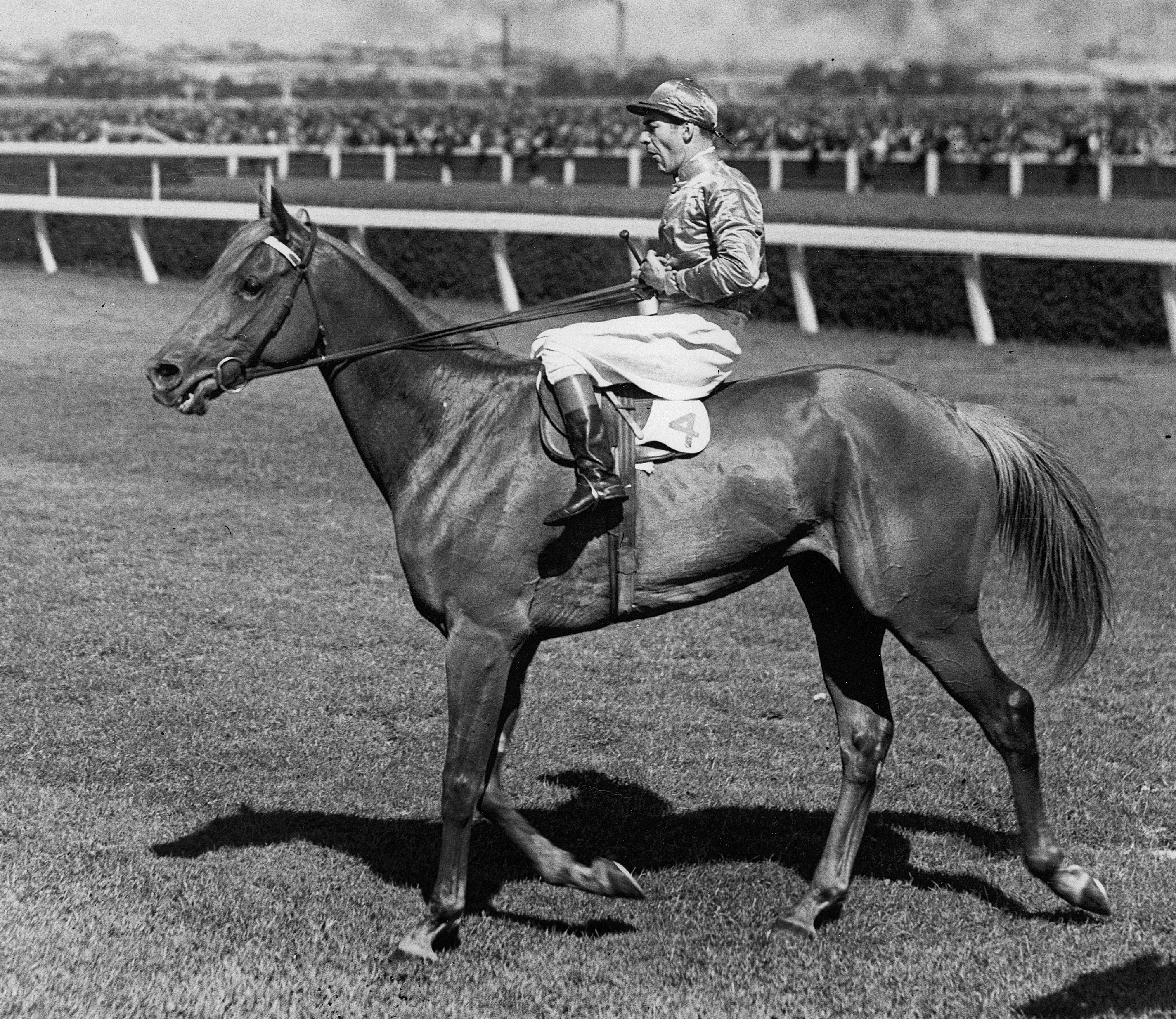
Peter Pan at Flemington jockey Darby Munro

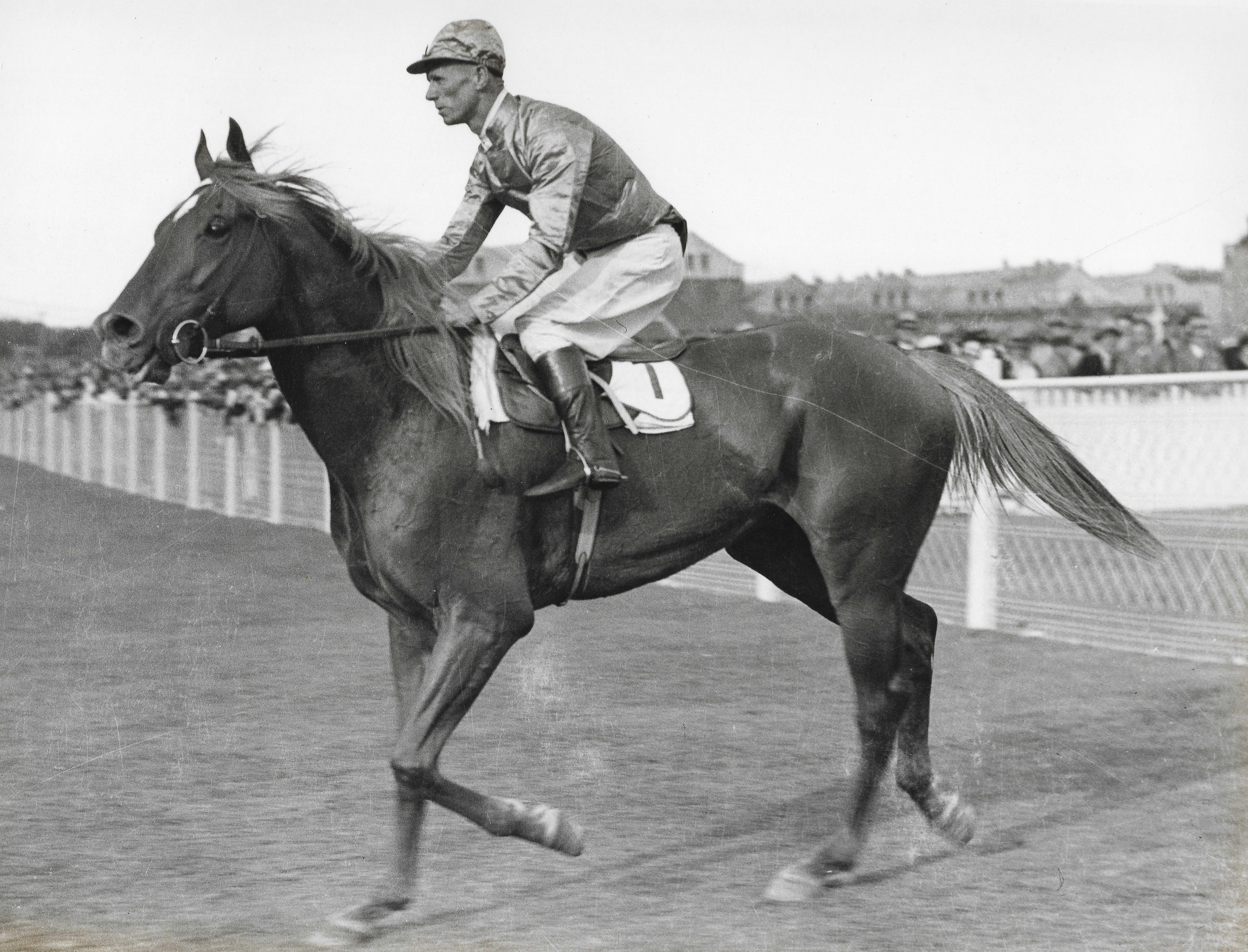
Peter Pan 1935 Spring Stakes jockey Jim Pike

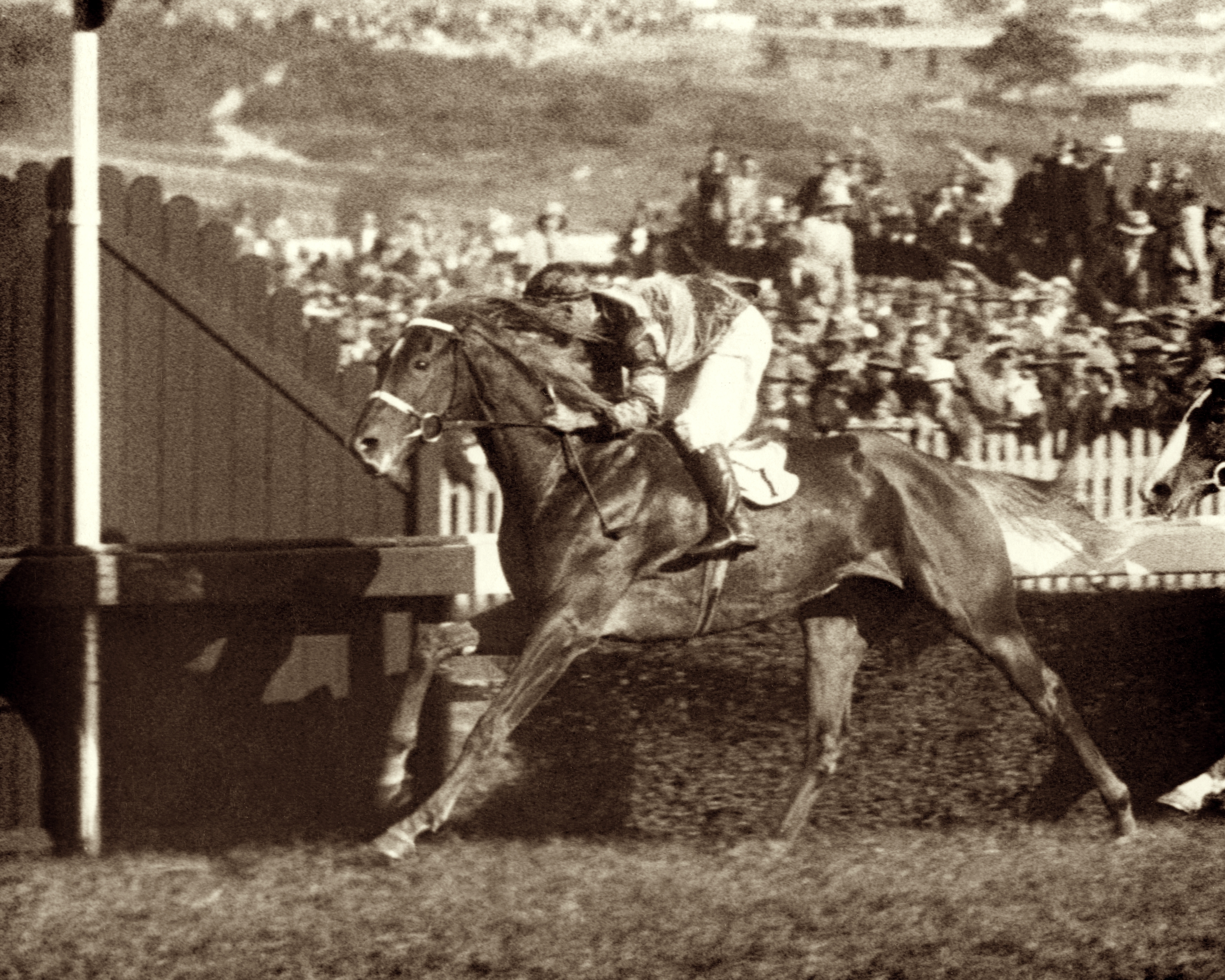
Peter Pan 1933 AJC St Leger jockey Jim Pike

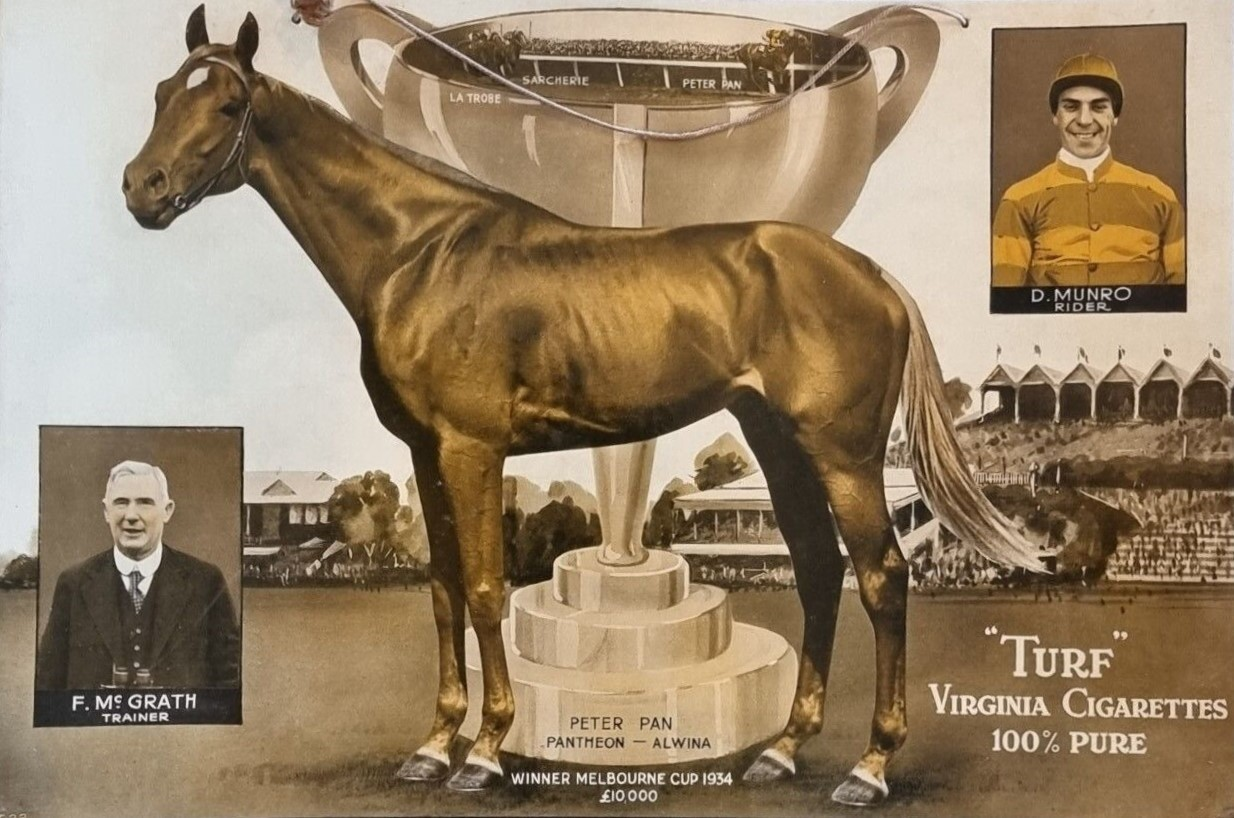
Peter Pan 1934 Melbourne Cup

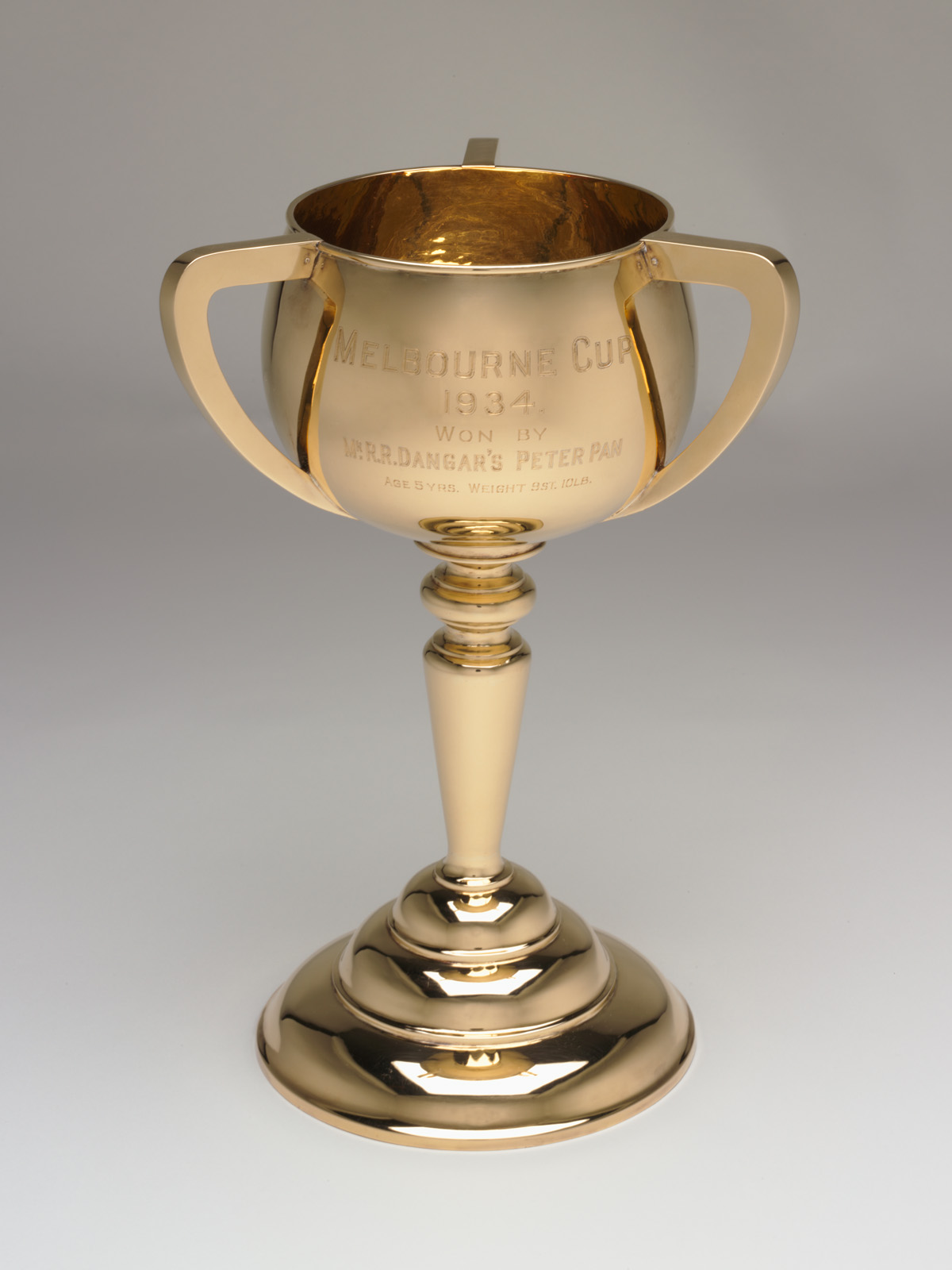
1934 Melbourne Cup won by Peter Pan

== 1933 and 1934 racebooks ==
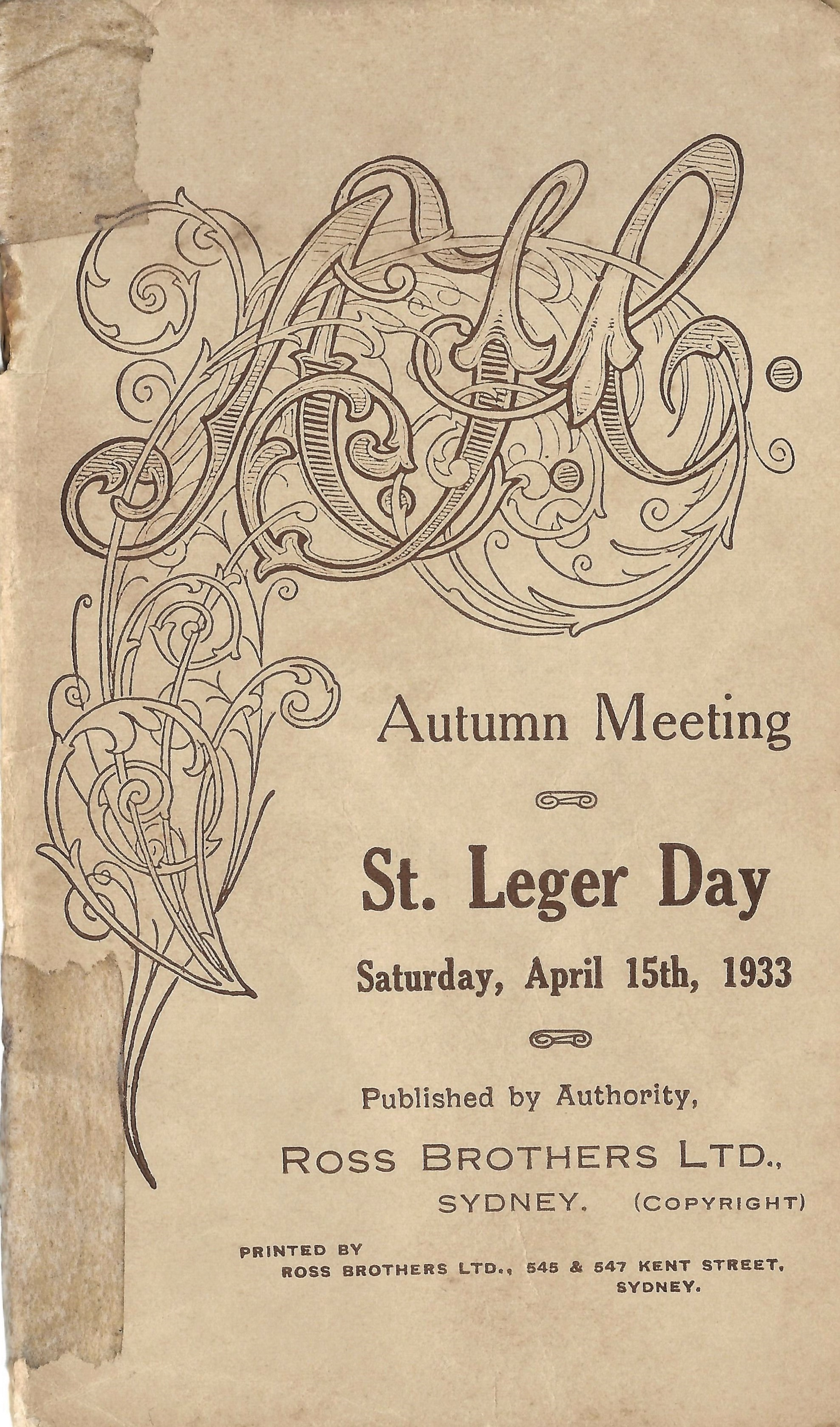
1933 AJC St Leger racebook

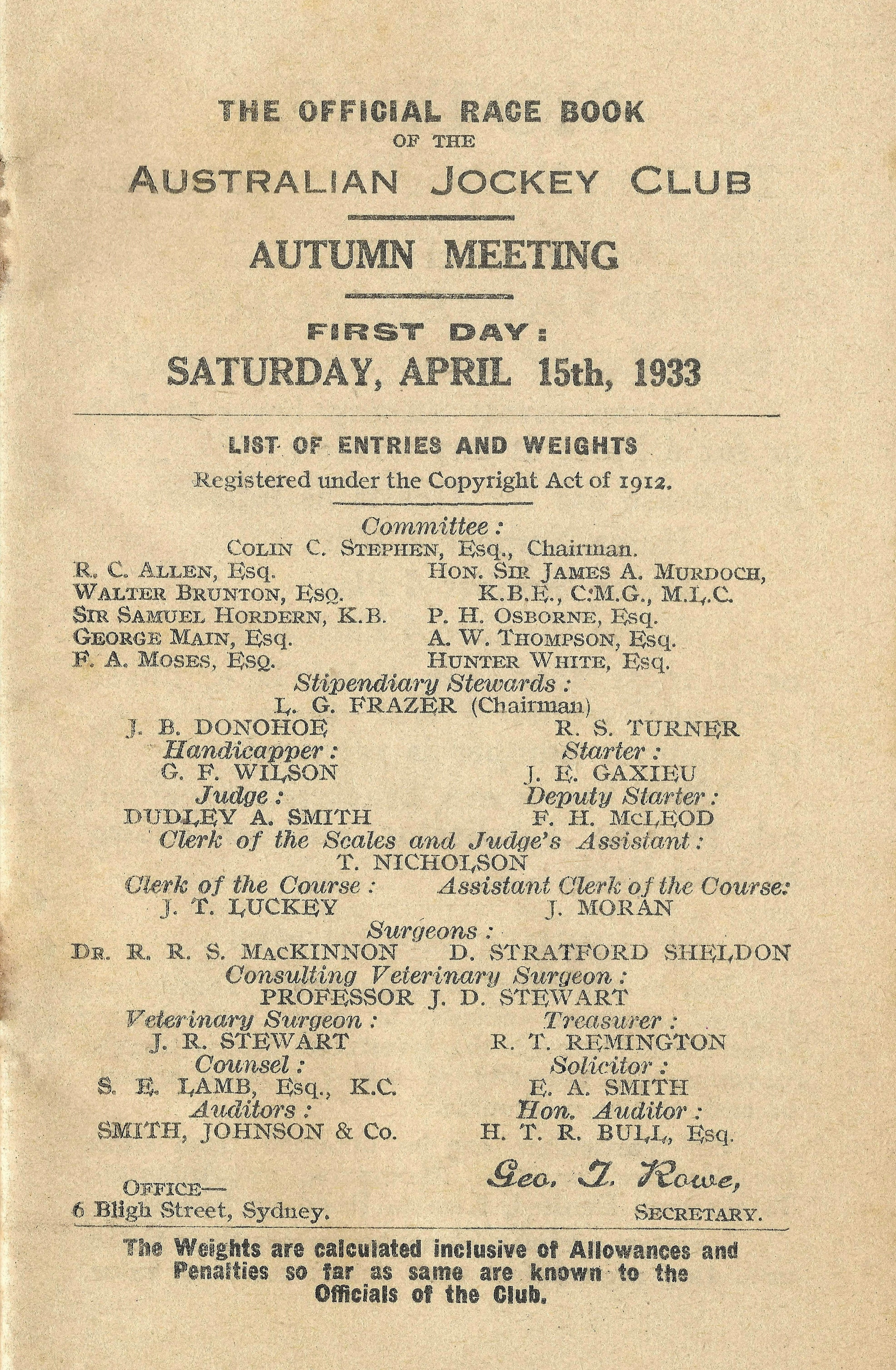
1933 AJC St Leger showing raceday officials

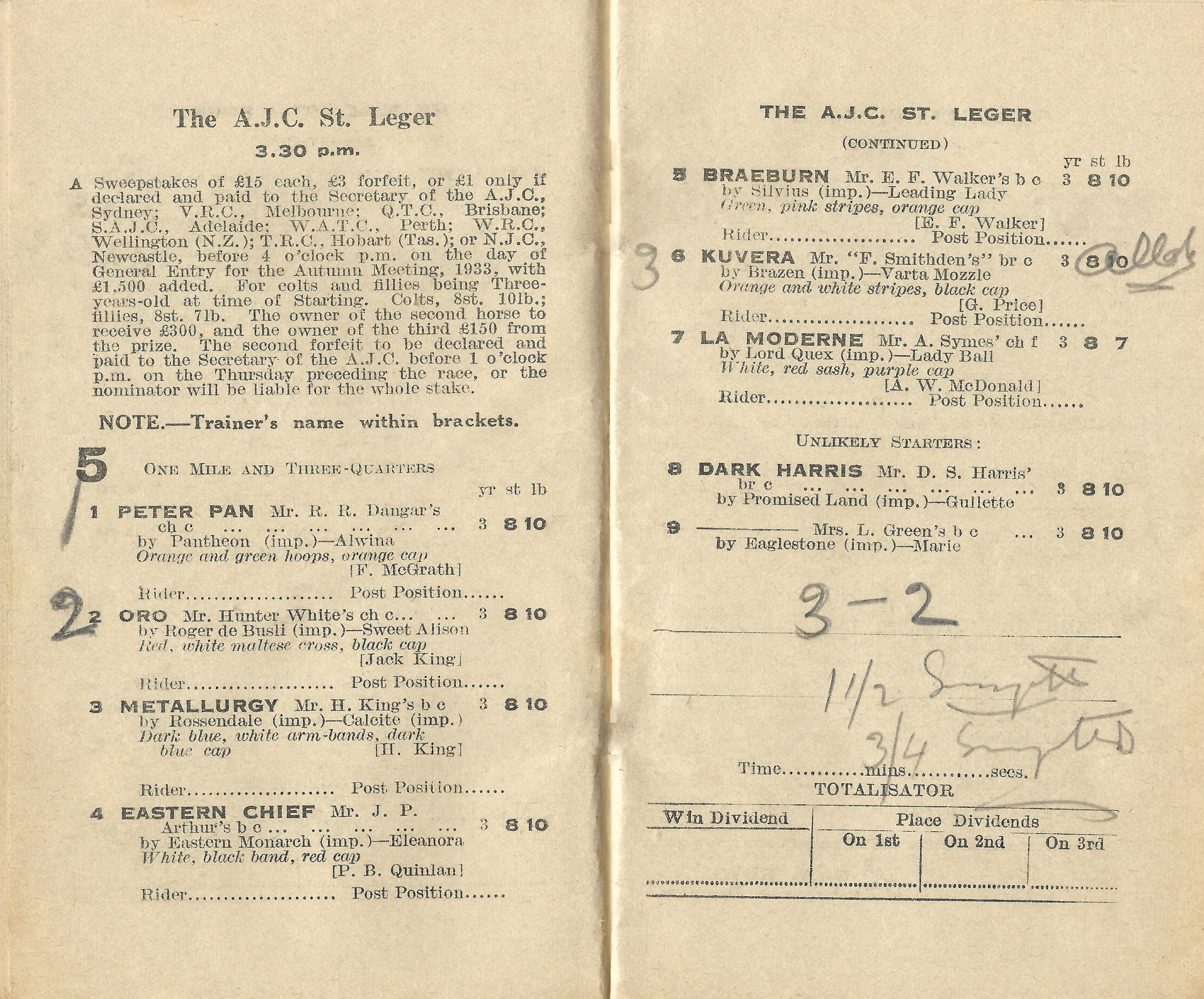
1933 AJC St Leger showing the winner, Peter Pan

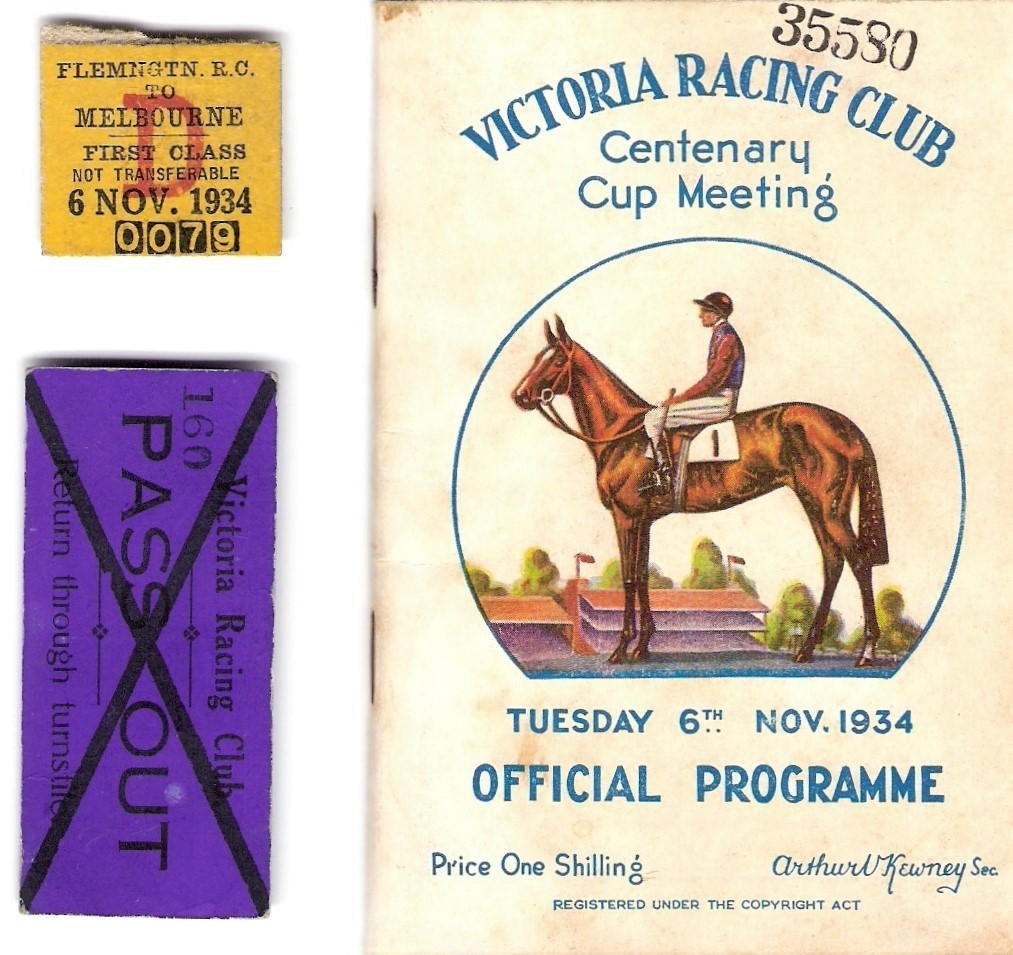
1934 VRC Melbourne Cup racebook with train & turnstile passes

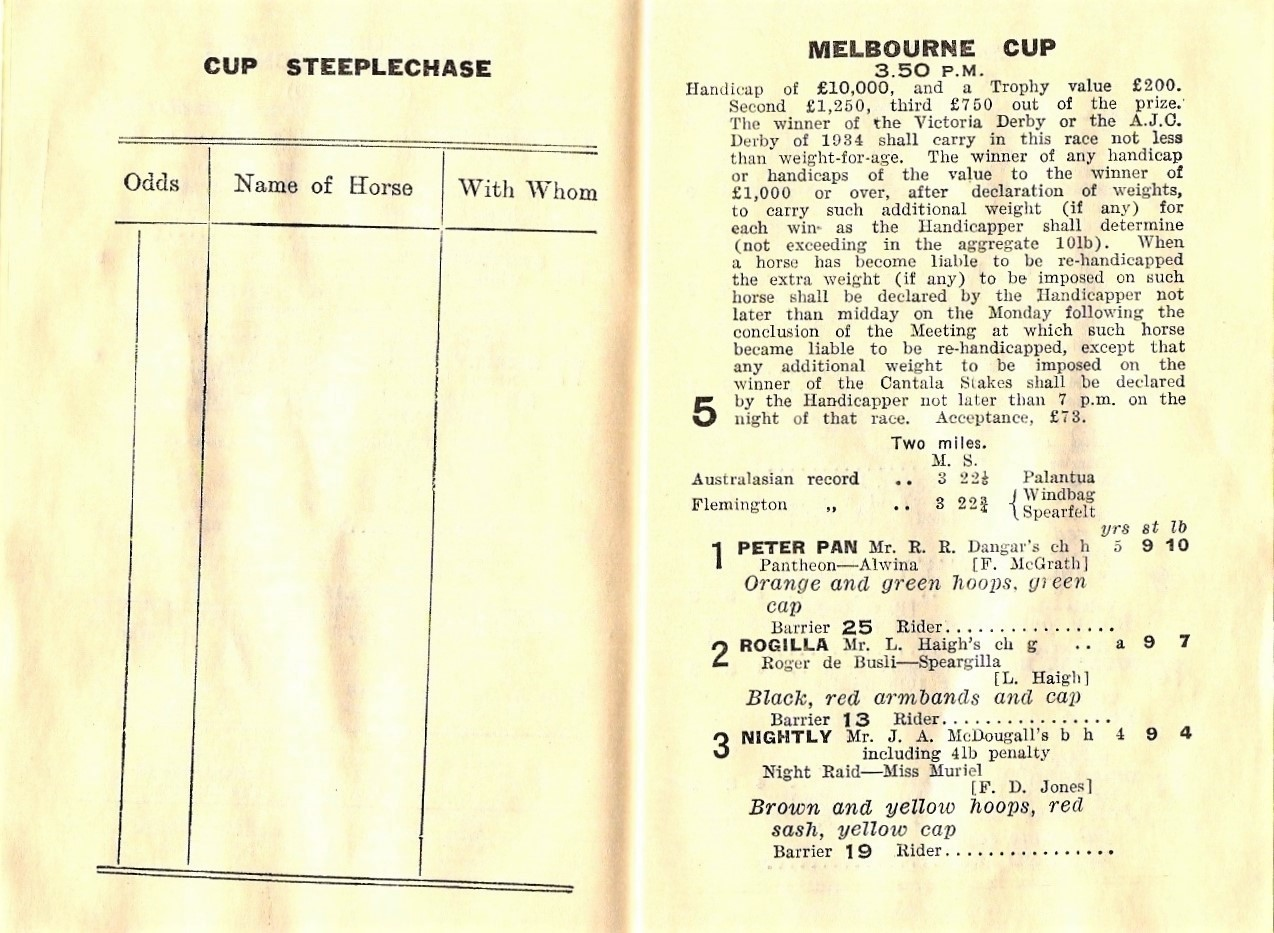
1934 VRC Melbourne Cup showing the winner, Peter Pan

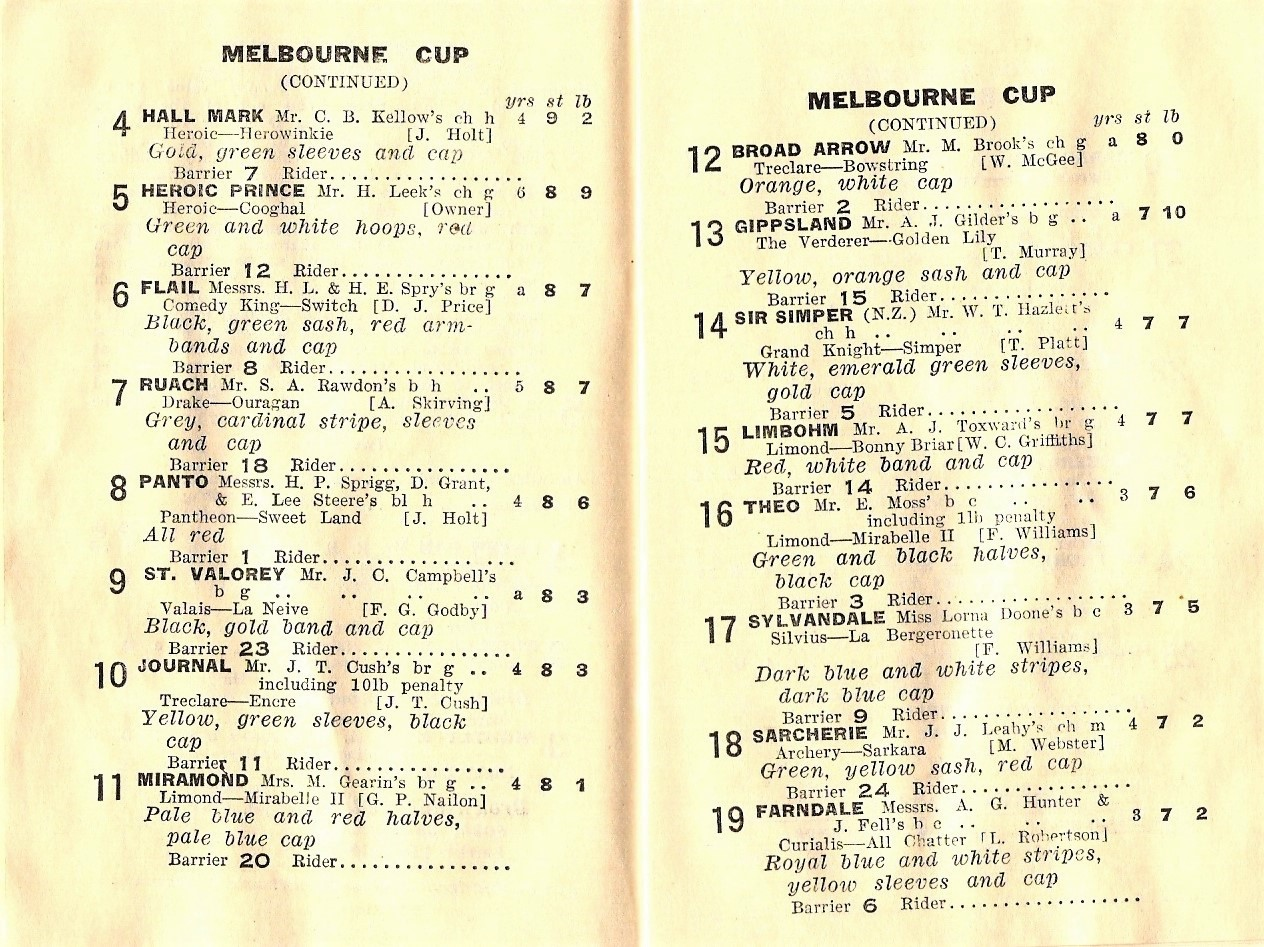
1934 VRC Melbourne Cup starters and results

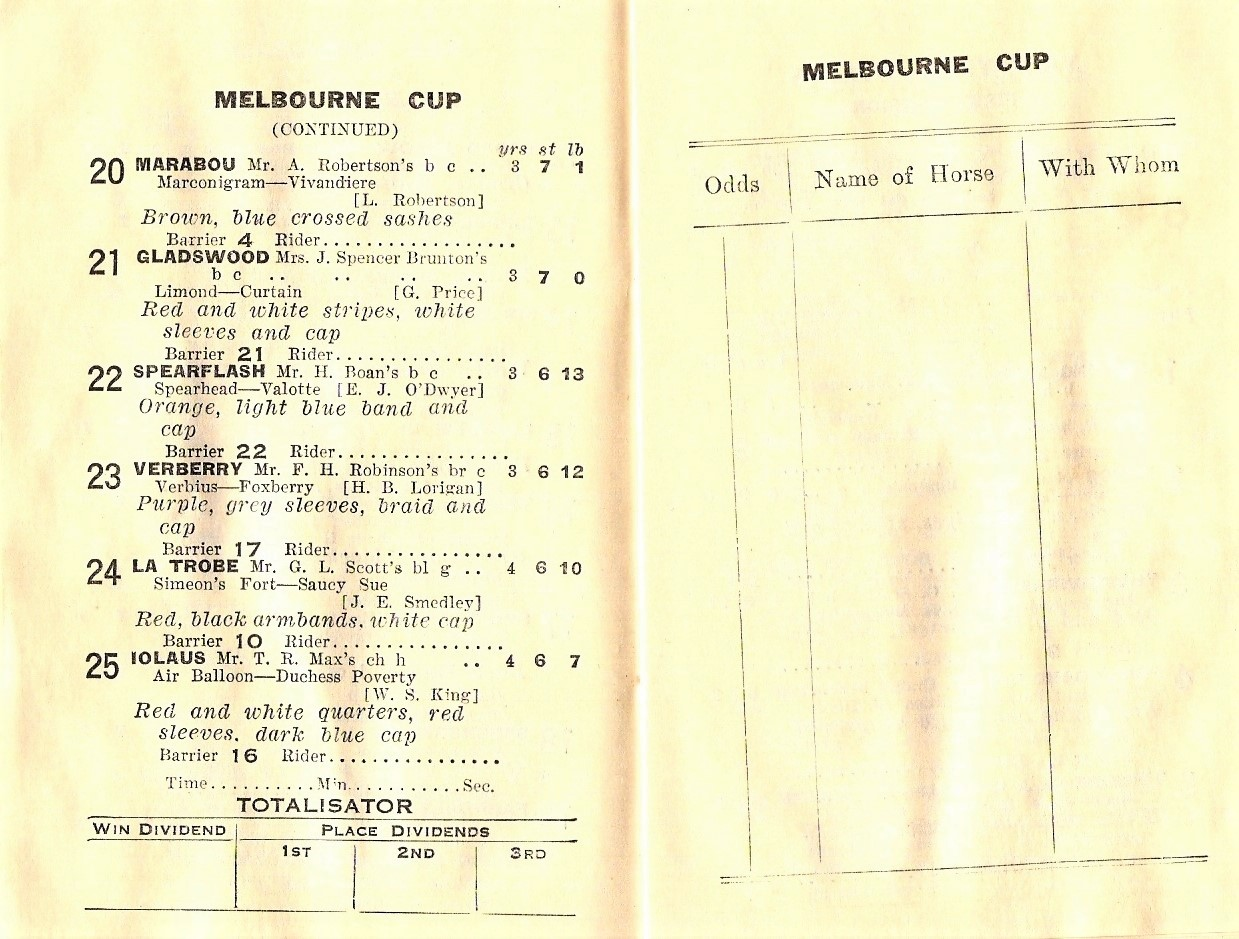
1934 VRC Melbourne Cup starters and results

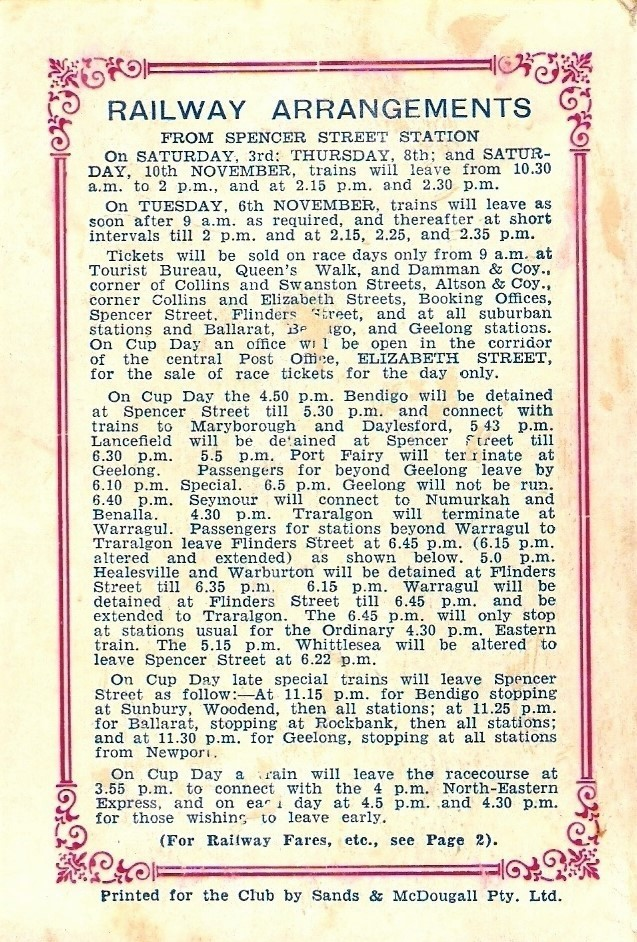
Back cover showing race day railway arrangements

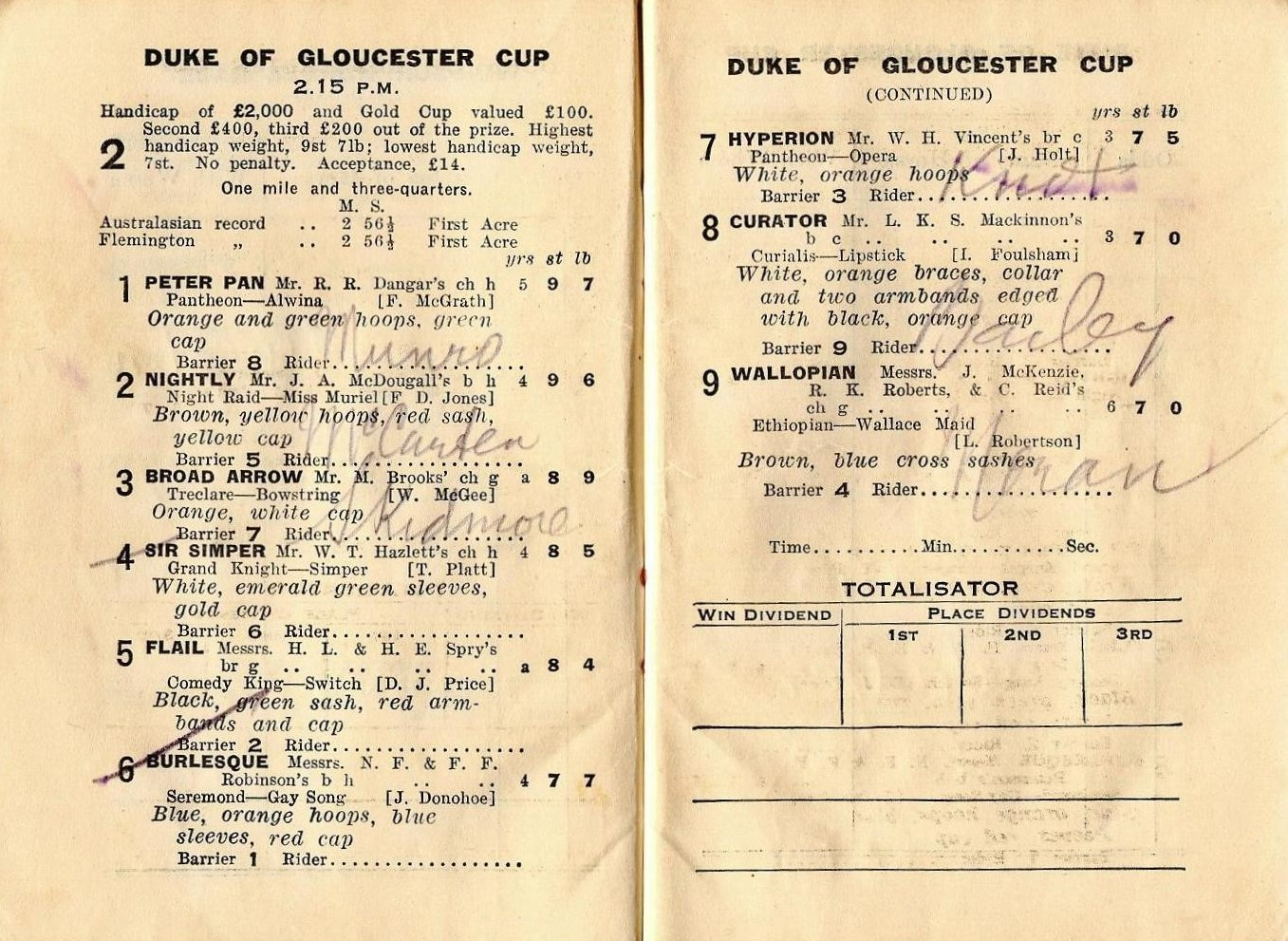
1934 VRC Duke of Gloucester Cup showing the winner, Peter Pan

== Stud career ==
Peter Pan stood at Rodney R. Dangar's country property Baroona, Whittingham, Singleton, New South Wales, where he exclusively covered his owner's mares. His stud career was cut short when he broke his leg in 1941 and was destroyed. Peter Pan is buried at Baroona, Whittingham, Singleton, New South Wales.

Peter Pan sired the stakeswinners Grampian, Peter and Precept, who won the Moonee Valley Stakes and VRC Derby. Peter won the Williamstown Cup and placed 2nd in the 1944 Melbourne Cup.

== Honours ==
In 1978 he was honoured on a postage stamp issued by Australia Post.
