= Pippie =

Australian thoroughbred racehorse

- Sire: Written Tycoon
- Grandsire: Iglesia
- Dam: Coupe Express
- Damsire: Ne Coupez Pas
- Sex: Mare
- Foaled: 13 October 2015
- Country: Australia
- Colour: Chestnut
- Breeder: Eureka Stud
- Owner: Heran Racing
- Trainer: John & Chris Meagher
- Record: 15: 6-2-0
- Earnings: A$1,236,950

Major wins
- Cockram Stakes (2019); Oakleigh Plate (2020); Moir Stakes (2020)

Pippie (foaled 13 October 2015) is a multiple Group 1 winning Australian bred thoroughbred racehorse.

== Background ==
Pippie was bred at Eureka Stud in Cambooya, Queensland and later sold through the 2017 Inglis Classic Yearling sale in Sydney. She was purchased for A$60,000 by her trainer John Meagher.

== Racing career ==
=== 2017/18: two-year-old season ===
Pippie made her race debut on the 5 July 2018 in a 1,000 metre race at Cranbourne. Taken straight to the front by jockey Noel Callow, Pippie streaked away from her rivals to win by 5 lengths.

=== 2018/19: three-year-old season ===
On 4 August 2018, Pippie contested a 1,000 metre handicap for three year old fillies at Moonee Valley. Jumping slowly from the barriers she settled midfield throughout the race. After briefly hitting the front in the home straight under Noel Callow, she was eventually passed by Multaja from the Godolphin stable and finished in 2nd position beaten by 2 lengths.

On 18 August 2018, Pippie contested her first stakes race in the Group 3 Quezette Stakes, run over 1,100 metres at Caulfield. Regular jockey Noel Callow was replaced as rider for Ben Melham in this race. Starting the $3.80 favourite Pippie raced on speed but faded to finish in 7th place, beaten by eventual multiple Group 1 winning mare Sunlight.

After her run in the Quezette Stakes, Pippie pulled up sore and it was decided by her trainers to give her a lengthy break. Co-trainer Chris Meagher said, “Pippie pulled up sore from the Quezette and we decided to give her plenty of time off. She’s definitely maturing, but we still have to treat her with kid gloves as she can lighten off quite quickly.”

Pippie resumed her racing career some 11 months later on the 13 July 2019, when she contested a 1,200 metre race at Doomben. Leading all the way, Pippie won by a margin of three and a quarter lengths.

=== 2019/20: four-year-old season ===
After her first up win at Doomben, Pippie had a month between runs, next contesting a handicap race at Caulfield on the 17 August 2018. She again led all the way to win by three lengths. Co-trainer Chris Meagher commented on her speed after the race, “She has a high cruising speed. She puts herself there and eliminates bad luck. For her to do that today, pretty well untouched was quite impressive.”

Two weeks later Pippie started the $2.05 favourite in the 2019 Cockram Stakes at Caulfield. This would prove to be Pippie's first win at stakes level in the Group 3 leading all the way to win by a margin of one and a quarter lengths.

At her next start in the How Now Stakes at Caulfield on the 21 September 2019, Pippie was attempting to win her fourth race in a row. Starting the odds-on favourite at $1.95, Pippie jumped well and was taken straight to the front, however upon straightening she was eased down by jockey Ben Melham finishing well behind the rest of the field. Melham later stated that he felt the horse had injured herself, although a post-race veterinary examination revealed no abnormalities.

With no other explanation than the horse putting in a bad run in the How Now Stakes, Pippie then contested the Begonia Belle Stakes at Flemington on the 2 November 2019. Ridden by Damien Oliver, Pippie was run down late to be beaten one and a quarter lengths into second place.

After a three month spell, Pippie's next race would be her first at Group 1 level in the Oakleigh Plate on 22 February 2020. With regular jockey Ben Melham unable to make the weight allocated of 52 kg, Linda Meech was selected to ride her in the race. Pippie began brilliantly from her wide barrier and crossed the field of 18 runners to lead in the 1,100 metre race. She was full of running around the home turn and opened up a winning break halfway up the home straight to beat the fast-finishing Zoutori by a half-length. Her winning time of 1:01.93 was just 0.20 seconds outside the track record.

Pippie's next run would be in the William Reid Stakes at Moonee Valley on the 20 March 2020 over 1,200 metres. Despite co-trainer Chris Meagher saying pre-race that Pippie “will definitely lead”, she was unable to find the lead and was beaten three and a quarter lengths into 4th placing after starting at odds of $13.

Pippie's next assignments were to be the Robert Sangster Stakes and The Goodwood in South Australia, however due to the COVID-19 pandemic in Australia, travel restrictions were put in place. Pippie instead contested the $200,000 Vobis Gold Sprint at Caulfield on the 18 April 2020 over 1,200 metres. Installed a $2 favourite due to the set weight conditions of the race, Pippie showed her customary speed to lead the race however was a spent force soon after straightening finishing in 6th position. Co-trainer Chris Meagher stated he was disappointed with the run and that the horse would be spelled immediately.

=== 2020/21: five-year-old season ===
After a five month break, Pippie resumed racing on the 25 September 2020, in the Moir Stakes over 1,000 metres at Moonee Valley. Ridden by jockey Damian Lane and starting the second favourite at odds of $6.50, Pippie jumped straight to the lead and led all the way to win her second Group 1, defeating the fast finishing Trekking by three quarters of a length. Jockey Lane said after the race, “Never been on one quicker early than Pippie”.

A month later Pippie contested the Manikato Stakes. After jumping awkwardly she managed to muster speed to lead the field however faded into 7th position beaten over six lengths by multiple Group 1 winner Hey Doc. Jockey Damian Lane said after the race, “She just didn’t break as clean as she normally does and wasn’t as quick into stride, so I was forced to use her early and it just cost me late in the race.”

After a four month break, Pippie resumed racing on the 13 February 2021 in the Black Caviar Lightning at Flemington. She showed her customary speed to lead the field however faded late to finish into sixth position beaten just over four lengths by Nature Strip.

Pippie's final start of her career was on the 19 March 2021 at Moonee Valley in the William Reid Stakes. Starting at odds of $19, Pippie again led the field up until the 400m mark where she was run down and beaten by a margin of just over 4 lengths. Jockey Noel Callow said after the race, "She ran really good. Just got softened up a little bit in the middle stages. She's going to be mum now so hopefully she produces a good horse."

== Stud career ==
After retiring from racing, Pippie was sold for $1.8 million to Cressfield Stud in the Hunter Region of New South Wales. Her first covering was by stallion Exceed And Excel.

== Pedigree ==
Pedigree of Pippie (AUS) 2015
Sire Written Tycoon (AUS) 2002	Iglesia (AUS); 1995	Last Tycoon	Try My Best
Sire Written Tycoon (AUS) 2002	Iglesia (AUS); 1995	Last Tycoon	Mill Princess
Sire Written Tycoon (AUS) 2002	Iglesia (AUS); 1995	Yodells	Marscay
Sire Written Tycoon (AUS) 2002	Iglesia (AUS); 1995	Yodells	Yodelling Lady
Sire Written Tycoon (AUS) 2002	Party Miss (AUS); 1991	Kenmare	Kalamoun
Sire Written Tycoon (AUS) 2002	Party Miss (AUS); 1991	Kenmare	Belle of Ireland
Sire Written Tycoon (AUS) 2002	Party Miss (AUS); 1991	Miss Entertainer	Vain
Sire Written Tycoon (AUS) 2002	Party Miss (AUS); 1991	Miss Entertainer	Viveza
Dam Coupe Express (AUS) 2008	Ne Coupez Pas (USA); 1996	Nureyev	Northern Dancer
Dam Coupe Express (AUS) 2008	Ne Coupez Pas (USA); 1996	Nureyev	Special
Dam Coupe Express (AUS) 2008	Ne Coupez Pas (USA); 1996	Soundings	Mr. Prospector
Dam Coupe Express (AUS) 2008	Ne Coupez Pas (USA); 1996	Soundings	Ocean's Answer
Dam Coupe Express (AUS) 2008	Gal Express (AUS); 2000	Success Express	Hold Your Peace
Dam Coupe Express (AUS) 2008	Gal Express (AUS); 2000	Success Express	Au Printemps
Dam Coupe Express (AUS) 2008	Gal Express (AUS); 2000	Zofagal	Zoffany
Dam Coupe Express (AUS) 2008	Gal Express (AUS); 2000	Zofagal	Merry Maggy
