= Ole Kirk =

Australian thoroughbred racehorse

- Sire: Written Tycoon
- Grandsire: Iglesia
- Dam: Naturale
- Damsire: Bel Esprit
- Sex: Stallion
- Foaled: 9 September 2017
- Country: Australia
- Colour: Brown
- Breeder: Gilgai Farm
- Owner: Werrett Bloodstock et al.
- Trainer: Michael, Wayne & John Hawkes
- Record: 11: 3-2-3
- Earnings: A$2,159,100

Major wins
- Golden Rose Stakes (2020); Caulfield Guineas (2020)

Awards
- Australian Champion Three Year Old Colt/Gelding (2020/21)

Ole Kirk (foaled 9 September 2017) is a multiple Group 1 winning Australian-bred Thoroughbred racehorse and breeding stallion.

== Background ==
Ole Kirk is out of the unraced mare Naturale, who is Black Caviar's full sister, making him a nephew to the champion sprinter.

He was sold at the 2019 Inglis Melbourne Premier Yearling Sale for A$675,000.

== Racing career ==
=== 2019/20: two-year-old season ===
Ole Kirk made his debut on the 15 February 2020 in the Listed Talindert Stakes at Flemington. Starting at odds of 30/1, Ole Kirk settled behind the leaders and hit the line hard between runners to win by a short neck.

Three weeks later Ole Kirk contested the Sires' Produce Stakes again at Flemington over 1,400 metres. On this occasion he finished in third placing with jockey Dwayne Dunn critical of how the race panned out, stating after the race, "I thought I was giving him the right run, but the runs just didn't open up today. He should have won easily."

Ole Kirk then travelled to Sydney and contested two Group 1 races at Randwick. In the Sires' Produce Stakes he finished fourth and in the Champagne Stakes he finished third, on both occasions beaten by King's Legacy.

=== 2020/21: three-year-old season ===
After a four-month break, Ole Kirk resumed racing at Rosehill in the Rosebud on the 8 August 2020 where he finished in second placing. He finished second again at Rosehill a month later in The Run To The Rose.

On the 26 September 2020 Ole Kirk contested the A$1,000,000 Golden Rose Stakes at Rosehill. He finished strongly to win by a head margin over stablemate North Pacific.

On the 10 October 2020 Ole Kirk started favourite in the Caulfield Guineas. This race would prove to be his second Group 1 victory, claiming a last stride victory. Jockey William Pike said afterwards, "Today was my first ever sit on him. I was so grateful for the support. We had to zig and zag a little bit, but I'm pretty happy we got the job done.”

After unplaced runs in the Futurity Stakes and Australian Guineas, Ole Kirk was retired from racing to commence stud duties.

== Stud career ==
A majority share was purchased of Ole Kirk by Vinery Stud. He commenced stallion duties at their stud in the Hunter Region of New South Wales in 2021 for an initial service fee of $55,000.

=== Notable progeny ===
c = colt, f = filly, g = gelding

Foaled	Name	Sex	Major wins
2022	Ole Dancer	f	The Thousand Guineas

== Pedigree ==
Pedigree of Ole Kirk (AUS) 2017
Sire Written Tycoon (AUS) 2002	Iglesia (AUS); 1995	Last Tycoon	Try My Best
Sire Written Tycoon (AUS) 2002	Iglesia (AUS); 1995	Last Tycoon	Mill Princess
Sire Written Tycoon (AUS) 2002	Iglesia (AUS); 1995	Yodells	Marscay
Sire Written Tycoon (AUS) 2002	Iglesia (AUS); 1995	Yodells	Yodelling Lady
Sire Written Tycoon (AUS) 2002	Party Miss (AUS); 1991	Kenmare	Kalamoun
Sire Written Tycoon (AUS) 2002	Party Miss (AUS); 1991	Kenmare	Belle of Ireland
Sire Written Tycoon (AUS) 2002	Party Miss (AUS); 1991	Miss Entertainer	Vain
Sire Written Tycoon (AUS) 2002	Party Miss (AUS); 1991	Miss Entertainer	Viveza
Dam Naturale (AUS) 2012	Bel Esprit (AUS); 1999	Royal Academy	Nijinsky II
Dam Naturale (AUS) 2012	Bel Esprit (AUS); 1999	Royal Academy	Crimson Saint
Dam Naturale (AUS) 2012	Bel Esprit (AUS); 1999	Bespoken	Vain
Dam Naturale (AUS) 2012	Bel Esprit (AUS); 1999	Bespoken	Vin d'Amour
Dam Naturale (AUS) 2012	Helsinge (AUS); 2001	Desert Sun	Green Desert
Dam Naturale (AUS) 2012	Helsinge (AUS); 2001	Desert Sun	Solar
Dam Naturale (AUS) 2012	Helsinge (AUS); 2001	Scandinavia	Snippets
Dam Naturale (AUS) 2012	Helsinge (AUS); 2001	Scandinavia	Star of Norway
