= Booker (horse) =

Australian Thoroughbred racehorse

- Sire: Written Tycoon (AUS)
- Grandsire: Iglesia (AUS)
- Dam: Noondie (AUS)
- Damsire: Flying Spur (AUS)
- Sex: Mare
- Foaled: 2014
- Country: Australia
- Colour: Bay or Brown
- Breeder: AG Freebairn
- Owner: BM & MM Griffiths, NS & GC Psaltis, WH & AM Rigg, AG & EL Freebairn
- Trainer: Matthew Ellerton & Simon Zahra (2017-2019); Gerald Ryan (2020)
- Record: 22: 4–4–1
- Earnings: A$ 856,150

Major wins
- Thousand Guineas Prelude (2017); Kevin Hayes Stakes (2018); Oakleigh Plate (2019)

Booker (foaled 26 August 2014) is a Group 1 winning Australian thoroughbred racehorse.

== Background ==
Booker was sold for A$230,000 at the 2016 Inglis Australian Premier Yearling Sale.

== Racing career ==
In 2019, Booker won the Group 1 Oakleigh Plate at Caulfield Racecourse at odds of 18/1.

== Breeding career ==
After retiring from racing in 2020, Booker was sold to Coolmore Stud as a broodmare for A$1,600,000.

Booker gave birth to her first foal in 2021, a colt by stallion I Am Invincible. The colt was named Railway Man and had his first start when unplaced at Randwick on the 31 January 2024.

== Pedigree ==
Pedigree of Booker (AUS) 2014
Sire Written Tycoon (AUS) 2002	Iglesia (AUS); 1995	Last Tycoon	Try My Best
Sire Written Tycoon (AUS) 2002	Iglesia (AUS); 1995	Last Tycoon	Mill Princess
Sire Written Tycoon (AUS) 2002	Iglesia (AUS); 1995	Yodells	Marscay
Sire Written Tycoon (AUS) 2002	Iglesia (AUS); 1995	Yodells	Yodelling Lady
Sire Written Tycoon (AUS) 2002	Party Miss (AUS); 1991	Kenmare	Kalamoun
Sire Written Tycoon (AUS) 2002	Party Miss (AUS); 1991	Kenmare	Belle Of Ireland
Sire Written Tycoon (AUS) 2002	Party Miss (AUS); 1991	Miss Entertainer	Vain
Sire Written Tycoon (AUS) 2002	Party Miss (AUS); 1991	Miss Entertainer	Viveza
Dam Noondie (AUS) 2008	Flying Spur (AUS); 1992	Danehill	Danzig
Dam Noondie (AUS) 2008	Flying Spur (AUS); 1992	Danehill	Razyana
Dam Noondie (AUS) 2008	Flying Spur (AUS); 1992	Rolls	Mr. Prospector
Dam Noondie (AUS) 2008	Flying Spur (AUS); 1992	Rolls	Grand Luxe
Dam Noondie (AUS) 2008	Creatrix (AUS); 1999	Umatilla	Miswaki
Dam Noondie (AUS) 2008	Creatrix (AUS); 1999	Umatilla	Dancing Show
Dam Noondie (AUS) 2008	Creatrix (AUS); 1999	Rehearsed	Century
Dam Noondie (AUS) 2008	Creatrix (AUS); 1999	Rehearsed	Gaelic Dancer
