= King's Legacy =

Australian Thoroughbred racehorse

- Sire: Redoute's Choice
- Grandsire: Danehill
- Dam: Breakfast In Bed
- Damsire: Hussonet
- Sex: Colt
- Foaled: 1 September 2017
- Country: Australia
- Colour: Bay
- Breeder: Segenhoe Stud
- Owner: James Harron Bloodstock Colts, BC Bateman, Love Racing, P Mehrten, Doyles Breeding & Racing, SN Gillard, G1G Racing & Breeding, D Saab, Rockingham Thoroughbreds, JA & FA Ingham, Pinecliff Racing
- Trainer: Peter & Paul Snowden
- Record: 12 : 3–0–2
- Earnings: A$ 1,013,100

Major wins
- B J McLachlan Plate (2019); Sires' Produce Stakes (2020); Champagne Stakes (2020)

King's Legacy (foaled 1 September 2017) is a multiple Group 1 winning Australian thoroughbred racehorse.

== Background ==
King's Legacy was the third highest priced lot sold at the 2019 Magic Millions Yearling Sale. He was purchased by James Harron Bloodstock for $1.4 million.

== Racing career ==
=== 2019/20: two-year-old season ===
King's Legacy began his racing career in a mid-week maiden at Rosehill Gardens Racecourse finishing in third placing. The colt then started at the odds of 5/1 in the B J McLachlan Plate at Eagle Farm Racecourse. Under the guidance of jockey Kerrin McEvoy the horse won by a margin of half a length.

As a result of this win, King's Legacy gained a start in the Magic Millions Classic for two-year-olds a fortnight later. He finished in 5th placing. After a break of two months, he next started in the Golden Slipper Stakes at the odds of 80/1 and was beaten some 7 lengths into 9th placing. After the race jockey Damian Lane stated, "They were a little bit sharp for him but he ran well, he's looking for a little bit further.”

Two weeks later, he contested the Group 1 Sires' Produce Stakes. After settling in last position for jockey Hugh Bowman, the horse appreciated the extra 200 metres of the Sires' to win by half a length at the odds of 18/1. Trainer Peter Snowden stated after the race, "He was always going to be a horse that was going to get better at 1400 metres, it is exciting to get the group One with him because he is a very valuable colt now.”

After his success in the Sires', King’s Legacy became the 38th individual Group 1 winner for his sire Redoute's Choice who died 12 months previously.

After winning the Sires', King's Legacy was successful in his second Group 1 in winning the Champagne Stakes.

=== 2020/21: three-year-old season ===
King's Legacy resumed on the 12 September 2020 when finishing last of 7 runners in The Run To The Rose. He showed much improvement at his next start in the Golden Rose when finishing 3rd behind Ole Kirk at odds of 20/1.

The horse was spelled after running unplaced in both the Caulfield Guineas and Cantala Stakes. He was retired from racing after unplaced runs in the Hobartville Stakes and Randwick Guineas.

== Stud career ==
In 2021 King's Legacy was added to the stallion roster of Coolmore Stud, where his initial service fee was set at A$33,000.

== Pedigree ==
Pedigree of King's Legacy (AUS) 2017
Sire Redoute's Choice (AUS) 1996	Danehill (USA); 1986	Danzig	Northern Dancer
Sire Redoute's Choice (AUS) 1996	Danehill (USA); 1986	Danzig	Pas De Nom
Sire Redoute's Choice (AUS) 1996	Danehill (USA); 1986	Razyana	His Majesty
Sire Redoute's Choice (AUS) 1996	Danehill (USA); 1986	Razyana	Spring Adieu
Sire Redoute's Choice (AUS) 1996	Shanthas Choice (AUS); 1992	Canny Lad	Bletchingly
Sire Redoute's Choice (AUS) 1996	Shanthas Choice (AUS); 1992	Canny Lad	Jesmond Lass
Sire Redoute's Choice (AUS) 1996	Shanthas Choice (AUS); 1992	Dancing Show	Nijinsky
Sire Redoute's Choice (AUS) 1996	Shanthas Choice (AUS); 1992	Dancing Show	Show Lady
Dam Breakfast In Bed (AUS) 2009	Hussonet (USA); 1991	Mr. Prospector	Raise a Native
Dam Breakfast In Bed (AUS) 2009	Hussonet (USA); 1991	Mr. Prospector	Gold Digger
Dam Breakfast In Bed (AUS) 2009	Hussonet (USA); 1991	Sacahuista	Raja Baba
Dam Breakfast In Bed (AUS) 2009	Hussonet (USA); 1991	Sacahuista	Nalees Flying Flag
Dam Breakfast In Bed (AUS) 2009	Bella Sunday (AUS); 2000	Sunday Silence	Halo
Dam Breakfast In Bed (AUS) 2009	Bella Sunday (AUS); 2000	Sunday Silence	Wishing Well
Dam Breakfast In Bed (AUS) 2009	Bella Sunday (AUS); 2000	Singles Bar	Rory's Jester
Dam Breakfast In Bed (AUS) 2009	Bella Sunday (AUS); 2000	Singles Bar	Easy Date
