= Manitoba (horse) =

British-bred Thoroughbred racehorse

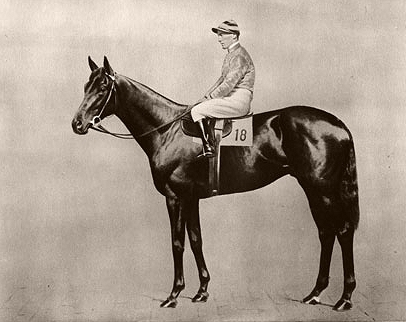
- Manna the sire of Manitoba.
- Sire: Manna (IRE)
- Grandsire: Phalaris
- Dam: Berystede
- Damsire: Son-in-Law
- Sex: Stallion
- Foaled: 1930
- Country: Great Britain
- Colour: Bay or brown
- Breeder: James Buchanan, 1st Baron Woolavington
- Owner: James Buchanan, 1st Baron Woolavington; Mr A. Robertson; Alexander Creswick; The Nook; Danmark Pty. Ltd.
- Trainer: Fred Darling; Lou Robertson
- Record: 21: 4-5-0
- Earnings: £4,082 (wins only)

Major wins
- Boscawen Stakes (1932); Coventry Stakes (1932)

Awards
- Leading sire in Australia (1944, 1945)
- Last updated on 22 August 2010

Manitoba (1930-1951) was a British bred Thoroughbred racehorse that was a race winner in England before he was exported to Australia where he was a leading sire.

== Breeding ==
He was bred and raced in England by Lord Woolavington, a Canadian-born owner of a highly successful London distillery who named the horse for the Canadian Province of Manitoba. Involved with racing for more than two decades, Lord Woolavington's horses twice won The Derby and St. Leger Stakes.

Manitoba was sired by Manna, winner of the 1925 2,000 Guineas Stakes and Epsom Derby and sire of Miracle (£14,607) and Colombo (£26,228). Manna was by the Leading sire in Great Britain and Ireland, Phalaris. His dam, Berystede, was a daughter of another two-time Leading sire, Son-in-Law, whom the National Horseracing Museum said was "probably the best and most distinguished stayer this country has ever known." Manitoba was from Bruce Lowe family, 8 which included Melton (winner of the Epsom Derby and St. Leger), Sunstream and Tide-way.

== Racing record ==
Manitoba met with modest success in racing when he won the Salisbury Foal Stakes (5 furs.), Newmarket Boscawen Stakes at Newmarket Racecourse (5 furs.), Ascot Coventry Stakes (5 furs.) at Ascot Racecourse and Birmingham Midland Breeders' Foal Plate (1¼ miles).

He had a total of 21 starts for 4 wins, 5 seconds for a wins only prize-money of £4,082.

== Stud record ==
Mr. Andrew Robertson purchased Manitoba to stand in Australia, where he commenced stud duties in 1935.

Manitoba sired 25 stakes-winners that had 54 stakes-wins including, Delina (VRC Sires Produce Stakes, Oakleigh Plate), Kelos (VRC Newmarket Handicap), Kiaree (AJC Epsom Handicap), Lincoln (Caulfield Cup), Modulation (AJC Epsom Handicap, George Main Stakes and St. Leger Stakes), Money Moon (Cantala Stakes), Phocion (NZ) (Williamstown Cup), Provoke (VRC Oaks), Sun Valley (VATC Toorak Handicap etc., sire), Tea Cake (Caulfield Guineas), Three Wheeler (VRC Newmarket Handicap, VRC Oaks), Zonda (winner of VATC Futurity Stakes, Oakleigh Plate), and many other winners.

Manitoba's daughter, Unity was the dam of Baystone (won Melbourne Cup etc.).

In 1944 and 1945 he was Australia's leading sire. During the 1949 stud season he stood at St Aubins Stud, Scone, New South Wales.

Manitoba was standing at Woodcroft Farm in Reynella, South Australia when he died at age twenty-one in 1951.
