= Leading sire in Australia =

The list below shows the leading sire of Thoroughbred racehorses in Australia for each season since 1883–84. This is determined by the amount of prize money won by the sire's progeny during the season.

The 2016 novel Mount! by Jilly Cooper describes the process to gain the fictional title for global leading sire.

== List ==
- 2025/26 – Snitzel (5)
- 2024/25 – Zoustar (1)
- 2023/24 – I Am Invincible (3)
- 2022/23 – I Am Invincible (2)
- 2021/22 – I Am Invincible (1)
- 2020/21 – Written Tycoon (1)
- 2019/20 – Snitzel (4)
- 2018/19 – Snitzel (3)
- 2017/18 – Snitzel (2)
- 2016/17 – Snitzel (1)
- 2015/16 – Street Cry (1)
- 2014/15 – Fastnet Rock (2)
- 2013/14 – Redoute's Choice (3)
- 2012/13 – Exceed and Excel (1)
- 2011/12 – Fastnet Rock (1)
- 2010/11 – Lonhro (1)
- 2009/10 – Redoute's Choice (2)
- 2008/09 – Encosta De Lago (2)
- 2007/08 – Encosta De Lago (1)
- 2006/07 – Flying Spur (1)
- 2005/06 – Redoute's Choice (1)
- 2004/05 – Danehill (9)
- 2003/04 – Danehill (8)
- 2002/03 – Danehill (7)
- 2001/02 – Danehill (6)
- 2000/01 – Danehill (5)
- 1999/2000 – Danehill (4)
- 1998/99 – Zabeel (2)
- 1997/98 – Zabeel (1)
- 1996/97 – Danehill (3)
- 1995/96 – Danehill (2)
- 1994/95 – Danehill (1)
- 1993/94 – Last Tycoon (1)
- 1992/93 – Marscay (2)
- 1991/92 – Nassipour (1)
- 1990/91 – Marscay (1)
- 1989/90 – Sir Tristram (6)
- 1988/89 – Sir Tristram (5)
- 1987/88 – Zamazaan (1)
- 1986/87 – Sir Tristram (4)
- 1985/86 – Sir Tristram (3)
- 1984/85 – Sir Tristram (2)
- 1983/84 – Vain (1)
- 1982/83 – Sir Tristram (1)
- 1981/82 – Bletchingly (3)
- 1980–81 – Bletchingly (2)
- 1979/80 – Bletchingly (1)
- 1978/79 – Century (1)
- 1977/78 – Showdown (2)
- 1976/77 – Better Boy (4)
- 1975/76 – Showdown (1)
- 1974/75 – Oncidium (2)
- 1973/74 – Matrice (1)
- 1972/73 – Oncidium (1)
- 1971/72 – Better Boy (3)
- 1970/71 – Better Boy (2)
- 1969/70 – Alcimedes (2)
- 1968/69 – Wilkes (1)
- 1967/68 – Agricola (1)
- 1966/67 – Alcimedes (1)
- 1965/66 – Better Boy (1)
- 1964/65 – Star Kingdom (5)
- 1963–64 – Wilkes (2)
- 1962/63 – Wilkes (1)
- 1961/62 – Star Kingdom (4)
- 1960/61 – Star Kingdom (3)
- 1959/60 – Star Kingdom (2)
- 1958/59 – Star Kingdom (1)
- 1957/58 – Khorassan (1)
- 1956/57 – Delville Wood (5)
- 1955/56 – Delville Wood (4)
- 1954/55 – Delville Wood (3)
- 1953/54 – Delville Wood (2)
- 1952/53 – Delville Wood (1)
- 1951/52 – Midstream (3)
- 1950/51 – Midstream (2)
- 1949/50 – The Buzzard (2)
- 1948/49 – Helios (1)
- 1947/48 – Midstream (1)
- 1946/47 – The Buzzard (1)
- 1945/46 – Emborough (1)
- 1944/45 – Manitoba (2)
- 1943/44 – Manitoba (1)
- 1942/43 – Spearfelt (1)
- 1941/42 – Beau Pere (3)
- 1940/41 – Beau Pere (2)
- 1939/40 – Beau Pere (1)
- 1938/39 – Heroic (7)
- 1937/38 – Heroic (6)
- 1936/37 – Heroic (5)
- 1935/36 – Heroic (4)
- 1934/35 – Heroic (3)
- 1933/34 – Heroic (2)
- 1932/33 – Heroic (1)
- 1931/32 – Limond (1)
- 1930/31 – Night Raid (2)
- 1929/30 – Night Raid (1)
- 1928/29 – Magpie (1)
- 1927-28 – Valais (5)
- 1926/27 – Valais (4)
- 1925/26 – Valais (3)
- 1924/25 – Valais (2)
- 1923/24 – Valais (1)
- 1922/23 – Comedy King (2)
- 1921/22 – The Welkin (3)
- 1920/21 – The Welkin (2)
- 1919/20 – Comedy King (1)
- 1918/19 – The Welkin (1)
- 1917/18 – Linacre (2)
- 1916/17 – Linacre (1)
- 1915/16 – Wallace (1)
- 1914/15 – Maltster (5)
- 1913/14 – Maltster (4)
- 1912/13 – Ayr Laddie (1)
- 1911/12 – Maltster (3)
- 1910/11 – Maltster (2)
- 1909/10 – Maltster (1)
- 1908/09 – Grafton (4)
- 1907/08 – Grafton (3)
- 1906/07 – Grafton (2)
- 1905/06 – Lochiel (5)
- 1904/05 – Lochiel (4)
- 1903/04 – Grafton (1)
- 1902/03 – Pilgrim's Progress (1)
- 1901–/02 – Trenton (2)
- 1900/01 – Lochiel (3)
- 1899/1900 – Lochiel (2)
- 1898/99 – Gozo (1)
- 1897/98 – Lochiel (1)
- 1896/97 – Newminster (2)
- 1895/96 – Trenton (1)
- 1894/95 – Grand Flaneur (1)
- 1893/94 – Newminster (1)
- 1892/93 – Chester (4)
- 1891/92 – Chester (3)
- 1890/91 – Musket (3)
- 1889/90 – Chester (2)
- 1888/89 – Musket (2)
- 1887/88 – Chester (1)
- 1886/87 – Robinson Crusoe (1)
- 1885/86 – Musket (1)
- 1884/85 – St Albans (2)
- 1883/84 – St Albans (1)

== See also ==
- Leading sire in France
- Leading sire in Germany
- Leading sire in Great Britain and Ireland
- Leading sire in Japan
- Leading broodmare sire in Japan
- Leading sire in North America
- Leading broodmare sire in Great Britain & Ireland
- Leading broodmare sire in North America
