= Written Tycoon =

Australian thoroughbred racehorse

- Sire: Iglesia
- Grandsire: Last Tycoon
- Dam: Party Miss
- Damsire: Kenmare
- Sex: Colt
- Foaled: 6 September 2002
- Country: Australia
- Colour: Chestnut
- Breeder: Daandine Pastoral Co Pty Ltd
- Owner: Iskander Racing et al.
- Trainer: Grahame Begg (2005); John O'Shea (2006-2007)
- Record: 11: 2-3-0
- Earnings: A$289,325

Major wins
- Todman Stakes (2005)

Awards
- Australian Champion Sire (2020/21)

Written Tycoon (foaled 6 September 2002) is a stakes winning Australian Thoroughbred racehorse and successful sire who has sired multiple Group 1 winners.

== Racing career ==
Written Tycoon commenced his race career with an easy win at Randwick as a pronounced 7/4 favourite.

Two weeks later, he was narrowly beaten by filly Fashions Afield at Randwick. Fashions Afield would later frank the form in claiming the Sires' Produce Stakes and Reisling Stakes.

Written Tycoon then recorded his only other career victory when winning the Todman Stakes at Rosehill.

Written Tycoon was retired as a four-year old after finishing unplaced in the Challenge Stakes.

== Stud career ==
Written Tycoon initially stood at Eliza Park Stud in Victoria, Australia for a service fee of A$6,600. In 2013 he was relocated to Woodside Park Stud for a fee of $13,750. By 2018 his service fee had increased to $110,000. In 2020 it was announced that Written Tycoon would be relocated to Arrowfield Stud in New South Wales.

=== Notable progeny ===
Written Tycoon's Group 1 winners:

'c = colt, f = filly, g = gelding

Foaled	Name	Sex	Major wins
2010	Tycoon Tara	f	Tattersall's Tiara
2011	Music Magnate	g	Doomben 10,000
2013	Capitalist	c	Golden Slipper Stakes
2013	Luna Rossa	f	Manawatu Sires Produce Stakes
2013	Tyzone	g	Stradbroke Handicap
2014	Booker	f	Oakleigh Plate
2014	Despatch	g	The Goodwood
2015	Pippie	f	Oakleigh Plate, A J Moir Stakes
2015	Written By	c	Blue Diamond Stakes
2017	Odeum	f	The Thousand Guineas
2017	Ole Kirk	c	Golden Rose Stakes, Caulfield Guineas
2019	Coolangatta	f	A J Moir Stakes, Black Caviar Lightning
2020	Southport Tycoon	c	Australian Guineas
2021	Captured By Love	f	New Zealand 1000 Guineas
2021	Lady of Camelot	f	Golden Slipper
2021	Private Life	c	Caulfield Guineas
2021	Velocious	f	Sistema Stakes
2022	Skyhook	c	Golden Eagle
2022	Well Written	f	New Zealand 1000 Guineas, Proisir Plate

== Pedigree ==
Pedigree of Written Tycoon (AUS) 2002
Sire Iglesia (AUS) 1995	Last Tycoon (IRE); 1983	Try My Best (USA); 1975	Northern Dancer (CAN); 1961
Sire Iglesia (AUS) 1995	Last Tycoon (IRE); 1983	Try My Best (USA); 1975	Sex Appeal (USA); 1970
Sire Iglesia (AUS) 1995	Last Tycoon (IRE); 1983	Mill Princess (IRE); 1977	Mill Reef (USA); 1978
Sire Iglesia (AUS) 1995	Last Tycoon (IRE); 1983	Mill Princess (IRE); 1977	Irish Lass (IRE); 1962
Sire Iglesia (AUS) 1995	Yodells (AUS); 1988	Marscay (AUS); 1979	Biscay (AUS); 1965
Sire Iglesia (AUS) 1995	Yodells (AUS); 1988	Marscay (AUS); 1979	Heart of Market (USA); 1967
Sire Iglesia (AUS) 1995	Yodells (AUS); 1988	Yodelling Lady (AUS); 1979	Paris Review (USA); 1972
Sire Iglesia (AUS) 1995	Yodells (AUS); 1988	Yodelling Lady (AUS); 1979	Alpine Pass (AUS); 1970
Dam Party Miss (AUS) 1991	Kenmare (AUS); 1975	Kalamoun (GB); 1970	Zeddaan (GB); 1965
Dam Party Miss (AUS) 1991	Kenmare (AUS); 1975	Kalamoun (GB); 1970	Khairunissa (GB); 1960
Dam Party Miss (AUS) 1991	Kenmare (AUS); 1975	Belle of Ireland (GB); 1964	Milesian (IRE); 1953
Dam Party Miss (AUS) 1991	Kenmare (AUS); 1975	Belle of Ireland (GB); 1964	Belle of the Ball (GB); 1958
Dam Party Miss (AUS) 1991	Miss Entertainer (AUS); 1975	Vain (AUS); 1966	Wilkes (FR); 1952
Dam Party Miss (AUS) 1991	Miss Entertainer (AUS); 1975	Vain (AUS); 1966	Elated (AUS); 1957
Dam Party Miss (AUS) 1991	Miss Entertainer (AUS); 1975	Viveza (AUS); 1967	Better Boy (IRE); 1951
Dam Party Miss (AUS) 1991	Miss Entertainer (AUS); 1975	Viveza (AUS); 1967	Emerald Fire (NZ); 1961
