= Champagne Stakes =

Champagne Stakes may refer to:

- Champagne Stakes (ATC), a horse race at Randwick Racecourse in Sydney, Australia
- Champagne Stakes (MVRC), a horse race at Moonee Valley Racecourse in Melbourne, Australia
- Champagne Stakes (Great Britain), a horse race at Doncaster Racecourse in Great Britain
- Champagne Stakes (United States), a horse race at Belmont Park in New York
