= Daryl's Joy =

New Zealand Thoroughbred racehorse

Daryl’s Joy (NZ)
- Sire: Stunning (GB)
- Grandsire: Stardust (GB)
- Dam: Rutha (NZ)
- Damsire: Ruthless (GB)
- Sex: Stallion
- Foaled: 1966
- Died: 1987
- Country: New Zealand
- Colour: Brown
- Trainer: Syd Brown (New Zealand), Charlie Whittingham (USA)
- Record: 30: 16-9-4
- Earnings: A$72,930, US$192,775, NZ$21,610

Major wins
- Manawatu Sires Produce Stakes (1969); W. S. Cox Plate (1969); Victoria Derby (1969); Moonee Valley Stakes (1969); Del Mar Handicap (1970); Arcadia Handicap (1971); San Luis Obispo Handicap (1971)

Honours
- Grade III Daryl's Joy Stakes (1985–1995)
- Last updated on 11 August 2020

Daryl’s Joy was a notable New Zealand Thoroughbred race horse.

A son of Stunning (GB) from the mare Rutha (NZ), he was foaled in 1966 and was trained by Syd Brown in New Zealand and later in his career by Charlie Whittingham in the United States.

== Racing record ==
A bargain buy costing only $1,100 at the New Zealand yearling sales, he went on to win races in three different countries.

Daryl’s Joy was New Zealand’s top rated juvenile in 1968-69 winning seven races and placing seven times in 14 starts.

The following season as a three-year-old he raced exclusively in Australia.

At his first start in Australia he finished third behind the champion sprinter Vain in the Ascot Vale Stakes before turning the tables in the Moonee Valley Stakes. Vain exacted revenge in the Caulfield Guineas but Daryl’s Joy excelled a longer distances and scored hollow wins in the Cox Plate and the Victoria Derby.

Immediately following the 1969 spring carnival, Daryl’s Joy was exported to the United States.

Trained by Charlie Whittingham he won four Group races at Del Mar and Santa Anita racetracks. His record in the United States was 11 starts for 6 wins, three seconds and one third.

== Stud record ==
Following retirement, he stood at stud in Florida with moderate success only siring two stakes winners.

Daryl’s Joy died in 1987.

== See also ==
- Thoroughbred racing in Australia
- Thoroughbred racing in New Zealand
