= Bill Stutt Stakes =

- Class: Group 2
- Location: Moonee Valley Racecourse, Melbourne, Australia
- Inaugurated: 1934
- Race type: Thoroughbred
- Sponsor: Carbone Lawyers (2026)

Race information
- Distance: 1,600 metres
- Surface: Turf
- Track: Left-handed
- Qualification: Three year old
- Weight: Set weights Colts and geldings 57 kg, Fillies 55 kg
- Purse: $300,000 (2026)

The Bill Stutt Stakes is a Moonee Valley Racing Club Group 2 Thoroughbred horse race for horses aged three years old, under open set weight conditions, over a distance of 1600 metres, held annually at Moonee Valley Racecourse, Melbourne, Australia.

== History ==
The race was renamed in honour of Bill Stutt, a former chairman of the Moonee Valley Racing Club.

=== 1944 racebook ===
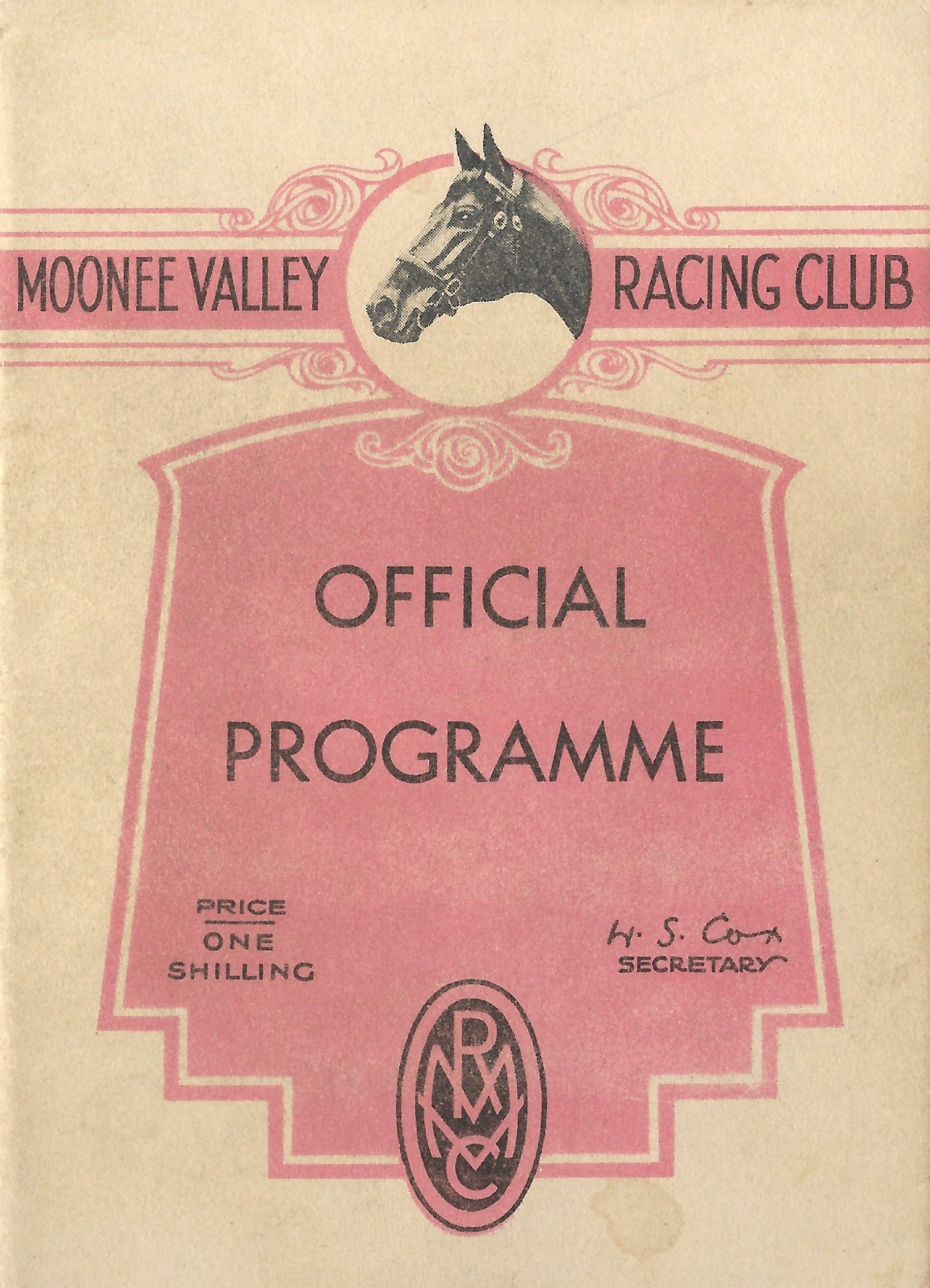
1944 MVRC Moonee Valley Stakes racebook front cover

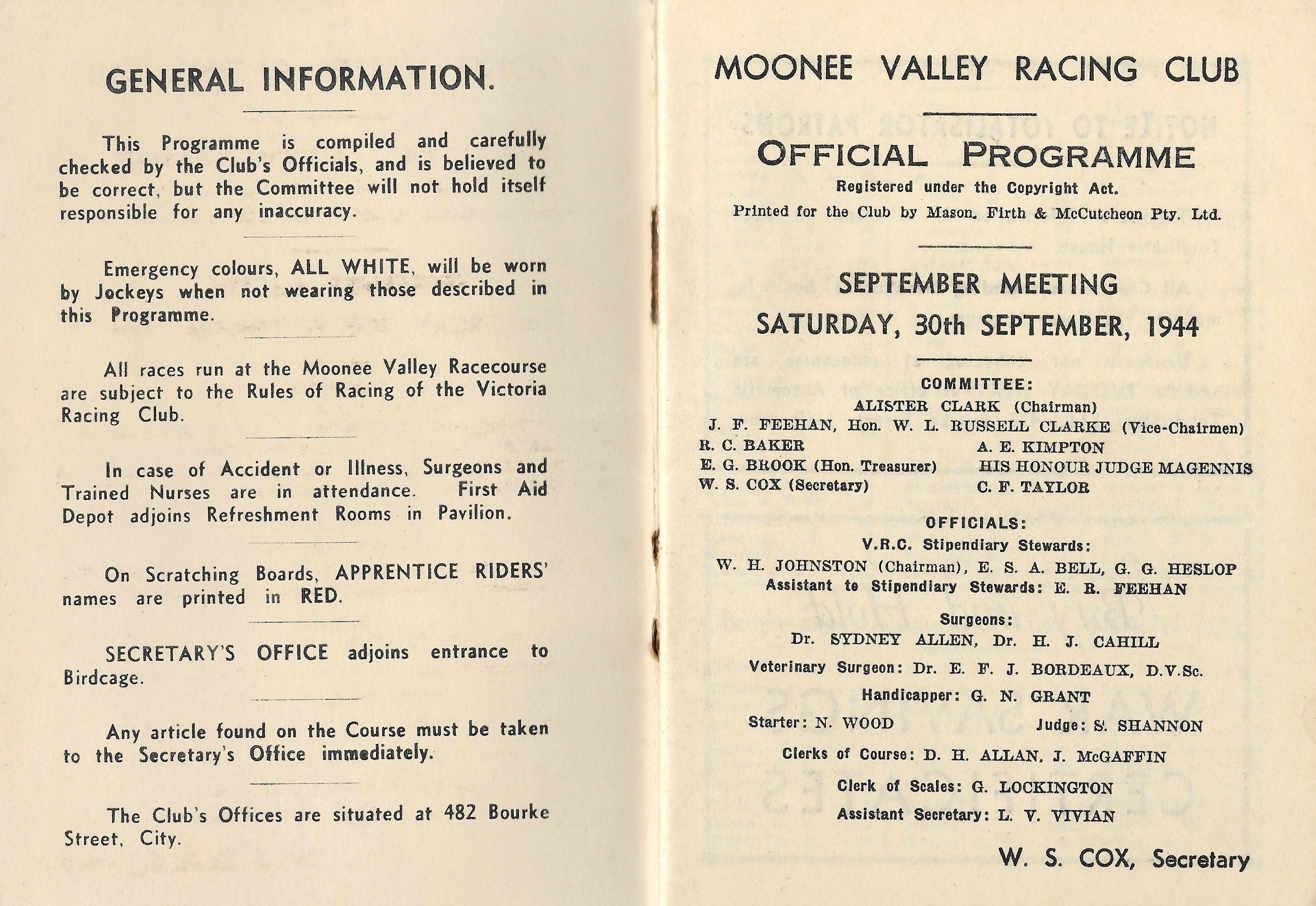
1944 MVRC Moonee Valley Stakes raceday officials

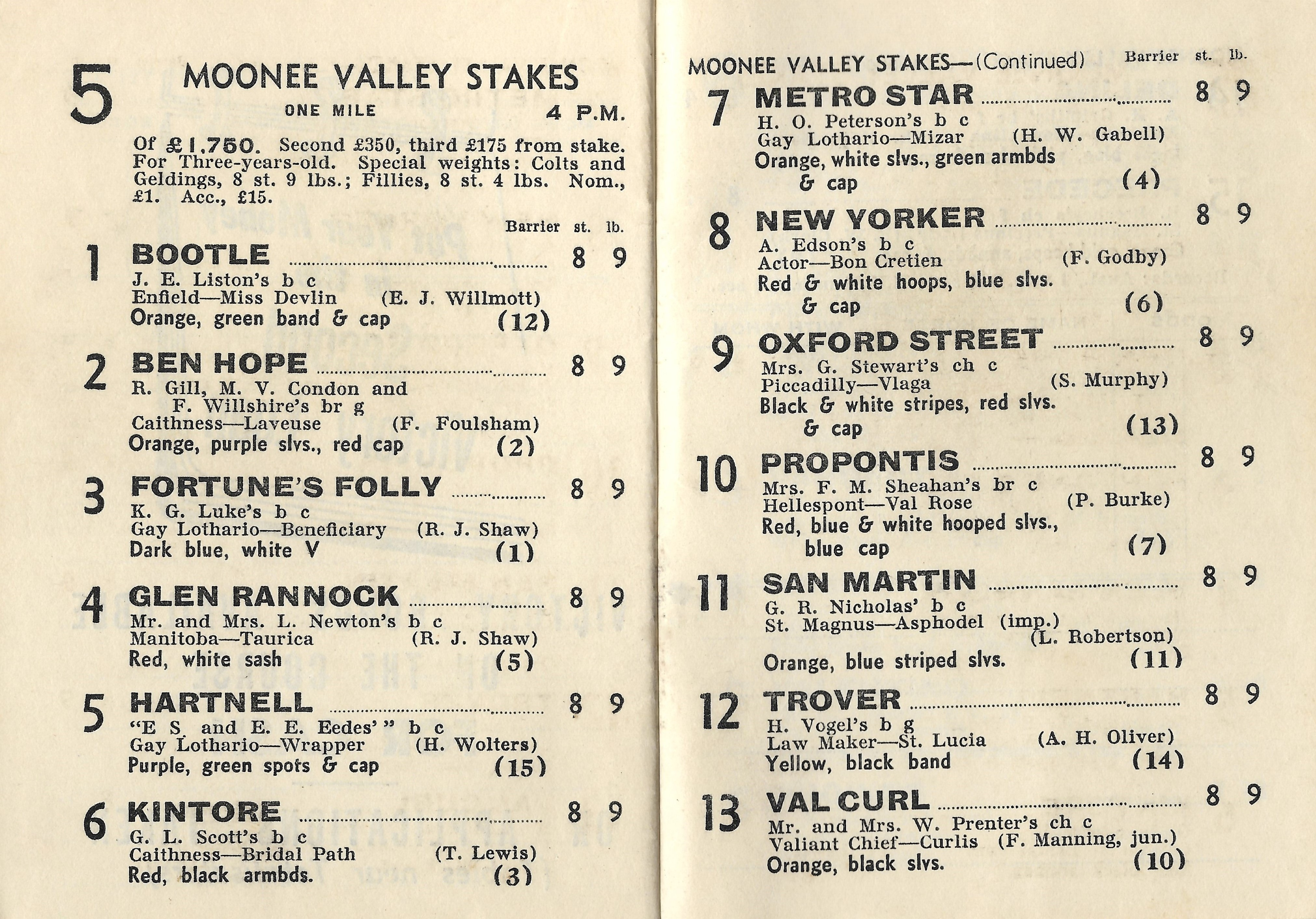
1944 MVRC Moonee Valley Stakes starters and results showing the winner, Bootle

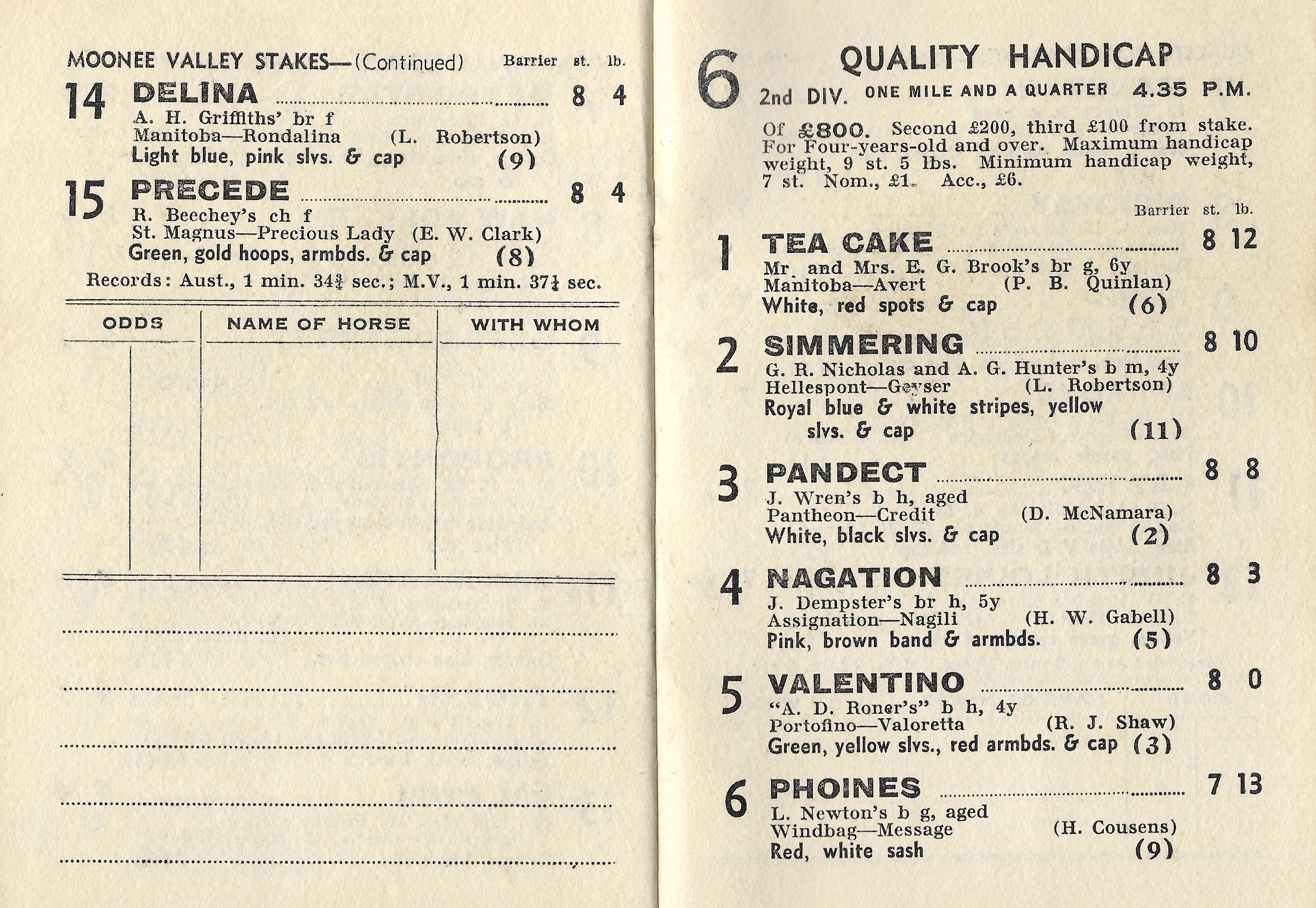
1944 MVRC Moonee Valley Stakes starters and results

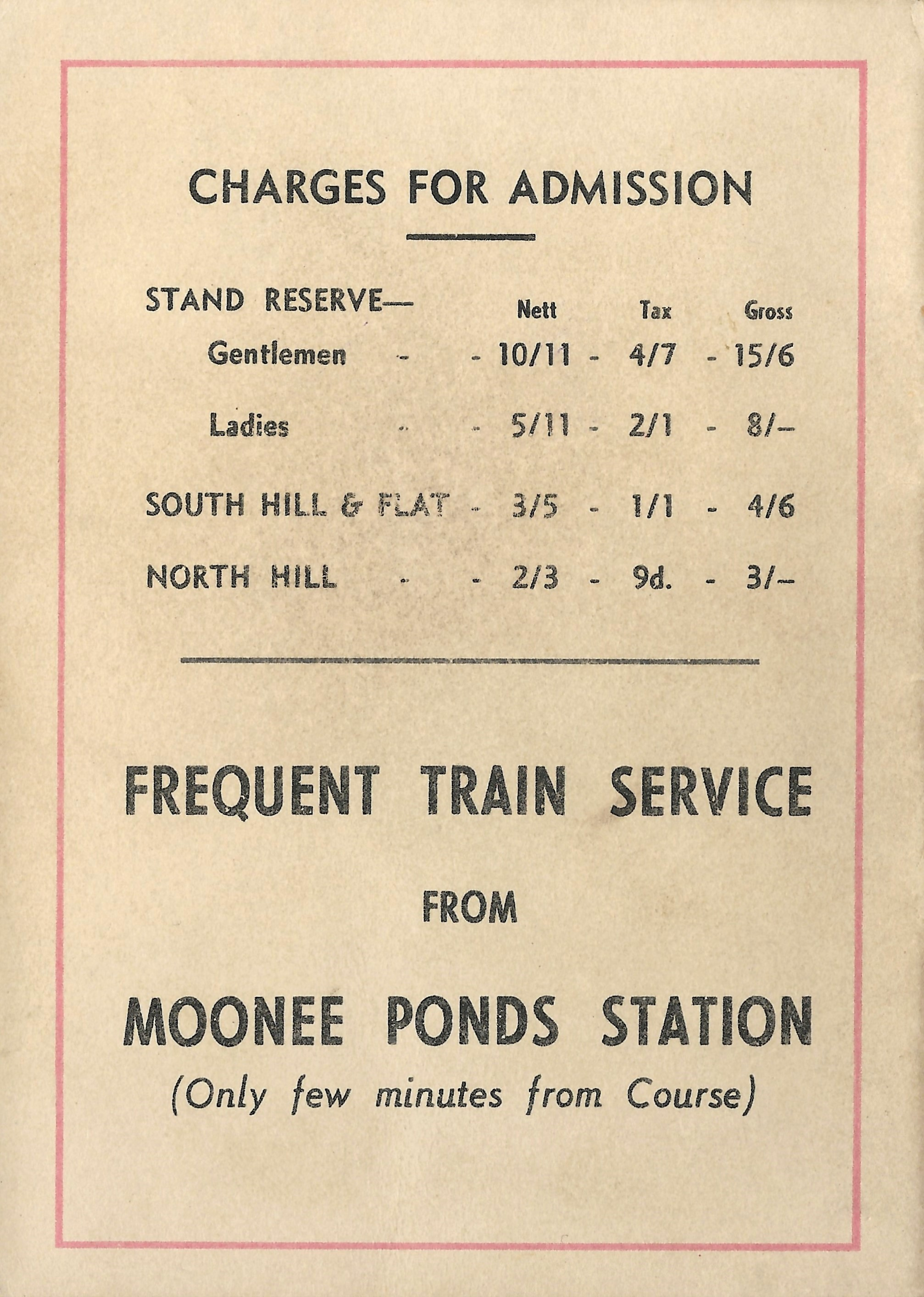
Back cover showing admission charges & train services

=== Distance ===
- 1934–1971 - 1 mile (approx. 1600m)
- 1972 onwards - 1600 metres with exceptions
- 1986, 1990, 1993 - 1614 metres
- 1989 - 1619 metres

=== Grade ===
- 1934–1978 was a Principal Race
- 1979 onwards Group 2

=== Name ===
- 1934–1989 - Moonee Valley Stakes
- 1990 onwards - Bill Stutt Stakes

== Winners ==
The following are past winners of the race.

- 2026 - Diameter
- 2025 - West Of Swindon
- 2024 - Evaporate
- 2023 - Griff
- 2022 - Tijuana
- 2021 - Forgot You
- 2020 - Glenfiddich
- 2019 - The Holy One
- 2018 - Leonardo Da Hinchi
- 2017 - Showtime
- 2016 - Hey Doc
- 2015 - Sovereign Nation
- 2014 - Almalad
- 2013 - Divine Calling
- 2012 - Pierro
- 2011 - Chase The Rainbow
- 2010 - Hollowlea
- 2009 - Carrara
- 2008 - Whobegotyou
- 2007 - Barbaricus
- 2006 - Churchill Downs
- 2005 - Red Dazzler
- 2004 - Mr. Martini
- 2003 - Casual Pass
- 2002 - Helenus
- 2001 - Viscount
- 2000 - Sarason Trail
- 1999 - Diatribe
- 1998 - †Helm / St. Clemens Belle
- 1997 - Schubert
- 1996 - Encosta De Lago
- 1995 - Burrito
- 1994 - Blevic
- 1993 - Pearl Prince
- 1992 - Bundy Lad
- 1991 - Ready To Explode
- 1990 - Canny Lad
- 1989 - Zabeel
- 1988 - Almurtajaz
- 1987 - Sky Chase
- 1986 - Broad Reach
- 1985 - Wellington Hammer
- 1984 - Red Anchor
- 1983 - Albany Bay
- 1982 - Holsam
- 1981 - Fearless Pride
- 1980 - Glenson
- 1979 - Rumour-Qui
- 1978 - Karaman
- 1977 - Guns Away
- 1976 - Surround
- 1975 - Denise’s Joy
- 1974 - Plush
- 1973 - Taj Rossi
- 1972 - Century
- 1971 - Beau Sovereign
- 1970 - Eastern Court
- 1969 - Daryl's Joy
- 1968 - Always There
- 1967 - Fileur
- 1966 - Storm Queen
- 1965 - Star Affair
- 1964 - L’Orage Boy
- 1963 - Proteus
- 1962 - Fuel
- 1961 - New Statesman
- 1960 - Lady Sybil
- 1959 - Mardene
- 1958 - San Remo
- 1957 - Gay Saba
- 1956 - Arab’s Choice
- 1955 - French Charm
- 1954 - Spritsail
- 1953 - Walu
- 1952 - Lenity
- 1951 - Friar’s Hope
- 1950 - Beau Avion
- 1949 - St. Comedy
- 1948 - Phoibos
- 1947 - Chanak
- 1946 - Bold Beau
- 1945 - Attley
- 1944 - Bootle
- 1943 - Precept
- 1942 - Leahero
- 1941 - Skipton
- 1940 - Sun Valley
- 1939 - Pure Gold
- 1938 - Cassio
- 1937 - Lochlee
- 1936 - Silver Reign
- 1935 - Valiant Chief
- 1934 - Titanium

† Dead heat

== See also ==
- John F. Feehan Stakes
- JRA Cup
- Manikato Stakes
- Scarborough Stakes
- W H Stocks Stakes
- List of Australian Group races
- Group races
