= B J McLachlan Stakes =

Horse race in Brisbane, Queensland, Australia

- Class: Group 3
- Location: Doomben Racecourse; Brisbane, Australia
- Inaugurated: 1982 (as the O'Brien Glass Plate)
- Race type: Thoroughbred - Flat racing
- Sponsor: Magic Millions (2017-25)

Race information
- Distance: 1,200 metres
- Surface: Turf
- Track: Right-handed
- Qualification: Two year old
- Weight: Set Weights colts and geldings – 57 kg fillies – 55 kg
- Purse: A$300,000 (2025)

B J McLachlan Stakes is a registered Brisbane Racing Club Group 3 Thoroughbred horse race for two-year-olds run at set weights over a distance of 1200 metres at Doomben Racecourse, Brisbane, Australia in late December.

== History ==
The race is named in honour of former horse trainer Bruce McLachlan. McLachlan won 16 Brisbane Metropolitan Training Premierships, and trained over 3000 winners in a forty-year training career.

=== Name ===
- 1982–1986 - O'Brien Glass Plate
- 1987–1993 - Chinatown Stakes
- 1994–1997 - BATC Stakes
- 1998–2008 - Tommy Smith Slipper
- 2009 onwards - B J McLachlan Stakes

=== Grade ===
- 1982–2010 - Listed Race
- 2011 onwards - Group 3

=== Venue ===
- 1982–2013 - Doomben Racecourse
- 2014–2015 - Gold Coast Racecourse (due to renovations at Eagle Farm the BRC has moved the event)
- 2016 - Eagle Farm Racecourse
- 2017–2018 - Doomben Racecourse
- 2019 - Eagle Farm Racecourse

== Winners ==
Past winers of the race are as follows.

- 2025 - Zip Lock
- 2024 - Icarian Dream
- 2023 - Storm Boy
- 2022 - The Novelist
- 2021 - Coolangatta
- 2020 - Alpine Edge
- 2019 - King's Legacy
- 2018 - Sun City
- 2017 - Meryl
- 2016 - Ours To Keep
- 2015 - Zelady's Night Out
- 2014 - Mishani Honcho
- 2013 - Unencumbered
- 2012 - Missy Longstocking
- 2011 - Driefontein
- 2010 - Military Grace
- 2009 - Military Rose
- 2008 (Dec.) - Paprika
- 2008 †(Mar.) - She's Meaner
- 2006 - Miss Watagan
- 2005 - Master Archie
- 2004 - Snitzel
- 2003 - Oratorio
- 2002 - How Funny
- 2001 - Sunday Joy
- 2000 - Shovoff
- 1999 - race not held
- 1998 - Territorial
- 1997 - Mr. Innocent
- 1996 - Guineas
- 1995 - Sovereign State
- 1994 - Pottinger
- 1994 - Brave Warrior
- 1992 - Gem Of The West
- 1991 - Facile
- 1990 - Unbid Slam
- 1989 - St. Jude
- 1988 - Scomasc
- 1988 - Prince Regent
- 1987 - Wear The Crown
- 1985 - Roro
- 1984 - Lady Lustre
- 1983 - Crawford
- 1982 - Spanian

† Race rescheduled due to equine influenza.

== See also ==
- List of Australian Group races
- Group races
