= W H Stocks Stakes =

- Class: Group 2
- Location: Moonee Valley Racecourse, Melbourne, Australia
- Inaugurated: 1973
- Race type: Thoroughbred
- Sponsor: Ladbrokes (2021-2026)

Race information
- Distance: 1,500 metres
- Surface: Turf
- Track: Left-handed
- Qualification: Mares, four years old and over
- Weight: Weight for Age
- Purse: $300,000 (2026)

The W H Stocks Stakes is a Moonee Valley Racing Club Group 2 Thoroughbred horse race for mares aged four years old and over, held under weight for age conditions, over a distance of 1500 metres held annually in September at Moonee Valley Racecourse, Melbourne, Australia.

== History ==
=== Distance ===
- 1973–1992 - 1600 metres
- 1993 - 1616 metres
- 1994–2023, 2026 - 1600 metres
- 2024 - 1514 metres
- 2025 - 1500 metres

=== Grade ===
- 1973–1978 - Principal Race
- 1979–1992 - Listed Race
- 1993–2004 - Group 3
- 2005 onwards - Group 2

=== Name ===
- 1973–1979 - Dallas Handicap
- 1980–2006 - W H Stocks Stakes
- 2007 - Cranes Stakes
- 2008 onwards - W H Stocks Stakes

== Winners ==
The following are past winners of the race.

- 2025 - Splash Back
- 2024 - Alsephina
- 2023 - Amelia's Jewel
- 2022 - Daisies
- 2021 - So You Assume
- 2020 - Mystic Journey
- 2019 - Princess Jenni
- 2018 - I Am A Star
- 2017 - I Am A Star
- 2016 - Don't Doubt Mamma
- 2015 - Fenway
- 2014 - Dear Demi
- 2013 - Atlantic Jewel
- 2012 - Oasis Bloom
- 2011 - King's Rose
- 2010 - Avienus
- 2009 - Zarita
- 2008 - Tuesday Joy
- 2007 - Devil Moon
- 2006 - Astrodame
- 2005 - Flowerdrum
- 2004 - She’s Archie
- 2003 - Sunday Joy
- 2002 - Gold Lottey
- 2001 - Lady Marion
- 2000 - Hula Wonder
- 1999 - Sorrento
- 1998 - Londolozi
- 1997 - Sweet Delight
- 1996 - Arctic Scent
- 1995 - The Penny
- 1994 - Alcove
- 1993 - Bon Precieux
- 1992 - Gatherneaux
- 1991 - Pacific
- 1990 - Natural Wonder
- 1989 - Top Dance
- 1988 - Hazy Pond
- 1987 - Gielgud’s Belle
- 1986 - Rompalong
- 1985 - Digger’s Lass
- 1984 - Change The Tune
- 1983 - Matternot
- 1982 - Fiery Pax
- 1981 - Countess Caboul
- 1980 - Dondal
- 1979 - Country Belle
- 1978 - Bold Bridget
- 1977 - race not held
- 1976 - Princess Veronica
- 1975 - Hot Cross
- 1974 - Dowling Lass
- 1973 - Mellition

== See also ==
- John F. Feehan Stakes
- JRA Cup
- Manikato Stakes
- Scarborough Stakes
- Bill Stutt Stakes
- List of Australian Group races
- Group races
