= Courtza Stakes =

- Class: Group 3
- Location: Caulfield Racecourse, Melbourne, Australia
- Inaugurated: 1992
- Race type: Thoroughbred
- Sponsor: HKJC World Pool (2026)

Race information
- Distance: 1,200 metres
- Surface: Turf
- Qualification: Mares – four years old and older that are not maidens
- Weight: Set weights with penalties
- Purse: $200,000 (2026)

The Courtza Stakes is a Melbourne Racing Club Group 3 Thoroughbred horse race for mares four years old and older, run at set weights with penalties, over a distance of 1200 metres at Caulfield Racecourse, Melbourne, Australia.

== History ==
=== Name ===
Up to 2025 the race was known as the Cockram Stakes named in honour of prominent Victorian breeder W.W. (Wally) Cockram, who served as Vice Chairman of the Victorian Amateur Turf Club and Melbourne Racing Club from 1970 to 1984.

=== Venue ===
- 1992–1993 - held at Sandown Park Racecourse
- 1994 - Caulfield Racecourse
- 1995–1996 - held at Sandown Park Racecourse
- 1997 - Caulfield Racecourse
- 1998–2001 - held at Sandown Park Racecourse
- 2002 onwards - Caulfield Racecourse

=== Name ===
- 2002 - Sir Edward Dunlop Research Foundation Stakes
- 2014 - Sportingbet Sprint Series Heat 1 Stakes
- 2015 - William Hill Sprint Series Heat 1 Stakes
- 2026 onwards - Courtza Stakes

== Winners ==
Winners of the race are as follows.

- 2026 - Custom
- 2025 - Magic Time
- 2024 - Quintessa
- 2023 - Benedetta
- 2022 - Chain Of Lightning
- 2021 - Probabeel
- 2020 - Perfect Jewel
- 2019 - Pippie
- 2018 - Ellicazoom
- 2017 - Savanna Amour
- 2016 - Ocean Embers
- 2015 - Madam Gangster
- 2014 - Gregers
- 2013 - Octavia
- 2012 - Lady Melksham
- 2011 - Mid Summer Music
- 2010 - Rhythm In Paris
- 2009 - Cats Whisker
- 2008 - Princess Gisella
- 2007 - Storm Signal
- 2006 - Storm Alert
- 2005 - Dea
- 2004 - Strikeline
- 2003 - Brief Embrace
- 2002 - Pernod
- 2001 - Libidinious
- 2000 - Tickle My
- 1999 - Chillies
- 1998 - Spectrum
- 1997 - Tonicity
- 1996 - Street Talk
- 1995 - Petite Amour
- 1994 - Timeless Grace
- 1993 - Party Dancer
- 1992 - Pride Of Demus

== See also ==
- Memsie Stakes
- The Heath 1100
- HDF McNeil Stakes
- List of Australian Group races
- Group races
