= Kevin Hayes Stakes =

Kevin Hayes Stakes registered as the Boronia Stakes
- Class: Group 3
- Location: Caulfield Racecourse, Sandown Racecourse
- Inaugurated: 1984 (as Catanach's Handicap)
- Race type: Thoroughbred
- Sponsor: Evergreen Turf (2026)

Race information
- Distance: 1,100 metres (previously 1,200 metres)
- Surface: Turf
- Track: Left-handed
- Qualification: Three year old fillies
- Weight: Set weights with penalties
- Purse: $200,000 (2026)

The Kevin Hayes Stakes, registered as the Boronia Stakes, is a Melbourne Racing Club Group 3 Thoroughbred horse race, for three-year-old fillies, at set weights with penalties, over a distance of 1200 metres. It is held annually at Caulfield Racecourse in Melbourne, Australia in February.

== History ==
The race was named after the former Chairman of the Victoria Amateur Turf Club, Kevin Hayes.

=== Name ===
- 1984–1985 - Catanach's Handicap
- 1986–1988 - Jewel Handicap
- 1989 - Jewel Stakes
- 1990–1996 - Laurent Perrier Stakes
- 1997 - Inglis Prem Yearling Stakes
- 1998 - Swamp King Sand Park Stakes
- 1999–2002 - Sandown Park (UK) Stakes
- 2003 - Sandown Park (UK) Handicap
- 2004–2024 - Kevin Hayes Stakes
- 2025 onwards - Peter Le Grand Stakes

=== Distance ===
- 1984–1988 – 1400 metres
- 1989–1997 – 1200 metres
- 1998–1999 – 1100 metres
- 2000–2022 - 1200 metres
- 2023 onwards - 1100 metres

=== Grade ===
- 1984–2013 - Listed race
- 2014 onward - Group 3

=== Venue ===
- 2006 - Sandown Racecourse
- 2023 - Sandown Racecourse

== Winners ==
Past winners of the race are as follows.

- 2026 - Alpha Sofie
- 2025 - Arabian Summer
- 2024 - Estriella
- 2023 - Rich Fortune
- 2022 – Argentia
- 2021 – La Mexicana
- 2020 – How Womantic
- 2019 – Crack The Code
- 2018 – Booker
- 2017 – Fuhryk
- 2016 - Risque
- 2015 - Sabatini
- 2014 - Spirits Dance
- 2013 - Octavia
- 2012 - Soft Sand
- 2011 - Miss Gai Flyer
- 2010 - Set For Fame
- 2009 - Typhoon Tracy
- 2008 - Absolut Glam
- 2007 - Gina Lollawitcha
- 2006 - Chetwynd South
- 2005 - Hollow Bullet
- 2004 - French Bid
- 2003 - Brief Embrace
- 2002 - Fair Embrace
- 2001 - Queen Carey
- 2000 - Heaps Of Fun
- 1999 - Rainbow Bubbles
- 1998 - Drop Anchor
- 1997 - Chalee
- 1996 - Rubidium
- 1995 - Eccentricity
- 1994 - Adagietto
- 1993 - Crazy Neaux
- 1992 - Rockabye
- 1991 - Mahaasin
- 1990 - Sister Canny
- 1989 - Gilded Lily
- 1988 - Golden Unicorn
- 1987 - Fashion Fun
- 1986 - Nancress
- 1985 - Winged Keel
- 1984 - Fork Tongue

== See also ==
- List of Australian Group races
- Group races
