= JRA Cup =

- Class: Group 3
- Location: Moonee Valley Racecourse, Melbourne, Australia
- Inaugurated: 1993
- Race type: Thoroughbred
- Sponsor: Schweppes (2025)

Race information
- Distance: 2,040 metres
- Surface: Turf
- Track: Left-handed
- Weight: Quality handicap
- Purse: $200,000 (2026)

The JRA Cup (Japan Racing Association) is a Moonee Valley Racing Club Group 3 Thoroughbred quality handicap horse race, over a distance of 2040 metres, held annually at Moonee Valley Racecourse, Melbourne, Australia in September or October.

== History ==
As an unlisted race until 1995, the race was known as the Geoff Madden Handicap.

=== Grade ===
- Prior 1996 - Unlisted Race
- 1996–2009 - Listed Race
- 2010 onwards - Group 3

== Winners ==
The following are past winners of the race.

- 2026 - Royal Supremecy
- 2025 - Star Of India
- 2024 - Future History
- 2023 - Ain’tnodeeldun
- 2022 - Desert Icon
- 2021 - Secret Blaze
- 2020 - Al Galayel
- 2019 - Captain Cook
- 2018 - The Taj Mahal
- 2017 - Jon Snow
- 2016 - Real Love
- 2015 - Escado
- 2014 - The Cleaner
- 2013 - Mourinho
- 2012 - Bianmick
- 2011 - Dream Pedlar
- 2010 - Precedence
- 2009 - Alcopop
- 2008 - Cefalu
- 2007 - Maldivian
- 2006 - Pavlova
- 2005 - El Segundo
- 2004 - Beswinging
- 2003 - General Booth
- 2002 - Cheverny
- 2001 - Rain Gauge
- 2000 - Prince Benbara
- 1999 - Brave Chief
- 1998 - Il Don
- 1997 - Sunny Lane
- 1996 - Section

== See also ==
- John F. Feehan Stakes
- Manikato Stakes
- Scarborough Stakes
- W H Stocks Stakes
- Bill Stutt Stakes
- List of Australian Group races
- Group races
