= Limond =

Limond is a Scottish surname. Notable people by that name include:

- Brian Limond, known as "Limmy", (born 1974), Scottish comedian
- David Limond (1831–1895), British soldier of the Royal Engineers (Bengal)
- Willie Limond (1979–2024), Scottish boxer
- Charles Limond, known as “Chas”, (born 1970), British soldier of the Royal Military Police, Detective of Strathclyde Police
