= Champagne Stakes (MVRC) =

Horse race in Melbourne, Australia

Scarborough Stakes registered as Champagne Stakes
- Class: Group 3
- Location: Moonee Valley Racecourse, Melbourne, Australia
- Inaugurated: 1975
- Race type: Dominant (2025 & 2026)

Race information
- Distance: 1,200 metres
- Surface: Turf
- Track: Left-handed
- Qualification: Three year old fillies
- Weight: Set weights
- Purse: $200,000 (2026)

The Scarborough Stakes, registered as the Champagne Stakes, is a Moonee Valley Racing Club Group 3 Thoroughbred horse race for three-year-old fillies, under set weight conditions, over a distance of 1200 metres, held annually at Moonee Valley Racecourse, Melbourne, Australia, in September.

== History ==
=== Distance ===
- 1975 onwards - 1200 metres with exceptions
- 1987–1988 – 1212 metres
- 1994–1995 – 1206 metres

=== Grade ===
- 1975–1978 - Principal Race
- 1979–1984 - Group 3
- 1985–2004 - Group 2
- 2005 onwards - Group 3

=== Name ===
- 1975–1978 - Moonee Valley Champagne Stakes
- 1979–1984 - Leilani Stakes
- 1985–1986 - Veuve Cliquot Classic
- 1987–1989 - The Veuve Cliquot
- 1990–1993 - The Laurent Perrier
- 1994 - Moet & Chandon Stakes
- 1995–2002 - Champagne Stakes
- 2003 - Club Lifestyle Stakes
- 2004 - Mitsubishi Stakes
- 2005–2015 - Champagne Stakes
- 2016 onwards - Scarborough Stakes

=== Venue ===
- 1995, 2026 - Held at Caulfield Racecourse

== Winners ==
The following are past winners of the race.

- 2026 - Over The Bridge
- 2025 - Snow Mercy
- 2024 - Bellatrix Star
- 2023 - Coeur Volante
- 2022 - Queen Of The Ball
- 2021 - Seradess
- 2020 - Swats That
- 2019 - Loving Gaby
- 2018 - Meryl
- 2017 - Houtzen
- 2016 - Selenia
- 2015 - Take Pride
- 2014 - Eloping
- 2013 - Thump
- 2012 - Snitzerland
- 2011 - Miss Stellabelle
- 2010 - Lone Rock
- 2009 - Avenue
- 2008 - Dan Baroness
- 2007 - Antarctic Miss
- 2006 - Estelle Collection
- 2005 - Virage De Fortune
- 2004 - Truly Wicked
- 2003 - Dilly Dally
- 2002 - Before Too Long
- 2001 - Fair Embrace
- 2000 - Ateates
- 1999 - I Am A Ripper
- 1998 - St. Clemens Belle
- 1997 - Adeewin
- 1996 - Always Divine
- 1995 - Bracken Bank
- 1994 - Love Of Mary
- 1993 - Kapchat
- 1992 - Klokka
- 1991 - Royal Accord
- 1990 - With Me
- 1989 - Courtza
- 1988 - Startling Lass
- 1987 - Midnight Fever
- 1986 - Society Bay
- 1985 - Canny Lass
- 1984 - Sauna
- 1983 - Look Aloft
- 1982 - Belle Stani
- 1981 - Darling Take Care
- 1980 - Heart Strings
- 1979 - Lady's Slipper
- 1978 - Red Coral
- 1977 - Proceed
- 1976 - Vivarchi
- 1975 - Miss Ollie

== See also ==
- John F. Feehan Stakes
- JRA Cup
- Manikato Stakes
- W H Stocks Stakes
- Bill Stutt Stakes
- List of Australian Group races
- Group races
