= Manikato Stakes =

- Class: Group 1
- Location: Moonee Valley Racecourse; Melbourne, Victoria
- Inaugurated: 1968
- Race type: Thoroughbred - Flat racing
- Sponsor: Ladbrokes (2017 - 2026)

Race information
- Distance: 1,200 metres
- Surface: Turf
- Track: Left-handed
- Qualification: Three years old and older
- Weight: Weight for Age
- Purse: $2,000,000 (2026)

The Manikato Stakes is a Moonee Valley Racing Club Group 1 Thoroughbred horse race for horses aged three years old and over under Weight for age conditions, over a distance of 1200 metres. It is held at Moonee Valley Racecourse in Melbourne, Australia in late September.

== History ==
The race is named after the great race horse Manikato, who won this race twice as well as winning 5 consecutive William Reid Stakes at Moonee Valley from 1979 to 1983.

In 2009 the event was part of the Breeders' Cup Challenge series with the winner of the Manikato Stakes automatically qualifying for a berth in the Breeders' Cup Turf Sprint in the United States.

From 2012, the race date was moved to Cox Plate Carnival Friday night in late October.

While the race is a sprinter's race there are 4 winners who have won the prestigious W. S. Cox Plate:

- Strawberry Road (1983), Rubiton (1987), Dane Ripper (1997) and Sunline (2000).

=== Distance ===
- 1968–1971 - 6 furlongs (~1200 metres)
- 1972 onwards - 1200 metres

=== Grade ===
- 1968–1978 - Principal race
- 1979–1988 - Group 2 race
- 1989 onwards - Group 1 race

=== Name ===
- 1968–1983 - Freeway Stakes
- 1984 onwards - Manikato Stakes

=== Record ===
Time: Track record for the 1200 metres at Moonee Valley is 1:08.76 set by Hey Doc in this race in 2020.

== Winners ==
The following are past winners of the race.

- 2026 - Jimmysstar
- 2025 - Charm Stone
- 2024 - Southport Tycoon
- 2023 - Imperatriz
- 2022 - Bella Nipotina
- 2021 - Jonker
- 2020 - Hey Doc
- 2019 - Loving Gaby
- 2018 - Brave Smash
- 2017 - Hey Doc
- 2016 - Rebel Dane
- 2015 - Chautauqua
- 2014 - Lankan Rupee
- 2013 - Buffering
- 2012 - Sea Siren
- 2011 - Sepoy
- 2010 - Hay List
- 2009 - Danleigh
- 2008 - Typhoon Zed
- 2007 - Gold Edition
- 2006 - Miss Andretti
- 2005 - Spark Of Life
- 2004 - Spark Of Life
- 2003 - Spinning Hill
- 2002 - Spinning Hill
- 2001 - Piavonic
- 2000 - Sunline
- 1999 - Redoute's Choice
- 1998 - Dane Ripper
- 1997 - Spartacus
- 1996 - Poetic King
- 1995 - You Remember
- 1994 - Spanish Mix
- 1993 - Never Undercharge
- 1992 - King Marauding
- 1991 - Sonic Express
- 1990 - Street Ruffian
- 1989 - Our Westminster
- 1988 - Rancho Ruler
- 1987 - Rubiton
- 1986 - Lockley's Tradition
- 1985 - Touch Of Genius
- 1984 - Vite Cheval
- 1983 - Strawberry Road
- 1982 - Manikato
- 1981 - Silver Bounty
- 1980 - Grey Sapphire
- 1979 - Manikato
- 1978 - Vice Regal
- 1977 - Ease The Squeeze
- 1976 - Scamanda
- 1975 - Lord Dudley
- 1974 - Tauto
- 1973 - Tauto
- 1972 - Century
- 1971 - Dual Choice
- 1970 - Dual Choice
- 1969 - Vain
- 1968 - Winfreux

== See also ==
- John F. Feehan Stakes
- JRA Cup
- Scarborough Stakes
- W H Stocks Stakes
- Bill Stutt Stakes
- List of Australian Group races
- Group races
