= Caulfield Guineas =

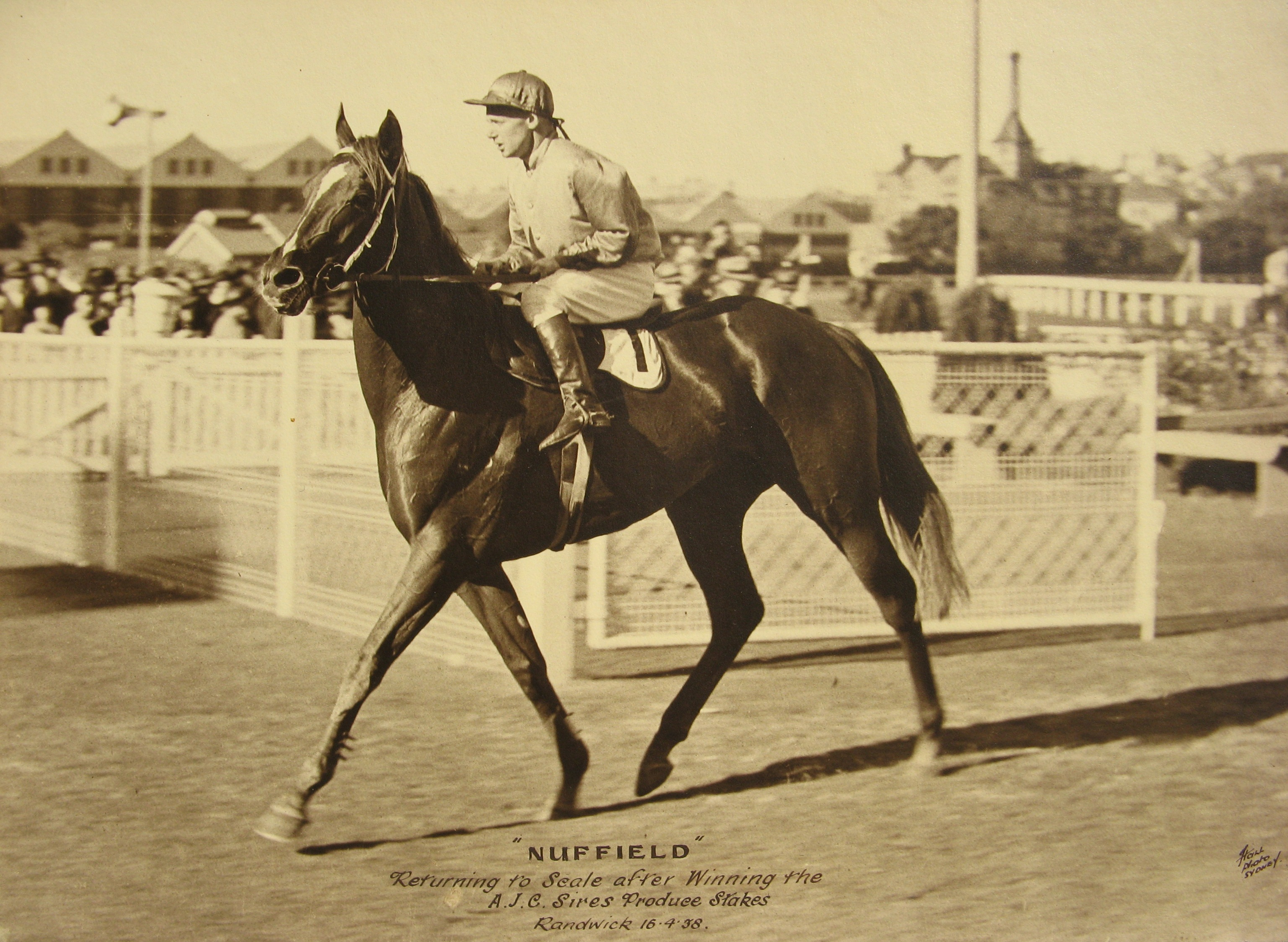
- Nuffield, 1938 winner H.Badger
- Class: Group 1
- Location: Caulfield Racecourse, Melbourne, Australia
- Inaugurated: 1881
- Race type: Thoroughbred
- Sponsor: Sportsbet (2024-26)

Race information
- Distance: 1,600 metres (1 mile)
- Surface: Turf
- Track: Left-handed
- Qualification: Three-year-olds
- Weight: Set weights - 56½ kg (125 lb)
- Purse: $3,000,000 (2026)

The Caulfield Guineas is a Melbourne Racing Club Group 1 Thoroughbred horse race held over 1600 metres (1 mile) at set weights for three-year-old horses at Caulfield Racecourse, Melbourne, Australia.

The race is held annually on the second Saturday in October and forms part of the Melbourne Spring Racing Carnival at Caulfield Racecourse.

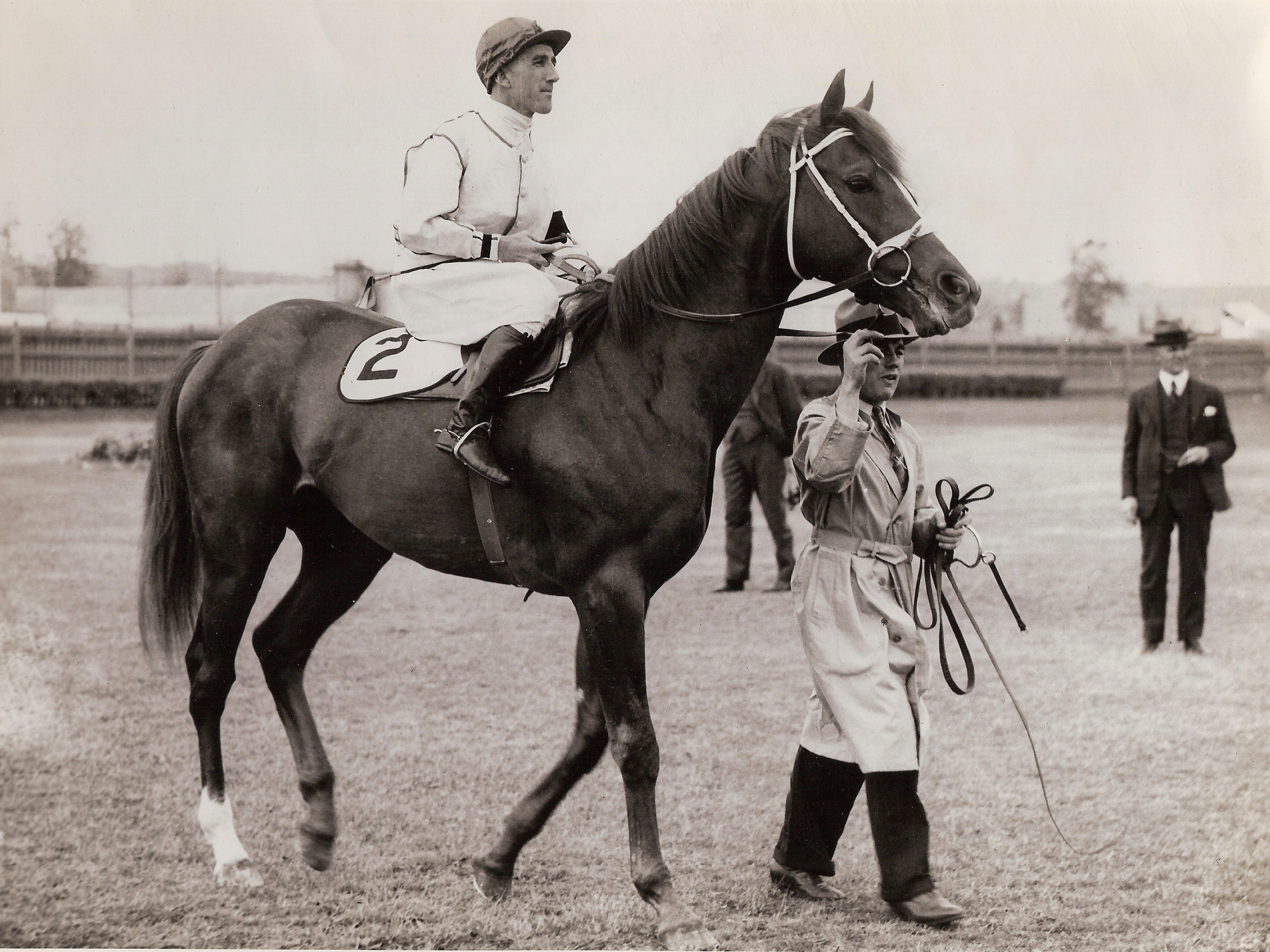
Ajax, 1937 winner

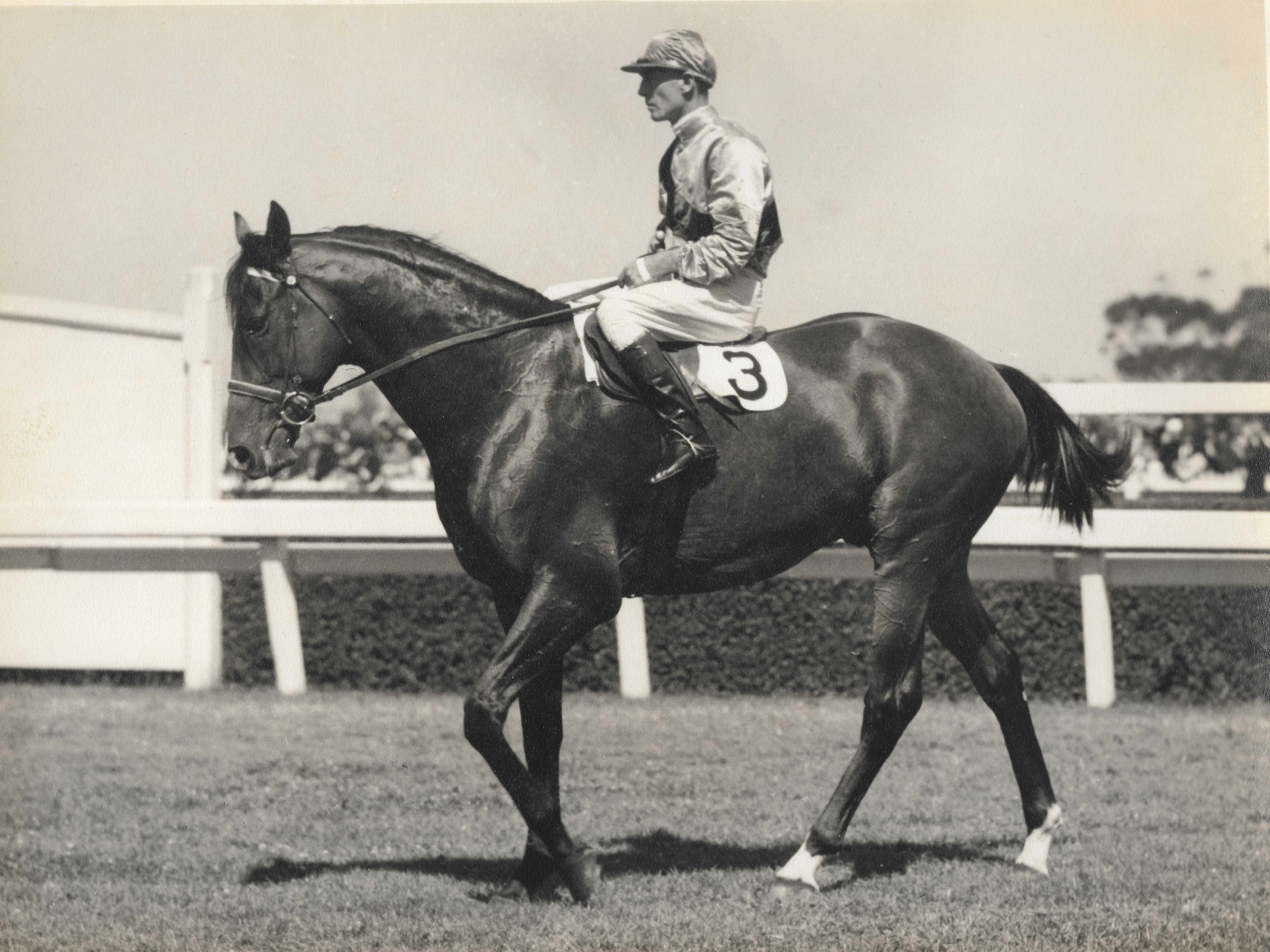
High Caste, 1939 winner

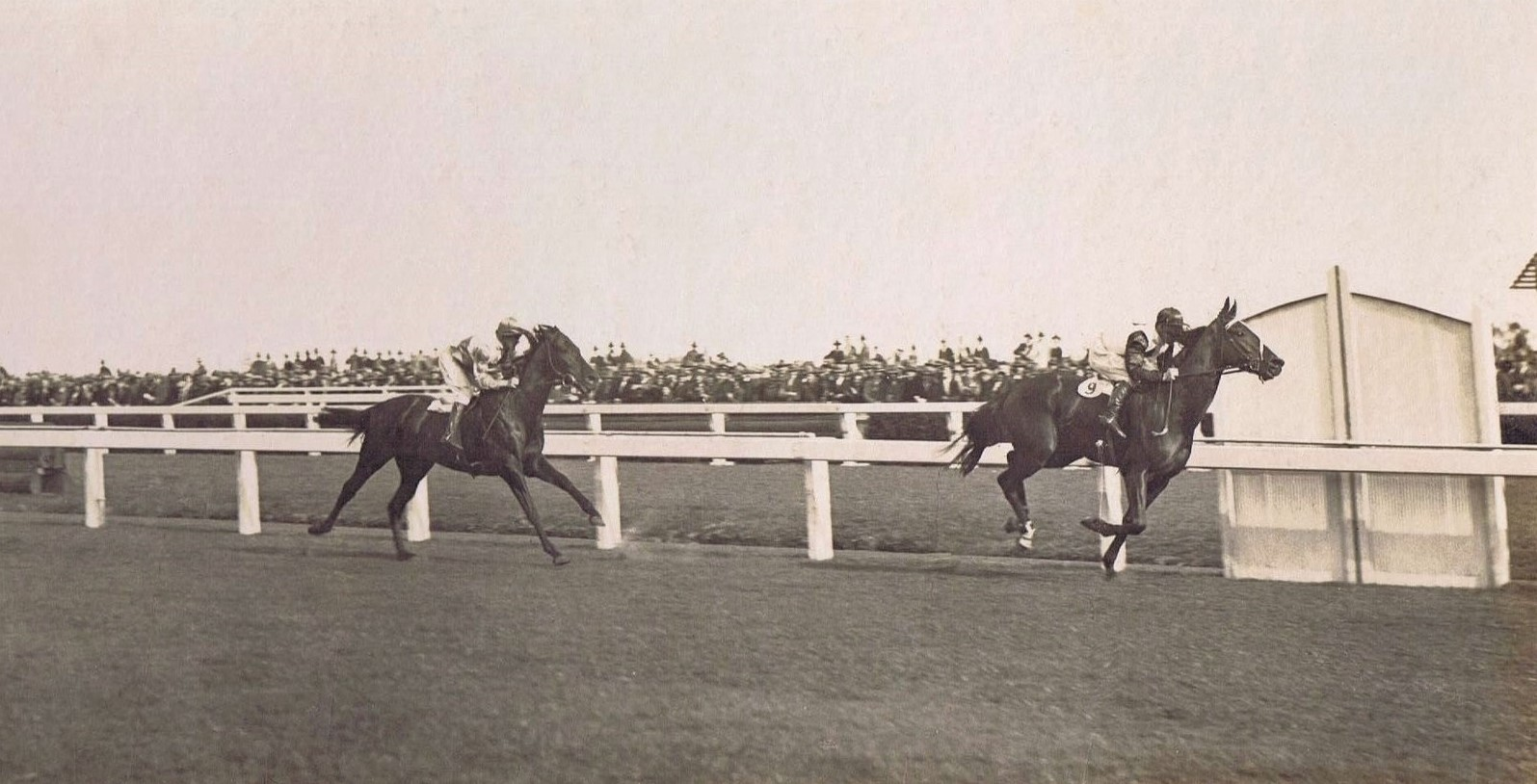
Ammon Ra, 1931 winner

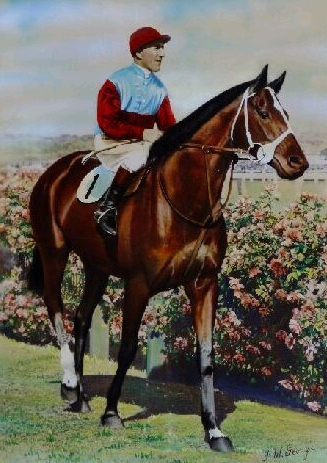
Lucrative, 1940 winner

== History ==
During World War II the race was run at Flemington Racecourse.

Regarded as one of the blue riband events for three-year-olds, the Guineas winners have included champion sires:

- Lonhro (2001, 11 G1 wins)
- Redoute's Choice (1999, 4 G1 wins)
- Vain (1969, 6 G1 wins).

It has been won by many other gallopers who have gone on to multiple G1 success including:

- Ajax (1937, 14 G1 wins and Australian Racing Hall of Fame inductee)
- Luskin Star (1977, 4 G1 wins)
- Mahogany (1993, 8 G1 wins)
- Manikato (1978, 12 official G1 wins, 18 wins in races that are classified as G1 today)
- Red Anchor (1984, 4 G1 wins)
- Surround (1976, first and only filly to win the Cox Plate)
- Storm Queen (1966, 5 G1 wins)
- Starspangledbanner (2009, winner of the 2010 G1 Oakleigh Plate, 2010 G1 Golden Jubilee Stakes)
- Tulloch (1957, 14 G1 wins) and the inaugural Australian Racing Hall of Fame inductee
- Weekend Hussler (2007, winner of six other G1 races including the 2007 G1 Ascot Vale Stakes, 2008 G1 Randwick Guineas and 2008 G1 George Ryder Stakes)

=== Distance ===
- 1881–1971 - 1 mile (~1600 metres)
- 1972 onwards - 1600 metres (1 mile)

=== Grade ===
- 1886–1978 - Principal race
- 1979 onwards - Group 1

=== Double winners ===
Thoroughbreds that have won the Caulfield Guineas – W. S. Cox Plate double:

- Star Affair (1965), Rajah Sahib (1968), †Surround (1976), Red Anchor (1984)

Thoroughbreds that have won the Caulfield Guineas – Victoria Derby double:

- Strathmore (1891), Wallace (1895), †Lady Wallace (1905), Patrobas (1915), Eusebius (1918), Rampion (1926), Liberal (1932), Theo (1934), Lucrative (1940), Great Britain (1942), Tulloch (1957), Coppelius (1962), Sovereign Red (1980), Grosvenor (1982), Red Anchor (1984), Mahogany (1993), Helenus (2002)

† filly

=== Recent multiple winners ===
Jockeys

- James McDonald (2014, 2018 and 2022)
- Steven King (2000 and 2002)
- Damian Lane (2024 and 2025)
- Kerrin McEvoy (2011 and 2013).

Trainers

- Chris Waller (2015, 2018, 2024 and 2025)
- Michael, John & Wayne Hawkes (2012, 2016 and 2020) and John Hawkes in 2001
- Peter Snowden (2011, 2013 and 2014)

=== 1922 and 1948 racebooks ===
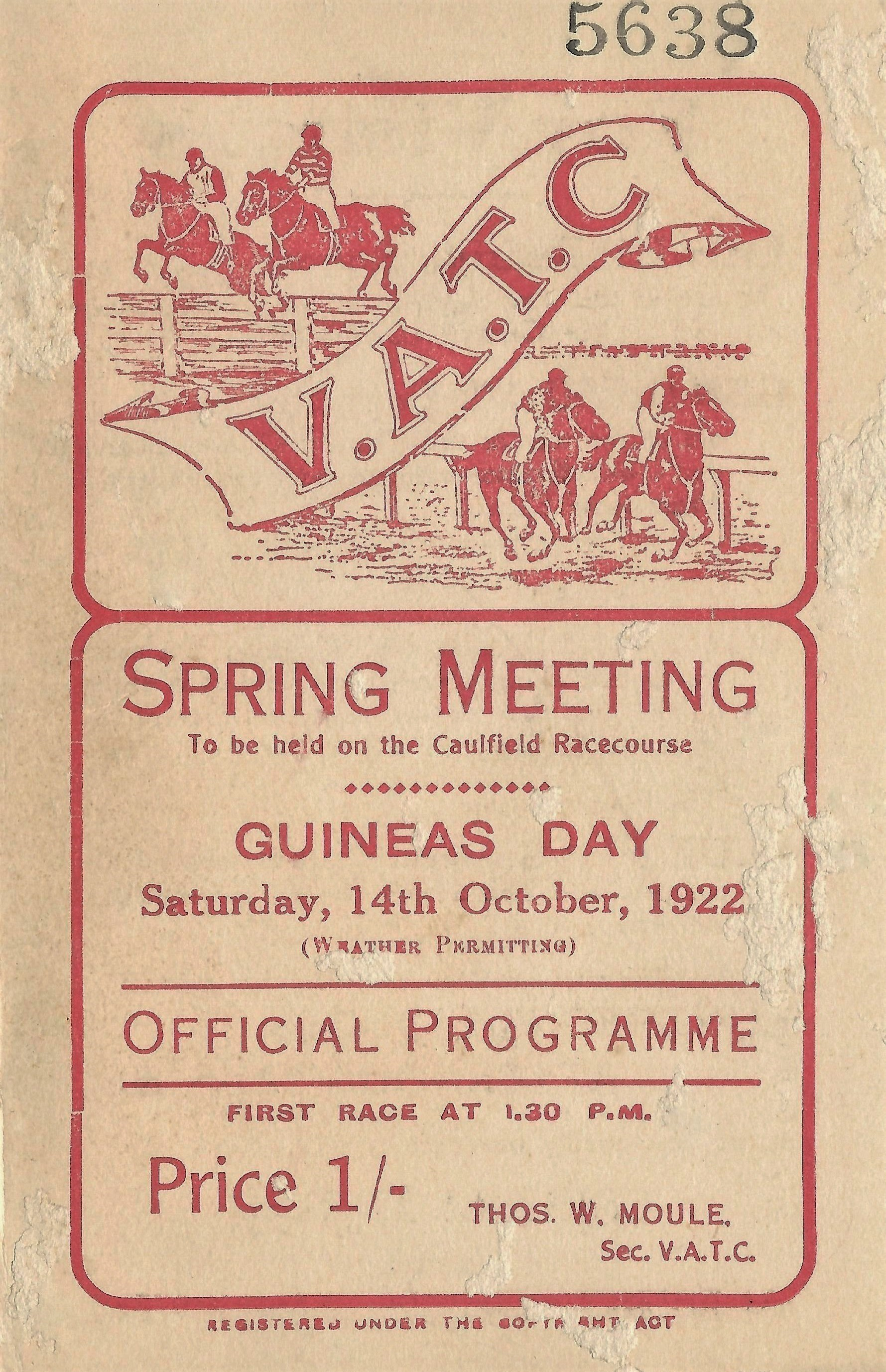
1922 VATC Caulfield Guineas racebook front cover

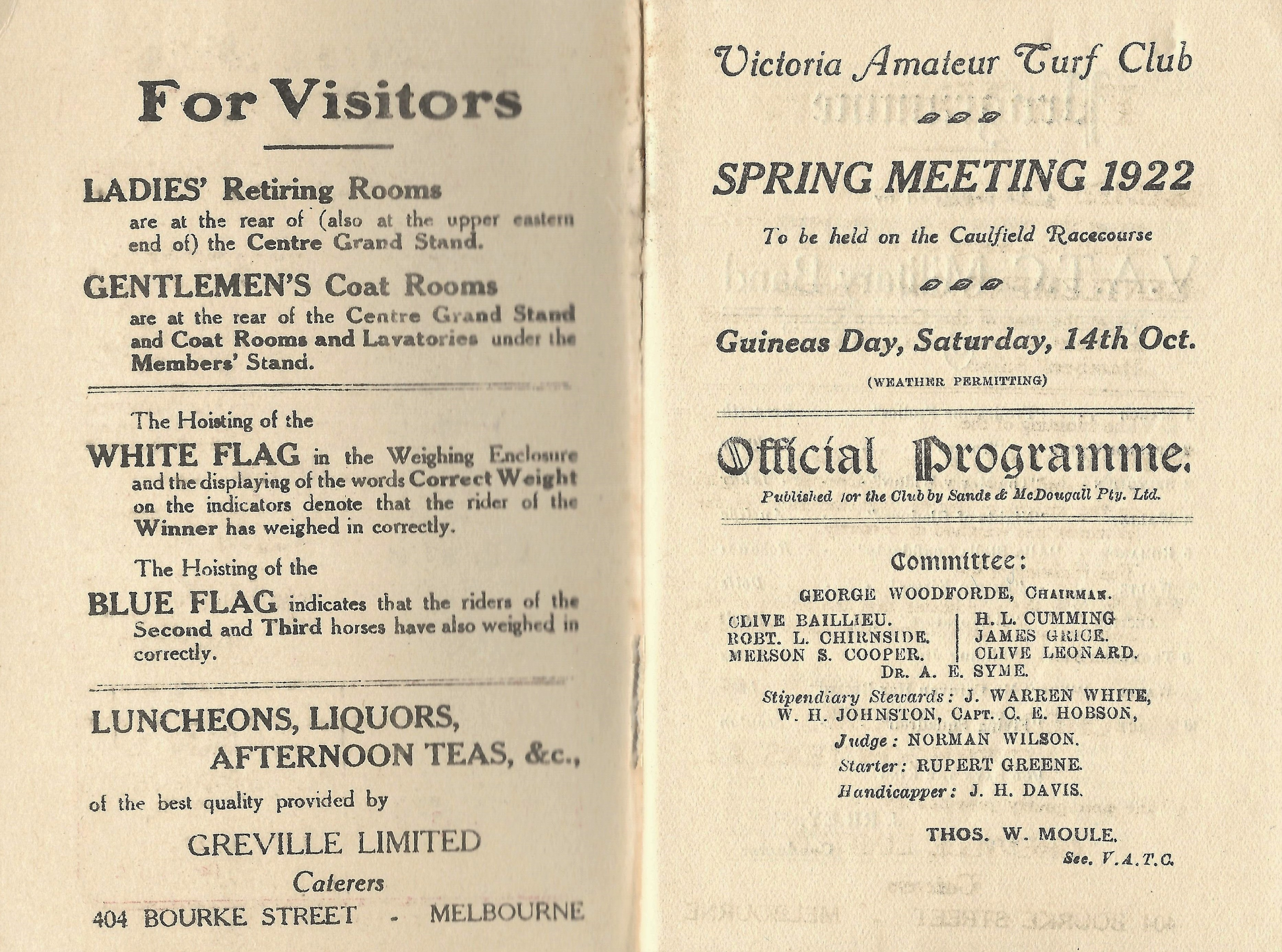
1922 VATC Caulfield Guineas officials & visitor notices

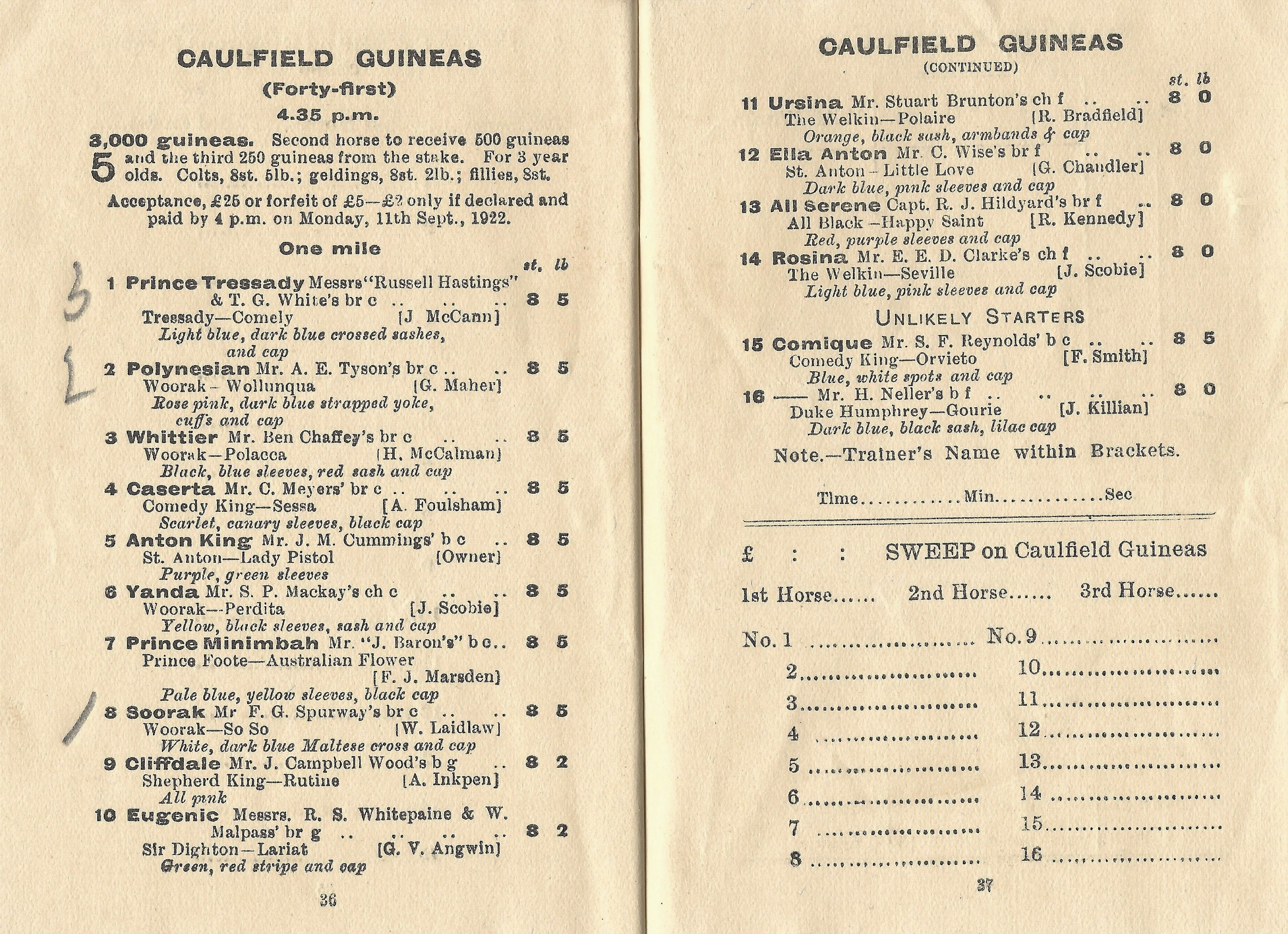
1922 VATC Caulfield Guineas showing the winner, Soorak

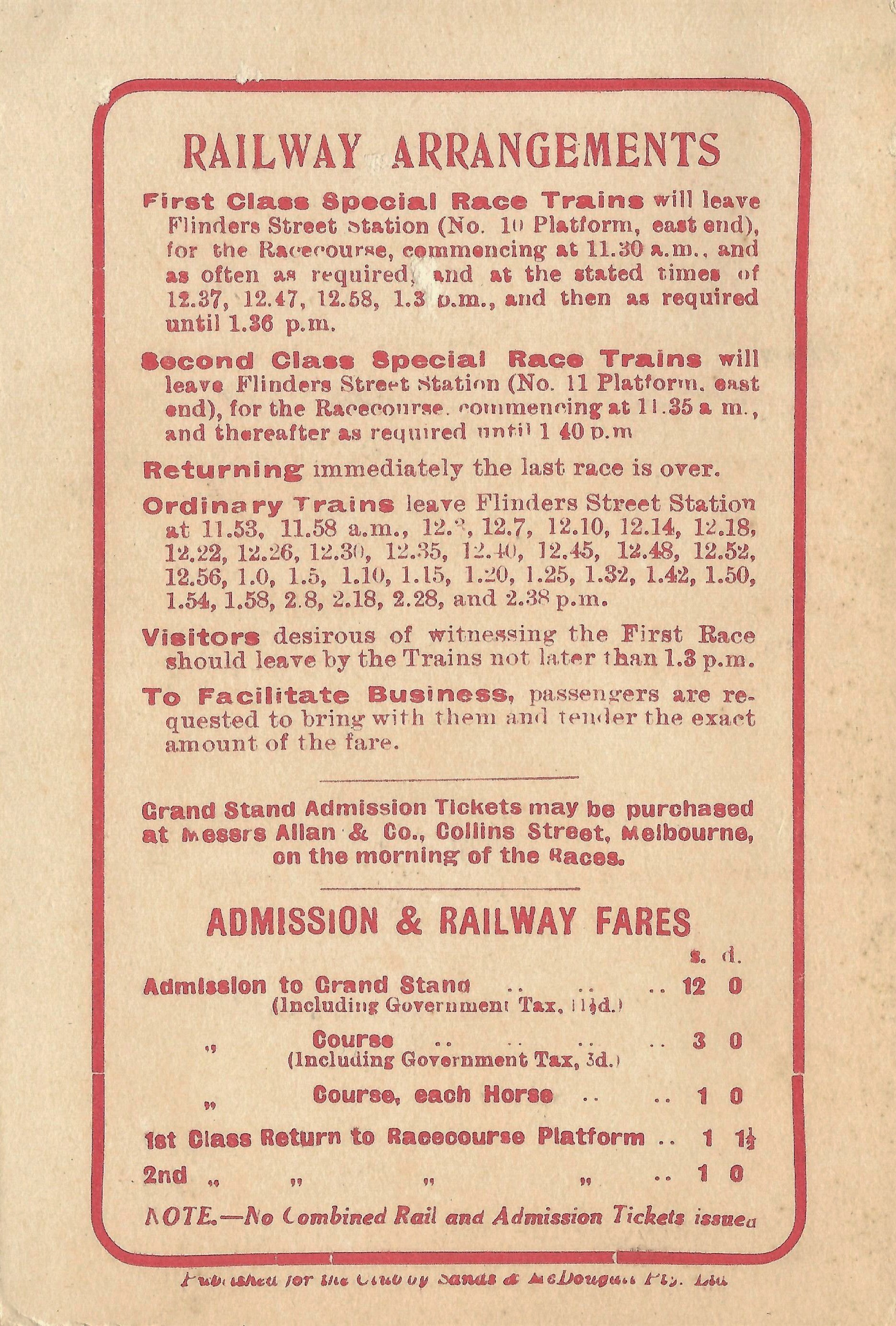
Back cover showing railway arrangements and admission fares

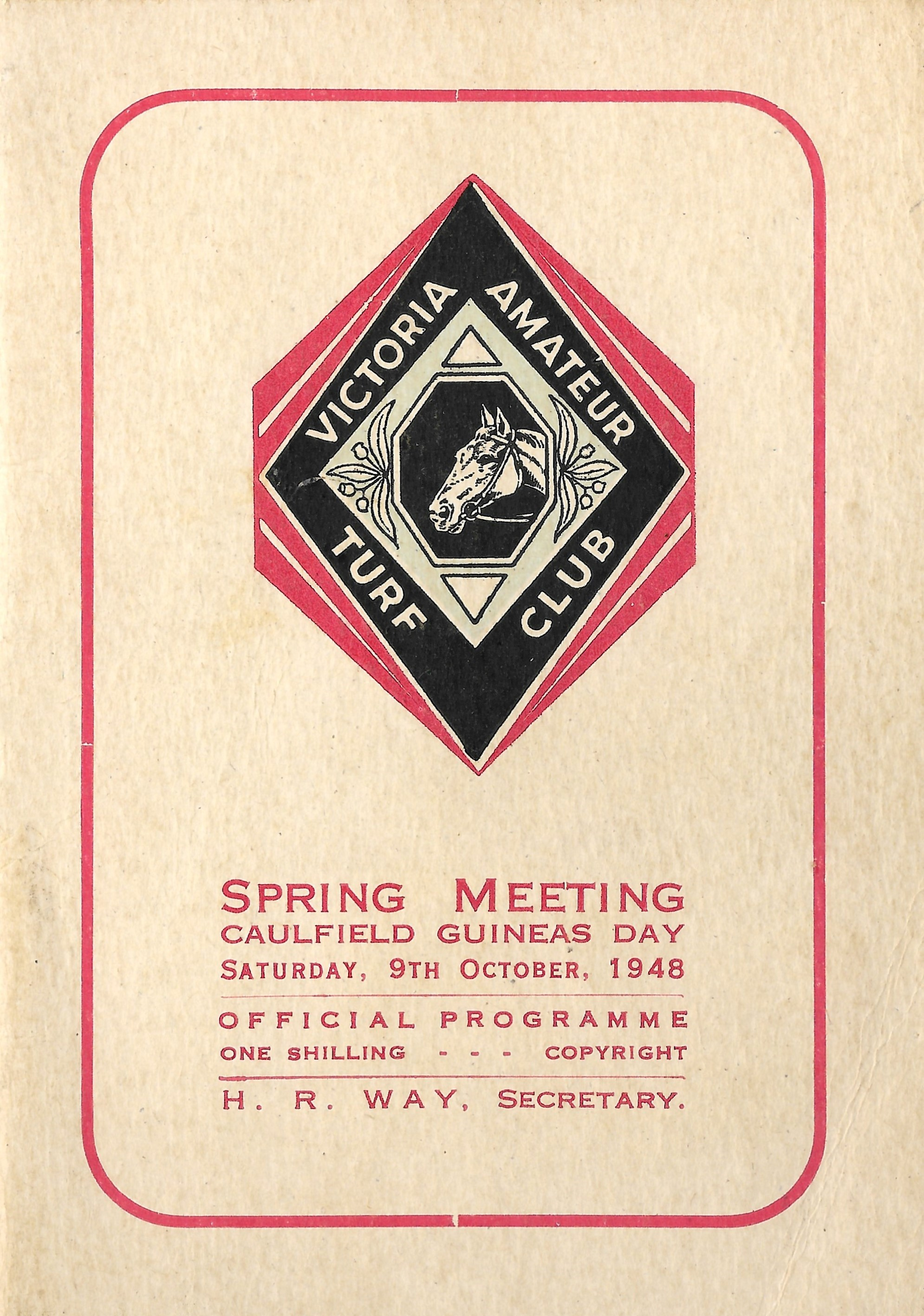
1948 VATC Caulfield Guineas racebook front cover

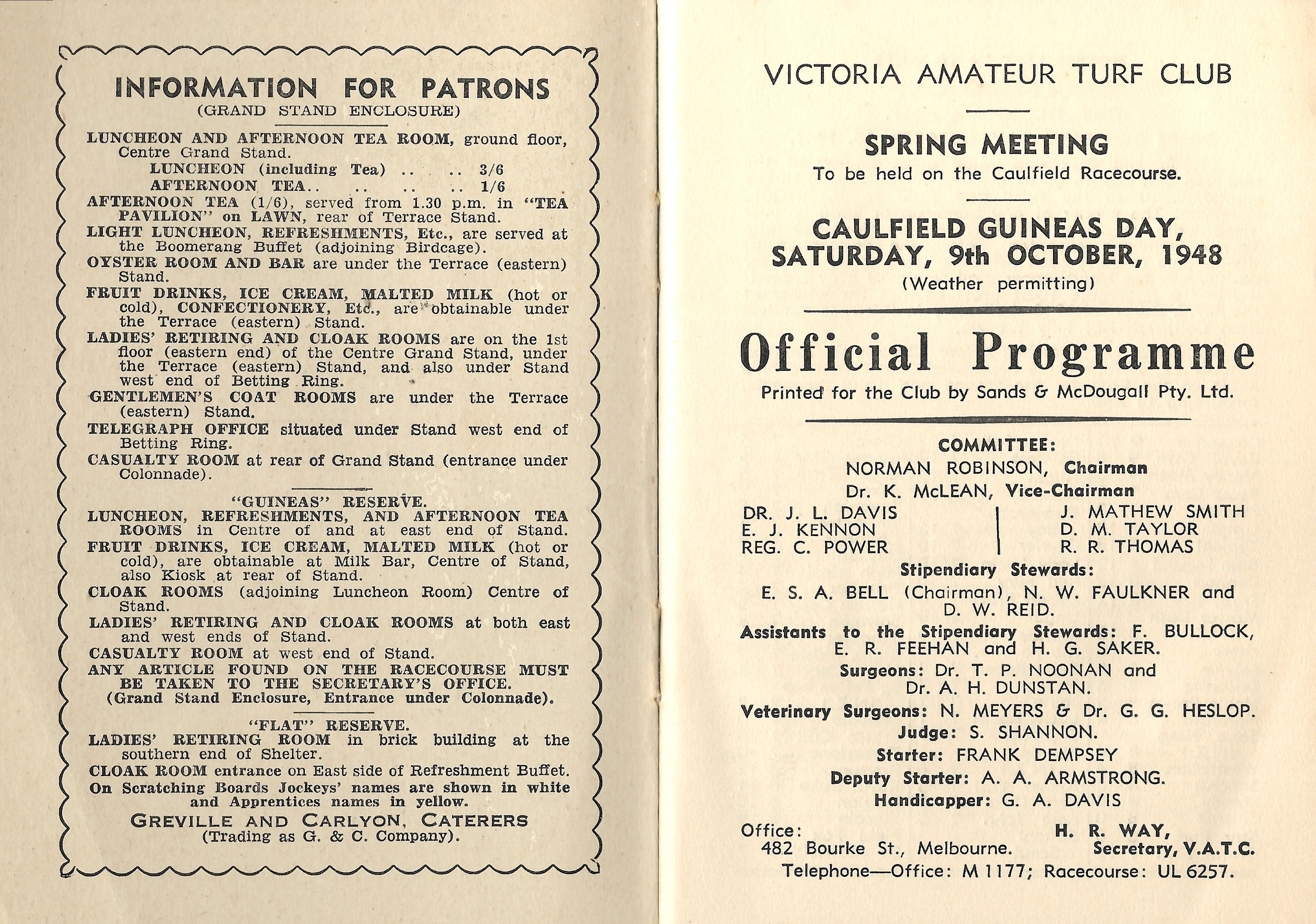
1948 VATC Caulfield Guineas officials & enclosure notices

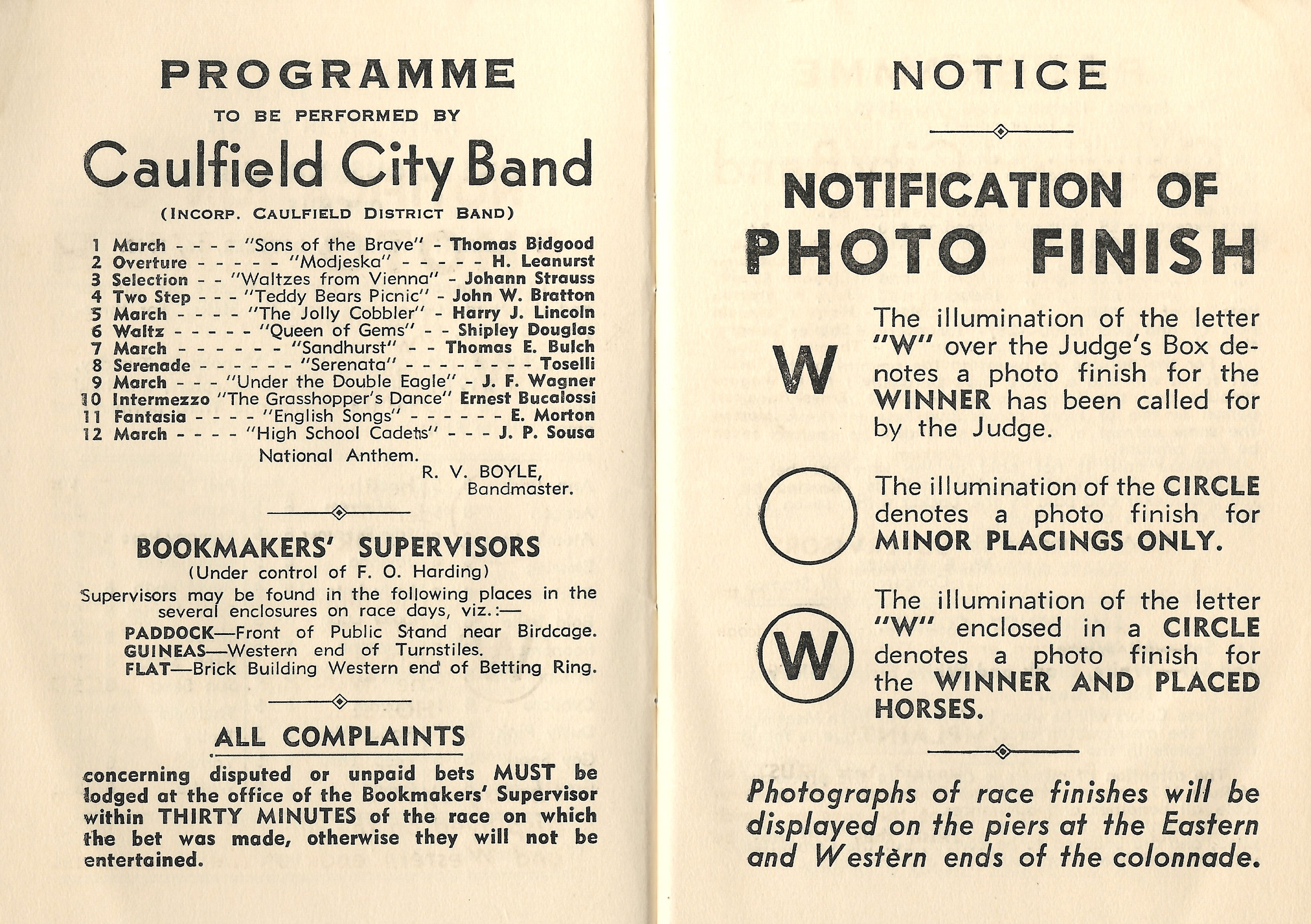
1948 VATC Caulfield Guineas raceday notices

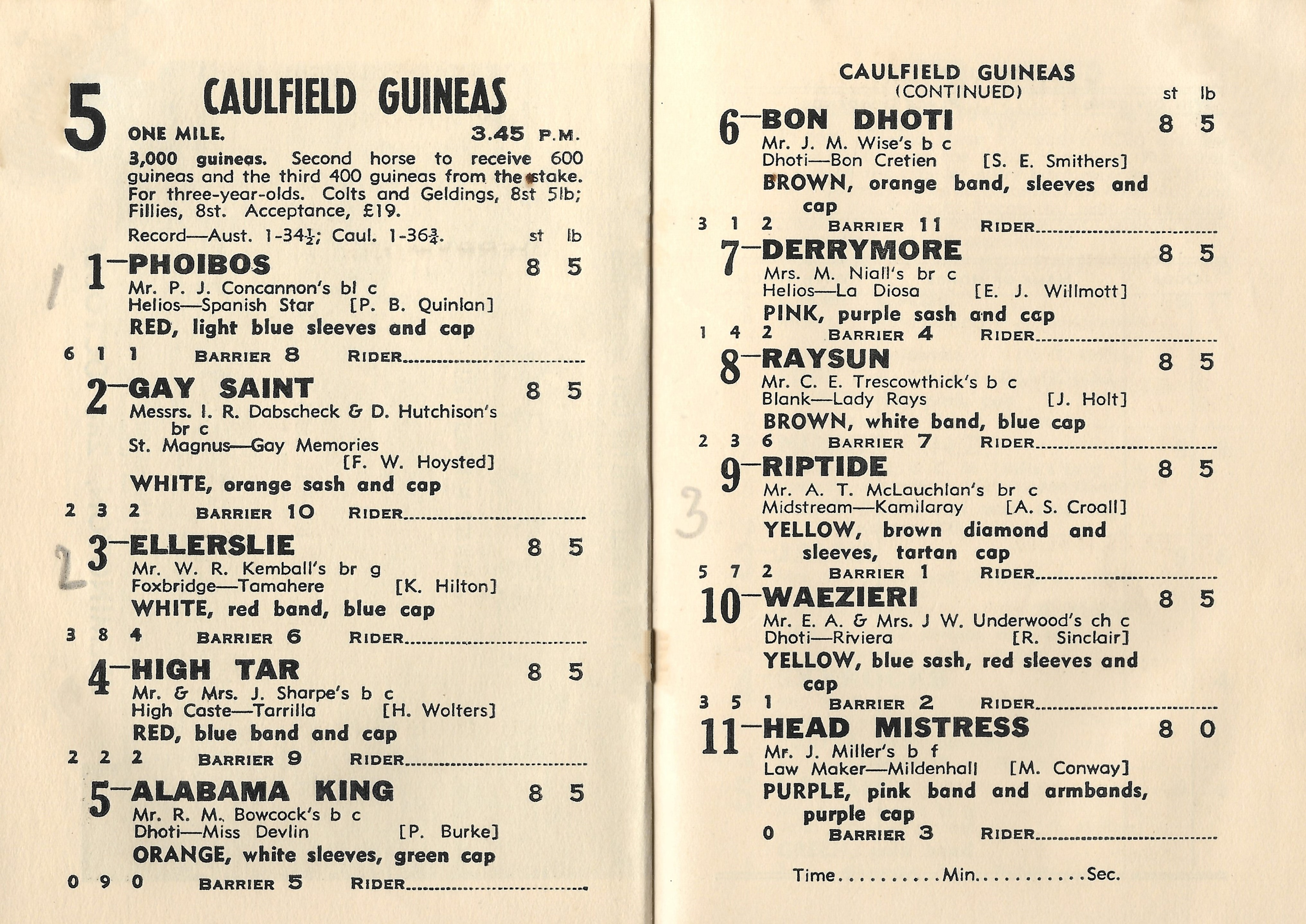
1948 VATC Caulfield Guineas showing the winner, Phoibos

== Winners ==
The following are past winners of the Caulfield Guineas.

Caulfield Guineas results since 2010
Year	Horse	Sex	Jockey	Trainer	Sire	Time	Margin	Track	Odds	Second	Third
2026	Warwoven	C	Rachel King	Bjorn Baker	Sword Of State	1:35.17	1.75L	Good 3		Blind Raise	Call Me Coach
2025	Autumn Boy	C	Damian Lane	Chris Waller	The Autumn Sun	1:36.30	0.75L	Good 3	$4.20	Planet Red	Observer
2024	Private Life	C	Damian Lane	Chris Waller	Written Tycoon	1:36.74	0.15L	Good 3	$13	Feroce	Evaporate
2023	Griff	C	Ben Melham	Ciaron Maher & Dave Eustace	Trapeze Artist	1.37.97	1.75L	Good 4	$31	Veight	Steparty
2022	Golden Mile	C	James McDonald	James Cummings	Astern	1.38.21	0.2L	Soft 5	$2.10	Elliptical	Osipenko
2021	Anamoe	C	Damien Oliver	James Cummings	Street Boss	1.35.00	0.5L	Good 3	$2.10	Captivant	Artorius
2020	Ole Kirk	C	William Pike	Michael, Wayne & John Hawkes	Written Tycoon	1.36.38	0.4L	Good 3	$4.20	Aysar	Grandslam
2019	Super Seth	C	Mark Zahra	Anthony Freedman	Dundeel	1.36.44	0.1L	Good 3	$7.50	Alligator Blood	Groundswell
2018	The Autumn Sun	C	James McDonald	Chris Waller	Redoute's Choice	1.35.58	4.5L	Good 3	$1.70	Vassilator	Oohood
2017	Mighty Boss	C	Michael Walker	Mick Price	Not A Single Doubt	1.36.04	0.3L	Good 3	$101	Kementari	Catchy
2016	Divine Prophet	C	Dwayne Dunn	Michael, Wayne & John Hawkes*	Choisir	1.36.51	0.2L	Good 3	$7.00	Seaburge	Hey Doc
2015	Press Statement	C	Hugh Bowman	Chris Waller	Hinchinbrook	1.36.47	1.75L	Good 3	$2.50	Lizard Island	Ready For Victory
2014	Shooting To Win	C	James McDonald	Peter & Paul Snowden*	Northern Meteor	1.35.58	0.3L	Good 3	$7.50	Rich Enuff	Wandjina
2013	Long John	G	Kerrin McEvoy	Peter & Paul Snowden*	Street Cry	1.36.37	0.5L	Good 3	$3.80	Divine Calling	Shamus Award
2012	All Too Hard	C	Dwayne Dunn	Michael, Wayne & John Hawkes*	Casino Prince	1.36.05	0.5L	Good 3	$12.00	Pierro	Epaulette
2011	Helmet	C	Kerrin McEvoy	Peter & Paul Snowden*	Exceed And Excel	1.35.36	0.2L	Good 4	$2.20	Manawanui	Huegill
2010	Anacheeva	C	Luke Nolen	Peter Moody	Anabaa	1.37.01	0.4L	Good 3	$6.00	Run For Levi	Masquerader

=== Previous years ===
- 2009 - Starspangledbanner
- 2008 - Whobegotyou
- 2007 - Weekend Hussler
- 2006 - Wonderful World
- 2005 - God's Own
- 2004 - Econsul
- 2003 - In Top Swing
- 2002 - Helenus
- 2001 - Lonhro
- 2000 - Show A Heart
- 1999 - Redoute's Choice
- 1998 - Kenwood Melody
- 1997 - Encounter
- 1996 - Alfa
- 1995 - Our Maizcay
- 1994 - St. Covet
- 1993 - Mahogany
- 1992 - Palace Reign
- 1991 - Chortle
- 1990 - Centro
- 1989 - Procol Harum
- 1988 - Vitalic
- 1987 - Marwong
- 1986 - Abaridy
- 1985 - Drawn
- 1984 - Red Anchor
- 1983 - Beechcraft
- 1982 - Grosvenor
- 1981 - Binbinga
- 1980 - Sovereign Red
- 1979 - Runaway Kid
- 1978 - Manikato
- 1977 - Luskin Star
- 1976 - Surround
- 1975 - Sou'wester
- 1974 - Kenmark
- 1973 - Grand Cidium
- 1972 - Sobar
- 1971 - Beau Sovereign
- 1970 - Dual Choice
- 1969 - Vain
- 1968 - Rajah Sahib
- 1967 - Dark Purple
- 1966 - Storm Queen
- 1965 - Star Affair
- 1964 - Yangtze
- 1963 - Time And Tide
- 1962 - Coppelius
- 1961 - King Brian
- 1960 - Lady Sybil
- 1959 - Prince Lea
- 1958 - Wiggle
- 1957 - Tulloch
- 1956 - Hot Spell
- 1955 - Caranna
- 1954 - King Boru
- 1953 - Barfleur
- 1952 - Bayside
- 1951 - Hydrogen
- 1950 - Merry Scout
- 1949 - Iron Duke
- 1948 - Phoibos
- 1947 - Hororata
- 1946 - Praetor
- 1945 - † Attley / Royal Gem
- 1944 - Kintore
- 1943 - Lawrence
- 1942 - Great Britain
- 1941 - Tea Cake
- 1940 - Lucrative
- 1939 - High Caste
- 1938 - Nuffield
- 1937 - Ajax
- 1936 - Beechwood
- 1935 - Young Idea
- 1934 - Theo
- 1933 - Palphar
- 1932 - Liberal
- 1931 - Ammon Ra
- 1930 - Green Wave
- 1929 - Pentheus
- 1928 - Balmerino
- 1927 - Avant Courier
- 1926 - Rampion
- 1925 - Manacre
- 1924 - Heroic
- 1923 - King Carnival
- 1922 - Soorak
- 1921 - Demetrius
- 1920 - Midilli
- 1919 - Artilleryman
- 1918 - Eusebius
- 1917 - Thrice
- 1916 - Ettefred
- 1915 - Patrobas
- 1914 - Blague
- 1913 - Andelosia
- 1912 - Burrawang
- 1911 - Woolerina
- 1910 - Danaus
- 1909 - Malt King
- 1908 - Parsee
- 1907 - Master Foote
- 1906 - Booran
- 1905 - Lady Wallace
- 1904 - Demas
- 1903 - Sweet Nell
- 1902 - Strata Florida
- 1901 - Ibex
- 1900 - Kinglike
- 1899 - Tremarden
- 1898 - Bobadil
- 1897 - Aurum
- 1896 - The Officer
- 1895 - Wallace
- 1894 - Cobbity
- 1893 - Patron
- 1892 - Autonomy
- 1891 - Strathmore
- 1890 - Annesley
- 1889 - Rudolph
- 1888 - Volley
- 1887 - Carlyon
- 1886 - Maddelina
- 1885 - Ringmaster
- 1884 - Sandal
- 1883 - Sardius
- 1882 - Fryingpan
- 1881 - Wheatear

† Dead heat

== See also ==
- Caulfield Guineas Prelude
- Ladies Day Vase
- Herbert Power Stakes
- Northwood Plume Stakes
- Schillaci Stakes
- The Might and Power (Caulfield Stakes)
- Toorak Handicap
- List of Australian Group races
- Group races
