= Hey Doc =

Australian thoroughbred racehorse

- Sire: Duporth
- Grandsire: Red Ransom
- Dam: Heyington Honey
- Damsire: General Nediym
- Sex: Gelding
- Foaled: 2013
- Country: Australia
- Colour: Bay
- Breeder: A Hall
- Owner: AF Ramsay, AC Hall, PM George, MJ Davidson, DM Mahony, GS Tucker, JF & JW Higgins, MF & AJ James, BS Evans, JM Tynan, JM Harvey, DP, R, SR & PH Smith, GC & NJ Babich, Lucky Fifteen
- Trainer: Tony & Calvin McEvoy
- Record: 32: 10–2–3
- Earnings: A$ 3,112,025

Major wins
- Stutt Stakes (2016); C S Hayes Stakes (2017); Australian Guineas (2017); Aurie's Star Handicap (2017); Manikato Stakes (2017, 2020); Winterbottom Stakes (2019)

Awards
- 2016-17 South Australian Horse of the Year

Hey Doc (foaled 7 September 2013) is a retired Australian bred thoroughbred racehorse that won four Group 1 races, most notably the Manikato Stakes on two occasions.

== Background ==
Hey Doc was sold at the Inglis Victorian yearling sales for the amount of A$85,000.

== Racing career ==
Hey Doc was successful in his racing debut, winning a two-year-old race at Morphettville Racecourse.

As a three-year-old, Hey Doc raced on ten occasions, recording 5 wins, culminating in his first Group 1 race the Australian Guineas.

In his next preparation, Hey Doc won his second Group 1 race when successful in the Manikato Stakes at the odds of 20/1.

After an unsuccessful campaign following this victory, Hey Doc was sidelined from racing for over 12 months due to an operation to remove bone chips from a joint.

He returned to racing with success at his second run, winning his third Group 1 the Winterbottom Stakes at the odds of 12/1.

As a seven-year-old, Hey Doc won his second Manikato Stakes at Moonee Valley defeating Trekking by three quarters of a length and setting a new track record time of 1:08.76 for the 1,200 metre event.

In the 2020 World's Best Racehorse Rankings, Hey Doc was rated on 118, making him the equal 80th best racehorse in the world.

In 2021 it was announced that Hey Doc would be retired from racing.
