= Vain (horse) =

Australian-bred Thoroughbred racehorse

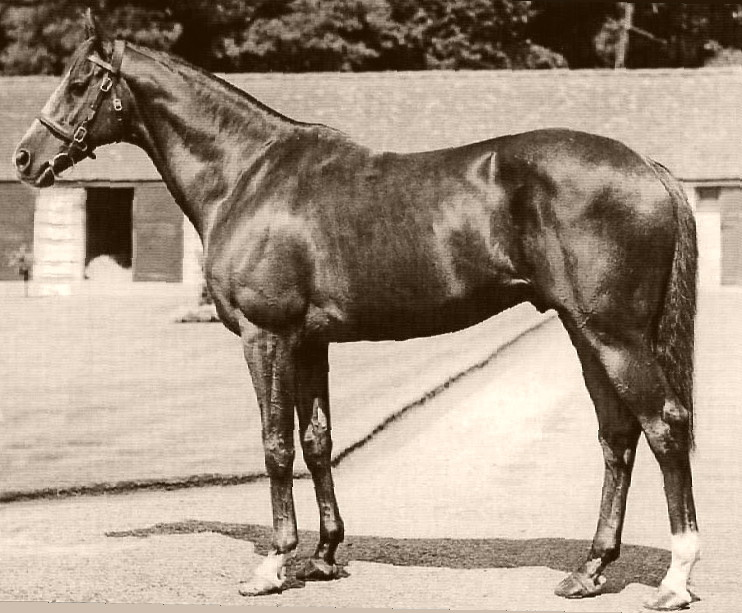
- Court Martial, the grand-sire of Vain
- Sire: Wilkes (FR)
- Grandsire: Court Martial
- Dam: Elated
- Damsire: Orgoglio (GB)
- Sex: Stallion
- Foaled: 5 September 1966
- Died: 25 December 1991 (aged 25)
- Country: Australia
- Colour: Chestnut
- Breeder: Walter, Fred and George Johnson
- Owner: Walter, Fred and George Johnson
- Trainer: Jim Moloney
- Jockey: Pat Hyland
- Record: 14: 12–2–0
- Earnings: A$148,485

Major wins
- Maribyrnong Plate (1968); VRC Sires Produce Stakes (1969); Golden Slipper Stakes (1969); Champagne Stakes (1969); Freeway Stakes (1969); Ascot Vale Stakes (1969); Caulfield Guineas (1969); Craven 'A' Stakes (1969); Linlithgow Stakes (1969); George Adams Handicap (1969)

Awards
- Australian Champion Racehorse of the Year (1969–70); Leading sire in Australia (1983–84)

Honours
- Australian Racing Hall of Fame (2003); Vain Stakes, Caulfield Racecourse
- Last updated on 20 July 2011

Vain (5 September 1966 – 25 December 1991) was a champion Thoroughbred racehorse that dominated Australian sprint racing in the period 1968–70, when he won 12 of the 14 races he contested and ran second in the other two. He went on to become a leading sire in Australia.

The chestnut colt was sired by the leading sire Wilkes (FR), and his dam, Elated, was by the good sire Orgoglio (GB), who sired 21 stakes winners that had 37 stakes wins. Elated was a good racemare that won 10 races, including eight in Melbourne. Although she produced several foals, Vain was her only stakes winner.

== Racing career ==
Vain was bred and raced by Melbourne brothers Walter, Fred, and George Johnson and was trained by Jim Moloney in the Melbourne suburb of Mordialloc. His regular jockey was Pat Hyland, who rode him to all his wins.

=== At two years ===
As a two-year-old, Vain was undefeated in Melbourne in the spring of 1968 and autumn of 1969, winning races such as the VRC Sires Produce. Moving to Sydney, he won the STC Golden Slipper Stakes by four lengths and the AJC Champagne Stakes by 10 lengths, the latter in the fastest time ever recorded for a two-year-old over six furlongs.

=== At three years ===
As a three-year-old, Vain won the VATC Caulfield Guineas by three lengths, then campaigned in the VRC Spring Carnival, winning over eight days the Craven 'A' Stakes by 12 lengths and the VRC Linlithgow Stakes by six lengths. In his final race, he carried a record 10 lb over weight-for-age in winning the 1969 George Adams Handicap. Vain set Australian prize money records as a two-year-old and three-year-old. His only defeat as a three-year-old was against the champion New Zealand colt Daryl's Joy, who also won the Cox Plate and Victoria Derby and who later raced successfully in the United States as a stayer including winning at group one level.

== Stud record ==
He was retired to stud at the end of his three-year-old season, in 1970, when he was injured in a track gallop. He was placed at Widden Stud in the Hunter Valley, where he sired 370 winners, among them winning almost 1,800 races. Vain sired two Golden Slipper winners and was a leading sire in Australia. He is also the great-great grand-sire of Black Caviar on the dam side (as the sire of Song of Norway-1982, the great grand-sire of Black Caviar) and the great grand-sire of Black Caviar on the sire side (as the sire of Bespoken-1990, the grand-sire of Black Caviar).

Vain sired 44 stakes winners that had 96 stakes wins, including:

- Inspired (won Golden Slipper Stakes etc.)
- Kenmark (won Caulfield Guineas etc.)
- Mistress Anne (Oakleigh Plate and AJC The Galaxy)
- Rainbeam (Silver Slipper Stakes), the dam of New Zealand champion sire Centaine
- Sir Dapper (Golden Slipper Stakes)

Vain died on 25 December 1991. He was the Australian Champion Racehorse of the Year in 1969–70 and was inducted into the Australian Racing Hall of Fame.

== Pedigree ==
Pedigree of Vain (AUS) 1966
Sire Wilkes (FR) 1952	Court Martial (GB); 1942	Fair Trial	Fairway
Sire Wilkes (FR) 1952	Court Martial (GB); 1942	Fair Trial	Lady Juror
Sire Wilkes (FR) 1952	Court Martial (GB); 1942	Instantaneous	Hurry On
Sire Wilkes (FR) 1952	Court Martial (GB); 1942	Instantaneous	Picture
Sire Wilkes (FR) 1952	Sans Tares (GB); 1939	Sind	Solario
Sire Wilkes (FR) 1952	Sans Tares (GB); 1939	Sind	Mirawala
Sire Wilkes (FR) 1952	Sans Tares (GB); 1939	Tara	Teddy
Sire Wilkes (FR) 1952	Sans Tares (GB); 1939	Tara	Jean Gow
Dam Elated (AUS) 1957	Orgoglio (GB); 1949	Nasrullah	Nearco
Dam Elated (AUS) 1957	Orgoglio (GB); 1949	Nasrullah	Mumtaz Begum
Dam Elated (AUS) 1957	Orgoglio (GB); 1949	Orienne	Sol Oriens
Dam Elated (AUS) 1957	Orgoglio (GB); 1949	Orienne	Birth Child
Dam Elated (AUS) 1957	Rarcamba (AUS); 1946	Helios	Hyperion
Dam Elated (AUS) 1957	Rarcamba (AUS); 1946	Helios	Foxy Gal
Dam Elated (AUS) 1957	Rarcamba (AUS); 1946	Denis Pop	Denis Boy
Dam Elated (AUS) 1957	Rarcamba (AUS); 1946	Denis Pop	Lady Pop

== See also ==
- List of racehorses
