= Shogun Lodge =

Australian Thoroughbred racehorse

- Sire: Grand Lodge (USA)
- Dam: Pride of Tahnee
- Damsire: Best Western
- Sex: Gelding
- Foaled: 25 September 1996
- Died: 8 November 2003 (aged 7)
- Country: Australia
- Colour: Chestnut
- Breeder: I. Millard, A. Millard
- Trainer: Bob Thomsen
- Record: 58: 13-12-8
- Earnings: A$4,640,314

Major wins
- Canonbury Stakes (1998); Skyline Stakes (1999); Spring Stakes (1999); George Main Stakes (1999); Tulloch Stakes (2000); Hollindale Stakes (2000, 2001); Epsom Handicap (2000); Canterbury Stakes (2001); Queen Elizabeth Stakes (2001); Theo Marks Stakes (2001)
- Last updated on 5 June 2009

Shogun Lodge (25 September 1996 – 8 November 2003) was an Australian Thoroughbred racehorse by American sire Grand Lodge.

Shogun Lodge won three Group One races, and remarkably ran 2nd in a further 12 Group 1 races.

On 8 November 2003, Shogun Lodge collapsed and died while competing in the Emirates Stakes. It was later revealed he died of a heart attack after suffering a lung haemorrhage during the race.

== Racing career ==
Shogun Lodge made a winning debut in the Listed Canonbury Stakes at Randwick on 3 October 1998, and won three of his four starts prior to the Golden Slipper, in which he started favourite and finished a close third. At three and four, Shogun Lodge won his Group One races, the Epsom Handicap, the Queen Elizabeth Stakes, and the George Main Stakes, in which he defeated the champion mare Sunline. Shogun Lodge won stakes races at two, three, four, five, and seven, and prize money of $4,640,315. In addition, Shogun Lodge was runner-up in 12 Group One races, including the Doncaster Handicap (twice) and the Victoria and AJC Derbies, and, since the introduction of the Group system in the late-1970s, few if any horses have been runner-up in more. These 12 races included defeats by the champions Northerly, Sunline, and Lonhro, and he lost three races by a short-half-head. In one of his greatest performances, Shogun Lodge was beaten by Sunline in head-bobbing finish to the 2002 Doncaster Handicap, in which both horses carried topweight of 58 kilos, and gave 6.5 kilos to Defier, who went on to win three Group One races at weight-for-age. At his next start, in the Queen Elizabeth Stakes, Shogun Lodge ran one of his worst races, finishing second-last, and, in an 'ominous' sign, was found to have had an 'irregular heart reading'.

== Death ==
After his first and only winless season at six, Shogun Lodge won the City Tatt's Lightning Handicap first-up as a seven-year-old (coincidentally, over the same course as his debut win, five years earlier), and was sent to Flemington for two further races. In the early stages of the second of these races, the Emirates Stakes, Shogun Lodge suffered a fatal heart attack. His upset trainer, Bob Thomsen, said 'Oh God... I've probably handled the best horse this country's ever had. The best horse ever to put his head through a bridle was Tulloch and I handled him... his heart weighed 14-and-a-half (pounds)... I'll tell you what, Shogun wasn't far behind him...'

== Race record ==
1998–99 season as a two-year-old
Result	Date	Race	Venue	Group	Distance	Weight (kg)	Jockey	Winner/2nd
Won	3 Oct 1998	Canonbury Stakes	Randwick	LR	1000 m	53	J. Marshall	2nd - Passmore
4th	13 Feb 1999	Silver Slipper Stakes	Rosehill	G2	1100 m	55.5	J. Marshall	1st - Passmore
Won	6 Mar 1999	Skyline Stakes	Rosehill	G3	1200 m	55.5	S. Dye	2nd - High Rolling
Won	20 Mar 1999	Pago Pago Stakes	Rosehill	G2	1200 m	55.5	J. Marshall	2nd - High Rolling
3rd	27 Mar 1999	Golden Slipper	Rosehill	G1	1200 m	55.5	J. Marshall	1st - Catbird
5th	5 Apr 1999	Sires Produce Stakes	Randwick	G1	1400 m	55.5	S. Dye	1st - Align
3rd	17 Apr 1999	Champagne Stakes	Randwick	G1	1600 m	55.5	S. Dye	1st - Quick Star

1999–2000 season as a three-year-old
Result	Date	Race	Venue	Group	Distance	Weight (kg)	Jockey	Winner/2nd
4th	7 Aug 1999	San Domenico Stakes	Randwick	G2	1000 m	55	S. Dye	1st - Testa Rossa
4th	21 Aug 1999	Up and Coming Stakes	Warwick Farm	G2	1200 m	54	S. Dye	1st - Testa Rossa
3rd	4 Sep 1999	Ming Dynasty Quality	Randwick	LR	1400 m	58.5	S. Dye	1st - Hire
Won	16 Sep 1999	Spring Stakes	Newcastle	G3	1600 m	54	S. Dye	2nd - Perfect Paradise
Won	25 Sep 1999	George Main Stakes	Randwick	G1	1600 m	49.5	S. Dye	2nd - Sunline
2nd	2 Oct 1999	Spring Champion Stakes	Randwick	G1	2000 m	55.5	S. Dye	1st - Fairway
4th	16 Oct 1999	Norman Robinson Stakes	Caulfield	G3	2000 m	57.5	S. Dye	1st - Blackfriars
2nd	30 Oct 1999	Victoria Derby	Flemington	G1	2500 m	55.5	S. Dye	1st - Blackfriars
5th	26 Feb 2000	Royal Sovereign Stakes	Randwick	G2	1200 m	57.5	S. Dye	1st - Hire
4th	11 Mar 2000	Hobartville Stakes	Warwick Farm	G2	1400 m	55.5	S. Dye	1st - Fairway
6th	25 Mar 2000	Canterbury Guineas	Canterbury	G1	1900 m	55.5	S. Dye	1st - Fairway
Won	15 Apr 2000	Tulloch Stakes	Rosehill	G2	2000 m	55.5	S. Dye	2nd - Now Voyager
2nd	22 Apr 2000	Australian Derby	Randwick	G1	2400 m	55.5	S. Dye	1st - Fairway
5th	6 May 2000	Queen Elizabeth Stakes	Randwick	G1	2000 m	55.5	S. Dye	1st - Georgie Boy
Won	17 May 2000	A D Hollindale Stakes	Gold Coast	G2	1800 m	55.5	S. Dye	2nd - Integrate

2000–01 season as a four-year-old
Result	Date	Race	Venue	Group	Distance	Weight (kg)	Jockey	Winner/2nd
3rd	9 Sep 2000	Theo Marks Stakes	Rosehill	G2	1300 m	55.5	D. Beasley	1st - Hire
5th	23 Sep 2000	George Main Stakes	Randwick	G1	1600 m	57.5	D. Oliver	1st - Adam
Won	2 Oct 2000	Epsom Handicap	Randwick	G1	1600 m	56	G. Boss	2nd - Landsighting
2nd	14 Oct 2000	Yalumba Stakes	Caulfield	G1	2000 m	57	D. Oliver	1st - Sky Heights
11th	28 Oct 2000	Cox Plate	Moonee Valley	G1	2040 m	56.5	D. Oliver	1st - Sunline
5th	2 Dec 2000	Festival Stakes	Rosehill	LR	1300 m	59	G. Boss	1st - Adam
8th	17 Dec 2000	Hong Kong Cup	Sha Tin	G1	2000 m	57	S. Dye	1st - Fantastic Light
Won	17 Mar 2001	Canterbury Stakes	Canterbury	G2	1200 m	57.5	G. Boss	2nd - Assertive Lad
2nd	31 Mar 2001	George Ryder Stakes	Rosehill	Won	1500 m	58	G. Boss	1st - Landsighting
2nd	14 Apr 2001	Doncaster Handicap	Randwick	Won	1600 m	58	G. Boss	1st - Assertive Lad
Won	28 Apr 2001	Queen Elizabeth Stakes	Randwick	Won	2000 m	58	G. Boss	2nd - Go Flash Go
Won	16 May 2001	A D Hollindale Stakes	Gold Coast	G2	1800 m	58	G. Boss	2nd - Camarena
2nd	26 May 2001	Doomben Cup	Doomben	Won	2020 m	58	G. Boss	1st - King Keitel

2001–02 season as a five-year-old
Result	Date	Race	Venue	Group	Distance	Weight (kg)	Jockey	Winner/2nd
3rd	18 Aug 2001	Warwick Stakes	Warwick Farm	G2	1300 m	58	G. Boss	1st - Lonhro
Won	8 Sep 2001	Theo Marks Stakes	Rosehill	G2	1300 m	60	G. Boss	2nd - Fouardee
2nd	22 Sep 2001	George Main Stakes	Warwick Farm	G1	1600 m	58	G. Boss	1st - Viscount
2nd	13 Oct 2001	Yalumba Stakes	Caulfield	G1	2000 m	58	G. Boss	1st - Northerly
7th	1 Dec 2001	Festival Stakes	Rosehill	LR	1400 m	60	D. Beadman	1st - Nanny Maroon
5th	16 Dec 2001	Hong Kong Mile	Sha Tin	G1	1600 m	57	S. Dye	1st - Eishin Preston
3rd	2 Mar 2002	Canterbury Stakes	Canterbury	G2	1200 m	57.5	G. Boss	1st - Empire
2nd	16 Mar 2002	George Ryder Stakes	Rosehill	G1	1500 m	58	G. Boss	1st - Lord Essex
2nd	30 Mar 2002	Doncaster Handicap	Randwick	G1	1600 m	58	G. Boss	1st - Sunline
12th	13 Apr 2002	Queen Elizabeth Stakes	Randwick	G1	2000 m	58	G. Boss	1st - Defier

2002–03 season as a six-year-old
Result	Date	Race	Venue	Group	Distance	Weight (kg)	Jockey	Winner/2nd
3rd	17 Aug 2002	Premiere Stakes	Rosehill	G2	1200 m	57.5	P. Payne	1st - Century Kid
4th	7 Sep 2002	Chelmsford Stakes	Randwick	G2	1600 m	58	C. Brown	1st - Lonhro
5th	28 Sep 2002	George Main Stakes	Randwick	G1	1600 m	58	C. Brown	1st - Defier
9th	5 Oct 2002	Epsom Handicap	Randwick	G1	1600 m	58	G. Boss	1st - Excellerator
4th	1 Mar 2003	Frederick Clissold Stakes	Rosehill	G3	1200 m	60	H. Bowman	1st - Gordo
2nd	15 Mar 2003	Chipping Norton Stakes	Warwick Farm	G1	1600 m	58	H. Bowman	1st - Lonhro
6th	5 Apr 2003	George Ryder Stakes	Rosehill	G1	1500 m	58	H. Bowman	1st - Lonhro
7th	26 Apr 2003	All Aged Stakes	Randwick	G1	1600 m	58	P. Payne	1st - Arlington Road
6th	10 May 2003	A D Hollindale Stakes	Gold Coast	G2	1800 m	58	S. Seamer	1st - Bush Padre
7th	24 May 2003	Doomben Cup	Doomben	G1	2200 m	58	S. Seamer	1st - Bush Padre

2003–04 season as a seven-year-old
Result	Date	Race	Venue	Group	Distance	Weight (kg)	Jockey	Winner/2nd
Won	18 Oct 2003	City Tattersalls Lightning Hcp	Randwick	LR	1000 m	61	R. Quinn	2nd - Marchioness
3rd	1 Nov 2003	Yallambee Stud Stakes	Flemington	G3	1400 m	58.5	G. Boss	1st - Scenic Peak
Died	8 Nov 2003	Emirates Stakes	Flemington	G1	1600 m	56.5	G. Boss	1st - Titanic Jack

== Pedigree ==
Pedigree of Shogun Lodge (Aus)
Sire Grand Lodge (USA) 1991	Chief's Crown (USA); 1982	Danzig (USA); 1977	Northern Dancer (Can)
Sire Grand Lodge (USA) 1991	Chief's Crown (USA); 1982	Danzig (USA); 1977	Pas de Nom (USA)
Sire Grand Lodge (USA) 1991	Chief's Crown (USA); 1982	Six Crowns (USA); 1976	Secretariat (USA)
Sire Grand Lodge (USA) 1991	Chief's Crown (USA); 1982	Six Crowns (USA); 1976	Chris Evert (USA)
Sire Grand Lodge (USA) 1991	La Papagena (GB); 1983	Habitat (USA); 1966	Sir Gaylord (USA)
Sire Grand Lodge (USA) 1991	La Papagena (GB); 1983	Habitat (USA); 1966	Little Hut (USA)
Sire Grand Lodge (USA) 1991	La Papagena (GB); 1983	Magic Flute (GB); 1968	Tudor Melody (GB)
Sire Grand Lodge (USA) 1991	La Papagena (GB); 1983	Magic Flute (GB); 1968	Filigrana (GB)
Dam Pride of Tahnee (Aus) 1984	Best Western (Aus); 1978	Bletchingly (Aus); 1970	Biscay (Aus)
Dam Pride of Tahnee (Aus) 1984	Best Western (Aus); 1978	Bletchingly (Aus); 1970	Coogee (GB)
Dam Pride of Tahnee (Aus) 1984	Best Western (Aus); 1978	Grease Paint (Aus); 1970	Raimondo (Fr)
Dam Pride of Tahnee (Aus) 1984	Best Western (Aus); 1978	Grease Paint (Aus); 1970	Better Half (Aus)
Dam Pride of Tahnee (Aus) 1984	Tahnee's Pride (Aus); 1979	Boucher (USA); 1969	Ribot (GB)
Dam Pride of Tahnee (Aus) 1984	Tahnee's Pride (Aus); 1979	Boucher (USA); 1969	Glamour (USA)
Dam Pride of Tahnee (Aus) 1984	Tahnee's Pride (Aus); 1979	Swiftly Ann (Aus); 1972	Swiftly Morgan (USA)
Dam Pride of Tahnee (Aus) 1984	Tahnee's Pride (Aus); 1979	Swiftly Ann (Aus); 1972	Dulcieann (Aus)
