= Breeders Classic =

Breeders Classic raced as Hot Danish Stakes
- Class: Group 2
- Location: Rosehill Racecourse
- Inaugurated: 1996
- Race type: Thoroughbred - flat
- Sponsor: Toyota Forklifts (2026)

Race information
- Distance: 1,400 metres
- Surface: Turf
- Track: Right-handed
- Qualification: Three year old and older mares
- Weight: Set weights with penalties
- Purse: A$500,000 (2026)

The Breeders Classic, raced as the Hot Danish Stakes is an Australian Turf Club Group 2 Thoroughbred horse race, for mares three-years old and upwards, at set weights with penalties, over a distance of 1400 metres run at Rosehill Racecourse in Sydney, Australia every November.

== History ==
The event was moved for the 2019–20 racing season to November as part of The Everest carnival and hence the event was held twice in 2019.

=== Distance ===
- 1996 – 1200 metres
- 1997 – 1250 metres
- 1998 – 1300 metres
- 1999–2003 – 1200 metres
- 2004 – 1180 metres
- 2005–2019 (Autumn) - 1200 metres
- 2019 (Spring) - 1400 metres

=== Grade ===
- 1996–2005 - Listed race
- 2006–2007 - Group 3
- 2008 onwards - Group 2

=== Venue ===
- 1996–2001 - Randwick Racecourse
- 2002 - Warwick Farm Racecourse
- 2003–2011 - Randwick Racecourse
- 2012 - Warwick Farm Racecourse
- 2013–2016 - Rosehill Gardens Racecourse
- 2017 - Randwick Racecourse
- 2018–2019 (Autumn) - Warwick Farm Racecourse
- 2019 (Spring) - Rosehill Gardens Racecourse

== Winners ==
The following are past winners of the race.

- 2026 - Lazzura
- 2025 - Arctic Glamour
- 2024 - Belclare
- 2023 - Roots
- 2022 - Sheeza Belter
- 2021 - Electric Girl
- 2020 - Savatiano
- 2019 (spring) - Reelem In Ruby
- 2019 (autumn) - Champagne Cuddles
- 2018 - Prompt Response
- 2017 - In Her Time
- 2016 - Amicus
- 2015 - Catkins
- 2014 - Catkins
- 2013 - Steps In Time
- 2012 - Steps In Time
- 2011 - More Joyous
- 2010 - Alverta
- 2009 - Hot Danish
- 2008 - Gallant Tess
- 2007 - Pasikatera
- 2006 - Steflara
- 2005 - Winning Belle
- 2004 - Private Steer
- 2003 - Miss Helterskelter
- 2002 - Gwendolyn
- 2001 - Spinning Hill
- 2000 - Staging
- 1999 - My Halo Broke
- 1998 - Arletty
- 1997 - Misty Dawn
- 1996 - Destruct

== See also ==
- List of Australian Group races
- Group races
