= Ming Dynasty Quality Handicap =

- Class: Group 3
- Location: Rosehill Gardens Racecourse, Sydney, Australia
- Inaugurated: 1986
- Race type: Thoroughbred - flat
- Sponsor: Myplates (2026)

Race information
- Distance: 1,400 metres
- Surface: Turf
- Track: Right-handed
- Qualification: Three year olds
- Weight: Quality handicap
- Purse: A$250,000 (2026)

The Ming Dynasty Quality Handicap is an Australian Turf Club Group 3 Thoroughbred quality handicap horse race for three-year-olds, over a distance of 1400 metres at Rosehill Gardens Racecourse, Sydney, Australia.

== History ==
The race is named in honour of Ming Dynasty who won the Caulfield Cup and Australian Cup twice as well as the Chelmsford Stakes.

=== Name ===
- 1986–1992 - D. Drainsfield Quality Handicap
- 1993 - Laing & Simmons Quality Handicap
- 1994 - Ming Dynasty Quality Handicap

=== Grade ===
- 1986–2012 - Listed Race
- 2000–2004 - Group 3
- 2005–2012 - Listed Race
- 2013 onwards - Group 3

=== Venue ===
- 1986–1999 - Randwick
- 2000 - Rosehill
- 2001–2003 - Randwick
- 2004 - Warwick Farm
- 2005–2010 - Randwick
- 2011–2012 - Warwick Farm
- 2013–2016 - Randwick
- 2017–2020 - Rosehill
- 2021 - Kembla Grange Racecourse
- 2022 - Rosehill

=== Distance ===
- 1986–1994 – 1600 metres
- 1995–1999 – 1400 metres
- 2000 - 1350 metres
- 2001 onwards - 1400 metres

== Winners ==
The following are past winners of the race.

- 2026 - Persian Wonder
- 2025 - Sixties
- 2024 - Lady Shenandoah
- 2023 - Encap
- 2022 - Golden Mile
- 2021 - Coastwatch
- 2020 - Holyfield
- 2019 - Quick Thinker
- 2018 - Danawi
- 2017 - Addictive Nature
- 2016 - Swear
- 2015 - Metallic Crown
- 2014 - Panzer Division
- 2013 - Aussies Love Sport
- 2012 - Tatra
- 2011 - Ambidexter
- 2010 - Lion Tamer
- 2009 - More Than Great
- 2008 - Predatory Pricer
- 2007 - †race not held
- 2006 - Mearas
- 2005 - Primus
- 2004 - Dane Shadow
- 2003 - Play Around
- 2002 - Half Hennessy
- 2001 - Lonhro
- 2000 - Continuum
- 1999 - Hire
- 1998 - Kenwood Melody
- 1997 - Adam
- 1996 - Magic Of Sydney
- 1995 - Follow Through
- 1994 - Obsessed
- 1993 - Matrinaman
- 1992 - Muirfield Village
- 1991 - Kinjite
- 1990 - What A Hit
- 1989 - Cool Credit
- 1988 - Royal Pardon
- 1987 - Nickson
- 1986 - Imperial Majesty

† Not held because of outbreak of equine influenza

== See also ==
- Sheraco Stakes
- The Run To The Rose
- Theo Marks Stakes
- List of Australian Group races
- Group races
