= Canonbury Stakes =

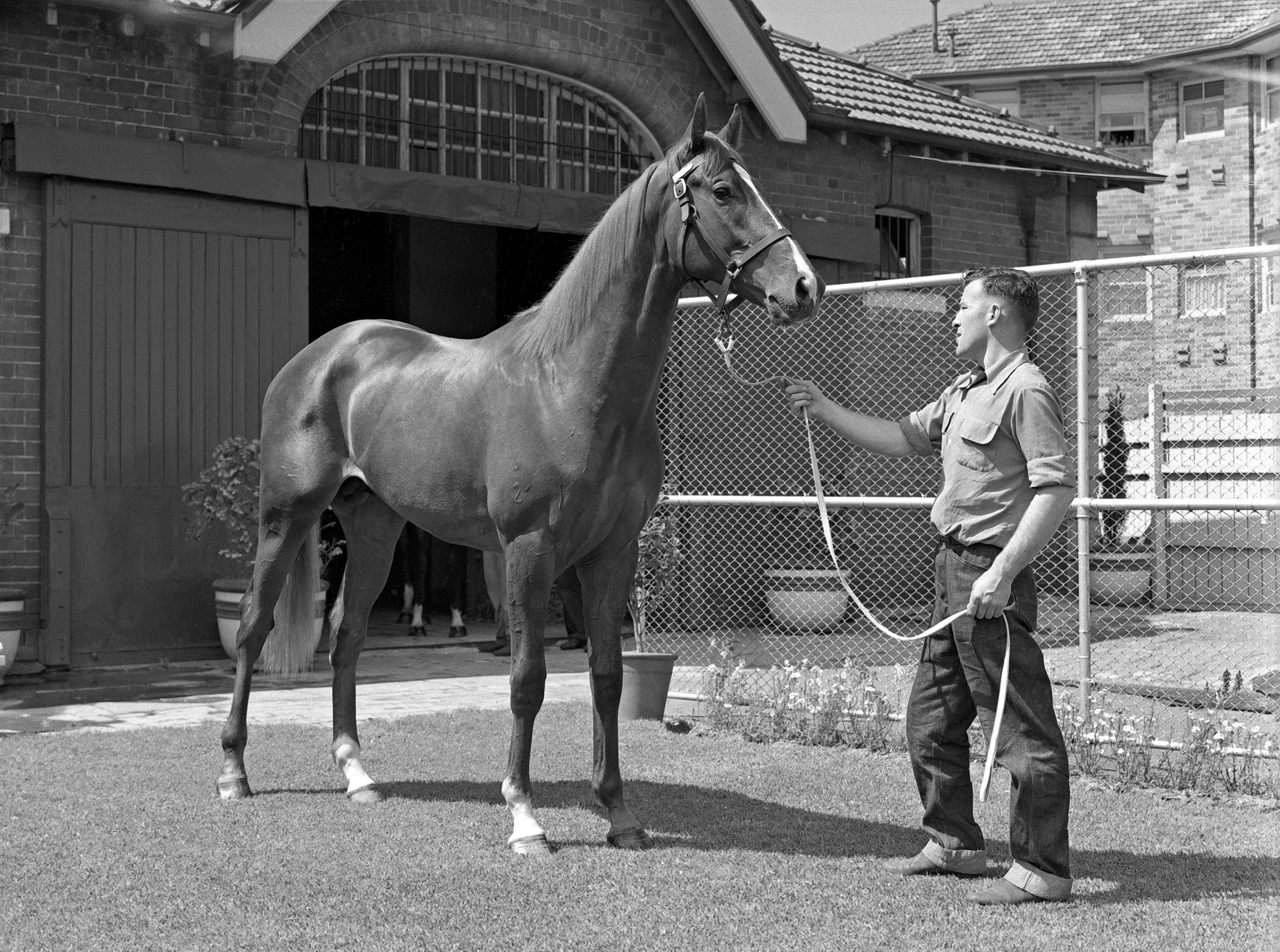
- Aboukir, 1954 winner
- Class: Group 3
- Location: Rosehill Racecourse
- Inaugurated: 1930
- Race type: Thoroughbred - flat

Race information
- Distance: 1,100 metres
- Surface: Turf
- Track: Right-handed
- Qualification: Two year old colts and geldings
- Weight: Set weights with penalties
- Purse: A$250,000 (2025)

The Canonbury Stakes is an Australian Turf Club Group 3 Thoroughbred horse race, for two-year-old colts and geldings, held with set weights with penalties conditions, over a distance of 1100 metres at Rosehill Racecourse in Sydney, Australia in February.

== History ==
=== Name ===
The race is named after the name of the house Canonbury, which was built in 1911 by Harry Rickards near Darling Point in Sydney. After his death the house was sold to the Australian Jockey Club in 1919 and was used as a convalescent hospital for returned servicemen from World War I.

The race was originally held earlier in the racing season as an open two-year-old event but was moved for the 2007–2008 season to February as a colts and geldings event. Since 2008, the two-year-old fillies event, the Widden Stakes is held on the same racecard.

Three colts have captured the Canonbury Stakes – Golden Slipper Stakes double:
Fine and Dandy (1958), Sebring (2007) and Vancouver (2015)

=== Distance ===
- 1930–1972 - 5 furlongs (~1000 metres)
- 1973–2003 – 1000 metres
- 2004–2006 – 1100 metres
- 2008 – 1000 metres
- 2009 onwards - 1100 metres

=== Grade ===
- 1930–1978 - Principal Race
- 1979–2014 - Listed Race
- 2015 onwards - Group 3

=== Venue ===
- 1930–2003 - Randwick Racecourse
- 2004–2006 - Rosehill Gardens Racecourse
- 2008–2011 - Randwick Racecourse
- 2012 - Warwick Farm Racecourse
- 2013–2019 - Rosehill Gardens Racecourse
- 2020 - Randwick Racecourse
- 2021 onwards - Rosehill Gardens Racecourse

== Winners ==
Past winners of the race are as follows.

- 2026 - Hidrix
- 2025 - Blitzburg
- 2024 - Prost
- 2023 - Red Resistance
- 2022 - Best Of Bordeaux
- 2021 - Zethus
- 2020 - Prague
- 2019 - McLaren
- 2018 - Performer
- 2017 - Pariah
- 2016 - Tessera
- 2015 - Vancouver
- 2014 - Fighting Sun
- 2013 - Never Can Tell
- 2012 - Raceway
- 2011 - Diamond To Pegasus
- 2010 - Hinchinbrook
- 2009 - Tickets
- 2008 - Sebring
- 2007 - race not held
- 2006 - Danehill Smile
- 2005 - Diego Garcia
- 2004 - Bradbury's Luck
- 2003 - Not A Single Doubt
- 2002 - Hammerbeam
- 2001 - Snowland
- 2000 - Excellerator
- 1999 - Kootoomootoo
- 1998 - Shogun Lodge
- 1997 - Brilliance
- 1996 - Hockney
- 1995 - The Oscars
- 1994 - Vernal
- 1993 - Dapper Magic
- 1992 - Jetball
- 1991 - Knight's Tale
- 1990 - Trooping
- 1989 - White Crest
- 1988 - Silver Appeal
- 1987 - Iga Ninja
- 1986 - Mardi Gras
- 1985 - The Barossa
- 1984 - Asarka
- 1983 - Kingston Jamaica
- 1982 - Been There
- 1981 - Golconda D'Or
- 1980 - Young Willie
- 1979 - Massacre
- 1978 - Mersing
- 1977 - Just A Steal
- 1976 - Flirting Prince
- 1975 - Timurkhan
- 1974 - †Dizzy Spell / Ortillo
- 1973 - Suggest
- 1972 - Jolly Peter
- 1971 - Radameson
- 1970 - Campanello
- 1969 - Prince O'Jazz
- 1968 - Star Rise
- 1967 - Slippery
- 1966 - Constellation
- 1965 - Later On
- 1964 - Cassius
- 1963 - Son Of Tod
- 1962 - Time And Tide
- 1961 - Bogan Road
- 1960 - Pan Shah
- 1959 - Hydrell
- 1958 - Fine And Dandy
- 1957 - †Gabonia / Meerut
- 1956 - Tulloch
- 1955 - My Kingdom
- 1954 - Aboukir
- 1953 - Indian Empire
- 1952 - Grand Vite
- 1951 - Royal Eagle
- 1950 - Fengari
- 1949 - Navigate
- 1948 - Aqua Regis
- 1947 - Heliofly
- 1946 - Deep Sea
- 1945 - Vigaro
- 1944 - Tactician
- 1943 - Majesty
- 1942 - race not held
- 1941 - Baroda
- 1940 - Mannerheim
- 1939 - Victorine
- 1938 - Rival Chief
- 1937 - Homily
- 1936 - Theolos
- 1935 - Law King
- 1934 - †Golden Promise / Buller
- 1933 - Pasha
- 1932 - Burlesque
- 1931 - Apparel
- 1930 - Lightning March

† Run in divisions

== See also ==
- List of Australian Group races
- Group races
