= Emancipation Stakes =

- Class: Group 2
- Location: Rosehill Gardens Racecourse, Sydney
- Inaugurated: 1985
- Race type: Thoroughbred
- Sponsor: Schweppes (2026)

Race information
- Distance: 1,500 metres
- Surface: Turf
- Track: Right-handed
- Qualification: Fillies and mares three years old and older
- Weight: Set weights with penalties
- Purse: $300,000 (2026)
- Bonuses: Exempt from ballot in Queen of the Turf Stakes

The Emancipation Stakes is an Australian Turf Club Group 2 Thoroughbred horse race, for fillies and mares aged three years old and older, over a distance of 1500 metres at Rosehill Gardens Racecourse.

== History ==
The race is named in honour of the former champion mare Emancipation.

The inaugural running of the race was as the third race on Easter Monday AJC Autumn Carnival racecard in 1985 with Aspirations winning.

The record time for the race, when run over 1600m, was set by Fantasia in 2006 in a time of 1:34.52. Since the race was reduced to 1500m the fastest time is 1:28.43 set by Zanbagh in 2016.

Jockey Shane Dye has ridden the most winners with six.

=== Grade ===
- 1985–1994 – Listed race
- 1995–1998 – Group 3
- 1999 onwards – Group 2

=== Distance ===
- 1985–2013 – 1600 metres
- 2014 onwards – 1500 metres

=== Venue ===
- 1985–2013 – Randwick Racecourse
- 2014–2021 – Rosehill Gardens Racecourse
- 2022 – Newcastle Racecourse
- 2023 onwards – Rosehill Gardens Racecourse

== Winners ==
The following are past winners of the race.

- 2026 - Idle Flyer
- 2025 - Lekvarte
- 2024 - Olentia
- 2023 - Roots
- 2022 - Promise Of Success
- 2021 - Nimalee
- 2020 – Positive Peace
- 2019 – Invincible Gem
- 2018 – Prompt Response
- 2017 – Zanbagh
- 2016 – Zanbagh
- 2015 – Catkins
- 2014 – Catkins
- 2013 – Skyerush
- 2012 – Skyerush
- 2011 – Sworn to Secrecy
- 2010 – Sacred Choice
- 2009 – Amberino
- 2008 – Kosi Bay
- 2007 – Hot Danish
- 2006 – Fantasia
- 2005 – Perfect Promise
- 2004 – Hec of a Party
- 2003 – Faith Hill
- 2002 – Miss Zoe
- 2001 – Heather
- 2000 – Beat The Fade
- 1999 – Staging
- 1998 – Palia
- 1997 – Almazyoon
- 1996 – Star County
- 1995 – Vital Consent
- 1994 – Ausmart
- 1993 – Hysterical
- 1992 – Romanee Conti
- 1991 – Ice Cream Sundae
- 1990 – Top Dance
- 1989 – Twining
- 1988 – Balmoral
- 1987 – Clavell's Girl
- 1986 – Sea Pictures
- 1985 – Aspirations

== See also ==
- T L Baillieu Handicap
- Doncaster Prelude
- Neville Sellwood Stakes
- Star Kingdom Stakes
- H E Tancred Stakes
- Tulloch Stakes
- Vinery Stud Stakes
- List of Australian Group races
- Group races
