= Wayne Slattery =

Wayne Slattery may refer to:

- Wayne Slattery (footballer)
- Wayne Slattery (equestrian)
