= Exosphere (horse) =

Australian-bred Thoroughbred racehorse

- Racing silks of Godolphin
- Sire: Lonhro
- Grandsire: Octagonal
- Dam: Altitude
- Damsire: Danzero
- Sex: Stallion
- Foaled: 25 August 2012
- Died: 14 August 2024 (aged 11)
- Country: Australia
- Colour: Bay
- Breeder: Godolphin
- Owner: Godolphin
- Trainer: John O'Shea
- Record: 10-5-0-0
- Earnings: A$1,091,600

Major wins
- Skyline Stakes (G2)(2015); The Run to the Rose (G2)(2015); Golden Rose (G1)(2015); Roman Consul Stakes (G2)(2015)

Exosphere (25 August 2012 - 14 August 2024) was a retired Thoroughbred racehorse trained and bred in Australia. He won the Golden Rose Stakes, a Group one race, and accumulated over a million dollars in winnings. He was his known for large size. and for being a successful breeding stallion.

== Career ==
Exosphere had his first race on 1 November 2014 at Rosehill. Despite entering the race as odds-on favourite, he finished last after over-racing in the lead. The vet said he was distressed after the race.

On 14 February 2015, Exosphere won his first race, leading by 4 lengths in the 1000m race at Kembla Grange. A fortnight later, Exosphere won the Group 2 Skyline Stakes at Warwick Farm. The Sydney Morning Herald said he "panelled his rivals. He got back in the field and worked his way to the centre of the track before unleashing a sprint that had the race settled in a matter of strides.

Entering the Golden Slipper as second favourite, Exosphere finished last of a field of 16. A post-race examination by the vet revealed he had been suffering from heart arrhythmia, and was immediately spelled.

After two trials, Exosphere returned in the Group 2 The Run to the Rose in August. Last of a small field of 5 at the turn, Exosphere won easily. Jockey Sam Clipperton, who was covering for the suspended James McDonald, said, "He is a serious horse. Once I got him out to the centre he sprinted really quickly and had them covered."

Two weeks later, Exosphere was "dominant" in the Golden Rose, winning his first Group 1 event by 2 lengths. Trainer John O'Shea said, "He's some colt. Wait until he grows into his frame. He is by this great sire Lonhro and he is in for a great season. A horse like Exosphere has great international appeal and you never know where he is going to end up."

Exosphere's next race was the Roman Consul Stakes. Entering the straight 10 lengths behind the leader, he won by 3 lengths, breaking the race record by over half a second. Exosphere had one more race, where he failed to place, before being spelled.

"He's a lot like his dad, Lonhro. He's got a presence about him. He's a very casual, laconic type of horse and really saves his energy for the time that it's needed on track And when you release the brakes on him you can see that quality there."

— −Darren Beadman

Returning in February 2016, Exosphere contested the Black Caviar Lightning. With the 1000m race running down the Flemington straight, the field split into two groups, with Exosphere in the slower part of the track. "He jumped left and by the time he looked up and realised the chances had gone to the other side and it was game over. I'd say there was probably a two to four length disparity between the inside and the outside at Flemington yesterday," said O'Shea. Exosphere finished fourth.

After freshening, Exosphere contested the T J Smith Stakes, finishing 9 lengths behind winner Chautauqua. Jockey James Mcdonald noted, "I got him out and he just did nothing." He was subsequently retired to stud, with Godolphn director Henry Plumptre saying, "Exosphere retires with an extraordinary race record. Because of his unusual size and bulk, he had training issues, but he managed to put together a string of outstanding performances He is an exciting stallion of the future. No fee has yet been set, but we expect him to be popular."

== Stud career ==
His stud fee in 2018 was $22,000, with two of his yearlings selling for over $200,000 in early 2019.

Exosphere had a winner from his first crop when colt Thermosphere won first at Newcastle on 27 February 2020, and then the Group 3 Magic Night Stakes a fortnight later. From the same crop, Thermosphere won the Group 3 Magic Night Stakes and the Group 2 Edward Manifold Stakes.

In 2021, his fee was down to $4950. Offspring Exoboom won the Group 3 Hawkesbury Guineas.

In 2024 Exosphere died from complications arising from colic surgery whilst performing stallion duties at Oaklands Stud in Queensland.

=== Notable progeny ===
c = colt, f = filly, g = gelding

Foaled	Name	Sex	Major wins
2020	Headley Grange	g	Kingsford-Smith Cup
2020	Skybird	f	Black Caviar Lightning
