= Skyline Stakes =

- Class: Group 2
- Location: Randwick Racecourse, Sydney, Australia
- Inaugurated: 1979
- Race type: Thoroughbred - flat
- Sponsor: Catanach's Jewellers (2024 & 2025)

Race information
- Distance: 1,200 metres
- Surface: Turf
- Track: Right-handed
- Qualification: Two year old colts and geldings
- Weight: Set weights 55 1/2 kg
- Purse: A$300,000 (2025)
- Bonuses: Automatic entry to the Golden Slipper Stakes

The Skyline Stakes is an Australian Turf Club Group 2 Thoroughbred horse race for colts and geldings aged two years old, at set weights, over a distance of 1,200 metres. It is held annually at Randwick Racecourse in Sydney, Australia in late February or early March.

The winner of this race receives automatic entry to the Golden Slipper Stakes

== History ==
The race is named in honour of Skyline, winner of the 1958 Golden Slipper Stakes and 1958 AJC Australian Derby.

The following thoroughbreds have completed the Skyline – Golden Slipper double:

- Sir Dapper (1983)
- Star Watch (1988)
- Guineas (1997)
- Prowl (1998)
- Dance Hero (2004)

Jim Cassidy was the winning rider in 2006, 2007 and 2012.

=== Venue ===
- Before 1995 - Canterbury Park Racecourse
- 1996–1999 - Rosehill Gardens Racecourse
- 2000–2005 - Canterbury Park Racecourse
- 2006–2010 - Randwick Racecourse
- 2011 - Warwick Farm Racecourse
- 2012 - Randwick Racecourse
- 2013 - Warwick Farm Racecourse
- 2014 - Randwick Racecourse
- 2015 - Warwick Farm Racecourse
- 2016 onwards - Randwick Racecourse

=== Grade ===
- 1979 - Principal Race
- 1980–1986 - Listed Race
- 1987–2012 - Group 3
- 2013 onwards - Group 2

== Winners ==
The following are past winners of the race.

- 2026 - Camione D'italia
- 2025 - Rivellino
- 2024 - Storm Boy
- 2023 - Corniche
- 2022 - Promitto
- 2021 - O'President
- 2020 - Mamaragan
- 2019 - Microphone
- 2018 - Santos
- 2017 - Diamond Tathagata
- 2016 - Good Standing
- 2015 - Exosphere
- 2014 - Valentia
- 2013 - All The Talk
- 2012 - Ashokan
- 2011 - Uate
- 2010 - Hinchinbrook
- 2009 - Manhattan Rain
- 2008 - All American
- 2007 - Murtajill
- 2006 - Casino Prince
- 2005 - Snitzel
- 2004 - Dance Hero
- 2003 - Kusi
- 2002 - Choisir
- 2001 - Viscount
- 2000 - Kootoomootoo
- 1999 - Shogun Lodge
- 1998 - Prowl
- 1997 - Guineas
- 1996 - Excel Pilot
- 1995 - Strategic
- 1994 - Dr. Zackary
- 1993 - Allez Glen
- 1992 - Kenfair
- 1991 - Big Dreams
- 1990 - Our Horizon
- 1989 - Show County
- 1988 - Star Watch
- 1987 - Proven Valour
- 1986 - Pre Catelan
- 1985 - Timothy
- 1984 - Hula Drum
- 1983 - Sir Dapper
- 1982 - Hot Opera
- 1981 - Domino
- 1980 - Cosmic Delight
- 1979 - Top Hat Joe

== See also ==
- List of Australian Group races
- Group races
