= T L Baillieu Handicap =

The T L Baillieu Handicap
- Class: Group 3
- Location: Rosehill Gardens Racecourse; Sydney, New South Wales
- Inaugurated: 1986
- Race type: Thoroughbred – Flat racing
- Sponsor: Drinkwise (2026)

Race information
- Distance: 1,400 metres
- Surface: Turf
- Track: Right-handed
- Qualification: Two-year-olds
- Weight: Quality Handicap
- Purse: $250,000 (2026)

T L Baillieu Handicap, is an Australian Turf Club Group 3 Thoroughbred quality handicap horse race, for two-year-olds, over a distance of 1400 metres, held annually at Rosehill Racecourse in Sydney, Australia.

== History ==
The registered race is named in honour of the former Australian Jockey Club Chairman Tom Latham Baillieu (elected in 1947). The race was initially part of the AJC Autumn Carnival and raced at Randwick and later at Warwick Farm.

=== Name ===
- 1986–2002: T L Baillieu Handicap
- 2003–2005: T L Baillieu Quality Handicap
- 2006–2009: T L Baillieu Handicap
- 2010–2022: The Schweppervescence
- 2023 onwards: T L Baillieu Handicap

=== Grade ===
- 1986–2010: Listed Race
- 2011 onwards: Group 3

=== Venue ===
- 1986–1998: Randwick Racecourse
- 1999–2000: Warwick Farm Racecourse
- 2001: Randwick Kensington (inner all weather track)
- 2002–2007: Warwick Farm Racecourse
- 2008–2009: Randwick Racecourse Kensington (inner all weather track)
- 2010 onwards: Rosehill Racecourse

== Winners ==
The following are past winners of the race.

- 2026: Southend
- 2025: Nepotism
- 2024: Linebacker
- 2023: Amur
- 2022: Williamsburg
- 2021: Saif
- 2020: Holyfield
- 2019: Bellevue Hill
- 2018: Irukandji
- 2017: The Mission
- 2016: Attention
- 2015: Takedown
- 2014: Bachman
- 2013: Champollion
- 2012: Flying Snitzel
- 2011: Do You Think
- 2010: Skilled
- 2009: Onemorenomore
- 2008: Rhyno Chaser
- 2007: Pistols
- 2006: Mentality
- 2005: Paratroopers
- 2004: Gaze On
- 2003: Winning Belle
- 2002: Redwood Falls
- 2001: Vita
- 2000: Clonmel
- 1999: Citirecruit
- 1998: Danske
- 1997: Key Issue
- 1996: Bolster
- 1995: Latin Quarter
- 1994: Talaga
- 1993: Santiago Belle
- 1992: Quegent
- 1991: French Prince
- 1990: Shot Of Comfort
- 1989: Select Prince
- 1988: Bayonette
- 1987: All Ashore
- 1986: Western Ace

== See also ==
- Doncaster Prelude
- Emancipation Stakes
- Neville Sellwood Stakes
- Star Kingdom Stakes
- H E Tancred Stakes
- Tulloch Stakes
- Vinery Stud Stakes
- List of Australian Group races
- Group races
