= Doncaster Prelude =

Doncaster Prelude registered as Royal Parma Stakes
- Class: Group 3
- Location: Rosehill Gardens Racecourse; Sydney, New South Wales
- Inaugurated: 1985
- Race type: Thoroughbred – Flat racing
- Sponsor: Racing and sports (2023-2026)

Race information
- Distance: 1,500 metres
- Surface: Turf
- Track: Right-handed
- Qualification: Three year old and older
- Weight: Quality Handicap – Minimum 54 kg
- Purse: $250,000 (2026)
- Bonuses: Exempt from ballot and penalty in the Doncaster Mile

The Doncaster Prelude, registered as Royal Parma Stakes, is an Australian Turf Club Group 3 Thoroughbred quality handicap horse race, for horses aged three years old and older, over a distance of 1500 metres, held at Rosehill Gardens Racecourse in Sydney.

== History ==
The registered race is named after champion two-year-old Royal Parma, winner of the Golden Slipper Stakes in 1968. The race was originally run at Rosehill racecourse on the Golden Slipper Stakes race meeting but after the merging of the two principal race clubs in Sydney the race was moved to a later date and now the race is a prelude to the rich Doncaster Handicap.

=== Name ===
- 1985–1991 - Royal Parma Stakes
- 1992 - Caravan Stakes
- 1993–1997 - Royal Parma Stakes
- 1998 - Concept Sports Stakes
- 1999–2004 - Royal Parma Stakes
- 2005 - Allied Express Stakes
- 2006–2009 - Royal Parma Stakes
- 2010 onwards - Doncaster Prelude

=== Distance ===
- 1985–2000 – 1500 metres
- 2001–2003 – 1400 metres
- 2004–2005 – 1500 metres
- 2006 – 1400 metres
- 2007 – 1500 metres
- 2008–2009 – 1400 metres
- 2010–2013 - 1600 metres
- 2014 onwards - 1500 metres

=== Grade ===
- 1986–2010 - Listed Race
- 2011 onwards - Group 3

=== Venue ===
- 1985–2009 - Rosehill Racecourse
- 2010–2013 - Randwick Racecourse
- 2014–2021 - Rosehill Racecourse
- 2022 - Newcastle Racecourse
- 2023 onwards - Rosehill Racecourse

== Winners ==
The following are past winners of the race.

- 2026 - Welwal
- 2025 - Just Folk
- 2024 - Another Wil
- 2023 - Bandersnatch
- 2022 - Mr Mozart
- 2021 - Yao Dash
- 2020 - Cascadian
- 2019 - Mister Sea Wolf
- 2018 - Cellarman
- 2017 - Spectroscope
- 2016 - Havana Cooler
- 2015 - Excess Knowledge
- 2014 - Weary
- 2013 - Skyerush
- 2012 - Fast Clip
- 2011 - My Kingdom Of Fife
- 2010 - Brilliant Light
- 2009 - Dao Dao
- 2008 - Valedictum
- 2007 - Mr Ubiquitous
- 2006 - Gorgonite
- 2005 - Osca Warrior
- 2004 - Allgunadoit
- 2003 - Helsinborg
- 2002 - Defier
- 2001 - Final Fantasy
- 2000 - Le Zagaletta
- 1999 - Adam
- 1998 - Corporate James
- 1997 - Ravarda
- 1996 - Buzzoff
- 1995 - Salivate
- 1994 - Cobbora
- 1993 - Blue Boss
- 1992 - Alderson
- 1991 - Livistona Lane
- 1990 - Painted Ocean
- 1989 - Card Shark
- 1988 - Tumble On
- 1987 - Eastern Classic
- 1986 - Swift Cheval
- 1985 - Bring Home

== See also ==
- T L Baillieu Handicap
- Emancipation Stakes
- Neville Sellwood Stakes
- Star Kingdom Stakes
- H E Tancred Stakes
- Tulloch Stakes
- Vinery Stud Stakes
- List of Australian Group races
- Group races
