= Quick Thinker =

Australian thoroughbred racehorse

- Racing Silks of Quick Thinker
- Sire: So You Think
- Grandsire: High Chaparral
- Dam: Acouplamas
- Damsire: Al Maher
- Sex: Colt
- Foaled: 7 September 2016
- Country: Australia
- Colour: Brown
- Breeder: Bowcock Bloodstock
- Owner: OTI Racing, D Honiss, JA & A Boyd, Cross Tasman, L & M Webb, D McKeown, Mr J JF & MG Gleeson, PK Goodwin, Centsless, Mrs DC & JM Gurrieri, CL Hall, R Koch, J Williams, Maverick Racing, Sibling Rivalry, JP Spence
- Trainer: Murray Baker & Andrew Forsman
- Record: 23: 5–3–2
- Earnings: A$ 1,246,728

Major wins
- Ming Dynasty Quality Handicap (2019); Tulloch Stakes (2020); Australian Derby (2020); Chairman's Handicap (2021)

Quick Thinker (foaled 7 September 2016) is a Group 1 winning Australian bred, New Zealand trained thoroughbred racehorse.

== Background ==
Quick Thinker was a A$100,000 Inglis Easter purchase and was bred by Bowcock Bloodstock. He is a half-brother to Group III placed The August from stakes-placed Al Maher mare Acouplamas, who comes from the family of Group I classic winners Blackfriars and Larrocha.

== Racing career ==
=== 2018/19: two-year-old season ===
Quick Thinker debuted at Rotorua Racecourse on the 12 April 2019 and finished in second placing. One week later he won his first race in the Listed Champagne Stakes at Ellerslie Racecourse. Trainer Murray Baker spoke of the horse possibly travelling to Australia as a three-year-old to contest bigger races.

=== 2019/20: three-year-old season ===
Quick Thinker travelled to Australia and raced in the Ming Dynasty Quality Handicap on the 31 August 2019 at Rosehill Racecourse. Ridden by Hugh Bowman and starting at odds of 10/1, he won the race by two lengths.

Quick Thinker's next win wasn’t until the 20 March 2020 when winning the Group 2 Tulloch Stakes. A week later he started at the odds of 7/1 in the Australian Derby at Randwick Racecourse. This would prove to be his first Group 1 victory when winning by a short head margin.

== Stud career ==
Quick Thinker stands as a stallion in Tasmania.
