= Kiamichi (horse) =

Australian Thoroughbred racehorse

- Racing silks of Godolphin
- Sire: Sidestep
- Grandsire: Exceed And Excel
- Dam: Ouachita
- Damsire: Canny Lad
- Sex: Filly
- Foaled: 23 August 2016
- Country: Australia
- Colour: Bay
- Breeder: Godolphin
- Owner: Godolphin
- Trainer: James Cummings
- Record: 13: 3–1–2
- Earnings: A$ 2,368,750

Major wins
- Magic Night Stakes (2019); Golden Slipper Stakes (2019)

Awards
- New South Wales Two Year Old of the Year (2018/19)

Kiamichi (foaled 23 August 2016) is a retired Group 1 winning Australian thoroughbred racehorse.

== Background ==
Kiamichi was sired by Sidestep, who won the Pago Pago Stakes, the Royal Sovereign Stakes and Golden Slipper Stakes. Kiamichi proved to be Sidestep's first winning progeny.

== Racing career ==
Kiamichi won her first race start at the odds of 13/2 when she was successful in a 2-year-old handicap race at Rosehill Gardens Racecourse. Her next victory came in the Magic Night Stakes at the odds of 20/1. She defied these odds to lead all the way and with that victory gained an automatic entry into the Golden Slipper Stakes, the richest two-year-old race in the world, which is run the following week.

Kiamichi was one of six runners for the Godolphin stable in the 2019 Golden Slipper and was also the least favoured of the six runners starting the race at odds of 25/1. She was ridden by Damian Lane to an all-the-way victory in the race and collected first-prize money in excess of $2 million.

Kiamichi was retired to stud as a three-year-old after failing to win any further races since the Golden Slipper.

== Pedigree ==
Pedigree of Kiamichi (AUS) 2016
Sire Sidestep (AUS) 2010	Exceed And Excel (AUS); 2000	Danehill	Danzig
Sire Sidestep (AUS) 2010	Exceed And Excel (AUS); 2000	Danehill	Razyana
Sire Sidestep (AUS) 2010	Exceed And Excel (AUS); 2000	Patrona	Lomond
Sire Sidestep (AUS) 2010	Exceed And Excel (AUS); 2000	Patrona	Gladiolus
Sire Sidestep (AUS) 2010	Dextrous (AUS); 1999	Quest For Fame	Rainbow Quest
Sire Sidestep (AUS) 2010	Dextrous (AUS); 1999	Quest For Fame	Aryenne
Sire Sidestep (AUS) 2010	Dextrous (AUS); 1999	Many Hands	Handy Proverb
Sire Sidestep (AUS) 2010	Dextrous (AUS); 1999	Many Hands	Deliberation
Dam Ouachita (AUS) 2005	Canny Lad (AUS); 1987	Bletchingly	Biscay
Dam Ouachita (AUS) 2005	Canny Lad (AUS); 1987	Bletchingly	Coogee
Dam Ouachita (AUS) 2005	Canny Lad (AUS); 1987	Jesmond Lass	Lunchtime
Dam Ouachita (AUS) 2005	Canny Lad (AUS); 1987	Jesmond Lass	Beautiful Dreamer
Dam Ouachita (AUS) 2005	Peach (AUS); 1991	Vain	Wilkes
Dam Ouachita (AUS) 2005	Peach (AUS); 1991	Vain	Elated
Dam Ouachita (AUS) 2005	Peach (AUS); 1991	Market Maid	Marscay
Dam Ouachita (AUS) 2005	Peach (AUS); 1991	Market Maid	Marjoram
