= Sebring (horse) =

Australian-bred Thoroughbred racehorse

- Sire: More Than Ready
- Grandsire: Southern Halo
- Dam: Purespeed
- Damsire: Flying Spur
- Sex: Stallion
- Foaled: 23 September 2005
- Died: 23 February 2019 (aged 13)
- Country: Australia
- Colour: Chestnut
- Breeder: Corumbene Stud Pty Ltd
- Owner: Mr J Hazzisevastos, Mr S Mekertichian, Ms M A Butler, Mr J S Mcdonnell, Mrs M A Mcdonnell, Mrs D A Dunphy, Mr B Leonard, Mr J Screnci, Mrs W J Mullens
- Trainer: Gai Waterhouse
- Record: 6:5-1-0
- Earnings: A$2,473,094

Major wins
- Golden Slipper G1 (2008); AJC Sires Produce Stakes G1 (2008)

Awards
- Australian Champion Two Year Old (2008)
- Last updated on 27 December 2010

Sebring (23 September 2005 – 23 February 2019) was a top class Australian Thoroughbred racehorse, that as a two-year-old won five of his six race starts. After winning the AJC Breeders' Plate in his spring debut, he had wins in the Golden Slipper and AJC Sires Produce Stakes and second place, defeated by a nose, in the AJC Champagne Stakes.

== Breeding ==
He was a chestnut stallion standing 16.1 hands high that was foaled on 23 September 2005. Sebring was by More Than Ready from Purespeed by Flying Spur. Bred by Corumbene Stud Pty Ltd, he was sold at the 2007 Conrad Jupiters Magic Millions Sale to Star Thoroughbreds for A$130,000.

== Race record ==
He enjoyed great success as a two-year-old, including Group One (G1) wins in the Golden Slipper and AJC Sires Produce Stakes.

In Sydney, Blake Shinn, a former Victorian jockey, forfeited the $3,525,800 Golden Slipper ride to Glen Boss because of a suspension. He returned to the $450,000 AJC Sires Produce Stakes at Randwick in which he rode Sebring to win the race, the second leg of the juvenile triple crown.

On 3 May 2008, Sebring failed to complete the triple crown when he was defeated by a short head in the Champagne Stakes by Samantha Miss.

In late July 2008, Sebring had stress-related bone bruising and had to be spelled for two months, effectively ending any attempt at the Melbourne Spring Racing Carnival.

Two-year-old: 2007–08 season
Result	Date	Race	Venue	Distance	Weight (kg)	Time	Jockey	Winner	2nd
Won	19/1/2008	Darley Guineas (2yo)	Rosehill	1100m	57.5	1:06.1	B. Shinn	Sebring	Over The Wicket
Won	16/2/2008	Canonbury Stakes (2yo C&G)	Randwick	1000m	54.0	58.1	B. Shinn	Sebring	Ming Hol Treasure
Won	1/3/2008	NSW Breeders' Plate (2yo C&G)	Randwick	1100m	56.0	1:04.9	B. Shinn	Sebring	Dubai To Sydney
Won	19/4/2008	Golden Slipper (2yo)	Rosehill	1200m	56.5	1:12.8	Glen Boss	Sebring	Von Costa De Hero
Won	26/4/2008	AJC Sires Produce Stakes (2yo)	Randwick	1400m	56.5	1:12.8	B. Shinn	Sebring	Samantha Miss
2nd	3/5/2008	Champagne Stakes (2yo)	Randwick	1600m	56.5	1:38.28	B. Shinn	Samantha Miss	Sebring

== Stud record ==
Following an unsatisfactory fitness trial on 27 January 2009, the owners of Sebring decided to retire the horse to stud. He was standing at the Widden Stud at a service fee of $60,500 inc GST.

=== Notable stock ===
Sebring has currently sired 9 individual Group 1 winners:

c = colt, f = filly, g = gelding

Foaled	Name	Sex	Major wins
2010	Dissident	c	Randwick Guineas (2013); Memsie Stakes (2014); Makybe Diva Stakes (2014); C F Orr Stakes (2015); All Aged Stakes (2015)
2010	Criterion	c	Rosehill Guineas (2014); ATC Derby (2014); Queen Elizabeth Stakes (2015); Caulfield Stakes (2015)
2011	Lucky Bubbles	g	Chairman's Sprint Prize (2017)
2013	Egg Tart	f	Australasian Oaks (2017); Queensland Oaks (2017)
2013	Nettoyer	f	Doncaster Handicap (2020)
2015	Amphitrite	f	The Thousand Guineas (2018)
2016	Superstorm	g	Cantala Stakes (2021)
2018	Fangirl	f	Vinery Stud Stakes (2022); Winx Stakes (2023); King Charles III Stakes (2023)
2019	Tashi	f	Tattersall's Tiara (2025)

== Pedigree ==
Pedigree of Sebring (AUS), chestnut horse, 2005
Sire More Than Ready (USA) 1997	Southern Halo (USA); 1983	Halo (USA)	Hail To Reason (USA)
Sire More Than Ready (USA) 1997	Southern Halo (USA); 1983	Halo (USA)	Cosmah (USA)
Sire More Than Ready (USA) 1997	Southern Halo (USA); 1983	Northern Sea (USA)	Northern Dancer (Can)
Sire More Than Ready (USA) 1997	Southern Halo (USA); 1983	Northern Sea (USA)	Sea Saga (USA)
Sire More Than Ready (USA) 1997	Woodman's Girl (USA); 1990	Woodman (USA)	Mr Prospector (USA)
Sire More Than Ready (USA) 1997	Woodman's Girl (USA); 1990	Woodman (USA)	Playmate (USA)
Sire More Than Ready (USA) 1997	Woodman's Girl (USA); 1990	Becky Be Good (USA)	Naskra (USA)
Sire More Than Ready (USA) 1997	Woodman's Girl (USA); 1990	Becky Be Good (USA)	Good Landing (USA)
Dam Purespeed (Aus) 1998	Flying Spur (Aus); 1992	Danehill (USA)	Danzig (USA)
Dam Purespeed (Aus) 1998	Flying Spur (Aus); 1992	Danehill (USA)	Razyana (USA)
Dam Purespeed (Aus) 1998	Flying Spur (Aus); 1992	Rolls (USA)	Mr Prospector (USA)
Dam Purespeed (Aus) 1998	Flying Spur (Aus); 1992	Rolls (USA)	Grande Luxe (USA)
Dam Purespeed (Aus) 1998	Lady Moulin (Aus); 1982	Luskin Star (Aus)	Kaoru Star (Aus)
Dam Purespeed (Aus) 1998	Lady Moulin (Aus); 1982	Luskin Star (Aus)	Promising (NZ)
Dam Purespeed (Aus) 1998	Lady Moulin (Aus); 1982	Willowy (Aus)	Better Boy (Ire)
Dam Purespeed (Aus) 1998	Lady Moulin (Aus); 1982	Willowy (Aus)	Far Vista (Aus) (Family: 6C)

== Death ==
Sebring died of a heart attack aged 13 years whilst still performing stud duties at Widden Stud.

== See also ==
- List of leading Thoroughbred racehorses
