= Research (horse) =

Australian-bred Thoroughbred racehorse

- Sire: Imperial Prince
- Grandsire: Sir Ivor
- Dam: Outing
- Damsire: Boucher
- Sex: Mare
- Foaled: 1985
- Country: Australia
- Colour: Bay
- Breeder: Newhaven Park Stud
- Trainer: Clarry Conners
- Record: 31: 9-5-2
- Earnings: $1,880,845

Major wins
- Furious Stakes (1988); Flight Stakes (1988); Wakeful Stakes (1988); VRC Oaks (1988); Storm Queen Stakes (1989); AJC Derby (1989); AJC Oaks (1989)

Awards
- Australian Champion Racehorse of the Year (1989)

Honours
- Research Stakes (now known as the Golden Pendant)

Research was a champion Australian Thoroughbred racehorse who as a three-year-old carved out a unique place in Australian racing history by becoming the only filly to win the AJC Derby-AJC Oaks double.

Bred at Newhaven Park Stud, Boorowa, NSW she was sired by Imperial Prince (IRE) and her dam Outing was by Boucher. Research was trained by Warwick Farm-based trainer Clarrie Conners.

In 1988 Research won most of the major spring three-year-old races in Sydney and Melbourne by winning the Group 1 Flight Stakes (over 1600 metres) at Randwick and the VRC Oaks (over 2500 metres) at Flemington. She also won the Group 2 Wakeful Stakes that spring and finished second to Riverina Charm in the Group 1 The Thousand Guineas.

In her autumn campaign in 1989, after winning the Group 2 Storm Queen Stakes (over 2000 metres) at Rosehill, Research won the AJC Derby at Randwick and backed up four days later to win the AJC Oaks at the same track to complete an unprecedented AJC Derby-Oaks double. The filly’s victory in the AJC Oaks also secured her a rare VRC-AJC Oaks double.

Research was not as successful as a four-year-old and never regained the form that had made her so formidable as a three-year-old.

Her feats as a three-year-old earned her the title of Australian Champion Racehorse of the Year for the 1988-1989 season.
