= Savatiano (horse) =

Australian thoroughbred racehorse

- Racing silks of Godolphin
- Sire: Street Cry
- Grandsire: Machiavellian
- Dam: Retsina
- Damsire: Redoute's Choice
- Sex: Mare
- Foaled: 7 September 2014
- Country: Australia
- Colour: Bay
- Breeder: Darley Stud
- Owner: Godolphin
- Trainer: John O'Shea (2017); James Cummings (2017 onwards)
- Record: 41: 12–10–3
- Earnings: AU$2,303,660

Major wins
- Moreton Stakes (2019); Tristarc Stakes (2019); Millie Fox Stakes (2020); P B Lawrence Stakes (2020); Hot Danish Stakes (2020); Expressway Stakes (2021); ~~Canterbury Stakes (2021)~~

Savatiano (foaled 7 September 2014) is a retired, multiple stakes winning Australian bred thoroughbred racehorse.

== Background ==
A Darley homebred, Savatiano is a half-sister to Athiri (Lonhro), who was placed in the Blue Diamond Prelude Fillies, Kindergarten Stakes and Magic Night Stakes. Her second dam Star Shiraz won the G1 Sires' Produce Stakes and was placed in the G1 Coolmore Classic and the TJ Smith Classic.

== Racing career ==
Savatiano is the winner of 12 races which includes 7 Stakes races. Her most prestigious win was the 2021 Canterbury Stakes at Group 1 level. However, twelve months later she was disqualified from this race for returning a positive swab to a prohibited substance.

== Breeding career ==
Savitiano's first foal was sired by multiple Group 1 winning stallion Lonhro. A colt was produced named Attica, which was successful in winning the 2025 Group 1 Spring Champion Stakes.

== Pedigree ==
Pedigree of Savatiano (AUS) 2014
Sire Street Cry (IRE) 1998	Machiavellian (USA); 1987	Mr. Prospector	Raise a Native
Sire Street Cry (IRE) 1998	Machiavellian (USA); 1987	Mr. Prospector	Gold Digger
Sire Street Cry (IRE) 1998	Machiavellian (USA); 1987	Coup de Folie	Halo
Sire Street Cry (IRE) 1998	Machiavellian (USA); 1987	Coup de Folie	Raise The Standard
Sire Street Cry (IRE) 1998	Helen Street (GB); 1982	Troy	Petingo
Sire Street Cry (IRE) 1998	Helen Street (GB); 1982	Troy	La Milo
Sire Street Cry (IRE) 1998	Helen Street (GB); 1982	Waterway	Riverman
Sire Street Cry (IRE) 1998	Helen Street (GB); 1982	Waterway	Boulevard
Dam Retsina (AUS) 2008	Redoute's Choice (AUS); 1996	Danehill	Danzig
Dam Retsina (AUS) 2008	Redoute's Choice (AUS); 1996	Danehill	Razyana
Dam Retsina (AUS) 2008	Redoute's Choice (AUS); 1996	Shanthas Choice	Canny Lad
Dam Retsina (AUS) 2008	Redoute's Choice (AUS); 1996	Shanthas Choice	Dancing Show
Dam Retsina (AUS) 2008	Star Shiraz (AUS); 2001	Sequalo	Rustic Amber
Dam Retsina (AUS) 2008	Star Shiraz (AUS); 2001	Sequalo	Dash Around
Dam Retsina (AUS) 2008	Star Shiraz (AUS); 2001	Starshine Express	Semipalatinsk
Dam Retsina (AUS) 2008	Star Shiraz (AUS); 2001	Starshine Express	Starshine
