= In Secret =

In Secret may refer to:

- In Secret (film), a 2013 American erotic thriller romance film
- In Secret (horse), an Australian Thoroughbred race horse
