= Sheraco Stakes =

- Class: Group 2
- Location: Rosehill Racecourse, Sydney, Australia
- Inaugurated: 1998
- Race type: Thoroughbred
- Sponsor: Irresistible Pools (2014-26)

Race information
- Distance: 1,200 metres
- Surface: Turf
- Track: Right-handed
- Qualification: Fillies and mares Three years old and older
- Weight: Set weights with penalties
- Purse: $300,000 (2026)

The Sheraco Stakes is an Australian Turf Club Group 2 Thoroughbred horse race for horses three years old and older, fillies and mares, at set weights with penalties, over a distance of 1200 metres. It is held annually at Rosehill Racecourse, Sydney, Australia in September.

== History ==
The race is named in honour of the 1982 Australian Oaks winning filly Sheraco.

=== Distance ===
- Prior 2012 – 1100 metres
- 2013 onwards - 1200 metres

=== Grade ===
- Prior to 1999 - Unlisted quality handicap
- 2000–2012 - Listed Race
- 2013–2017 - Group 3
- 2018 onwards - Group 2

=== Name ===
- 2002–2004 - Winning Edge Presentation Stakes

=== Other venues ===
- 2021 - Kembla Grange Racecourse

== Winners ==
The following are past winners of the race.

- 2026 - Savvy Hallie
- 2025 - Manaal
- 2024 - Sunshine In Paris
- 2023 - Sunshine In Paris
- 2022 - Shades Of Rose
- 2021 - Entriviere
- 2020 - Haut Brion Her
- 2019 - Mizzy
- 2018 - Invincibella
- 2017 - Ravi
- 2016 - Heavens Above
- 2015 - Catkins
- 2014 - Catkins
- 2013 - Driefontein
- 2012 - More Joyous
- 2011 - Gybe
- 2010 - More Joyous
- 2009 - Madame Pedrille
- †2008 - Hairy
- 2008 - Mimi Lebrock
- 2006 - At Ease
- 2005 - Shannon Bank
- 2004 - Covet Thee
- 2003 - Oomph
- 2002 - Pompeii
- 2001 - Nanny Maroon
- 2000 - Brief Kiss
- 1999 - Monisha
- 1998 - Patou

† Race moved in the racing calendar from late summer to early spring in 2008 due to the equine influenza outbreak in 2007

== See also ==
- Ming Dynasty Quality Handicap
- The Run To The Rose
- Theo Marks Stakes
- List of Australian Group races
- Group races
