= Star Kingdom Stakes =

Australian horse race

- Class: Group 3
- Location: Rosehill Gardens Racecourse; Sydney, New South Wales, Australia
- Inaugurated: 1979
- Race type: Thoroughbred – Flat racing
- Sponsor: E-Group Security (2017-26)

Race information
- Distance: 1,200 metres
- Surface: Turf
- Track: Right-handed
- Qualification: Three years old and older
- Weight: Quality Handicap
- Purse: $250,000 (2026)

The Star Kingdom Stakes is an Australian Turf Club Group 3 Thoroughbred quality handicap horse race, for horses aged three years old and upwards, over a distance of 1200 metres, held annually at Rosehill Racecourse in Sydney, Australia.

== History ==
The registered race is named in honour of Star Kingdom, the five times Leading sire in Australia and sire of the winner of the first five Golden Slipper Stakes.

The race has been run as the Sebring Stakes between 2010–14 in honour of Sebring winner of the 2008 Golden Slipper Stakes. The race reverted to the registered race name in 2015 while the Listed race registered as the Darby Munro Stakes, was run as The Sebring.

=== Name ===
- 1979–1999 - Star Kingdom Stakes
- 2000–2004 - Star Kingdom Quality Stakes
- 2005–2008 - Nivea Visage Stakes
- 2009 - Star Kingdom Stakes
- 2010–2012 - Sebring Stakes
- 2013 - Sebring HKJC Stakes
- 2014 - Sebring Stakes
- 2015 - Star Kingdom Stakes

=== Distance ===
- 1979–2007 – 1200 metres
- 2008 – 1200 metres (held at Canterbury)
- 2009–2012 – 1100 metres
- 2013 onwards – 1200 metres

=== Grade ===
- 1979–1987 - Listed Race
- 1988 onwards - Group 3

=== Venue ===
- 2022 - Newcastle Racecourse

== Winners ==
The following are past winners of the race.

- 2026 - Roselyn's Son
- 2025 - General Salute
- 2024 - Bandi's boy
- 2023 - Bacchanalia
- 2022 - Gem Song
- 2021 - Signore Fox
- 2020 - Vegadaze
- 2019 - Siren's Fury
- 2018 - Spright
- 2017 - Jungle Edge
- 2016 - Malaguerra
- 2015 - Generalife
- 2014 - Flamberge
- 2013 - Hot Snitzel
- 2012 - Zaratone
- 2011 - Swift Alliance
- 2010 - Swift Alliance
- 2009 - The Jackal
- 2008 - Hoystar
- 2007 - Posadas
- 2006 - Mustard
- 2005 - Red Oog
- 2004 - Taikun
- 2003 - Bradshaw
- 2002 - Bradshaw
- 2001 - Camena
- 2000 - King Of Acapulco
- 1999 - Return To Go
- 1998 - Hockney
- 1997 - Citi Success
- 1996 - Moss Rocket
- 1995 - Legal Agent
- 1994 - Jetball
- 1993 - Friend's Venture
- 1992 - Friend's Venture
- 1991 - Kessem
- 1990 - Investor
- 1989 - Magic Gleam
- 1988 - Lunch On Sunday
- 1987 - Targlish
- 1986 - At Sea
- 1985 - Gunyatti
- 1984 - Manuan
- 1983 - Bronze Spirit
- 1982 - Bold Jet
- 1981 - Bemboka Yacht
- 1980 - Radiant Echo
- 1979 - The Judge

== See also ==
- T L Baillieu Handicap
- Doncaster Prelude
- Emancipation Stakes
- Neville Sellwood Stakes
- H E Tancred Stakes
- Tulloch Stakes
- Vinery Stud Stakes
- List of Australian Group races
- Group races
