= Neville Sellwood Stakes =

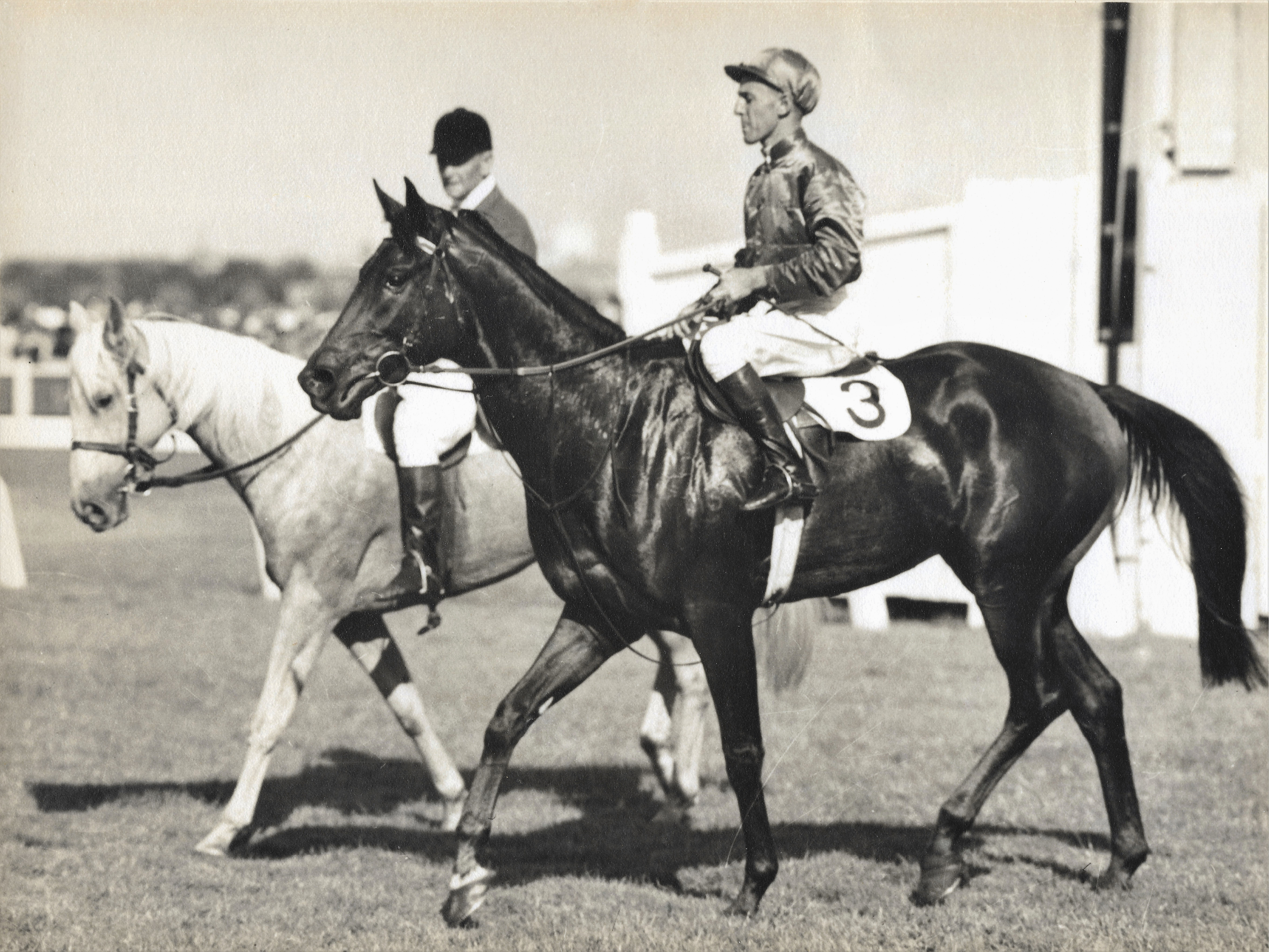
- Neville Sellwood
- Class: Group 2
- Location: Rosehill Gardens Racecourse; Sydney, New South Wales
- Inaugurated: 1980
- Race type: Thoroughbred – Flat racing
- Sponsor: Asahi Super Dry (2026)

Race information
- Distance: 2,000 metres
- Surface: Turf
- Track: Right-handed
- Qualification: Four years old and older
- Weight: Quality handicap
- Purse: $300,000 (2026)

The Neville Sellwood Stakes is an Australian Turf Club Group 3 Thoroughbred quality handicap horse race, for horses aged four years old and older, over a distance of 2000 metres, held annually at Rosehill Racecourse in Sydney, Australia.

== History ==
The race is named after jockey Neville Sellwood (1922−1962), who rode champions Tulloch and Todman, first Golden Slipper Stakes winner. Sellwood was also victorious in the USA and in 1962 achieved what was perhaps his greatest success, victory on Larkspur in The Derby. Sellwood died after a fall in 1962 at Maisons-Laffitte Racecourse, near Paris, France.

=== Name ===
- 1980–1990 - Neville Sellwood Stakes
- 1991–1992 - Five Star Studs Quality Handicap
- 1993 - Neville Sellwood Stakes
- 1994–1996 - The Quick-Eze Handicap
- 1997 - Neville Sellwood Stakes
- 1998 - Stephenson Food Service Stakes
- 1999–2009 - Neville Sellwood Stakes
- 2010 - Canterbury Bankstown Express Neville Sellwood Stakes
- 2011 - Queen's Cup
- 2012 - Cellarbrations HKJC Stakes
- 2013 onwards - Neville Sellwood Stakes

=== Distance ===
- 1980–2009 – 2000 metres
- 2010 – 1900 metres (held at Canterbury)
- 2011 onwards - 2000 metres

=== Grade ===
- 1989–2010 - Listed Race
- 2011–2024 - Group 3
- 2025 onwards - Group 2

== Winners ==
The following are past winners of the race.

- 2026 - Wootton Verni
- 2025 - Ceolwulf
- 2024 - Serpentine
- 2023 - Zeyrek
- 2022 - Mount Popa
- 2021 - Shared Ambition
- 2020 - Night's Watch
- 2019 - Taikomochi
- 2018 - Arbeitsam
- 2017 - Assign
- 2016 - It's Somewhat
- 2015 - Pornichet
- 2014 - Junoob
- 2013 - Lights of Heaven
- 2012 - Western Symbol
- 2011 - Syreon
- 2010 - Herculian Prince
- 2009 - Ausbred King
- 2008 - Nuclear Sky
- 2007 - Coalesce
- 2006 - Men At Work
- 2005 - Jeremiad
- 2004 - Shower Of Roses
- 2003 - Heeby Reiby
- 2002 - Youhadyourwarning
- 2001 - Inaflury
- 2000 - Gypsy's Daughter
- 1999 - Inshallah
- 1998 - Star Covet
- 1997 - Seto Stayer
- 1996 - Saranggani
- 1995 - Sky Watch
- 1994 - Protara's Bay
- 1993 - Upwards
- 1992 - Red For Go
- 1991 - Native Neptune
- 1990 - Red Chiffon
- 1989 - Round The World
- 1988 - Ostensible
- 1987 - Out Of Sight
- 1986 - Beelbangera
- 1985 - Look Aloft
- 1984 - Spring Moss
- 1983 - Il Rubino
- 1982 - Mr Digby
- 1981 - More Mink
- 1980 - Iko

== See also ==
- T L Baillieu Handicap
- Doncaster Prelude
- Emancipation Stakes
- Star Kingdom Stakes
- H E Tancred Stakes
- Tulloch Stakes
- Vinery Stud Stakes
- List of Australian Group races
- Group races
