= The Run To The Rose =

Australian Thoroughbred horse race

- Class: Group 2
- Location: Rosehill Gardens Racecourse; Sydney, New South Wales, Australia
- Inaugurated: 2003
- Race type: Thoroughbred – Flat racing
- Sponsor: Yulong (2025 & 2026)

Race information
- Distance: 1,200 metres
- Surface: Turf
- Track: Right-handed
- Qualification: Three-year-olds
- Weight: Set weights with penalties
- Purse: $300,000 (2025)

The Run To The Rose is an Australian Turf Club Group 2 Thoroughbred horse race for three-year-olds, at set weights with penalties, over a distance of 1200 metres, at Rosehill Racecourse, Sydney, Australia in September.

== History ==
Prizemoney was increased in 2015 from $125,000 to $175,000.

=== Name ===
- 2003–2004 - Monakea 3YO Quality Handicap
- 2005 - Smithfield RSL Club Handicap

=== Distance ===
- 2003–2010 – 1300 metres
- 2011 onwards - 1200 metres

=== Grade ===
- 2003–2006 - Listed Race
- 2007–2014 - Group 3
- 2015 onwards - Group 2

=== Other venues ===
- 2021 - Kembla Grange Racecourse

== Winners ==
The following are past winners of the race.

- 2026 - Warwoven
- 2025 - Tempted
- 2024 - Traffic Warden
- 2023 - Cylinder
- 2022 - In Secret
- 2021 - Anamoe
- 2020 - Rothfire
- 2019 - Bivouac
- 2018 - Lean Mean Machine
- 2017 - Menari
- 2016 - Astern
- 2015 - Exosphere
- 2014 - Hallowed Crown
- 2013 - Va Pensiero
- 2012 - Pierro
- 2011 - Smart Missile
- 2010 - Squamosa
- 2009 - Denman
- 2008 - Desuetude
- 2007 - El Cambio
- 2006 - Mentality
- 2005 - Paratroopers
- 2004 - Eremein
- 2003 - Gilded Youth

== See also ==
- Ming Dynasty Quality Handicap
- Sheraco Stakes
- Theo Marks Stakes
- List of Australian Group races
- Group races
