= Millie Fox Stakes =

- Class: Group 2
- Location: Rosehill Gardens Racecourse
- Inaugurated: 1996
- Race type: Thoroughbred
- Sponsor: Vinery Stud (2026)

Race information
- Distance: 1,300 metres
- Surface: Turf
- Track: Right-handed
- Qualification: Fillies and mares three years old and older
- Weight: Set weights with penalties
- Purse: $300,000 (2026)

The Millie Fox Stakes is an Australian Turf Club Group 2 horse race for fillies and mares aged three years old and older run over the sprint distance of 1300 metres under set weights with penalties conditions at Randwick Racecourse, Sydney, Australia in February or early March.

== History ==
The race is named after Millie Fox, who had a keen interest in the sport of thoroughbreds after her husband Stan Fox bought her a horse in 1965. After her husband's death, Millie took over Nebo Lodge stables and worked successfully with trainer Brian Mayfield-Smith.

=== Grade ===
- 1996–2006 - Listed race
- 2007–2012 - Group 3
- 2013 upgraded - Group 2

=== Distance ===
- 1996–2005 - 1200 metres
- 2006 onwards - 1300 metres

=== Name ===
- 1996–1998 - Millie Fox Stakes
- 1999 - Millie Fox Plate
- 2000 - Millie Fox Stakes
- 2001–2002 - Millie Fox Handicap
- 2003 onwards - Millie Fox Stakes

== Winners ==
the following are past winners of the race.

- 2026 - Cinsault
- 2025 - Firestorm
- 2024 - Zougotcha
- 2023 - Electric Girl
- 2022 - Expat
- 2021 - Subpoenaed
- 2020 - Savatiano
- 2019 - White Moss
- 2018 - Daysee Doom
- 2017 - In Her Time
- 2016 - First Seal
- 2015 - Catkins
- 2014 - Red Tracer
- 2013 - Red Tracer
- 2012 - Red Tracer
- 2011 - Montana Flyer
- 2010 - Montana Flyer
- 2009 - Neroli
- 2008 - November Flight
- 2007 - A Country Girl
- 2006 - Wild Queen
- 2005 - Tivoli Dancer
- 2004 - Seances
- 2003 - Gentle Genius
- 2002 - Triko
- 2001 - Nanny Maroon
- 2000 - Verdict Declared
- 1999 - Wynciti
- 1998 - Just Like Crystal
- 1997 - Dashing Eagle
- 1996 - Chlorophyll

== See also ==
- List of Australian Group races
- Group races
