= Tulloch Stakes =

- Class: Group 2
- Location: Rosehill Gardens Racecourse; Sydney, New South Wales, Australia
- Inaugurated: 1973
- Race type: Thoroughbred – Flat racing
- Sponsor: Toyota Forklifts (2024 - 2026)

Race information
- Distance: 2,000 metres
- Surface: Turf
- Track: Right-handed
- Qualification: Three-year-old colts and geldings
- Weight: Set weights - 56 kg
- Purse: $300,000 (2026)

The Tulloch Stakes is an Australian Turf Club Group 2 Thoroughbred horse race, for three-year-old colts and geldings, at set weights, over a distance of 2000 metres, held annually at Rosehill Racecourse in Sydney Australia.

== History ==
The race is in honour of champion Tulloch, who as a three-year-old in 1957 won 14 out of 16 races he competed in.

=== Name ===
- 1973–1986 - Tulloch Stakes
- 1987–1989 - Carringbush Cup
- 1990–1995 - Tulloch Stakes
- 1996–2001 - Tulloch Wine Stakes
- 2002–2007 - Tulloch Stakes
- 2008–2011 - Myer Tulloch Stakes
- 2012 onwards - Tulloch Stakes

=== Venue ===
- 2022 - Newcastle Racecourse

=== Distance ===
- 1973–1978 – 1850 metres
- 1979–2021 – 2000 metres
- 2022 – 1850 metres
- 2023 onwards – 2000 metres

=== Grade ===
- 1973–1978 - Principal Race
- 1979 onwards - Group 2

== Winners ==
The following are past winners of the race.

- 2026 - Storm Leopard
- 2025 - Pocketing
- 2024 - Wymark
- 2023 - Tapildoodledo
- 2022 - Character
- 2021 - Yaletown
- 2020 - Quick Thinker
- 2019 - Angel Of Truth
- 2018 - Levendi
- 2017 - Jon Snow
- 2016 - Old North
- 2015 - Hauraki
- 2014 - Gallatin
- 2013 - Philippi
- 2012 - Polish Knight
- 2011 - Fast Clip
- 2010 - Count Encosta
- 2009 - Harris Tweed
- 2008 - Book Of Kells
- 2007 - Tipungwuti
- 2006 - Manton
- 2005 - Stella Grande
- 2004 - Starcraft
- 2003 - Natural Blitz
- 2002 - Prince Of War
- 2001 - Zareyev
- 2000 - Shogun Lodge
- 1999 - Lease
- 1998 - Northern Drake
- 1997 - Heroes Return
- 1996 - Peep On The Sly
- 1995 - Ivory's Irish
- 1994 - Mahogany
- 1993 - The Bill
- 1992 - Zamination
- 1991 - Durbridge
- 1990 - Fill The Bill
- 1989 - Our Krona
- 1988 - Mighty Willem
- 1987 - Our Palliser
- 1986 - Periscope
- 1985 - Prince Frolic
- 1984 - Prolific
- 1983 - Hermod
- 1982 - Binbinga
- 1981 - Ring the Bell
- 1980 - Prince Ruling
- 1979 - Career
- 1978 - Lefroy
- 1977 - Ming Dynasty
- 1976 - Balmerino
- 1975 - Mansingh
- 1974 - Asgard
- 1973 - Longfella

== See also ==
- T L Baillieu Handicap
- Doncaster Prelude
- Emancipation Stakes
- Neville Sellwood Stakes
- Star Kingdom Stakes
- H E Tancred Stakes
- Vinery Stud Stakes
- List of Australian Group races
- Group races
