= In Her Time =

Australian thoroughbred racehorse

- Sire: Time Thief (AUS)
- Grandsire: Redoute's Choice (AUS)
- Dam: Hell It's Hot (AUS)
- Damsire: Zeditave (AUS)
- Sex: Mare
- Foaled: 2012
- Country: Australia
- Colour: Bay or Brown
- Breeder: D Cobcroft
- Owner: Orbis Bloodstock, Mr P J Brown
- Trainer: Ben Smith (2015-2018); Kris Lees (2018-2020)
- Record: 31: 9–5–4
- Earnings: A$3,772,725

Major wins
- Breeders Classic (2017); Millie Fox Stakes (2017); Premiere Stakes (2017); Sydney Stakes (2017); The Galaxy (2018); Black Caviar Lightning (2019)

Awards
- NSW Provincial Horse of the Year (2018, 2019)
- Last updated on 28 July 2020

In Her Time (foaled 9 September 2012) is a multiple Group 1 winning Australian thoroughbred racehorse.

== Background ==
At the 2014 Inglis Classic yearling sale, In Her Time had a reserve price of A$ 40,000, however this was not met.

== Racing career ==
In Her Time initially started her racing career under Newcastle trainer Ben Smith. In 2017 the mare was ridden by Zac Purton to win the Group 1 Galaxy at Royal Randwick Racecourse.

In September 2018 trainer Ben Smith was stood down from training due to elevated cobalt levels being found in two horses, giving false evidence and refusing to give evidence to stewards.

Fellow Newcastle trainer Kris Lees became the mare's new trainer and the horse was successful in winning her second Group 1 race the 2019 Black Caviar Lightning at Flemington Racecourse, ridden by Corey Brown.

In Her Time raced a further seven times without success, however she did run placings in the Group 1 VRC Sprint Classic behind Nature Strip and a narrow defeat in the Hawkesbury Crown at her final start.

== Breeding career ==
After retiring from racing, In Her Time was sold to Newgate Stud Farm for A$2,200,000.

In Her Time gave birth to her first foal in 2021, a colt by stallion I Am Invincible.

== Pedigree ==
Pedigree of In Her Time (AUS) 2012
| Sire Time Thief (AUS) 2005 | Redoute's Choice (AUS); 1996 | Danehill | Danzig |
| Sire Time Thief (AUS) 2005 | Redoute's Choice (AUS); 1996 | Danehill | Razyana |
| Sire Time Thief (AUS) 2005 | Redoute's Choice (AUS); 1996 | Shantha's Choice | Canny Lad |
| Sire Time Thief (AUS) 2005 | Redoute's Choice (AUS); 1996 | Shantha's Choice | Dancing Show |
| Sire Time Thief (AUS) 2005 | Procrastinate (AUS); 1990 | Jade Hunter | Mr. Prospector |
| Sire Time Thief (AUS) 2005 | Procrastinate (AUS); 1990 | Jade Hunter | Jadana |
| Sire Time Thief (AUS) 2005 | Procrastinate (AUS); 1990 | Reigntaine | Century |
| Sire Time Thief (AUS) 2005 | Procrastinate (AUS); 1990 | Reigntaine | Rainbeam |
| Dam Hell It's Hot (AUS) 2002 | Zeditave (AUS); 1985 | The Judge | Showdown |
| Dam Hell It's Hot (AUS) 2002 | Zeditave (AUS); 1985 | The Judge | Bellition |
| Dam Hell It's Hot (AUS) 2002 | Zeditave (AUS); 1985 | Summoned | Crowned Prince |
| Dam Hell It's Hot (AUS) 2002 | Zeditave (AUS); 1985 | Summoned | Sweet Life |
| Dam Hell It's Hot (AUS) 2002 | Steam Heat (AUS); 1986 | Salieri | Accipiter |
| Dam Hell It's Hot (AUS) 2002 | Steam Heat (AUS); 1986 | Salieri | Hogan's Sister |
| Dam Hell It's Hot (AUS) 2002 | Steam Heat (AUS); 1986 | Supaburn | Blazing Saddles |
| Dam Hell It's Hot (AUS) 2002 | Steam Heat (AUS); 1986 | Supaburn | Vista Anna |
