= Wayne Slattery (equestrian) =

Australian equestrian

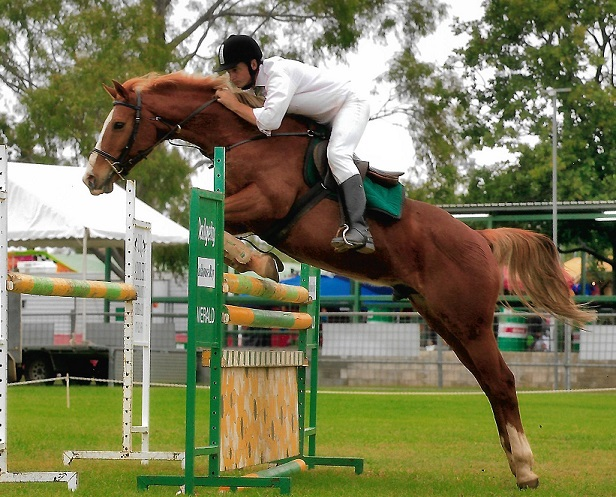
- Slattery riding Abu Tinka
- Born: 1 December 1970 (age 55); Wagga Wagga, New South Wales
- Occupation: Farrier
- Spouse: Ingrid Slattery
- Parent(s): Anne Slattery, Raymond Slattery

Wayne Slattery (born 1970 in Wagga Wagga, New South Wales) is a showjumper. He attended Hawkesbury Agricultural College and completed his farrier apprenticeship with John Doherty in 1990. From 1990 to 1991, he worked at Hayata Farm in Japan where his duties included shoeing 170 horses, riding young horses and training and competing showjumping horses. While in Japan, Slattery worked with horses such as Narita Brian and Sunday Silence.

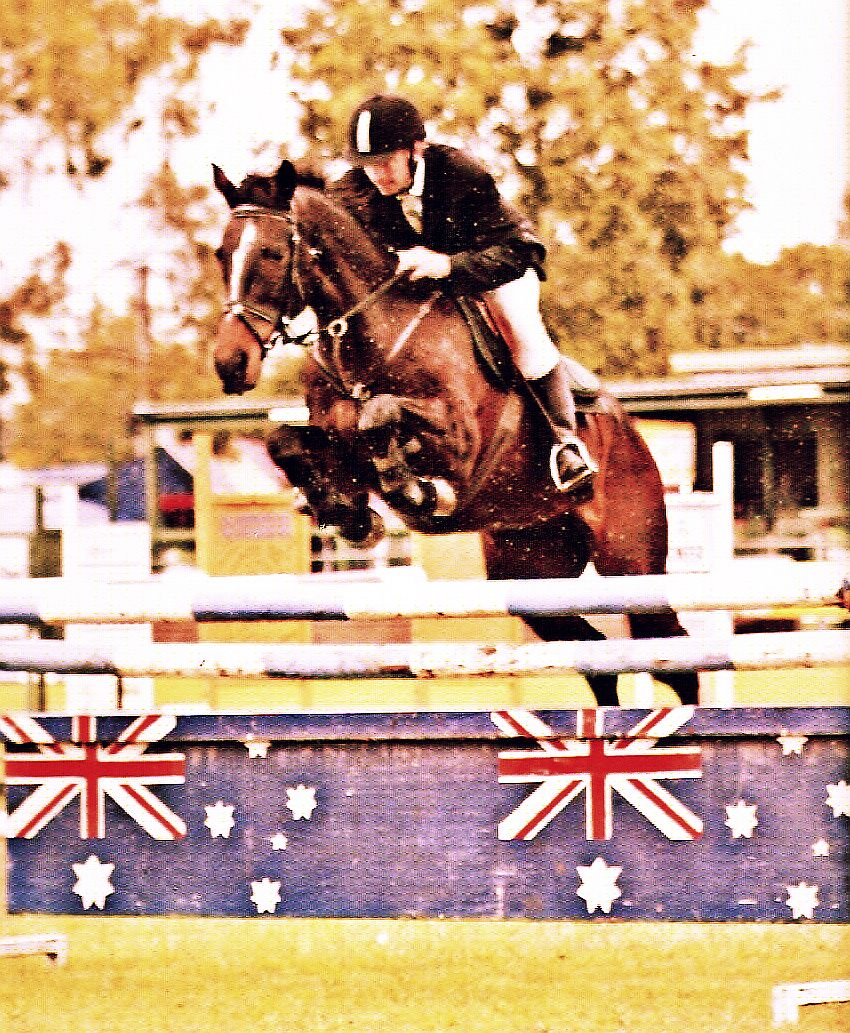
Wayne Slattery riding Southern Style in 2012

From 1992 to 2001, Slattery worked as a farrier in and around Canberra ACT. Slattery also trained and competed showjumping horses and held a Racehorse Trainers Licence. In 2001, Slattery relocated to Goulburn NSW where he stayed until 2013, when he moved north to Briddon Park Moss Vale NSW, the birthplace of champion racehorse Grand Zulu. Briddon Park stands the Thoroughbred stallion Danbird (AUS), a horse that was broken in by Slattery and went on to win the Pago Pago Stakes race. Briddon Park having been reinvented and now selling Thoroughbred yearlings through peak industry sales.

In 2013, Slattery ran for the senate in the ACT.

Slattery is the CEO of The Good Samaritans Charity and founder of Life After Racing. Slattery is a member of the Animal Welfare Advisory Committee for the ACT Government Chief Minister on matters surrounding animal welfare.

In 2016, Slattery was breaking in horses at Briddon Park and shoeing horses in the Southern Highlands, NSW.
