= Golden Pendant =

- Class: Group 2
- Location: Rosehill Racecourse, Sydney, Australia
- Inaugurated: 1996 (as Research Fillies & Mares Quality Handicap)
- Race type: Thoroughbred
- Sponsor: Racing and Sports (2025)

Race information
- Distance: 1,400 metres
- Surface: Turf
- Track: Right-handed
- Qualification: Fillies and mares, three years old and older
- Weight: Set weights with penalties
- Purse: $400,000 (2025)

The Golden Pendant, is an Australian Turf Club Group 2 Thoroughbred horserace for fillies and mares aged three years old and upwards with set weights with penalties conditions over a distance of 1400 metres, held annually at Rosehill Racecourse, Sydney, Australia in September. Total prizemoney for the race is A$400,000.

== History ==
=== Name ===
Originally this race was run as the Research Stakes in honour of 1988-89 Australian Horse of the Year, Research who won the AJC Derby, AJC Oaks, Flight Stakes, VRC Oaks. In 2011 the race was renamed to the Golden Pendant.

=== Grade ===
- 1998–2000 - Listed race
- 2001–2014 - Group 3
- 2015 onwards - Group 2

=== Distance ===
- 1996–2011 - 1200 metres
- 2012 onwards - 1400 metres

== Winners ==
- 2025 - Manaal
- 2024 - Makarena
- 2023 - Espiona
- 2022 - Nimalee
- 2021 - Vangelic
- 2020 - Subpoenaed
- 2019 - Mizzy
- 2018 - Shumookh
- 2017 - Dayses Doom
- 2016 - Tycoon Tara
- 2015 - Peeping
- 2014 - Arabian Gold
- 2013 - Sharnee Rose
- 2012 - More Joyous
- 2011 - Screen
- 2010 - Trim
- 2009 - Hot Danish
- 2008 - Judged
- 2007 - race not held
- 2006 - Coolroom Candidate
- 2005 - Fumble
- 2004 - Besame Mucho
- 2003 - Classy Dane
- 2002 - Mica's Pride
- 2001 - La Rieuse
- 2000 - Spinning Hill
- 1999 - Brief Kiss
- 1998 - Dantelah
- 1997 - Unison
- 1996 - Fiddlestick

== See also ==
- Colin Stephen Quality Handicap
- Golden Rose
- Shannon Stakes
- List of Australian Group races
- Group races
