= Premiere Stakes =

- Class: Group 2
- Location: Randwick Racecourse, Sydney, Australia
- Inaugurated: 1972
- Race type: Thoroughbred - flat
- Sponsor: Precise Air (2026)

Race information
- Distance: 1,200 metres
- Surface: Turf
- Track: Right-handed
- Qualification: Three year olds and older
- Weight: Weight for Age
- Purse: A$1,000,000 (2026)
- Bonuses: Winner exemption from a ballot on the T J Smith Stakes

The Premiere Stakes is an Australian Turf Club Group 2 Thoroughbred horse race at Weight for Age for three-year-olds and older run over a distance of 1200 metres at Randwick Racecourse, Sydney, Australia.

== History ==
The race originally was scheduled in mid August but after the merging of the Australian Jockey Club and Sydney Turf Club the race was moved in 2011 to early October and is part of the Epsom Handicap racecard.

=== Grade ===
- 1972–1978 - Listed race
- 1979–1996 - Group 3
- 1997 onwards - Group 2

=== Distance ===
- 1972–1975 - 1300 metres
- 1976 onwards - 1200 metres

=== Venue ===
- 1972–1983 - Rosehill Racecourse
- 1984 - Canterbury Park Racecourse
- 1985–1992 - Rosehill Racecourse
- 1993 - Canterbury Park Racecourse
- 1994–2010 - Rosehill Racecourse
- 2011 onwards - Randwick Racecourse

== Winners ==
The following are past winners of the race.

- 2026 - Tempted
- 2025 - Briasa
- 2024 - Airman
- 2023 - Think About It
- 2022 - Lost And Running
- 2021 - Masked Crusader
- 2020 - Libertini
- 2019 - Brutal
- 2018 - Santa Ana Lane
- 2017 - In Her Time
- 2016 - Takedown
- 2015 - Terravista
- 2014 - Famous Seamus
- 2013 - Arinosa
- 2012 - Red Tracer
- 2011 - Neeson
- 2010 - Hot Danish
- 2009 - †Mentality / Kroner
- 2008 - Triple Honour
- 2007 - German Chocolate
- 2006 - Paratroopers
- 2005 - Shania Dane
- 2004 - Spark Of Life
- 2003 - Thorn Park
- 2002 - Century Kid
- 2001 - On Type
- 2000 - Mr. Innocent
- 1999 - Mr. Innocent
- 1998 - Masked Party
- 1997 - King Ivor
- 1996 - Legal Agent
- 1995 - Light Up The World
- 1994 - Stormy Regent
- 1993 - Klokka
- 1992 - Joanne
- 1991 - Joanne
- 1990 - Integra
- 1989 - High Regard
- 1988 - Sky Chase
- 1987 - Campaign King
- 1986 - Imperial Baron
- 1985 - Avon Angel
- 1984 - March Magic
- 1983 - Emancipation
- 1982 - Latin Saint
- 1981 - Kingston Town
- 1980 - Silver Wraith
- 1979 - Salaam
- 1978 - Monakea
- 1977 - Makara
- 1976 - Purple Patch
- 1975 - Go Mod
- 1974 - Favoured
- 1973 - Zambari
- 1972 - Outback

† Dead heat

== See also ==
- List of Australian Group races
- Group races
