= H E Tancred Stakes =

Horse race in Sydney, Australia

- Class: Group 1
- Location: Rosehill Gardens Racecourse
- Inaugurated: 1963 (as HE Tancred Cup)
- Race type: Thoroughbred
- Sponsor: Kia (2018-26)

Race information
- Distance: 2,400 metres
- Surface: Turf
- Qualification: Three year old and older
- Weight: Weight for Age
- Purse: $1,500,000 (2026)
- Bonuses: Exempt from ballot in the Queen Elizabeth Stakes and Sydney Cup

H E Tancred Stakes is an Australian Turf Club Group 1 Weight for Age Thoroughbred horse race for horses three years old and older, run over 2,400 metres at Rosehill Gardens Racecourse in Sydney, Australia.

== History ==
The race is named after Henry Eugene Tancred (1897–1961), a former chairman of the Sydney Turf Club.

=== Name ===
This race has had several names in its existence:

- 1963–1976 - H E Tancred Cup
- 1977–1980 - H E Tancred Stakes
- 1980 - Breville Tancred Stakes
- 1981–1986 - Bowater-Scott Tancred Stakes
- 1987 - Bowater Tancred Stakes
- 1988–1989 - Tancred International Stakes
- 1990 - The BMW International
- 1991–1995 - The BMW
- 1996–2001 - Mercedes Classic
- 2002–2017 - The BMW
- 2018 onwards - KIA Tancred Stakes

=== Distance ===
- 1963 - 1 1/2 miles (~2400 metres)
- 1964 - 1 1/4 miles (~2000 metres)
- 1965–1972 - 1 1/2 miles (~2400 metres)
- 1973 onwards - 2400 metres

=== Conditions ===
- 1963–1976 - Quality Handicap
- 1977 onwards - Weight for Age

=== Grade ===
- 1963–1979 - Principal race
- 1980 onwards - Group 1 race

=== Venue ===
- 2022 - Newcastle Racecourse

== Winners ==
The following are past winners of the race.

- 2026 - Aeliana
- 2025 - Dubai Honour
- 2024 - Kalapour
- 2023 - Arapaho
- 2022 - Duais
- 2021 - Sir Dragonet
- 2020 - Verry Elleegant
- 2019 - Avilius
- 2018 - Almandin
- 2017 - Jameka
- 2016 - Preferment
- 2015 - Hartnell
- 2014 - Silent Achiever
- 2013 - Fiveandahalfstar
- 2012 - Manighar
- 2011 - Cedarberg
- 2010 - Littorio
- 2009 - Fiumicino
- 2008 - Tuesday Joy
- 2007 - Blutigeroo
- 2006 - Eremein
- 2005 - Makybe Diva
- 2004 - Grand Zulu
- 2003 - Freemason
- 2002 - Ethereal
- 2001 - Curata Storm
- 2000 - Tie the Knot
- 1999 - Tie the Knot
- 1998 - Might and Power
- 1997 - Octagonal
- 1996 - Octagonal
- 1995 - Stony Bay
- 1994 - Miltak
- 1993 - Kaaptive Edition
- 1992 - Heroicity
- 1991 - Dr. Grace
- 1990 - Sydeston
- 1989 - Our Poetic Prince
- 1988 - Beau Zam
- 1987 - Myocard
- 1986 - Bonecrusher
- 1985 - Alibhai
- 1984 - Hayai
- 1983 - Trissaro
- 1982 - Prince Majestic
- 1981 - Blue Denim
- 1980 - Kingston Town
- 1979 - Shivaree
- 1978 - Hyperno
- 1977 - Our Cavalier
- 1976 - Major Battle
- 1975 - Sovereign Yacht
- 1974 - Knee High
- 1973 - Apollo Eleven (NZ)
- 1972 - Tails
- 1971 - Natural Trump
- 1970 - Bright Shadow
- 1969 - Prince Grant
- 1968 - Khalekan
- 1967 - Indian Harvest
- 1966 - Striking Force
- 1965 - Galerus
- 1964 - King Roto
- 1963 - Maidenhead

== See also ==
- T L Baillieu Handicap
- Doncaster Prelude
- Emancipation Stakes
- Neville Sellwood Stakes
- Star Kingdom Stakes
- Tulloch Stakes
- Vinery Stud Stakes
- List of Australian Group races
- Group races
