= Theo Marks Stakes =

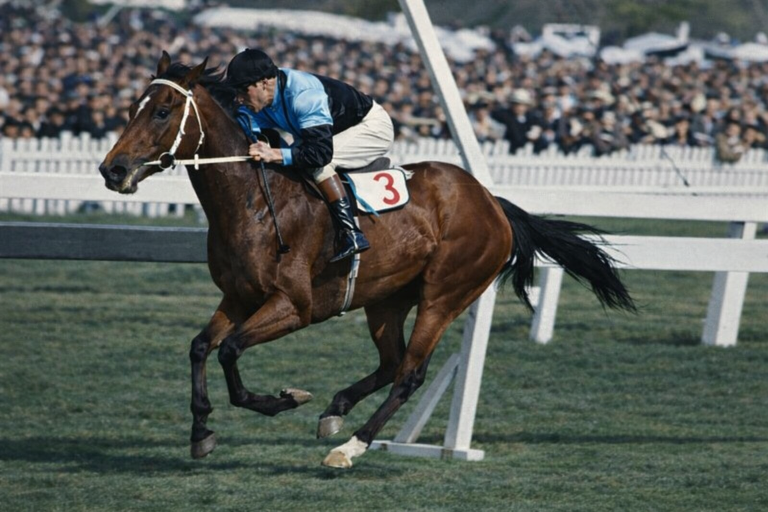
- Shannon, 1946 winner
- Class: Group 2
- Location: Rosehill Racecourse, Sydney, Australia
- Inaugurated: 1946
- Race type: Thoroughbred - flat
- Sponsor: Toyota Forklifts (2023-2026)

Race information
- Distance: 1,300 metres
- Surface: Turf
- Track: Right-handed
- Qualification: Three year old and older
- Weight: Quality handicap
- Purse: A$300,000 (2026)
- Bonuses: Exempt from ballot in the Epsom Handicap

The Theo Marks Stakes is an Australian Turf Club Group 2 Thoroughbred quality handicap horse race, for horses aged three years old and older, over a distance of 1300 metres, held annually at Rosehill Racecourse, Sydney, Australia in September.

== History ==
The race is named after Theodore John Marks, architect and chairman of the Rosehill Racing Club (1919-41).

=== Name ===
- 2010–2013 – Sebring Sprint.
- 2014 onwards – Theo Marks Stakes

=== Grade ===
- 1946–1978 – Principal Race
- 1979 onwards – Group 2

=== Distance ===
- 1946–1972 – 7 furlongs (~1400 metres)
- 1973–1984 – 1400 metres
- 1985–1990 – 1300 metres
- 1991 – 1280 metres
- 1992–2008 – 1300 metres
- 2009–2010 – 1400 metres
- 2011 – 1300 metres
- 2012–2014 – 1400 metres
- 2015 onwards – 1300 metres

=== Other venues ===
- 1991 - Canterbury Racecourse
- 2021 - Kembla Grange Racecourse

== Winners ==
The following are past winners of the race.

- 2026 - Skyhook
- 2025 - Autumn Glow
- 2024 - Encap
- 2023 - Golden Mile
- 2022 - Kiku
- 2021 - Chat
- 2020 - Wild Planet
- 2019 - Arcadia Queen
- 2018 - Home Of The Brave
- 2017 - Deploy
- 2016 - Mackintosh
- 2015 - Winx
- 2014 - Cluster
- 2013 - Riva De Lago
- 2012 - Ambidexter
- 2011 - Master Of Design
- 2010 - More Joyous
- 2009 - Racing To Win
- 2008 - Hurried Choice
- 2007 - †race not held
- 2006 - Racing To Win
- 2005 - Paratroopers
- 2004 - Falkirk
- 2003 - Fiery Venture
- 2002 - Defier
- 2001 - Shogun Lodge
- 2000 - Hire
- 1999 - Adam
- 1998 - Pleasure Giver
- 1997 - Catalan Opening
- 1996 - Mamzelle Pedrille
- 1995 - Ivory's Irish
- 1994 - Rouslan
- 1993 - Double Your Bet
- 1992 - Final Card
- 1991 - Joanne
- 1990 - Alquoz
- 1989 - From The Planet
- 1988 - Targlish
- 1987 - Groucho
- 1986 - Zip Home
- 1985 - Vari's Ace
- 1984 - Inspired
- 1983 - Another Phenomenon
- 1982 - Ksar Royal
- 1981 - Arbogast
- 1980 - Silver Wraith
- 1979 - Scomeld
- 1978 - Party's Pride
- 1977 - Blockbuster
- 1976 - Ease The Squeeze
- 1975 - Summer Fantasy
- 1974 - Purple Patch
- 1973 - I'm Scarlet
- 1972 - Beaches
- 1971 - Crown Law
- 1970 - Ricochet
- 1969 - Nausori
- 1968 - Gay Gauntlet
- 1967 - Cabochon
- 1966 - Time And Tide
- 1965 - Time And Tide
- 1964 - Game Prince
- 1963 - Time And Tide
- 1962 - Bush Belle
- 1961 - Martello Towers
- 1960 - French Descent
- 1959 - In Love
- 1958 - Gay Port
- 1957 - Teranyan
- 1956 - French Charm
- 1955 - Hans
- 1954 - Sunny Hour
- 1953 - Carioca
- 1952 - Tossing
- 1951 - Bankbrook
- 1950 - Donegal
- 1949 - Hisign
- 1948 - The Groom
- 1947 - Murray Stream
- 1946 - Shannon

† Not held because of outbreak of equine influenza

== See also ==
- Ming Dynasty Quality Handicap
- Sheraco Stakes
- The Run To The Rose
- List of Australian Group races
- Group races
