= Vinery Stud Stakes =

Vinery Stud Stakes registered as Storm Queen Stakes
- Class: Group 1
- Location: Rosehill Gardens Racecourse
- Inaugurated: 1979
- Race type: Thoroughbred – Flat racing
- Sponsor: Vinery Stud (2009-26)

Race information
- Distance: 2,000 metres
- Surface: Turf
- Track: Right-handed
- Qualification: Three-year-old fillies
- Weight: Set weights
- Purse: A$750,000 (2026)
- Bonuses: Exempt from ballot in Australian Oaks

The Vinery Stud Stakes, registered as the Storm Queen Stakes, is an Australian Turf Club Group 1 Thoroughbred horse race for three-year-old fillies at set weights run over a distance of 2,000 metres at Rosehill Gardens Racecourse, Sydney, Australia.

== History ==
The race was named in honour of Storm Queen, the winner of the 1966 Golden Slipper Stakes. The race is the main lead-up race for the Australian Oaks.

=== Name ===
- 1979–1991: Storm Queen Stakes
- 1992–2001: Ansett Australia Stakes
- 2002–2008: Arrowfield Stud Stakes
- 2009: Vinery Stud Storm Queen Stakes
- 2010–2013: Vinery Stud Stakes

=== Distance ===
- 1979: 1900 metres
- 1980–2021: 2000 metres
- 2022: 1850 metres
- 2023 onwards – 2000 metres

=== Grade ===
- 1979: Principal race
- 1980–1992: Group 2
- 1993–present: - Group 1

=== Venue ===
- 2022 - Newcastle Racecourse

=== Recent multiple winners ===
Jockeys

- Hugh Bowman in 2013, 2014 and 2022.

Trainers

- Roger James in 2002 and with Robert Wellwood in 2023 and 2024
- Chris Waller in 2019, 2021 and 2022
- Gai Waterhouse in 2001 and 2003 and with Adrian Bott in 2020.

== Winners ==
The following are past winners of the race.

- 2026 - Belle Cheval
- 2025 - Treasurethe Moment
- 2024 - Orchestral
- 2023 - Prowess
- 2022 - Fangirl
- 2021 - Hungry Heart
- 2020 - Shout The Bar
- 2019 - Verry Elleegant
- 2018 - Hiyaam
- 2017 - Montoya's Secret
- 2016 - Single Gaze
- 2015 - Fenway
- 2014 - Lucia Valentina
- 2013 - Norzita
- 2012 - Mosheen
- 2011 - Mirjulisa Lass
- 2010 - Faint Perfume
- 2009 - Purple
- 2008 - Heavenly Glow
- 2007 - Miss Finland
- 2006 - Serenade Rose
- 2005 - Hollow Bullet
- 2004 - Special Harmony
- 2003 - Shower Of Roses
- 2002 - Sixty Seconds
- 2001 - Tempest Morn
- 2000 - Hill Of Grace
- 1999 - Savannah Success
- 1998 - Champagne
- 1997 - Danendri
- 1996 - Saleous
- 1995 - Northwood Plume
- 1994 - Alcove
- 1993 - Slight Chance
- 1992 - Electrique
- 1991 - All Mine
- 1990 - A Little Kiss
- 1989 - Research
- 1988 - Tennessee Vain
- 1987 - Appreciation
- 1986 - English Mint
- 1985 - Centaurea
- 1984 - Lotka's Star
- 1983 - English Wonder
- 1982 - Sheraco
- 1981 - Evening Mist
- 1980 - Lady Capri
- 1979 - Impede

== See also ==
- T L Baillieu Handicap
- Doncaster Prelude
- Emancipation Stakes
- Neville Sellwood Stakes
- Star Kingdom Stakes
- H E Tancred Stakes
- Tulloch Stakes
- List of Australian Group races
- Group races
