= In Secret (horse) =

Australian thoroughbred racehorse

- Racing Silks of Godolphin
- Sire: I Am Invincible
- Grandsire: Invincible Spirit
- Dam: Eloping
- Damsire: Choisir
- Sex: Mare
- Foaled: 2 September 2019
- Country: Australia
- Colour: Bay
- Breeder: Segenhoe Thoroughbreds Australia
- Owner: Godolphin
- Trainer: James Cummings
- Record: 15: 6-3-3
- Earnings: A$5,283,100

Major wins
- The Run To The Rose (2022); Coolmore Stud Stakes (2022); Light Fingers Stakes (2023); Newmarket Handicap (2023)

Awards
- Australian Champion Three Year Old Filly (2023)

In Secret (foaled 2 September 2019) is a retired multiple Group 1 winning Australian Thoroughbred racehorse and broodmare.

== Background ==
In Secret was bred by Longwood Thoroughbred Farm and Segenhoe Stud and consigned for sale at the 2021 Magic Millions sale. She was the only horse purchased at these sales by Godolphin for $900,000. In Secret's broodmare, Eloping, won over $1 million in her racing career, culminating with Group 3 victories in the Keith Mackay Handicap and Champagne Stakes.

== Racing career ==
In Secret had her first race start at Scone Racecourse on the 14 May 2022 in the Woodlands Stakes. She won the race comfortably when ridden by Hugh Bowman, who stated after the race, "She has got a bit of a class edge on this lot, and she is certainly up to better things."

After running second at her next start in the Silver Slipper Stakes, In Secret next contested The Run To The Rose which she won by 1.5 lengths. In Secret then ran second in the Golden Rose Stakes before winning the Group 1 Coolmore Stud Stakes at Flemington Racecourse when ridden by James McDonald.

In July 2024 it was announced In Secret would be retired from racing and begin breeding duties due to a suspensory ligament injury in her right foreleg.

== Pedigree ==
Pedigree of In Secret (AUS) 2019
Sire I Am Invincible (AUS) 2004	Invincible Spirit (IRE); 1997	Green Desert	Danzig
Sire I Am Invincible (AUS) 2004	Invincible Spirit (IRE); 1997	Green Desert	Foreign Courier
Sire I Am Invincible (AUS) 2004	Invincible Spirit (IRE); 1997	Rafha	Kris
Sire I Am Invincible (AUS) 2004	Invincible Spirit (IRE); 1997	Rafha	Eljazzi
Sire I Am Invincible (AUS) 2004	Cannarelle (AUS); 1998	Canny Lad	Bletchingly
Sire I Am Invincible (AUS) 2004	Cannarelle (AUS); 1998	Canny Lad	Jesmond Lass
Sire I Am Invincible (AUS) 2004	Cannarelle (AUS); 1998	Countess Pedrille	Zoffany
Sire I Am Invincible (AUS) 2004	Cannarelle (AUS); 1998	Countess Pedrille	Sister Pedrille
Dam Eloping (AUS) 2011	Choisir (AUS); 1999	Danehill Dancer	Danehill
Dam Eloping (AUS) 2011	Choisir (AUS); 1999	Danehill Dancer	Mira Adonde
Dam Eloping (AUS) 2011	Choisir (AUS); 1999	Great Selection	Lunchtime
Dam Eloping (AUS) 2011	Choisir (AUS); 1999	Great Selection	Pensive Mood
Dam Eloping (AUS) 2011	Runaway Jesse (AUS); 1992	Rory's Jester	Crown Jester
Dam Eloping (AUS) 2011	Runaway Jesse (AUS); 1992	Rory's Jester	Rory’s Rocket
Dam Eloping (AUS) 2011	Runaway Jesse (AUS); 1992	Runaway Babe	Semipalatinsk
Dam Eloping (AUS) 2011	Runaway Jesse (AUS); 1992	Runaway Babe	Zac Sky
