= Widden Stakes =

- Class: Group 3
- Location: Rosehill Racecourse
- Inaugurated: 1943
- Race type: Thoroughbred - flat

Race information
- Distance: 1,100 metres
- Surface: Turf
- Track: Right-handed
- Qualification: Two year old fillies
- Weight: Set weights with penalties
- Purse: A$250,000 (2026)

The Widden Stakes is an Australian Turf Club Group 3 Thoroughbred horse race, for two-year-old fillies, held with set weights with penalties conditions, over a distance of 1100 metres at Rosehill Racecourse in Sydney, Australia in January or February.

== History ==
=== Name ===
The race is named after Widden Stud, where many of Australia's champion thoroughbreds have stood.

Three fillies have captured the Widden Stakes – Golden Slipper Stakes double:

- Overreach (2013)
- Mossfun (2014)
- Lady of Camelot (2024)

=== Distance ===
- 1943–1972 - 5 furlongs (~1000 metres)
- 1973–2004 - 1000 metres
- 2005–2007 - 1100 metres
- 2008 - 1000 metres
- 2009 onwards - 1100 metres

=== Grade ===
- 1943–1978 - Principal Race
- 1979–2013 - Listed Race
- 2014 onwards - Group 3

=== Venue ===
- 1943–2004 - Randwick Racecourse
- 2005–2007 - Rosehill Gardens Racecourse
- 2008–2011 - Randwick Racecourse
- 2012 - Warwick Farm Racecourse
- 2013–2019 - Rosehill Gardens Racecourse
- 2020 - Randwick Racecourse
- 2021 onwards - Rosehill Gardens Racecourse

== Winners ==
Past winners of the race are as follows.

- 2026 - Chilly Girl
- 2025 - The Playwright
- 2024 - Lady Of Camelot
- 2023 - Learning To Fly
- 2022 - Queen Of The Ball
- 2021 - Mallory
- 2020 - Away Game
- 2019 - Amercement
- 2018 - Fiesta
- 2017 - Teaspoon
- 2016 - Honesty Prevails
- 2015 - Fireworks
- 2014 - Mossfun
- 2013 - Overreach
- 2012 - Driefontein
- 2011 - Satin Shoes
- 2010 - Georgette Silk
- 2009 - Horizons
- 2008 - Delta Girl
- 2007 - Superfly
- 2006 - Churchill Downs
- 2005 - Pasikatera
- 2004 - Econsul
- 2003 - race not held
- 2002 - Secret Land
- 2001 - Riona
- 2000 - Miss Bussell
- 1999 - Miss Thunderstood
- 1998 - Countess Christie
- 1997 - Manana
- 1996 - Empower
- 1995 - Unison
- 1994 - Stitches
- 1993 - Dynasty
- 1992 - Lilting
- 1991 - Merry Shade
- 1990 - Bundle Of Thanks
- 1989 - Triscay
- 1988 - Momentaire
- 1987 - Kazarne
- 1986 - Whilodge
- 1985 - Magic Flute
- 1984 - Super Swift
- 1983 - Rivage
- 1982 - Biscarina
- 1981 - Surpassing
- 1980 - Flight Of Life
- 1979 - Shaybisc
- 1978 - Golden Topic
- 1977 - Peeping
- 1976 - †Princess Talaria / Lady Lyndal
- 1975 - Rainbeam
- 1974 - Denise's Joy
- 1973 - Gretel
- 1972 - Magic Beam
- 1971 - Blue Mountain
- 1970 - Royal Endeavour
- 1969 - †Summer Play / Final Bid
- 1968 - Celina
- 1967 - Topmost
- 1966 - On Par
- 1965 - Red Mittens
- 1964 - Suzanne
- 1963 - All Gold
- 1962 - Heirloom
- 1961 - April Wonder
- 1960 - No Match
- 1959 - My Rachael
- 1958 - Chateau Clair
- 1957 - Foison
- 1956 - Estrina
- 1955 - Royal Maureen
- 1954 - Interesting
- 1953 - Queen Of All
- 1952 - Reflected Glory
- 1951 - Celebrated
- 1950 - White Lightning
- 1949 - Magic Carpet
- 1948 - Pantomime
- 1947 - Oasis
- 1946 - Kindly Light
- 1945 - race not held
- 1944 - Genista
- 1943 - Birthright

† Run in divisions

== See also ==
- List of Australian Group races
- Group races
