= Grand Zulu =

Australian-bred Thoroughbred racehorse

Grand Zulu (勁將軍) was an Australian Thoroughbred racehorse. A bay gelding foaled on 19 September 2000 in Australia he was sired by Grand Lodge (USA), a son of Chief's Crown, and out of dam Bravo Zulu (48 starts, $96,900) by Military Plume (NZ).

In 2004, he defeated a number of top Australian stayers including Mummify, Makybe Diva and Elvstroem, to win the Group One The BMW Stakes in record time. After the race, his breeder and owner David Choy decided to withdraw Grand Zulu from the AJC Derby and sent him to Hong Kong on 16 August 2004. Grand Zulu did not win a race from six starts in Hong Kong, including the Hong Kong Derby. He was initially retired from racing in 2005, but was returned to Australia on 9 May 2005 for the 2006 Spring Carnival. He was back with Australian trainer Gwenda Markwell. He ran third to Desert War and Eremein in the 1,900m Hill Stakes against a very handy field at Rosehill Racecourse.

He had his last start on 22 November 2008 at Randwick when he ran last in field of eight. Racing record: 37: 4-5-3 Prizemoney: $1,861,547.
