= Magic Night Stakes =

- Class: Group 3
- Location: Rosehill Racecourse
- Inaugurated: 1975
- Race type: Thoroughbred - flat
- Sponsor: TRESemmé (2026)

Race information
- Distance: 1,200 metres
- Surface: Turf
- Track: Right-handed
- Qualification: Two year old fillies
- Weight: Set weights 55 1/2 kg
- Purse: A$250,000 (2026)
- Bonuses: Exempt from ballot for the Golden Slipper Stakes (if nominated)

The Magic Night Stakes is an Australian Turf Club Group 3 Thoroughbred horse race, for two-year-old fillies, at set weights, over a distance of 1200 metres, held annually at Rosehill Racecourse in Sydney, Australia in March.

== History ==
The race is named in honour of Magic Night, winner of the 1961 Golden Slipper Stakes.

For the 2016 running the race was named in honour of trainer Bede Murray who died a week before the race.

Five fillies have captured the Magic Night – Golden Slippers double:

- Toy Show (1975)
- Dark Eclipse (1980)
- Bounding Away (1986)
- Bint Marscay (1993) and
- Kiamichi (2019).

Recent multiple winners include:

- James McDonald in 2016, 2020, 2021 and 2026.

Trainers

- James Cummings in 2019, 2020 and 2021.
- Peter Snowden in 2008, 2011, 2024 (with Paul Snowden) and 2025.

=== Name ===
- 1975–1984 - Magic Night Quality Handicap
- 1985–1988 - Magic Night Quality Stakes
- 1989 onwards - Magic Night Stakes

=== Grade ===
- 1975–1979 - Principal Race
- 1979–1986 - Listed Race
- 1980–1985 - Group 3
- 1986–2016 - Group 2
- 2017 - Group 3

== Winners ==
The following are past winners of the race.

- 2026 - Pembrey
- 2025 - Memo
- 2024 - Drfiting
- 2023 - Steel City
- 2022 - She's Extreme
- 2021 - Arcaded
- 2020 - Thermosphere
- 2019 - Kiamichi
- 2018 - Sunlight
- 2017 - Tulip
- 2016 - Calliope
- 2015 - Speak Fondly
- 2014 - Bring Me The Maid
- 2013 - Scandiva
- 2012 - Ichihara
- 2011 - Altar
- 2010 - Willow Creek
- 2009 - Indian Ocean
- 2008 - Portillo
- 2007 - Downhill Racer
- 2006 - Gold Edition
- 2005 - Media
- 2004 - Alizes
- 2003 - Shamekha
- 2002 - Victory Vein
- 2001 - Hosannah
- 2000 - Preserve
- 1999 - Countess Christie
- 1998 - Mardi's Magic
- 1997 - Regal Chamber
- 1996 - Precious Glitter
- 1995 - Pontal Lass
- 1994 - Romantica
- 1993 - Bint Marscay
- 1992 - Klokka
- 1991 - Pipiwar
- 1990 - Draw Card
- 1989 - Fickle Hostess
- 1988 - Comely Girl
- 1987 - Tennessee Vain
- 1986 - Bounding Away
- 1985 - Ma Chiquita
- 1984 - Pashenka's Gem
- 1983 - Lady Eclipse
- 1982 - Explicit
- 1981 - Food For Love
- 1980 - Dark Eclipse
- 1979 - Century Miss
- 1978 - Jubilee Walk
- 1977 - Lloyd Boy
- 1976 - †As You Like It / Glen Vain
- 1975 - Toy Show

† Race run in Divisions

== See also ==
- List of Australian Group races
- Group races
