= Rosehill Gardens Racecourse =

Horse racecourse in New South Wales, Australia

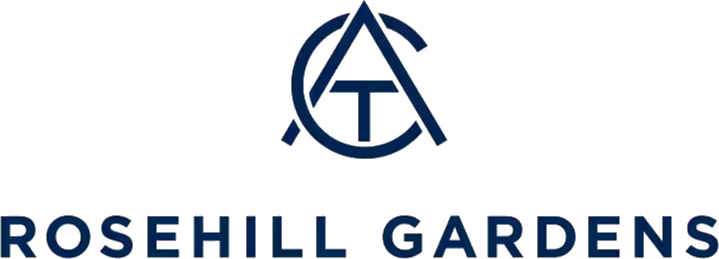

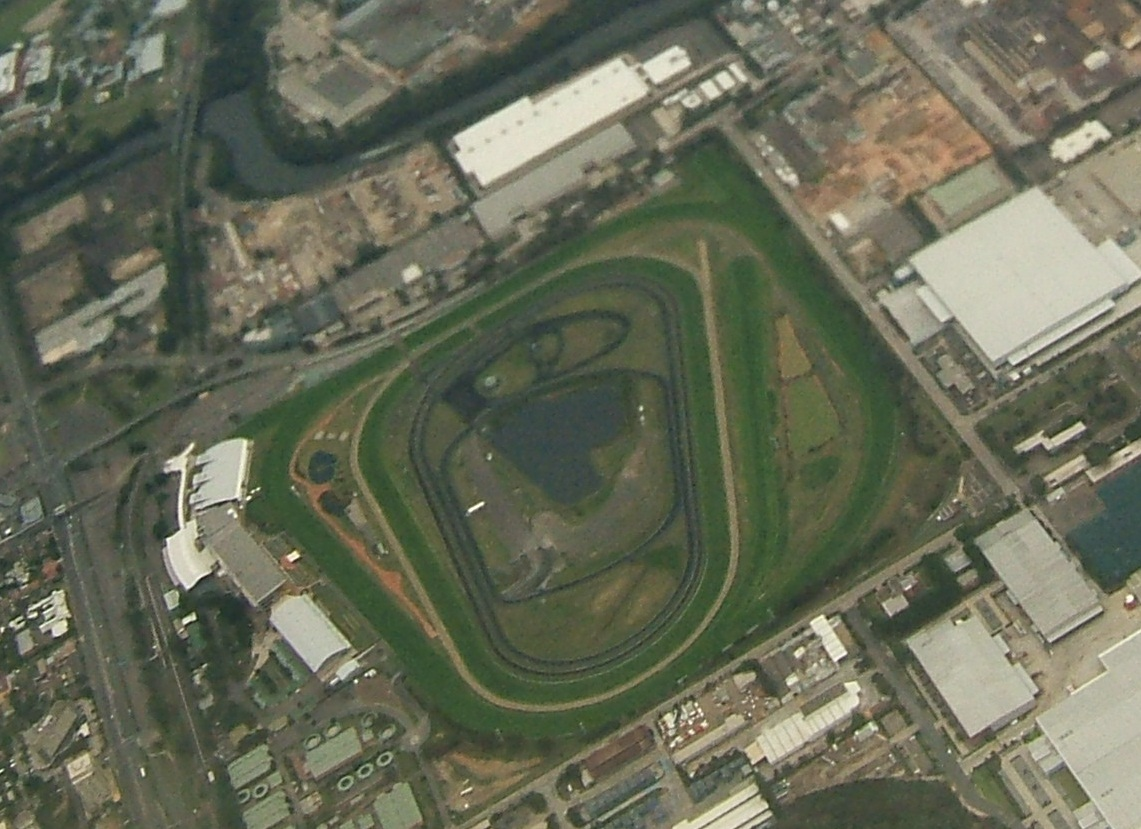
- Rosehill Gardens Racecourse from above in 2010
- Interactive map of Rosehill Gardens Racecourse
- Location: Rosehill, New South Wales, Australia
- Coordinates: 33°49′27″S 151°01′36″E
- Owned by: Australian Turf Club
- Date opened: 1885
- Notable races: Golden Slipper Stakes

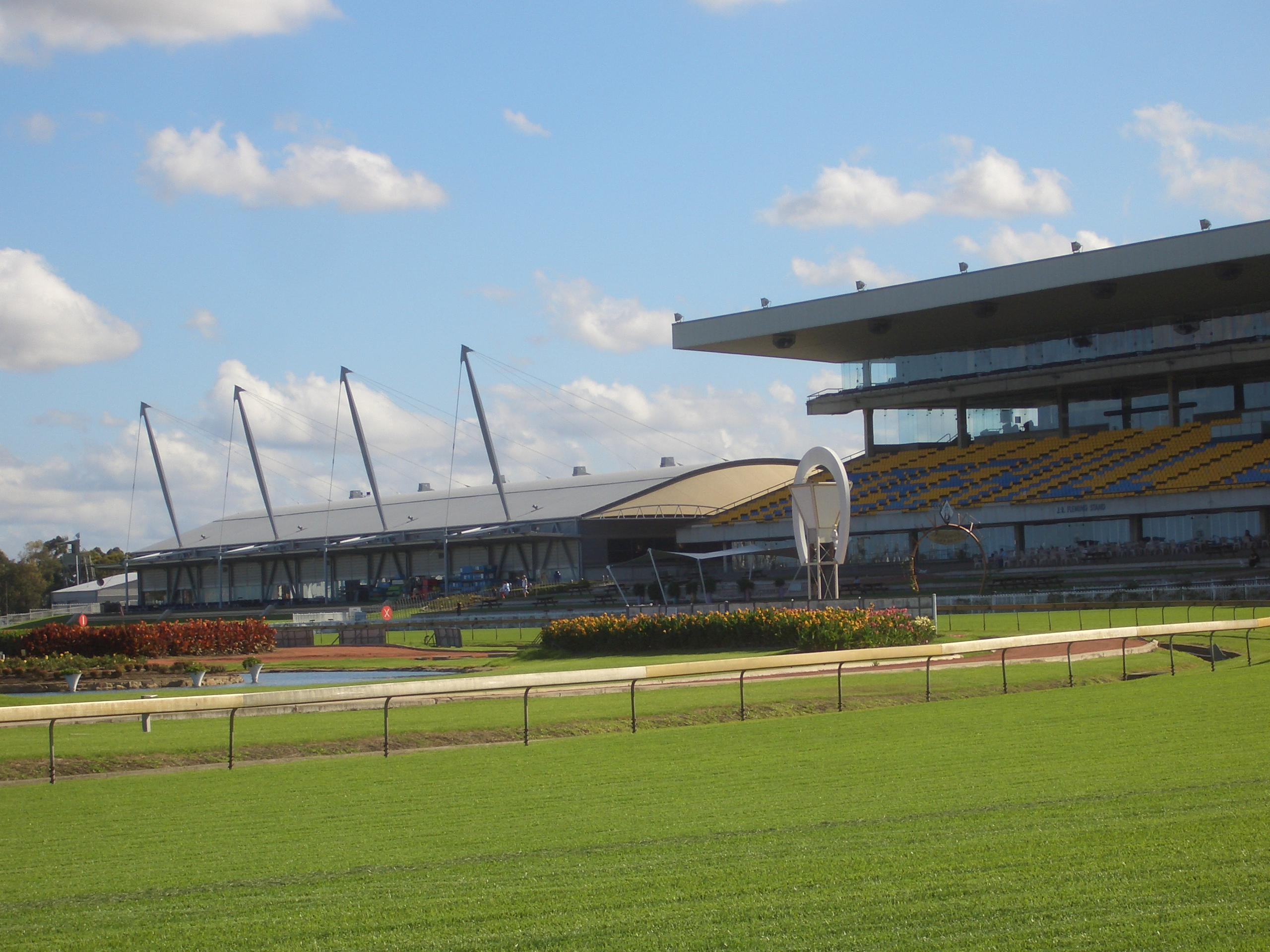
Rosehill Gardens Racecourse

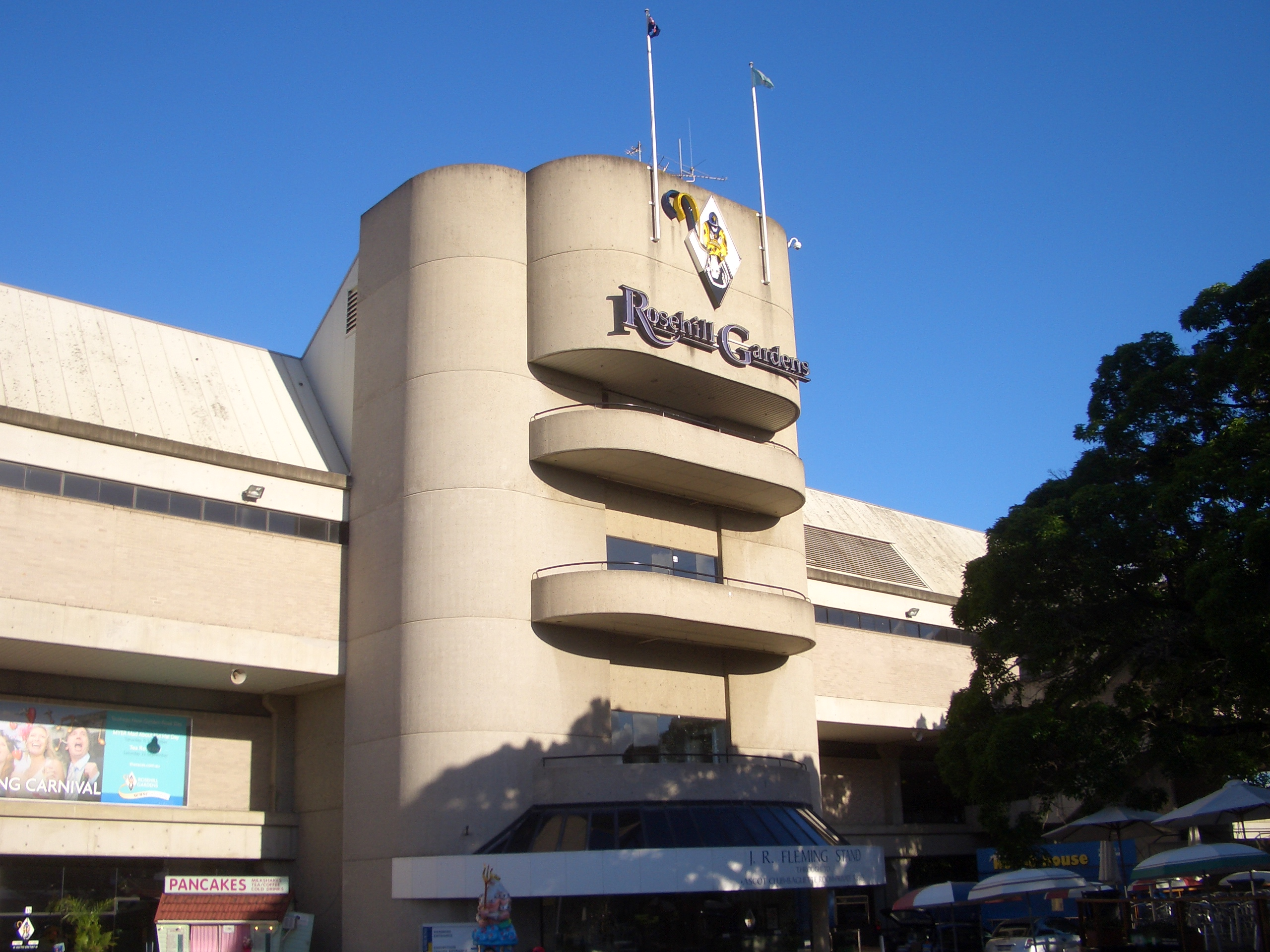
Rosehill Gardens Racecourse stand

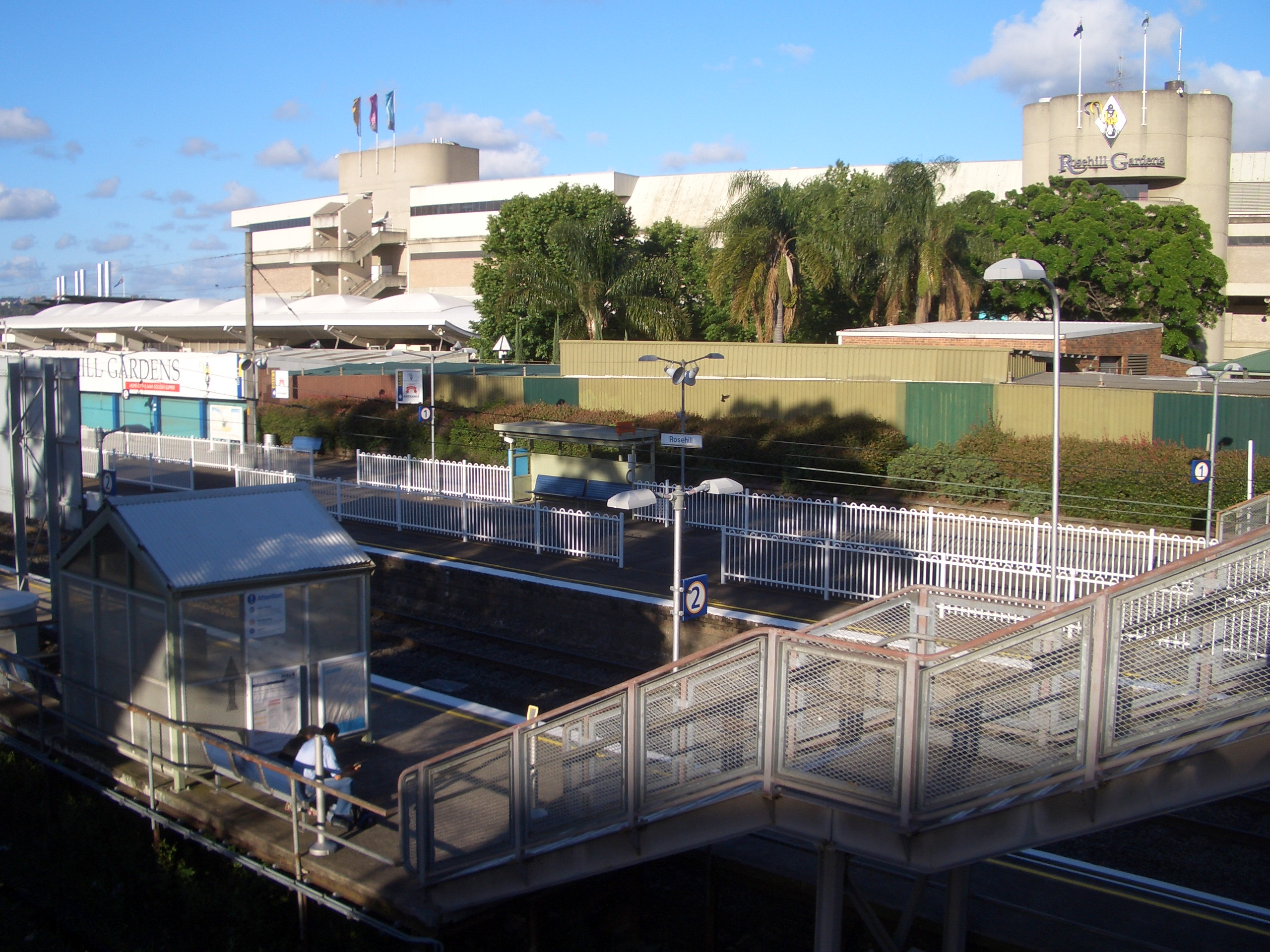
Rosehill railway station

The Rosehill Gardens Racecourse is located in the Sydney suburb of Rosehill, New South Wales, Australia. It is operated by the Australian Turf Club. Rosehill holds horse races for thoroughbred gallopers on a grass surface. It is one of the two premier racecourses in Sydney, the other one being Randwick Racecourse. One of the main events held at Rosehill is the Golden Slipper race for two-year-olds. The track has a circumference of 2,048 metres (6,719 ft) with a home straight of 408 metres (1,339 ft).

== History ==
John Bennett purchased a large section of Rosehill to construct a racecourse and recreation area. Construction started in 1883 and was completed in April 1885 for a grand total of £12,000. Bennett constructed a private railway line connecting the racecourse to the main line located at Clyde which opened on 17 November 1888.

From 1943, Rosehill Gardens Racecourse was managed by the Sydney Turf Club and remained so until 2011. In 2011, the Sydney Turf Club and Australian Jockey Club combined to become the Australian Turf Club. The Australian Turf Club are the current owners and operators of Rosehill Gardens Racecourse.

In December 2023, it was announced that the Australian Turf Club and Government of New South Wales were in negotiations to close Rosehill Racecourse by the end of the 2020s with the site to be redeveloped for around 25,000 new homes with a new Sydney Metro West station. Funds would be spent on rebuilding Warwick Farm and Royal Randwick, as well as building a new horse training facility at Horsley Park. The proposal was rejected in May 2025 by a membership vote of 56.1% against compared to 43.9% in favour.

== Races ==
The following is a list of Group races which are run at Rosehill Racecourse.

Grp	Race Name	Age	Sex	Weight	Distance	Date
1	Golden Slipper Stakes	2YO	Open	sw	1200	April
1	George Ryder Stakes	Open	Open	wfa	1500	April
1	Ranvet Stakes	Open	Open	wfa	2000	March
1	Rosehill Guineas	3YO	Open	sw	2000	March
1	Vinery Stud Stakes	3YO	Fillies	sw	2000	April
1	Coolmore Classic	Open	F&M	qlty	1500	March
1	Tancred Stakes	Open	Open	wfa	2400	April
1	The Galaxy	Open	Open	hcp	1100	March
1	Golden Rose Stakes	3YO	Open	sw	1400	September
2	Ajax Stakes	Open	Open	qlty	1500	March
2	Hobartville Stakes	3YO	Open	sw	1400	March
2	Magic Night Stakes	2YO	Fillies	sw	1200	March
2	Pago Pago Stakes	2YO	C&G	sw	1200	March
2	Phar Lap Stakes	3YO	Open	sw	1500	March
2	Reisling Stakes	2YO	Fillies	sw	1200	March
2	Shannon Stakes	3YO+	Open	qlty	1500	September
2	Silver Slipper Stakes	2YO	Open	sw	1100	February
2	Tea Rose Stakes	3YO	Fillies	sw	1500	September
2	Theo Marks Stakes	3YO+	Open	qlty	1300	September
2	Stan Fox Stakes	3YO	Open	sw	1500	September
2	Todman Stakes	2YO	C&G	sw	1200	March
2	Tulloch Stakes	3YO	C&G	sw	2000	April
3	Canonbury Stakes	2YO	C&G	sw+p	1100	February
3	Widden Stakes	2YO	Fillies	sw+p	1100	March
3	Birthday Card Stakes	3YO+	F&M	qlty	1200	March
3	Neville Sellwood Stakes	3YO+	Open	sw+p	2000	March
3	N E Manion Cup	3YO+	Open	qlty	2400	March
3	Concorde Stakes	3YO+	Open	qlty	1100	August
3	San Domenico Stakes	3YO	Open	sw	1100	August
3	Gloaming Stakes	3YO	Open	sw	1800	September
3	Kingston Town Stakes	3YO+	Open	hcp	2000	September
3	Millie Fox Stakes	Open	F&M	qlty	1300	February
3	Missile Stakes	Open	Open	wfa	1100	August
3	Research Stakes	3YO+	F&M	qlty	1200	September
3	The Run to the Rose	3YO	Open	sw+p	1200	September
3	Star Kingdom Stakes	Open	Open	qlty	1100	March
3	Rosehill Gold Cup	3YO+	Open	qlty hcp	2000	November
