= New Zealand Derby (Riccarton) =

- Class: Group I
- Location: Riccarton Park Racecourse; Christchurch, New Zealand
- Inaugurated: 1860
- Race type: Thoroughbred - Flat racing
- Website: Riccarton Park

Race information
- Distance: 12 furlongs
- Surface: Turf
- Track: Left-handed
- Qualification: Three-year-olds
- Weight: Set-Weights

The New Zealand Derby was a set-weights thoroughbred horse race for three-year-old horses run over a distance of 2400m at Riccarton Racecourse in Christchurch, New Zealand. The inaugural running of the Derby was in 1860, when racing was held at Riccarton Racecourse. The race was one of the two main races for three-year-olds in New Zealand, the other being the Great Northern Derby at Ellerslie.

The New Zealand Derby at Riccarton was won by three of the New Zealand Racing Hall of Fame horses:

- Gloaming
- Nightmarch
- Desert Gold.

The two races were effectively combined into one from 1973, again using the name the New Zealand Derby. However the race was moved from Christchurch to Auckland at Ellerslie Racecourse. The Great Northern Derby was also discontinued.

Two new 1600m races for three-year-olds were then started in Christchurch in place of its Derby, the One Thousand and Two Thousand Guineas. These are raced during Christchurch/Canterbury New Zealand Cup Week.

== Winners (1960 onwards) ==
The following are the most recent winners of the race.

Year	Horse	Sex	Sire	Dam	Dam Sire
1972	Classic Wave	f	Crest of the Wave (GB)	Tolunda	Talismano (ITY)
1971	Master John	c	Even Stevens	Lover Girl (NZ)	Revelation (GB)
1970	Fairview Lad	c	Battle-Waggon (GB)	Seldom In	Le Filou (FR)
1969	Piko	c	Ayrshire Bard (IRE)	Picco's Pride (NZ)	Pride of Kildare (IRE)
1968	Pep	c	Fair's Fair (GB)	Conquete (GB)	Souverain (FR)
1967	Jazz	f	Roussau's Dream (IRE)	Dixie (NZ)	Finis (GB)
1966	Fair Account	c	Comte de Grasse (USA)	Truly Fair (NZ)	Fair's Fair (GB)
1965	Roman Consul	g	Agricola (GB)	Gipsy Dancer (NZ)	Gilpin (GB)
1964	Trial Offer	f	Byland (GB)	Bonny Loch (NZ)	Balloch (GB)
1963	Royal Duty	c	Gigantic (GB)	Glenlyn (NZ)	Boissier (GB)
1962	Algalon	g	Alonzo (GB)	Alga (NZ)	Faux Tirage (GB)
1961	Burgos	c	Sabaean (GB)	Glad Tidings (NZ)	Beau Vite (NZ)
1960	Blue Lodge	c	Blueskin (GB)	Nimvir (NZ)	Triumvir (GB)

== Earlier winners ==
- 1860 Ada
- 1861 Otto
- 1862 Emmeline
- 1863 Azucena
- 1864 Opera
- 1865 Egremont
- 1866 Nebula
- 1867 Scandal
- 1868 Flying Jib
- 1869 Manuka
- 1870 Envy
- 1871 Defamation
- 1872 Calumny
- 1873 Papapa
- 1874 Tadmor
- 1875 Daniel O'Rourke
- 1876 Songster
- 1877 Trump Card
- 1878 Natator
- 1879 Hornby
- 1880 Sir Modred
- 1881 The Dauphin
- 1882 Cheviot
- 1883 Oudeis
- 1884 Black Rose
- 1885 Stonyhurst
- 1886 Disowned
- 1887 Maxim
- 1888 Manton
- 1889 Scots Grey
- 1890 Medallion
- 1891 Florrie
- 1892 Stepniak
- 1893 Skirmisher
- 1894 Blue Fire
- 1895 Euroclydon
- 1896 Uniform
- 1897 Multiform
- 1898 Altair
- 1899 Seahorse
- 1900 Renown
- 1901 Menschikoff
- 1902 Orloff
- 1903 Roseal
- 1904 Nightfall
- 1905 Noctiform
- 1906 Zimmerman
- 1907 Elevation
- 1908 Husbandman
- 1909 Elysian
- 1910 Danube
- 1911 Masterpiece
- 1912 Bon Reve
- 1913 Cherubini
- 1914 Balboa
- 1915 Desert Gold
- 1916 The Toff
- 1917 Estland
- 1918 Gloaming (AUS)
- 1919 Rossini
- 1920 Duo
- 1921 Winning Hit
- 1922 Enthusiasm
- 1923 Black Ronald
- 1924 Count Cavour
- 1925 Runnymede
- 1926 Commendation
- 1927 Agrion
- 1928 Nightmarch
- 1929 Honour
- 1930 Cylinder
- 1931 Bronze Eagle (AUS)
- 1932 Silver Scorn
- 1933 Nightly
- 1934 Sporting Blood
- 1935 Lowenberg
- 1936 Wild Chase
- 1937 Royal Chief
- 1938 Defaulter
- 1939 Beaulivre
- 1940 Enrich
- 1941 Battledress
- 1942 Rink
- 1943 Tara King
- 1944 Pensacola
- 1945 Al-Sirat
- 1946 Royal Tan
- 1947 Liebestraum
- 1948 St. Bruno
- 1949 Beaumaris
- 1950 The Unicorn
- 1951 Dalray
- 1952 Programme
- 1953 Idaho
- 1954 Port Boy
- 1955 Syntax
- 1956 Passive
- 1957 William Paul
- 1958 Up and Coming
- 1959 Sol d'Or

== See also ==
- Thoroughbred racing in New Zealand
