= Great Northern Derby (race) =

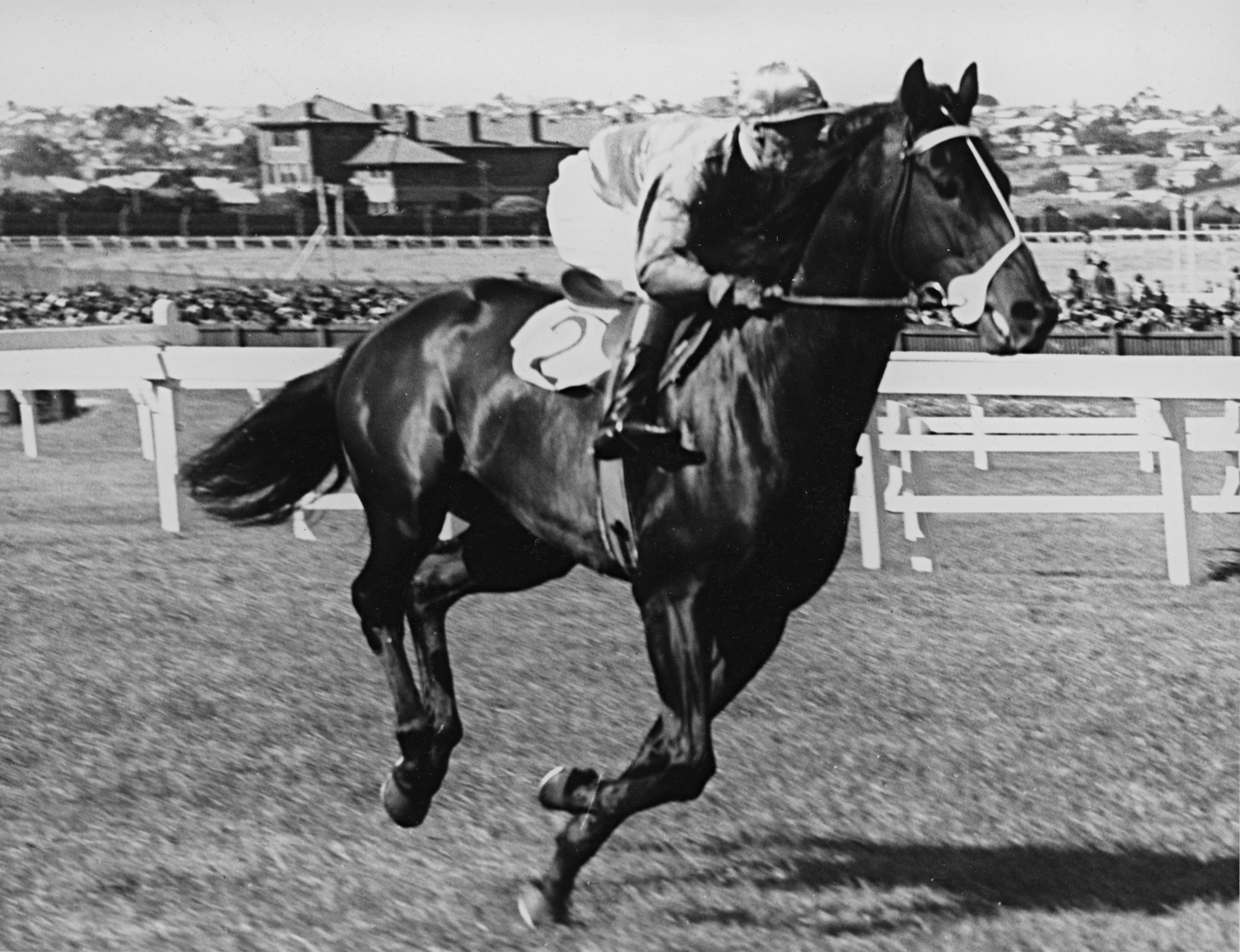
- Beau Vite, 1940 winner.
- Class: Group I
- Location: Ellerslie Racecourse; Auckland, New Zealand
- Inaugurated: 1875
- Race type: Thoroughbred - Flat racing
- Website: www.ellerslie.co.nz

Race information
- Distance: 12 furlongs
- Surface: Turf
- Track: Right-handed
- Qualification: Three-year-olds
- Weight: Set-Weights

The Great Northern Derby was a set-weights thoroughbred horse race for three-year-old horses run over a distance of 2400 m at Ellerslie Racecourse in Auckland, New Zealand. It was discontinued in 1972 after being combined with the New Zealand Derby.

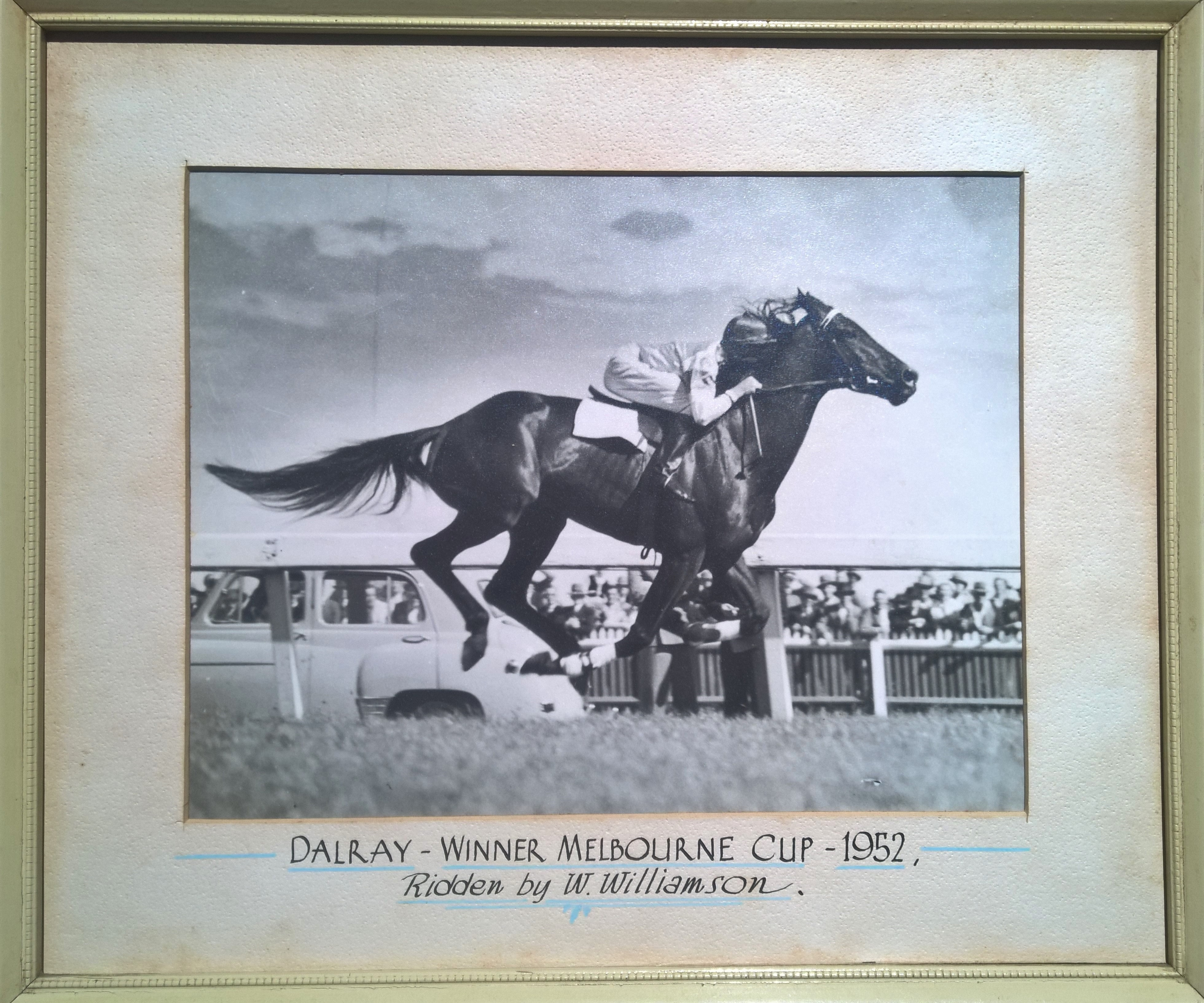
Dalray, 1952 winner.

== History ==
The inaugural running of the Derby was in May 1875, when racing was held at Ellerslie Racecourse for the first time. Just three horses took part, of which one was withdrawn before the start and another failed to complete the course, leaving Toi to finish the race and become the first Derby winner. In 1887 it was renamed the ARC Great Northern Derby Principal race over 12F

The race kept the name, the Great Northern Derby, regularly until 1973 when it was combined with the New Zealand Derby from Riccarton (Christchurch) to form one race, called the New Zealand Derby, which was from then onwards run at Ellerslie. Riccarton was instead given two 1600m races for three-year-olds in place of its Derby, the New Zealand 1000 Guineas and the New Zealand 2000 Guineas.

Only a small number of fillies, including the great Desert Gold, have ever won the Derby against the male horses. Many of New Zealand's most famous racehorses feature on the Derby winners' list, including Kindergarten, Desert Gold, Mainbrace and Gloaming.

== Winners (1960 onwards) ==
The following are the most recent winners of the race.

Year	Horse	Sex	Sire	Dam	Dam Sire
1972	Corroboree	g	Sobig (NZ)	Chat's Own (NZ)	Chatsworth II (GB)
1971	Master John	c	Even Stevens (NZ)	Lover Girl (NZ)	Revelation (GB)
1970	Kirrama	c	Sobig (NZ)	Bann (NZ)	Gabador (FR)
1969	Piko	c	Ayrshire Bard (IRE)	Picco's Pride (NZ)	Pride of Kildare (IRE)
1968	Bardall	c	Ayrshire Bard (IRE)	Jane Filou (NZ)	Le Filou (FR)
1967	Ben Lomond	c	Test Case (GB)	Jennifer Joy (NZ)	Summertime (GB)
1966	Star Belle	f	Summertime (GB)	Belle Rosa (NZ)	Instinct (GB)
1965	Peterman	g	Le Filou (FR)	Lady Macbeth (NZ)	Foxbridge (GB)
1964	Sobig	c	Summertime (GB)	Passive (NZ)	Ruthless (GB)
1963	Ichtar	c	Globe of Light (GB)	Golden Bank (NZ)	Dogger Bank (GB)
1962	Tatua	g	Sajakeda (AUS)	Te Awa (NZ)	Foxbridge (GB)
1961	Cracksman	c	Le Filou (FR)	Triennial (NZ)	Triumvir (GB)
1960	Stipulate	c	Count Rendered (GB)	Faline (NZ)	Brer Fox (NZ)

== Earlier winners ==
- 1959 - Gitano
- 1958 - Lawful
- 1957 - Passive/Gibraltar
- 1956 - Syntax
- 1955 - Somerset Fair
- 1954 - Fox Myth
- 1953 - Programme
- 1952 - Dalray
- 1951 - Mainbrace
- 1950 - Sweet Spray
- 1949 - Tauloch
- 1948 - Sweet Nymph
- 1947 - Beau Le Havre
- 1946 - Lady Foxbridge
- 1945 - Coronaire
- 1944 - Expanse
- 1943 - Indian Princess
- 1942 - Regal Fox
- 1941 - Kindergarten
- 1940 - Beau Vite
- 1939 - Defaulter
- 1938 - Courtcraft
- 1937 - Essex
- 1936 - Greek Shepherd
- 1935 - Gay Blonde
- 1934 - Red Manfred
- 1933 - Silver Scorn
- 1932 - Bronze Eagle
- 1931 - Karapoti
- 1930 - Hunting Cry
- 1929 - Red Heckle
- 1928 - Martarma
- 1927 - Commendation
- 1926 - Star Stranger
- 1925 - Count Cavour
- 1924 - Ballymena
- 1923 - Enthusiasm
- 1922 - Winning Hit
- 1921 - Gasbag
- 1920 - Royal Stag
- 1919 - Gloaming
- 1918 - Estland
- 1917 - Sasanof
- 1916 - Desert Gold
- 1915 - Reputation
- 1914 - Cherubini
- 1913 - Bon Reve
- 1912 - Counterfeit
- 1911 - Danube
- 1910 - Kilwinning
- 1909 - Husbandman
- 1908 - Boniform
- 1907 - Zimmerman
- 1906 - Multifid
- 1905 - Gladstone
- 1904 - Gladsome
- 1903 - Wairiki
- 1902 - Menschikoff
- 1901 - Renown
- 1900 - Miss Delaval
- 1899 - Blue Jacket
- 1898 - St. Crispin
- 1897 - Nestor
- 1896 - Fabulist
- 1895 - Stepfeldt
- 1894 - Loyalty
- 1893 - St. Hippo
- 1892 - Morion
- 1891 - Medallion
- 1890 - Tirailleur
- 1889 - Cuirassier
- 1888 - Sextant
- 1887 - Disowned
- 1886 - Foul Shot
- 1885 - Tigridia
- 1884 - Nelson
- 1883 - Welcome Jack
- 1882 - Fitz Hercules
- 1881 - Tim Whiffler
- 1880 - Libeller
- 1879 - Omega
- 1878 - Venus Transit
- 1877 - Danebury
- 1876 - Ariel
- 1875 - Toi

== See also ==
- New Zealand Derby
- New Zealand Derby (Riccarton)
- Thoroughbred racing in New Zealand
