= Chelmsford Stakes =

Horse race in Sydney, Australia

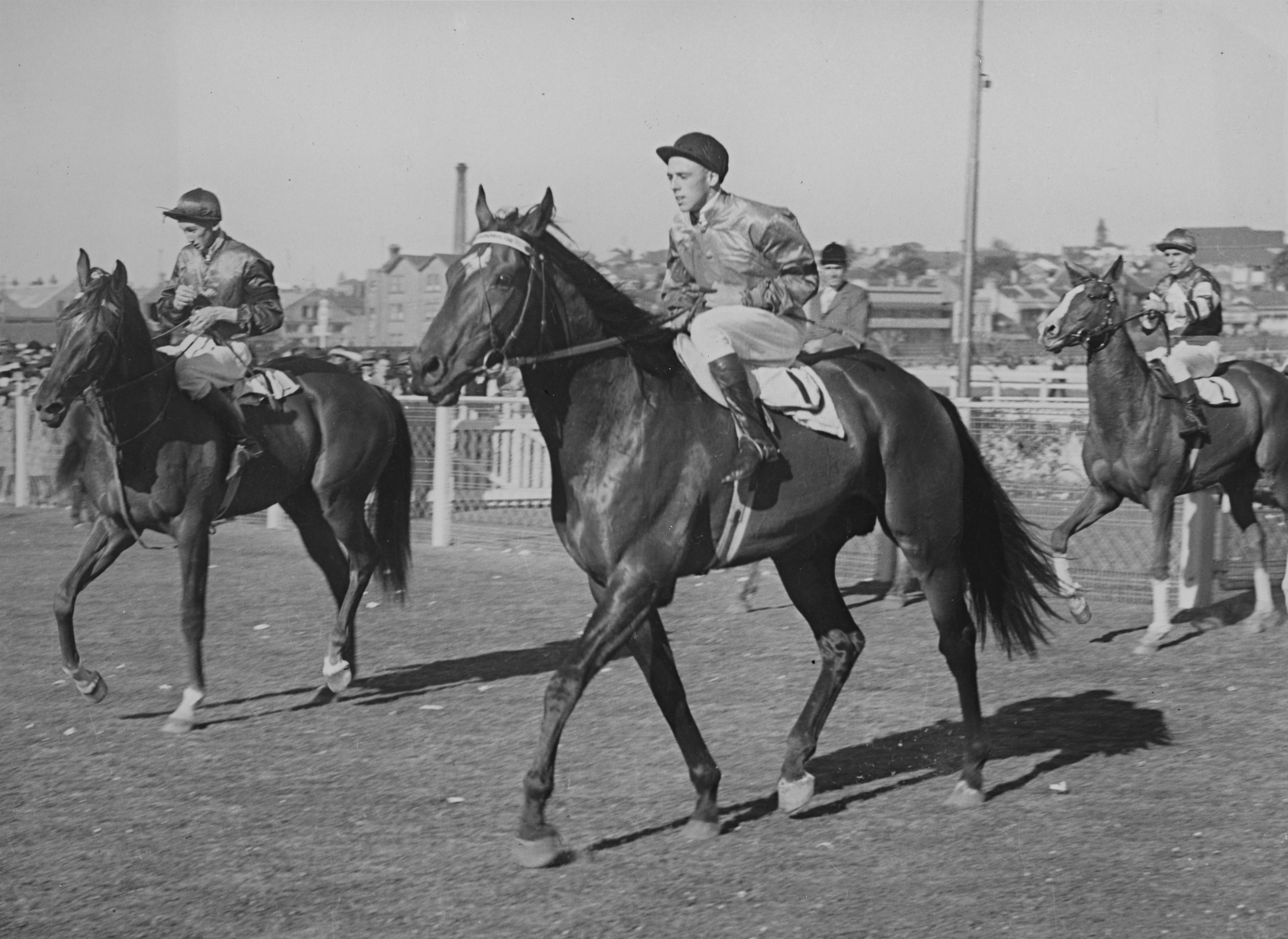
- Bernborough, 1946 winner
- Class: Group 2
- Location: Randwick Racecourse, Sydney, Australia
- Inaugurated: 1895
- Race type: Thoroughbred - flat
- Sponsor: Asahi Breweries; Asahi Super Dry (2025 & 2026)

Race information
- Distance: 1,600 metres
- Surface: Turf
- Track: Right-handed
- Weight: Weight for Age
- Purse: A$300,000 (2026)

The Chelmsford Stakes is a Tattersalls Club Group 2 Thoroughbred horse race run over 1600 metres at Weight for Age at Randwick Racecourse, Sydney, Australia, in September.

== History ==
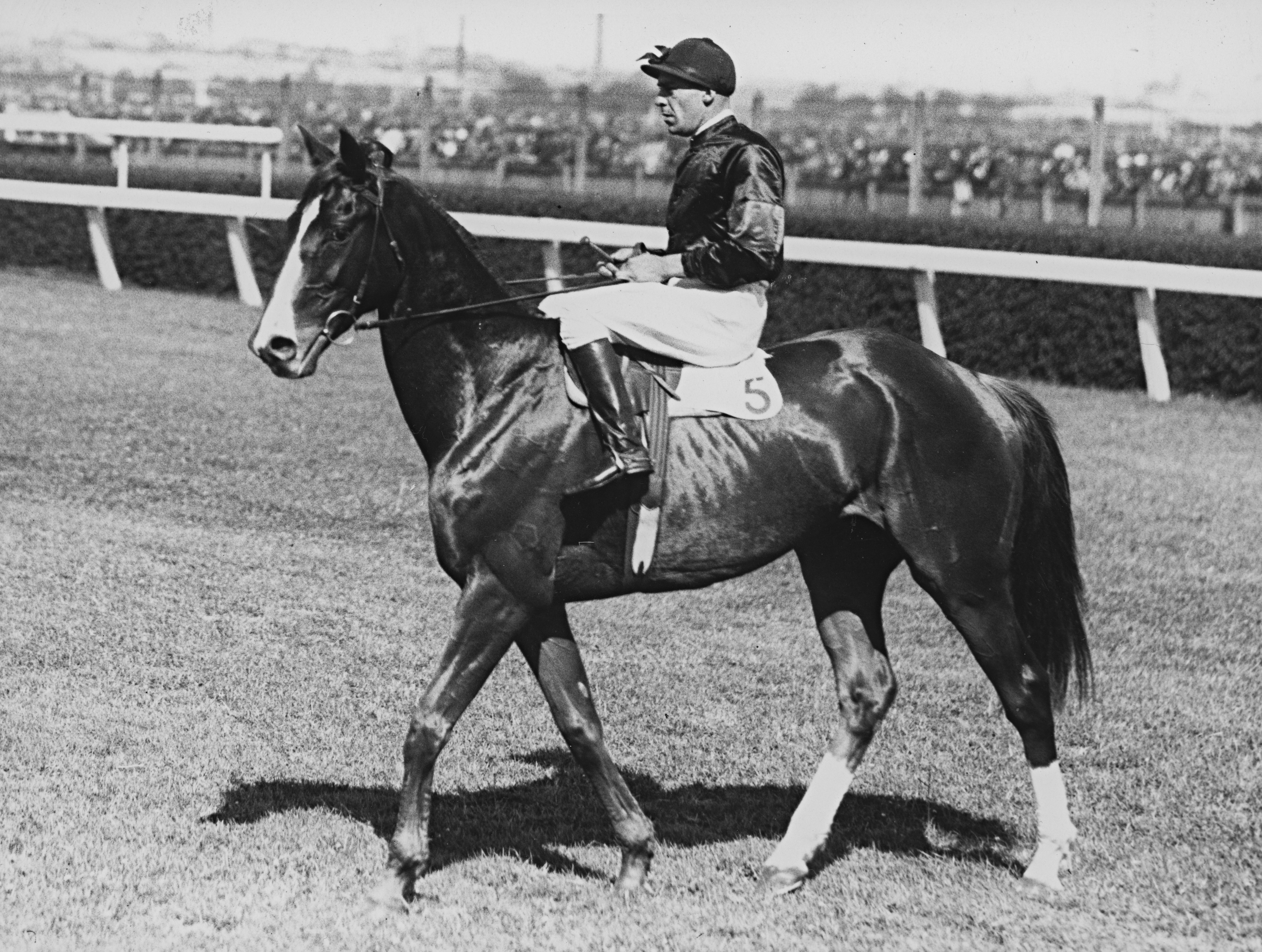
Rogilla, 1933 and 1934 winner

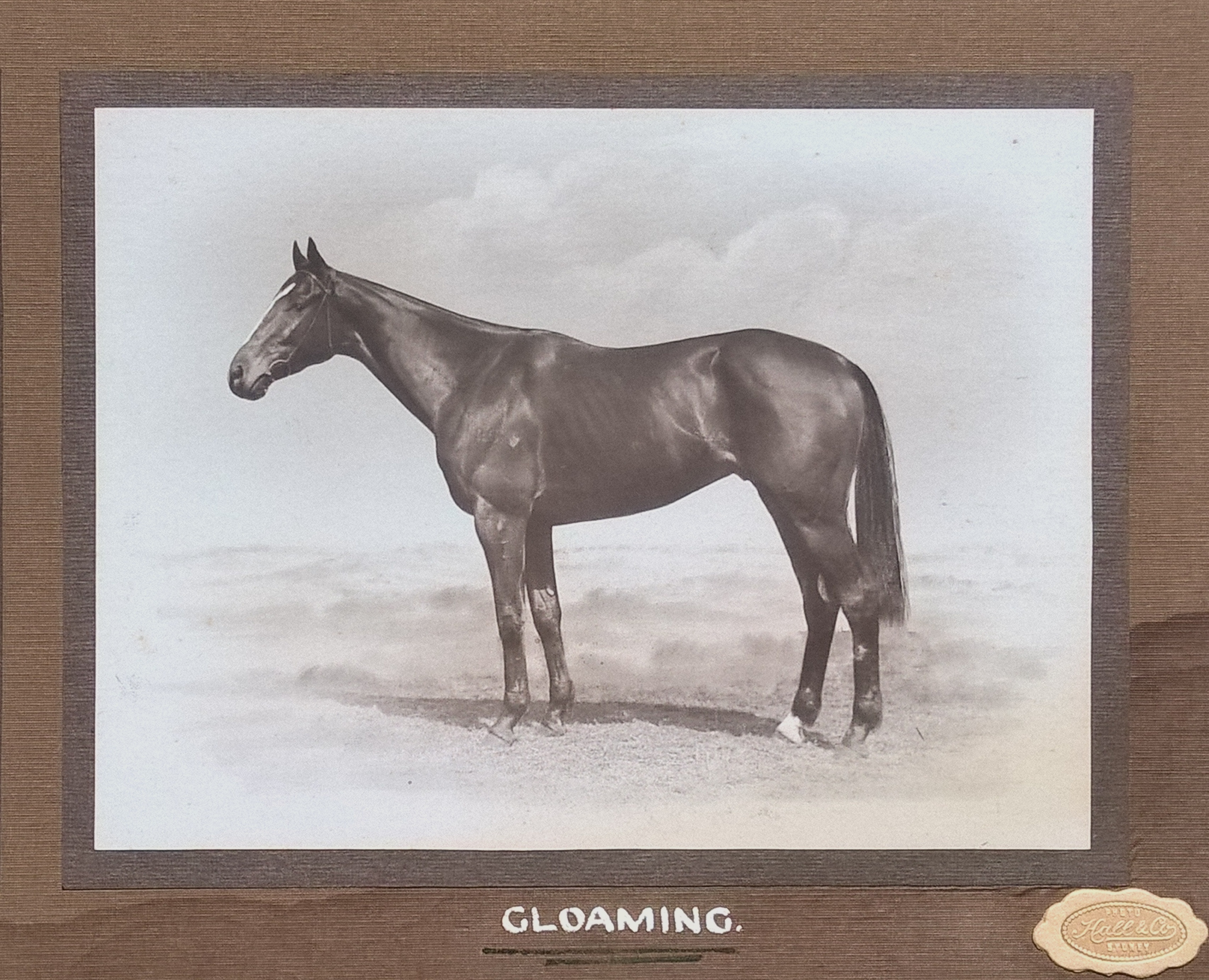
Gloaming, 1918 winner

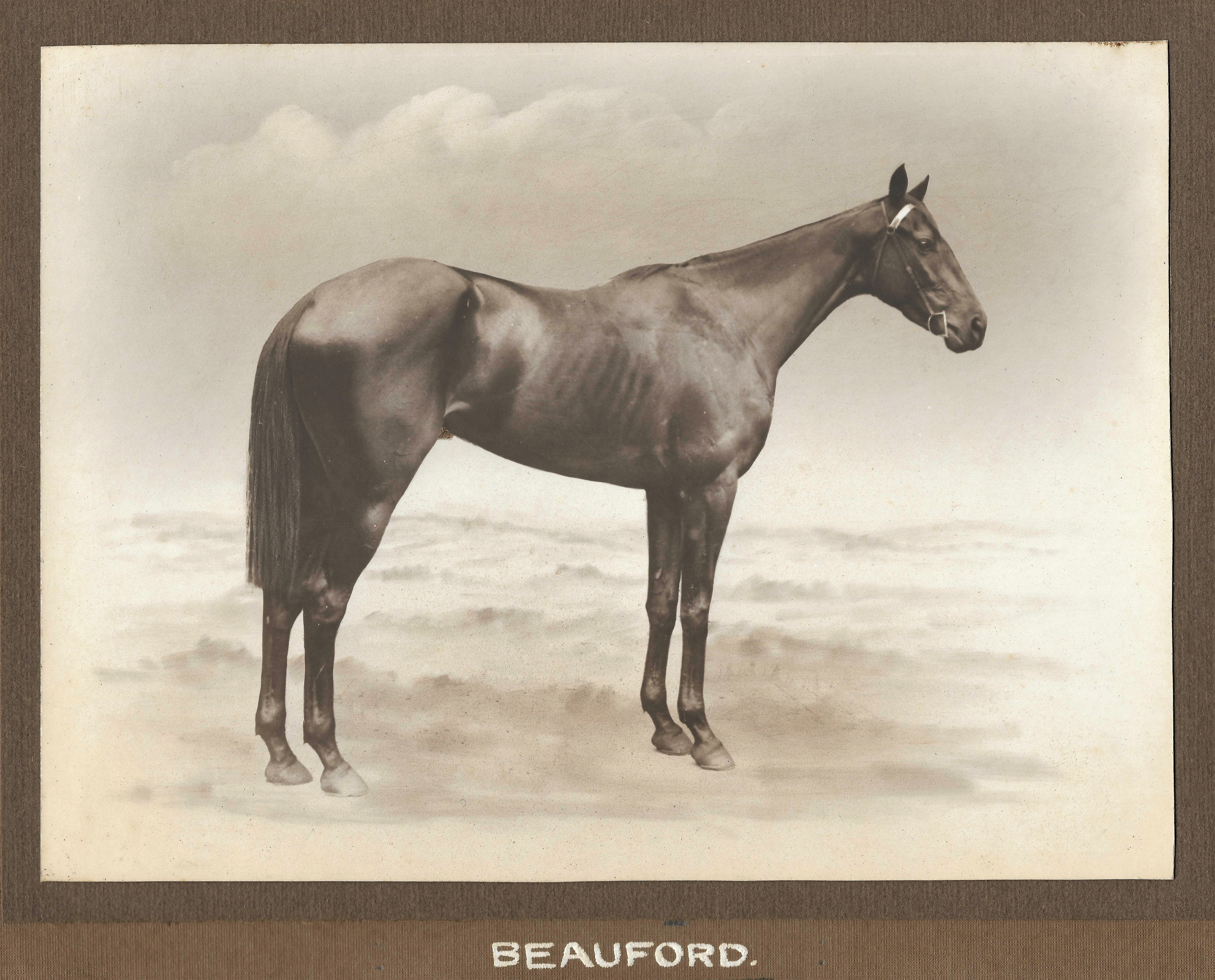
Beauford, 1922 winner

The race was first run in 1895.

=== Grade ===
- 1895–1979 - Principal Race
- 1980 onwards - Group 2

=== Venue ===
- 1983 - Warwick Farm
- 1984–1999 - Randwick
- 2000 - Rosehill
- 2001–2003 - Randwick
- 2004 - Warwick Farm
- 2005–2010 - Randwick
- 2011–2012 - Warwick Farm
- 2013 onwards - Randwick

=== Distance ===
- 1895–1971 - 9 furlongs (~1800 metres)
- 1972–1982 – 1800 metres
- 1983 – 1600 metres
- 1984 – 1800 metres
- 1985–1999 – 1600 metres
- 2000 – 1500 metres
- 2001 – 1400 metres
- 2002–2005 – 1600 metres
- 2006 – 1550 metres
- 2008 onwards - 1600 metres

=== 1926 and 1945 racebooks ===
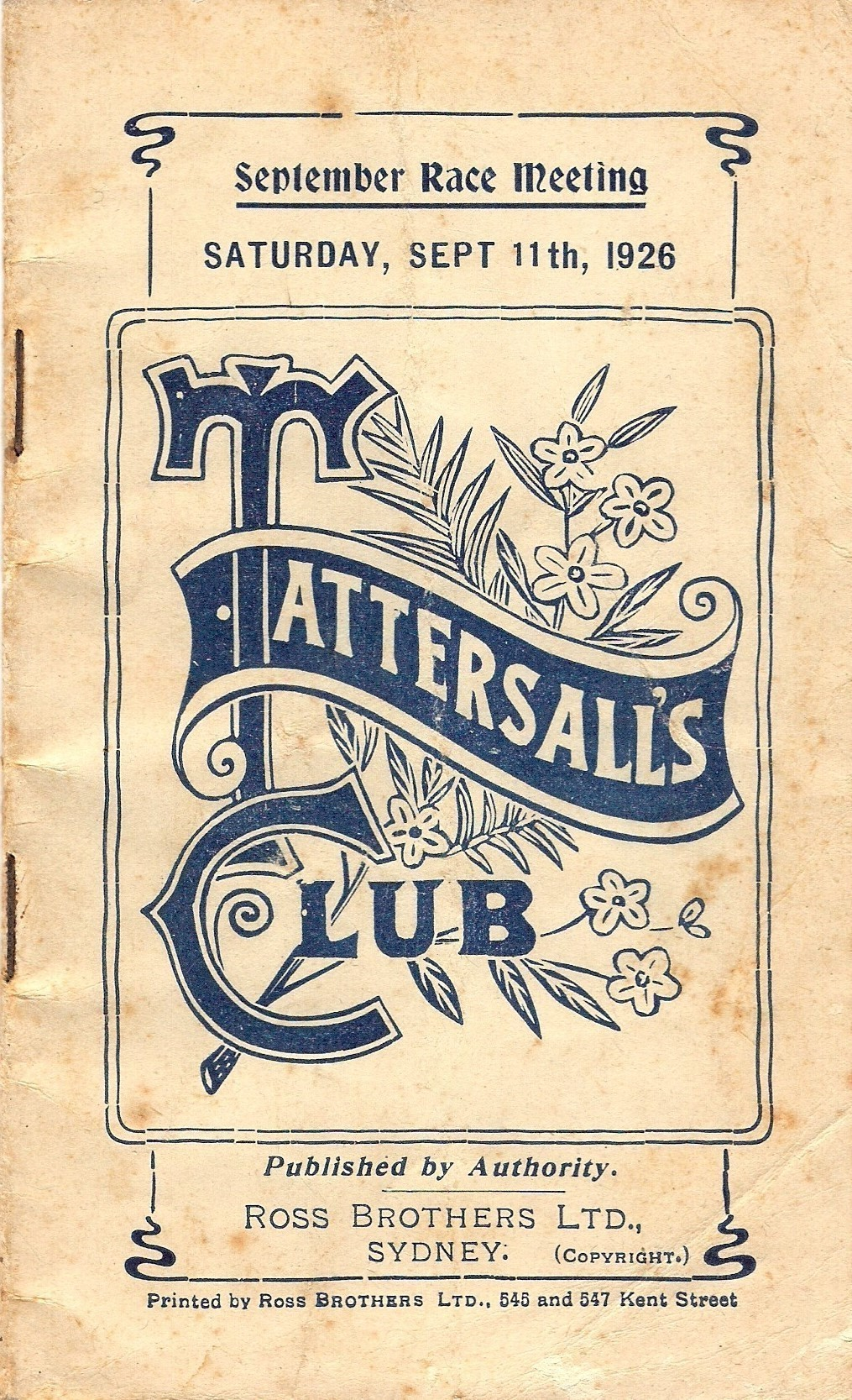
1926 Tatts Chelmsford Stakes racebook front cover

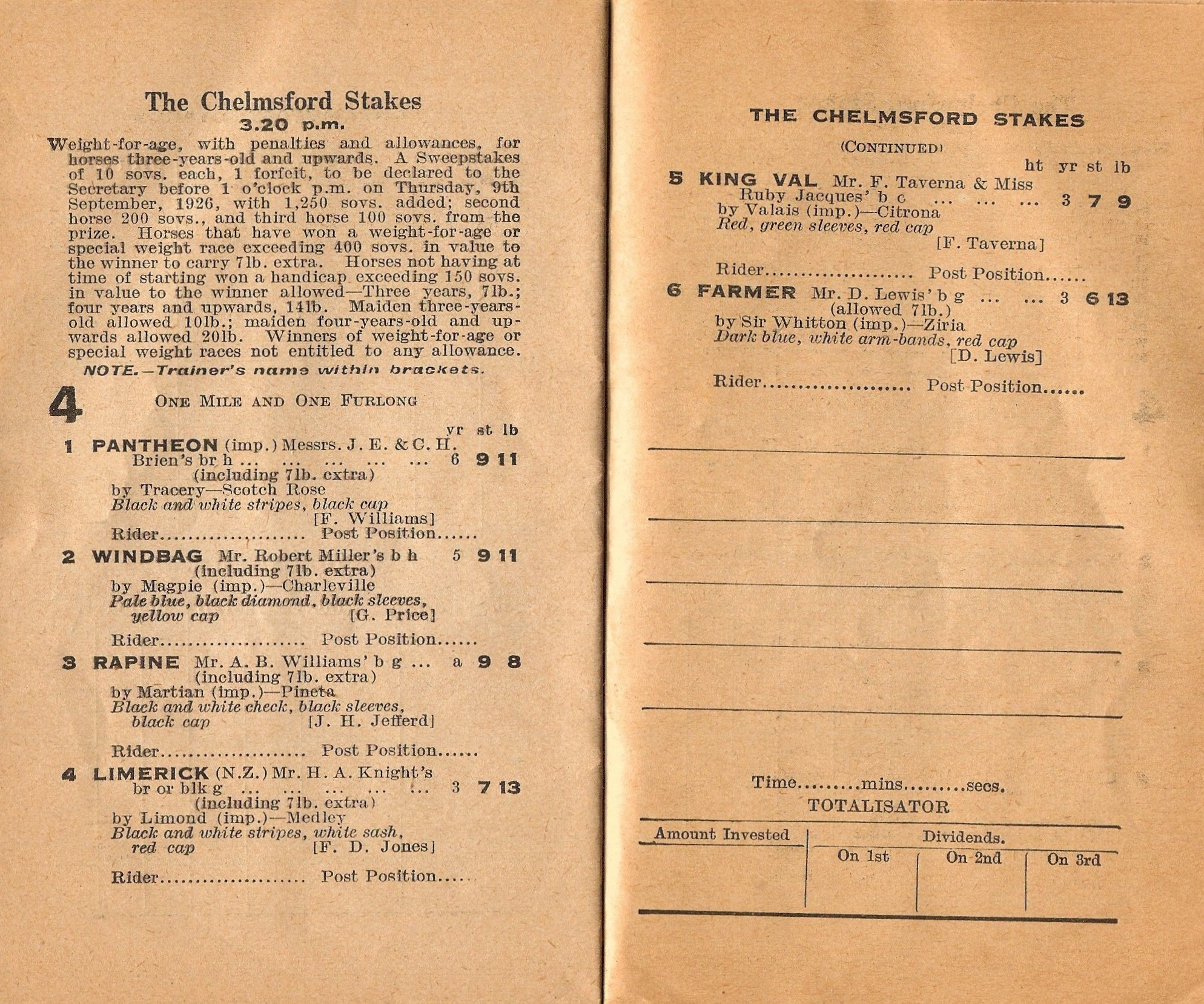
1926 Tatts Chelmsford Stakes showing the winner, Limerick

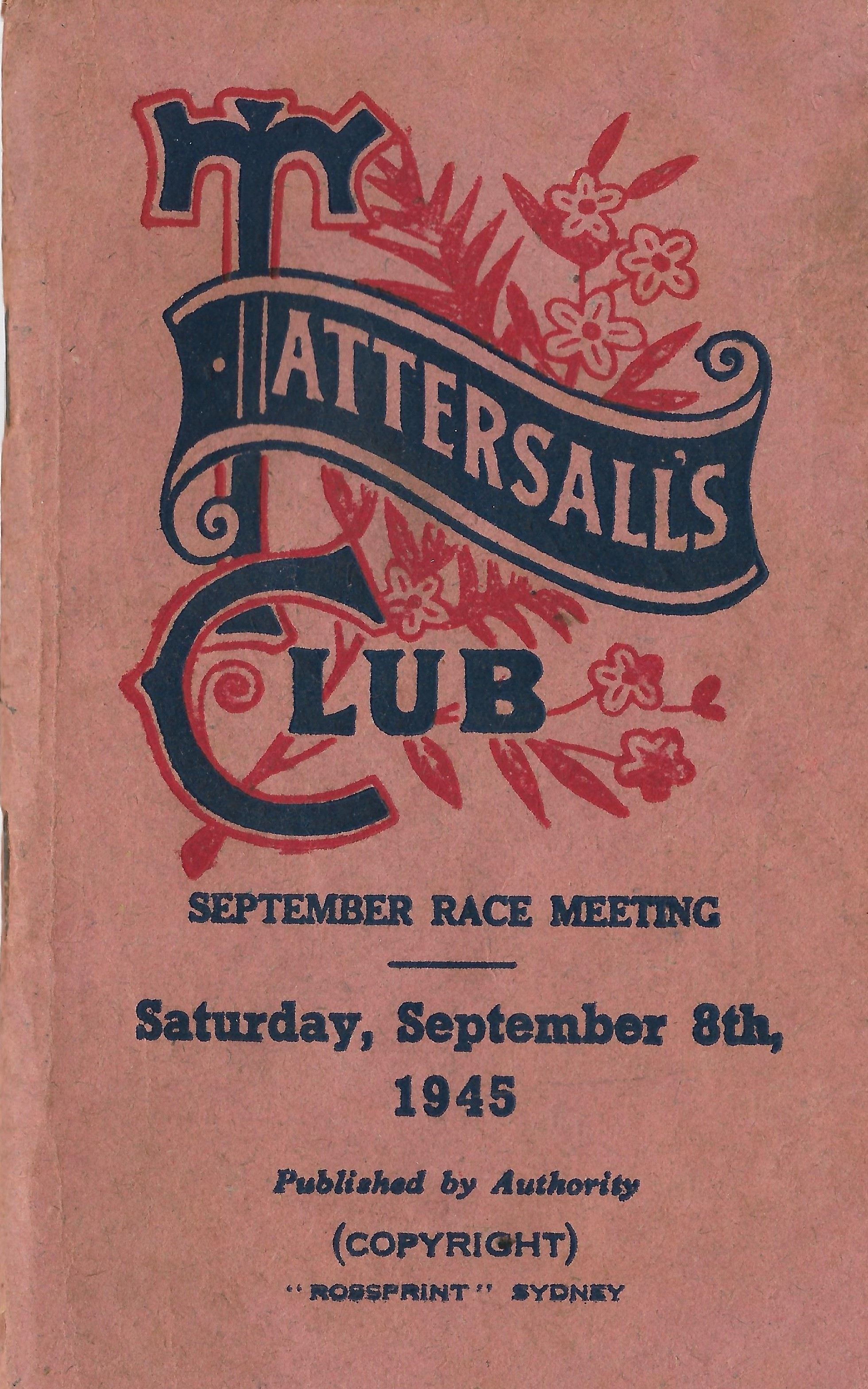
1945 Tatts Chelmsford Stakes racebook front cover

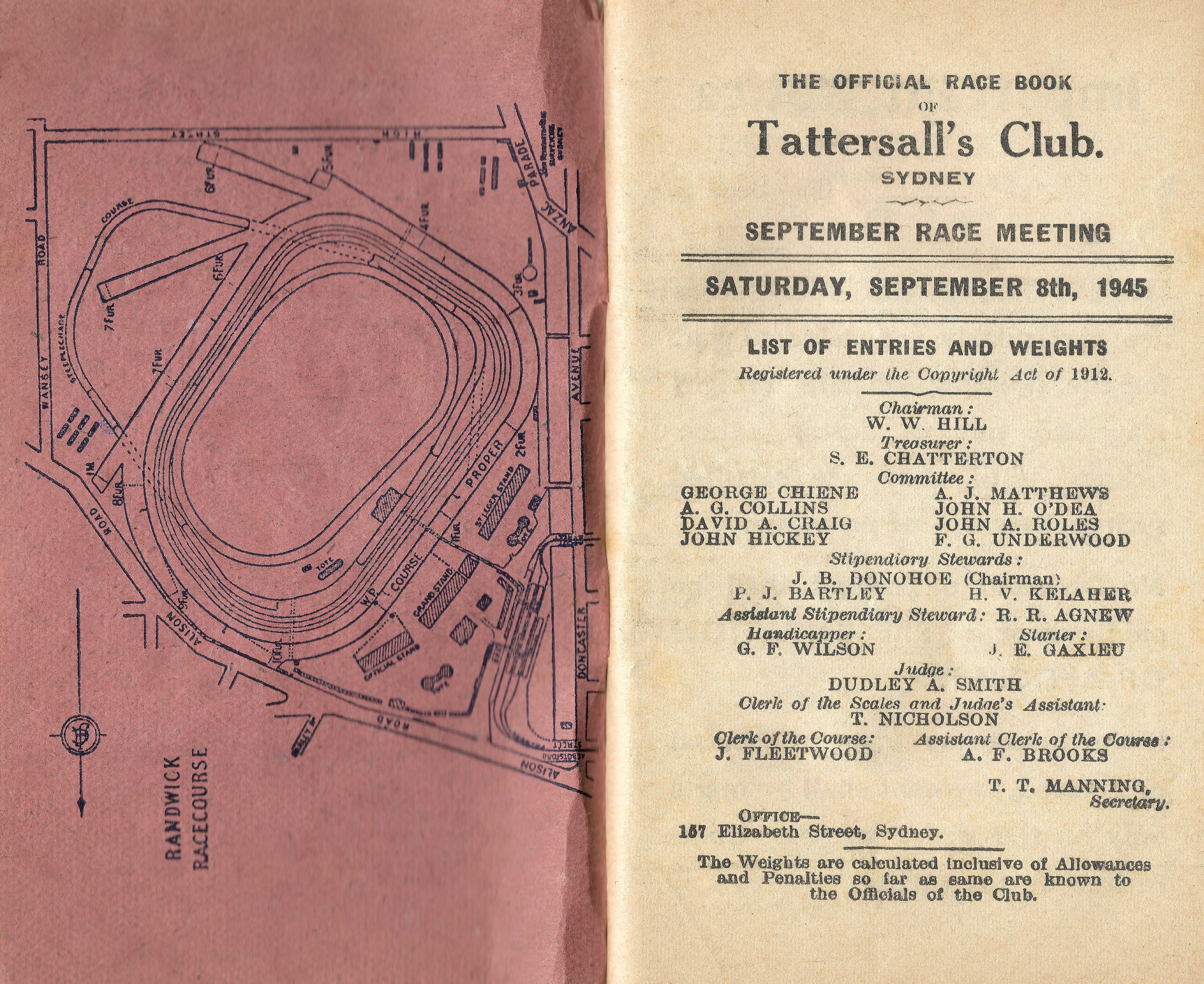
1945 Tatts Chelmsford Stakes raceday officials

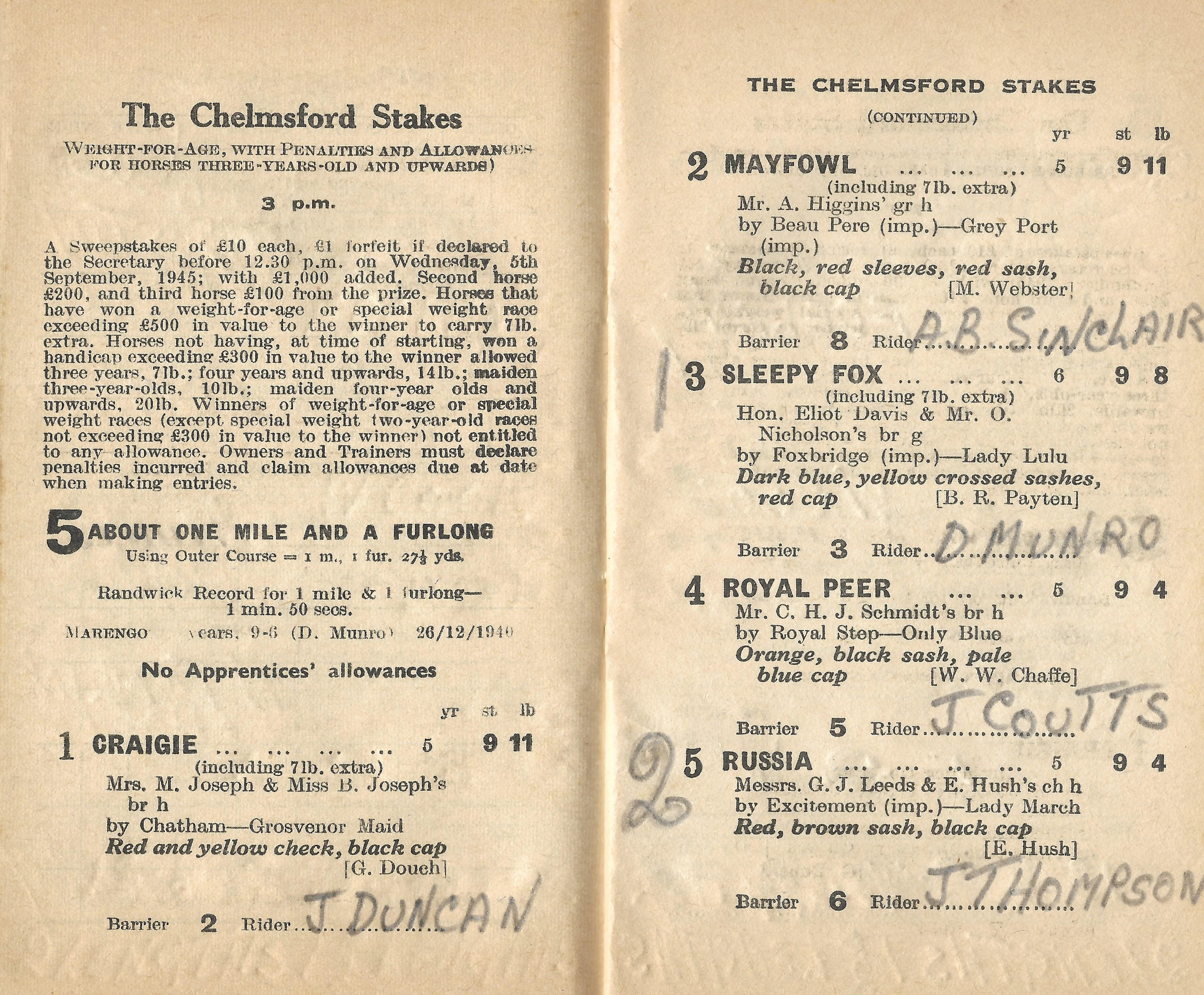
1945 Tatts Chelmsford Stakes showing the winner, Sleepy Fox

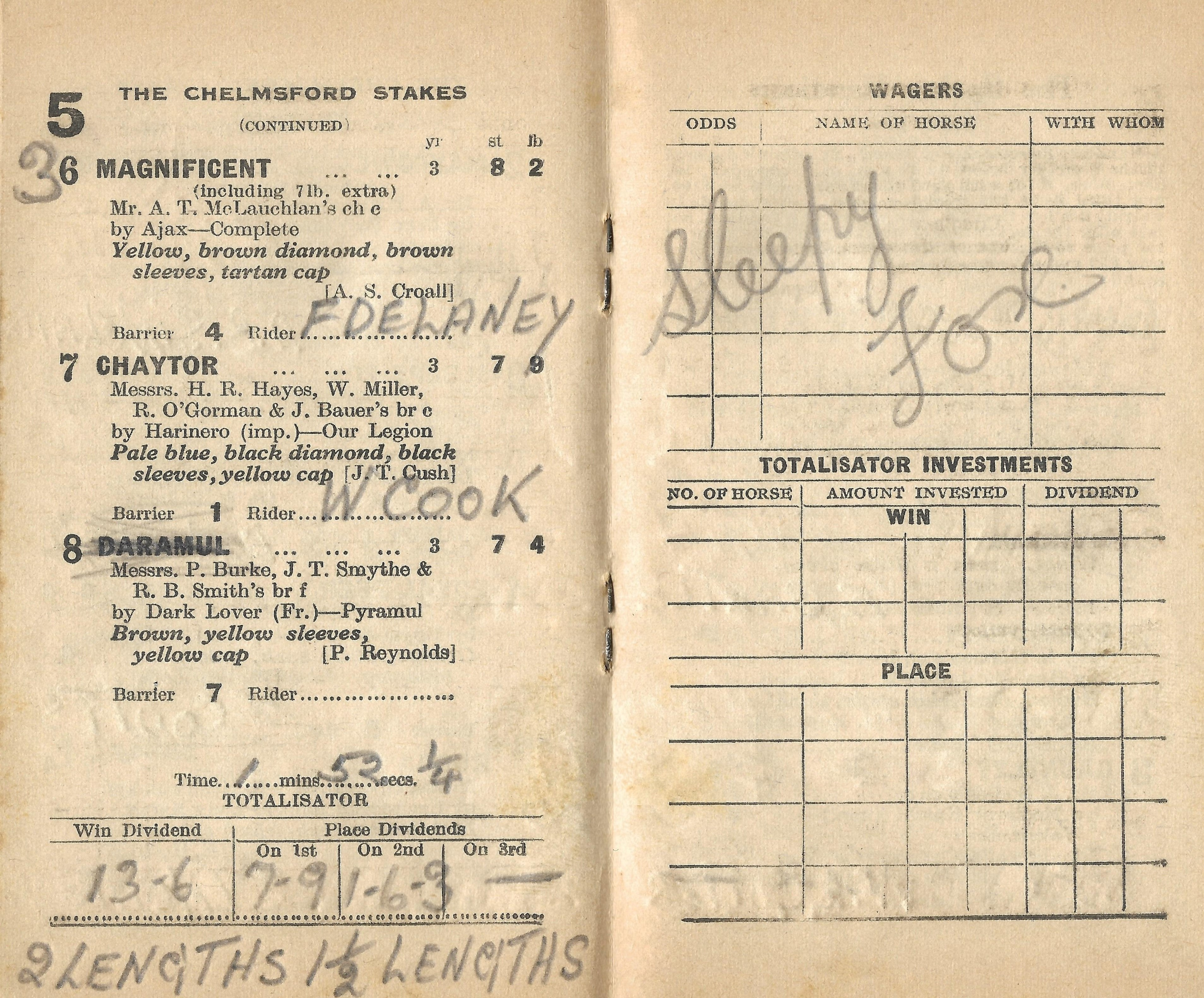
1945 Tatts Chelmsford Stakes starters and results

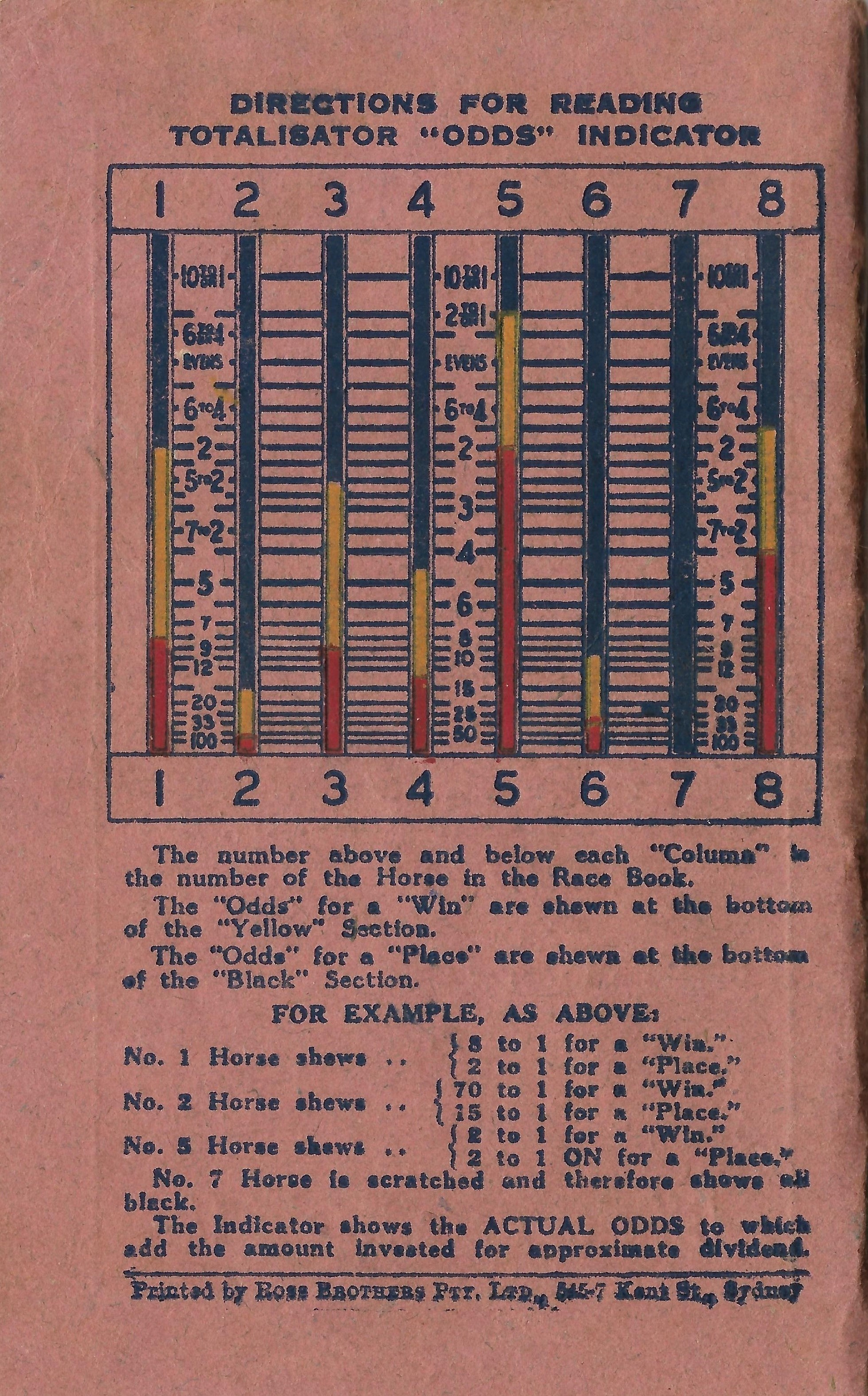
Back cover showing totalisator odds indicator

=== Gallery of noted winners ===
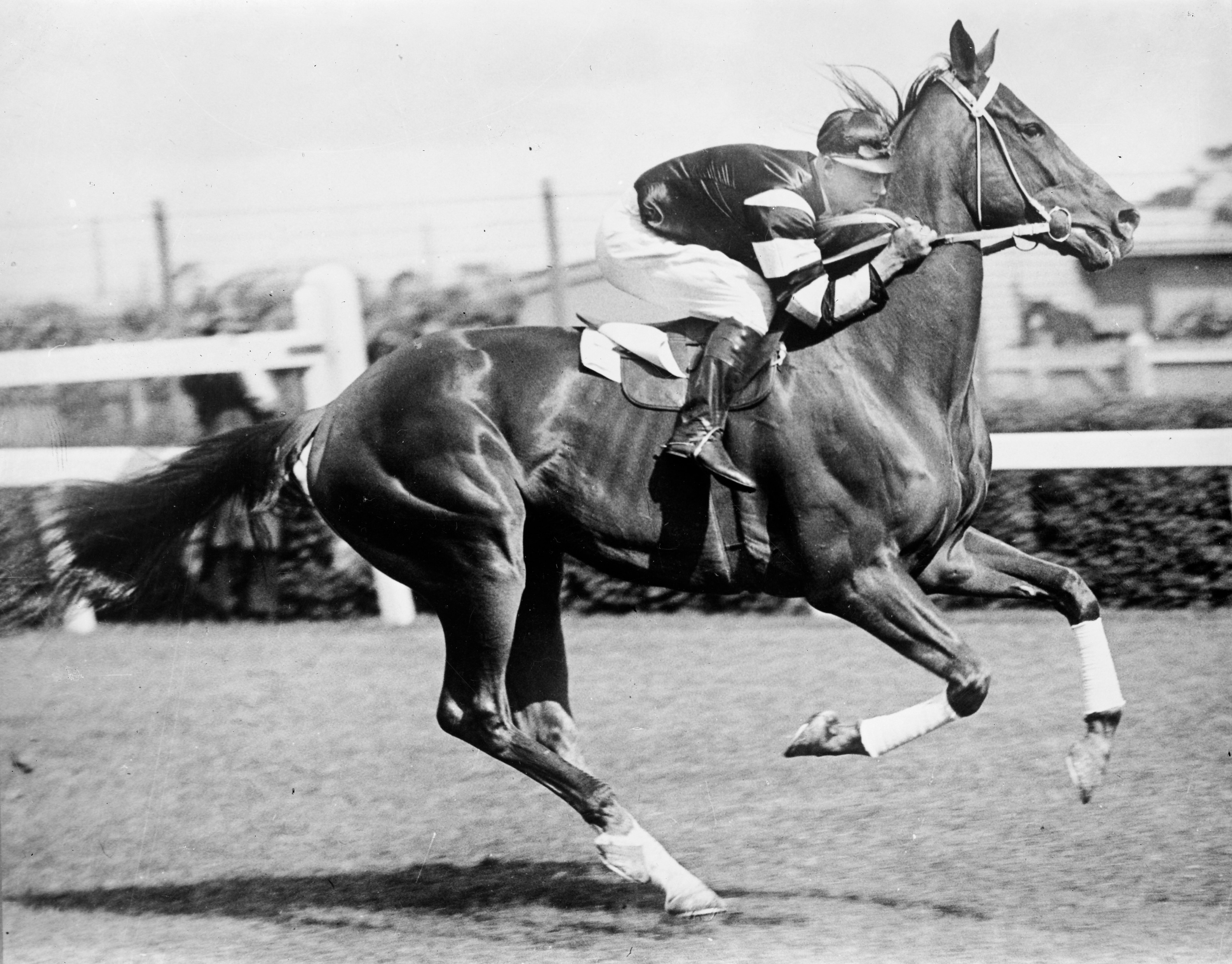
Phar Lap, 1930 winner

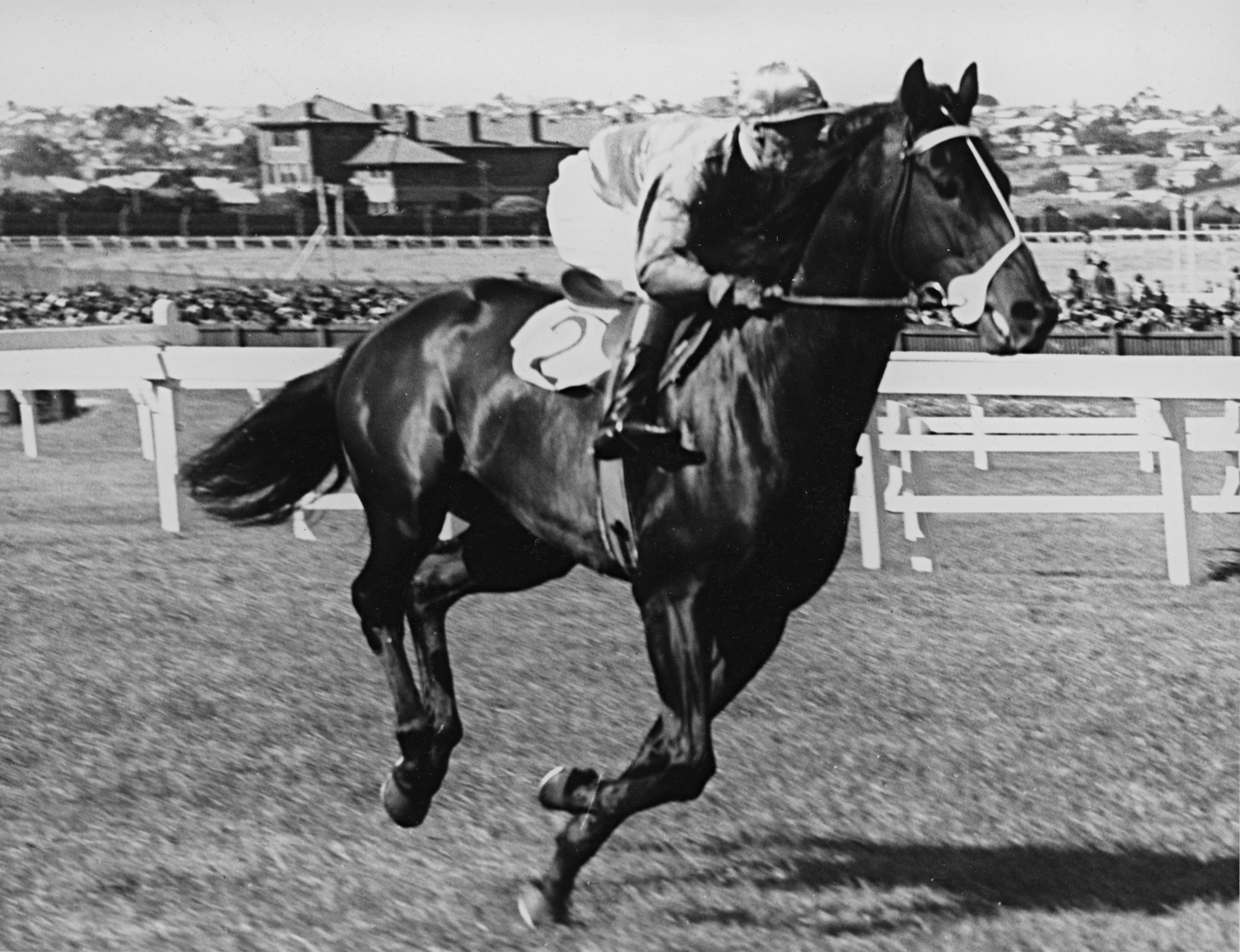
Beau Vite, 1941 winner

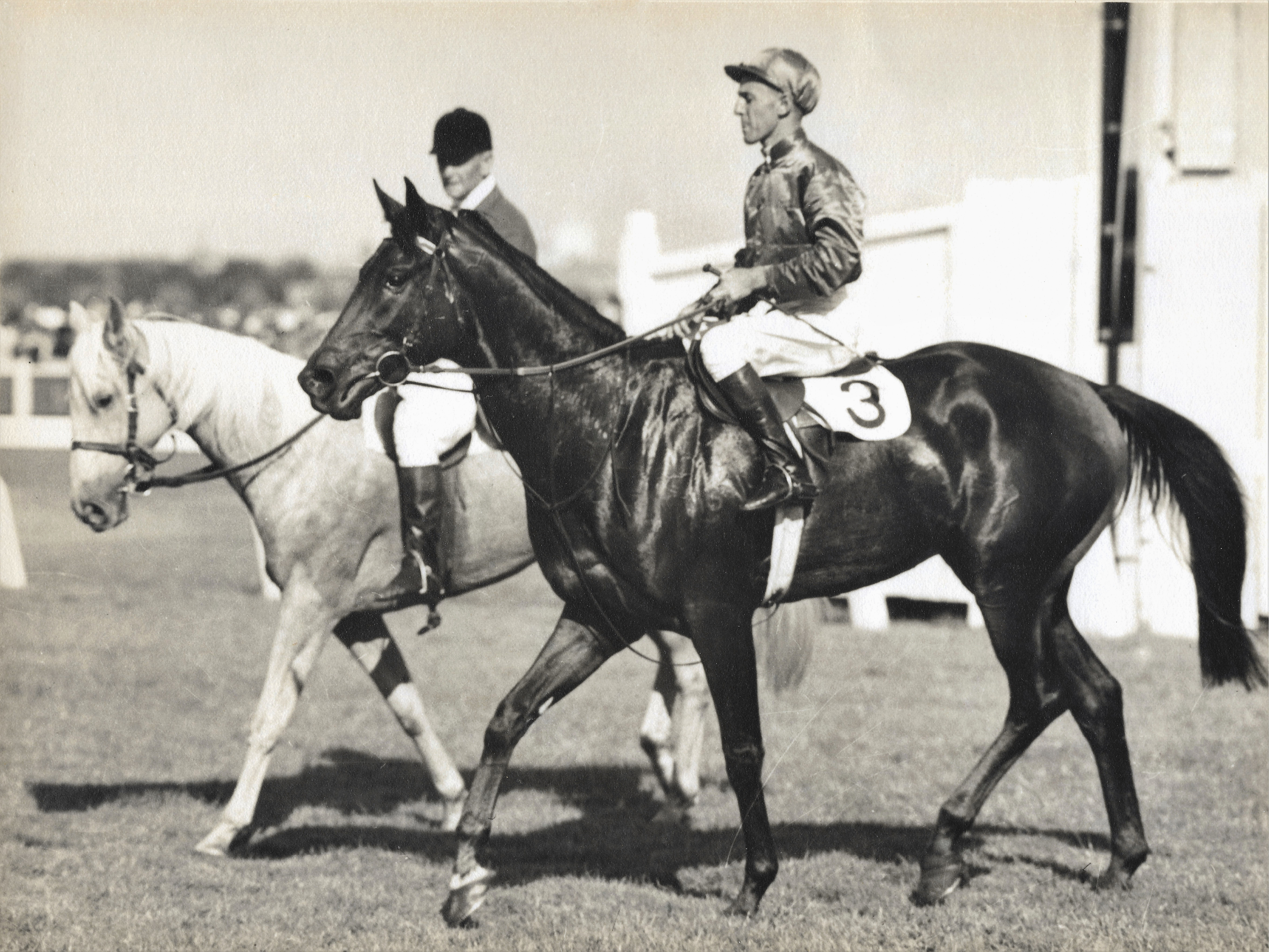
Delta, 1950, 1951 and 1952 winner

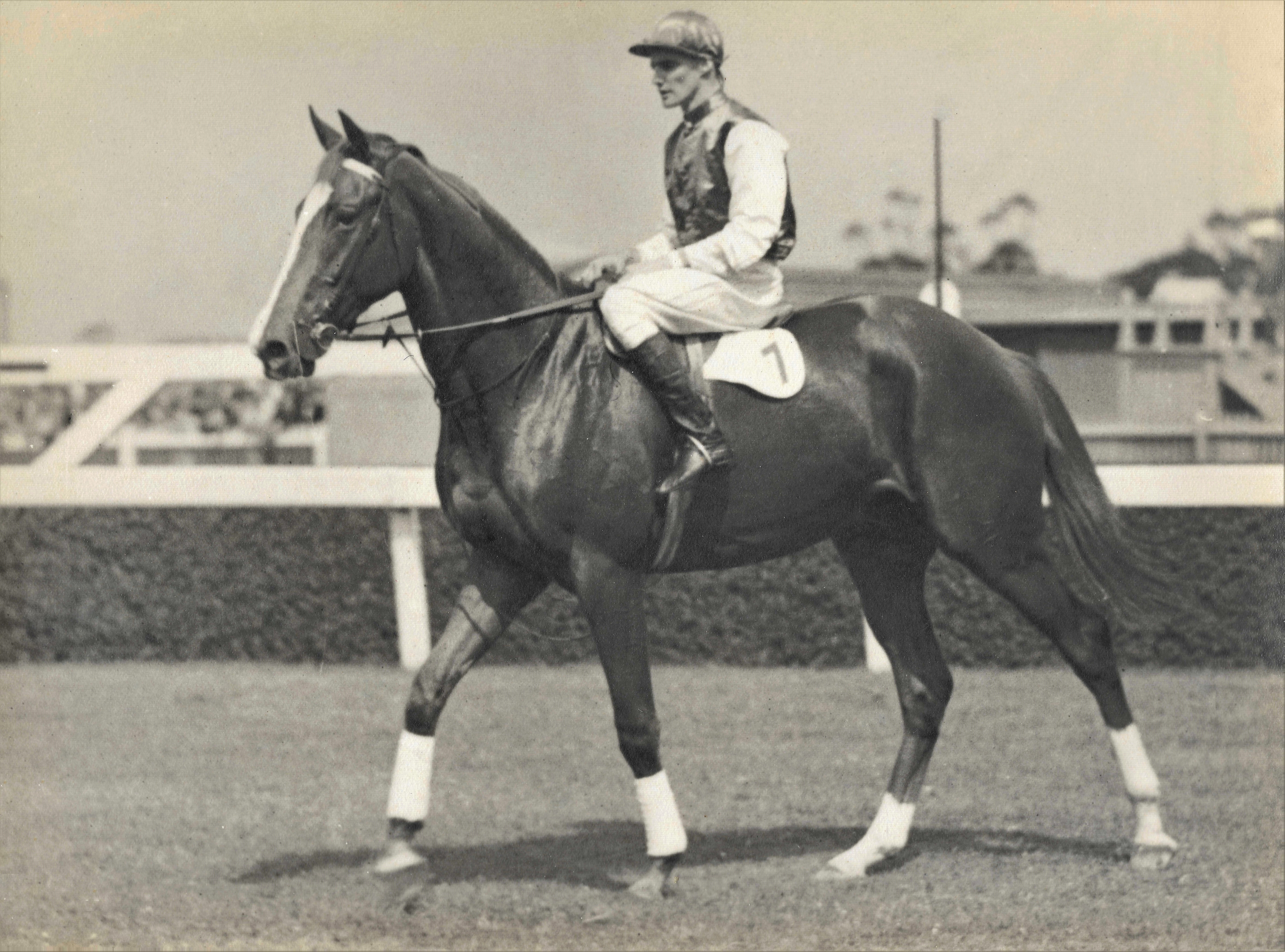
Gold Rod, 1936 winner

== Winners ==
The following are past winners of the race.

- 2026 - Lindermann
- 2025 - Lindermann
- 2024 - Buckaroo
- 2023 - Navajo Peak
- 2022 - Knights Order
- 2021 - Think It Over
- 2020 - Mister Sea Wolf
- 2019 - Samadoubt
- 2018 - Unforgotten
- 2017 - Winx
- 2016 - Hartnell
- 2015 - Complacent
- 2014 - Hawkspur
- 2013 - Hawkspur
- 2012 - Danleigh
- 2011 - Trusting
- 2010 - Theseo
- 2009 - O'Lonhro
- 2008 - Gallant Tess
- 2007 - †race not held
- 2006 - Eremein
- 2005 - Nevis
- 2004 - Unearthly
- 2003 - Lonhro
- 2002 - Lonhro
- 2001 - Brave Prince
- 2000 - Pasta Express
- 1999 - Intergaze
- 1998 - Might and Power
- 1997 - Juggler
- 1996 - Filante
- 1995 - Oppressor
- 1994 - March Hare
- 1993 - Soho Square
- 1992 - Dr. Grace
- 1991 - Stargazer
- 1990 - Stargazer
- 1989 - High Regard
- 1988 - Sky Chase
- 1987 - Campaign King
- 1986 - Shankhill Lass
- 1985 - Lord Of Camelot
- 1984 - Hayai
- 1983 - Emancipation
- 1982 - Rare Form
- 1981 - Kingston Town
- 1980 - Kingston Town
- 1979 - Mighty Kingdom
- 1978 - Ming Dynasty
- 1977 - Flirting Prince
- 1976 - Purple Patch
- 1975 - Leica Lover
- 1974 - Passetreul
- 1973 - Longfella
- 1972 - Turbino
- 1971 - Tails
- 1970 - Gunsynd
- 1969 - Roman Consul
- 1968 - Roman Consul
- 1967 - Roman Consul
- 1966 - Trevors
- 1965 - Pyramus
- 1964 - Summer Fair
- 1963 - Maidenhead
- 1962 - Burgos
- 1961 - Sharply
- 1960 - Tulloch
- 1959 - Pique
- 1958 - Prince Darius
- 1957 - Prince Darius
- 1956 - Advocate
- 1955 - Electro
- 1954 - Prince Cortauld
- 1953 - Royal Stream
- 1952 - Delta
- 1951 - Delta
- 1950 - Delta
- 1949 - Columnist
- 1948 - Bernbrook
- 1947 - Proctor
- 1946 - Bernborough
- 1945 - Sleepy Fox
- 1944 - Veiled Threat
- 1943 - Tribal
- 1942 - Rimveil
- 1941 - Beau Vite
- 1940 - Beaulivre
- 1939 - Defaulter
- 1938 - Royal Chief
- 1937 - Mala
- 1936 - Gold Rod
- 1935 - Sylvandale
- 1934 - Rogilla
- 1933 - Rogilla
- 1932 - Gaine Carrington
- 1931 - Ammon Ra
- 1930 - Phar Lap
- 1929 - Mollison
- 1928 - Limerick
- 1927 - Limerick
- 1926 - Limerick
- 1925 - Windbag
- 1924 - Heroic
- 1923 - Rapine
- 1922 - Beauford
- 1921 - Syce Knight
- 1920 - Chrysolaus
- 1919 - Richmond Main
- 1918 - Gloaming
- 1917 - Prince Viridis
- 1916 - Sasanof
- 1915 - Garlin
- 1914 - Woorak
- 1913 - Duke Foote
- 1912 - Duke Foote
- 1911 - Los Angelos
- 1910 - Prince Foote
- 1909 - Prince Foote
- 1908 - Perkeo
- 1907 - Mountain King
- 1906 - Solution
- 1905 - Marvel Loch
- 1904 - Warroo
- 1903 - Duke Of Grafton
- 1902 - Abundance
- 1901 - Sir Leonard
- 1900 - Dandy
- 1899 - The Chief
- 1898 - The Chief
- 1897 - Amberite
- 1896 - Hopscotch
- 1895 - Newman

† Not held because of outbreak of equine influenza

== See also ==
- Concorde Stakes (Australia)
- Furious Stakes
- Tramway Stakes
- List of Australian Group races
- Group races
