= Bill Williamson =

Australian jockey

Personal information
- Full name: William James Williamson
- Born: 19 December 1922 Williamstown, Melbourne
- Died: 28 January 1979 (aged 56)
- Occupation: Jockey

Horse racing career
- Sport: Horse racing

Major racing wins
- VRC Sires (1944, 1949, 1950, 1951, 1952); Caulfield Stakes (1944, 1954); Newmarket Handicap (1945); Oakleigh Plate (1947, 1953); Futurity Stakes (1949, 1952, 1953, 1956); Adelaide Cup (1949); Doomben 10,000 (1949); Caulfield Guineas (1949, 1959); AJC Sires Produce Stakes (1950, 1952); Champagne Stakes (1950); Epsom Handicap (1950, 1951, 1954); VRC 1000 Guineas (1950, 1956, 1957); VRC Oaks (1950, 1956, 1957); Invitation Stakes (1952); Mackinnon Stakes (1952, 1955); Melbourne Cup (1952); W S Cox Plate (1953); Brisbane Cup (1953); Doomben Cup (1954); Australian Cup (1954); Caulfield Cup (1955, 1960); Underwood Stakes (1957); Toorak Handicap (1957); VRC Derby (1958); International race wins: Irish Oaks (1960, 1963, 1966); Irish St Leger (1960, 1964); Yorkshire Oaks (1960); Sussex Stakes (1961); Timeform Gold Cup (1961, 1964, 1967); Irish 2000 Guineas (1962); 1000 Guineas (1962, 1965); Champion Stakes (1962); Grosser Preis von Baden (1963, 1964); Prix de l'Arc de Triomphe (1968, 1969); Irish 1000 Guineas (1969); Ascot Gold Cup (1969); Prix Du Cadran (1969); Poule d'Essai des Poulains (1970); Prix De Diane (1970); Prix d'Ispahan (1970); Grand Prix de Saint-Cloud (1970); Poule d'Essai des Pouliches (1971); Irish Derby (1972)

Racing awards
- Victorian jockeys premiership 1951/52 1952/53 1953/54 1955/56 1956/57 1957/58
- Updated on 10 April 2011

William James Williamson (19 December 1922 – 28 January 1979) was an Australian jockey who enjoyed considerable success in Australia during the 1950s and in Europe during the 1960s. He was named after his father William James Williamson, a machinist, and his wife Euphemia Agnes.

== Racing career ==
From a young age he showed considerable interest in horse racing and left Mordialloc-Chelsea High School aged 14 to take up a post as an apprentice jockey. He worked initially under trainer F. H. Lewis who was his great uncle who was the brother of Robert Lewis also a jockey. During this time he met Jack Holt the trainer. He won his first race in 1937 at Lilirene.

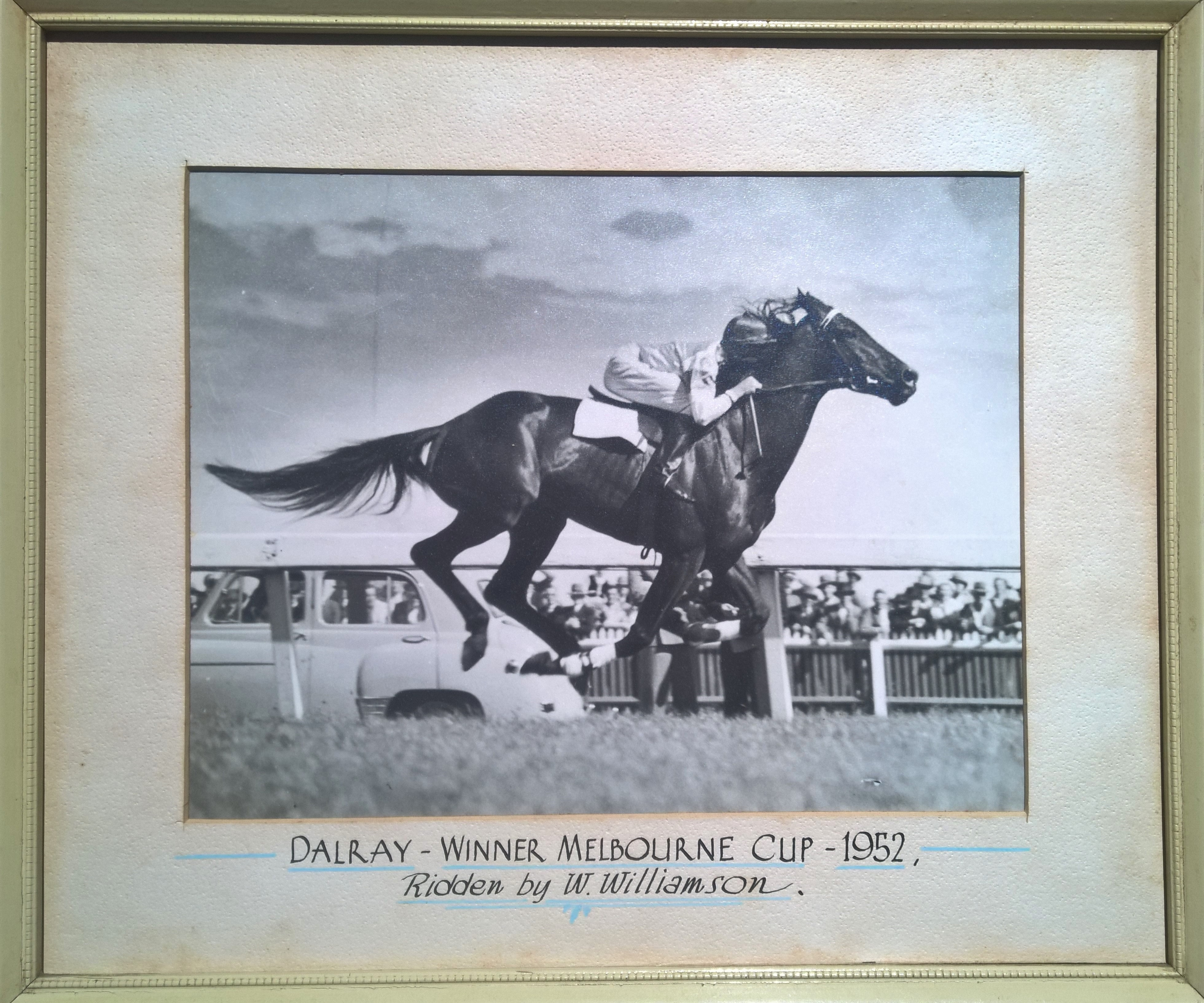
Dalray and Bill Williamson.

On 5 January 1942 was called upon to serve in the military, where he worked as a driver with the 119th General Transport Company. Williamson was released two and a half years later on 30 October 1944, when he once again turned to developing his horseracing career.

He married Zelma Ava Dickman, a hairdresser on 17 January 1949 at St Paul's Church of England, in Caulfield, Melbourne. Williamson won his first Victorian jockey premiership in the 1951-52 season and rode the horse Dalray to a victory in the 1952 Melbourne Cup. He went on to win five more, and won the W. S. Cox Plate and Brisbane Cup in 1953, a season where he set a Victorian record with 67 and a half winners. He later won the Duke of Edinburgh Australian Cup (1954) but faced a setback in October of that year when a fall nearly cost him his life and put him out of racing for nine months. Recovering from his injuries, he went on to win the Caulfield Cup in 1955 on the famous horse Rising Fast and Ilumquh in 1960 amongst others.

He moved to Ireland in 1960 and later to England which he won a number of important mainstream races throughout the 1960s such as the 1,000 Guineas in 1962 on Abermaid and Night Off in 1965. Williamson won the Prix de l'Arc de Triomphe at Longchamp, Paris, in 1968 and 1969 which brought him significant praise, notably from Lester Piggott. In total he won 8 Classic Races in Ireland, 2 Classic Races in England and 3 Classic Races in mainland Europe, including France in 1971.

He retired from professional racing in 1973 when he took up a new job as a racing manager for the Indian shipping magnate Ravi Tikkoo.

He returned to his native Melbourne in 1977 but developed cancer, and died on 28 January 1979 in South Caulfield Melbourne. He is buried at the Cheltenham Memorial Park (Wangara Road).

== The Australian years ==
Apprentice Bill Williamson rode his first winner in 1937, but it was only after he was discharged from the army, where he served as a driver with the 119th General Transport Company, after which his career gathered pace. Much of Williamson’s early success came from his association with trainers Lou Robertson and Fred Hoysted, both members of the Racing’s Hall of Fame. His greatest success came in the 1952 Melbourne Cup when he rode Dalray to victory (with a broken left arm, being an injury sustained during a fall some three weeks before). He twice won the Caulfield Cup on Rising Fast in 1955 and Ilumquh 1960. He won the Victorian Jockey’s Premiership in six of the eight years, before he headed abroad in 1960, where he rode until his retirement in 1973.

Williamson rode with great distinction in England, Ireland and Europe winning thirteen classic races, eight in Ireland, two in England and three in Europe. "He and Scobie Breasley were the best two jockeys I’ve ever seen," International jockey Ron Hutchison said, "he was extremely patient, sitting and waiting until the final three hundreds to take off. He was just a wonderful stylist, so nice to watch, a straight back, low in the saddle and perfect balance."

The sleepy eyed Williamson (dubbed "Weary Willy" by the English press due to his sleepy eyes) was an exceptionally modest man with an intense dislike for self-promotion. He never bothered to add up the number of winners he rode, and was vague about his achievements and the names of champions he had ridden. Once asked why he did not smile after he had won, "because half an hour later I might get beat on a favourite and I was sorry I smiled." He also said "who smiles, really, when they are working?"

He became interested in horses as a child because of the achievements of his mother's uncle Bobby Lewis, a famous jockey (four times winner of Melbourne Cup). The family came from Epsom in Victoria and bought Bill a pony when he was only seven. As his skills improved, trainer Alex McCracken allowed him to work his horse at the track at Mentone. As soon as he could leave school, he became an apprentice to Fred Lewis, Bob's brother at Epsom.

His first winner came at Epsom in 1937 on a horse called Lilirene, the last winner Bobby Lewis rode to victory ironically. Lewis was a hard master and pointed out so many faults in Williamson's riding, that he wondered how the boy managed to stay on.

Williamson spent 18 months in the army as a driver with the 119th General Transport Company in World War 2, but in 1944, on a leave of absence, he rode Lawrence into second place in the Caulfield Cup won by Counsel. He believed Lawrence would have won the race had it been at Flemington as it had been for the previous four years during the war. He won the VRC St Leger that year on Lawrence and the VRC Sires Produce Stakes on Delina, both trained by Lou Robertson.

When he became the number one rider for the powerful Fred Hoysted, Williamson's career really took off. His association with Hoysted assured him rides on outstanding horses and, over the next 25 years, he rode hundreds of winners for the Hoysteds. He wins includes the 1955 Caulfield Cup on Rising Fast, on whom he ridden on 30 occasions, 1953 Maribyrnong Plate on the flying filly Fascinating, 1951 VRC St Leger on Midway, the 1950 VRC Oaks on the brilliant True Course and the three consecutive VRC Sire Produce Stakes on True Course in 1950, Usage in 1951 and Pure Fire in 1952.

Williamson is also remembered for his bad luck in the 1955 Melbourne Cup, in which Rising Fast was allegedly interfered with by Toporoa while the former was attempting to win the Caulfield Cup, Melbourne Cup double for the second consecutive year. The winner of the 1954-55 Caulfield Cups was allotted a massive 63.5kgs, (a greater weight than Phar Lap was asked to carry in the 1930 Melbourne Cup), when attempting to win his second straight Melbourne Cup. Rising Fast conceded 15.5kgs to Toporoa, who won by a length having moved out in the straight, some experts saying he took Rising Fast's running in doing so.

On lookers expected Williamson to fire in a protest against Sellwood on his return to scale. While none was forthcoming, Sellwood was suspended for two months for his interference in the race at an adjourned inquiry the next day. Williamson never elaborated on the incident but did confide with the co-writer of this biography, that the interference in question made no impact on the result as the horse was tiring under his huge weight of the time, but to others this explanation was not forthcoming and died with him.

He was also remembered for his part in the famous triple dead heat in the 1956 Hotham Handicap at Flemington, when his mount Pandie Sun, trained by the late Collin Hayes, shared the honours with Fighting Force (Jockey Jack Purtell) and Arc Royal (Jockey Reggie Heather).

== The European years ==
Williamson went to Europe in 1960 with wife Zelma and his two sons, spending two years in Ireland with Seamus McGrath, for whom he won several Irish classics. Having moved to England in 1962, Williamson won the Ascot Gold Cup, French Gold Cup and the Arc de Triomphe on Levmoss in 1969, a considerable feat in the same year considering the fact the horse was stylishly winning long distance races over 2.5–3 miles, having to revert to a mile and half against the cream of the crop of Europe to win Arc de Triomphe. Not only did he win this mile and half super classic, at odds of 50-1, he did it in record time (a magnificent feat). Williamson said to the co-writer, "who did you back? I bet you backed Lester (Piggott) on Park Top" who ran second - the disgruntled co-writer admitted he had.

He also won the Champions Stakes on the Irish trained Arctic Storm, and the Doncaster Cup on the Paddy Prendergast trained Canterbury.

Dubbed "Weary Willy" by the English press because of his sleepy eyes and lack of socialising, Williamson also won the classic One Thousand Guineas at Newmarket twice on Abermaid, trained by Harry Wragg, and Night Off, trained by Major Lionel Holiday, amongst many other major races.

He retired from professional racing in 1973 where he took up a new job as Racing Manager for the Indian shipping magnate, Ravi Tikkoo. After a most distinguished career in the saddle of some 37 years, he returned to Melbourne in 1976 at the age of 54 and became assistant start for the VRC and VATC until his death on 28 January 1979.
