= Gloaming (horse) =

Australian-bred Thoroughbred racehorse

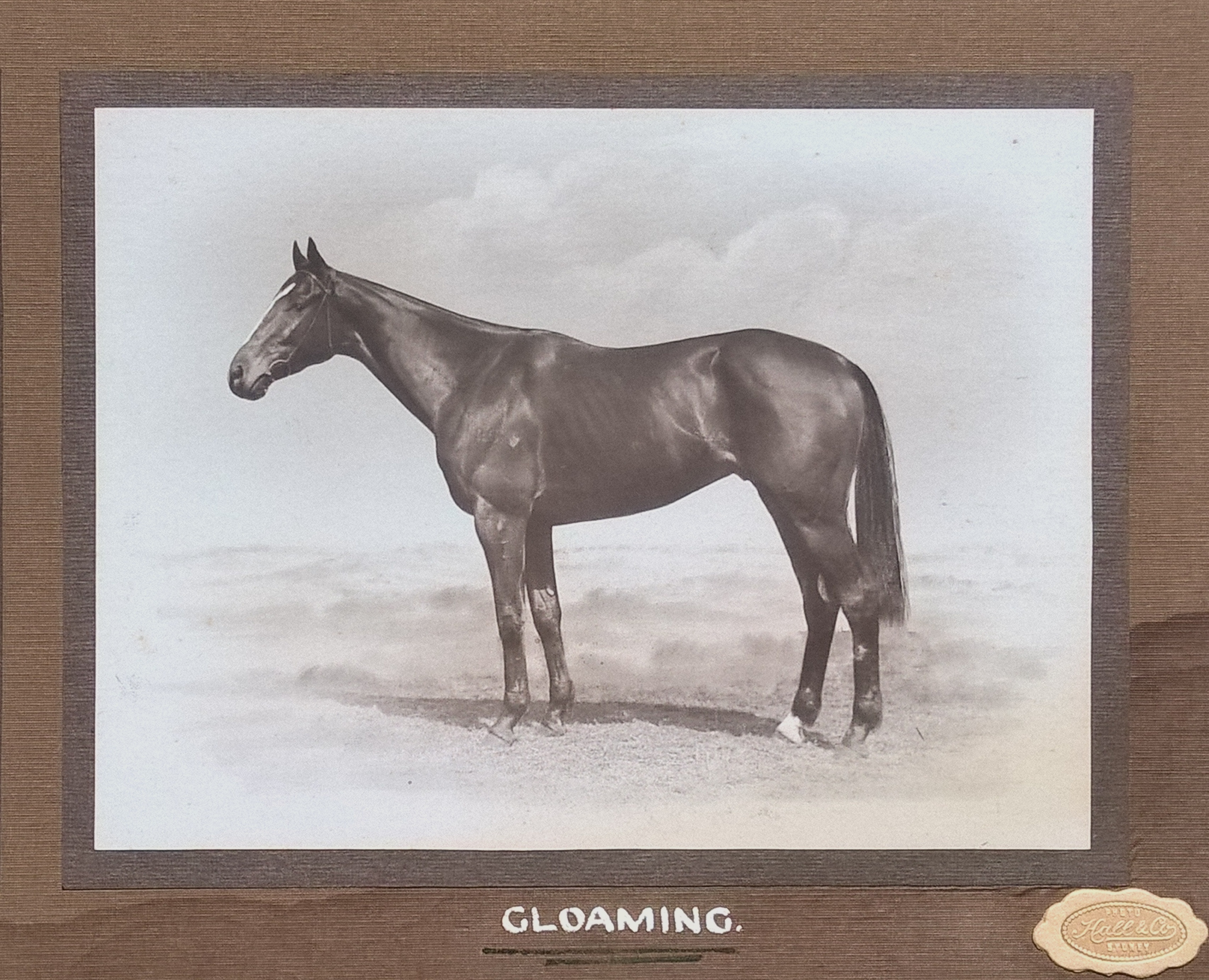
- Sire: The Welkin (GB)
- Grandsire: Flying Fox
- Dam: Light (GB)
- Damsire: Eager
- Sex: Gelding
- Foaled: 1915
- Country: Australia
- Colour: Bay
- Breeder: E.E.D. Clarke, Melton stud, Victoria
- Owner: George D. Greenwood
- Trainer: Dick Mason
- Record: 67: 57-9-0
- Earnings: £43,100

Major wins
- Chelmsford Stakes (1918); AJC Derby (1918); New Zealand Derby (1918); Wanganui Guineas (1918); Great Northern Derby (1919); Arc Islington Plate (1918, 1919, 1920); WRC Wellington Stakes (1919); WANGJC Jackson Stakes (1919, 1921, 1922, 1924); North Island Challenge Stakes (1922, 1924, 1925); Craven Plate (1919, 1922, 1924); Hill Stakes (1922); Ormond Memorial Gold Cup (1922, 1925); Melbourne Stakes (1924); AJC Spring Stakes (1924)

Honours
- Australian Racing Hall of Fame; New Zealand Racing Hall of Fame (2006); Gloaming Stakes run at Rosehill Racecourse
- Last updated on 6 September 2010

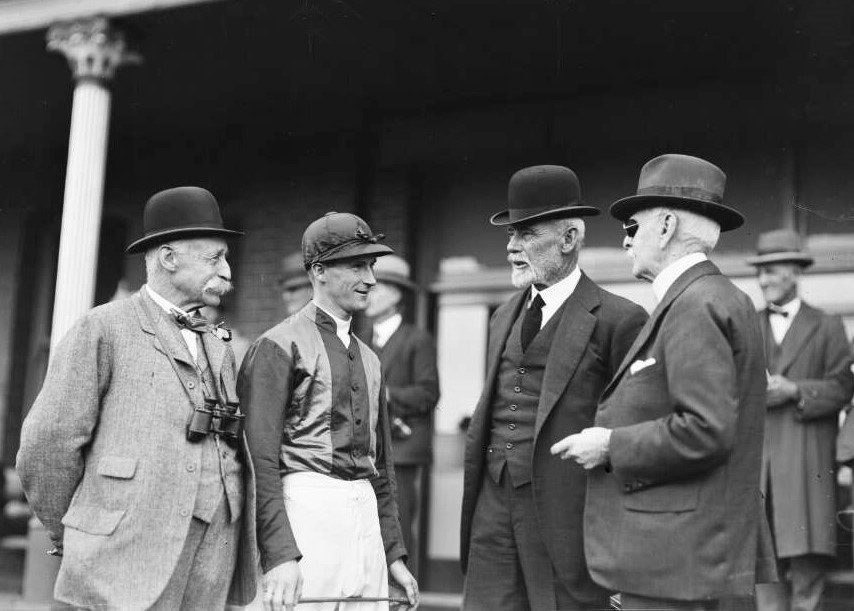
L - R George Greenwood, George Young & Dick Mason.

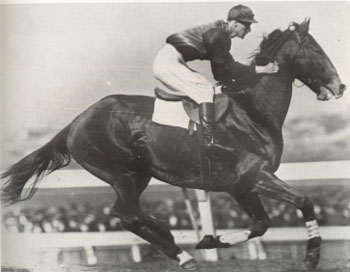
Gloaming

Gloaming (September 1915 – 5 May 1932) was an outstanding Thoroughbred racehorse, owned, trained, and based in New Zealand. He set many records which included the Australasian record (jointly held with Desert Gold, Black Caviar and Winx) of 19 successive wins, many in Principal Races. Gloaming was unusual in that he was a champion who won many major races in both Australia and New Zealand. Gloaming still holds the Australasian record of 45 seconds for four furlongs.

== Breeding ==
He was a robust bay gelding standing 15 hands 3 inches high with a good length of rein. Gloaming was sired by the good imported racehorse and sire, The Welkin (GB) out of the unplaced mare, Light (GB), by the good sire, Eager. His paternal grandsire was the English Triple Crown champion, Flying Fox. Gloaming was a brother to seven other named horses, all by The Welkin, including Gloaming's Sister (won AJC Kirkham Stakes), but none were nearly so successful as him. Light was inbred in the third generation (3x3) to Sterling.

Gloaming was sold as a yearling in 1916 for 230 guineas to H. Chisholm acting on behalf of George D. Greenwood, of Teviotdale in the Canterbury region, New Zealand. Following the sale he made his first of 15 crossings of the Tasman Sea.

== Racing record ==
Gloaming had a long career, racing from age three to nine years, which included victories over other champion racehorses such as Desert Gold, Beauford, Kennaquhair, Whittier and The Hawk. He was successful at distances from four furlongs to a mile and a half.

He was put into work as a two-year-old, but became shin-sore, and was gelded before being spelled. In June 1918 he was shipped to Sydney, after he had shown promise in track work in New Zealand.

=== 1922 racebook ===
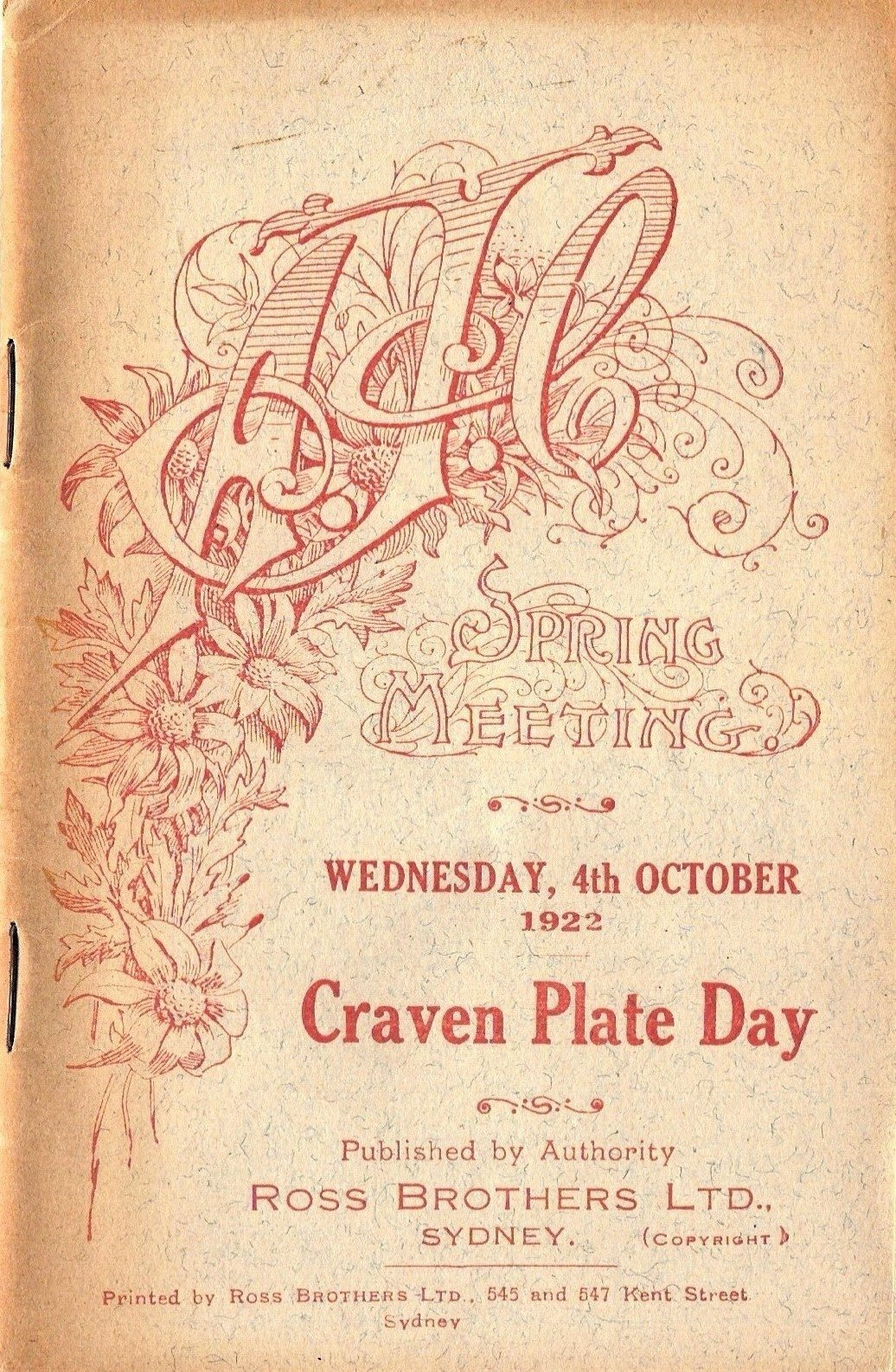
1922 AJC Craven Plate racebook front cover

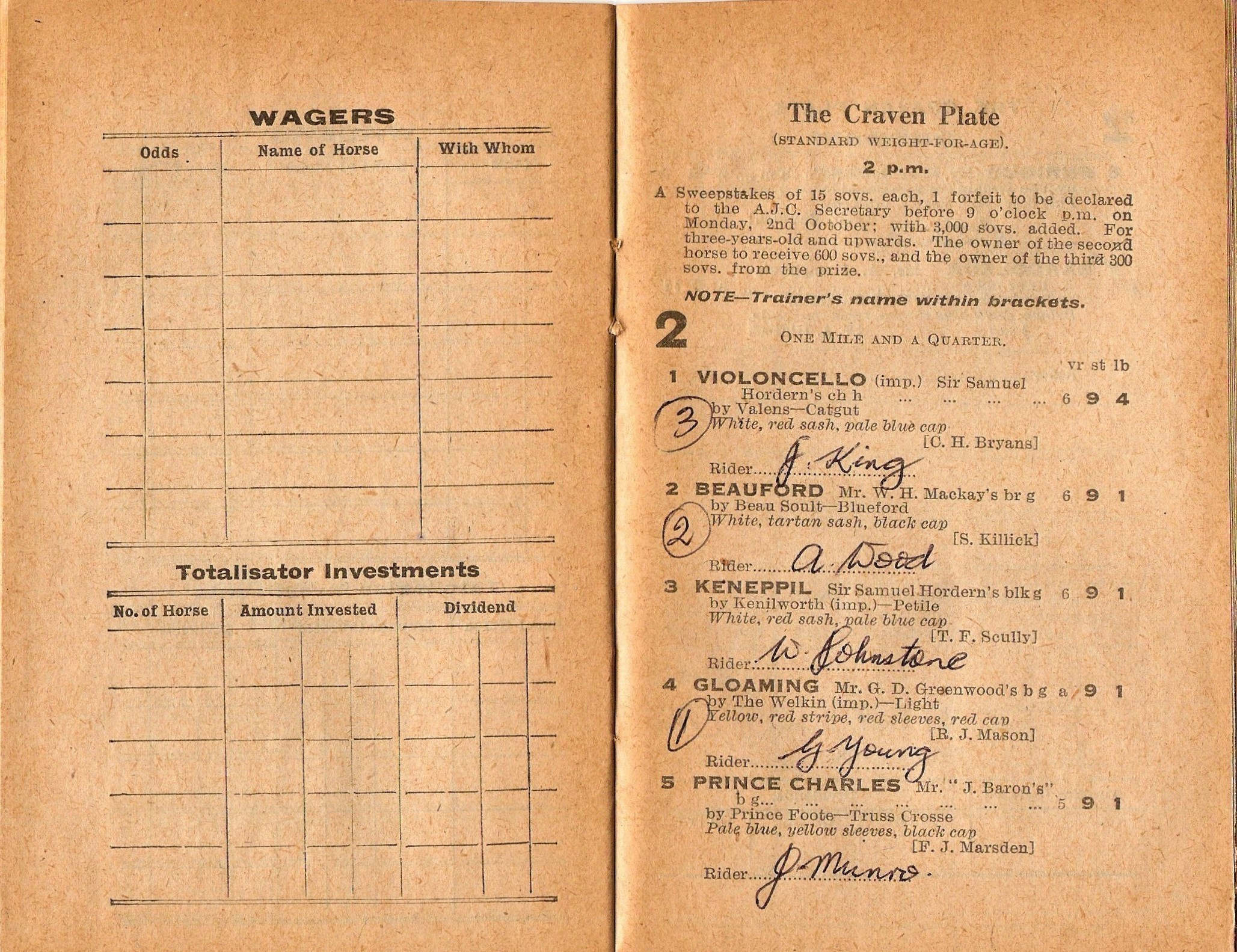
1922 AJC Craven Plate showing the winner, Gloaming

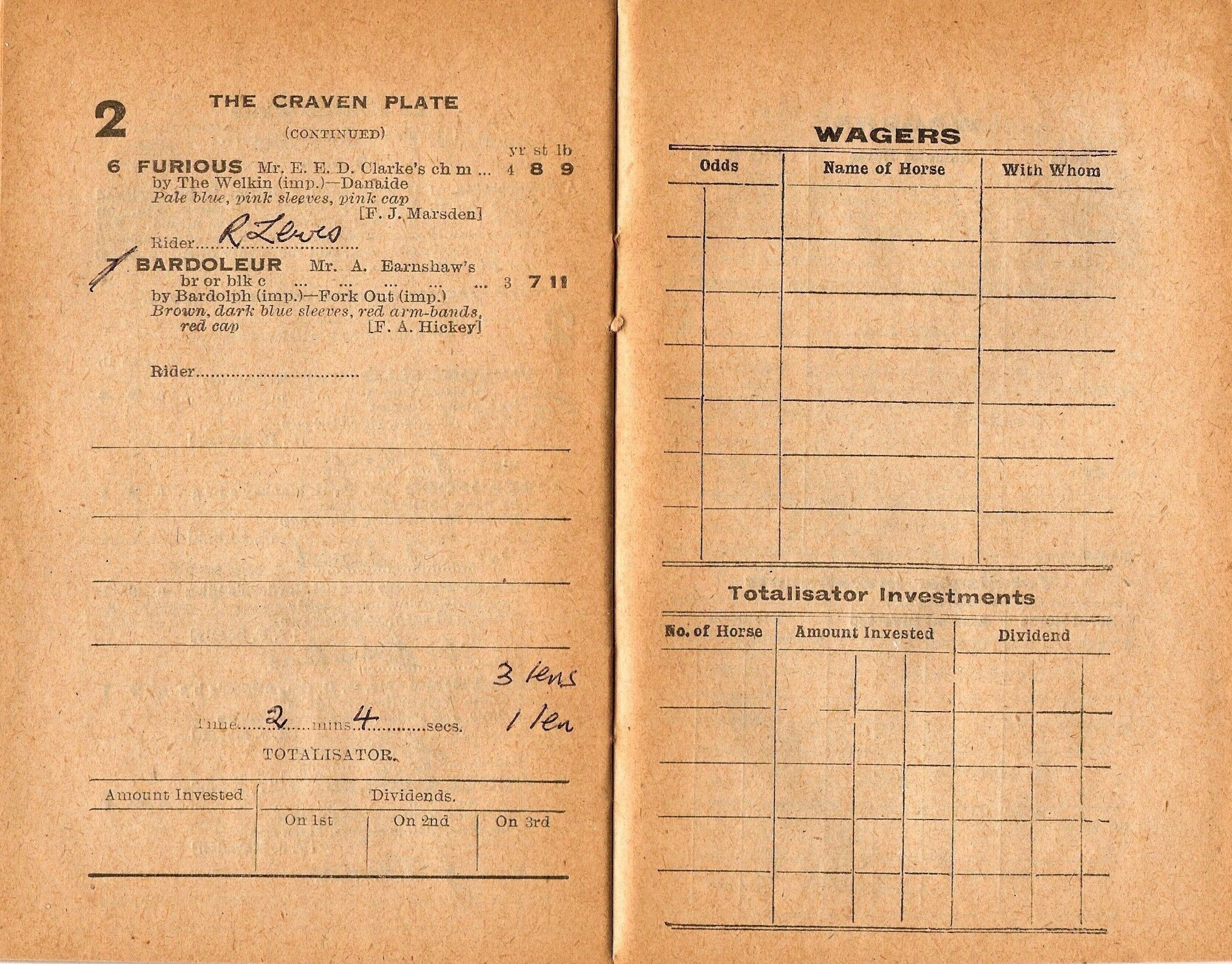
1922 AJC Craven Plate starters and results

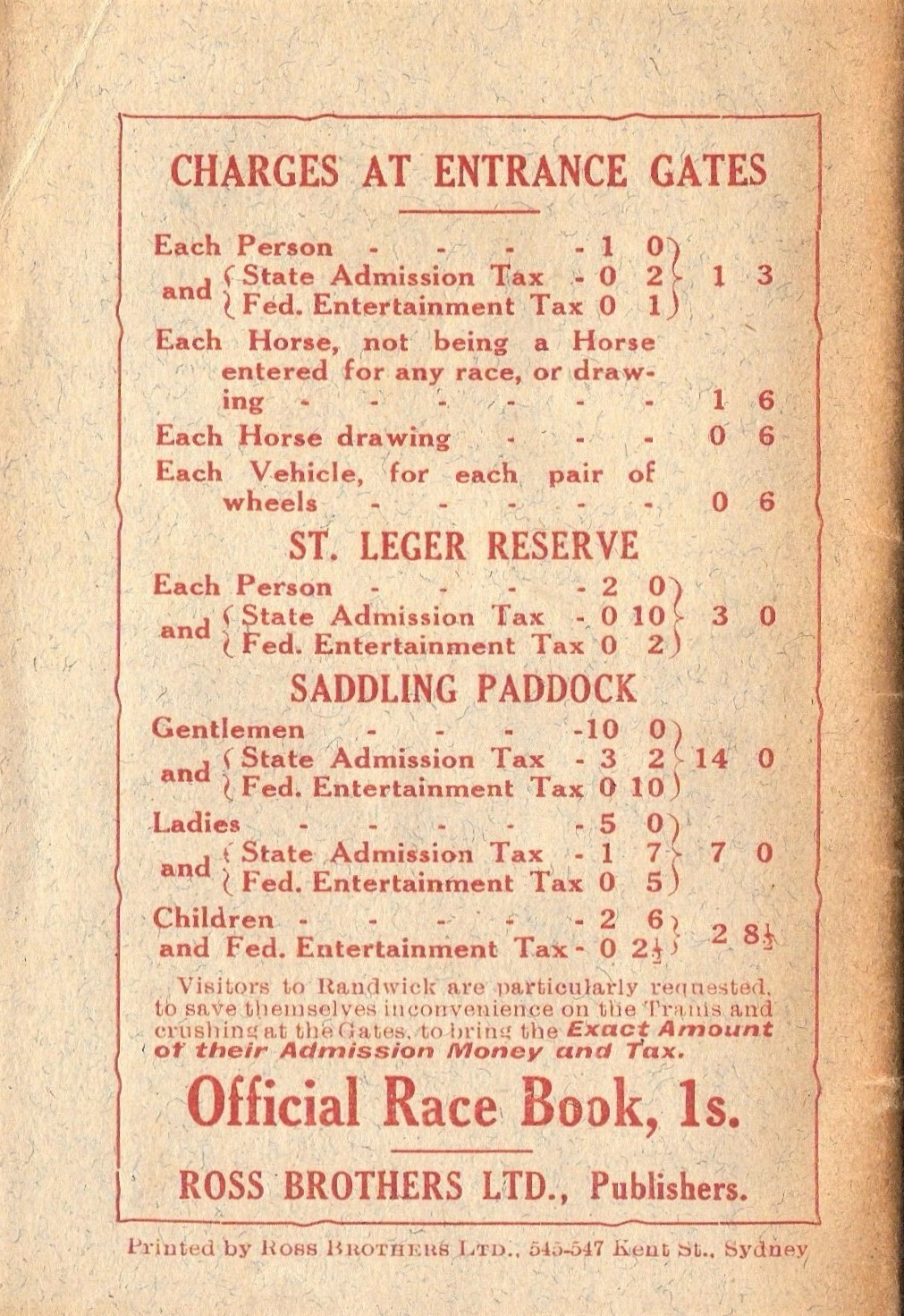
Back cover showing charges at the entrance gates

=== At three years: 1918-19 ===
At his first start, in the Sydney Tattersall's Chelmsford Stakes, over nine furlongs, he ran a race record time to defeat a class field that included the imported five-year-old Rebus and Kennaquhair. This was the first time this race had been won by a three-year-old having their first start. In his first season's racing Gloaming went on to win three Derbies, the AJC Australian Derby, the New Zealand Derby Stakes, and also the Great Northern Derby in New Zealand. In addition he

- won the 1918 Wellington R.C. (WRC) Champion Plate weight for age (w.f.a.) over 10 furlongs by 2 1/2 lengths
- 2nd in G. G. Stead Memorial Stakes (w.f.a.) (defeated by the New Zealand Cup winner, Sasanof).
- won Auckland Racing Club (ARC) Islington Plate (w.f.a.) 1 mile.
- won Wellington Stakes 5 furlongs in 58 3/5 seconds (race record)
- won WeRC Kelburn Plate (w.f.a.) 4 fur. (defeating Surveyor)
- 2nd in Taranaki Stakes (defeated by Desert Gold).
- won Egmont Stakes (defeating Desert Gold).
- won Hawera Stakes (defeating Desert Gold)
- won WangJC Wanganui Jackson Stakes (w.f.a.) 6 fur.
- won WangJC Wanganui Guineas, 1 mile
- won Canterbury Jockey Club (CJC) Challenge Stakes, 7 fur. (defeating Surveyor).
- fell in the North Island Challenge Stakes (which was won by Warplane who was in receipt of 31 lb.).

=== At four years: 1919-20 ===
Gloaming won all but one of his starts during this season. All of his starts for this season are listed below:

- won Rosehill Spring Stakes (w.f.a.) 1 mile (defeating Wolaroi and Prince Viridis).
- 2nd in Australian Jockey Club (AJC) Spring Stakes (w.f.a.) (beaten a head by Poitrel; Cetigne 3rd), 12 furlongs
- won AJC Craven Plate (w.f.a.) 10 furlongs (defeating Wolaroi and, Rebus 3rd, Sasanof).
- won Wellington (N.Z.) Champion Plate (w.f.a.) 10 f (defeating Affectation, Mascot, Vagabond, and Desert Gold).
- won G. G. Stead Memorial Gold Cup, 10 f (defeating Rossini and Desert Gold).
- won ARC Islington Plate (w.f.a.) 1 mile
- won ARC. Royal Park Stakes, 6 furlongs in 1:13 (race record)

=== At five years: 1920-21 ===
As a five-year-old Gloaming had 15 race starts and won all of them including these principal races:

- 1920 ARC Islington Plate (w.f.a.) 8 f
- 1920 ARC Royal Stakes 6 f
- 1921 ARC Auckland Plate (w.f.a.) 12 f
- 1921 CJC Challenge Stakes 7 f
- 1921 TaraJC Taranaki Stakes 6 f
- 1921 WangJC Jackson Stakes (w.f.a.) 6 f

=== At six years: 1921-22 ===
As a six-year-old Gloaming had 12 race starts and won all but one, in which he ran second. The principal races he won were:

- 1922 ARC Auckland Plate 12 furlongs
- 1922 TaraJC Taranaki Stakes 6 furlongs
- 1922 WangJC Jackson Stakes (w.f.a.) 6 furlongs, in 1:11 4/5, a race record
- 1922 WRC North Island Challenge Stakes 7 furlongs
- 1922 CJC Challenge Stakes 7 furlongs
- 1922 HBJC Ormond Memorial Gold Cup 8 furlongs.

=== At seven years: 1922-23 ===
As a seven-year-old Gloaming had 5 starts for 3 wins and 2 seconds. The principal races he won were:

- 1922 RRC The Hill Stakes 10 f by 1 1/4 lengths from Beauford
- 1922 AJC Craven Plate Pr 10 f by 3 lengths from Beauford
- 1922 WRC Champion Plate (w.f.a.) 10 f with 9 st. 4 lbs. (59 kg) in 2:6 1/5 a race record.

=== At eight years: 1923-24 ===
As an eight-year-old Gloaming had 5 starts for 4 wins and 1 second. The principal races he won were:

- 1924 WangJC Jackson Stakes (w.f.a.) 6 f
- 1924 WeRC North Island Challenge Stakes with 10.1 (defeating Quiescent 6.12 by 6 lengths), 7 fur. in 1:27 4/5.

=== At nine years: 1924-25 ===
As a nine-year-old Gloaming had 10 starts for 8 wins and 2 seconds. The principal races he won were:

- 1924 AJC Spring Stakes over 12 furlongs (defeating David, Ballymena, and Rivoli).
- 1924 AJC Craven Plate over 10 f (defeating Ballymena, David, and Nigger Ministrel).
- 1924 VRC Melbourne Stakes (w.f.a.) 10 f.
- 1925 Canterbury (N.Z.) Middle Park Plate, 6 fur. with 9 st. 10 lb. by 5 lengths with the 3rd horse a further 3 lengths away.
- 1925 WRC North Island Challenge Stakes 7 f. with 10.1 (Inferno 8.13, and), 7 fur. in 1.26.
- 1925 CJC Challenge Stakes 7 f. with 9.11
- 1925 HBJC Ormond Memorial Gold Cup 8 furlongs with 9.10 (beating The Hawk 9.10)

=== Summary ===
Gloaming had 67 race starts, won 57 (including 39 Principal Races) and was second 9 times. Gloaming fell in his only other race start, at barrier rise in the North Island Challenge Stakes which was a race he later won three times. When he retired he was the leading Australian racing stakes winner. He was the first horse to defeat the great mare, Desert Gold over a mile and he still holds the Australasian record of 45 seconds for four furlongs. He jointly held the Australasian record of 19 wins in succession with Desert Gold, whom he met five times and defeated four times. The record is now held at 33 wins by Winx.

When Gloaming was retired from the turf to his owner's property at Teviotdale, he was the leading stakes-winner in Australasia with fifty-seven wins and £43,100 in prize-money. He died on 5 May 1932.

== Honours ==
Gloaming has had his portrait painted by the noted equine artist, Martin Stainforth and it was reproduced in Racehorses in Australia.

Gloaming was one of five inaugural inductees into the New Zealand Racing Hall of Fame, alongside Carbine, Kindergarten, Phar Lap and Sunline. The Group Three Gloaming Stakes (1,800m) contested at Sydney's Rosehill Gardens Racecourse is named in his honour.

== See also ==
- List of racehorses
- List of leading Thoroughbred racehorses
- Repeat winners of horse races
