= Beau Vite =

New Zealand Thoroughbred racehorse

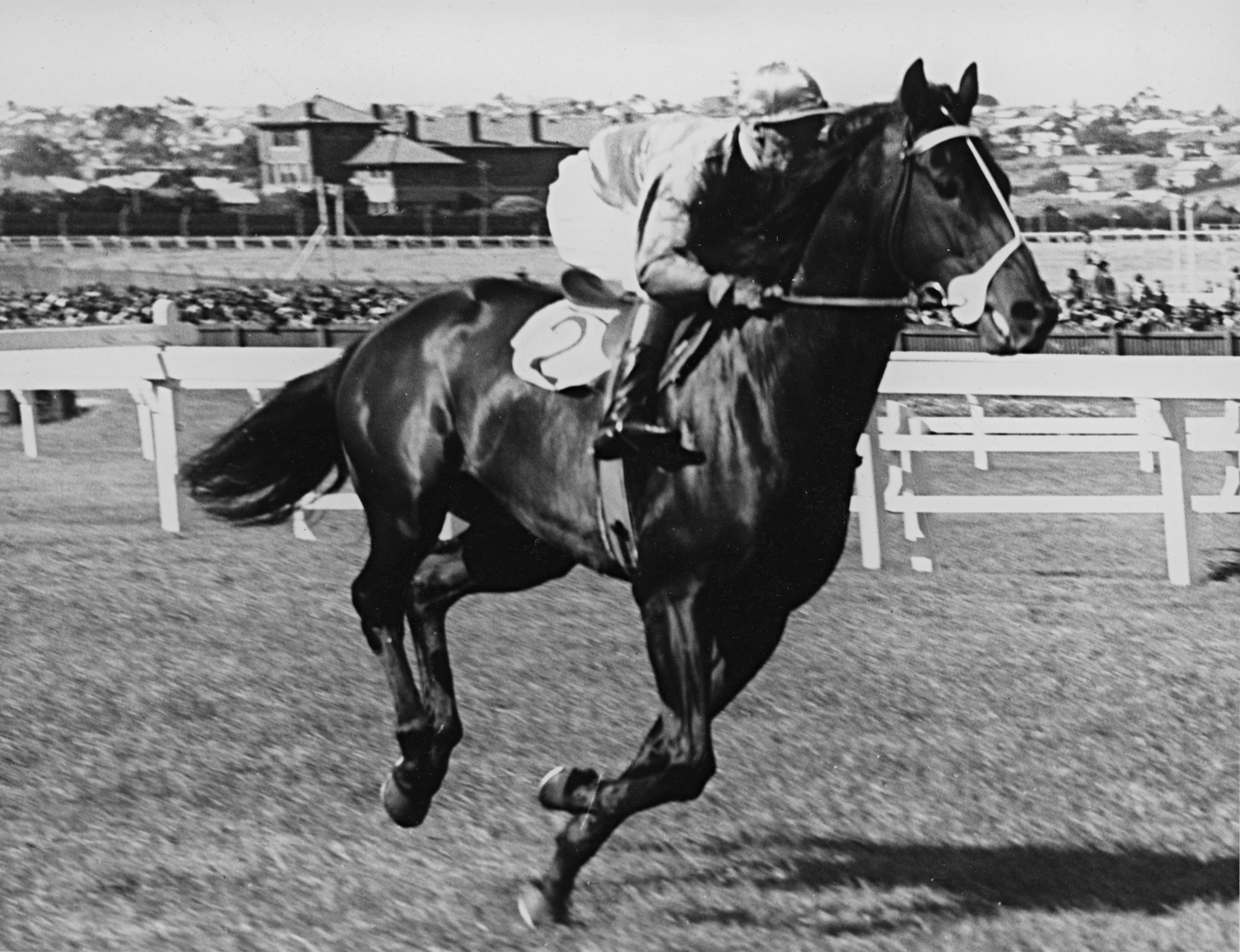
- Beau Vite and Ted McMenamin
- Sire: Beau Pere (GB)
- Grandsire: Son- In- Law (GB)
- Dam: Dominant (NZ)
- Damsire: Martian (NZ)
- Sex: Stallion
- Foaled: 1936
- Country: New Zealand
- Colour: Brown
- Breeder: J.Curran
- Owner: Ralph Stewart
- Trainer: T.R. George; F. McGrath Snr
- Record: 60: 31,9,5
- Earnings: £26,680

Major wins
- Canterbury Stakes (1939); Metropolitan Handicap (1940); Hill Stakes (1940); Great Northern Derby (1940); Auckland Cup (1940); Awapuni Gold Cup (1940); Clifford Plate (1940,1941); Colin Stephen Stakes (1940,1941); Craven Plate (1940,1941); W. S. Cox Plate (1940,1941); LKS Mackinnon Stakes (1940,1941); Rawson Stakes (1941); AJC Plate (1941); Chelmsford Stakes (1941); AJC Autumn Plate (1941,1942)

Honours
- New Zealand Racing Hall of Fame; Australian Racing Hall of Fame

Beau Vite was a New Zealand-bred brown Thoroughbred Stallion, who developed into a grand stayer performing in New Zealand and Australia and raced from a two-year-old to a five-year-old on wet or dry tracks recording 31 wins from 5 furlongs to 2¼ miles. Beau Vite is a member of the Australian Racing Hall of Fame.

== Breeding ==
Beau Pere (GB) sire of Beau Vite was a highly successful sire in three of four countries standing at stud. Beau Vite was bred by Mr J.Curran from Shannon, New Zealand and sold as a yearling to owner Ralph Stewart at the Wellington National sales for 900 guineas.

Dam Dominant (NZ) was purchased by Mr C.R.Bidwell for 200 guineas and raced by Mr J.A Taylor for 3 seasons winning only a trial hack race at Napier, New Zealand.

== Racing career ==
Beau Vite raced between 1938 and 1942 and raced for four seasons a dual W. S. Cox Plate winner in 1940 and 1941 when ridden by Ted McMenamin and Darby Munro. Defeated rival champions Ajax, High Caste, Tranquil Star and Beaulivre throughout career and in 1942 was retired to St Aubins stud Scone. Beau Vite's racing colours were Red, yellow spots, red cap in Australia.

Owner Ralph Stewart was born in Queensland a soldier in the Boer war established himself in the hotel business New Zealand and on his retirement entered the horse racing industry.

Trainer Frank McGrath senior (1866–1947) a former jockey who progressed from training ponies at Canterbury to master trainer of multiple classic winners in the champions Peter Pan, Amounis and Prince Foote from Randwick Racecourse his stables were located at 158 Doncaster Ave Kensington.

Beau Vite's racing record: 60 starts for 31 wins, 9 seconds, 5 thirds.

=== 1942 racebook ===
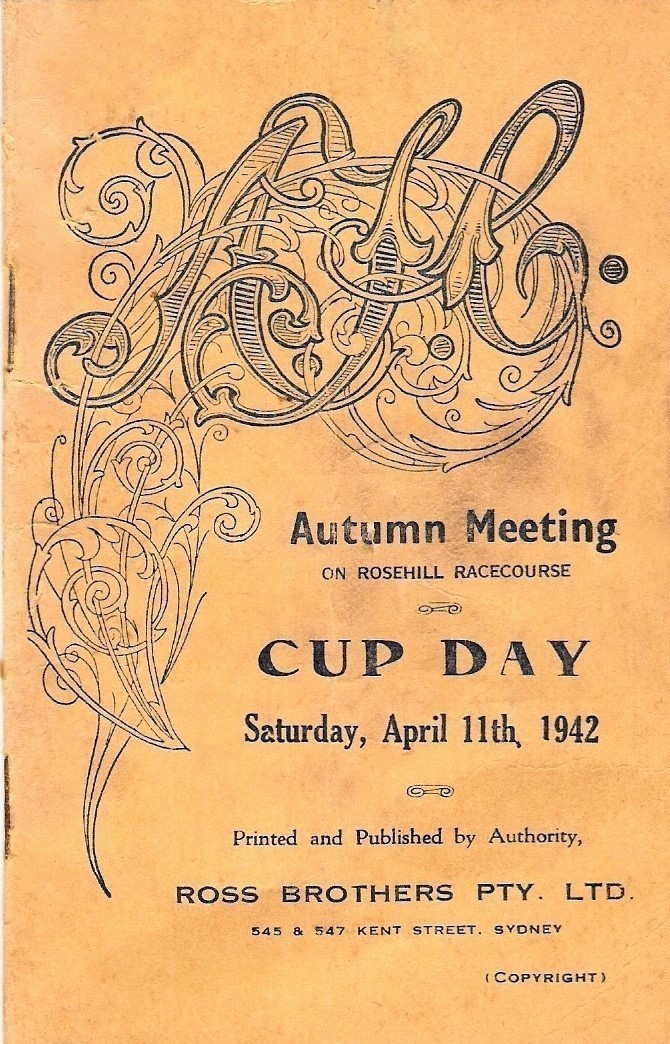
1942 Sydney Cup racebook front cover.

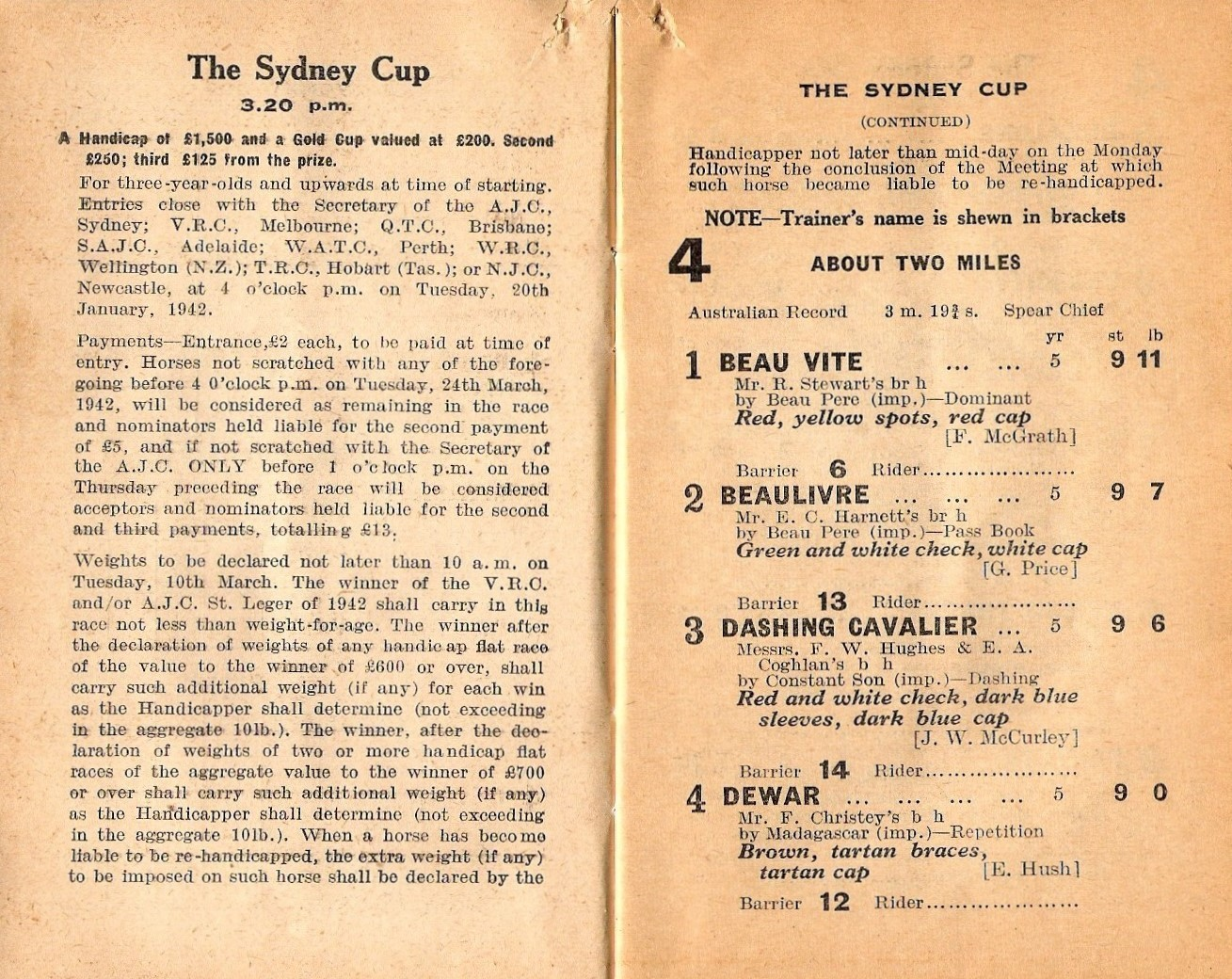
1942 Sydney Cup showing Beau Vite last career start 3rd placed.

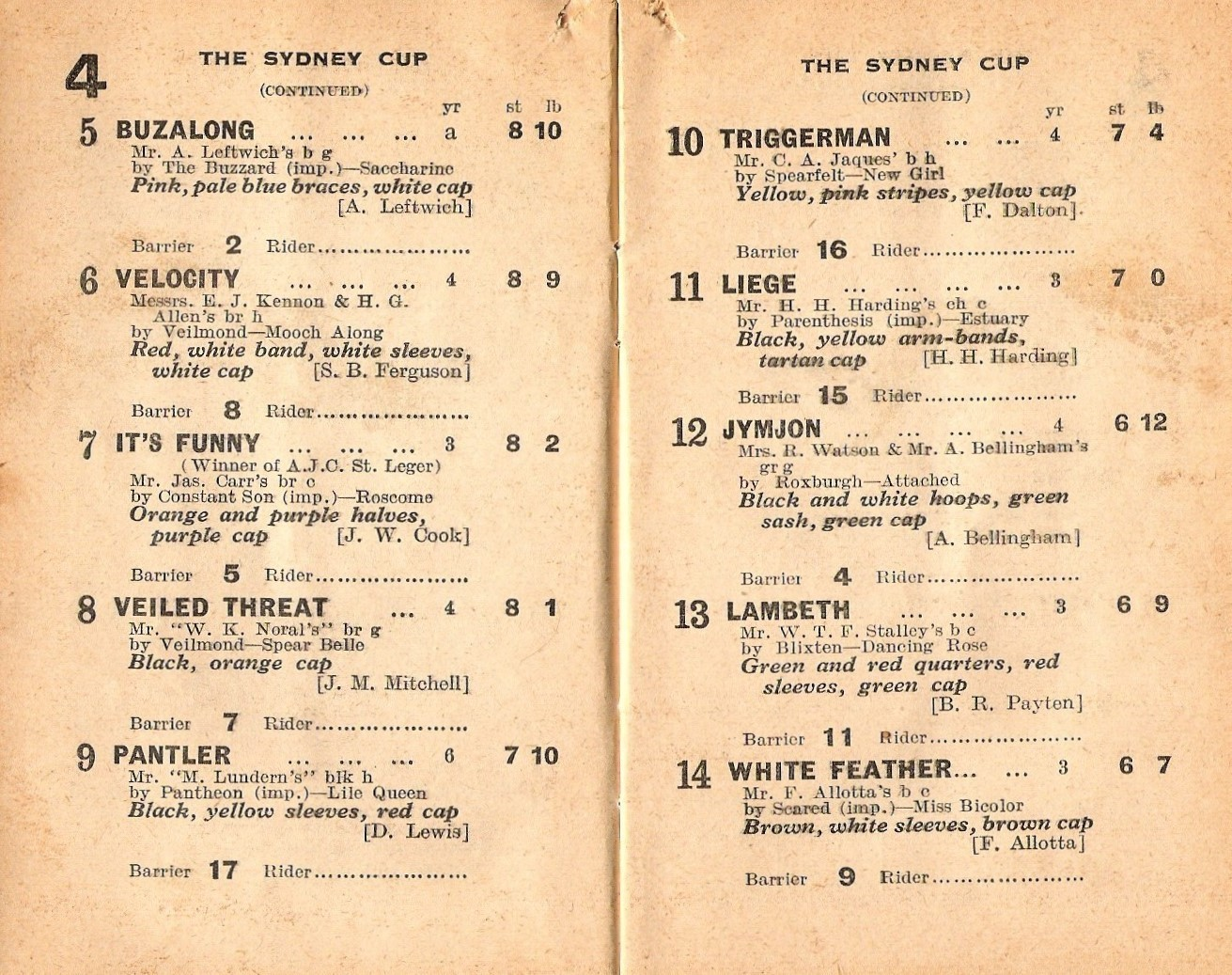
1942 Sydney Cup racebook showing the winner, Veiled Threat.

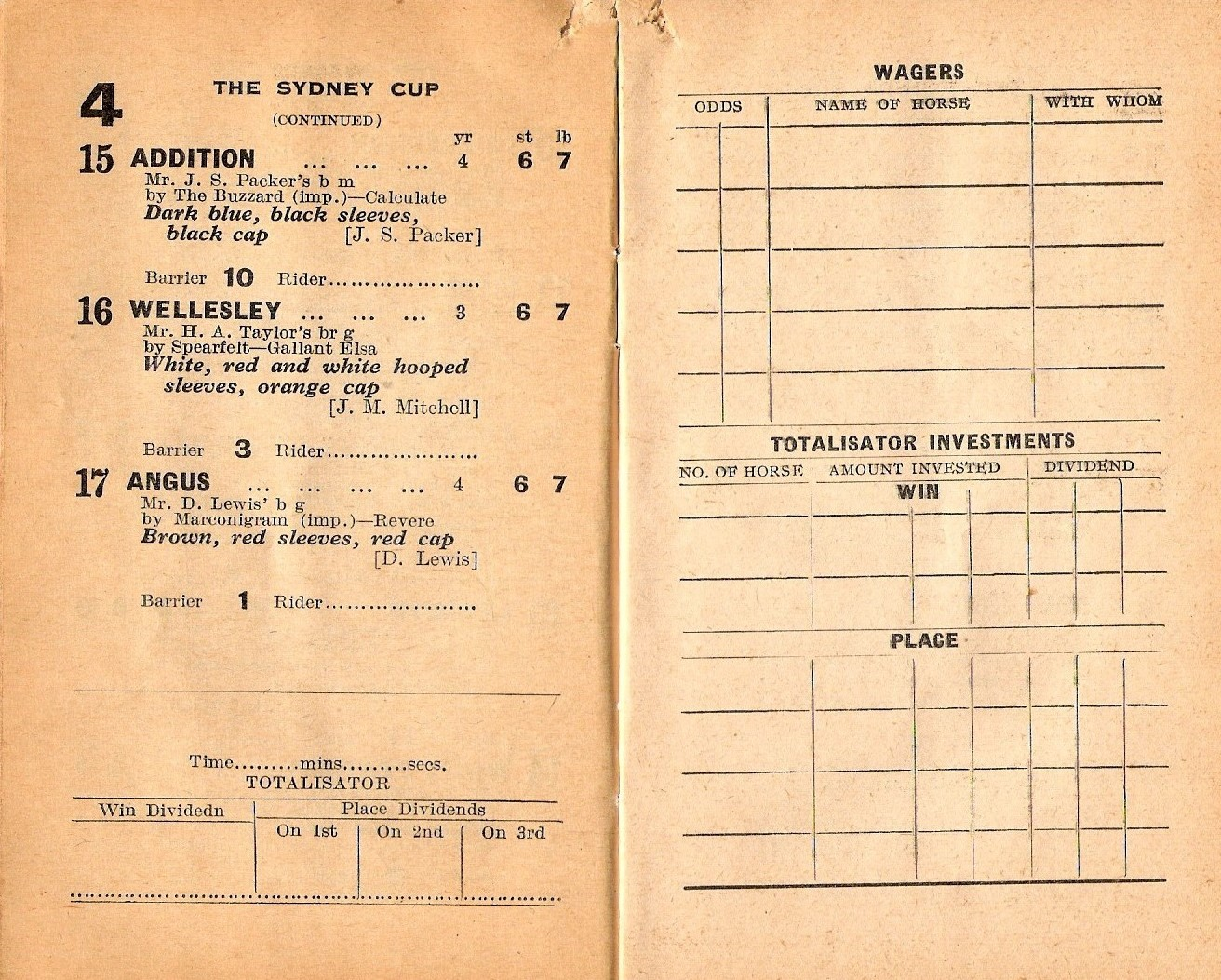
1942 Sydney Cup racebook.

== See also ==
- Thoroughbred racing in New Zealand
