= Dalray =

20th-century New Zealand racehorse

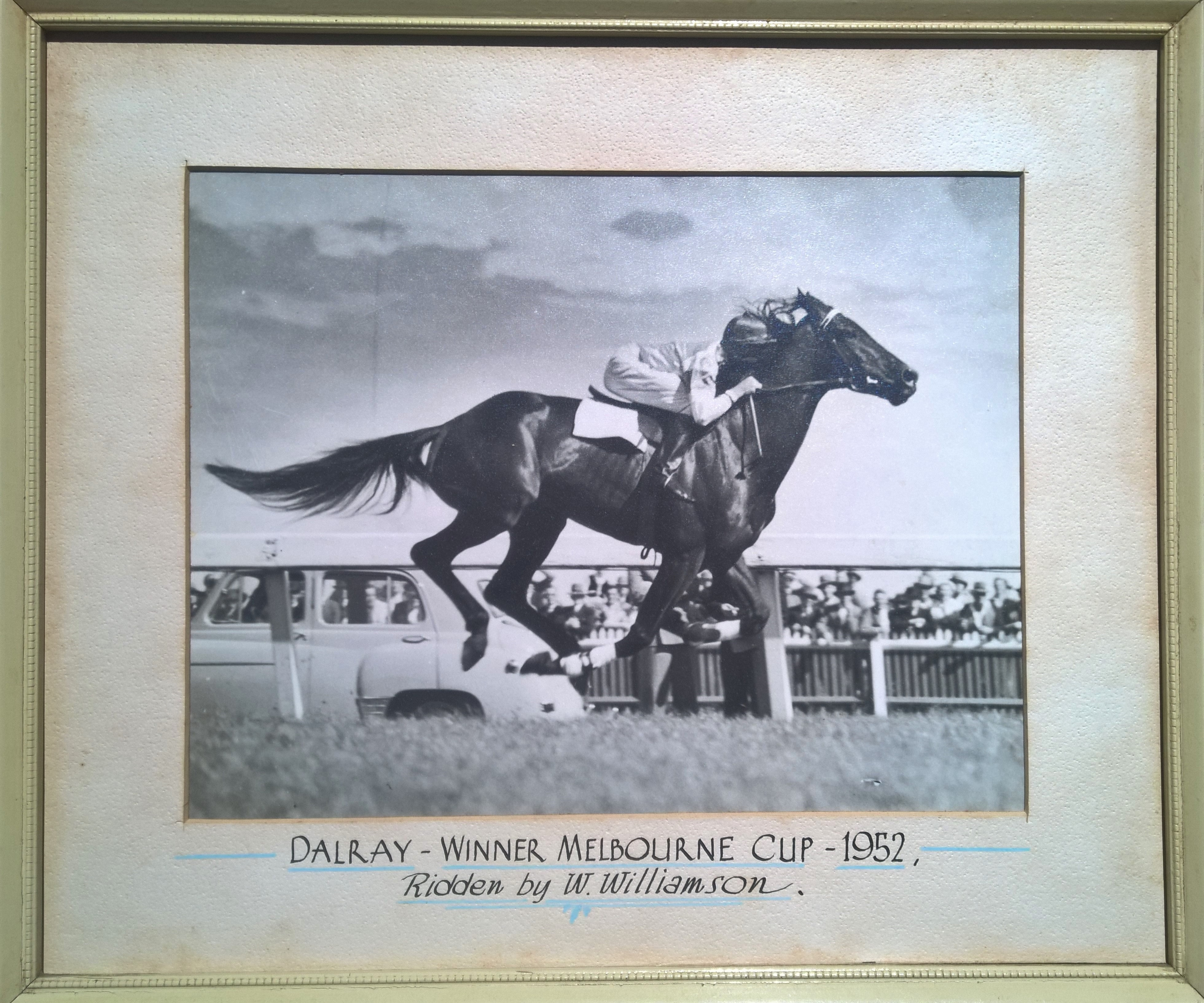
- Dalray and Bill Williamson
- Sire: Balloch (GB)
- Grandsire: Obliterate (GB)
- Dam: Broiveine (NZ)
- Damsire: Broiefort (FR)
- Sex: Stallion
- Foaled: 1948
- Died: 1971
- Country: New Zealand
- Colour: Bay
- Owner: Cyril Neville
- Trainer: Clarrie McCarthy
- Record: 27:14–2–3

Major wins
- New Zealand Derby (1951); Great Northern Derby (1952); Trentham Stakes (1952); New Zealand St. Leger (1952); Colin Stephen Stakes (1952); AJC Autumn Stakes (1952); Metropolitan Handicap (1952); LKS Mackinnon Stakes (1952); Melbourne Cup (1952); VRC Queens Plate (1953)

Honours
- Australian Racing Hall of Fame
- Last updated on 28 December 2012

Dalray (1948−1971) was a notable New Zealand thoroughbred racehorse who won the 1952 Melbourne Cup and Mackinnon Stakes.

Dalray was also famously a ‘certainty’ beaten in the 1952 Sydney Cup. When his owner was quizzed about the defeat he declared "Phar Lap got beaten and Bradman got a duck".

Dalray's career was cut short by injury when he was a four-year-old and he was retired to stud. Among his better progeny were Tails (1969 and 1970 Metropolitan Handicap) and Grand Garry (1960 Sydney Cup).

Dalray died in 1971 from a twisted bowel, aged 23.

== See also ==
- Thoroughbred racing in New Zealand
