= Limerick (horse) =

New Zealand Thoroughbred racehorse

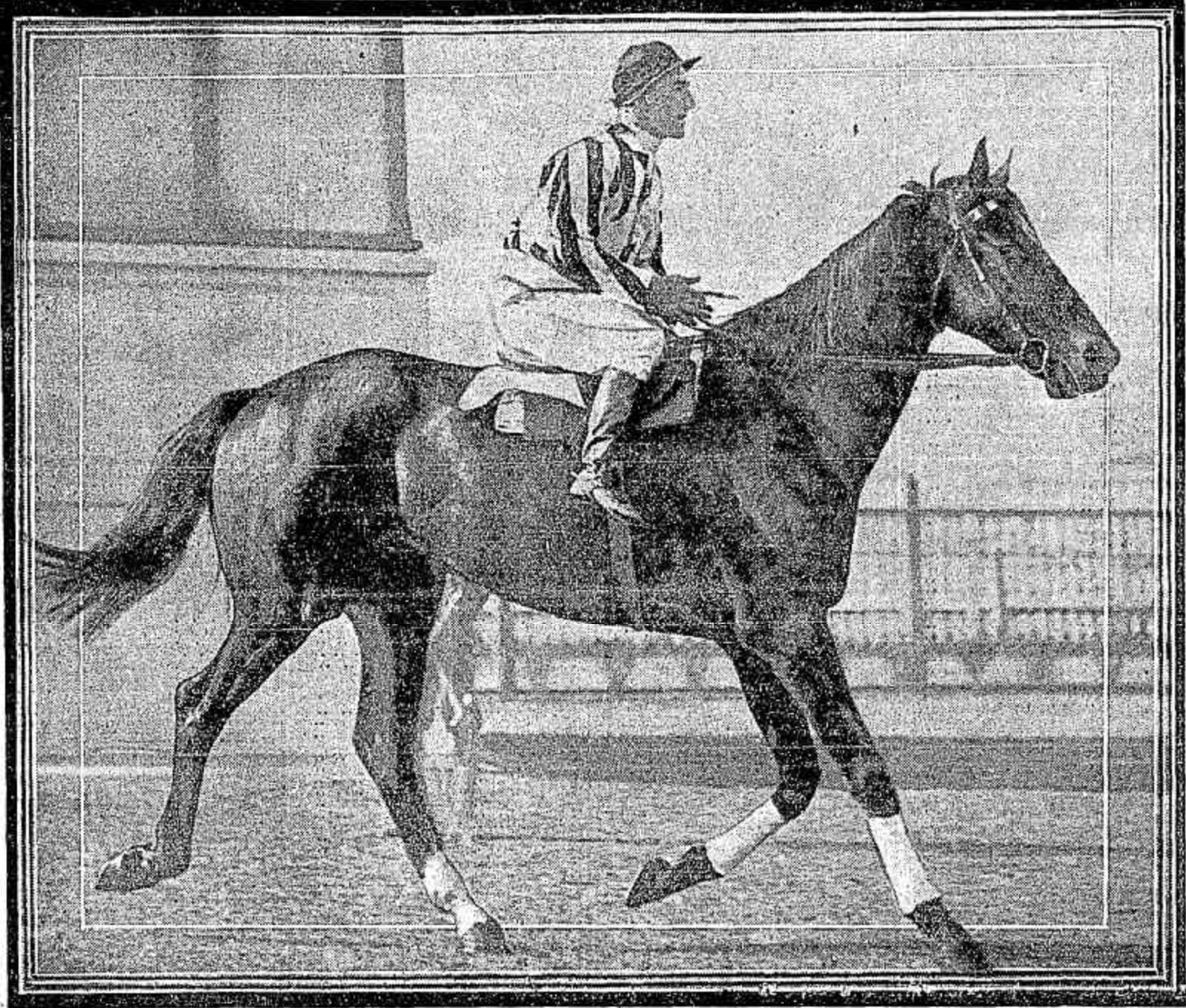
- Limerick, after winning the 1929 All Aged Stakes
- Sire: Limond (GB)
- Grandsire: Desmond (GB)
- Dam: Medley (NZ)
- Damsire: Varco (GB)
- Sex: Gelding
- Foaled: 1923
- Country: New Zealand
- Colour: Brown or black
- Breeder: Harry Knight
- Owner: Harry Knight
- Trainer: F.D. Jones
- Record: 59: 29, 12, 2
- Earnings: £38,729

Major wins
- Chelmsford Stakes (1926, 1927, 1928); Warwick Stakes (1927,1928,1929); Rawson Stakes (1927,1928); AJC Spring Stakes (1927, 1928); Craven Plate (1927); AJC St Leger (1927); AJC Cumberland Stakes (1927); Hill Stakes (1927,1928); AJC Plate (1927); AJC Kings Cup (1928); Chipping Norton Stakes (1928); All Aged Stakes (1928); AJC Autumn Stakes (1928,1929)

Limerick was a brown or black New Zealand Thoroughbred gelding who raced in Australia. He raced from a two-year-old to a seven-year-old, recording 29 wins from 6 furlongs to 2¼ miles, with regular jockey Maurice McCarten winning 22 races. McCarten migrated from New Zealand in 1923, a renowned master of race tactics, and won many major races.

== Breeding ==
Limerick was by Limond (NZ), sire of the winners of nine Derbys in Australia and New Zealand, as well as the winners of 25 Southern Hemisphere classics and leading sire in New Zealand 1930–31. His dam, Medley (NZ), also produced the classic winner Ballymena.

Breeder and owner Harry Knight was originally a large wheat grower owning one of the largest farming properties at Racecourse Hill, Canterbury, New Zealand, before turning his attention to thoroughbreds.

== Racing career ==
Limerick raced between 1925 and 1931 an unsound horse on occasions raced for six seasons winning 13 major races in succession between 1927 and 1928, including rare triple wins in the Chelmsford Stakes and Warwick Stakes and also won the coveted 1928 AJC Kings Cup at Randwick, defeating Valparaiso and Winalot. Limerick throughout his career defeated rival champions Windbag, Amounis, Mollison and Gothic. His racing colours were black and white stripes, white sash, red cap.

Trainer Fred Jones was from New Zealand.

Limericks's racing record consisted of 59 starts, with 29 wins, 12 seconds, 2 thirds and 16 unplaced runs.

In 2025 Limerick was inducted into the New Zealand Racing Hall of Fame.

== Image gallery ==
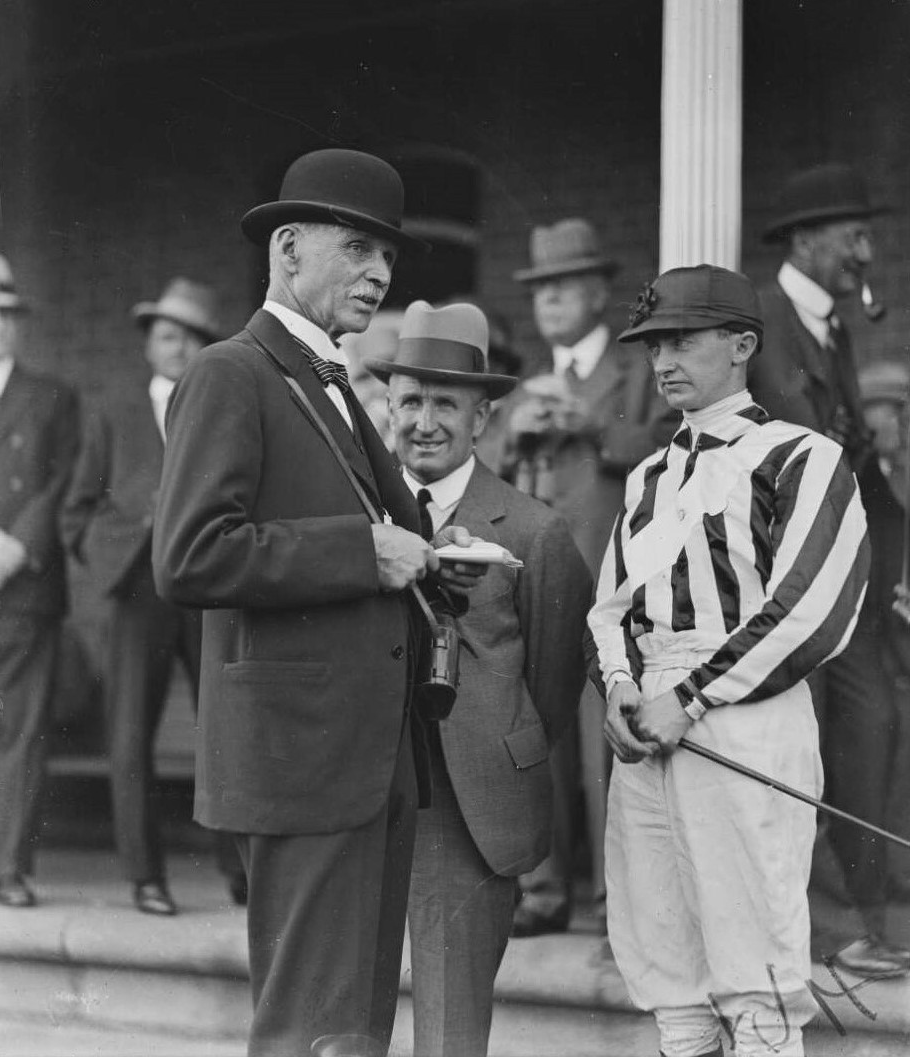
Harry Knight (left), Fred Jones (middle) & Roy Reed

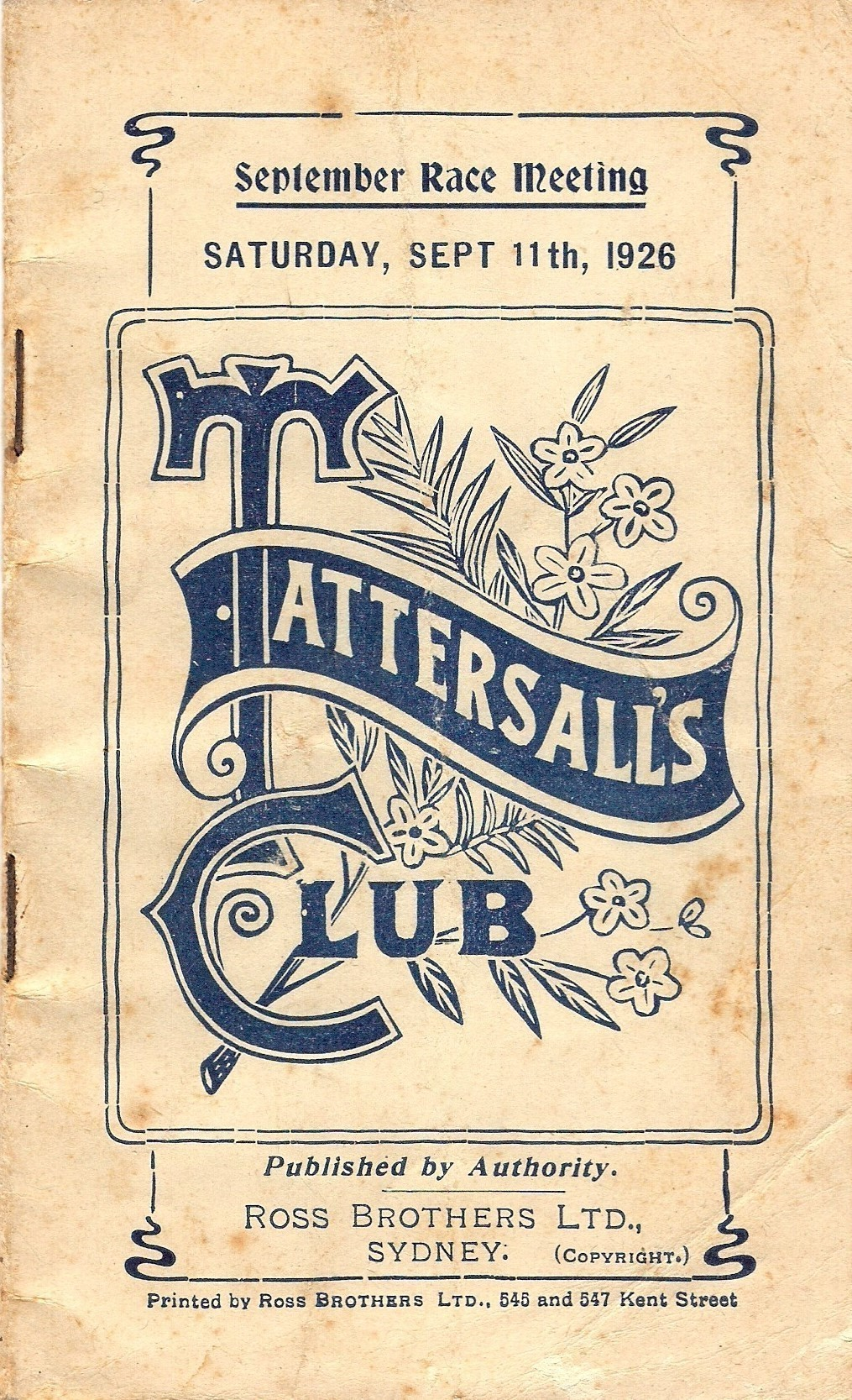
1926 Tatts Chelmsford Stakes racebook front cover

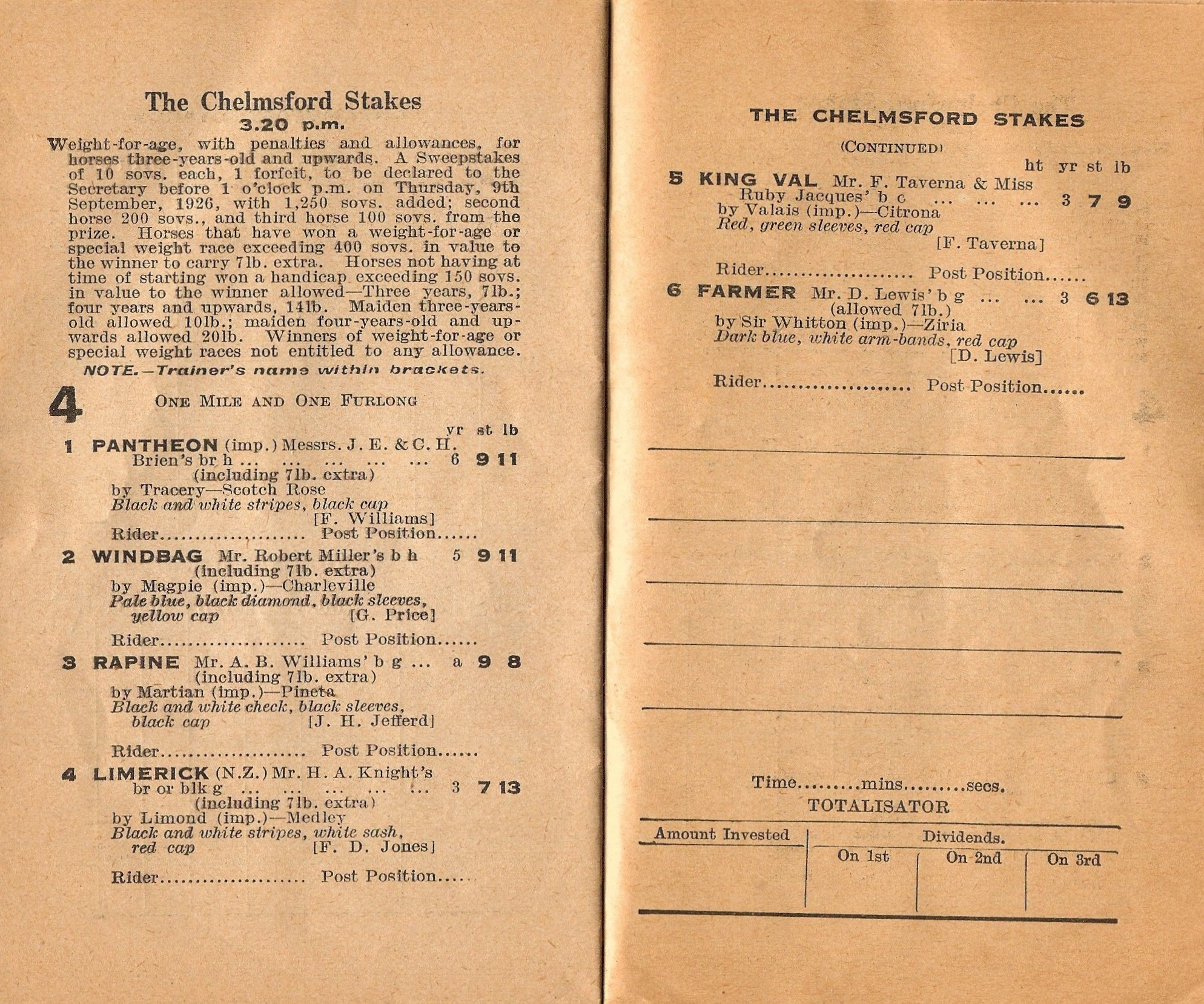
1926 Tatts Chelmsford Stakes page showing the winner, Limerick
