= Callander-Presnell =

Callander-Presnell, registered as the Stan Fox Stakes
- Class: Group 3
- Location: Randwick Racecourse, Sydney, Australia
- Inaugurated: 1975
- Race type: Thoroughbred - flat
- Sponsor: Myplates (2026)

Race information
- Distance: 1,600 metres
- Surface: Turf
- Track: Right-handed
- Qualification: Three year old
- Weight: Set weights Colts and geldings 56½ kg Fillies 54½ kg
- Purse: A$1,000,000 (2026)

The Callander-Presnell, registered as the Stan Fox Stakes is an Australian Turf Club Group 3 Thoroughbred horse race for three-year-olds at set weights, over a distance of 1,600 metres. It is held annually at Randwick Racecourse, Sydney, Australia in October.

== History ==
The race was named for the New South Wales industrialist and racehorse owner-breeder Stan Fox, who died in 1974.

In 2022 the race name was changed to the Callander-Presnell in recognition of Sydney racing journalists Ken Callander and Max Presnell.

=== Grade ===
- 1975–1984 - Principal race
- 1985–1988 - Listed race
- 1989–1995 - Group 3
- 1996–2025 - Group 2
- 2026 onwards - Group 3

=== Distance ===
- 1978–2010 – 1400 metres
- 2011–2021 - 1500 metres
- 2022 onwards - 1600 metres

=== Venue ===
- 1975–2003 - Randwick Racecourse
- 2004 - Warwick Farm Racecourse
- 2005–2010 onwards - Randwick Racecourse
- 2011–2018 - Rosehill Racecourse
- 2019 - Randwick Racecourse

== Winners ==
The following are past winners of the race.

- 2026 - Central Europe
- 2025 - Ohope
- 2024 - Prost
- 2023 - Chrysaor
- 2022 - Golden Mile
- 2021 - Hilal
- 2020 - Peltzer
- 2019 - Colada
- 2018 - Tarka
- 2017 - Gold Standard
- 2016 - Impending
- 2015 - Press Statement
- 2014 - Shooting To Win
- 2013 - Eurozone
- 2012 - Kabayan
- 2011 - Manawanui
- 2010 - Decision Time
- 2009 - Denman
- 2008 - Dreamscape
- 2007 - †race not held
- 2006 - Court Command
- 2005 - Paratroopers
- 2004 - Wager
- 2003 - Ambulance
- 2002 - Rare Insight
- 2001 - Lonhro
- 2000 - Dynamic Love
- 1999 - Pins
- 1998 - Kenwood Melody
- 1997 - General Nediym
- 1996 - West Point
- 1995 - Octagonal
- 1994 - Marwina
- 1993 - Campaign Warrior
- 1992 - Ghost Story
- 1991 - Greig
- 1990 - Sir Patrick
- 1989 - Show County
- 1988 - From The Planet
- 1987 - High Regard
- 1986 - Top Avenger
- 1985 - Crossroads
- 1984 - Burraboolee
- 1983 - All Chant
- 1982 - Wild Rice
- 1981 - Note Of Victory
- 1980 - Integrity
- 1979 - Pink Posy
- 1978 - Acamar
- 1977 - Big Treat
- 1976 - Gentle James
- 1975 - Hydahban

† Not held because of outbreak of equine influenza

== See also ==
- Craven Plate
- Spring Champion Stakes
- List of Australian Group races
- Group races
