= Chatham (horse) =

Australian-bred Thoroughbred racehorse

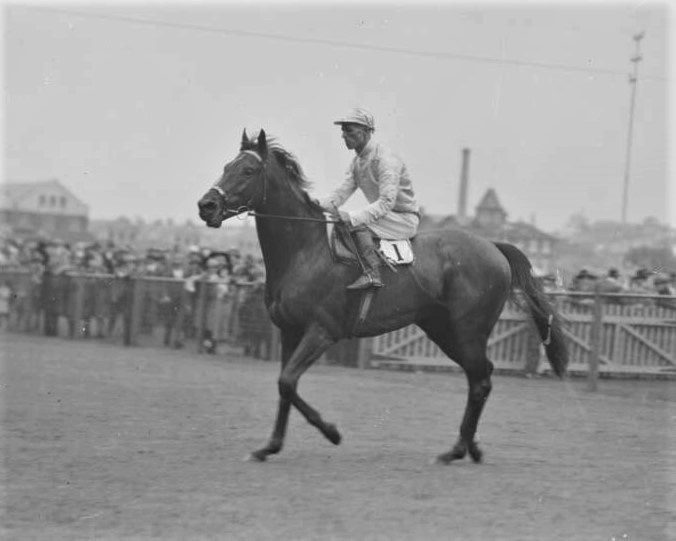
- Chatham and Jim Pike
- Sire: Windbag (AUS)
- Grandsire: Magpie
- Dam: Myosotis
- Damsire: The Welkin (GB)
- Sex: Stallion
- Foaled: 1928
- Country: Australia
- Colour: Bay
- Breeder: Kia Ora Stud, Scone
- Owner: E. A. Blair
- Trainer: 1. Ike Foulsham; 2. Fred Williams
- Record: 45: 23½-6½-1
- Earnings: £18,095 $36,490

Major wins
- Craven Plate (1931, 1933, 1934); Linlithgow Stakes (1931, 1932, 1933); W S Cox Plate (1932, 1934); Epsom Handicap (1932, 1933); Canterbury Stakes (1933); Caulfield Stakes (1933); Hill Stakes (1933, 1934); Warwick Stakes (1933, 1934); All Aged Stakes (1934); Doncaster Handicap (1934)

Honours
- Australian Racing Hall of Fame (2005); Chatham Stakes
- Last updated on 18 September 2010

Chatham (foaled 1928) was an outstanding Australian Thoroughbred racehorse that was bred by Percy Miller at the Kia Ora Stud near Scone, New South Wales.

== Pedigree ==
He was the best son of the 1925 Melbourne Cup winner Windbag. His dam Myosotis was a granddaughter of the 1899 English Triple Crown winner, Flying Fox. Myosotis was the dam of eight foals all of which raced and included four winners. Chatham's half-brother, Cetosis was the best of these four winners, having won 16 races in Perth and in the country. Chatham's fourth dam, Paqresseuse was a sister to the undefeated Grand Flaneur.

Chatham was sold at the 1930 Sydney yearling sales for 650 guineas to trainer, Ike Foulsham.

== Racing record ==
Chatham raced from 1931 to 1934, becoming one of the great milers to race in Australia who won 12 out of 21 times at that distance and often while carrying very high weights. In 1931 he ran second by two and a half lengths to Phar Lap in the prestigious Cox Plate then came back in the 1932 running to earn the first of his two Cox Plate wins. As well, Chatham won both the Linlithgow Stakes and the Craven Plate three times. He won three other races twice: the Epsom Handicap in 1932 and 1933, and both the Warwick and Hill Stakes in 1933 and 1934. He is also well known for his win in the 1934 Doncaster Handicap in which he carried a weight of 10 st 4 lb on a heavy track and won after missing the start. At the finish of his racing career he had won 21 stakes or Principal Races.

Chatham was one of the great runners in the inter-war period and in 2005 was inducted in the Australian Racing Hall of Fame.

== Stud record ==
Retired to stud in 1935 he stood initially in NSW. In later years he stood in South Australia where he was a leading sire. His last foal was born in 1950. Among Chatham's progeny, he was the sire of:

- Craigie (born 1940) - won Sydney Cup etc.
- Chatspa (born 1942) - Adelaide Cup, a three-time winner of the SAJC Birthday Cup
- Conservator (1943) SAJC South Australian Derby etc.
- High Rank (born 1936) - won the Stradbroke Handicap

Chatham sired 16 stakeswinners with 36 stakeswins for over £210,000 in prizemoney.

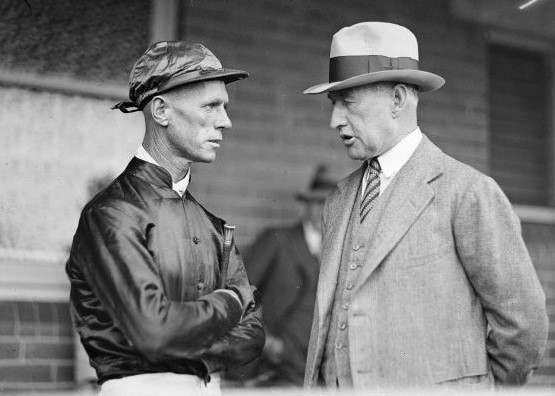
Jim Pike and Fred Williams

== 1934 racebook ==
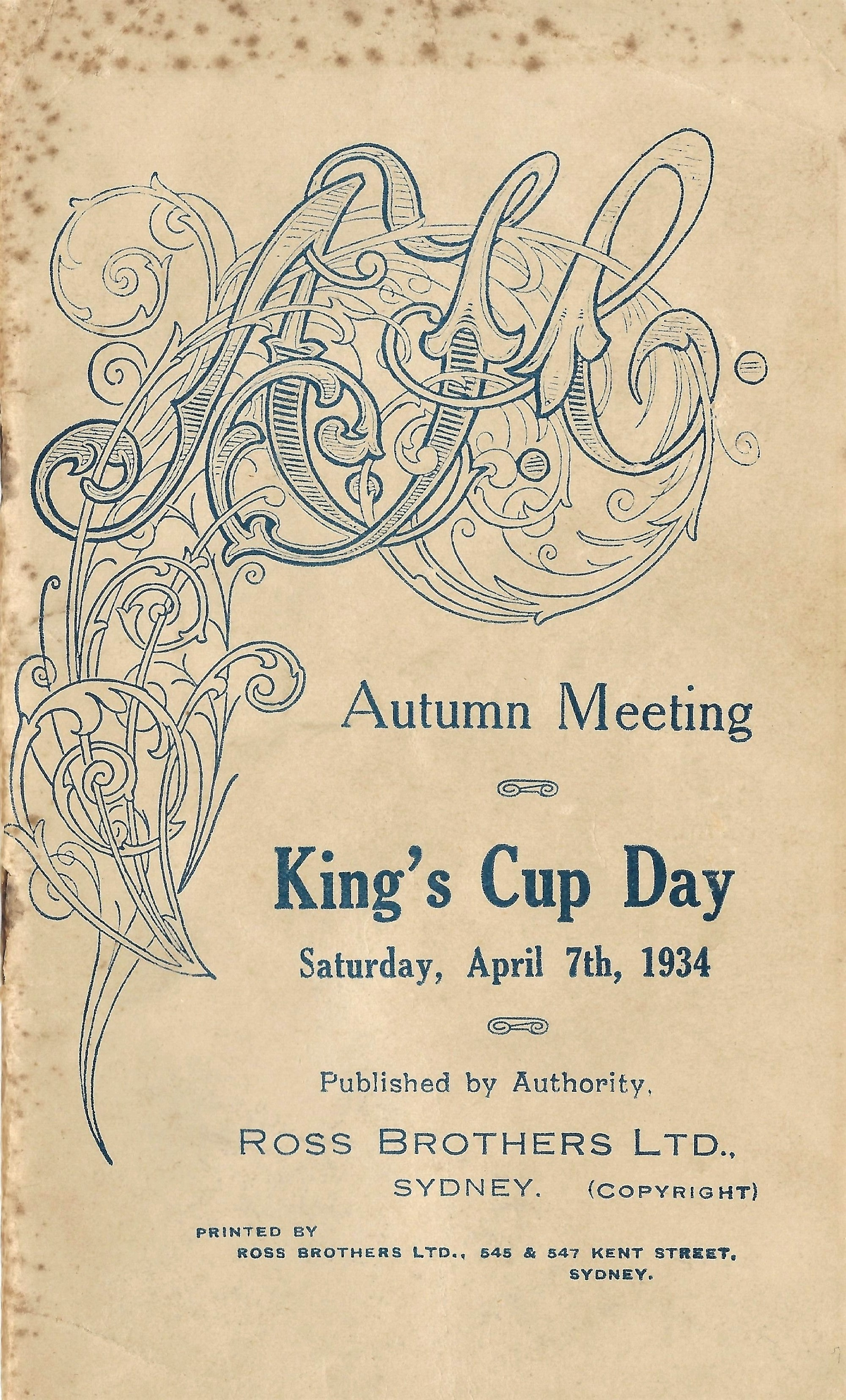
1934 AJC Kings Cup racebook front cover

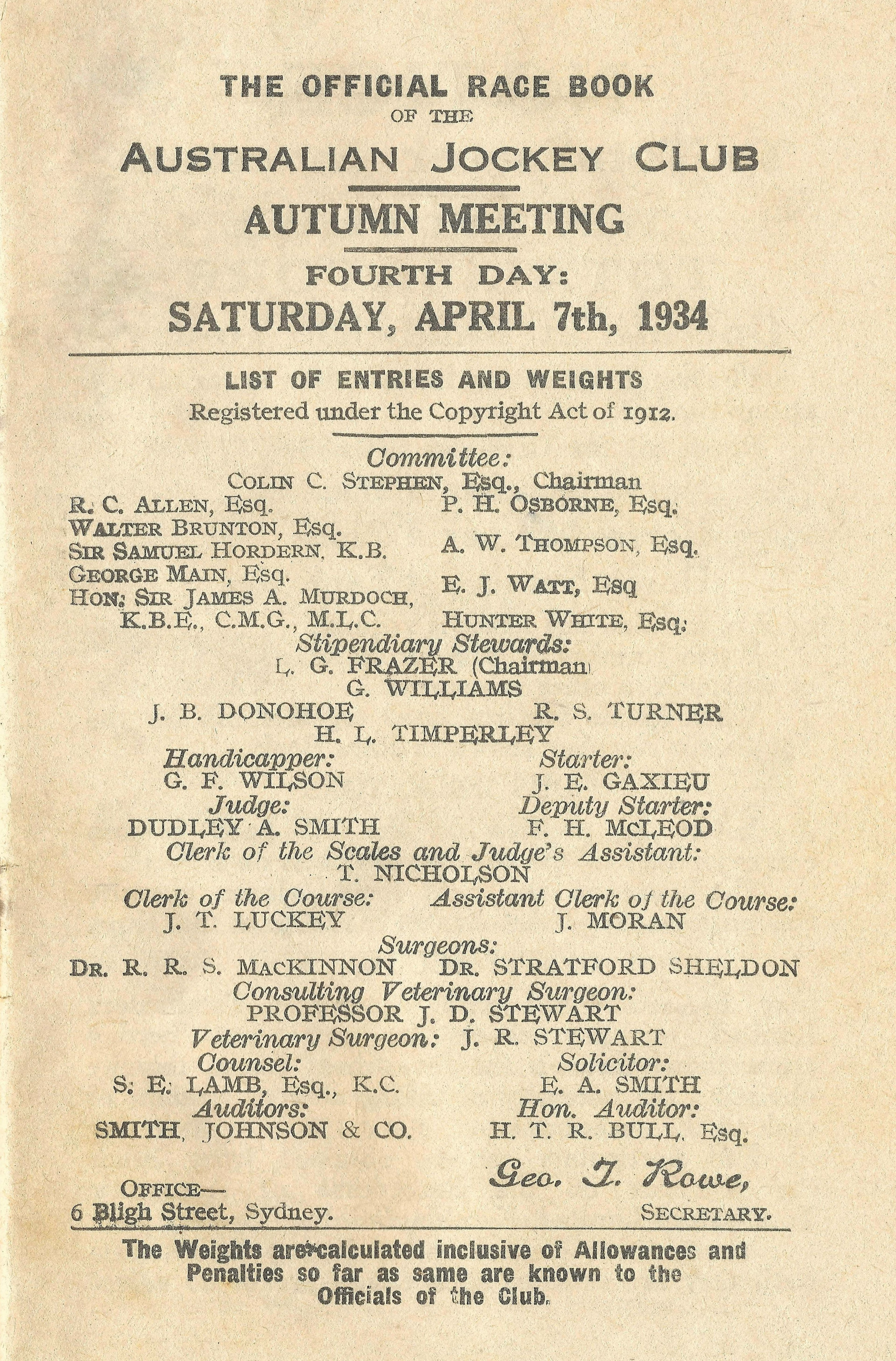
1934 AJC Kings Cup racebook page showing raceday officials

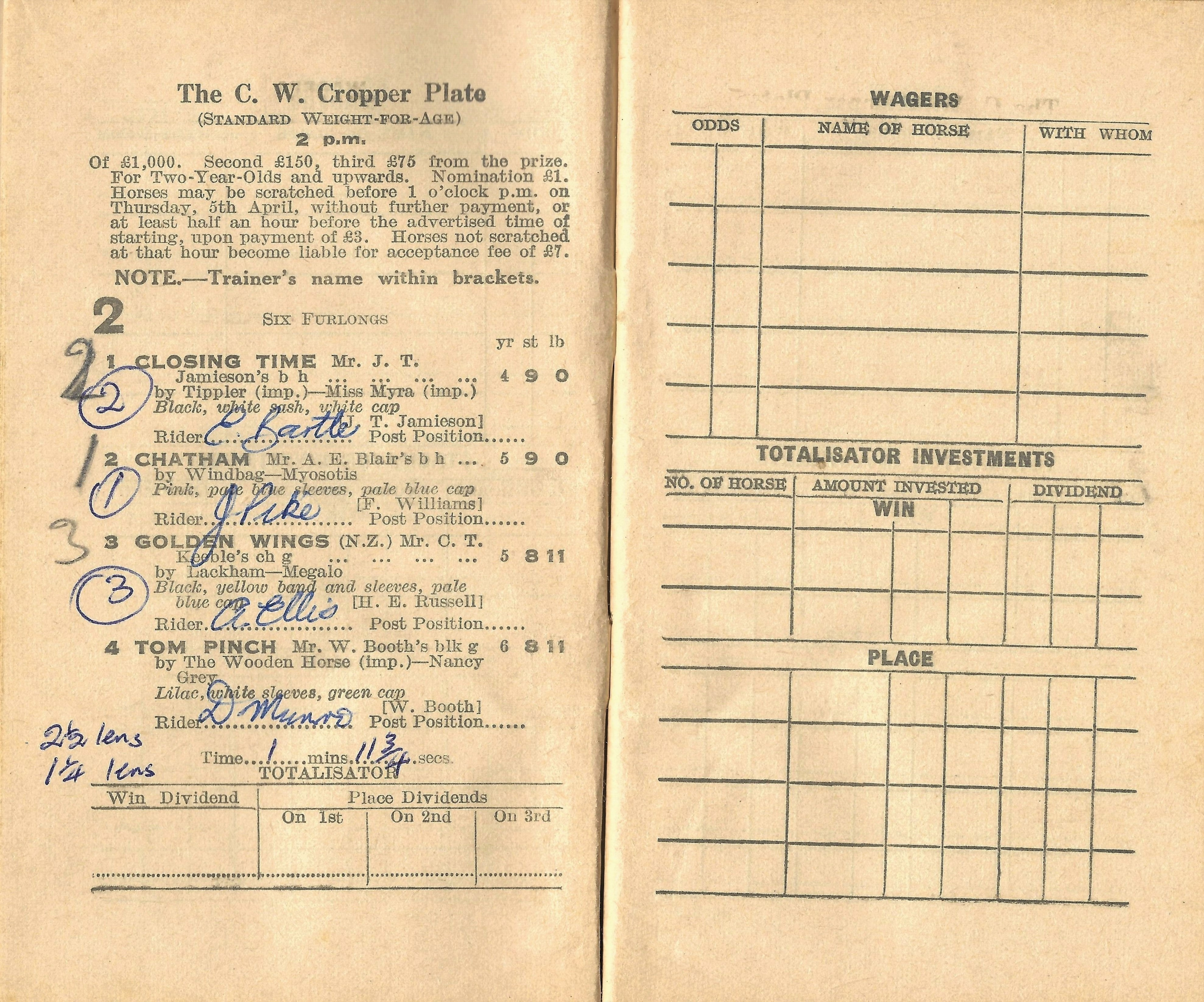
1934 AJC C.W. Cropper Handicap page showing the winner, Chatham

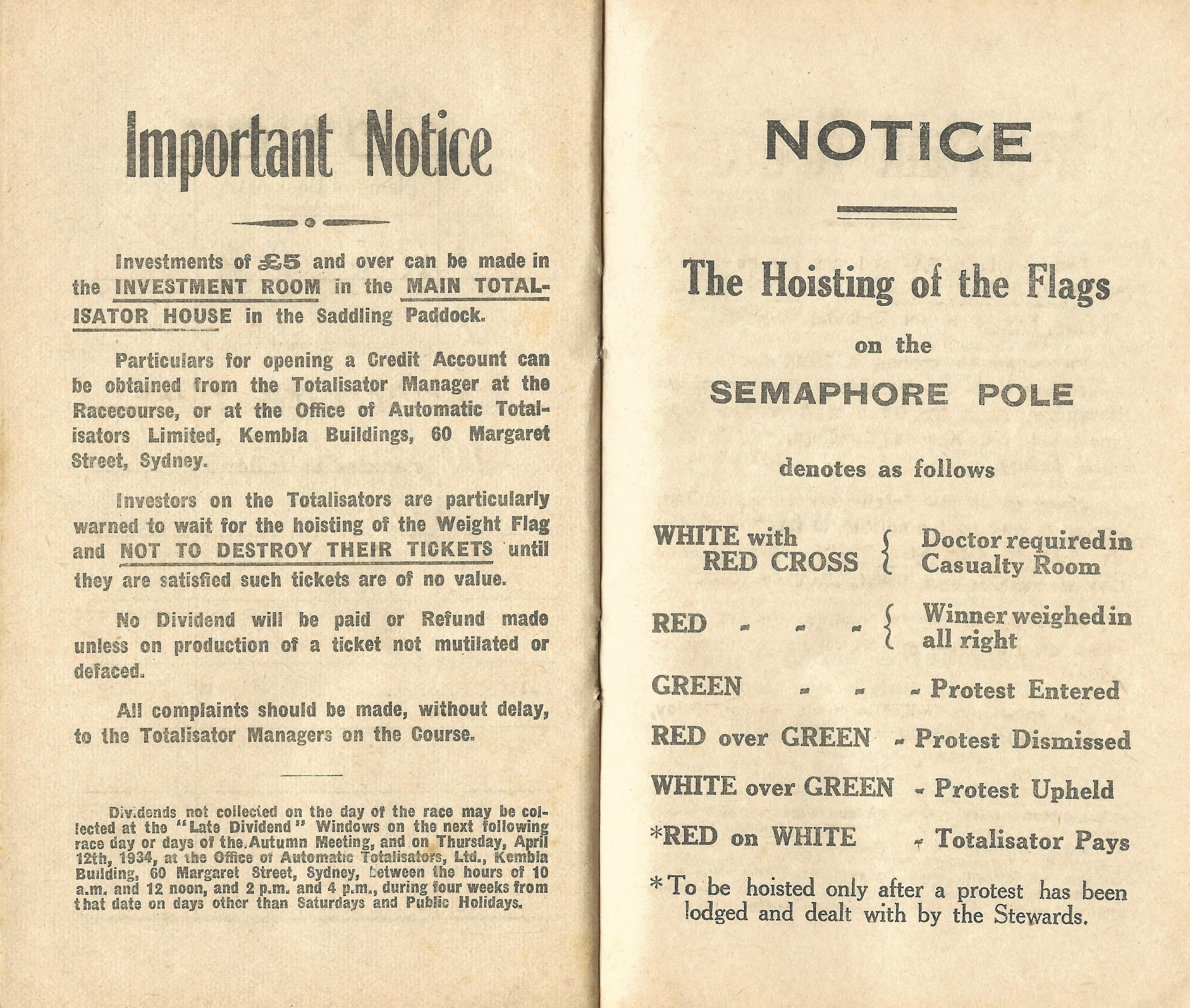
1934 AJC C.W. Cropper Handicap page showing semaphore flags

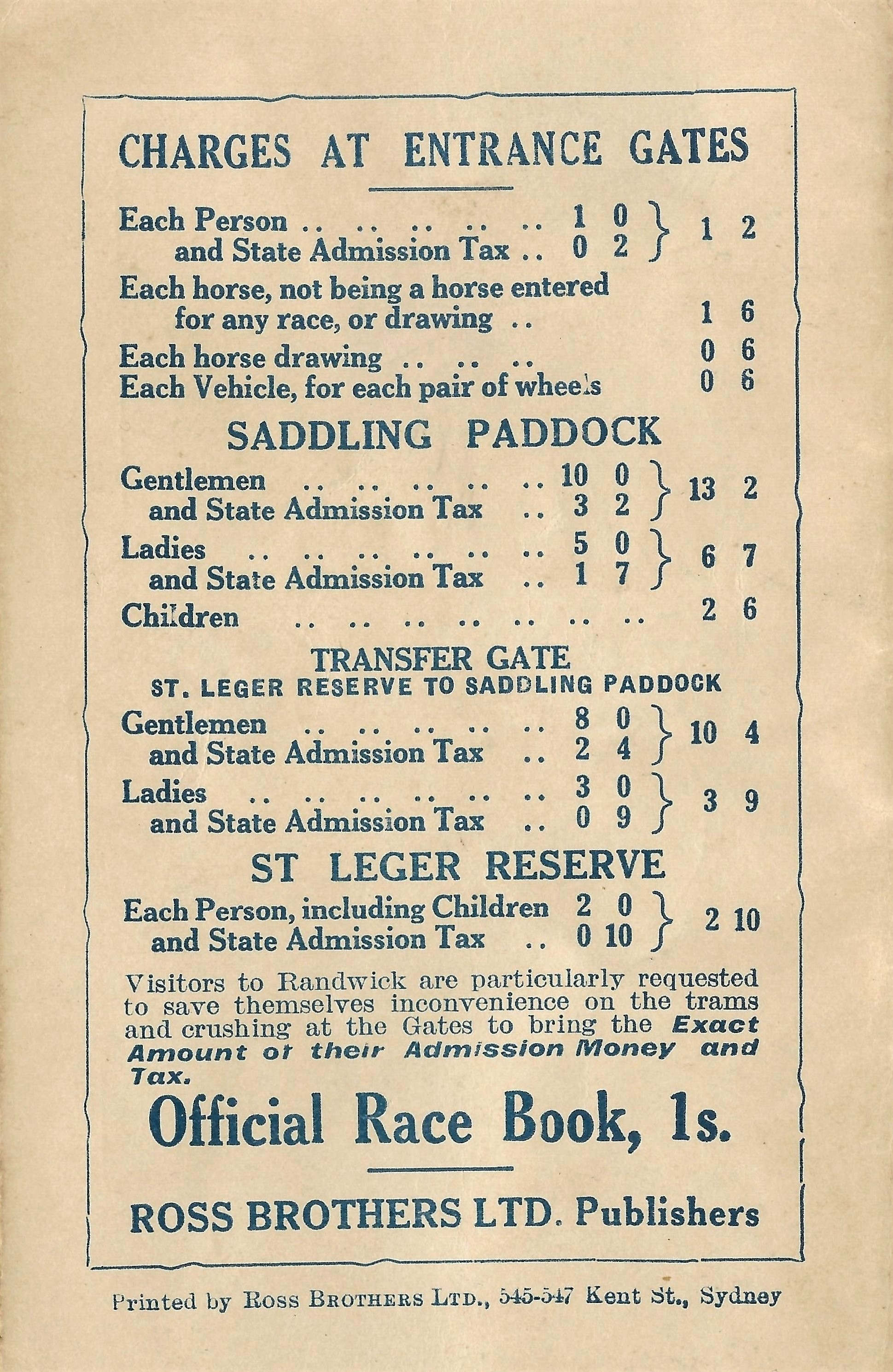
Back cover showing charges at the entrance gates

== See also ==
- Repeat winners of horse races
