= Craven Plate =

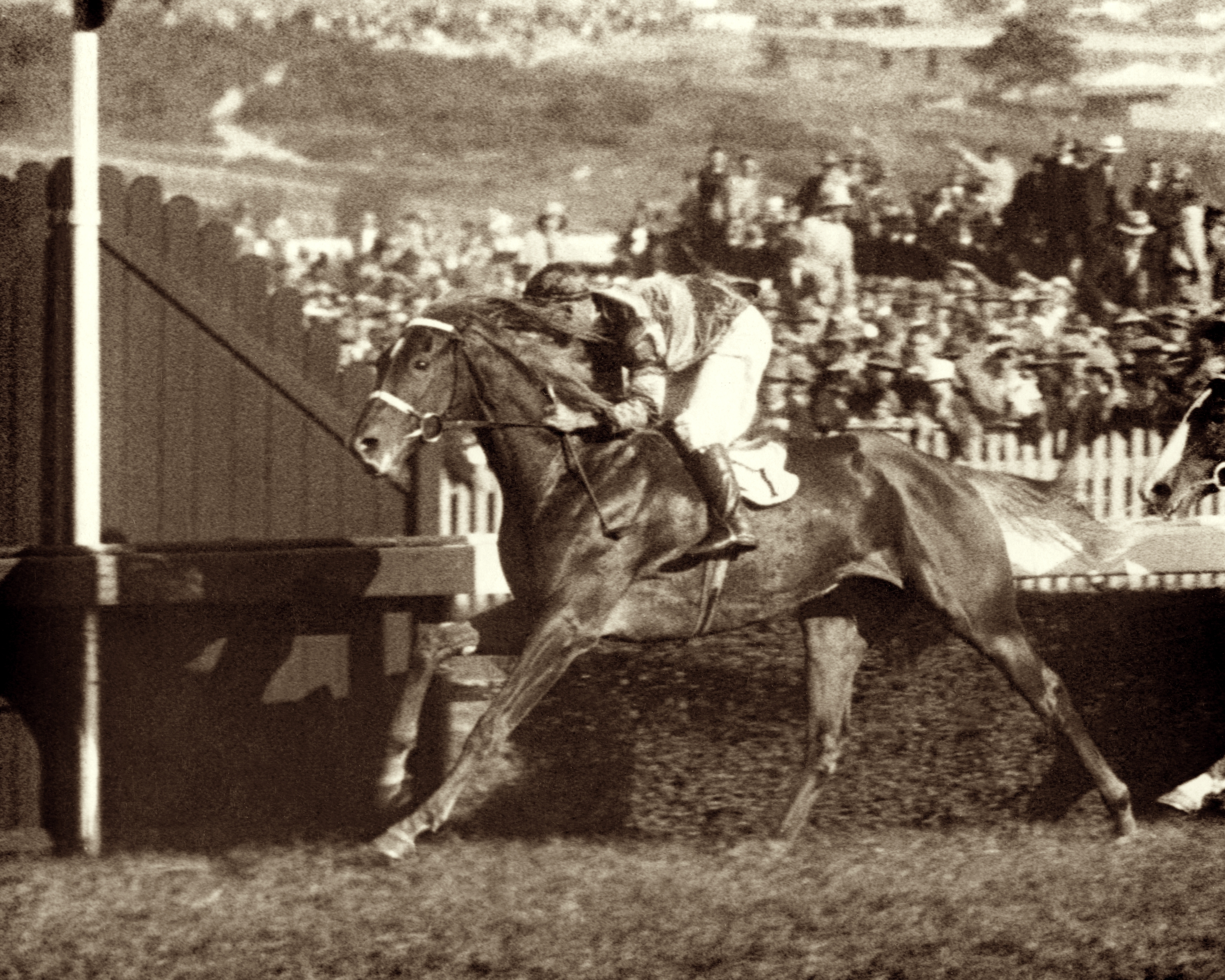
- Peter Pan, 1935 winner Jim Pike up
- Class: Group 2
- Location: Randwick Racecourse, Sydney, Australia
- Inaugurated: 1867
- Race type: Thoroughbred - flat
- Sponsor: Asahi Super Dry

Race information
- Distance: 1,800 metres
- Surface: Turf
- Track: Right-handed
- Qualification: Three years old and older
- Weight: Weight for Age
- Purse: A$750,000 (2026)

The Craven Plate is an Australian Turf Club Group 2 Thoroughbred horse race run over 1,800 metres, under Weight for Age conditions for three-year-olds and older, at Randwick Racecourse, Sydney, Australia.

== History ==
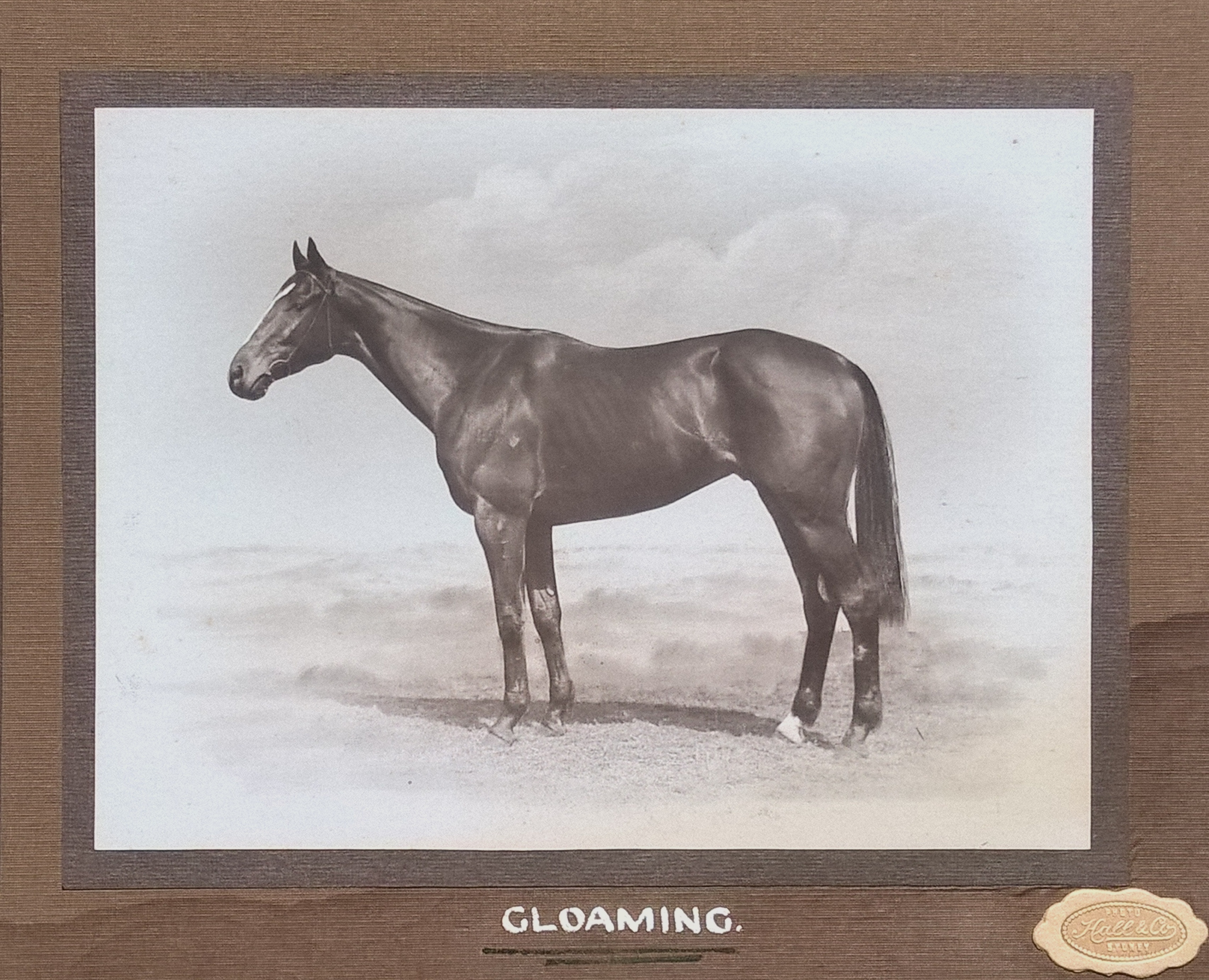
Gloaming, 1919, 1922, 1924 winner

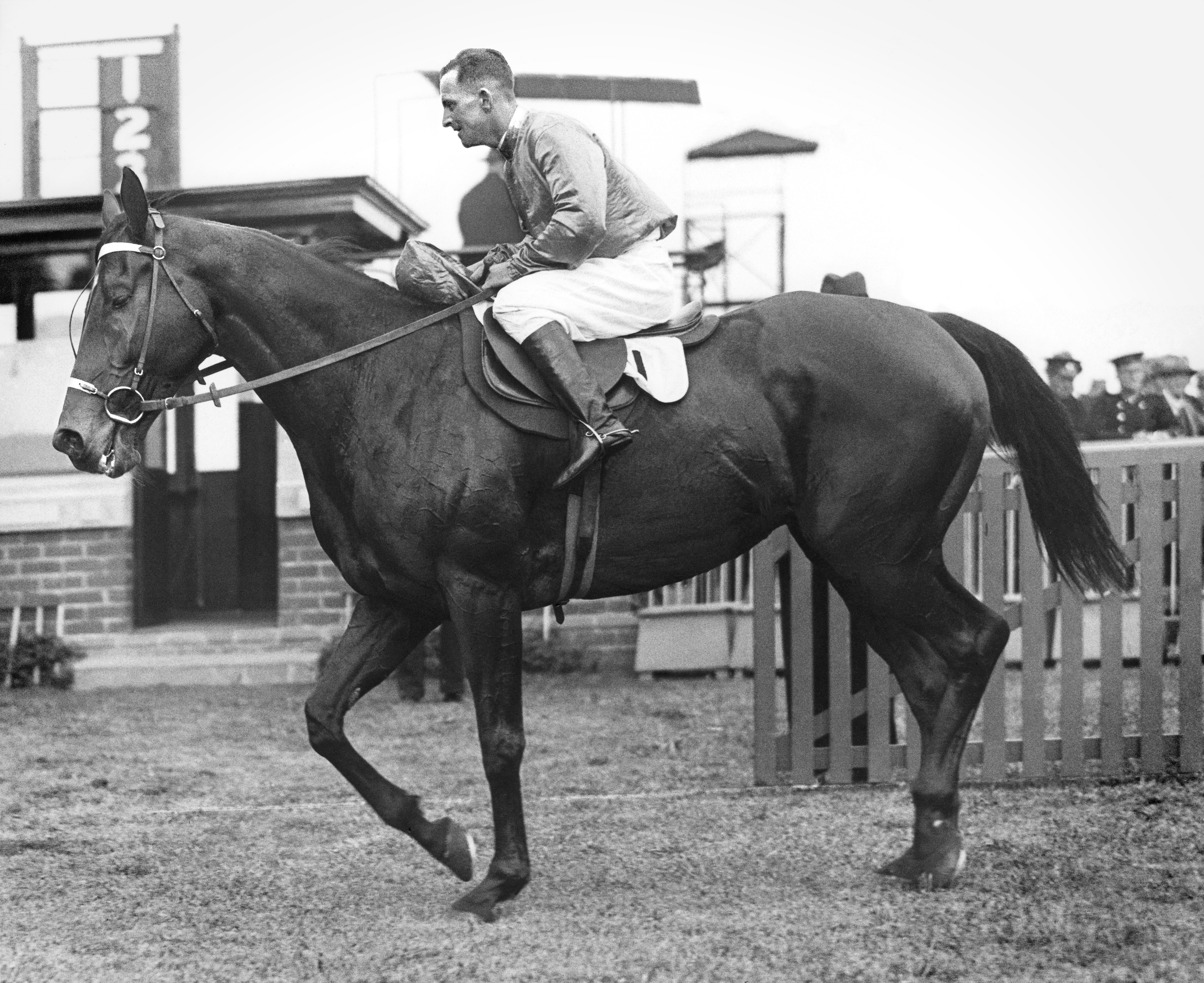
Amounis, 1928 winner

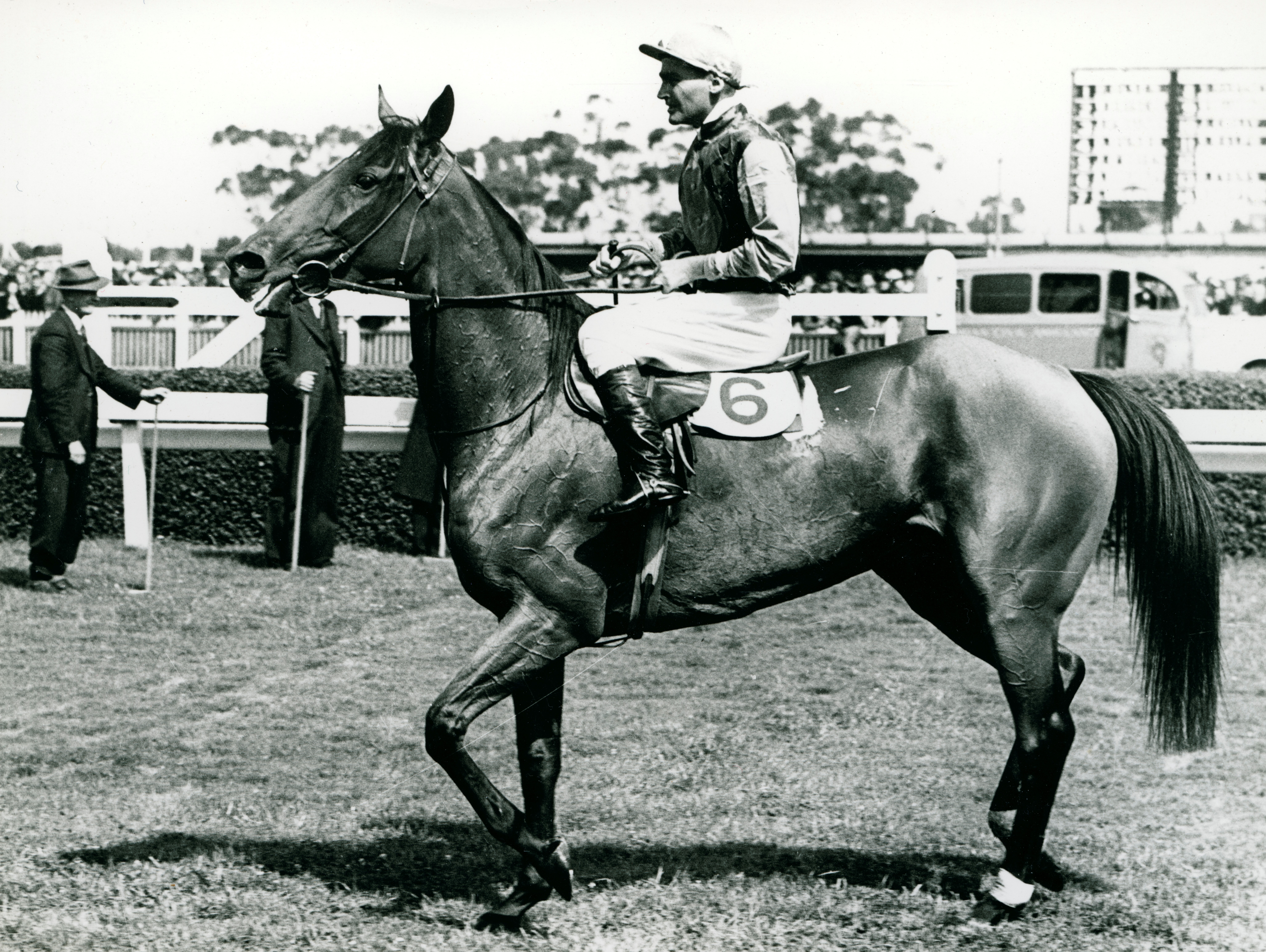
Flight, 1945 winner

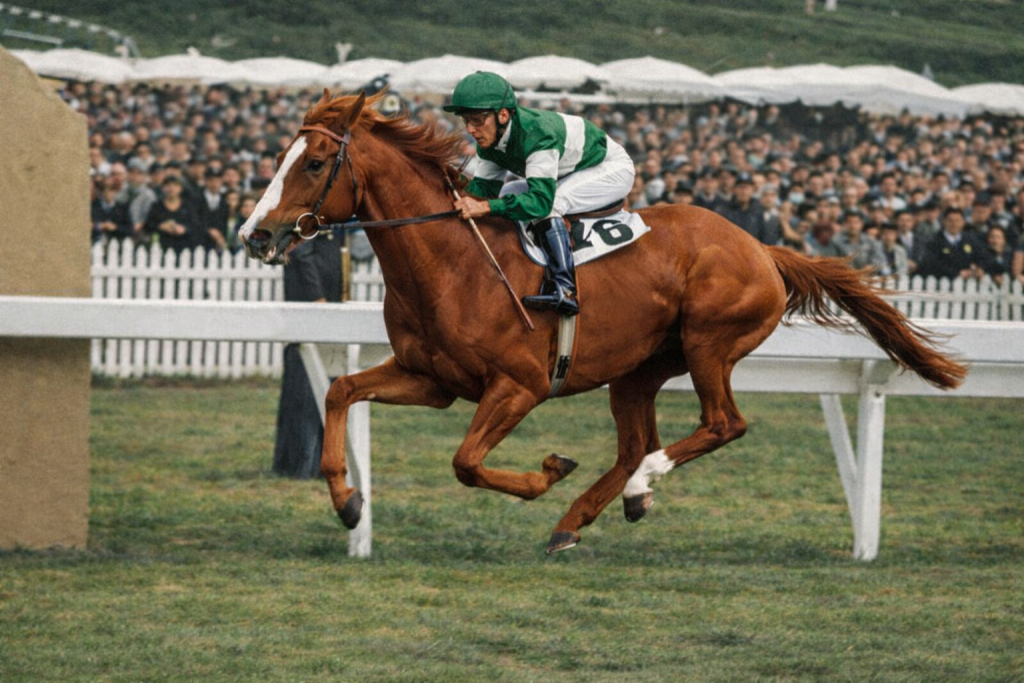
Carbon Copy, 1949 winner

The race has long been part of the AJC Spring Carnival and, in the late 19th and early 20th centuries, was considered one of the premier events. Its history includes a number of notable winners, including The Barb, Phar Lap, Peter Pan, Tim Whiffler, Carbine, Chatham, Windbag, Tulloch, Duke Foote, Prince Darius and Summer Fair.

Lindermann, trained by Chris Waller, won the race three times in succession in 2024 to 2026.

=== Name ===
- 1867–1999 - Craven Plate
- 2000 - Queen's Cup
- 2001 - Japan Trophy Race
- 2002 onwards - Craven Plate

=== Grade ===
- 1867–1978 - Principal Race
- 1979–1983 - race was not held
- 1984–1992 - Listed race
- 1993–2025 - Group 3
- 2026 onwards - Group 2

=== Distance ===
- 1867–1971 - 1 1/4 miles (~ 2000 metres)
- 1972–2000 – 2000 metres
- 2001 – 1800 metres
- 2002–2021 - 2000 metres
- 2022 onwards - 1800 metres

=== 1922,1939 and 1955 racebooks ===
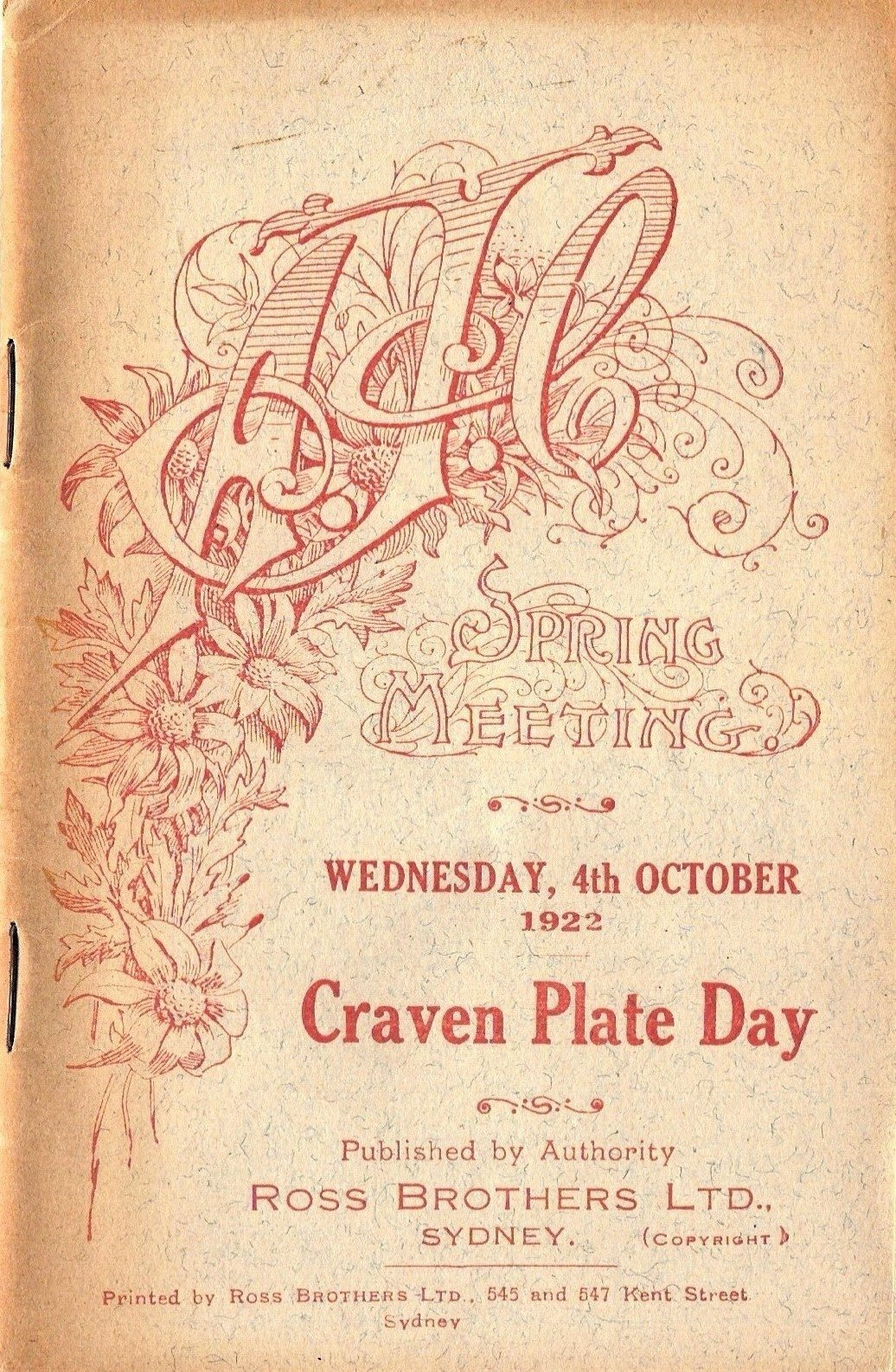
1922 AJC Craven Plate racebook front cover

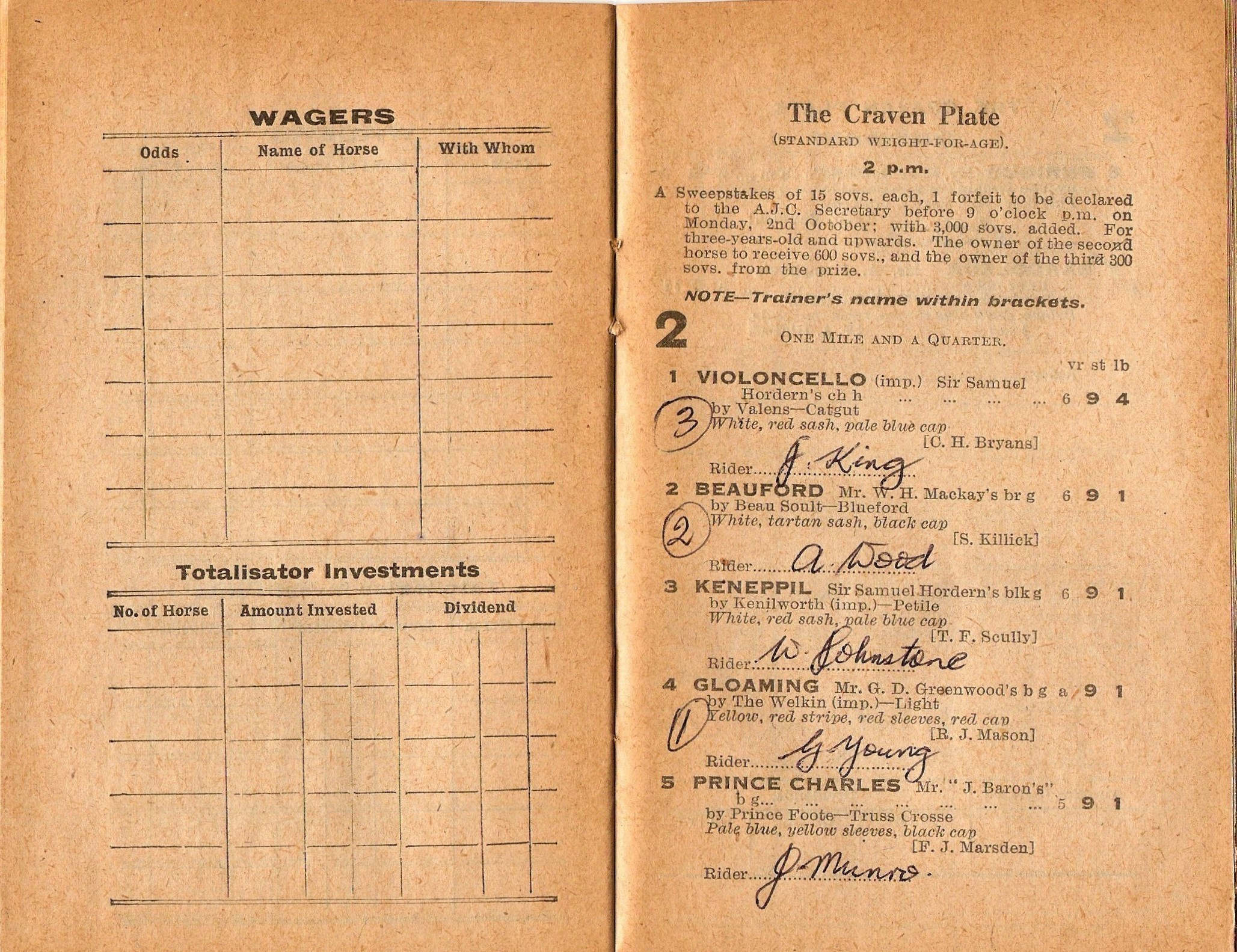
1922 AJC Craven Plate showing the winner, Gloaming

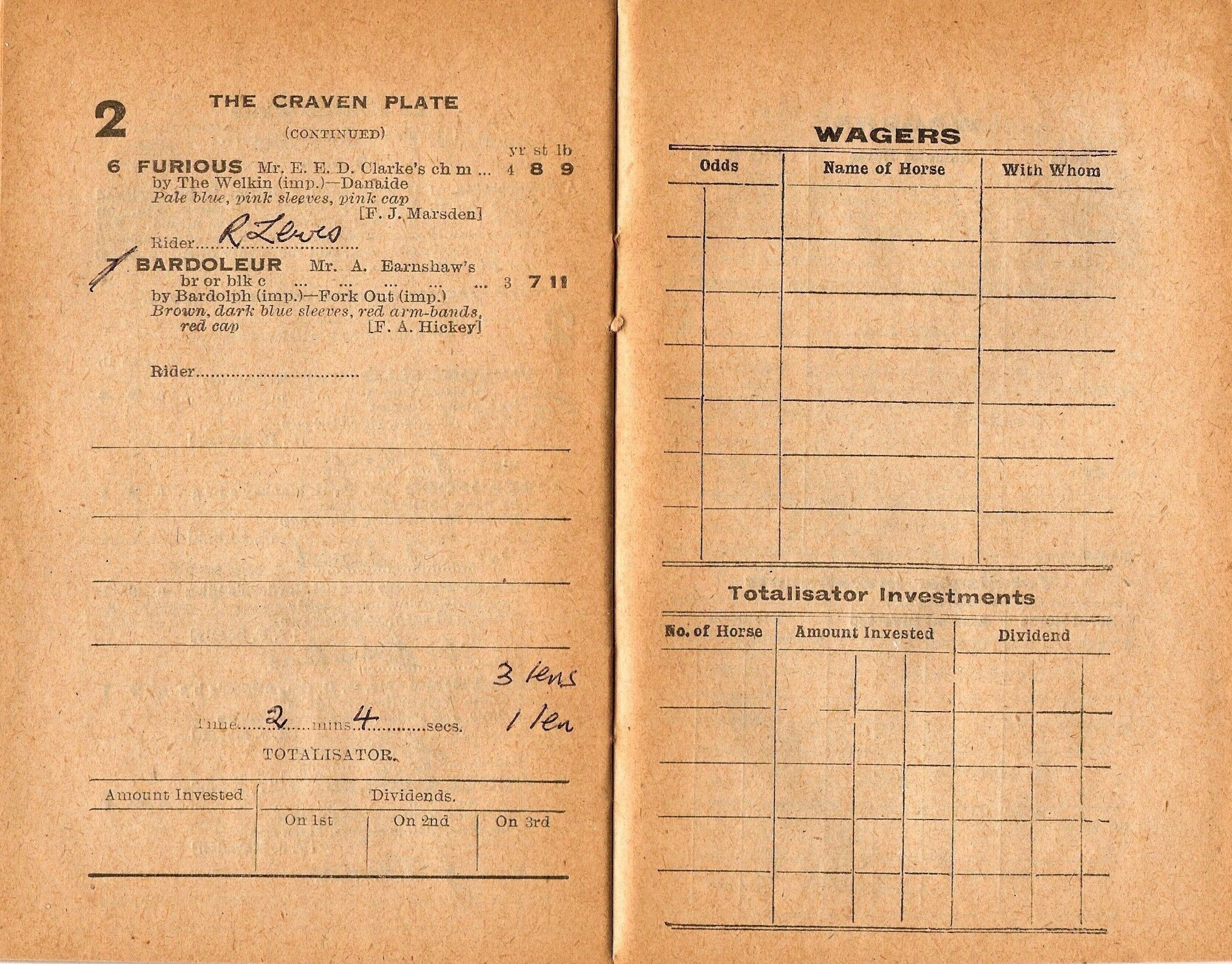
1922 AJC Craven Plate starters and results

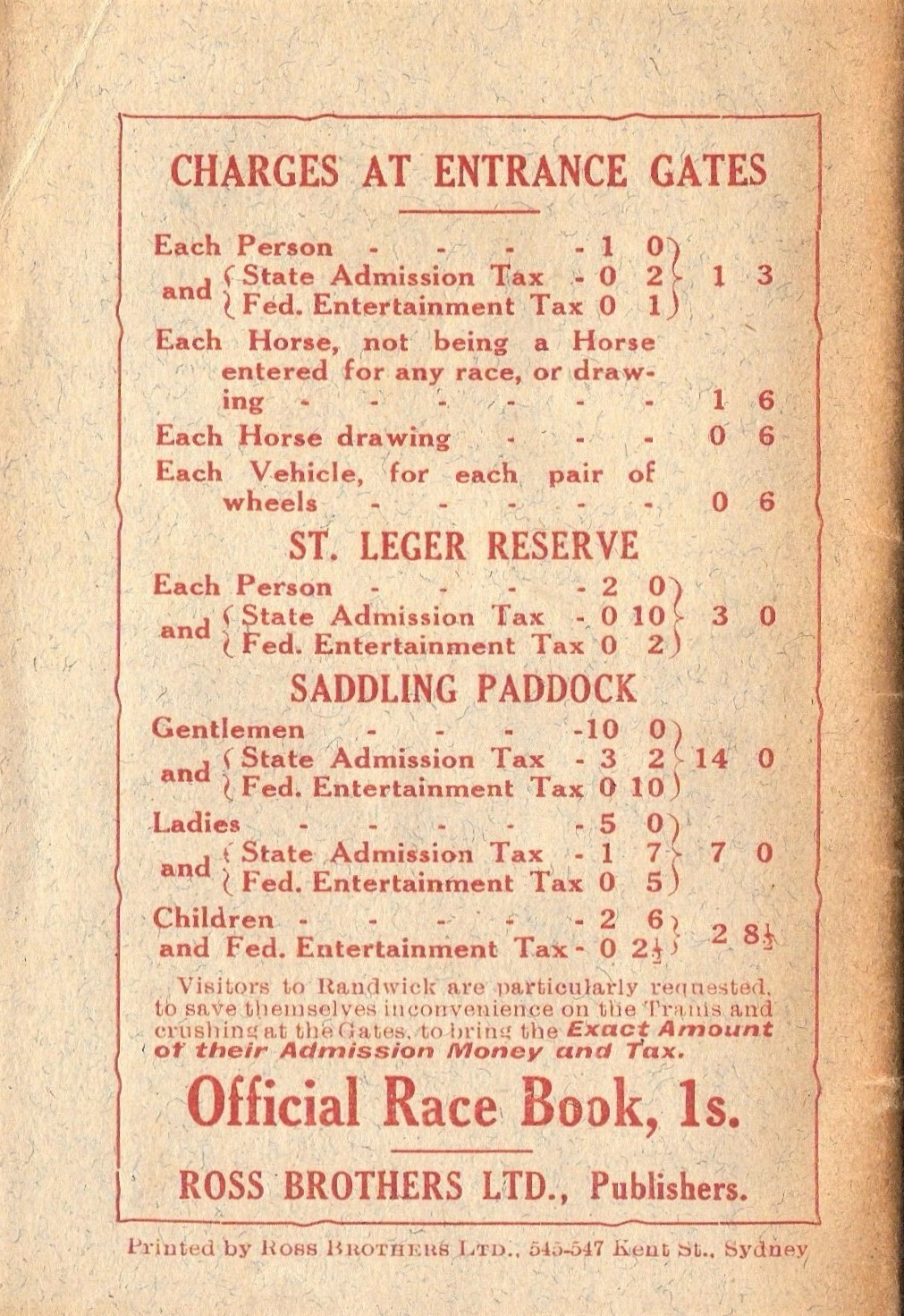
Back cover showing charges at the entrance gates

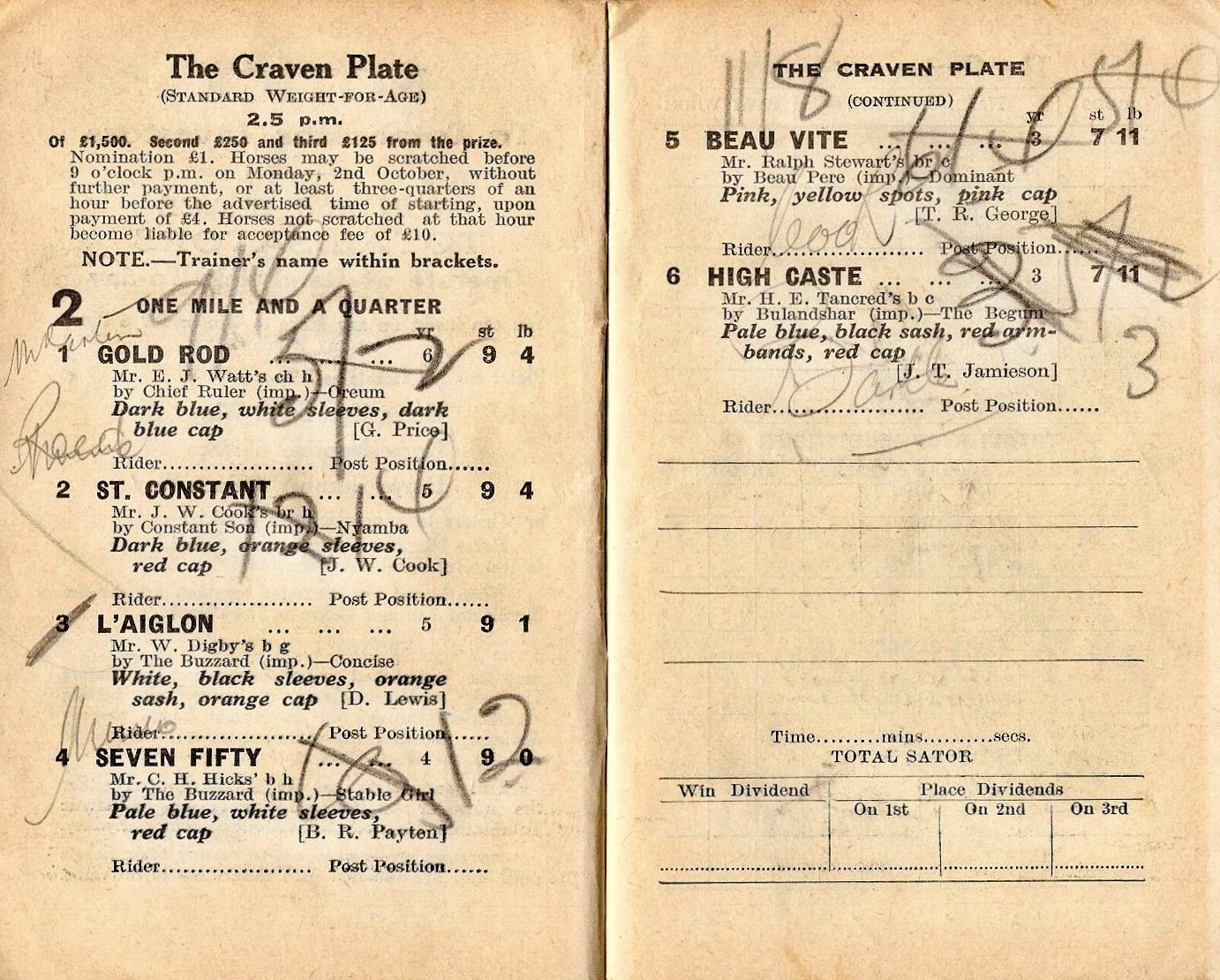
1939 Craven Plate racebook showing the winner, High Caste

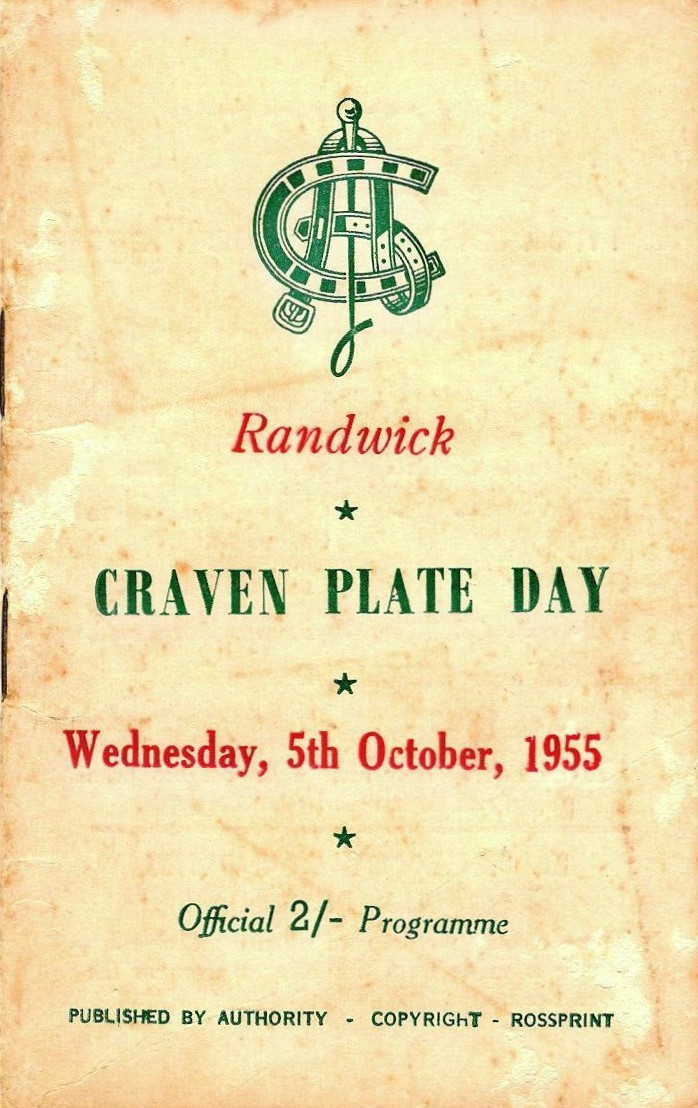
1955 AJC Craven Plate racebook front cover

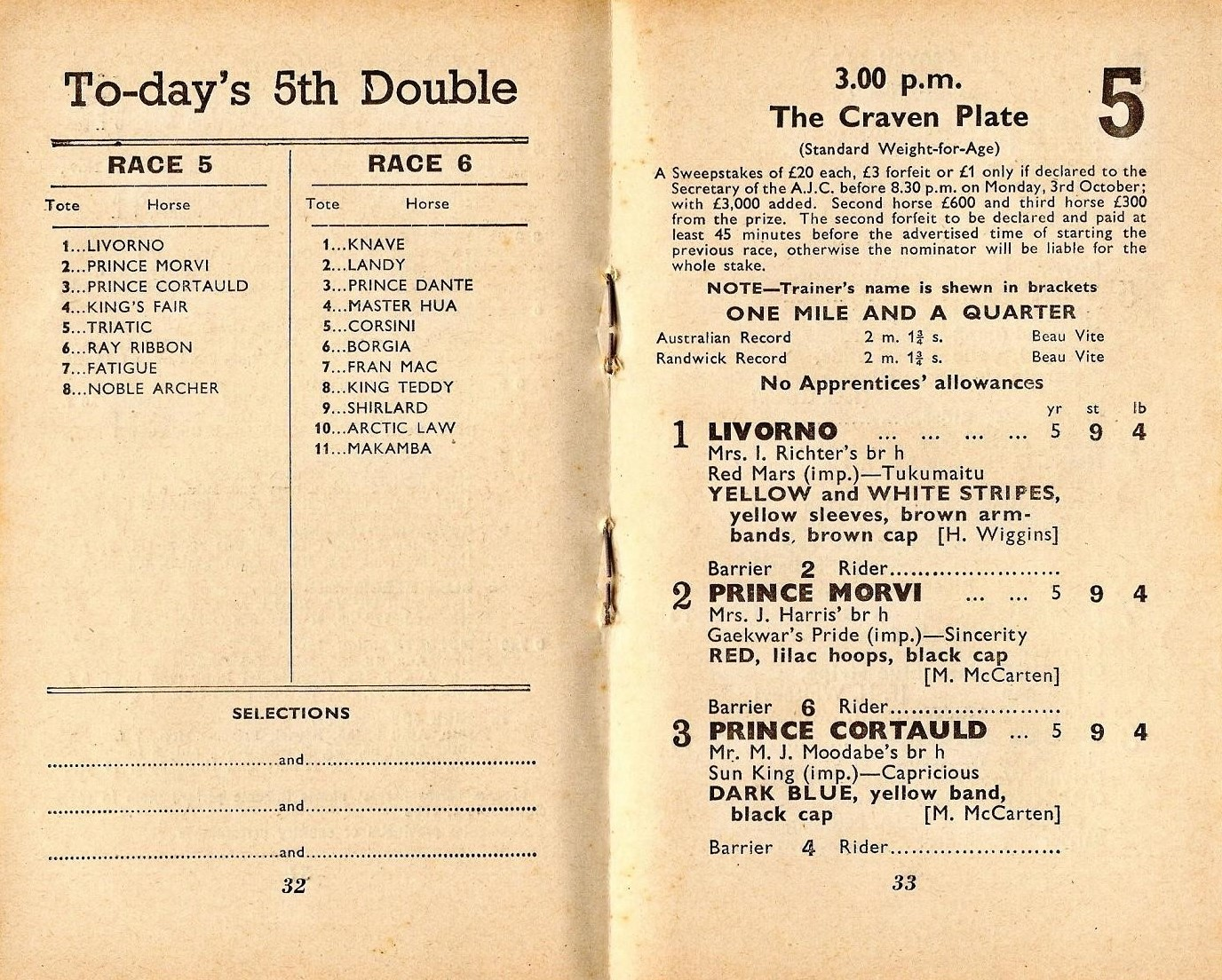
1955 AJC Craven Plate showing the winner, Prince Cortauld

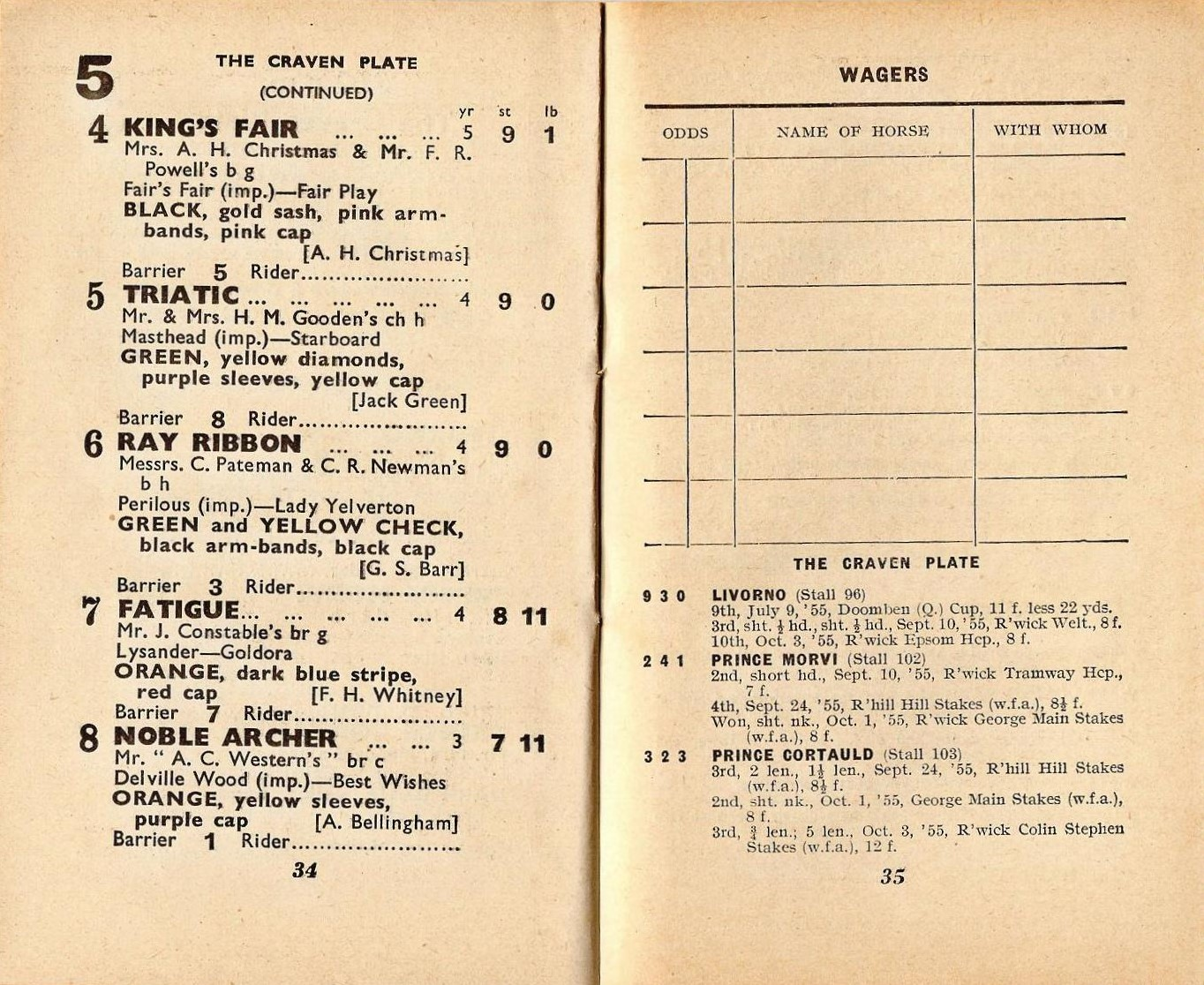
1955 AJC Craven Plate starters and results

=== Gallery of noted winners ===
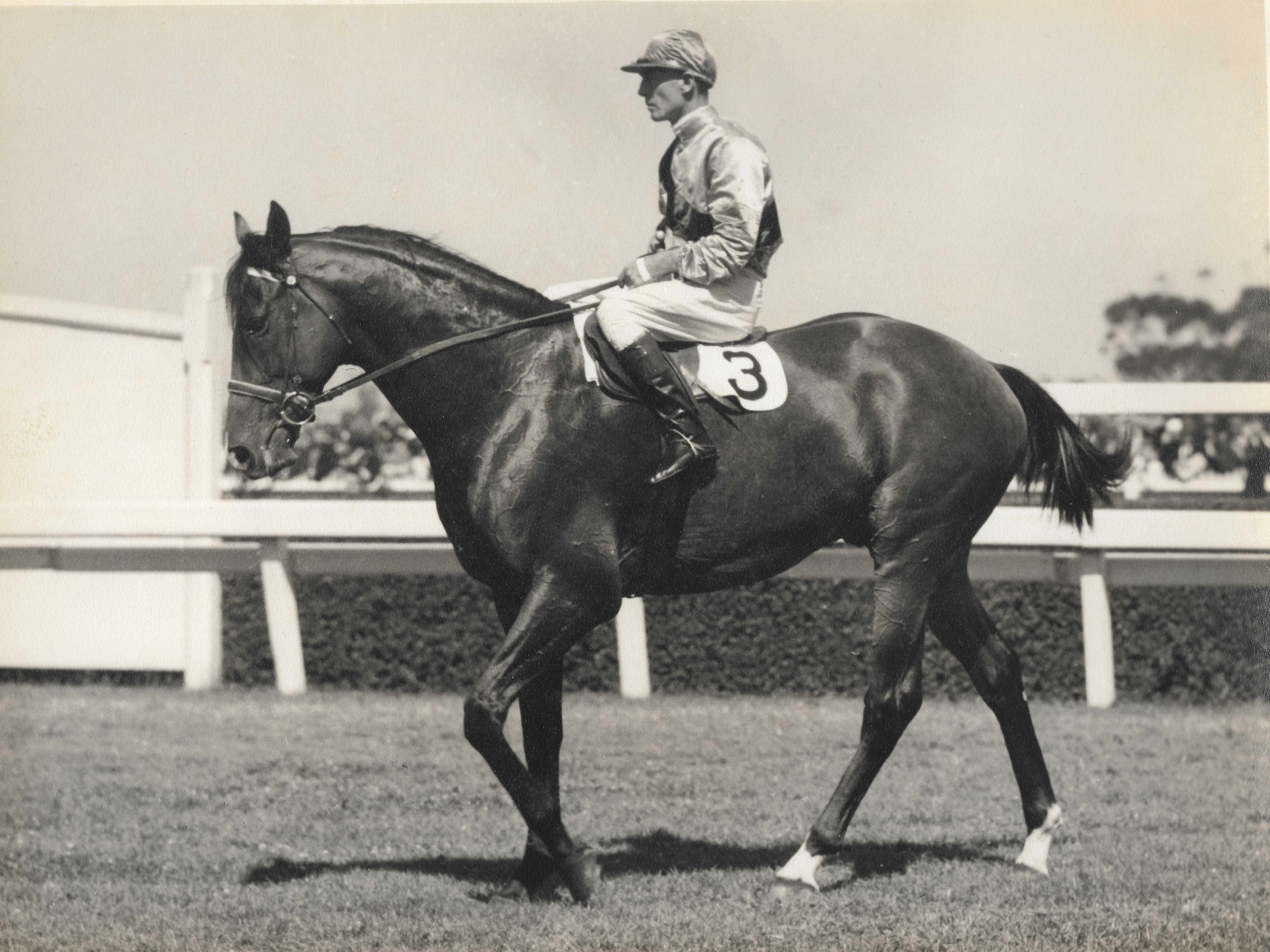
High Caste, 1939, winner

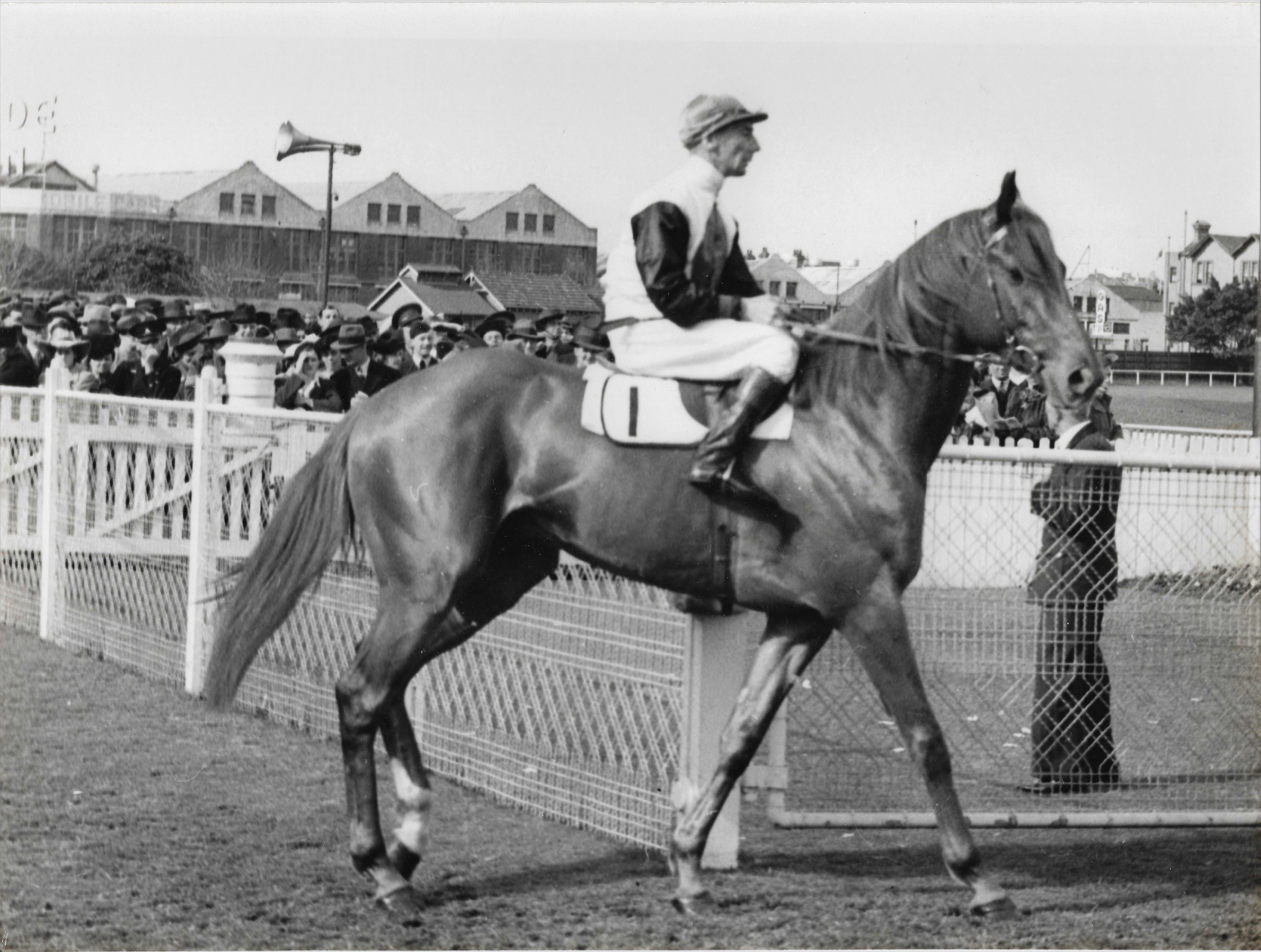
Yaralla, 1942 winner

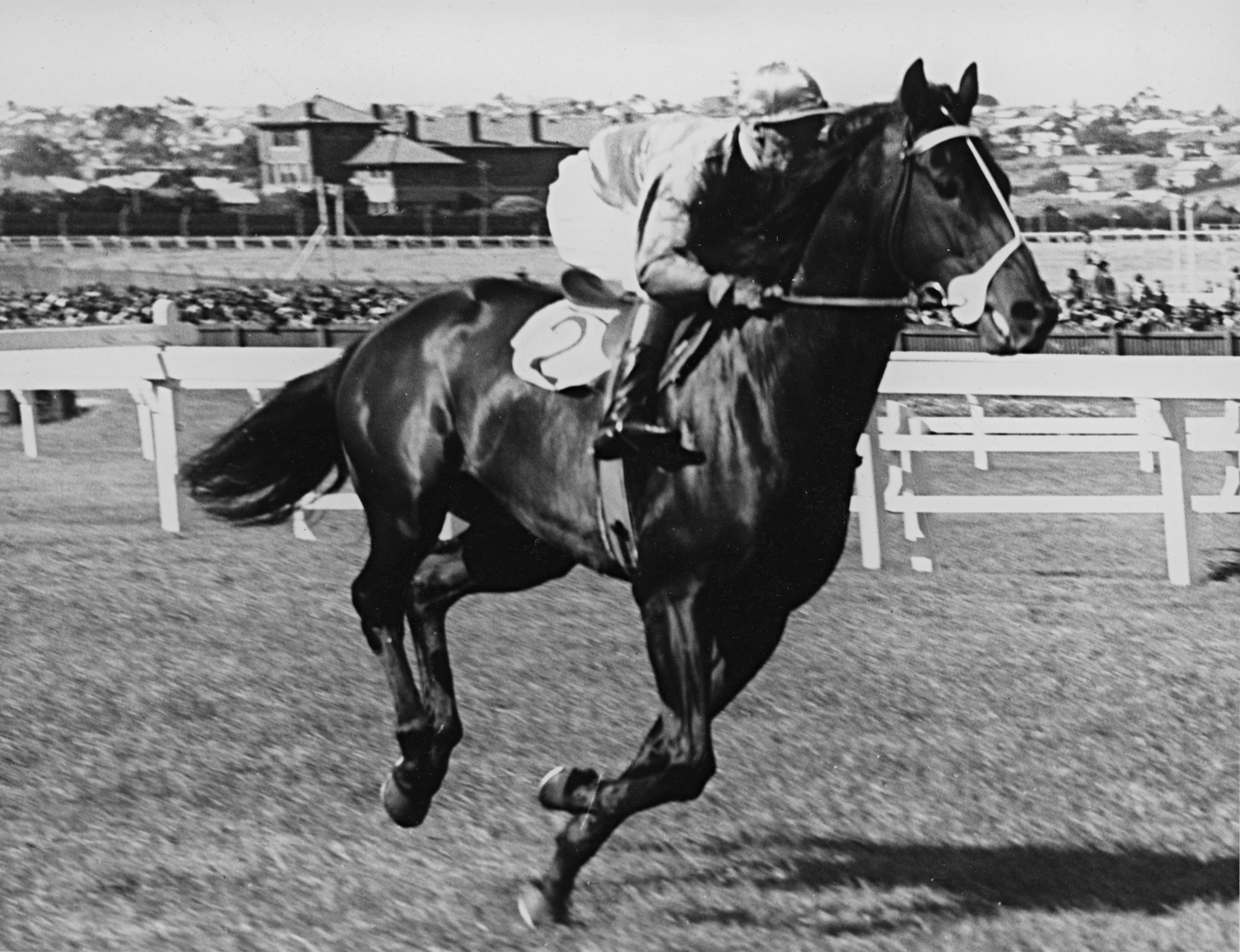
Beau Vite, 1940 & 1941 winner

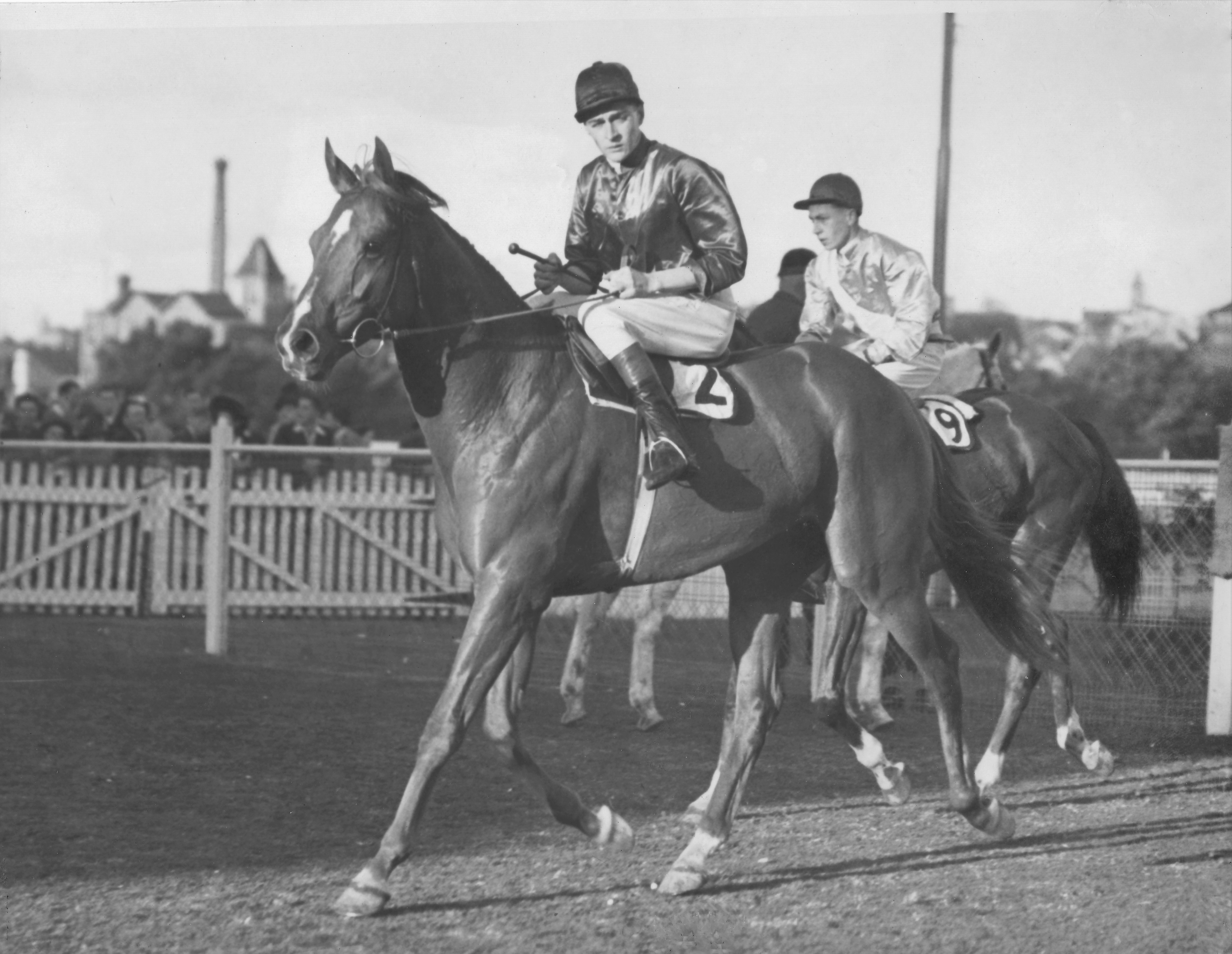
Russia, 1947 winner

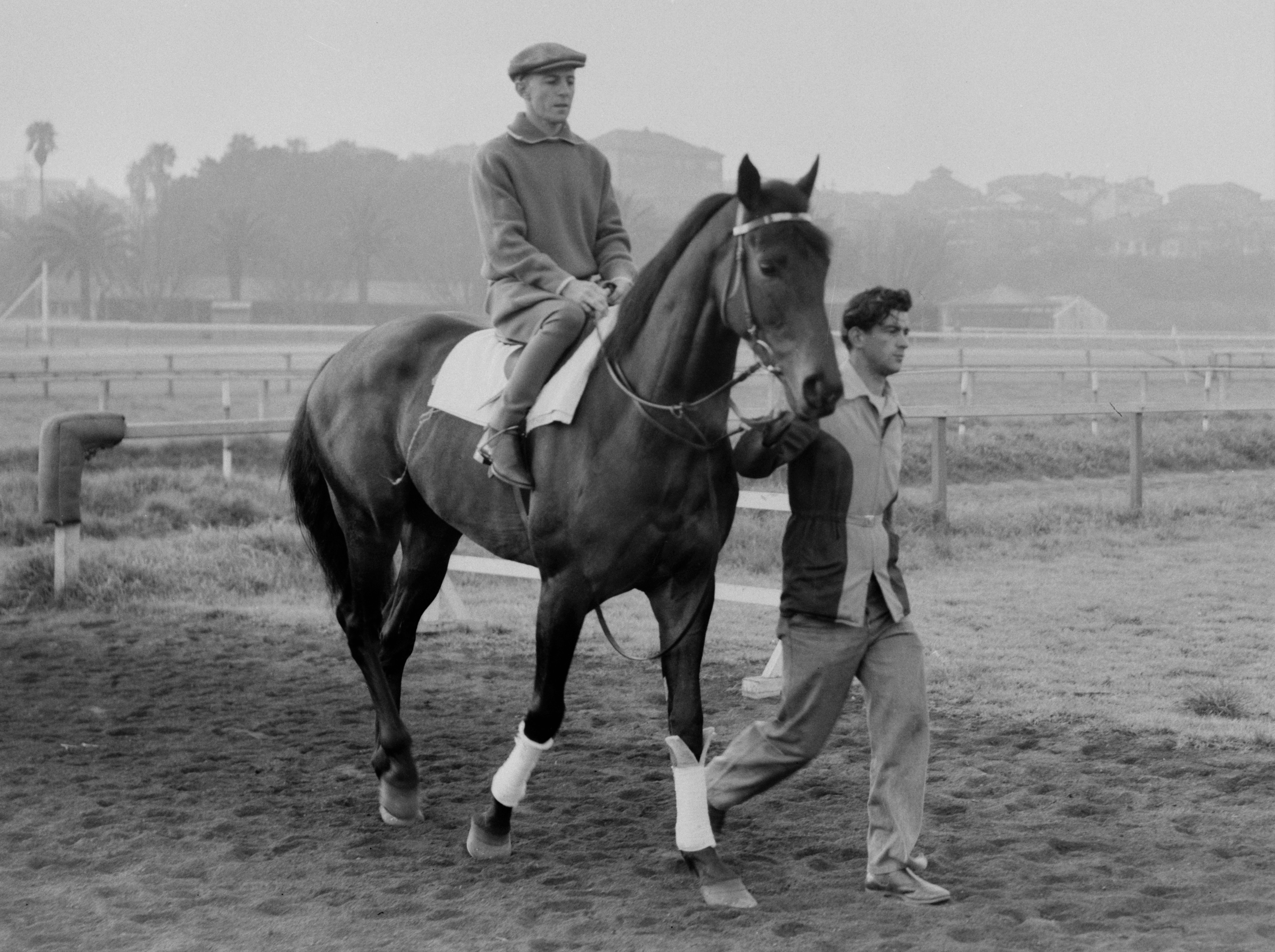
Prince Cortauld, 1954 & 1955 winner

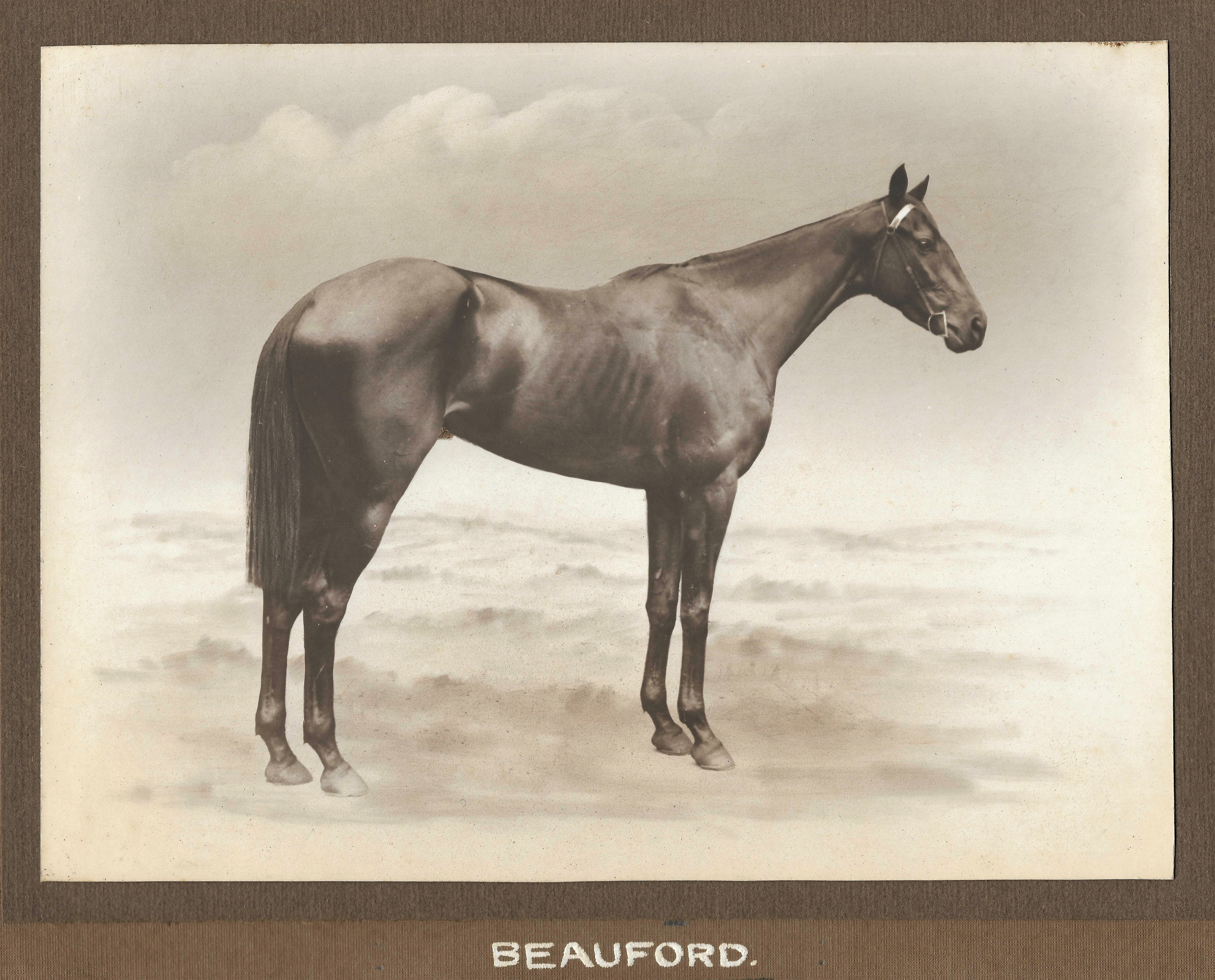
Beauford, 1921 winner

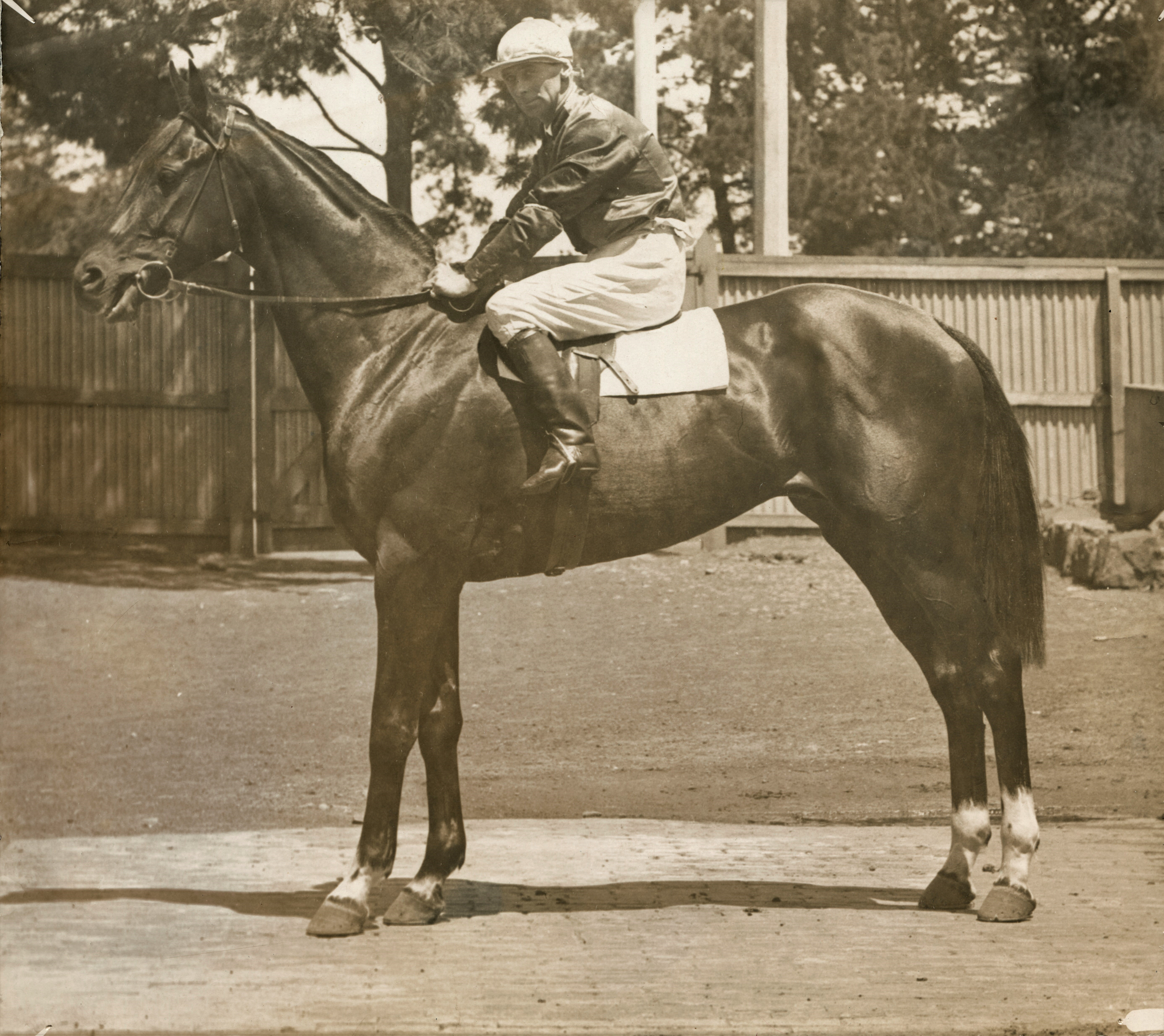
Biplane, 1917 winner B Deeley

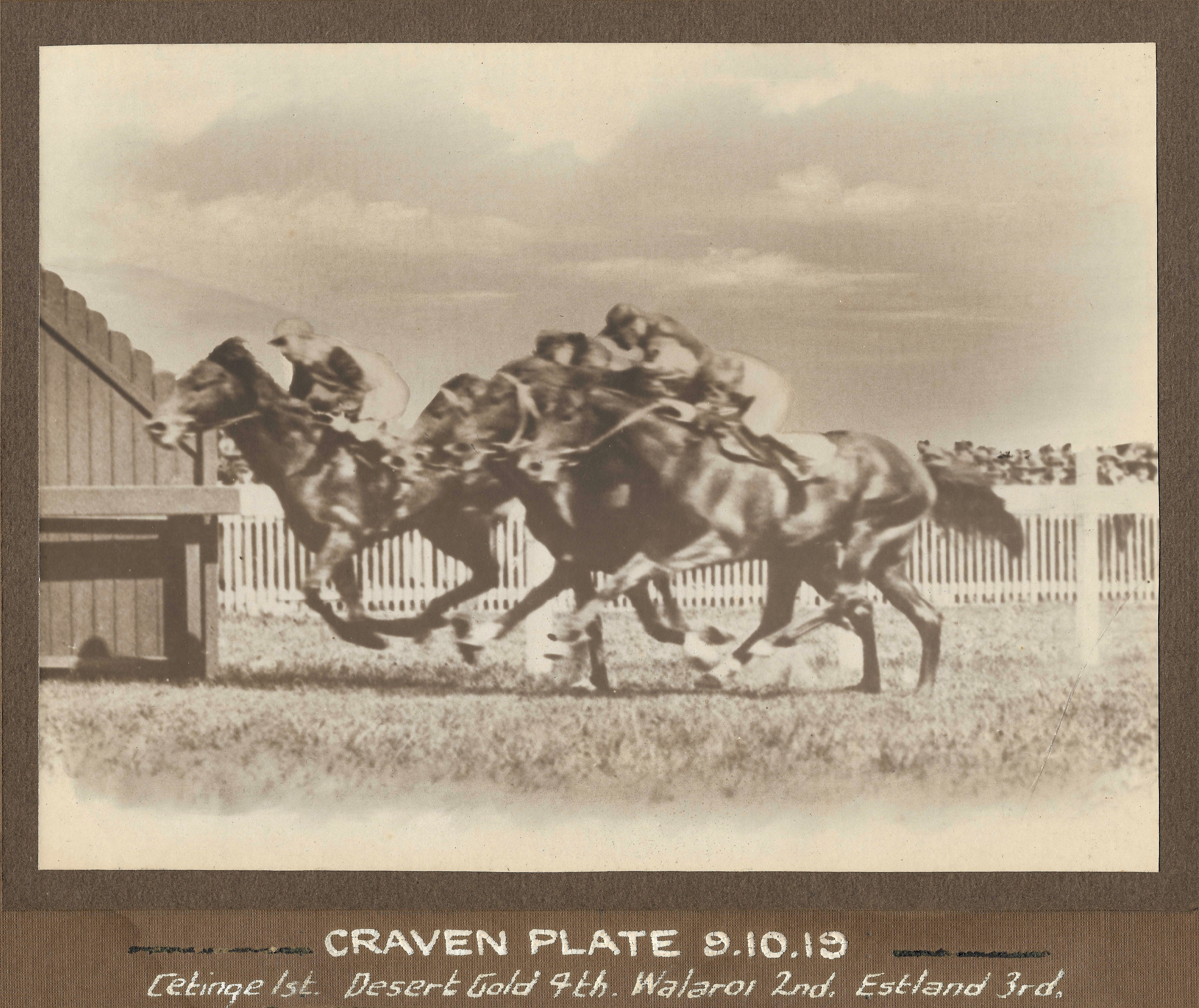
Cetigne, 1918 winner

== Winners ==
The following are past winners of the race.

- 2026 - Lindermann
- 2025 - Lindermann
- 2024 - Lindermann
- 2023 - Zeyrek
- 2022 - Cascadian
- 2021 - Think It Over
- 2020 - Think It Over
- 2019 - Happy Clapper
- 2018 - Moss 'n' Dale
- 2017 - Classic Uniform
- 2016 - It's Somewhat
- 2015 - Complacent
- 2014 - Moriarty
- 2013 - Honorius
- 2012 - Mourayan
- 2011 - My Kingdom Of Fife
- 2010 - C'est La Guerre
- 2009 - Miss Marielle
- 2008 - Lorne Dancer
- 2007 - †race not held
- 2006 - Cateclipse
- 2005 - Mummify
- 2004 - Fiery Venture
- 2003 - Shower Of Roses
- 2002 - Manner Hill
- 2001 - The Man
- 2000 - Yippyio
- 1999 - Tie The Knot
- 1998 - Sharscay
- 1997 - Yippyio
- 1996 - Adventurous
- 1995 - Stony Bay
- 1994 - Fraternity
- 1993 - Mahaya
- 1992 - Telesto
- 1991 - Lord Revenir
- 1990 - Dual Treasures
- 1989 - Sarah Fay
- 1988 - Balciano
- 1987 - Ostensible
- 1986 - Sotip
- 1985 - Hayai
- 1984 - Hayai
- 1979–83 - race not held
- 1978 - Ming Dynasty
- 1977 - Denise's Joy
- 1976 - Battle Heights
- 1975 - Dalrello
- 1974 - Leica Lover
- 1973 - Analie
- 1972 - Passetreul
- 1971 - Regal Rhythm
- 1970 - Planet Kingdom
- 1969 - Roman Consul
- 1968 - Prince Grant
- 1967 - Winfreux
- 1966 - Prince Grant
- 1965 - Strauss
- 1964 - Summer Regent
- 1963 - Summer Fair
- 1962 - Summer Fair
- 1961 - Nilarco
- 1960 - Tulloch
- 1959 - Travel Boy
- 1958 - Prince Darius
- 1957 - Prince Darius
- 1956 - Caranna
- 1955 - Prince Cortauld
- 1954 - Prince Cortauld
- 1953 - Tarien
- 1952 - Hydrogen
- 1951 - Hydrogen
- 1950 - Playboy
- 1949 - Carbon Copy
- 1948 - Karachi
- 1947 - Russia
- 1946 - race not held
- 1945 - Flight
- 1944 - Tea Rose
- 1943 - Flight
- 1942 - Yaralla
- 1941 - Beau Vite
- 1940 - Beau Vite
- 1939 - High Caste
- 1938 - Young Idea
- 1937 - Talking
- 1936 - Gay Blonde
- 1935 - Peter Pan
- 1934 - Chatham
- 1933 - Chatham
- 1932 - Chatham
- 1931 - Phar Lap
- 1930 - Phar Lap
- 1929 - Phar Lap
- 1928 - Amounis
- 1927 - Limerick
- 1926 - Windbag
- 1925 - Windbag
- 1924 - Gloaming
- 1923 - Rivoli
- 1922 - Gloaming
- 1921 - Beauford
- 1920 - Greenstead
- 1919 - Gloaming
- 1918 - Cetigne
- 1917 - Biplane
- 1916 - Carlita
- 1915 - St. Carwyne
- 1914 - Woorak
- 1913 - Duke Foote
- 1912 - Duke Foote
- 1911 - Lady Medallist
- 1910 - Parsee
- 1909 - Maltine
- 1908 - Mooltan
- 1907 - Mountain King
- 1906 - Solution
- 1905 - Gladsome
- 1904 - Emir
- 1903 - Ibex
- 1902 - Wakeful
- 1901 - Hautvilliers
- 1900 - Paul Pry
- 1899 - Le Var
- 1898 - The Grafter
- 1897 - Delaware
- 1896 - Newhaven
- 1895 - Delaware
- 1894 - Patron
- 1893 - Loyalty
- 1892 - Bungebah
- 1891 - Marvel
- 1890 - Carbine
- 1889 - Abercorn
- 1888 - Abercorn
- 1887 - Trident
- 1886 - Trident
- 1885 - Nordenfeldt
- 1884 - Sir Modred
- 1883 - Legrand
- 1882 - Sting
- 1881 - Wellington
- 1880 - Sweetmeat
- 1879 - Baronet
- 1878 - Chester
- 1877 - Robinson Crusoe
- 1876 - Malta
- 1876 - Valentia
- 1875 - Kingsborough
- 1874 - Maid Of Avenel
- 1873 - Hamlet
- 1872 - Dagworth
- 1871 - Tim Whiffler
- 1870 - Tim Whiffler
- 1869 - Glencoe
- 1868 - The Barb
- 1867 - Yattendon

† Not held because of outbreak of equine influenza

== See also ==
- Spring Champion Stakes
- Stan Fox Stakes (Callander-Presnell)
- List of Australian Group races
- Group races
