= Harry Knight (farmer) =

New Zealand farmer (1860–1935)

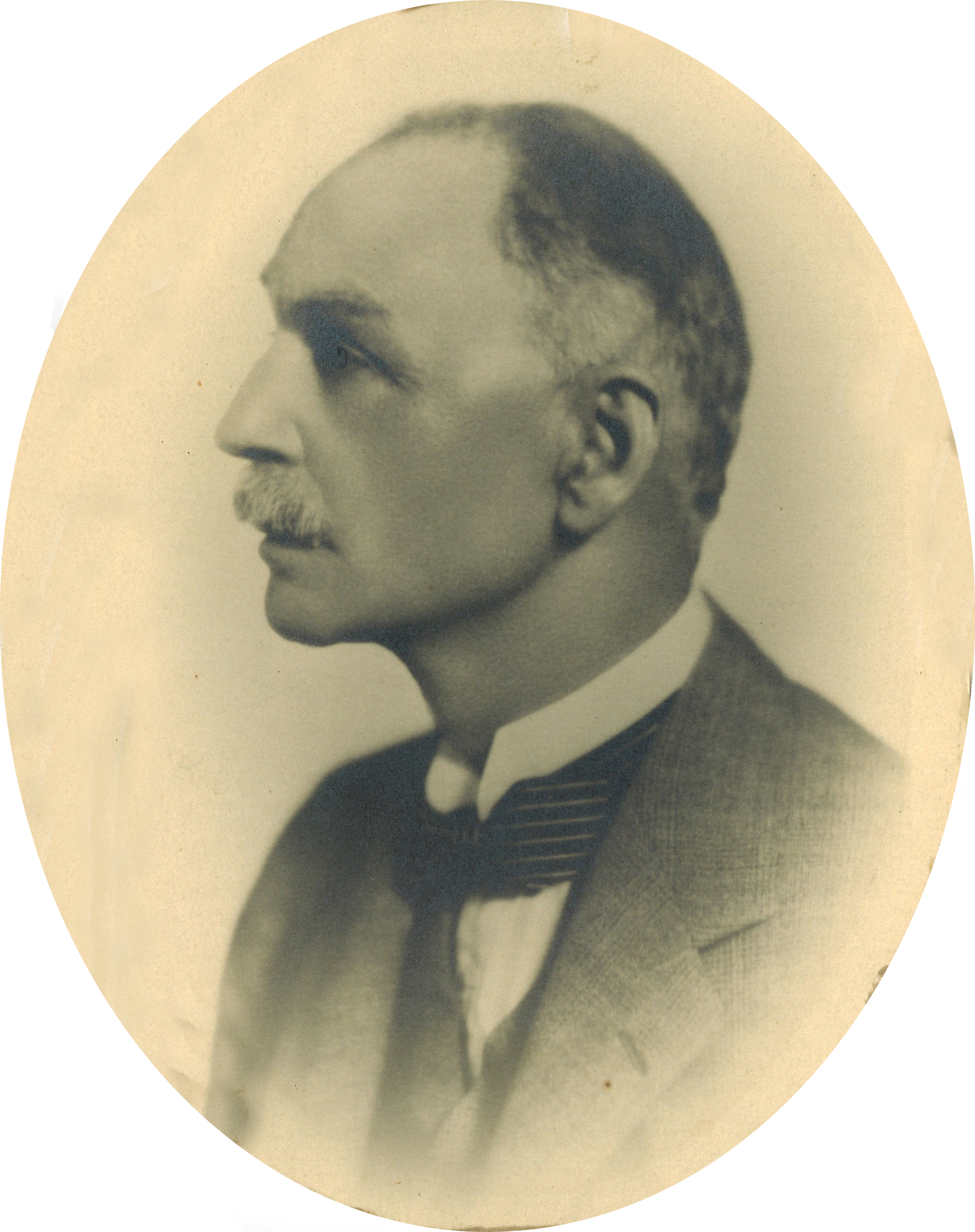
Henry Arthur Knight

Henry Arthur Knight (29 August 1860 – 3 October 1935) was a New Zealand sheep farmer, racehorse owner, and local politician. He was the first student and the third director of the Canterbury Agricultural College.

Knight was born in 1860; his parents were Richard and Lucy Knight. He received his secondary education at Christ's College in Christchurch. When the School of Agriculture of Canterbury University College opened at Lincoln on 19 July 1880, Knight was the first student to enrol. He graduated in 1882 with a Diploma of Agriculture.

In 1887, he married Beatrice Dicken, the daughter of Thomas Dicken. They were to have three daughters. One of his daughters was the mother of the painter Austen Deans.

In 1899, Knight was elected to the Board of Governors of his alma mater, by then called the Canterbury Agricultural College, and he remained a member until his death. He was chairman of the board from 1915 until 1926. He lost the chairmanship when the Canterbury members of the House of Representatives had a tie when they elected their representative in December 1926. The returning officer gave his casting vote to Knight's opponent, George Murray, and Knight temporarily lost his position on the board. In 1930, Knight was the inaugural Bledisloe Medal recipient.

Knight had the Racecourse Hill property near Darfield from 1885. It was a large property and Knight grew the most wheat north of the Rakaia River; up to 1,600 acres (650 ha) of his land were in wheat. When his property was cut up in the late 1890, Knight started breeding race horses. He started having success after 15 years and from 1915 until his death, it is estimated that his horses have won him NZ£76,000. His horse Malaga won the Auckland Cup in 1921, netting him NZ£3500. His mare Medley produced Ballymena and Limerick, both very successful horses.

Knight was chairman of the Malvern County Council from 1911. He was chairman of the New Zealand Refrigeration Company from 1912. He was a member of the Canterbury Jockey Club.

Knight commissioned architect Cecil Wood to design a homestead for Racecourse Hill. The English Domestic Revival house was finished in 1912. Knight died at Racecourse Hill on 3 October 1935.
