= Windbag (horse) =

Australian-bred Thoroughbred racehorse

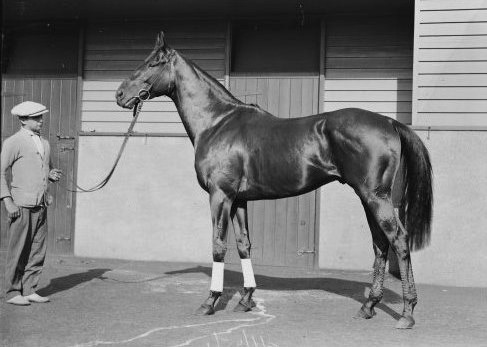
- Windbag
- Sire: Magpie (GB)
- Grandsire: Dark Ronald (GB)
- Dam: Charleville (NZ)
- Damsire: Charlemagne II (GB)
- Sex: Stallion
- Foaled: 1921
- Died: 1944
- Country: Australia
- Colour: Bay
- Breeder: Percy Miller
- Owner: Robert Miller
- Trainer: George Price
- Record: 36:18-8-2
- Earnings: £35,939

Major wins
- AJC St Leger (1925); AJC Cumberland Stakes (1925); AJC Randwick Plate (1925); AJC Plate (1925, 1926); Chelmsford Stakes (1925); Craven Plate (1925, 1926); Melbourne Cup (1925); AJC Spring Stakes (1925); Chipping Norton Stakes (1926); AJC Autumn Stakes (1926); Warwick Stakes (1926)
- Last updated on 24 October 2018

Windbag (1921−1944) was an Australian bred Thoroughbred racehorse who won the 1925 Melbourne Cup.

== 1925 Melbourne Cup ==
Starting the 7/4 favourite, Windbag won the cup by half a length in front of a crowd of 106,828 at Flemington Racecourse. He set a new record time for the race of 3.22.75.

After retiring from racing in 1927, Windbag commenced stallion duties where he sired 212 individual winners, including the Australian Racing Hall of Fame horse Chatham. Windbag died in 1944 aged 23 years.

== 1926 racebook ==
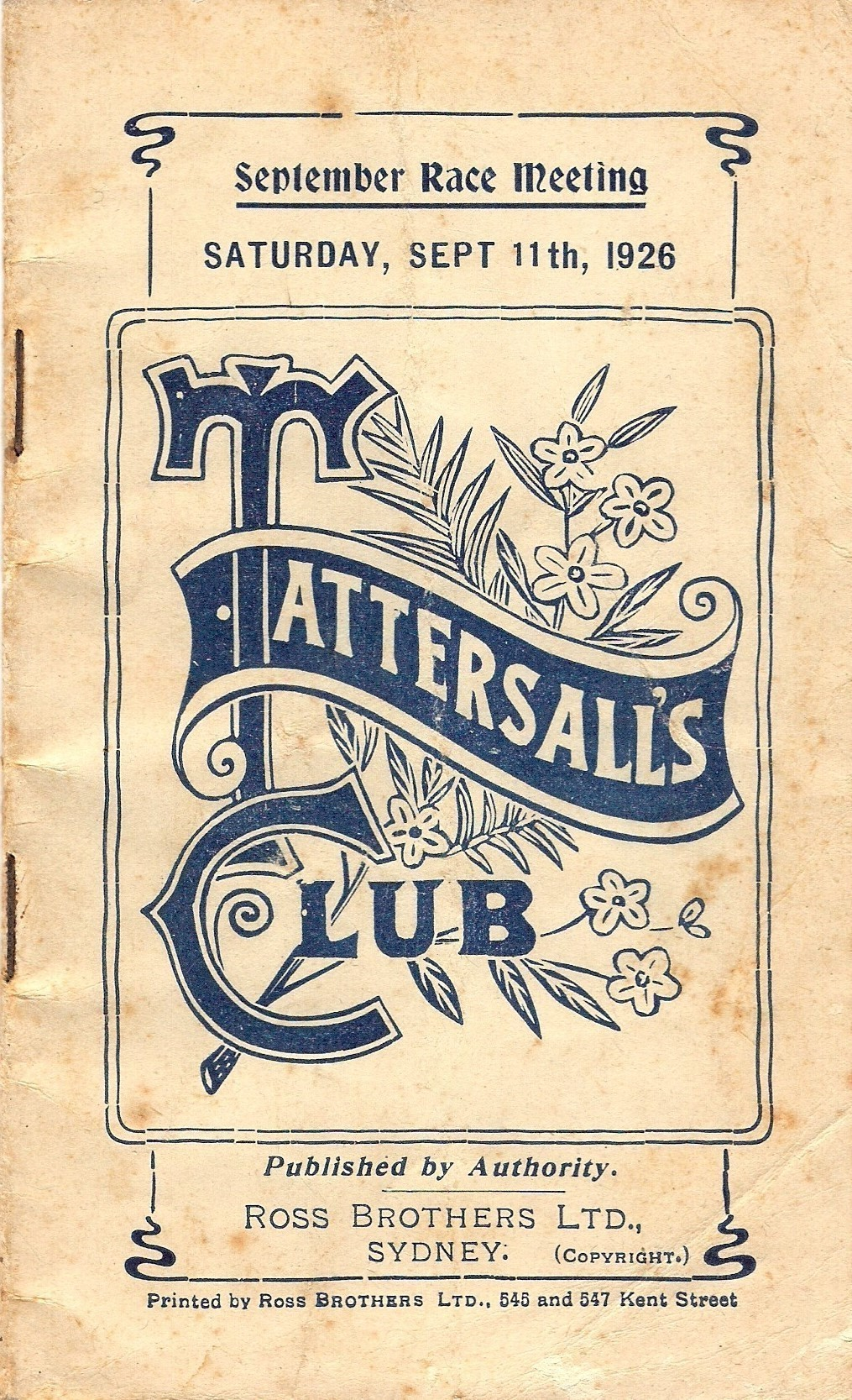
1926 Tatts Chelmsford Stakes racebook front cover

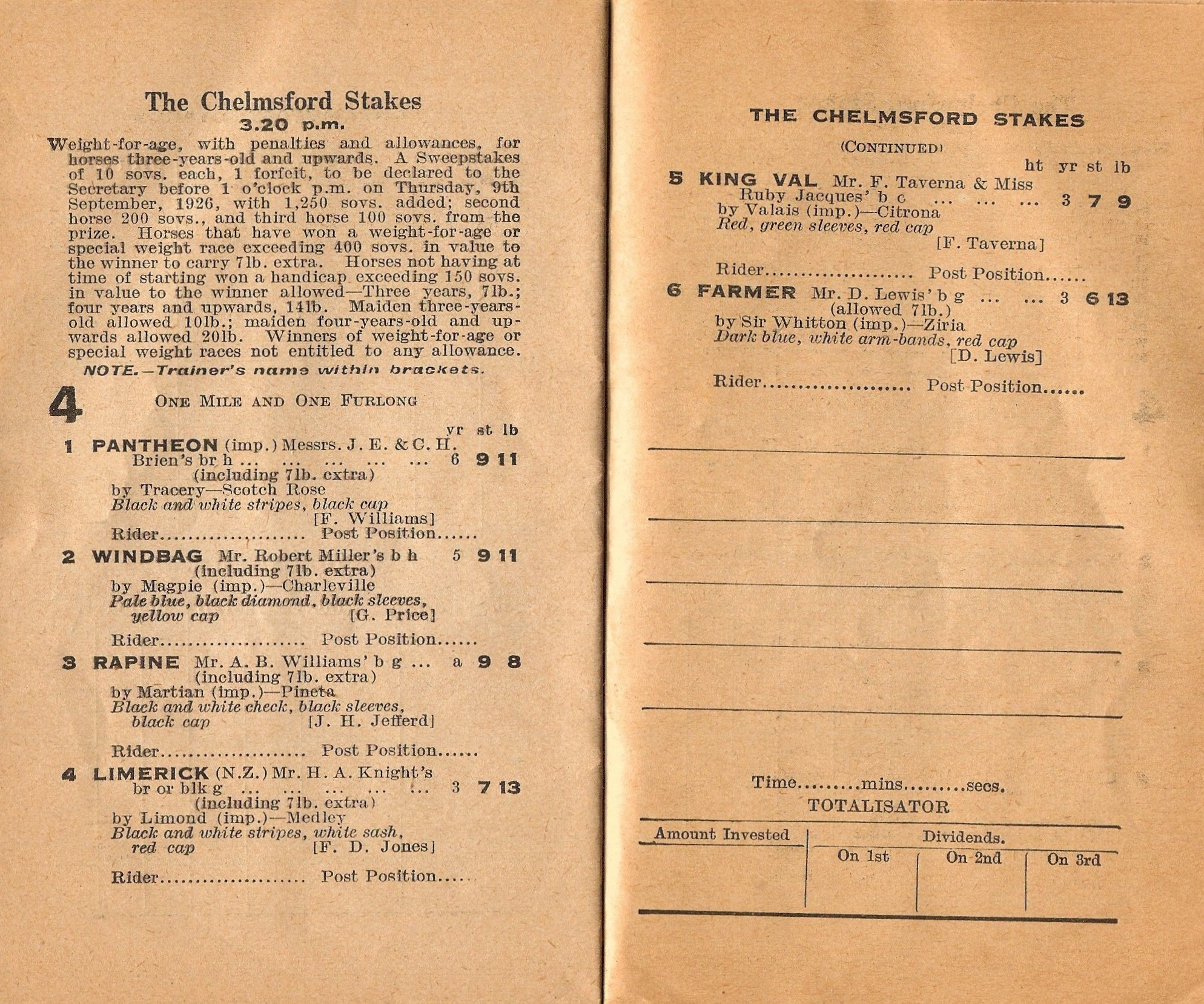
1926 Tatts Chelmsford Stakes starters showing 2nd placed Windbag

== Image gallery ==
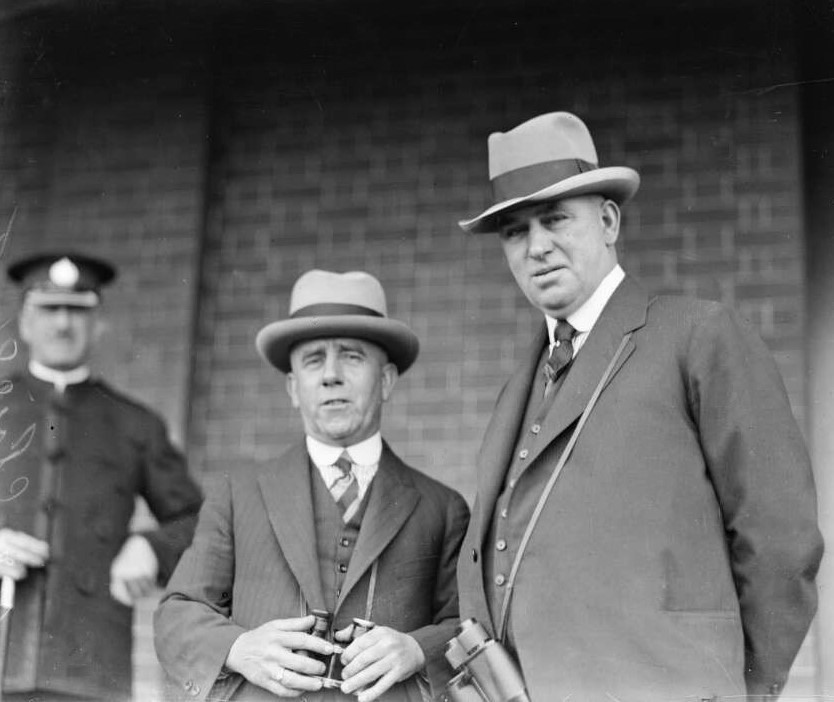
George Price and Robert Miller Randwick Racecourse

== Sire line tree ==
- Windbag
  - Chatham
    - High Rank
    - Craigie
    - Chatspa
    - Conservator
  - Beamish Boy

== Pedigree ==
Pedigree of Windbag (AUS) 1921
Sire Magpie (GB) 1914	Dark Ronald (IRE); 1905	Bay Ronald	Hampton
Sire Magpie (GB) 1914	Dark Ronald (IRE); 1905	Bay Ronald	Black Duchess
Sire Magpie (GB) 1914	Dark Ronald (IRE); 1905	Darkie	Thurio
Sire Magpie (GB) 1914	Dark Ronald (IRE); 1905	Darkie	Insignia
Sire Magpie (GB) 1914	Popinjay (GB); 1905	St Frusquin	St Simon*
Sire Magpie (GB) 1914	Popinjay (GB); 1905	St Frusquin	Isabel
Sire Magpie (GB) 1914	Popinjay (GB); 1905	Chelandry	Goldfinch
Sire Magpie (GB) 1914	Popinjay (GB); 1905	Chelandry	Illuminata
Dam Charleville (NZ) 1911	Charlemagne (GB); 1904	St Simon*	Galopin*
Dam Charleville (NZ) 1911	Charlemagne (GB); 1904	St Simon*	St Angela*
Dam Charleville (NZ) 1911	Charlemagne (GB); 1904	Perfect Dream	Morion
Dam Charleville (NZ) 1911	Charlemagne (GB); 1904	Perfect Dream	Rosebud
Dam Charleville (NZ) 1911	Nithsevo (NZ); 1903	Stepniak	Nordenfeldt
Dam Charleville (NZ) 1911	Nithsevo (NZ); 1903	Stepniak	Steppe
Dam Charleville (NZ) 1911	Nithsevo (NZ); 1903	Shepherdess	Fitz Donovan
Dam Charleville (NZ) 1911	Nithsevo (NZ); 1903	Shepherdess	Iolanthe

* Windbag is inbred 4S x 3D to the stallion St Simon, meaning that he appears fourth generation on the sire side of his pedigree, and third generation on the dam side of his pedigree.
