= Supercopa =

Supercopa can refer to:

- Supercopa de España (disambiguation)
- Supercopa do Brasil, a Brazilian football (soccer) competition.
- Supercopa Honduras, a defunct Honduran football (soccer) competition.
- Supercopa de Costa Rica, a Costa Rican Football (soccer) competition.
- Copa Master de Supercopa, a defunct South American football (soccer) competition.
- Supercopa Libertadores, a defunct South American football (soccer) competition.
