= King's Cup =

King's Cup (incl. translations), may refer to:

== Sports ==
=== Football ===
- Copa del Rey, Spanish for "King's Cup," the main national knockout tournament in men's football
- King's Cup (Bahrain), the premier national knockout football tournament
- King's Cup (Bhutan), former name for the Jigme Dorji Wangchuk Memorial Gold Cup, a football tournament
- King's Cup (Saudi Arabia), Saudi Arabian men's football national knockout competition
- King's Cup (Thailand), international tournament in Thailand

=== Watersports ===
- King's Cup (rowing), interstate men's eight race at the Australian Rowing Championships
- King's Cup (yachting), yachting race in New York
- Phuket King's Cup Regatta, Asian regatta in Thailand

=== Other sports ===
- AJC Kings Cup, former name of the Queen Elizabeth Stakes (ATC), a horse race held in Sydney, Australia
- Brand's Crossword Game King's Cup, Scrabble tournament held in Bangkok, Thailand
- King's Cup (air race), annual British handicapped cross-country air race
- King's Cup (golf), golf tournament on the Asian Tour
- King's Cup (horse race), former name (1927–1951) of Queen's Cup, an Australian horse race held annually in rotation in different states
- King's Cup (Muay Thai), annual tournament in Thailand
- King's Cup (rugby union), a tournament held in 1919 for World War I's Allied forces
- King's Cup (snooker), snooker competition held in Thailand
- King's Cup Elephant Polo, championship Elephant polo event in Thailand
- King's Cup Sepaktakraw World Championship, sepak takraw team event in Thailand

== Other uses ==
- The King's Cup, a 1933 UK drama film
- Kings (drinking game), also known as King's Cup

== See also ==
- Copa del Rey (disambiguation)
- Coupe du Roi, a Spa24 title
- Kingcup or marsh marigold (Caltha palustris), a perennial herbaceous flowering marsh plant
- Kings' Cup (United States), the rivalry between American soccer clubs Louisville City and Saint Louis FC
- Queen's Cup (disambiguation)
