= Shannon (horse) =

Australian-bred Thoroughbred racehorse

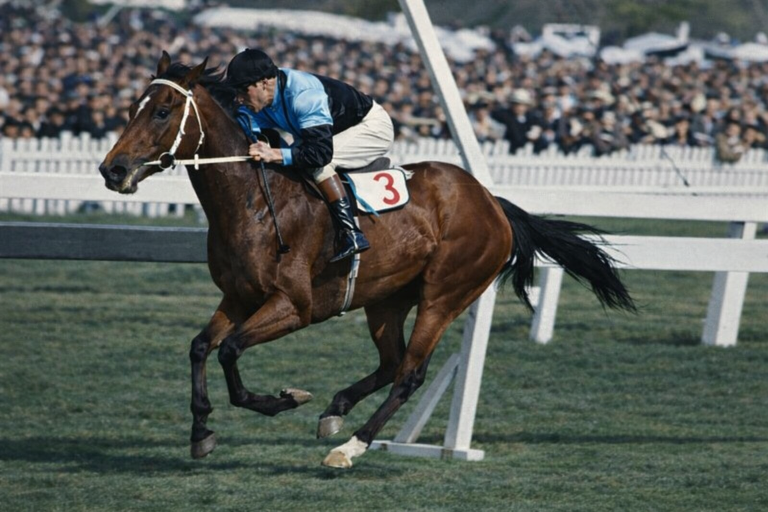
- Shannon and Darby Munro
- Sire: Midstream (GB)
- Grandsire: Blandford
- Dam: Idle Words
- Damsire: Magpie (GB)
- Sex: Stallion
- Foaled: 1941
- Country: Australia
- Colour: Bay
- Breeder: Kia Ora Stud
- Owner: Peter Riddle (Australia); W.J. Smith; Neil S. McCarthy (United States)
- Trainer: Peter Riddle (Australia); William Molter (United States)
- Record: 44: 20-8-7
- Earnings: £19,567½ (AUS) + $211,610 (USA)

Major wins
- AJC Sires Produce Stakes (1944); Hobartville Stakes (1944); Tramway Handicap (1945); Epsom Handicap (1945); Hill Stakes (1945); AJC Kings Cup (1946); Theo Marks Stakes (1946); George Main Stakes (1946,1947); Canterbury Stakes (1947); Forty Niner Stakes (1948); Argonaut Handicap (1948); Hollywood Gold Cup (1948); Golden Gate Handicap (1948); San Francisco Handicap (1948)

Awards
- TSD American Champion Older Male Horse (1948)

Honours
- Australian Racing Hall of Fame (2006); Shannon Stakes at Rosehill Racecourse
- Last updated on 8 September 2009

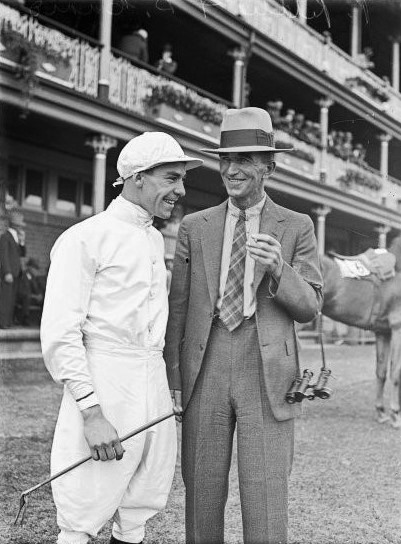
Darby Munro, who rode Shannon to a number of wins, with Peter Riddle

Shannon (1941–1955), named Shannon II in America, was an outstanding Australian Thoroughbred racehorse who was inducted into the Hall of Fame. He created new racecourse records in Australia before he was sold to an American buyer who exported him to California in 1948. There Shannon equalled the world record of 1:47 3/5 for the nine furlongs (1,800 metres) in winning the Forty Niner Handicap Stakes, then one week later equalled the world record of 1:59 4/5 for a mile and a quarter (2,000 metres). Shannon was named the 1948 American Champion Older Male Horse. At stud in America he proved to be a good sire.

== Breeding ==
He was by the leading sire, Midstream (GB) (sire of 39 stakes-winners that won 120 stakes races) from the race-winner, Idle Words by the good sire, Magpie (GB). Idle Words was the dam of 12 foals, of which 11 raced with 8 winners, including three stakes-winners: Bernbrook (by Midstream), won AJC Doncaster Handicap etc., exported to US; Defame (by Delville Wood) dam of a stakes-winner; and Lysander (by Midstream), won City Tattersall's Cup.

Shannon was owned and trained by Peter Riddle who selected him from the Kia Ora Stud yearlings and paid £367 for him at the Sydney yearling sales.

=== 1945 and 1946 racebooks ===
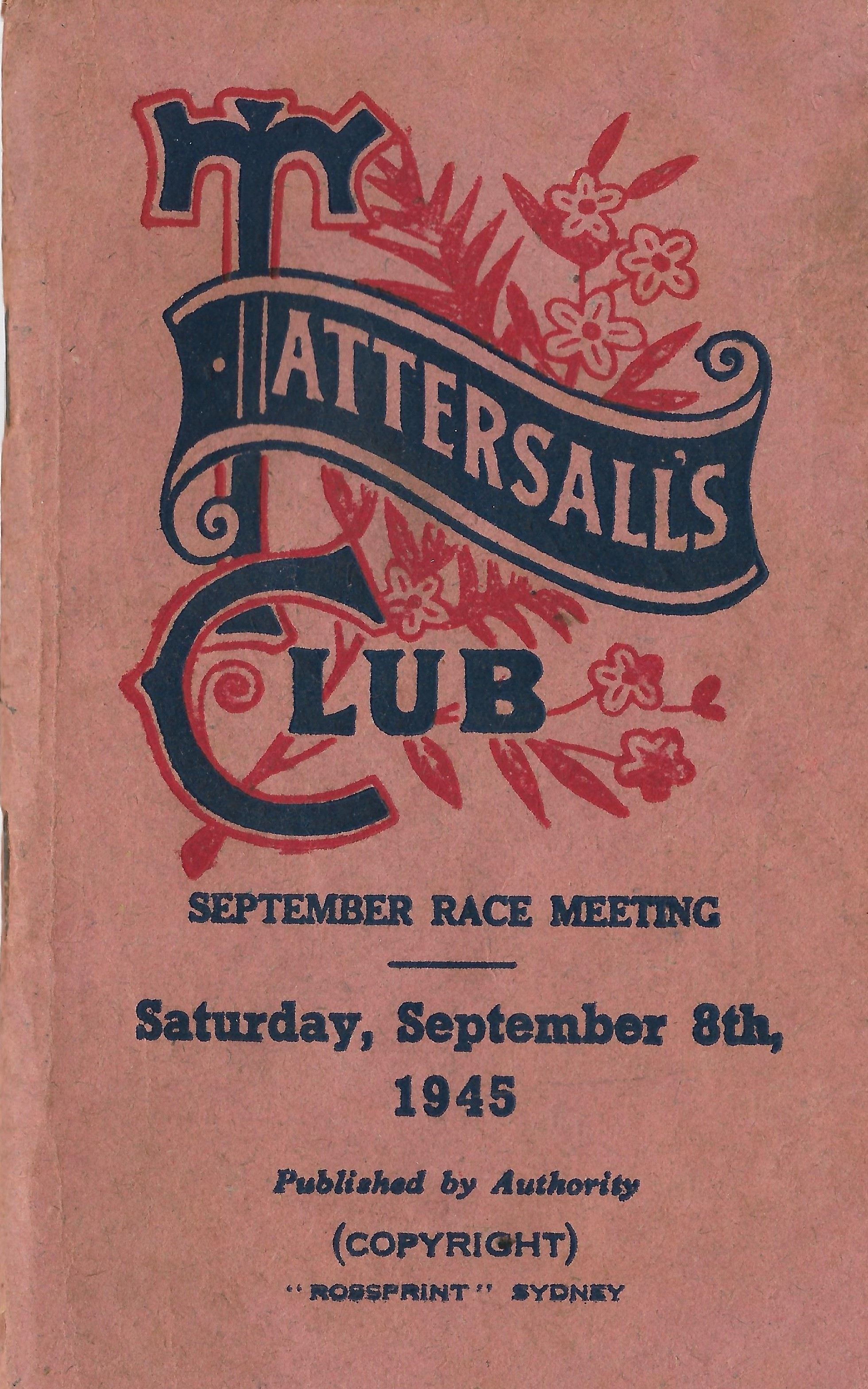
1945 Tramway Handicap racebook front cover

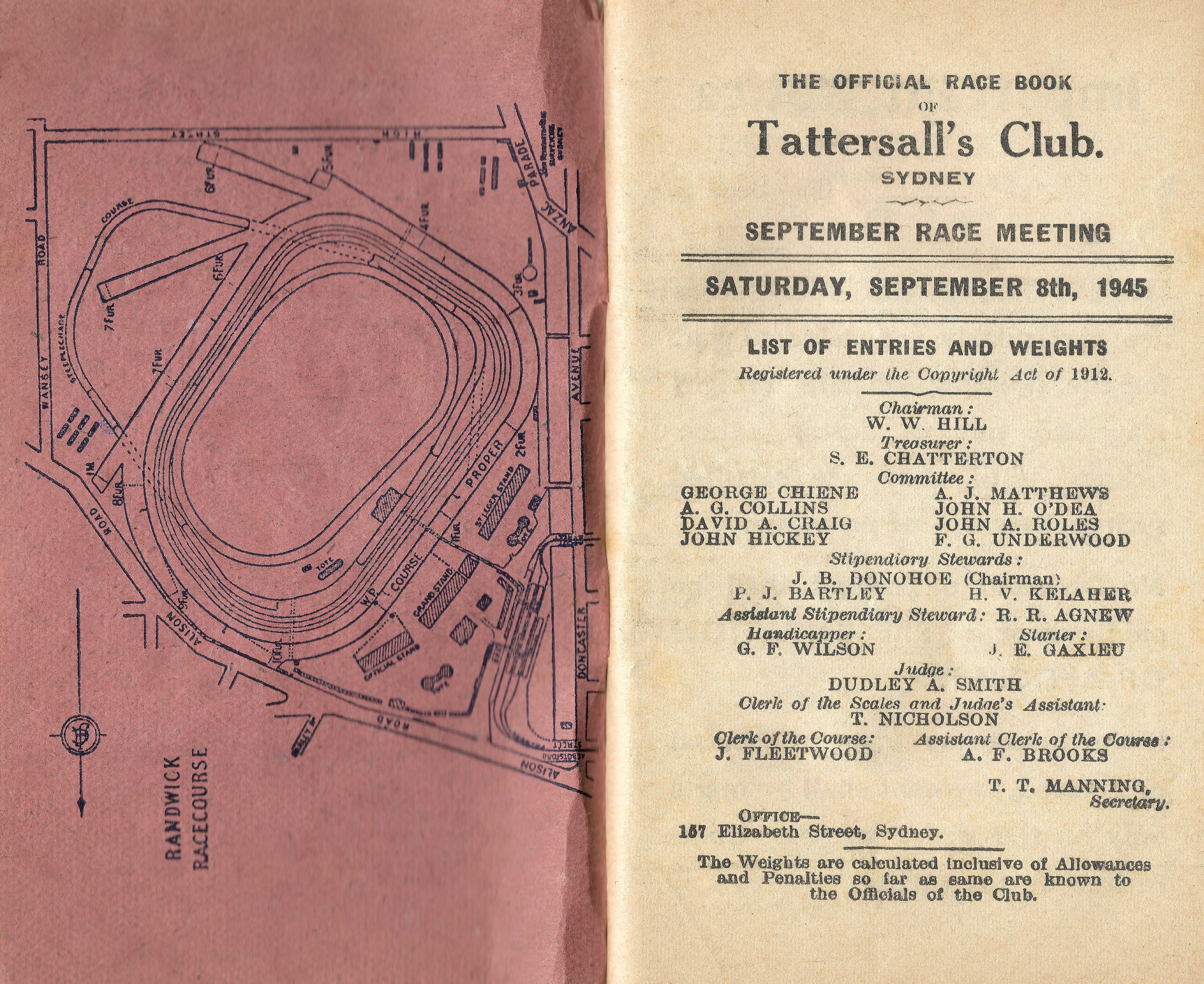
1945 Tramway Handicap racebook showing raceday officials

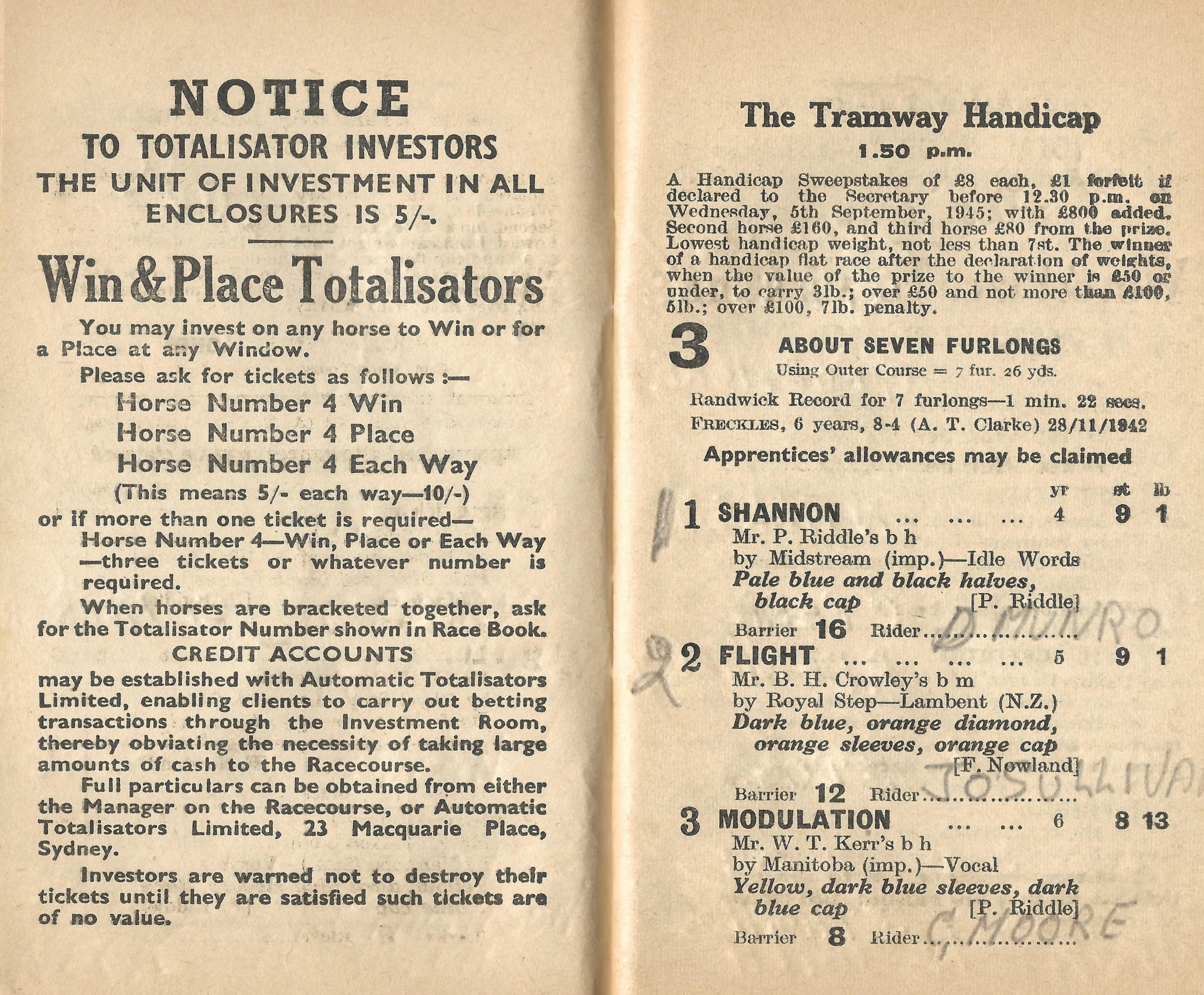
1945 Tramway Handicap racebook showing the winner, Shannon

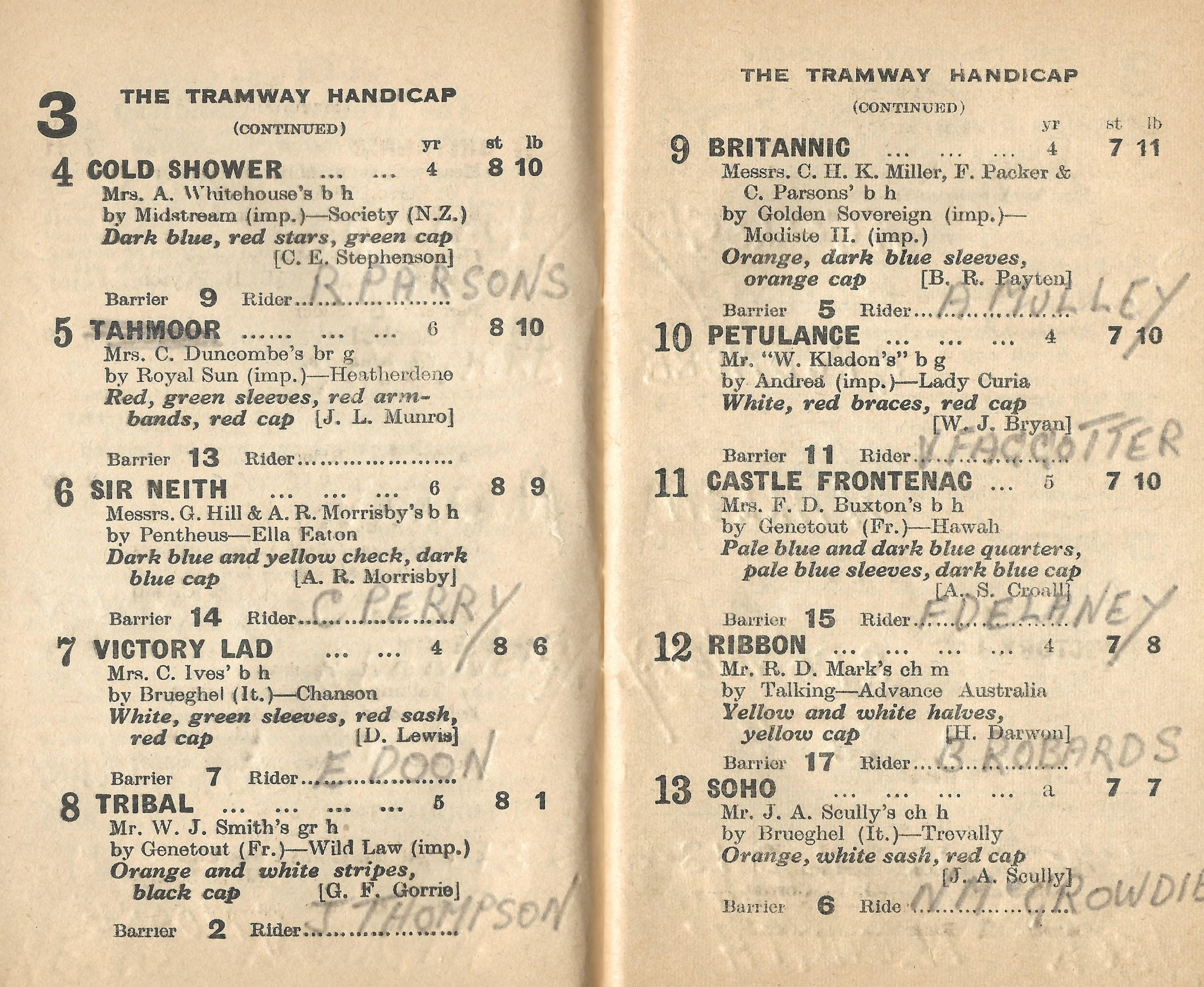
1945 Tramway Handicap racebook starters and results

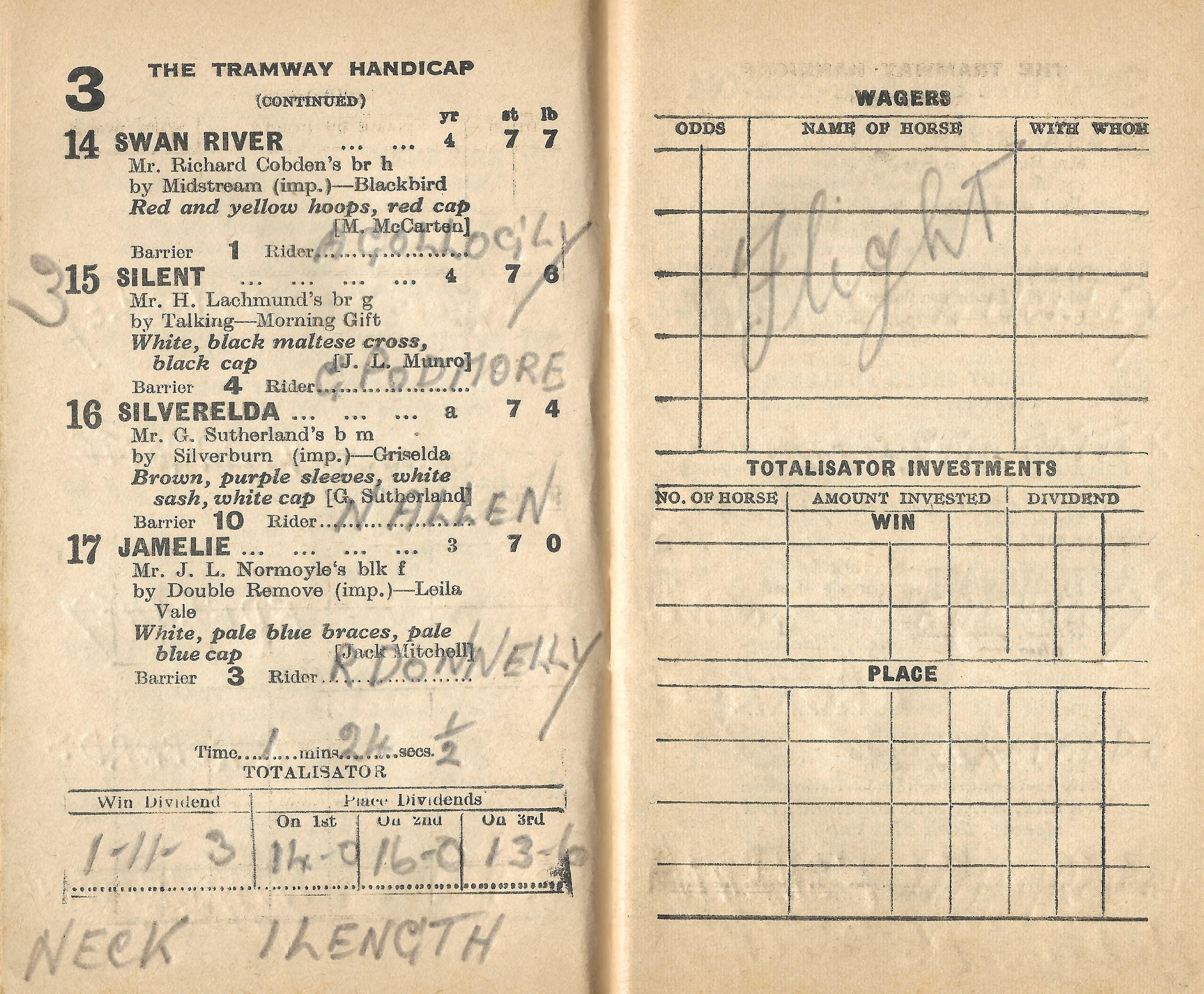
1945 Tramway Handicap racebook starters and results

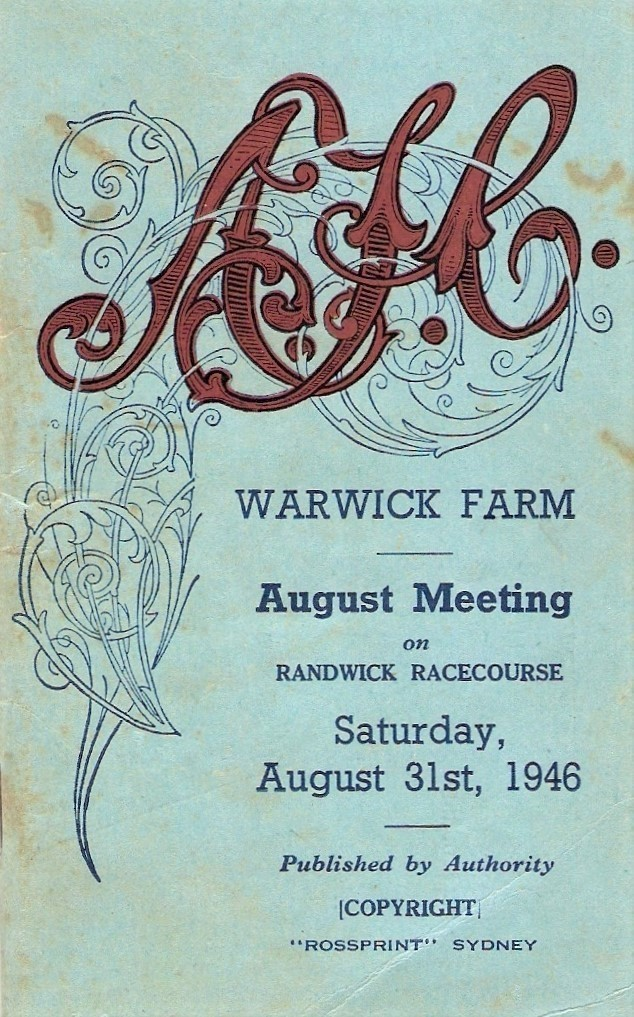
1946 AJC Warwick Stakes racebook front cover

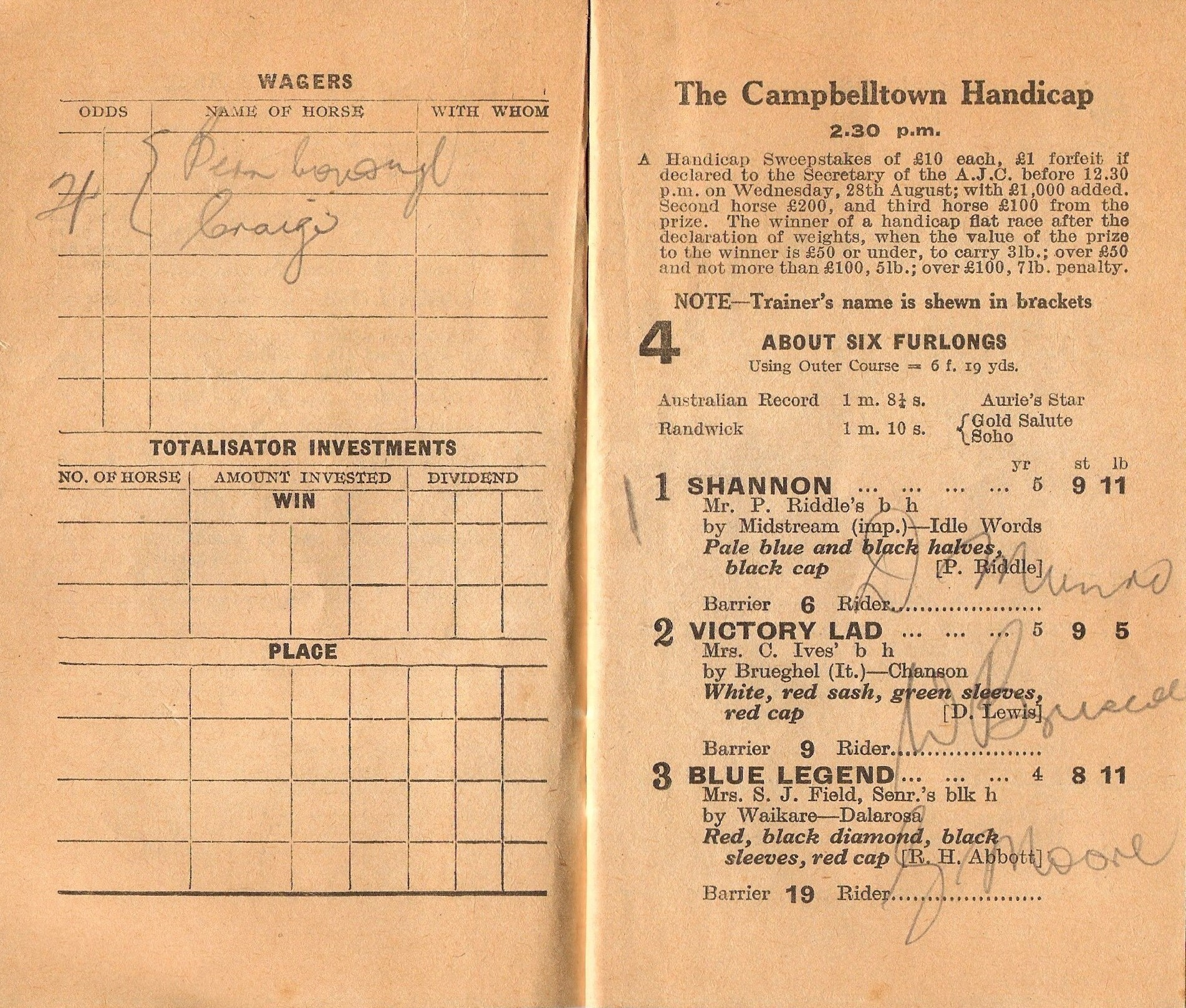
1946 AJC Campbelltown Handicap page starters and results showing the winner, Shannon

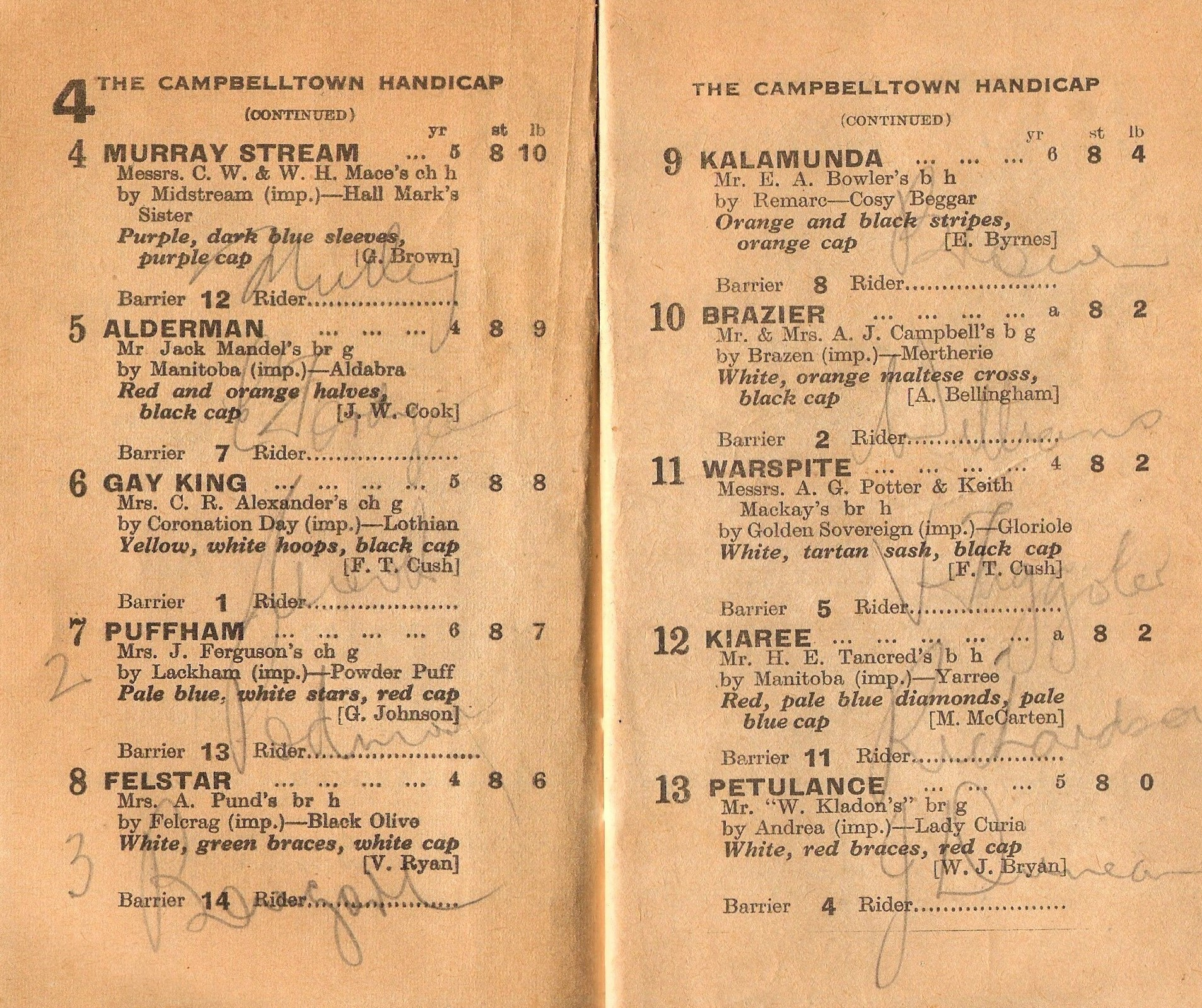
1946 AJC Campbelltown Handicap page starters and results

== Racing record ==
=== At two years: 1943-1944 ===
Shannon won the 1943 AJC Two-year-old Handicap, the AJC Kirkham Stakes, and the 1944 AJC Sires' Produce Stakes over seven furlongs. During the season, he had seven starts for three wins, three seconds, and one unplaced run.

=== At three years: 1944-1945 ===
In his first three-year-old start, Shannon was unplaced in the STC Flying Handicap, but then won the Hobartville Stakes from a very good field before he finished unplaced in the Rosehill Guineas and AJC Derby. He did not have start again for ten months.

=== At four years: 1945-1946 ===
Shannon started as a four-year-old, with 9 stone 1 pound (58 kg) in the AJC Campbelltown Handicap over 6 furlongs, which he won at long odds. Next he met and defeated the great mare Flight at even weights in the Tattersalls NSW Tramway Handicap. His win in the STC Hill Stakes made him the favourite for the AJC Epsom Handicap. Shannon was the winner by a neck from Melhero, with Silent the same distance away in third place. He scored four wins from four starts for the season before Flight relegated him into second place in the Craven Plate. Shannon was then spelled (rested) during the autumn and winter.

=== At five years: 1946-1947 ===
As a five-year-old, Shannon repeated his Campbelltown Handicap win carrying 9 st 11 lb (62 kg) and at his next start had a win in the Theo Marks Quality Handicap. He is probably best remembered for not winning the Epsom Handicap that season, when he appeared to be unbeatable. As a short-priced favourite for the 1946 Epsom Handicap, Shannon missed the start and did not move from his starting position until the rest of the field had travelled about a hundred metres. Despite the setback, his jockey, Darby Munro, took off after the field and failed only by half a head to catch winner Blue Legend and just past the post was in front. On his return to scale, Munro was given a hostile reception for his ride. It was later disclosed that the starter had failed to see that Shannon was not facing up.

Two days later, he won the George Main Stakes in an Australasian record time of 1.34½ by six lengths from Flight with Magnificent a further four lengths away in third place. The next Saturday, Shannon defeated Flight in the King's Cup, which included Russia, who won the Melbourne Cup four weeks later.

=== At six years: 1947-1948 ===
When his owner-trainer died, Shannon was auctioned in Sydney and purchased by W.J. Smith for £27,300. He raced four more times in Australia in the next spring to register two wins in the Canterbury Stakes and George Main Stakes and a second in the Warwick Stakes. Shannon was again sold again in early 1948, this time to American Neil McCarthy for a reported £52,000. His last start in Australia ended in defeat with him finishing second to Russia in the 1947 AJC Craven Plate.

Shannon was one of the best middle-distance horses to race in Australia with a tally of 25 starts in Australia for 14 wins including the AJC George Main Stakes and the AJC Sires Produce Stakes.

=== Racing in the United States ===
In 1948, new owner Neil McCarthy of California entrusted Shannon's race conditioning to trainer William Molter. At Hollywood Park Racetrack in June, Shannon won the Argonaut Handicap and then, on 17 July, won the most prestigious race of his American career: the Hollywood Gold Cup. At Golden Gate Fields on 17 October 1948, he equalled the world record of 1:47 3/5 for the nine furlongs (1,800 metres) in winning the Forty Niner Handicap Stakes, then one week later at the same track equalled the world record of 1:59 4/5 for a mile and a quarter (2,000 metres) while capturing the Golden Gate Handicap. In America, he was second to Citation with Shannon being the leading money earner in his division. In November he won his last race, the San Francisco Handicap at Tanforan Racetrack. Shannon was named the 1948 American Champion Older Male Horse in a poll conducted by Turf and Sports Digest magazine. The equivalent award in rival Daily Racing Form poll was "Champion Handicap Horse" and included three-year-olds: it was won by Citation.

== Stud record ==
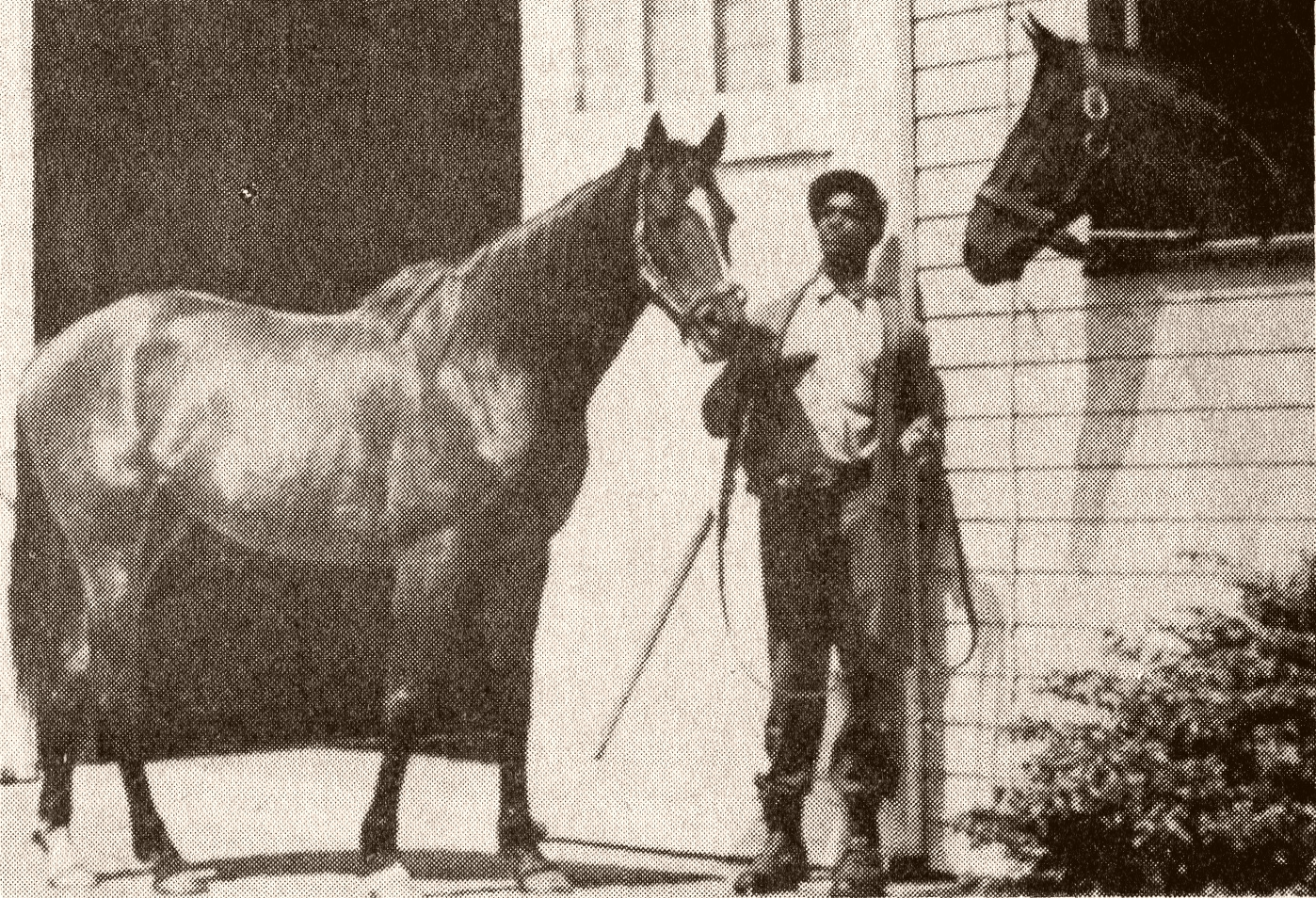
Bernborough meets Shannon II in America

Sold for US$300,000 to a breeding syndicate led by Leslie Combs II, Shannon was retired to stud duty and stood alongside another Australian champion Bernborough at Combs' Spendthrift Farm in Lexington, Kentucky, where he had a successful career as a sire. Eleven of his first crop yearlings averaged $11,755 each. The best of his progeny were Clem ($535,681) who defeated Round Table in track record time in the Washington Park Handicap, and Sea O Erin ($407,259), who won the Citation Handicap and 18 other races. Shannon sired the winners of more than $4 million while he was at stud in Kentucky.

In 1955, Shannon broke a leg and was humanely euthanized. He is buried in an unmarked grave at Green Gates Farm, which was formerly part of Spendthrift Farm.

== Honours ==
Shannon was the American Co-Champion Older Male Horse, along with Citation, in 1948.

He was inducted into the Australian Racing Hall of Fame on 4 July 2006. The Shannon Stakes named in his honour is held annually at Rosehill Gardens Racecourse.

== Sire line tree ==
- Shannon
  - County Clare
  - Sea O Erin
  - Clem
    - Clem Pac
    - Acclimatization
