= Kia Ora Stud =

Racehorse stud farm in Australia

Coordinates: 32.1185°S 150.9494°E

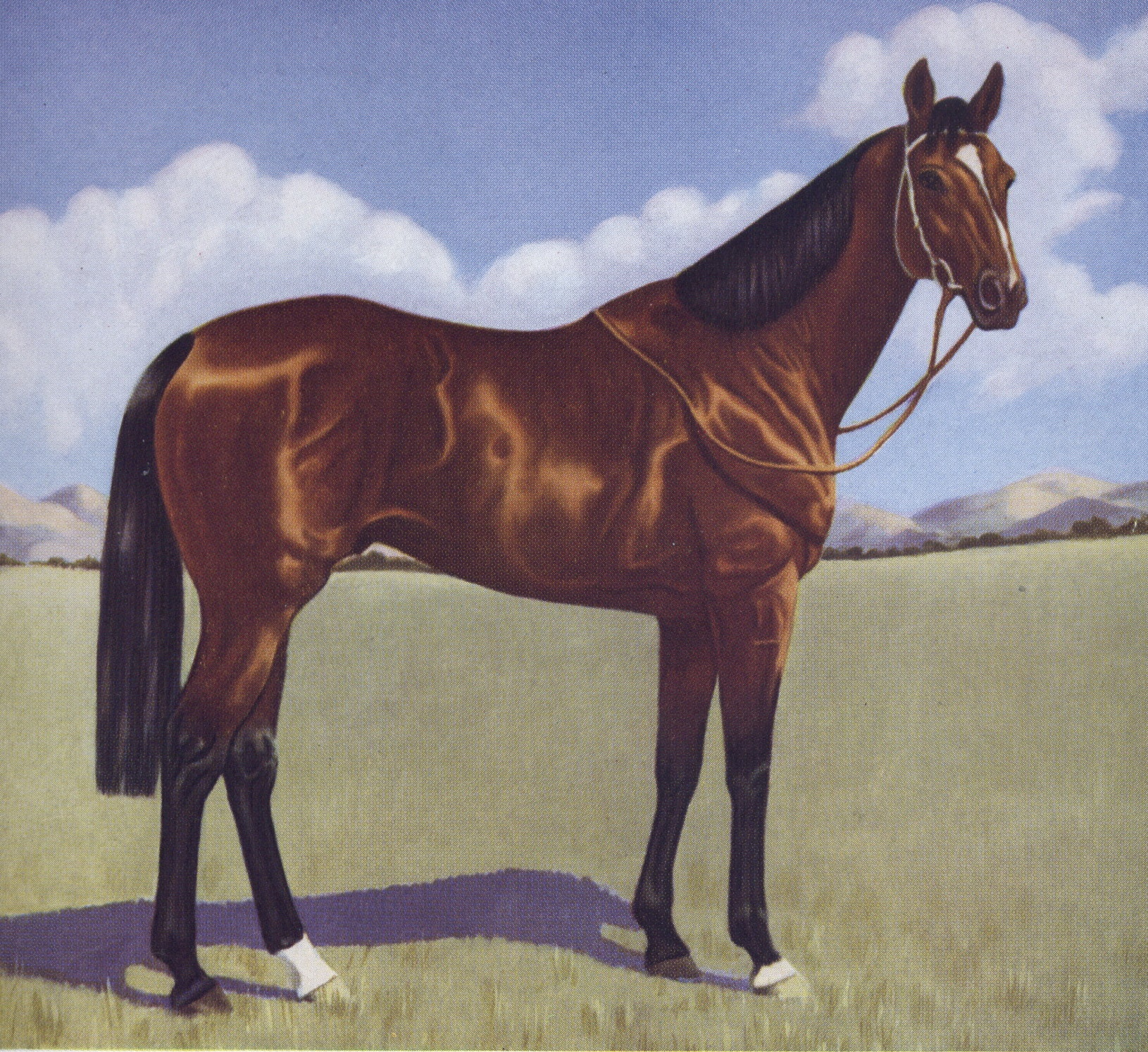
Shannon was one of the top horses bred at Kia-Ora Stud

The Kia Ora Stud is a Thoroughbred horse stud situated near Scone in the Hunter Valley, New South Wales. Percy Miller purchased the cattle property Kia-Ora from the established Segenhoe Stud in 1914 and from there developed the Kia Ora Stud.

By 1917, the stud was able to offer two yearlings at the Sydney Easter Sales; the start of a sustained and most remarkable breeding record. At the 1941 Sydney Easter Sales, 105 yearlings were offered on behalf of the stud. The total of yearlings presented for sale between 1917 and 1949 was 2,862.

The Kia Ora Stud has produced foals which have won seven Melbourne Cups. Among the many horses that have been born and reared here are: Amounis, Evening Peal, Shannon, Delta, Hydrogen and Windbag. The stud sold the A$2 million Redoute's Choice–Procrastinate yearling at the Inglis Easter sale in 2007.

Some of the stallions that stood there were the Australian champions: Baguette, Gunsynd, Midstream and Delville Wood.

Kia Ora had a series of owners, including Percy Miller and his family (until c.1959), George Ryder and John Clift before being sold again in 2000.
