= Shannon Stakes =

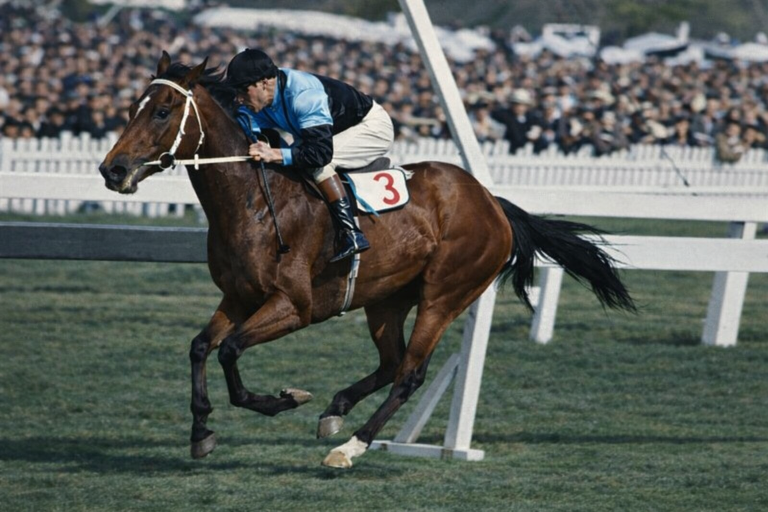
- Shannon and Darby Munro
- Class: Group 2
- Location: Rosehill Racecourse, Sydney, Australia
- Inaugurated: 1978
- Race type: Thoroughbred
- Sponsor: Canadian Club (2025)

Race information
- Distance: 1,500 metres
- Surface: Turf
- Track: Right-handed
- Qualification: Horses three years old and older
- Weight: Quality handicap
- Purse: A$300,000 (2025)
- Bonuses: Winner exemption from a ballot on the Epsom Handicap

The Shannon Stakes is an Australian Turf Club Group 2 Thoroughbred quality handicap horse race, for horses aged three years old and older, over a distance of 1500 metres, held annually at Rosehill Racecourse, Sydney, Australia in September.

== History ==
The race is named for the outstanding Australian Hall of Fame horse Shannon, who raced in the 1940s and was sold to US interests and won the Hollywood Gold Cup.

=== Name ===
- 1978–1997 - Shannon Quality Handicap
- 1998 onwards - Shannon Stakes

=== Grade ===
- 1978–1984 - Principal race
- 1985–2000 - Group 3
- 2001 onwards - Group 2

=== Distance ===
- 1978–1990 – 1500 metres
- 1991 - 1550 metres
- 1992–2000 - 1500 metres
- 2001 - 1400 metres
- 2002 onwards - 1500 metres

=== Venue ===
- 1978–1990 - Rosehill Racecourse
- 1991 - Canterbury Park Racecourse
- 1992 onwards - Rosehill Racecourse

== Winners ==
The following are past winners of the race.

- 2025 - Waterford
- 2024 - Amor Victorious
- 2023 - Cepheus
- 2022 - Surf Dancer
- 2021 - Yonkers
- 2020 - I Am Superman
- 2019 - Mister Sea Wolf
- 2018 - Noire
- 2017 - Washington Heights
- 2016 - Moral Victory
- 2015 - Vashka
- 2014 - Rock Sturdy
- 2013 - Rain Drum
- 2012 - Rolling Pin
- 2011 - King Lionheart
- 2010 - Firebolt
- 2009 - Drumbeats
- 2008 - Musket
- 2007 - †race not held
- 2006 - Stormhill
- 2005 - Lotteria
- 2004 - Nips
- 2003 - Sportsman
- 2002 - Gordo
- 2001 - On Type
- 2000 - Al Mansour
- 1999 - Referral
- 1998 - Armed For Action
- 1997 - Quick Flick
- 1996 - Juggler
- 1995 - Sprint By
- 1994 - Play Or Pay
- 1993 - Soho Square
- 1992 - Palatin
- 1991 - Deposition
- 1990 - Go Bush
- 1989 - Cole Diesel
- 1988 - Never Quit
- 1987 - Never Quit
- 1986 - Drawn
- 1985 - Double Dandy
- 1984 - Eastern Bay
- 1983 - Gelsomino
- 1982 - Dalmacia
- 1981 - Prince Pherozshah
- 1980 - Star Dancer
- 1979 - Stylee
- 1978 - For All Seasons

† Not held because of outbreak of equine influenza

== See also ==
- Colin Stephen Quality Handicap
- Golden Pendant
- Golden Rose Stakes
- List of Australian Group races
- Group races
