= Supercopa de España (disambiguation) =

The Supercopa de España is an annual Spanish football competition.

Supercopa de España or Spanish Super Cup may also refer to:

- Supercopa de España de Baloncesto, basketball
- Supercopa de España de Balonmano or Supercopa ASOBAL, handball
- Supercopa de España de Futsal, futsal
- Supercopa de España de Hockey Patines, roller hockey
- Supercopa de España de Rugby, rugby
- Supercopa de España de Voleibol, volleyball
- Supercopa de España de Waterpolo, water polo
- Supercopa de España Femenina, women's football
- Supercopa de España de Baloncesto Femenino, women's basketball

== See also ==
- Copa del Rey (disambiguation)
