= Queen's Cup (horse race) =

Australian horse race

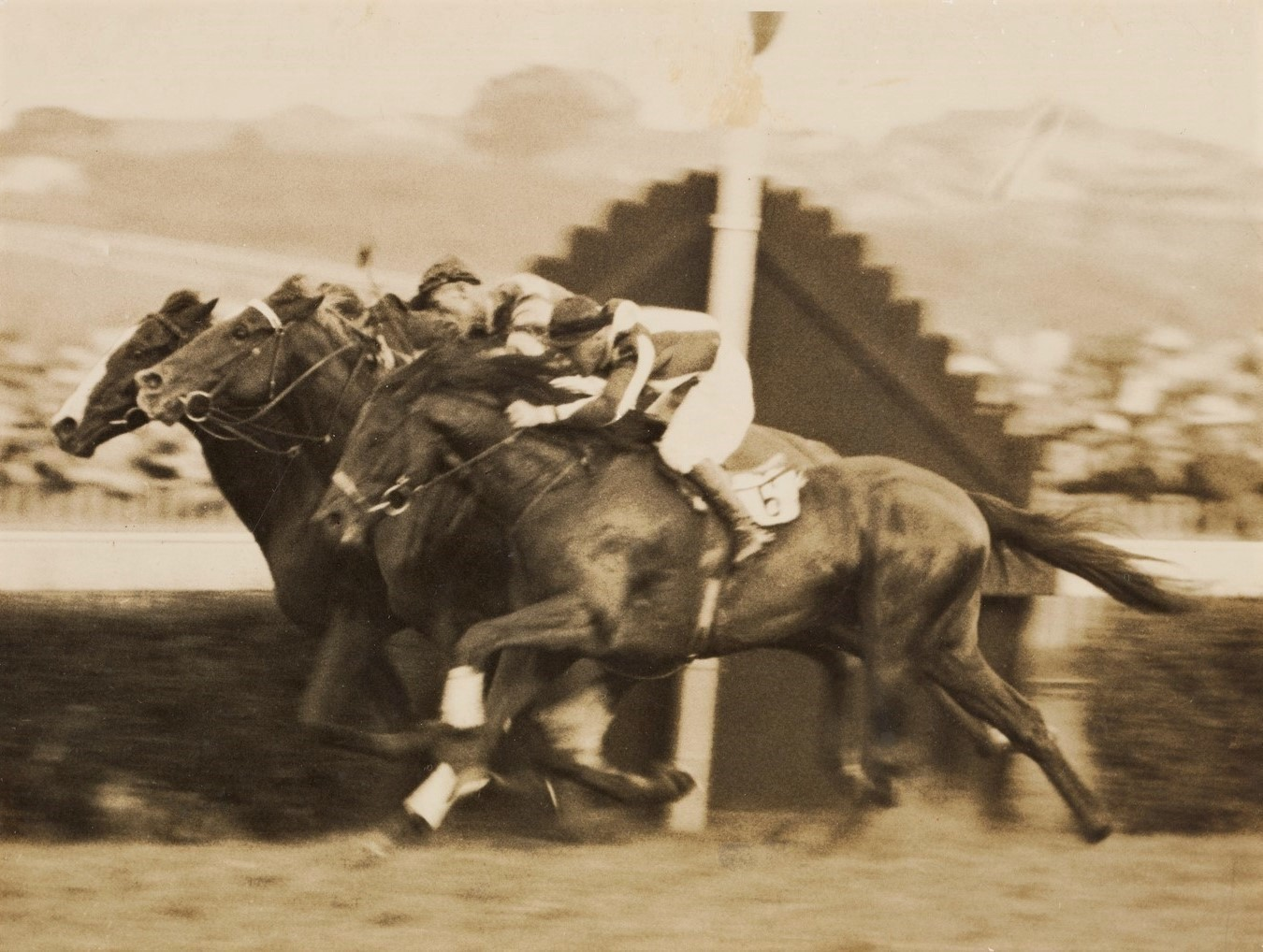
- 1934 King's Cup; Rogilla def Peter Pan
- Class: Group 3
- Location: Various, across Australia
- Inaugurated: 1827; 199 years ago
- Race type: Thoroughbred – Flat racing

Race information
- Distance: 2,600 m (1 mi 1,083 yd)
- Surface: Turf
- Weight: Handicap
- Purse: Varies

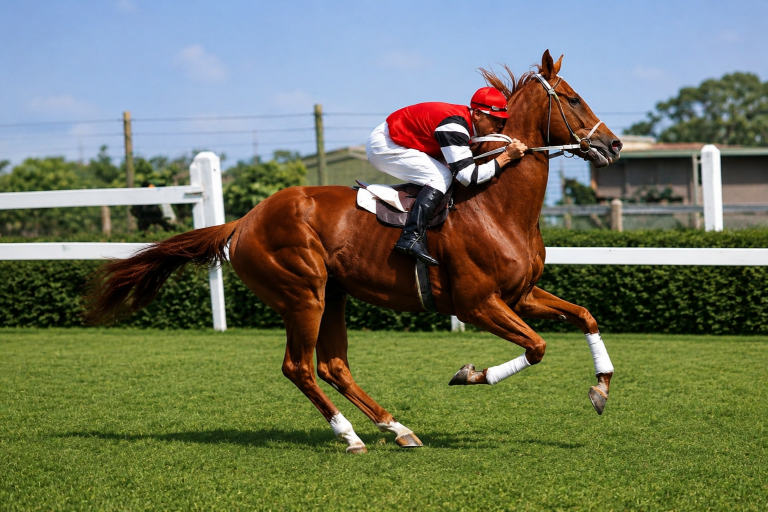
Phar Lap, 1930 winner

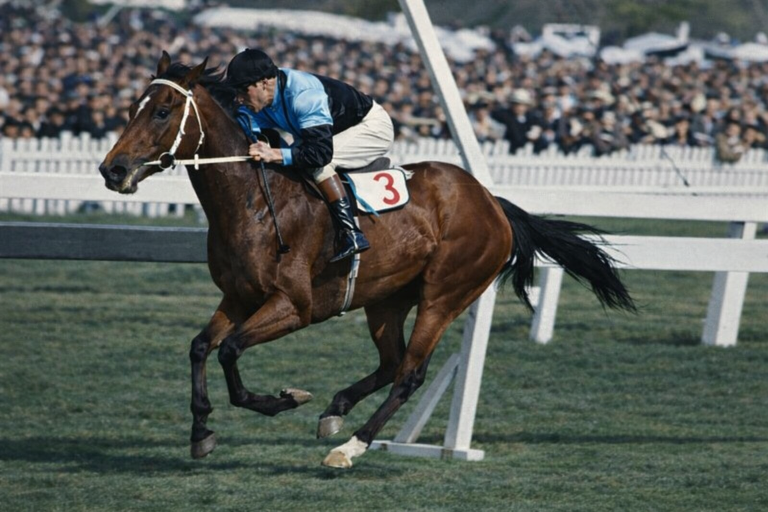
Shannon, 1946 winner

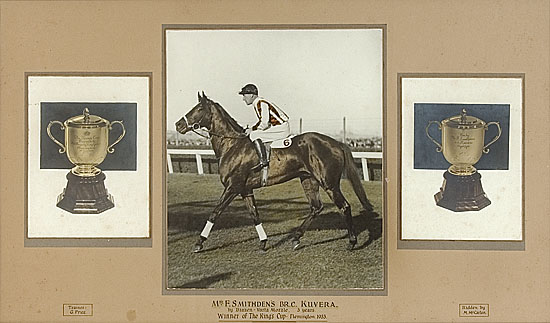
Kuvera, 1933 winner

The Queen's Cup, formerly King's Cup, is a horse race run in different locations across Australia from 1927 in most years until the present day. It was originally held in each of the six states of Australia in rotation each year, but has not been held in strict rotation in recent decades. The length of the race varies but is between 2,400 m (1.5 mi) and 2600m. Since the 1990s it has been a Group 3 race.

== History ==
The King's Cup was first run in 1927, inaugurated by the King of the United Kingdom and Dominions, King George V, to celebrate the visit to Australia of the then Duke and Duchess of York (later George VI and Queen Elizabeth the Queen Mother). The king would provide the trophy each year. The conditions of the race stated that the race should be run in a different state in rotation each year, and hosted by that state's jockey club. The rotation was to be hosted in this order: Victoria, New South Wales, Queensland, South Australia, Western Australia, and Tasmania, with the first race in Victoria. The participating jockey clubs decided that it should be a weight-for-age race (a Group 1 race). The race was especially prestigious in the years before World War II.

The inaugural race in 1927 was won by Spear Maiden at Flemington Racecourse in Melbourne. The first trophy was presented by George V's son, then Duke of York, later King George VI, when he was in Australia to open the first Federal Parliament at Canberra.

In May 1951, Shannon, ridden by Darby Munro won the race at Randwick Racecourse in Sydney.

On the death of George V, George VI advised that he would continue to provide the trophy for the race. The race lapsed after the death of George VI in February 1952, but in April that year the Australian Jockey Club in Sydney received permission to run a Queen's Cup. Queen Elizabeth II would continue the tradition, providing the trophy, with a prize worth £2000.

The first newly-renamed Queen's Cup was run at Randwick Racecourse, Sydney, as part of the spring carnival, on Saturday 11 October 1952, hosted by the AJC. The race was run over 12 furlongs (1.5 mi) under quality handicap conditions. In a surprise win, outsider Salamanca, ridden by 19-year-old Aboriginal jockey Merv Maynard, beat the two favourites, champion horses Hydrogen and Dalray, both ridden by experienced jockeys, Keith Nuttal and Darby Munro. Maynard's only regret was that he did not get to meet the then Princess Elizabeth, later Queen Elizabeth II, who was, with husband Prince Philip, Duke of Edinburgh, scheduled to hand out the trophies at the event. However, en route to their Australian engagements, the couple were visiting several African countries, and it was there that they received the news of the death of her father, George VI, so they had to return to England. The young princess would remember the win, however, and on a state visit forty years later asked to be introduced to Maynard.

In August 1953, Euphrates beat Hydrogen and set a Queensland race record, at Eagle Farm Racecourse, Brisbane

In March 1954: Sir Coral, at Morphettville Racecourse, Adelaide, won the race in the presence of the Queen and Prince Philip, Duke of Edinburgh.

It continued to be run in rotation until around 1985, when it appears to have been run at Randwick in that year and then again in 1988. It was run at Morphettville Racecourse in Adelaide, South Australia, until 1990, when it was run at Cheltenham Park Racecourse (described as "a new race in Adelaide called the Queen's Cup" by The Canberra Times), where it was also referred to as the SAJC Queen's Cup.

In 1992 the Queen's Cup, run in February at Randwick, was referred to as a A$100,000 Group 3 race, run over 2,000 m (1.2 mi). The winning horse was Aquidity, trained by Tommy Smith, and Queen Elizabeth, who presented the trophies, and the Duke of Edinburgh were in attendance.

In 1993 the race was run at in October at Flemington, worth A$58,000 and run over 2,500 m (1.6 mi). It was again referred to as a Group 3 race.

Since 2000 the race has continued to be run in rotating venues, but not held in 2009 or 2014, and with breaks in 2020 and 2021 owing to the COVID-19 pandemic in Australia. In 2022 it was held by the Australian Turf Club on 19 March at Rosehill Gardens Racecourse in western Sydney, entitled "Queen's Cup (N E Manion Cup)" (2,400 m (1.5 mi)).

== 1934 racebook ==
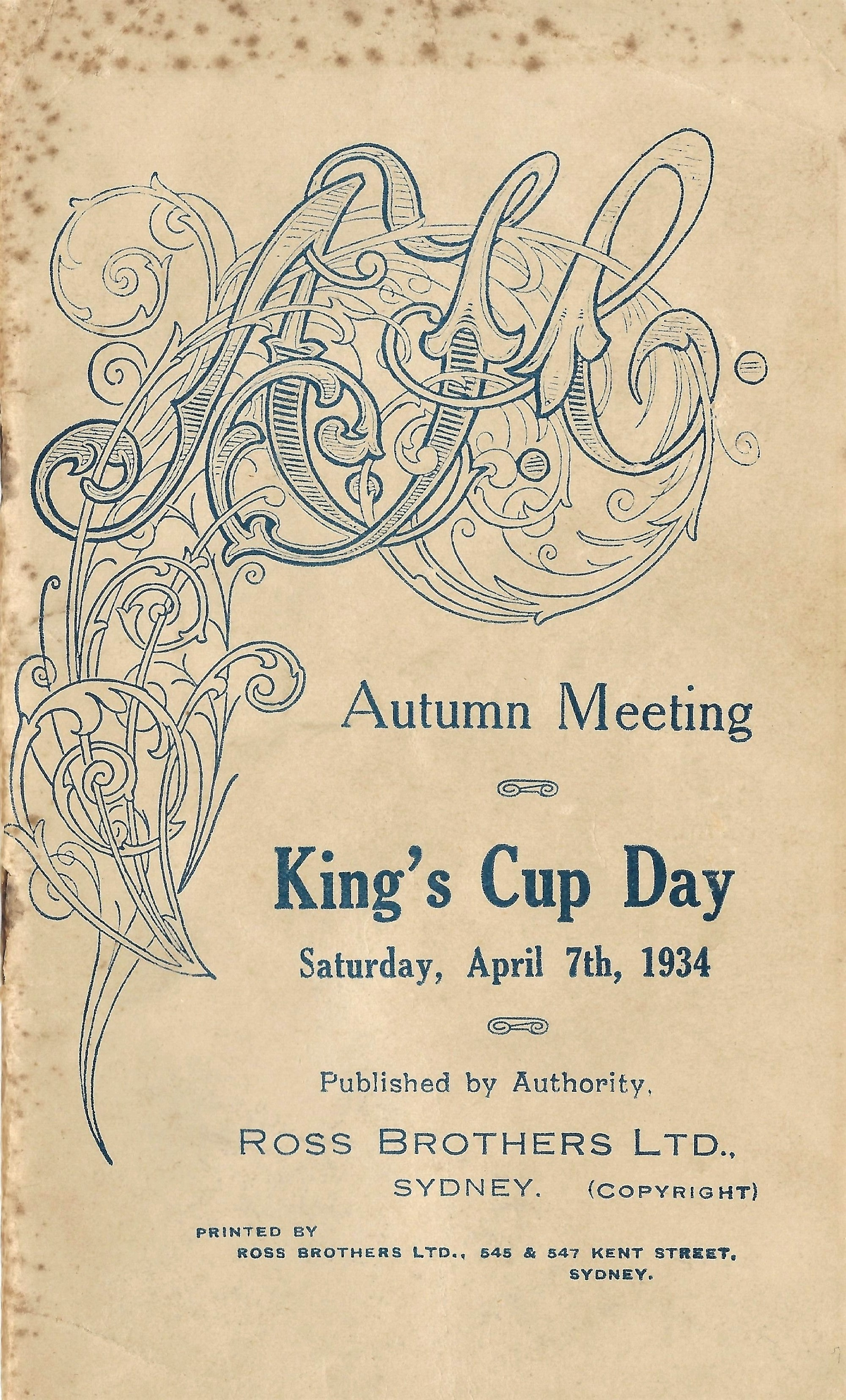
1934 AJC Kings Cup racebook front cover

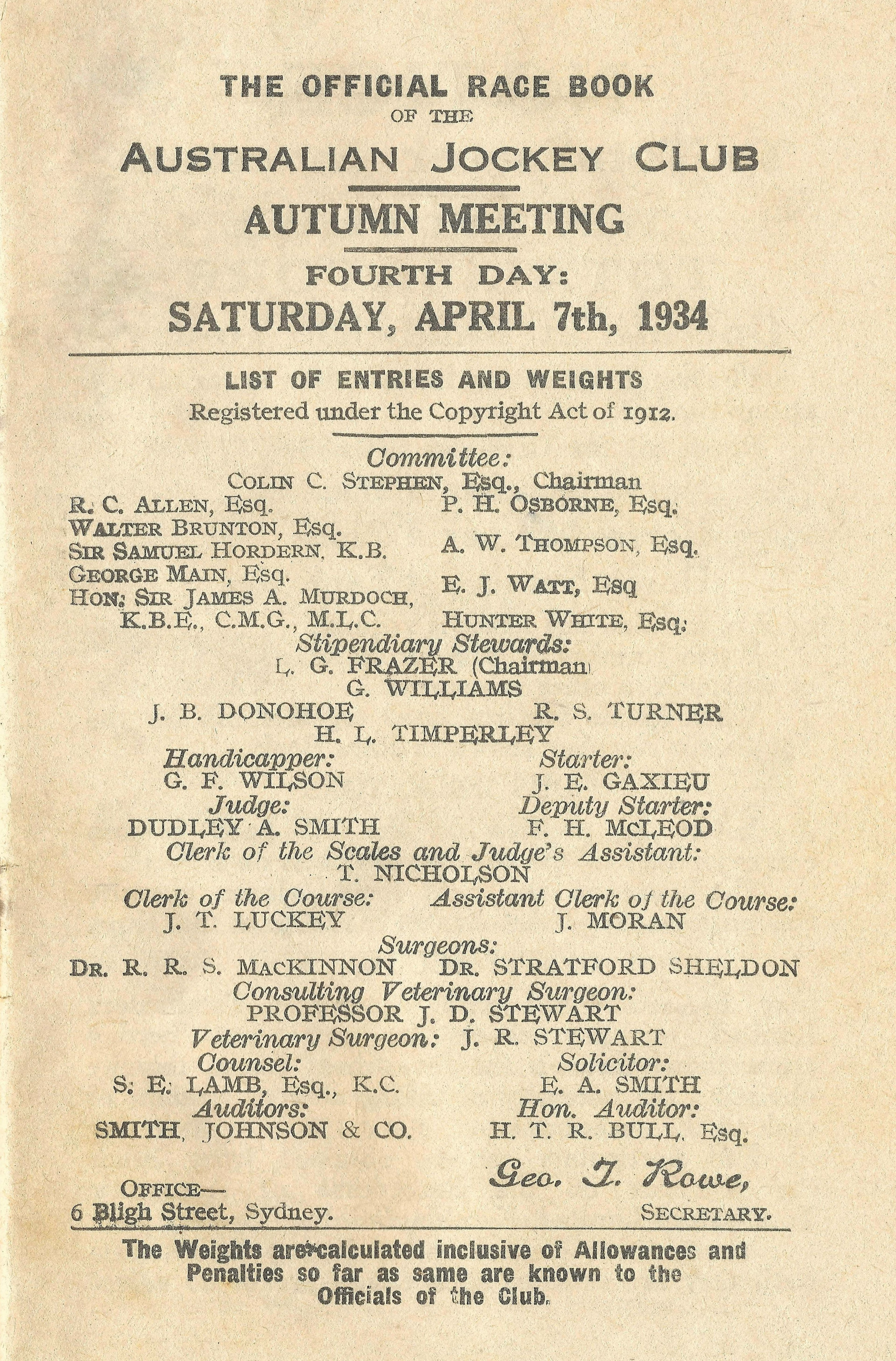
1934 AJC Kings Cup showing raceday officials

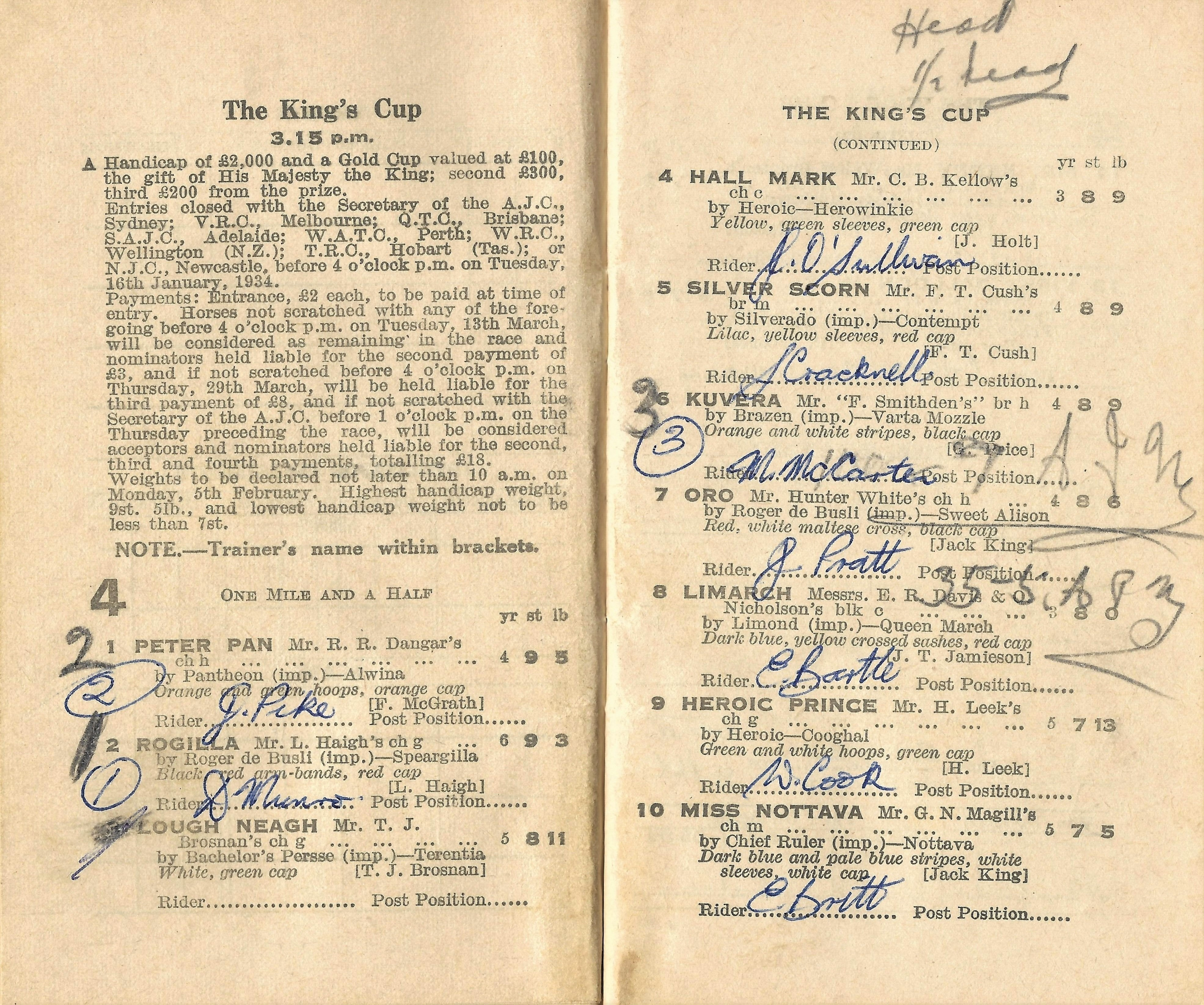
1934 AJC Kings Cup showing the winner, Rogilla

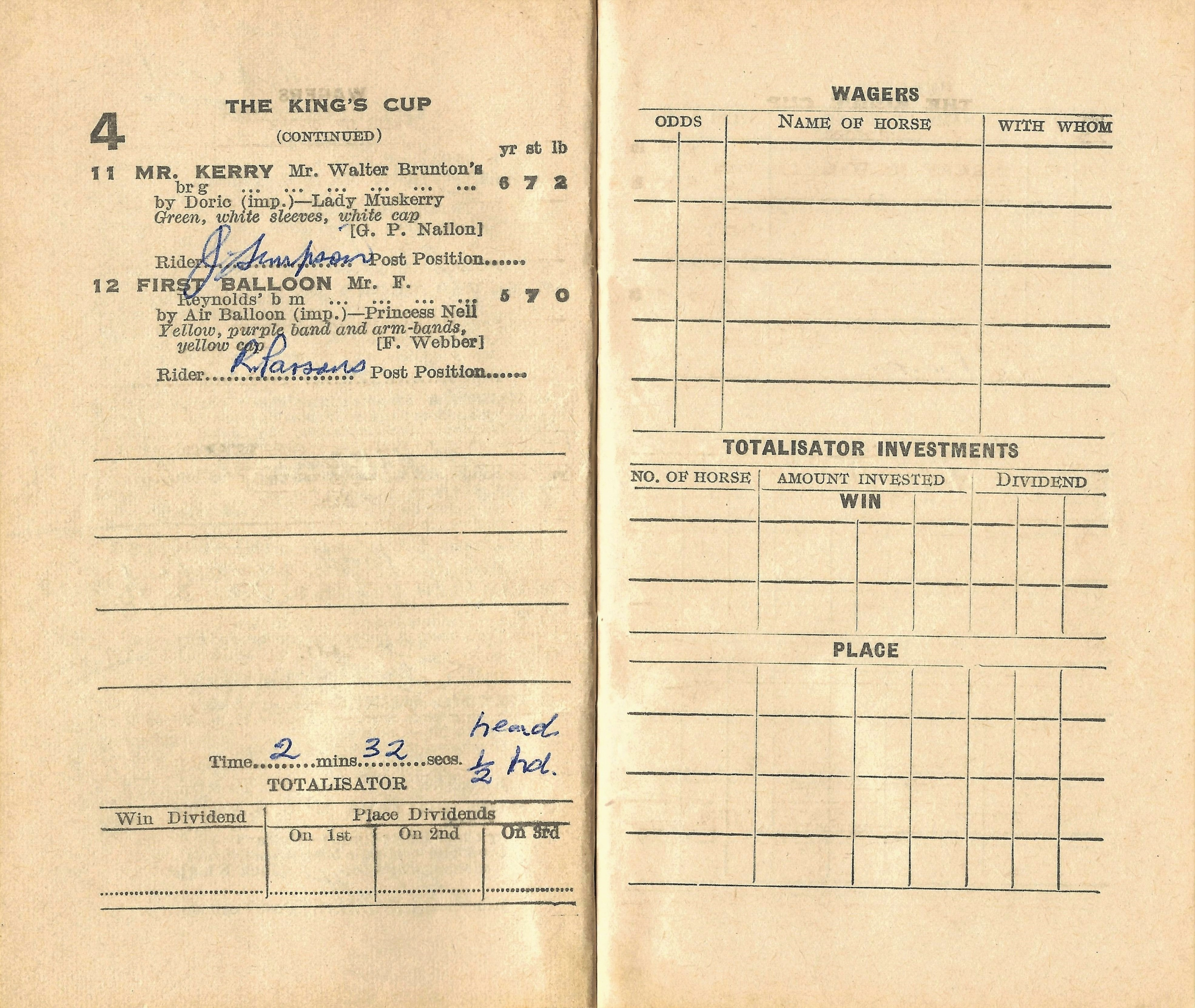
1934 AJC Kings Cup starters and results

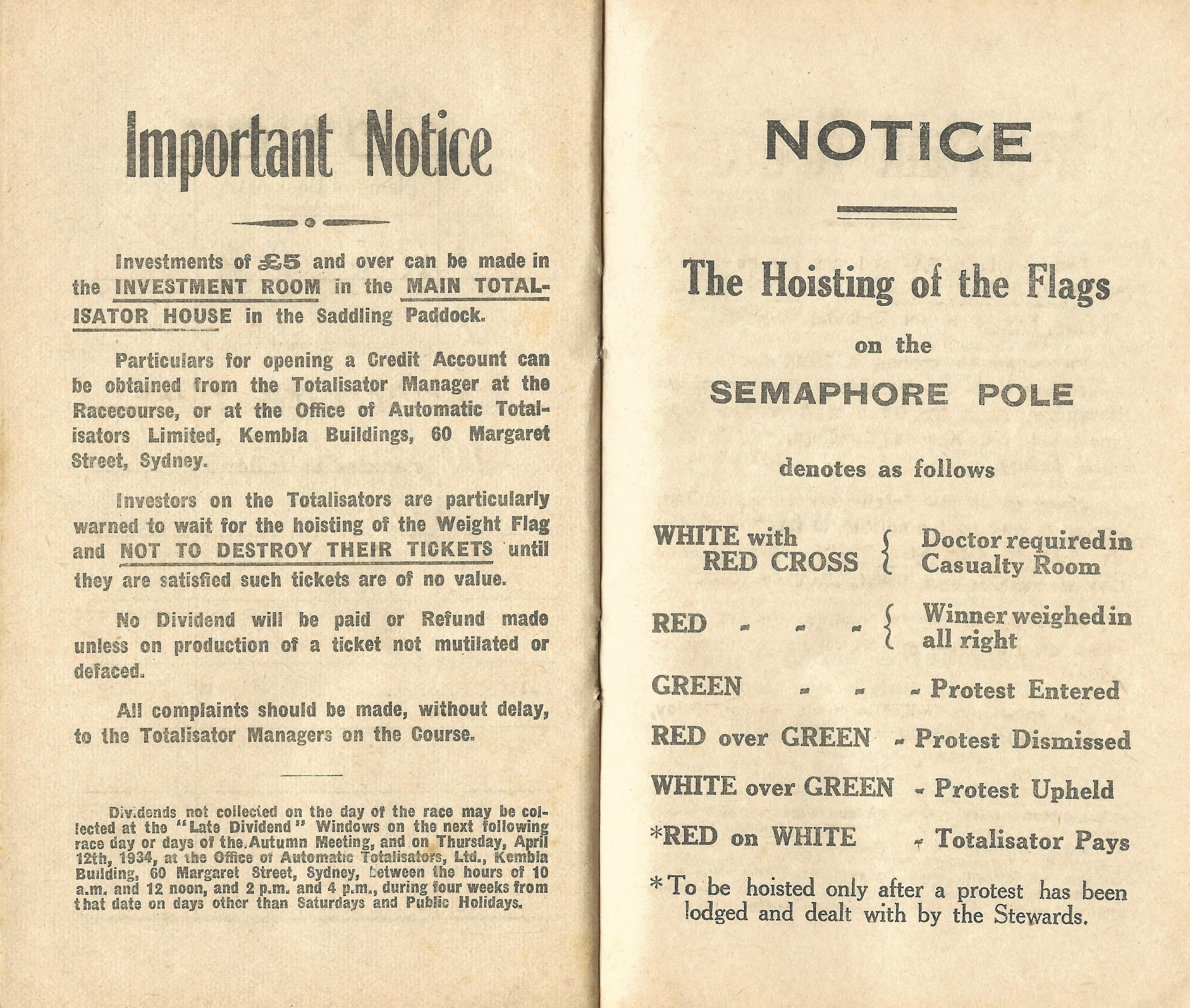
1934 AJC Kings Cup showing hoisting of the flags

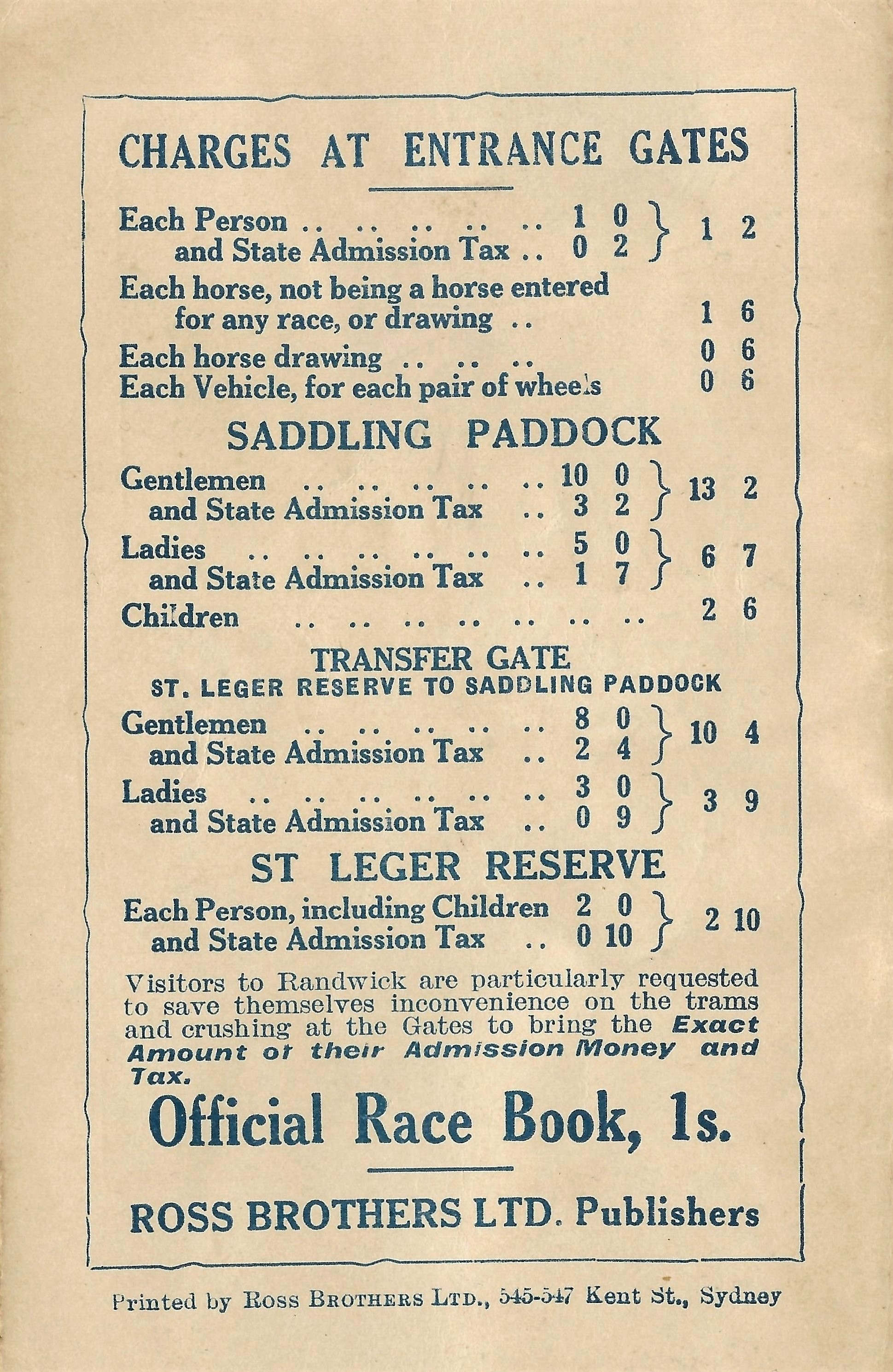
Back cover showing charges at the entrance gates

== 1948 and 1954 racebooks ==
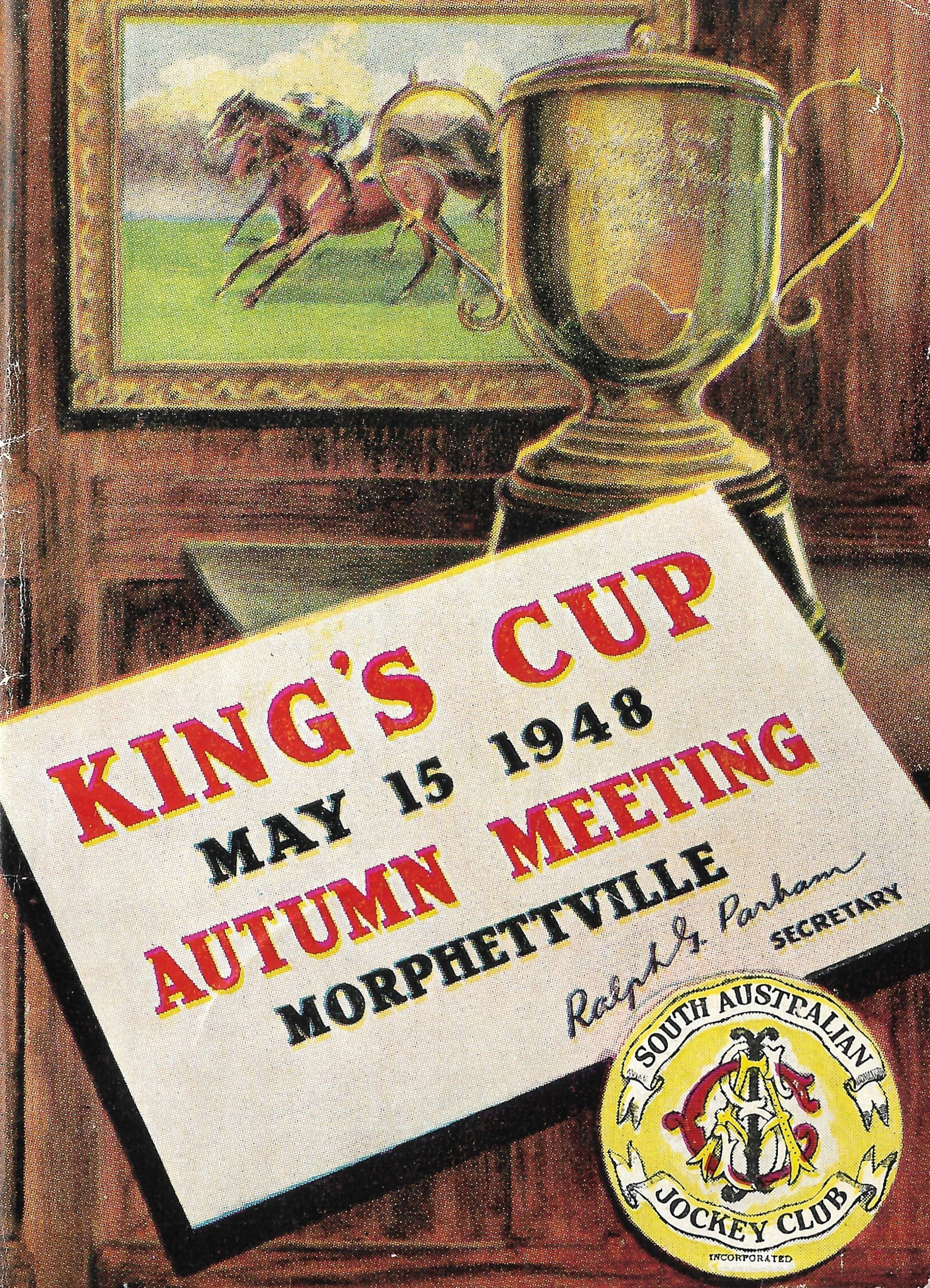
1948 SAJC Kings Cup racebook front cover

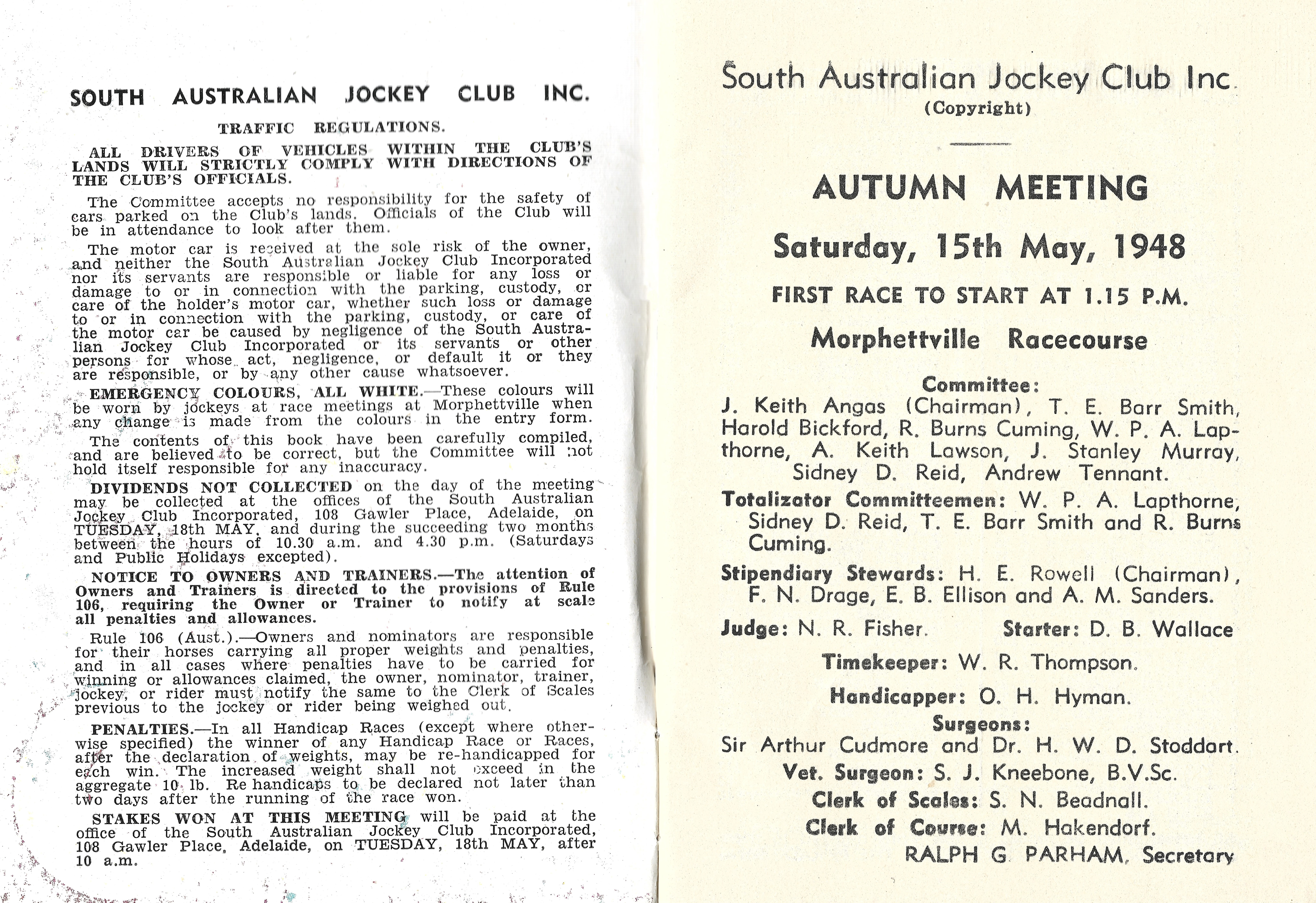
1948 SAJC Kings Cup showing raceday officials

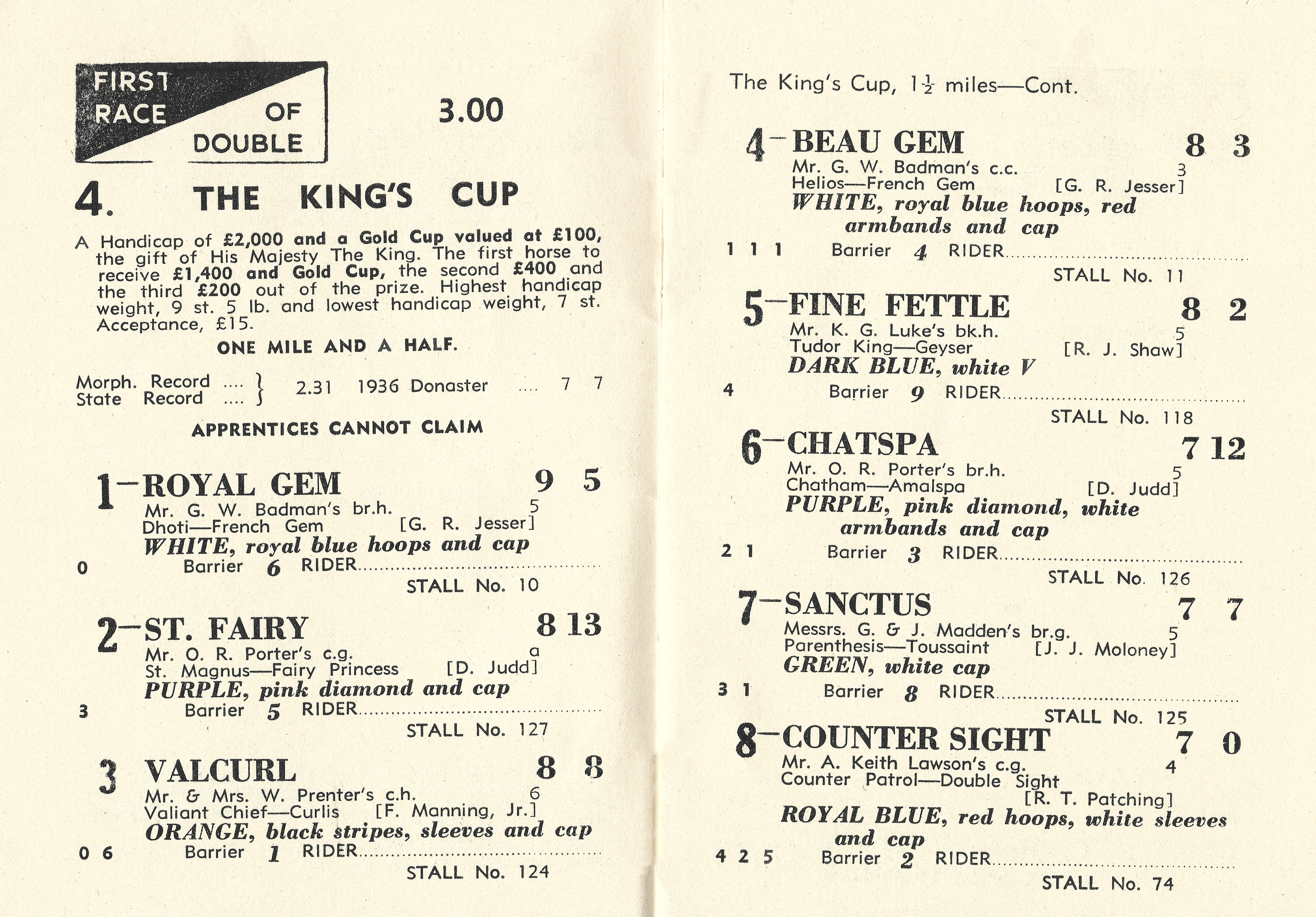
1948 SAJC Kings Cup showing the winner, Valcurl

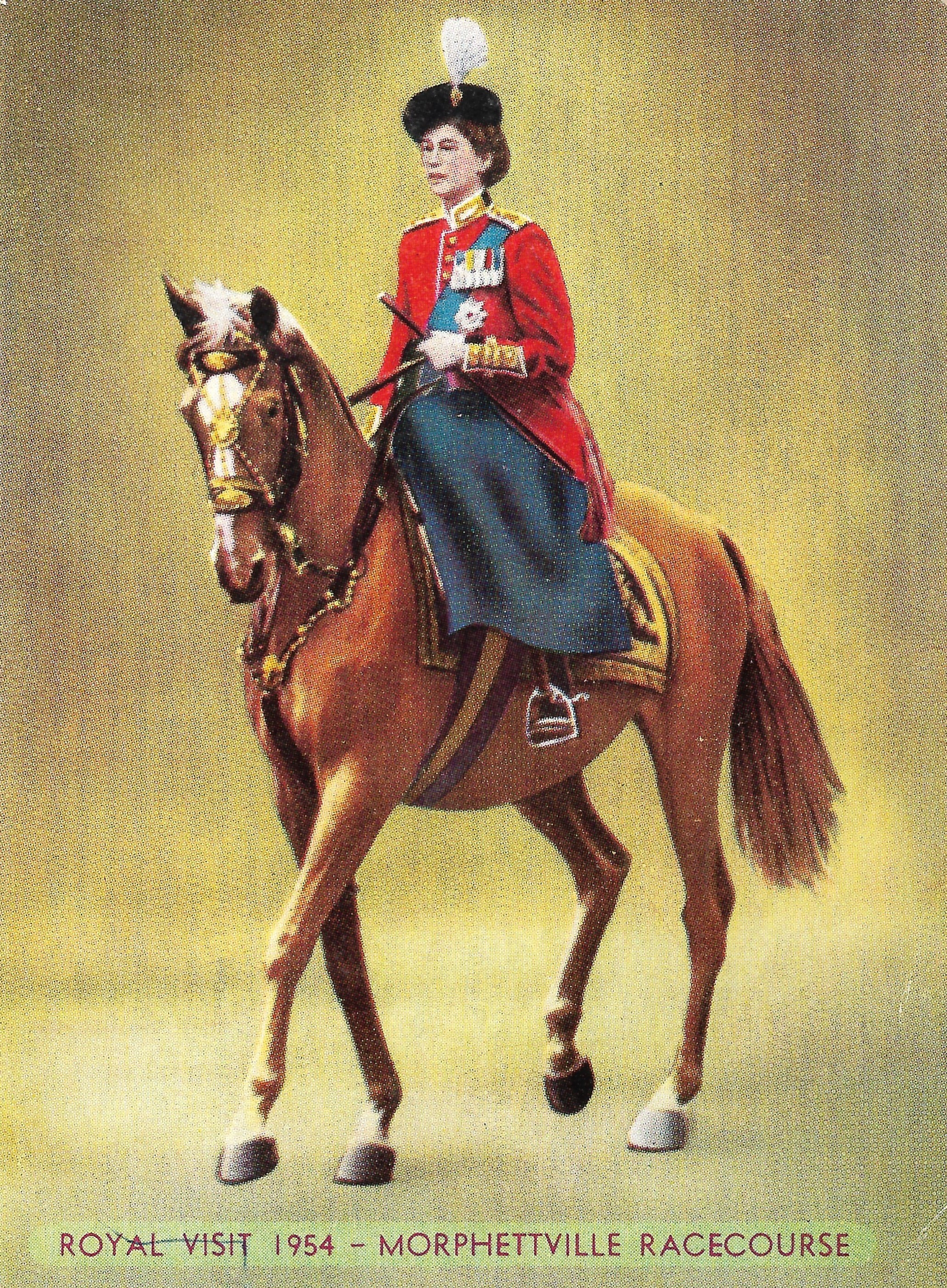
1954 SAJC Queens Cup racebook front cover

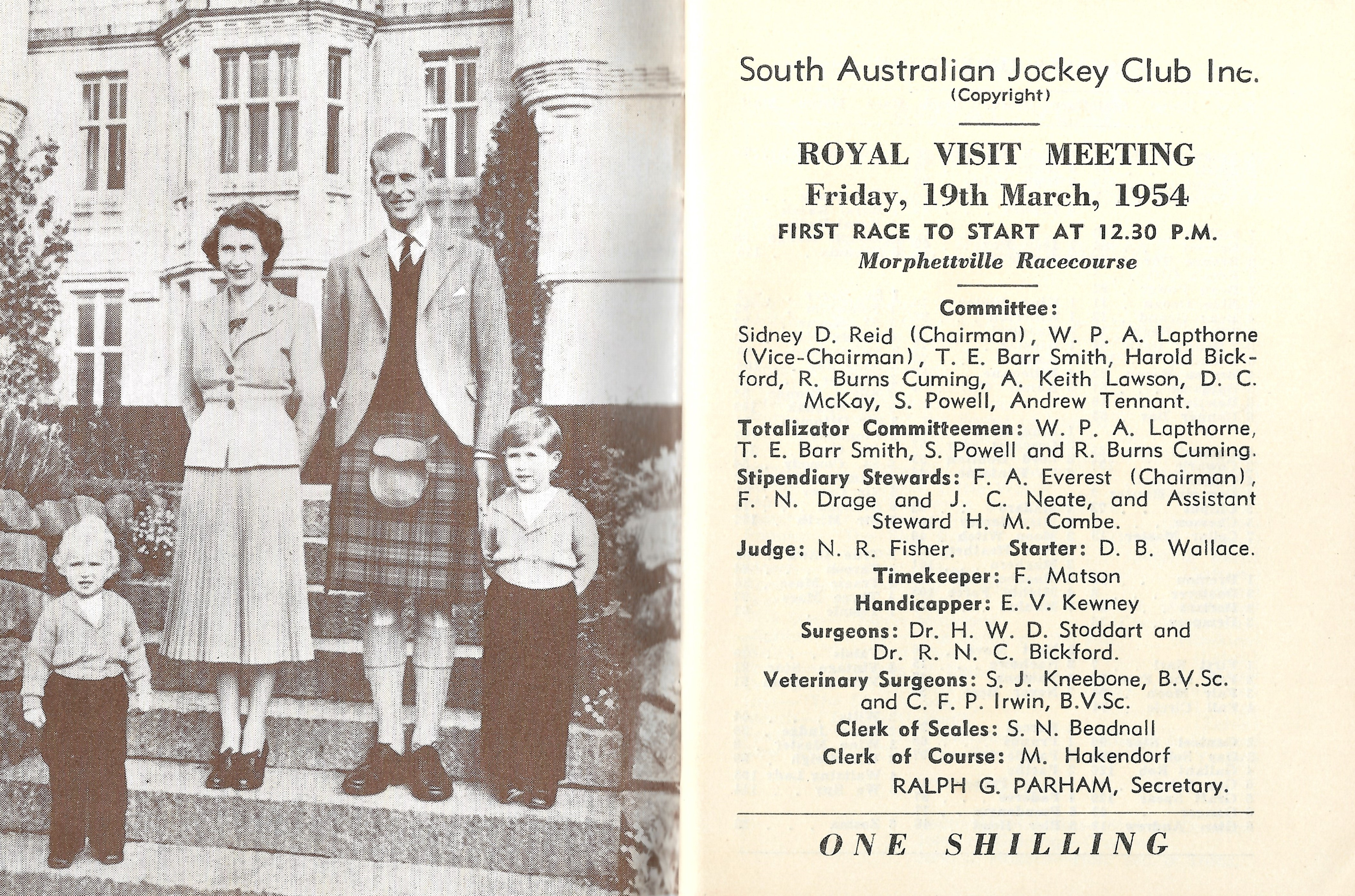
1954 SAJC Queens Cup showing raceday officials

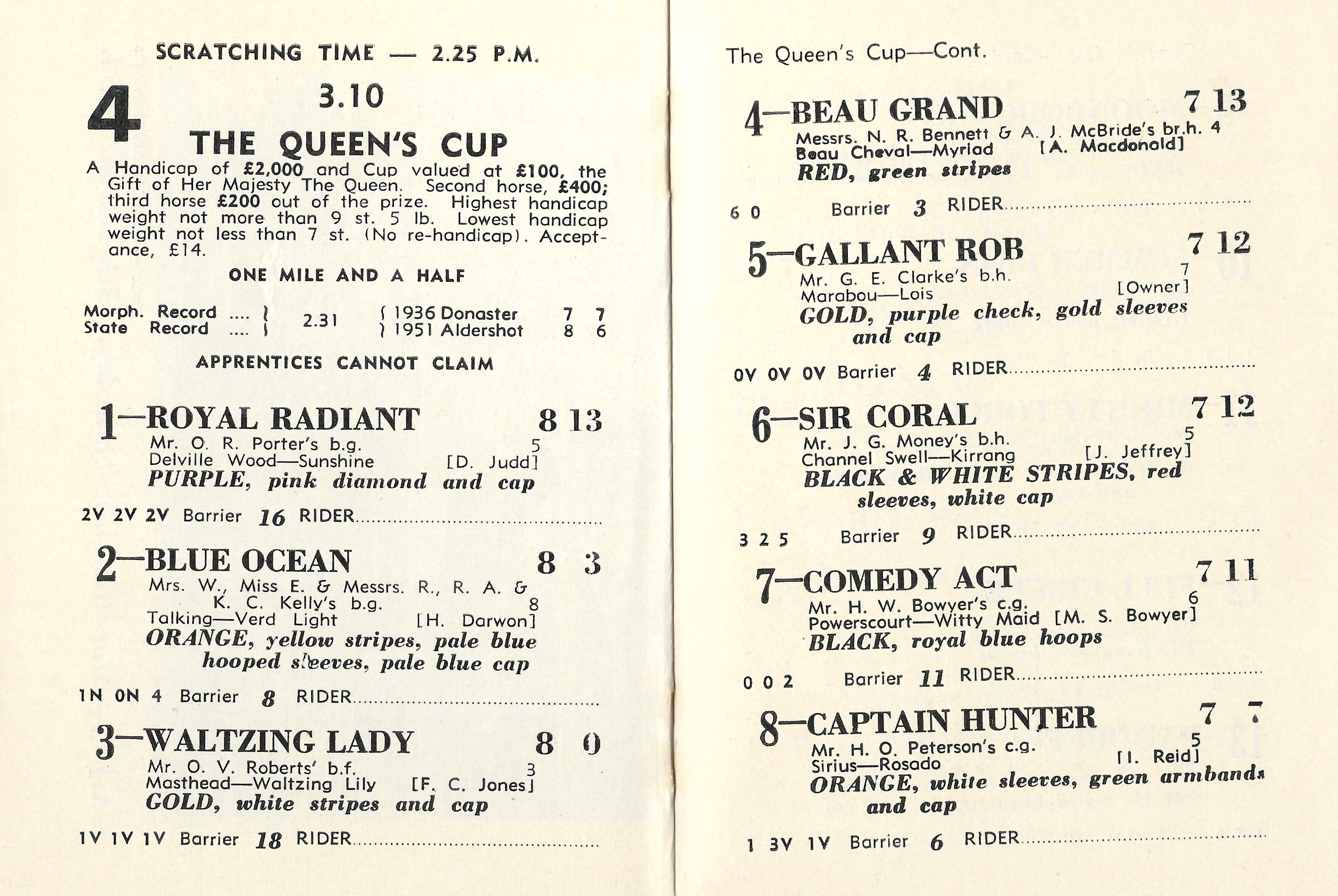
1954 SAJC Queens Cup showing the winner, Sir Coral

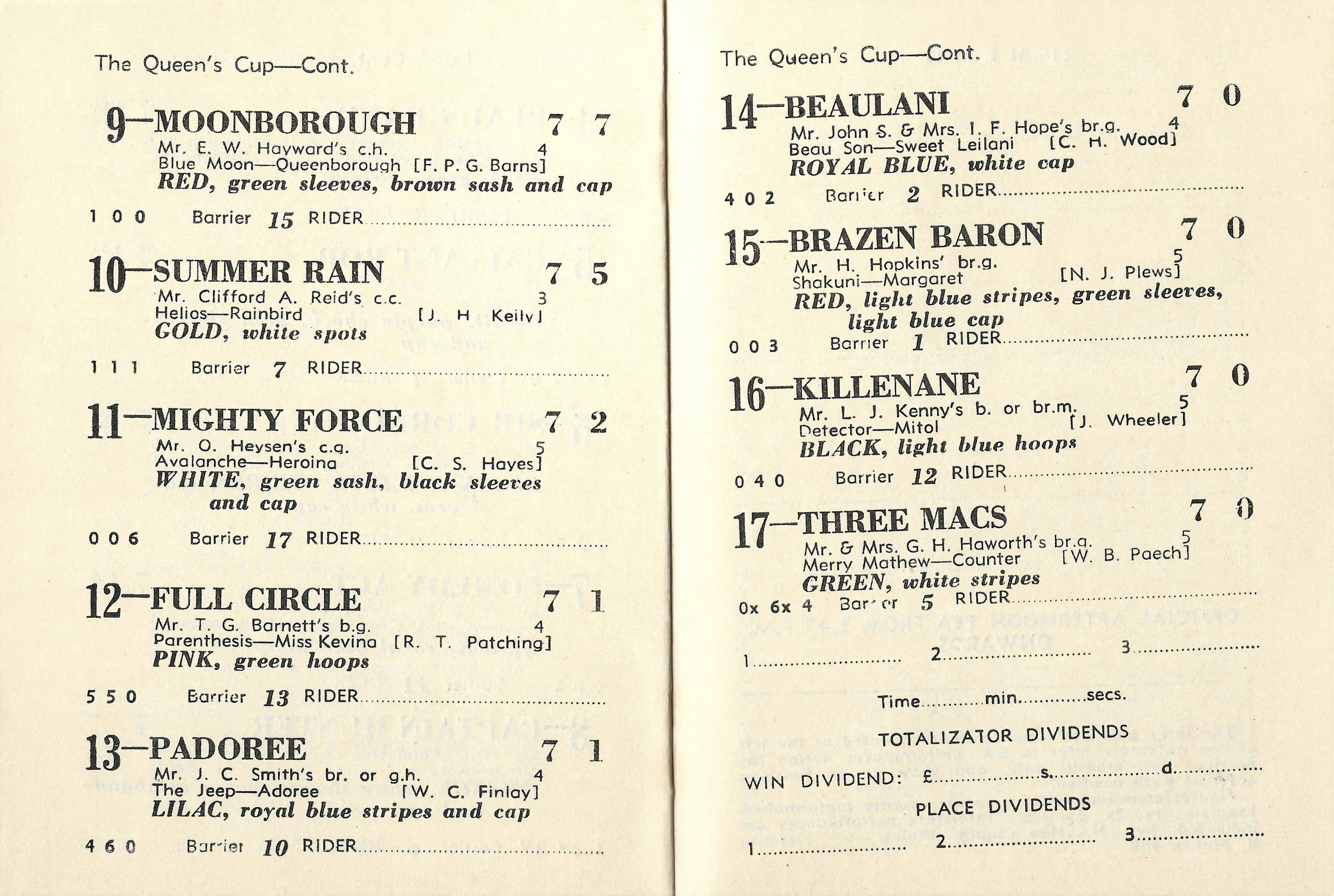
1954 SAJC Queens Cup starters and results

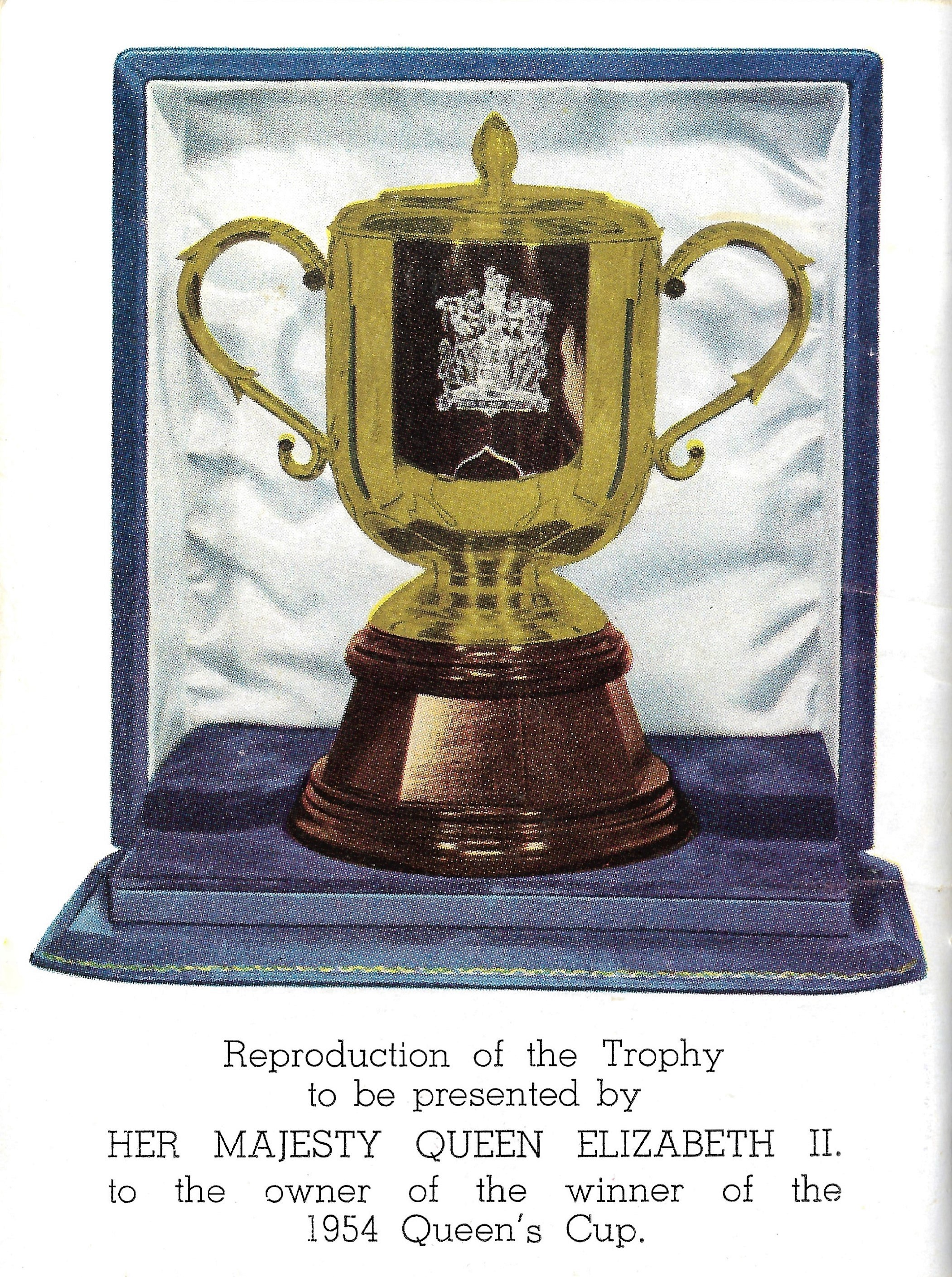
The 1954 Queens Cup trophy

== Selected dates and winners ==
=== King's Cup ===
- 1927: Spear Maiden
- 1928: Limerick
- 1929: Valparaiso
- 1930: Phar Lap
- 1931: Roseburn
- 1932: Second Wind
- 1933: Kuvera
- 1934: Rogilla
- 1935: Serlodi
- 1936: Donaster
- 1937: Tetbury
- 1938: Debater
- 1939: Marauder
- 1940 - 1945 Not Run
- 1946: Shannon
- 1947: Falcon Knight
- 1948: Valcurl
- 1949: Royal Academy
- 1950: Chatspa
- 1951: Durham, at Flemington

=== Queen's Cup ===
- 1952: Salamanca
- 1953: Euphrates beat Hydrogen
- 1954: Sir Coral, at Morphettville Racecourse, Adelaide
- 1955: Priandy, at Perth, WA
- 1956: Dunsinane, at Launceston Racecourse, Tasmania
- 1957: Sir William, at Flemington, Melbourne
- 1958: McDougall, at Randwick, Sydney
- 1968: Robins Boy, at Mowbray, Launceston
- 1984: Colonial Flag, at Morphettville, Adelaide
- 1985: Chelaware, at Randwick
- 1986: Exdirectory, at Elwick
- 1989: Miss Remus, at Eagle Farm Racecourse, Brisbane
- 1990: Raslaan,
- 1992: Aquidity, at Randwick
- 1993: Toll Bell, at Flemington
- 1995: Full Suit, at Eagle Farm, Brisbane
- 1996: Navajo Flash / Slygo Connection, at Morphettville
- 2000: Yippyio
- 2001: Gillespie, at Eagle Farm, Brisbane
- 2003: Bellton, at Cheltenham Park, Adelaide
- 2004: Dundally, at Belmont Park Racecourse, Perth
- 2005: Midnight Escapade, at Launceston
- 2006: Demerger
- 2007: Ice Chariot
- 2008: Tayllaroo, at Cheltenham Park, Adelaide
- 2010: Gondorff
- 2011: Syreon
- 2012: Spechenka
- 2013: Motivado
- 2015: Real Love
- 2015/6: Dandino
- 2016/7: Allergic, at Rosehill Gardens Racecourse, Sydney
- 2017/8: Plot Twist, at Sunshine Coast, Queensland
- 2018/9: Valac, at Morphettville, Adelaide
- 2021/2 (N E Manion Cup): No Compromise, at Rosehill Gardens, Sydney
- 2022/23: Soulcombe, at Flemington, Melbourne, Victoria
- 2023/24: The Map, at Morphettville, Adelaide, South Australia
