= Hydrogen (horse) =

Australian-bred Thoroughbred racehorse

- Hydrogen and Arthur Ward
- Sire: Delville Wood (GB)
- Grandsire: Bois Roussel (FR)
- Dam: Sweet Sound (AUS)
- Damsire: Magpie (GB)
- Sex: Stallion
- Foaled: 1948
- Country: Australia
- Colour: Brown
- Breeder: Percy Miller Kia Ora Stud
- Owner: E.R.Williams
- Trainer: Ted Hush
- Record: 60:26-8-9
- Earnings: £59,444

Major wins
- Hobartville Stakes (1951); Rosehill Guineas (1951); Craven Plate (1951,1952); Caulfield Guineas (1951); Victoria Derby (1951); VRC St Leger Stakes (1952); AJC St Leger (1952); Hill Stakes (1952,1953); Cox Plate (1952,1953); C.B.Fisher Plate (1952,1953); Alister Clark Stakes (1953); P.J. O'Shea Stakes (1953); Brisbane Cup (1953); Mackinnon Stakes (1953); St George Stakes (1953); Colin Stephen Stakes (1953); AJC Randwick Plate (1953); VRC Queens Plate (1953)

Honours
- Australian Racing Hall of Fame
- Last updated on 1 February 2026

Hydrogen was a champion Australian thoroughbred racehorse.

By the imported stallion Delville Wood (who also sired Melbourne Cup winner Evening Peal) he was foaled in 1948 and was trained throughout his career by Ted Hush.

Hydrogen failed by a neck of being the first horse to win three Cox Plates when beaten in 1951 as a three-year-old. He won the subsequent two editions of the race in 1952 and 1953.

At three-years-old, he developed into one of Australia’s finest weight-for-age performers and the highest stakes earner at the time eclipsing the record previously held by Phar Lap.

A winner over six furlongs (1,200m) to two miles (3,200m) he won many major races including the 1951 Caulfield Guineas, 1951 Victoria Derby, 1951 Rosehill Guineas, 1951 Craven Plate, the 1952 and 1953 Cox Plate, 1953 LKS Mackinnon Stakes and the 1953 Brisbane Cup.

He was retired to stud in 1954.

Owner E.R Williams was a founding part owner of the Woolworths retail chain in Sydney 1924 and was known in racing as the man with the 'Midas Touch' also owned Pride of Egypt, Lord Forrest and Forest Beau. E.R.Williams died in March 1961

Trainer Ted Hush originally was a strapper for Newcastle trainer Alf Inkpen also rode as a jockey in the western districts of New South Wales. Major race winners in Abspear 1943 Sydney Cup and Dewar 1943 Tramway Handicap bringing Hush into prominence at Randwick with other major winners being Russia 1946 Melbourne Cup, Pride of Egypt 1954 Victoria Derby and Caranna 1955 AJC Derby. Hush died in February 1957.

Hydrogen's racing record: 60 starts for 26 wins, 8 seconds, 9 thirds and 17 unplaced runs.

== Image gallery ==
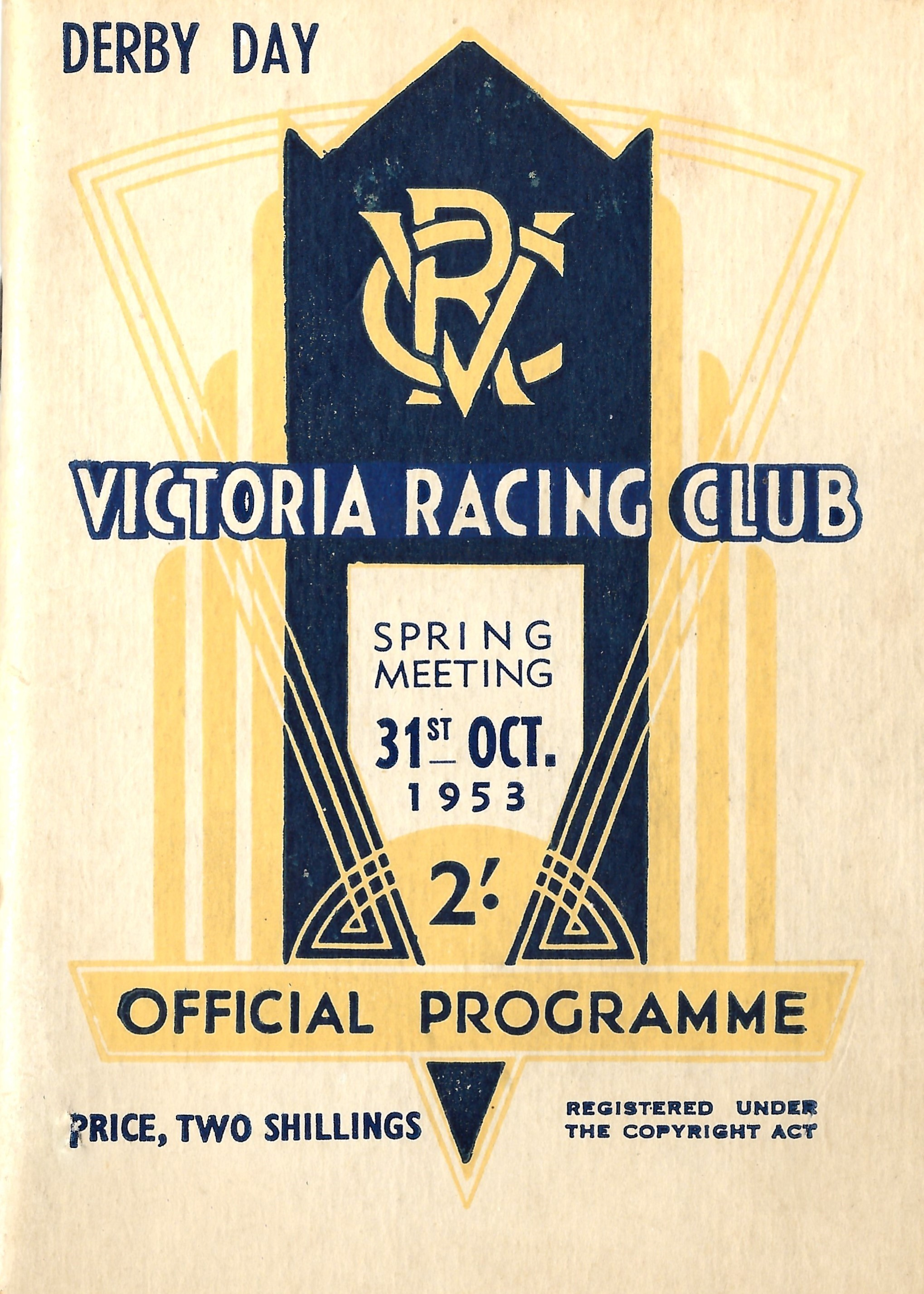
1953 VRC Derby racebook front cover

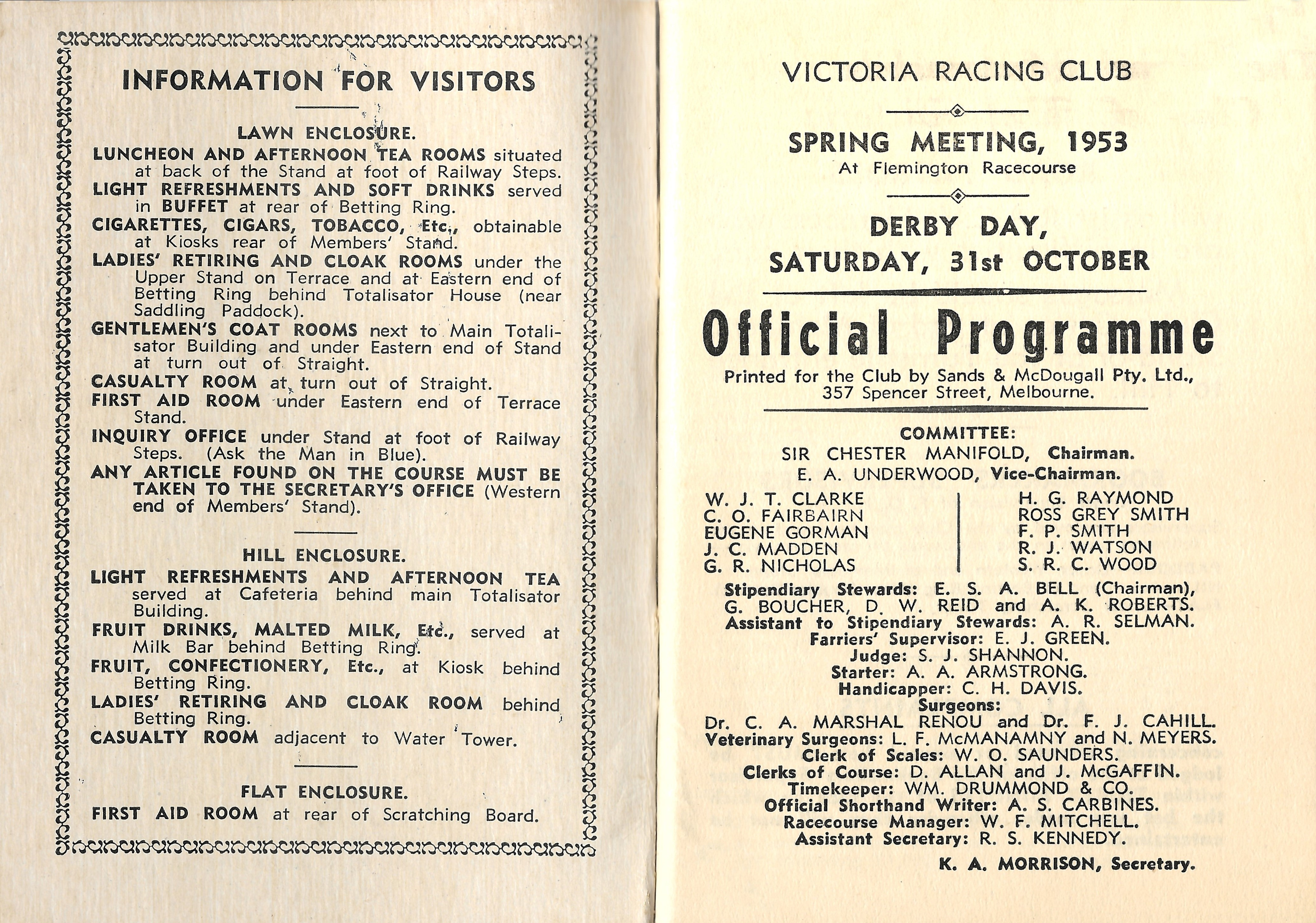
1953 VRC Derby raceday officials

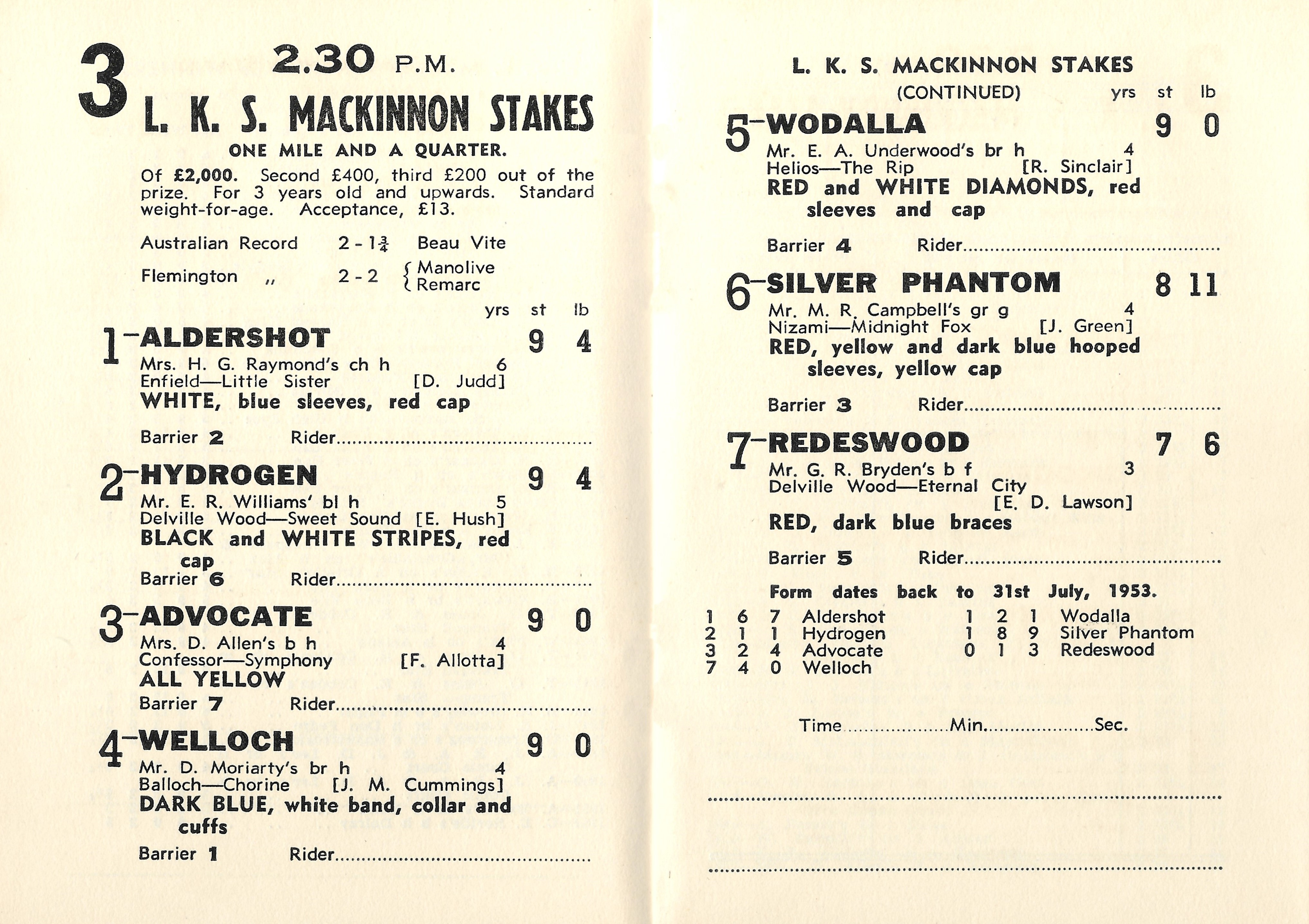
1953 LKS Mackinnon Stakes page showing the winner, Hydrogen

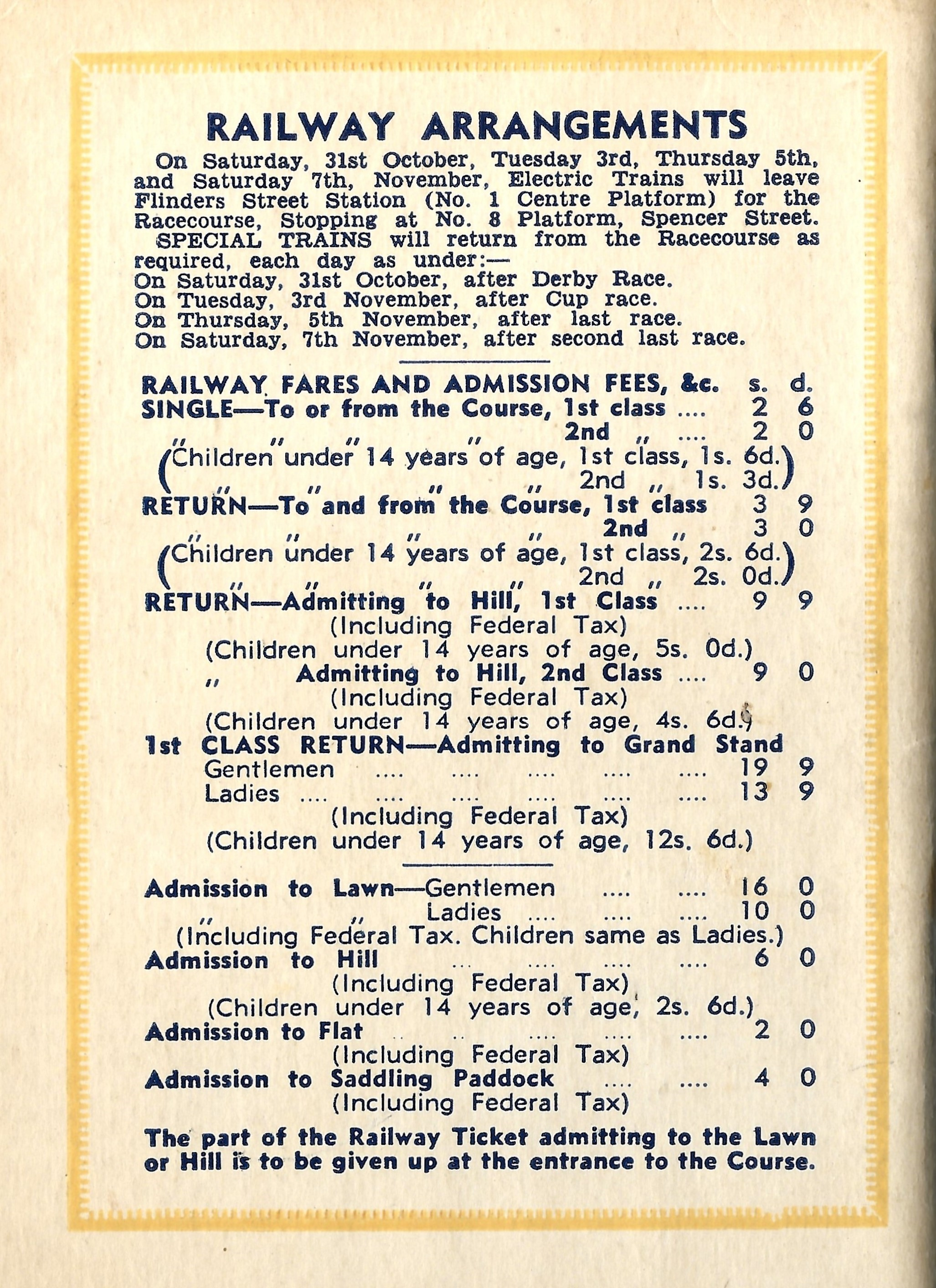
Back cover showing enclosure information for visitors

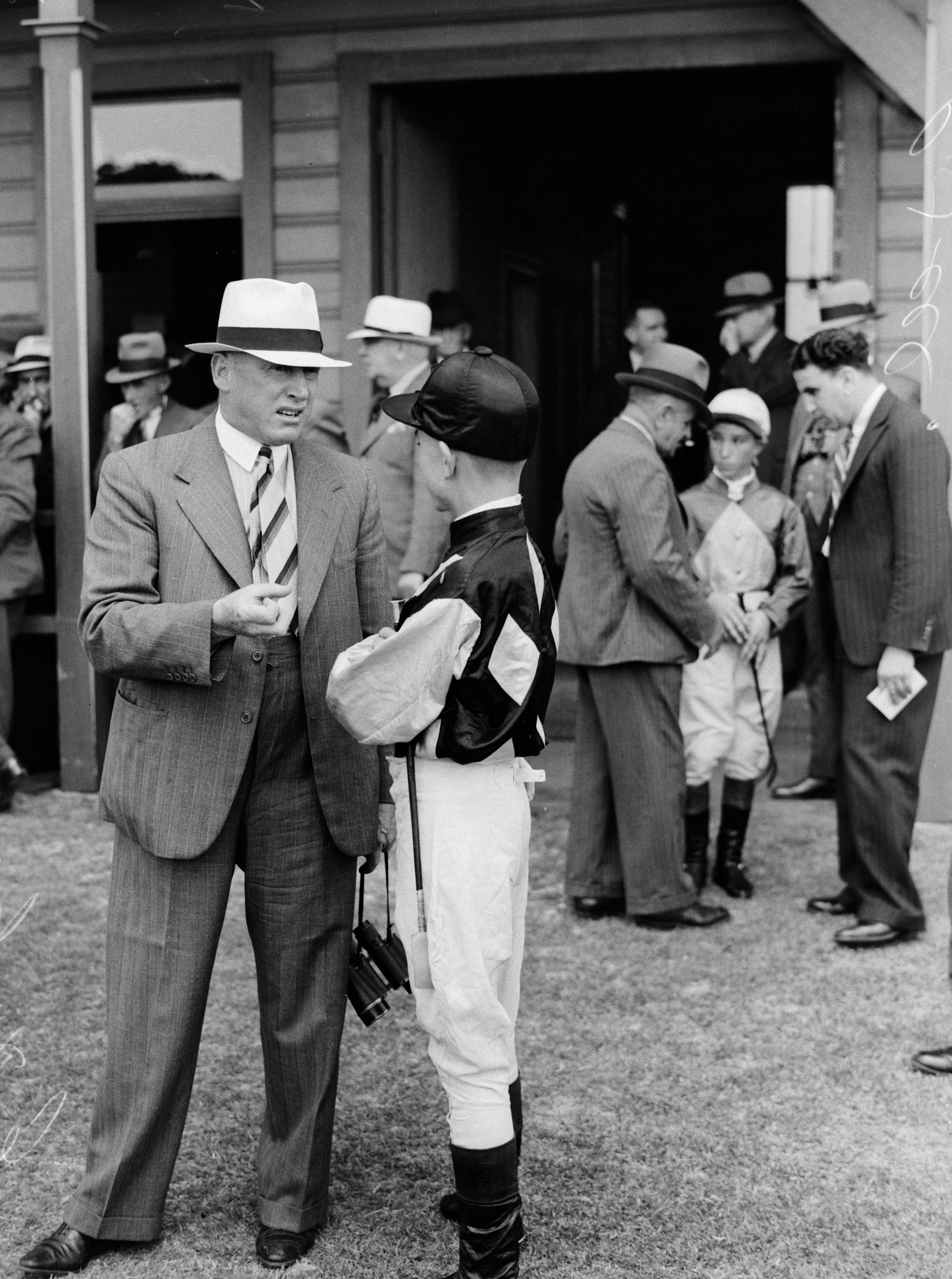
Ted Hush trainer at Kensington Racecourse
