= Copa del Rey (disambiguation) =

The Copa del Rey is a football competition held in Spain.

Copa del Rey may also refer to:

- Copa del Rey de Baloncesto, Spain's basketball cup
- Copa del Rey de Voleibol, Spain's volleyball cup
- Copa del Rey de Balonmano, Spain's handball cup
- Copa del Rey de Waterpolo, Spain's water polo cup
- Copa del Rey de Futsal, Spain's futsal cup
- Copa del Rey de Rugby, Spain's rugby union cup
- Copa del Rey de Hockey Patines, Spain's rink hockey cup
- Copa del Rey de Hockey Hierba, Spain's field hockey cup
- Copa del Rey Juvenil de Fútbol, Spain's U19 football cup
- Copa del Rey de Tenis, ATP tennis exhibition in Spain

== See also ==
- King's Cup (disambiguation)
- Coupe du Roi, a Spa24 title
- Serie del Rey, the championship series of the Mexican Baseball League
