= Summer Cup (ATC) =

Horse race in Australia

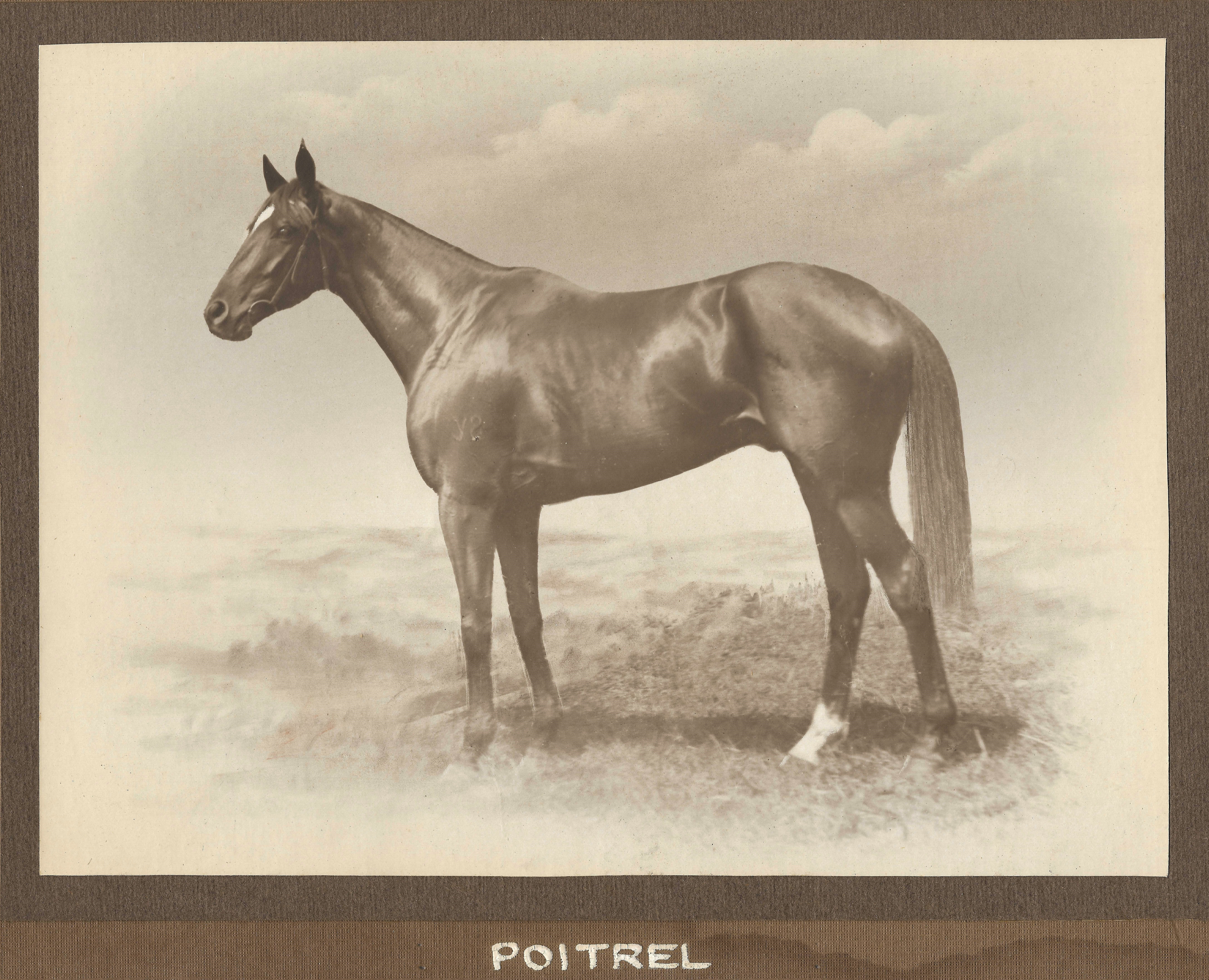
- Class: Group 3
- Location: Randwick Racecourse; Sydney, New South Wales, Australia
- Inaugurated: 1890
- Race type: Thoroughbred – Flat racing
- Sponsor: Yulong (2025)

Race information
- Distance: 2,000 metres
- Surface: Turf
- Track: Right-handed
- Qualification: Three years old and older
- Weight: Quality handicap
- Purse: $250,000 (2025)

The Summer Cup is an Australian Turf Club Group 3 Thoroughbred horse race held as a quality handicap for horses three years old and older and run over a distance of 2000 metres at Randwick Racecourse, Sydney, Australia in late December. The race was first run in 1890.

== History ==
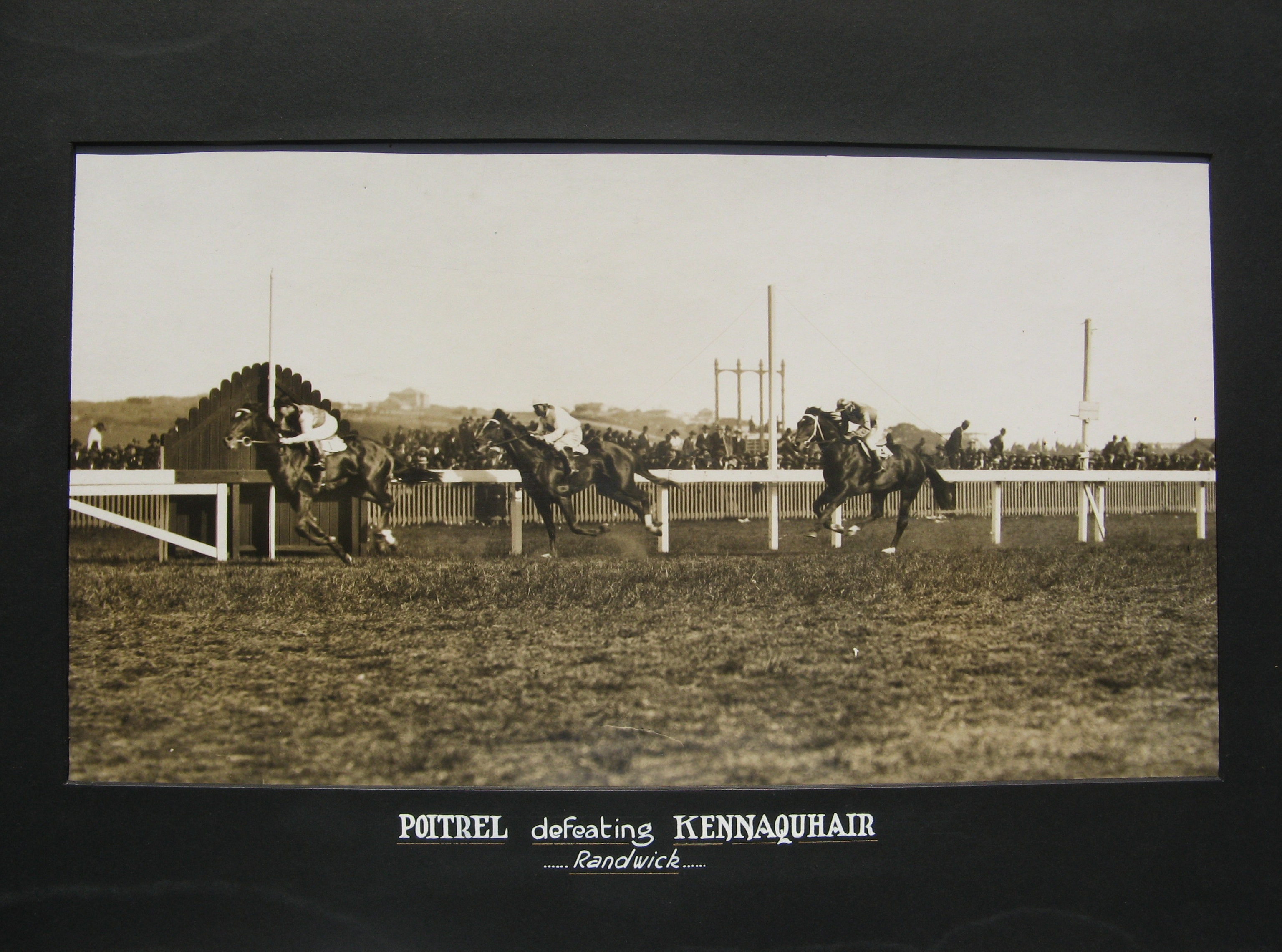
Poitrel, 1917 Winner

=== Distance ===
- 1890–1952 - 1 5/8 miles (~2600 metres)
- 1953–1971 - 1 1/2 miles (~2400 metres)
- 1972–2012 – 2400 metres
- 2013 onwards - 2000 metres

=== Grade ===
- 1890–1978 - Principal Race
- 1979 onwards - Group 3

=== Venue ===
- 2011, 2012 - Rosehill Racecourse

== Winners ==
Past winners of the race are as follows.

- 2025 - Tavi Time
- 2024 - Tavi Time
- 2023 - Lion's Roar
- 2022 - Diamil
- 2021 - Parry Sound
- 2020 - Spirit Ridge
- 2019 - Luvaluva
- 2018 - Fierce Impact
- 2017 - Montauk
- 2016 - Red Excitement
- 2015 - Mighty Lucky
- 2014 - I'm Imposing
- 2013 - I'm Imposing
- 2012 - Le Roi
- 2011 - Yulalona
- 2010 - Spechenka
- 2009 - Solid Billing
- 2008 - Ready To Lift
- 2007 - †race not held
- 2006 - Jamberoo
- 2005 - Aqua D'Amore
- 2004 - This Manshood
- 2003 - Stadium
- 2002 - Stoway
- 2001 - Majestically
- 2000 - Lanolin
- 1999 - Zanetta
- 1998 - Dance Til Dawn
- 1997 - Linesman
- 1996 - Century Boy
- 1995 - Catalan Prince
- 1994 - Spiritual Star
- 1993 - Striking Gold
- 1992 - Mr. Eurostar
- 1991 - Cross Swords
- 1990 - Magnolia Hall
- 1989 - Lord Hybrow
- 1988 - Super Impose
- 1987 - Perfect Jet
- 1986 - Limitless
- 1985 - Britt's Kingdom
- 1984 - Rising Prince
- 1983 - Our Shout
- 1982 - Just For Tristram
- 1981 - Port Carling
- 1980 - Peninsula
- 1979 - Azranee
- 1978 - Dear John
- 1977 - Princely Sum
- 1976 - Ming Dynasty
- 1975 - On Your Mark
- 1974 - Kasharyl
- 1973 - Rangoon
- 1972 - Big Butch
- 1971 - Dark Diamond
- 1970 - Royal Entrance
- 1969 - Regal Jane
- 1968 - Sandy's Hope
- 1967 - Duo
- 1966 - Royal Display
- 1965 - Flotsam
- 1964 - Hyde
- 1963 - General Delivery
- 1962 - Alspick
- 1961 - Kamikaze
- 1960 - Dual Copy
- 1959 - Nadar Shah
- 1958 - Compass
- 1957 - Half Hennesy
- 1956 - Baystone
- 1955 - Viteren
- 1954 - Pipe On
- 1953 - Double Blank
- 1952 - Carioca
- 1951 - Persist
- 1950 - Ballroom
- 1949 - Snowstream
- 1948 - Regal Son
- 1947 - Silent
- 1946 - Haxton
- 1945 - Invictus
- 1944 - Easter Time
- 1943 - Cream Puff
- 1942 - Amberspear
- 1941 - Santa
- 1940 - Malagigi
- 1939 - Bringa
- 1938 - Red Sails
- 1937 - Young Crusader
- 1936 - Sir Ross
- 1935 - Vice Royal
- 1934 - Dark Chief
- 1933 - Nord
- 1932 - ‡Pretzel/Miss Nottava
- 1931 - Vertigern
- 1930 - Dalston
- 1929 - Donald
- 1928 - Donald
- 1927 - Vitality
- 1926 - Strongbow
- 1925 - Dainty Davie
- 1924 - Prince Minimbah
- 1923 - King Of The Forest
- 1922 - Oranian
- 1921 - King Of The Forest
- 1920 - Braille
- 1919 - Pah King
- 1918 - Arch Marella
- 1917 - Poitrel
- 1916 - The Fortune Hunter
- 1915 - Foil
- 1914 - Lochano
- 1913 - Barlow
- 1912 - Alured
- 1911 - Baw Bee
- 1910 - Britain
- 1909 - Ungarie
- 1908 - Epos
- 1907 - Vanadium
- 1906 - Tatterdemalion
- 1905 - Ossian
- 1904 - Cato
- 1903 - Bridegroom
- 1902 - Aurantia
- 1901 - Caledonia
- 1900 - Blue Metal
- 1899 - Blue Metal
- 1898 - Strathroy
- 1897 - Tornado
- 1896 - Damien
- 1895 - Mahee
- 1894 - Blarney Stone
- 1893 - Jeweller
- 1892 - Little Bernie
- 1891 - Vespasia
- 1890 - Stockwell

† Not held because of outbreak of equine influenza
‡ Dead heat

== See also ==
- List of Australian Group races
- Group races
