= Colin Stephen Quality Handicap =

Horse race in Sydney, Australia

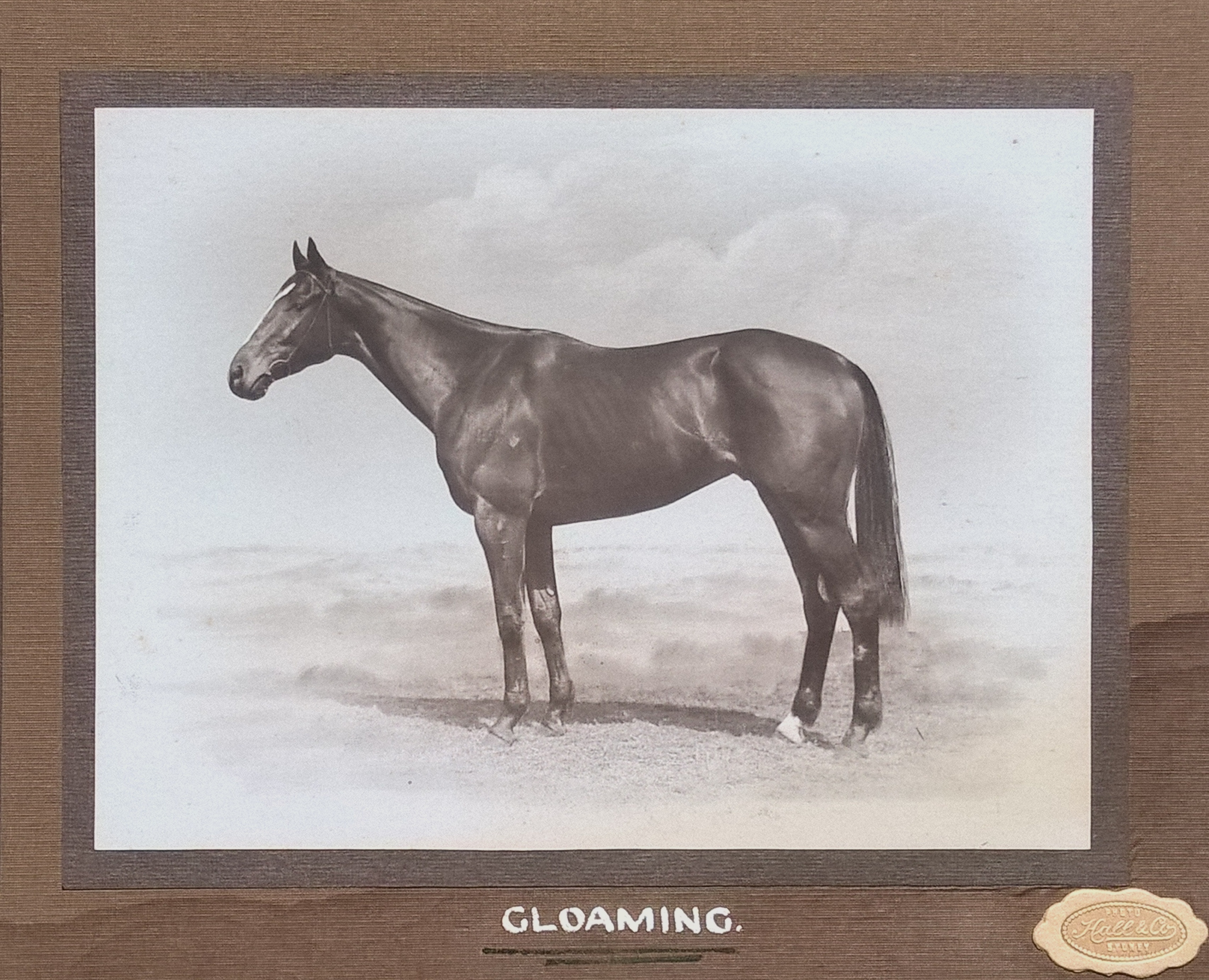
- Gloaming, 1924 winner
- Class: Group 3
- Location: Rosehill Racecourse, Sydney, Australia
- Inaugurated: 1870 (as Spring Stakes)
- Race type: Thoroughbred - flat
- Sponsor: Asahi Super Dry (2025 & 2026)

Race information
- Distance: 2,400 metres
- Surface: Turf
- Track: Right-handed
- Qualification: Horses three years old and older
- Weight: Quality handicap
- Purse: A$250,000 (2026)
- Bonuses: Winner exemption from a ballot on The Metropolitan

The Colin Stephen Quality Handicap is an Australian Turf Club Group 3 Thoroughbred open quality handicap horse race for horses three years old and older, over a distance of 2400 metres, held annually at Rosehill Racecourse, Sydney, Australia, in September.

== History ==
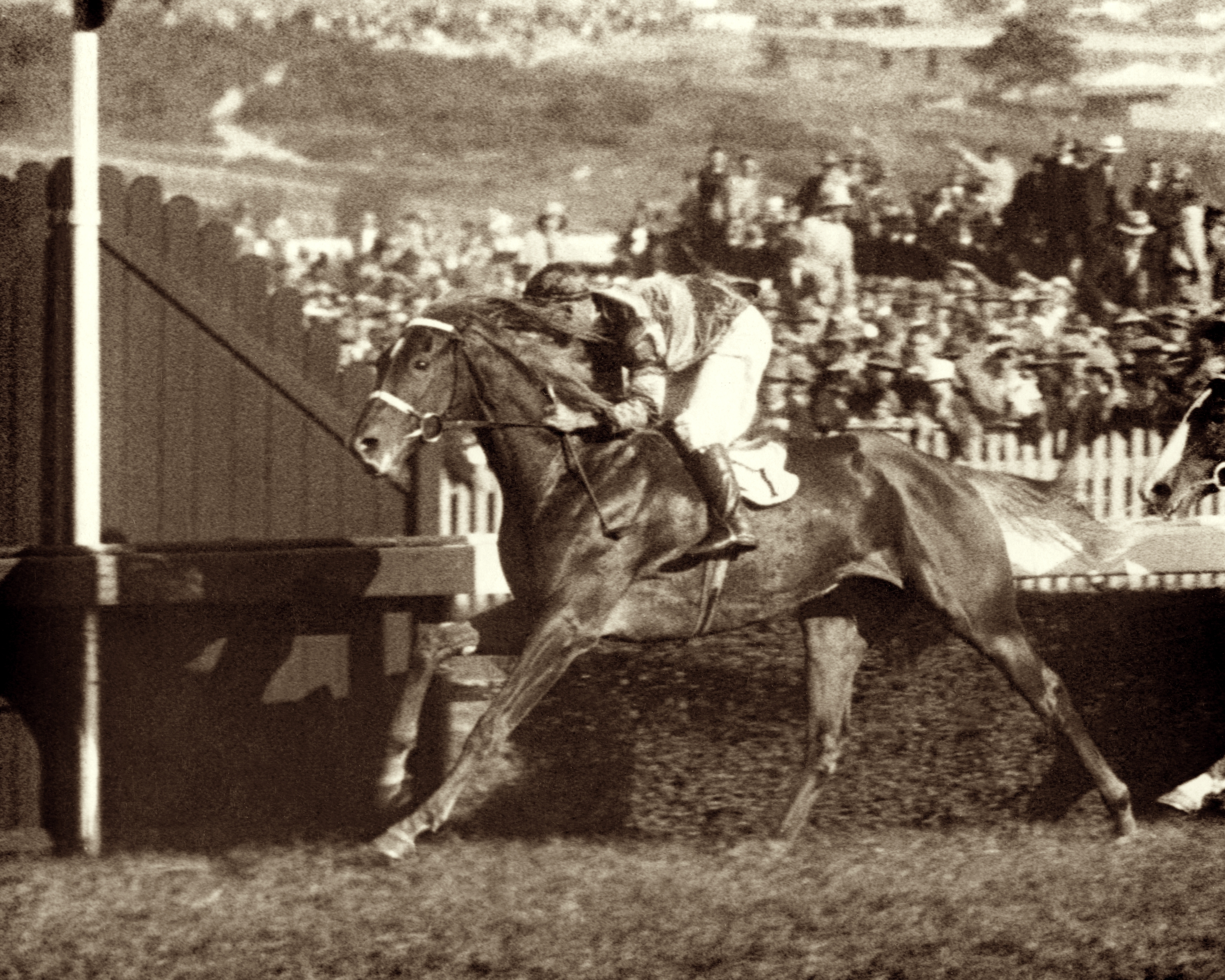
Peter Pan –1935 winner Jim Pike up

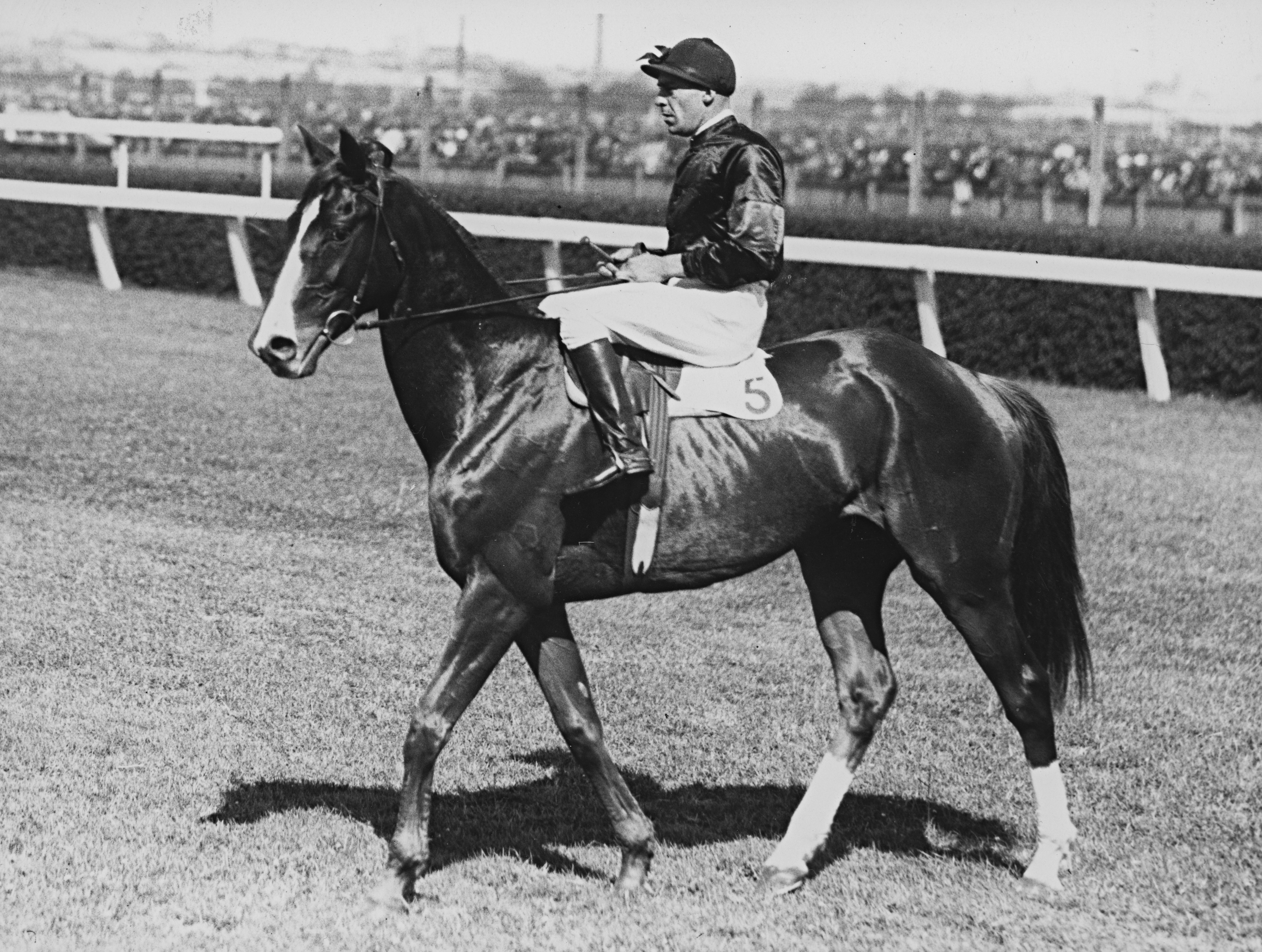
Rogilla, 1933 & 1934 winner

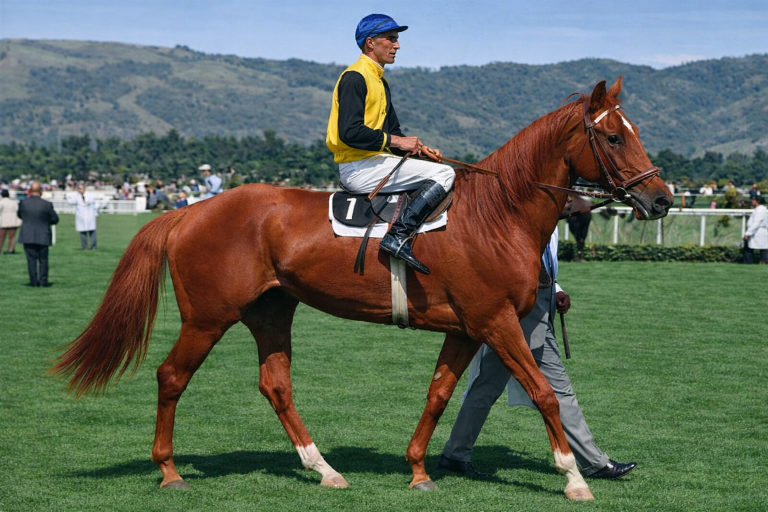
Redcraze, 1956 winner

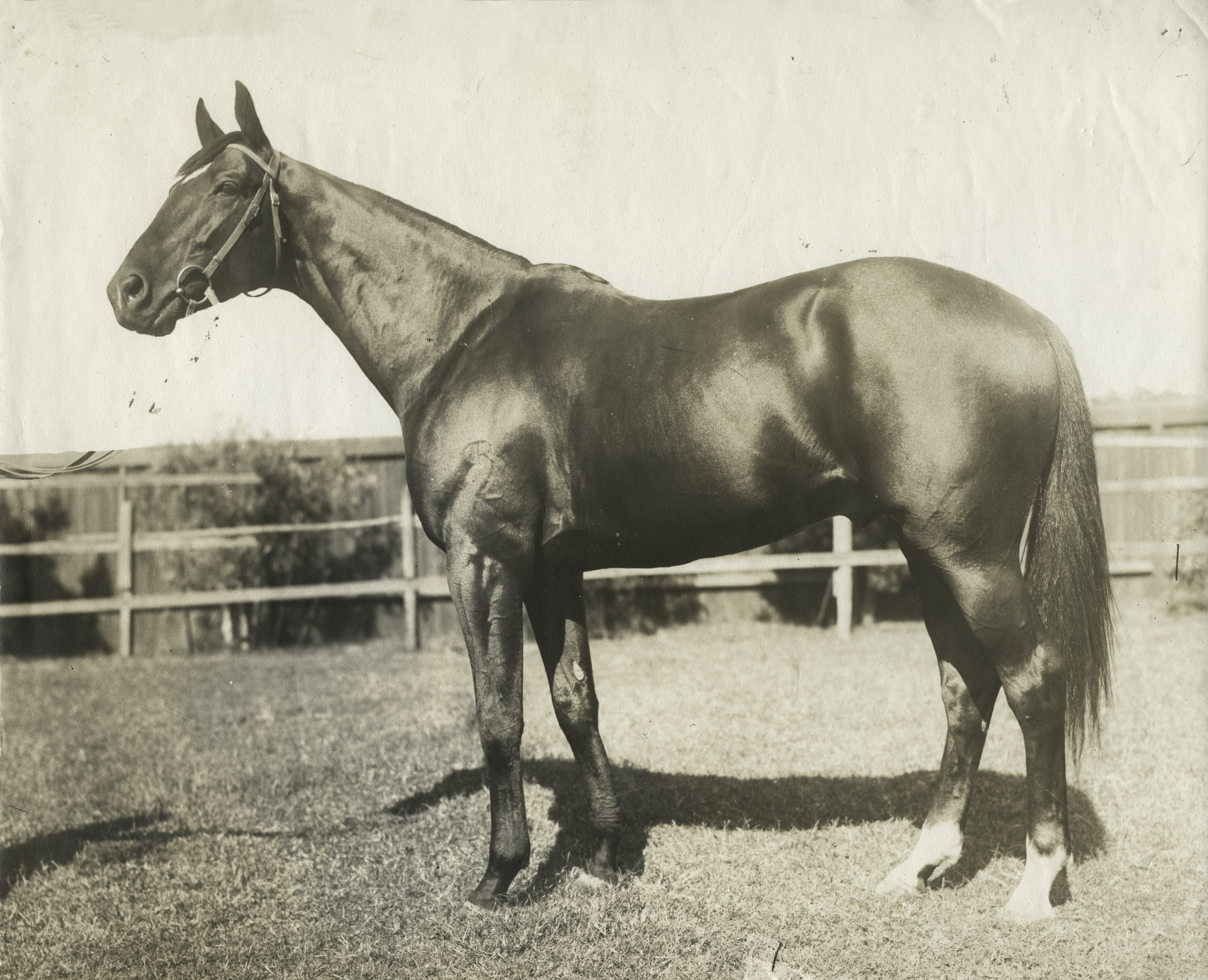
Poseidon, 1907 winner

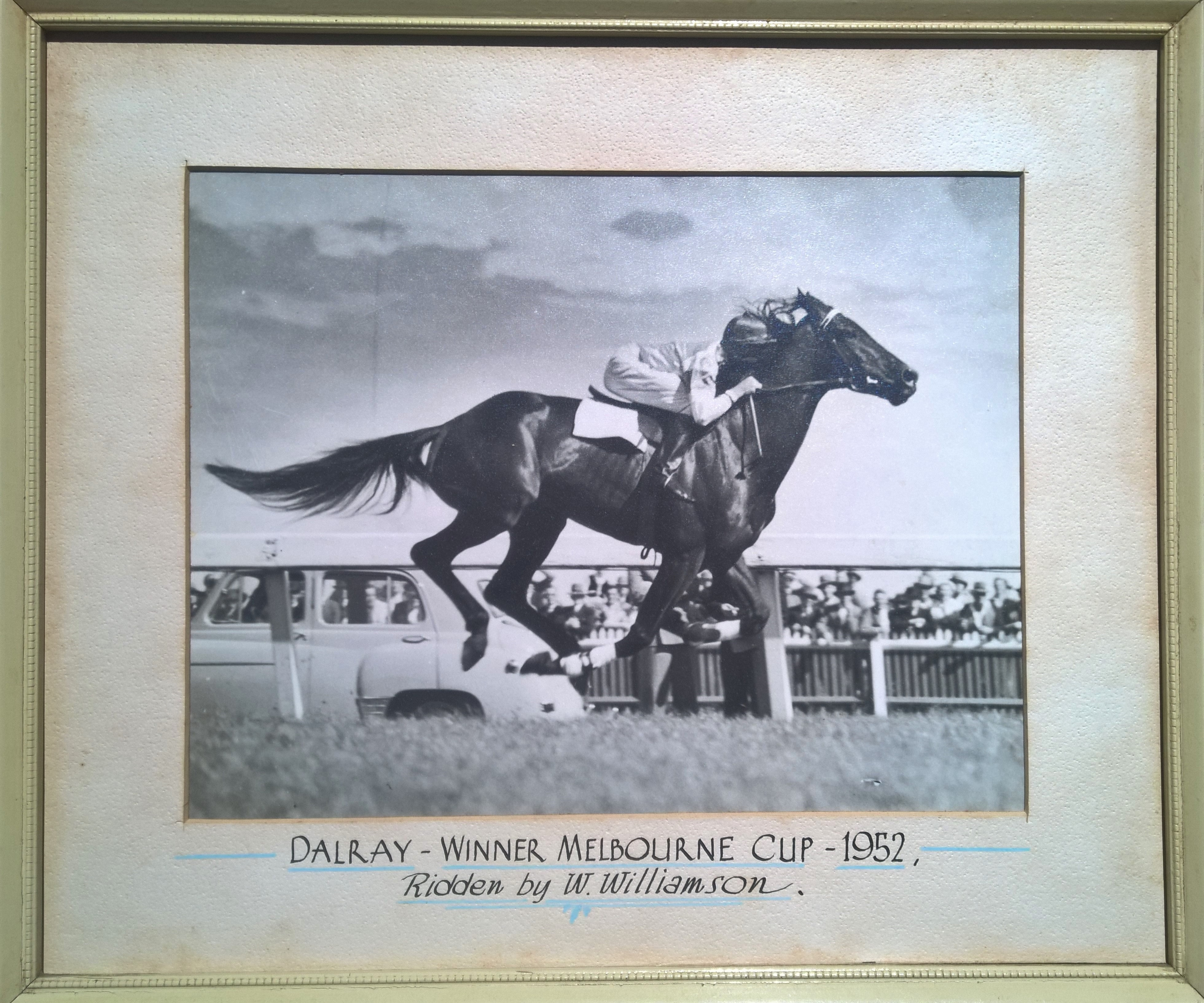
Dalray, 1952 winner

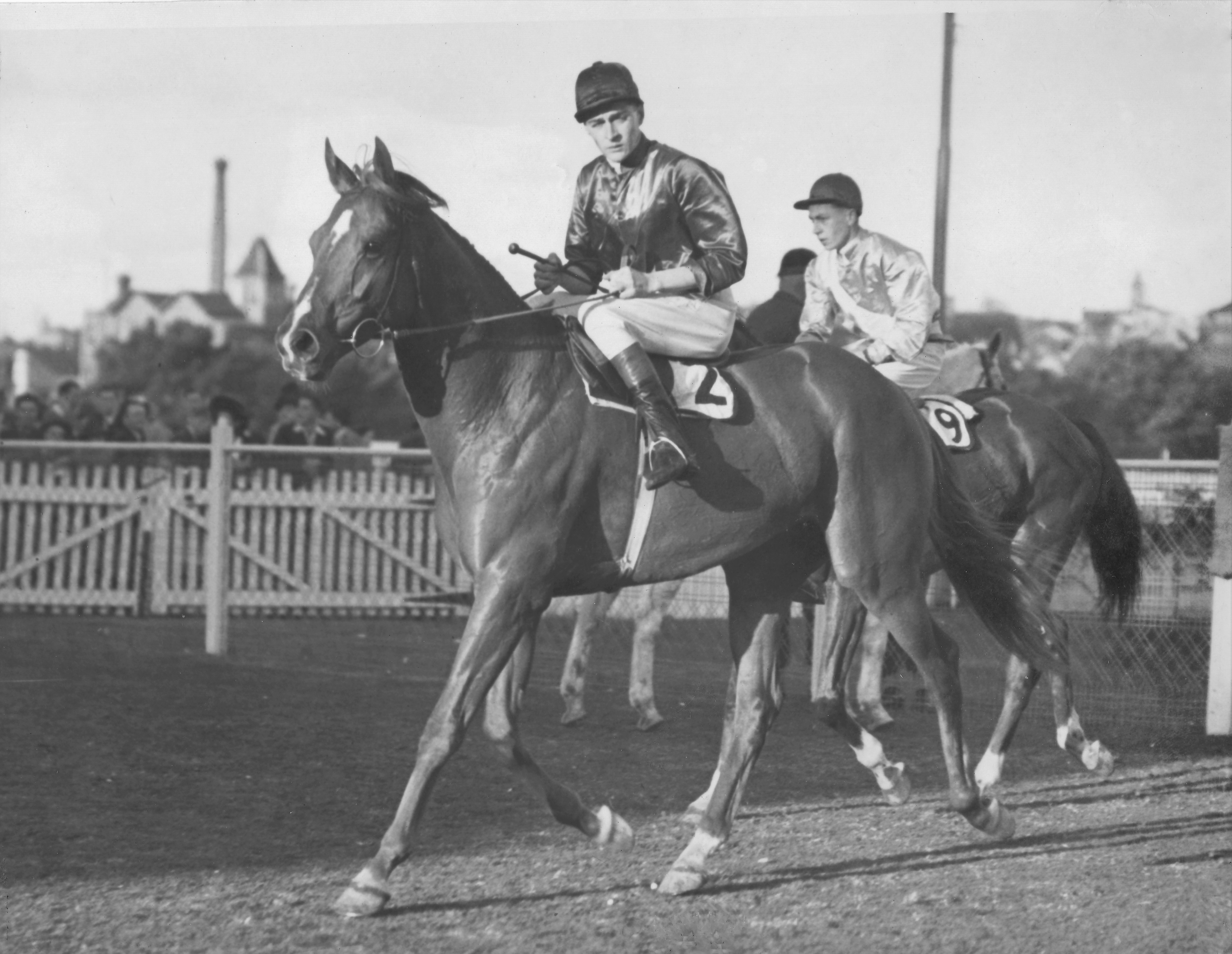
Russia, 1945 winner

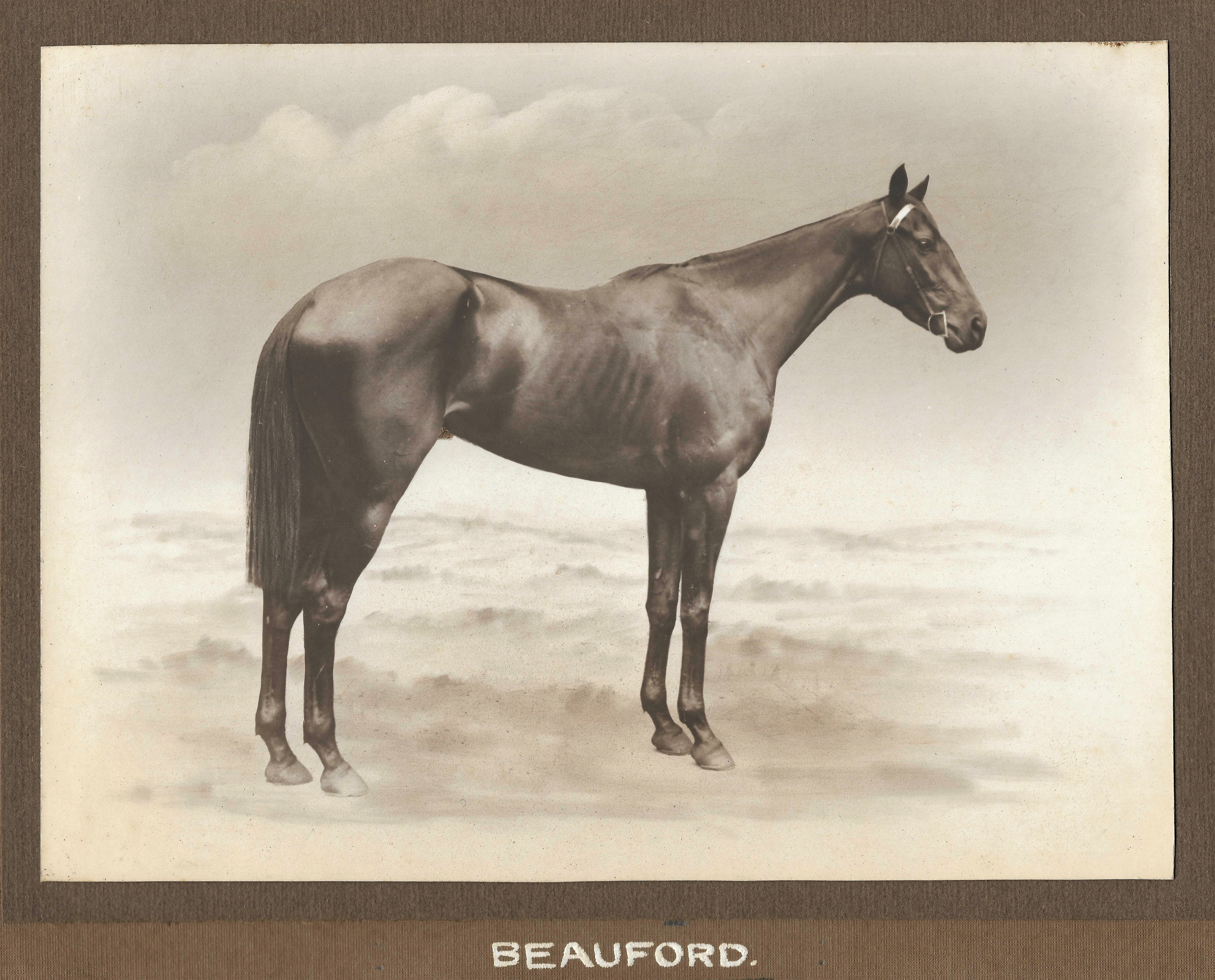
Beauford, 1922 winner

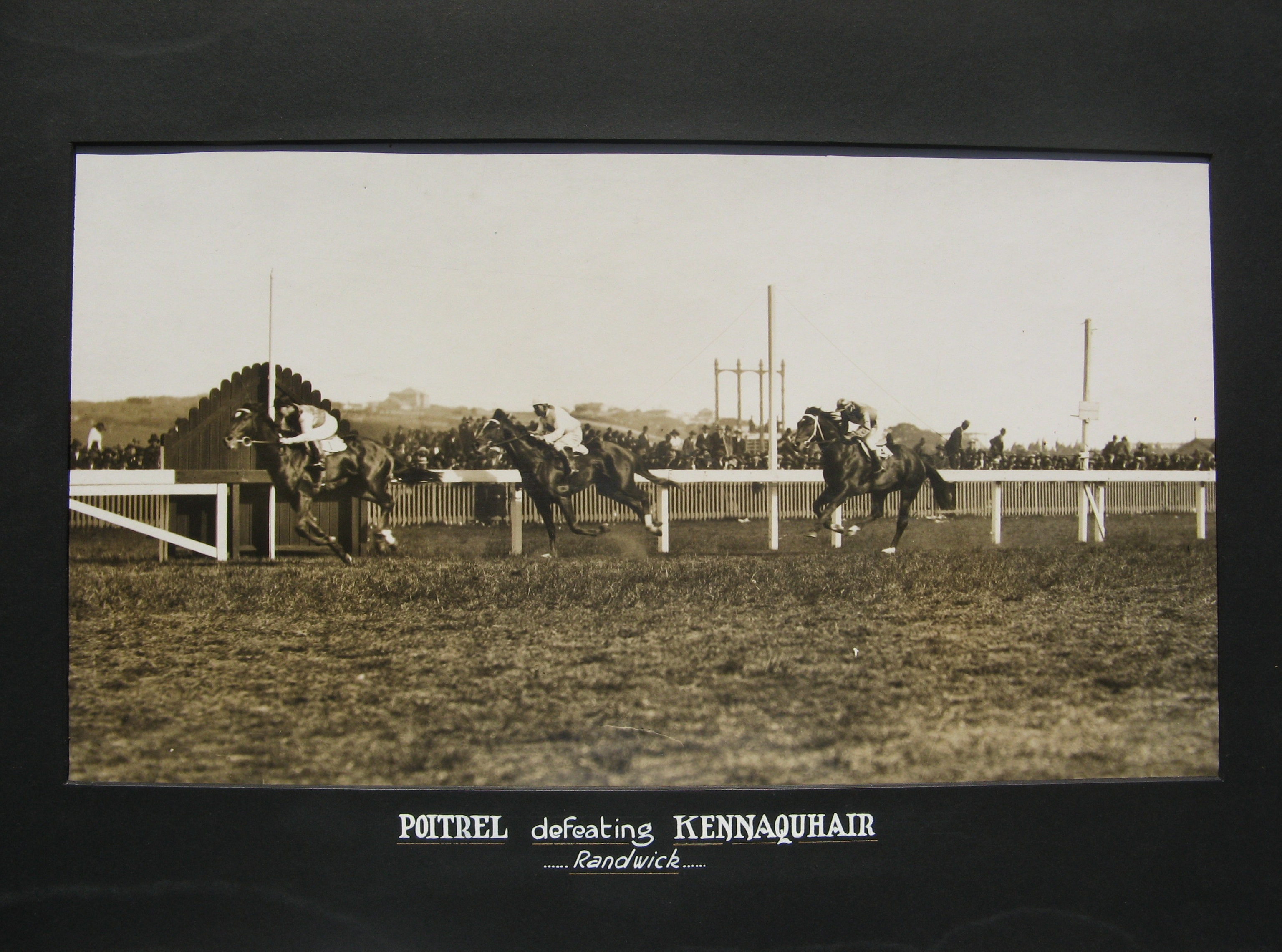
Poitrel, 1918, 1919 & 1920 winner

=== Name ===
The race is named after the former chairman of the Australian Jockey Club Sir Colin Stephen (1872–1937). Stephen was a solicitor, horse racing administrator, racehorse owner/breeder and polo player. A committee member from 1912 served on the Sir Adrian Knox sub-committee which framed the rules of racing of that year and as chairman of the Australian Jockey Club from 1919, Stephen was determined to make racing in New South Wales a clean and healthy pastime. In 1933 his revised rules were adopted throughout Australia. Sir Colin Stephen’s racing colours of Pale blue, white cap were carried to success by the Ascot Vale Stakes winners Fidelity 1936 & Caesar 1937 defeating the champion Ajax.

This race was called the AJC Spring Stakes until 1938. In 1976, 1983, 1988 and 2006 it was known as the AJC Queens Cup. During 1989 and 1995 the race was called the AJC The Japan Trophy race. In 1977 it was the AJC Jubilee Handicap.

In 2016 the event was raced as the Queen's Cup, which was also held at Rosehill in 2022.

=== Grade ===
- 1870–1978 - Principal race
- 1979–1982 - Listed race
- 1983 - Group 3
- 1984–1986 - Listed race
- 1987 onwards - Group 3

=== Distance ===
- 1870–1871 – 1 3/4 miles (~2600 metres)
- 1872–1971 – 1 1/2 miles (~2400 metres)
- 1972–2000 - 2400 metres
- 2001 - 2200 metres
- 2002 onwards - 2400 metres

=== Venue ===
- 1870–1982 - Randwick Racecourse
- 1983 - Warwick Farm Racecourse
- 1984–1999 - Randwick Racecourse
- 2000–2001 - Warwick Farm Racecourse
- 2002–2003 - Randwick Racecourse
- 2004 - Warwick Farm Racecourse
- 2005–2010 - Randwick Racecourse
- 2011 onwards - Rosehill Racecourse

=== Conditions ===
- The race was run at Weight for age from 1938 to 1972.

=== 1934 racebook ===
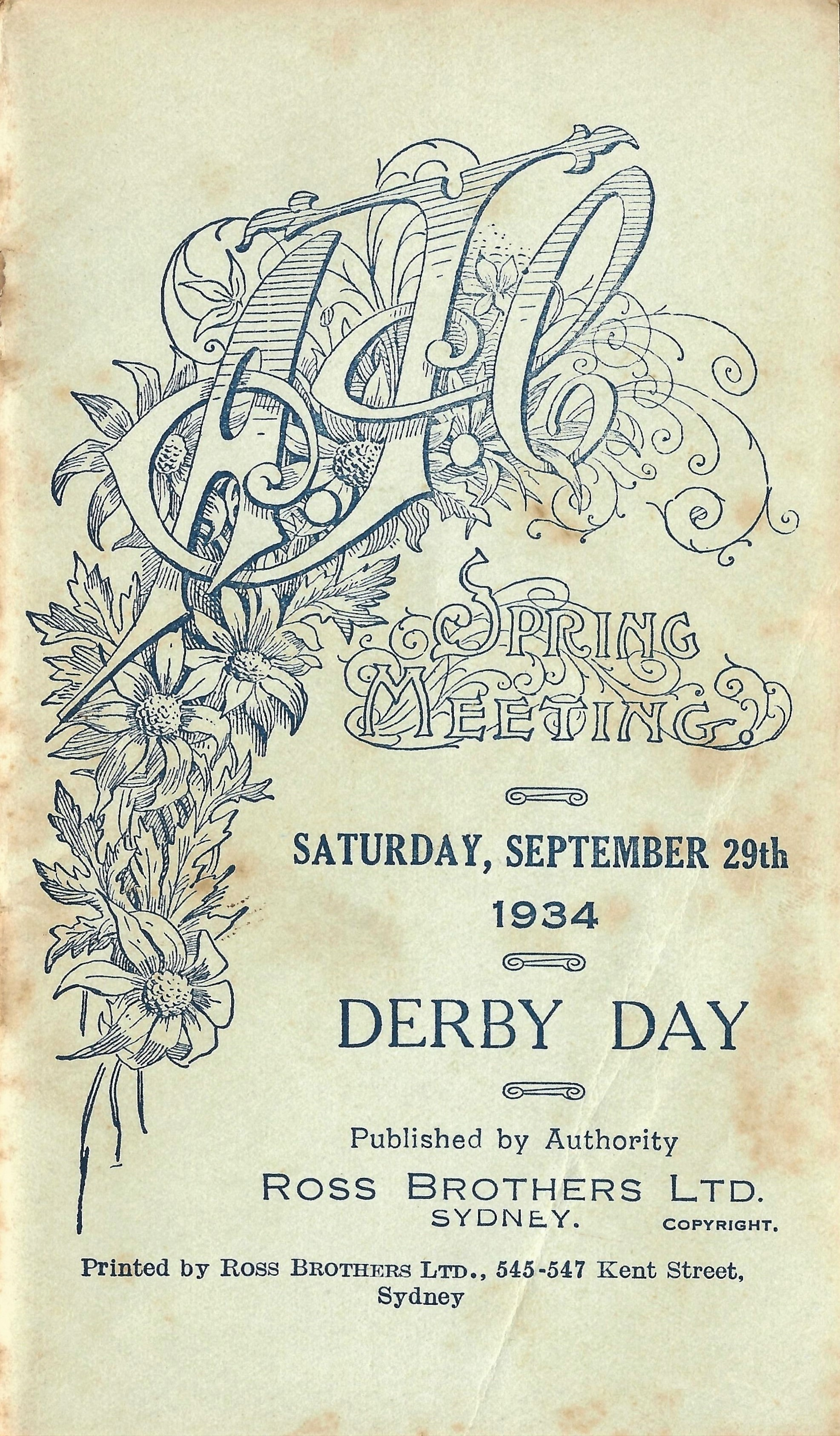
1934 AJC Derby racebook front cover

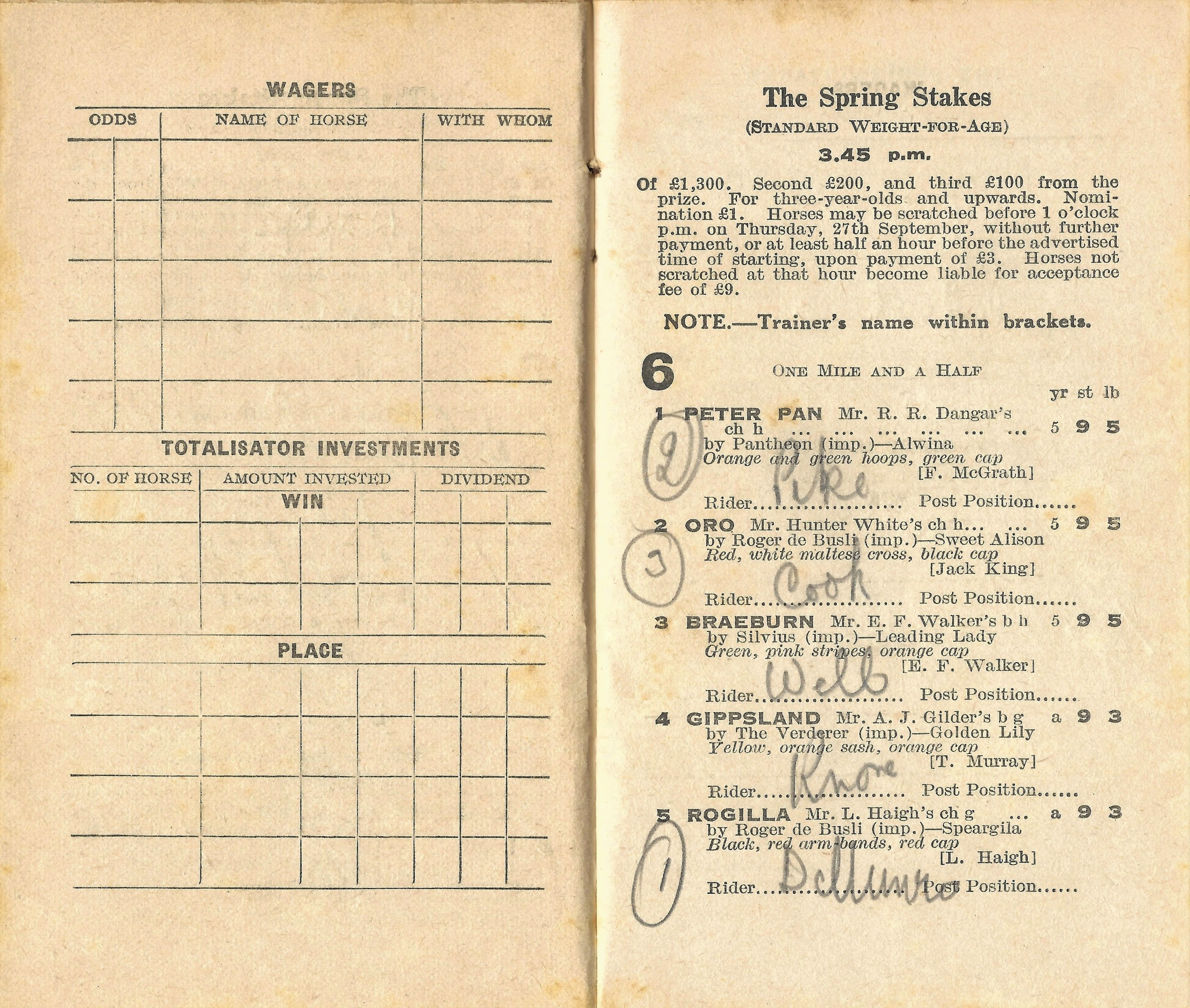
1934 AJC Spring Stakes page showing the winner, Rogilla

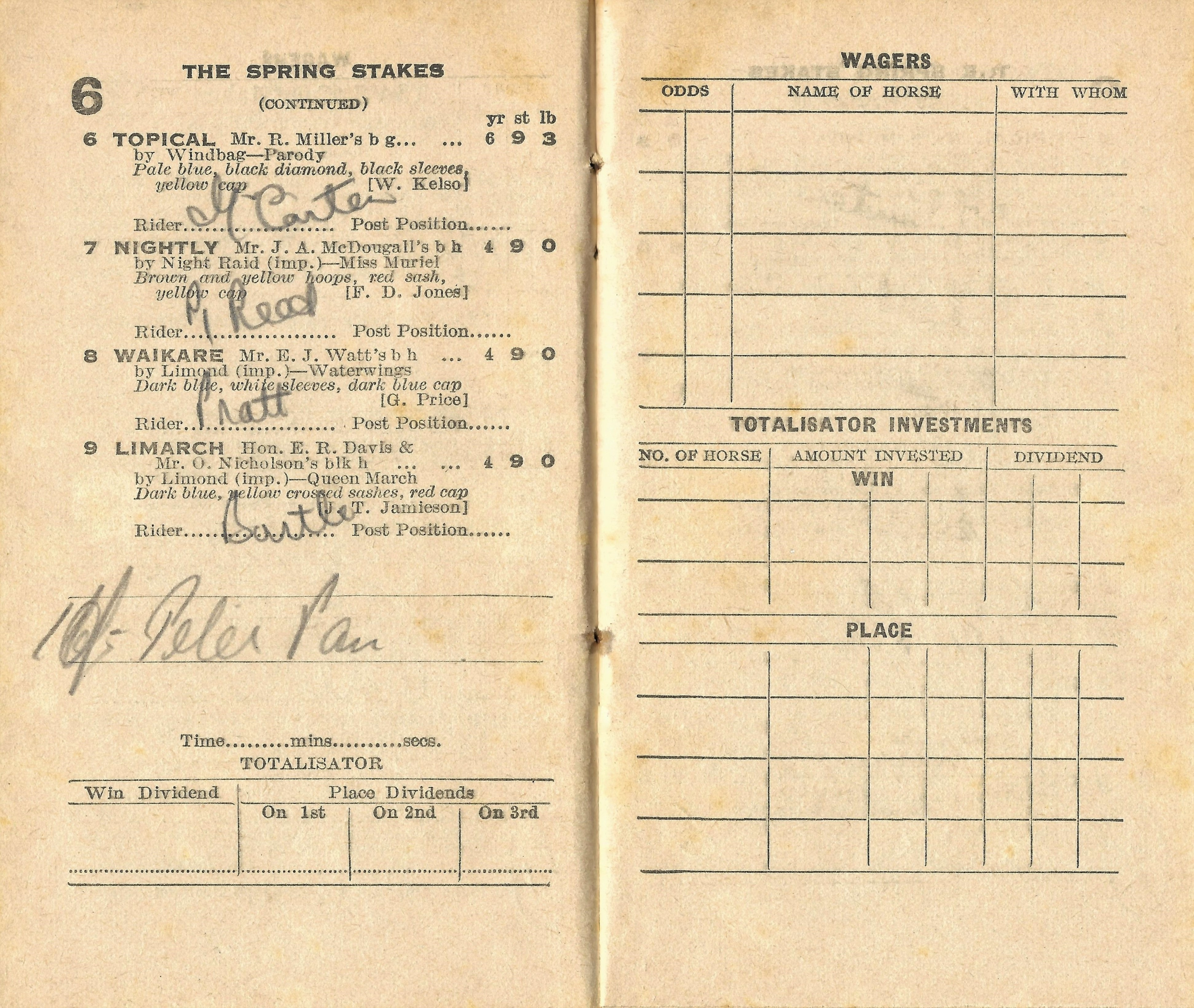
1934 AJC Spring Stakes page starters and results

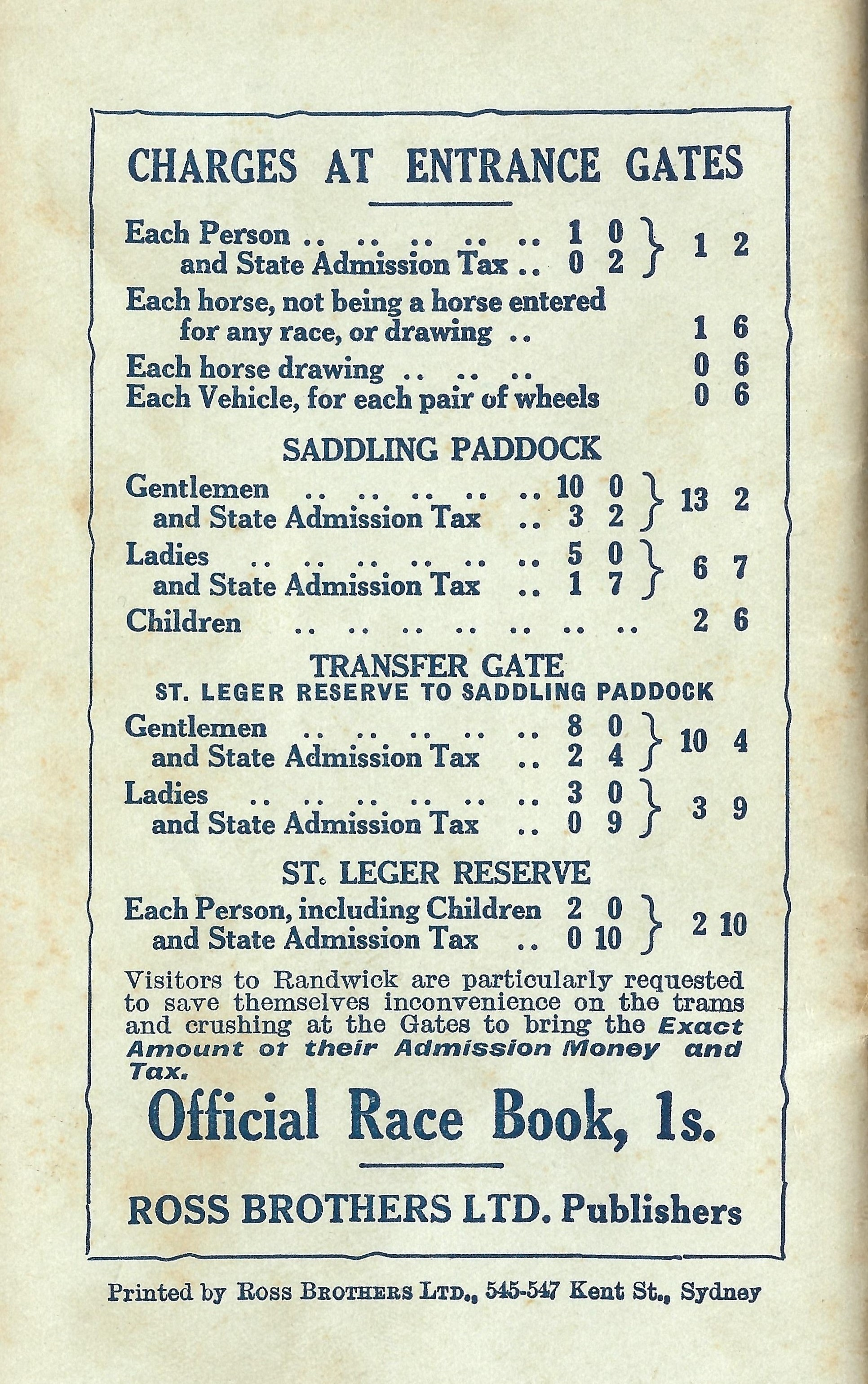
Back cover showing railway & entrance charges

=== 1943,1945 and 1947 racebooks ===
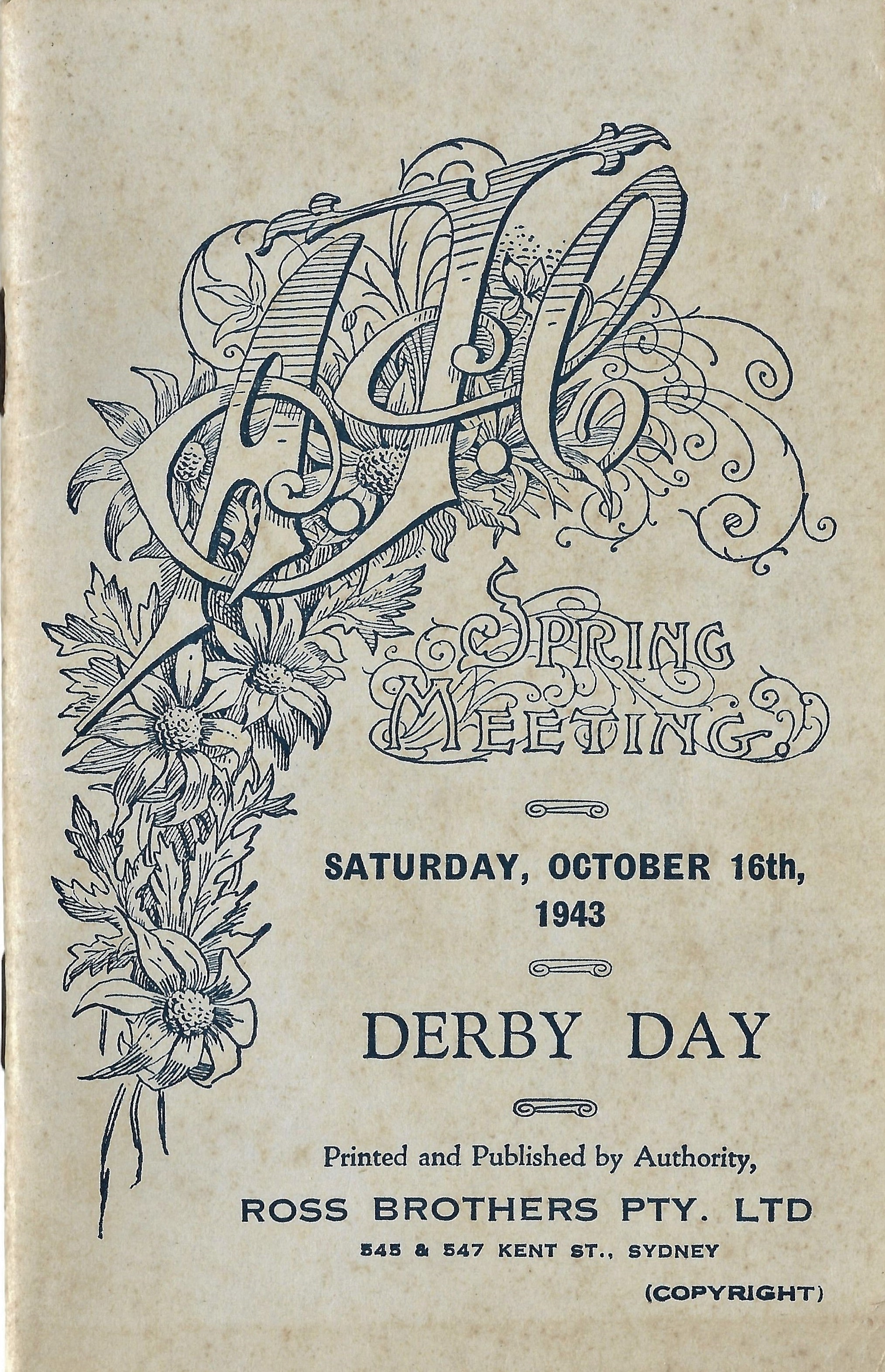
1943 AJC Derby racebook front cover

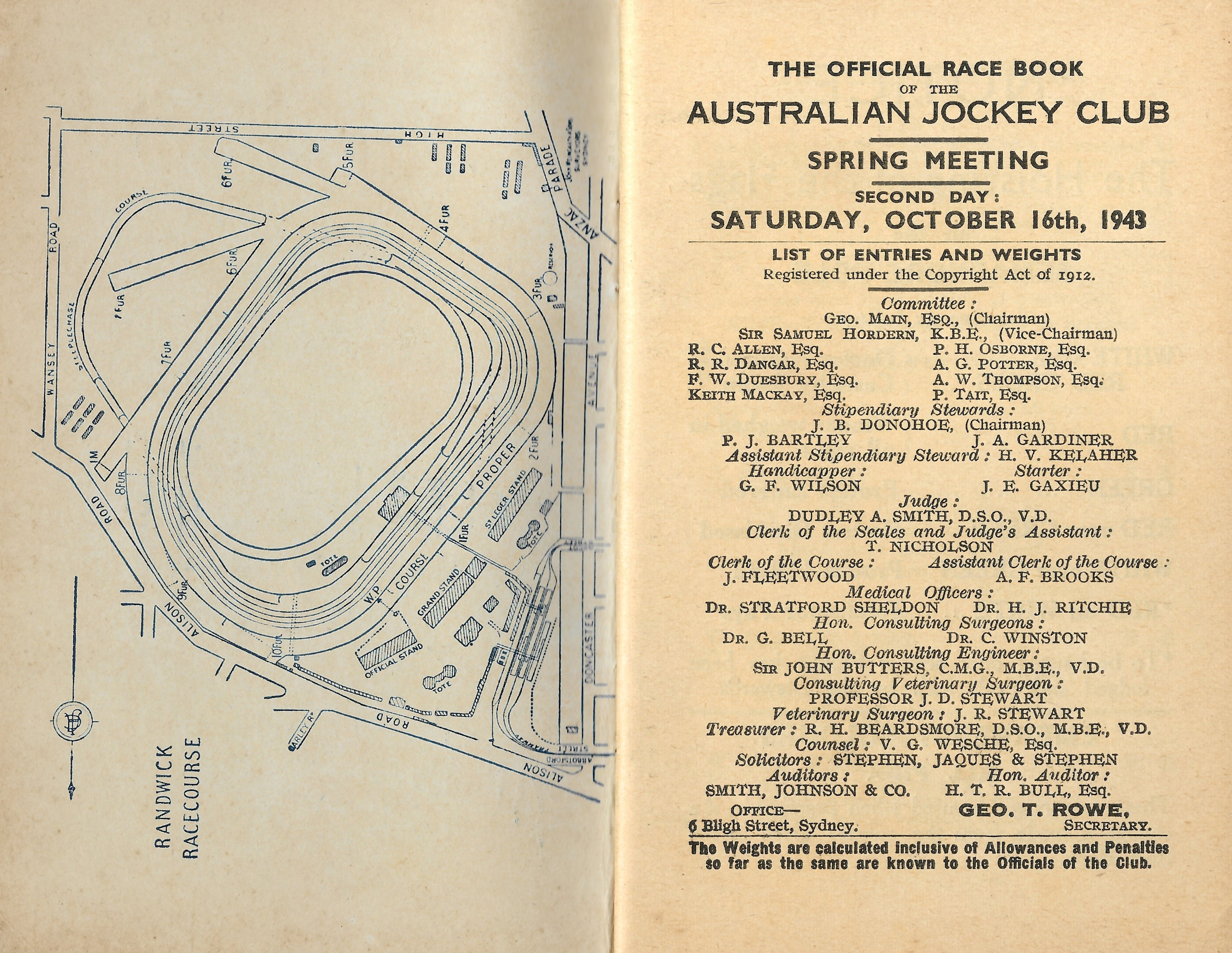
1943 AJC Colin Stephen Stakes page showing raceday officials

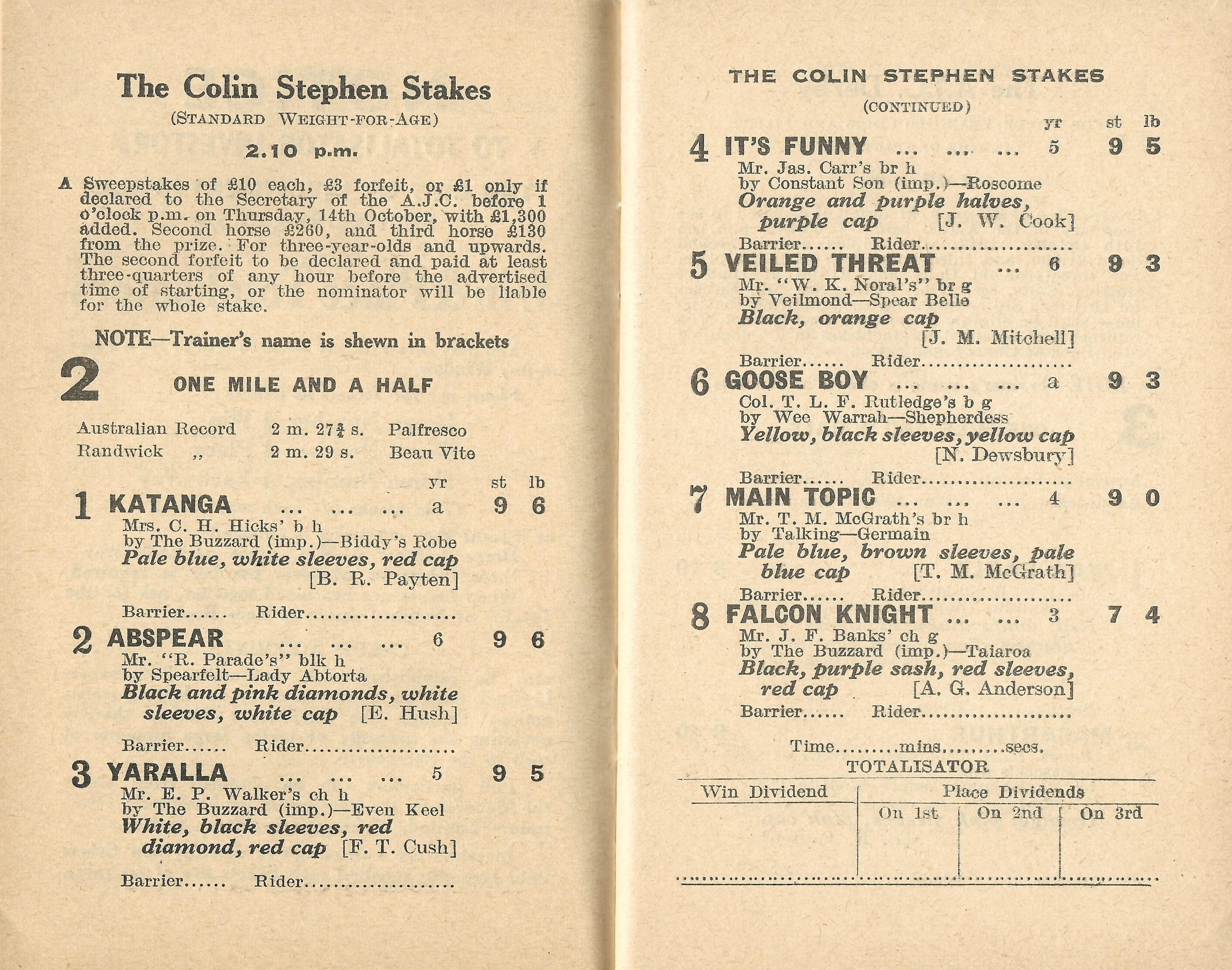
1943 AJC Colin Stephen Stakes showing the winner, Katanga

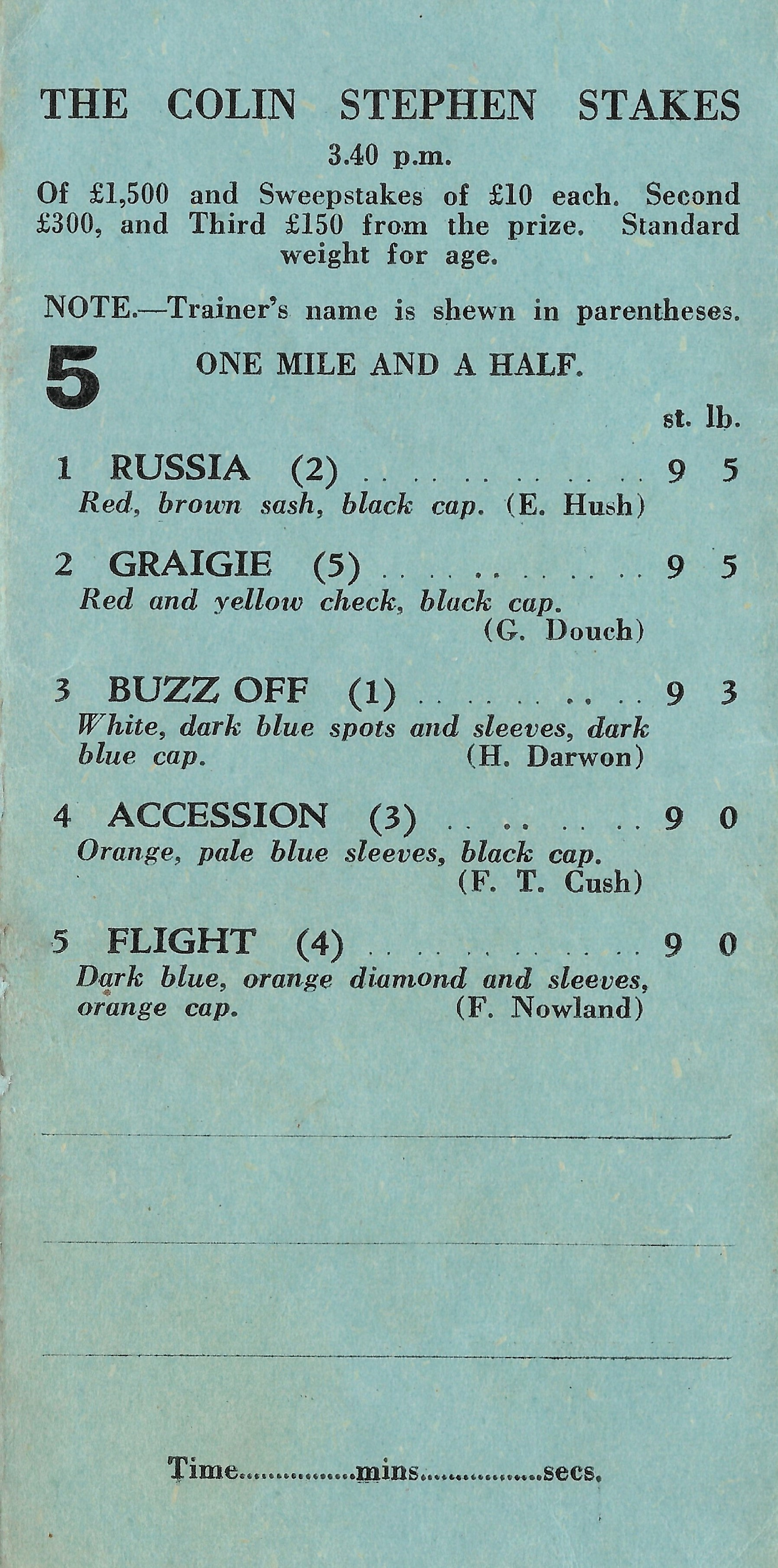
1945 AJC Colin Stephen Stakes showing the winner, Russia

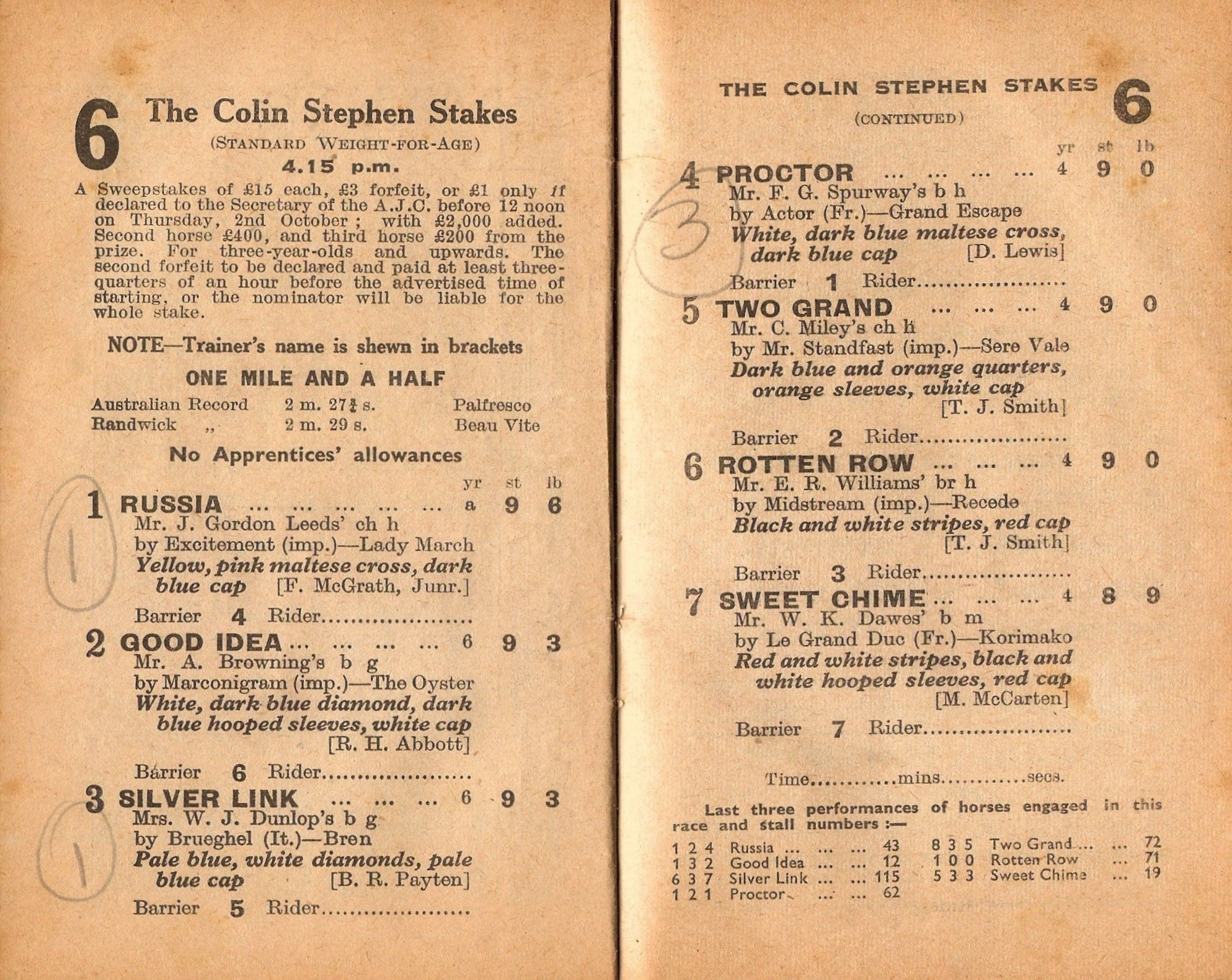
1947 AJC Colin Stephen Stakes showing the winner, Russia

=== Gallery of noted winners ===
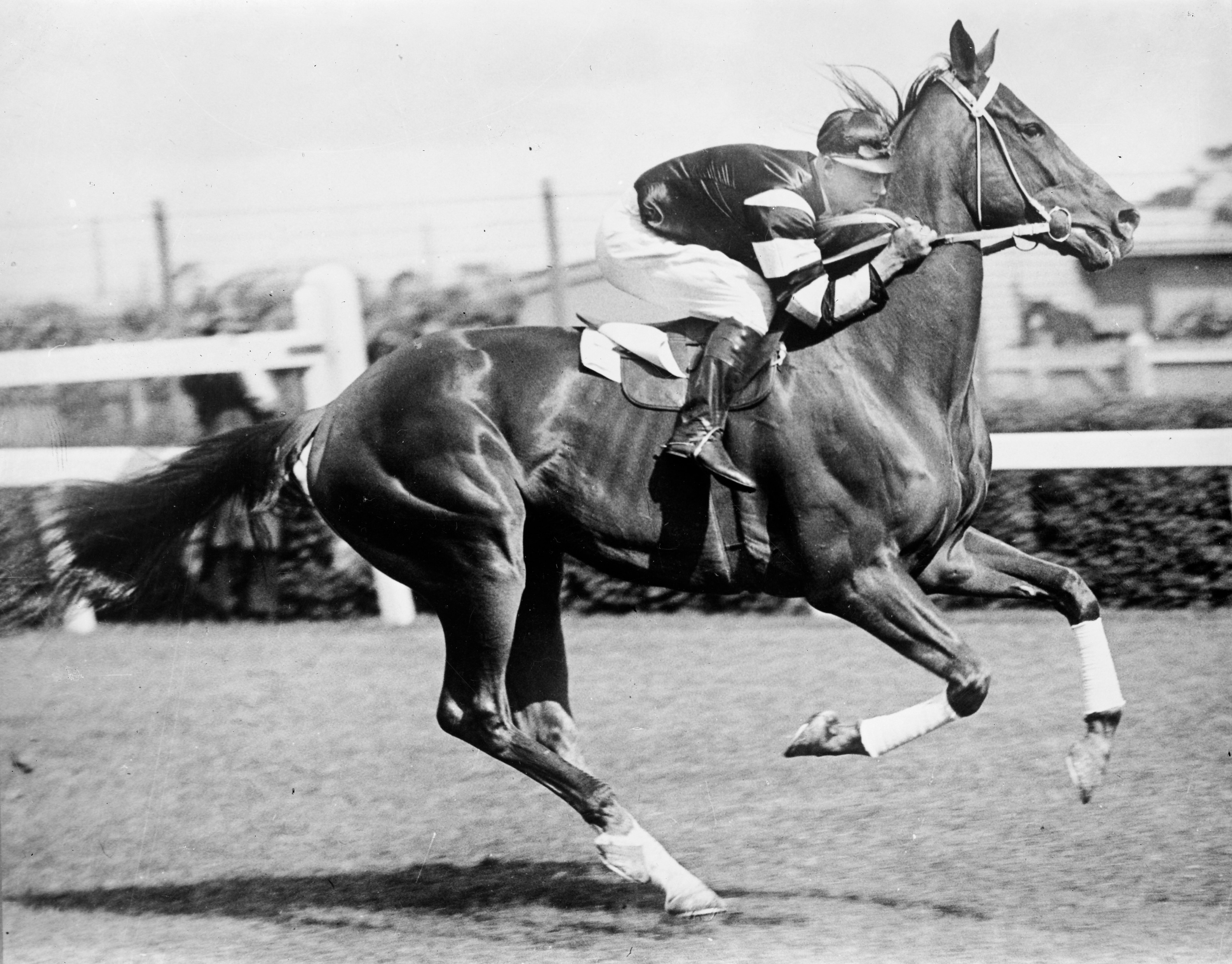
Phar Lap, 1930 & 1931 winner

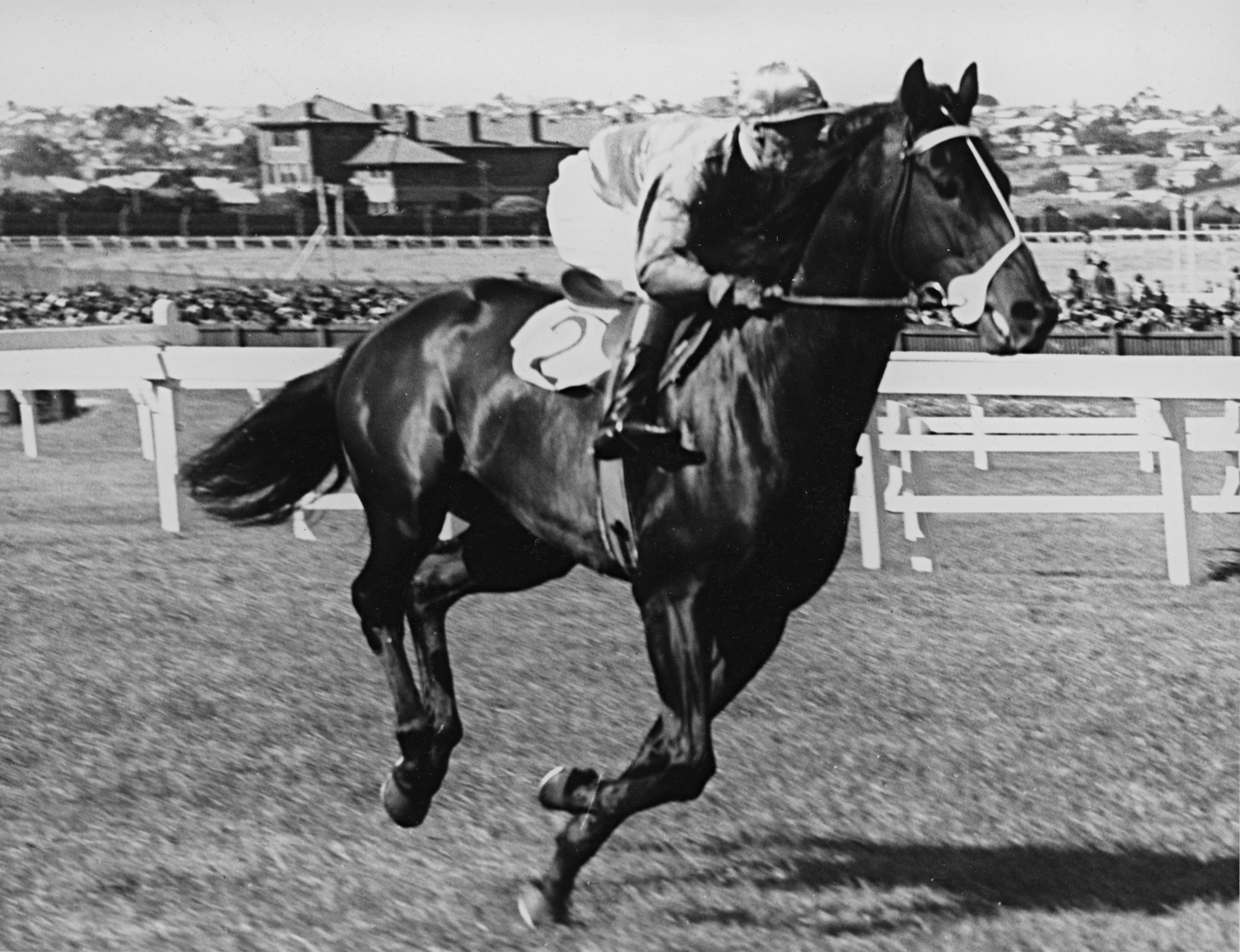
Beau Vite, 1940 & 1941 winner

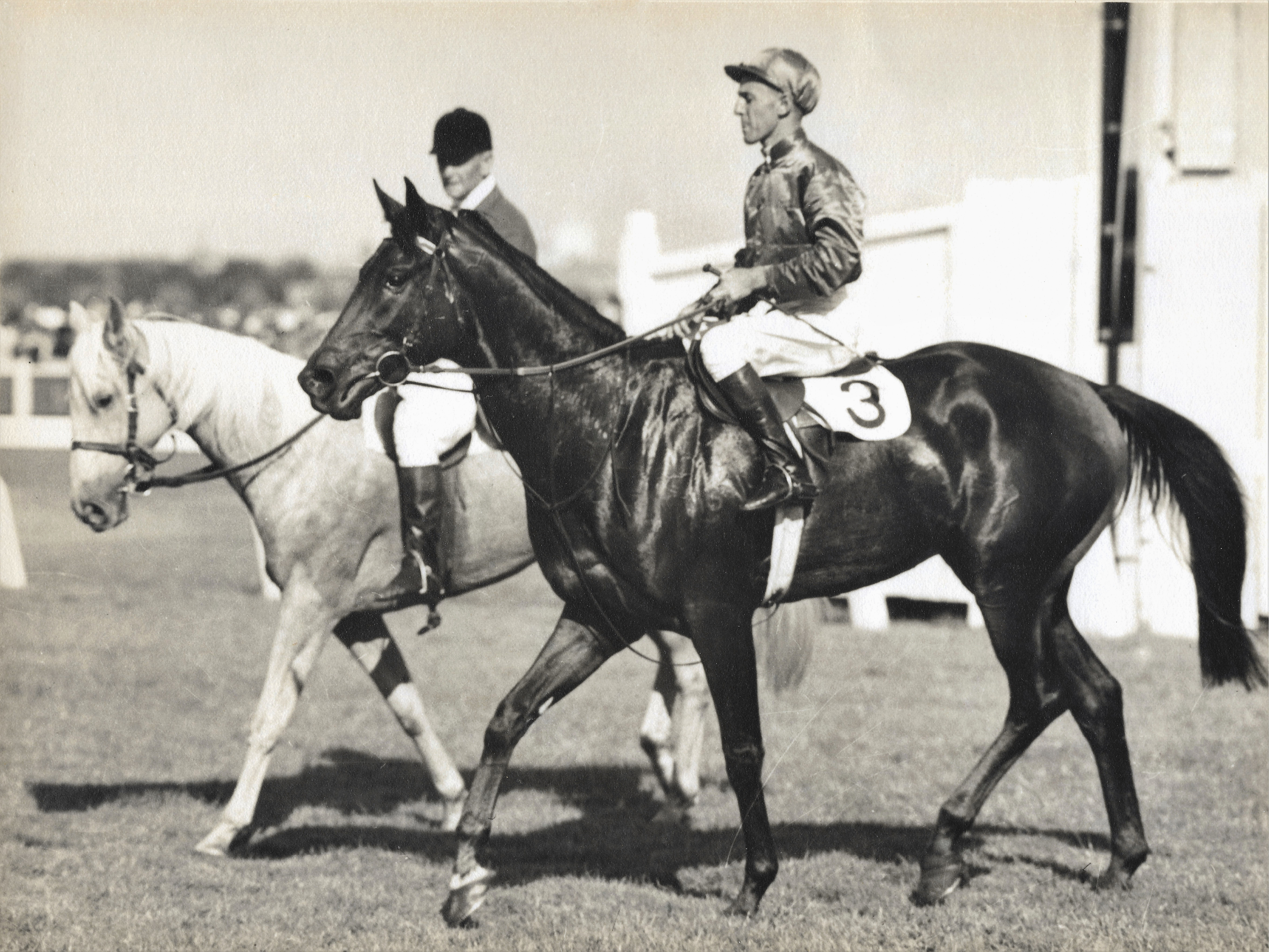
Delta,1950 & 1951 winner

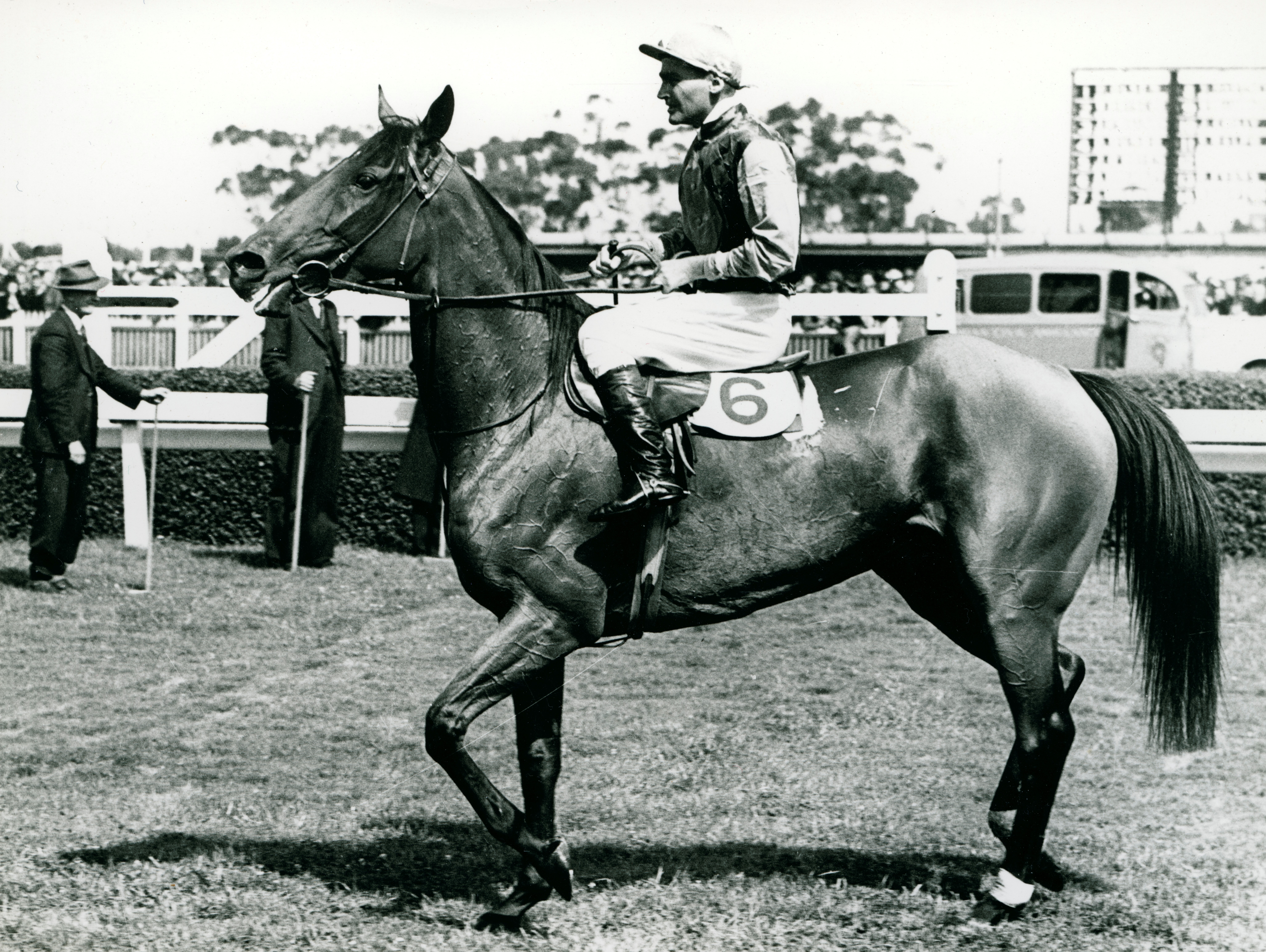
Flight, 1944 winner

== Winners ==
The following are past winners of the race.

- 2026 - So You Are
- 2025 - Piggyback
- 2024 - First Light
- 2023 - Athbascan
- 2022 - Grove Ferry
- 2021 - Entente
- 2020 - Attorney
- 2019 - Stampede
- 2018 - Miss Admiration
- 2017 - Auvray
- 2016 - Allergic
- 2015 - Amelie's Star
- 2014 - Deane Martin
- 2013 - Julienis
- 2012 - Kelinni
- 2011 - Lamasery
- 2010 - No Wine No Song
- 2009 - Mr Clangtastic
- 2008 - Get Up Jude
- 2007 - ‡race not held
- 2006 - Exinite
- 2005 - Railings
- 2004 - Don Raphael
- 2003 - Outlaws
- 2002 - Red Trinket
- 2001 - Dress Circle
- 2000 - Coco Cobanna
- 1999 - Vita Man
- 1998 - In Joyment
- 1997 - Heart Ruler
- 1996 - Hula Flight
- 1995 - Western Approaches
- 1994 - Restitution
- 1993 - Zamination
- 1992 - Garter King
- 1991 - Pontiac Lass
- 1990 - Fine Catch
- 1989 - Macquarie Prince
- 1988 - Natski
- 1987 - Algonquin Club
- 1986 - Rising Fear
- 1985 - Silver Award
- 1984 - Forward Charge
- 1983 - Noble Heights
- 1982 - Nicholas John
- 1981 - Granite King
- 1980 - Bragabout
- 1979 - Outcome
- 1978 - Taksan
- 1977 - Saramore
- 1976 - Tara Regent
- 1975 - Medici
- 1974 - Public Service
- 1973 - The Fixer
- 1972 - Gunsynd
- 1971 - Regal Rhythm
- 1970 - Great Exploits
- 1969 - Nausori
- 1968 - Roman Consul
- 1967 - Garcon
- 1966 - Prince Grant
- 1965 - Amusement Park
- 1964 - Piper's Son
- 1963 - Summer Fair
- 1962 - Burgos
- 1961 - Lord Fury
- 1960 - Valerius
- 1959 - Valerius
- 1958 - Prince Darius
- 1957 - Baron Boissier
- 1956 - Redcraze
- 1955 - Electro
- 1954 - Advocate
- 1953 - Hydrogen
- 1952 - Dalray
- 1951 - Delta
- 1950 - Delta
- 1949 - Vagabond
- 1948 - Dark Marne
- 1947 - †Russia / Silver Link
- 1946 - Good Idea
- 1945 - Russia
- 1944 - Flight
- 1943 - Katanga
- 1942 - Katanga
- 1941 - Beau Vite
- 1940 - Beau Vite
- 1939 - †Royal Chief / Mosaic
- 1938 - Royal Chief
- 1937 - Allunga
- 1936 - Silver Ring
- 1935 - Peter Pan
- 1934 - Rogilla
- 1933 - Rogilla
- 1932 - Veilmond
- 1931 - Phar Lap
- 1930 - Phar Lap
- 1929 - Winalot
- 1928 - Limerick
- 1927 - Limerick
- 1926 - Spearfelt
- 1925 - Windbag
- 1924 - Gloaming
- 1923 - David
- 1922 - Beauford
- 1921 - David
- 1920 - Kennaquhair
- 1920 - Poitrel
- 1919 - Poitrel
- 1918 - Poitrel
- 1917 - Wallace Isinglass
- 1916 - Sasanof
- 1915 - St. Carwyne
- 1914 - St. Carwyne
- 1913 - Duke Foote
- 1912 - Aurofodina
- 1911 - Aurofodina
- 1910 - Comedy King
- 1909 - Trafalgar
- 1908 - Mooltan
- 1907 - Poseidon
- 1906 - Lady Wallace
- 1905 - Emir
- 1904 - Gladsome
- 1903 - Cruciform
- 1902 - Wakeful
- 1901 - San Fran
- 1900 - Paul Pry
- 1899 - Dewey
- 1898 - Merloolas
- 1897 - Positano
- 1896 - Newhaven
- 1895 - Quiver
- 1894 - Brockleigh
- 1893 - Loyalty
- 1892 - Bungebah
- 1891 - Megaphone
- 1890 - Carbine
- 1889 - Abercorn
- 1888 - The Australian Peer
- 1887 - Trident
- 1886 - Lord William
- 1885 - Moonshee
- 1884 - Malua
- 1883 - First Demon
- 1882 - Hecla
- 1881 - Wellington
- 1880 - Creswick
- 1879 - Chester
- 1878 - Chester
- 1877 - Robinson Crusoe
- 1876 - Valentia
- 1875 - Kingsborough
- 1874 - Javelin
- 1873 - Dagworth
- 1872 - Dagworth
- 1871 - Aveline
- 1870 - Illumination

† Dead heat
‡ Not held because of outbreak of equine influenza

== See also ==
- Golden Pendant
- Golden Rose Stakes
- Shannon Stakes
- List of Australian Group races
- Group races
