= Lord Fury =

Australian Thoroughbred racehorse (1957–1980)

- Sire: Edwardsii (IRE)
- Grandsire: Nasrullah (GB)
- Dam: Sea Ruffle (AUS)
- Damsire: Sea Tonic (GB)
- Sex: Stallion
- Foaled: 1957
- Died: 1980
- Country: Australia
- Colour: Brown
- Owner: NS Cohen
- Trainer: FB Lewis

Major wins
- Melbourne Cup (1961); Colin Stephen Stakes (1961); Hill Stakes (1961)
- Last updated on 31 October 2017

Lord Fury (1957−1980) was a Thoroughbred racehorse that won the 1961 Melbourne Cup.

In the lead up to the 1961 Melbourne Cup, Lord Fury ran a disappointing last in the Mackinnon Stakes after placing second in the Caulfield Cup. Because of this poor performance, Lord Fury went into the Melbourne Cup as a 20/1 chance. Trained by F.B. Lewis and ridden by Ray Selkrig, Lord Fury led all the way to win the cup, a feat not achieved again until Might and Power led all the way to win the 1997 Melbourne Cup.
