= Poitrel =

Australian racehorse

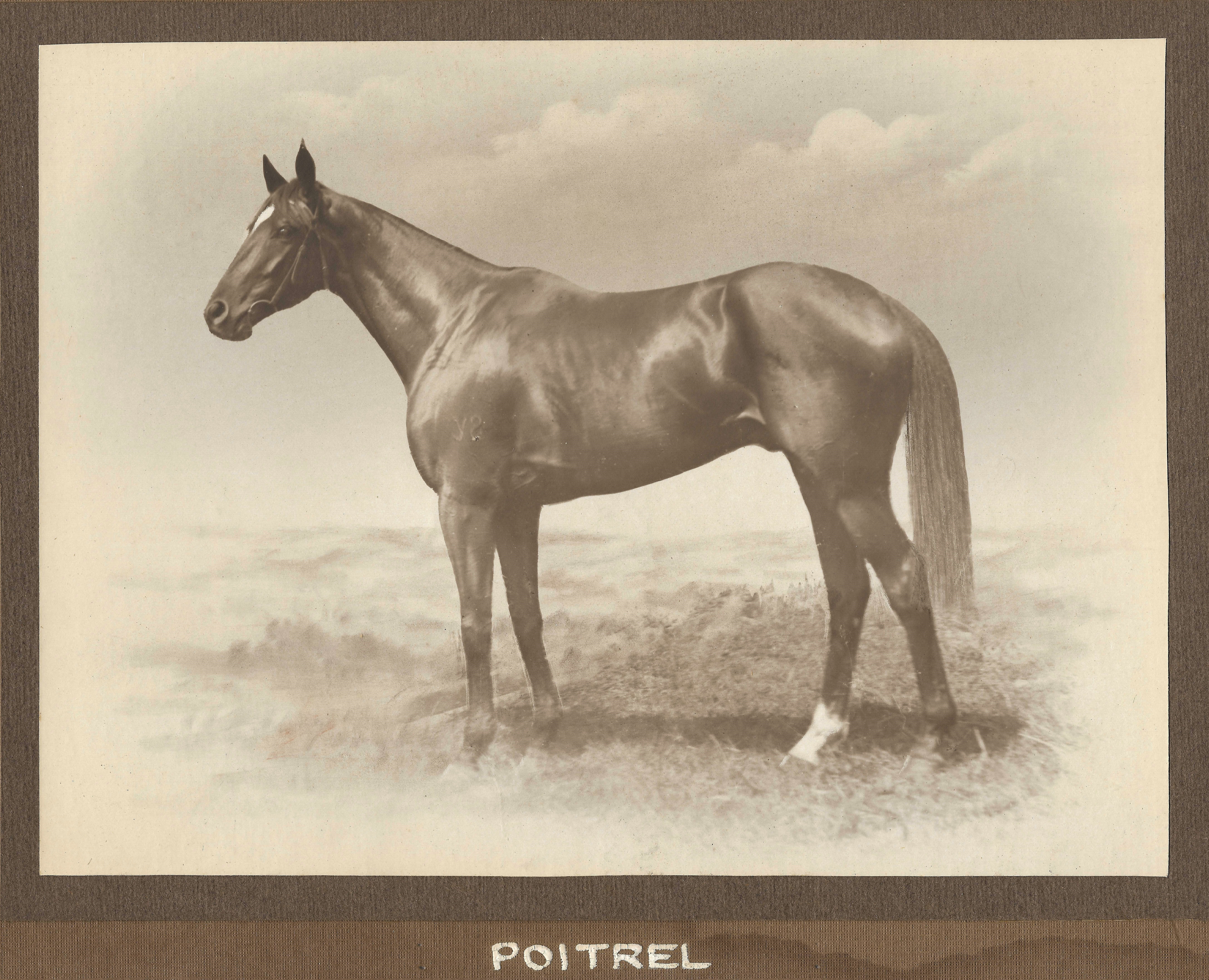
- Sire: Saint Alwyne (GB)
- Grandsire: St. Frusquin (GB)
- Dam: Poinard (AUS)
- Damsire: Metal (GB)
- Sex: Stallion
- Foaled: 1 August 1914
- Died: 5 February 1932 (aged 17)
- Country: Australia
- Colour: Chestnut
- Breeder: W Moses, F Moses
- Owner: W Moses, F Moses
- Trainer: Harry Robinson
- Record: 37:17-3-3
- Earnings: £26,920

Major wins
- AJC Summer Cup (1917); AJC Spring Stakes (1918, 1919 & 1920); AJC Plate (1919, 1920); AJC Autumn Stakes (1919, 1920); Randwick Plate (1919, 1920); Melbourne Cup (1920); AJC Cumberland Stakes (1919, 1920); Rawson Stakes (1921)

Honours
- Australian Racing Hall of Fame

Poitrel (1914−1932) was an Australian bred Thoroughbred racehorse that won the 1920 Melbourne Cup carrying 10 stone (63.5 kg) to victory.

== Background ==
Poitrel was bred by the Moses brothers at Arrowfield Stud in New South Wales in 1914. At the 1916 Sydney yearling sales he failed to reach his 300 Guineas reserve price and was therefore retained by the brothers.

== Racing career ==
Poitrel was often described as plain and wiry. He also had hoof problems, so he was sparingly raced. Nevertheless, he blossomed to become a champion stayer. He was trained astutely throughout his career by H.J. Robinson. In Poitrel's four- and five-year-old seasons, he proved almost unbeatable, winning 16 races in Sydney including two dead-heats. His usual jockey was Ken Bracken. Among the other horses he vanquished were acknowledged champions in their own right, Desert Gold, Gloaming and Eurythmic. For this reason, as a six-year-old, he was allocated the handicap of 10 stone (63.5 kg) for the 1920 Melbourne Cup.

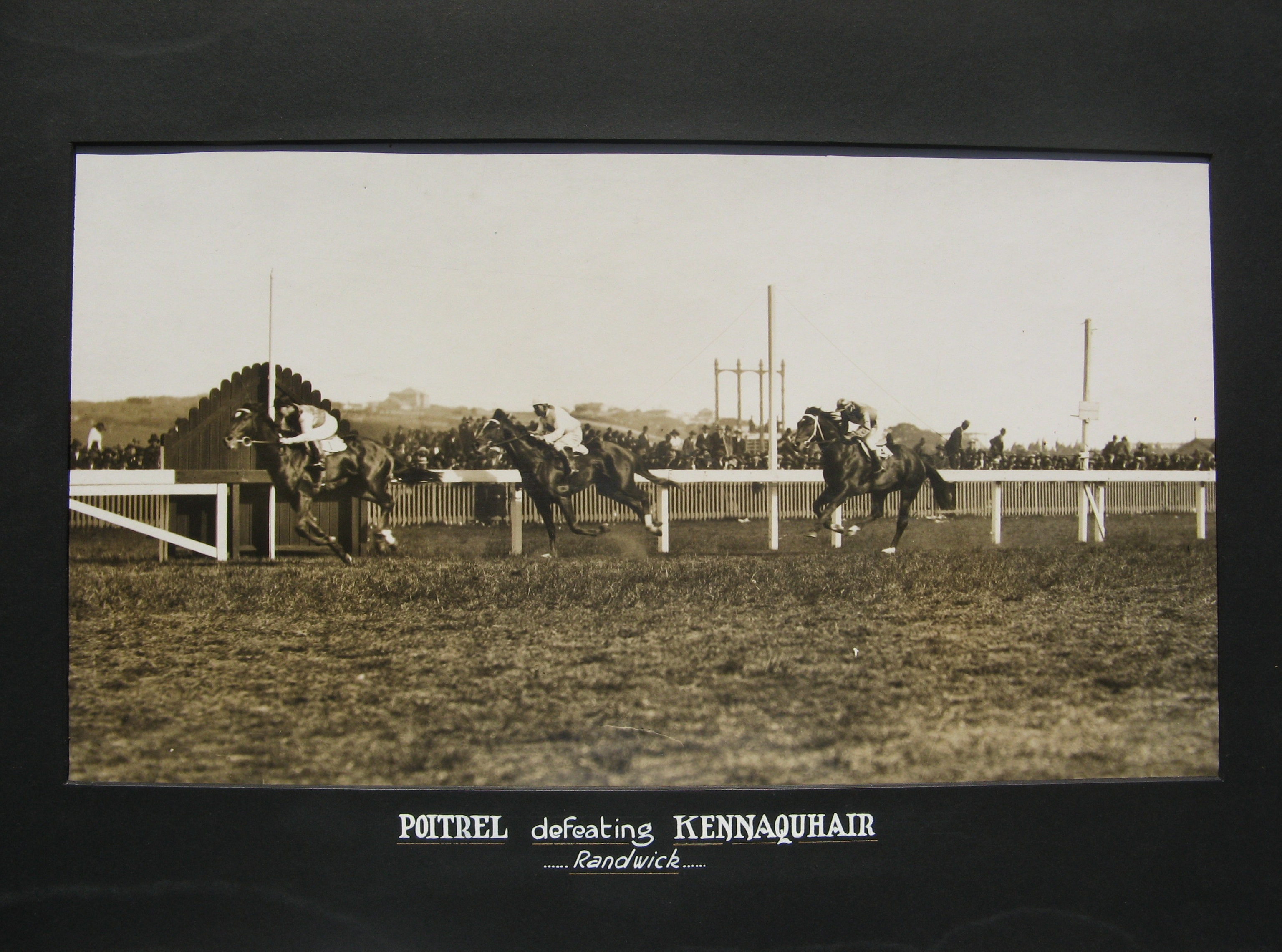
Poitrel, 1920 Randwick Plate winner

== Melbourne Cup ==
Poitrel started the race wide, trailed the field for most of the race, and then came home in the final stages to win by half a length. Some reporters called it the performance of a century: 'He is entitled to be included among the limited band of great horses that have raced in Australia'.

His victory under this heavy burden was Poitrel's only win in Melbourne, but racegoers at Flemington responded to the achievement.

== Stud career ==
Poitrel was retired to Arrowfield Stud, where he stood until the stud was sold, in 1924. He then went to L.K.S. Mackinnon's Maribyrnong Stud, Melbourne. The best of his progeny was Belgamba who won St Leger Stakes' in three states.

Poitrel died on the 2 May 1932 while performing stud duties at Tarong Station north of Toowoomba, Queensland. He was aged 17.

In 2018 Poitrel was inducted to the Australian Racing Hall of Fame.

== 1920 racebook ==
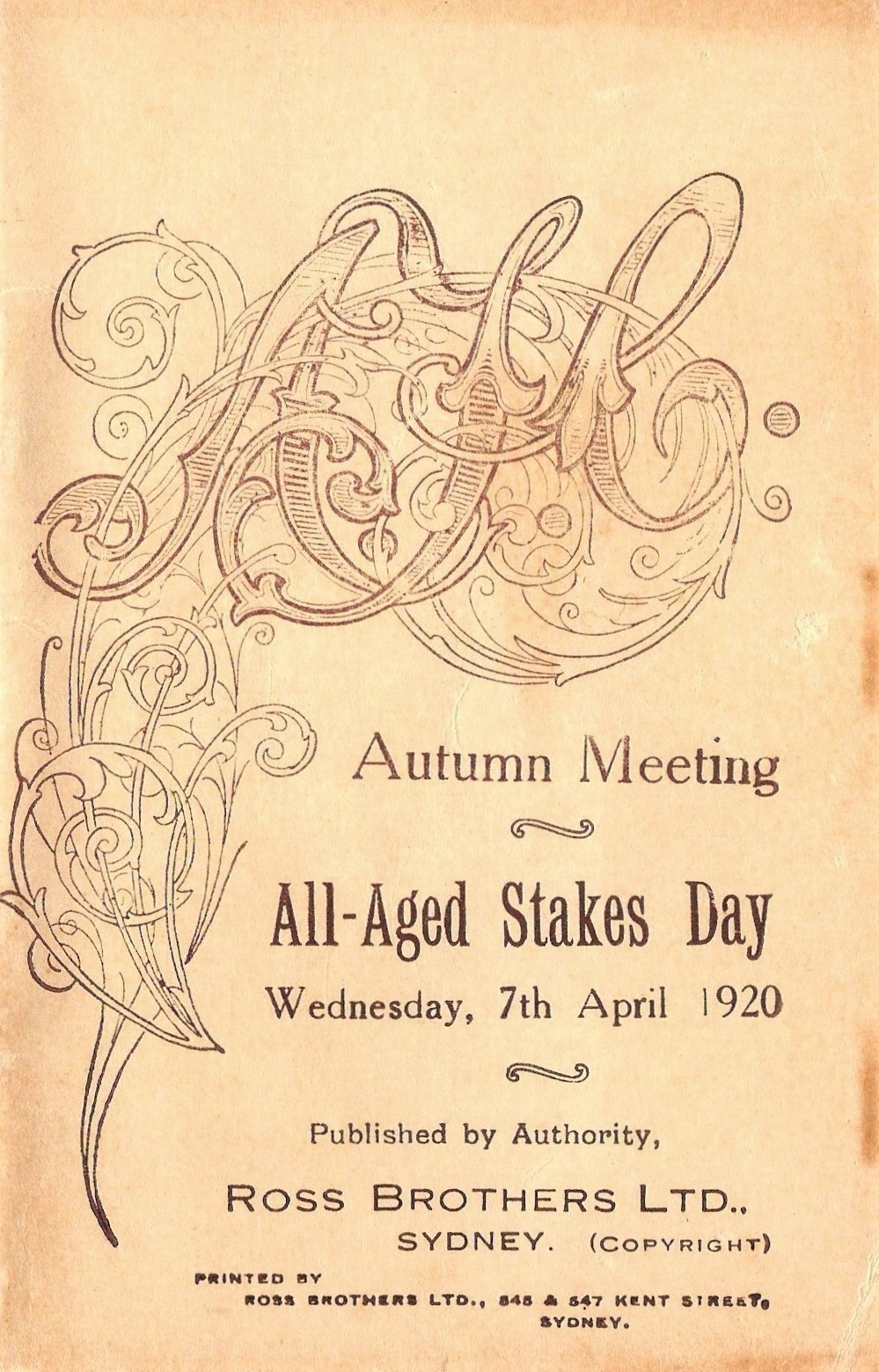
1920 AJC All- Aged Stakes racebook front cover

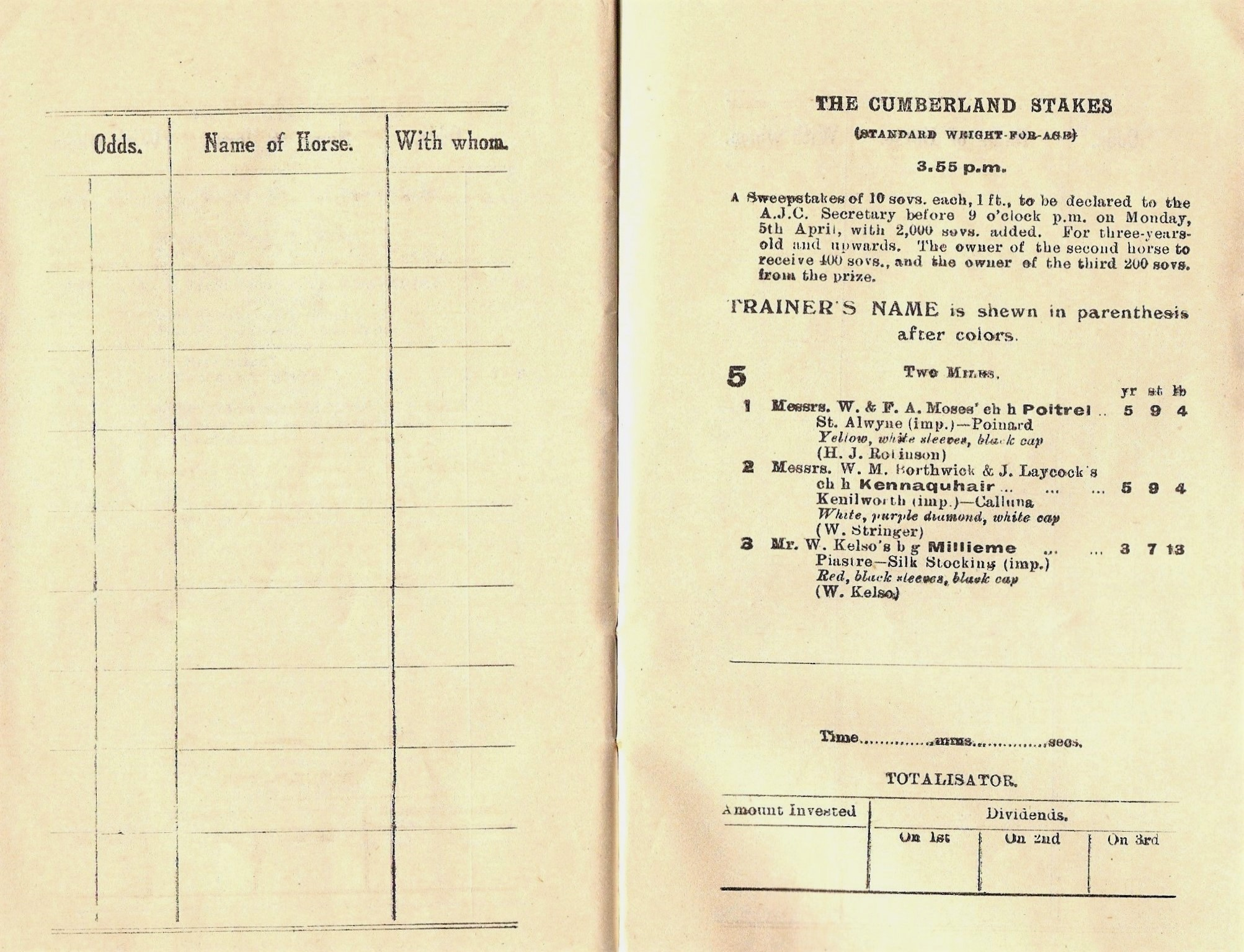
1920 AJC Cumberland Stakes page showing the winner, Poitrel

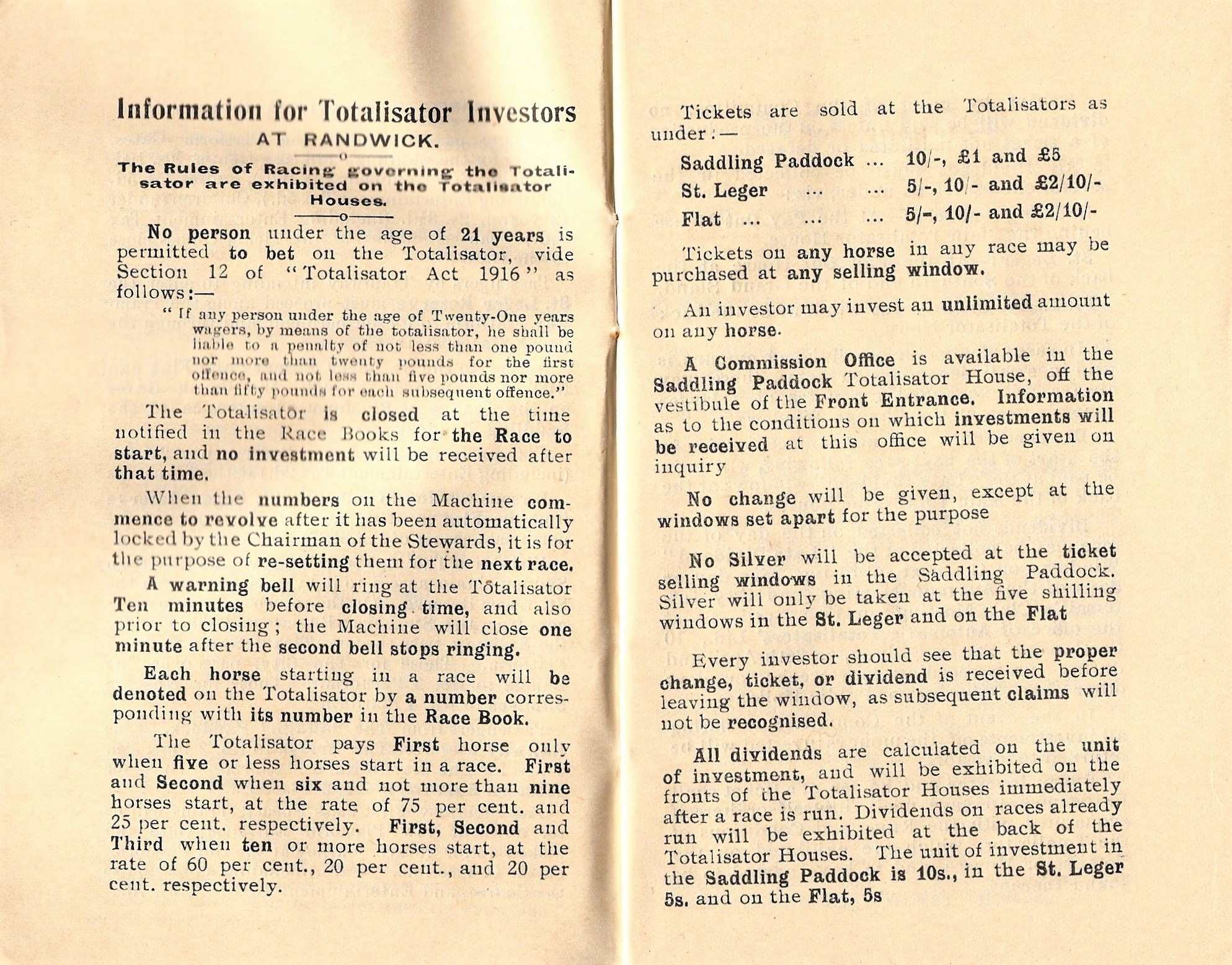
1920 AJC Cumberland Stakes page information for totalisator investors

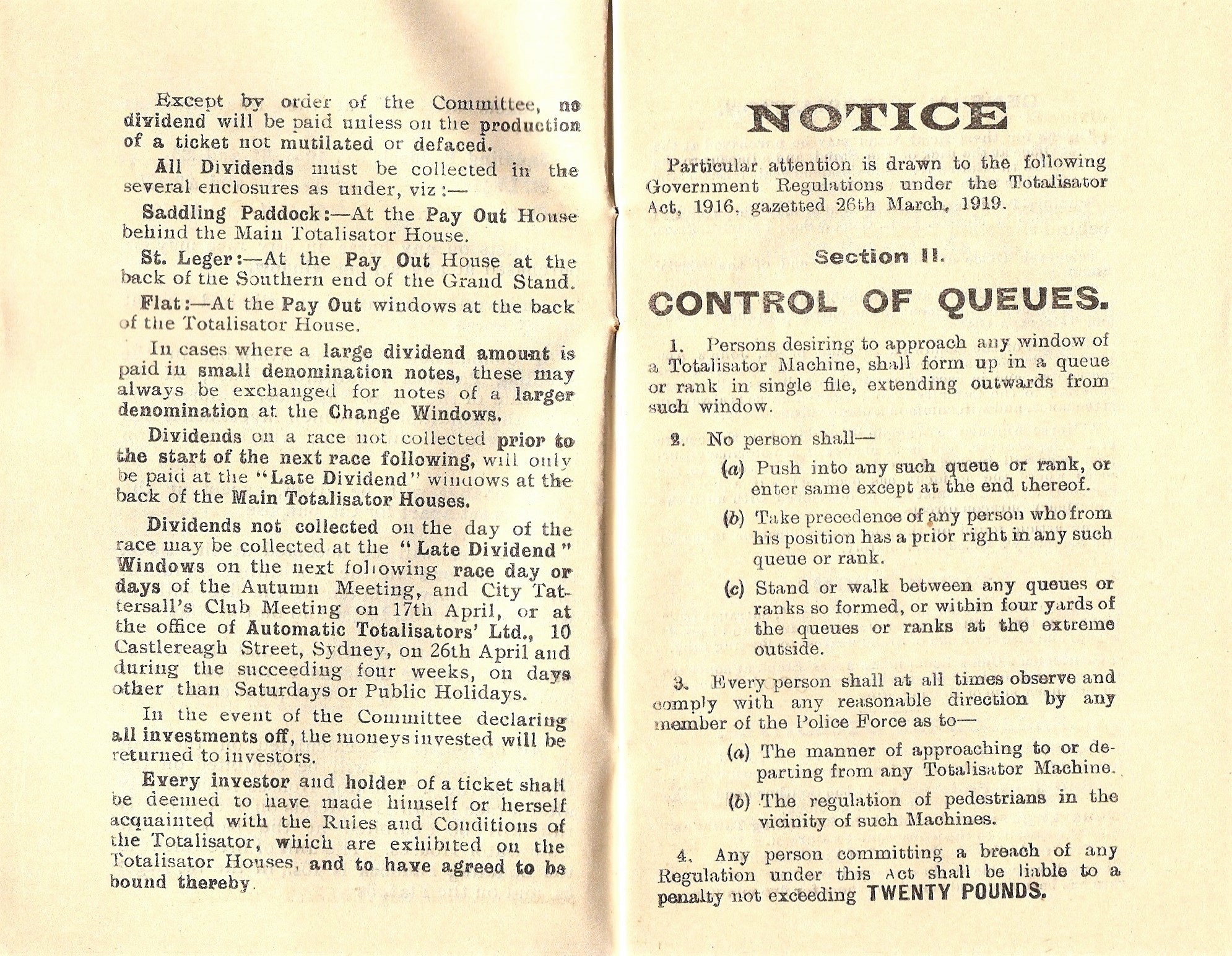
1920 AJC Cumberland Stakes page control of queues notice

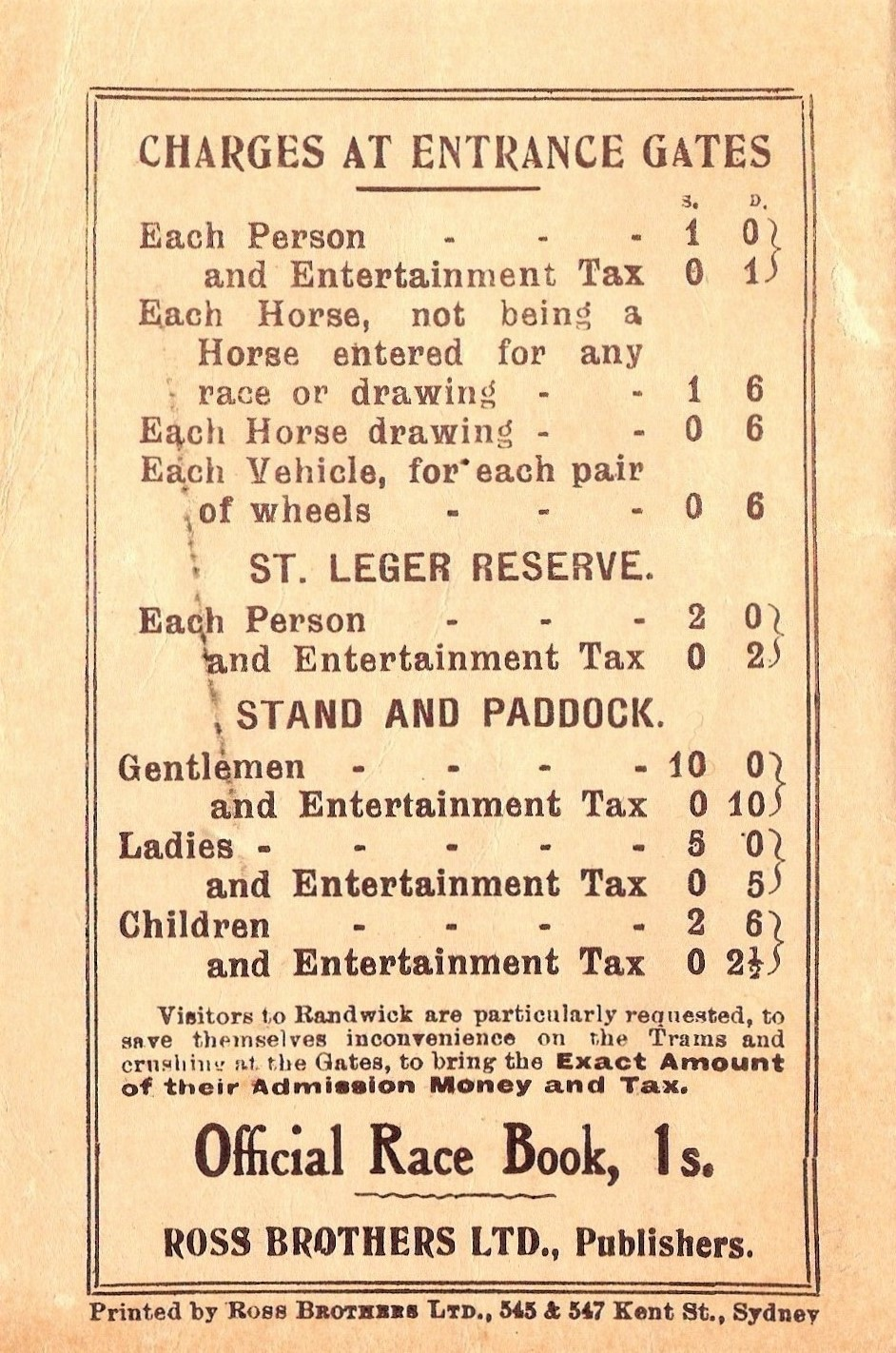
Back cover showing charges at the entrance gates
