= Festival Stakes =

Festival Stakes may refer to:

- Festival Stakes (ATC), a Group 3 horse race run at Rosehill Racecourse, Australia
- Festival Stakes (Great Britain), a Listed horse race run at Goodwood Racecourse, England
