= Ottawa Stakes =

- Class: Group 3
- Location: Flemington Racecourse
- Inaugurated: 1978 (Listed Race)
- Race type: Thoroughbred
- Sponsor: Darley (2020-25)

Race information
- Distance: 1,000 metres
- Surface: Turf
- Track: Straight
- Qualification: Two year old fillies
- Weight: Set weights – 55 1/2kg.
- Purse: $200,000 (2026)

The Ottawa Stakes, is a Victoria Racing Club Group 3 Australian Thoroughbred horse race for two-year-old fillies, run at set weights, over a distance of 1,000 metres at Flemington Racecourse, Melbourne, Australia in March. The event was originally held during the VRC Spring Carnival. From 2020 it was moved from Melbourne Cup day to the Thursday Oaks Day.

== History ==
Prior to 2005 the event was held on the third day of the VRC Spring Carnival.

The event was moved from November to February in 2025.

Recent multiple winners include:

Trainers

- Gai Waterhouse and Adrian Bott as trainers in 2016 and 2017
- Robbie Laing trained the winner in 2009 and 2010

Jockeys

- Damian Lane in 2023 and 2024
- Craig Williams in 2007, 2009, 2010 and 2022.

=== Name ===
- Prior to 1985 - Ottawa Stakes
- 1986–1990 - race not held
- 1991–1993 - Beck's Bier Stakes
- 1994–1997 - Neat N' Trim Uniforms Stakes
- 1998 - Dr. Le Winn's Sprint
- 1999 - Toyota Victoria Stakes
- 2000 - New Honda Civic Stakes
- 2001 - Subaru Stakes
- 2002–2003 - Adams Platform Stakes
- 2004 - Myer Stakes
- 2005 - Ritzenhoff Stakes
- 2006 - Jayco Stakes
- 2007 - Herald Sun Sprint
- 2008 - Schiavello Stakes
- 2009 - AGL Renewable Energy Stakes
- 2010 - AGL Solar Power Stakes
- 2011 - Emirates Airplane Plate
- 2012–2013 - 7 News Stakes
- 2014–2015 - Emirates Airplane Plate
- 2016 - Ottawa Stakes
- 2017 - Emirates 100th A380 Stakes
- 2018 - Bumble Stakes
- 2019 - Darley Ottawa Stakes

=== Distance ===
- 1978–1979 – 1000 metres
- 1980 – 1100 metres
- 1981–1985 – 1200 metres
- 1991 onwards - 1000 metres

=== Grade ===
- 1978 - Principal Race
- 1979–2012 - Listed Race
- 2013 onwards - Group 3

== Winners ==
The following are past winners of the race.

- 2026 - Medicinal
- 2025 - Military Tycoon
- 2024 - race not held
- 2023 - Eneeza
- 2022 - Charm Stone
- 2021 - See You In Heaven
- 2020 - Dosh
- 2019 - Aryaaf
- 2018 - Bella Rosa
- 2017 - Setsuna
- 2016 - Invincible Star
- 2015 - Concealer
- 2014 - Antelucan
- 2013 - Oakleigh Girl
- 2012 - Villa Verde
- 2011 - Applegate
- 2010 - Spectrolite
- 2009 - She's Got Gears
- 2008 - Rostova
- 2007 - Hips Don't Lie
- 2006 - Royal Asscher
- 2005 - Follow The Till
- 2004 - Red Hot Mama
- 2003 - Flying Firebird
- 2002 - Rinky Dink
- 2001 - Flashed
- 2000 - True Jewels
- 1999 - Tennessee Midnight
- 1998 - Dance Baby Dance
- 1997 - Rosa's Joy
- 1996 - Canon Song
- 1995 - Bright Light
- 1994 - Tennessee Magic
- 1993 - Duchess Katrin
- 1992 - Lady Jakeo
- 1991 - Chingquillo
- 1990 - race not held
- 1989 - race not held
- 1988 - race not held
- 1987 - race not held
- 1986 - race not held
- 1985 - Harbour Island
- 1984 - Beach Gown
- 1983 - Catalina Queen
- 1982 - Convamore's Delight
- 1981 - Royal Billie
- 1980 - Sharp Walk
- 1979 - Our Ranee Sahib
- 1978 - Stage Hit

† Run in Divisions

== See also ==
- List of Australian Group races
- Group races
