= Schweppervescence Trophy =

Matron Stakes
- Class: Group 3
- Location: Flemington Racecourse
- Inaugurated: 1994
- Race type: Thoroughbred
- Sponsor: De Bortoli Wines (2026)

Race information
- Distance: 1,600 metres
- Surface: Turf
- Qualification: Fillies and mares, three year old and older
- Weight: Set weights with penalties
- Purse: $200,000 (2026)

The Matron Stakes is a Victoria Racing Club Group 3 Australian Thoroughbred horse race held under set weight conditions with penalties, for fillies and mares aged three years old and upwards, over a distance of 1600 metres at Flemington Racecourse in Melbourne, Australia in March during the VRC Autumn Racing Carnival.

== History ==
The race has had changes in grade and name. In 2007 the race was run at Sandown Racecourse.

Recent multiple winners are:

Trainers

- Danny O'Brien in 2002, 2009 and 2021.

Jockeys

- Ben Melham in 2012, 2023 and 2026.
- Damien Oliver in 2002, 2007 and 2009.
- Craig Williams in 2006, 2008, 2010, 2015, 2018.

=== Grade ===
- 1994–2005 - Listed Race
- 2006 onwards - Group 3

=== Race names ===
- 1994–2008 - Matron Stakes
- 2009 - Patinack Farm Stakes
- 2011 onwards - Schweppervescence Trophy

The Schweppervescence Trophy from 2006–2010 was the race name for the registered race Frances Tressady Stakes.

=== Distance ===
- 1994 – 1616 metres
- 1995 – 1623 metres
- 1996 – 1600 metres
- 1997 – 1617 metres
- 1998 – 1635 metres
- 1999 – 1606 metres
- 2000 onwards - 1600 metres

== Winners ==
The following are past winners of the race.

- 2026 - Ahha Ahha
- 2025 - Jennilala
- 2024 - Eternal Flame
- 2023 - Sirileo Miss
- 2022 - Flying Mascot
- 2021 - Sovereign Award
- 2020 - Paint The Town Two
- 2019 - Spanish Reef
- 2018 - Spanish Reef
- 2017 - Circular
- 2016 - Felicienne
- 2015 - Noble Protector
- 2014 - Bonaria
- 2013 - Bonaria
- 2012 - Spirit Song
- 2011 - Pinker Pinker
- 2010 - Response
- 2009 - Fifth Avenue Lady
- 2008 - Translate
- 2007 - Like It Is
- 2006 - Umber
- 2005 - Uprize
- 2004 - Ruling Eyes
- 2003 - Lady Knockout
- 2002 - La Zoffany
- 2001 - Lady Marion
- 2000 - Dance The Night
- 1999 - Noircir
- 1998 - Miss Tessla
- 1997 - French Resort
- 1996 - Jadeva Belle
- 1995 - Aunty Mary
- 1994 - Excited Angel

== See also ==
- List of Australian Group races
- Group races
