= Kembla Grange Classic =

Kembla Grange Classic registered as the Keith F Nolan Classic
- Class: Group 3
- Location: Kembla Grange Racecourse
- Inaugurated: 2003 (Listed Race)
- Race type: Thoroughbred - flat
- Sponsor: PFD Food Services (2026)

Race information
- Distance: 1,600 metres
- Surface: Turf
- Track: Right-handed
- Qualification: Three year old fillies
- Weight: Set weights with penalties
- Purse: A$250,000 (2026)

The Kembla Grange Classic, registered as the Keith F Nolan Classic, is an Illawarra Turf Club Group 3 Thoroughbred horse race, for three-year-old fillies, at set weights with penalties, over a distance of 1600 metres, held annually at Kembla Grange Racecourse in New South Wales, Australia in March.

== History ==
The registered race is named after Keith F. Nolan, founding chairman of the Illawarra Turf Club and was instrumental in saving the Kembla Grange racecourse and establishing it as one of the premier provincial race tracks in New South Wales. The Illawarra Turf Club named a new grandstand after him - the Keith F. Nolan Stand - and named a feature race, the Keith F. Nolan Classic. Keith F. Nolan died in 2005 at the age of 76.

Recent multiple winners include:

Jockeys

- Kerrin McEvoy in 2017, 2018 and 2025.

Trainers

- Guy Walter in 2008, 2010, 2012 and 2014.
- Gai Waterhouse in 2005 and 2006 as well as in partnership with Adrian Bott in 2026.

=== Name ===
- 2003–2015 - Keith F Nolan Classic
- 2016 - Arrowfield Kembla Grange Classic

=== Grade ===
- 2003–2009 - Listed Race
- 2010 onwards - Group 3

=== Venue ===
The 2011 race was run at Rosehill Gardens Racecourse after the scheduled race meeting at Kembla Grange was abandoned due to the track condition. The distance of the race at Rosehill was 1800 metres.

The 2022 race was run at Goulburn Racecourse.

== Winners ==
The following are past winners of the race.

- 2026 - Feminino
- 2025 - Verona Rose
- 2024 - Queen Of Dragons
- 2023 - Pavitra
- 2022 - Pretty Amazing
- 2021 - Miravalle
- 2020 - Asiago
- 2019 - Pohutukawa
- 2018 - Luvaluva
- 2017 - Dawn Wall
- 2016 - Single Gaze
- 2015 - Slightly Sweet
- 2014 - Zanbagh
- 2013 - Cameo
- 2012 - Appearance
- 2011 - Brazilian Pulse
- 2010 - Slapstick
- 2009 - Allez Wonder
- 2008 - Bernicia
- 2007 - Hot Danish
- 2006 - Pasikatera
- 2005 - Ponte Piccolo
- 2004 - La Nikita
- 2003 - Ain't Seen Nothin'

== See also ==
- List of Australian Group races
- Group races
