= Aspiration Quality =

- Class: Group 3
- Location: Randwick Racecourse
- Inaugurated: 2006
- Race type: Thoroughbred
- Sponsor: Mostyncopper - https://mostyncopper.com.au/

Race information
- Distance: 1,600 metres
- Surface: Turf
- Track: Right-handed
- Qualification: Fillies and mares three years old and older
- Weight: Quality handicap
- Purse: $250,000 (2025)

The Aspiration Quality is an Australian Turf Club Group 3 Thoroughbred quality handicap horse race, for fillies and mares aged three-years-old and upwards, over a distance of 1600 metres at Randwick Racecourse in Sydney, Australia in March.

== History ==
The race has been held on the Randwick Guineas race card since inception.

Nettoyer, trained by Wendy Roche, won the 2019 and 2020 editions of the race as well as the 2020 Doncaster Mile. Joseph Pride trained the winners in 2010, 2015 and 2024.

=== Grade ===
- 2006–2013 - Listed race
- 2014 onwards - Group 3

=== Venue ===
- 2006–2010 - Randwick Racecourse
- 2011 - Warwick Farm Racecourse
- 2012 - Randwick Racecourse
- 2013 - Warwick Farm Racecourse
- 2014 onwards - Randwick Racecourse

== Winners ==
The following are winners of the race.

- 2026 - Pinito
- 2025 - Little Baia
- 2024 - Lekvarte
- 2023 - Thalassophile
- 2022 - Le Lude
- 2021 - Missybeel
- 2020 - Nettoyer
- 2019 - Nettoyer
- 2018 - Karavali
- 2017 - Elle Lou
- 2016 - Heavens Above
- 2015 - Adorabeel
- 2014 - Diamond Drille
- 2013 - Thy
- 2012 - Fibrillation
- 2011 - Warpath
- 2010 - Sacred Choice
- 2009 - Illuminates
- 2008 - Pravana
- 2007 - Banc De Fortune
- 2006 - Lord Of The Land

== See also ==
- List of Australian Group races
- Group races
