= Maurice McCarten Stakes =

Something creative

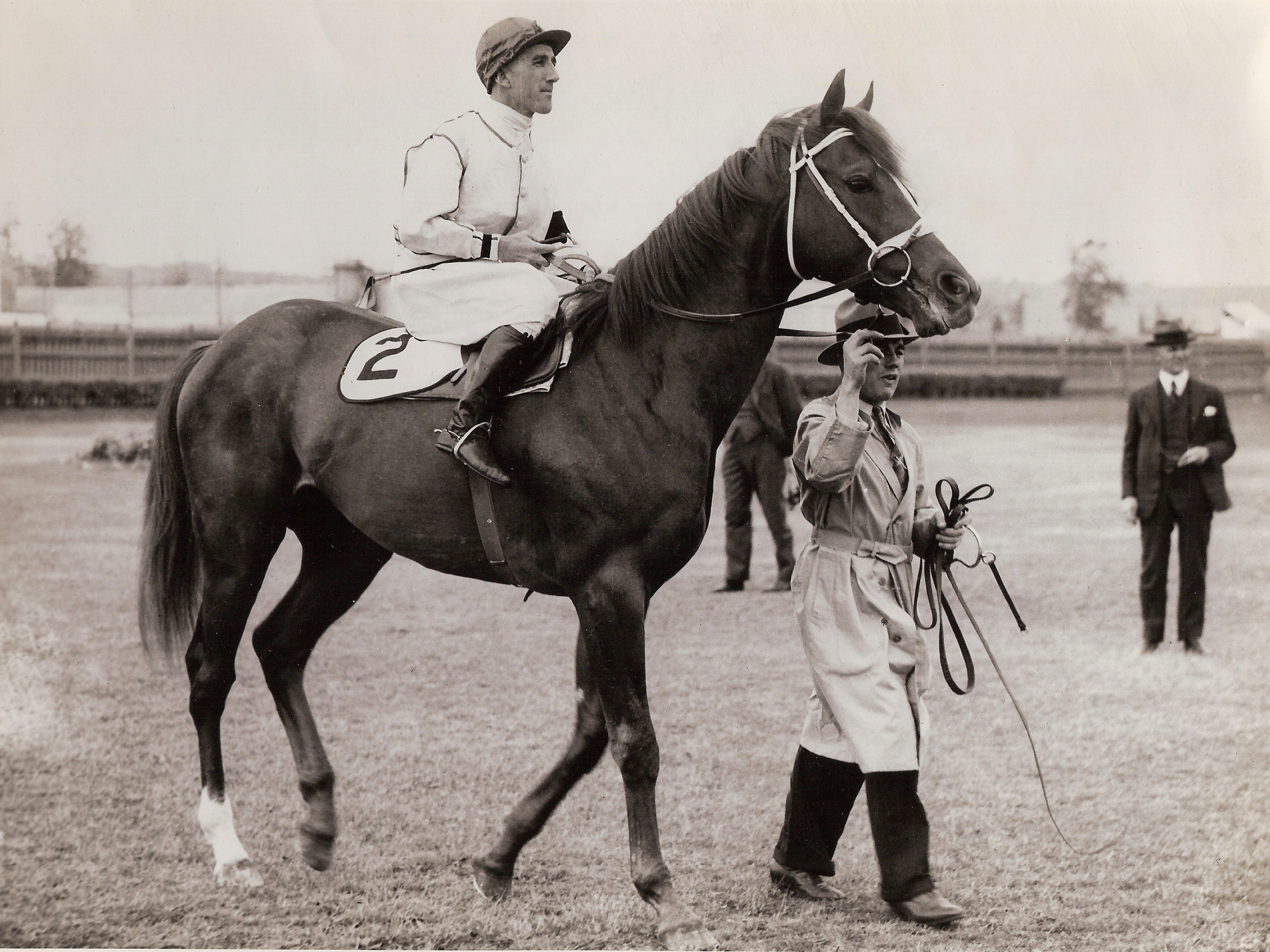
- Maurice McCarten
- Class: Group 3
- Location: Rosehill Gardens Racecourse
- Inaugurated: 1993
- Race type: Thoroughbred
- Sponsor: Toyota Forklifts (2026)

Race information
- Distance: 1,100 metres
- Surface: Turf
- Track: Right-handed
- Qualification: Horses three years old and over
- Weight: Quality handicap
- Purse: $250,000 (2026)

The Maurice McCarten Stakes is an Australian Turf Club Group 3 Thoroughbred quality handicap horse race, for three years old and older, over a distance of 1100 metres at Rosehill Gardens Racecourse in Sydney, Australia in March.

== History ==
The race is named in honour of jockey and racehorse-trainer Maurice Thomas Joseph McCarten (1902–1971).

Prior to 2010 the race was held on the Golden Slipper race card.

=== Name ===
- 1993–1996 - The Moet & Chandon Handicap
- 1997–1998 - The Moet & Chandon
- 1999–2002 - Moet & Chandon Stakes
- 2003–2004 - Maurice McCarten Stakes
- 2005–2009 - The Schweppervesence
- 2010–2011 - Maurice McCarten Stakes
- 2012 - Bacardi Together Stakes
- 2013 - Bacardi World's No.1 Rum Stakes
- 2014 - Bacardi Untameable Stakes
- 2015 onwards - Maurice McCarten Stakes

=== Distance ===
- 1993–2009 - 1200 metres
- 2010 - 1100 metres

=== Grade ===
- 1993–2013 - Listed race
- 2014 onwards - Group 3

== Winners ==
The following are past winners of the race.

- 2026 - Flying For Fun
- 2025 - Eagle Nest
- 2024 - Red Card
- 2023 - Cannonball
- 2022 - Shelby Sixtysix
- 2021 - California Zimbol
- 2020 - Star Of The Seas
- 2019 - Easy Eddie
- 2018 - ‡Dothraki
- 2017 - Artistry
- 2016 - Alberto Magic
- 2015 - Target In Sight
- 2014 - Kencella
- 2013 - See The World
- 2012 - Title
- 2011 - Atomic Force
- 2010 - Welkom Gold
- 2009 - Mount Verde
- 2008 - Hoystar
- 2007 - Double Dare
- 2006 - Snippetson
- 2005 - Britt's Best
- 2004 - Mustard
- 2003 - Sex Machine
- 2002 - Crete
- 2001 - †Stanzaic / Knickerbocker Kid
- 2000 - Antiquity
- 1999 - Appoint
- 1998 - Appoint
- 1997 - Quick Flick
- 1996 - Identikit
- 1995 - Magic Of Money
- 1994 - Brawny Spirit
- 1993 - Friend's Venture

† Dead heat
‡ Won on Protest

== See also ==
- List of Australian Group races
- Group races
