= List of Australian Group races =

This List of Australian Group races is recognized as a list of Australia's classified Black type thoroughbred horse races.

The Pattern Committee of the Australian Racing Board (ARB) recommends which races shall be designated as Group and Listed races for the racing season.

== Group 1, 2, & 3 and other notable races ==
This table may be sorted by clicking on the symbol at the top of any column.

Race name	Group	Stakes (Note: Stakes displayed are in Australian Dollars)	Age	Sex	Weight	Distance (Note: Distance displayed are in metres)	Racecourse	State	Date	Winner
A D Hollindale Stakes	2	$500,000	3YO+	Open	wfa	1800	Gold Coast	QLD	2026-05-09	Pride Of Jenni
A J Moir Stakes	1	$750,000	3YO+	Open	wfa	1000	Moonee Valley / Sandown	VIC	2026-09-05	My Gladiola
The Gold Rush (A J Scahill Stakes)	3	$1,500,000	3YO+	Open	wfa	1400	Ascot	WA	2025-12-13	Rey Magnerio
A.V Kewney Stakes	2	$300,000	3YO	Fillies	sw	1600	Flemington	VIC	2026-03-07	Sass Appeal
Adelaide Cup	2	$350,000	Open	Open	hcp	3200	Morphettville	SA	2026-03-09	American Wolf
Adrian Knox Quality Stakes	3	$250,000	3YO	Fillies	qlty	2000	Randwick	NSW	2026-04-04	Profoundly
Ajax Stakes	2	$300,000	3YO+	Open	qlty	1500	Rosehill	NSW	2026-03-14	Cristal Clear
Alan Brown Stakes	3	$1,500,000	3YO+	Open	qlty	1400	Rosehill	NSW	2026-10-10	Formal Display
Alexandra Stakes	3	$200,000	3YO	Fillies	sw+p	1600	Moonee Valley / Caulfield	VIC	2026-03-21	Getta Good Feeling
Alister Clark Stakes	2	$500,000	3YO	Open	sw	2040	Moonee Valley / Caulfield	VIC	2026-03-21	Roulette King
All Aged Stakes	1	$1,500,000	Open	Open	wfa	1400	Randwick	NSW	2026-04-18	Beiwacht
All-Star Mile	1	$2,500,000	Open	Open	wfa	1600m	Flemington	VIC	2026-03-07	Tom Kitten
Angst Stakes	3	$500,000	4YO+	Mares	sw+p	1600	Randwick	NSW	2026-10-17	Unleeshing
Angus Armanasco Stakes	2	$300,000	3YO	Fillies	sw	1400	Caulfield	VIC	2026-02-21	Sheza Alibi
Apollo Stakes	2	$300,000	3YO+	Open	wfa	1400	Randwick	NSW	2026-02-14	Autumn Glow
Arrowfield 3yo Sprint	2	$1,000,000	3YO	Open	sw	1200	Randwick	NSW	2026-04-11	Tempted
Asian Beau Stakes	3	$200,000	3YO+	Open	hcp	1400	Ascot	WA	2026-10-31	Hot And High
Aspiration Quality	3	$250,000	3YO+	F&M	qlty	1600	Randwick	NSW	2026-03-07	Pinito
Australian Derby	1	$2,000,000	3YO	Open	sw	2400	Randwick	NSW	2026-04-06	Green Spaces
Australian Oaks	1	$1,000,000	3YO	Fillies	sw	2400	Randwick	NSW	2026-04-11	Ohope Wins
Aurie's Star Handicap	3	$200,000	Open	Open	hcp	1200	Flemington	VIC	2026-08-01	Boomtown Boss
Australia Stakes	2	$350,000	3YO+	Open	wfa	1200	Moonee Valley / Pakenham	VIC	2026-01-23	Hedged
Australian Cup	1	$2,000,000	3YO+	Open	wfa	2000	Flemington	VIC	2026-03-28	Light Infantry Man
Australian Guineas	1	$1,000,000	3YO	Open	sw	1600	Flemington	VIC	2026-02-28	Observer
Autumn Stakes	2	$300,000	3YO	Open	sw+p	1400	Caulfield	VIC	2026-02-07	Observer
B J McLachlan Stakes	3	$300,000	2YO	Open	sw	1200	Eagle Farm	QLD	2025-12-27	Zip Lock
Begonia Belle Stakes (Asahi Super Dry Sprint)	3	$240,000	4YO+	Mares	sw+p	1100	Flemington	VIC	2026-10-31	Flying For Fun
Belle Of The Turf Stakes	3	$300,000	3YO+	F&M	qlty	1600	Gosford	NSW	2025-12-28	Kind Words
Belmont Sprint	3	$200,000	Open	Open	wfa	1400	Belmont	WA	2026-05-16	Western Empire
Bendigo Cup	3	$500,000	Open	Open	hcp	2400	Bendigo	VIC	2026-10-28	So You Are
Bill Ritchie Handicap	3	$250,000	3YO+	Open	qlty	1400	Randwick	NSW	2026-09-19	General Salute
Bill Stutt Stakes	2	$300,000	3YO	Open	sw	1600	Moonee Valley / Caulfield	VIC	2026-09-27	Diameter
Birthday Card Stakes	3	$250,000	3YO+	F&M	qlty	1200	Rosehill	NSW	2026-03-21	Catch The Glory
Black Opal Stakes	3	$200,000	2YO	Open	sw+p	1200	Canberra	ACT	2026-03-08	Music Time
Blamey Stakes	2	$300,000	3YO+	Open	sw+p	1600	Flemington	VIC	2026-02-28	Birdman
Bletchingly Stakes	3	$200,000	Open	Open	wfa	1200	Caulfield	VIC	2026-07-25	Cosmic Crusader
Blue Diamond Prelude C&G	3	$350,000	2YO	C&G	sw	1100	Caulfield	VIC	2026-02-07	Closer To Free
Blue Diamond Prelude Fillies	2	$350,000	2YO	Fillies	sw	1100	Caulfield	VIC	2026-02-07	Streisand
Blue Diamond Preview Fillies	3	$250,000	2YO	Fillies	sw+p	1000	Caulfield	VIC	2026-01-24	Rubi's Choice
Blue Diamond Stakes	1	$2,000,000	2YO	Open	sw	1200	Caulfield	VIC	2026-02-21	Streisand
Blue Sapphire Stakes	3	$250,000	3YO	Open	sw	1200	Caulfield	VIC	2026-10-17	Marffiano
Bobbie Lewis Quality	2	$300,000	4YO+	Open	qlty	1200	Flemington	VIC	2026-09-12	Losesomewinmore
Mystic Journey Stakes	3	$150,000	3YO+	F&M	wfa	1200	Elwick	TAS	2026-02-08	Sanniya
BRC Sprint	3	$300,000	Open	Open	qlty	1350	Doomben	QLD	2026-05-23	Abounding
Breeders' Plate	3	$250,000	2YO	C&G	sw	1000	Randwick	NSW	2026-10-03	Flying Houdini
SA Breeders' Stakes	3	$150,000	2YO	Open	sw	1200	Morphettville	SA	2026-04-25	Verzain
Brisbane Cup	2	$400,000	3YO+	Open	qlty	2400	Eagle Farm	QLD	2026-06-13	Alalcance
C.F. Orr Stakes	1	$1,000,000	Open	Open	wfa	1400	Sandown	VIC	2026-11-14	Shadhavar
Cameron Handicap	3	$250,000	Open	Open	hcp	1500	Newcastle	NSW	2026-09-18	Fully Lit
Canonbury Stakes	3	$250,000	2YO	C&G	sw+p	1100	Rosehill	NSW	2026-01-31	Hidrix
VRC Champions Mile	1	$3,000,000	Open	Open	WFA	1600	Flemington	VIC	2026-11-07	Autumn Glow
Canterbury Stakes	1	$750,000	3YO+	Open	wfa	1300	Randwick	NSW	2026-03-07	Joliestar
Cap D'Antibes Stakes	3	$200,000	3YO	Fillies	sw+p	1100	Flemington	VIC	2026-09-12	Satono Glow
Carbine Club Stakes (ATC)	3	$250,000	3YO	Open	sw+p	1600	Randwick	NSW	2026-04-04	Autumn Break
Carbine Club Stakes (VRC)	3	$500,000	3YO	Open	sw+p	1600	Flemington	VIC	2026-10-31	The Roaring Sun
MRC Foundation Cup (Carlyon Cup)	3	$200,000	Open	Open	sw+p	1600	Caulfield	VIC	2026-02-07	Light Infantry Man
Carlyon Stakes (Spring Preview)	3	$200,000	3YO+	Open	sw+p	1000	Sandown	VIC	2026-08-22	Cavalry Girl
Caulfield Autumn Classic	2	$300,000	3YO	Open	sw	1800	Caulfield	VIC	2026-02-21	Single Choice
Caulfield Classic	3	$240,000	3YO	Open	sw+p	2000	Caulfield	VIC	2026-10-17	King Snitz
Caulfield Cup	1	$6,545,000	3YO+	Open	hcp	2400	Caulfield	VIC	2026-10-17	Kingswood
Caulfield Guineas	1	$3,000,000	3YO	Open	sw	1600	Caulfield	VIC	2026-10-10	Warwoven
Caulfield Guineas Prelude	3	$300,000	3YO	C&G	sw+p	1400	Caulfield	VIC	2026-09-19	Blind Raise
Caulfield Sprint	2	$300,000	Open	Open	hcp	1000	Caulfield	VIC	2026-10-17	Cavalry Girl
Might and Power Stakes	1	$1,002,000	3YO+	Open	wfa	2000	Caulfield	VIC	2026-10-10	Land Legend
Chairman's Handicap (ATC)	2	$300,000	3YO+	Open	qlty	2600	Randwick	NSW	2026-04-04	Newlook
Chairman's Handicap (BRC)	3	$200,000	3YO+	Open	qlty	2000	Doomben	QLD	2026-05-16	Middle Earth
Chairman's Stakes (MRC)	3	$200,000	2YO	Open	sw+p	1000	Caulfield	VIC	2026-01-31	Big Sky
Chairman's Stakes (SAJC)	3	$150,000	3YO	Open	sw	2000	Morphettville	SA	2026-04-25	Impulsive Reaction
Challenge Stakes	2	$500,000	3YO+	Open	wfa	1000	Randwick	NSW	2026-03-07	Generosity
Champagne Classic (BRC)	2	$300,000	2YO	Open	sw	1200	Doomben	QLD	2026-05-16	Vantorix
Champagne Stakes	1	$1,000,000	2YO	Open	sw	1600	Randwick	NSW	2026-04-18	Fireball
Rising Fast Stakes (Chatham Stakes)	3	$240,000	Open	Open	hcp	1200	Flemington	VIC	2026-10-31	Ndola
Chautauqua Stakes	3	$200,000	Open	Open	hcp	1300	Moonee Valley / Sandown	VIC	2026-09-09	Warnie
Chelmsford Stakes	2	$300,000	3YO+	Open	wfa	1600	Randwick	NSW	2026-09-05	Lindermann
Chipping Norton Stakes	1	$1,000,000	3YO+	Open	wfa	1600	Randwick	NSW	2026-02-28	Autumn Glow
Colin Stephen Quality Handicap	3	$250,000	3YO+	Open	qlty	2400	Rosehill	NSW	2026-09-26	So You Are
Colonel Reeves Stakes	3	$200,000	3YO+	Open	sw+p	1100	Ascot	WA	2026-11-14	Oscar's Fortune
Concorde Stakes	2	$1,000,000	3YO+	Open	sw+p	1000	Randwick	NSW	2026-09-05	Tempted
Coolmore Classic	1	$1,000,000	3YO+	F&M	qlty	1500	Rosehill	NSW	2026-03-14	Lazzura
Queen of the Turf Stakes (Coolmore Legacy Stakes)	1	$1,000,000	3YO+	F&M	wfa	1600	Randwick	NSW	2026-04-11	Idle Flyer
Coolmore Stud Stakes	1	$2,000,000	3YO	Open	sw	1200	Flemington	VIC	2026-10-31	The Next Episode
Coongy Handicap	3	$240,000	Open	Open	hcp	2000	Caulfield	VIC	2026-10-14	Zirtab
Craven Plate	3	$750,000	3YO+	Open	wfa	1800	Randwick	NSW	2026-10-24	Lindermann (x3)
Crystal Mile (Kia Ora Stud Mile)	2	$400,000	3YO+	Open	wfa	1600	Moonee Valley / Flemington	VIC	2026-10-24	Surfin' Bird
C S Hayes Stakes	3	$200,000	3YO	C&G	sw+p	1400	Flemington	VIC	2026-02-14	Sixties
Dane Ripper Stakes	2	$300,000	Open	F&M	sw+p	1300	Eagle Farm	QLD	2026-06-13	She's Got Pizzazz
Danehill Stakes	2	$300,000	3YO	Open	sw+p	1200	Flemington	VIC	2026-10-03	The Next Episode
Dark Jewel Classic	3	$250,000	Open	F&M	qlty	1400	Scone	NSW	2026-05-16	Tuileries
Behemoth Stakes (David R Coles AM Spring Stakes)	3	$150,000	Open	Open	wfa	1200	Morphettville	SA	2026-08-08	Sir Now
John Hawkes Stakes (D C McKay Stakes)	3	$150,000	3YO+	Open	qlty	1100	Morphettville	SA	2026-04-25	Grand Larceny
Doncaster Mile	1	$4,000,000	3YO+	Open	hcp	1600	Randwick	NSW	2026-04-04	Sheza Alibi
Doncaster Prelude	3	$250,000	3YO+	Open	qlty	1500	Rosehill	NSW	2026-03-28	Welwal
Doomben 10,000	1	$1,500,000	3YO+	Open	wfa	1200	Doomben	QLD	2026-05-16	Rothfire
Doomben Cup	1	$1,000,000	3YO+	Open	wfa	2000	Doomben	QLD	2026-05-23	Birdman
The Roses (Doomben Roses)	2	$300,000	3YO	Fillies	sw	2000	Doomben	QLD	2026-05-23	Fireball Miss
Easter Cup	3	$200,000	Open	Open	hcp	2000	Caulfield	VIC	2026-04-04	Ambassadorial
Eclipse Stakes	3	$200,000	3YO+	Open	qlty	1800	Caulfield	VIC	2025-11-29	Casino Seventeen
Edward Manifold Stakes	2	$300,000	3YO	Fillies	sw	1600	Flemington	VIC	2026-10-03	Saintly Dancer
Emancipation Stakes	2	$300,000	3YO+	F&M	sw+p	1500	Rosehill	NSW	2026-03-28	Idle Flyer
Epona Stakes	3	$250,000	3YO+	F&M	sw+p	1900	Rosehill	NSW	2026-03-21	Machine Gun Gracie
Epsom Handicap	1	$1,500,000	3YO+	Open	hcp	1600	Randwick	NSW	2026-10-03	God's Window
Eskimo Prince Stakes	3	$250,000	3YO	Open	sw+p	1200	Randwick	NSW	2026-02-07	Tempted
Ethereal Stakes	3	$240,000	3YO	Fillies	sw+p	2000	Caulfield	VIC	2026-10-17	Quick Finish
Tobin Bronze Stakes (Euclase Stakes)	2	$250,000	3YO	Open	sw	1200	Morphettville	SA	2026-04-25	Tycoon Star
Expressway Stakes	2	$300,000	3YO+	Open	wfa	1200	Randwick	NSW	2026-02-14	Joliestar
Festival Stakes	3	$250,000	3YO+	Open	qlty	1500	Rosehill	NSW	2025-11-29	Yorkshire
Flight Stakes	1	$750,000	3YO	Fillies	sw	1600	Randwick	NSW	2026-10-03	Global Goal
Frances Tressady Stakes	3	$200,000	3YO+	F&M	sw+p	1400	Flemington	VIC	2026-02-14	Paradise City
Frank Packer Plate	3	$250,000	3YO	Open	sw	2000	Randwick	NSW	2026-04-18	Matias
Fred Best Classic	3	$300,000	3YO	Open	sw	1400	Eagle Farm	QLD	2026-05-30	Regal Award
Five Diamonds	3	$2,000,000	5YO	Open	sw+p	1800	Rosehill	NSW	2026-11-07	Evaporate
Furious Stakes	2	$300,000	3YO	Fillies	sw	1200	Randwick	NSW	2026-09-05	Bangkok Hottie
Futurity Stakes	1	$750,000	3YO+	Open	wfa	1400	Caulfield	VIC	2026-02-21	Pericles
Geelong Cup	3	$500,000	Open	Open	hcp	2400	Geelong	VIC	2026-10-21	Point of Law
Geoffrey Bellmaine Stakes	3	$200,000	4YO+	Mares	sw+p	1200	Caulfield	VIC	2026-01-31	Wrote To Arataki
King Charles III Stakes (George Main Stakes)	1	$5,000,000	3YO+	Open	wfa	1600	Randwick	NSW	2026-10-17	Autumn Glow
George Moore Stakes	3	$200,000	Open	Open	qlty	1200	Doomben	QLD	2025-12-05	Caballus
George Ryder Stakes	1	$1,000,000	3YO+	Open	wfa	1500	Rosehill	NSW	2026-03-21	Autumn Glow
Gilgai Stakes	2	$300,000	3YO+	Open	sw+p	1200	Flemington	VIC	2026-10-03	Skybird
Gimcrack Stakes (ATC)	3	$250,000	2YO	Fillies	sw	1000	Randwick	NSW	2026-10-03	Shraddha
Gimcrack Stakes (PR)	3	$200,000	2YO	Fillies	sw+p	1100	Ascot	WA	2026-04-04	Aurum Belle
Magic Millions Fillies & Mares Mile (Glenlogan Park Stakes)	3	$200,000	Open	F&M	sw+p	1300	Doomben	QLD	2026-05-23	Pinito
Gloaming Stakes	3	$500,000	3YO	Open	sw	1800	Rosehill	NSW	2026-10-10	Proxima Dea
The Gong	3	$1,000,000	3YO+	Open	qlty	1600	Kembla Grange	NSW	2026-11-21	Gringotts (x3)
Hawkesbury Crown	3	$250,000	3YO+	F&M	sw+p	1300	Hawkesbury	NSW	2026-05-02	Chidiac
Gold Coast Guineas	3	$200,000	3YO	Open	sw	1200	Gold Coast	QLD	2026-05-09	Beadman
Golden Eagle	1	$10,000,000	4yo	Open	sw	1500	Randwick	NSW	2026-10-31	Skyhook
Golden Pendant	2	$400,000	3YO+	F&M	sw+p	1400	Rosehill	NSW	2026-09-26	Lazzura
Golden Rose Stakes	1	$1,000,000	3YO	Open	sw	1400	Rosehill	NSW	2026-09-26	Warwoven
Golden Slipper Stakes	1	$5,000,000	2YO	Open	sw	1200	Rosehill	NSW	2026-03-21	Guest House
Grand Prix Stakes	3	$300,000	3YO	Open	sw	2200	Eagle Farm	QLD	2025-12-20	Matias
Gunsynd Classic	3	$200,000	3YO	Open	sw	1600	Eagle Farm	QLD	2026-06-13	Skyhook
Guy Walter Stakes (Wiggle Stakes)	2	$300,000	4YO+	Mares	sw+p	1400	Randwick	NSW	2026-02-28	Verona Rose
H E Tancred Stakes (The BMW)	1	$1,500,000	3YO+	Open	wfa	2400	Rosehill	NSW	2026-03-28	Aeliana
Hall Mark Stakes	3	$250,000	3YO+	Open	sw+p	1200	Randwick	NSW	2026-04-18	Mazu
Hawkesbury Gold Cup	3	$250,000	3YO+	Open	hcp	1600	Hawkesbury	NSW	2026-05-02	Churchill's Choice
Hawkesbury Guineas	3	$250,000	3YO	Open	sw+p	1400	Hawkesbury	NSW	2026-05-02	Skyhook
HDF McNeil Stakes	3	$200,000	3YO	Open	sw+p	1200	Caulfield	VIC	2026-08-29	American Eagle
Heritage Stakes	3	$250,000	3YO	Open	sw+p	1100	Rosehill	NSW	2026-09-26	Blue Door
Herbert Power Stakes	2	$400,000	3YO+	Open	qlty	2400	Caulfield	VIC	2026-10-10	Pinhole
Hill Stakes	2	$2,000,000	3YO+	Open	wfa	2000	Rosehill	NSW	2026-10-10	Attrition
Hong Kong Jockey Club Stakes (Maybe Mahal Stakes)	3	$240,000	4YO+	Mares	sw+p	1400	Flemington	VIC	2026-11-03	Shadhavar
Hobart Cup	3	$250,000	Open	Open	hcp	2400	Elwick	TAS	2026-02-08	Blonde Star
Hobartville Stakes	2	$400,000	3YO	Open	sw	1400	Rosehill	NSW	2026-02-21	Ninja
Hot Danish Stakes	2	$500,000	3YO+	F&M	sw	1400	Rosehill	NSW	2026-11-07	Lazzura
How Now Stakes	3	$200,000	4YO+	Mares	sw+p	1200	Caulfield	VIC	2026-09-19	Point Barrow
Hyperion Stakes	3	$200,000	3YO+	Open	wfa	1600	Belmont	WA	2026-05-30	Western Empire
Inglis Sires'	1	$1,000,000	2YO	Open	sw	1400	Randwick	NSW	2026-04-04	Campione D'italia
J.J. Atkins	1	$1,000,000	2YO	Open	sw	1600	Eagle Farm	QLD	2026-06-13	Tron Bolt
James H B Carr Stakes	3	$250,000	3YO	Fillies	sw+p	1400	Randwick	NSW	2026-04-18	Snitzel Dancer
Japan Racing Association Plate	3	$250,000	3YO+	Open	qlty	2000	Randwick	NSW	2026-04-18	Asterix
John F. Feehan Stakes	2	$500,000	3YO+	Open	wfa	1600	Moonee Valley / Caulfield	VIC	2026-09-27	Pride Of Jenni
JRA Cup	3	$200,000	Open	Open	qlty	2040/2000	Moonee Valley / Caulfield	VIC	2026-09-27	Royal Supremacy
Karrakatta Plate	2	$500,000	2YO	Open	sw	1200	Ascot	WA	2026-04-18	Afireofgidgeecoals
Kembla Grange Classic	3	$250,000	3YO	Fillies	sw+p	1600	Kembla Grange	NSW	2026-03-13	Feminino
Ken Russell Memorial Classic	3	$200,000	2YO	Open	sw	1350	Gold Coast	QLD	2026-05-09	St Gotthard
Peter Le Grand Stakes (Kevin Hayes Stakes)	3	$200,000	3YO	Fillies	sw+p	1200	Caulfield	VIC	2026-02-07	Alpha Sofie
Kevin Heffernan Stakes	3	$200,000	3YO+	Open	wfa	1300	Caulfield	VIC	2026-02-07	Tom Kitten
Kindergarten Stakes	3	$250,000	2YO	Open	sw	1100	Randwick	NSW	2026-04-04	Blue Door
Kingsford-Smith Cup	1	$1,000,000	Open	Open	wfa	1300	Eagle Farm	QLD	2026-05-30	Headley Grange
Northerly Stakes (formerly the Kingston Town Classic)	1	$1,500,000	3YO+	Open	wfa	1800	Ascot	WA	2025-12-06	Cosmic Crusader
Kingston Town Stakes	2	$300,000	3YO+	Open	sw+p	2000	Randwick	NSW	2026-09-19	The Euphrates
La Trice Classic	3	$200,000	3YO+	F&M	sw+p	1800	Ascot	WA	2026-01-01	Luvnwar
Ladies Day Vase	3	$160,000	4YO+	Mares	sw+p	1600	Caulfield	VIC	2026-10-10	Surfin' Bird
Launceston Cup	3	$250,000	Open	Open	hcp	2400	Mowbray	TAS	2026-02-25	Asva
Let's Elope Stakes	2	$300,000	4YO+	Mares	sw+p	1400	Flemington	VIC	2026-09-12	Pondalowie
Lexus Archer Stakes	3	$300,000	3YO+	Open	qlty	2500	Flemington	VIC	2026-09-12	Shockletz
Light Fingers Stakes	2	$300,000	3YO	Fillies	sw	1200	Randwick	NSW	2026-02-14	Savvy Hallie
Black Caviar Lightning	1	$1,000,000	Open	Open	wfa	1000	Flemington	VIC	2026-02-14	Tentyris
The Damien Oliver (Linlithgow Stakes)	2	$500,000	3YO+	Open	hcp	1200	Flemington	VIC	2026-10-31	Private Eye
Liverpool City Cup	3	$250,000	3YO+	Open	qlty	1300	Randwick	NSW	2026-02-28	King Of Roseau
Lord Mayor's Cup	3	$200,000	3YO+	Open	qlty	1600	Eagle Farm	QLD	2026-05-30	Athanatos
Lord Reims Stakes	3	$150,000	3YO+	Open	sw+p	2600	Morphettville	SA	2026-02-21	Eventually
Champions Stakes (Mackinnon Stakes)	1	$3,000,000	Open	Open	wfa	2000	Flemington	VIC	2026-11-07	Birdman
Magic Night Stakes	3	$250,000	2YO	Fillies	sw	1200	Rosehill	NSW	2026-03-14	Pembrey
Makybe Diva Stakes	1	$750,000	3YO+	Open	wfa	1600	Flemington	VIC	2026-09-12	Sheza Alibi
Manfred Stakes	3	$200,000	3YO	Open	sw+p	1200	Caulfield	VIC	2026-01-24	Space Rider
Manikato Stakes	1	$2,000,000	3YO+	Open	wfa	1200	Moonee Valley / Caulfield	VIC	2026-09-27	Jimmysstar
Mannerism Stakes	3	$200,000	4YO+	Mares	sw+p	1400	Caulfield	VIC	2026-02-21	Bossy Benita
Maribyrnong Plate	3	$240,000	2YO	Open	sw	1000	Flemington	VIC	2026-11-03	Amelia's Affair
Matriarch Stakes	2	$300,000	4YO+	Mares	sw+p	2000	Flemington	VIC	2026-11-07	Sun Gift
Maurice McCarten Stakes	3	$250,000	3YO+	Open	qlty	1100	Rosehill	NSW	2026-03-14	Flying for Fun
McEwen Stakes	2	$300,000	Open	Open	wfa	1200	Moonee Valley / Flemington	VIC	2026-10-24	Smooth Chino
Melbourne Cup	1	$10,200,000	3YO+	Open	hcp	3200	Flemington	VIC	2026-11-03	Point of Law
Memsie Stakes	1	$750,000	3YO+	Open	wfa	1400	Caulfield	VIC	2026-08-29	Beiwacht
Millie Fox Stakes	2	$300,000	3YO+	F&M	sw+p	1300	Rosehill	NSW	2026-02-21	Cinsault
Ming Dynasty Quality Handicap	3	$250,000	3YO	Open	qlty	1400	Rosehill	NSW	2026-09-12	Persian Wonder
Missile Stakes	2	$300,000	3YO+	Open	sw+p	1200	Randwick	NSW	2026-08-08	Ninja
Moonee Valley Fillies Classic	2	$300,000	3YO	Fillies	sw	1600	Moonee Valley	VIC	2025-10-25 (not held 2026)	Salty Pearl
Moonee Valley Gold Cup	2	$750,000	4YO+	Open	sw+p	2500	Moonee Valley / Flemington	VIC	2026-10-24	Juja Kibo
Moonee Valley Vase (Drummond Golf Vase)	2	$400,000	3YO	Open	sw	2040	Moonee Valley / Flemington	VIC	2026-10-24	True Rebel
Harry White Stakes (Moonga Stakes)	3	$240,000	4YO+	Open	sw+p	1400	Caulfield	VIC	2026-10-17	War Machine
Moreton Cup (QTC Cup)	2	$300,000	Open	Open	qlty	1200	Eagle Farm	QLD	2026-06-06	Uncommon James
Empire Rose Stakes (Myer Classic)	1	$1,000,000	3YO+	F&M	wfa	1600	Flemington	VIC	2026-10-31	Lady Shenandoah
N E Manion Cup	3	$250,000	3YO+	Open	qlty	2400	Rosehill	NSW	2026-03-21	Mr Monaco
David Coles AM Stakes (National Stakes)	3	$150,000	2YO	Open	sw+p	1200	Morphettville	SA	2026-05-09	Brave Hustler
Naturalism Stakes	3	$200,000	Open	Open	qlty	2000	Caulfield	VIC	2026-09-19	Zahrann
Neville Sellwood Stakes	3	$300,000	4YO+	Open	sw+p	2000	Rosehill	NSW	2026-03-28	Wootton Verni
Newcastle Gold Cup	3	$300,000	3YO+	Open	hcp	2300	Newcastle	NSW	2026-09-18	Aethelwulf
Newcastle Stakes (Newcastle Newmarket)	3	$250,000	Open	Open	qlty	1400	Newcastle	NSW	2026-03-06	Tuileries
Newmarket Handicap	1	$1,500,000	Open	Open	hcp	1200	Flemington	VIC	2026-03-07	Caballus
Northam Stakes	3	$200,000	3YO+	Open	sw+p	1300	Northam	WA	2026-05-03	Smooth Chino
Eurythmic Stakes (formerly the Northerly Stakes)	3	$200,000	4YO+	Open	sw+p	1400	Ascot	WA	2026-10-17	King Of Light
Northwood Plume Stakes	3	$240,000	4YO+	Mares	sw+p	1200	Caulfield	VIC	2026-10-10	Point Barrow
Oakleigh Plate	1	$750,000	Open	Open	hcp	1100	Caulfield	VIC	2026-02-21	Tropicus
Ottawa Stakes	3	$200,000	2YO	Fillies	sw	1000	Flemington	VIC	2026-03-07	Medicinal
P B Lawrence Stakes	2	$300,000	3YO+	Open	wfa	1400	Caulfield	VIC	2026-08-15	Cosmic Crusader
P J Bell Stakes	3	$250,000	3YO	Fillies	sw+p	1200	Randwick	NSW	2026-04-04	Plaintiff
The Q22 (Eagle Farm Cup & P J O'Shea Stakes)	2	$1,200,000	3YO+	Open	wfa	2200	Eagle Farm	QLD	2026-06-13	Royal Supremacy
Pago Pago Stakes	3	$250,000	2YO	C&G	sw	1200	Rosehill	NSW	2026-03-14	Warwoven
Percy Sykes Stakes (Keith Mackay Handicap)	2	$1,000,000	2YO	Fillies	sw+p	1200	Randwick	NSW	2026-04-11	Cherry Bomshell
Perth Cup	2	$1,000,000	3YO+	Open	qlty	2400	Ascot	WA	2026-01-01	Apulia
Peter Young Stakes	2	$500,000	Open	Open	wfa	1800	Caulfield	VIC	2026-03-14	Birdman
Phar Lap Stakes	2	$300,000	3YO	Open	sw	1500	Rosehill	NSW	2026-03-14	Sixties
Poseidon Stakes	3	$200,000	3YO	C&G	sw+p	1100	Flemington	VIC	2026-09-12	Paradoxium
Premier's Cup (ATC)	3	$250,000	3YO+	Open	qlty	2000	Randwick	NSW	2026-08-22	Boniface
Premier's Cup (BRC)	3	$200,000	3YO+	Open	qlty	2200	Eagle Farm	QLD	2026-05-30	Alalcance
Premiere Stakes	2	$1,000,000	3YO+	Open	wfa	1200	Randwick	NSW	2026-10-03	Tempted
Prince of Wales Stakes	3	$200,000	3YO+	Open	wfa	1000	Ascot	WA	2026-10-31	Talkanco
Proud Miss Stakes	3	$150,000	3YO+	F&M	sw+p	1200	Morphettville	SA	2026-05-09	Naifah
Queen Elizabeth Stakes (ATC)	1	$5,000,000	3YO+	Open	wfa	2000	Randwick	NSW	2026-04-11	Sir Delius
Queen Elizabeth Stakes (VRC)	3	$300,000	3YO+	Open	qlty	2600	Flemington	VIC	2026-11-07	Pinhole
Queen Of The South Stakes	2	$250,000	3YO+	F&M	sw+p	1600	Morphettville	SA	2026-04-25	Cilacap
Queensland Derby	1	$1,000,000	3YO	Open	sw	2400	Eagle Farm	QLD	2026-05-30	Providence
Queensland Guineas	2	$350,000	3YO	Open	sw	1600	Eagle Farm	QLD	2026-05-02	Brave Monarch
Queensland Oaks	1	$700,000	3YO	Open	qlty	2400	Eagle Farm	QLD	2026-06-06	Fireball Miss
Quezette Stakes	3	$200,000	3YO	Fillies	sw+p	1100	Caulfield	VIC	2026-08-15	Natural Fling
The Quokka	Oth	$5,000,000	2YO+	Open	WFA	1200	Ascot	WA	2026-04-18	Jigsaw
The Cummings Stakes (R A Lee Stakes)	3	$220,000	Open	Open	sw+p	1600	Morphettville	SA	2026-05-09	Arran Bay
R J Peters Stakes	3	$200,000	3YO+	Open	hcp	1500	Ascot	WA	2026-11-14	Awesome Boy
R N Irwin Stakes	3	$150,000	3YO+	Open	wfa	1100	Morphettville	SA	2026-04-11	Super Smink
Railway Stakes	1	$1,500,000	3YO+	Open	qlty	1600	Ascot	WA	2026-11-21	Cosmic Crusader
Randwick Guineas	1	$1,000,000	3YO	Open	sw	1600	Randwick	NSW	2026-03-07	Sheza Alibi
Ranvet Stakes (Rawson Stakes)	1	$1,000,000	3YO+	Open	wfa	2000	Rosehill	NSW	2026-03-21	Aeliana
Red Anchor Stakes	3	$240,000	3YO	Open	sw+p	1200	Moonee Valley / Flemington	VIC	2026-10-24	Buggsy
Red Roses Stakes	3	$300,000	3YO	Fillies	sw+p	1100	Flemington	VIC	2026-11-05	Lady Catalina
Reginald Allen Quality	3	$250,000	3YO	Fillies	qlty	1400	Randwick	NSW	2026-10-17	Beyond The Reef
Reisling Stakes	2	$300,000	2YO	Fillies	sw	1200	Randwick	NSW	2026-03-07	Chayan
Roma Cup	3	$200,000	Open	Open	wfa	1200	Ascot	WA	2026-04-04	Rope Them In
Roman Consul Stakes	2	$300,000	3YO	Open	sw	1200	Rosehill	NSW	2026-10-10	Satono Glow
Rose Of Kingston Stakes	2	$300,000	4YO+	Mares	sw+p	1400	Flemington	VIC	2026-10-03	Stylish
Sydney Gold Cup (Rosehill Gold Cup)	Listed (prev. 3)	$750,000	3YO+	Opn	qlty	2000	Rosehill	NSW	2026-10-31	Travolta
Rosehill Guineas	1	$750,000	3YO	Open	sw	2000	Rosehill	NSW	2026-03-21	Autumn Boy
Rough Habit Plate	3	$250,000	3YO+	F&M	qlty	1200	Doomben	QLD	2026-05-16	Kilman
Rubiton Stakes	2	$300,000	3YO+	Open	sw+p	1100	Caulfield	VIC	2026-02-07	Oak Hill
The Russell Balding Stakes	2	$3,000,000	3YO+	Open	sw+p	1300	Randwick	NSW	2026-10-31	Pericles
SA Fillies Classic	3	$170,000	3YO	Fillies	sw	2500	Morphettville	SA	2026-05-09	Fringes
San Domenico Stakes	3	$250,000	3YO	Open	sw+p	1100	Rosehill	NSW	2026-08-29	Guest House
Sandown Guineas	2	$400,000	3YO	Open	sw	1600	Sandown	VIC	2026-11-14	Consulate
Sandown Stakes	3	$200,000	Open	Open	qlty	1500	Sandown	VIC	2025-09-27	Evaporate
Sapphire Stakes	2	$300,000	3YO+	F&M	sw+p	1200	Randwick	NSW	2026-04-11	In Flight
Scarborough Stakes	3	$200,000	3YO	Fillies	sw	1200	Moonee Valley / Caulfield	VIC	2026-09-27	Over The Bridge
Schillaci Stakes	2	$300,000	3YO+	Open	wfa	1100	Caulfield	VIC	2026-10-10	Jigsaw
Schweppervescence Stakes (Auraria Stakes)	3	$150,000	3YO	Fillies	sw+p	1800	Morphettville	SA	2026-04-11	Mating Call
Matron Stakes	3	$200,000	3YO+	F&M	sw+p	1600	Flemington	VIC	2026-03-07	Ahha Ahha
Australasian Oaks (Schweppes Oaks)	1	$1,000,000	3YO	Fillies	sw	2000	Morphettville	SA	2026-04-25	Panova
Seven Sunrise Stakes	2	$1,000,000	3YO+	Open	WFA	1600	Randwick	NSW	2026-09-19	Autumn Glow
Shaftesbury Avenue Handicap	3	$200,000	Open	Open	hcp	1400	Flemington	VIC	2026-03-07	Scheelite
Shannon Stakes	2	$300,000	3YO+	Open	qlty	1500	Rosehill	NSW	2026-09-26	Skyhook
Sheraco Stakes	2	$300,000	3YO+	F&M	sw+p	1200	Rosehill	NSW	2026-09-12	Savvy Hallie
Show County Quality Handicap	3	$250,000	3YO+	Open	qlty	1200	Randwick	NSW	2026-08-22	Midnight In Tokyo
Silver Eagle	L	$1,000,000	4YO	open	swp	1400	Randwick	NSW	2026-10-17	Apocalyptic
Silver Shadow Stakes	2	$300,000	3YO	Fillies	sw+p	1200	Randwick	NSW	2026-08-22	Pembrey
Silver Slipper Stakes	2	$300,000	2YO	Open	sw	1100	Rosehill	NSW	2026-02-21	Stretan Ruler
Sir John Monash Stakes	3	$200,000	Open	Open	wfa	1100	Caulfield	VIC	2026-07-11	Winnasedge
Sir Rupert Clarke Stakes	1	$1,000,000	3YO+	Open	hcp	1400	Caulfield	VIC	2026-09-19	Angel Capital
Sires' Produce Stakes (BRC)	2	$1,000,000	2YO	Open	sw	1400	Eagle Farm	QLD	2026-05-30	Berzelius
Sires' Produce Stakes (SAJC)	3	$150,000	2YO	Open	sw	1400	Morphettville	SA	2026-07-18	Neveu
Sires' Produce Stakes (VRC)	2	$300,000	2YO	Open	sw	1400	Flemington	VIC	2026-03-07	Grinzinger Heart
Sires' Produce Stakes (WA)	3	$200,000	2YO	Open	sw	1400	Ascot	WA	2026-05-02	Beatty
Sky High Stakes	3	$350,000	3YO+	Open	sw+p	2000	Rosehill	NSW	2026-03-14	Vauban
Skyline Stakes	2	$300,000	2YO	C&G	sw	1200	Randwick	NSW	2026-02-28	Camione D'italia
South Australian Derby	1	$1,000,000	3YO	Open	sw	2500	Morphettville	SA	2026-05-02	Wigmore
JRA Plate (Frederick Clissold Stakes)	3	$250,000	3YO+	Open	qlty	1200	Rosehill	NSW	2026-01-31	Willaidow
Spring Champion Stakes	1	$2,000,000	3YO	Open	sw	2000	Randwick	NSW	2026-10-24	Proxima Dea
Spring Stakes	3	$250,000	3YO	Open	sw	1600	Newcastle	NSW	2026-11-14	Katoto
Callander-Presnell (Stan Fox Stakes)	3	$1,000,000	3YO	Open	sw	1600	Randwick	NSW	2026-10-24	Central Europe
Standish Handicap	3	$200,000	Open	Open	hcp	1200	Flemington	VIC	2026-01-10	Disneck
Star Kingdom Stakes	3	$250,000	3YO+	Open	qlty	1200	Rosehill	NSW	2026-03-28	Roselyn's Star
St Leger Stakes (ATC)	3	$500,000	3yo+	Open	sw+p	2600	Randwick	NSW	2026-10-17	So You Are
Stradbroke Handicap	1	$3,000,000	Open	Open	qlty	1400	Eagle Farm	QLD	2026-06-13	Spicy Martini
Strickland Stakes	3	$200,000	3YO+	Open	wfa	2000	Belmont	WA	2026-06-13	Western Empire
Summer Cup	3	$250,000	3YO+	Open	qlty	2000	Randwick	NSW	2025-12-26	Tavi Time
Summoned Stakes	3	$200,000	4YO+	Mares	sw+p	1500	Sandown	VIC	2026-11-14	Concord Connie
Sunline Stakes	2	$300,000	3YO+	F&M	wfa	1600	Moonee Valley / Caulfield	VIC	2026-03-21	Treasurethe Moment
Winx Guineas (Sunshine Coast Guineas)	3	$300,000	3YO	Open	sw	1600	Corbould Park	QLD	2026-07-04	Cellarmaster
Surround Stakes	1	$750,000	3YO	Fillies	sw	1400	Randwick	NSW	2026-02-28	Tempted
Sweet Embrace Stakes	2	$300,000	2YO	Fillies	sw	1200	Randwick	NSW	2026-02-28	Spicy Miss
Sydney Cup	1	$2,000,000	3YO+	Open	hcp	3200	Randwick	NSW	2026-04-11	Changingoftheguard
Sydney Stakes	2	$2,000,000	3YO+	Open	wfa	1200	Randwick	NSW	2026-10-17	Grafterburners
T J Smith Stakes	1	$3,000,000	Open	Open	wfa	1200	Randwick	NSW	2026-04-04	Joliestar
T L Baillieu Handicap	3	$250,000	2YO	Open	qlty	1400	Rosehill	NSW	2026-03-28	Southend
Robert Sangster Stakes	1	$1,000,000	3YO+	F&M	wfa	1200	Morphettville	SA	2026-04-25	Geegees Mistruth
Tattersall's Cup	3	$200,000	Open	Open	qlty	2400	Eagle Farm	QLD	2026-06-27	Asterix
Tattersall's Tiara	1	$700,000	3YO+	F&M	wfa	1400	Eagle Farm	QLD	2026-06-27	Splash Back
Tea Rose Stakes	2	$300,000	3YO	Fillies	sw	1400	Randwick	NSW	2026-09-19	Bangkok Hottie
Ted Van Heemst Stakes	2	$300,000	3YO+	Open	wfa	2100	Ascot	WA	2025-12-20	Apulia
Tesio Stakes	3	$300,000	4YO+	Mares	hcp	2040	Moonee Valley / Flemington	VIC	2026-10-24	Soverato
The Bart Cummings	3	$350,000	Open	Open	qlty	2500	Flemington	VIC	2026-10-03	Mr Monaco
The Everest	1	$20,000,000	Invite	Open	wfa	1200	Randwick	NSW	2026-10-17	Tempted
The Galaxy	1	$1,000,000	3YO+	Open	hcp	1100	Rosehill	NSW	2026-03-21	Marhoona
The Goodwood	1	$1,000,000	3YO+	Open	sw+p	1200	Morphettville	SA	2026-05-09	Desert Lightning
The Heath 1100	3	$200,000	4YO+	Open	sw+p	1100	Caulfield	VIC	2026-08-29	Oliveanotherday
The Metropolitan	2	$750,000	3YO+	Open	hcp	2400	Randwick	NSW	2026-10-03	Juja Kibo
The Nivison	3	$250,000	4YO+	Mares	sw+p	1200	Rosehill	NSW	2026-10-10	Gerringong
The Run To The Rose	2	$300,000	3YO	Open	sw+p	1200	Rosehill	NSW	2026-09-12	Warwoven
The Shorts	2	$1,000,000	3YO+	Open	sw+p	1100	Randwick	NSW	2026-09-19	Mazu
The Vanity	3	$240,000	3YO	Fillies	sw+p	1400	Flemington	VIC	2026-10-31	Regal Ambition
Theo Marks Stakes	2	$300,000	3YO+	Open	qlty	1300	Rosehill	NSW	2026-09-12	Skyhook
Thoroughbred Breeders Stakes	3	$200,000	2YO	Fillies	sw+p	1200	Flemington	VIC	2026-03-28	Satono Glow
Thoroughbred Club Stakes (Maroona Handicap)	3	$1,000,000	3YO	Fillies	sw+p	1200	Sandown	VIC	2026-11-14	Natural Fling
The Thousand Guineas	1	$1,500,000	3YO	Fillies	sw	1600	Caulfield	VIC	2026-10-17	Saintly Dancer
Thousand Guineas Prelude (Tranquil Star Stakes)	2	$300,000	3YO	Fillies	sw+p	1400	Caulfield	VIC	2026-09-19	Icelady
Tibbie Stakes	3	$250,000	3YO+	F&M	sw+p	1400	Newcastle	NSW	2026-09-18	Perfumist
Todman Stakes (Todman Slipper Trial)	2	$300,000	2YO	C&G	sw	1200	Randwick	NSW	2026-03-07	Paradoxium
Toorak Handicap	1	$1,000,000	Open	Open	hcp	1600	Caulfield	VIC	2026-10-10	Lady Shenandoah
Toy Show Quality Handicap	3	$250,000	3YO+	F&M	qlty	1100	Randwick	NSW	2026-08-22	Prima Bella
Tramway Stakes	2	$300,000	3YO+	Open	sw+p	1400	Randwick	NSW	2026-09-05	Headley Grange
Triscay Stakes	3	$250,000	4YO+	Mares	qlty	1200	Randwick	NSW	2026-02-14	Weeping Woman
Tristarc Stakes	2	$300,000	4YO+	Mares	sw+p	1400	Caulfield	VIC	2026-10-17	Shadhavar
Tulloch Stakes	2	$300,000	3YO	C&G	sw	2000	Rosehill	NSW	2026-03-28	Storm Leopard
Turnbull Stakes	1	$750,000	4YO+	Open	sw+p	2000	Flemington	VIC	2026-10-03	Cosmic Crusader
Typhoon Tracy Stakes (Don Casboult Classic)	3	$200,000	3YO	Fillies	sw+p	1200	Moonee Valley / Caulfield	VIC	2026-03-21	Point Barrow
Underwood Stakes	1	$1,000,000	3YO+	Open	wfa	1800	Caulfield	VIC	2026-09-19	Birdman
Up And Coming Stakes	3	$250,000	3YO	Open	qlty	1300	Rosehill	NSW	2026-08-29	Plagiarism
Vain Stakes	3	$200,000	3YO	C&G	sw+p	1100	Caulfield	VIC	2026-08-15	Hard Kick
Vamos Stakes	3	$150,000	3YO+	F&M	wfa	1400	Mowbray	TAS	2026-02-25	Sanniya
Victoria Derby	1	$3,000,000	3YO	Open	sw	2500	Flemington	VIC	2026-10-31	Stormy Marco
Victoria Handicap	3	$200,000	Open	Open	hcp	1400	Caulfield	VIC	2026-04-04	Hughes
Victory Stakes	2	$300,000	3YO+	Open	wfa	1200	Eagle Farm	QLD	2026-05-02	Splash Back
The Ingham (Villiers Stakes)	2	$2,000,000	3YO+	Open	qlty	1600	Randwick	NSW	2025-12-13	Yorkshire
Vinery Stud Stakes (Storm Queen Stakes)	1	$750,000	3YO	Fillies	sw	2000	Rosehill	NSW	2026-03-28	Belle Cheval
Vo Rogue Plate	3	$300,000	3YO	Open	sw	1350	Doomben / Eagle Farm	QLD	2026-01-03	Ninja
VRC Oaks	1	$1,000,000	3YO	Fillies	sw	2500	Flemington	VIC	2026-11-05	Proxima Dea
VRC Champions Sprint (VRC Sprint Classic & Salinger Stakes)	1	$3,000,000	3YO+	Open	wfa	1200	Flemington	VIC	2026-11-07	Point Barrow
W H Stocks Stakes	2	$300,000	4YO+	Mares	wfa	1600	Moonee Valley / Caulfield	VIC	2026-09-27	Changing Colours
W J Healy Stakes	3	$200,000	Open	Open	qlty	1200	Eagle Farm	QLD	2026-06-27	Yellow Brick
W. S. Cox Plate	1	$6,000,000	3YO+	Open	wfa	2040	Moonee Valley / Flemington	VIC	2026-10-24	Cosmic Crusader
Courtza Stakes (W W Cockram Stakes)	3	$200,000	4YO+	Mares	sw+p	1200	Caulfield	VIC	2026-08-29	Custom
WA Champion Fillies Stakes	3	$300,000	3YO	Fillies	sw	1600	Ascot	WA	2026-11-14	Profit Motive
WA Guineas	2	$500,000	3YO	Open	sw	1600	Ascot	WA	2026-11-21	Beatty
WA Oaks	3	$300,000	3YO	Fillies	sw	2400	Ascot	WA	2026-04-01	Wonderfully Made
W.A.T.C. Derby	2	$400,000	3YO	Open	sw	2400	Ascot	WA	2026-04-11	Sentimental Legend
Wakeful Stakes	2	$300,000	3YO	Fillies	sw+p	2000	Flemington	VIC	2026-10-31	De Armas
Waroa-Lee Steere Stakes	2	$300,000	3YO+	Open	wfa	1400	Ascot	WA	2026-11-07	King Of Light
Wenona Girl Quality	3	$250,000	4YO+	Mares	qlty	1200	Randwick	NSW	2026-03-07	Gangsta Granny
Widden Stakes	3	$250,000	2YO	Fillies	sw+p	1100	Rosehill	NSW	2026-01-31	Chilly Girl
William Reid Stakes	1	$1,000,000	3YO+	Open	wfa	1200	Moonee Valley / Caulfield	VIC	2026-03-21	Jigsaw
Winterbottom Stakes	1	$1,150,000	3YO+	Open	wfa	1200	Ascot	WA	2025-11-29	Libertad
Winx Stakes (Warwick Stakes)	1	$1,000,000	3YO+	Open	wfa	1400	Randwick	NSW	2026-08-22	Autumn Glow
Zeditave Stakes	3	$200,000	3YO	Open	sw+p	1200	Caulfield	VIC	2026-02-21	Pallaton
Zipping Classic	2	$750,000	Open	Open	wfa	2400	Sandown	VIC	2026-11-14	Kingswood
The Kosciuszko	Oth	$2,000,000	Restricted	Open	sw+p	1200	Randwick	NSW	2026-10-17	Chains Of Love
The Invitation	Oth	$2,000,000	Invite	F&M	sw+p	1400	Randwick	NSW	2026-10-24	Lazzura
VRC St Leger	Oth	$200,000	3YO	Open	sw+p	2800	Flemington	VIC	2026-04-25	Silvasista

== Listed and other races ==
=== Listed races ===
There are over 280 grade 4 races which are known as Listed races. Along with Group races they are collectively referred to as "Black type" races. These races were generally known as "Principal races" until about 1979.

These include:

- G A Towton Cup, a 2200m race for horses aged three years old and upwards at Ascot Racecourse, Perth, Western Australia in December.
- Lee Steere Classic, a 1400m race for three-year-olds at set weights held at Ascot Racecourse in Perth, Western Australia each year in November.
- Magic Millions Classic, a 1200m race conducted under set weights that is restricted to two year old horses that were bought at a Magic Millions Sale auction. It is raced at the a Gold Coast Turf Club.
- Port Adelaide Cup, a 2500m race for horses aged three years old and over, at quality handicap conditions, at the Morphettville Racecourse, Adelaide, Australia in the Autumn Carnival. It was first run in 1906.
- Randwick City Stakes, a 2000m race for horses three years old and older. It is held annually at Randwick Racecourse in March.
- South Pacific Classic, a 1400m race for three-year-olds, at set weights. It is held annually at Randwick Racecourse in April.
- Tasmanian Derby, a 2200m race for three-year-olds at set weights at Elwick Racecourse in Glenorchy, in February.

=== Other races ===
Non-listed Australian thoroughbred races include:

- Burrumbeet Cup, a 1800 metre handicap race at the Burrumbeet racecourse, Burrumbeet, Victoria on New Year's Day every year.
- Geraldton Gold Cup a 2100m race held at Geraldton Racecourse, 435 km north of Perth, Western Australia. It was first run in 1887.

=== Jumping races ===
- Grand Annual
- Great Eastern Steeplechase

== See also ==
- Group races, the European equivalent
- Graded stakes race, the North American equivalent
- List of British flat horse races
- List of American and Canadian Graded races
- List of South American Group races
- Thoroughbred racing in New Zealand
