= A.V. Kewney Stakes =

Horse race in Melbourne, Victoria, Australia

A. V. Kewney Stakes raced as TAB Kewney Stakes
- Class: Group 2
- Location: Flemington Racecourse, Melbourne, Australia
- Inaugurated: 1952
- Race type: Thoroughbred
- Sponsor: TAB (2025)

Race information
- Distance: 1,400 metres
- Surface: Turf
- Qualification: Three year old fillies
- Weight: Set weights
- Purse: $300,000 (2025)

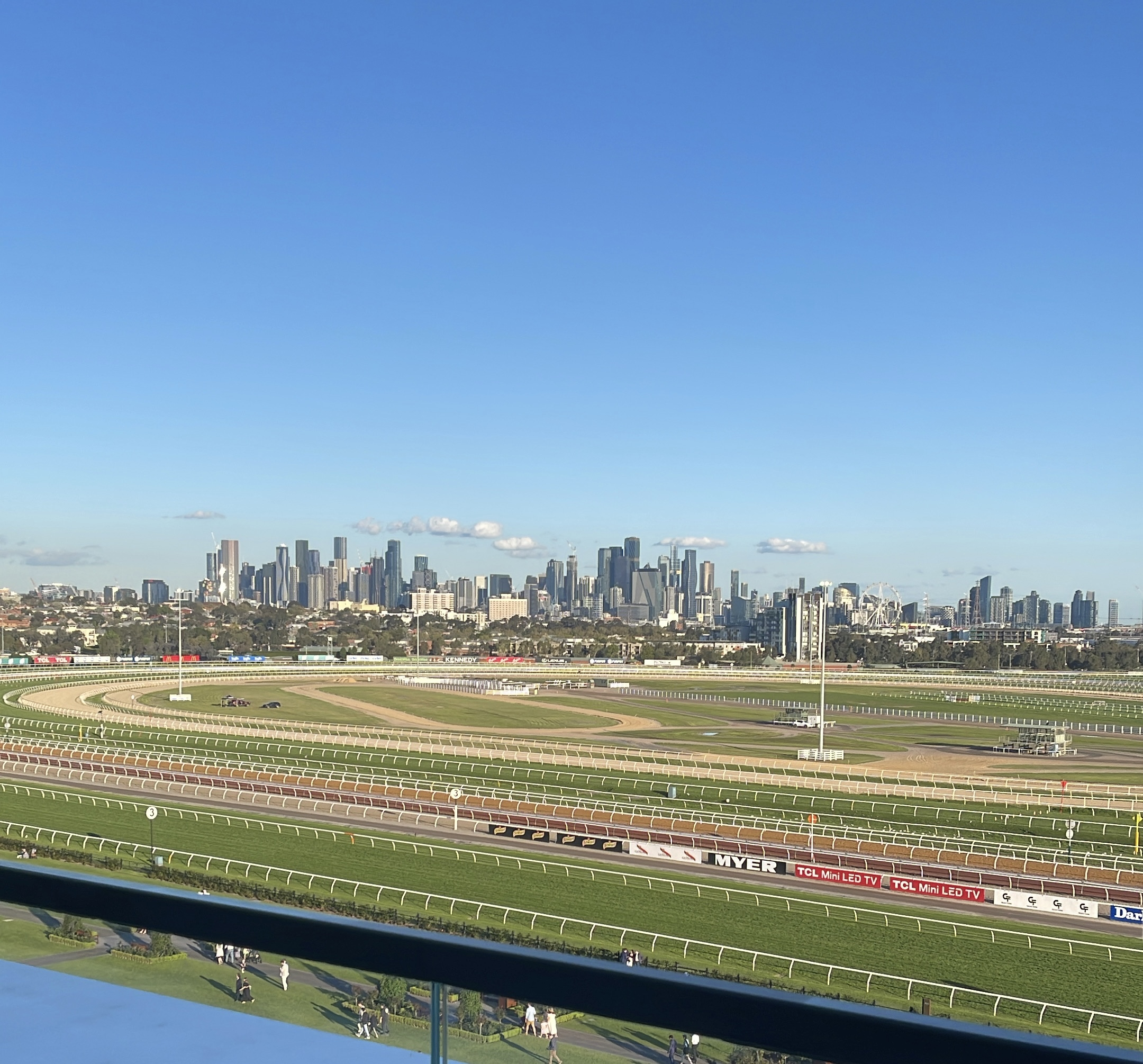
Flemington Racecourse, where the race is held

The A. V. Kewney Stakes is a Victoria Racing Club Group 2 Thoroughbred horse race for three-year-old fillies, run at set weights, over a distance of 1,600 metres at Flemington Racecourse, Melbourne, Australia in March during the VRC Autumn Racing Carnival.

== History ==
The race has had several changes in grade and distance. The race is named after Arthur V. Kewney, who was the Secretary of the Victoria Racing Club for 21 years retiring in 1946 at the age of 74.

=== Distance ===
- 1952–1972 - 1 1/4 miles (~2000 metres)
- 1973–1984 – 2000 metres
- 1985–2009 – 1600 metres
- 2010–2020 – 1400 metres
- 2021 onwards – 1600 metres

=== Grade ===
- 1952–1979 - Principal Race
- 1979 onwards - Group 2

=== Venue ===
In 2007 the race was run at Caulfield Racecourse due to reconstruction of Flemington Racecourse.

== Winners ==
Past winners of the race are as follows.

- 2026 - Sass Appeal
- 2025 - Treasurethe Moment
- 2024 - Autumn Angel
- 2023 - Revolutionary Miss
- 2022 - Barb Raider
- 2021 - Starelle
- 2020 - Rubisaki
- 2019 - Spanish Whisper
- 2018 - Bella Martini
- 2017 - I Am A Star
- 2016 - Badawiya
- 2015 - Wawail
- 2014 - Solicit
- 2013 - Flying Snitzel
- 2012 - Empress Rock
- 2011 - Do Re Mi
- 2010 - Faint Perfume
- 2009 - Gallica
- 2008 - Zarita
- 2007 - Anamato
- 2006 - Doubting
- 2005 - Ballet Society
- 2004 - Special Harmony
- 2003 - Lashed
- 2002 - Elegant Fashion
- 2001 - Ponton Flyer
- 2000 - Umaline
- 1999 - Sunline
- 1998 - Rose Of Danehill
- 1997 - Regal Crown
- 1996 - Eureka Jewel
- 1995 - Northwood Plume
- 1994 - Tristalove
- 1993 - Orsay
- 1992 - Tarare
- 1991 - Mannerism
- 1990 - Reganza
- 1989 - Pray For Colleen
- 1988 - Tennessee Vain
- 1987 - Send Me An Angel
- 1986 - Imperial Regina
- 1985 - Love A Kiss
- 1984 - Mapperley Heights
- 1983 - More Rain
- 1982 - Voli Dream
- 1981 - Deck The Halls
- 1980 - Bravita
- 1979 - Prunella
- 1978 - Sun Sally
- 1977 - In Pursuit
- 1976 - How Now
- 1975 - Cap D'antibes
- 1974 - Love Aloft
- 1973 - Sweet Vamp
- 1972 - Gossiper
- 1971 - Sanderae
- 1970 - Gay Poss
- 1969 - Cautious Sue
- 1968 - Lowland
- 1967 - Spell
- 1966 - Dual Quest
- 1965 - Whitsome
- 1964 - Swell
- 1963 - Marpyrean
- 1962 - Holiday
- 1961 - Miss Dante
- 1960 - Mintaway
- 1959 - Wiggle
- 1958 - Gay Satin
- 1957 - Sandara
- 1956 - Arbolado
- 1955 - Orbona
- 1954 - Waltzing Lady
- 1953 - Just Caroline
- 1952 - Great Field

== See also ==
- List of Australian Group races
- Group races
