= Dark Jewel Classic =

- Class: Group 3
- Location: Scone Racecourse, Scone, New South Wales, Australia
- Inaugurated: 1996
- Race type: Thoroughbred - flat
- Sponsor: Arrowfield (2025)

Race information
- Distance: 1,400 metres
- Surface: Turf
- Track: Right-handed
- Qualification: Fillies and mares
- Weight: Quality handicap
- Purse: A$250,000 (2025)

The Dark Jewel Classic is a Scone Race Club Group 3 Thoroughbred quality handicap horse race for fillies and mares, over a distance of 1400 metres, held at Scone Racecourse in Scone, New South Wales, Australia in May.

== History ==
The race is named after the mare Dark Jewel, who is considered one of the most prodigious post World War II Australian broodmares. She had eleven foals of which five were Group race winners (Baguette, Betelgeuse, Birthright, Cabochon and Heirloom).

The race is held in Scone, New South Wales in the Hunter Valley which is world renowned for the horse breeding farms in the area. The 2020 and 2021 events were held at Rosehill Racecourse due to the COVID-19 pandemic.

=== Grade ===
- 1999–2013 - Listed Race
- 2014 onwards - Group 3

=== Other venues ===
- 2020 & 2021 - Rosehill Racecourse

== Winners ==
The following are past winners of the race.

- 2026 - Tuileries
- 2025 - Melody Again
- 2024 - Fall For Cindy
- 2023 - More Prophets
- 2022 - Bring The Ransom
- 2021 - Rocha Clock
- 2020 - Irithea
- 2019 - Con Te Partiro
- 2018 - Siren's Fury
- 2017 - Daysee Doom
- 2016 - Danish Twist
- 2015 - Divertire
- 2014 - Seaside
- 2013 - Arctic Flight
- 2012 - Upon This Rock
- 2011 - Shannara
- 2010 - So Anyway
- 2009 - Rio Osa
- 2008 - Sung
- 2007 - Rosa’s Spur
- 2006 - Really Flying
- 2005 - Kosta Nothin'
- 2004 - Romare
- 2003 - Chuckle
- 2002 - Hot Riff
- 2001 - Nanny Maroon
- 2000 - Stella Marie
- 1999 - Little Pattie
- 1998 - Amber
- 1997 - Timeless Winds
- 1996 - Tripping

== See also ==
- List of Australian Group races
- Group races
