= Bendigo Cup =

- Class: Group 3
- Location: Bendigo Racecourse, Bendigo, Australia
- Inaugurated: 1868
- Race type: Thoroughbred
- Sponsor: Ladbrokes (2025 & 2026)

Race information
- Distance: 2,400 metres
- Surface: Turf
- Track: Left-handed
- Qualification: Open
- Weight: Handicap
- Purse: $500,000 (2026)

The Bendigo Cup, previously called the Sandhurst Cup, is a Bendigo Jockey Club Group 3 Thoroughbred horse race, held under handicap conditions over a distance of 2400 metres at the Bendigo Racecourse, Bendigo, Victoria, Australia on a Wednesday in late October or early November.

== History ==
=== Distance ===
- 1972–1993 – 2200 metres
- 1994–2008 – 2400 metres
- 2009–2010 – 2200 metres
- 2011 onwards – 2400 metres

=== Grade ===
- 1979–2014 – Listed race
- 2015 onwards – Group 3

== Winners ==
The following are past winners of the race.

- 2026 - So You Are
- 2025 - Sayedaty Sadaty
- 2024 - Dea King
- 2023 – Interpretation
- 2022 – High Emocean
- 2021 – Wentwood
- 2020 – Princess Jenni
- 2019 – Top of the Range
- 2018 – Red Alto
- 2017 – Qewy
- 2016 – Francis Of Assisi
- 2015 – The Offer
- 2014 – Bring Something
- 2013 – Sertorius
- 2012 – Puissance De Lune
- 2011 – Tanby
- 2010 – Dream Pedlar
- 2009 – Zupacool
- 2008 – Banana Man
- 2007 – Captious
- 2006 – Gallic
- 2005 – True Courser
- 2004 – Gallic
- 2003 – Western Waters
- 2002 – Forlorna
- 2001 – Saboteur
- 2000 – Yammer
- 1999 – Majestic Avenue
- 1998 – race not held
- 1997 – Napier Street
- 1996 – Cockade
- 1995 – Double Take
- 1994 – Ice Doctor
- 1993 – Frontier Boy
- 1992 – Rasputins Revenge
- 1991 – Stick Around
- 1990 – Jolly Good Thought
- 1989 – Chigarow
- 1988 – Betoota
- 1987 – Flying Eskimo
- 1986 – Impertinent Charge
- 1985 – Gold Deck
- 1984 – Toyed
- 1983 – Al Dwain
- 1982 – Spring Moss
- 1981 – Magistrate
- 1980 – Summer Fleur
- 1979 – Rothschild
- 1978 – Puramaka
- 1977 – Massuk
- 1976 – Bouverie
- 1975 – Shiftmar
- 1974 – Tudor Peak
- 1973 – Sendock
- 1972 – Haarle
- 1971 – Raad
- 1970 – Honda
- 1969 – Whats Brewing
- 1968 – Bobalex
- 1967 – Peace Mission
- 1966 – Celero
- 1965 – Snowstream Lass
- 1964 – Spotted
- 1963 – Algalon
- 1962 – Oswald
- 1961 – Torrid
- 1960 – Savage
- 1959 – Royal Symbol
- 1958 – Declaree
- 1957 – Baroda Beam
- 1956 – Harry Lime
- 1955 – Sunish
- 1954 – Just Caroline
- 1953 – Most Regal
- 1952 – Most Regal
- 1951 – Matterhorn
- 1950 – Prince O'Fairies
- 1949 – Flemish
- 1948 – Doctrine
- 1947 – Manakau
- 1946 – Skyway
- 1940–1945 – not held due to WWII
- 1939 – Bell Buoy
- 1938 – Maluno
- 1937 – Evening Mist
- 1936 – Counter Patrol
- 1935 – Gay Star
- 1934 – Nellie's Tip
- 1933 – Metallurgy
- 1932 – Roc
- 1931 – Lampra
- 1930 – Temptation
- 1929 – Master Lunette
- 1928 – Madam
- 1927 – Epilogue
- 1926 – Longworthy
- 1925 – Valwyne
- 1924 – King Pan
- 1923 – Creeper
- 1922 – Yacamunda
- 1921 – Gringalet
- 1920 – Romani
- 1919 – Bullengarook
- 1918 – Hoprig

== See also ==
- List of Australian Group races
- Group races
