= Triscay Stakes =

- Class: Group 3
- Location: Randwick Racecourse
- Inaugurated: 1995
- Race type: Thoroughbred
- Sponsor: Robrick Lodge (2014-2026)

Race information
- Distance: 1,200 metres
- Surface: Turf
- Track: Right-handed
- Qualification: Mares four years old and older
- Weight: Quality handicap
- Purse: $250,000 (2026)

The Triscay Stakes is an Australian Turf Club Group 3 Thoroughbred horse race, for mares aged four-years-old and upwards, with set weights with penalties conditions, over a distance of 1200 metres at Randwick Racecourse in Sydney, Australia in mid February.

== History ==
The race is named after champion two-year-old and three-year-old filly Triscay who won both the QTC Queensland Guineas and Oaks in 1991.

=== Name ===
- 1995 - Triscay Fillies and Mares Quality Handicap
- 1996–2005 - Triscay Fillies and Mares Quality Stakes
- 2006 onwards - Triscay Stakes

=== Grade ===
- 1996–2013 - Listed race
- 2014 onwards - Group 3

=== Venue ===
- 1995–2001 - Rosehill Gardens Racecourse
- 2002 - Canterbury Park Racecourse
- 2003–2012 - Rosehill Gardens Racecourse
- 2013 - Warwick Farm Racecourse
- 2014 onwards - Randwick Racecourse

== Winners ==
The following are past winners of the race.

- 2026 - Weeping Woman
- 2025 - Inhibitions
- 2024 - Semana
- 2023 - Po Kare Kare
- 2022 - Snapdancer
- 2021 - Tailleur
- 2020 - Sweet Deal
- 2019 - Alassio
- 2018 - Faraway Town
- 2017 - Zestful
- 2016 - Sultry Feeling
- 2015 - Thump
- 2014 - Lilliburlero
- 2013 - She's Clean
- 2012 - Dystopia
- 2011 - Kiss From A Rose
- 2010 - Patronyme
- 2009 - Madame Pedrille
- 2008 - Hot Danish
- 2007 - Doubting
- 2006 - Shannon Bank
- 2005 - Golden Weekend
- 2004 - Victory Vein
- 2003 - Oomph
- 2002 - Okanui
- 2001 - Air She Goes
- 2000 - Hot In The City
- 1999 - Greta Hall
- 1998 - Stoneyfell Road
- 1997 - Shindig
- 1996 - Dipping
- 1995 - Light Up The World

== See also ==
- List of Australian Group races
- Group races
