= Flemington Racecourse =

Horse racing venue in Flemington, Melbourne, Victoria, Australia

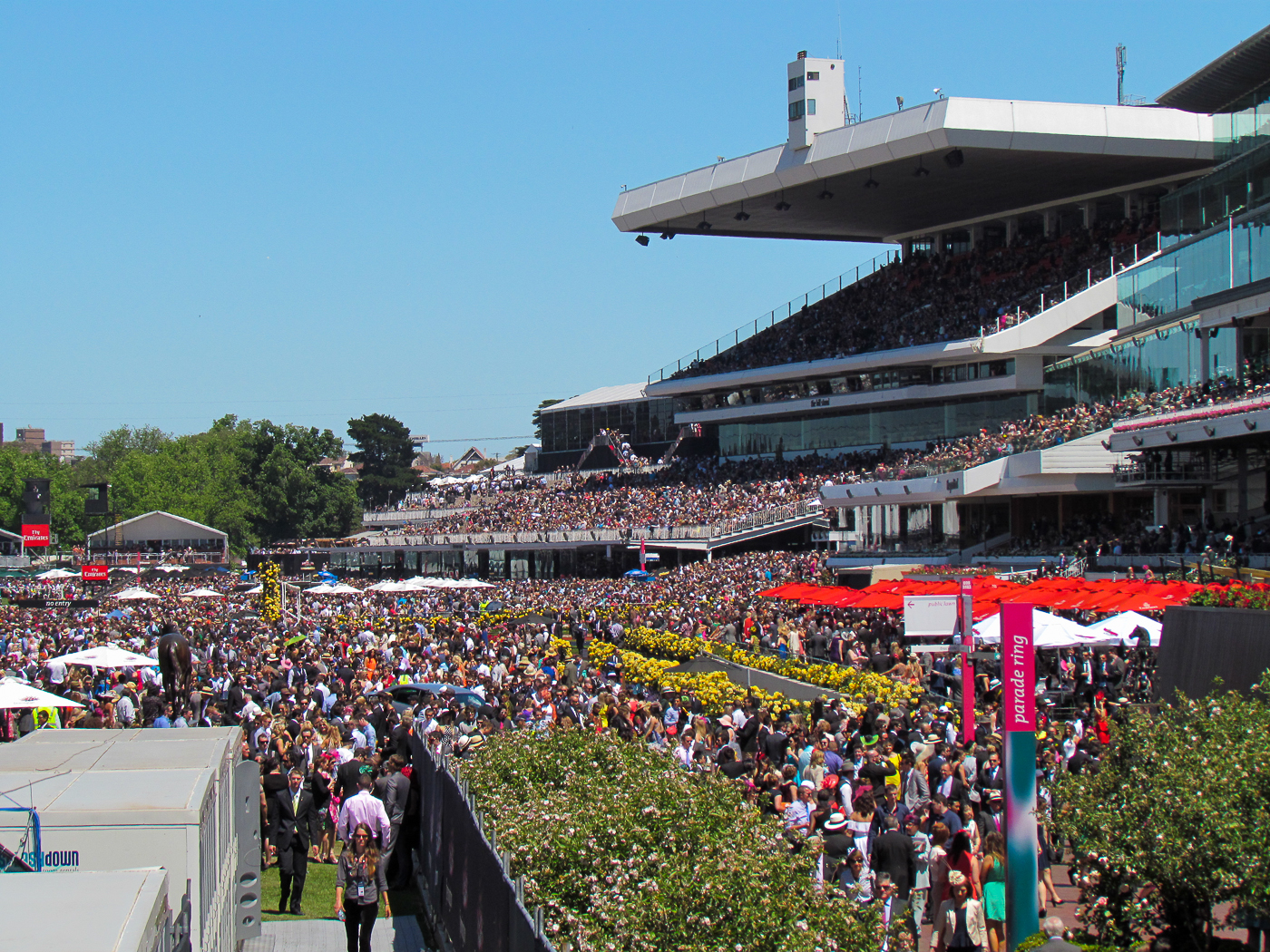
- Main grandstand during the 2013 Melbourne Cup
- Interactive map of Flemington Racecourse
- Location: Flemington, Victoria
- Coordinates: 37°47′25″S 144°54′45″E
- Owned by: Victoria Racing Club
- Date opened: 1840; 186 years ago
- Capacity: 120,000
- Screened on: Seven Network; Nine Network
- Course type: Flat; Jumps; Steeplechase
- Notable races: Melbourne Cup; Victoria Derby; LKS Mackinnon Stakes; Emirates Stakes; Newmarket Handicap; Australian Cup

Flemington Racecourse is a major horse racing venue located in Melbourne, Victoria, Australia. It is most notable for hosting the Melbourne Cup, which is the world's richest handicap and the world's richest 3200-metre horse race. The racecourse is situated on low alluvial flats, next to the Maribyrnong River. The area was first used for horse racing in March 1840.

== Overview ==
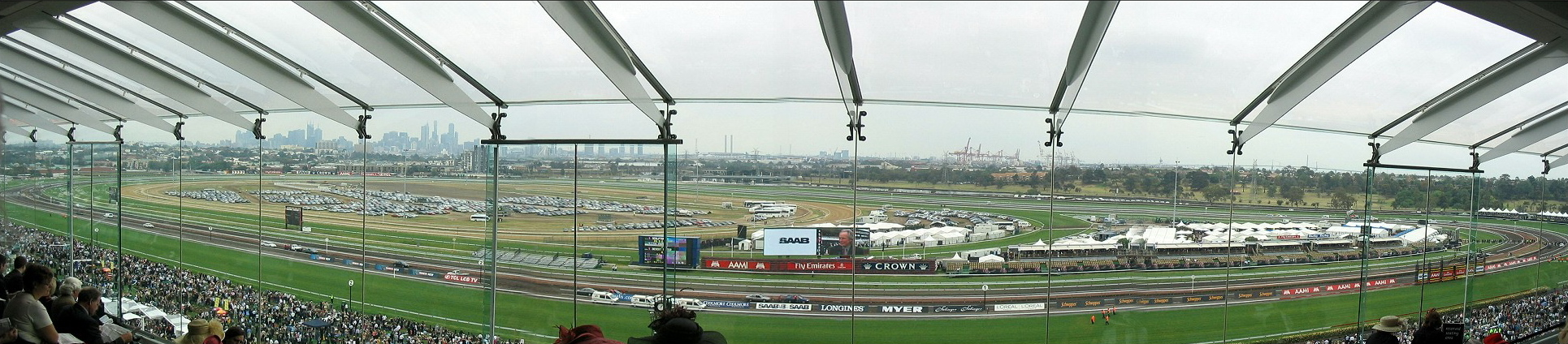
180-degree panorama of the racecourse

The Flemington Racecourse site comprises 1.27 square kilometres of Crown land. The course was originally leased to the Victoria Turf Club in 1848, which merged with the Victoria Jockey Club in 1864 to form the Victoria Racing Club. The first Melbourne Cup was run in 1861. The Victoria Racing Club Act 1871 gave the VRC legal control over Flemington Racecourse.

The racecourse is pear-shaped, and boasts a six-furlong (1,200 m) straight known as 'the Straight Six.' The track has a circumference of 2,312 metres (1.437 mi) and a final straight of 450 metres (490 yd) for race distances over 1.2 kilometres (1,300 yd). Races are run in an anti-clockwise direction.

The course has a crowd capacity of over 120,000 and contains three grandstands. The biggest ever attendance was on Victoria Derby Day in 2006 when 129,069 people saw Efficient win the Victoria Derby. On 28 November 1986, Pope John Paul II celebrated the Mass on the racetrack inner oval. The racecourse has undergone a facelift in recent years, with the opening of a new $45 million grandstand in 2000 and the opening of a new members' grandstand in 2018. It also contains a bronze statue of the famous racehorse Phar Lap, which was donated to the club as part of Australia's bicentenary celebrations in 1988. Also in celebration was the commission of Harold Freedman's seven panel mural which traces the History of Racing. The mural is housed is in The Hill Stand, built in 1977.

Flemington Racecourse was added to the Australian National Heritage List on 7 November 2006, announced during the 2006 Melbourne Cup. The site is listed on the Victorian Heritage Register.

Flemington Racecourse today hosts many of Australia's top races, including the Melbourne Cup, Victoria Derby, VRC Oaks, Mackinnon Stakes, Newmarket Handicap, Australian Cup and Lightning Stakes.

== Transport ==
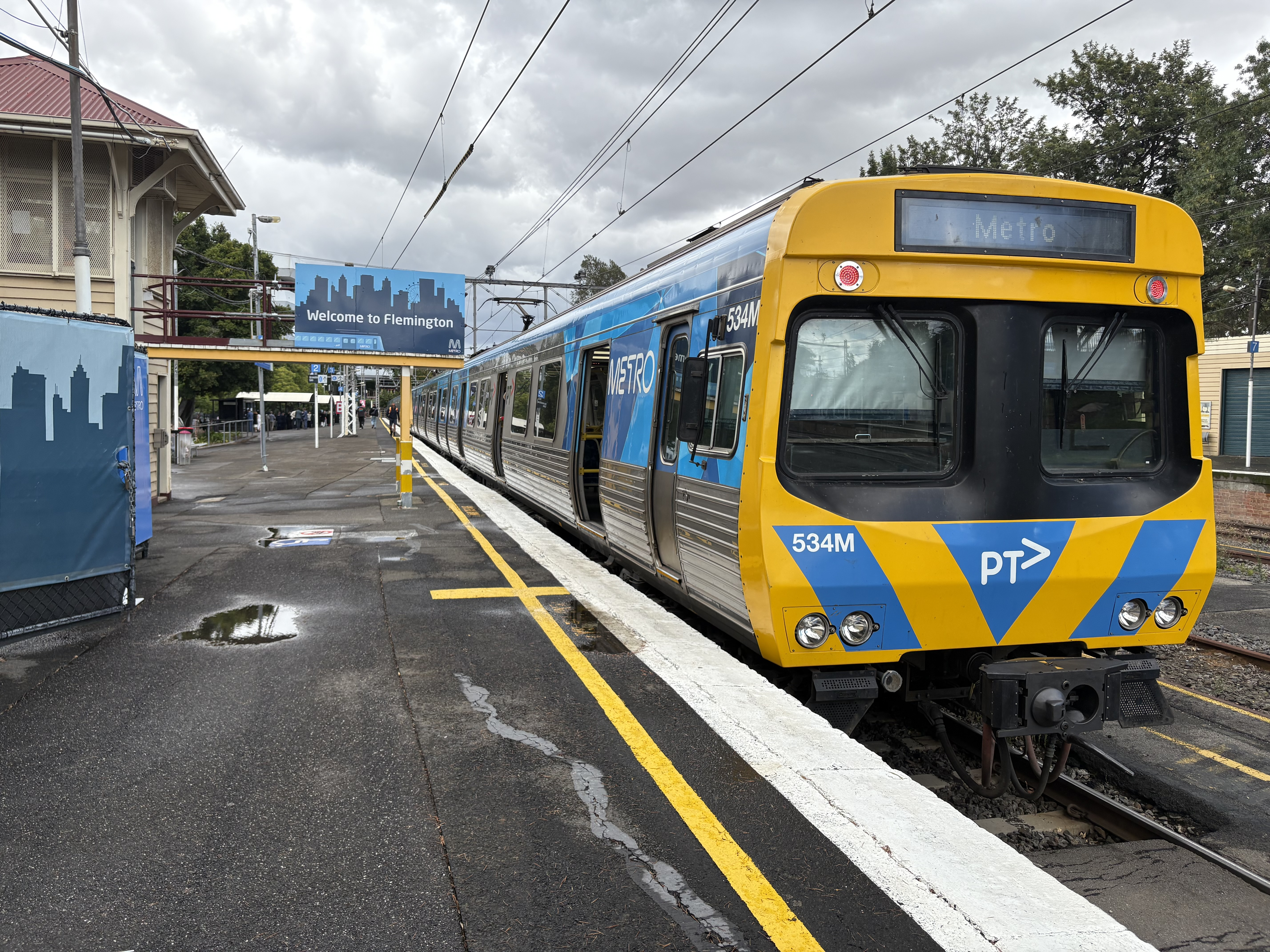
Flemington Racecourse station in 2025

The site has its own railway branch line, which operates on race days, bringing visitors to the adjacent railway station. Trains depart from platforms 8 and 9 at Flinders Street Station. The No. 57 tram from the City (Elizabeth and Flinders Streets) stops at the Epsom Road entrance.

Originally, it was serviced by Salt Water River station, before that was demolished in the 1860s and replaced with a station on the present site.

Car spaces for the disabled are available and taxi ranks are located adjacent to the main entrances. Shuttle buses run from Epsom Road to the main turnstiles of the racecourse. Lift access is available in the Prince of Wales Stand and to the first floor of the Members Stand.

== Races ==
The following is a list of Group races which are run at Flemington Racecourse. All races in metres.

Grp	Race name	Age	Sex	Weight	Distance	Date
1	Ascot Vale Stakes	3YO	Open	sw	1200	November
1	Australian Cup	Open	Open	wfa	2000	March
1	Australian Guineas	3YO	Open	sw	1600	February
1	Black Caviar Lightning	Open	Open	wfa	1000	February
1	Makybe Diva Stakes	Open	Open	wfa	1600	September
1	Cantala Stakes	Open	Open	hcp	1600	November
1	Empire Rose Stakes	3YO+	F&M	wfa	1600	November
1	LKS Mackinnon Stakes	Open	Open	wfa	2000	November
1	Melbourne Cup	Open	Open	hcp	3200	November
1	Newmarket Handicap	Open	Open	hcp	1200	March
1	VRC Sprint Classic	Open	Open	wfa	1200	November
1	Turnbull Stakes	4YO+	Open	sw+p	2000	October
1	Victoria Derby	3YO	Open	sw	2500	November
1	VRC Oaks	3YO	Fillies	sw	2500	November
2	A.V Kewney Stakes	3YO	Fillies	sw	1600	March
2	Blamey Stakes	3YO+	Open	sw+p	1600	March
2	Edward Manifold Stakes	3YO	Fillies	sw	1600	October
2	Gilgai Stakes	Open	Open	sw+p	1200	October
2	Linlithgow Stakes	Open	Open	hcp	1200	November
2	Matriarch Stakes	4YO+	Mares	hcp	2000	November
2	Rose Of Kingston Stakes	4YO+	Mares	sw+p	1400	October
2	VRC Sires' Produce Stakes	2YO	Open	sw	1400	March
2	Wakeful Stakes	3YO	Fillies	sw+p	2000	November
3	Aurie's Star Handicap	Open	Open	hcp	1200	August
3	Thoroughbred Breeders Stakes	2YO	Fillies	sw+p	1200	March
3	Bobby Lewis Quality	Open	Open	qlty	1200	September
3	Chatham Stakes	Open	Open	hcp	1400	November
3	Frances Tressady Stakes	4YO+	Mares	sw+p	1400	March
3	Hotham Handicap	Open	Open	qlty	2500	November
3	Maribyrnong Plate	2YO	Open	sw+p	1000	November
3	Matron Stakes	4YO+	Mares	sw+p	1600	March
3	Let's Elope Stakes	4YO+	Mares	sw+p	1400	September
3	Standish Handicap	Open	Open	hcp	1200	January
3	C S Hayes Stakes	3YO	C&G	sw+p	1400	February
3	The Vanity	3YO	Fillies	sw+p	1400	February
3	VRC Carbine Club Stakes	3YO	Open	sw+p	1600	November
3	VRC Queen Elizabeth Stakes	Open	Open	qlty	2600	November
L	VRC St Leger Stakes	3YO	Open	sw+p	2800	April

=== Key ===
- hcp - handicap
- qlty - quality handicap
- sw - set weights
- sw+p - set weights with penalties
- wfa - Weight for Age

== Flemington Racecourse (Car Park) ==
To the north of the racecourse and south of the rail line and station, lies a car park. On non race days, it is sometimes used for other events, mainly music festivals and concerts, but has also been used for other events including car shows and local markets.

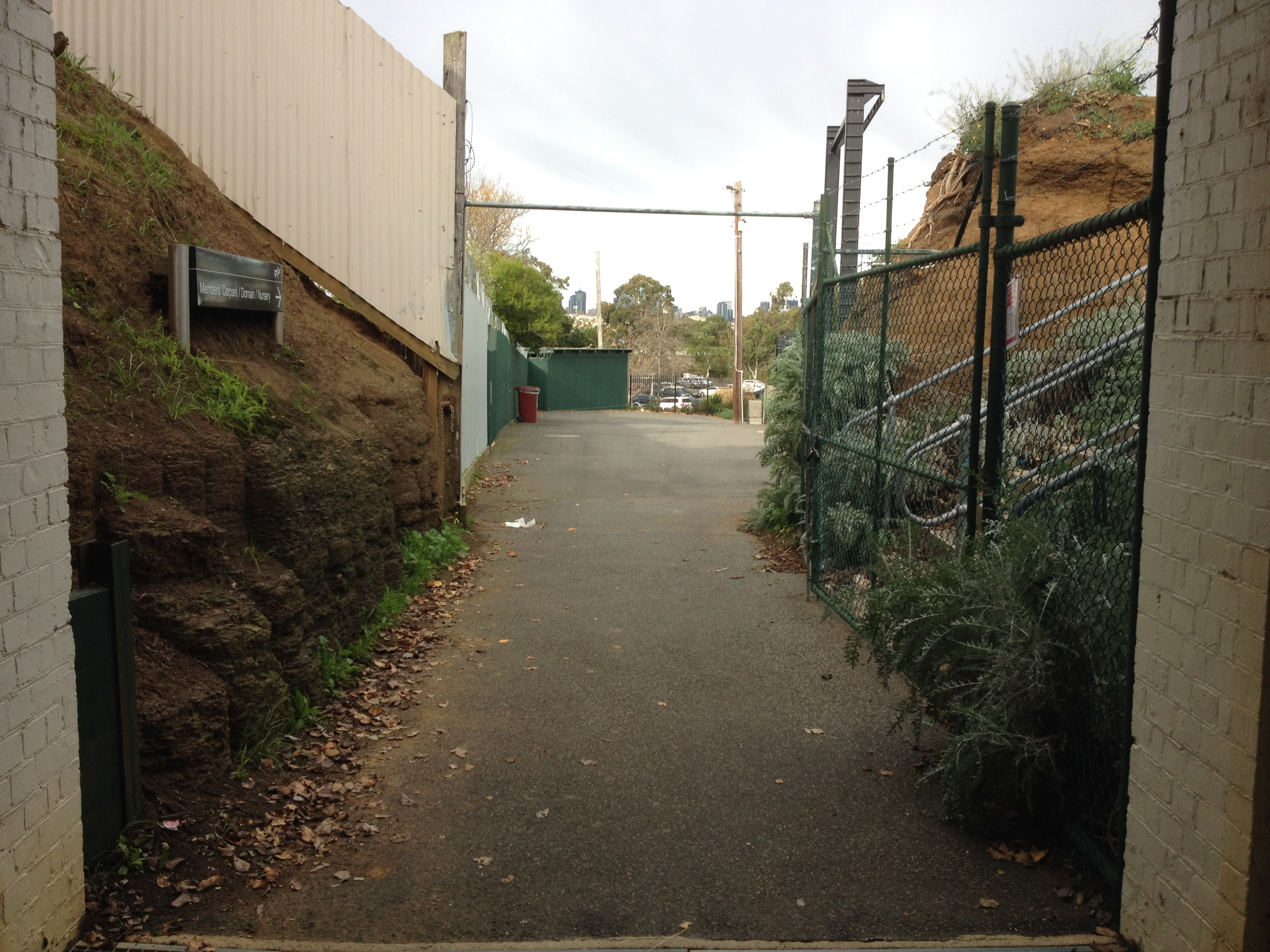
Underpass at Flemington Racecourse station which connects the station to both the Racecourse and the Showgrounds with a sign pointing towards the carpark with the different names/zones (Members Carpark / Domain / Nursery)

The location typically goes by Flemington Racecourse, but some festivals use different names; Laneway Festival refers to it as "Flemington Park", and Tell No Tales festival refers to it as "The Nursery".

=== History ===
Small local events have been hosted at the site for many years, as early as 1996 with a local market that offered fresh foods, jewellery, distinctive clothing, Australian-made art and craft.

In the mid 2000s, around 2005-2007 the racecourse was redeveloped. The VRC wanted to increase and diversify their revenue, and to maximize the use of their facilities beyond race days. This redevelopment however, did not rebuild the car park itself.

In March 2008 the Royal Automobile Club of Victoria hosted the RACV Classic showcase. On 20 July 2008, the car park hosted the 4th Shannons car show.

On 17 May 2009, the RACV Classic Showcase was once again held at the venue,also on the, 29 April 2012, 21 April 2013, 30 March 2014,10 April 2016, and 19 February 2017.

Shannon's also hosted other car shows in 2014and on 19 April 2015 and on 1 May 2016.

Circuses have run at the car park a few times, including in 2015 with TOTEM 2024 with LUZIA and in 2026 with KOOZA.

During the COVID-19 pandemic in Victoria it was proposed to have drive-in concerts at the venue with 12 concerts, plus a movie and comedy night. However, due to the second lockdown in Melbourne, the events were canceled.

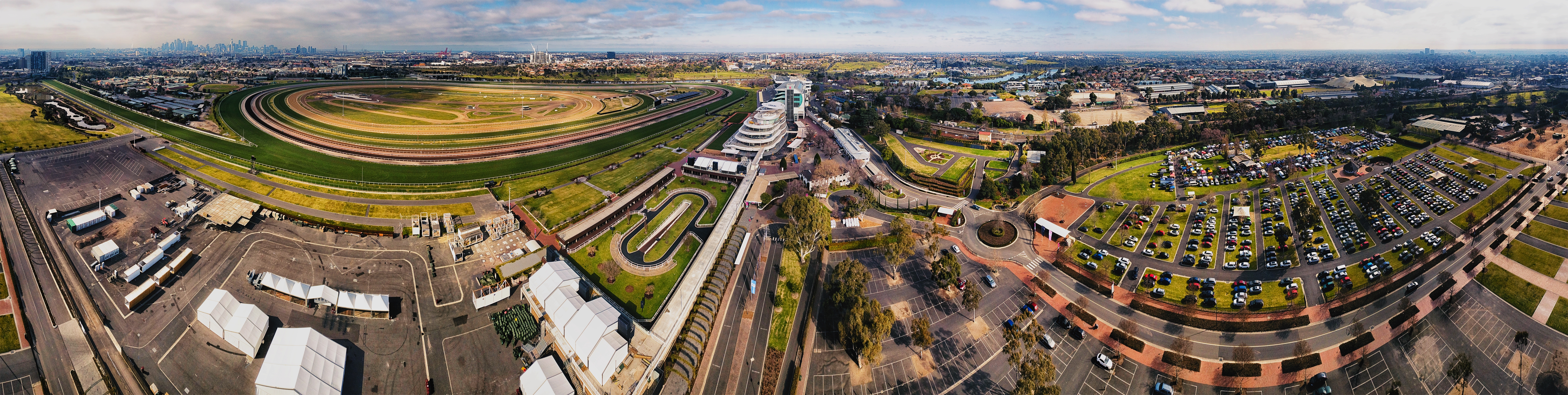
Aerial panorama of Flemington Racecourse. Taken August 2018.The carpark can be seen on the right of the photo, both the asphalt area (Members Reserve parking) and the grass area (Public parking),

List of Events
Date	Festival / Headline Artist	Festival Headliner / Support	Crowd	Ref
16 January 1999	Warped Tour 1999	Suicidal Tendencies, Pennywise, Grinspoon MxPx		
6 April 2002	Warped Tour 2002	Guttermouth, 28 Days		
28 January 2008	Big Day Out	Rage Against the Machine, Björk, Arcade Fire		Big Day Out lineups
26 January 2009	Big Day Out	Neil Young, The Prodigy, Arctic Monkeys		Big Day Out lineups
15 February 2009	Good Vibrations	Fatboy Slim, Q-Tip and The Presets.	25,000	
8 March 2009	Future Music Festival	James Taylor, N.E.R.D.,Basement Jaxx		
26 January 2010	Big Day Out	Muse, Powderfinger		Big Day Out lineups
21 February 2010	Good Vibrations	The Killers, Salt-N-Pepa, Kid Cudi, Art vs. Science	15,000	
7 March 2010	Future Music Festival	The Prodigy, Franz Ferdinand, Empire of the Sun David Guetta		
30 January 2011	Big Day Out	Tool, Rammstein, The Stooges, M.I.A.	52,000	Big Day Out lineups
13 February 2011	Good Vibrations	Faithless, Mike Posner, Ludacuris		
13 March 2011	Future Music Festival	The Chemical Brothers, Art vs. Science, Binary Finary, Cosmic Gate		
29 January 2012	Big Day Out	Kanye West, Soundgarden	42,000	Big Day Out lineups
4 March 2012	Future Music Festival	Swedish House Mafia, New Order, Fatboy Slim, Paul van Dyk		
9 March 2012	Good Life	Steve Angello, Skrillex, Tinie Tempah	20,000+	
26 January 2013	Big Day Out	Red Hot Chili Peppers, The Killers	50,000	Big Day Out lineups
1 March 2013	Soundwave	Metallica, Linkin Park and Blink-182,		
8 March 2013	Good Life	Avicii, Psy, Hardwell, Zeds Dead, Timmy Trumpet		
10 March 2013	Future Music Festival	Avicii, The Prodigy, The Stone Roses, Psy, Bloc Party		
24 January 2014	Big Day Out	Pearl Jam, Arcade Fire, Blur	26,000	
28 February 2014	Soundwave	Green Day and Avenged Sevenfold		
7 March 2014	Good Life	Deadmau5, Macklemore & Ryan Lewis, Rudimental, Martin Garrix		
9 March 2014	Future Music Festival	Deadmau5, Macklemore & Ryan Lewis, Phoenix Hardwell, Eric Prydz		
8 March 2015	Future Music Festival	Drake, Avicii, The Prodigy, Afrojack, Martin Garrix, Example		
9 March 2015	Good LIfe	Avicii, Afrojack, Martin Garrix, Will Sparks B2B Timmy Trumpet B2B Joel Fletcher Havana Brown (musician)		
3 December 2016	Tell No Tales			
26 November 2017	Creamfields Australia	Deadmau5, Dimitri Vegas & Like Mike, Don Diablo, Fedde Le Grand		
7 December 2018	Good Things	The Offspring, Stone Sour		
13 January 2019	FOMO	Nicki Minaj, Rae Sremmurd, Lil Pump, Mura Masa		
23 February 2019	Ultra Australia	Adam Beyer, The Chainsmokers, Dubfire, Illenium, Marshmello, Martin Garrix		
6 December 2019	Good Things	Parkway Drive, A Day to Remember		
7 December 2019	Kockout Outdoors	Angerfist, Darren Styles		
19 September 2021	Reminisce Carnivale	John Course, The Presets, Northeast Party House		
8 March 2020	Ultra Australia	Afrojack, DJ Snake, Eric Prydz, Zedd		
13 March 2022	Karnival	Angerfist, Ben Nicky, Darren Styles		
2 April 2022	Subculture	Aly & Filab b2b John O'Callaghan , Bryan Kearney Giuseppe Ottaviani		
17 September 2022	Transmission	Ferry Corsten Markus Schulz Vini Vici		
26 November 2022	Festival X	Calvin Harris, Don Toliver		
2 December 2022	Good Things	Bring Me the Horizon, Deftones		
15 & 16 December 2022	Rüfüs Du Sol			
11 February 2023	Laneway Festival	Haim, Joji, Phoebe Bridgers		
12 March 2023	Karnival	Atmozfears, Brennan Heart, Hixxy, Miss K8		
23 April 2023	Carl Cox PURE			
22 March 2023	Dreamsate	Ben Nicky, Cosmic Gate, Maddix		
24 March 2023	Knotfest	Slipknot, Parkway Drive, Megadeth		
25 November 2023	Christina Aguilera			
26 November 2023	Dreamstate	Above & Beyond, Vini Vici, Billy Gillies		
1 December 2023	Good Things	Fall Out Boy, Limp Bizkit Devo		
9 December 2023	Zach Bryan			
10 February 2024	Laneway Festival	Stormzy, Steve Lacy, Dominic Fike		
10 March 2024	Transmission	Andrew Rayel Cosmic Gate Markus Schulz Paul van Dyk		
21 March 2024	Knotfest	Pantera, Disturbed		
13 April 2024	Ultra Australia	Zedd, and Carl Cox		
14 September 2024	Marlo, Elements of Unity			
25 & 26 October 2024	Cold Chisel	The Cruel Sea, Karen Lee Andrews		
23 November 2024	Anyma's GENESYS			
6 December 2024	Good Things	Korn, Violent Femmes, Electric Callboy		
13 & 14 December 2024	Dom Dolla	Flight Facilities		
9 February 2025	Dreamstate	Above & Beyond, Billy Gillies, Ben Nicky		
14 February 2025	Laneway Festival	Charli XCX, Clairo, Beabadoobee		
28 February 2025	Knotfest	Slipknot, A Day to Remember		
12 April 2025	Ultra Australia	Martin Garrix and Axwell		
6 September 2025	Marlo Altitude: Without Limits			
30 November 2025	Hypersonic	Armin van Buuren, Alesso and Steve Aoki		
5 December 2025	Good Things	Tool, Weezer		
8 February 2026	Dreamstate	Ben Hemsley, Ben Nicky, Vini Vici		
13 February 2026	Laneway Festival	Chappell Roan, Alex G, Benee, Cavetown		
14 March 2026	안녕, Hello Music Festival	Enhypen, Treasure, Taemin		
2 April 2026	Keinemusik			
11 April 2026	Ultra Australia	The Chainsmokers, DJ Snake and Zedd	46,000	
5 September 2026	Marlo: The Decade			
28 November 2026	CORE			
7 February 2027	Dreamstate	Tiësto (Trance Set)		
19 February 2027	Laneway Festival	Fontaines D.C., Hayley Williams, Slayyyter, Adéla		
25,26,28 February 2027	Calvin Harris			

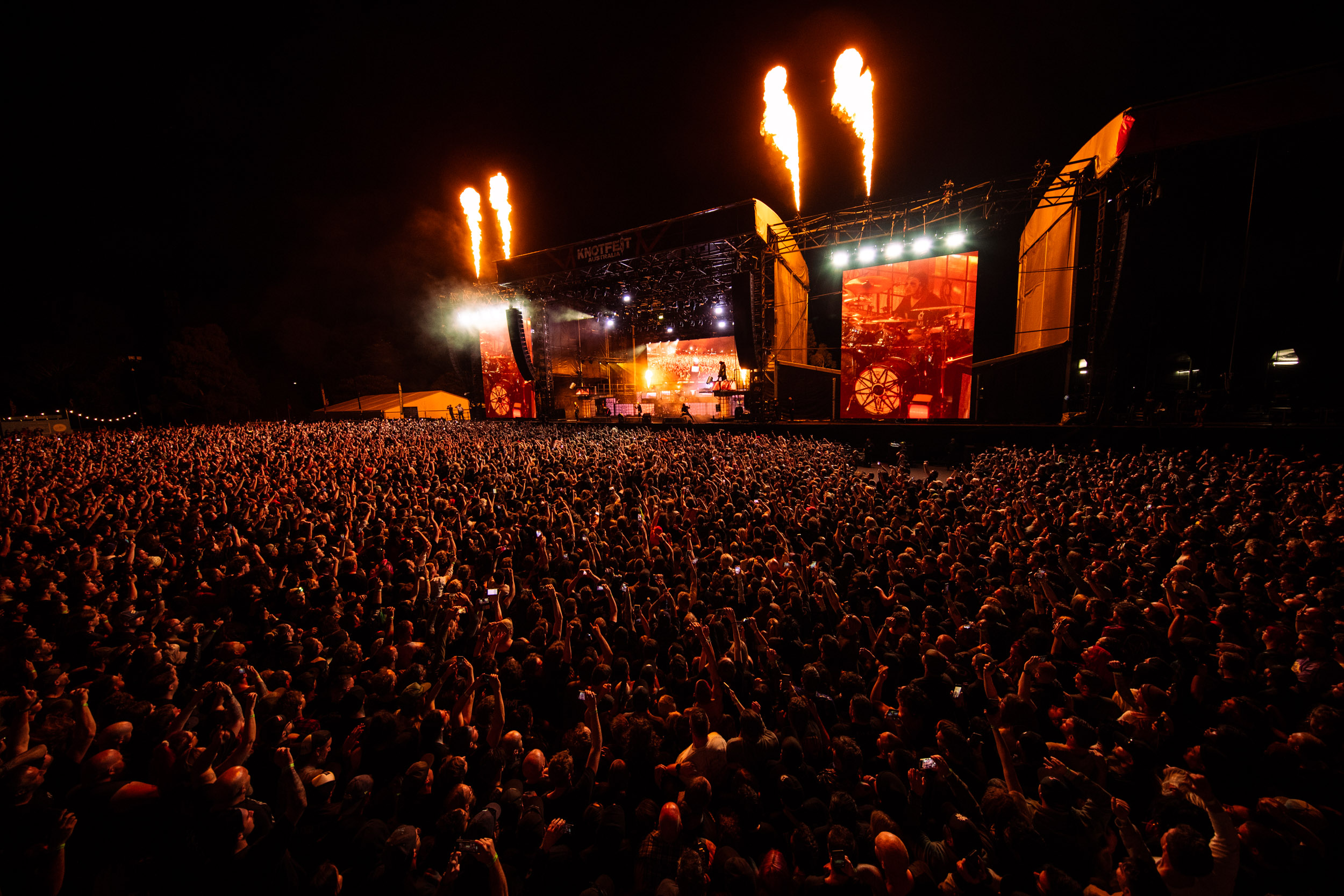
Knotfest in 2023

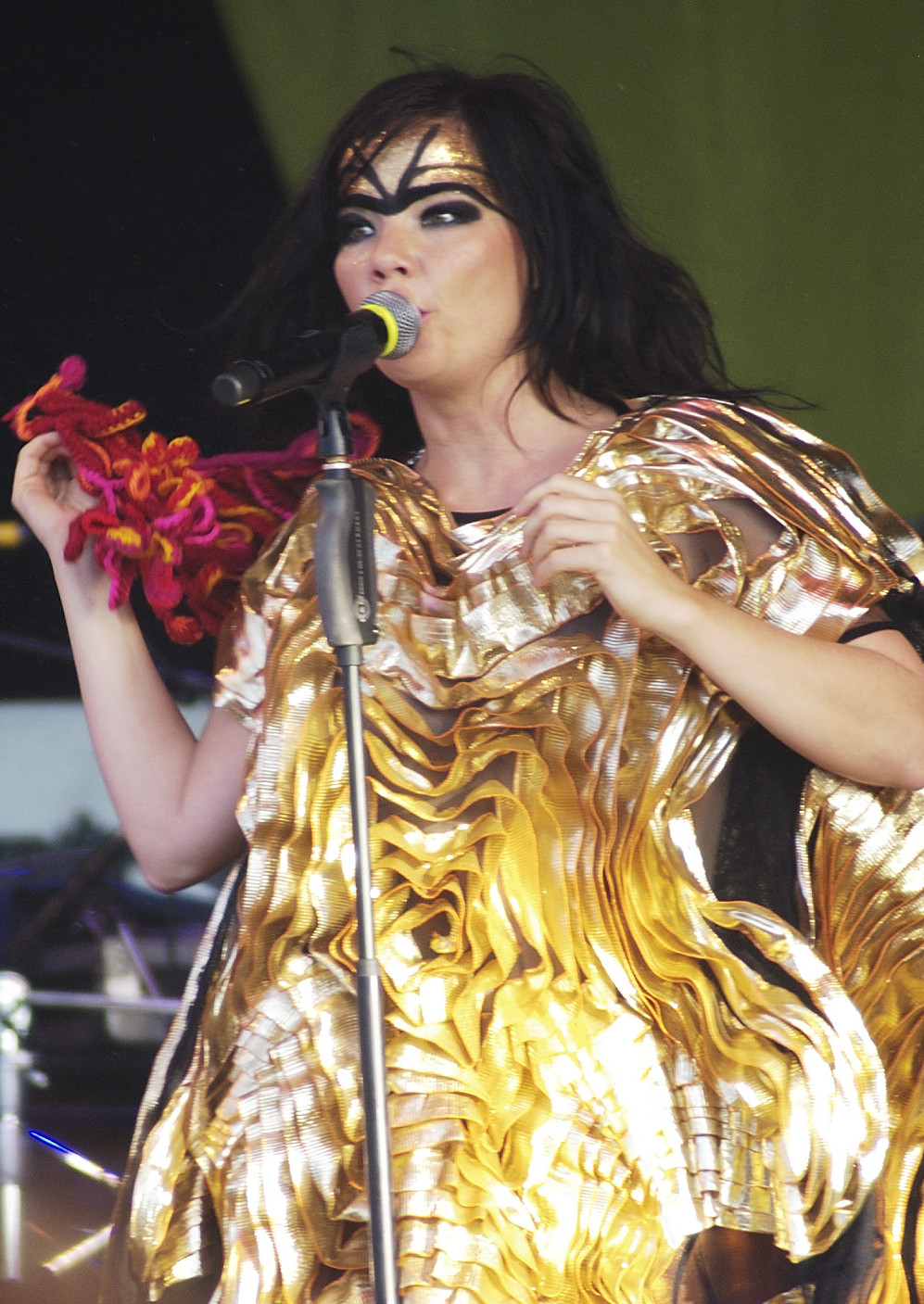
Björk at Big Day Out 2008

== Gallery ==
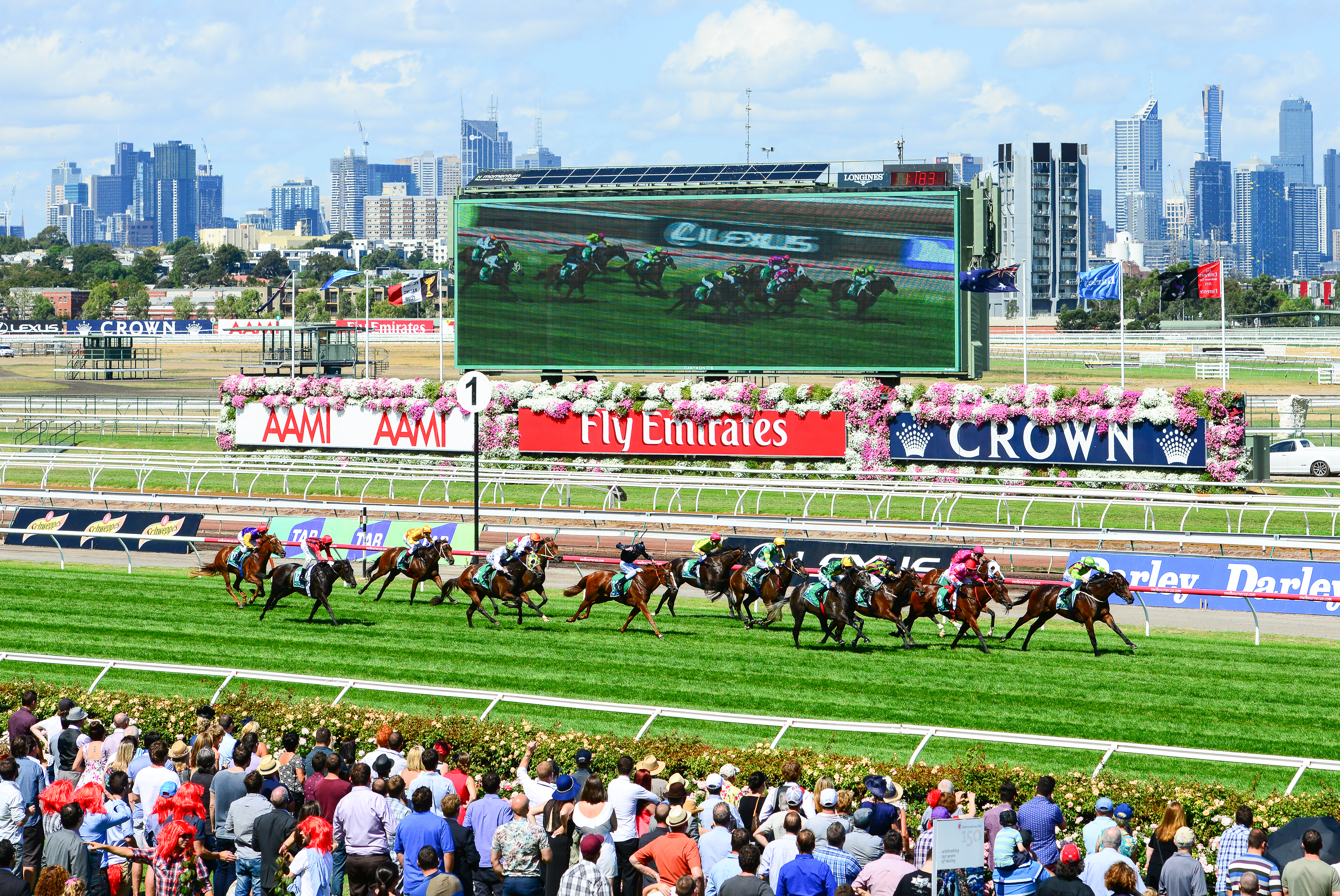
Super Saturday at Flemington racecourse

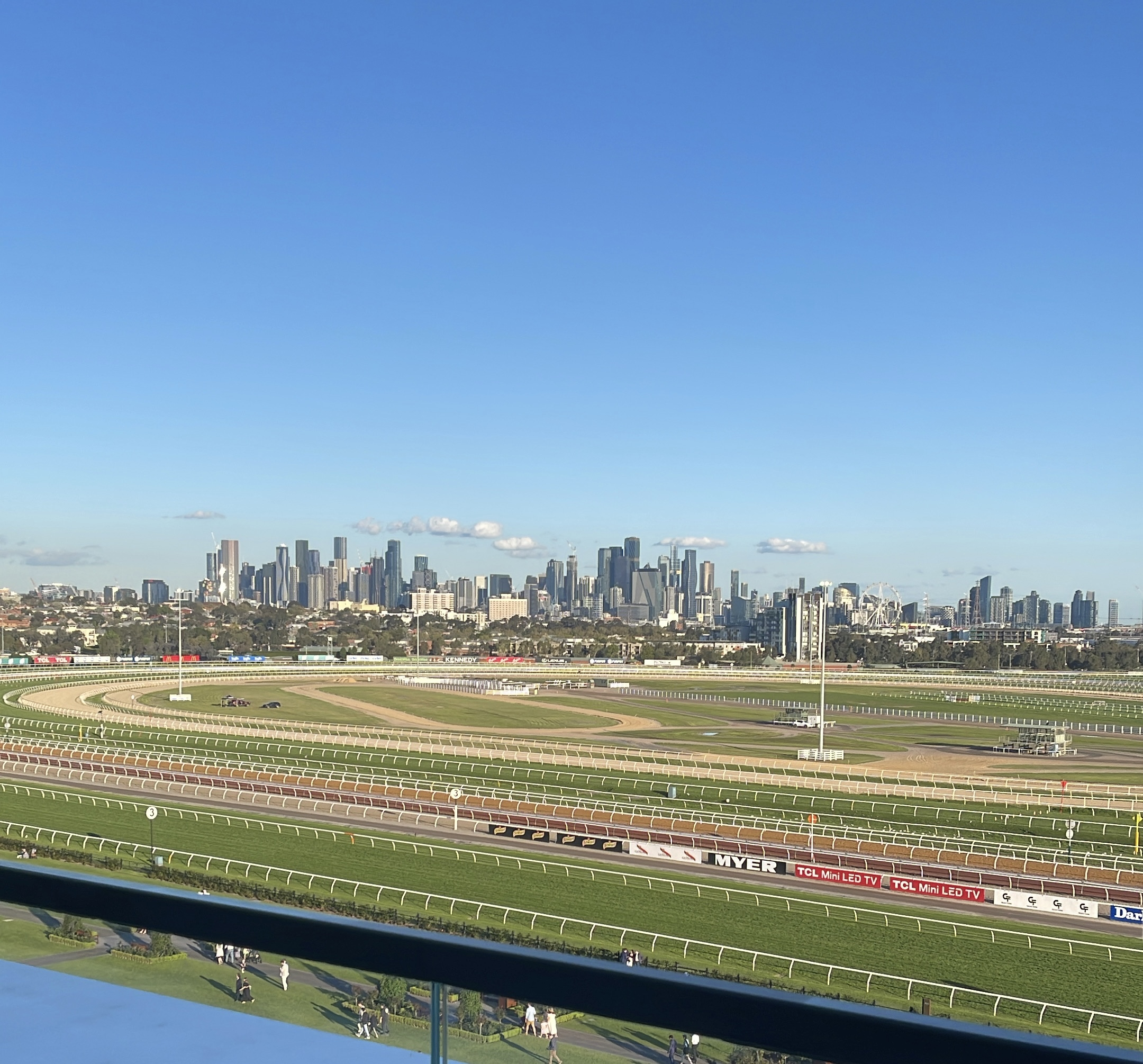
Image of Melbourne skyline from Flemington Racecourse

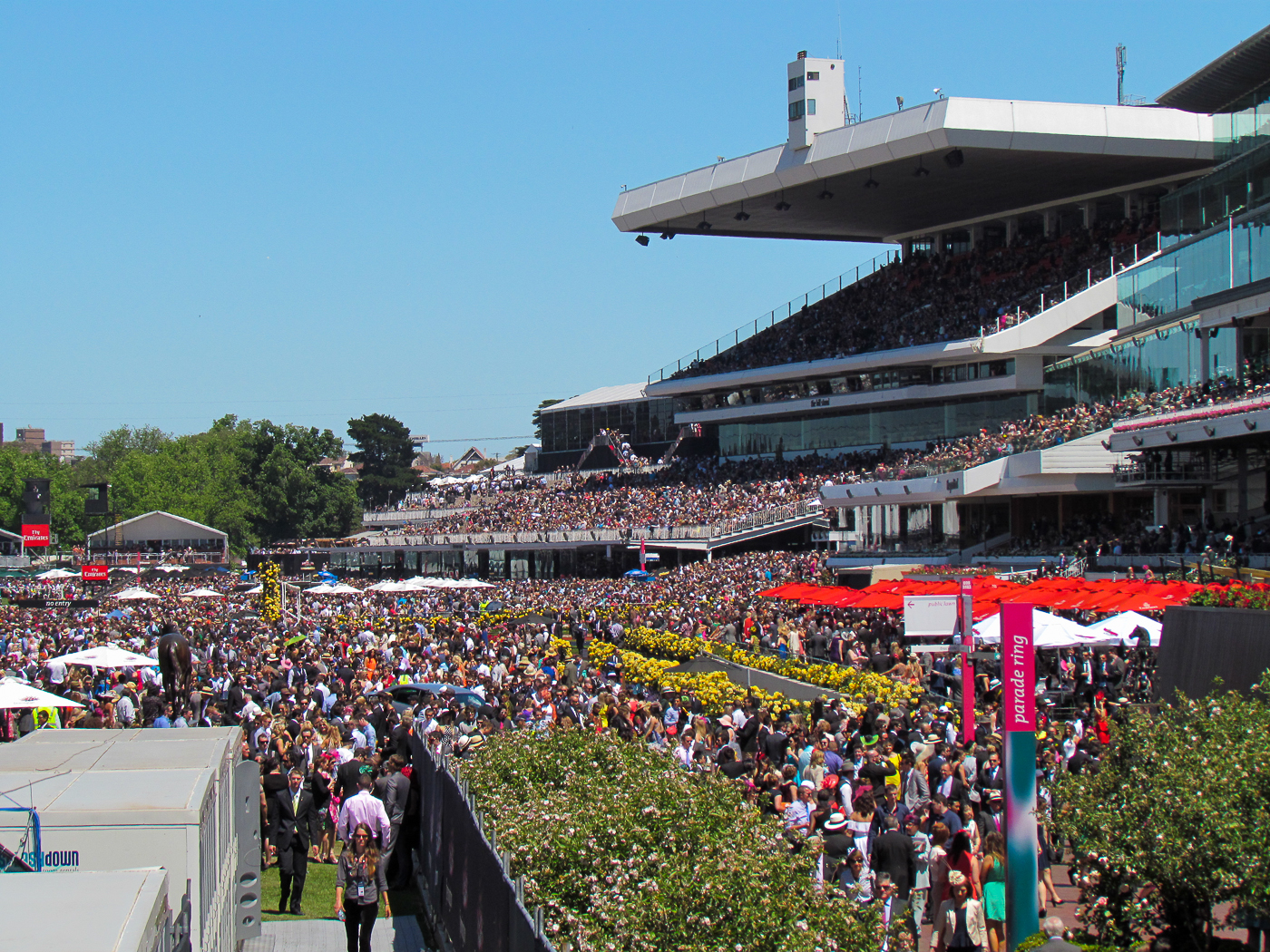
A view of the stands at w:Flemington Racecourse during the 2013 Melbourne Cup.

== See also ==
- Australian horse-racing
- Melbourne Spring Racing Carnival
