= G A Towton Cup =

- Class: Listed Race
- Location: Ascot Racecourse
- Inaugurated: 1983
- Race type: Thoroughbred

Race information
- Distance: 2,200 metres
- Surface: Turf
- Track: Left-handed
- Qualification: Three year old and older
- Weight: Quality handicap
- Purse: A$125,000 (2025)

The G A Towton Cup is a Perth Racing Listed race Thoroughbred horse race held under quality handicap conditions, for horses aged three years old and upwards, over a distance of 2200 metres at Ascot Racecourse, Perth, Western Australia in December.

== History ==
The race is a major preparatory race for the Perth Cup which is held on New Year's Day.

In 2003 the race was run at Belmont Park Racecourse.

=== Name ===
In 2004 the race was run under the name JRA (Japan Racing Association) Trophy. In 2014 the race was run under the name of the Queens Cup.

=== Grade ===
- 1983–2013 - Listed race
- 2014 - Group 3
- 2015 - Listed race

=== Distance ===
- 1983–1984 – 2200 metres
- 1984–2001 – 2400 metres
- 2002–2003 – 2200 metres
- 2004–2013 – 2400 metres
- 2014 onwards - 2200 metres

== Winners ==
- 2025 - Buckets Ridge
- 2024 - Playhouse Patron
- 2023 - Black Fantasy
- 2022 - Buster Bash
- 2021 - Black Shadow
- 2020 - Trap For Fools
- 2019 - Taxagano
- 2018 - Cappo D'Oro
- 2017 - Trap For Fools
- 2016 - Kia Ora Koutou
- 2015 - Dust Me Off
- 2014 - Real Love
- 2013 - Knightlike
- 2012 - Global Flirt
- 2011 - race not held
- 2010 - Brandy Lane
- 2009 - race not held
- 2008 - Exhilarating
- 2007 - Luskin Dancer
- 2006 - Ramiro
- 2005 - Miss Copycat
- 2004 - Reigning Fort
- 2003 - Celtus
- 2002 - So Canny
- 2001 - Cardinal Colours
- 2000 - Noble Cavalier
- 1999 - Kim Angel
- 1998 - Master Touch
- 1997 - Big Cloud
- 1996 - Maestro's Mischief
- 1995 - True Russian
- 1994 - Big Al
- 1993 - Sir Vole
- 1992 - Red Javelin
- 1991 - Red Javelin
- 1990 - All Spark
- 1989 - William's Ghost
- 1988 - Betoota
- 1987 - Linc The Leopard
- 1986 - Nippie's Dream
- 1985 - Ullyatt
- 1984 - Swift Knight
- 1983 - Rosamoss

== See also ==
- Northerly Stakes (Kingston Town Classic)
- Perth Cup
- List of Australian Group races
- Group races
