= Snapdancer =

Australian thoroughbred racehorse

- Sire: Choisir
- Grandsire: Danehill Dancer
- Dam: Snapdragon
- Damsire: Galileo
- Sex: Mare
- Foaled: 16 August 2016
- Country: Australia
- Colour: Bay
- Breeder: Katom
- Owner: BJ Spicer et al.
- Trainer: Ciaron Maher and David Eustace
- Record: 20: 7-5-2
- Earnings: A$2,027,620

Major wins
- Triscay Stakes (2022); Robert Sangster Stakes (2022); Memsie Stakes (2022)

Snapdancer (foaled 16 August 2016) is a multiple Group 1 winning Australian Thoroughbred racehorse.

== Background ==
Bred by Coolmore Stud, Snapdancer was sold for A$180,000 at the 2018 Magic Millions yearling sale. She was purchased by Spicer Thoroughbreds/Darren Weir Racing.

== Racing career ==
Snapdancer did not start in a race until she was a three-year-old when finishing second in a maiden at Pakenham on the 1 August 2019. She won her first race just three weeks later at the Ballarat race course.

As a five-year-old, Snapdancer was successful in the 2022 Magic Millions for Fillies and Mares, when ridden by James McDonald.

McDonald was the jockey at Snapdancer's next start when winning the Triscay Stakes at Randwick. This was Snapdancer's first stakes win, despite placing at Listed and Group level on four previous occasions.

Snapdancer won two Group 1 races in 2022 when successful in the Robert Sangster Stakes at Morphettville and the Memsie Stakes at Caulfield, on both occasions ridden by jockey Ethan Brown.

== Retirement ==
In 2023 Snapdancer was sold to Yulong Stud for $3.2 million to commence broodmare duties.

== Pedigree ==
Pedigree of Snapdancer (AUS) 2016
Sire Choisir (AUS) 1999	Danehill Dancer (IRE); 1993	Danehill	Danzig
Sire Choisir (AUS) 1999	Danehill Dancer (IRE); 1993	Danehill	Razyana
Sire Choisir (AUS) 1999	Danehill Dancer (IRE); 1993	Mira Adonde	Sharpen Up
Sire Choisir (AUS) 1999	Danehill Dancer (IRE); 1993	Mira Adonde	Lettre D'Amour
Sire Choisir (AUS) 1999	Great Selection (AUS); 1990	Lunchtime	Silly Season
Sire Choisir (AUS) 1999	Great Selection (AUS); 1990	Lunchtime	Great Occasion
Sire Choisir (AUS) 1999	Great Selection (AUS); 1990	Pensive Mood	Biscay
Sire Choisir (AUS) 1999	Great Selection (AUS); 1990	Pensive Mood	Staid
Dam Snapdragon (IRE) 2003	Galileo (IRE); 1998	Sadler's Wells	Northern Dancer
Dam Snapdragon (IRE) 2003	Galileo (IRE); 1998	Sadler's Wells	Fairy Bridge
Dam Snapdragon (IRE) 2003	Galileo (IRE); 1998	Urban Sea	Miswaki
Dam Snapdragon (IRE) 2003	Galileo (IRE); 1998	Urban Sea	Allegretta
Dam Snapdragon (IRE) 2003	Continuous (IRE); 1991	Darshaan	Shirley Heights
Dam Snapdragon (IRE) 2003	Continuous (IRE); 1991	Darshaan	Delsy
Dam Snapdragon (IRE) 2003	Continuous (IRE); 1991	Tifrums	Thatch
Dam Snapdragon (IRE) 2003	Continuous (IRE); 1991	Tifrums	Persian Apple
