= Belle of the Turf Stakes =

Belle Of The Turf Stakes
- Class: Group 3
- Location: Gosford Racetrack
- Inaugurated: 1988
- Race type: Thoroughbred
- Sponsor: Gosford RSL Club (2012-2024)

Race information
- Distance: 1,600 metres
- Surface: Turf
- Track: Right-handed
- Qualification: Fillies and mares three years old and older
- Weight: Quality handicap
- Purse: $300,000 (2024)

The Belle Of The Turf Stakes is a Gosford Racing Club Group 3 Thoroughbred quality handicap horse race for fillies and mares three-years-old and older, over a distance of 1600 meters at Gosford Racecourse, Gosford, Australia in December.

== History ==
Prior to 2012 the race was run in October. The Gosford Racing Club moved the race to January, increasing the prize money to the race as well as the Gosford Cup and Takeover Target Stakes.

For the 2017–18 season, the race was moved to December as part of the Central Coast Carnival.

=== Grade ===
- 1988–2013 - Listed race
- 2014 onwards - Group 3

== Winners ==
The following are winners of the race.

- 2025 - Kind Words
- 2024 - Konansana
- 2023 - Lekvarte
- 2022 - Deny Knowledge
- 2021 - Expat
- 2020 - Threeood
- 2019 - Tinkermosa
- 2018 - Sexy Eyes
- 2017 (December) (Note: Moved to December as part of the Central Coast Carnival) - Pecans
- 2017 (January) - Imposing Lass
- 2016 - Ammirata
- 2015 - Mamwaazel
- 2014 - Myamira
- 2013 - Cathay Lady
- 2012 - race not held (Note: Change in schedule for 2012–13 racing season)
- 2011 - Skyerush
- 2010 - Hidden Wonder
- 2009 - Messenger
- 2008 - Prima Nova
- 2007 - race not held (Note: Not held because of outbreak of equine influenza)
- 2006 - Pekalan
- 2005 - Wild Queen
- 2004 - Hec Of A Party
- 2003 - Imperatrix
- 2002 - Rosa Marada
- 2001 - Dandify
- 2000 - Avilde
- 1999 - Rubitoff
- 1998 - St Pamela Ann
- 1997 - The Essence
- 1996 - Money Thinks
- 1995 - Macrosa
- 1994 - Diversify
- 1993 - race not held
- 1992 - Pusan
- 1991 - Volcanic
- 1990 - Happy Sailing
- 1989 - Come On Up
- 1988 - St. Klaire

== See also ==
- List of Australian Group races
- Group races
