= Frances Tressady Stakes =

- Class: Group 3
- Location: Flemington Racecourse, Melbourne, Australia
- Inaugurated: 1975
- Race type: Thoroughbred

Race information
- Distance: 1,400 metres
- Surface: Turf
- Qualification: Fillies and mares three years old and older
- Weight: Set weights with penalties
- Purse: $200,000 (2025)

The Frances Tressady Stakes is a Victoria Racing Club Group 3 Thoroughbred horse race held under set weight conditions with penalties, for fillies and mares aged three years old and older, over a distance of 1400 metres, held annually at Flemington Racecourse in Melbourne, Australia in February (previously in March).

== History ==
The race has had several changes in grade, name and in distance. It is named after the brilliant filly Frances Tressady who in 1923 won the VRC Victoria Derby – VRC Victorian Oaks double as well as finishing fifth in the Melbourne Cup.

=== Name ===
- 1975–1994 - Frances Tressady Stakes
- 1995–1999 - Devon Park Stud Stakes
- 2000 - Chairman's Club Stakes
- 2001 - Drumstick Gold Plate
- 2002–2004 - Tooheys New Plate
- 2005 - Schweppes Stakes
- 2006–2009 - Schweppervescence Trophy
- 2010 - National Jockey Celebration Day - Victoria Plate
- 2011–2012 - PFD Food Services Stakes
- 2013 onwards - Frances Tressady Stakes
- 2023 (only) - Tony Bourke Memorial

=== Grade ===
- 1975–1979 - Listed race
- 1980–2009 - Group 3 race
- 2010 - Listed race
- 2011 onwards - Group 3 race

=== Distance ===
- 1975–1979 – 1400 metres
- 1980–1981 – 1600 metres
- 1982 – 1400 metres
- 1983–1985 – 1600 metres
- 1986 onwards - 1400 metres

== Winners ==
The following are past winners of the race.

- 2026 - Paradise City
- 2025 - Wrote To Arataki
- 2024 - Revolutionary Miss
- 2023 - Annavisto
- 2022 - Annavisto
- 2021 - Chaillot
- 2020 - Sylvia's Mother
- 2019 - Oregon's Day
- 2018 - Flippant
- 2017 - Turbo Miss
- 2016 - Wawail
- 2015 - Madam Gangster
- 2014 - Five All
- 2013 - Tavarnelle
- 2012 - Raspberries
- 2011 - Aloha
- 2010 - Captain Coltish
- 2009 - Typhoon Tracy
- 2008 - Coniston Gem
- 2007 - Laura's Charm
- 2006 - Breezy
- 2005 - Skewif
- 2004 - Demographic
- 2003 - Galapagos Girl
- 2002 - Shelbourne Lass
- 2001 - Ticket To Rome
- 2000 - Northern Song
- 1999 - Fuss
- 1998 - Blue Storm
- 1997 - New Smyrna
- 1996 - New Smyrna
- 1995 - Tolanda
- 1994 - Not Related
- 1993 - Tarare
- 1992 - Aushla Marie
- 1991 - O'Deputy
- 1990 - Thelma Josephine
- 1989 - Riva Gleam
- 1988 - Aussie Consul
- 1987 - Playful Princess
- 1986 - Deedle
- 1985 - Sweet Gem
- 1984 - Kalimna Queen
- 1983 - Lemon Princess
- 1982 - Winter Flower
- 1981 - Parisian Romp
- 1980 - Palace Gossip
- 1979 - Minuetto
- 1978 - Pushy
- 1977 - Brett's Honour
- 1976 - Hartshill
- 1975 - Half A Moment

== See also ==
- List of Australian Group races
- Group races
