= Ben Nicky =

British trance music disc jockey

- Origin: Bristol, England, United Kingdom
- Genre: trance
- Occupation: disc jockey
- Years active: 2007-
- Website: www.bennicky.co.uk

Ben Nicky is a British disc jockey and electronic dance music record producer. Known as a trance music DJ, Nicky's music often covers other styles and genres.

== Biography ==
Nicky is from Bristol, England, and started his DJ career in 2007. In 2011 his track with Cass Fox, "The One", was highlighted as a memorable tune by Mixmag, with his work also becoming noticed by other artists including Paul van Dyk, Tiësto, and Armin van Buuren. By 2012 he was a "rising star", including supporting BBC DJ Dave Pearce at club nights. In 2013 he started the Head F**k label, releasing "mash up" tracks. In 2016 the DJ Mag magazine, in a review of a live gig, stated Nicky was a "future king" of trance.

His style of music has been described as somewhat fluid, encompassing trance, techno, hardstyle, and bounce. Nicky is also known as a "bad boy of dance", following a quote by fellow disc jockey and producer Armin Van Buuren. Nicky has regularly played live at events and festivals, including Belsonic and Creamfields. In May 2019 he made his debut on the BBC Radio 1 Essential Mix show, performing for a two-hour session. That same year Nicky was nominated for a DJ Award in the Trance category.

In 2021 Nicky bought a house in Northern Ireland.

== Discography ==
Ben Nicky singles
Title	Artist	Year	Peak UK singles sales
"The One"	Ben Nicky & Cass Fox	2011	
"Restless Hearts"	Mark Sixma & Emma Hewitt - Ben Nicky Remix	2016	
"Ayla"	Ayla (Ben Nicky & Luke Bond remix)	2018	
"Like fire"	Ben Nicky & Mashd N Kutcher	2019	
"Giving You Up"	Ben Nicky ft Sarah De Warren	2020	
"Drown you out"	Ben Nicky ft. Rachelle Jenkens	2020	85
"Dance"	Ben Nicky & Apollo	2021	84
"Where were you"	Ben Nicky & Hayla	2021	85
"Dizzy"	Olly Alexander (Ben Nicky remix)	2024	
