= Festival Stakes (ATC) =

- Class: Group 3
- Location: Rosehill Racecourse, Sydney, Australia
- Inaugurated: 1948
- Race type: Thoroughbred
- Sponsor: Gitani Stone (2025)

Race information
- Distance: 1,500 metres
- Surface: Turf
- Track: Right-handed
- Qualification: Three years old and older
- Weight: Quality handicap
- Purse: A$250,000 (2025)
- Bonuses: Exempt from ballot in the Villiers Stakes

The Festival Stakes is an Australian Turf Club Group 3 Thoroughbred quality handicap horse race, for horses aged three years old and older, over a distance of 1500 metres, held annually at Rosehill Racecourse, Sydney, Australia in early December.

== History ==
=== Name ===
- 1948–2001 - Festival Handicap
- 2002 onwards - Festival Stakes

=== Grade ===
- 1948–1978 - Principal race
- 1979–2015 - Listed race
- 2016 - Group 3

=== Distance ===
- 1948–1972 - 7 furlongs (~1400 metres)
- 1973–1983 - 1400 metres
- 1984 - 1350 metres
- 1985–1990 – 1300 metres
- 1991 - 1280 metres
- 1992–2001 - 1300 metres
- 2002–2006 - 1400 metres
- 2008 onwards - 1500 metres

=== Venue ===
- 1948–1983 - Rosehill Racecourse
- 1984 - Canterbury Park Racecourse
- 1985–1990 - Rosehill Racecourse
- 1991 - Canterbury Park Racecourse
- 1992 onwards - Rosehill Racecourse

== Winners ==
Past winners of the race are as follows.

- 2025 - Yorkshire
- 2024 - Private Eye
- 2023 - Phearson
- 2022 - Dajraan
- 2021 - Ellsberg
- 2020 - Outrageous
- 2019 - Ranier
- 2018 - My Nordic Hero
- 2017 - Testashadow
- 2016 - Sweet Redemption
- 2015 - Mighty Lucky
- 2014 - I'm Imposing
- 2013 - White Sage
- 2012 - Malavio
- 2011 - Monton
- 2010 - Dysphonia
- 2009 - Rabbuka
- 2008 (Dec.) - Voice Commander
- 2008 (Jan.) - Eremein
- 2007 - †Race not run
- 2006 - Utzon
- 2005 - Spirit Of Tara
- 2004 - Ike's Dream
- 2003 - This Manshood
- 2002 - This Manshood
- 2001 - Nanny Maroon
- 2000 - Adam
- 1999 - Highest Calibre
- 1998 - Monet's Cove
- 1997 - Masked Party
- 1996 - Sherwood
- 1995 - Garrin
- 1994 - Headstrong
- 1993 - Welsh Miner
- 1992 - Top Comedian
- 1991 - Fort Isle
- 1990 - Ice Cream Sundae
- 1989 - Dance Band
- 1988 - Tetue Topaze
- 1987 - Allamanda Boy
- 1986 - Plum Shore
- 1985 - At Sea
- 1984 - Manuan
- 1983 - Nosey Parker
- 1982 - Artist Man
- 1981 - Grey Receiver
- 1980 - Robrick Star
- 1979 - Mondiso
- 1978 - Tattenham Lad
- 1977 - Dream Pratten
- 1976 - Just Ideal
- 1975 - Purple Patch
- 1974 - Magic Beam
- 1973 - Barrier Star
- 1972 - Rocky Gold
- 1971 - Race not run
- 1970 - King Bogan
- 1969 - Regal Rhythm
- 1968 - Todvale
- 1967 - Victory Roll
- 1966 - Aureo
- 1965 - Castanea
- 1964 - Liege Lord
- 1963 - Miss Hiliers
- 1962 - Our Cobbler
- 1961 - Ginnagulla
- 1960 - Race not run
- 1959 - Boorala
- 1958 - Amneris
- 1957 - Indian Empire
- 1956 - Compound
- 1955 - Belbeiys
- 1954 - Blond Val
- 1953 - Bronze Peak
- 1952 - Forest Beau
- 1951 - Coniston
- 1950 - Hesdin
- 1949 - Blue Ensign
- 1948 - Cragside

† Race moved to January 2008 because of outbreak of equine influenza

== See also ==
- List of Australian Group races
- Group races
