= Glamourpuss =

Glamourpuss may refer to:

- Glamourpuss (comics), a Canadian independent comic book by Dave Sim
- Glamourpuss (album), an album by Sort Sol
- Glamour Puss, a New Zealand thoroughbred racemare
