= Begonia Belle Stakes =

Begonia Belle Stakes raced as Asahi Super Dry Sprint (2026)
- Class: Group 3
- Location: Flemington Racecourse, Melbourne, Australia
- Inaugurated: 2005
- Race type: Thoroughbred
- Sponsor: Asahi Super Dry (2026)

Race information
- Distance: 1,100 metres
- Surface: Turf
- Track: Left-handed
- Qualification: Mares, four-years-old and older
- Weight: Set weights with penalties
- Purse: A$240,000 (2026)

The Begonia Belle Stakes, raced as Asahi Super Dry Sprint (2026) is a registered Victoria Racing Club Group 3 Thoroughbred horse race for mares aged four years old and upwards, run at set weights with penalties, over a distance of 1100 metres, held annually at Flemington Racecourse, Melbourne, Australia in November during the VRC Spring Carnival on Victoria Derby Day.

== History ==
The registered race is named after Begonia Belle, winner of the 1969 Newmarket Handicap. The race was originally raced on the third day of the VRC Spring Carnival, VRC Oaks day but was moved in 2016 to the first day of the carnival.

=== Name ===
- 2005 - The Heaven Sprint
- 2006–2007 - Crown Trophy
- 2008 - Crown Promenade Trophy
- 2009–2010 - Crown Promenade Stakes
- 2011–2015 - G.H. Mumm Stakes
- 2016 - Sensis Stakes
- 2017 - Skip Sprint
- 2018-2024 - Furphy Sprint
- 2025 - Kirin Ichiban Sprint
- 2026 - Asahi Super Dry Sprint

=== Distance ===
- 2005 onwards - 1100 metres

=== Grade ===
- 2005–2008 - Handicap
- 2009–2013 - Listed Race
- 2013 onwards - Group 3 race

== Winners ==
The following are the past winners of the race.

- 2026 - Flying For Fun
- 2025 - New York Lustre
- 2024 - Isthimus
- 2023 - Queen Of The Ball
- 2022 - Asfoora
- 2021 - Minhaaj
- 2020 - Fiesta
- 2019 - Tofane
- 2018 - Divine Quality
- 2017 - Lyuba
- 2016 - Sheidel
- 2015 - Pittsburgh Flyer
- 2014 - Vain Queen
- 2013 - Dystopia
- 2012 - Honey Flower
- 2011 - Ortensia
- 2010 - Status Symbol
- 2009 - Very Discreet
- 2008 - Beaming
- 2007 - Soleil
- 2006 - Street Smart
- 2005 - Covet Thee

== See also ==
- Carbine Club Stakes (VRC)
- Coolmore Stud Stakes
- The Damien Oliver
- Empire Rose Stakes
- Rising Fast Stakes (Chatham Stakes)
- The Vanity
- Victoria Derby
- Wakeful Stakes
- List of Australian Group races
- Group races
