= Empire Rose Stakes =

Horse race in Melbourne, Australia

The Empire Rose Stakes
- Class: Group 1
- Location: Flemington Racecourse, Melbourne, Australia
- Inaugurated: 1988
- Race type: Thoroughbred
- Sponsor: TAB (2019-26)

Race information
- Distance: 1,600 metres
- Surface: Turf
- Qualification: Fillies and mares three years old and older
- Weight: Weight for Age
- Purse: $1,000,000 (2026)

The Empire Rose Stakes, is a Victoria Racing Club Group 1 Thoroughbred horse race held under Weight for Age conditions, for fillies and mares aged three-years-old and upwards, over a distance of 1600 metres, held at Flemington Racecourse, Melbourne, Australia during the VRC Spring Carnival on Victoria Derby day.

== History ==
The registered race is named after Empire Rose, the champion mare who won the 1988 LKS MacKinnon Stakes – Melbourne Cup double.

=== Name ===
- 1988–1992 - The Honda Legend
- 1993 - Hong Kong Bank Stakes
- 1994–2001 - Hardy Brothers Classic
- 2002–2004 - Nestle Peters Classic
- 2005–2017 - Myer Classic
- 2018 onwards - Empire Rose Stakes

=== Distance ===
- 1988 onwards - 1,600 metres

=== Grade ===
- 1988–1994 - Listed Race
- 1995–1996 - Group 3
- 1997–2003 - Group 2
- 2004 onwards - Group 1

== Winners ==
The following are past winners of the race.

- 2026 - Lady Shenandoah
- 2025 - Pride Of Jenni
- 2024 - Atishu
- 2023 - Pride Of Jenni
- 2022 - Icebath
- 2021 - Colette
- 2020 - Shout The Bar
- 2019 - Melody Belle
- 2018 - Shillelagh
- 2017 - Shoals
- 2016 - I Am A Star
- 2015 - Politeness
- 2014 - Bonaria
- 2013 - Red Tracer
- 2012 - Appearance
- 2011 - Hurtle Myrtle
- 2010 - Sacred Choice
- 2009 - Typhoon Tracy
- 2008 - Forensics
- 2007 - Divine Madonna
- 2006 - Lyrical Bid
- 2005 - Lotteria
- 2004 - Miss Potential
- 2003 - Zanna
- 2002 - Miss Zoe
- 2001 - Market Price
- 2000 - Super Sequel
- 1999 - Noircir
- 1998 - Bonanova
- 1997 - Prairie
- 1996 - Rose of Portland
- 1995 - Aunty Mary
- 1994 - Sedately
- 1993 - Mingling Glances
- 1992 - Excited Angel
- 1991 - Western Chorus
- 1990 - Natural Wonder
- 1989 - Echo Lass
- 1988 - Concordance

== See also ==
- Begonia Belle Stakes
- Carbine Club Stakes (VRC)
- Coolmore Stud Stakes
- The Damien Oliver
- Rising Fast Stakes (Chatham Stakes)
- The Vanity
- Victoria Derby
- Wakeful Stakes
- List of Australian Group races
- Group races
