= Wakeful Stakes =

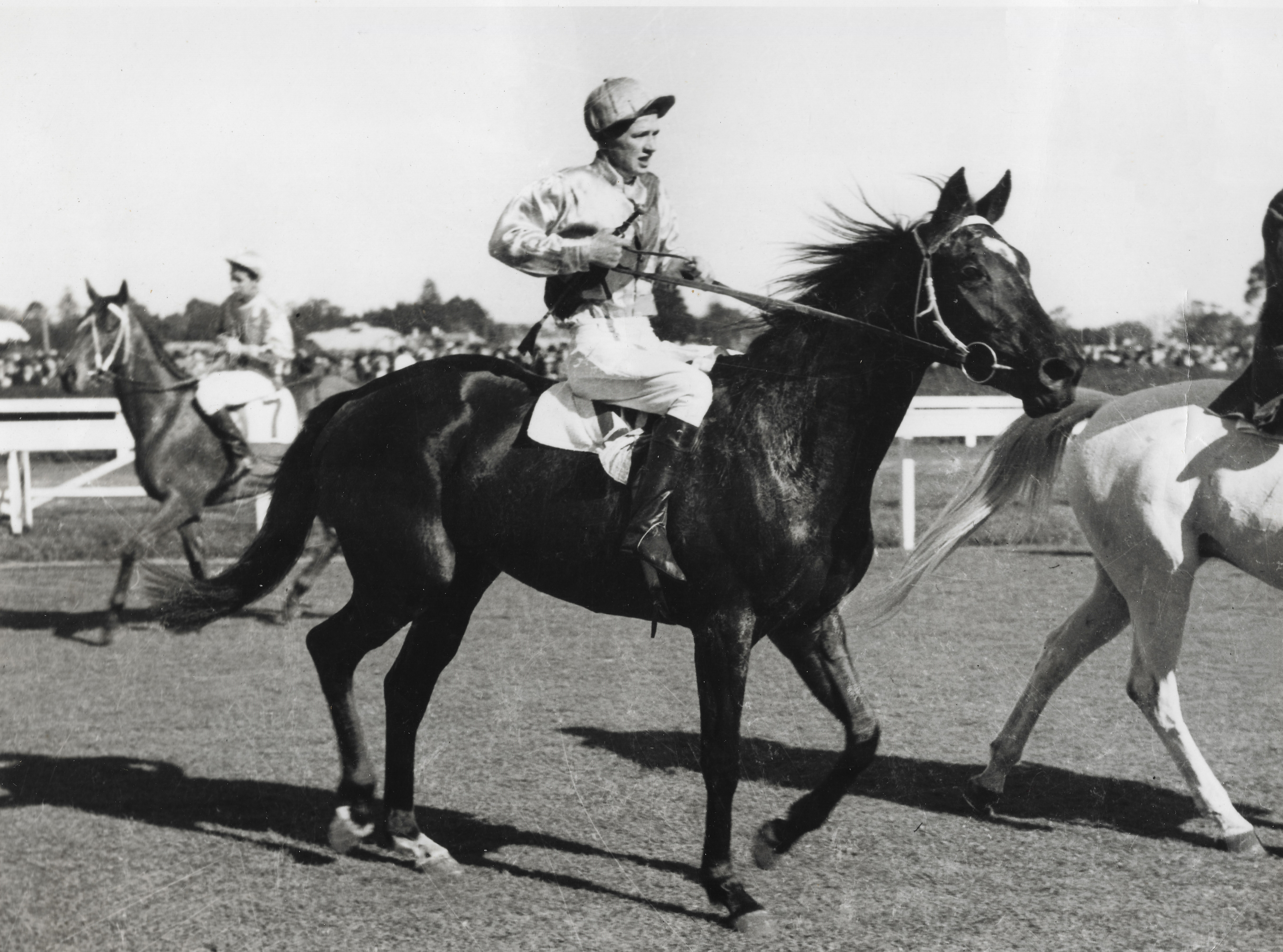
- Chicquita, 1949 winner
- Class: Group 2
- Location: Flemington Racecourse
- Inaugurated: 1932
- Race type: Thoroughbred
- Sponsor: HKJC World Pool (2024-2026)

Race information
- Distance: 2,000 metres
- Surface: Turf
- Qualification: Three year old fillies
- Weight: Set weights with penalties
- Purse: $300,000 (2026)

The Wakeful Stakes is a Victoria Racing Club Group 2 Thoroughbred horse race for three-year-old fillies, run under set weights with penalties conditions, over 2,000 metres at Flemington Racecourse, Melbourne, Australia on Victoria Derby Day.

== History ==
The race is considered the main lead in to the Crown Oaks which is raced five days later over 2,500 metres on the third day of the VRC Spring Carnival. Thirty-five fillies have completed the Wakeful Stakes – VRC Oaks double.

=== Name ===
The race is named after Wakeful, the champion mare of the early 20th century, who won the Melbourne Stakes three times (1901–1903), the predecessor to the LKS MacKinnon Stakes which was run on the same day as this event prior to 2016.

=== Distance ===
- 1932–1953 - 1 mile (~1600 metres)
- 1968–1971 - 1 1/4 miles (~2000 metres)
- 1972 onwards - 2000 metres

=== Grade ===
- 1932–1978 - Principal Race
- 1979 onwards - Group 2

=== 1954 racebook ===
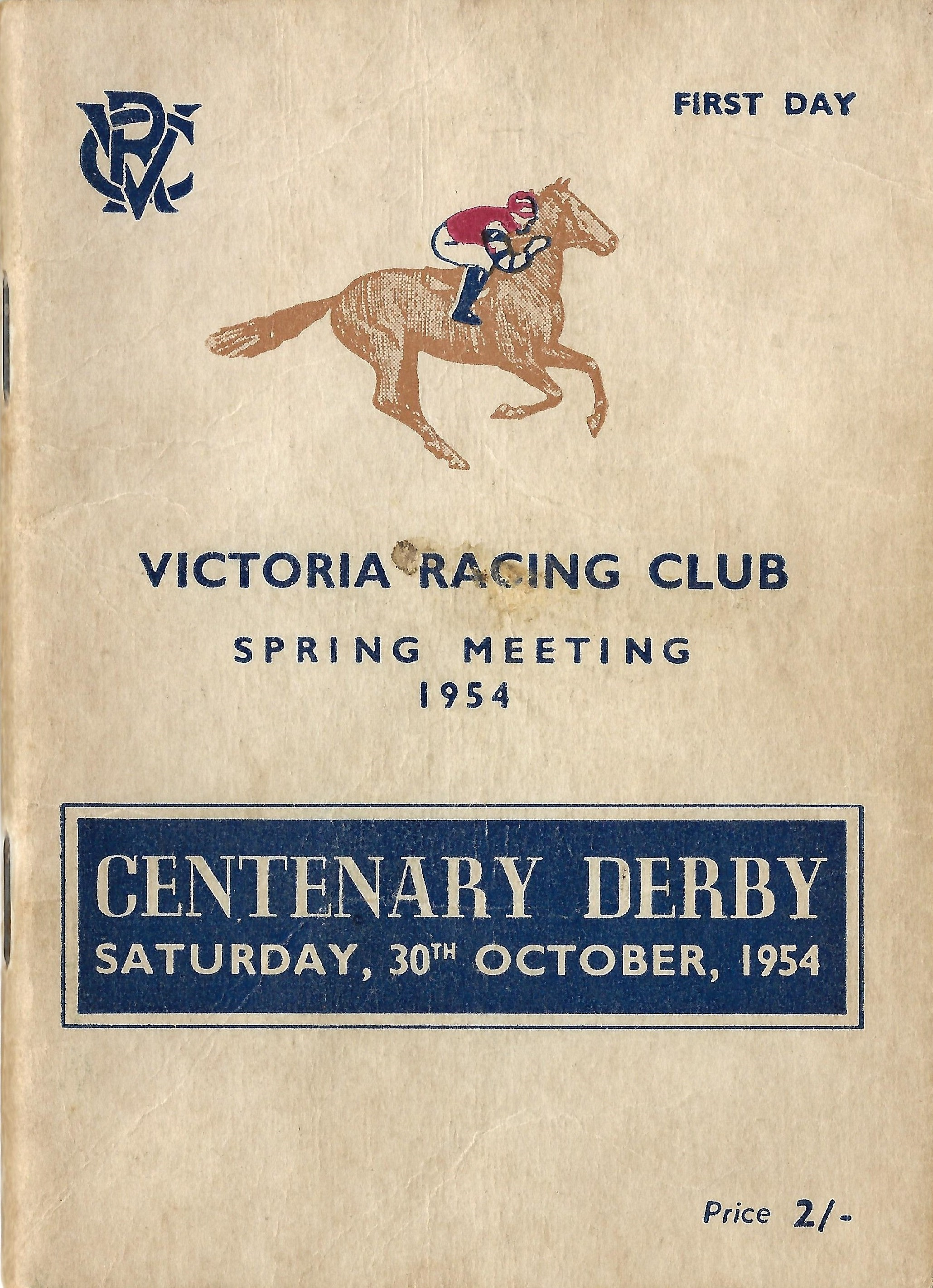
1954 VRC Derby racebook front cover

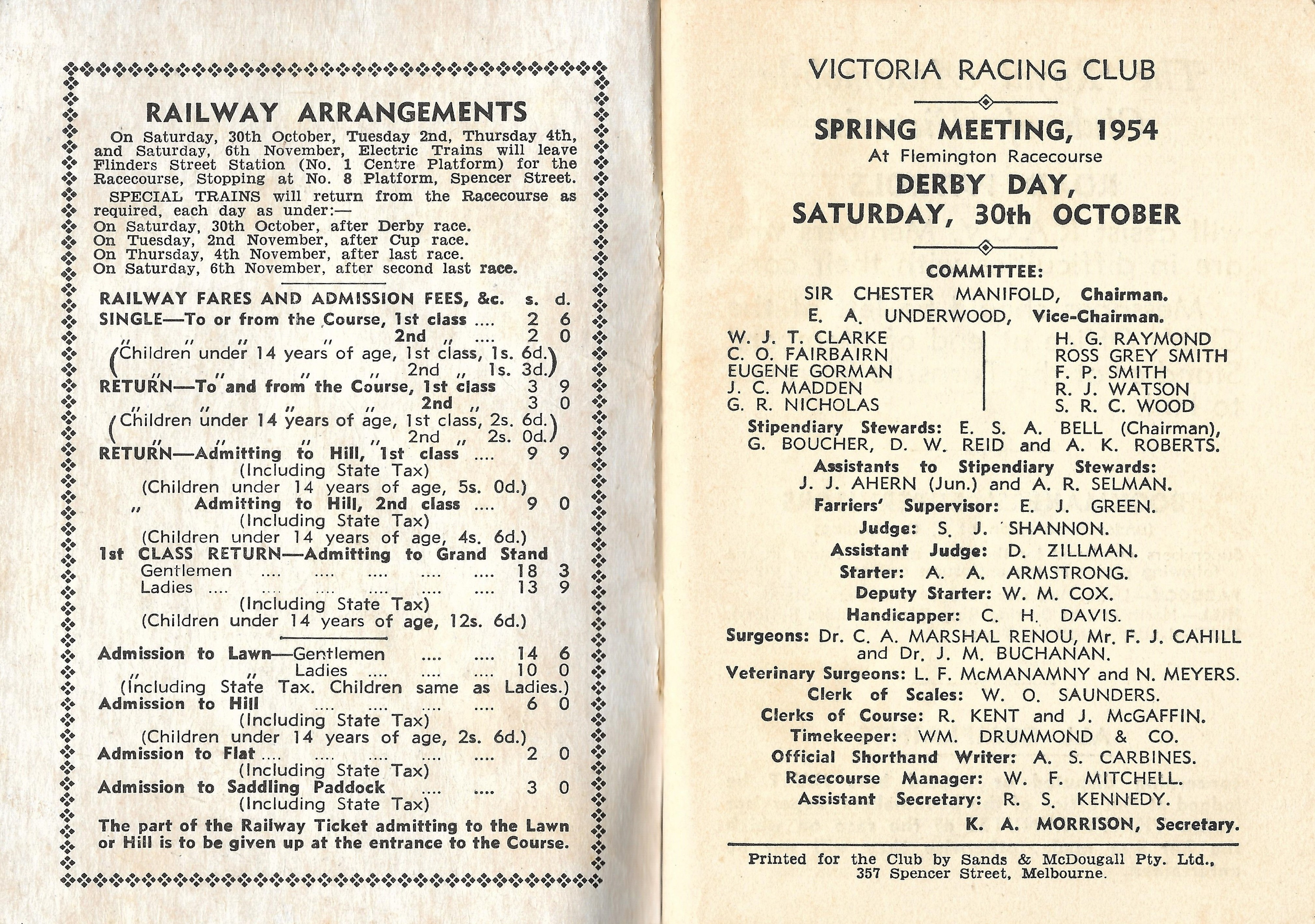
1954 VRC Derby raceday officials

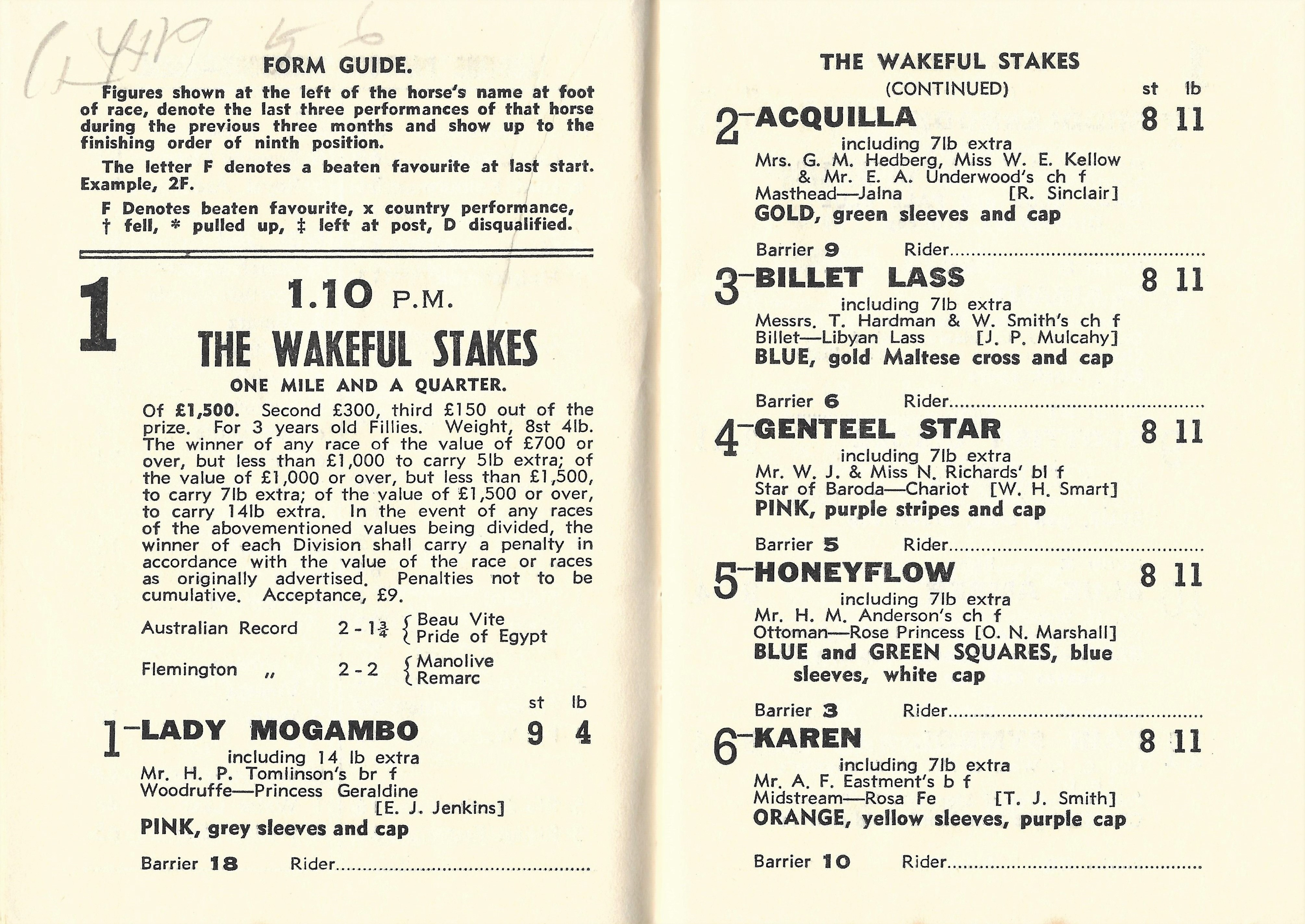
1954 VRC Wakeful Stakes page starters and results

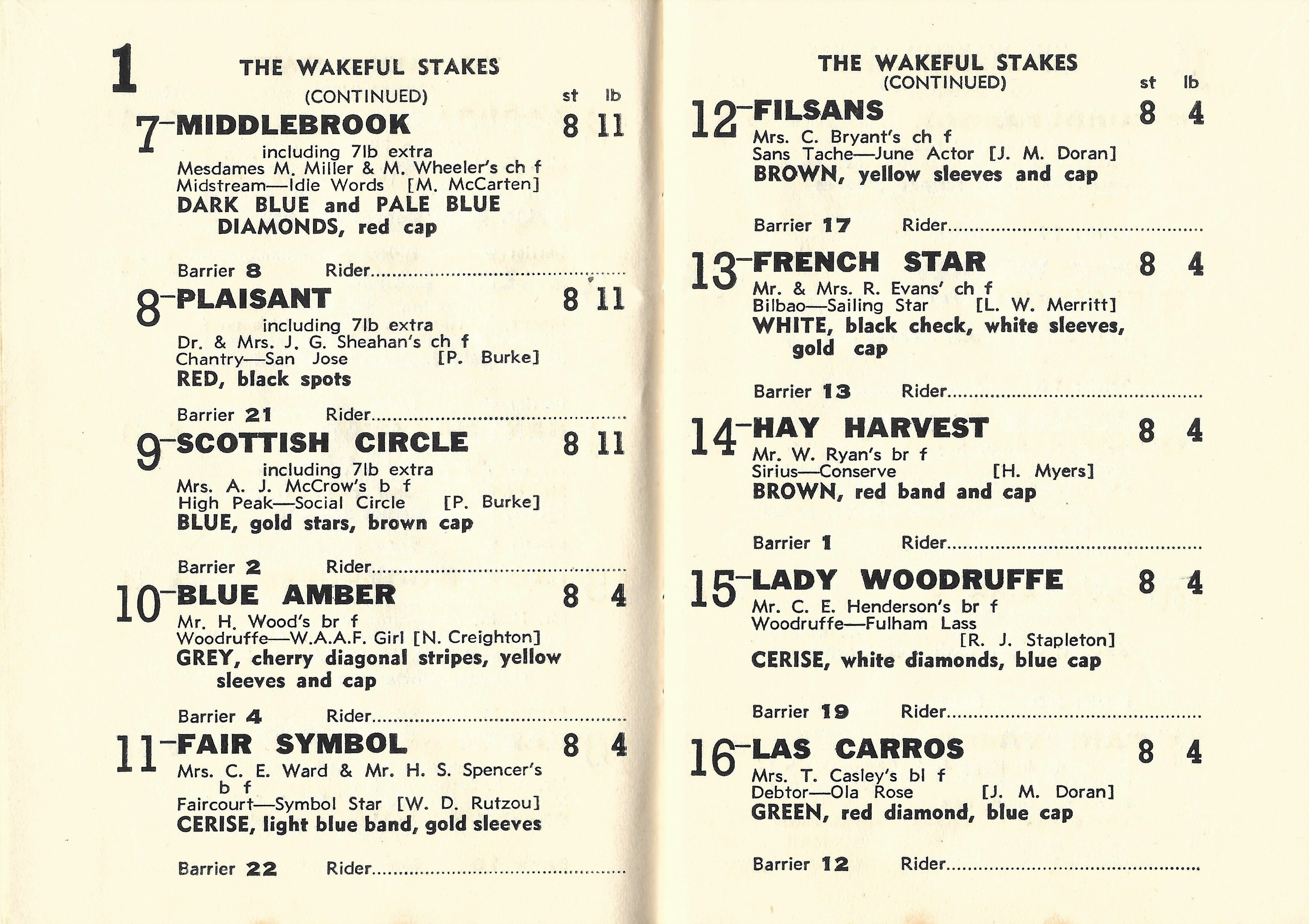
1954 VRC Wakeful Stakes page showing the winner, Blue Amber

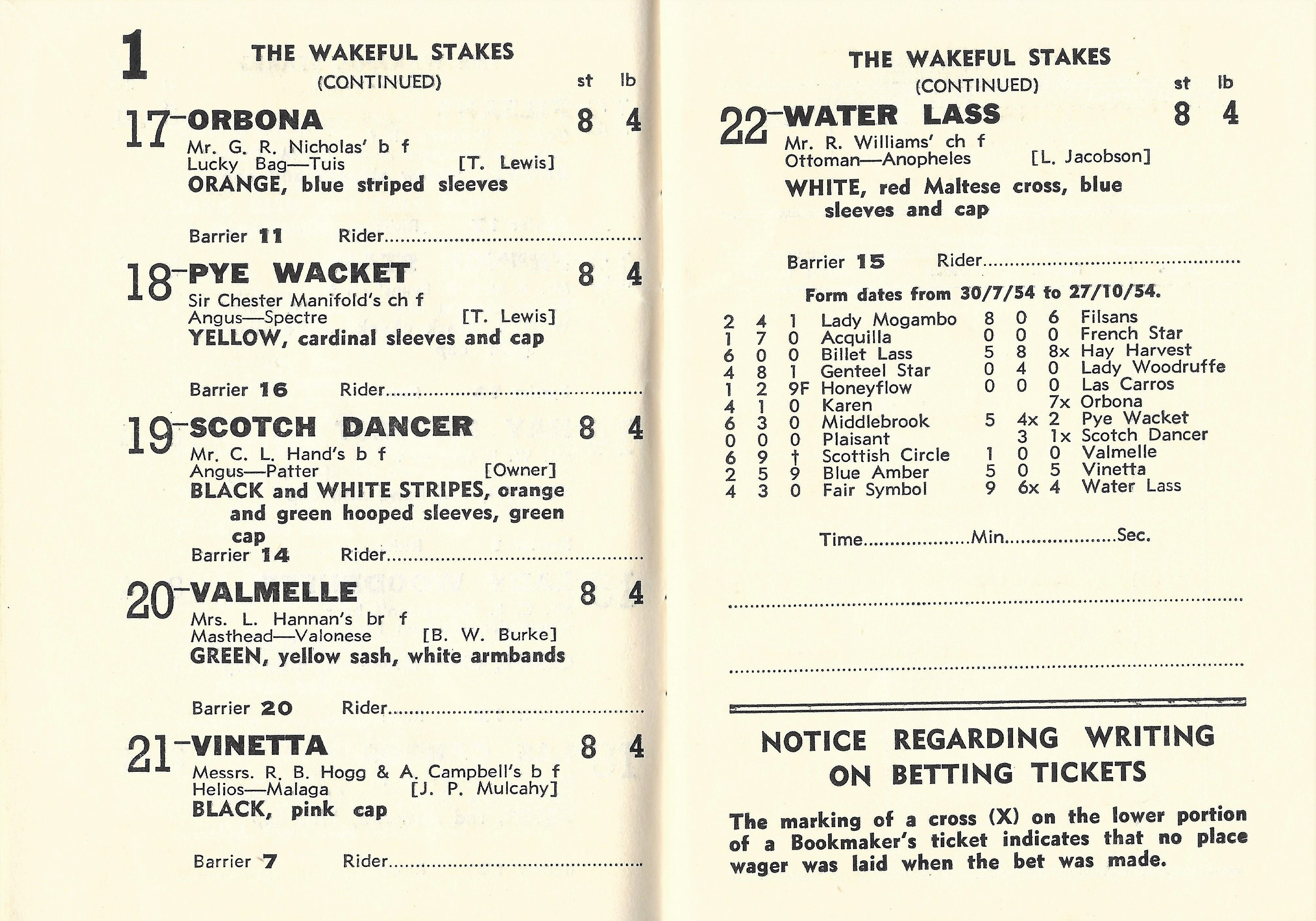
1954 VRC Wakeful Stakes page starters and results

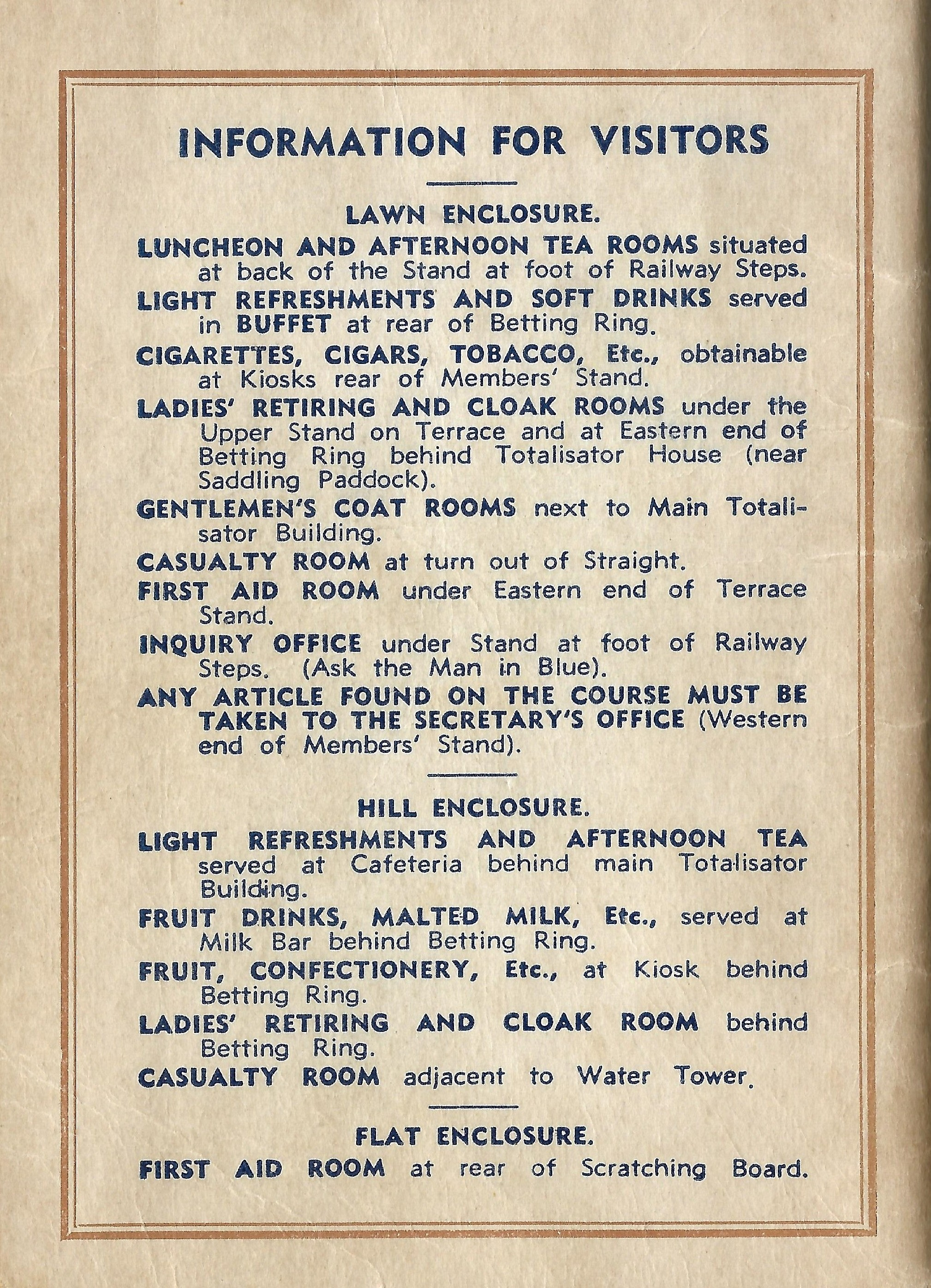
Back cover showing enclosure information for visitors

== Winners ==
The following are past winners of the race.

- 2026 - De Armus
- 2025 - Getta Good Feeling
- 2024 - Treasurethe Moment
- 2023 - Amazonian Lass
- 2022 - Zennzella
- 2021 - Willowy
- 2020 - Victoria Quay
- 2019 - Miami Bound
- 2018 - Aristia
- 2017 - Luvaluva
- 2016 - Tiamo Grace
- 2015 - Ambience
- 2014 - Thunder Lady
- 2013 - Kirramosa
- 2012 - Zydeco
- 2011 - Atlantic Jewel
- 2010 - Brazilian Pulse
- 2009 - Faint Perfume
- 2008 - Rocha
- 2007 - Zarita
- 2006 - Tuesday Joy
- 2005 - Serenade Rose
- 2004 - Hollow Bullet
- 2003 - Timbourina
- 2002 - Hierogram
- 2001 - Quays
- 2000 - Lolita Star
- 1999 - My Sienna
- 1998 - Grand Archway
- 1997 - Kensington Palace
- 1996 - Danendri
- 1995 - Saleous
- 1994 - Dream Of The Dance
- 1993 - Arborea
- 1992 - Love Comes To Town
- 1991 - Richfield Lady
- 1990 - Beachside
- 1989 - Tristanagh
- 1988 - Research
- 1987 - Imposera
- 1986 - Diamond Shower
- 1985 - Heat Of The Moment
- 1984 - Our Lafite
- 1983 - La Caissiere
- 1982 - Royal Regatta
- 1981 - Sheraco
- 1980 - November Rain
- 1979 - Brava Jeannie
- 1978 - Scomeld
- 1977 - Sun Sally
- 1976 - Savoir
- 1975 - † How Now / Calera
- 1974 - Leica Show
- 1973 - † Love Aloft / Just Topic
- 1972 - Toltrice
- 1971 - Kazanlik
- 1970 - Sanderae
- 1969 - Glad Rags
- 1968 - With Respect
- 1967 - Eld
- 1966 - Star Belle
- 1965 - Fire Band
- 1964 - Light Fingers
- 1963 - Raindear
- 1962 - Lady Marg
- 1961 - Indian Summer
- 1960 - Wenona Girl
- 1959 - Weeamera
- 1958 - Chicola
- 1957 - Amneris
- 1956 - Sandara
- 1955 - Evening Peal
- 1954 - Blue Amber
- 1953 - Caramba
- 1952 - Just Caroline
- 1951 - La Castana
- 1950 - True Course
- 1949 - Chicquita
- 1948 - Grey Nurse
- 1947 - † Nizam's Ring / Jalna
- 1946 - Sweet Chime
- 1945 - Marocain
- 1944 - Rainbird
- 1943 - Three Wheeler
- 1942 - East End
- 1941 - Kelos
- 1940 - Session
- 1939 - Snow White
- 1938 - Early Bird
- 1937 - Prairie Moon
- 1936 - Siren
- 1935 - Link Divine
- 1934 - Arachne
- 1933 - Golden Hair
- 1932 - Protea

Notes:
† Run in divisions
Fillies in italics completed the Wakeful Stakes – VRC Oaks double

== See also ==
- Carbine Club Stakes (VRC)
- Coolmore Stud Stakes
- The Damien Oliver
- Empire Rose Stakes
- Kirin Ichiban Sprint (Begonia Belle Stakes)
- Rising Fast Stakes (Chatham Stakes)
- The Vanity
- Victoria Derby
- List of Australian Group races
- Group races
