= The Damien Oliver =

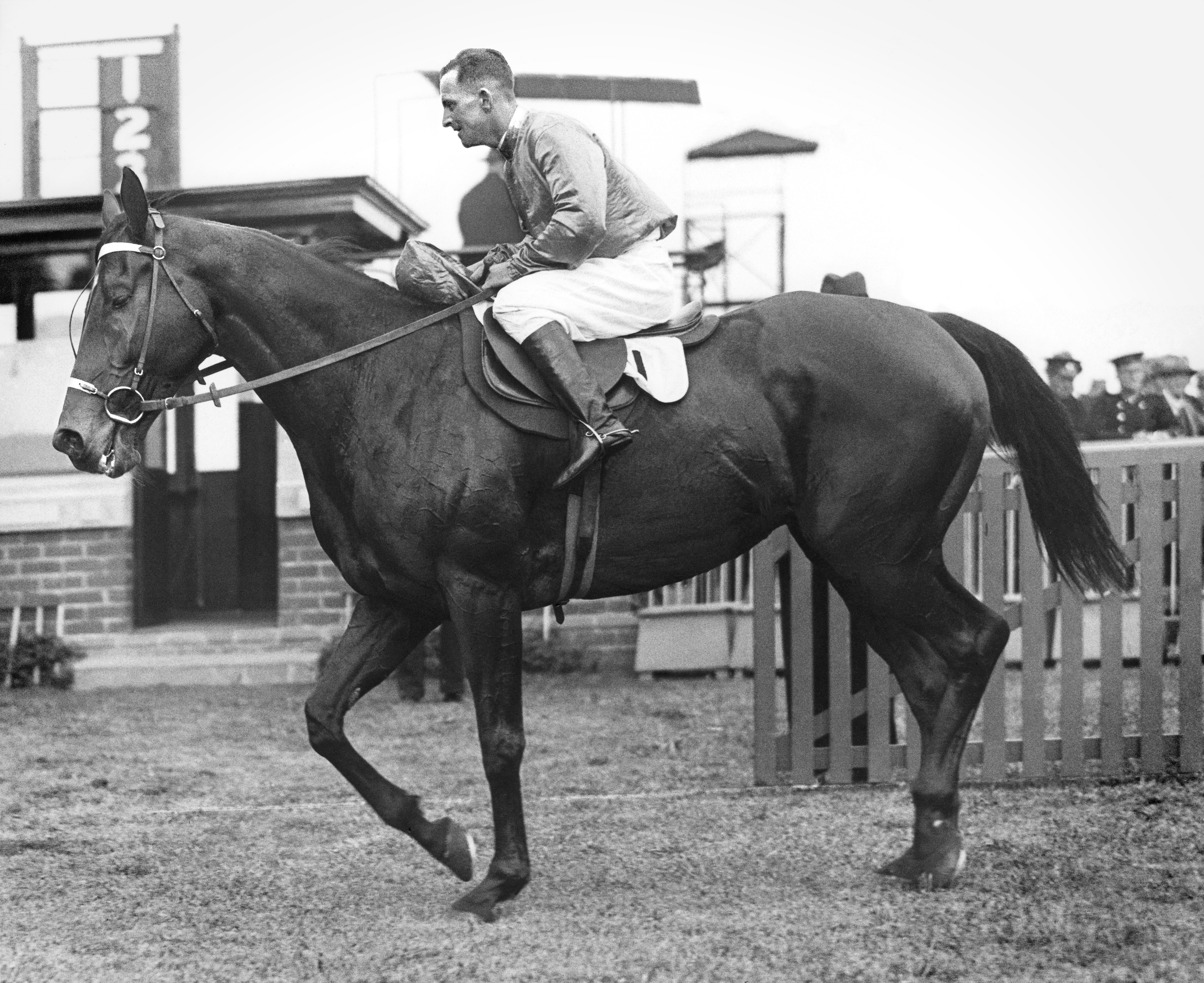
- Amounis –1926, 1927 & 1929; Linlithgow Stakes winner
- Class: Group 2
- Location: Flemington Racecourse
- Inaugurated: 1868 (as Flying Stakes)
- Race type: Thoroughbred
- Sponsor: ABC Bullion (2026)

Race information
- Distance: 1,400 metres
- Surface: Turf
- Qualification: Three year olds and older that are not maidens
- Weight: Open handicap
- Purse: $500,000 (2026)

The Damien Oliver, formerly known as the Linlithgow Stakes, is a registered Victoria Racing Club Group 2 Thoroughbred open handicap horse race, held over a distance of 1400 metres annually at Flemington Racecourse in Melbourne, during the VRC Spring Racing Carnival.

== History ==
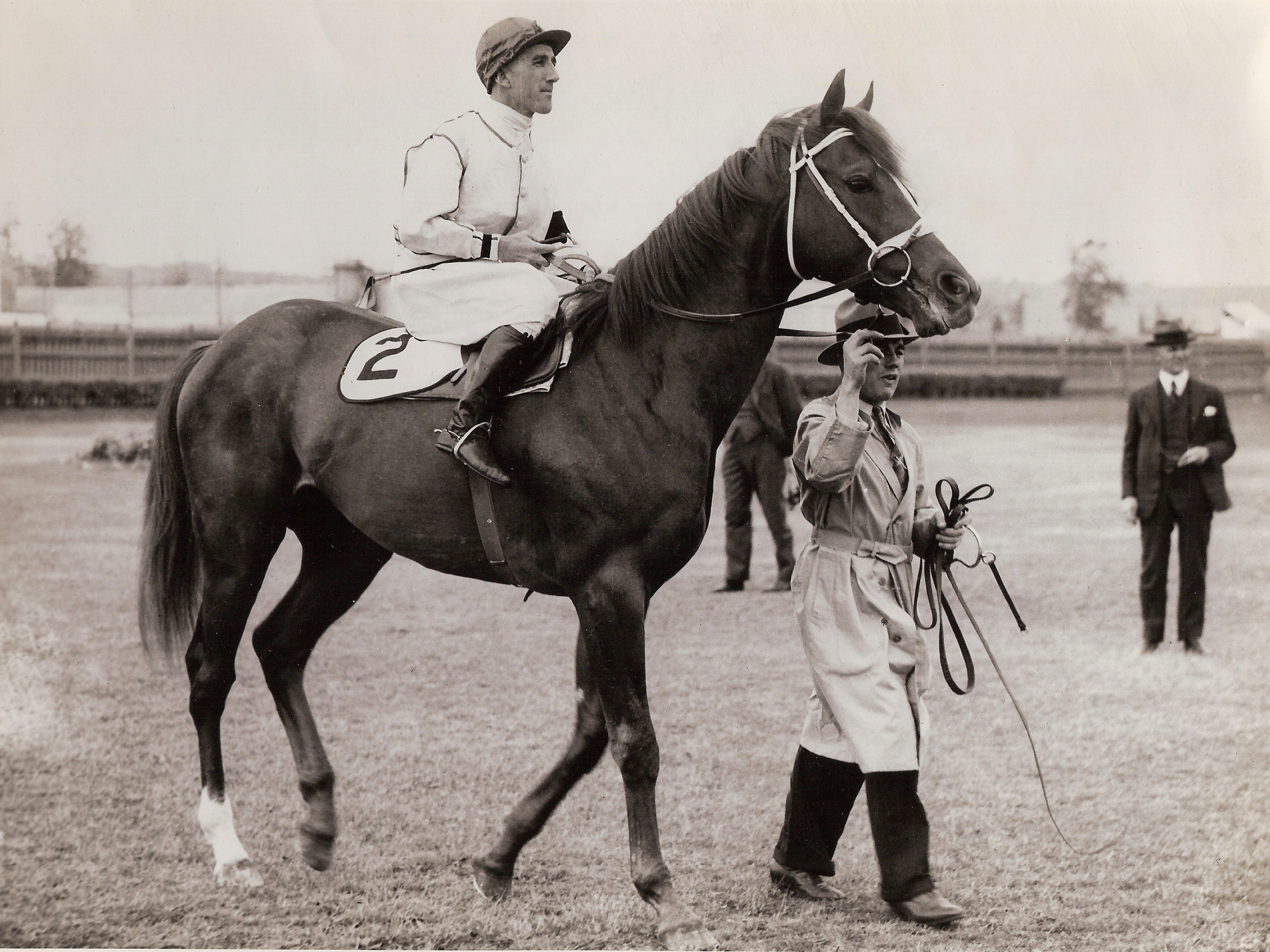
Ajax, 1937, 1938 winner

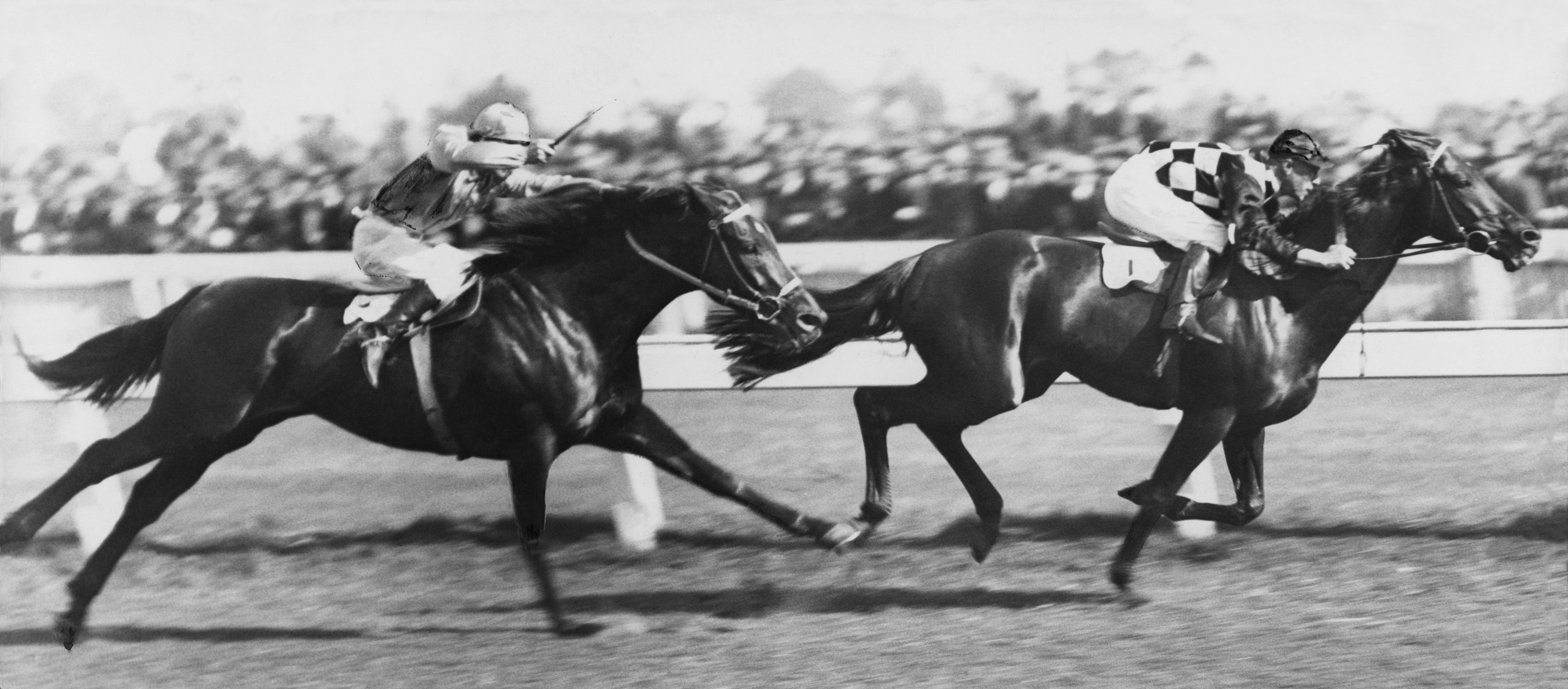
Gothic, 1928 winner

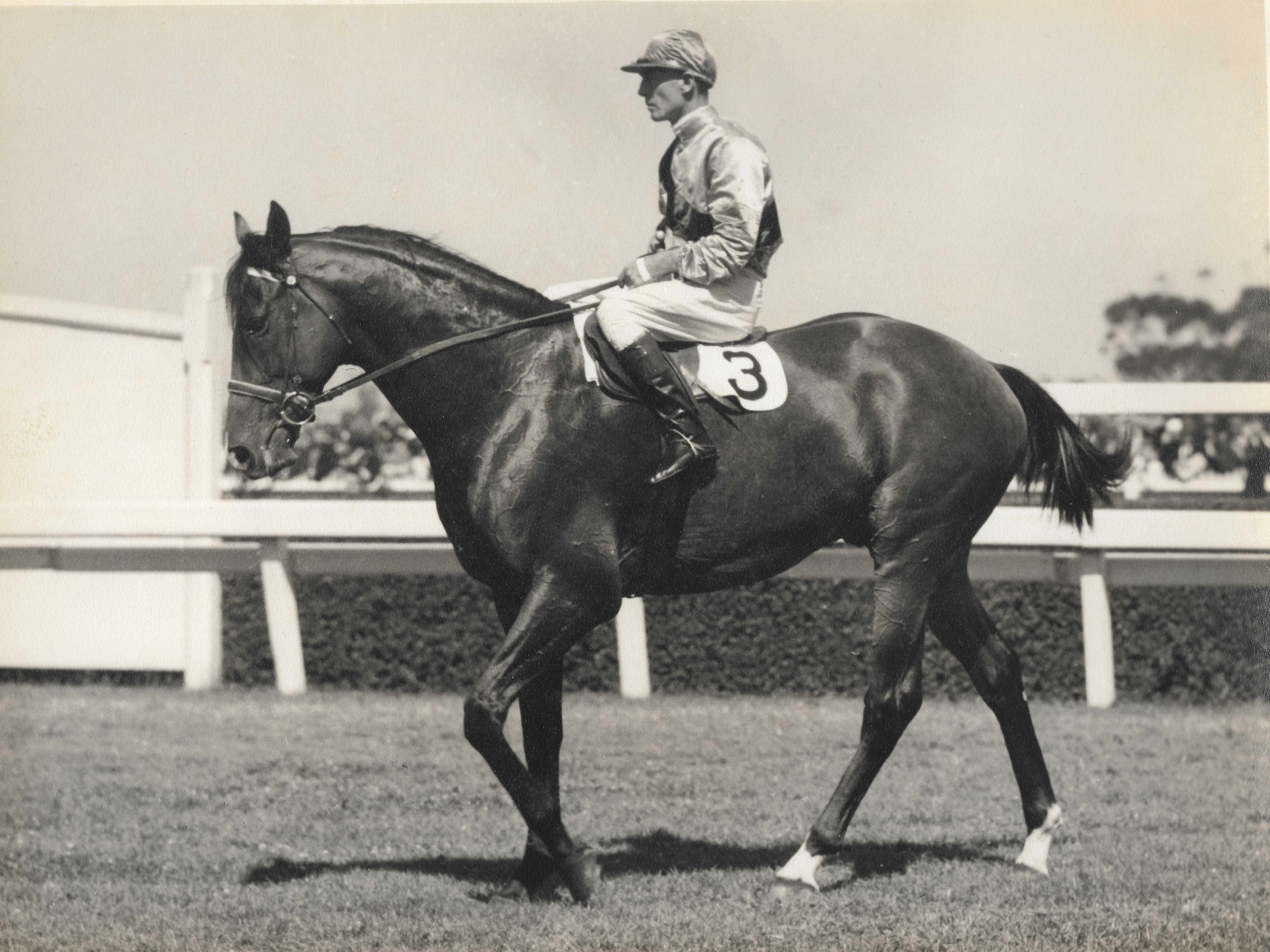
High Caste, 1939, 1940, 1941 winner

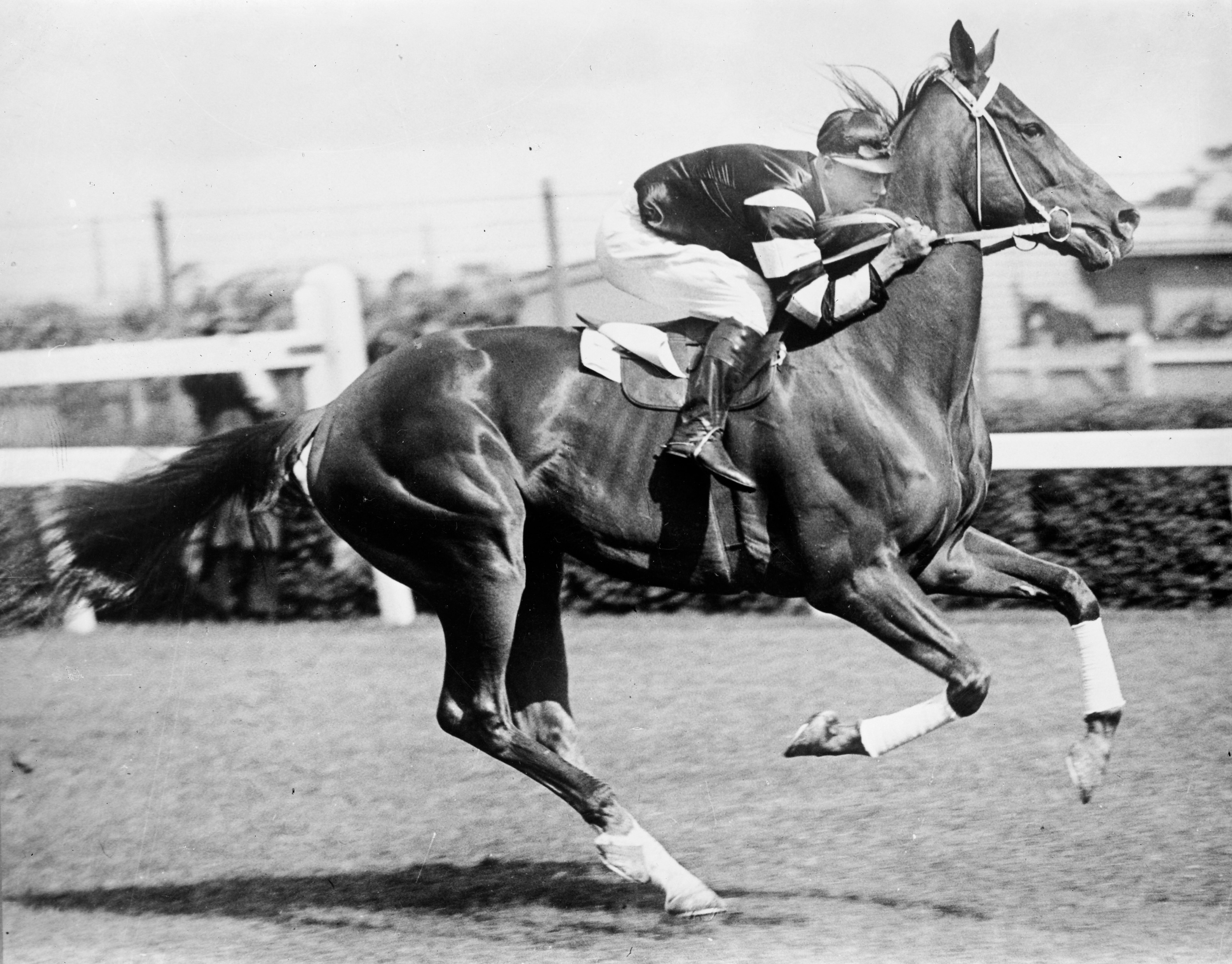
Phar Lap, 1930 winner

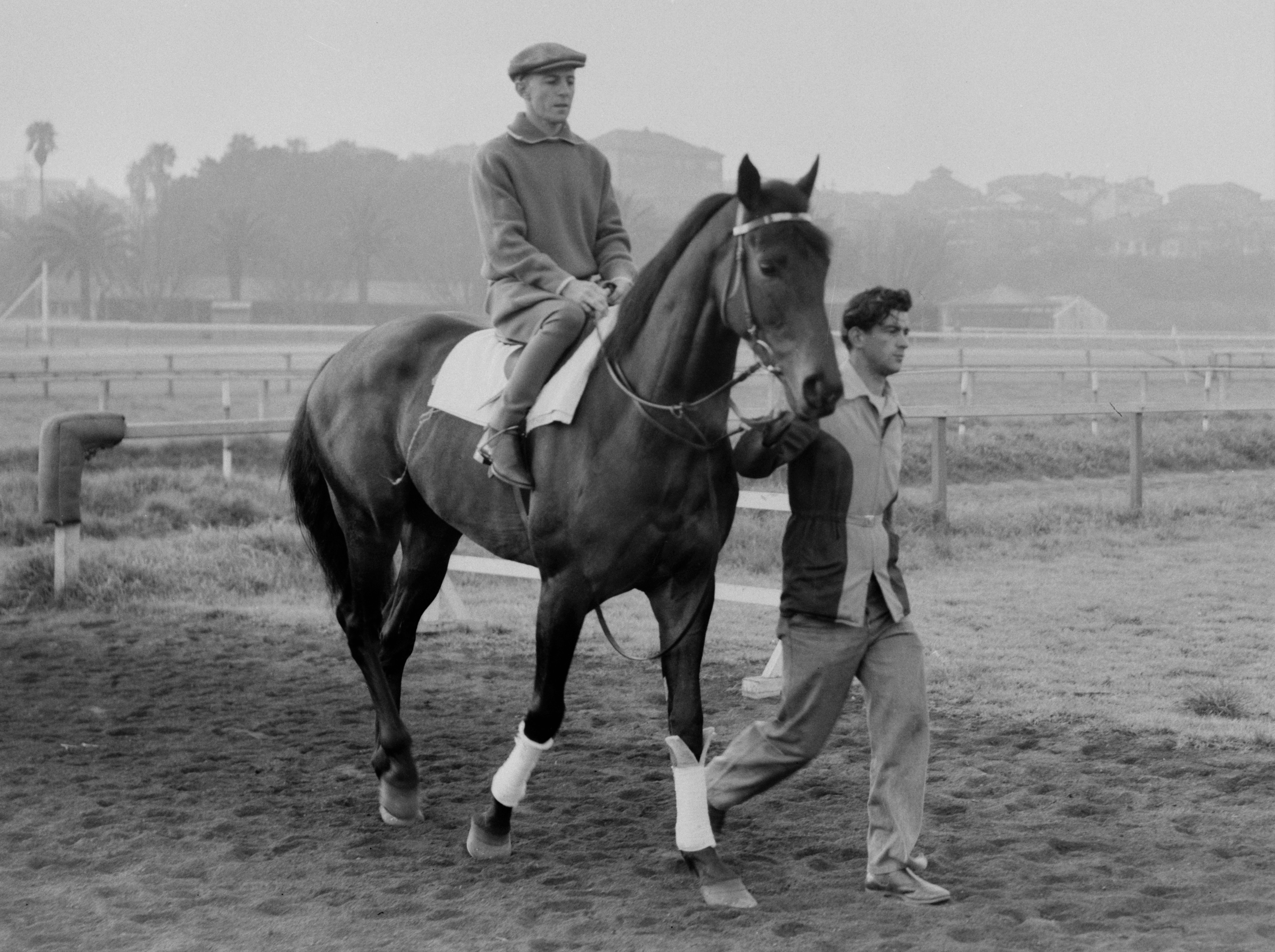
Prince Cortauld, 1954 winner

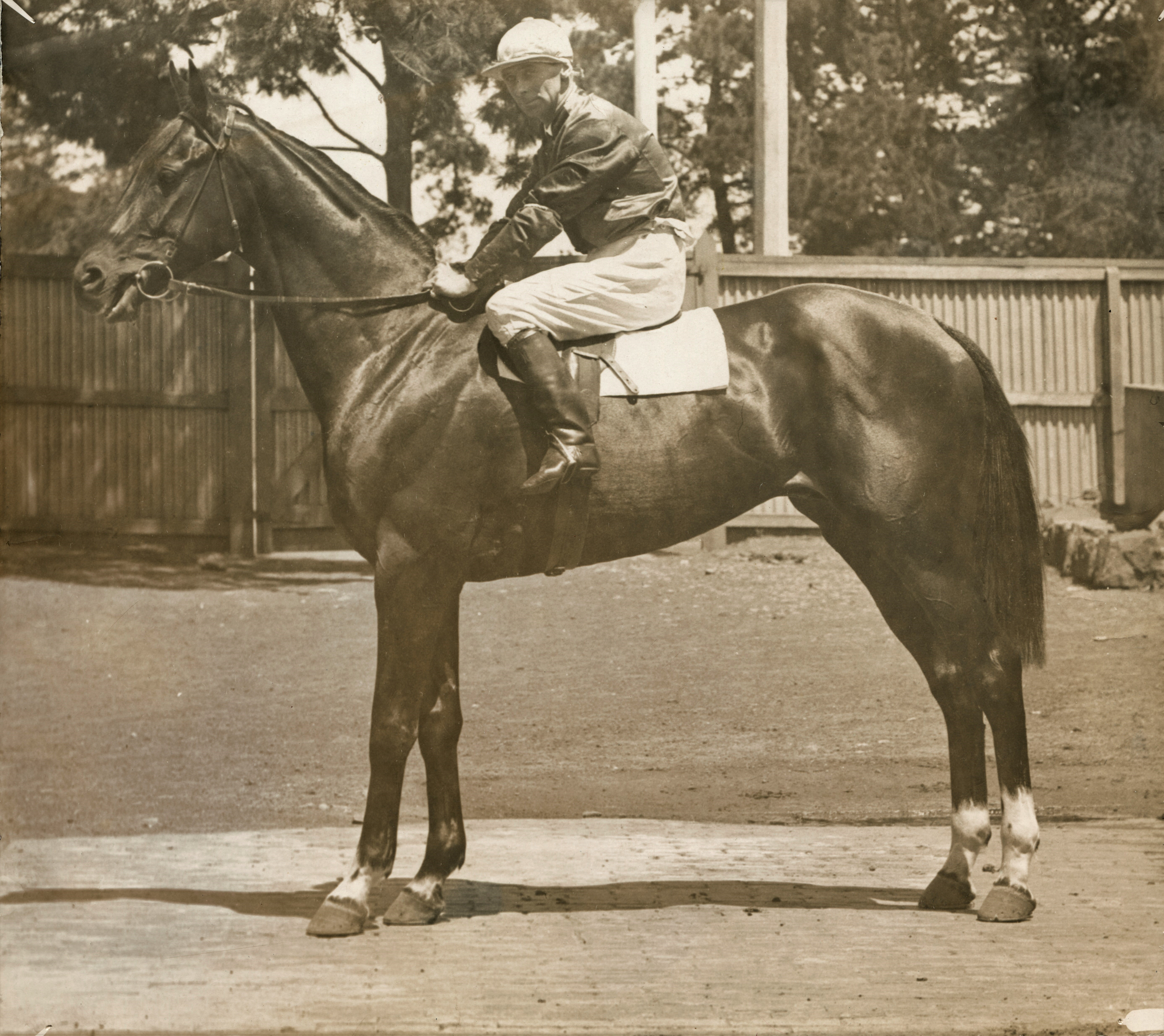
Biplane, 1917 winner B Deeley

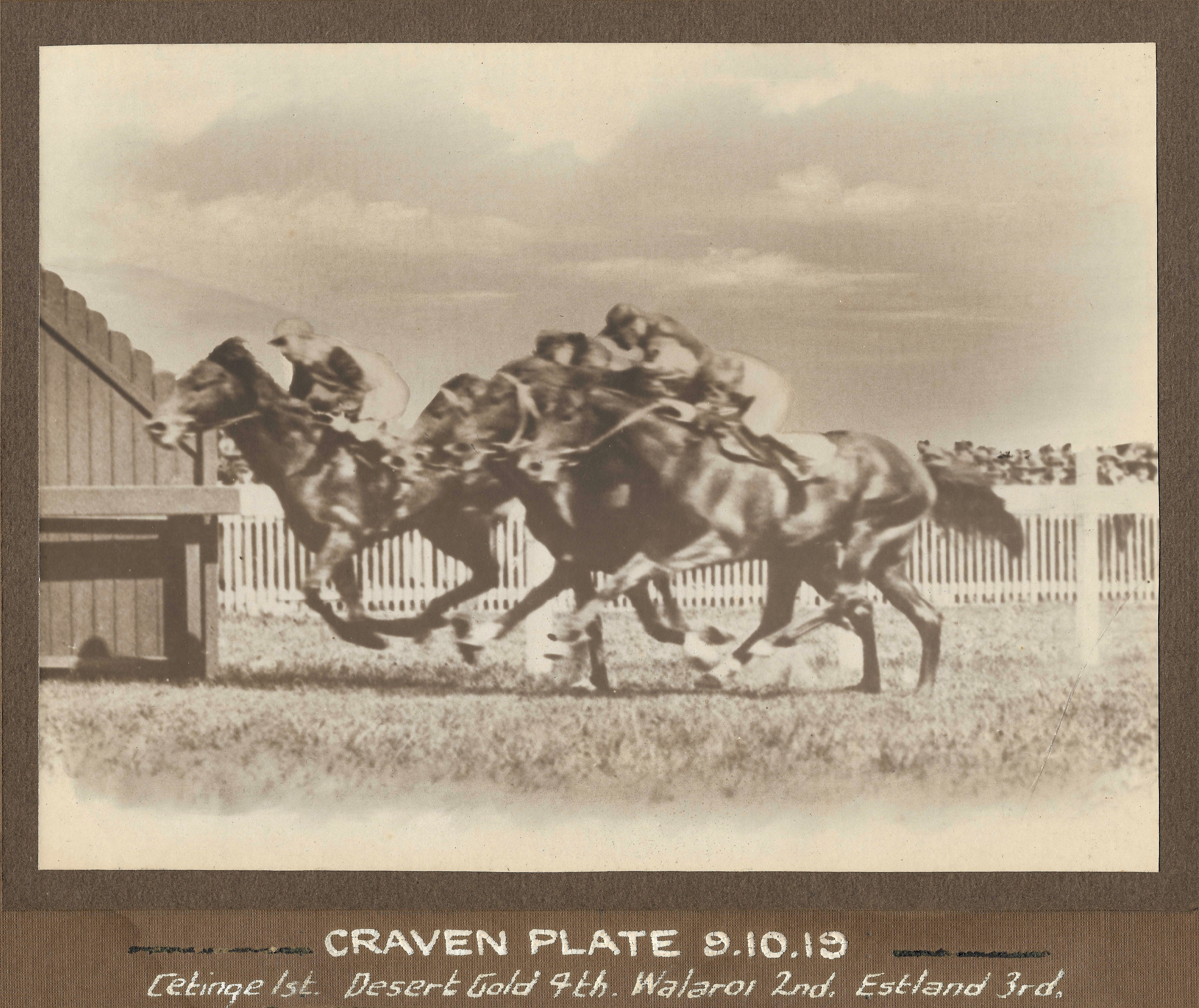
Cetigne, 1919 winner

The event when raced as the Linlithgow Stakes was under Weight For Age Conditions. Prior to 2006 the race was held on VRC Oaks Day. In 2007 the race was run on the last day of the VRC Spring Carnival. Since 2008 the race has been scheduled on Victoria Derby day.

For three years during World War II the race was not held.

=== 1934, 1950, 1952 racebooks ===
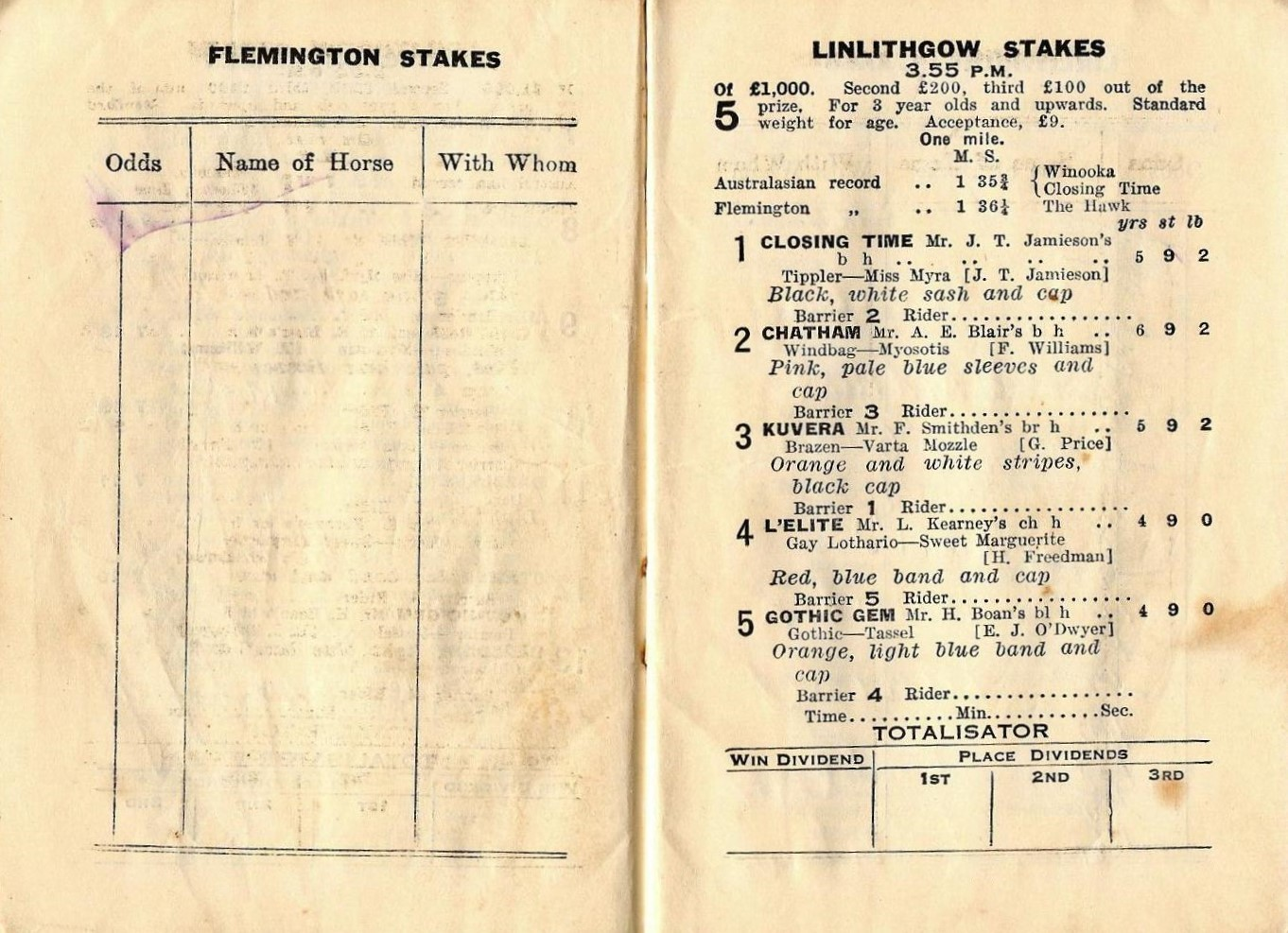
1934 VRC Linlithgow Stakes racebook winner, Closing Time

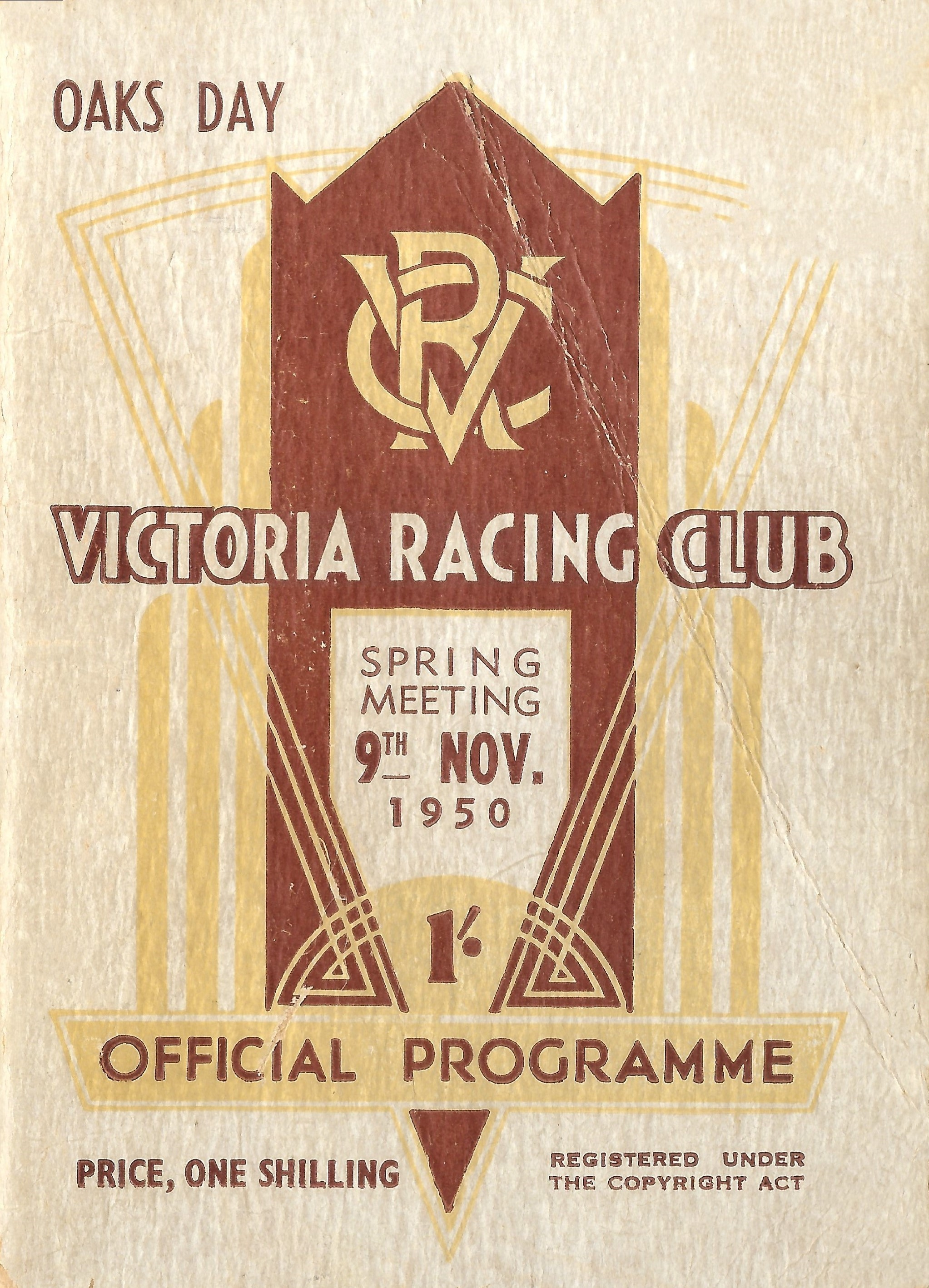
1950 VRC Oaks Stakes racebook front cover

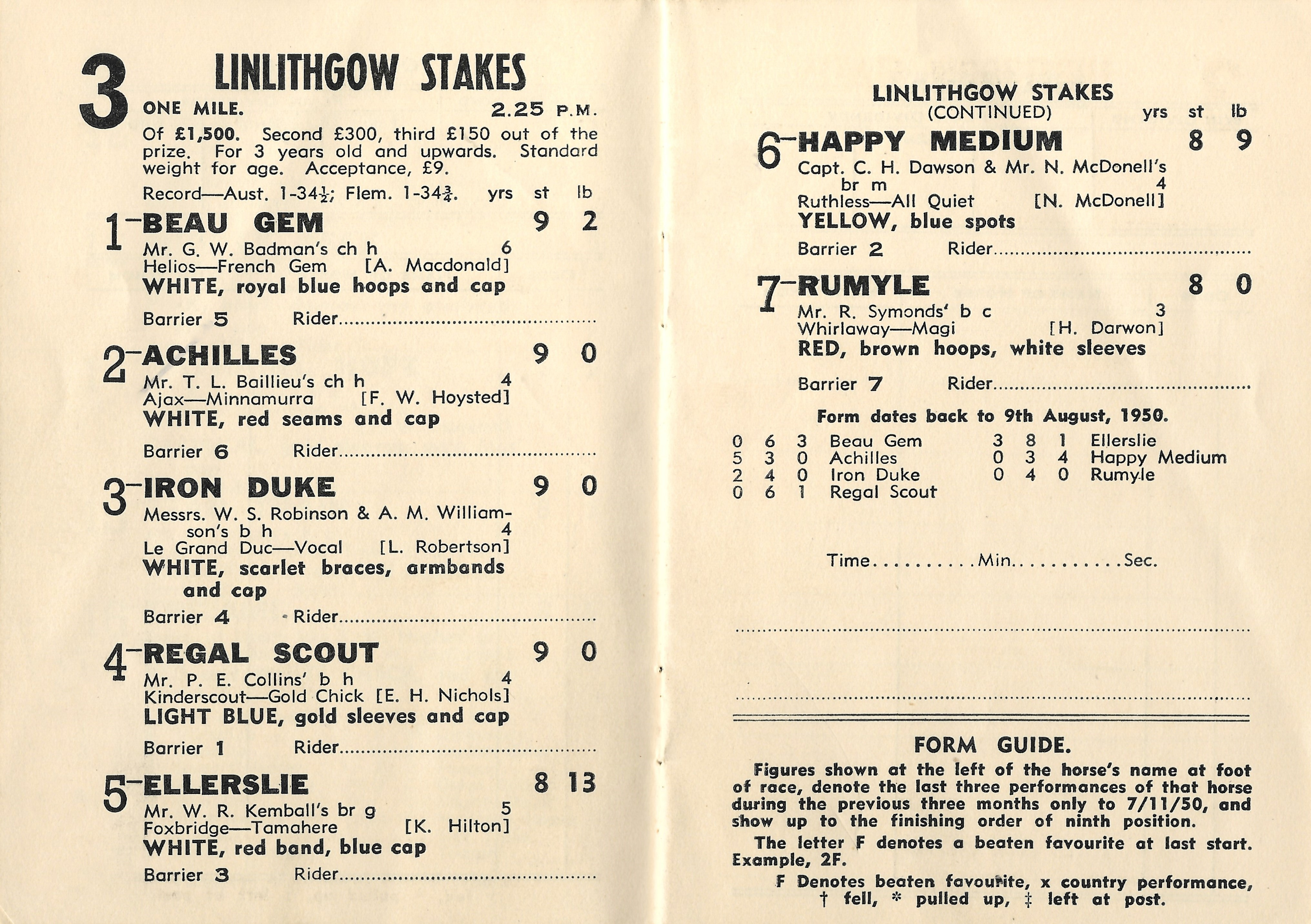
1950 VRC Linlithgow Stakes winner, Ellerslie

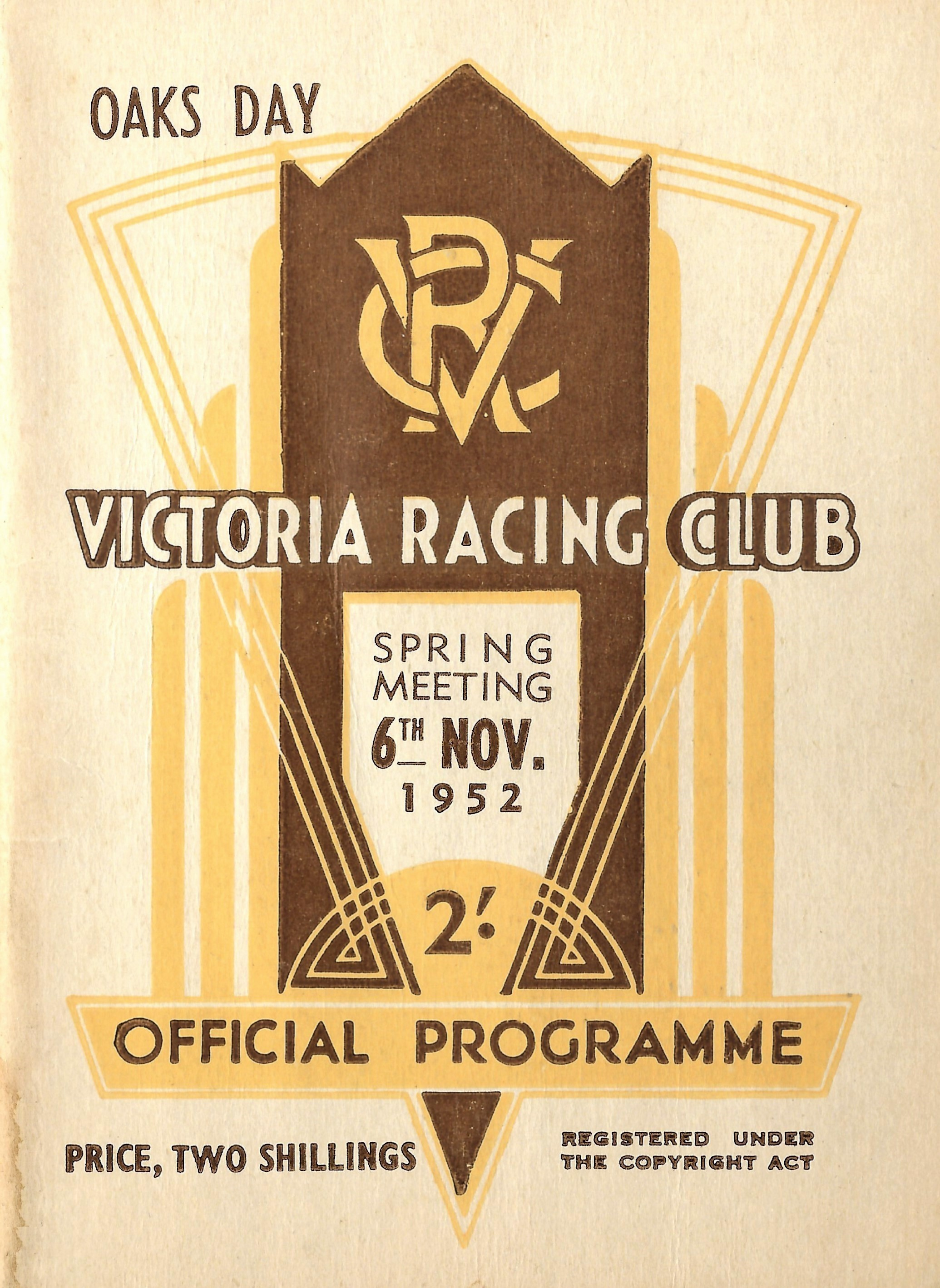
1952 VRC Oaks Stakes racebook front cover

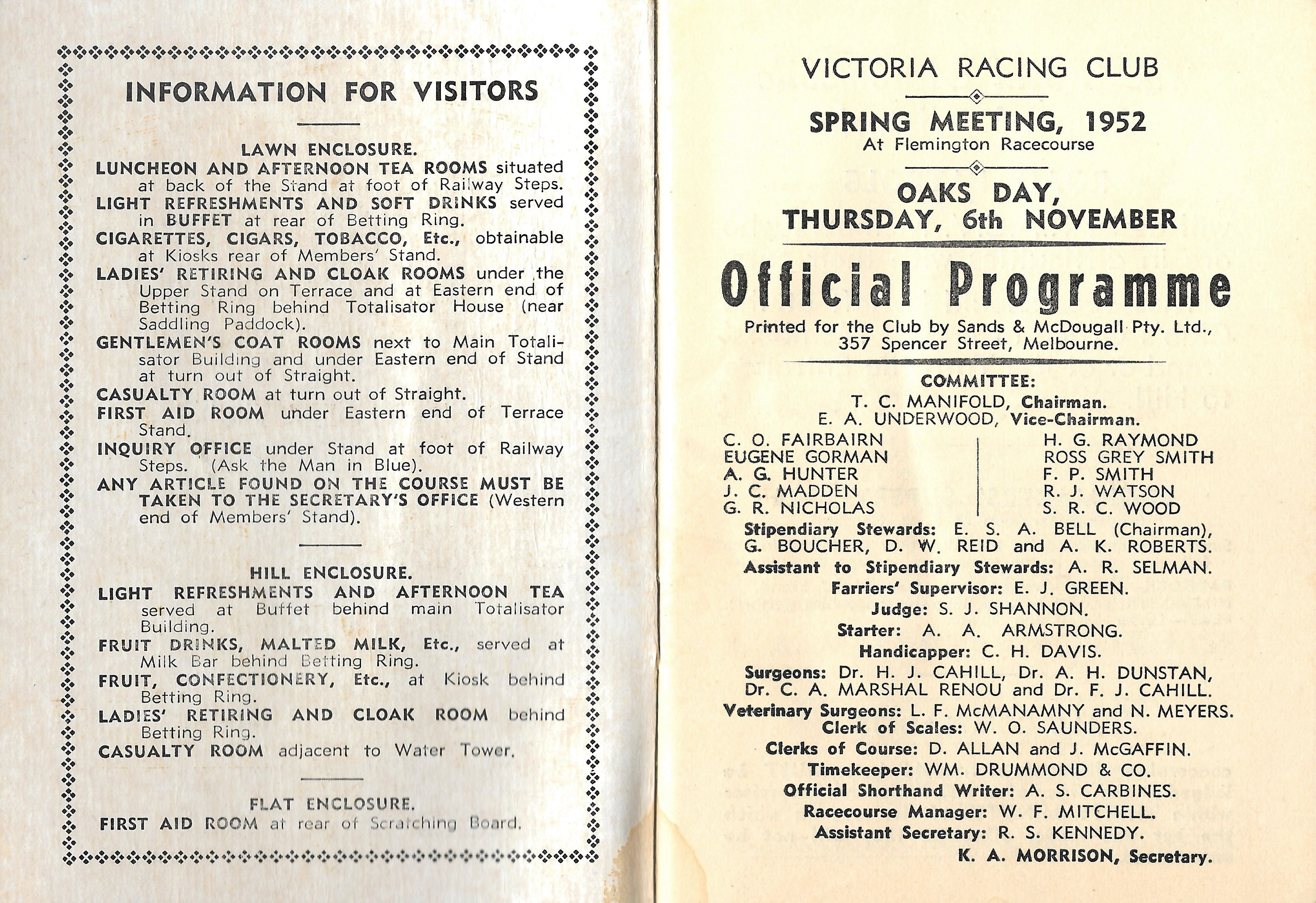
1952 VRC Linlithgow Stakes page showing raceday officials

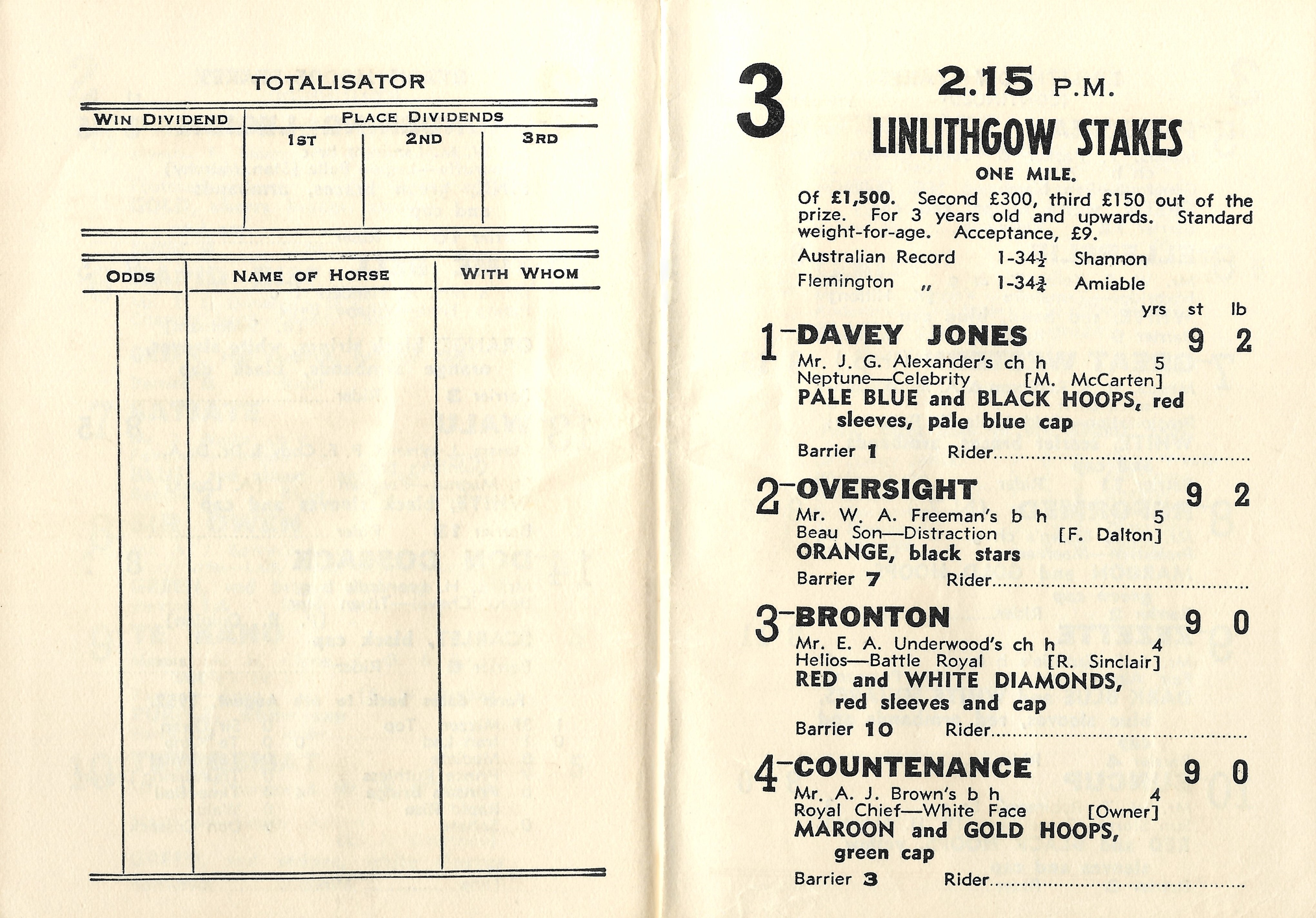
1952 VRC Linlithgow Stakes page starters and results

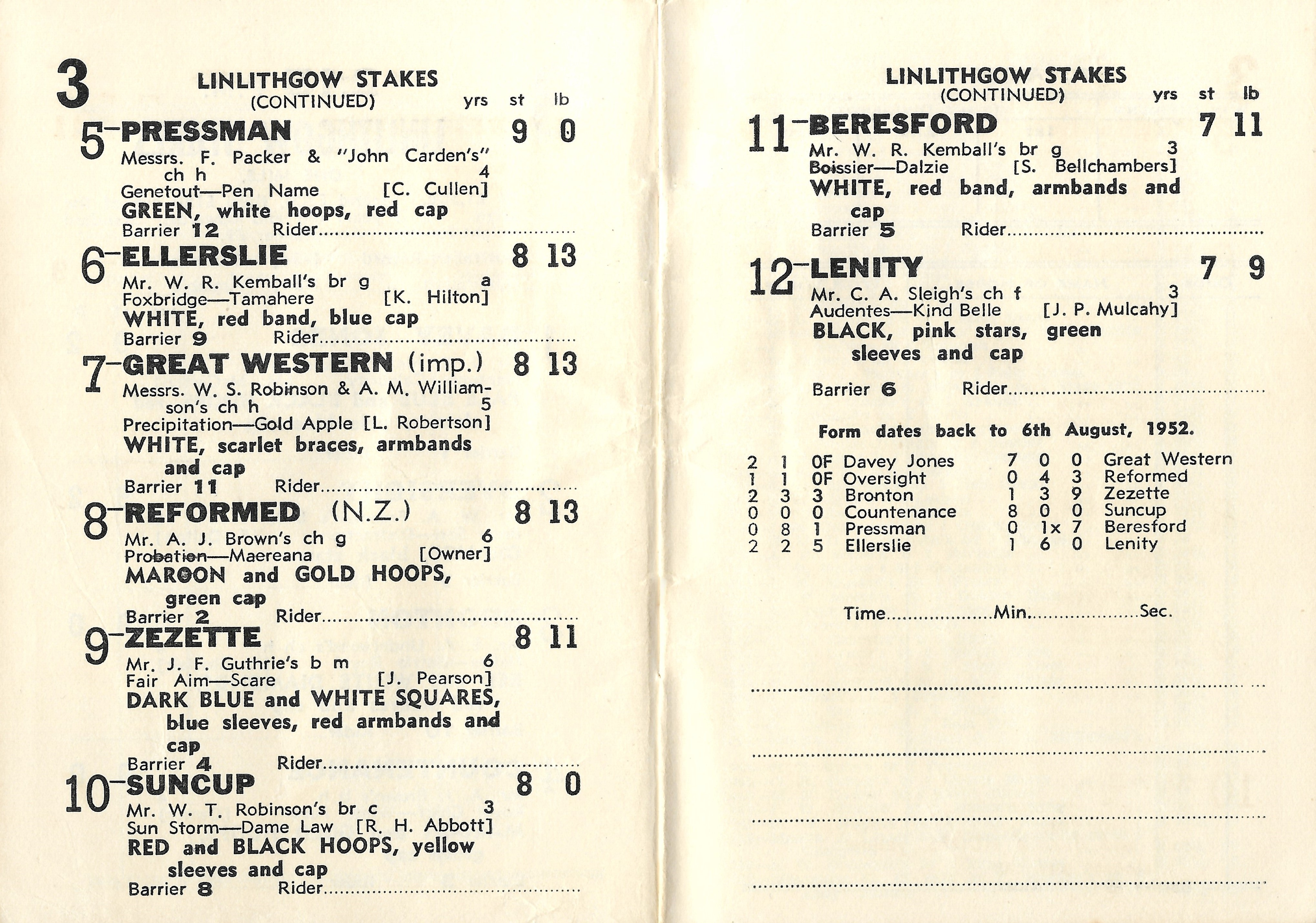
1952 VRC Linlithgow Stakes showing the winner, Ellerslie

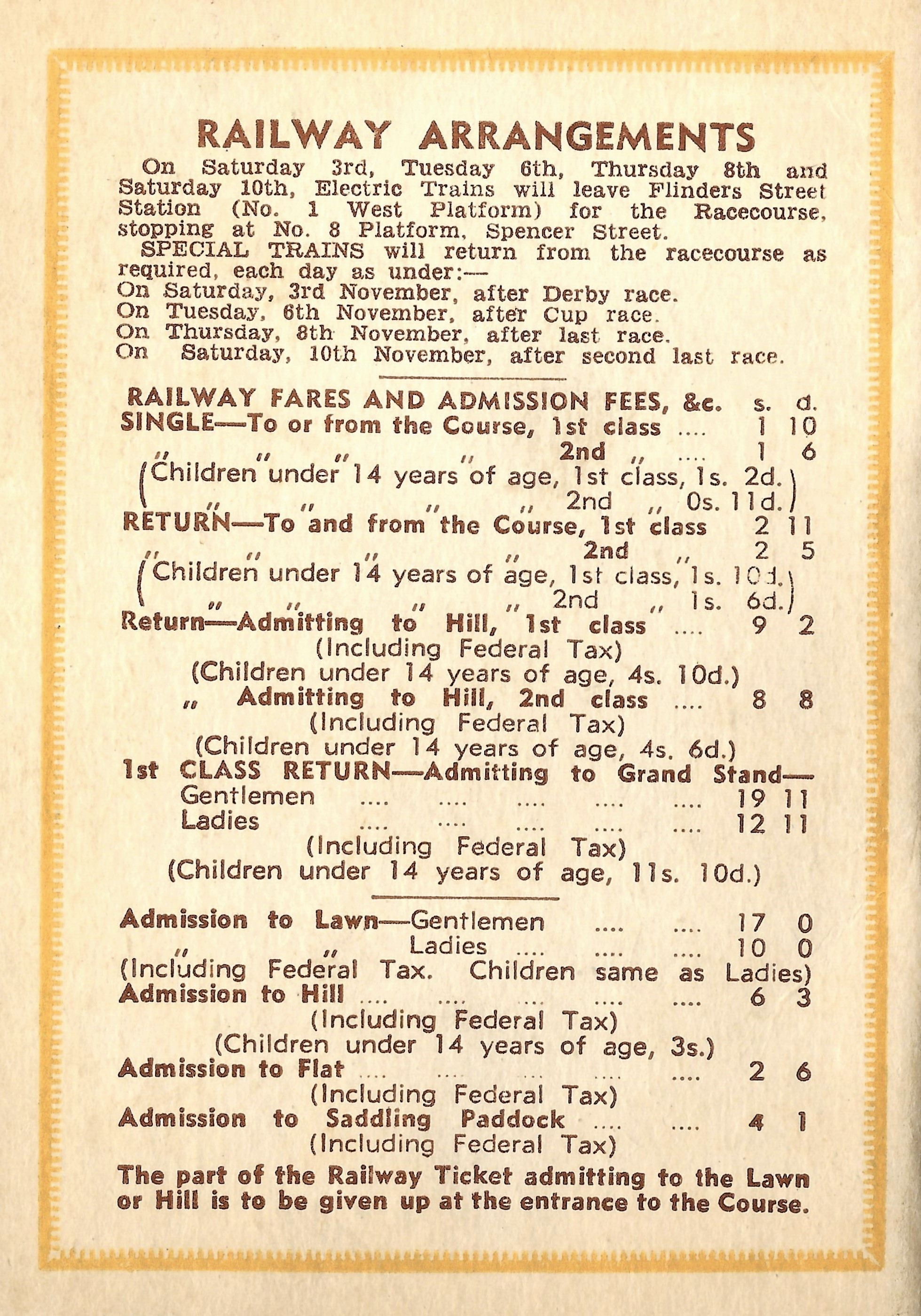
Back cover showing railway arrangements and charges at the entrance gates

=== Name ===
- 1868–1907 - Flying Stakes
- 1908–1996 - Linlithgow Stakes
- 1997–2003 - Emirates Classic
- 2004 - Lexus Classic
- 2005–2006 - The Age Classic
- 2007–2011 - Salinger Stakes
- 2012–2013 - Yellowglen Stakes
- 2014–2016 - tab.com.au Stakes
- 2017–2020 - TAB Stakes
- 2021–2022 - Linlithgow Stakes
- 2023 onwards - The Damien Oliver

=== Distance ===
- 1868–1886 - 6 furlongs (~1200 metres)
- 1887–1907 - 7 furlongs (~1400 metres)
- 1908–1967 - 1 mile (~1600 metres)
- 1968–1971 - 7 furlongs (~1400 metres)
- 1972–1991 – 1400 metres
- 1992–2021 – 1200 metres
- 2022 onwards - 1400 metres

=== Grade ===
- 1868–1978- Principal Race
- 1979 onwards - Group 2

== Winners ==
The following are past winners of the race.

- 2026 - Private Eye
- 2025 - Warnie
- 2024 - Another Wil
- 2023 - Cause For Concern
- 2022 - Old Flame
- 2021 - Justacanta
- 2020 - Kemalpasa
- 2019 - Kemalpasa
- 2018 - Osborne Bulls
- 2017 - Rich Charm
- 2016 - Illustrious Lad
- 2015 - Eclair Choice
- 2014 - Deep Field
- 2013 - Fontelina
- 2012 - Fontelina
- 2011 - Sister Madly
- 2010 - Whitefriars
- 2009 - Eagle Falls
- 2008 - Hot Danish
- 2007 - Swick
- 2006 - Magnus
- 2005 - Glamour Puss
- 2004 - Fastnet Rock
- 2003 - Our Egyptian Raine
- 2002 - Choisir
- 2001 - Belle Du Jour
- 2000 - Black Bean
- 1999 - Pharein
- 1998 - Toledo
- 1997 - Al Mansour
- 1996 - Mahogany
- 1995 - You Remember
- 1994 - Sequalo
- 1993 - Gold Brose
- 1992 - Tanjian Prince
- 1991 - Wrap Around
- 1990 - Redelva
- 1989 - Boardwalk Angel
- 1988 - Redelva
- 1987 - Placid Ark
- 1986 - Campaign King
- 1985 - Rass Flyer
- 1984 - Nouvelle Star
- 1983 - Keepers
- 1982 - Galleon
- 1981 - My Axeman
- 1980 - Prince Ruling
- 1979 - Tolhurst
- 1978 - Always Welcome
- 1977 - Blockbuster
- 1976 - Scamanda
- 1975 - Scamanda
- 1974 - Scamanda
- 1973 - All Shot
- 1972 - All Shot
- 1971 - Maritana
- 1970 - Our Faith
- 1969 - Vain
- 1968 - Regal Rhythm
- 1967 - Foresight
- 1966 - Legal Boy
- 1965 - Star Affair
- 1964 - Star Of Heaven
- 1963 - Wenona Girl
- 1962 - Sky High
- 1961 - Anonyme
- 1960 - Cadiz
- 1959 - Noholme
- 1958 - Wiggle
- 1957 - Matrice
- 1956 - Matrice
- 1955 - Somerset Fair
- 1954 - Prince Cortauld
- 1953 - Silver Phantom
- 1952 - Ellerslie
- 1951 - Iron Duke
- 1950 - Ellerslie
- 1949 - Dickens
- 1948 - Phoibos
- 1947 - Columnist
- 1946 - Attley
- 1945 - Royal Gem
- 1944 - race not held
- 1943 - race not held
- 1942 - race not held
- 1941 - High Caste
- 1940 - High Caste
- 1939 - † High Caste / Manrico
- 1938 - Ajax
- 1937 - Ajax
- 1936 - Young Idea
- 1935 - Valiant Chief
- 1934 - Closing Time
- 1933 - Chatham
- 1932 - Chatham
- 1931 - Chatham
- 1930 - Phar Lap
- 1929 - Amounis
- 1928 - Gothic
- 1927 - Amounis
- 1926 - Amounis
- 1925 - The Night Patrol
- 1924 - The Night Patrol
- 1923 - Maid Of The Mist
- 1922 - Violoncello
- 1921 - Sir Ibex
- 1920 - Greenstead
- 1919 - Cetigne
- 1918 - Wolaroi
- 1917 - Biplane
- 1916 - Wolaroi
- 1915 - Traquette
- 1914 - Mountain Knight
- 1913 - Andelosia
- 1912 - Mountain Princess
- 1911 - Popinjay
- 1910 - Beverage
- 1909 - Dhobi
- 1908 - Pink ‘Un
- 1907 - Mountain King
- 1906 - Iolaire
- 1905 - Gladsome
- 1904 - Gladsome
- 1903 - F.J.A.
- 1902 - Ibex
- 1901 - Sequence
- 1900 - Maltster
- 1899 - Kenley
- 1898 - The Grafter
- 1897 - Aurum
- 1896 - Hopscotch
- 1895 - Hova
- 1894 - Wallace
- 1893 - Loyalty
- 1892 - Bungebah
- 1891 - Trieste
- 1890 - Megaphone
- 1889 - Carbine
- 1888 - Carbine
- 1887 - Lady Betty
- 1886 - Hortense
- 1885 - Blairgowrie
- 1884 - Newstead
- 1883 - Brown and Rose
- 1882 - Kingsdale
- 1881 - Navigator
- 1880 - Welcome Jack
- 1879 - Remembrance
- 1878 - Sunshine
- 1877 - Bosworth
- 1876 - Savanaka
- 1875 - The Marquis Colt
- 1874 - Redwood
- 1873 - Atalanta
- 1872 - Barbelle
- 1871 - Barbelle
- 1870 - Barbelle
- 1869 - Coeur De Lion
- 1868 - Gulnare

† Dead heat

== See also ==
- Carbine Club Stakes (VRC)
- Coolmore Stud Stakes
- Empire Rose Stakes
- Begonia Belle Stakes
- Rising Fast Stakes (Chatham Stakes)
- The Vanity
- Victoria Derby
- Wakeful Stakes
- List of Australian Group races
- Group races
