= Violoncello (horse) =

Australian Thoroughbred racehorse

Violoncello (GB)
- Sire: Valens (GB)
- Grandsire: Laveno (GB)
- Dam: Catgut (GB)
- Damsire: Lactantius (GB)
- Sex: Stallion
- Foaled: 1916
- Colour: Chestnut
- Owner: Sir Samuel Hordern
- Trainer: C H Bryans
- Record: 37:10,3,2

Major wins
- Caulfield Cup (1921); W. S. Cox Plate (1922 ) Cantala Stakes (1922); Linlithgow Stakes (1922); C.B.Fisher Plate (1922)

Violoncello was a notable Australian Thoroughbred race horse.

Bred in England where he had raced six times for three wins, he was purchased as a seven-year-old for 4,000 guineas by Sir Samuel Hordern and sent to Australia. Grandsire Laveno (GB) won the 1895 Great Britain Champion Stakes and Jockey Club Stakes.

His half-brother, Quinologist had won the 1916 AJC Metropolitan Handicap which influenced Hordern to purchase him.

Violoncello won the 1921 Caulfield Cup and the inaugural running of the Cox Plate in 1922.

England Starts: 21 starts 5 wins, 1 second, 1 third

Australian Starts: 16 starts 5 wins, 2 seconds, 1 third
