= Chatham Stakes =

Horse race in Melbourne, Australia

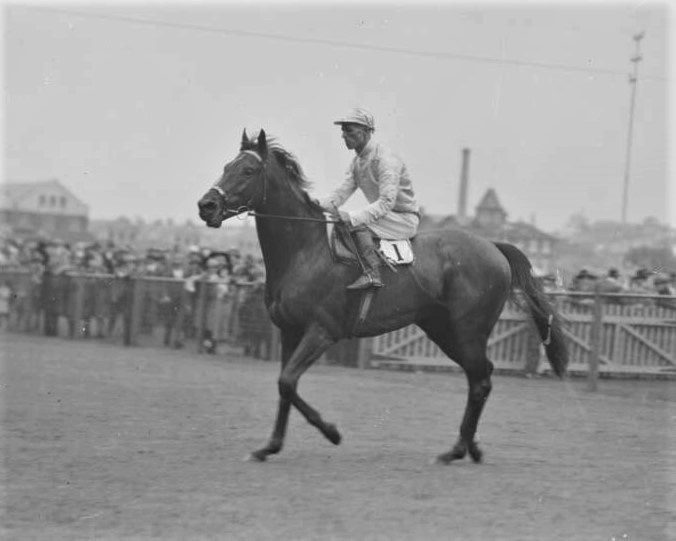
- Chatham and Jim Pike
- Class: Group 3
- Location: Flemington Racecourse, Melbourne, Australia
- Inaugurated: 1978
- Race type: Thoroughbred
- Sponsor: G.H. Mumm (2024-2026)

Race information
- Distance: 1,200 metres
- Surface: Turf
- Weight: Open handicap
- Purse: $240,000 (2026)

The Chatham Stakes is a registered Victoria Racing Club Group 3 Thoroughbred open handicap horse race raced as the Rising Fast Stakes, over a distance of 1200 metres held annually at Flemington Racecourse, Melbourne, Australia, during the VRC Spring Racing Carnival.

== History ==
The registered race is named after Australian Racing Hall of Fame and 1930s dual Cox Plate winner, Chatham.

The race has been run on the last day of the Flemington Carnival, Mackinnon Stakes day since 2018. Prior to 1997 the race was scheduled on Melbourne Cup Day. The race was then run on the first day of the Spring Carnival, Victoria Derby day between 1998 and 2015, before moving to Oaks Day between 2016 and 2017.

=== Name ===
Melbourne Cup Day

- 1978–1993 - The Great Western
- 1994–1996 - Royal Hong Kong Jockey Club Plate

Victoria Derby Day

- 1997–2005 - Yallambee Stud Stakes
- 2006 - Helvetica Stakes
- 2007 - Ellerston Capital Stakes
- 2008–2010 - AAMI Business Insurance Chatham Stakes
- 2011–2013 - tab.com.au Stakes
- 2014 - Yellowglen Stakes
- 2015 - Guvera Stakes

VRC Oaks Day

- 2016 - L'Oreal Stakes
- 2017 - TCL TV Stakes

LKS Mackinnon Stakes Day

- 2018 - DeRUCCI Chatham Stakes
- 2019–2020 - Network Ten Chatham Stakes
- 2021–current - Paramount+ Chatham Stakes
- 2022 onwards - Rising Fast Stakes

=== Grade ===
- 1978–1985 - Listed Race
- 1986 onwards - Group 3

=== Distance ===
- 1978–1985 - 1600 metres
- 1986–2021 - 1400 metres
- 2022 onwards - 1200 metres

== Winners ==
The following are the past winners of this race.

- 2026 - Ndola
- 2025 - Caballus
- 2024 - Maharba
- 2023 - Spacewalk
- 2022 - Argentia
- 2021 - Age Of Chivalry
- 2020 - Sansom
- 2019 - Reykjavik
- 2018 - Dreamforce
- 2017 - Hellova Street
- 2016 - Rageese
- 2015 - Disposition
- 2014 - Hucklebuck
- 2013 - Smokin' Joey
- 2012 - Fawkner
- 2011 - Woorim
- 2010 - Poor Judge
- 2009 - Centennial Park
- 2008 - All Silent
- 2007 - Count To Zero
- 2006 - Malcolm
- 2005 - Rockford Bay
- 2004 - Great Is Great
- 2003 - Scenic Park
- 2002 - To Be Fair
- 2001 - Scenic Park
- 2000 - Matter Of Honour
- 1999 - Black Bean
- 1998 - Bezeal Bay
- 1997 - Confiscate
- 1996 - Headstrong
- 1995 - Final Temp
- 1994 - New Smyrna
- 1993 - Cocky Beau
- 1992 - Let's Hurry
- 1991 - Blue Boss
- 1990 - Power Of Destiny
- 1989 - Swiftsynd
- 1988 - Bowie
- 1987 - Targlish
- 1986 - Avannotto
- 1985 - Beaumont Babe
- 1984 - La Caissiere
- 1983 - Vivacite
- 1982 - Pride Of Century
- 1981 - Lloyd's Race
- 1980 - Black Marque
- 1979 - Blue And White
- 1978 - Sarsha's Choice

== See also ==
- Carbine Club Stakes (VRC)
- Coolmore Stud Stakes
- The Damien Oliver
- Empire Rose Stakes
- Kirin Ichiban Sprint (Begonia Belle Stakes)
- The Vanity
- Victoria Derby
- Wakeful Stakes
- List of Australian Group races
- Group races
