= Coolmore Stud Stakes =

Horse race in Australia

Coolmore Stud Stakes registered as Ascot Vale Stakes
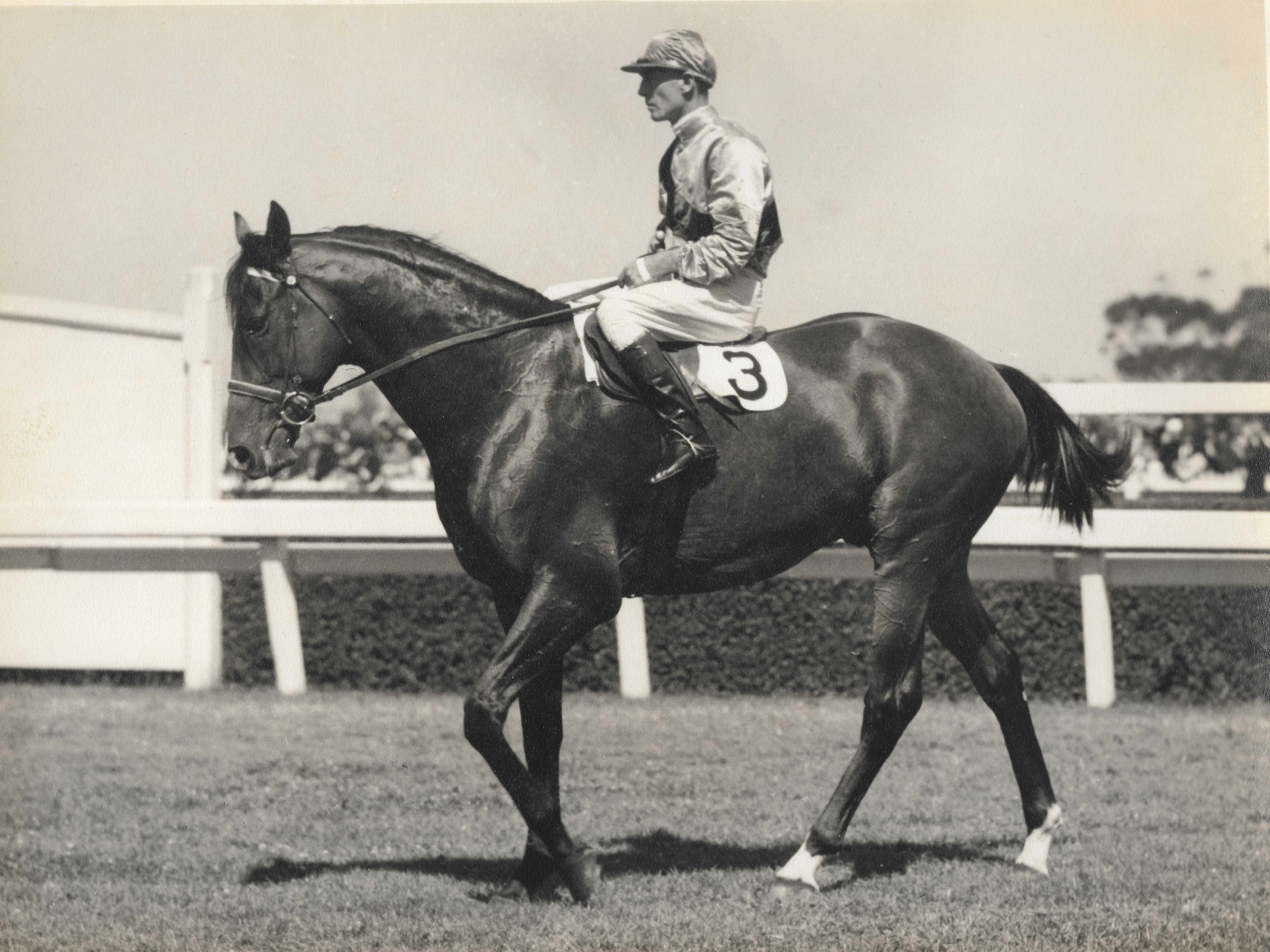
- High Caste, 1939 winner
- Class: Group 1
- Location: Flemington Racecourse
- Inaugurated: 1863 (as Ascot Vale Stakes)
- Race type: Thoroughbred
- Sponsor: Coolmore Stud (2007-2026)

Race information
- Distance: 1,200 metres
- Surface: Turf
- Qualification: Three-year-olds
- Weight: Set weights Colts & geldings: 57kg Fillies: 55kg
- Purse: $2,000,000 (2026)

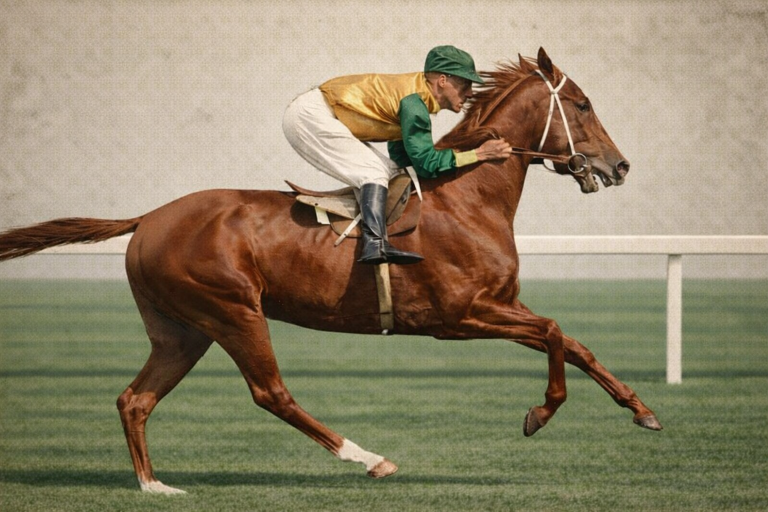
Heroic, 1924 winner

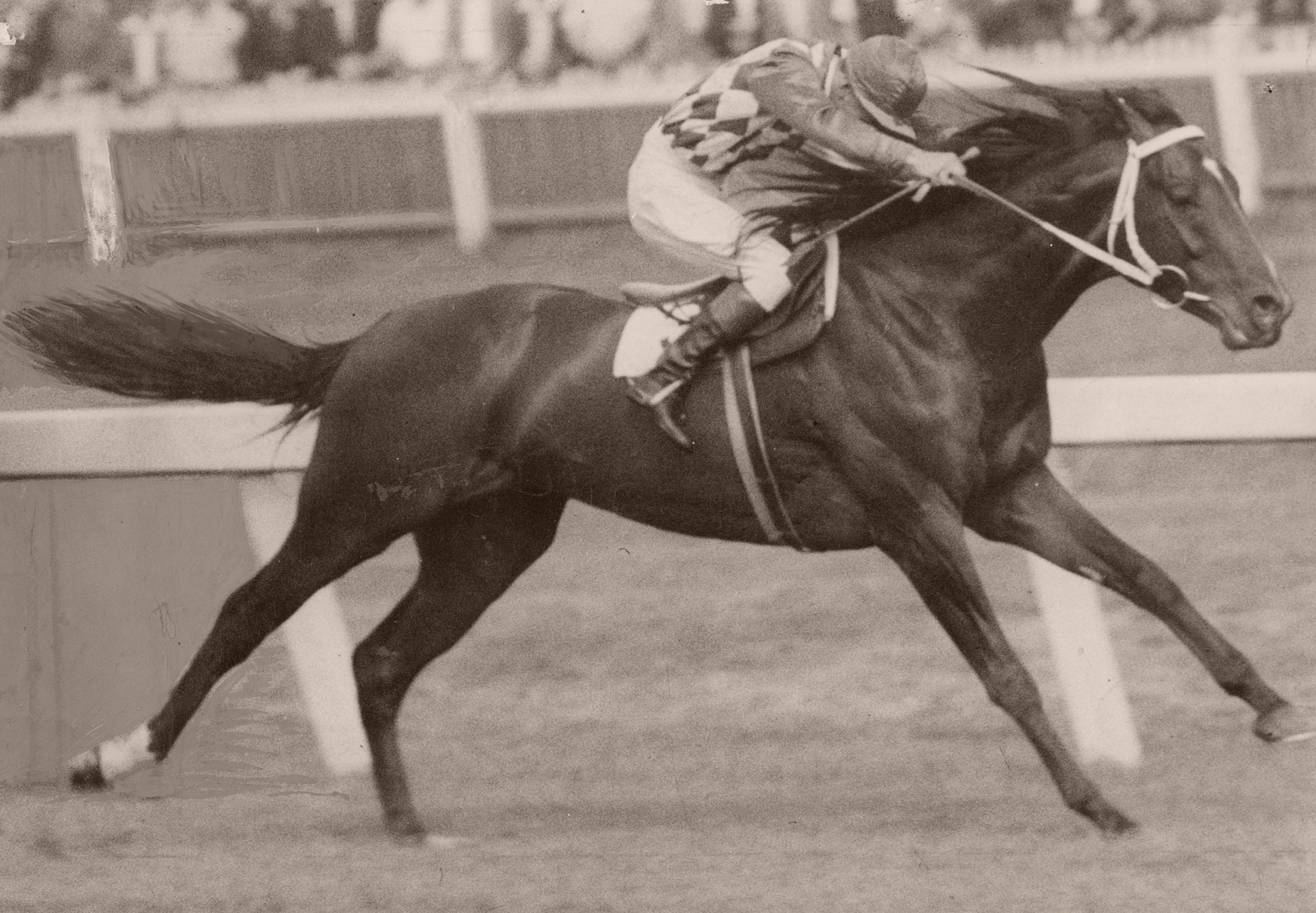
Comic Court, 1948 winner

The Coolmore Stud Stakes, registered as the Ascot Vale Stakes, is a Victoria Racing Club Group 1 Thoroughbred horse race for three-year-olds, at set weights, run over 1200 metres at Flemington Racecourse, Melbourne, Australia, on Victoria Derby Day.

== History ==
From its inception in 1863 until 1965 the race was for two-year-olds in the VRC Autumn Carnival, usually on Australian Cup day. The Victoria Racing Club removed the race from the calendar in 1966. It restored in 1969 to be run in the early spring meeting in September for three-year-olds; the champion Vain was the first winner.

In 2006 the VRC rescheduled the event by moving it to the first day of the VRC Spring Carnival, Victoria Derby day. The move included an upgrading of the event to Group 1 status with an increase in stakemoney. The similar event that was run on the first day of the VRC Spring Carnival was moved to September and was renamed as the Group 3 Danehill Stakes.

=== Distance ===
- 1863–1872 - 5 furlongs (~1000 metres)
- 1872–1972 - 6 furlongs (~1200 metres)
- 1972 onwards - 1200 metres
- except 1985 – 1170 metres

=== Grade ===
- 1932–1978 - Principal Race
- 1979–2005 - Group 2
- 2006 onwards - Group 1

=== 1948 racebook ===
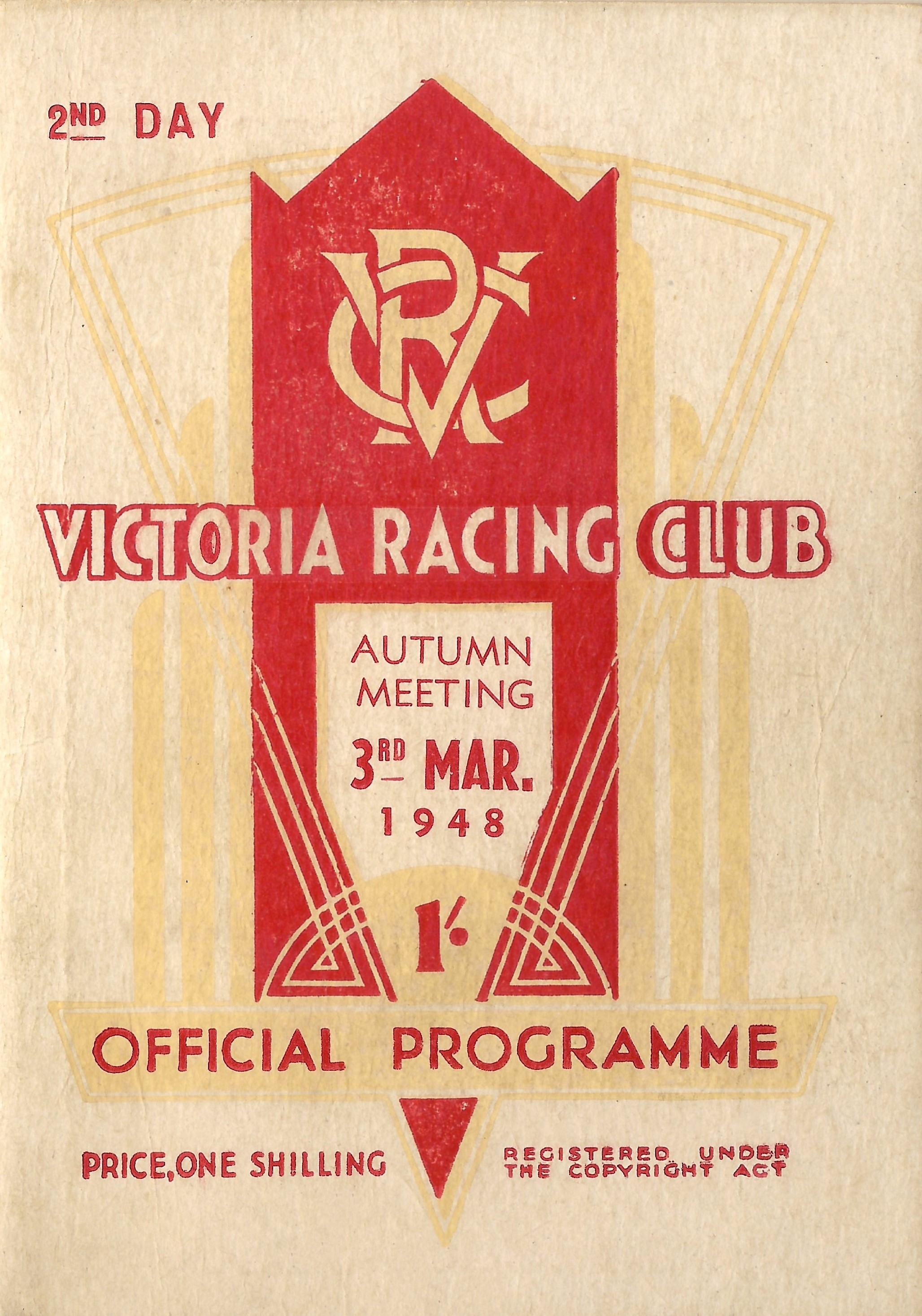
1948 VRC Ascot Vale Stakes racebook front cover

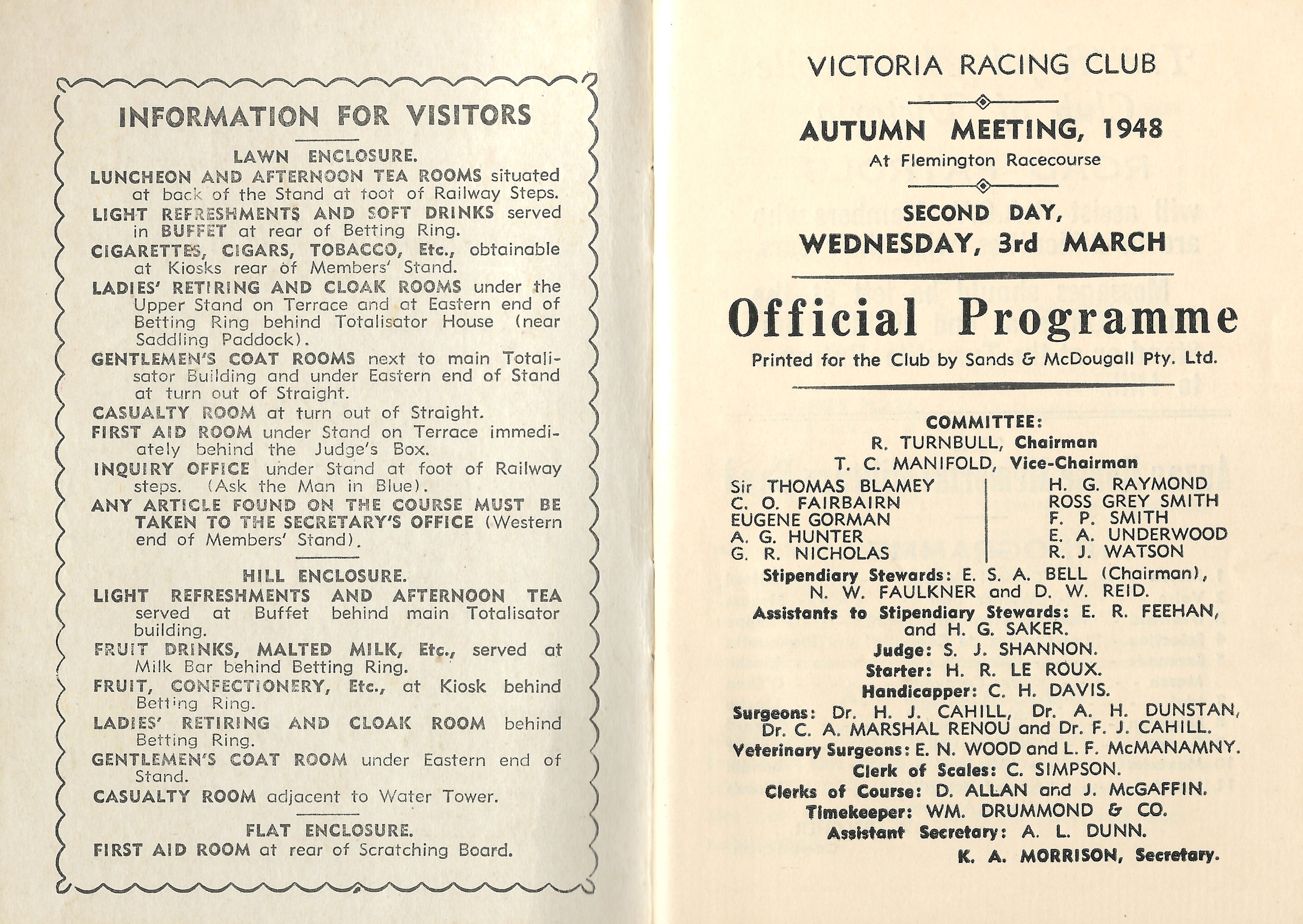
1948 VRC Ascot Vale Stakes raceday officials & enclosure notices

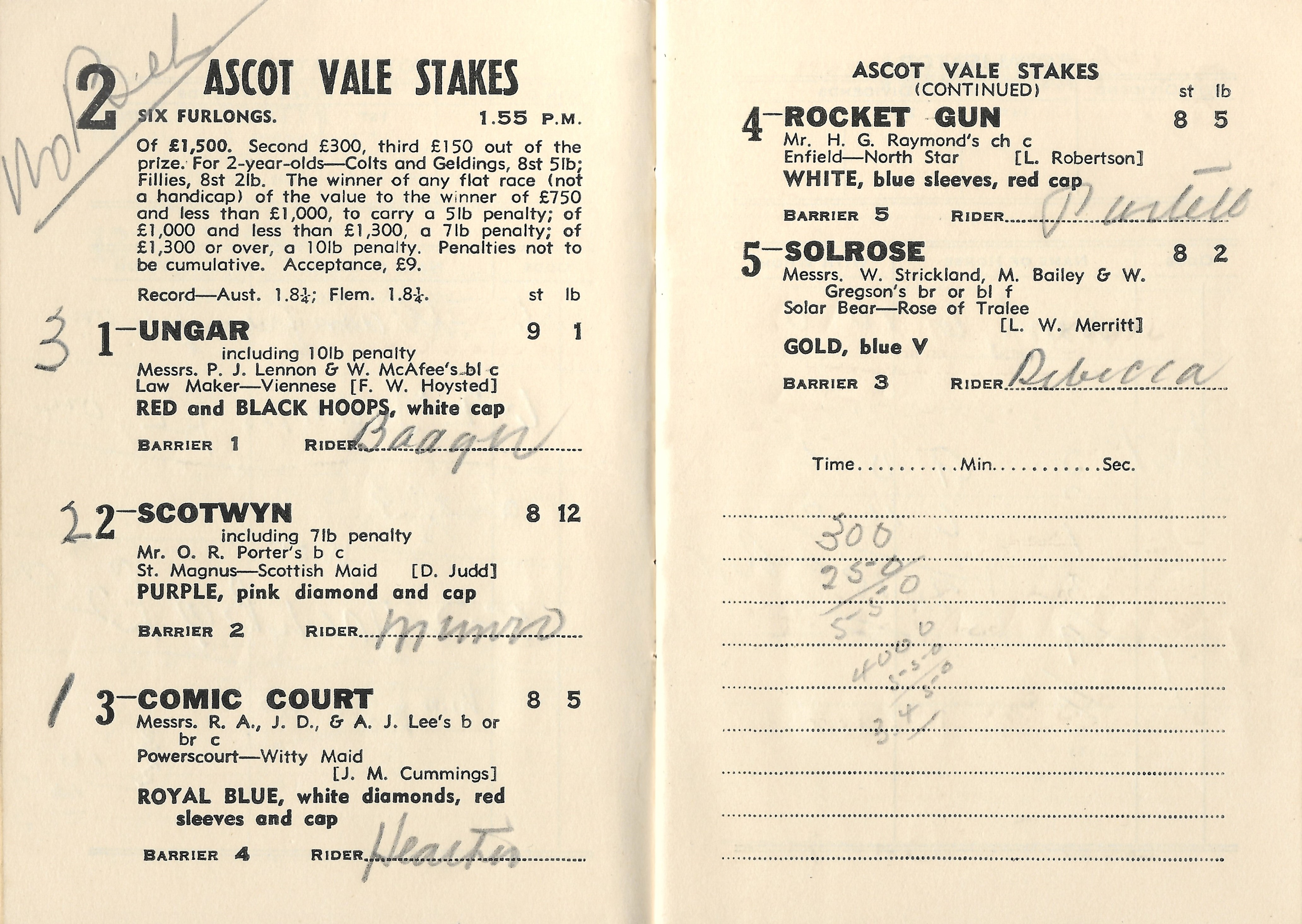
1948 VRC Ascot Vale Stakes showing the winner, Comic Court

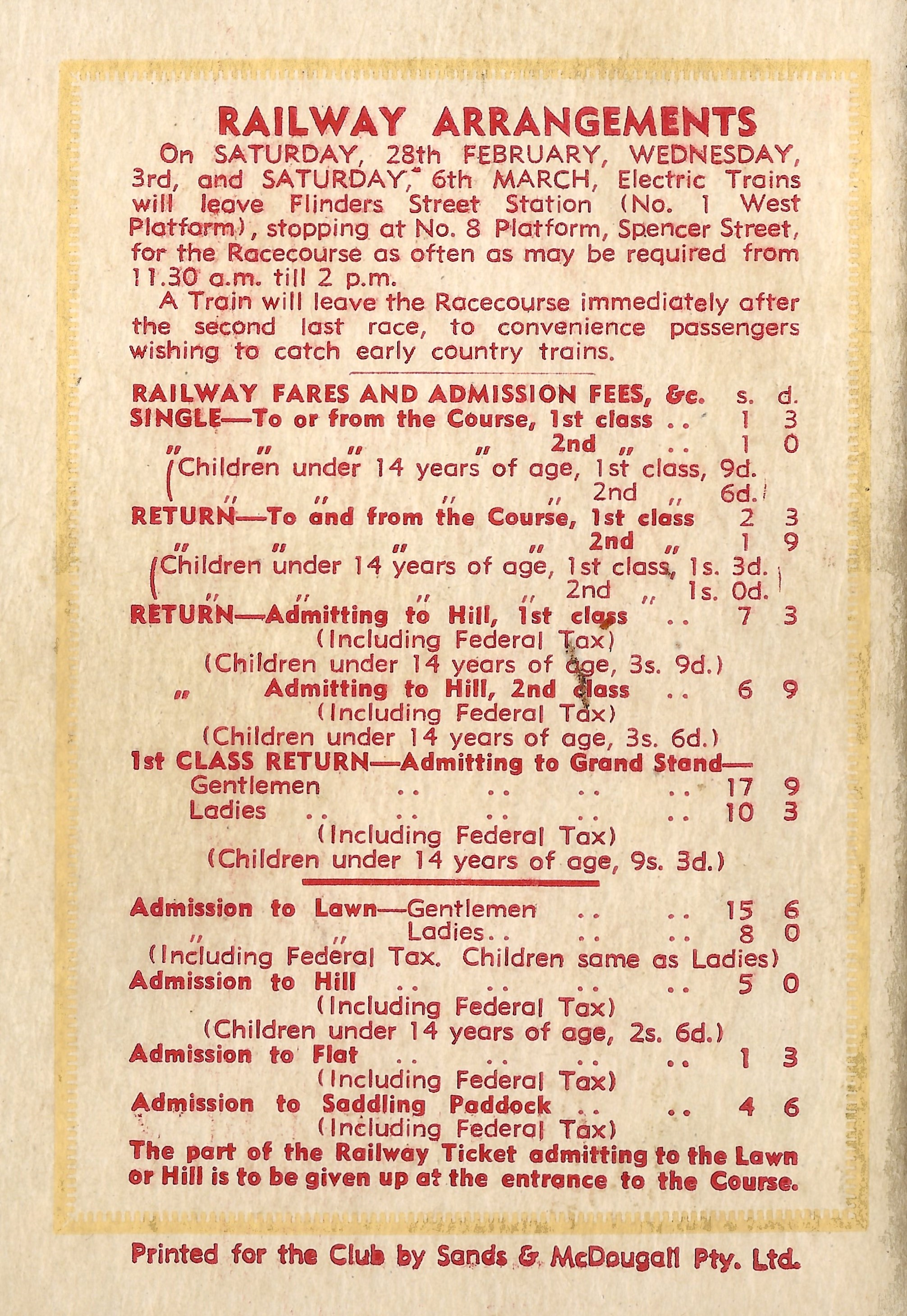
Back cover showing railway arrangements and admission fares

== Winners ==
The following are past winners of the race.

=== For three-year-olds (1969– ) ===
Held in September between 1969–2005. Since 2006 on the first day of the VRC Spring Carnival.

- 2026 - The Next Episode
- 2025 - Tentyris
- 2024 - Switzerland
- 2023 - Ozzmosis
- 2022 - In Secret
- 2021 - Home Affairs
- 2020 - September Run
- 2019 - Exceedance
- 2018 - Sunlight
- 2017 - Merchant Navy
- 2016 - Flying Artie
- 2015 - Japonisme
- 2014 - Brazen Beau
- 2013 - Zoustar
- 2012 - Nechita
- 2011 - Sepoy
- 2010 - Star Witness
- 2009 - Headway
- 2008 - Northern Meteor
- 2007 - Weekend Hussler
- 2006 - Gold Edition
- 2005 - Ferocity
- 2004 - Alinghi
- 2003 - Scaredee Cat
- 2002 - Innovation Girl
- 2001 - North Boy
- 2000 - So Gorgeous
- 1999 - Spargo
- 1998 - Theatre
- 1997 - Show No Emotion
- 1996 - Encosta De Lago
- 1995 - Our Maizcay
- 1994 - Racer's Edge
- 1993 - Brawny Spirit
- 1992 - Quegent
- 1991 - Tierce
- 1990 - Bureaucracy
- 1989 - Courtza
- 1988 - Zeditave
- 1987 - Kaapstad
- 1986 - Zephyr Cross
- 1985 - Campaign King
- 1984 - Royal Troubador
- 1983 - Top Post
- 1982 - Rancher
- 1981 - Rose Of Kingston
- 1980 - Sardius
- 1979 - Tolhurst
- 1978 - Manikato
- 1977 - Ballyred
- 1976 - Surround
- 1975 - Toy Show
- 1974 - Plush
- 1973 - Taj Rossi
- 1972 - Century
- 1971 - Tolerance
- 1970 - Eleazar
- 1969 - Vain

=== For two-year-olds (1863–1965) ===
The event was run in the autumn.

- 1965 - Star Affair
- 1964 - Thredbo
- 1963 - Munich
- 1962 - Royal Centaur
- 1961 - Blue Era
- 1960 - Reinsman
- 1959 - Travel Boy
- 1958 - Nilento
- 1957 - Ace High
- 1956 - Gay Sierra
- 1955 - Sir Newton
- 1954 - Acramitis
- 1953 - Yungawee
- 1952 - Lenity
- 1951 - Beau Silhouette
- 1950 - Flying Halo
- 1949 - St. Comedy
- 1948 - Comic Court
- 1947 - Filgaro
- 1946 - Chaperone
- 1945 - Royal Gem
- 1944 - Delina
- 1943 - Scottish Maid
- 1942 - Hesione
- 1941 - High Road
- 1940 - Industry
- 1939 - High Caste
- 1938 - Tactical
- 1937 - Caesar
- 1936 - Fidelity
- 1935 - Bimilla
- 1934 - Arachne
- 1933 - Shakuni
- 1932 - Powerscort
- 1931 - Auto Pay
- 1930 - Thurlstone
- 1929 - Spanish Galleon
- 1928 - Mollison
- 1927 - Royal Feast
- 1926 - Cyden
- 1925 - Los Gatos
- 1924 - Heroic
- 1923 - The Monk
- 1922 - Rosina
- 1921 - Isa
- 1920 - Midilli
- 1919 - Whiz Bang
- 1918 - Red Fox
- 1917 - Thrice
- 1916 - Deneb
- 1915 - Two
- 1914 - Woorak
- 1913 - Andelosia
- 1912 - Wolawa
- 1911 - Sconser
- 1910 - Beverage
- 1909 - Sunny South
- 1908 - The Brewer
- 1907 - Mazarin
- 1906 - Antonius
- 1905 - Charles Stuart
- 1904 - Koopan
- 1903 - Emir
- 1902 - Brakpan
- 1901 - Hautvilliers
- 1900 - Maltster
- 1899 - Condiment
- 1898 - Bobadil
- 1897 - Aurum
- 1896 - Newhaven
- 1895 - Challenger
- 1894 - Destiny
- 1893 - Projectile
- 1892 - Camoola
- 1891 - Penance
- 1890 - Titan
- 1889 - Spice
- 1888 - Volley
- 1887 - Hortense
- 1886 - Chesham
- 1885 - Uralla
- 1884 - Bargo
- 1883 - Archie
- 1882 - Navigator
- 1881 - Royal Maid
- 1880 - Grand Prix
- 1879 - Petrea
- 1878 - His Lordship
- 1877 - First King
- 1876 - Newminster
- 1875 - Maid Of All Work
- 1874 - Explosion
- 1873 - Lapidist
- 1872 - King Of The Ring
- 1871 - Beatrice
- 1870 - The Roe
- 1869 - Lamplighter
- 1867 - Fenella
- 1866 - Sour Grapes
- 1865 - Sea Gull
- 1864 - Lady Heron
- 1863 - Freestone

== See also ==
- Carbine Club Stakes (VRC)
- The Damien Oliver
- Empire Rose Stakes
- Begonia Belle Stakes
- Rising Fast Stakes (Chatham Stakes)
- The Vanity
- Victoria Derby
- Wakeful Stakes
- List of Australian Group races
- Group races
