= Carbine Club Stakes (VRC) =

- Class: Group 3
- Location: Flemington Racecourse
- Inaugurated: 1983 (Listed)
- Race type: Thoroughbred
- Sponsor: Channel 9 (2024-2026)

Race information
- Distance: 1,600 metres
- Surface: Turf
- Qualification: Three year old
- Weight: Set weights with penalties
- Purse: $500,000 (2026)

The Carbine Club Stakes is a Victoria Racing Club Group 3 Thoroughbred horse race for three-year-olds, at set weights with penalties, over a distance of 1600 metres. It is held annually at Flemington Racecourse in Melbourne, Australia, during the VRC Spring Racing Carnival.

== History ==
The race is named in honour of Carbine, a champion in the 19th century, winner of the Victoria Derby who made also a prolific impact in breeding of thoroughbreds in Australia and England.

The race is run on the first day of the VRC Spring Carnival, Victoria Derby day.

=== Grade ===
- 1983–1997 - Listed Race
- 1998 onwards - Group 3

== Winners ==
The following are past winners of the race.

- 2026 - The Roaring Sun
- 2025 - Panova
- 2024 - Aeliana
- 2023 - Kaizad
- 2022 - Perfect Thought
- 2021 - Fangirl
- 2020 - Crosshaven
- 2019 - Dalasan
- 2018 - Ranier
- 2017 - Levendi
- 2016 - Comin' Through
- 2015 - Mahuta
- 2014 - Kermadec
- 2013 - Paximadia
- 2012 - Lunar Rise
- 2011 - Galah
- 2010 - Mr Chard
- 2009 - Kidnapped
- 2008 - Dr Doute's
- 2007 - Zacroona
- 2006 - Permaiscuous
- 2005 - Testifiable
- 2004 - Al Maher
- 2003 - Sir Dex
- 2002 - Delago Brom
- 2001 - All Courage
- 2000 - Inspire
- 1999 - Over
- 1998 - Toy Carousel
- 1997 - Antiquity
- 1996 - Kailey Choice
- 1995 - Saintly
- 1994 - Perfect Harmony
- 1993 - Voting
- 1992 - Baskerville
- 1991 - Rapan Boy
- 1990 - Pre Record
- 1989 - Submariner
- 1988 - Wonder Dancer
- 1987 - Top Innings
- 1986 - Warned
- 1985 - Shankhill Lass
- 1984 - Brave Salute
- 1983 - Wage Freeze
- 1982 - Emancipation

== See also ==
- Coolmore Stud Stakes
- The Damien Oliver
- Empire Rose Stakes
- Kirin Ichiban Sprint (Begonia Belle Stakes)
- Rising Fast Stakes (Chatham Stakes)
- The Vanity
- Victoria Derby
- Wakeful Stakes
- List of Australian Group races
- Group races
