= The Vanity =

- Class: Group 3
- Location: Flemington Racecourse
- Race type: Thoroughbred
- Sponsor: TAB (2014-2026)

Race information
- Distance: 1,400 metres
- Surface: Turf
- Qualification: Three year old fillies
- Weight: Set weights with penalties
- Purse: $240,000 (2026)

The Vanity is a Victoria Racing Club Group 3 Thoroughbred horse race held under set weight conditions with penalties, for three-year-old fillies, over a distance of 1400 metres. It is held at Flemington Racecourse in Melbourne, Australia on VRC Derby Day.

== History ==
In 2024 the race was moved from Black Caviar Lightning Race Day to Victoria Derby Day.

=== Distance ===
- 1987–1989 – 1400 metres
- 1990 – 1200 metres
- 1991–1993 – 1400 metres
- 1994 – 1420 metres
- 1995 – 1432 metres
- 1996 – 1433 metres
- 1997–2006 – 1400 metres
- 2007 – 1200 metres
- 2008–2011 – 1400 metres
- 2012 – 1410 metres
- 2013 onwards - 1400 metres

=== Grade ===
- 1987–1999 - Listed race
- 2000 onwards - Group 3 race

=== Venue ===
- 1997 - Sandown Racecourse
- 2007 - Moonee Valley Racecourse

== Winners ==
The following are past winners of the race.

- 2026 - Regal Ambition
- 2025 - Sheza Alibi
- 2024 - Zeitung
- 2024 - Grinzinger Belle
- 2022 - Wollombi
- 2022 - Barb Raider
- 2021 – Zou Dancer
- 2020 – Bonvicini
- 2019 – Amphitrite
- 2018 – Rimraam
- 2017 – Kenedna
- 2016 – Don't Doubt Mamma
- 2015 – Sweet And Speedy
- 2014 – Solicit
- 2013 – Alzora
- 2012 – Shopaholic
- 2011 – Southern Speed
- 2010 – Tallow
- 2009 – Romneya
- 2008 – Musidora
- 2007 – Universal Queen
- 2006 – Pure Joy
- 2005 – Ballet Society
- 2004 – Country Lodge
- 2003 – Dextrous
- 2002 – Gold Lottey
- 2001 – Lan Kwai Fong
- 2000 – Forest Express
- 1999 – Rose O' War
- 1998 – Greeting
- 1997 – Akarana
- 1996 – Saleous
- 1995 – No Mischief
- 1994 – Balm In Gilead
- 1993 – Classy Twiggy
- 1992 – Northern Bisque
- 1991 – Irish Spree
- 1990 – Dancer's Choice
- 1989 – Very Droll
- 1988 – Tennessee Vain
- 1987 – Pseudonym Miss

== See also ==
- Carbine Club Stakes (VRC)
- Coolmore Stud Stakes
- The Damien Oliver
- Empire Rose Stakes
- Kirin Ichiban Sprint (Begonia Belle Stakes)
- Rising Fast Stakes (Chatham Stakes)
- Victoria Derby
- Wakeful Stakes
- List of Australian Group races
- Group races
