= Glamour Puss =

New Zealand-bred Thoroughbred racehorse

- Sire: Tale of the Cat
- Grandsire: Storm Cat
- Dam: Escada
- Damsire: Centaine
- Sex: Mare
- Foaled: 2000
- Died: 2016
- Country: New Zealand
- Colour: Bay
- Breeder: GJ Chittick (NZ)
- Owner: GJ Chittick (NZ)
- Trainer: Paul O'Sullivan; Danny O'Brien
- Record: 26: 9-4-4
- Earnings: A$1,246,821

Major wins
- Sapphire Stakes (2005); The Goodwood (2005); Salinger Stakes (2005); The Age Classic (2005)
- Last updated on 13 October 2017

Glamour Puss (foaled 5 October 2000 – 2016) was a New Zealand thoroughbred racemare who also raced in Australia. She was trained by Paul O'Sullivan in New Zealand and Danny O'Brien in Australia. Sired by Tale of the Cat to dam Centaine, she was the winner of two Group One races in 2005, including The Goodwood and Salinger Stakes.

Glamour Puss was retired in June 2006 to Waikato Stud in New Zealand after having competed in the Group Two King's Stand Stakes and the Group One Golden Jubilee Stakes at Royal Ascot Racecourse, having won nine races from twenty six race starts and in excess of A$1,200,000 in prize money.

In 2016 Glamour Puss was euthanised after complications following colic surgery. She was buried at New Zealand's Waikato Stud. Throughout her stud career she produced seven named foals, with all six foals to race being winners.
