= Amelia's Jewel =

Australian Thoroughbred racehorse

- Sire: Siyouni
- Dam: Bumbasina
- Damsire: Canford Cliffs
- Sex: Mare
- Foaled: 2019
- Country: Australia
- Colour: Bay
- Owner: Peter Walsh
- Trainer: Simon Miller/Annabel Neasham
- Jockey: Patrick Carbery/Damian Lane
- Record: 24:10-7-0
- Earnings: $4,124,800

Major wins
- Gimcrack Stakes (2022); Karrakatta Plate (2022); WA Guineas (2022); Northerly Stakes (2022); Roma Cup (2023); Let's Elope Stakes (2023); W H Stocks Stakes (2023); Guy Walter Stakes (2025)

Amelia's Jewel is a retired Australian Thoroughbred racehorse. Originally from Western Australia, she raced at the highest level for the entirety of her career, with all of her starts being in Group races or Listed races.

== Racing career ==
=== Early career ===
She was sired by the French racehorse Siyouni. In February 2022, Amelia's Jewel had her first trials at Belmont Park and the Lark Hill Thoroughbred Training Complex, ridden by Patrick Carbery. She is one of the few racehorses to make their debut in a Listed race, winning the Supremacy Stakes at Ascot Racecourse by over two lengths on 5 March 2022. Following two more dominant wins in the Group 3 Gimcrack Stakes and the Group 2 Karrakatta Plate, by a combined margin of over five lengths, she was rested for 29 weeks. Trainer Simon Miller then announced her intended return date to be at the Pinnacles Racing Carnival later that year.

She resumed racing with a victory in the Listed Belgravia Stakes on October 22, followed by her first career defeat two weeks later in the Burgess Queen Stakes on Melbourne Cup day, finishing second. On 3 December 2022, she recorded her biggest win with a victory in the newly established Group 1 Northerly Stakes. She was then rested for 17 weeks.

=== 2023 racing season ===
Amelia's Jewel resumed racing on 1 April in the Group 3 Roma Cup, winning by a length. With another Group win, the three-year-old filly was backed into favoritism for the first running of The Quokka two weeks later.

She started the race slowly, as she is known to do, dropping right back to last place before running on late at the 100-meter mark to draw level with leader Overpass in a photo finish, with the latter winning by a nose. Following her second defeat, she was once again rested, with trainer Simon Miller stating his intentions to target some of the bigger races in the eastern states, namely the Golden Eagle.

Following her spell and two trials, Amelia's Jewel was sent to Melbourne in September. Her first race in the new city was the Group 2 Let's Elope Stakes, where, ridden by Damian Lane, she faced quality opposition including Wrote To Arataki and Pride Of Jenni. In typical fashion she started slowly, settling last, before running on strongly to record another Group race victory. She would win the Group 2 W H Stocks Stakes at Moonee Valley Racecourse two weeks later, beating Pride Of Jenni again and breaking the 1600m track record at Moonee Valley.

Her next start was in the Group 1 Toorak Handicap at Caulfield Racecourse, starting as the short-priced favorite. In her at-the-time worst career start, she finished ninth and was subsequently ruled out of a run in the Cox Plate. Amelia's next race was in the $10,000,000 Golden Eagle at Rosehill Gardens Racecourse, starting as the favorite. After starting the race well, settling midfield, she was checked by two other horses whilst passing the 300m mark, losing several lengths and causing jockey Damian Lane to almost fall from his saddle. She finished 11th in what was her last race of the year, with Lane saying of the ride "[I'm] glad I came back in the jockey’s room alive." She was awarded the Racehorse of the Year title at the WA Thoroughbred Racing Awards in August.

=== Late career ===
In January 2024, owner Peter Walsh announced Amelia's Jewel would be permanently relocated to Sydney and trained by Annabel Neasham.

Despite some promising performances throughout the year, Amelia's Jewel failed to win a race in 2024 from her eight starts, finishing runner-up on five occasions and going unplaced three times. On 1 March 2025, she recorded her first victory in almost two years, a win in the Guy Walter Stakes, and in atypical fashion led for the entirety of the race. She was retired in April 2025, following a fifth-place finish in the Queen of the Turf Stakes.

== Racing style ==
Amelia's Jewel had a distinctive racing style, often settling at the back of the field in the early stages of a race, before producing strong finishes with a "devastating turn of foot".

== Breeding ==
Following her retirement, Amelia's Jewel was sold for A$3.8 million at the Inglis Chairman's Sale on 8 May 2025. She was purchased by Tom Magnier of Coolmore Stud and was the second most expensive mare sold at the sale, behind former Quokka opponent Bella Nipotina (A$4.2 million). Shortly after the sale, it was announced that she was expected to be sent to Kentucky to breed with the Triple Crown-winning stallion Justify. However, she was instead sent to Coolmore's Hunter Valley farm in New South Wales to breed with the late Wootton Bassett.

== Race record ==
2021-22 season
Result	Date	Race	Venue	Group	Distance	Weight (kg)	Jockey	Winner/2nd
Won	5 Mar 2022	Supremacy Stakes	Ascot	Listed	1000 m	54	P. Carbery	2nd - Fiorucci Mama
Won	19 Mar 2022	Gimcrack Stakes	Ascot	Group 3	1100 m	56.5	P. Carbery	2nd - Costume Party
Won	2 Apr 2022	Karrakatta Plate	Ascot	Group 2	1200 m	54.5	P. Carbery	2nd - Baby Paris

2022-23 season
Result	Date	Race	Venue	Group	Distance	Weight (kg)	Jockey	Winner/2nd
Won	22 Oct 2022	Belgravia Stakes	Ascot	Listed	1200 m	57	P. Carbery	2nd - Man Crush
2nd	1 Nov 2022	Burgess Queen Stakes	Ascot	Listed	1400 m	58	P. Carbery	1st - Laced Up Heels
Won	19 Nov 2022	WA Guineas	Ascot	Group 2	1600 m	54.5	P. Carbery	2nd - Bustler
Won	3 Dec 2022	Northerly Stakes	Ascot	Group 1	1800 m	50	P. Carbery	2nd - Ironclad
Won	1 Apr 2023	Roma Cup	Ascot	Group 3	1100 m	54.5	P. Carbery	2nd - Red Can Man
2nd	15 Apr 2023	The Quokka	Ascot	Special Conditions	1200 m	54.5	P. Carbery	1st - Overpass

2023-24 season
Result	Date	Race	Venue	Group	Distance	Weight (kg)	Jockey	Winner/2nd
Won	16 Sep 2023	Let's Elope Stakes	Flemington	Group 2	1400 m	58.5	D. Lane	2nd - Life Lessons
Won	29 Sep 2023	W H Stocks Stakes	The Valley	Group 2	1600 m	56.5	D. Lane	2nd - Pride Of Jenni
9th	14 Oct 2023	Toorak Handicap	Caulfield	Group 1	1600 m	56	D. Lane	1st - Attrition
11th	4 Nov 2023	Golden Eagle	Rosehill	Group 1	1500 m	55.5	D. Lane	1st - Obamburumai
2nd	6 Apr 2024	Roma Cup	Ascot	Group 3	1100 m	56.5	P. Carbery	1st - Oscar's Fortune
2nd	20 Apr 2024	The Quokka	Ascot	Special Conditions	1200 m	56.5	D. Lane	1st - Overpass
12th	11 May 2024	The Goodwood	Morphettville	Group 1	1200 m	56.5	D. Lane	1st - Benedetta

2024-25 season
Result	Date	Race	Venue	Group	Distance	Weight (kg)	Jockey	Winner/2nd
2nd	7 Sep 2024	Tramway Stakes	Randwick	Group 2	1400 m	56	T. Berry	1st - Royal Patronage
2nd	28 Sep 2024	Golden Pendant	Rosehill	Group 2	1400 m	58	T. Berry	1st - Makarena
5th	19 Oct 2024	King Charles III Stakes	Randwick	Group 1	1600 m	57	T. Berry	1st - Ceolwulf
2nd	2 Nov 2024	Empire Rose Stakes	Flemington	Group 1	1600 m	57	J. Melham	1st - Atishu
5th	9 Nov 2024	Champions Mile	Flemington	Group 1	1600 m	57	D. Lane	1st - Mr Brightside
Won	1 Mar 2025	Guy Walter Stakes	Randwick	Group 2	1400 m	57	J. McDonald	2nd - Ausbred Flirt
6th	15 Mar 2025	Coolmore Classic	Rosehill	Group 1	1500 m	58	J. Parr	1st - Lady Shenandoah
5th	12 Apr 2025	Queen Of The Turf Stakes	Rosehill	Group 1	1600 m	57	J. Parr	1st - Fangirl
