= Gimcrack Stakes (disambiguation) =

The Gimcrack Stakes is a horse race run at York Racecourse in England.

The title can also refer to the following horse races:

- Gimcrack Stakes (ATC), an Australian Turf Club horse race run at Randwick Racecourse in New South Wales, Australia
- Gimcrack Stakes (PR), a Perth Racing horse race run at Ascot Racecourse in Western Australia, Australia
