= Northam Stakes =

- Class: Group 3
- Location: Northam Racecourse, Northam, Western Australia
- Inaugurated: 2007
- Race type: Thoroughbred
- Sponsor: Tabtouch (2023-26)

Race information
- Distance: 1,300 metres
- Surface: Turf
- Qualification: Three year old and older
- Weight: Set weights with Penalties
- Purse: $200,000 (2026)

The Northam Stakes is a Northam Racing Club Group 3 Thoroughbred horse race held under Set weights with penalties conditions for three-year-olds and older, over a distance of 1300 metres at Northam Racecourse, Northam, Western Australia, Australia in May.

== History ==
The race was titled the Northam Sprint from its inception in 2007 until 2012 when it was renamed the Northam Stakes.

=== Grade ===
- 2012–2017 - Listed Race
- 2018 - Group 3

=== Distance ===
- 2007–2008 - 1300 metres
- 2009–2022 - 1100 metres
- 2023 onwards - 1300 metres

=== Venue ===
- 2020 - Ascot Racecourse

== Winners ==
The following are past winners of the race.

- 2026 - Smooth Chino
- 2025 - West Star
- 2024 - Western Empire
- 2023 - Dom To Shoot
- 2022 - Elite Street
- 2021 – Cup Night
- 2020 – Fabergino
- 2019 – Rock Magic
- 2018 – Battle Hero
- 2017 – First Among Equals
- 2016 – Magnifisio
- 2015 – Dawn Approach
- 2014 – Magnifisio
- 2013 – Beach Express
- 2012 – Barakey
- 2011 – Power Princess
- 2010 – Kid Choisir
- 2009 – Vain Raider
- 2008 – Money Exchange
- 2007 – Certain Gold

== See also ==
- Roma Cup
- Winterbottom Stakes
- List of Australian Group races
- Group races
