= WA Oaks =

Horse race held in Perth, Western Australia

Western Australian Oaks
- Class: Group 3
- Location: Ascot Racecourse, Perth, Western Australia
- Inaugurated: 1953
- Race type: Thoroughbred
- Sponsor: Drummond Golf (2024-2026)

Race information
- Distance: 2,400 metres
- Surface: Turf
- Qualification: Three year old fillies
- Weight: Set weights - 55½ kg
- Purse: $300,000 (2026)

The Western Australian Oaks is a Perth Racing Group 3 Thoroughbred horse race for three-year-old fillies at set weights run over 2400 metres, held at Ascot Racecourse in Perth, Western Australia each year in April.

== History ==
=== Grade ===
- 1953–1978 - Principal Race
- 1979–1991 - Group 1
- 1992–2006 - Group 2
- 2006 onwards - Group 3

=== Distance ===
- 1953–1971 - 1 1/2 miles (~2400 metres)
- In 1983 and 2005 the distance of the race was 2182 metres.

=== Venue ===
- In 1983 and 2005 the race was run at Belmont Park Racecourse.

=== Recent multiple winners ===
Jockeys

- Paul Harvey in 2000, 2003 and 2004.
- Shaun O'Donnell in 2010, 2014 and 2025
- Chris Parnham in 2017, 2018, 2019 and 2023.
- William Pike in 2007, 2008, 2011, 2015 and 2020.
- Troy Turner in 2012, 2013 and 2024.

Trainers

- Grant Williams in 2011, 2015 and 2016 and also with Alana Williams in 2017, 2018, 2019 and 2020.

== Winners ==
The following are past winners of the race.

- 2026 - Wonderfully Made
- 2025 - Machine Gun Gracie
- 2024 - Own The Queen
- 2023 - She's Fit
- 2022 - Lady Chant
- 2021 - Lunar Impact
- 2020 - Tuscan Queen
- 2019 - Dark Choice
- 2018 - Special Alert
- 2017 - Very Tempting
- 2016 - First Impressions
- 2015 - Delicacy
- 2014 - Balmont Girl
- 2013 - Moreish
- 2012 - Pop Culture
- 2011 - Dreamaway
- 2010 - Impressive Jeuney
- 2009 - Cassandara Shadow
- 2008 - Grand Journey
- 2007 - Westerly Breeze
- 2006 - Moodometer
- 2005 - Royal Drive
- 2004 - Fatal Attraction
- 2003 - Superior Star
- 2002 - Honor Lap
- 2001 - ¶Race not held
- 2000 - Old Money
- 1999 - Reflected Image
- 1998 - Matriculate
- 1997 - Mystic Chantry
- 1996 - Fabulous
- 1995 - Unpretentious
- 1994 - Beaux Art
- 1993 - Leeuwin Concert
- 1992 - Jevresa
- 1991 - India's Dream
- 1990 - Natasha
- 1989 - Hasty Departure
- 1988 - Trappings
- 1987 - Judyann
- 1986 (Nov.) - Send Me An Angel
- 1986 (Apr.) - †Cologne
- 1985 - Contwig
- 1984 - True Devotion
- 1983 - Lowanna Rose
- 1982 - Magic Gauntlet
- 1981 - Badinage
- 1980 - Queen Inca
- 1979 - ‡Gay Affair / Brechin Castle
- 1978 - Autumn Talk
- 1977 - Adaptable
- 1976 - Lovely Curves
- 1975 - Vatilla
- 1974 - Our Pocket
- 1973 - Paper Honey
- 1972 - Maple Twig
- 1971 - Sovereignito
- 1970 - Star Supreme
- 1969 - Baywana
- 1968 - Painted Rose
- 1967 - Kaytello
- 1966 - Muette
- 1965 - Carol's Choice
- 1964 - Sweet Saga
- 1963 - Swell Baby
- 1962 - Activity
- 1961 - Blue Rose
- 1960 - Queen Of The Nile
- 1959 - Lalisse
- 1958 - Cheeky Jan
- 1957 - Fairflow
- 1956 - Dawdie
- 1955 - Craghill
- 1954 - Finesta
- 1953 - Copper Beech

¶ Race moved in racing calendar forward to autumn of 2002
† Race was run twice in 1986 since it was moved in the racing calendar from autumn (April) to spring (late November)
‡ Dead heat

== See also ==
- Gimcrack Stakes (PR)
- Roma Cup
- WA Champion Fillies Stakes
- WA Guineas
- WATC Derby
- List of Australian Group races
- Group races
