= Colonel Reeves Stakes =

Horse race in Perth, Western Australia

- Class: Group 3
- Location: Ascot Racecourse, Perth, Western Australia
- Inaugurated: 1984
- Race type: Thoroughbred
- Sponsor: A Class Earthmoving (2026)

Race information
- Distance: 1,100 metres
- Surface: Turf
- Track: Left-handed
- Qualification: Three year old and older
- Weight: Quality handicap
- Purse: A$200,000 (2026)

The Colonel Reeves Stakes is a Perth Racing Group 3 Thoroughbred horse race held under quality handicap conditions, for horses aged three years old and upwards, over a distance of 1100 metres at Ascot Racecourse, Perth, Western Australia in November.

== History ==
- The race is named in honour of Colonel Reeves, who convened the first meeting of The Western Australian Turf Club on 22 October 1852.
- In 2003 the race was run at Belmont Park Racecourse.

=== Grade ===
- 1987–2004 - Listed race
- 2005 onwards - Group 3

=== Distance ===
- 1987–2008 – 1200 metres
- 2009 onwards - 1100 metres

=== Name ===
- 2001–2002 - Channel Nine Stakes

== Winners ==
The following are past winners of the race.

- 2026 - Oscar's Fortune
- 2025 - Jokers Grin
- 2024 - Rope Them In
- 2023 - Hot Zed
- 2022 - This'll Testya
- 2021 - Elite Street
- 2020 - Celebrity Queen
- 2019 - Flirtini
- 2018 - Durendal
- 2017 - State Solicitor
- 2016 - Vega Magic
- 2015 - Rock Magic
- 2014 - Shining Knight
- 2013 - The Rising
- 2012 - Barakey
- 2011 - Avante
- 2010 - Ma Ma Machine
- 2009 - Revolition
- 2008 - Danny Beau
- 2007 - So Secret
- 2006 - Electric General
- 2005 - Ellicorsam
- 2004 - Avenida Madero
- 2003 - Golden Delicious
- 2002 - Secret Remedy
- 2001 - Lady Belvedere
- 2000 - Highwood
- 1999 - † Zedavite / Terwilliger
- 1998 - Scouts Honour
- 1997 - On A Swing
- 1996 - Legerman
- 1995 - race not held
- 1994 - ‡ Tolo Harbour (December)
- 1994 - ‡ Sheer Grey (January)
- 1993 - race not held
- 1992 - Business Beat
- 1991 - † M'Lady's Jewel / Richmond Boy
- 1990 - Bovader
- 1989 - Ossie Pak
- 1988 - Heron Bridge
- 1987 - Track Jester
- 1986 - Miss Symphony
- 1985 - Jemoyn
- 1984 - Heron Bridge

† Run in Divisions
‡ Note: 2 races in 1994 - January and December (Scheduling change for 1994–95 season)

== See also ==
- R J Peters Stakes
- WA Champion Fillies Stakes
- List of Australian Group races
- Group races
