= R J Peters Stakes =

Horse race in Perth, Western Australia

- Class: Group 3
- Location: Ascot Racecourse, Perth, Western Australia
- Inaugurated: 1905 (as WA Plate)
- Race type: Thoroughbred

Race information
- Distance: 1,500 metres
- Surface: Turf
- Track: Left-handed
- Qualification: Three years old and older
- Weight: Quality handicap
- Purse: A$200,000 (2026)

The R J Peters Stakes is a Perth Racing Group 3 Thoroughbred horse race held under quality handicap conditions, for horses aged three years old and upwards, over a distance of 1500 metres at Ascot Racecourse, Perth, Western Australia in November.

== History ==
- The race was not held during World War II.
- In 2003 the race was run over 1600 metres at Belmont Park Racecourse.
- The race is named in honour of Bob Peters, one of Western Australia’s leading owner-breeders of thoroughbred racehorses.

=== 1953 racebook ===
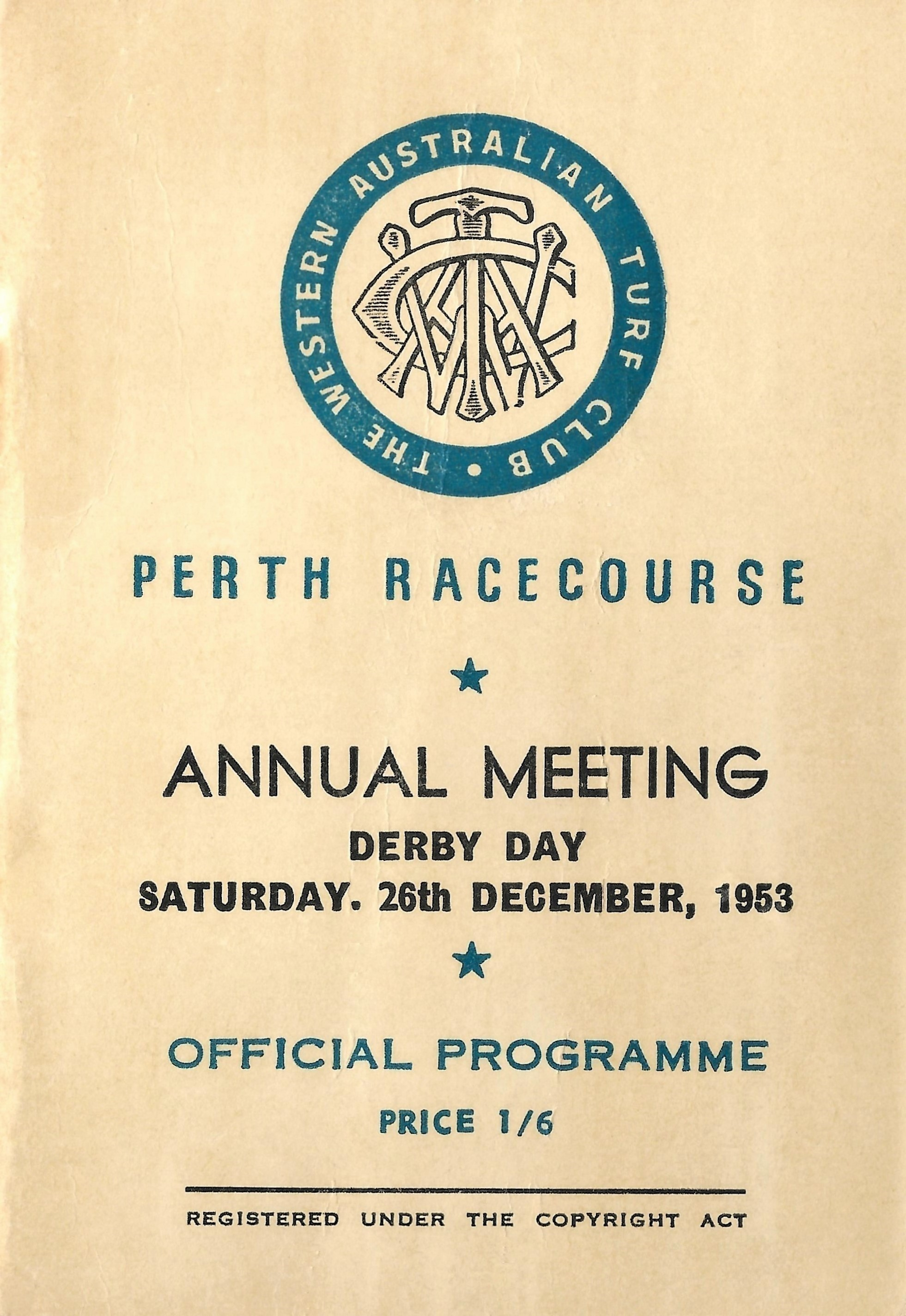
1953 WATC Derby racebook front cover

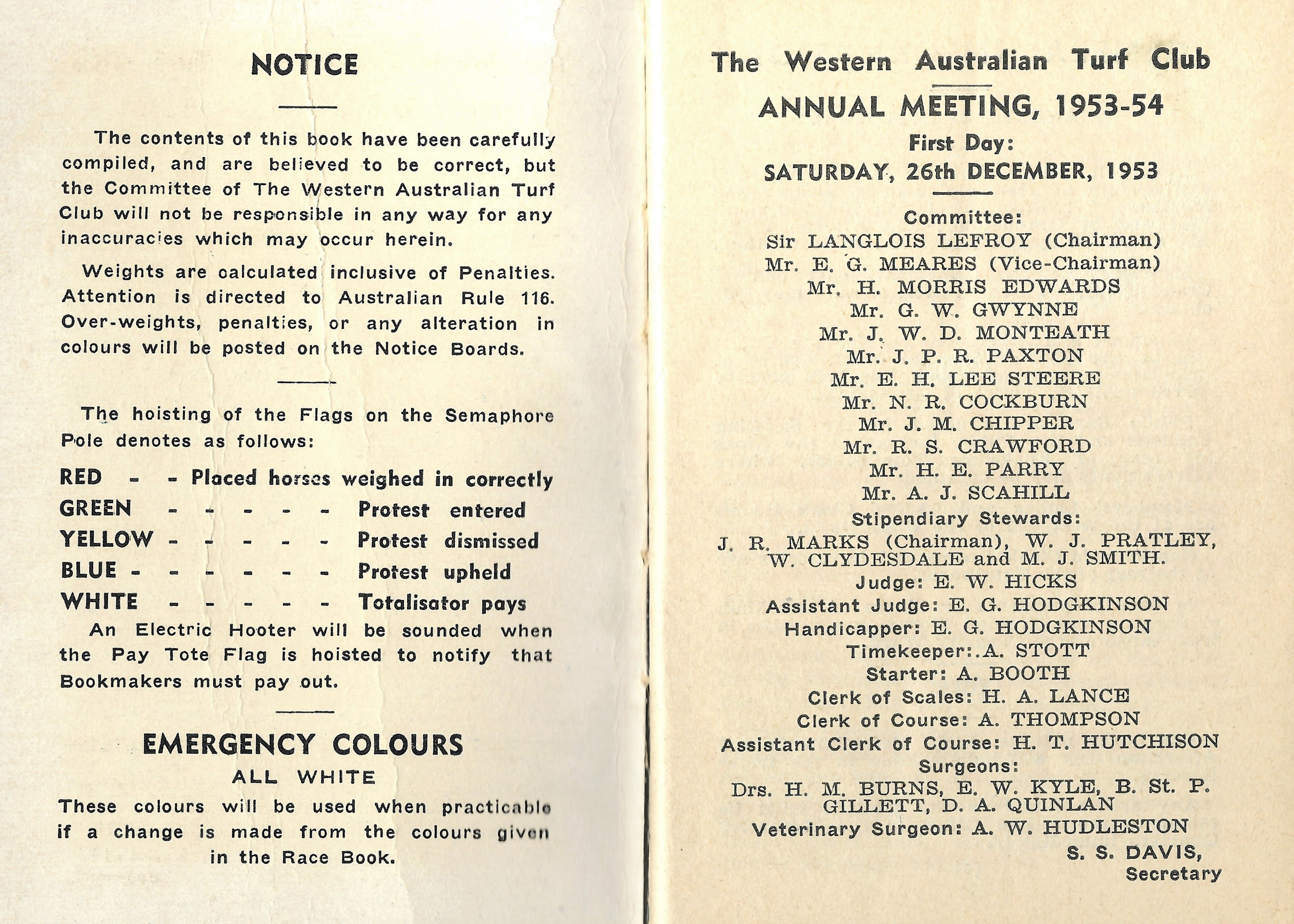
1953 WATC Derby showing raceday officials

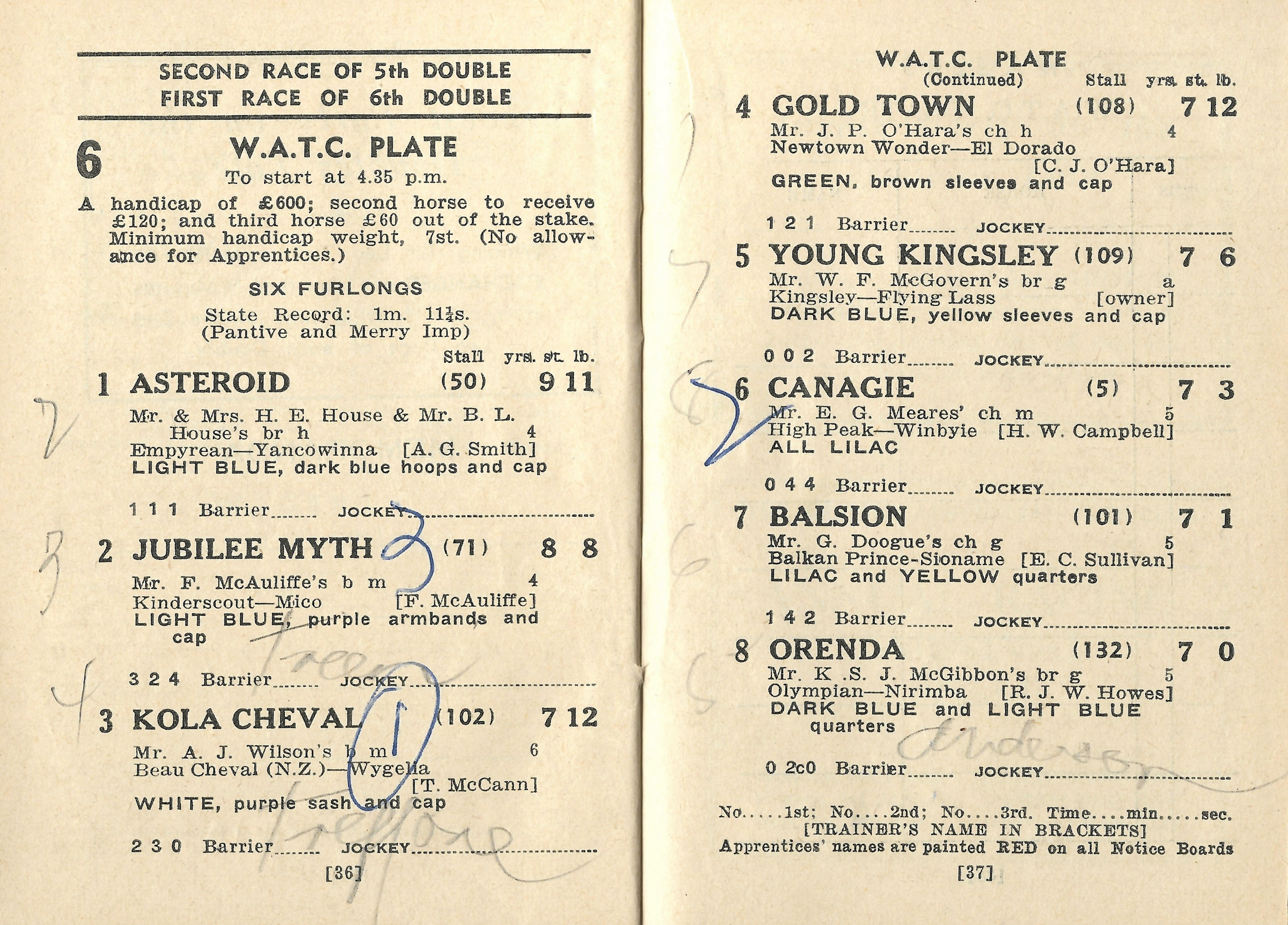
1953 WATC Plate page showing the winner, Kola Cheval

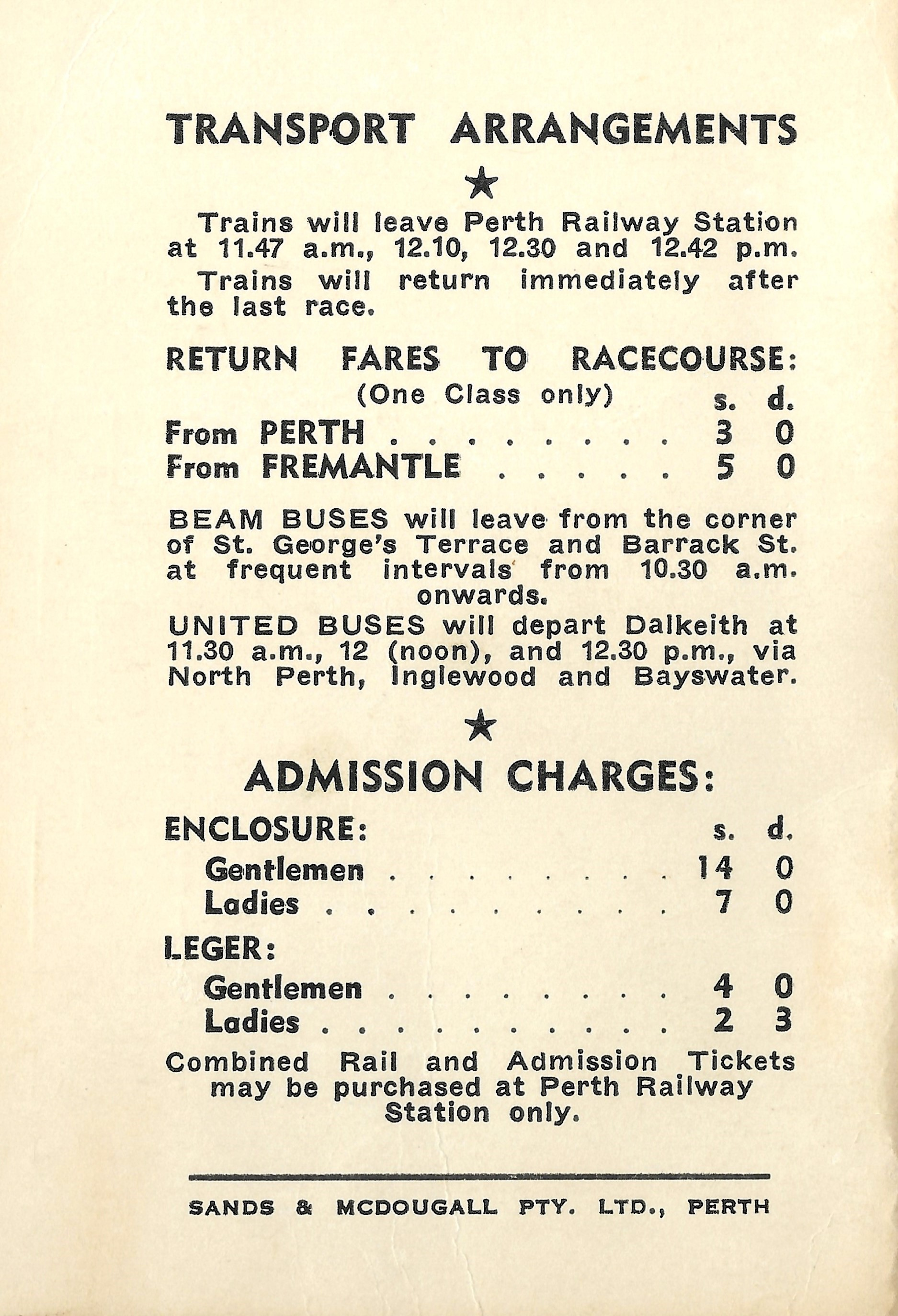
Back cover showing transport arrangements and admission charges

=== Name ===
- 1905–1983 - WATC Plate
- 1984–1986 - Budget Quality Cup
- 1987–1994 - Quality Stakes
- 1995–1998 - WATC Stakes
- 1999 onwards - R.J. Peters Stakes

=== Grade ===
- 1905–1978 - Principal race
- 1979–1985 - Listed race
- 1986 onwards - Group 3

=== Distance ===
- 1905–1971 - 6 furlongs (~1200 metres)
- 1972–1978 – 1200 metres
- 1979–1997 – 1400 metres
- 1998–2002 – 1500 metres
- 2003 – 1600 metres
- 2004 onwards - 1500 metres

== Winners ==
The following are past winners of the race.

- 2026 - Awesome Boy
- 2025 - Storyville
- 2024 - Mojo Rhythm
- 2023 - Mojo Rhythm
- 2022 - Searchin' Roc's
- 2021 - Kissonallforcheeks
- 2020 - Truly Great
- 2019 - Mississippi Delta
- 2018 - Freo
- 2017 - Properantes
- 2016 - Scales Of Justice
- 2015 - Hazzabeel
- 2014 - Bass Strait
- 2013 - Kerrific
- 2012 - Maschino
- 2011 - Westriver Kevydonn
- 2010 - God Has Spoken
- 2009 - Elliotto
- 2008 - Famous Roman
- 2007 - El Presidente
- 2006 - Always A Devil
- 2005 - Rescuer
- 2004 - Finito
- 2003 - Modem
- 2002 - Kensyl Bay
- 2001 - Old Fashion
- 2000 - Northerly
- 1999 - Sister Patricia
- 1998 - All The Aces
- 1997 - Jacks Or Better
- 1996 - Bold Extreme
- 1995 - Quadripedante
- 1994 - Sammy The Bull
- 1993 - Classy Dresser
- 1992 - Vows
- 1991 - Future Edition
- 1990 - Jungle Hero
- 1989 - Dual's Brute
- 1988 - Bowie
- 1987 - Denim Dancer
- 1986 - Western Pago
- 1985 - Haulpak's Image
- 1984 - Eastern Temple
- 1983 - Argentine Gold
- 1982 - Heron Bridge
- 1981 - Cordroy
- 1980 - Tulip Town
- 1979 - Embasadora
- 1978 - Prince Brighton
- 1977 - Belinda's Star
- 1976 - Venetian Princess
- 1975 - Good Morgan
- 1974 - Merry Heart
- 1973 - Starglow
- 1972 - Acello
- 1971 - Royal Spring
- 1970 - My Juliet
- 1969 - Cantanof
- 1968 - Fair Dollar
- 1967 - El Nisir
- 1966 - Tudor Mak
- 1965 - Port Jackson
- 1964 - Norval Boy
- 1963 - Norval Boy
- 1962 - Count Sputnik
- 1961 - Count Sputnik
- 1960 - Olympiad
- 1959 - race not held
- 1958 - race not held
- 1957 - Pegulara
- 1956 - Craghill
- 1955 - Sanfinilo
- 1954 - In Reference
- 1953 - Kola Cheval
- 1952 - Copper Beech
- 1951 - Shining Star
- 1950 - Beau Glory
- 1949 - Zanni
- 1948 - Prince San
- 1947 - Blue Stream
- 1946 - Irish Myth
- 1945 - Dear Brutus
- 1944 - race not held
- 1943 - race not held
- 1942 - race not held
- 1941 - race not held
- 1940 - Atorna
- 1939 - Byronic
- 1938 - Amalette
- 1937 - Tetreen
- 1936 - Gay Gipsy
- 1935 - Gay Gipsy
- 1934 - Old Story
- 1933 - Esmeroic
- 1932 - Alienist
- 1931 - Green Laddie
- 1930 - Einga
- 1929 - Einga
- 1928 - Prince Paladin
- 1927 - Tea Lady
- 1926 - Perfect Juggins
- 1925 - Faucon
- 1924 - Borgia
- 1923 - Jolly Handsome
- 1922 - Ayrlove
- 1921 - True Moon
- 1920 - Susarion
- 1919 - Heart Of Oak
- 1918 - Haud
- 1917 - Headwind
- 1916 - High Gate
- 1915 - Adaleila
- 1914 - Bullie B
- 1913 - Galtee Princess
- 1912 - Owlet
- 1911 - Golden Orb
- 1910 - Katoomba
- 1909 - Thigen Thu
- 1908 - Comatawah
- 1907 - Enchanteur
- 1906 - Attitude
- 1905 - Rustaff

== See also ==
- Colonel Reeves Stakes
- WA Champion Fillies Stakes
- List of Australian Group races
- Group races
