= WA Guineas =

Horse race in Perth, Western Australia

W.A. Guineas
- Class: Group 2
- Location: Ascot Racecourse
- Inaugurated: 1937
- Race type: Thoroughbred
- Sponsor: Duncan Equine (2026)

Race information
- Distance: 1,600 metres
- Surface: Turf
- Track: Left-handed
- Qualification: Three year old
- Weight: Set weights Colts and geldings – 56½ kg Fillies – 54½ kg
- Purse: A$500,000 (2026)

The Western Australian Guineas is a Perth Racing Group 2 Thoroughbred horse race for three-year-olds at set weights run over a distance of 1600 metres at Ascot Racecourse, Perth, Western Australia in November.

== History ==
The race was first held at Ascot racecourse on 15 November 1937, to mark the official date of the King's Birthday, as a weight-for-age mile race for three-year-olds. It was dropped from the race calendar in 1941 due to wartime economies. It was restored in 1943 and was run on the Saturday of the King's Birthday Meeting in November. In 2003 the race was run at Belmont Park Racecourse.

=== Grade ===
- 1937–1978 - Principal race
- 1978 onwards - Group 2

=== Distance ===
- 1937–1971 - 1 mile (1609 metres)
- 1972 onwards - 1600 metres

== Winners ==
The following are past winners of the race.

- 2026 - Beatty
- 2025 - King Of Light
- 2024 - Storyville
- 2023 - Zipaway
- 2022 - Amelia's Jewel
- 2021 - Treasured Star
- 2020 - Watch Me Dance
- 2019 - War Saint
- 2018 - Arcadia Queen
- 2017 - Perfect Jewel
- 2016 - Variation
- 2015 - Man Booker
- 2014 - Rommel
- 2013 - Ihtsahymn
- 2012 - Academus
- 2011 - King Saul
- 2010 - Playing God
- 2009 - Clueless Angel
- 2008 - Moccasin Bend
- 2007 - Megatic
- 2006 - Vain Crusader
- 2005 - Cape North
- 2004 - Dr John
- 2003 - River Mist
- 2002 - The Right Money
- 2001 - Royal Retrieve
- 2000 - Kalatiara
- 1999 - Devilish Dealer
- 1998 - Old Nick
- 1997 - Chelsea
- 1996 - Summer Beau
- 1995 - Bradson
- 1994 - Tip The Pro
- 1993 - El Cordero
- 1992 - Classy Dresser
- 1991 - Vows
- 1990 - So Dashing
- 1989 - Kaysart
- 1988 - My Bobby Boo
- 1987 - Tabharry
- 1986 - Best Time
- 1985 - Ever Ready
- 1984 - Importune
- 1983 - Storm Tide
- 1982 - Rare Flyer
- 1981 - Admiral Star
- 1980 - Fortune Favours
- 1979 - Star God
- 1978 - Rare Sovereign
- 1977 - Caduceus
- 1976 - Blue Nucleus
- 1975 - Ngawyni
- 1974 - Gipsy Prince
- 1973 - High Value
- 1972 - Millefleurs
- 1971 - Indian Shell
- 1970 - Heliolight
- 1969 - Kilrickle
- 1968 - Beau Shar
- 1967 - Super Sam
- 1966 - Jolly Aster
- 1965 - Baccare
- 1964 - Rock Drill
- 1963 - Norval Boy
- 1962 - Nicopolis
- 1961 - Water Power
- 1960 - Chestillion
- 1959 - Queen Of The May
- 1958 - High Channel
- 1957 - Emporium
- 1956 - Fairflow
- 1955 - Mallant
- 1954 - Queen's Favourite
- 1953 - Choya
- 1952 - Raconteur
- 1951 - Chestnut Lady
- 1950 - Jovial Lad
- 1949 - Prediction
- 1948 - Jennie
- 1947 - Westralian
- 1946 - Chieftain Warrior
- 1945 - Cherbourg
- 1944 - Lord Treat
- 1943 - Kingsley
- 1942 - race not held
- 1941 - race not held
- 1940 - Romanette
- 1939 - True Flight
- 1938 - Gay Prince
- 1937 - Footmark

== See also ==
- Railway Stakes
- WA Champion Fillies Stakes
- WA Oaks
- WATC Derby
- Winterbottom Stakes
- List of Australian Group races
- Group races
