= WA Champion Fillies Stakes =

Horse race in Perth, Western Australia

W.A. Champion Fillies Stakes
- Class: Group 3
- Location: Ascot Racecourse, Perth, Western Australia
- Inaugurated: 1946
- Race type: Thoroughbred
- Sponsor: Quayclean (2026)

Race information
- Distance: 1,600 metres
- Surface: Turf
- Track: Left-handed
- Qualification: Three year old fillies
- Weight: Set weights – 55½ kg
- Purse: A$300,000 (2026)

The W. A. (Western Australian) Champion Fillies Stakes is a Perth Racing Group 3 Thoroughbred horse race for three year old fillies at set weights held over 1600 metres, held at Ascot Racecourse, Perth, Western Australia each year in November.

== History ==
- In 2003 the race was run at Belmont Park Racecourse.

=== Grade ===
- 1946–1978 - Principal race
- 1978–1996 - Group 2
- 1997 onwards - Group 3

=== Distance ===
- 1946–1971 - 1 mile (~1600 metres)
- 1972 onwards - 1600 metres

== Winners ==
The following are past winners of the race.

- 2026 - Profit Motive
- 2025 - Pure Excess
- 2024 - Storyville
- 2023 - Keshi Boom
- 2022 - Admiration Express
- 2021 - Searchin' Roc's
- 2020 - Watch Me Dance
- 2019 - Tuscan Queen
- 2018 - Arcadia Queen
- 2017 - Art Series
- 2016 - Samovare
- 2015 - Perfect Reflection
- 2014 - Delicacy
- 2013 - Miss Rose De Lago
- 2012 - Fuddle Dee Duddle
- 2011 (Nov.) - Eight Till Late
- 2011 (Feb.) - Dreamaway
- 2010 - Le Plunge
- 2009 - Danebeela
- 2008 - Spirited One
- 2007 - race not held
- 2006 - Catechuchu
- 2005 - Hi On Love
- 2004 - Stormy Nova
- 2003 - Spirited Lady
- 2002 - Superior Star
- 2001 (Nov.) - Tribula
- 2001 (Apr.) - Miss Precisely
- 2000 - Ellendale
- 1999 - Kim Angel
- 1998 - Calophylia
- 1997 - Duendee
- 1996 - Mercurial Madam
- 1995 - Dance Hi
- 1994 - Zabanella
- 1993 - Prime Again
- 1992 - Chancery Star
- 1991 - Oh Pretty Woman
- 1990 - Strip The Moon
- 1989 - Lady Of Battle
- 1988 - Surfside Lady
- 1987 - Another Omen
- 1986 - Dance Act
- 1985 - Jungle Mist
- 1984 - Entrancing
- 1983 - Taj Bell
- 1982 - Frivolous Lass
- 1981 - All There Is
- 1980 - Queen Inca
- 1979 - Brechin Castle
- 1978 - Mingurie
- 1977 - race not held
- 1976 - Bynsaab
- 1975 - Not Amused
- 1974 - Fondness
- 1973 - Our Pocket
- 1972 - Starglow
- 1971 - Irish Faith
- 1970 - Arborescent
- 1969 - Polo Jane
- 1968 - La Trice
- 1967 - Merry Flute
- 1966 - Fair Dollar
- 1965 - Muette
- 1964 - Kev's Folly
- 1963 - Dinna Tell
- 1962 - Astra Vista
- 1961 - Carol Vista
- 1960 - Blue Rose
- 1959 - Queen Of The May
- 1958 - Countess Blanche
- 1957 - Cheeky Jan
- 1956 - Lady Orator
- 1955 - Dawdie
- 1955 - Maniana
- 1953 - Copper Beech
- 1953 - Stockette
- 1952 - Chestnut Lady
- 1951 - Roman Maid
- 1950 - Prediction
- 1949 - Jennie
- 1948 - Laroette
- 1947 - Lady Lucia
- 1946 - Burabudy

== See also ==
- Colonel Reeves Stakes
- R J Peters Stakes
- WA Guineas
- WA Oaks
- WATC Derby
- List of Australian Group races
- Group races
