= Roma Cup =

Australian horse race

- Class: Group 3
- Location: Ascot Racecourse, Perth, Western Australia
- Inaugurated: 1966
- Race type: Thoroughbred
- Sponsor: PKF (2021-2026)

Race information
- Distance: 1,200 metres
- Surface: Turf
- Qualification: Open
- Weight: Weight for Age
- Purse: $200,000 (2026)

The Roma Cup is a Perth Racing Group 3 Thoroughbred horse race held under Weight for Age conditions, over a distance of 1,200 metres at Ascot Racecourse, Perth, Western Australia in April.

== History ==
The race was created to commemorate the first time Italian soccer team AS Roma visited Perth in 1966, where they defeated the West Australian state side 4-2 at Perry Lakes Stadium.

=== Grade ===
- 1966–1979 - Principal Race
- 1980 onwards - Group 3

=== Distance ===
- 1966 - 1 1/4 miles
- 1967–1968 - 1 mile
- 1969–1972 - 7 furlongs
- 1973 - 1400 metres
- 1974 - 1600 metres
- 1975–1979 - 1400 metres
- 1980 onwards - 1200 metres

=== Venue ===
- 1966-2016 Belmont Park Racecourse
- 2017 onwards Ascot Racecourse

== Winners ==
The following are past winners of the race.

- 2026 - Rope Them In
- 2025 - The Boss Lady
- 2024 - Oscar's Fortune
- 2023 - Amelia's Jewel
- 2022 - Elite Street
- 2021 - Money Matters
- 2020 - Vega Magic
- 2019 - Vital Silver
- 2018 - Rock Magic
- 2017 - Rock Magic
- 2016 - Battle Hero
- 2015 - Luckygray
- 2014 - Magnifisio
- 2013 - Power Princess
- 2012 - Luckygray
- 2011 - Grand Nirvana
- 2010 - Vain Raider
- 2009 - Grand Nirvana
- 2008 - El Presidente
- 2007 - No Questions
- 2006 - Is Amazing
- 2005 - Avenida Madero
- 2004 - Modem
- 2003 - Tribula
- 2002 - Kaprats
- 2001 - Secret Remedy
- 2000 - Star System
- 1999 - Papillion
- 1998 - Double Blue
- 1997 - Singing The Blues
- 1996 - Red Eye Special
- 1995 - Defensive Play
- 1994 - Wabasso
- 1993 - Doctor Golly
- 1992 - Doctor Golly
- 1991 - Faneso
- 1990 - Century God
- 1989 - Straight Cash
- 1988 - Miss Muffet
- 1987 - Beau's Your Uncle
- 1986 - Hanging In
- 1985 - Novrak
- 1984 - Official Receiver
- 1983 - Wild Side
- 1982 - Wild Side
- 1981 - Tangiers
- 1980 - Tangiers
- 1979 - National Boy
- 1978 - Pirate's Den
- 1977 - Private Section
- 1976 - Super Red
- 1975 - Craigie Boy
- 1974 - Clear Mak
- 1973 - Clear Mak
- 1972 - Bernvale
- 1971 - Star Glitter
- 1970 - King Orator
- 1969 - Firelight
- 1968 - Santaland
- 1967 - Chemech
- 1966 - Summer Storm

== See also ==
- Gimcrack Stakes (PR)
- WA Oaks
- Northam Stakes
- Winterbottom Stakes
- List of Australian Group races
- Group races
