= WATC Derby =

Horse race in Perth, Western Australia

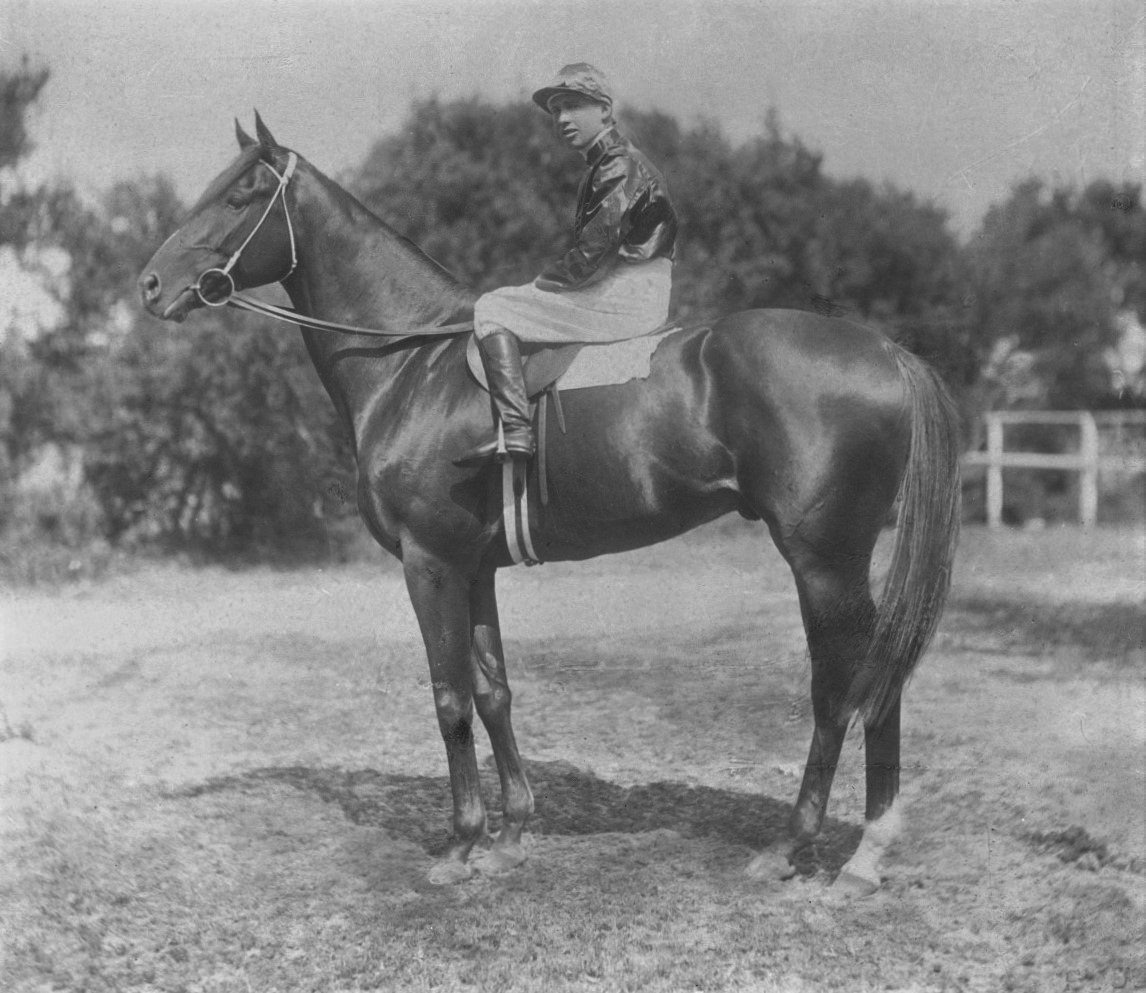
- Eurythmic, 1919 winner
- Class: Group 2
- Location: Ascot Racecourse, Perth, Western Australia
- Inaugurated: 1888
- Race type: Thoroughbred
- Sponsor: Schweppes (2026)

Race information
- Distance: 2,400 metres
- Surface: Turf
- Qualification: Three-year-olds
- Weight: Set weights colts and geldings – 56 1/2 kg fillies – 54 1/2 kg
- Purse: $400,000 (2026)

The WATC Derby, also known as the Western Australia Derby, is a Perth Racing Group 2 Thoroughbred horse race for three-year-olds, at set weights, over a distance of 2400 metres at Ascot Racecourse in Perth, Western Australia in April.

== History ==
The inaugural running of the race was on 2 January 1888 as the first race on the second day of WATC Summer Meeting which was highlighted by The Queen's Plate. The race was called the West Australia Derby, with prizemoney of 100 sovereigns with an additional sweep of 2 sovereigns for the second place horse. Colonial bred horses were allowed 5 pounds allowance. The filly, Harridan started as the even money favourite and won by 2 lengths.

The race continued to be part of the WATC Summer Carnival until 1988 when it was moved to April. The club reverted to the summer schedule in 1993 but by 2002 the race was again being held in April.

=== 1953 racebook ===
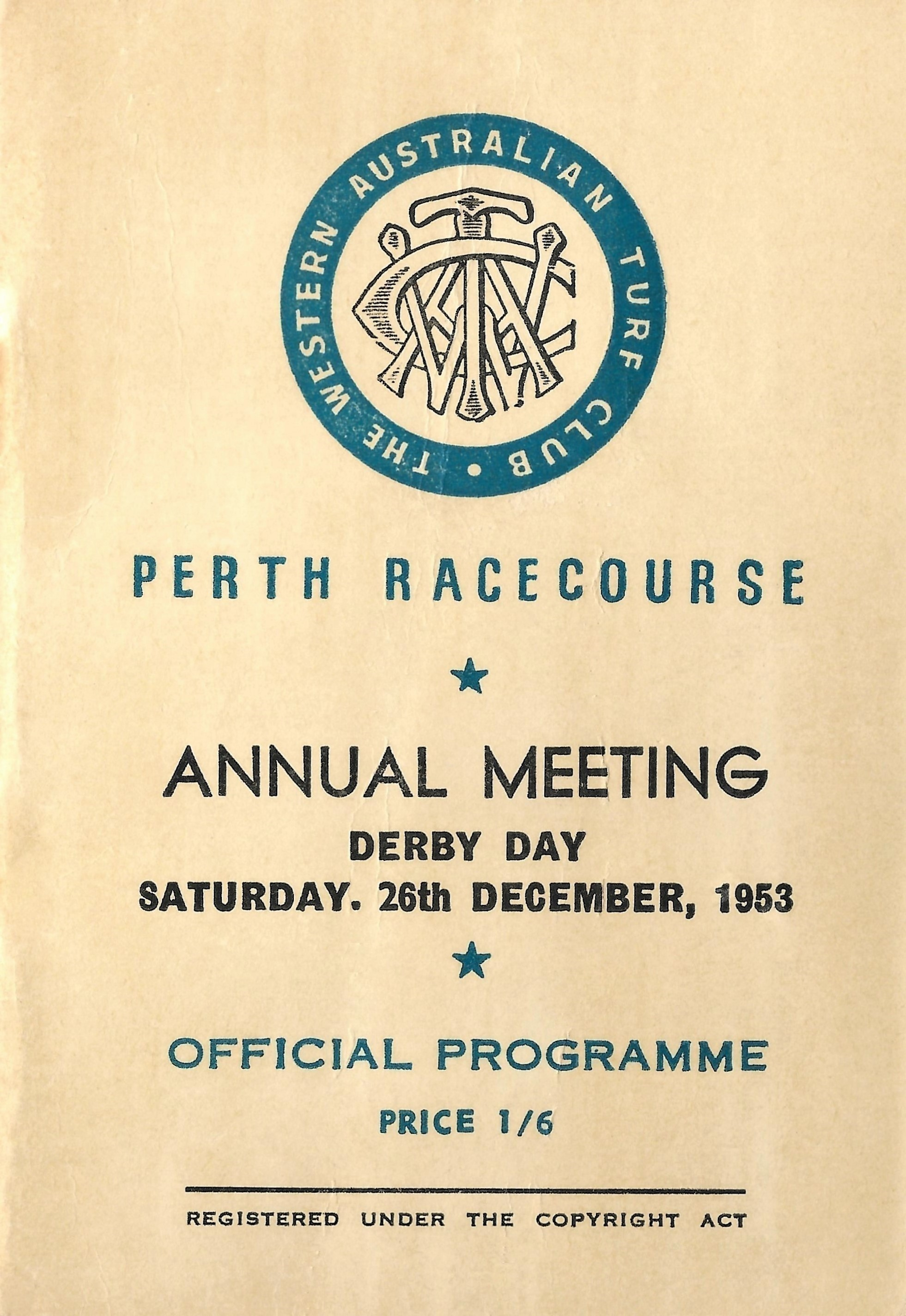
1953 WATC Derby racebook front cover

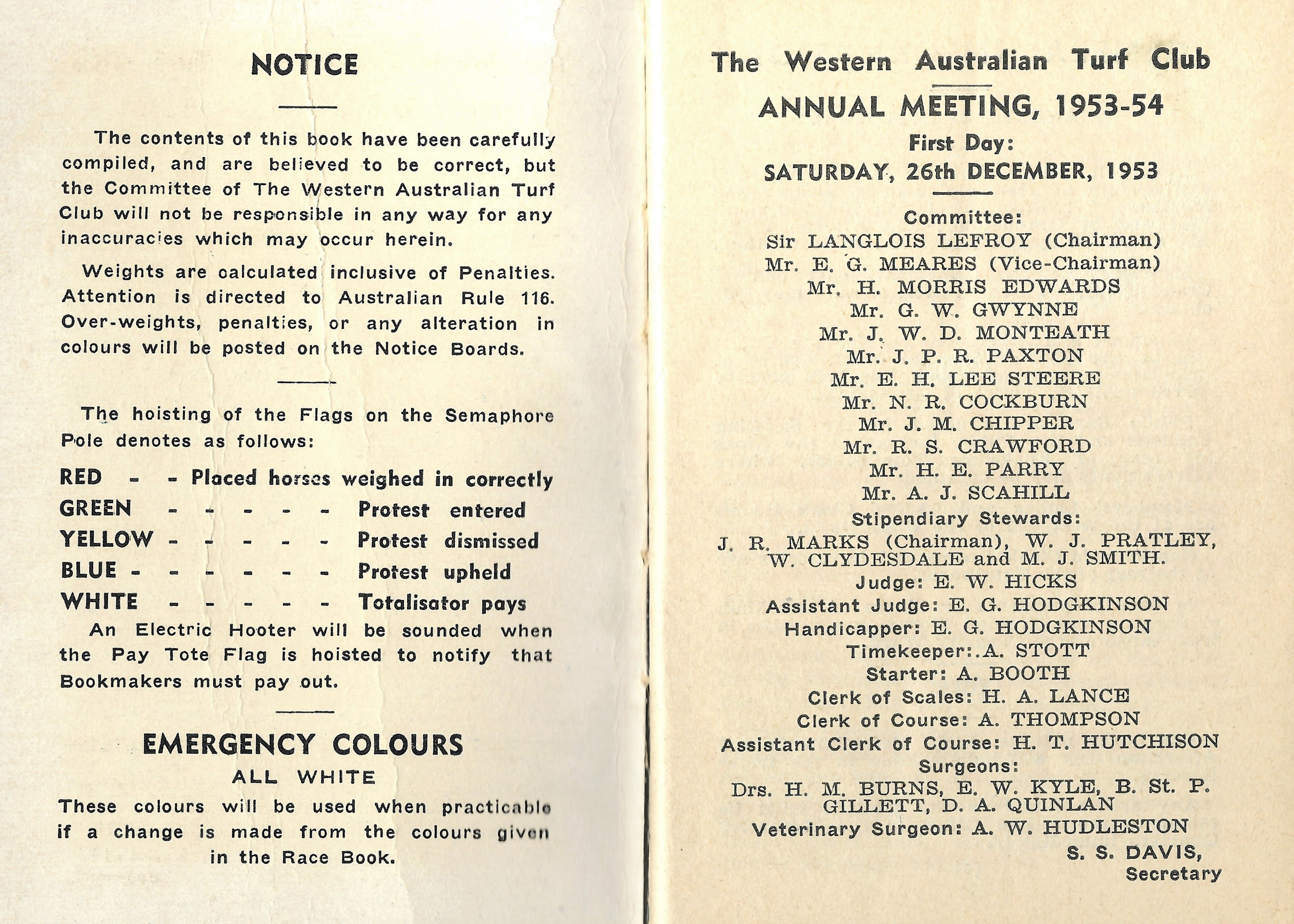
1953 WATC Derby showing raceday officials

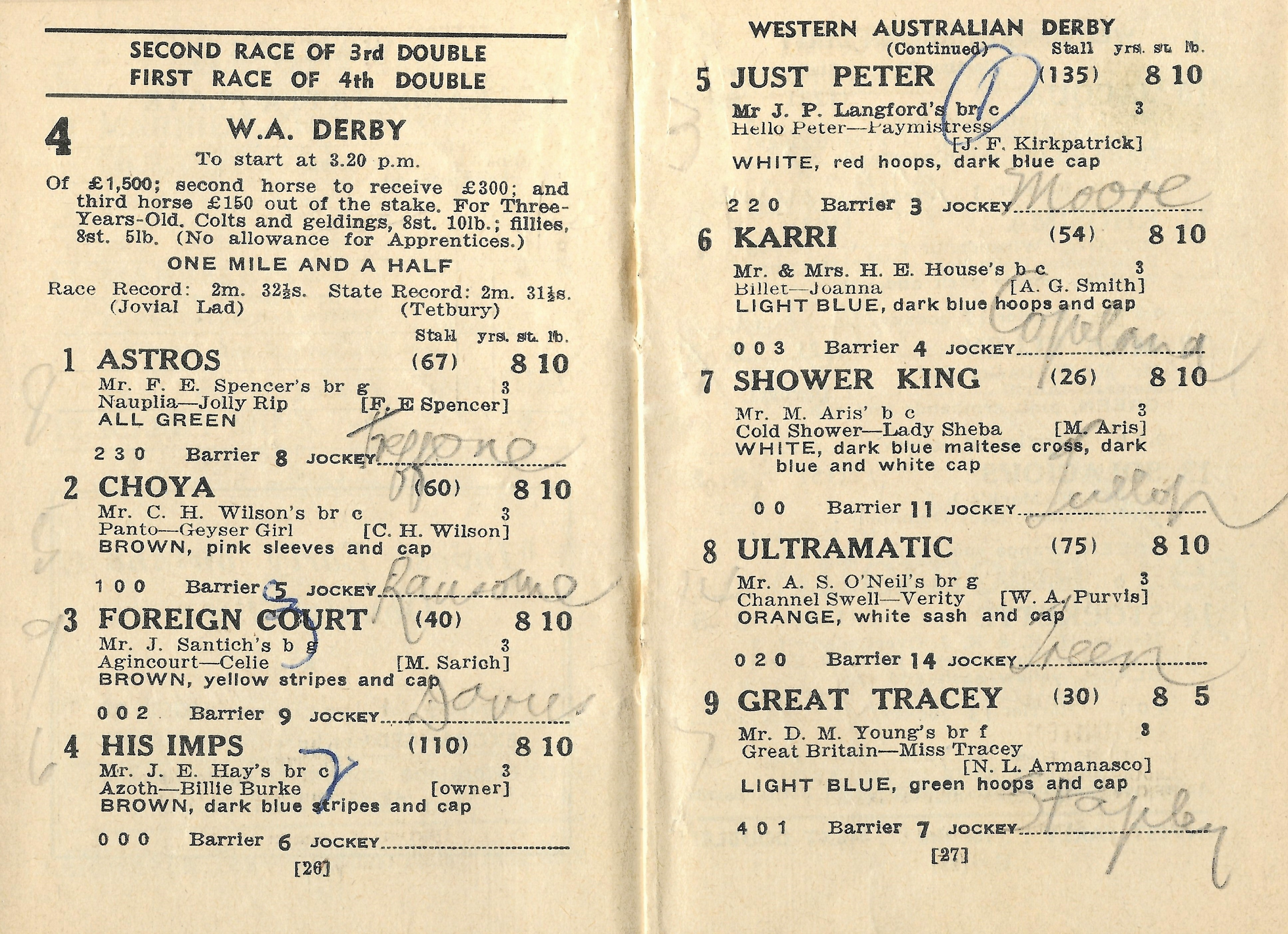
1953 WATC Derby showing the winner, Just Peter

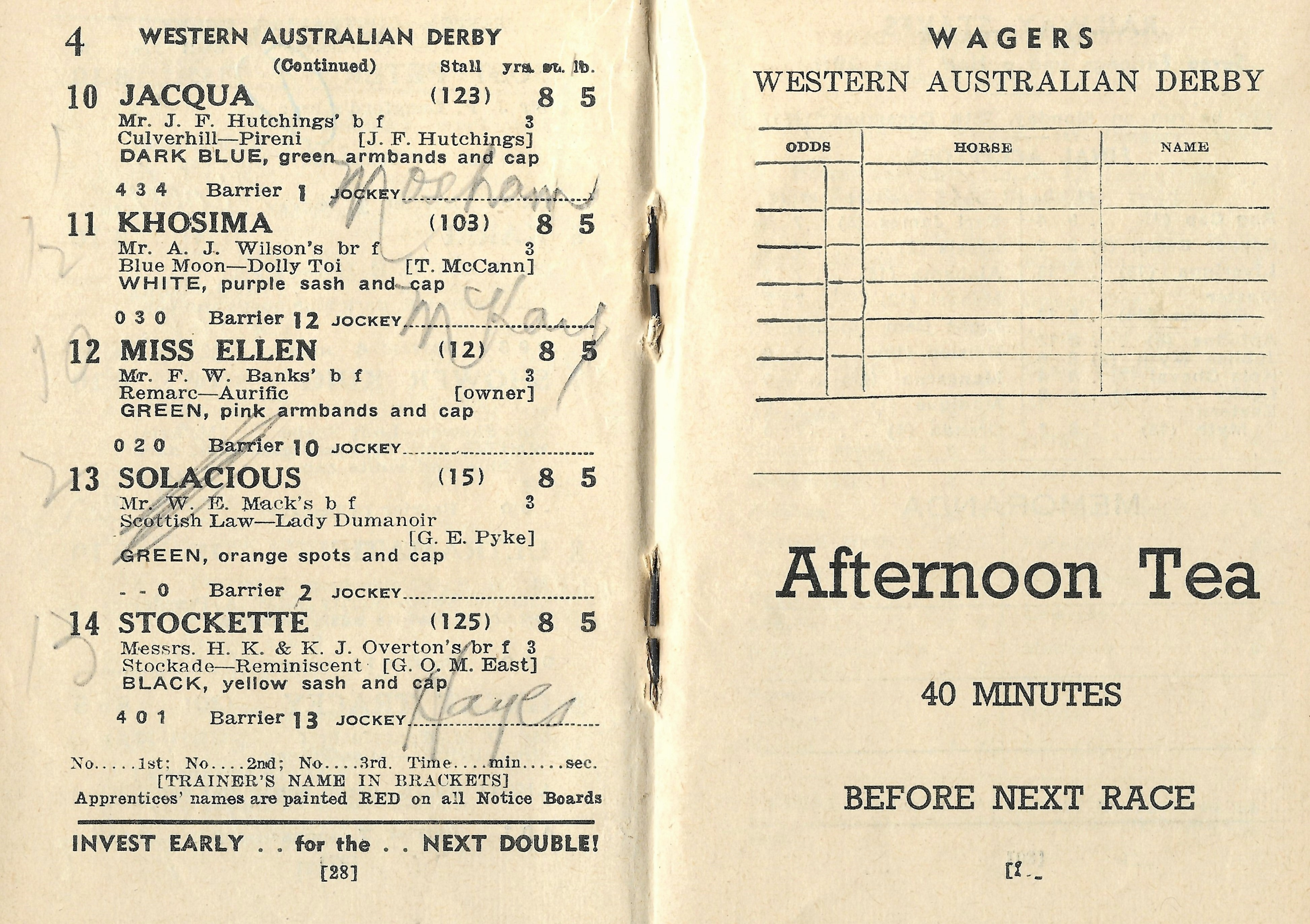
1953 WATC Derby starters and results

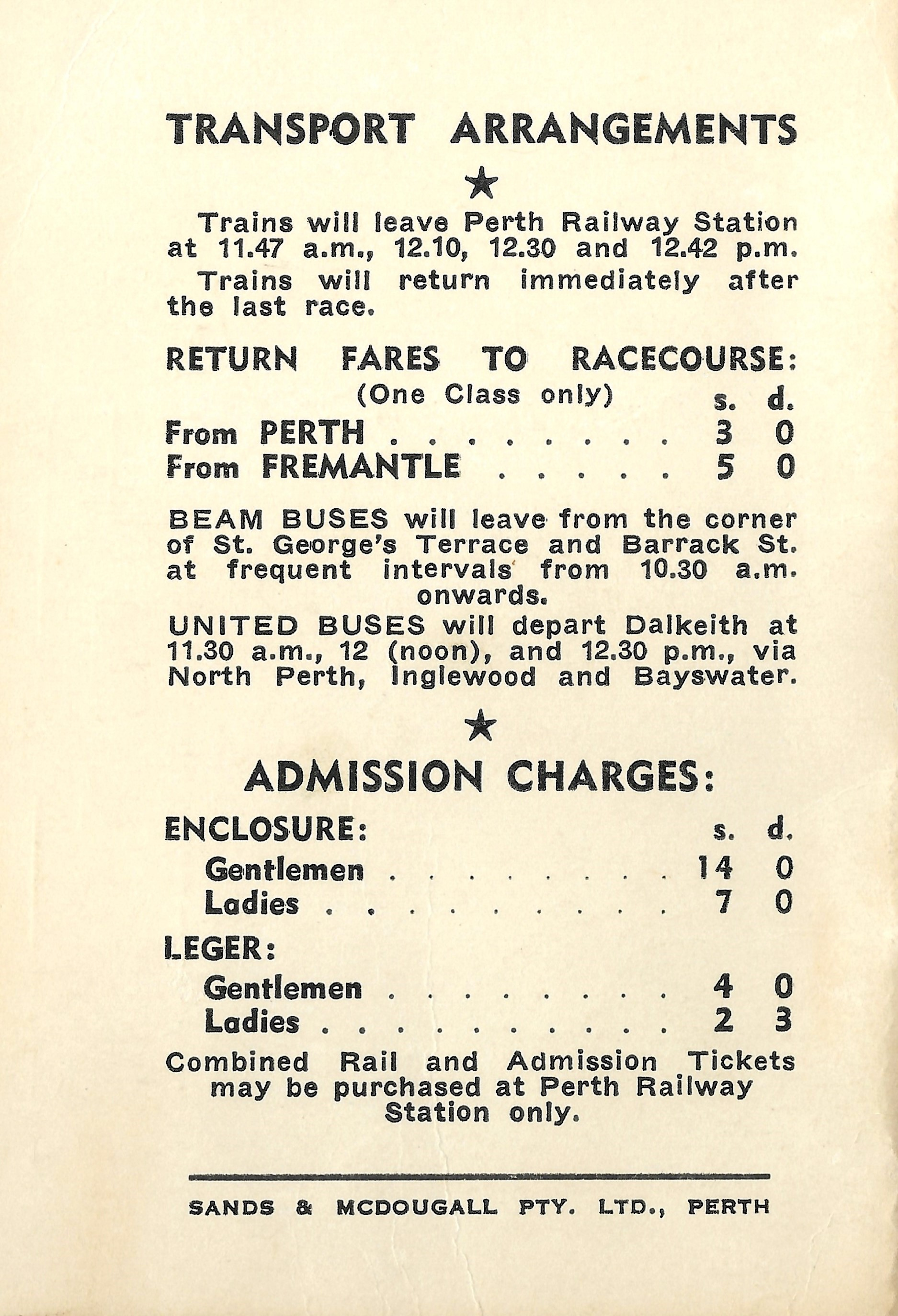
Back cover showing transport arrangements and admission charges

=== Grade ===
- 1888–1978 - Principal Race
- 1979–1991 - Group 1
- 1992–1993 - Group 2
- 1994–2011 - Group 1
- 2012 onwards - Group 2

=== Venue ===
- In 2005 the race was run at Belmont Park Racecourse.

== Winners ==
The following are past winners of the race.

- 2026 - Sentimental Legend
- 2025 - Machine Gun Gracie
- 2024 - A Lot of Good Men
- 2023 - Awesome John (Note: The 2023 winner Awesome John was later exported to Hong Kong and renamed Awesome Fluke)
- 2022 - Alaskan God
- 2021 - Western Empire
- 2020 - Tuscan Queen
- 2019 - Regal Power
- 2018 - Action
- 2017 - Gatting
- 2016 - Arcadia Dream
- 2015 - Delicacy
- 2014 - Respondent
- 2013 - Mystic Prince
- 2012 - Rohan
- 2011 - Dreamaway
- 2010 - Chartreux
- 2009 - Markus Maximus
- 2008 - Grand Journey
- 2007 - Guyno
- 2006 - Cats Fun
- 2005 - Plastered
- 2004 - Mr Sandgroper
- 2003 - Shirazamatazz
- 2002 - Honor Lap
- 2001 - ¶race not held
- 2000 - Old Money
- 1999 - Voile D'Or
- 1998 - Kim Angel
- 1997 - Hot Jules
- 1996 - Capricious Lass
- 1995 - Crying Game
- 1994 - Beaux Art
- ♯1993 (Dec) - Beaujolais Boy
- 1993 (May) - Firing Range
- 1992 - Heroicity
- 1991 - Mirror Magic
- 1990 - Chipolata
- 1989 - Belele
- 1988 - The Bukhra
- 1987 - ¶race not held
- 1986 - Joindre
- 1985 - Rant And Rave
- 1984 - National Gallery
- 1983 - Old Currency
- 1982 - Rare Flyer
- 1981 - Vortilla
- 1980 - Seltrice
- 1979 - Mighty Kingdom
- 1978 - Regimental Honour
- 1977 - Stormy Rex
- 1976 - Chasta Bellota
- 1975 - Ngawyni
- 1974 - Bottled Sunshine
- 1973 - Asgard
- 1972 - Dayana
- 1971 - Ride Easy
- 1970 - Chez Felix
- 1969 - Surrender
- 1968 - Hidalios
- 1967 - Sir Chatary
- 1966 - Redacre
- 1965 - Baccare
- 1964 - Kev's Folly
- 1963 - Gojon
- 1962 - Nicopolis
- 1961 - Magic Colour
- 1960 - Chestillion
- 1959 - Little Empire
- 1958 - England's Dust
- 1957 - Nhargo
- 1956 - Lady Orator
- 1955 - Mallant
- 1954 - Asterios
- 1953 - Just Peter
- 1952 - Raconteur
- 1951 - Smart Chief
- 1950 - Jovial Lad
- 1949 - Prediction
- 1948 - Precedent
- 1947 - Westralian
- 1946 - Lady Lucia
- 1945 - Cherbourg
- 1944 - Lord Treat
- 1943 - Kalamunda
- 1942 - Pantheist
- 1941 - Kimra
- 1940 - Hestia
- 1939 - True Flight
- 1938 - Gay Prince
- 1937 - Footmark
- 1936 - Oceanus
- 1935 - Yaringa
- 1934 - Hyperion
- 1933 - Panto
- 1932 - Olympian
- 1931 - Isle Of Astur
- 1930 - Beaunilly, owned by Amelia Bunbury
- 1929 - Ozonia
- 1928 - Second Wind
- 1927 - Hint
- 1926 - Maple
- 1925 - Sir Alwyne
- 1924 - Huette
- 1923 - Lilypond
- 1922 - Killiecrankie
- 1921 - Easingwold
- 1920 - Fluent
- 1919 - Eurythmic
- 1918 - Oyadu
- 1917 - Green Lord
- 1916 - Yandil
- 1915 - Pillotos
- 1914 - Mistico
- 1913 - Radnor
- 1912 - Dueler
- 1911 - Ayrville
- 1910 - Renegade
- 1909 - Jolly Beggar
- 1908 - Thorina
- 1907 - Post Town
- 1906 - Benbow
- 1905 - Piata
- 1904 - Keston
- 1903 - Bandolier
- 1902 - Honeydew
- 1901 - Trionia
- 1900 - Warrior II
- 1899 - †Ormuz / Wairiri
- 1898 - Tarquin
- 1897 - Le Var
- 1896 - Inverary
- 1895 - Florrie
- 1894 - ¤Carbine
- 1893 - Scarpia
- 1892 - Karratha
- 1891 - ‡The Crash
- 1890 - St. Ives
- 1889 - Aim
- 1888 - Harridan

♯ The race was run twice in 1993 when the WATC restored the running to the original date prior to New Year's Day for the 1993–94 racing season.
¶ Race moved in the 1987–88 racing calendar forward and run in the autumn of 1988.
The race was once again moved from the traditional summer Christmas/New Year's Day Carnival forward to the autumn of 2002.
† Race was run twice in 1899. Ormuz won on New Year's Day in 1899. The next racing season (1899-1900) the race was held on 30 December 1899.
¤ Not to be confused with the great Carbine from the same era. The 1894 winner, Carbine's ((AUS) H, 1890) breeding was Termando — Trishna.
‡ Won the race on walkover. The owner promptly entered The Crash in the prestigious (at the time) Queen's Plate over a distance of 3 miles where The Crash finished in fourth place.

== See also ==
- WA Champion Fillies Stakes
- WA Guineas
- WA Oaks
- List of Australian Group races
- Group races
