= The Quokka =

Horse race in Perth, Western Australia

- Location: Ascot Racecourse
- Inaugurated: 2023
- Race type: Thoroughbred
- Sponsor: BYD (2026)

Race information
- Distance: 1,200 metres
- Surface: Turf
- Track: Left-handed (Anti-Clockwise)
- Qualification: Two years old and older
- Weight: Weight for age
- Purse: A$5,000,000 (2026)

The Quokka is a Perth Racing special conditions Thoroughbred horse race held over a distance of 1200 metres at Ascot Racecourse in Perth, Western Australia. Held in mid April, the slot race offers a A$5,000,000 prize pool, the most of any horse race in Western Australia.

== History ==
In September 2022, Racing and Wagering Western Australia announced the introduction of The Quokka, a new A$4,000,000 special conditions slot-holder race, to be held in April of the following year at Ascot Racecourse. Named after the native Western Australian marsupial of the same name, the race was created to help revamp the autumn carnival. As per the conditions of a slot race, the field is open to 13 slot holders at a cost of A$200,000 each.

The inaugural Quokka was held on 15 April 2023, with Sydney-galloper Overpass winning by a nose over local talent Amelia's Jewel. In August 2023, the prize money was increased by A$1,000,000. The second running of the race was held on 20 April 2024, with Overpass winning again to record consecutive victories.

== Records ==
Fastest time: (at a distance of 1200 metres)

- 1:08.88 – Overpass (2024)

Most wins:

- 2 – Overpass (2023, 2024)

Most wins by a jockey:

- 2 – Joshua Parr (2023, 2024)

Most wins by a trainer:

- 2 – Bjorn Baker (2023, 2024)

== Winners ==
The following are past winners of the race:

- 2026 – Jigsaw
- 2025 – Jokers Grin
- 2024 – Overpass
- 2023 – Overpass

== See also ==
- The Everest
- Karrakatta Plate
