= Winterbottom Stakes =

Horse race in Perth, Western Australia

- Class: Group 1
- Location: Ascot Racecourse
- Inaugurated: 1952
- Race type: Thoroughbred

Race information
- Distance: 1,200 metres
- Surface: Turf
- Track: Left-handed
- Qualification: Three years old and older
- Weight: Weight for age
- Purse: A$1,500,000 (2025)

The Winterbottom Stakes is a Perth Racing Group 1 Thoroughbred horse race held under weight for age conditions, for horses aged three and upwards, over a distance of 1200 metres at Ascot Racecourse, Perth, Western Australia in November.

== History ==
The race has grown in importance over the recent years with increases in prizemoney and class and has become Western Australia's premier sprint race. The race is run on the middle weekend of the Perth Summer Carnival, being run the week after the Railway Stakes and WA Guineas, and the weekend before the Kingston Town Classic.

In 2003 the race was run at Belmont Park Racecourse.

The prizemoney was raised to $1 million in 2015.

=== Grade ===
- 1937–1978 - Principal race
- 1979–2010 - Group 2
- 2011 onwards - Group 1

=== Distance ===
- 1952–1971 - 7 furlongs (~1400 metres)
- 1972–1993 – 1400 metres
- 1994 onwards - 1200 metres

Fastest time: (at a distance of 1200 metres)

- 1:08.17 – Buffering (2015)

== Winners ==
Past winners of the race are as follows.

- 2025 - Libertad
- 2024 - Overpass
- 2023 - Overpass
- 2022 - Paulele
- 2021 - Graceful Girl
- 2020 - Elite Street
- 2019 - Hey Doc
- 2018 - Voodoo Lad
- 2017 - Viddora
- 2016 - Takedown
- 2015 - Buffering
- 2014 - Magnifisio
- 2013 - Buffering
- 2012 - Barakey
- 2011 - Ortensia
- 2010 - Hadabeclorka
- 2009 - Ortensia
- 2008 - Takeover Target
- 2007 - Glory Hunter
- 2006 - Marasco
- 2005 - Miss Andretti
- 2004 - Ellicorsam
- 2003 - Hardrada
- 2002 - Hardrada
- 2001 - Fair Alert
- 2000 - Noble Sky
- 1999 - Double Blue
- 1998 - Bradson
- 1997 - Cranky Tikit
- 1996 - French Sound
- 1995 - Jacks Or Better
- 1994 - Petite Amour
- 1993 - Sir Tinka
- 1992 - Barrosa Boy -
- 1991 - M'Lady's Jewel
- 1990 - Century God
- 1989 - Carry A Smile
- 1988 - Sky Filou
- 1987 - Placid Ark
- 1986 - Fimiston
- 1985 - Jungle Mist
- 1984 - Casshoney
- 1983 - Hanging In
- 1982 - Nitro Lad
- 1981 - Soldier Of Fortune
- 1980 - Scarlet Gem
- 1979 - Asian Beau
- 1978 - Marjoleo
- 1977 - Romantic Dream
- 1976 - Belinda's Star
- 1975 - Belinda's Star
- 1974 - My Friend Paul
- 1973 - Starglow
- 1972 - Acello
- 1971 - La Trice
- 1970 - La Trice
- 1969 - Sherolythe
- 1968 - Torecan
- 1967 - Railway Boy
- 1966 - Aquitania
- 1965 - Watersan
- 1964 - Copper Son
- 1963 - Big Bob
- 1962 - Nicopolis
- 1961 - Coco
- 1960 - On Guard
- 1959 - Young Filipino
- 1958 - Bebe Grande
- 1957 - Fairflow
- 1956 - Mcharry
- 1955 - Asteroid
- 1954 - Chestnut Lady
- 1953 - Asteroid
- 1952 - Raconteur

== See also ==
- Northam Stakes
- Railway Stakes
- Roma Cup
- WA Guineas
- List of Australian Group races
- Group races
