= Angst Stakes =

Angst Stakes registered as Angst Quality Handicap
- Class: Group 3
- Location: Randwick Racecourse, Sydney, Australia
- Inaugurated: 1994
- Race type: Thoroughbred
- Sponsor: Asahi Super Dry (2025 & 2026)

Race information
- Distance: 1,600 metres
- Surface: Turf
- Track: Right-handed
- Qualification: Mares, four-year-old and older
- Weight: Set weights with penalties
- Purse: $250,000 (2026)

The Angst Stakes, registered as the Angst Quality Handicap, is an Australian Turf Club Group 3 Thoroughbred horse race for four-year-old mares and up, run at set weights with penalties, over a distance of 1600 metres at Randwick Racecourse, Sydney, Australia in October.

== History ==
The race is named in honour of the 3 year old, grey filly named Angst. The winner of 7 races from 10 starts in 1993, including the Silver Shadow Stakes, Furious Stakes, Tea Rose Stakes and the Flight Stakes. The filly died the same year when undergoing a procedure to remove polyps from her larynx.

=== Name ===
- 1994–2004 - Angst Mares Quality Handicap
- 2005 onwards - Angst Stakes

=== Venue ===
- 2006–2010 - Randwick Racecourse
- 2011–2012 - Rosehill Racecourse
- 2013 onwards - Randwick Racecourse

=== Grade ===
- 1994–2012 - Listed race
- 2013 onwards - Group 3

=== Distance ===
- 1994–2011 - 1,400 metres
- 2012 - 1,500 metres
- 2013 onwards - 1,600 metres

== Winners ==
the following are past winners of the race.

- 2026 - Unleeshing
- 2025 - Idle Flyer
- 2024 - Lekvarte
- 2023 - Renaissance Woman
- 2022 - Hope In Your Heart
- 2021 - Mirra Vision
- 2020 - Emeralds
- 2019 - Nettoyer
- 2018 - I Am Serious
- 2017 - Dixie Blossoms
- 2016 - Dixie Blossoms
- 2015 - Casino Dancer
- 2014 - Neena Rock
- 2013 - Sharnee Rose
- 2012 - Nocturnelle
- 2011 - Little Surfer Girl
- 2010 - Lovemelikearock
- 2009 - Illuminates
- 2008 - Neroli
- 2007 - †race not held
- 2006 - More Than Lucky
- 2005 - Wild Queen
- 2004 - Hennessy Waltz
- 2003 - Zanna (NZ)
- 2002 - Miss Zoe
- 2001 - Danasia
- 2000 - Prenuptial
- 1999 - Roseville
- 1998 - Zalinda
- 1997 - Stoneyfell Road
- 1996 - Rich Aunty
- 1995 - Chlorophyll
- 1994 - Sky Watch

† Not held because of outbreak of equine influenza

== See also ==
- The Everest
- King Charles III Stakes
- The Kosciuszko
- Reginald Allen Quality
- St Leger Stakes
- Sydney Stakes
- List of Australian Group races
- Group races
