= Buffering (horse) =

Australian-bred Thoroughbred racehorse

- Sire: Mossman
- Grandsire: Success Express
- Dam: Action Annie
- Damsire: Anabaa
- Sex: Gelding
- Foaled: 2007
- Country: Australia
- Color: Bay
- Breeder: Racetree
- Owner: V Heathcote, S Krslovic, C Moore, R Ciobo, D Merola, C Lord, Crafty Racing Synd, Aspariamo Racing Synd & B Harry
- Racing colors: Blue & black checks
- Trainer: Robert Heathcote
- Record: 51:19–9–8
- Earnings: AU$7,238,955

Major wins
- Roman Consul Stakes (2010); Victory Stakes (2011, 2013); McEwen Stakes (2011); A J Moir Stakes (2012, 2015, 2014); VRC Sprint Classic (2013); Manikato Stakes (2013); Winterbottom Stakes (2015, 2013); Al Quoz Sprint (2016)

Buffering (foaled 5 November 2007) is a retired Australian Thoroughbred racehorse. A gelding, Buffering is one of the highest-money-earning horses in Australian racing history, having surpassed $7 million in earnings on 26 March 2016, by winning the 2016 Al Quoz Sprint at the Meydan Racecourse during the 2016 Dubai World Cup race meeting. Buffering is the seventh horse in Australian history to surpass $7 million in prizemoney and the first Queensland bred horse to do so.

Buffering was a notable racetrack rival of retired, undefeated champion sprinting mare Black Caviar and despite never beating her, outlasted her on the track, went on to earn a comparable amount of prizemoney and has won many Group 1 races himself. Buffering competed with many of the greatest modern-day Australian sprinters throughout his career including aforementioned Black Caviar, Chautauqua, Hay List, Sepoy, Foxwedge, Terravista and Lankan Rupee, a claim that no other horse can make. He was foaled in Queensland, is trained by Queensland trainer Robert Heathcote, owned by Queenslanders including Heathcote himself and has been ridden throughout his career by Queensland-based jockey Damian Browne. As of March 2016 Buffering is the highest-earning Queensland racehorse of all time. He was sired by Mossman out of Action Annie.

== Background and early career ==
Buffering was bought for $22,000 at the 2009 Magic Millions QTIS 600 Yearling Sale by trainer Robert Heathcote and upon his racetrack debut found immediate success winning his first four starts as a two-year-old. In his fifth start, and first at stakes level, Buffering was beaten for the first time in the Group 2 Bollinger Champagne Classic, finishing third with future Group 1 winners Pressday and Spirit of Boom finishing ahead of him in first and second, respectively.

Buffering's first group class win came in the Group 2 Roman Consul Stakes at Randwick in his ninth start. Two starts later Buffering ran in his first Group 1 race, the Coolmore Stud Stakes at Flemington finishing fourth on Victoria Derby Day.

== Four-, five- and six-year-old seasons ==
Buffering continued to perform well despite running into an impressive selection of successful sprinters during the middle part of his career. After the Coolmore Stud Stakes as a three-year-old, he competed in a further 16 Group 1 races before he won one, with Black Caviar, Sepoy, Foxwedge, Hay List and Sea Siren among the horses that defeated Buffering during this time. Of the first 17 Group 1 races he competed in, he placed in ten. He also managed to win five lesser group races during this time. It was not until October 2013, at his 36th racetrack start and as a six-year-old that Buffering won his first Group 1 race, the Manikato Stakes. He then went on to win Group 1 races at both of his next starts, winning the VRC Sprint and the Winterbottom Stakes in the Spring before returning in the Autumn to contest the TJ Smith Stakes, where he first encountered and was defeated by Lankan Rupee. He then returned to his home state of Queensland with a view to contesting the Stradbroke Handicap but after failing to win in either of his two starts in the Group 1 BTC Cup and Group 1 Doomben 10,000 Buffering was spelled.

== Seven- and eight-year-old seasons and retirement ==
As a seven-year-old, Buffering returned to Melbourne to compete in the Spring Racing Carnival, where he won his next Group 1 race, the Moir Stakes, turning the tables on his TJ Smith Stakes conqueror Lankan Rupee. He was subsequently defeated at his next two starts, running seventh behind Lankan Rupee when defending the Manikato Stakes and fourth in the Darley Classic, a race where he met Chautauqua and Terravista for the first time, with the latter winning. Buffering was then sent abroad for the first time. In December 2014, Buffering raced in the Hong Kong Sprint and, having been defeated at his prior two starts, was sent out as a 40/1 chance. He finished an admirable sixth in his first foray into international racing.

Illness and injury plagued his seven-year-old season, as he was forced to miss the Sydney Autumn and Brisbane Winter carnivals for the first time in his career. It was not until his eight-year-old season, in spring 2015, that Buffering returned to the track, winning his track return in the Moir Stakes, making him a three-time winner. That win was followed up by him being sent to Perth and winning the Winterbottom Stakes for the second time. In January 2016 he raced at the Gold Coast Magic Millions carnival, winning the Magic Millions Plate. He was then rested before being sent to Dubai in March for the Dubai World Cup Night G1 Al Quoz Sprint, where as a 9/1 chance he won his first race on international soil and surpassed $7 million in career money earnings. The Al Quoz Sprint win marked the biggest win in his career aged eight and was his seventh Group 1 victory. He finished last in the Chairman's Sprint Prize 2016 in Hong Kong on 1 May and after an unsuccessful return to Australian racing during the Melbourne Spring Racing Carnival was retired as the highest-earning Queensland bred racehorse of all time.
