= Sydney Stakes =

- Class: Group 2
- Location: Randwick Racecourse, Sydney, Australia
- Inaugurated: 1968 (as City Tattersall’s Lightning)
- Race type: Thoroughbred - flat
- Sponsor: Toyota Forklifts (2024-2026)

Race information
- Distance: 1,200 metres
- Surface: Turf
- Track: Right-handed
- Qualification: Horses three years old and older
- Weight: Weight for age
- Purse: A$2,000,000 (2026)

The Sydney Stakes is a City Tattersalls Club Group 2 Thoroughbred horse race run under Weight for Age conditions, over a distance of 1200 metres at Randwick Racecourse, Sydney, Australia in October.

== History ==
The original name of the race was the City Tattersall’s Lightning Handicap. It was renamed in 2017 as the Sydney Stakes, for horses that are not entered in The Everest.

=== Grade ===
- 1968–1978 - Principal Race
- 1978–2017 - Listed Race
- 2018–2025 - Group 3
- 2026 onwards - Group 2

=== Venue ===
- 1968–1982 - Randwick Racecourse
- 1983 - Warwick Farm Racecourse
- 1984 onwards - Randwick Racecourse

=== Distance ===
- 1968–1971 - 5 furlongs
- 1972–2000 - 1000 metres
- 2001 - 870 metres
- 2002–2005 - 1000 metres
- 2006–2016 - 1100 metres
- 2017 onwards - 1200 metres

== Winners ==
The following are past winners of the race.

- 2026 - Grafterburners
- 2025 - Rothfire
- 2024 - Overpass
- 2023 - I Am Me
- 2022 - Rocketing By
- 2021 - Big Parade
- 2020 - Trumbull
- 2019 - Deprive
- 2018 - Pierata
- 2017 - In Her Time
- 2016 - Spieth
- 2015 - Dothraki
- 2014 - Deep Field
- 2013 - Famous Seamus
- 2012 - Famous Seamus
- 2011 - Title
- 2010 - Whitefriars
- 2009 - News Alert
- 2008 - Keen Commander
- 2007 - ‘Race Not Run’
- 2006 - Uber
- 2005 - Vionneto
- 2004 - Sam Sung A Song
- 2003 - Shogun Lodge
- 2002 - National Saint
- 2001 - ^ Pastime / Strabane
- 2000 - Cosset
- 1999 - Nan Tien
- 1998 - Mutombo
- 1997 - Ossie Cossie
- 1996 - Identikit
- 1995 - Sword
- 1994 - Roanoke Boy
- 1993 - Legal Agent
- 1992 - Classic Magic
- 1991 - All Archie
- 1990 - West Dancer
- 1989 - Diamond Benny
- 1988 - Diamond Benny
- 1987 - Dream Faith
- 1986 - Let Me Tell
- 1985 - Bemboka Spirit
- 1984 - Vain Karioi
- 1983 - Solo Lad
- 1982 - Berlainsky
- 1981 - Trench Digger
- 1980 - Royal Treatment
- 1979 - Dream Mascot
- 1978 - War Chariot
- 1977 - King’s Favourite
- 1976 - ‘Race Not Run’
- 1975 - Top Charger
- 1974 - Just James
- 1973 - Kista
- 1972 - Roadwise
- 1971 - Hellbent
- 1970 - Royal Treat
- 1969 - Grey Court
- 1968 - Academy Star

^ Dead heat

== See also ==
- Angst Stakes
- The Everest
- King Charles III Stakes
- The Kosciuszko
- Reginald Allen Quality
- St Leger Stakes
- List of Australian Group races
- Group races
