= Let's Elope Stakes =

- Class: Group 2
- Location: Flemington Racecourse
- Inaugurated: 1987
- Race type: Thoroughbred
- Sponsor: Asahi (2026)

Race information
- Distance: 1,400 metres
- Surface: Turf
- Track: Left-handed
- Qualification: Mares four years old and older that are not maidens
- Weight: Set weights with penalties
- Purse: A$300,000 (2026)

The Let's Elope Stakes is a Victoria Racing Club Group 2 Thoroughbred horse race for mares aged four years old and upwards, run at set weights with penalties, over a distance of 1400 metres, held annually at Flemington Racecourse, Melbourne, Australia in September.

== History ==
In 1994 the race was renamed in honour of the former champion and 1991 Melbourne Cup winner, Let's Elope.

=== Name ===
- 1987–1993 - Milady Stakes
- 1994 onwards - Let’s Elope Stakes

=== Grade ===
- 1987–2004 - Listed Race
- 2005–2008 - Group 3 race
- 2009 onwards - Group 2 race

== Winners ==
The following are past winners of the race.

- 2026 - Pondalowie
- 2025 - Lazzura
- 2024 - Grinzinger Belle
- 2023 - Amelia's Jewel
- 2022 - Kissonallforcheeks
- 2021 - Turaath
- 2020 - Pretty Brazen
- 2019 - Spanish Whisper
- 2018 - I Am A Star
- 2017 - Sword Of Light
- 2016 - Don't Doubt Mamma
- 2015 - Amicus
- 2014 - Commanding Jewel
- 2013 - Commanding Jewel
- 2012 - Zurella
- 2011 - Pinker Pinker
- 2010 - No Evidence Needed
- 2009 - Cats Whisker
- 2008 - Mimi Lebrock
- 2007 - Devil Moon
- 2006 - Rewaaya
- 2005 - Dea
- 2004 - Beautiful Gem
- 2003 - Ain’t Seen Nothin’
- 2002 - Purple Groove
- 2001 - Flushed
- 2000 - Tickle My
- 1999 - Zapeace
- 1998 - Skyrocket
- 1997 - Derobe
- 1996 - Rose Of Portland
- 1995 - Tolanda
- 1994 - Amuse Us
- 1993 - Rose of Marizza
- 1992 - Mannerism
- 1991 - Shavano Miss
- 1990 - Natural Wonder
- 1989 - Rancheetah
- 1988 - Riva Gleam
- 1987 - Take My Picture

== See also ==
- Bobbie Lewis Quality
- Lexus Archer Stakes
- Makybe Diva Stakes
- List of Australian Group races
- Group races
