= Dixie Blossoms =

Australian Thoroughbred racehorse

- Sire: Street Sense
- Grandsire: Street Cry
- Dam: Whistle Dixie
- Damsire: Star Way
- Sex: Mare
- Foaled: 2 November 2012
- Country: Australia
- Colour: Bay
- Breeder: Alan Osburg
- Owner: Alan Osburg
- Trainer: Ron Quinton
- Record: 32: 7–7–7
- Earnings: A$ 1,583,910

Major wins
- Angst Stakes (2016, 2017); Guy Walter Stakes (2017, 2018); Coolmore Classic (2019)

Awards
- NSW Queen of the Autumn (2019)

Dixie Blossoms (foaled 2 November 2012) is a Group 1 winning Australian thoroughbred racehorse.

== Background ==
Dixie Blossoms was bred and owned by Alan Osburg, the former owner of Champion stallion Exceed and Excel.

== Racing career ==
Dixie Blossoms was twice the winner of the Angst Stakes and the Guy Walter Stakes. She achieved success in a Group 1 race for the first time in 7 attempts when successful at the odds of 20/1 in the 2019 Coolmore Classic, winning by a margin of 2.5 lengths.

== Pedigree ==
Pedigree of Dixie Blossoms (AUS) 2012
| Sire Street Sense (USA) 2004 | Street Cry (IRE); 1998 | Machiavellian | Mr. Prospector |
| Sire Street Sense (USA) 2004 | Street Cry (IRE); 1998 | Machiavellian | Coup de Folie |
| Sire Street Sense (USA) 2004 | Street Cry (IRE); 1998 | Helen Street | Troy |
| Sire Street Sense (USA) 2004 | Street Cry (IRE); 1998 | Helen Street | Waterway |
| Sire Street Sense (USA) 2004 | Bedazzle (USA); 1997 | Dixieland Band | Northern Dancer |
| Sire Street Sense (USA) 2004 | Bedazzle (USA); 1997 | Dixieland Band | Mississippi Mud |
| Sire Street Sense (USA) 2004 | Bedazzle (USA); 1997 | Majestic Legend | His Majesty |
| Sire Street Sense (USA) 2004 | Bedazzle (USA); 1997 | Majestic Legend | Long Legend |
| Dam Whistle Dixie (NZ) 2003 | Star Way (GB); 1977 | Star Appeal | Appiani |
| Dam Whistle Dixie (NZ) 2003 | Star Way (GB); 1977 | Star Appeal | Sterna |
| Dam Whistle Dixie (NZ) 2003 | Star Way (GB); 1977 | New Way | Klairon |
| Dam Whistle Dixie (NZ) 2003 | Star Way (GB); 1977 | New Way | New Move |
| Dam Whistle Dixie (NZ) 2003 | Proteaceae (NZ); 1993 | Kaapstad | Sir Tristram |
| Dam Whistle Dixie (NZ) 2003 | Proteaceae (NZ); 1993 | Kaapstad | Eight Carat |
| Dam Whistle Dixie (NZ) 2003 | Proteaceae (NZ); 1993 | Gone With The Wind | Light Wind |
| Dam Whistle Dixie (NZ) 2003 | Proteaceae (NZ); 1993 | Gone With The Wind | Net Chord |
