= Guy Walter Stakes =

Guy Walter Stakes registered as Wiggle Stakes
- Class: Group 2
- Location: Randwick Racecourse, Sydney, Australia
- Inaugurated: 1996 (Listed race)
- Race type: Thoroughbred
- Sponsor: Proven Thoroughbreds (2018-2026)

Race information
- Distance: 1,400 metres
- Surface: Turf
- Track: Right-handed
- Qualification: Mares four years old and older
- Weight: Set weights with penalties
- Purse: $300,000 (2026)

The Guy Walter Stakes, registered as the Wiggle Stakes, is an Australian Turf Club Group 2 Thoroughbred horse race, for mares aged four-years-old and upwards, over a distance of 1400 metres at Randwick Racecourse in Sydney, Australia in late February or early March.

== History ==
The Registered Race is named after champion mare Wiggle, who was a champion two-year-old and three-year-old (1958–59) and also later went on to win in the USA.

The current race name is named after the trainer Guy Walter (1954–2014), who trained 36 Group One winners and his horses won more than 120 stakes races for around $40 million in prize money.

Gai Waterhouse trained the race winenrs in 2001, 2003, 2005, 2010 and with Adrian Bott in 2024.

=== Name ===
- 1996–1999 - Wiggle Quality Handicap
- 2000–2004 - Wiggle Fillies and Mares Quality Handicap
- 2005–2011 - Wiggle Quality Handicap
- 2012–2014 - Wiggle Stakes
- 2015 onwards - Guy Walter Stakes

=== Grade ===
- 1996–2013 - Listed race
- 2014–2015 - Group 3
- 2016 onwards - Group 2

=== Venue ===
- 1996–2001 - Warwick Farm Racecourse
- 2002–2004 - Randwick Racecourse
- 2005–2015 - Warwick Farm Racecourse
- 2016 onwards - Randwick Racecourse

=== Conditions ===
- Prior to 2005 the race was for three year old fillies and older mares.
- From 2012 onwards the race has set weights with penalties conditions.

== Winners ==
The following are past winners of the race.

- 2026 - Verona Rose
- 2025 - Amelia's Jewel
- 2024 - Hell Hath No Fury
- 2023 - Hope In Your Heart
- 2022 - Forbidden Love
- 2021 - Krone
- 2020 - Dawn Dawn
- 2019 - Alassio
- 2018 - Dixie Blossoms
- 2017 - Dixie Blossoms
- 2016 - Solicit
- 2015 - Danesiri
- 2014 - Catkins
- 2013 - Steps In Time
- 2012 - Steps In Time
- 2011 - Jersey Lily
- 2010 - Dane Julia
- 2009 - Hot Danish
- 2008 - Hot Danish
- 2007 - Doubting
- 2006 - Bhandara
- 2005 - Danni Martine
- 2004 - Gold Lottey
- 2003 - Forum Floozie
- 2002 - Youhadyourwarning
- 2001 - Corelli
- 2000 - Stella Maree
- 1999 - Bonanova
- 1998 - Sybeel
- 1997 - Timeless Winds
- 1996 - Destruct

== See also ==
- List of Australian Group races
- Group races
