= Gimcrack Stakes (PR) =

- Class: Group 3
- Location: Ascot Racecourse, Perth, Western Australia
- Inaugurated: 1978 (Principal Race)
- Race type: Thoroughbred
- Sponsor: Swan Draught (2025 & 2026)

Race information
- Distance: 1,100 metres
- Surface: Turf
- Qualification: Two year old fillies
- Weight: Set weights with penalties
- Purse: $200,000 (2026)

The Gimcrack Stakes is a Perth Racing Group 3 Thoroughbred horse race for two-year-old fillies, run at set weights with penalties, over a distance of 1100 metres at Ascot Racecourse, Perth, Western Australia in March.

== History ==
The event is named after Gimcrack, a successful English racehorse in the 18th century. Gimcrack won twenty-seven times in a career of thirty-six races.
The race is a preparatory race for the highly regarded Karrakatta Plate held a couple of weeks later. Usually the winner will be entered in the event.

=== Name ===
In 1983 the race was run as the Toyota Stakes.

=== Distance ===
- 1978–1998 - 5 furlongs (~1000 metres)
- 1999–2004 – 1100 metres
- 2005 – 1200 metres
- 2006 onwards - 1100 metres

=== Grade ===
- 1978 - Principal Race
- 1979–2014 - Listed Race
- 2015 onwards - Group 3

=== Venue ===
- In 2005 the race was run at Belmont Park Racecourse.

== Winners ==
The following are past winners of the race.

- 2026 - Aurum Belle
- 2025 - Talkanco
- 2023 - Live To Tell
- 2024 - Bel Merci
- 2022 - Amelia's Jewel
- 2021 - Hoi An
- 2020 - Starfield Impact
- 2019 - Rio Del Mar
- 2018 - Agent Pippa
- 2017 - Kiss Bang Love
- 2016 - Whispering Brook
- 2015 - Chantski
- 2014 - Fuld's Bet
- 2013 - Camporella
- 2012 - Darlington Abbey
- 2011 - Flying Affair
- 2010 - Miss Condition
- 2009 - For Your Eyes Only
- 2008 - Danerip
- 2007 - Jestatune
- 2006 - Paris Petard
- 2005 - Sportivo
- 2004 - Refemme
- 2003 - Diamond Dash
- 2002 - Amphritite
- 2001 - Magic Heaven
- 2000 - Ebony Magic
- 1999 - Lady Belgrave
- 1998 - Terevega
- 1997 - ‡race not held
- 1996 - Most Secret
- 1995 - Western Zip
- 1994 - Our Cutey
- 1993 - City Jewel
- 1992 - Pluton
- 1991 - Enchanted Angel
- 1990 - Backpak
- 1989 - Playtoss
- 1988 - Hold That Smile
- 1987 - Sovereign Lady
- 1986 - Frown
- 1985 - Haulpress
- 1984 - Getting There
- 1983 - Scornvale
- 1982 - Just Rumours
- 1981 - Lady Sculptor
- 1980 - ¶Almenahtra / Scarlet Pearl
- 1979 - Born Rich
- 1978 - ¶Elegant Shell / Priority Road

¶ The event was run in divisions
‡ Race moved in the WATC racing calendar forward from late spring (November) to autumn (March) of 1998

== See also ==
- Roma Cup
- WA Oaks
- Gimcrack Stakes (ATC)
- Gimcrack Stakes (England)
- List of Australian Group races
- Group races
