= Overpass (horse) =

Australian thoroughbred racehorse

- Sire: Vancouver
- Dam: Walkway
- Damsire: Exceed and Excel
- Sex: Gelding
- Foaled: 2018
- Country: Australia
- Colour: Bay
- Owner: Darby Racing
- Trainer: Bjorn Baker
- Record: 29: 10-5-0
- Earnings: A$9,752,000

Major wins
- Expressway Stakes (2022); The Quokka (2023, 2024); Winterbottom Stakes (2023, 2024); Sydney Stakes (2024)

Overpass is a two-time Group 1 winning Australian Thoroughbred racehorse.

He has achieved notable success in 1200m sprint races, winning the 2023 and 2024 editions of The Quokka and the Winterbottom Stakes. He also has victories in the Expressway Stakes and the Sydney Stakes.

== Background ==
Overpass is a bay gelding foaled in 2018 and trained by Bjorn Baker in Sydney, owned by Darby Racing. He is sired by Vancouver out of the mare Walkway, whose damsire is Exceed and Excel.
