= Gimcrack Stakes (ATC) =

- Class: Group 3
- Location: Randwick Racecourse, Sydney, Australia
- Inaugurated: 1906
- Race type: Thoroughbred - flat
- Sponsor: Keeneland (2026)

Race information
- Distance: 1,000 metres
- Surface: Turf
- Track: Right-handed
- Qualification: Two year old fillies
- Weight: Set weights – 56kg
- Purse: A$250,000 (2026)

The Gimcrack Stakes is an Australian Turf Club Group 3 Thoroughbred horse race, for two-year-old fillies, held with set weight conditions, over a distance of 1000 metres at Randwick Racecourse in Sydney, Australia in early October. Total prize money for the race is A$250,000.

== History ==
=== Name ===
The event is named after Gimcrack, a successful English racehorse in the 18th century. Gimcrack won twenty-seven times in a career of thirty-six races. Along with the Breeders' Plate these are the first two year old races in the New South Wales racing season. Starters in these event must participate in trials a couple of weeks before these event to gain acceptance.

=== 1942 racebook ===
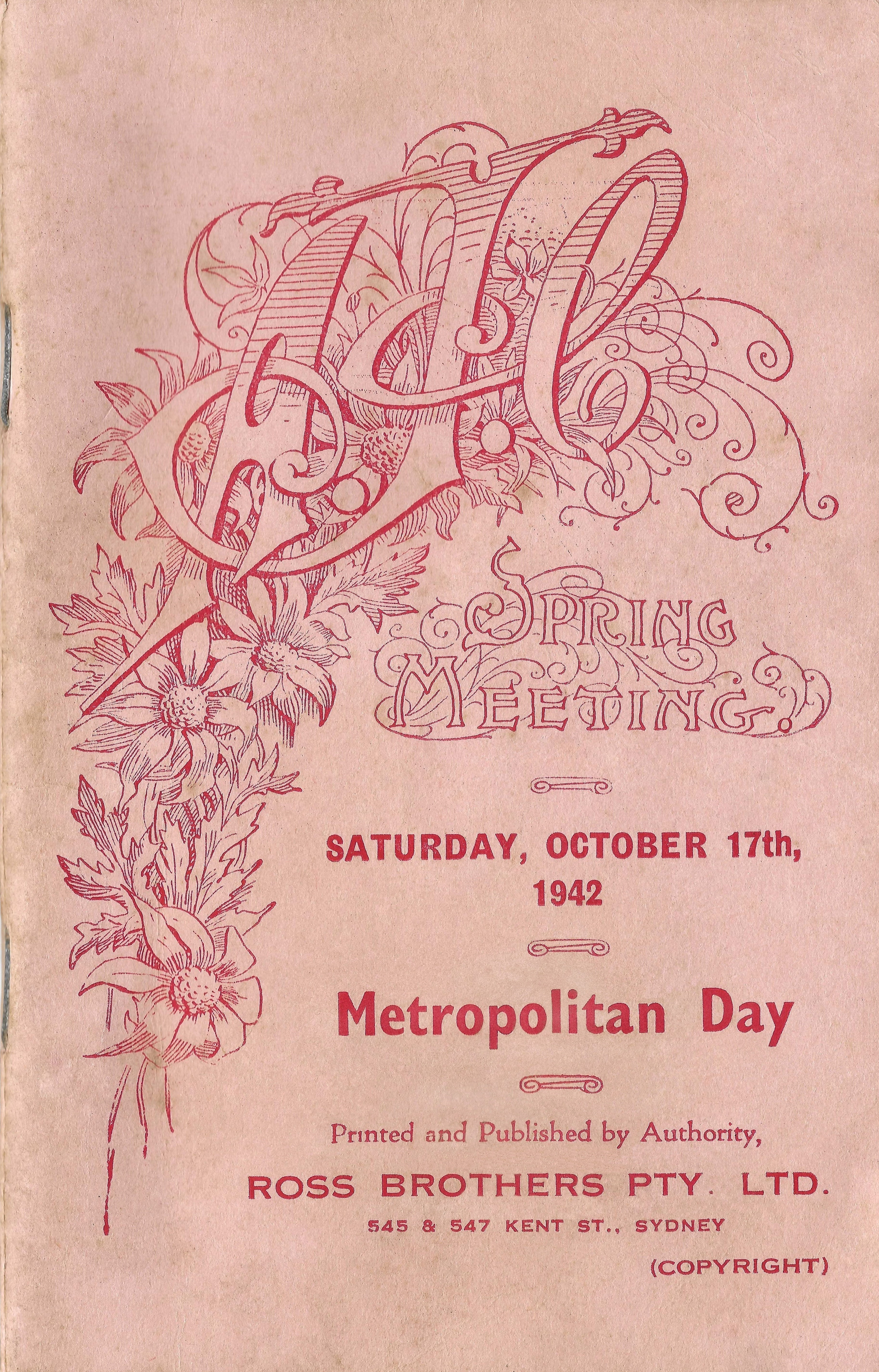
1942 AJC Gimcrack Stakes racebook front cover

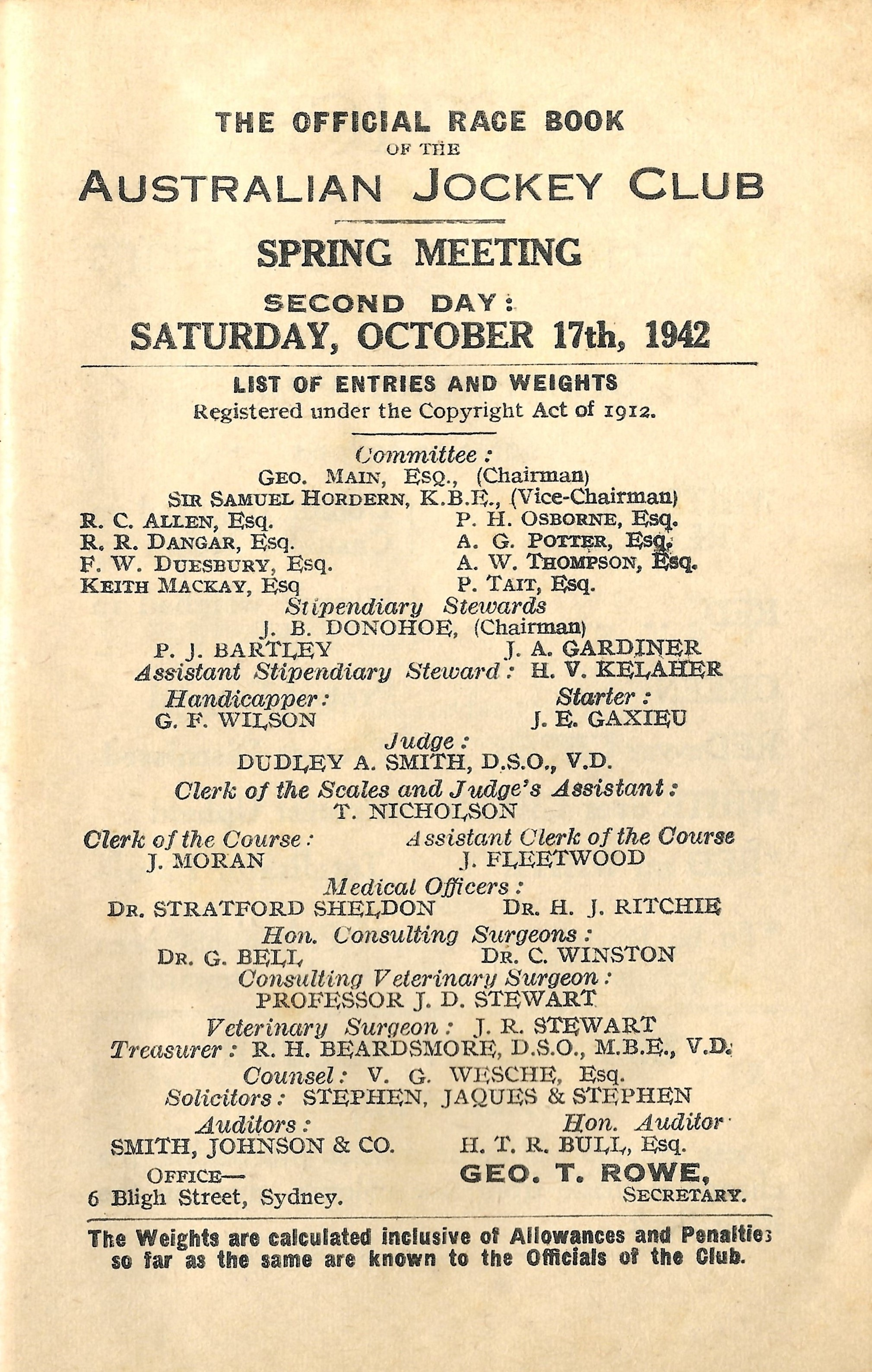
1942 AJC Gimcrack Stakes raceday officials

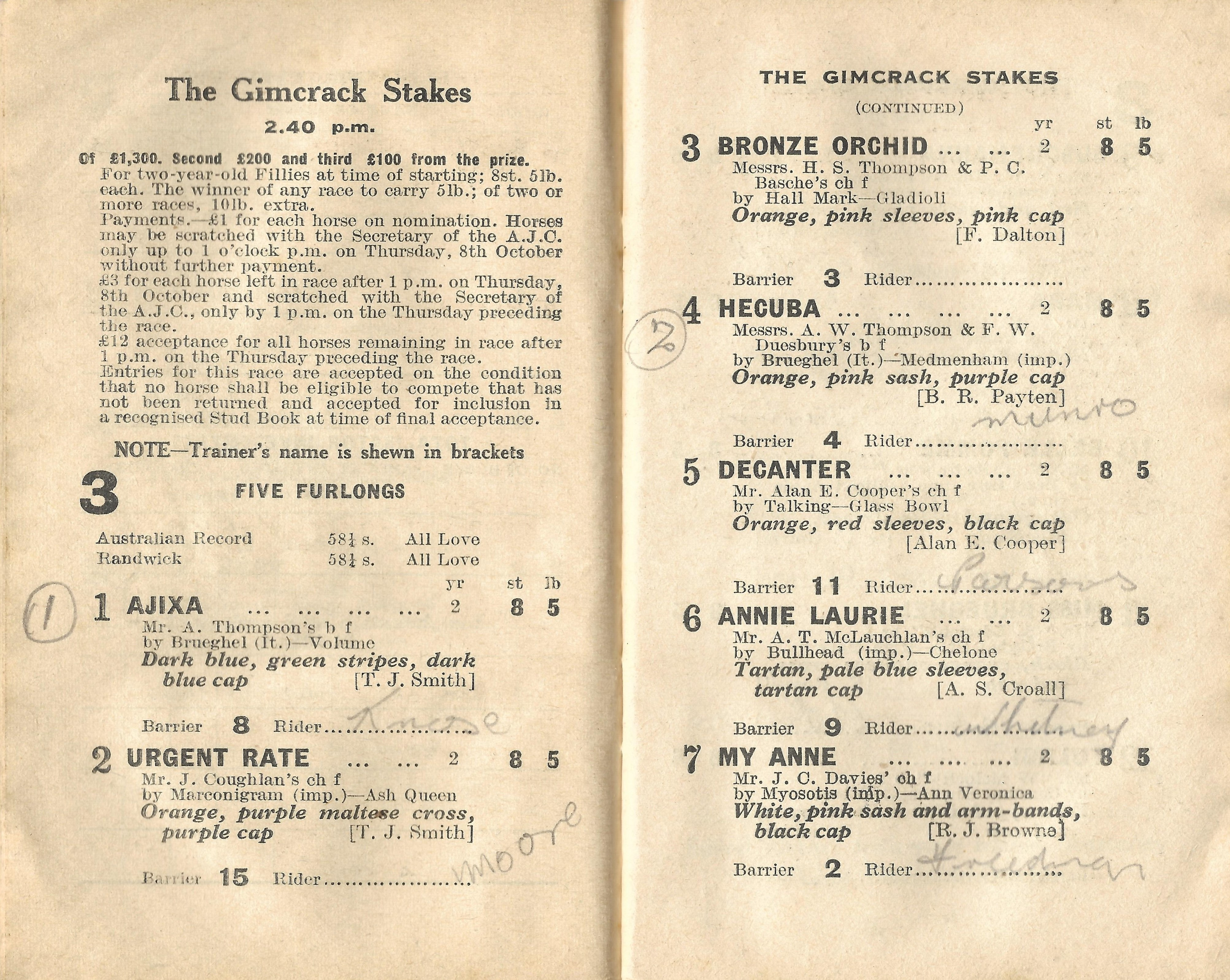
1942 AJC Gimcrack Stakes showing the winner, Ajixa

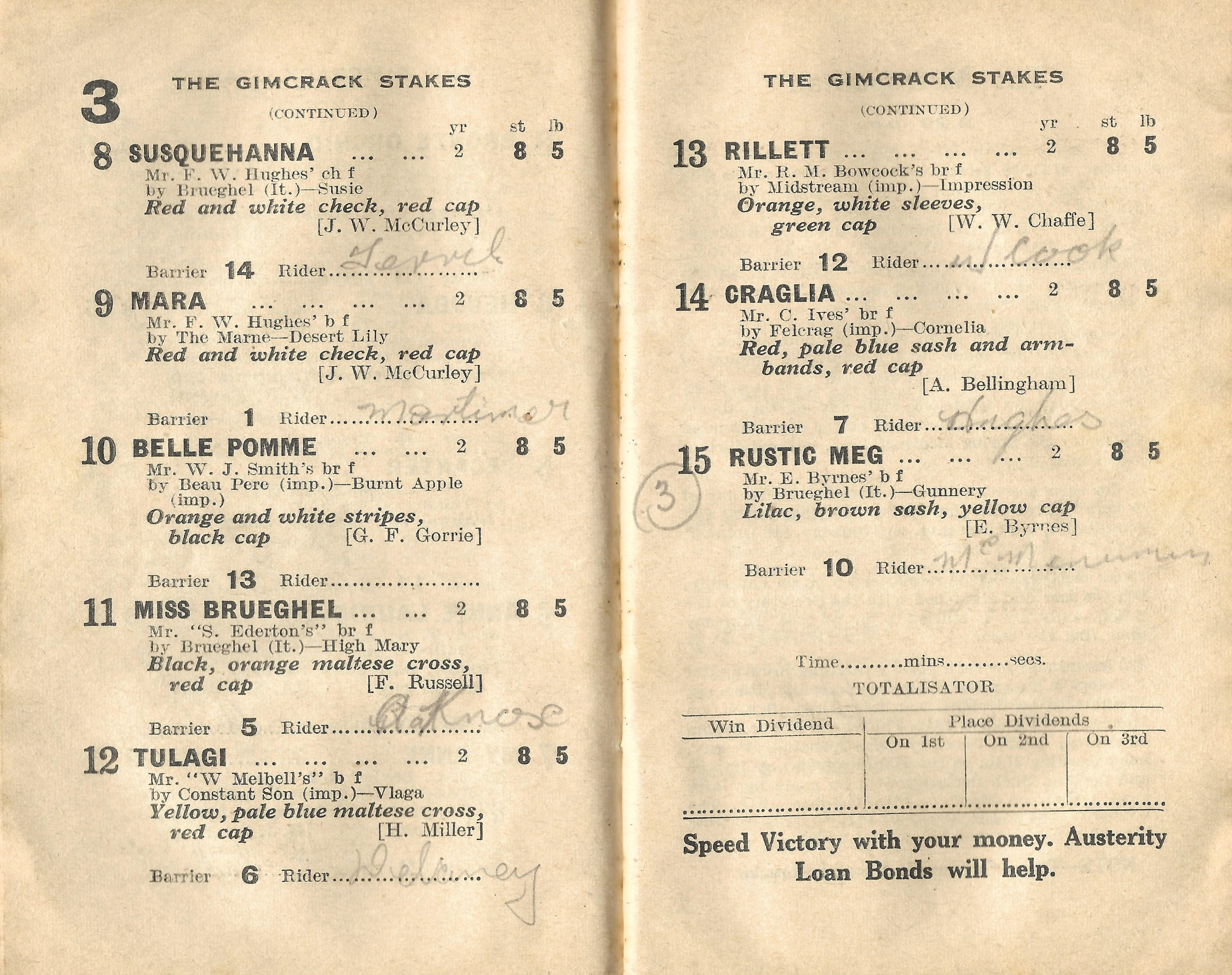
1942 AJC Gimcrack Stakes starters and results

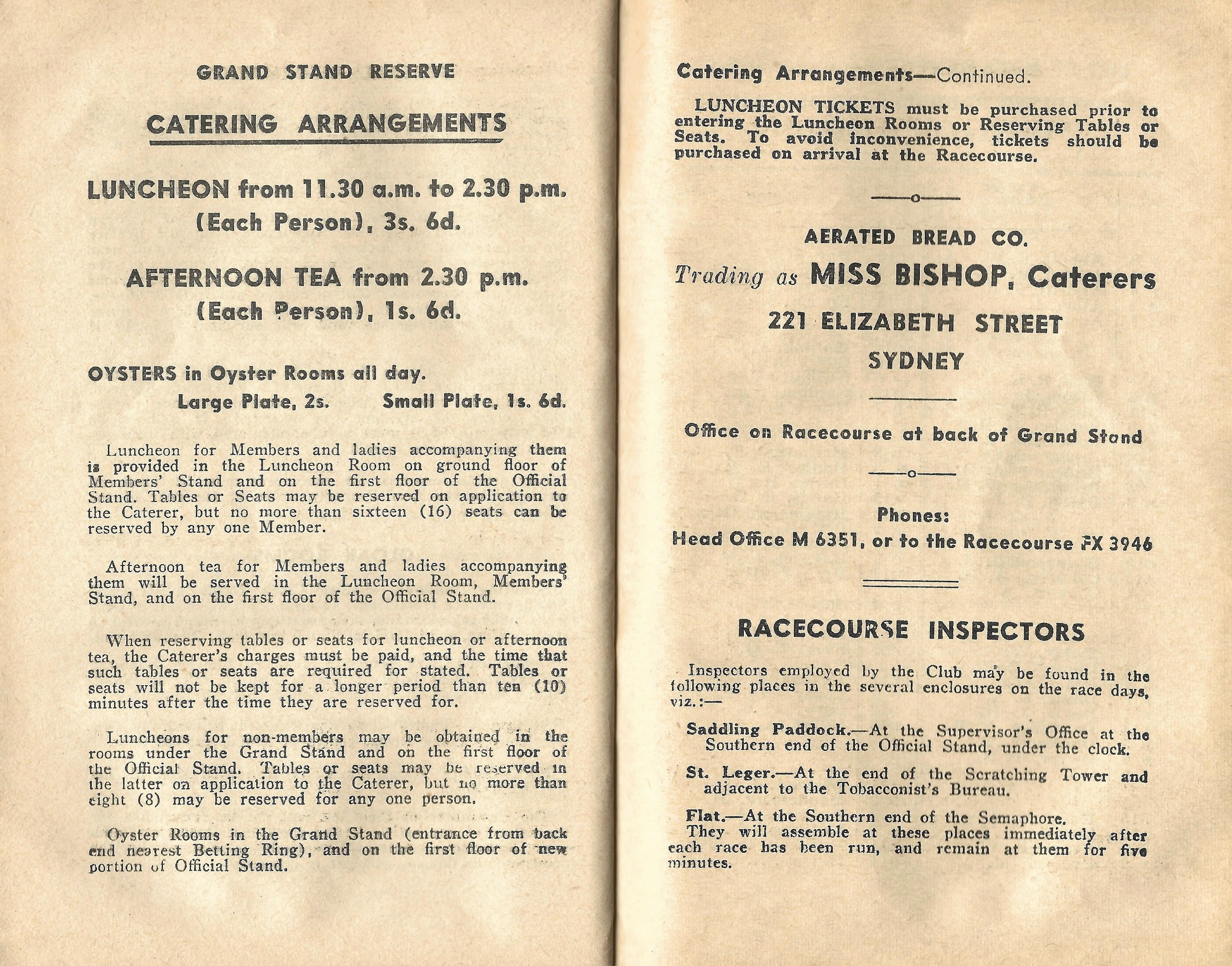
1942 AJC Gimcrack Stakes catering arrangements

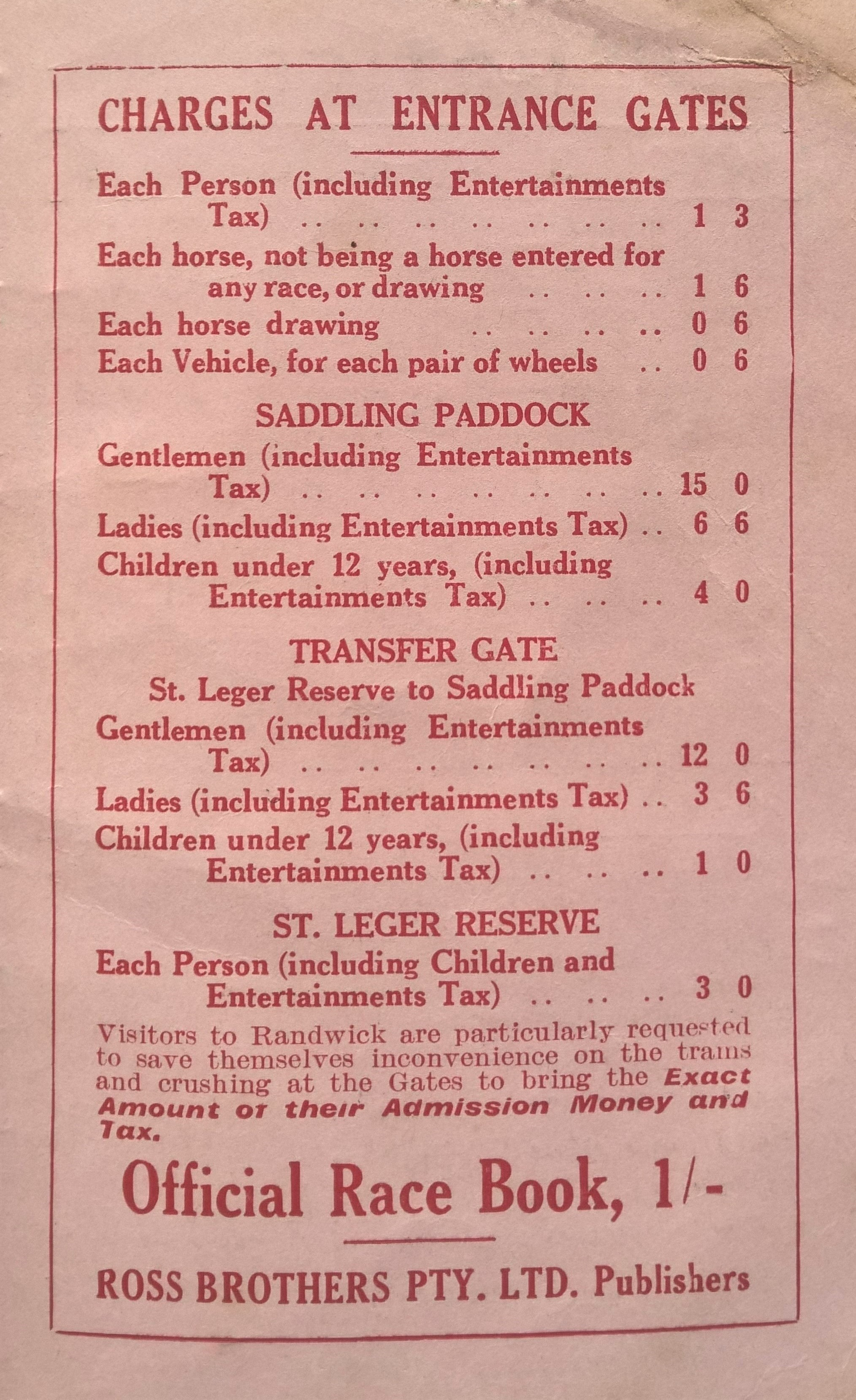
Back cover charges at the entrance gates

=== Distance ===
- 1906–1972 - 5 furlongs (~1000 metres)
- 1973–2007 – 1000 metres
- 2008 – 1100 metres
- 2019 onwards - 1000 metres

=== Grade ===
- 1906–1978 - Principal Race
- 1979–1991 - Group 3
- 1992–2018 - Listed Race
- 2019 onwards - Group 3

=== Venue ===
- 1983, 2001 - Warwick Farm Racecourse

== Winners ==
- 2026 - Shraddha
- 2025 - Shiki
- 2024 - Bel Merci
- 2023 - Manual
- 2022 - Platinum Jubilee
- 2021 - Coolangatta
- 2020 - Enthaar
- 2019 - Every Rose
- 2018 - Catch Me
- 2017 - Satin Slipper
- 2016 - Jorda
- 2015 - Calliope
- 2014 - Calaverite
- 2013 - Alpha Miss
- 2012 - Brilliant Bisc
- 2011 - Hussousa
- 2010 - Defiant Dame
- 2009 - Gybe
- 2008 Oct. - Our Joan Of Arc
- 2008 Mar. - Portillo
- 2007 - ‡race not held and postponed to 1 March 2008
- 2006 - Hurried Choice
- 2005 - Mirror Mirror
- 2004 - Media
- 2003 - Segments
- 2002 - Spurcent
- 2001 - De Lollies
- 2000 - Donna Natalia
- 1999 - Speedy Bell
- 1998 - Katima
- 1997 - Crimson Flight
- 1996 - Dantelah
- 1995 - Apple Danish
- 1994 - Millie
- 1993 - Warning Siren
- 1992 - Fitting
- 1991 - Watch
- 1990 - Marskin
- 1989 - Kincay
- 1988 - Screen Idol
- 1987 - Startling Lass
- 1986 - Mother Duck
- 1985 - Dream's Delight
- 1984 - Dandolera
- 1983 - Coming Closer
- 1982 - Belle Tetue
- 1981 - Vaindarra
- 1980 - Black Shoes
- 1979 - Fiancee
- 1978 - Silver Mystic
- 1977 - ♯Spanish Yacht / Trimaran
- 1976 - ♯Rainy Day / Princess Talaria
- 1975 - ♯Fleet Princess / Schemer
- 1974 - Intriguing
- 1973 - Sufficient
- 1972 - Lady Lido
- 1971 - Light Praise
- 1970 - My Amazon
- 1969 - Fleet Royal
- 1968 - Natal Lass
- 1967 - Miss Pola
- 1966 - Ruling Ways
- 1965 - Port Joy
- 1964 - Fawnia
- 1963 - Attentive
- 1962 - Megalong
- 1961 - Jan's Image
- 1960 - Courteous
- 1959 - Wenona Girl
- 1958 - Endure
- 1957 - Andabri
- 1956 - Concert Star
- 1955 - Sajax
- 1954 - Ultrablue
- 1953 - Seofon
- 1952 - Love To All
- 1951 - Cultured
- 1950 - Merrie Merton
- 1949 - Mighty Song
- 1948 - Rhumba
- 1947 - Midwise
- 1946 - Nechi
- 1945 - Sweet Chime
- 1944 - Civic Pride
- 1943 - Scaur Fel
- 1942 - Ajixa
- 1941 - Hesione
- 1940 - ll Love
- 1939 - Trueness
- 1938 - Merry Smile
- 1937 - Gay Romance
- 1936 - Record
- 1935 - Spirits
- 1934 - Lady Primrose
- 1933 - Visage
- 1932 - Leila Vale
- 1931 - Precious Gif
- 1930 - Bassanton
- 1929 - Trenette
- 1928 - Malvina
- 1927 - Belle Gallante
- 1926 - Eulalie
- 1925 - Kanooka
- 1924 - Chignon
- 1923 - Periwoo
- 1922 - Princess Dighton
- 1921 - Lady Aura
- 1920 - Furious
- 1919 - Delight
- 1918 - Sue
- 1917 - Sweet Lady
- 1916 - Manna
- 1915 - Eulacre
- 1914 - Starland
- 1913 - Woorak
- 1912 - Beragoon
- 1911 - Ventura
- 1910 - Respect
- 1909 - Gigandra
- 1908 - Nandillyan Maid
- 1907 - Armlet
- 1906 - Maltine

♯ Run in divisions
‡ Not held because of outbreak of equine influenza

== See also ==
- Gimcrack Stakes (PR)
- List of Australian Group races
- Group races
