= Ascot Racecourse (Western Australia) =

Horse racing venue in Perth, Western Australia

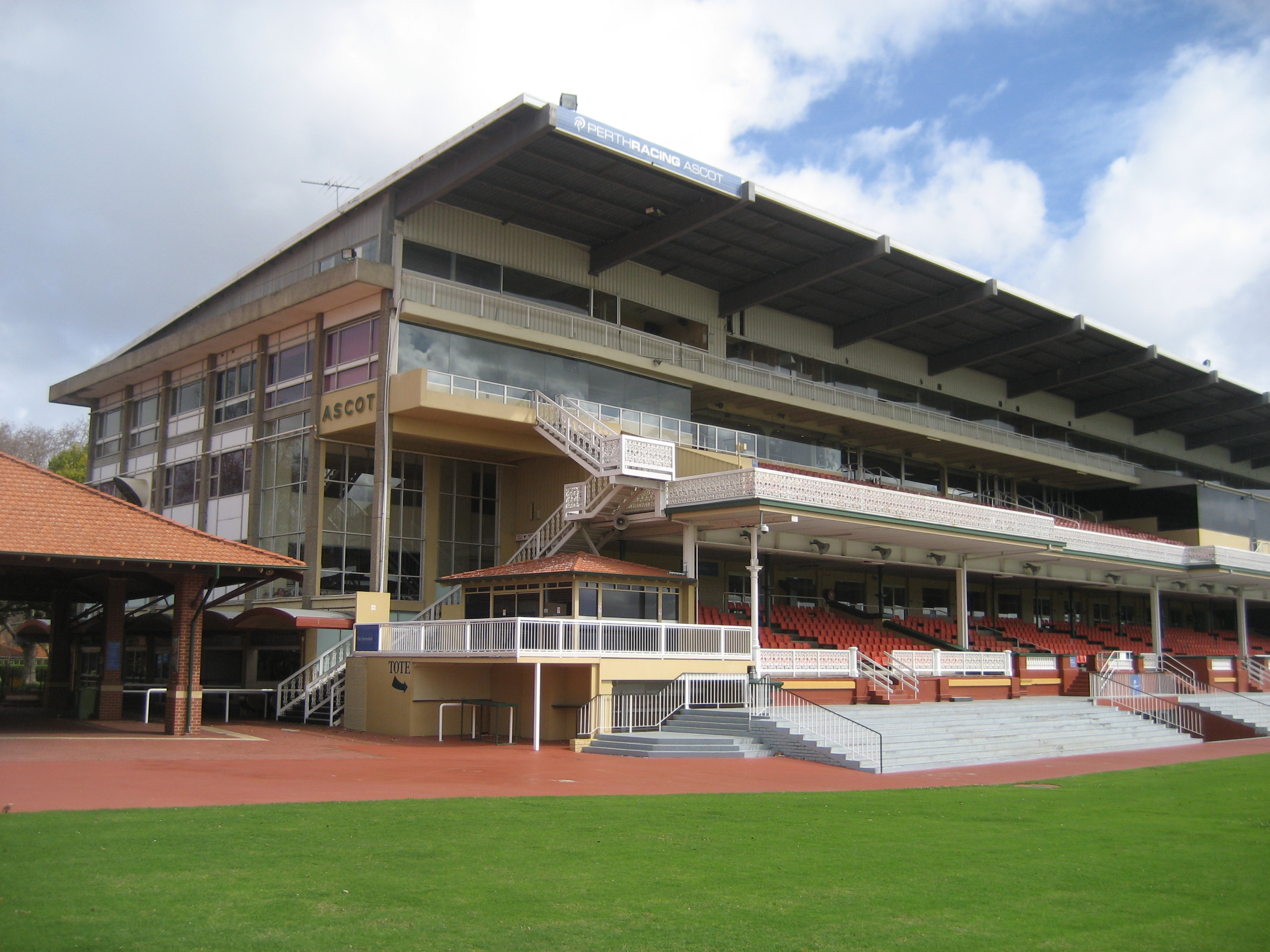
- Ascot grandstand
- Interactive map of Ascot Racecourse
- Location: Ascot, Western Australia
- Coordinates: 31°56′06″S 115°55′30″E
- Operated by: Perth Racing
- Date opened: March 1848; 178 years ago
- Screened on: Seven Network
- Race type: Flat
- Course type: Tri-oval
- Notable races: Kingston Town Classic; Railway Stakes; Winterbottom Stakes; Perth Cup

Ascot Racecourse is the major racecourse in Perth, Western Australia, situated approximately 8 kilometres (5.0 mi) east of the Perth central business district, with the headquarters of the Perth Racing positioned directly opposite.

The racecourse has a 2-kilometre (1.2 mi) turf track with a 300-metre (980 ft) inclined finishing straight.

== History ==
In 1848 a race meeting was held on J. W. Hardey's "Grove Farm" alongside the Swan River. Soon afterwards a site was selected for a permanent course on Hardey's property – this became the Perth Race Course (later Ascot Racecourse). In 1852, the West Australian Turf Club was formed.

The inaugural Perth Cup was held in 1887. In 1885 a railway was constructed to the northern side of Swan River opposite the racecourse. The railway was extended across the river to the racecourse in 1897. The railway and station were removed in 1957.

== Races ==
The following is a list of Group races which are run at Ascot Racecourse.

Grp	Race name	Age	Sex	Weight	Distance	Date
1	Northerly Stakes (Note: Prior to 2022 was called the Kingston Town Classic.)	3YO+	Open	wfa	1800	December
1	Railway Stakes	3YO+	Open	hcp	1600	November
1	Winterbottom Stakes	3YO+	Open	wfa	1200	November
2	Karrakatta Plate	2YO	Open	sw	1200	March
2	Lee Steere Stakes	3YO+	Open	wfa	1400	November
2	Perth Cup	3YO+	Open	hcp	2400	January
2	Ted Van Heemst Stakes	3YO+	Open	wfa	2100	December
2	WATC Derby	3YO	Open	sw	2400	April
2	WA Guineas	3YO	Open	sw	1600	November
3	Asian Beau Stakes	3YO+	Open	hcp	1400	October
3	Colonel Reeves Stakes	3YO+	Open	hcp	1100	November
3	Eurythmic Stakes (Note: Prior to 2022 was called the Northerly Stakes.)	3YO+	Open	wfa	1400	October
3	Gimcrack Stakes	2YO	Fillies	sw	1100	March
3	La Trice Classic	3YO+	Open	sw	1800	January
3	Prince Of Wales Stakes	3YO+	Open	wfa	1200	October
3	R J Peters Stakes	3YO+	Open	hcp	1500	November
3	Roma Cup	Open	Open	wfa	1200	May/June
3	The Gold Rush	3YO+	Open	wfa	1400	December
3	WA Champion Fillies Stakes	3YO	Fillies	sw	1600	November
3	WA Oaks	3YO	Fillies	sw	2400	March
3	WATC Sires Produce	2YO	Open	sw	1400	April
L	Lee Steere Classic	3YO	Open	sw	1400	December
S (Note: The Quokka is held under Special Conditions and is not considered a Group race.)	The Quokka	2YO+	Open	wfa	1200	April

=== Key ===
- hcp - handicap
- sw - set weights
- wfa - weight for age

== Culture ==
The Perth Cup is Perth's feature event on the racing calendar held annually either on New Year's Day or a nearby Saturday.

== See also ==
- Belmont Park, Perth Racing's alternate season track to Ascot.
- Ascot Racecourse in the United Kingdom.
