= Western Australian Turf Club =

Horse racing organisation in Western Australia

The Western Australian Turf Club (WATC), later known as Perth Racing, is a members club in Perth, Western Australia.

It was established in the 19th century during the colonial period, was modelled after Turf Clubs in England, and operated as an elite social club. Since its inception it has been the primary administrator of Western Australia's horse racing sector. The club manages the Ascot Racecourse and Belmont Park Racecourse. Many of its racing-related functions were taken over by the body Racing and Wagering Western Australia in 2003.

The club was one of Perth's two most prominent members clubs in early Western Australia, along with the Weld Club. Many of its members were prominent families in the city's business and agricultural sectors, political or colonial elite, and successful professionals. Premier George Leake was the chairman until his death in 1902. Many parliamentarians around the time of Australia's federation were also members of either the Turf or Weld club.

== Publishing ==
- The Western Australian racing calendar. Perth, W.A : Western Australian Turf Club, 1890-1985.
- Racing calendar. Perth, W.A : Western Australian Turf Club, 1985-1999.
- Racing Western Australia. Belmont, W.A. : Western Australian Turf Club, 1999-2005.
