= Jack Holt (horse trainer) =

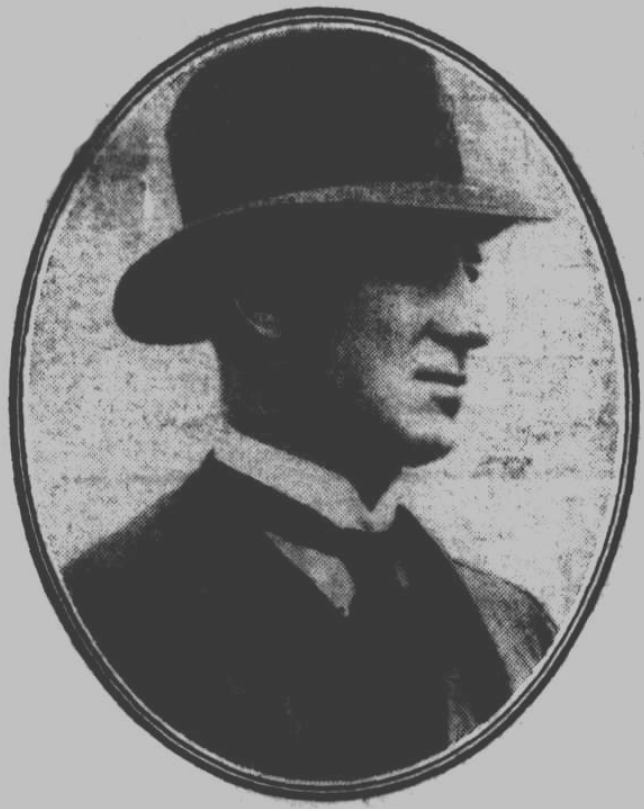
- Jack Holt (1922)
- Born: Michael Holt; 14 November 1879; Berwick, Victoria, Australia
- Died: 10 June 1951 (aged 71)
- Other names: "Wizard of Mordialloc"
- Occupations: horse trainer and philanthropist
- Spouse: unmarried
- Parents: Michael Holt (father); Mary Holt, née Corkery (mother)
- Awards: inducted, Australian Racing Hall of Fame (2001)

Michael "Jack" Holt (14 November 1879 – 10 June 1951) was an Australian horse trainer and philanthropist. Popularly known as the "Wizard of Mordialloc", Holt headed the Victorian trainers' premiership at least twelve times.

== Biography ==
Holt was born in Berwick, Victoria, a younger son of Michael Holt ( – 5 April 1910) and his wife Mary Holt, née Corkery (c. 1843 – 13 June 1913). He may have been christened "Michael" but called himself "Jackson", invariably shortened to "Jack". He lived with his two spinster sisters in the suburb of Mordialloc.

He first trained horses at Berwick, Victoria, and won his first race, the 1911 Standish Handicap, with his own mare, Carette.

Some of his more notable wins were:

- VRC Ascot Vale Stakes: Heroic (1924)
- AJC Breeders Plate: Heroic (1923)

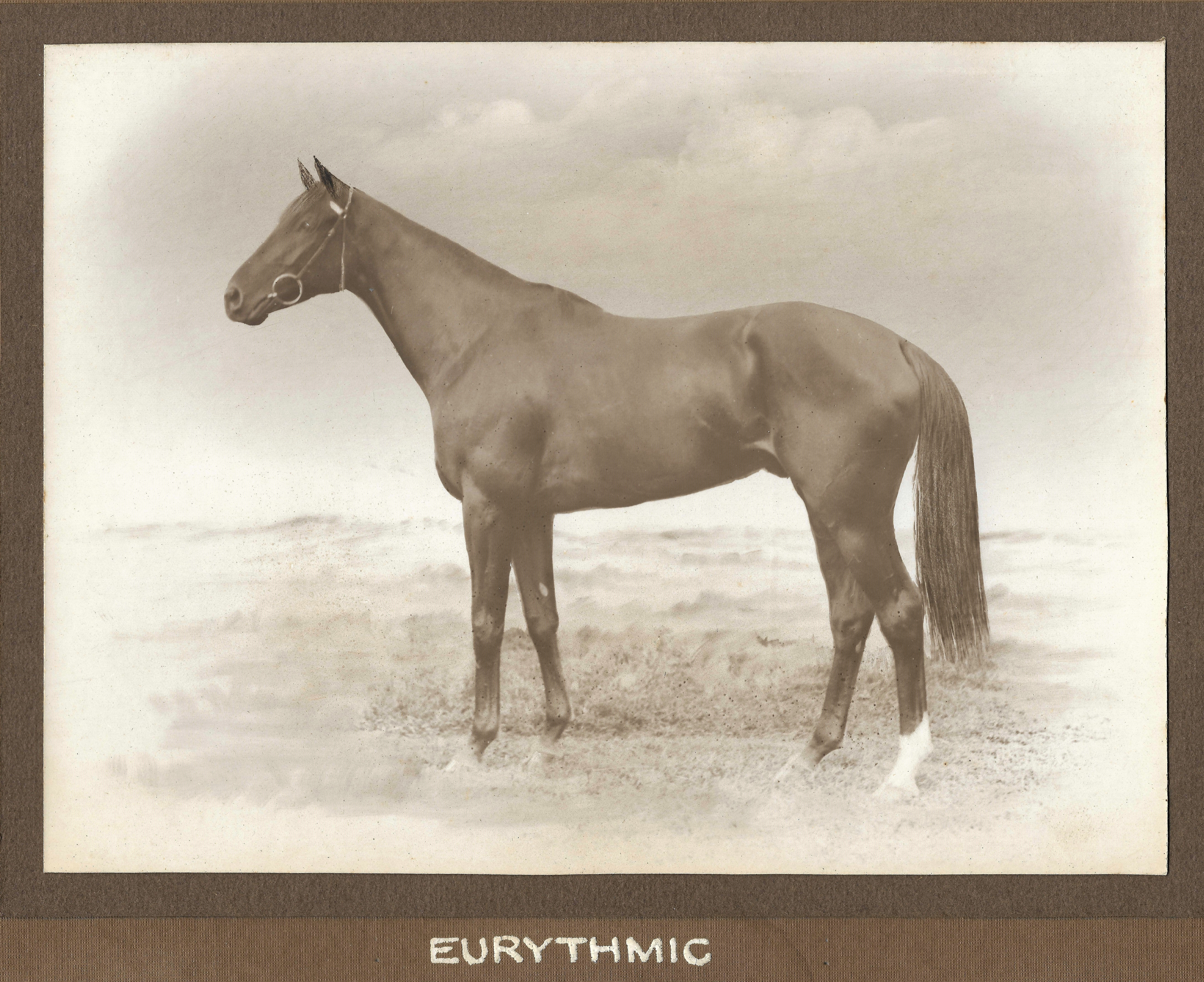
Eurythmic, 1921 Sydney Cup winner

- AJC Derby, later Australian Derby: Heroic (1924); Hall Mark (1933); Nuffield (1938); Reading (1939)
- Australian Steeple: Kinlark (1920) for J. M. Niall
- Bagot Handicap: Picatus (1934)
- Bill Stutt Stakes: Chanak (1947)
- Caulfield Cup 3 times: Eurythmic (1920) for E. Lee Steere; Maple (1928); High Syce (1929) for Mrs. L. R. Buxton
- Caulfield Guineas: Trice (1917); Heroic (1924); Young Idea (1935); Nuffield (1938)
- Caulfield Stakes 7 times: Eurythmic (1920, 1921 and 1922); Heroic (1925); Royal Charter (1927); High Syce (1929); Hall Mark (1934)
- AJC Champagne Stakes: Heroic (1924); Hall Mark (1933); Young Idea (1935)
- Chatsworth Plate: Noorilim (1919)
- Chelmsford Stakes: Heroic (1924)
- W. S. Cox Plate 6 times: Easingwold (1923); Heroic (1926); Hall Mark (1935); Young Idea (1936 and 1937); Chanak (1947)
- Futurity Stakes: Eurythmic (1922)
- Herbert Power Stakes: Tangalooma (1920); Eurythmic (1921); Easingwold (1923); Second Wind (1930)
- King's Cup (Hobart): Second Wind (1932) for E. Lee Steere
- VRC Maribyrnong Plate: Heroic (1923); Nuffield (1937)
- Melbourne Cup: Hall Mark (1933)
- Memsie Stakes 11 times: Eurythmic (1920, 1921 and 1922); Englefield (1924); Heroic (1925 and 1926); Royal Charter (1927); Highland (1929); High Brae (1932); Hall Mark (1935); Noble Prince (1946)
- Moonee Valley Cup: Telecles (1919); Royal Charter (1926)
- Newmarket Handicap: Blue Cross (1921); Heroic (1926); Mildura (1940)

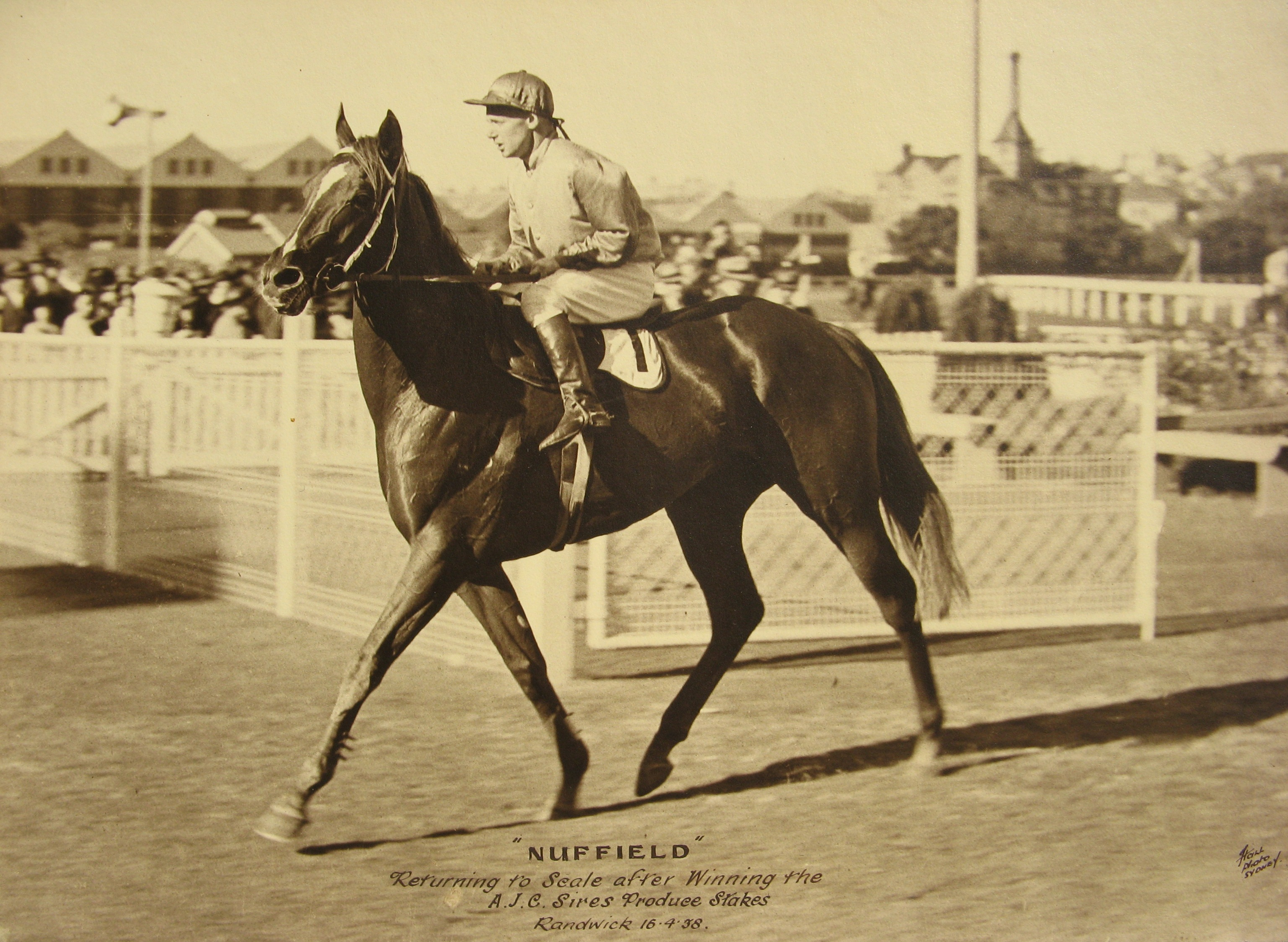
Nuffield, 1938 AJC Sires Produce winner

- ATC Sires' Produce Stakes Thrice (1917); Nuffield (1938) Chanak (1947)
- St Kilda Handicap: Second Wind (1930)
- Standish Handicap 8 times: Carette (1911); Blue Cross (1920 and 1921); Trice (1926) for Lady Stradbroke; Manrico (1939 and 1941)
- Sydney Cup: Eurythmic (1921); Lilypond (1925)
- Tullamarine Handicap: Second Wind (1929)
- V.R.C. Handicap: Second Wind (1929)
- Victoria Derby: Hall Mark (1933); Nuffield (1938)
- Underwood Stakes 7 times: Heroic (1926); Royal Charter (1927); Highland (1928 and 1929); Hall Mark (1933 and 1934)
- William Reid Stakes: Heroic (1927); Chanak (1948)
- Williamstown Cup: Tangalooma (1921); Second Wind (1930 and 1931)

Other horses he trained were: Avenger, Beau Fils, David, El Ray, Gallantic, Hyperion, Idea, King Pan, Man at Arms, Metellus, Radiant Lady, Royal Joker, Sailing Home, Sir Ibex, Smoke Bomb, Studio and Victorian King. His jockeys included Frank Dempsey, Theo Lewis and W. Duncan.

Holt was a devoted Catholic. When he died he was accorded a Requiem Mass at his local church, St. Brigid's, Mordialloc, to which he had been a faithful and generous adherent. His remains were interred in the Berwick Cemetery.

== Recognition ==
Holt was inducted into the Australian Racing Hall of Fame in 2001.

== Benefactions ==
Holt's estate was valued at something over £100,000, and most it was willed to charitable institutions:

- Establishment at St Vincent's Hospital, Melbourne, of a Medical Science Research Institute.
- St. Brigid's School received £1000 to continue funding the prizes at their annual picnic, a tradition begun by Holt many years before.
- A considerable sum was left in the care of his sister Madge Holt to be left on her death to be distributed to each of: Royal Melbourne Hospital, St. Vincent's Hospital, Alfred Hospital. Prince Henry Hospital, Children's Hospital, St. Joseph's Foundling Hospital, Little Sisters of the Poor, St. Anthony's Home, Caritas Christl Hospice for the Dying, Nazareth House, and Mercy Public Maternity Hospital. Holt had also made generous donations to these charities during his lifetime, as well as lending his name and influence to the running of fund-raising carnivals and annual billiard displays by Walter Lindrum.

== In popular culture ==
"Jack Holt" has been used in Australian rhyming slang as a synonym for "salt".

== Family ==
Michael Holt ( – 5 April 1910) was married to Mary Holt ( – 13 June 1913), who was born in County Cork.

- Margaret Mary "Madge" "Maggie" Holt ( – 14 May 1952) significant bequest to charities.
- William "Willie" Holt ( – )
- Jackson "Jack" Holt (c. 1880 – 10 June 1951) never married and lived at "Lethe", 8 Francis Street, Mordialloc, Victoria with his two sisters.
- Catherine "Kitty" Holt ( – 19 April 1945)
