= Clark & Robinson =

Australian stockbrokers and racehorse owners

Clark & Robinson was an Australian firm of stockbrokers, of which the principals were William Clark and Lionel George Robinson. They made their fortunes in mining then left for London, where they continued to operate, living in a grand style. They are remembered for their horse racing triumphs, which included two Melbourne Cups.

== History ==
Robinson and Clark went into partnership in 1890 and developed a large and profitable business dealing in mining shares during the Broken Hill and Kalgoorlie mining booms.

In 1895 Clark & Robinson moved their office to Adelaide, initially located at 27 Grenfell Street from April 1896 to October 1897, then Cowra Chambers, 23 Grenfell Street, then from March 1899 Brookman Building, 35 Grenfell Street. Robinson made substantial investments in the Hainault Goldmiming Company, which proved highly profitable.

Robinson began an association with Kalgoorlie and its "Golden Mile" when the Great Boulder Proprietary opened up its 200 ft. level, and in the late '90s deputised Sydney J. Yeo to open the company's Kalgoorlie office.

A large and lucrative business was developed with London, and Robinson moved there to handle this business in person. The rules of the London Stock Exchange not only demanded that he relinquish his membership of Australian Exchanges before he could join, but could not belong to an overseas partnership, so that with Clark was dissolved in May 1899 by mutual agreement.

For a couple of years Robinson and Clark ran their respective offices independently, then decided to reunite in London. Clark and his accountant Guy Stanton left for England in May 1902. Clark, who had renounced membership of the Stock Exchanges of Melbourne and Adelaide, was elected a member of the London Stock Exchange as from 1 January 1905, and on the same day Clark joined Robinson as a partner of the firm of Lionel Robinson and Co., renamed Lionel Robinson, Clark & Co., with offices at 24 Throgmorton Street, London. Within two years it was the largest finance house dealing in Australian mining shares in London. Business was good and the company prospered even better than it had in Australia, and each became very wealthy.

The Adelaide office was taken over by Arthur J. Walkley, previously an employee, and became a minor partner of the new company; he died 1 March 1942 after being struck by a tram. Other employees who later became partners were Andrew D. Young, Sydney E. Knights (later a member of the London Stock Exchange), and C. B. Jessop. Robinson was ever on the lookout for business opportunities in Australia: in 1905 when the Broken Hill mines were struggling with a host of problems he organised a luxury private carriage on the "Barrier" train for an invited group of industrialists and investors, who invested thousands of pounds of British capital into the North and South mines, Zinc Corporation, and Amalgamated Zinc Companies. Robinson and Clark formed a company Broken Hill Syndicate Limited with W.L., E.L. and W. Baillieu and others.

In 1919 the stockbroking firm of Knights, Jessop & Stanton was involved in the takeover of Lionel Robinson, Clark & Co.

Although he made his fortune through mining stocks, Robinson was also interested in industrials: he was a major shareholder director of the London Motor Omnibus Company, and the London Underground Railways. As a director of the omnibus company he was concerned at the reputation motor 'buses had for unreliability, and insisted on a daily overhaul of each bus, whether giving problems or not, with immediate beneficial results. Robinson and Clark invested heavily in establishing woollen mills and associated factories in Victoria.

From 1915 to 1921 Robinson was a committee member of the London Stock Exchange, and in 1916 became High Sheriff of Norfolk.

After Robinson's death, Yeo in Adelaide said:— *Lionel Robinson was a loyal friend and a thorough-going gentleman, and I would work the skin off my bones for him." In announcing the death of Robinson to members of the Stock Exchange of Adelaide, the President (W. B. Carr) said that although it was some years since he had been associated with the Adelaide Exchange, Robinson was well known to all the present-day members, who would deeply regret his death. The success they achieved in Adelaide they followed up in London, where they quickly gained a high reputation in leading financial circles. As a man Lionel Robinson was beloved by all his associates on the Exchange. He had a charming personality, and his cheerful disposition made him a host of friends who still retained a pleasant recollection of the days he spent among them.

When Robinson was alive the pair were known in the house as "the Siamese twins." and were inseparable both in business and sport, but on the death of his partner Clark lost a great part of his enthusiasm for racing, and allowed his stable to become became a skeleton of its earlier self.

=== Old Buckenham ===
Robinson purchased the historic Hall at Old Buckenham in Norfolk in 1906, and seldom left for London unless on urgent business. The cricket field was a salient feature of the property.

One cricket commentator wrote:

There is hardly a more beautiful place in Norfolk than Mr. Lionel Robinson's 'Buckenham Hall.' During the visit of the A.I.F. team to his home Mr. Robinson had the favorite for the English Derby, and told us to have a little on it, as it was very highly fancied. Unfortunately it 'went wrong,' and did not start. Mr. Robinson is also very greatly interested financially in several mining propositions in this country, and has nearly always entertained the Australians at his house during their many visits to the Old Country. The ground itself is situated about half a mile from the house in delightful surroundings. The attendance is always very small, owing to the neighborhood being principally occupied by farmers. However, the lack of spectators does not diminish the enthusiasm of the players in any way. The members of both teams stay at Mr. Robinson's house, with the exception of the professionals, and are entertained in a wonderful manner. It can be assumed that Mr. Robinson has guaranteed a certain sum to the Australians for this match. In addition he pays all the expenses of his own side, and, after taking into account that there is no charge whatever for admission to the ground, it can be readily understood that the match is rather an expensive luxury, even for him.

In 1921 he fielded a team against Warwick Armstrong's Australian XI at Old Buckenham Hall, which attracted a large number of spectators.

Lionel Robinson died there of cancer on 27 July 1922, having taken little part in financial affairs after the war. He left an estate valued at around £240,000. Around 1937 Old Buckenham Hall became the new site of a school for boys, which was founded in 1862 by the Misses Ellen and Margaret Ringer in Lowestoft, Suffolk. Both Lionel and Mary Robinson were buried in the churchyard on the property.

=== Windlesham Moor ===
Clark purchased Windlesham Moor, a picturesque Surrey mansion in 50 acres of grounds on the edge of Windsor Forest, in 1921 and, like Robinson, never returned to Australia.

The mansion was built at the end of The Great War by Sir Byron Peters and run by Lady Peters as a convalescent hospital.

Robinson and the 50 acres laid out as a formal garden by noted landscape gardener Gomer Waterer. They sold the property to South African millionaire Philip Hill in 1942, and on his death passed to his wife, who became Mrs. Warwick Byant.

Windlesham Moor was rented for Princess Elizabeth and Philip Mountbatten as a country retreat directly after their marriage in November 1947 and while Sunninghill Park, which had been largely damaged by fire, was being rebuilt.

In 1950 Mrs. Bryant put it on the market, and was purchased in 1953 by Melbourne bicycle and motor vehicle wholesaler William L. Buckland.

=== Horseracing ===
In Australia

Clark and Robinson were partners as racehorse owners as well as in business. Clark engaged Richard Bradfield, who had recently lost a major client in Frederick W. Purches (c. 1852–1937), as their trainer in Australia, and that was the beginning of the long and fruitful connection of Clark and Robinson (dubbed "The Firm") with Bradfield's stable. Their Australian successes included:

- SAJC Derby with Hainault (1898); with Rienzi (1902)
- SAJC St Leger with The Victory (1898)
- SAJC (Queen's) Birthday Cup with The Victory (1898)
- VRC Standish Handicap with The Victory (1902)
- Maribyrnong Plate with Niphetos (1901)
- Melbourne Cup with The Victory (1902); Backwood (1924)

Although Clark and Robinson were living in England they continued over a long period to keep a few horses with Bradfield. When racing was curtailed in England during The Great War of 1914–1918 they sent out Magpie, King Offa, Lanius, Lucknow, Elsdon, Shadowland, Coq d'Or and Escombe to Bradfield, who won races with most of them.

- Futurity Stakes with Eudorus (1913); Flash of Steel (1915); Lucknow (1919)
- Caulfield Cup with King Offa (1918); Lucknow (1919). This was a great one for Bradfield, who had trained the three placed horses: Lucknow, Night Watch, and Chrome.
- The Metropolitan with St Spasa (1914)
- Adelaide Cup with St Spasa (1916); Elsdon (1918)
- Lanius was successful in some weight-for-age races
- Magpie was successful in some weight-for-age races

The 1924 Melbourne Cup was won by Backwood for Clark, his son-in-law Clive Baillieu, and Alan Hughes. Robinson had died two years previously and without his old friend and business partner Clark had lost some of his enthusiasm for racing. He had also lost hope in Backwood's chances, as since his importation from England the horse had not shown any sign of his earlier promise.

Their Australian racing manager was Isaac Earnshaw, and on his death in 1914 C. Leslie Macdonald took over. Macdonald retired three years later and the position was taken by S. Bloomfield.

In England

Unlike the principal Australian clubs, the English Jockey Club did not permit racing partnerships, and for that reason horses belonging to the Clark-Robinson partnership were raced in England in the name of one or other of the partners. At their Old Buckenham stud at Attleborough, Norfolk, they bred and trained dozens of top-flight thoroughbred racehorses. Gingal, Linacre, Merrylips, Demure and Sham Fight won 11 races in 1907. Other winners were All Black, Basil, The Whirlpool, and Linacre in 1908; Slipton, Basil, and Budorus in 1909; Prince Galahad in 1920. Some or all were trained by J. E. "Jack" Brewer ( – May 1931), and their jockeys included Stanley Wootton.

== Families ==
=== Robinson ===
Anthony Bennett Robinson (15 September 1832 – 12 November 1908) born in Bath, Somersetshire, married Harriet Salmon née Barton (1840 – 24 March 1910). She was the youngest sister of Edmund Barton. He was commercial editor for The Age.

- Lionel Robinson (29 August 1866 – 27 July 1922) married Mary Annie James in Carlton, Victoria, on 12 March 1890 and had two daughters:

- Viola Murielle Robinson (11 February 1891 – ) married James John Evans son of Sir Griffith Humphrey Pugh Evans
- Eirene Marguerite Robinson (29 November 1892 – ) married Lt. Col. John Brockbank CBE

- Frederick Farquhar "Fred" Robinson (31 December 1868 – 25 March 1953) married Caroline Margaret ?? ( – 3 August 1942). He was managing director of the Yarra Falls Spinning Company and the Australian Knitting Mills. He was a racehorse owner and lawn bowls champion.

- Cmdr. Lionel Robinson ( – ), of Bradford Cotton Mills
- Norman Robinson ( – ) married to Edna Jeanne Smibert on 25 October 1916. He was chairman of VATC and owner of Dominant, winner of the Easter Stakes at Williamstown on 26 March 1932.
- Madge Robinson ( – ) married Gordon George Gluth on 30 July 1914; later married H. C. Summers (of Carnegie? Nov 1954)

- Sir Arthur Robinson KCMG (23 April 1872 – 17 May 1945) married Annie Summers Puckle ( – 27 November 1937) on 18 April 1899. He was Attorney-General of Victoria, sat in both Houses in Victoria, and (Federal) House of Representatives.

- Alan Bennett Robinson

- Gerald Henry Robinson (1873–1961) a metallurgist by profession
- William Sydney Robinson (2 October 1876 – 1963) married Charlotte Christie on 10 April 1900. He succeeded his father as commercial editor for The Age; later chairman of Broken Hill Associated Smelters. He owned the horse Dark Sky.

=== Clark ===
- William Clark (c. 1868 – August 1948) married Julia Kingston (c. 1875 – February 1934) of Adelaide. Julia was a daughter of Robert Kingston and Mary Jessup

- Ruby Florence Evelyn Clark (1892 – 21 October 1962) married Sir Clive Baillieu OBE CMG (24 September 1889 – 18 June 1967) in 1915, lived in "Parkwood", Surrey; he became Baron Baillieu of Parkwood and Sefton. They had three sons and a daughter:

- William Latham Baillieu (2nd Lord Baillieu) born (c. 1916 18 April 1973) lived Chiddingly, Sussex died when his car ran into a truck.

- James William Latham Baillieu (3rd Lord Baillieu) (born 15 November 1950) married Cornelia Ladd on 25 May 1974

- Robert Latham Baillieu MBE (18 July 1917 – ) married Mary Delphine Dowler in 1949
- Edward Latham Baillieu MA (17 October 1919 – ) married Betty Taylor on 6 June 1942

- Garnet Leslie Clark lived in London

William Clark's brothers were Albert Thomas Clark ( – 16 December 1930), a member of the Melbourne Stock Exchange; Percy Clark and younger brother Alfred Z. Clark (c. 1871 – 15 May 1908), mining engineer who patented an ore treatment process, was killed in a car crash.
