= Lionel Robinson =

Lionel George Robinson (29 August 1866 – 27 July 1922) was a leading financier in Australia and England who was known for his success in horseracing and his support of cricket, and later served as the High Sheriff of Norfolk.

== Early life ==
Born in Colombo a son of Mr. A. B. Robinson, for many years commercial editor of the Melbourne Age. He was a grandson of William Barton, Australia's first stockbroker, by his daughter Harriet, and a nephew of Edmund Barton, the first Prime Minister of Australia. He was educated at Scotch College, Melbourne and may have been destined for a law career, but found employment in the Melbourne stockbroking company of Donaldson & Co. This was the time of a great mining boom and Robinson discovered he had an aptitude for finances and at the comparatively early age of 22 was elected to the Melbourne Stock Exchange and went into partnership with William Clark (c. 1868 – August 1948), also a member of the Melbourne Exchange, as Clark & Robinson.

== Clark & Robinson ==
Robinson and Clark went into partnership in 1888 and developed a large and profitable business dealing in mining shares during the Broken Hill and Kalgoorlie mining booms.

In 1895 Clark & Robinson moved their office to Adelaide, initially located at 27 Grenfell Street from April 1896 to October 1897, then Cowra Chambers, 23 Grenfell Street, then from March 1899 Brookman Building, 35 Grenfell Street. Robinson made substantial investments in the Hainault Goldmining Company, which proved highly profitable.

Robinson began an association with Kalgoorlie and its "Golden Mile" when the Great Boulder Proprietary opened up its 200 ft. level, and in the late '90s deputised Sydney J. Yeo to open the company's Kalgoorlie office.

A large and lucrative business was developed with London, and Robinson moved there to handle this business in person. The rules of the London Stock Exchange not only demanded that he relinquish his membership of Australian Exchanges before he could join, but could not belong to an overseas partnership, so that with Clark was dissolved in May 1899 by mutual agreement.

For a couple of years Robinson and Clark ran their respective offices independently, then decided to reunite in London. Clark and his accountant Guy Stanton left for England in May 1902. Clark, who had renounced membership of the Stock Exchanges of Melbourne and Adelaide, was elected a member of the London Stock Exchange as from 1 January 1905, and on the same day Clark joined Robinson as a partner of the firm of Lionel Robinson and Co., renamed Lionel Robinson, Clark & Co., with offices at 24 Throgmorton Street, London. Within two years it was the largest finance house dealing in Australian mining shares in London. Business was good and the company prospered even better than it had in Australia, and each became very wealthy.

Robinson was ever on the lookout for business opportunities in Australia: in 1905 when the Broken Hill mines were struggling with a host of problems he organised a luxury private carriage on the "Barrier" train for an invited group of industrialists and investors, who invested thousands of pounds of British capital into the North and South mines, Zinc Corporation, and Amalgamated Zinc Companies.

Robinson and Clark formed a company Broken Hill Syndicate Limited with W.L., E.L. and W. Baillieu and others.

Although he made his fortune through mining stocks, Robinson was also interested in industrials: he was a major shareholder director of the London Motor Omnibus Company, and the London Underground Railways. As a director of the omnibus company he was concerned at the reputation motor 'buses had for unreliability, and insisted on a daily overhaul of each bus, whether giving problems or not, with immediate beneficial results. Robinson and Clark invested heavily in establishing woollen mills and associated factories in Victoria.

From 1915 to 1921 Robinson was a committee member of the London Stock Exchange, and in 1916 became High Sheriff of Norfolk.

When Robinson was alive the pair were known in the house as "the Siamese twins." and were inseparable both in business and sport, but on the death of his partner Clark lost a great part of his enthusiasm for racing, and allowed his stable to become became a skeleton of its earlier self.

== Old Buckenham ==
Robinson purchased the historic Old Buckenham Hall at Old Buckenham in Norfolk in 1906 from Frederick Duleep Singh. He replaced the existing Georgian house with a vast neo-Jacobean mansion and expanded the estate from 340 to 2000 acres.

He established Old Buckenham Stud to further his involvement in horse racing and also laid out two separate cricket grounds, each equipped with a thatched timber pavilion. The first ground was half a mile from the Hall and adjacent to the Stud. The second – still in use today - was created in a woodland clearing close to the rebuilt Hall. Robinson's personal cricket team played the first of six first-class cricket matches against the touring South Africans South Africans in 1912.

In 1919, Robinson hosted the Australian Imperial Forces, a team formed of Australian servicemen who were facing a prolonged delay to their demobilisation. The A.I.F. team had been selected from around 100 Australian servicemen who had turned up for trials at Lord's and The Oval.

In early May 1921, a final first-class match was held at the ground between L. G. Robinson's XI and the touring Australians. Robinson’s team was captained by his cricket manager, the former England captain Archie MacLaren, and included Jack Hobbs, Percy Chapman and Johnny Douglas. Australia were led by Warwick Armstrong and included Jack Gregory – who had made his first-class debut with the A.I.F team at Old Buckenham two years previously – Warren Bardsley and Charlie Macartney. The three-day match was rain-affected and ended in a draw. Hobbs top-scored with 85, an effort he later nominated as possibly his finest ever innings. A crowd of up to 10,000 watched Hobbs bat on the second day, believed to be the largest ever to attend a cricket match in Norfolk.

One Australian cricket commentator wrote:

There is hardly a more beautiful place in Norfolk than Mr. Lionel Robinson's 'Buckenham Hall.' During the visit of the A.I.F. team to his home, Mr. Robinson had the favorite for the English Derby, and told us to have a little on it, as it was very highly fancied. Unfortunately it 'went wrong,' and did not start. Mr. Robinson is also very greatly interested financially in several mining propositions in this country, and has nearly always entertained the Australians at his house during their many visits to the Old Country. The ground itself is situated about half a mile from the house in delightful surroundings. The attendance is always very small, owing to the neighborhood being principally occupied by farmers. However, the lack of spectators does not diminish the enthusiasm of the players in any way. The members of both teams stay at Mr. Robinson's house, with the exception of the professionals, and are entertained in a wonderful manner. It can be assumed that Mr. Robinson has guaranteed a certain sum to the Australians for this match. In addition he pays all the expenses of his own side, and, after taking into account that there is no charge whatsoever for admission to the ground, it can be readily understood that the match is rather an expensive luxury, even for him.

== Horseracing ==
In Australia

Clark and Robinson were partners as racehorse owners as well as in business. Clark engaged Richard Bradfield, who had recently lost a major client in Frederick W. Purches (c. 1852–1937), as their trainer in Australia, and that was the beginning of the long and fruitful connection of Clark and Robinson (dubbed "The Firm") with Bradfield's stable. Their Australian successes included:

- SAJC Derby with Hainault (1898); with Rienzi (1902)
- SAJC St Leger with The Victory (1898)
- SAJC (Queen's) Birthday Cup with The Victory (1898)
- VRC Standish Handicap with The Victory (1902)
- Maribyrnong Plate with Niphetos (1901)
- Melbourne Cup with The Victory (1902); Backwood (1924)

Although Clark and Robinson were living in England they continued over a long period to keep a few horses with Bradfield. When racing was curtailed in England during The Great War of 1914–1918 they sent out Magpie, King Offa, Lanius, Lucknow, Elsdon, Shadowland, Coq d'Or and Escombe to Bradfield, who won races with most of them.

- Futurity Stakes with Eudorus (1913); Flash of Steel (1915); Lucknow (1919)
- Caulfield Cup with King Offa (1918); Lucknow (1919). This was a great one for Bradfield, who had trained the three placed horses: Lucknow, Night Watch, and Chrome.
- The Metropolitan with St Spasa (1914)
- Adelaide Cup with St Spasa (1916); Elsdon (1918)
- Lanius was successful in some weight-for-age races
- Magpie was successful in some weight-for-age races

Their Australian racing manager was Isaac Earnshaw, and on his death in 1914 C. Leslie Macdonald took over. Macdonald retired three years later and the position was taken by S. Bloomfield.

In England

Unlike the principal Australian clubs, the English Jockey Club did not permit racing partnerships, and for that reason horses belonging to the Clark-Robinson partnership were raced in England in the name of one or other of the partners. At their Old Buckenham stud at Attleborough, Norfolk, they bred and trained dozens of top-flight thoroughbred racehorses. Gingal, Linacre, Merrylips, Demure and Sham Fight won 11 races in 1907. Other winners were All Black, Basil, The Whirlpool, and Linacre in 1908; Slipton, Basil, and Budorus in 1909; Prince Galahad in 1920. Some or all were trained by J. E. "Jack" Brewer, and their jockeys included Stanley Wootton.

== Death ==
Robinson died of cancer at Old Buckenham Hall on 27 July 1922, having taken little part in financial affairs after the war. He left an estate valued at around £240,000.

Both Lionel and Mary Robinson were buried in the churchyard at Old Buckenham.

In announcing the death of Robinson to members of the Stock Exchange of Adelaide, the President (Whitmore Carr) said that "Robinson had a charming personality, and his cheerful disposition made him a host of friends who still retained a pleasant recollection of the days he spent among them."
