= Heroic (horse) =

Australian Thoroughbred racehorse

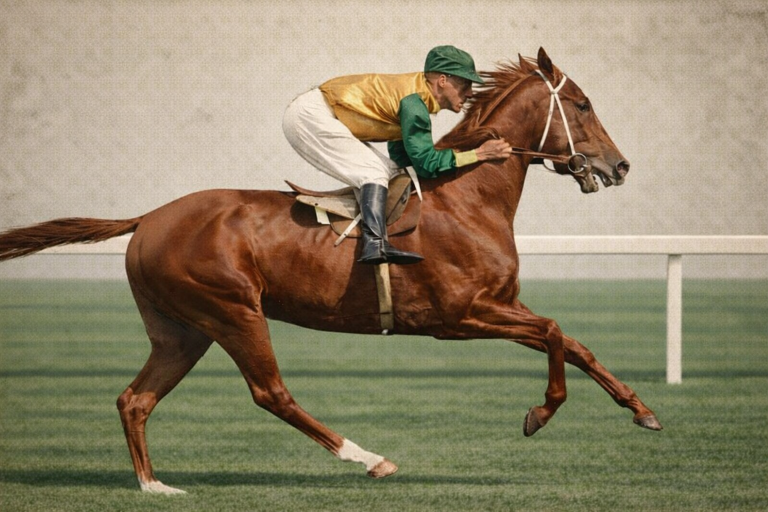
- Heroic and Jim Pike
- Sire: Valais (GB)
- Grandsire: Cicero
- Dam: Chersonese (GB)
- Damsire: Cylgad
- Sex: Stallion
- Foaled: 1 August 1921
- Died: 12 December 1939 (aged 18)
- Country: Australia
- Colour: Chestnut
- Breeder: Arrowfield Stud
- Owner: JB Corten then CB Kellow
- Trainer: Cecil Godby then Jack Holt
- Record: 51: 21-11-4
- Earnings: £38,062

Major wins
- Maribyrnong Plate (1923); Breeders' Plate (1923); Australian Derby (1924); Caulfield Guineas (1924); Champagne Stakes (1924); Chelmsford Stakes (1924); Ascot Vale Stakes (1924); Caulfield Stakes (1925); Memsie Stakes (1925, 1926); W. S. Cox Plate (1926); Newmarket Handicap (1926); Underwood Stakes (1926); William Reid Stakes (1927); C F Orr Stakes (1927); St George Stakes (1927)

Awards
- Leading sire in Australia (1933 -1939)

Honours
- Australian Racing Hall of Fame (2003); Heroic Championship at Randwick Racecourse
- Last updated on 23 August 2010

Heroic (1921–1939) was an Australian Thoroughbred racehorse who won 21 races from 5 furlongs (1,000 metres) to 2 miles (3,200m) and was a leading sire in Australia.

== Breeding ==
Heroic was sired by Valais (by the 1905 Epsom Derby winner, Cicero), his dam was Chersonese (GB) by Cyglad. This made him inbred twice in the 3rd generation to Cyllene and in the 3rd and 4th generations (4x3) to Illuminata through the half-sisters Gas, dam of Cicero and Chelandry. Heroic was a brother to the useful sire, Thracian and a half-brother to the stakeswinner, Cimbrian.

Heroic was an outstanding type of yearling that fetched the top price of 1,800 guineas at the Inglis’ bloodstock sales.

== Racing record ==
He was trained by Jack Holt who posthumously would become part of the 2001 inaugural class inducted in the Australian Racing Hall of Fame.

=== At two years: 1923-1924 ===
Heroic’s stakes wins were:

- 1923 AJC Breeders Plate 5 furlongs
- 1923 VRC Maribyrnong Plate 5 furlongs
- 1924 AJC Champagne Stakes 6 f
- 1924 VRC Ascot Vale Stakes 6 furlongs

During this season he had a total of 10 race starts for 6 wins and 2 thirds.

=== At three years: 1924-1925 ===
His stakes wins were:

- 1924 AJC Australian Derby 12 furlongs
- 1924 Chelmsford Stakes over 9 furlongs, defeating Gloaming by 1½ lengths.
- 1924 VATC Caulfield Guineas 8 furlongs

Following this race Heroic’s nominations for the VRC Derby and Melbourne Cup were rejected. This was as a result of Heroic’s connections being disqualified because of their failure to allow a stable-mate to race on his merits.

In February 1925, C.B. Kellow paid 16,000 guineas, a record price, for the great Heroic, who won a number of races for him afterwards including his only other win for the season, the weight for age (w.f.a.) AJC Autumn Stakes over 12 furlongs.

=== At four years: 1925-1926 ===
Heroic’s principal wins for this season were:

- 1925 VATC Memsie Stakes 9F
- 1925 w.f.a. Caulfield Stakes 9F
- 1926 VRC Newmarket Handicap with 9 st 8 lbs (61 kg)
- 1926 w.f.a. AJC Cumberland Stakes over 14 furlongs defeating the good horse, Windbag.

During this season Heroic had 18 starts for 4 wins and 9 placings.

=== At five years: 1926-1927 ===
Starting his five-year-old racing season in Melbourne Heroic won his first six starts against top horses. These wins were:

- 1926 w.f.a. Williamstown Underwood Stakes 8 furlongs
- 1926 VATC Memsie Stakes over 9F carrying 9 st 11 lbs (62 kg) and beating Manfred.
- 1926 w.f.a. W. S. Cox Plate 10F
- 1927 MVRC William Reid Stakes 6F
- 1927 Wmtn RC C F Orr Stakes 8F
- 1927 VATC St George Stakes 9F

He was then unplaced in the VRC Newmarket Handicap before he finished second to Spearfelt in the VRC Governors Plate. At his next start he won the VRC King's Plate. Taken to Sydney he failed to place in his next four starts and was retired.

== Stud record ==
Heroic was leased from Kellow by H.S. Thompson and stood at his Tarwyn Park Stud at Bylong, New South Wales.

He was no less dominating as a sire, leading the Australian sire list continuously from the 1932/1933 season through the 1938/1939 season.

During his seasons at stud, he sired 29 stakes-winners that had 110 stakes-wins between them earning £293,849 in Australia and New Zealand, including:

- Ajax II (31 stakes-wins, including 18 consecutive race wins)
- Cereza (AJC Adrian Knox Stakes, AJC CW Cropper Plate (twice), VRC Standish Handicap)
- D'Artagnan (WATC CB Cox Stakes, WATC Sires' Produce Stakes etc.)
- Gallantic (NZ) (VRC Oaks Stakes, AJC Adrian Knox Stakes)
- Hall Mark (15 stakes-wins including Melbourne Cup)
- Hua (VRC Victoria Derby, VRC Sires' Produce Stakes, C F Orr Stakes, VRC St Leger Stakes, William Reid Stakes etc.)
- Heroic Prince (VRC Essendon Stakes, VRC Australian Cup)
- Heroic's Double (Stradbroke Handicap)
- Herolage (QLD Tattersall's Cup, Brisbane Cup)
- Heros (AUS) (William Reid Stakes (twice), VATC Futurity Stakes)
- Nuffield (VRC Sires' Produce Stakes, Caulfield Guineas, AJC Sires' Produce Stakes, VRC Victoria Derby, AJC Derby, Maribyrnong Plate
- The Marne (Canterbury Stakes, AJC Challenge Stakes, NSW Tramway, AJC The Shorts)
- Valiant Chief (VRC C.M. Lloyd Stakes, Moonee Valley Stakes, Linlithgow Stakes, VATC Memsie Stakes)

Heroic died on 12 December 1939 at age seventeen and was buried at Growee Gulf Station, near Rylstone, New South Wales.

== Pedigree ==
Pedigree of Heroic (AUS), chestnut stallion, 1921
Sire Valais (GB) Chestnut 1913	Cicero; Chestnut 1902	Cyllene	Bona Vista
Sire Valais (GB) Chestnut 1913	Cicero; Chestnut 1902	Cyllene	Arcadia
Sire Valais (GB) Chestnut 1913	Cicero; Chestnut 1902	Gas	Ayrshire
Sire Valais (GB) Chestnut 1913	Cicero; Chestnut 1902	Gas	Illuminata
Sire Valais (GB) Chestnut 1913	Lily of the Valley; Bay 1899	Martagon	Bend Or
Sire Valais (GB) Chestnut 1913	Lily of the Valley; Bay 1899	Martagon	Tiger Lily
Sire Valais (GB) Chestnut 1913	Lily of the Valley; Bay 1899	Hamptonia	Hampton
Sire Valais (GB) Chestnut 1913	Lily of the Valley; Bay 1899	Hamptonia	Feronia
Dam Chersonese (GB) Bay 1915	Cylgad; Bay 1909	Cyllene	Bona Vista
Dam Chersonese (GB) Bay 1915	Cylgad; Bay 1909	Cyllene	Arcadia
Dam Chersonese (GB) Bay 1915	Cylgad; Bay 1909	Gadfly	Hampton
Dam Chersonese (GB) Bay 1915	Cylgad; Bay 1909	Gadfly	Merry Duchess
Dam Chersonese (GB) Bay 1915	Chelandry; Bay 1894	Goldfinch	Ormonde
Dam Chersonese (GB) Bay 1915	Chelandry; Bay 1894	Goldfinch	Thistle
Dam Chersonese (GB) Bay 1915	Chelandry; Bay 1894	Illuminata	Rosicrucian
Dam Chersonese (GB) Bay 1915	Chelandry; Bay 1894	Illuminata	Paraffin (Family: 1-n)
