= Maybe Mahal Stakes =

Maybe Mahal Stakes raced as The Hong Kong Jockey Club Stakes (2021)
- Class: Group 3
- Location: Flemington Racecourse, Melbourne, Australia
- Inaugurated: 2005
- Race type: Thoroughbred
- Sponsor: Hong Kong Jockey Club (2014-2026)

Race information
- Distance: 1,400 metres
- Surface: Turf
- Qualification: Mares four years old and older
- Weight: Set weights with penalties
- Purse: $240,000 (2026)

The Maybe Mahal Stakes raced as The Hong Kong Jockey Club Stakes (2021), is a registered Victoria Racing Club Group 3 Thoroughbred set weights with penalties horse race for mares, over a distance of 1400 metres held annually at Flemington Racecourse, Melbourne, Australia during the VRC Spring Racing Carnival on Melbourne Cup day.

== History ==
The registered race is named after Maybe Mahal, 1977-1978 Australian Racehorse of the Year and trained by Bart Cummings.

=== Name ===
- 2005 - Liberty Financial Plate
- 2006–2007 - Liberty Financial Stakes
- 2008–2012 - Herald Sun Stakes
- 2013 - Lavazza Short Black
- 2014–2018 - Hong Kong Jockey Club Stakes
- 2019 - Jim Beam Stakes
- 2020 - Hong Kong Jockey Club Stakes

=== Grade ===
- 2005–2011 - Listed Race
- 2012 onwards - Group 3

== Winners ==
The following are past winners of the race.

- 2026 - Shadhavar
- 2025 - Dance to The Boom
- 2024 - Fancify
- 2023 - Skew Wiff
- 2022 - Larkspur Run
- 2021 - Rich Hips
- 2020 - Rich Hips
- 2019 - Teleplay
- 2018 - Cool Passion
- 2017 - Pedrena
- 2016 - Artistry
- 2015 - Scarlet Billows
- 2014 - Mahara
- 2013 - Plucky Belle
- 2012 - Koonoomoo
- 2011 - Sophie's Spirit
- 2010 - Jersey Lily
- 2009 - Strawberry Field
- 2008 - Neroli
- 2007 - Juste Momente
- 2006 - Storm Signal
- 2005 - Vintner

== See also ==
- Maribyrnong Plate
- Melbourne Cup
- List of Australian Group races
- Group races
