= Standish Handicap =

- Class: Group 3
- Location: Flemington Racecourse
- Inaugurated: 1884
- Race type: Thoroughbred

Race information
- Distance: 1,200 metres
- Surface: Turf
- Qualification: Maidens ineligible
- Weight: Handicap
- Purse: $200,000 (2026)

The Standish Handicap is a Victoria Racing Club Group 3 Thoroughbred horse race held under open handicap conditions, over a distance of 1200 metres at Flemington Racecourse in Melbourne, Australia in January, traditionally on New Year's Day.

== History ==
The Standish Handicap is named after Captain Frederick Standish, (1824–1883) a VRC chairman and former Chief Commissioner of police at the time of the bushranger Ned Kelly. Standish is also credited with coming up with an idea to run a race and call it the Melbourne Cup.

=== 1944 racebook ===
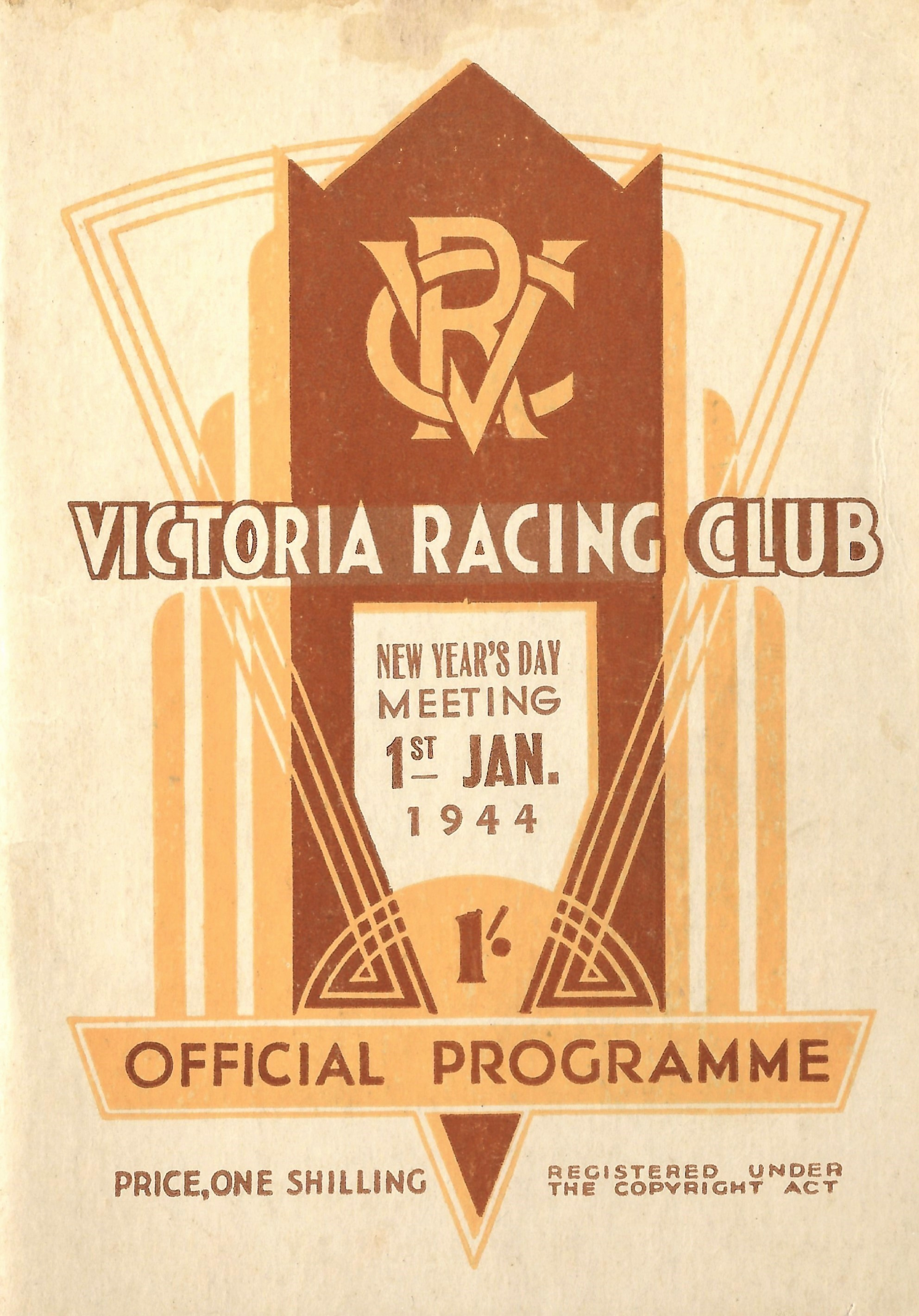
1944 VRC Standish Handicap racebook front cover

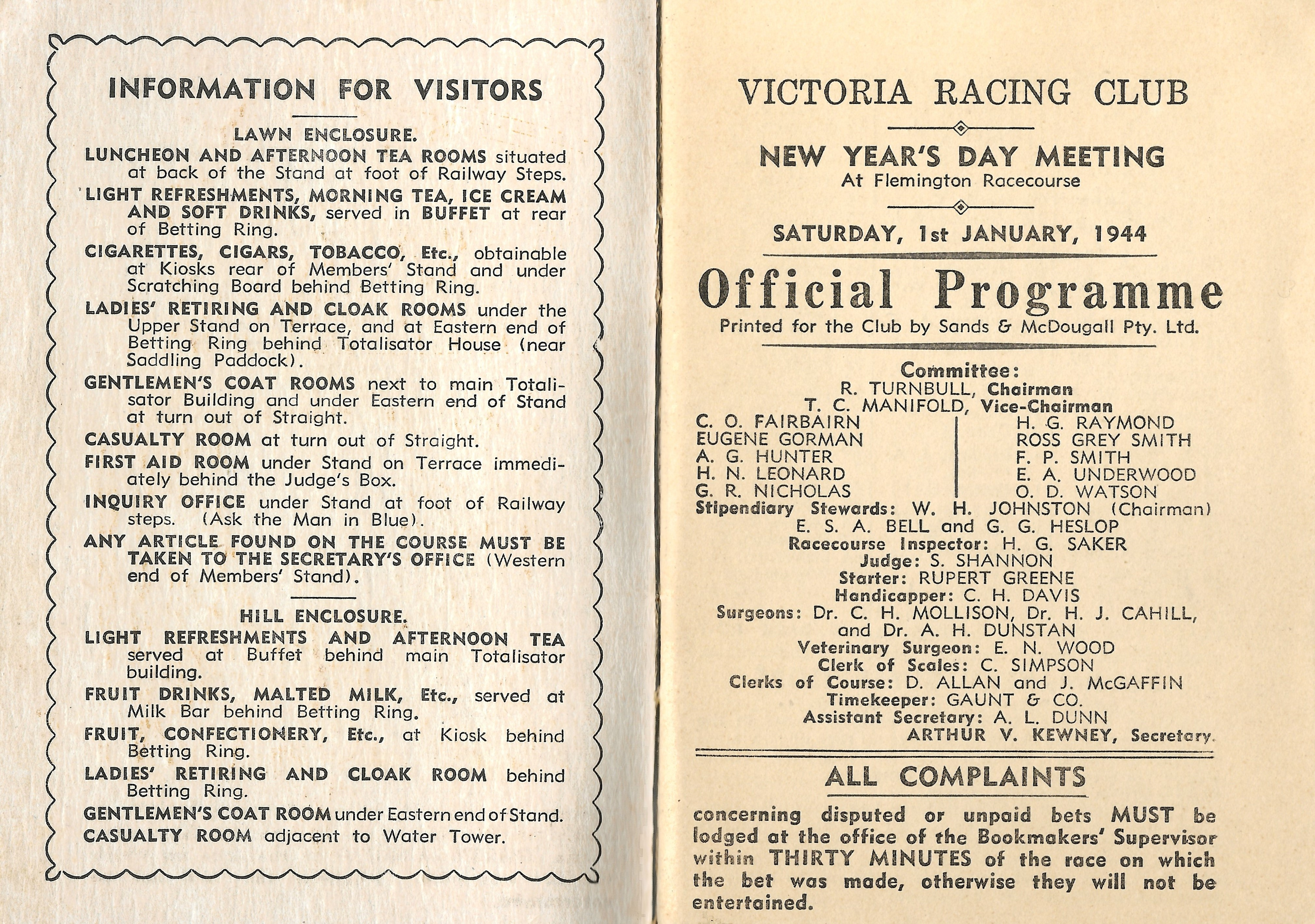
1944 VRC Standish Handicap raceday officials

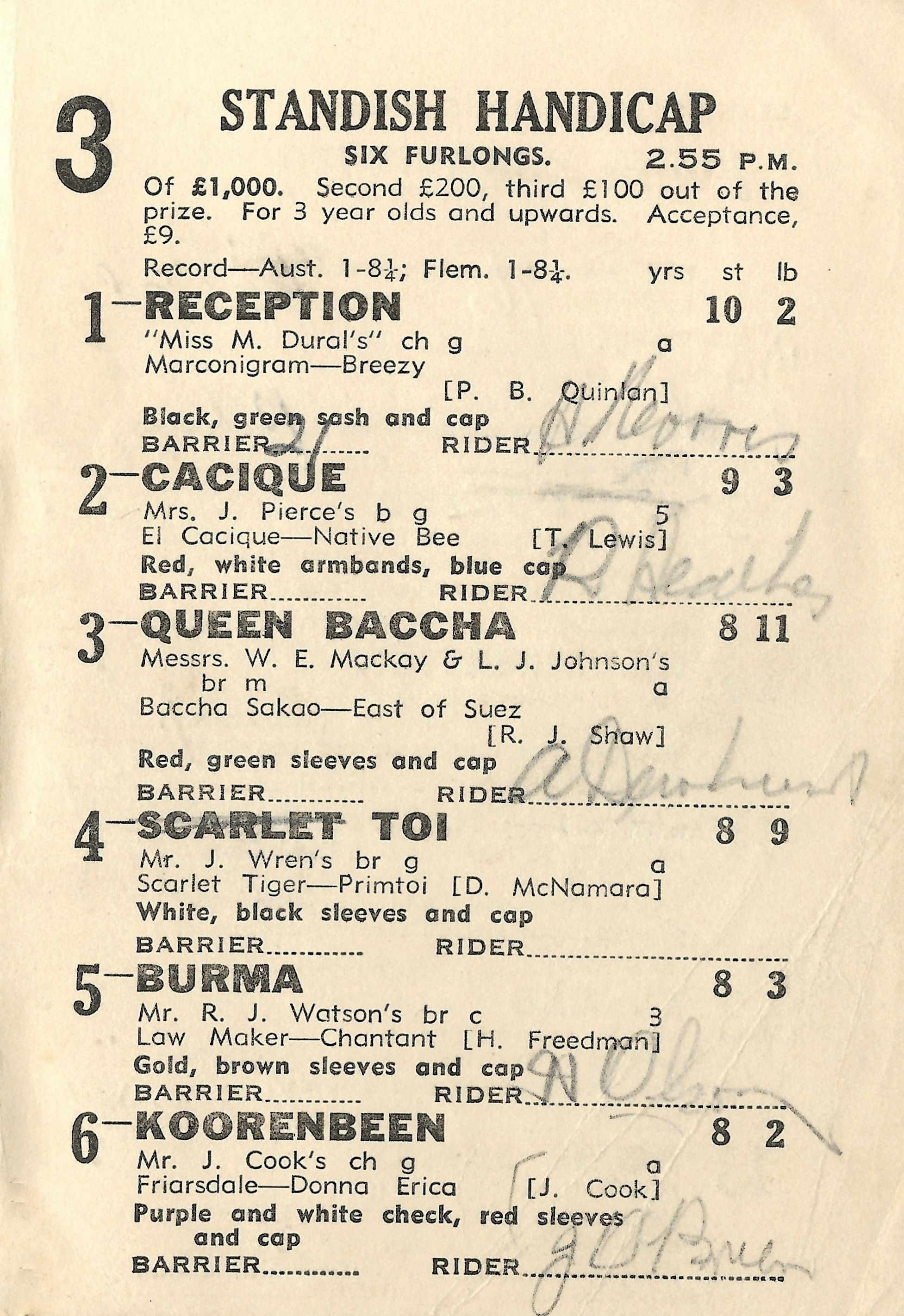
1944 VRC Standish Handicap starters and results

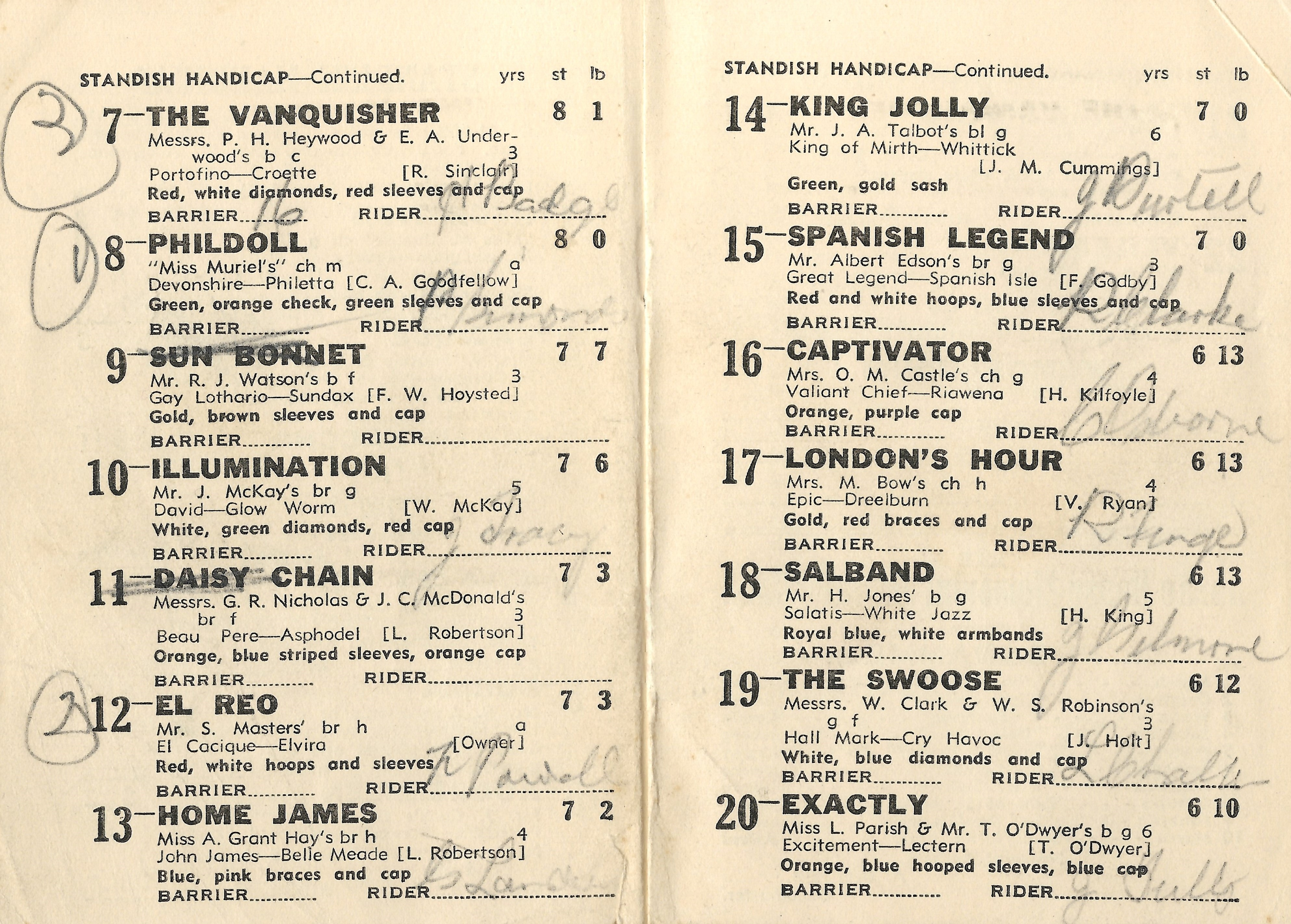
1944 VRC Standish Handicap showing the winner, Phildoll

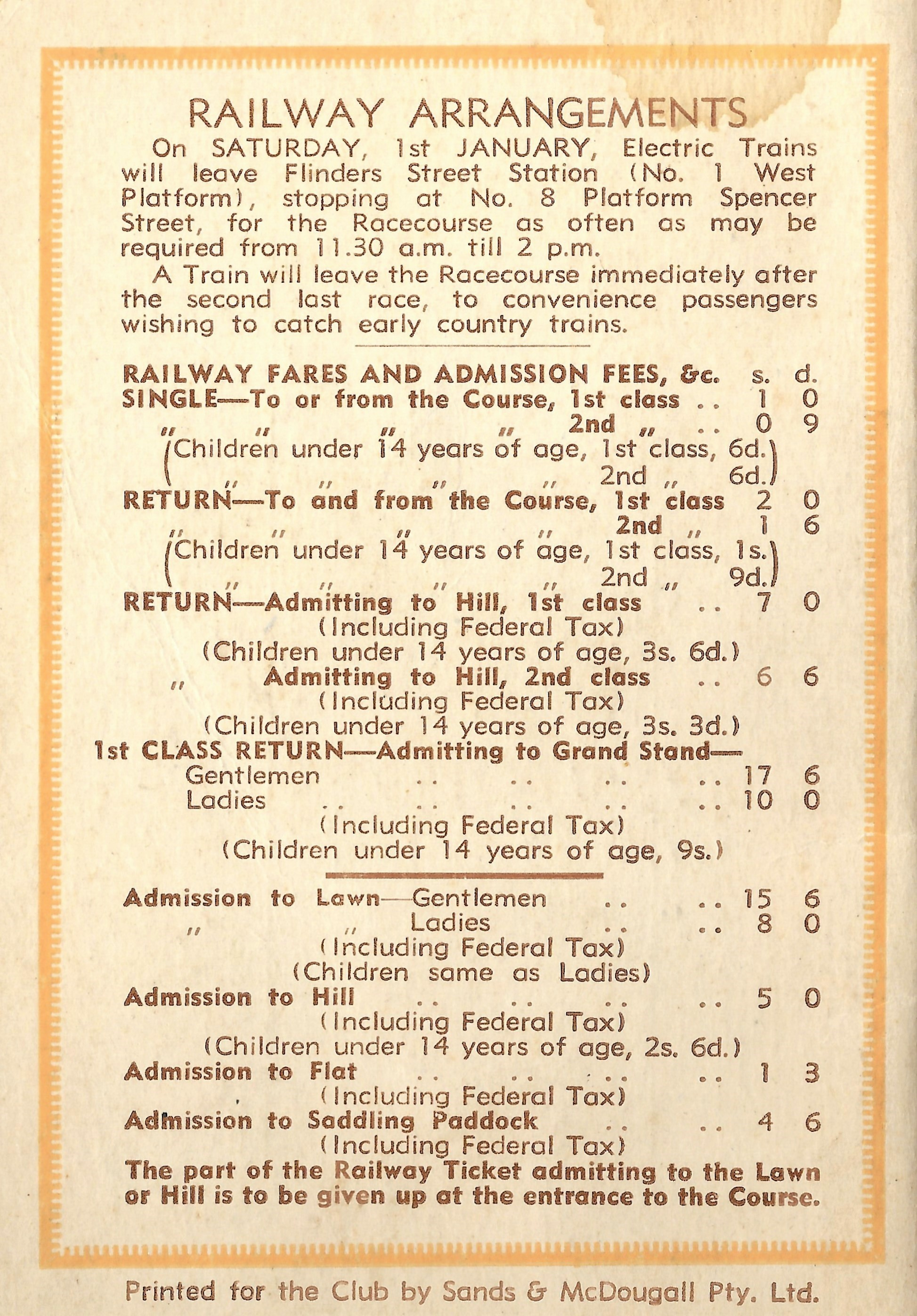
Back cover showing railway arrangements and charges at the entrance gates

=== Distance ===
- 1884–1972 - 6 furlongs
- 1973–2005 – 1200 metres
- 2006 – 1100 metres
- 2007 onwards - 1200 metres

=== Venue ===
- Flemington
- 1997 the race was run at Moonee Valley Racecourse.
- 2006 the race was run at Caulfield Racecourse.

=== Grade ===
- 1884–1979 - Principal race
- 1980 onwards - Group 3

== Winners ==
The following are winners of the race.

- 2026 - Disneck
- 2025 - It'sourtime
- 2024 - Sghirripa
- 2023 - Snapper
- 2022 - Halvorsen
- 2021 - Sirius Suspect
- 2020 - Halvorsen
- 2019 - Whispering Brook
- 2018 - Lord Of The Sky
- 2017 - Odyssey Moon
- 2016 - Durendal
- 2015 - Decircles
- 2014 - Flamberge
- 2013 - Adamantium
- 2012 - Catapulted
- 2011 - Ahdashim
- 2010 - Royal Ida
- 2009 - King Hoaks
- 2008 - Publishing
- 2007 - Watchyerback
- 2006 - Honalee
- 2005 - Super Impressive
- 2004 - Blessum
- 2003 - Super Impressive
- 2002 - Lets Planet
- 2001 - Iglesia
- 2000 - Upright
- 1999 - Whistle Up
- 1998 - Hon Kwok Star
- 1997 - Khaptingly
- 1996 - Ben's Rocket
- 1995 - Blue Boss
- 1994 - Laser Beam
- 1993 - Western Voyage
- 1992 - Jolly Old Mac
- 1991 - Grandiose
- 1990 - Strawberry Ranch
- 1989 - Grandiose
- 1988 - Redelva
- 1987 - Burano
- 1986 - True Version
- 1985 - Maniwreck
- 1984 - Warrior King
- 1983 - Braw Laddie
- 1982 - Hes A Haze
- 1981 - Grey Sapphire
- 1980 - Rooney
- 1979 - Kaoru Coup
- 1978 - Rooney
- 1977 - Skylea
- 1976 - Aurealis
- 1975 - Vain Prince
- 1974 - Brooklyn
- 1973 - Mao's Peak
- 1972 - Scarborough Fair
- 1971 - Timele
- 1970 - Jimeal
- 1969 - Ridicule
- 1968 - Lord Orpin
- 1967 - Top Court
- 1966 - Elect
- 1965 - Tone
- 1964 - Chokra
- 1963 - Regolano
- 1962 - Monte Bianco
- 1961 - Victorious
- 1960 - Planetoid
- 1959 - Scenic Star
- 1958 - Sports Quiz
- 1957 - On Parade
- 1956 - Fair Chief
- 1955 - Cowboy Bill
- 1954 - Hyroanie
- 1953 - Flying Halo
- 1952 - Gay Saint
- 1951 - Ungar
- 1950 - Ungar
- 1949 - Chal
- 1948 - High Play
- 1947 - Air Marshal
- 1946 - David's Last
- 1945 - David's Last
- 1944 - Phildoll
- 1943 - Reception
- 1942 - Orteli
- 1941 - Manrico
- 1940 - Chatsbury
- 1939 - Manrico
- 1938 - Amiable
- 1937 - Cereza
- 1936 - Ogwell
- 1935 - Press Gang
- 1934 - Calulu King
- 1933 - Waltzing Lily
- 1932 - Bold Bid
- 1931 - Umbertana
- 1930 - Birdcage
- 1929 - Aga Khan
- 1928 - Sans Culotte
- 1927 - Quintus
- 1926 - Trice
- 1925 - Valdes
- 1924 - Una Carlos
- 1923 - Sunburst
- 1922 - Whiz Bang
- 1921 - Blue Cross
- 1920 - Blue Cross
- 1919 - Head Wind
- 1918 - Perdo
- 1917 - Aleconner
- 1916 - Eurobin
- 1915 - Iownit
- 1914 - Captain White
- 1913 - Berry Consols
- 1912 - Berry Consols
- 1911 - Carette
- 1910 - Malmsey
- 1909 - Dunolly
- 1908 - Miss Bobby
- 1907 - Miss Bobby
- 1906 - Rosebloom
- 1905 - Sinnang
- 1904 - Silenus
- 1903 - Fishery
- 1902 - The Victory
- 1901 - Duke Of Portland
- 1900 - Silvermoor
- 1899 - Veloce
- 1898 - Embrasure
- 1897 - Culzean
- 1896 - Lord Charles Scott
- 1895 - Fortunatus
- 1894 - Parramatta
- 1893 - Ascot Vale
- 1892 - Barefoot
- 1891 - Gladstone
- 1890 - Fishwife
- 1889 - Boz
- 1888 - Mozart
- 1887 - William Tell
- 1886 - Duration
- 1885 - Middlemarch
- 1884 - Chuckster

== See also ==
- List of Australian Group races
- Group races
