= Maribyrnong Plate =

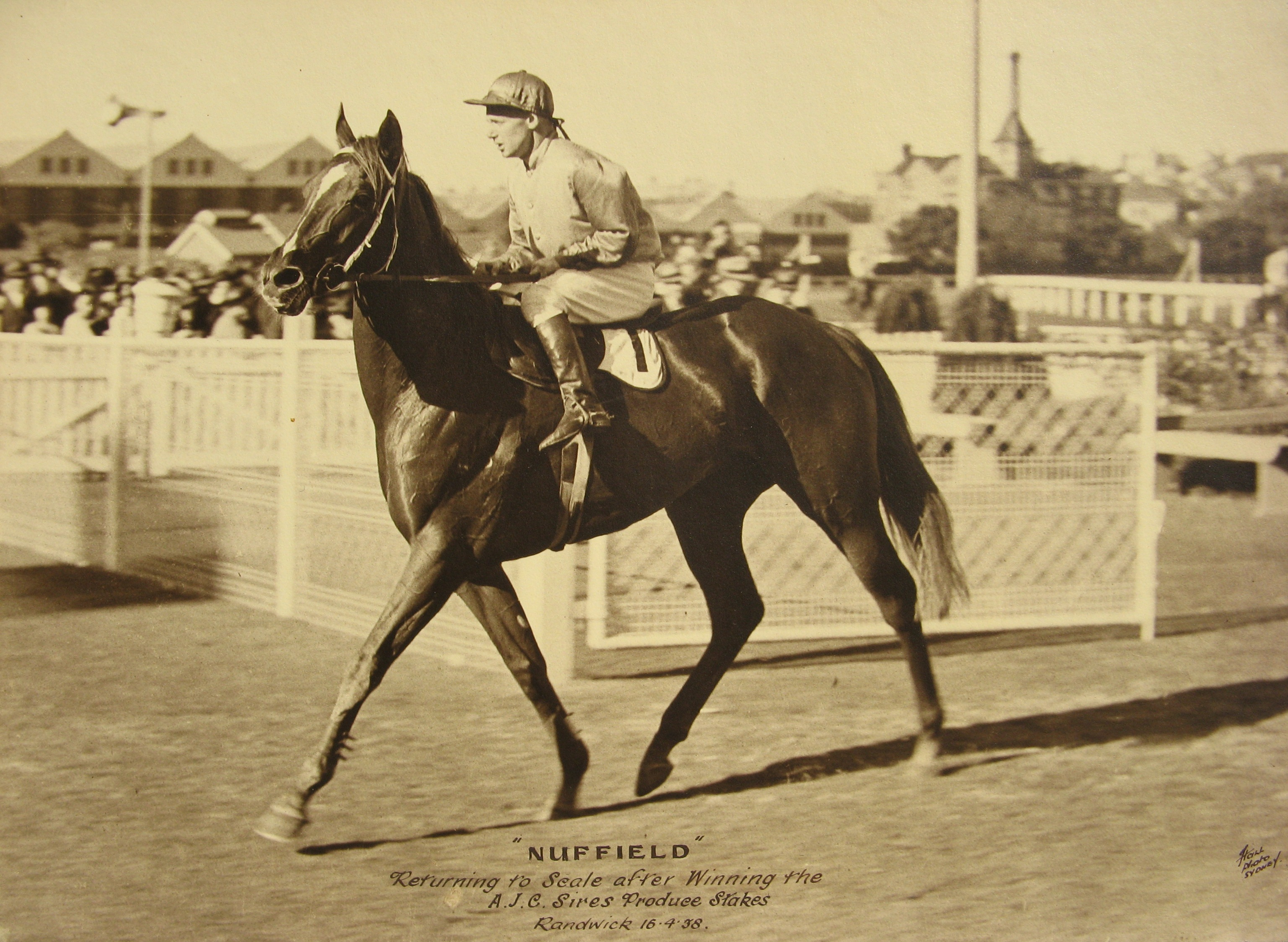
- Nuffield, 1937 winner
- Class: Group 3
- Location: Flemington Racecourse, Melbourne, Australia
- Inaugurated: 1871
- Race type: Thoroughbred
- Sponsor: Darley (2019-2026)

Race information
- Distance: 1,000 metres
- Surface: Turf
- Track: Left-handed
- Qualification: Two-year-olds
- Weight: Set weights Colts and geldings – 57 kg. Fillies – 55 kg.
- Purse: $240,000 (2026)

The Maribyrnong Plate is a Victoria Racing Club Group 3 Thoroughbred horse race for two-year-olds, at set weights, over a distance of 1000 metres, at Flemington Racecourse, Melbourne, Australia during the VRC Spring Carnival in November.

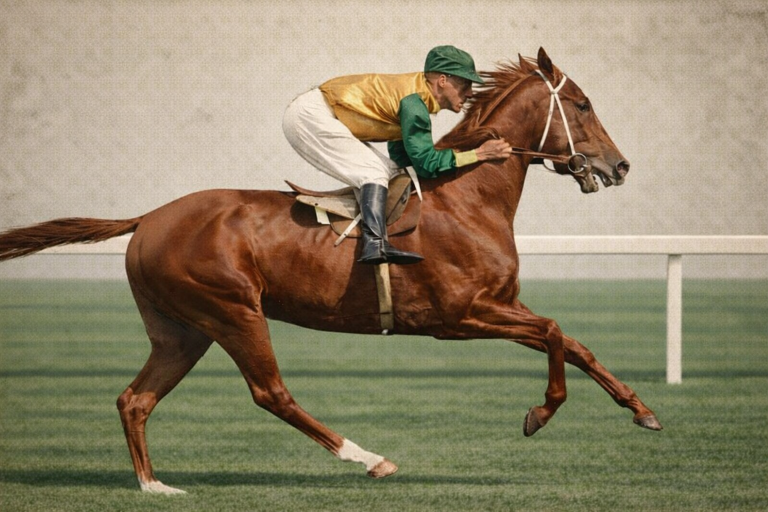
Heroic, 1923 winner

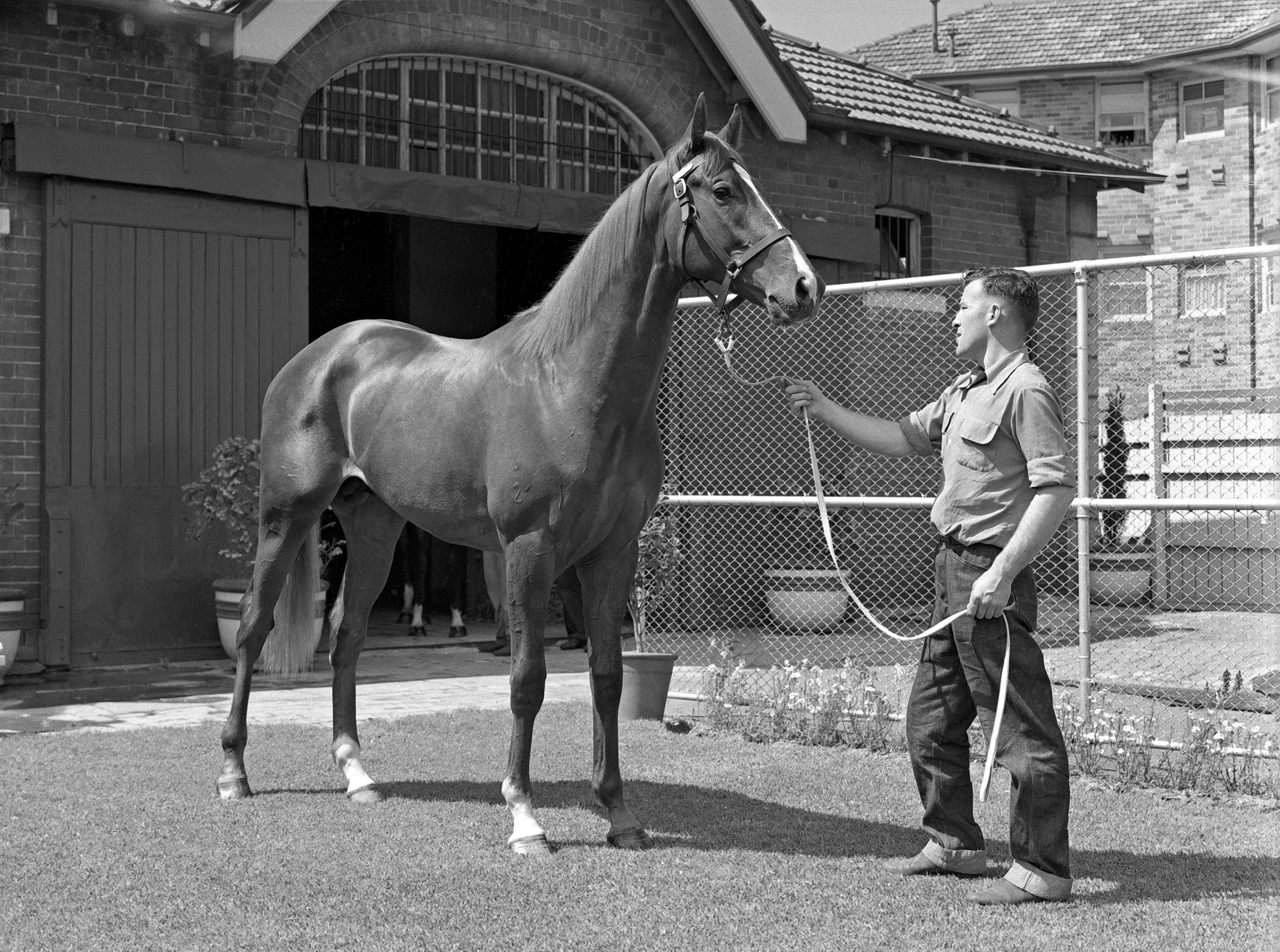
Aboukir, 1954 winner

== History ==
The race is named after the Maribyrnong River, which is in close proximity to the Flemington racetrack. The river has often flooded the racetrack as was the case in 1974 and 2014.

Prior to 1995 as well as 2007–08 the race was held on the first day of the VRC Spring Carnival, Victoria Derby Day.

The following horses have captured the Maribyrnong Plate – Golden Slipper Stakes double: Fine and Dandy (1958), Vain (1968), Baguette (1969), Canny Lad (1989).

=== Distance ===
- 1871–1971 - 5 furlongs (~1000 metres)
- 1972–1993 – 1000 metres
- 1994 – 1200 metres
- 1995 – 1100 metres
- 1996 onwards - 1000 metres

=== Grade ===
- 1871–1978 - Principal Race
- 1979–2004 - Group 2
- 2005 onwards - Group 3

=== 1954 racebook ===
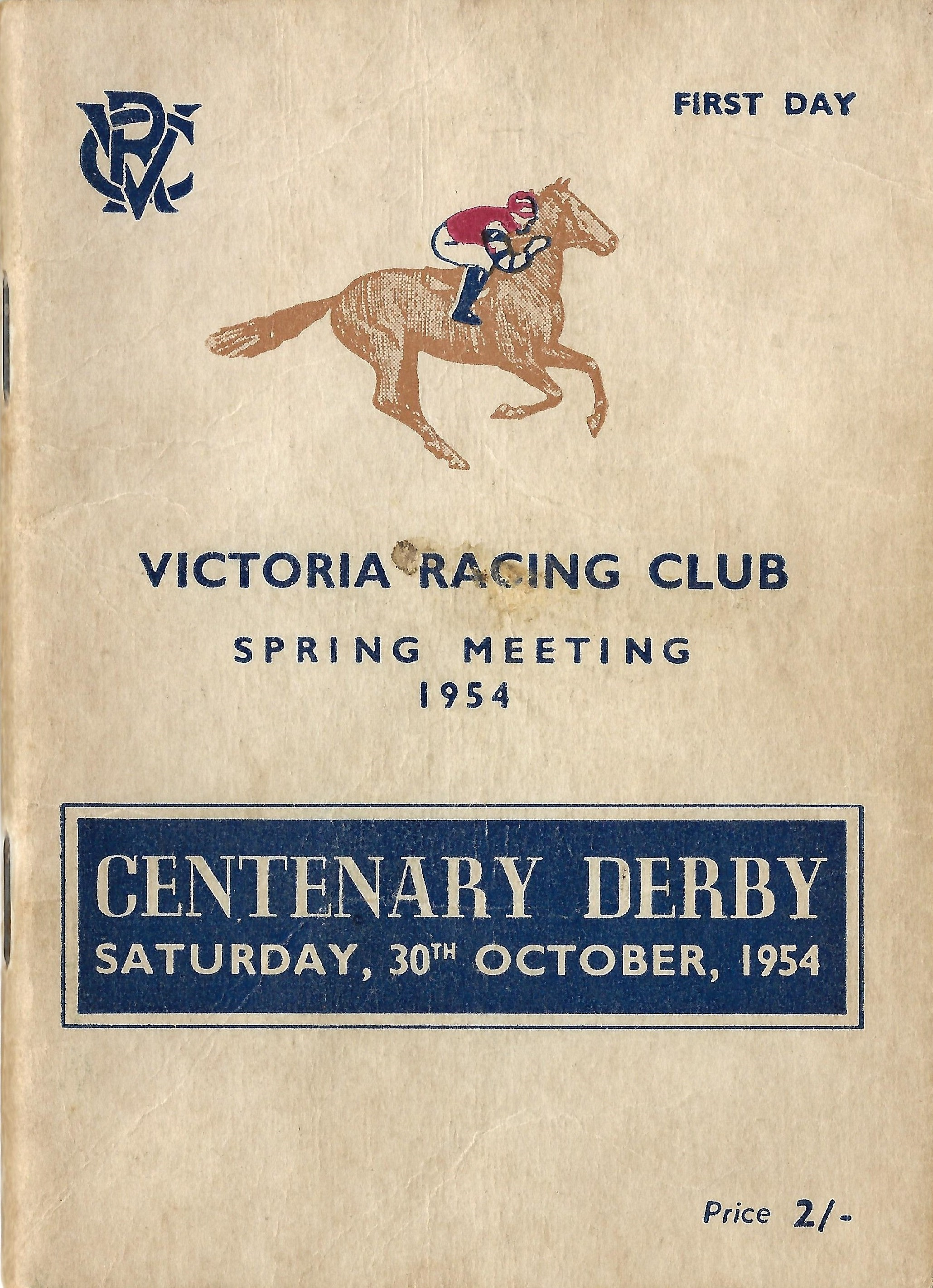
1954 VRC Derby racebook front cover

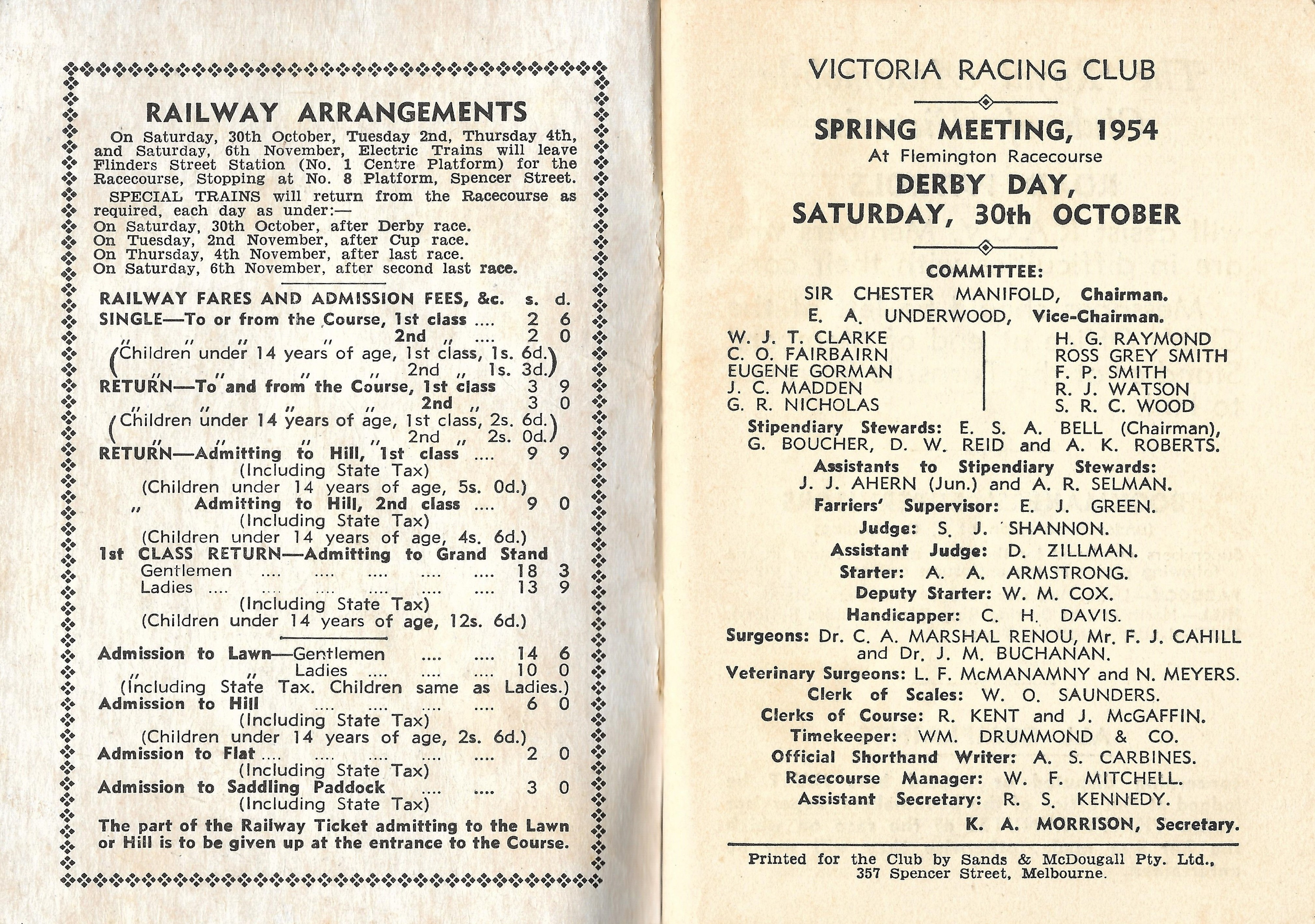
1954 VRC Derby raceday officials

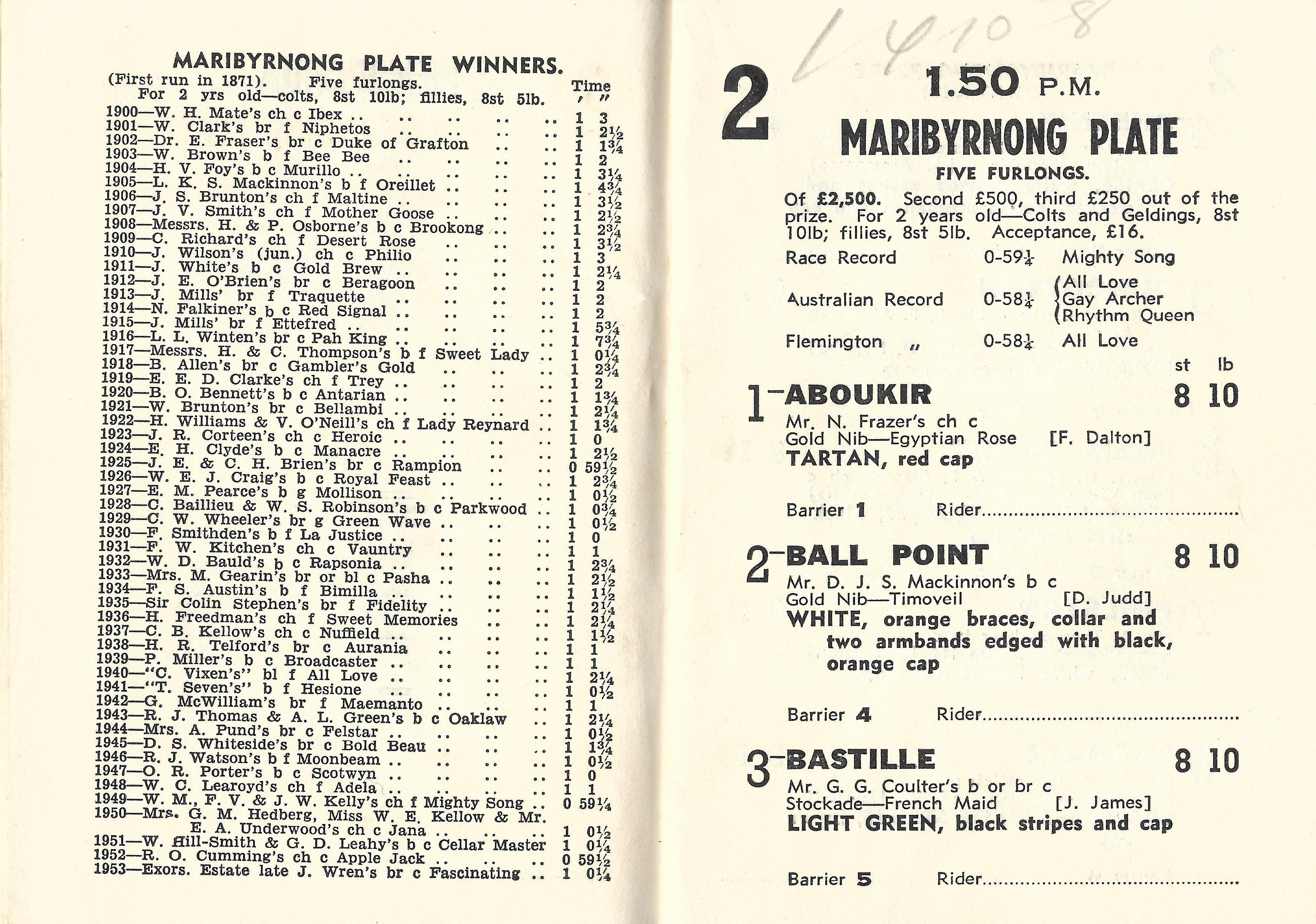
1954 VRC Maribyrnong Plate page starters and results showing the winner, Aboukir

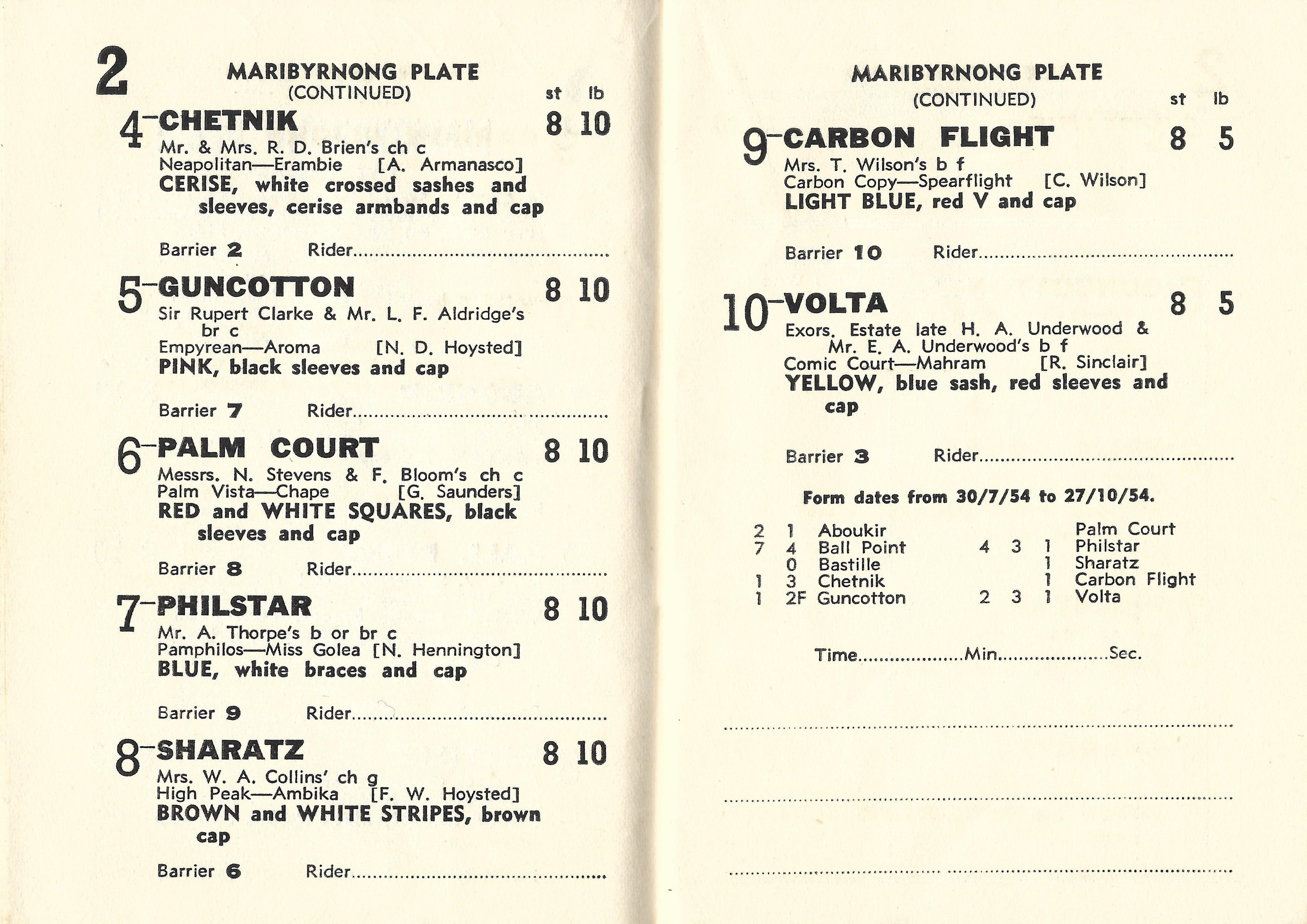
1954 VRC Maribyrnong Plate page starters and results

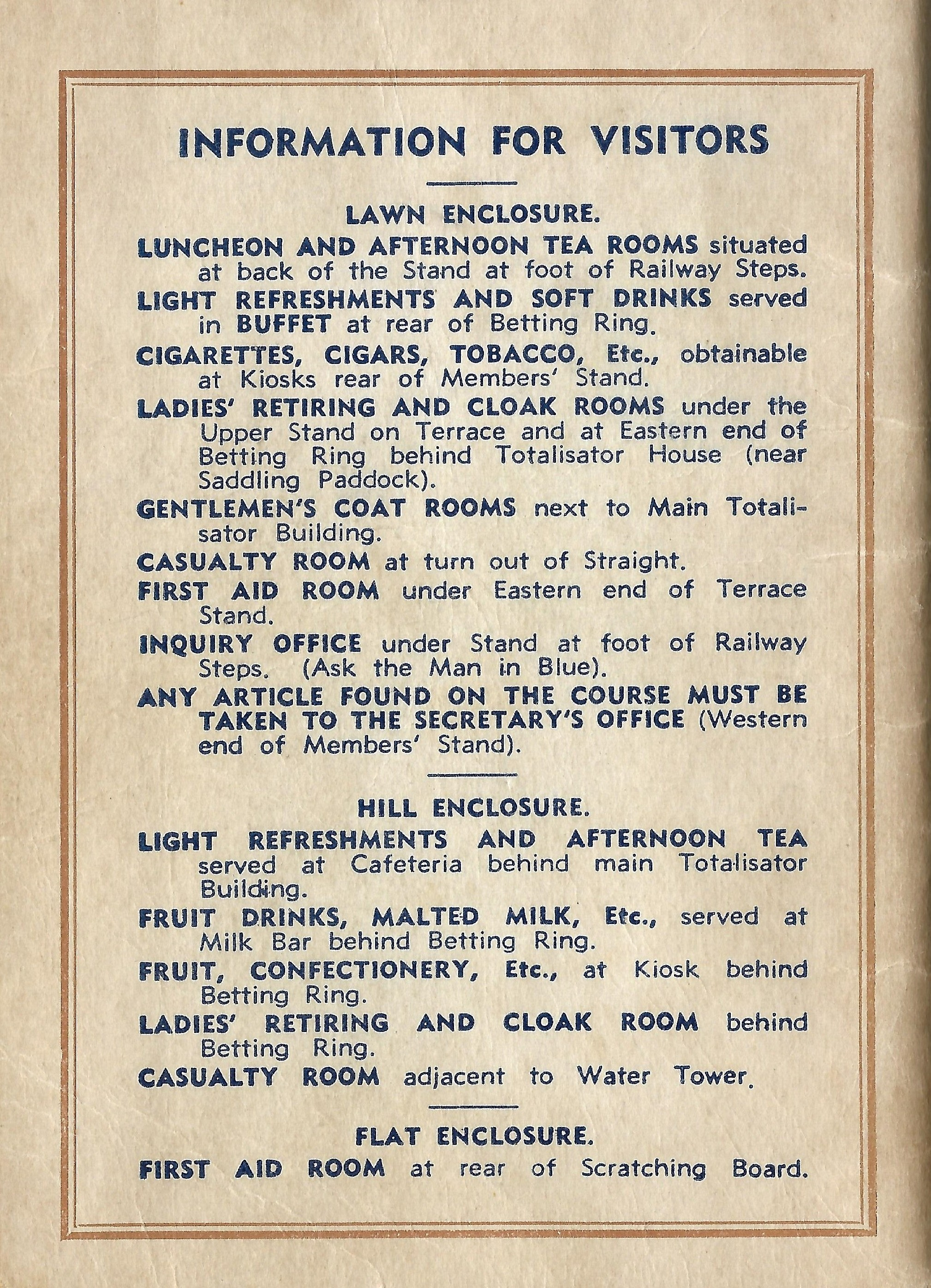
Back cover showing enclosure information for visitors

== Winners ==
The following are past winners of the race.

- 2026 - Amelia's Affair
- 2025 - Tornado Valley
- 2024 - Tycoon Star
- 2023 - Dublin Down
- 2022 - Krakarib
- 2021 - Brereton
- 2020 - Finance Tycoon
- 2019 - Hard Landing
- 2018 - Vinicunca
- 2017 - Run Naan
- 2016 - Aspect
- 2015 - Power Trip
- 2014 - Prompt Return
- 2013 - Boomwaa
- 2012 - Direct Charge
- 2011 - Real Stolle
- 2010 - Arctic Command
- 2009 - General Truce
- 2008 - Our Joan Of Arc
- 2007 - Exceedingly Good
- 2006 - Husson Lightning
- 2005 - Nadeem
- 2004 - Jiang
- 2003 - Sanziro
- 2002 - Ra Sun
- 2001 - Bel Esprit
- 2000 - Langoustine
- 1999 - Happy Giggle
- 1998 - Testa Rossa
- 1997 - Catnipped
- 1996 - Lady Of The Pines
- 1995 - Flavour
- 1994 - Exclusive Halo
- 1993 - Tennessee Morn
- 1992 - The Heavyweight
- 1991 - Catchfire
- 1990 - Raise A Rhythm
- 1989 - Canny Lad
- 1988 - Show County
- 1987 - Sculpture's Blue
- 1986 - Rancho Ruler
- 1985 - Lord Mornington
- 1984 - New Atlantis
- 1983 - Martec
- 1982 - Brave Show
- 1981 - Rancher
- 1980 - Fire Thunder
- 1979 - King Zavata
- 1978 - Star Shower
- 1977 - Peeping
- 1976 - Blazing Saddles
- 1975 - Aqua D'Oro
- 1974 - Caboul
- 1973 - Scamanda
- 1972 - New Gleam
- 1971 - Friar's Joy
- 1970 - Captain Hayes
- 1969 - Baguette
- 1968 - Vain
- 1967 - Biscay
- 1966 - Birthright
- 1965 - Very Merry
- 1964 - King Star
- 1963 - L'Orage Boy
- 1962 - Heirloom
- 1961 - Jan's Image
- 1960 - Native Statesman
- 1959 - Dalai
- 1958 - Fine And Dandy
- 1957 - Sandhurst
- 1956 - Concert Star
- 1955 - Starover
- 1954 - Aboukir
- 1953 - Fascinating
- 1952 - Apple Jack
- 1951 - Cellar Master
- 1950 - Jana
- 1949 - Mighty Song
- 1948 - Adela
- 1947 - Scotwyn
- 1946 - Moonbeam
- 1945 - Bold Beau
- 1944 - Felstar
- 1943 - Oaklaw
- 1942 - Maemanto
- 1941 - Hesione
- 1940 - All Love
- 1939 - Broadcaster
- 1938 - Aurania
- 1937 - Nuffield
- 1936 - Sweet Memories
- 1935 - Fidelity
- 1934 - Bimilla
- 1933 - Pasha
- 1932 - Rapsonia
- 1931 - Vauntry
- 1930 - La Justice
- 1929 - Green Wave
- 1928 - Parkwood
- 1927 - Mollison
- 1926 - Royal Feast
- 1925 - Rampion
- 1924 - Manacre
- 1923 - Heroic
- 1922 - Lady Reynard
- 1921 - Bellambi
- 1920 - Antarian
- 1919 - Trey
- 1918 - Gambler's Gold
- 1917 - Sweet Lady
- 1916 - Pah King
- 1915 - Ettefred
- 1914 - Red Signal
- 1913 - Traquette
- 1912 - Beragoon
- 1911 - Gold Brew
- 1910 - Philio
- 1909 - Desert Rose
- 1908 - Brookong
- 1907 - Mother Goose
- 1906 - Maltine
- 1905 - Oreillet
- 1904 - Murillo
- 1903 - Bee Bee
- 1902 - Duke Of Grafton
- 1901 - Niphetos
- 1900 - Ibex
- 1899 - Finland
- 1898 - Scorn
- 1897 - Lady Mostyn
- 1896 - Keera
- 1895 - Newhaven
- 1894 - Arihi
- 1893 - Dreamland
- 1892 - The Sailor Prince
- 1891 - Etra Weenie
- 1890 - Yarran
- 1889 - The Admiral
- 1888 - Necklet
- 1887 - Lonsdale
- 1886 - Hortense
- 1885 - Acme
- 1884 - Newstead
- 1883 - Iolanthe
- 1882 - Narina
- 1881 - Segenhoe
- 1880 - † Lavinia / Welcome Jack
- 1879 - Palmyra
- 1878 - Nellie
- 1877 - Vulcan
- 1876 - Habena
- 1875 - Newminster
- 1874 - Maid Of All Work
- 1873 - Stockbridge
- 1872 - Dagmar
- 1871 - Argus Scandal

† Dead heat

== See also ==
- Hong Kong Jockey Club Stakes
- Melbourne Cup
- VRC Oaks
- List of Australian Group races
- VRC Stakes day
- Melbourne Spring Racing Carnival
- Thoroughbred racing in Australia
- Group races
