= All Too Hard =

Australian thoroughbred racehorse

- Sire: Casino Prince
- Grandsire: Flying Spur
- Dam: Helsinge
- Damsire: Desert Sun
- Sex: Stallion
- Foaled: 21 September 2009
- Country: Australia
- Colour: Bay
- Breeder: Gilgai Farm (AUS)
- Owner: Nathan Tinkler (2012); Vinery Stud (2013 onwards)
- Trainer: Michael, Wayne and John Hawkes
- Jockey: Dwayne Dunn
- Record: 12: 7–2–1
- Earnings: AU$2,288,200

Major wins
- VRC Sires' Produce Stakes (2012); Pago Pago Stakes (2012); Caulfield Guineas (2012); C F Orr Stakes (2013); Futurity Stakes (2013); All Aged Stakes (2013)

Awards
- Australian Champion Three Year Old Colt/Gelding (2013)

All Too Hard (foaled 21 September 2009) is a four time Group 1 winning Australian thoroughbred racehorse. He is also a successful breeding stallion having sired numerous stakes winners.

== Background ==
Bred by Gilgai Farm, All Too Hard is a half brother to undefeated sprinter Black Caviar, with both horses having the same mother in Helsinge.

All Too Hard was sold at the 2011 Inglis Easter yearling sale for AU$1,025,000. He was purchased by Wayne and Michael and John Hawkes for Nathan Tinkler's Patinack Farm.

== Racing career ==
=== 2011/12: two-year-old season ===
All Too Hard's first race was on the 18 February 2012 at Flemington in the Listed Talindert Stakes. His debut gained much media attention due to his relationship to Black Caviar. He won the race by 1.5 lengths and co-trainer Wayne Hawkes commented after the race, "There is always a fair bit of pressure on the horse and everyone is looking at him. It was a nice little race for him and it is onwards and upwards from here."

Three weeks later he raced again at Flemington in the VRC Sires' Produce Stakes. He settled back in the field before producing a dazzling turn of foot under the guidance of jockey Dwayne Dunn to win by a comfortable four lengths.

He then made it three wins from as many starts in the Pago Pago Stakes at Rosehill. After comfortably hitting the front in the home straight, he was eased right down on the line to win by a length as the $1.35 favourite. Such was the ease of the victory, bookmakers immediately elevated him to Golden Slipper favouritism.

However, trainer John Hawkes sent a shockwave through racing circles by announcing the horse would not line up in the $3.5 million Golden Slipper, but would wait an extra week for the $500,000 AJC Sires' Produce. Hawkes said, "The horse is fine but the horse comes first and we decided to wait for the Sires. That's it in a nutshell."

The Sires' Produce worked out to be what some billed as a match race between All Too Hard ($1.65 favourite) and the fellow unbeaten colt Pierro ($3.20). All Too Hard tasted defeat for the first time running second behind Pierro.

=== 2012/13: three-year-old season ===
On the 18 August 2012, All Too Hard resumed in the San Domenico Stakes at Randwick as a $2.15 favourite. He began slowly out of the barriers and was quickly hampered by another runner. Once straightening, he only passed a few runners to finish in third placing.

After finishing unplaced in both The Run To The Rose and the George Main Stakes, All Too Hard returned to Melbourne and contested the Caulfield Guineas. He started at the odds of $12 behind unbeaten horse Pierro who was looking for his ninth consecutive victory. Pierro who started the $1.20 favourite jumped from the barriers awkwardly and jockey Nash Rawiller was forced to work overtime to be up with the leaders. All Too Hard sat back in the field and was able to come with a well-timed run and overhauled Pierro in the last few strides.

All Too Hard next contested the 2012 Cox Plate at Moonee Valley. Due to the weight-for-age conditions the horse was allocated 49.5kg, therefore regular rider Dwayne Dunn was replaced by the lightweight Chris Munce. Munce settled him near the leaders and used the 8kg weight advantage to dash clear at the turn, however he was run down late to finish second by a neck margin to Ocean Park, with Pierro a further three lengths back in third position. Munce said after the race, "He raced a lot closer than I expected but he also began a lot better too, so I was happy to let him travel up a bit closer with no weight on his back. He travelled like the winner, and when he shot through off the corner I thought he was going to be hard to beat."

A month after his Cox Plate defeat, All Too Hard was sold by Nathan Tinkler to Vinery Stud for a reported $25 million. Vinery Stud announced that the horse would continue to race under trainer John Hawkes.

On the 9 February 2013, All Too Hard was successful in the C F Orr Stakes at Caulfield when the $2.25 favourite. This would prove to be his second Group 1 victory. He then won back-to-back Group 1's in the Futurity Stakes and All Aged Stakes. After his victory in the All Aged Stakes, Vinery Stud announced that the horse would be retired from racing and commence duties as a stallion at their stud.

== Stud career ==
A $66,000 service fee was set for All Too Hard's first year of stud duty.

His first crop hit the racetrack in 2015/16 and he became the equal Champion First Season Sire by winners. In 2018 he was the Leading Second Season Sire by winners.

As of 2021 he has sired 34 Stakes performers including four Group 1 winners. Progeny earnings are over $26.6 million in earnings from only 4 crops of racing. He also has a high 63% winners to runners strike rate.

=== Notable stock ===
All Too Hard Group 1 winners:

c = colt, f = filly, g = gelding

Foaled	Name	Sex	Major wins
2015	Behemoth	g	Memsie Stakes (twice), Sir Rupert Clarke Stakes
2016	Alligator Blood	g	Australian Guineas, Stradbroke Handicap, Underwood Stakes (twice), Champions Mile, Futurity Stakes, The Might and Power
2016	Wellington	g	Chairman's Sprint Prize (twice), Queen's Silver Jubilee Cup, Hong Kong Sprint
2017	Forbidden Love	f	Surround Stakes, Canterbury Stakes, George Ryder Stakes
2020	Stefi Magnetica	f	Stradbroke Handicap, Doncaster Mile

== Pedigree ==
Pedigree of All Too Hard (AUS) 2009
Sire Casino Prince (AUS) 2003	Flying Spur (AUS); 1992	Danehill	Danzig
Sire Casino Prince (AUS) 2003	Flying Spur (AUS); 1992	Danehill	Razyana
Sire Casino Prince (AUS) 2003	Flying Spur (AUS); 1992	Rolls	Mr. Prospector
Sire Casino Prince (AUS) 2003	Flying Spur (AUS); 1992	Rolls	Grand Luxe
Sire Casino Prince (AUS) 2003	Lady Capel (AUS); 1993	Last Tycoon	Try My Best
Sire Casino Prince (AUS) 2003	Lady Capel (AUS); 1993	Last Tycoon	Mill Princess
Sire Casino Prince (AUS) 2003	Lady Capel (AUS); 1993	Kew Gardens	Kenmare
Sire Casino Prince (AUS) 2003	Lady Capel (AUS); 1993	Kew Gardens	Garden Green
Dam Helsinge (AUS) 2001	Desert Sun (GB); 1988	Green Desert	Danzig
Dam Helsinge (AUS) 2001	Desert Sun (GB); 1988	Green Desert	Foreign Courier
Dam Helsinge (AUS) 2001	Desert Sun (GB); 1988	Solar	Hotfoot
Dam Helsinge (AUS) 2001	Desert Sun (GB); 1988	Solar	L'anguissola
Dam Helsinge (AUS) 2001	Scandinavia (AUS); 1994	Snippets	Lunchtime
Dam Helsinge (AUS) 2001	Scandinavia (AUS); 1994	Snippets	Easy Date
Dam Helsinge (AUS) 2001	Scandinavia (AUS); 1994	Song Of Norway	Vain
Dam Helsinge (AUS) 2001	Scandinavia (AUS); 1994	Song Of Norway	Love Song
