= Pierro (horse) =

Australian Thoroughbred racehorse

- Sire: Lonhro
- Dam: Miss Rite Note (IRL)
- Damsire: Daylami (IRL)
- Sex: Stallion
- Foaled: 5 October 2009
- Country: Australia
- Colour: Bay
- Breeder: Musk Creek Farm
- Owner: G Kolivos & Mrs D Kolivos
- Trainer: Gai Waterhouse
- Record: 14:11-2-1
- Earnings: $4.5 million

Major wins
- Silver Slipper Stakes (2012); Todman Stakes (2012); Golden Slipper Stakes (2012); ATC Sires' Produce Stakes (2012); ATC Champagne Stakes (2012); The Run to the Rose (2012); Bill Stutt Stakes (2012); Hobartville Stakes (2013); Canterbury Stakes (2013); George Ryder Stakes (2013)

Pierro (foaled 5 October 2009) is a retired Australian thoroughbred racehorse and stud stallion.

Pierro was bred at Musk Creek Farm and sold for $230,000 in the Magic Millions sale. A bay horse, he stands at 16.1hh.

He had a short racing career, racing in just two seasons over distances ranging from 1200m to 2040m.

At three years of age, after just two seasons of racing, he was retired to stud at Coolmore, in Jerrys Plains of NSW, where he was purchased for $40 million.

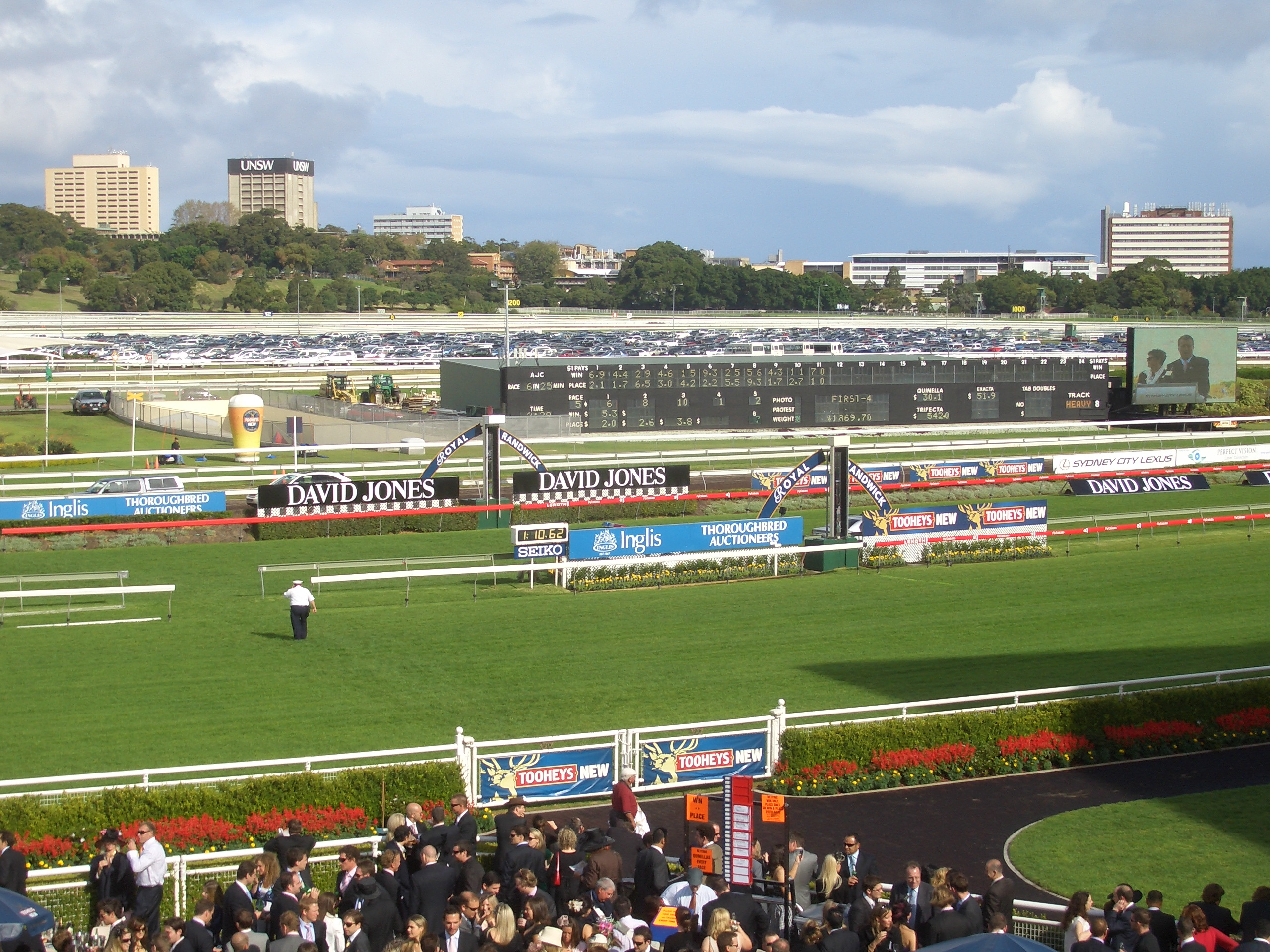
Home Track of Pierro - Randwick Racecourse

== Racing career ==
=== Two-year-old season: 2011–2012 ===
Pierro began his undefeated two-year-old season in the AJC Breeders' Plate in October 2011. He had a 5-month break before resuming in the Group 2 Silver Slipper Stakes, which he won. He then ran in the Group 2 Spotless Todman Stakes, which secured him a place in the Group 1 Golden Slipper. Pierro started the slipper as a $6.50 chance, with the favourite Samaready coming in third to Pierro. With a convincing win in the slipper, his record went to four unbeaten starts, making him the champion two-year-old colt of the season.

From here, Pierro went on to run in the Group 1 Inglis Sires Produce Stakes, where he started as second favorite behind the also unbeaten colt All Too Hard, where he notched up another win. The last race of his season, the Group 1 Moet & Chandon Champagne Stakes, where he started as $1.22 favorite. He finished with another win, finishing off his unbeaten two-year-old season with an unprecedented 6 wins from 6 starts in very competitive races, including the "Triple Crown" for two-year-olds.

=== Three-year-old season: 2012–2013 ===
After the champagne stakes, Pierro was spelled for 5 months before resuming with the Run to the Rose at Rosehill. Starting as a $1.53 favourite, it was no surprise that Pierro added yet another win to his record. Following this, it was decided that he would be sent to Victoria, in the hopes of winning either the Caulfield Guineas or the Cox Plate, both races longer in distance compared to his usual race length. The first Victoria race Pierro raced in was the City Jeep Bill Stutt Stakes at Moonee Valley, a Group 2 race which he won after starting as a $1.06 favourite. Following this was the Guineas, and with the step up in distance Pierro couldn't quite get there and managed a second place in this race. It was then back to the Valley for Pierro to have a run in the Cox Plate. A big step up in distance from his usual sprinting distances up to the 2040m distance. Proving too much for the horse, he still ran a convincing third, an admirable achievement for a sprinting horse.

After the Victoria trip Pierro was sent back to NSW for a spell in preparation for the Sydney Autumn Carnival, one, which like his two-year-old season, he would dominate. Another 5-month spell proved ideal for Pierro, and he returned fresh in the Group 2 Hobartville Stakes with a win back at his usual distance. It was then on to the Cellarbrations Canterbury Stakes, with another Group 1 win under his belt. He then geared up for the prestigious George Ryder Stakes, where as the $1.36 favourite he won yet again. Pierro's final race was the famous BMW Doncaster. Over the longer distance and heavy track he ran second to Sacred Falls. Following this, the owners decided to retire him to stud. He was then sold to Coolmore stud, in a deal rumoured to be worth $30 million.

His race record stands at 14 starts for 11 wins (including 5 Group 1), 2 seconds, and one third. His longest winning streak was 8 in a row. He had a winning strike rate of 78.6% and a place rate of 100%. He was the highest rated Australian juvenile since 1977 and the highest-rated 3yo sprinter in the world in 2013.

=== Race record ===
Two-year-old season: 2011–2012
Date	Result	Race	Venue	Distance	Group	Prizemoney	Weight	Time	Jockey	Winner/2nd
1 October 2011	Won	Breeders' Plate	Randwick	1000m	LR	$60,000	56 kg	00:58.81	Nash Rawiller	Hidden Warrior
3 March 2012	Won	Silver Slipper Stakes	Rosehill	1100m	G2	$120,000	56.5 kg	01:06.80	Nash Rawiller	Hussousa
24 March 2012	Won	Spotless Todman Stakes	Rosehill	1200m	G2	$180,000	55.5 kg	01:12.14	Nash Rawiller	Epaulette
7 April 2012	Won	Aami Golden Slipper	Rosehill	1200m	G1	$2M	56.5 kg	01:09.74	Nash Rawiller	Snitzerland
14 April 2012	Won	Inglis Sires Produce Stakes	Randwick	1400m	G1	$300,000	56.5 kg	01:21.47	Nash Rawiller	All Too Hard
28 April 2012	Won	Moet & Chandon Champagne Stakes	Randwick	1600m	G1	$240,000	56.5 kg	01:35.03	Nash Rawiller	Dear Demi

Three-year-old season: 2012–2013
Date	Result	Race	Venue	Distance	Group	Prizemoney	Weight	Time	Jockey	Winner/2nd
1 September 2012	Won	The Run To The Rose	Rosehill	1200m	G3	$75,000	60 kg	01:09.86	Nash Rawiller	Your Song
28 September 2012	Won	City Jeep Bill Stutt Stakes	Moonee Valley	1600m	G2	$132,000	57 kg	01:36.31	Nash Rawiller	Massive Impact
13 October 2012	2nd	Beck Caulfield Guineas	Caulfield	1600m	G1	$180,000	56.5 kg	01:36.05	Nash Rawiller	All Too Hard
27 October 2012	3rd	W. S. Cox Plate	Moonee Valley	2040m	G1	$220,000	49.5 kg	02:04.14	Corey Brown	Ocean Park
3 March 2013	Won	Hobartville Stakes	Rosehill	1400m	G2	$120,000	56.5 kg	01:24.75	Nash Rawiller	Rebel Dane
23 March 2013	Won	Cellarbrations Canterbury Stakes	Rosehill	1300m	G1	$210,000	56 kg	01:15.99	Jim Cassidy	More Joyous
6 April 2013	Won	Daily Telegraph George Ryder Stakes	Rosehill	1500m	G1	$240,000	56.5 kg	01:31.08	Nash Rawiller	Mufhasa
20 April 2013	2nd	BMW Doncaster	Randwick	1600m	G1	$400,000	57 kg	01:37.99	Nash Rawiller	Sacred Falls

== Stud record ==
Pierro's first crop at Coolmore began running in 2017, with 3 Group 1 winning horses coming from it. His stud fee was $88,000 for 2019, at the time the 3rd most expensive stallion at Coolmore in Australia.

=== Notable progeny ===
Pierro Group 1 winning progeny
Foaled	Name	Sex	Major wins
2014	Levendi	Colt	Australian Derby, Tulloch Stakes (G2)
2014	Pierata	Colt	All Aged Stakes (G1)
2014	Pinot	Filly	VRC Oaks
2014	Forore	Gelding	Hong Kong Derby, Hong Kong Classic Mile
2015	Arcadia Queen	Filly	Kingston Town Classic (G1), West Australian Guineas (G2), Caulfield Stakes, Mackinnon Stakes
2015	Regal Power	Gelding	Railway Stakes, Kingston Town Classic
2016	Shadow Hero	Gelding	Spring Champion Stakes, Randwick Guineas

== Pedigree ==
He was from the fifth crop of the champion racehorse and stallion Lonhro out of the dam Miss Rite Note (IRE)(by Daylami). His dam sire Daylami's line also been traditionally strong with multiple Group 1 winners.

Pedigree of Pierro (AUS) - 2009
Sire Lonhro (AUS) - 1998	Octagonal(NZ) - 1992	Zabeel (NZ) - 1986	Sir Tristram (IRE) - 1971
Sire Lonhro (AUS) - 1998	Octagonal(NZ) - 1992	Zabeel (NZ) - 1986	Lady Giselle (FR) - 1982
Sire Lonhro (AUS) - 1998	Octagonal(NZ) - 1992	Eight Carat (GB) - 1975	Pieces Of Eight (IRE) - 1963
Sire Lonhro (AUS) - 1998	Octagonal(NZ) - 1992	Eight Carat (GB) - 1975	Klairessa (GB) - 1969
Sire Lonhro (AUS) - 1998	Shadea (NZ) - 1988	Straight Strike (USA) - 1977	Mr. Prospector (USA) - 1970
Sire Lonhro (AUS) - 1998	Shadea (NZ) - 1988	Straight Strike (USA) - 1977	Bend Not (USA) - 1972
Sire Lonhro (AUS) - 1998	Shadea (NZ) - 1988	Concia (NZ) - 1978	First Consul (USA) - 1970
Sire Lonhro (AUS) - 1998	Shadea (NZ) - 1988	Concia (NZ) - 1978	My Tricia (NZ) - 1974
Dam Miss Rite Note (IRE) - 2003	Daylami (IRE) - 1994	Doyoun (IRE) - 1985	Mill Reef (USA) - 1968
Dam Miss Rite Note (IRE) - 2003	Daylami (IRE) - 1994	Doyoun (IRE) - 1985	Dumka (FR) - 1971
Dam Miss Rite Note (IRE) - 2003	Daylami (IRE) - 1994	Daltawa (IRE) - 1989	Miswaki (USA) - 1978
Dam Miss Rite Note (IRE) - 2003	Daylami (IRE) - 1994	Daltawa (IRE) - 1989	Damana (FR) - 1981
Dam Miss Rite Note (IRE) - 2003	Sky Song (IRE) - 1997	Sadler's Wells (USA) - 1981	Northern Dancer (CAN) - 1961
Dam Miss Rite Note (IRE) - 2003	Sky Song (IRE) - 1997	Sadler's Wells (USA) - 1981	Fairy Bridge (USA) - 1975
Dam Miss Rite Note (IRE) - 2003	Sky Song (IRE) - 1997	Criquette (GB) - 1990	Shirley Heights (GB) - 1975
Dam Miss Rite Note (IRE) - 2003	Sky Song (IRE) - 1997	Criquette (GB) - 1990	Ghisliane (USA) - 1981

== Pierro Plate ==
In 2018 a race for 2 year old horses was named after Pierro. It is an 1100m race, and it is run at Royal Randwick in the middle of February, and is a lead up race for the Golden Slipper.

== See also ==
- Coolmore Stud
- Gai Waterhouse
