= Challenge Stakes =

Challenge Stakes may refer to one of several horse races:

- Challenge Stakes (Great Britain), a flat horse race in Great Britain
- Challenge Stakes (ATC), a thoroughbred horse race in Australia
- Challenge Stakes (New Zealand), a thoroughbred horse race in New Zealand, currently called the Proisir Plate
- Challenge Stakes (Ireland), a horse race in Ireland
