= Zephyr Bay =

Australian-bred Thoroughbred racehorse

- Sire: Biscay
- Grandsire: Star Kingdom
- Dam: Heavenly Wind
- Damsire: Pan II
- Sex: Stallion
- Foaled: 1970
- Country: Australia
- Colour: Brown
- Breeder: Lionel Israel
- Owner: Marvel Miller
- Trainer: Bert Lyell, Cyril Kearns
- Record: 22: 9-6-2
- Earnings: A$67,510

Major wins
- Oakleigh Plate (1975); Challenge Stakes (1975); Expressway Stakes (1975)

Zephyr Bay (1 September 1970 – 15 April 1995) was an Australian Thoroughbred racehorse and stallion.

An outstanding sprinter in the mid 1970s, Zephyr Bay retired to stud in 1975 with 9 wins including the VATC Oakleigh Plate, AJC Challenge Stakes and AJC Expressway Stakes. He held the 1000m Randwick course record for 35 years.

== Breeding ==
Zephyr Bay was bred by Lionel Israel at his Segenhoe Stud near Scone in New South Wales. He was born in 1970 from the first crop of the Star Kingdom stallion Biscay, out of the Pan II mare Heavenly Wind.

Zephyr Bay was purchased by horse trainer Bert Lyell on behalf of Bob Miller at the Inglis Easter Yearling Sale in 1972 for $16,000.00.

== Racing career ==
Coal black and brilliantly fast Zephyr Bay became known as the "black flash" winning top sprint races and setting numerous course records. He was often ridden throughout his career by Grahame Horselman and Roy Higgins.

Zephyr Bay raced as a two-year-old in the 1972/73 season under trainer Bert Lyell. He won twice before coming in second to Imagele in the STC Todman Stakes. In the STC Todman Stakes Zephyr Bay suffered from a splint under his knee and was sent out to spell.

After spending almost 12 months spelling, Zephyr Bay came back into the care of trainer Cyril Kearns, Bert Lyell having died. The highlights of his three-year-old career were second placings in the STC George Ryder Stakes and the AJC Galaxy.

Zephyr Bay's four-year-old season during 1974/75 proved to be the peak of his racing career. He achieved victories in the AJC Challenge Stakes, followed by the AJC Expressway Stakes and culminating in the Group 1 VATC Oakleigh Plate. Setting a course record in each win. The course record Zephyr Bay set winning the AJC Challenge Stakes would last 35 years until 2010.

Zephyr Bay's final race was in the AJC Galaxy where he injured a tendon and was retired from racing.

== Stud record ==
In 1975, Zephyr Bay was retired to stud in New Zealand. First standing at Balcarres Stud at Matamata, later Waikato Stud before being repatriated to Australia in 1987 to stand at Carrington Stud in the Hunter Valley and then Great Missenden Stud in Victoria. Zephyr Bay, although hampered by poor fertility proved an exceptional sire. He sired only 250 foals over 17 years at stud and produced 141 winners from 181 runners (78%), 22 stakes winners (12%), and 7 Group 1 winners (4%). Among his top performers were:

- Zephyr Zip (AJC Sires Produce Stakes)
- Judena (WRC New Zealand St. Leger)
- Glamour Bay (WRC New Zealand Oaks)
- Broad Reach (BATC Doomben One Hundred Thousand)
- Full & By (AJC Champagne Stakes)
- Zepherin (WRC New Zealand Oaks)
- Elounda Bay (VRC Newmarket Handicap)
- Society Bay (VRC Edward Manifold Stakes)

== Pedigree ==
Pedigree of Zephyr Bay (AUS), brown stallion, 1970
Sire Biscay Ch. 1965	Star Kingdom (IRE); Ch. 1946	Stardust	Hyperion
Sire Biscay Ch. 1965	Star Kingdom (IRE); Ch. 1946	Stardust	Sister Stella
Sire Biscay Ch. 1965	Star Kingdom (IRE); Ch. 1946	Impromptu	Concerto
Sire Biscay Ch. 1965	Star Kingdom (IRE); Ch. 1946	Impromptu	Thoughtless
Sire Biscay Ch. 1965	Magic Symbol (AUS); 1956	Makarpura	Big Game
Sire Biscay Ch. 1965	Magic Symbol (AUS); 1956	Makarpura	Cap d'Or
Sire Biscay Ch. 1965	Magic Symbol (AUS); 1956	Magic Wonder	Newtown Wonder
Sire Biscay Ch. 1965	Magic Symbol (AUS); 1956	Magic Wonder	Conveyor
Dam Heavenly Wind (AUS) B. 1958	Pan II (FR); 1947	Atys	Asterus
Dam Heavenly Wind (AUS) B. 1958	Pan II (FR); 1947	Atys	Esclarmonde
Dam Heavenly Wind (AUS) B. 1958	Pan II (FR); 1947	Pretty Girl	Tourbillon
Dam Heavenly Wind (AUS) B. 1958	Pan II (FR); 1947	Pretty Girl	Princess Wazara
Dam Heavenly Wind (AUS) B. 1958	Perilla (FR); 1945	Ringmaster	Colorado
Dam Heavenly Wind (AUS) B. 1958	Perilla (FR); 1945	Ringmaster	Vervelle
Dam Heavenly Wind (AUS) B. 1958	Perilla (FR); 1945	Minga	Limond
Dam Heavenly Wind (AUS) B. 1958	Perilla (FR); 1945	Minga	Motley
