= High Caste =

New Zealand-bred Thoroughbred racehorse

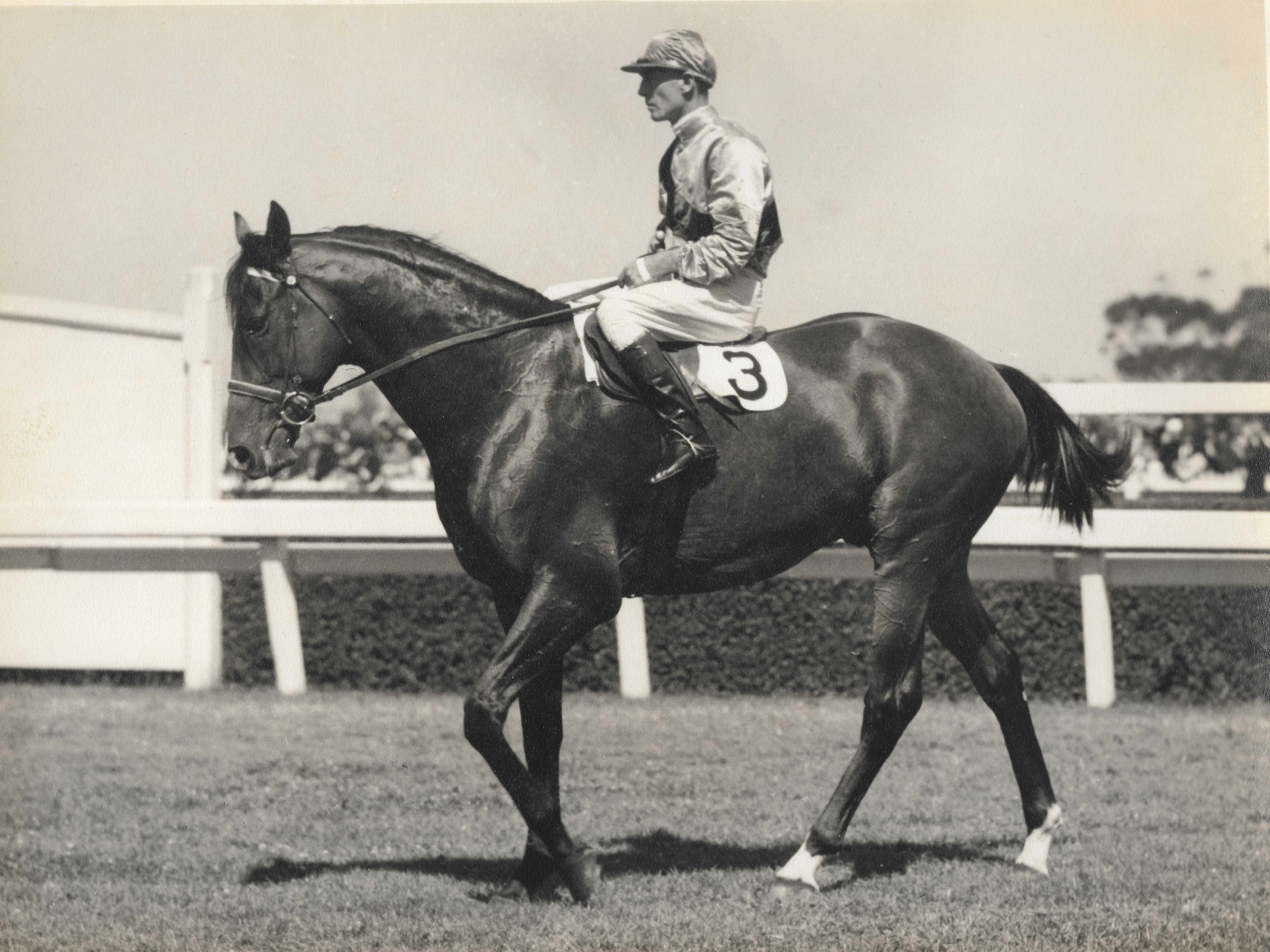
- High Caste and Ted Bartle
- Sire: Bulandshar (GB)
- Grandsire: Blandford
- Dam: The Begum
- Damsire: Chief Ruler (GB)
- Sex: Stallion
- Foaled: 1936
- Country: New Zealand
- Colour: Bay
- Breeder: A.J. McGovern
- Owner: Harry Tancred
- Trainer: J.T. Jamieson (NZ)
- Record: 72: 35 (3 dh); 19,7
- Earnings: £35,547

Major wins
- Ascot Vale Stakes (1939); VRC Sires Produce Stakes (1939); Champagne Stakes (1939); Hobartville Stakes (1939); Rosehill Guineas (1939); Craven Plate (1939); Caulfield Guineas (1939); C.B.Fisher Plate (1939,1940,1941); Caulfield Stakes (1939,1940); Linlithgow Stakes (1939,1940,1941); Epsom Handicap (1940); Challenge Stakes (1940,1942); St George Stakes (1940,1942); C F Orr Stakes (1940); Hill Stakes (1941); VATC Futurity Stakes (1941); Warwick Stakes (1941)

Honours
- Australian Racing Hall of Fame
- Last updated on 8 August 2010

High Caste was a Thoroughbred racehorse and stallion that was bred in New Zealand and was considered the best two-year-old in New Zealand after winning three of his four race starts. He was a good racehorse under handicap and weight for age conditions and combined this with wins in good races from 5 furlongs (1,000 metres) to 1 3/4 miles (2,800 m), carrying up to 10 stone 6 pounds (66 kilograms).

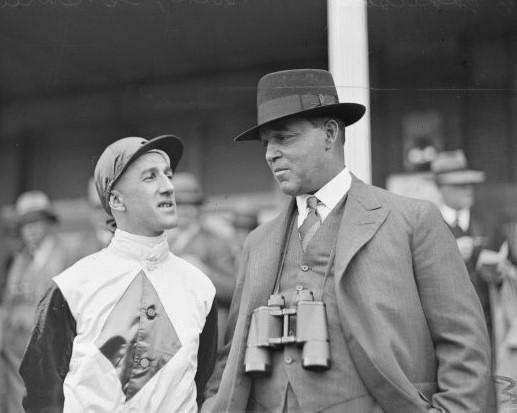
Jack Jamieson trainer.

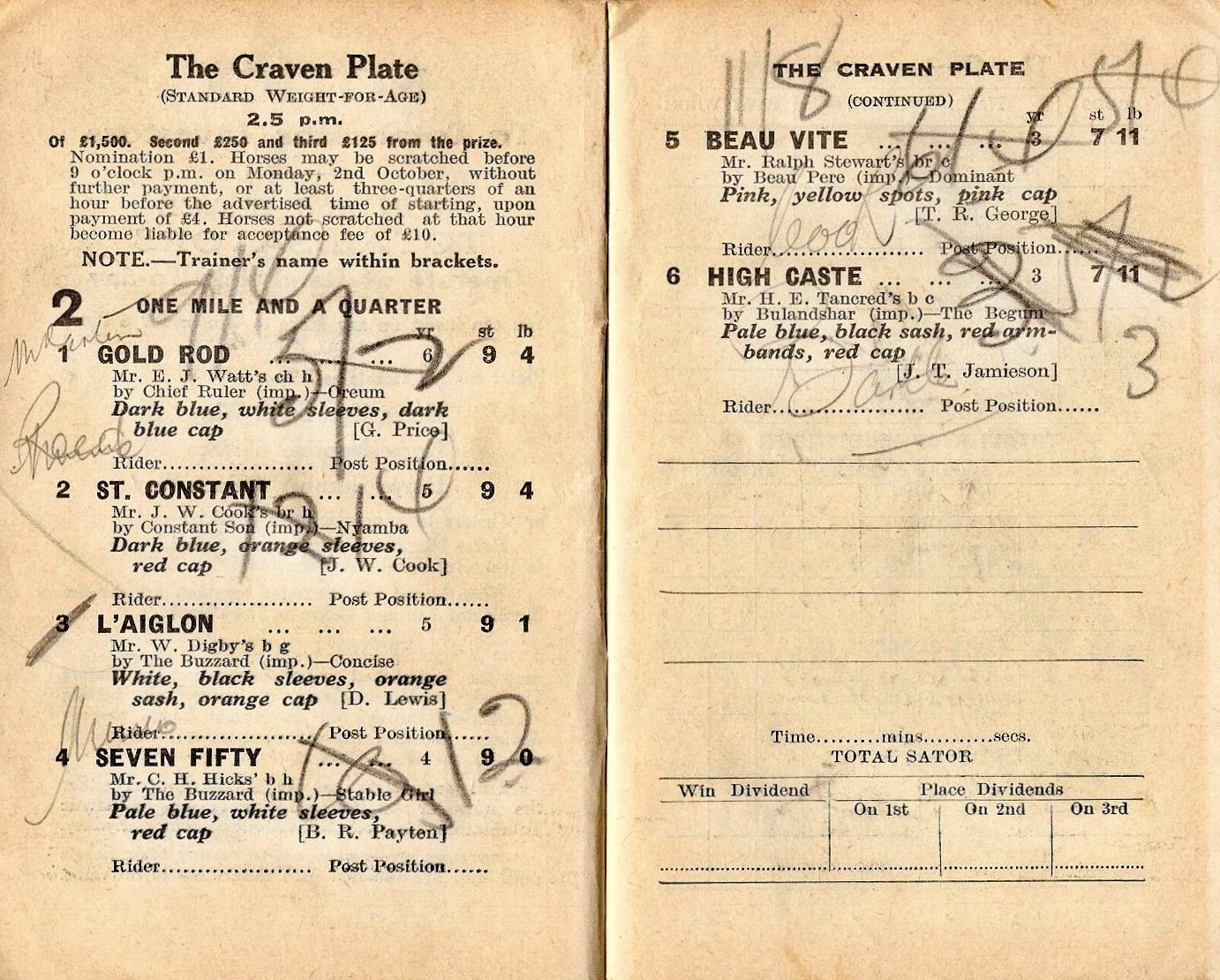
1939 AJC Craven Plate racebook showing the winner, High Caste.

He was by the racehorse and sire, Bulandshar (GB), his dam, The Begum (a sister to Rulette) was by the outstanding sire, Chief Ruler (GB). High Caste was a brother to the stakes race winners, Nawab and Nizam and a half brother to the stakes winner, Stretto by Hunting Song (IRE). He traced in the tenth generation to Cornelia (GB) who was imported with her dam, Manto into Australia in 1825. They are from family 18.

High Caste was colloquially known as the ‘Strawberry Bull’ because of a distinct grey fleck through his rich red bay coat.

== Racing record ==
=== At two years: 1938-39 ===
Racing in New Zealand High Caste won three of his first four race starts including the 1938 Auckland Racing Club (ARC) Great Northern Foal Stakes and ARC Royal Stakes. He was subsequently sold for 7,000 guineas, to the meat baron, Harry Tancred and was immediately shipped over to Melbourne to race in Australia. In Australia, High Caste won at his first three race starts for his new owner, including the 1939 Group One (G1) Ascot Vale Stakes, VRC Sires Produce Stakes plus the Champagne Stakes (G1). He was defeated in the Fairfield Handicap before placing second in the G1, AJC Sires Produce Stakes. High Caste had ten starts as a two-year-old (2yo) for seven wins, one second and a third placing. He was then acclaimed to be the best two-year-old on both sides of the Tasman Sea.

=== At three years: 1939-40 ===
After returning from a spell High Caste won the G2 Hobartville Stakes, was unplaced in the Chelmsford Stakes before winning the G1 Rosehill Guineas and placing second to Reading (by a ½ head) in the AJC Derby. He then won Craven Plate, AJC Clibborn Stakes, Caulfield Guineas and Caulfield Stakes before he was unplaced in the G1 W. S. Cox Plate. High Caste placed second in the Victoria Derby before he dead-heated with Manrico in the Linlithgow Stakes before winning the C.B.Fisher Plate two days later.

In the autumn of 1940 High Caste won the Challenge Stakes in Sydney before travelling to Melbourne for wins in the C F Orr Stakes and St George Stakes. High Caste then finished second in three other stakes races in Melbourne before he returned to Sydney where he was unplaced in the AJC Doncaster Handicap before he finished second to the outstanding, Ajax in the AJC All Aged Stakes. High Caste had 21 starts as a 3yo for 11 wins, 6 seconds and 1 third placing.

=== At four years: 1940-41 ===
At his first four-year-old start High Caste won the Victoria Park Flying Handicap in Sydney before placing third in the Canterbury Stakes. High Caste won the Hawkesbury Clarendon Handicap and then won the AJC Epsom Handicap carrying 9 stone 5 pounds (59 kilograms) in a new race record time. After finishing second in the wfa Craven Plate High Caste then went to Melbourne where he won the Caulfield Stakes from Ajax by a ¾ length and equalled the course record. After a fourth in the Caulfield Cup High Caste ran second in the LKS Mackinnon Stakes on the Saturday before he dead heated with St Constant in the Yan Yean Stakes on Melbourne Cup Tuesday, then winning the G2 Linlithgow Stakes, for the second time, on VRC Oaks day. High Caste then won the C.B.Fisher Plate for the second time on the Saturday.

Following a second placing in the Williamstown Cup High Caste was spelled. In the autumn of 1941 High Caste defeated Zonda to win the VATC Futurity Stakes carrying 10 stone 6 pounds (66 kg). After a fourth placing in the VRC Newmarket Handicap carrying 10 st 2 lb (64 kg) High Caste then won the 14 furlong (2,800 m) Kings Plate five days later. Two days later he was successful in the CM Lloyd Stakes, atoning for his defeat in this race the previous year. Taken to Sydney he had four more starts for 2 seconds and 1 third before he was spelled.

=== At five years: 1941-42 ===
High Caste won the AJC Warwick Stakes first up after his spell, followed by two seconds and then a win in the Rosehill Hill Stakes. He finished second in the AJC Epsom Handicap before placing third in the Craven Plate and the Caulfield Stakes. After an unplaced run in the Cantala Stakes High Caste returned to form taking out the Linlithgow and CB Fisher Plate double for the third successive year. A spell followed before High Caste resumed racing in Sydney with a win in the Challenge Stakes then a dead heat with Mildura in the AJC Australia Day Handicap. Back in Melbourne High Caste won the St George Stakes for his fifth consecutive win. In his next two starts in Melbourne he was unplaced before he returned to Sydney where he could only manage a fourth in the Doncaster Handicap and a third in the wfa All Aged Plate.

High Caste had 72 starts and won 35 races (including 3 dead-heats), 19 seconds, 7 thirds and was unplaced in 11 races for £35,547 in prize money.

He was purchased as a five-year-old by Lionel Israel to stand at his Segenhoe Stud at Scone, New South Wales. Later he stood at T.L. Flynn’s Oakleigh Stud, Kerrabee, New South Wales.

High Caste's progeny commenced racing in the 1945-6 season. He did not sire a horse of his own ability, but still sired 9 stakes-winners that had 13 stakes-wins between them, plus many other winners in all states.

His stakes winning progeny were:

- High Jip (won VRC Newmarket Handicap etc.). Exported to USA.
- High Nymph (SAJC Morphettville Plate)
- High Sense (Wagga Wagga Gold Cup)
- Highlea (Doomben 10,000)
- Miss High Caste (VRC Australian Cup)
- Prince Aly (TTC Debutant Stakes)
- Prince Kerdeil (Canterbury Guineas)
- Sir Pilot (STC Cup, Newcastle Gold Cup etc.)
- Swinside (SAJC Morphettville Plate)
