= Ghibellines (horse) =

Australian-bred thoroughbred racehorse and stud stallion

- Sire: Shamardal (USA)
- Dam: Camarilla (Aus)
- Sex: Stallion
- Foaled: 29 August 2011
- Country: Australia
- Colour: Bay
- Breeder: Darley
- Owner: B J Anderton ONZM & Est late L E Anderton
- Trainer: Peter Snowden
- Last updated on 18 April 2026

Ghibellines (29/8/2011-26/12/2025) was an Australian Thoroughbred racehorse who won the Group 2 Todman Stakes at age 2 and went on to forge a successful career as a stud stallion with White Robe Lodge in Dunedin in the South Island of New Zealand, siring a number of Group winners.

Bred by Darley, he was a son of champion sire Shamardal and the Group One-winning Elusive Quality mare Camarilla. He was a half-brother to Guelph, a four-time group 1 winner and Dazzler, the dam of triple Group 1 winner and subsequent Group 1-producing sire Bivouac.

== Racing career ==
Ghibellines race record was:

- 1st in the Todman Stakes (Group 2, 1200m)
- 3rd in the Canonbury Stakes (Listed, 1100m)
- 4th in the NSW Thoroughbred Breeders Plate (Listed, 1000m)
- 3rd in the Danehill Stakes (Group 2, 1200m)

== Stud career ==
In 2016 Ghibellines commenced stud duties at White Robe Lodge in Mosgiel, Dunedin, New Zealand. Ghibellines produced many stakes winners, particularly in the South Island but also in Australia.

His 2025 service fee was $NZ7,000 (+ GST).

Ghibellines was sold to Chinese purchasers but in December 2025 he died with colic before being exported.

=== Notable progeny ===
c = colt, f = filly/mare, g = gelding

Foaled	Name	Sex	Dam	Damsire	Major wins
2018	Bauble	g	La Gem	Seasoned Star	Canterbury Gold Cup (2000m)
2020	Campaldino	g	Zuzana	Shocking	Brisbane Cup
2017	Carpo Dell Impero	g	Gallant Babe	Gallant Guru	Cromwell Cup (2030m, 2x), Waikouiati Cup (2200m)
2019	Cluedo Lane	g	Treat Me	O'Reilly	White Robe Lodge WFA (1600m)
2016	El Gladiator	g	Querella	Haafiz (Ire)	Dunedin Guineas (1500m), Hororata Gold Cup (1800m), New Zealand Cup Trial (1800m)
2016	Live Drama	m	Sheeza Drama (Aus)	Pure Theatre (Aus)	Great Easter Stakes (1400m), South Island Thoroughbred Breeders Stakes (1600m)
2017	Noble Knight	g	Flight Arrival	Yamanin Vital	Dunedin Gold Cup (2400m), Invercargill Gold Cup (2600m), Marlborough Cup (2000m)
2018	Palmetto	g	Carolina Island	Darci Brahma	Dunedin Guineas, Southland Guineas, The Coast (Gosford, $500k), Five Diamonds Prelude (Randwick, $1M), Canberra Cup (listed 2000m)
2016	Smokin' Romans	g	Inferno	Yamanin Vital	Naturalism Stakes, Pakenham Cup, Queen Elizabeth Stakes (VRC), Turnbull Stakes, Warrnambool Cup

== See also ==
- Thoroughbred racing in New Zealand
