= More Joyous =

New Zealand-bred Thoroughbred racehorse

- Sire: More Than Ready
- Grandsire: Southern Halo
- Dam: Sunday Joy
- Damsire: Sunday Silence
- Sex: Mare
- Foaled: 2006
- Country: New Zealand
- Colour: Bay
- Owner: Strawberry Hills Stud (Mgr: J D Singleton)
- Trainer: Gai Waterhouse
- Jockey: Nash Rawiller
- Record: 30: 21–0–2
- Earnings: $4,490,450

Major wins
- Flight Stakes (2009); George Main Stakes (2010); Toorak Handicap (2010); Futurity Stakes (2011); Queen of the Turf Stakes (2011,2012); Doncaster Handicap (2012); Queen Elizabeth Stakes (2012)

Awards
- Australian Champion Middle Distance Racehorse (2012)
- Last updated on 2 March 2013

More Joyous (foaled 20 August 2006) is an Australian trained and New Zealand bred Thoroughbred racemare, trained by Gai Waterhouse.She has won eight Group 1 races.

== Pedigree ==
More Joyous is by the leading Southern Halo sire More Than Ready, and from the Australian Oaks winning Sunday Silence mare Sunday Joy.

== Racing career ==
More Joyous made her debut in January 2009 by winning a two-year-old fillies handicap by five and a half lengths. A month later she was sent out a $1.35 favourite in the Group 2 Silver Slipper Stakes at Rosehill. When the barriers opened the saddle on More Joyous slipped and she began buckjumping for about 100 metres and took no part in the race. Three weeks later she took out the Group 2 Reisling Stakes by 2.3 lengths from Melito before finishing second last in the Golden Slipper Stakes which was won by Phelan Ready. Following the race, Jockey Darren Beadman was suspended for five meetings for careless riding on More Joyous.

More Joyous began her spring campaign as a three-year-old by finishing third to Madam Pedrille in the 1100 metre listed Sheraco Stakes before winning the Group 2 Tea Rose Stakes and the Group 1 Flight Stakes. She was then spelled for four months and returned in the summer with a win in the Light Fingers Stakes, followed by a win in Surround Stakes.

Resuming as a spring four-year-old, More Joyous won the first four starts of her campaign, including Group One wins in the George Main Stakes and Toorak Handicap. She then stepped up in distance in the Cox Plate, where she started second favorite behind dominant favorite So You Think. She took on So You Think in the lead in the Cox Plate, before fading to fifth place behind him. Resuming again in the autumn, she again won her first four starts of her campaign, including the Futurity Stakes and Queen of the Turf Stakes at Group One level, before failing in the Doncaster Handicap on a heavy track.

== Racing record ==
2008–09 season as a two-year-old
Result	Date	Race	Venue	Group	Distance	Weight (kg)	Jockey	Winner/2nd
Won	17 Jan 2009	2yo Hcp	Rosehill	NA	1100 m	55.5	Nash Rawiller	2nd - Big Birdie
FF	28 Feb 2009	Silver Slipper Stakes	Rosehill	G2	1100 m	54.5	Nash Rawiller	1st - Melito
Won	21 Mar 2009	Reisling Stakes	Rosehill	G2	1200 m	55.5	Darren Beadman	2nd - Melito
15th	4 Apr 2009	Golden Slipper Stakes	Rosehill	G1	1200 m	54.5	Darren Beadman	1st - Phelan Ready

2009–10 season as a three-year-old
Result	Date	Race	Venue	Group	Distance	Weight (kg)	Jockey	Winner/2nd
3rd	29 Aug 2009	Sheraco Stakes	Rosehill	LR	1100 m	53	Blake Shinn	1st - Madam Pedrille
Won	19 Sept 2009	Tea Rose Stakes	Rosehill	G2	1500 m	56	Nash Rawiller	2nd - Melito
Won	3 Oct 2009	Flight Stakes	Randwick	G1	1600 m	56	Nash Rawiller	2nd - Sister Madly
Won	13 Feb 2010	Light Fingers Stakes	Randwick	G2	1200 m	56	Nash Rawiller	2nd - Trim
Won	6 Mar 2010	Surround Stakes	Warwick Farm	G2	1400 m	56	Nash Rawiller	2nd - Hurtle Myrtle

2010–11 season as a four-year-old
Result	Date	Race	Venue	Group	Distance	Weight (kg)	Jockey	Winner/2nd
Won	28 Aug 2010	Sheraco Stakes	Rosehill	LR	1100 m	59	Nash Rawiller	2nd - Girl Hussler
Won	11 Sep 2010	Sebring Sprint	Rosehill	G2	1400 m	54.5	Corey Brown	2nd - Rothesay
Won	25 Sep 2010	George Main Stakes	Randwick	G1	1600 m	54.5	Corey Brown	2nd - Trusting
Won	9 Oct 2010	Toorak Handicap	Caulfield	G1	1600 m	58	Nash Rawiller	2nd - We're Gonna Rock
5th	23 Oct 2010	Cox Plate	Moonee Valley	G1	2040 m	55.5	Nash Rawiller	1st - So You Think
Won	12 Feb 2011	Breeders' Classic	Randwick	G2	1200 m	57.5	Nash Rawiller	2nd - Graceful Anna
Won	26 Feb 2011	Futurity Stakes	Caulfield	G1	1400 m	57	Nash Rawiller	2nd - Whobegotyou
Won	19 Mar 2011	Canterbury Stakes	Rosehill	G2	1300 m	57	Nash Rawiller	2nd - Love Conquers All
Won	2 Apr 2011	Queen of the Turf Stakes	Rosehill	G1	1500 m	57	Nash Rawiller	2nd - Melito
11th	16 Apr 2011	Doncaster Handicap	Randwick	G1	1600 m	57	Nash Rawiller	1st - Sacred Choice

2011–12 season as a five-year-old
Result	Date	Race	Venue	Group	Distance	Weight (kg)	Jockey	Winner/2nd
3rd	30 Sep 2011	Manikato Stakes	Moonee Valley	G1	1200 m	56.5	Nash Rawiller	1st - Sepoy
Won	15 Oct 2011	Tristarc Stakes	Caulfield	G2	1400 m	58.57	Nash Rawiller	2nd - Sister Madly
7th	29 Oct 2011	Myer Classic	Flemington	G1	1600 m	57	Nash Rawiller	1st - Hurtle Myrtle
Won	24 Mar 2012	Canterbury Stakes	Rosehill	G2	1300 m	57	Nash Rawiller	2nd - Monton
Won	7 Apr 2012	Queen of the Turf Stakes	Rosehill	G1	1500 m	57	Nash Rawiller	2nd - Miss Keepsafe
Won	21 Apr 2012	Doncaster Handicap	Randwick	G1	1600 m	57.5	Nash Rawiller	2nd - Shootout
Won	28 Apr 2012	Queen Elizabeth Stakes	Randwick	G1	2000 m	57	Nash Rawiller	2nd - Manighar

2012–13 season as a six-year-old
Result	Date	Race	Venue	Group	Distance	Weight (kg)	Jockey	Winner/2nd
Won	15 Sep 2012	Sheraco Stakes	Rosehill	LR	1200 m	59	Nash Rawiller	2nd - Miss Marx
Won	29 Sep 2012	Golden Pendant	Rosehill	G3	1400 m	59	Nash Rawiller	2nd - Sykerush
4th	13 Oct 2012	Toorak Handicap	Caulfield	G1	1600 m	60	Nash Rawiller	1st - Solzhenitsyn
11th	27 Oct 2012	Cox Plate	Moonee Valley	G1	2040 m	57	Nash Rawiller	1st - Ocean Park
