= Biscay (horse) =

Australian-bred Thoroughbred racehorse

- Sire: Star Kingdom (IRE)
- Grandsire: Stardust
- Dam: Magic Symbol
- Damsire: Makarpura (GB)
- Sex: Stallion
- Foaled: 1965
- Country: Australia
- Colour: Chestnut
- Record: 8: 6-0-0
- Earnings: A$19,500

Major wins
- VATC Debutant Stakes (1967); Maribyrnong Plate (1967); VATC Merson Cooper Stakes (1968)
- Last updated on 10 August 2011

Biscay was an Australian Thoroughbred racehorse. As a two-year-old 1965 he won the Maribyrnong Plate by eight lengths.

== Background ==
A son of Star Kingdom from Magic Symbol by Makarpura (GB) he was a brother to Star of Heaven and Tattenham (9 wins and $26,845). Biscay was bred by Stanley Wootton at Barramul Stud in New South Wales.

Angus Armanasco, who was the leading trainer of two-year-olds in Melbourne for many years, declared Biscay was a star before the colt raced.

== Racing career ==
Biscay was undefeated as a three-year-old. An exceptionally speedy type, who usually jumped from the barrier clear of his rivals, Biscay had a short but successful racing career. From 8 starts he recorded 6 wins and was unplaced twice. His wins included the VRC Maribyrnong Plate, Merson Cooper Stakes and the VATC Debutant Stakes.

== Stud record ==
He was syndicated and in 1969 retired to stud to stand at the Bhima Stud, Scone, New South Wales. In 1972-73 Biscay was the leading first season sire. A quality sire in his own right he passed on his speed to his progeny which included the stakes winners:

- Belle Chanson (won SAJC Australasian Oaks)
- Biscadale (VATC One Thousand Guineas)
- Bletchingly (won AJC The Galaxy, sired the champion Kingston Town),
- Bounding Away, won 6 G1 races, including the STC Golden Slipper Stakes
- Lowan Star, won QTC Queensland Oaks and AJC Oaks
- Mahaasin (NZ ) won VATC Blue Diamond Stakes
- Marscay, winner of the 1982 Golden Slipper Stakes and a leading sire
- Scarlet Bisque (VATC Oakleigh Plate)
- Shaybisc (AJC Sires Produce Stakes)
- Zephyr Bay (VATC Oakleigh Plate).

Biscay was among the leading sires in Australia four times and Champion Juvenile Sire in 1981-82 and 1985-86. He has also proved to be a successful broodmare sire.

He died on 7 November 1987 having sired 300 individual winners (including 40 stakeswinners with 81 stakeswins) worth more than A$5.5 million in stakesmoney.

== Sire line tree ==
- Biscay
  - Bletchingly
    - Kingston Town
    - Best Western
    - Lord Ballina
      - Bureaucracy
      - Carsons Cash
      - Lord Tridan
      - Count Chivas
      - Lord Ted
      - Cent Home
      - Askim
      - Bocelli
      - Balmuse
    - True Version
    - Star Watch
    - Canny Lad
      - Accomplice
      - Dodge
      - Allez Suez
      - He's No Pie Eater
    - Coronation Day
    - Kennys Best Pal
  - Zephyr Bay
    - Zephyr Zip
    - Elounda Bay
    - Broad Reach
    - Full And By
  - Marscay
    - Jetball
    - March Hare
