= Challenge Stakes (ATC) =

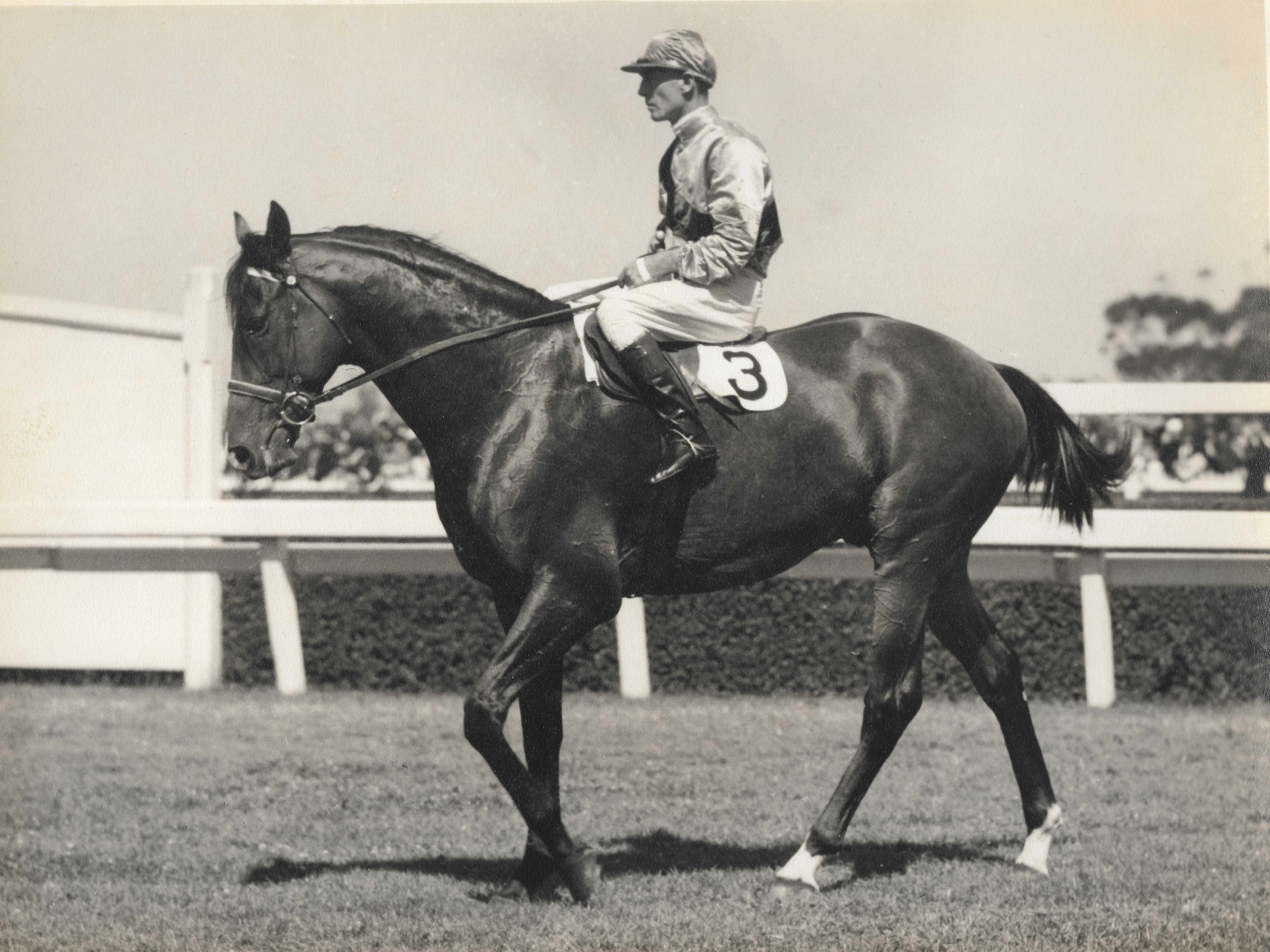
- High Caste, 1940 & 1942 winner
- Class: Group 2
- Location: Randwick Racecourse, Sydney, Australia
- Inaugurated: 1906
- Race type: Thoroughbred - flat
- Sponsor: Schweppes (2025 & 2026)

Race information
- Distance: 1,000 metres
- Surface: Turf
- Track: Right-handed
- Qualification: Horses three years old and older
- Weight: Weight for age
- Purse: A$500,000 (2026)
- Bonuses: Automatic qualification – The Galaxy and TJ Smith Stakes

The Challenge Stakes is an Australian Turf Club Group 2 Thoroughbred horse race at weight for age for horses three years old and older, over a distance of 1000 metres at Randwick Racecourse, Sydney in March.

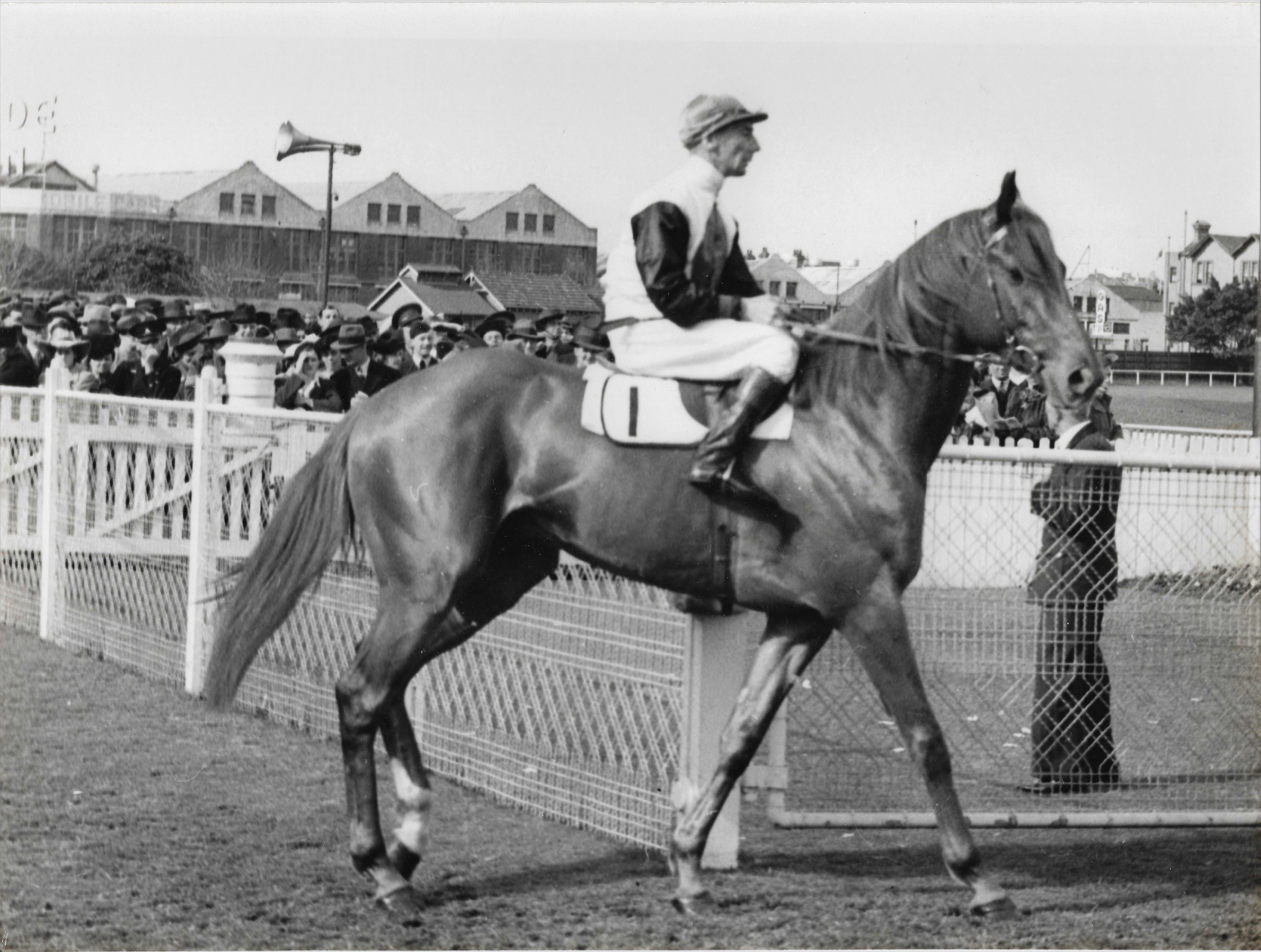
Yaralla, 1944 winner

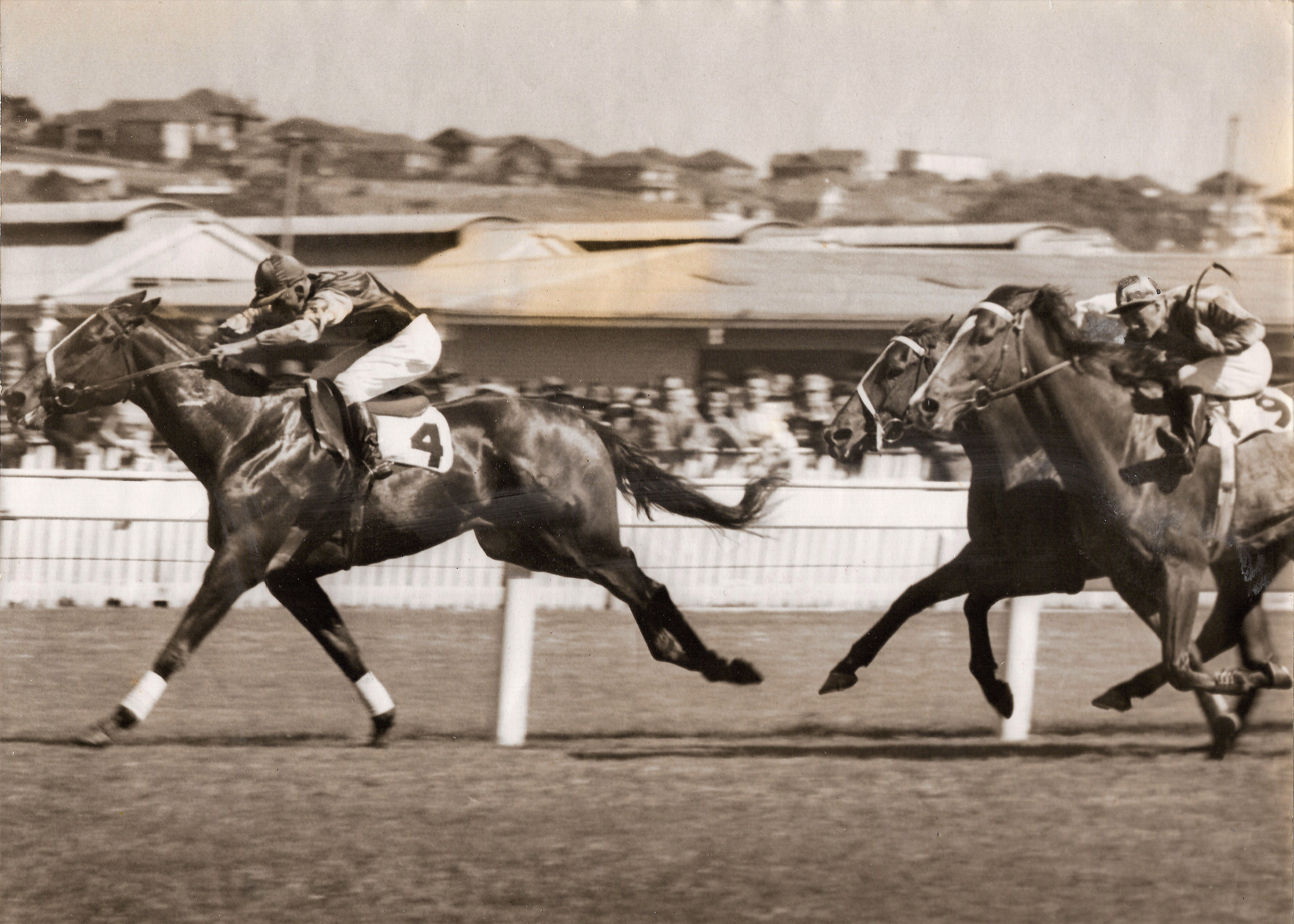
San Domenico, 1949 and 1950 winner

== History ==
The race was first run in 1906. Before 2003 the race was run in January or early February.

The track and race record was set by Redzel in the 2018 edition in a time of 55.73 seconds. In the 2021 race Eduardo lowered the track record to 55.20 seconds.

Recent multiple winners of the race include:

- Passive Aggressive winning in 2023 and 2024 trained by Grahame Begg and ridden by Jordan Childs.
- Eduardo winning in 2021 and 2022, trained by Joseph Pride and ridden by Nash Rawiller.
- Star Of Florida winning in 2003 and 2004, trained by Pat Duff and ridden by Patrick Payne.
- Joseph Pride has trained the winner in 2010, 2012, 2019, 2021 and 2022.
- Glyn Schofield rode the winner in 2010, 20111 and 2019.

In 1982 to 1984 Razor Sharp won the race three times, immediately followed by At Sea repeating the feat from 1985 to 1987.

=== Grade ===
- 1906–1978 - Principal Race
- 1987 onwards - Group 2

=== Venue ===
- 1906–2001 - Randwick
- 2002–2006 - Warwick Farm
- 2007–2010 - Randwick
- 2011 - Warwick Farm
- 2012 - Rosehill
- 2013 - Warwick Farm
- 2014 onwards - Randwick

=== Distance ===
- 1906–1972 - 5 furlongs (~1000 metres)
- 1973–2011 – 1000 metres
- 2012 – 1100 metres
- 2013 onwards – 1000 metres

== Winners ==
The following are past winners of the race.

- 2026 - Generosity
- 2025 - Jedibeel
- 2024 - Passive Aggressive
- 2023 - Passive Aggressive
- 2022 - Eduardo
- 2021 - Eduardo
- 2020 - Nature Strip
- 2019 - Ball Of Muscle
- 2018 - Redzel
- 2017 - English
- 2016 - English
- 2015 - Miracles Of Life
- 2014 - Villa Verde
- 2013 - Snitzerland
- 2012 - Rain Affair
- 2011 - Hay List
- 2010 - De Lightning Ridge
- 2009 - Olonana
- 2008 - Hurried Choice
- 2007 - Spark Of Life
- 2006 - Snitzel
- 2005 - Impaler
- 2004 - Star Of Florida
- 2003 - Star Of Florida
- 2002 - Bomber Bill
- 2001 - Pimpala Prince
- 2000 - Easy Rocking
- 1999 - Ab Initio
- 1998 - Cangronde
- 1997 - Cangronde
- 1996 - Light Up The World
- 1995 - Moss Rocket
- 1994 - Classic Magic
- 1993 - Spanish Mix
- 1992 - All Archie
- 1991 - Lightning Bend
- 1990 - Show County
- 1989 - Groucho
- 1988 - Snippets
- 1987 - At Sea
- 1986 - At Sea
- 1985 - At Sea
- 1984 - Razor Sharp
- 1983 - Razor Sharp
- 1982 - Razor Sharp
- 1981 - Steel Blade
- 1980 - Acamer
- 1979 - Christole
- 1978 - Monreale
- 1977 - Crimson Cloud
- 1976 - River Ridge
- 1975 - Zephyr Bay
- 1974 - War Island
- 1973 - Bounty
- 1972 - Playbill
- 1971 - Farlara
- 1970 - †Constant Rhythm / Biarritz Star
- 1969 - Gay Gauntlet
- 1968 - Dawn Boy
- 1967 - Gay Gauntlet
- 1966 - Tar Girl
- 1965 - Time And Tide
- 1964 - The Tempest
- 1963 - Wenona Girl
- 1962 - Rush Bye
- 1961 - Gili
- 1960 - Olympiad
- 1959 - Huntly
- 1958 - Dubbo
- 1957 - My Kingdom
- 1956 - Apple Bay
- 1955 - Gay Vista
- 1954 - Tarien
- 1953 - Apex
- 1952 - True Leader
- 1951 - Donegal
- 1950 - San Domenico
- 1949 - San Domenico
- 1948 - Gay Monarch
- 1947 - Brazier
- 1946 - Felbeam
- 1945 - Felbeam
- 1944 - Yaralla
- 1943 - Gold Salute
- 1942 - High Caste
- 1941 - Caesar
- 1940 - High Caste
- 1939 - Bradford
- 1938 - Hammer Head
- 1937 - Silver Rose
- 1936 - Heritor
- 1935 - The Marne
- 1934 - Air Queen
- 1933 - Captivation
- 1932 - Golden Gate
- 1931 - Casque D'Or
- 1930 - Venetian Lady
- 1929 - Whitta
- 1928 - Greenline
- 1927 - Don Moon
- 1926 - Quixotic
- 1925 - The Hawk
- 1924 - Laneffe
- 1923 - Duke Isinglass
- 1922 - Sir Maitland
- 1921 - Maltgilla
- 1920 - Aries
- 1919 - Sydney Damsel
- 1918 - Bonnie Plume
- 1917 - Wedding Day
- 1916 - Quinn's Post
- 1915 - Ninfia
- 1914 - Golden Hop
- 1913 - Golden Hop
- 1912 - Pride Of Murillo
- 1911 - Poi Dance
- 1910 - Fille Fogi
- 1909 - Neith
- 1908 - Lord Merv
- 1907 - Queen's Court
- 1906 - The Pet

† Dead heat

== See also ==
- List of Australian Group races
- Group races
