= Jim Tancred =

- Born: James Leo Tancred; 12 February 1903 Sydney
- Died: 1 May 1965 (aged 62)
- Notable relative(s): Arnold Tancred (brother); Harry Tancred (brother)

Rugby union career
- Position: prop
Amateur team(s)
Years	Team	Apps	(Points)
- Glebe-Balmain
International career
Years	Team	Apps	(Points)
1926–28	Wallabies	3	(0)

James Leo Tancred (12 February 1903 – 1 May 1965) was a rugby union player who represented Australia.

Tancred, a prop, was born in Sydney and claimed a total of 3 international rugby caps for Australia.
