= Harry Tancred =

NZ dual-code international rugby player

Personal information
- Full name: Henry Eugene Tancred
- Born: 25 May 1897 Balmain, NSW
- Died: 15 November 1961 (aged 64) Bellevue Hil, NSW

Playing information
- Height: 6 ft 2 in (1.88 m)
- Weight: 15 st 0 lb (95 kg)

Rugby union
- Position: number eight
Club
Years	Team	Pld	T	G	FG	P
1914	Petone Rugby Club
191?–19	Glebe-Balmain
	Total	0	0	0	0	0
Representative
Years	Team	Pld	T	G	FG	P
1923	Waratahs	2

Rugby league
- Position: Prop, lock, hooker
Club
Years	Team	Pld	T	G	FG	P
1919	Petone RLFC
1920	Western Suburbs	8	4	0	0	12
1921	City Rovers	3	2	0	0	6
	Total	11	6	0	0	18
Representative
Years	Team	Pld	T	G	FG	P
1919–21	New Zealand	13	4	0	0	12

Coaching information
Representative
Years	Team	Gms	W	D	L	W%
1921	Wellington
- Relatives: Arnold Tancred (brother); Jim Tancred (brother)

Henry Eugene "Harry" Tancred (25 May 1897 – 15 November 1961) was a rugby union and rugby league player and administrator who represented New Zealand at rugby league and Australia. He played 14 matches for New Zealand, 13 on tours of Australia in 1919 and 1921, and once in a pre-tour match against Auckland. He was an entrepreneurial businessman influential in meat wholesaling and exporting who together with his brothers, built Tancred Industries to become one of Australia's largest wholesale butchering firms. He was active in the thoroughbred industry as a racing administrator and racehorse owner.

Two of his brothers, Arnold and Jim, also played rugby union for Glebe-Balmain and Australia.

He married Myra Kathleen Bresnahan.

== Early life ==
Born in Balmain, New South Wales, Henry was the sixth of ten children born to Thomas Tancred, a butcher from California, United States of America, and his Victorian-born wife Anna, née O'Connor. He was educated by the Christian Brothers at St Joseph's School, Rozelle in Sydney before his father took the family to New Zealand pursuing opportunities in the meat trade. There while still a teenager Tancred worked as a drover and a slaughterman. Tancred returned to Sydney in the 1920s along with a number of his six brothers.

== Rugby career ==
Tancred, a number eight played with the Petone Rugby Club from 1914. Henry Tancred began his career playing in the Wellington region. In 1914 he played for the Petone rugby club against the Auckland club champions Ponsonby in a pre-season match won by Ponsonby 14-11.

In 1915 he played for the Wellington rugby team against Auckland at Eden Park. Wellington won the match 9-5 in front of 5,000 spectators.

Tancred continued to play for Petone and Wellington through to the 1918 season. In a 1918 article in the Free Lance, a Wellington based newspaper Tancred was described as a "big and burly youth… he is a fine specimen of a New Zealand lad, and takes a lot of stopping when he gets possession of the ball". This was to be his last season of rugby union.

Upon his return to Sydney in 1923 he was active as a player at the Glebe-Balmain club. He made representative appearances for the New South Wales state side. In 1923 the New Zealand Māori rugby union team visited and Tancred appeared in two games of the three match series in which the Waratahs were undefeated. With no Queensland Rugby Union administration or competition in place from 1919 to 1929, the New South Wales Waratahs were the top Australian representative rugby union side of the period and a number of their 1920s fixtures, including Tancred's two appearances in Sydney in June 1923, were decreed in 1986 as official Test matches. Tancred thus claimed a total of two international rugby caps for Australia. His brothers Arnold and Jim were also Australian national rugby representatives both making the 1927–28 Waratahs tour of the British Isles, France and Canada. Harry would later be involved in the administration of both the Randwick and Drummoyne Rugby Clubs.

== Rugby League career ==
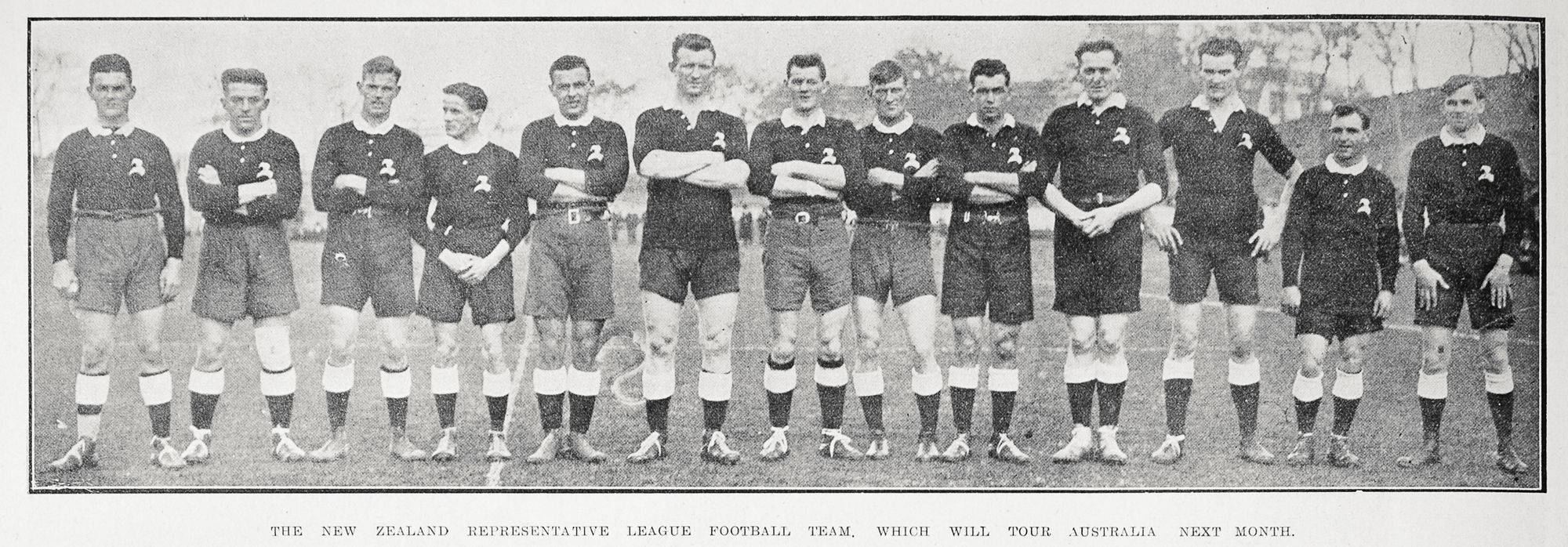
Tancred 6th from the left in the 'New Zealand' team to play Auckland on May 21, 1921.

In 1919 he switched codes moving from the Petone rugby team to the Petone league team. That same season he was picked for the New Zealand team to tour Australia and became Kiwi number 120 in the process.

Tancred had a busy tour playing in 8 of the 11 matches. He debuted for New Zealand in the first tour match against NSW Firsts where he played in the second row in an 18-23 loss in front of 46,157 spectators at the Sydney Cricket Ground. He played against the same opponents days later with New Zealand going down again 9-20. Tancred would have become very familiar with these opponents as he missed the matches with Tamworth and Northern Division but was back in action for two more matches with New South Wales Firsts which New Zealand again lost 31-39 and 19-22. Tancred tasted defeat for the 5th time on tour when New Zealand went down 13-26 to Queensland Firsts. A week later he moved to the lock position in another defeat to Queensland Firsts 13-16. Tancred experienced his first win in the New Zealand jersey in the 23-0 win over Rockhampton. This time he had been moved into the front row where he played prop and he also crossed the line for a try. He played there again against Toowoomba where New Zealand rounded the tour off with a resounding 42-12 win, scoring two more tries in the process.

In 1920 he moved to the Western Suburbs club in Sydney no doubt after having caught their eye while on the 1919 tour. He played 8 matches for them from Round 8 to Round 15 and scored 4 tries.

In 1921 he registered with the City Rovers club in the Auckland Rugby League competition. He scored two tries for them during the season which saw City win both the first grade championship and also the Roope Rooster.

In 1921 Tancred was to tour Australia again. In a match prior to the tour he played for New Zealand against Auckland in front of 11,000 spectators at the Auckland Domain. New Zealand won by 22 points to 16 with Tancred scoring a try after a "smart dash". He was named captain for the tour and he did this on field in at least 5 of the 8 matches. He played all his matches in the hooker position. His debut leading the side did not go well with New Zealand hammered 9-56 by a strong New South Wales Firsts side. He captained New Zealand again in a 25-12 win over Queensland Firsts, before losses to the same opponents 16-21, and 3-8. It is unknown if he took part in the matches with Wide Bay and Stanthorpe as there are no team lists for the matches. However he again captained New Zealand in the final tour match against Newcastle Firsts which New Zealand won 27-14.

After the tour was over Tancred coached the Wellington team prior to their match with Auckland.

In 1922 he gave the game away in New Zealand and was reportedly going into business in Sydney.

== Businessman ==
Tancred's great-grandfather was a butcher. His grandfather Peter established himself as a wholesale butcher in Kent Street, Sydney in 1844 before travelling to the US to further his prospects. Peter's son Thomas, Henry's father, branched out in 1869 and started a wholesale and retail meat business on Glebe Island in Sydney before taking the family to New Zealand. In the 1920s Henry and his six brothers returned to Sydney. Under Henry's leadership, they established the Tancred Brothers meat business which by 1956 was the listed company, Tancred Bros Industries Limited, one of Australia's largest wholesale butchering firms. Henry was founding chairman and managing director of the business from 1932 till 1959 and from 1946–61 was a member of the Meat Board, the national producer-owned company that regulated and promoted the meat industry in Australia.

== Racing interests ==
He was elected to the Committee of the Sydney Turf Club in 1941, appointed vice-chairman in 1945, served as chairman from 1953 to 1959, and retired from the committee in 1961. He owned the champion New Zealand bred stallion High Caste. In 2007 Tancred was inducted into the Sydney Turf Club Hall of Fame as an associate.
