= Expressway Stakes =

- Class: Group 2
- Location: Rosehill Gardens Racecourse; Sydney, New South Wales, Australia
- Inaugurated: 1974
- Race type: Thoroughbred – Flat racing
- Sponsor: Asahi Superdry (2025-26)

Race information
- Distance: 1,200 metres
- Surface: Turf
- Track: Right-handed
- Qualification: Three year olds and older
- Weight: Set Weights plus Penalties
- Purse: $300,000 (2026)

The Expressway Stakes is an Australian Turf Club Group 2 Thoroughbred open horse race for three-year-olds and older, run under Weight for Age conditions over a distance of 1200 metres at Rosehill Racecourse, Sydney, Australia in late January or early February.

== History ==
=== Distance ===
- 1974–1979 – 1100 metres
- 1980–1997 – 1200 metres
- 1998 – 1100 metres
- 1999 – 1300 metres
- 2000–2003 – 1200 metres
- 2004 – 1180 metres
- 2005 onwards - 1200 metres

=== Grade ===
- 1974– 1978 - Principal race
- 1979 onwards - Group 2

=== Venue ===
- 1974–1982 - Randwick Racecourse
- 1983 - Warwick Farm Racecourse
- 1984 - Randwick Racecourse
- 1985–1986 - Warwick Farm Racecourse
- 1987 - Randwick Racecourse
- 1988–1991 - Warwick Farm Racecourse
- 1992–2001 - Randwick Racecourse
- 2002 - Warwick Farm Racecourse
- 2003–2005 - Randwick Racecourse
- 2006–2007 - Rosehill Racecourse
- 2008 - Canterbury Park Racecourse
- 2009–2012 - Rosehill Racecourse
- 2013 - Warwick Farm Racecourse
- 2014 - Randwick Racecourse
- 2015–2019 - Rosehill Racecourse
- 2020 - Randwick Racecourse
- 2021–2023 - Rosehill Racecourse
- 2024 onwards - Randwick Racecourse

== Winners ==
The following are the past winners of the race.

- 2026 - Joliestar
- 2025 - Magic Time
- 2024 - King Of Sparta
- 2023 - Mariamia
- 2022 - Overpass
- 2021 - Savatiano
- 2020 - Standout
- 2019 - Alizee
- 2018 - Trapeze Artist
- 2017 - Music Magnate
- 2016 - Our Boy Malachi
- 2015 - Weary
- 2014 - Appearance
- 2013 - Happy Galaxy
- 2012 - Rain Affair
- 2011 - Centennial Park
- 2010 - Rangirangdoo
- 2009 - Burdekin Blues
- 2008 - Paratroopers
- 2007 - Mentality
- 2006 - Court's In Session
- 2005 - Court's In Session
- 2004 - Sportsman
- 2003 - Lonhro
- 2002 - Ateates
- 2001 - Tie The Knot
- 2000 - Mr. Innocent
- 1999 - Kidman's Cove
- 1998 - Hockney
- 1997 - Cangronde
- 1996 - Saintly
- 1995 - Moss Rocket
- 1994 - Soho Square
- 1993 - Let's Hurry
- 1992 - Joanne
- 1991 - Potrero
- 1990 - race not held
- 1989 - Groucho
- 1988 - At Sea
- 1987 - Diamond Shower
- 1986 - Avon Angel
- 1985 - Royal Troubador
- 1984 - Sir Dapper
- 1983 - Sheraco
- 1982 - Trench Digger
- 1981 - Goreham
- 1980 - Kingston Town
- 1979 - Joy Love
- 1978 - Luskin Star
- 1977 - Red Ruffian
- 1976 - Avellino
- 1975 - Zephyr Bay
- 1974 - I'm Scarlet

== See also ==
- List of Australian Group races
- Group races
