= Reisling Stakes =

- Class: Group 2
- Location: Randwick Racecourse, Sydney, Australia
- Inaugurated: 1973
- Race type: Thoroughbred - flat
- Sponsor: Petaluma (2025 & 2026)

Race information
- Distance: 1,200 metres
- Surface: Turf
- Track: Right-handed
- Qualification: Two year old fillies
- Weight: Set weights 55 1/2 kg
- Purse: A$300,000 (2026)
- Bonuses: Automatic entry to Golden Slipper Stakes (if nominated)

The Reisling Stakes is an Australian Turf Club Group 2 Thoroughbred horse race, for two-year-old fillies, at set weights, over a distance of 1200 metres, held at Randwick Racecourse in Sydney, Australia in March.

== History ==
The race is named in honour of the 1965 Golden Slipper winner Reisling.

The winner of this race receives automatic entry to the ATC Golden Slipper Stakes and the race is considered an important prep test due to the same distance as the Golden Slipper Stakes.

Seven fillies have captured the Reisling – Golden Slipper double:
Hartshill (1974), Burst (1992), Merlene (1996), Belle Du Jour (2000), Polar Express (2003), Overreach (2013) and Estijaab (2018)

=== Name ===
- 1973–2001 - Reisling Slipper Trial
- 2002 - Seppelt Salinger Slipper Trial
- 2003–2004 - Reisling Slipper Trial
- 2005–2010 - Reisling Stakes
- 2011 - McGrath Foundation Stakes
- 2012 - Reisling Stakes
- 2013 - Moët and Chandon Stakes
- 2014 onwards - Reisling Stakes

=== Grade ===
- 1973–1978 - Principal Race
- 1979–1986 - Listed Race
- 1980–1985 - Group 3
- 1986 onwards - Group 2

=== Venue ===
- 1973–2007 - Rosehill Gardens Racecourse
- 2008 - Canterbury Park Racecourse
- 2009–2014 - Rosehill Gardens Racecourse
- 2015 onwards - Randwick Racecourse

== Winners ==
The following are past winners of the race.

- 2025 - Tempted
- 2024 - Erno's Cube
- 2023 - Learning To Fly
- 2022 - Seven Veils
- 2021 - Glistening
- 2020 - Dame Giselle
- 2019 - Tenley
- 2018 - Estijaab
- 2017 - Frolic
- 2016 - French Fern
- 2015 - English
- 2014 - Earthquake
- 2013 - Overreach
- 2012 - Samaready
- 2011 - Elite Falls
- 2010 - Military Rose
- 2009 - More Joyous
- 2008 - Hips Don't Lie
- 2007 - Press The Button
- 2006 - Pure Energy
- 2005 - Fashions Afield
- 2004 - Alinghi
- 2003 - Polar Success
- 2002 - Fatoon
- 2001 - Regal Kiss
- 2000 - Belle Du Jour
- 1999 - Let's Rock Again
- 1998 - Manana
- 1997 - Rose Of Danehill
- 1996 - Merlene
- 1995 - Ginzano
- 1994 - Moment's Pleasure
- 1993 - Star Of Nouvelle
- 1992 - Burst
- 1991 - Bold Promise
- 1990 - Triscay
- 1989 - Sunshine Sally
- 1988 - Startling Lass
- 1987 - Midnight Fever
- 1986 - Magic Flute
- 1985 - Beach Gown
- 1984 - Rass Dancer
- 1983 - Purpose
- 1982 - Vaindarra
- 1981 - Allez Show
- 1980 - Shaybisc
- 1979 - Lowan Star
- 1978 - Spanish Yacht
- 1977 - Mistress Anne
- 1976 - Bianca
- 1975 - Inner Magic
- 1974 - Hartshill
- 1973 - Favourite Girl

== See also ==
- List of Australian Group races
- Group races
