= Arnold Tancred =

Australia international rugby union player

- Born: Arnold Joseph Tancred; 30 October 1904 Leichhardt, New South Wales
- Died: 22 September 1963 (aged 58) Drummoyne, New South Wales, Australia
- School: St. Patrick's College, Wellington
- Notable relative(s): Harry Tancred (brother); Jim Tancred (brother)
- Occupation: meat industry

Rugby union career
- Position: flanker
Amateur team(s)
Years	Team	Apps	(Points)
- Glebe-Balmain
International career
Years	Team	Apps	(Points)
1927	Waratahs	3	(0)

Arnold Joseph Tancred (30 October 1904 – 22 September 1963) was an Australian rugby union player, a state and national representative flanker. He was prominent in the meat industry in Australia with significant family business interests in meat wholesaling. He owned and raced horses and served a term as President of the New South Wales Rugby Union.

== Early life ==
Tancred was born in the Sydney suburb of Leichhardt, the youngest of ten children born to Thomas Tancred, a butcher from California, and his Victorian-born wife Anna, née O'Connor. After his father took the family to New Zealand, pursuing opportunities in the meat trade, Tancred was educated at St. Patrick's College, Wellington. He returned to Sydney in the 1920s, along with some of his six brothers.

== Playing career ==
Tancred's Sydney club career was with the Glebe-Balmain club in the 1920s. He claimed a total of three international rugby caps for Australia on the 1927–28 Waratahs tour of the British Isles, France and Canada. With no Queensland Rugby Union administration or competition in place from 1919 to 1929, the New South Wales Waratahs were the top Australian representative rugby union side of the period and a number of their fixtures of 1920s played against full international opposition were decreed by the Australian Rugby Union in 1986 as official Test matches. His appearances in the internationals against Ireland, Wales and Scotland in 1927 thus now have Test match status.

== Rugby manager ==
Tancred was the tour manager and unofficial coach of the Wallabies on the 1947–48 Australia rugby union tour of Britain, Ireland, France and North America. Journalist Phil Tressider, who accompanied the touring party, wrote: "I remember Tancred as a grim, brooding man who not only managed the team but coached it and was sole selector. He would brook no interference and he kept the press at arm's length. He was fortified by his experiences as a player with the 1927-28 Waratahs and he had an aching ambition for victory." Sir Nicholas Shehadie was in the playing squad and wrote of Tancred: "[He] was a very strict disciplinarian who was determined that we would win as many matches as possible. He would constantly remind us that we would only be remembered for the number of matches we won."

== Businessman ==
Tancred's paternal grandfather, Peter Tancred, established himself as a wholesale butcher in Kent Street, Sydney, in 1844 before travelling to the US to further his prospects. Thomas Tancred, Arnold's father, branched out in 1869, starting a wholesale and retail meat business on Glebe Island in Sydney before taking the family to New Zealand.

In the 1920s Arnold and some of his older brothers returned to Sydney. Under the leadership of Henry Eugene Tancred (1897-1961), they established the Tancred Bros meat business which by 1956 was the listed company Tancred Bros Industries Ltd, one of Australia's largest wholesale butchering firms. Arnold succeeded his elder brother Henry as chairman and managing director of the business in 1959, and from 1961 to 1963 was a member of the Meat Board, the national producer-owned company that regulated and promoted the meat industry in Australia. Arnold Tancred was a pioneer in the export of Australian beef to the US, where his father had been born. His single term as president of the New South Wales Rugby Union was in 1959. He was active in the thoroughbred industry, owning and racing horses.
