= Luskin Star =

Australian-bred Thoroughbred racehorse

- Sire: Kaoru Star
- Grandsire: Star Kingdom
- Dam: Promising
- Damsire: Idomeneo
- Sex: Stallion
- Foaled: 1974
- Country: Australia
- Colour: Bay or Brown
- Breeder: O’Neills at Luskintyre Stud
- Owner: Mr & Mrs J Balcomb, D Ninnes and BE Barnett
- Trainer: Max Lees; Bart Cummings
- Record: 17: 13- 3-0
- Earnings: A$280,900

Major wins
- Breeders' Plate (1976); Silver Slipper Stakes (1976); Todman Stakes (1977); Golden Slipper Stakes (1977); AJC Sires Produce Stakes (1977); AJC Champagne Stakes (1977); QTC Sires Produce Stakes (1977); Marlboro Stakes (1977); Cameron Handicap (1977); Caulfield Guineas (1977); Expressway Stakes (1978); Phar Lap Stakes (1978); The Galaxy (1978)

Honours
- Australian Racing Hall of Fame

Luskin Star (1974-2002) was a Thoroughbred racehorse and winner of the Australian two-year-old Triple Crown of Thoroughbred Racing.

== Breeding ==
The colt by Kaoru Star out of Promising (NZ) was consigned to the 1976 Sydney Easter Yearling Sales as Lot 734, but was passed in for $6,500 with a reserve of $8,000. He was later purchased by Newcastle trainer Max Lees for stable clients Mr and Mrs John Balcomb, Don Ninnes and Barry Barnett. His sire Kaoru Star was a son of Star Kingdom and grandson of Hyperion. Promising, the dam of Luskin Star, was bred in New Zealand and imported to Australia where she won two minor races at Newcastle and Wyong. Her sire Idomeneo is by the well-bred stallion Alycidon.

== Racing career ==
=== At two years ===
Luskin Star showed an effortless galloping style and great speed from his first training sessions at Newcastle's Broadmeadow track. In his debut he won the 2nd division of the Breeders' Plate over 1000 metres at Randwick, by 12 lengths, in the very good time of 58.8sec in soft ground. At his next appearance he won the 900-metre Silver Slipper Stakes at Rosehill, defeating Biscapol by 4 and 1/2 lengths, equalling the race record time of 52.6sec. He was then spelled until returned to training in February where he won a 900-metre barrier trial at Broadmeadow by 12 lengths. His return to racing was in the 1200 metre Northern Slipper Stakes at Newcastle. Heavy rain was falling prior to the race and trainer Max Lees requested permission from the stewards to scratch the horse. His request was refused. Luskin Star ran second to Mistress Anne by 3/4 of a length. In his next start, on a dry track at Rosehill on 12 March, he won the 1200 metre Todman Slipper Trial Stakes defeating Mondiso with Pacific Prince running third. In the Golden Slipper Stakes, Luskin Star shared favouritism with the TJ Smith trained Blazing Saddles. Coming from sixth on the home turn, Luskin Star won by 7 lengths from Lloyd Boy and Blazing Saddles, in race record time of 1min 10sec. His next start was in the 1400 metre AJC Sires' Produce Stakes where he went to the front from the start, and led on the home turn by 5 lengths, before defeating Bold Zest by 3 lengths with a further 5 lengths to Bensynd in third. The winning time was a new course and Australian record of 1 min 21.5 sec. A week later he completed the Triple Crown for two-year-olds with an easy 6 length win of the 1600 metre Champagne Stakes by defeating Marceau and Bold Zest. While most two-year-olds would now have gone for a spell, Luskin Star was sent to the Brisbane Carnival in May. Here he won the QTC Sires Produce Stakes as a 10–1 on favourite and nine days later the Marlboro Stakes, surviving a protest by G. Cook, the rider of Gypsy Kingdom.

== Legacy ==
John Balcomb commissioned Newcastle musicians Phil Mahoney and Princess Chic Murangi to write a song in Luskin Star's honour. Johnny Tapp recorded the song on M7 Records in 1977.

== See also ==
- List of Australian Group races
- Group races
