= Silver Slipper Stakes =

- Class: Group 2
- Location: Rosehill Gardens Racecourse
- Inaugurated: 1963
- Race type: Thoroughbred - flat
- Sponsor: Chandon (2026)

Race information
- Distance: 1,100 metres
- Surface: Turf
- Track: Right-handed
- Qualification: Two year old
- Weight: Set weights colts and geldings – 56 1/2 kg fillies – 54 1/2 kg
- Purse: A$300,000 (2026)
- Bonuses: Winner exempt from ballot for Golden Slipper Stakes

The Silver Slipper Stakes is an Australian Turf Club Group 2 Thoroughbred horse race for horses aged two years old, over a distance of 1100 metres. It is held annually at Rosehill Racecourse in Sydney, Australia. The race is regarded as a traditional lead up race for the Golden Slipper Stakes.

== History ==
The following thoroughbreds captured the Silver Slipper – Golden Slipper double:
Eskimo Prince (1964), Baguette (1970), Luskin Star (1977), Pierro (2012), Mossfun (2014), She Will Reign (2017), Farnan (2020)

=== Distance ===
- 1963–1969 - 4 furlongs (~800 metres)
- 1970 held - 5 furlongs (~1000 metres)
- 1971–1972 - 4 furlongs (~800 metres)
- 1973–1983 - 900 metres
- 1984 onwards held over 1100 metres.

=== Grade ===
- 1963–1978 - Principal Race
- 1979 onwards - Group 2

=== Venue ===
- 1991 - Canterbury Park Racecourse

== Winners ==
The following are past winenrs of the race.

- 2026 - Stretan Ruler
- 2025 - Beiwacht
- 2024 - Straight Charge
- 2023 - Cylinder
- 2022 - Best Of Bordeaux
- 2021 - Home Affairs
- 2020 - Farnan
- 2019 - Time To Reign
- 2018 - Sunlight
- 2017 - She Will Reign
- 2016 - Astern
- 2015 - Headwater
- 2014 - Mossfun
- 2013 - Sweet Idea
- 2012 - Pierro
- 2011 - Satin Shoes
- 2010 - Chance Bye
- 2009 - Melito
- 2008 - Amelia’s Dream
- 2007 - Shaft
- 2006 - Plagiarize
- 2005 - Domesday
- 2004 - Ballybleue
- 2003 - Hasna
- 2002 - Victory Vein
- 2001 - Excellerator
- 2000 - French Braids
- 1999 - Passmore
- 1998 - Iglesia
- 1997 - †race not held
- 1996 - Millward
- 1995 - Clang
- 1994 - Strategic
- 1993 - Dapper Magic
- 1992 - Gold Brose
- 1991 - Kenfair
- 1990 - Honey Be Quick
- 1989 - Triscay
- 1988 - Show County
- 1987 - Ballook
- 1986 - Maizcay
- 1985 - Pre Catelan
- 1984 - Kisses For Kathy
- 1983 - Giostra
- 1982 - Been There
- 1981 - Vaindarra
- 1980 - Black Shoes
- 1979 - Fiancee
- 1978 - Mersing
- 1977 - Inventive
- 1976 - Luskin Star
- 1975 - Rainbeam
- 1974 - St. Louis Belle
- 1973 - Royal Britannia
- 1972 - Jewel Thief
- 1971 - Sovereign Slipper
- 1970 - Regal Gauntlet
- 1969 - Baguette
- 1968 - Gaelic Spirit
- 1967 - Topmost
- 1966 - Tod Maid
- 1965 - Very Merry
- 1964 - Peace Council
- 1963 - Eskimo Prince

† Not raced in calendar year due to change of schedule as race moved from spring to late summer

== See also ==
- List of Australian Group races
- Group races
