= Todman Stakes =

- Class: Group 2
- Location: Randwick Racecourse, Sydney, Australia
- Inaugurated: 1973
- Race type: Thoroughbred - flat
- Sponsor: Darley (2025 & 2026)

Race information
- Distance: 1,200 metres
- Surface: Turf
- Track: Right-handed
- Qualification: Two year olds colts and geldings
- Weight: Set weights 55 1/2 kg
- Purse: A$300,000 (2026)
- Bonuses: Automatic entry to Golden Slipper Stakes (if nominated)

The Todman Stakes is an Australian Turf Club Group 2 Thoroughbred horse race, for two-year-old colts and geldings, at set weights, over a distance of 1200 metres held at Randwick Racecourse in Sydney, Australia in March.

== History ==
The winner of this race receives automatic entry to the ATC Golden Slipper Stakes and the race is considered an important prep test due to the same distance as the Golden Slipper Stakes.

The following thoroughbreds have captured the Todman – Golden Slipper double:

- Luskin Star (1977)
- Marauding (1987)
- Tierce (1991)
- Pierro (2012)
- Vancouver (2015)
- Farnan (2020).

Recent multiple winners include:

Jockeys

- Hugh Bowman in 2023, 2007, 2008 and 2020.

Trainers

- Gai Waterhouse in 2001, 2002, 2006, 2007, 2012, 2015 and 2016 and in partnership with Adrian Bolt in 2020.

=== Name ===
The race is named after champion Todman winner of first Golden Slipper Stakes in 1957 by 8 lengths and starting at the short odds of 1/6on.

- 1973–2004 - Todman Slipper Trial
- 2005 onwards - Todman Stakes

=== Venue ===
- 1973–2007 - Rosehill Gardens Racecourse
- 2008 - Canterbury Park Racecourse
- 2009–2014 - Rosehill Gardens Racecourse
- 2015 - Randwick Racecourse

=== Grade ===
- 1973–1978 - Principal Race
- 1979–1986 - Listed Race
- 1980–1985 - Group 3
- 1986 onwards - Group 2

== Winners ==
The following are past winners of the race.

- 2026 - Paradoxium
- 2025 - Tentyris
- 2024 - Switzerland
- 2023 - Cylinder
- 2022 - Sejardan
- 2021 - Anamoe
- 2020 - Farnan
- 2019 - Yes Yes Yes
- 2018 - Aylmerton
- 2017 - Gunnison
- 2016 - Kiss And Make Up
- 2015 - Vancouver
- 2014 - Ghibellines
- 2013 - Criterion
- 2012 - Pierro
- 2011 - Smart Missile
- 2010 - Masquerader
- 2009 - Real Saga
- 2008 - Krupt
- 2007 - Meurice
- 2006 - Diego Garcia
- 2005 - Written Tycoon
- 2004 - Charge Forward
- 2003 - Exceed And Excel
- 2002 - Snowland
- 2001 - Royal Courtship
- 2000 - Great Crusader
- 1999 - Align
- 1998 - Laurie's Lottery
- 1997 - General Nediym
- 1996 - Flavour
- 1995 - Octagonal
- 1994 - Pauillac
- 1993 - Justice Prevails
- 1992 - Clan O'Sullivan
- 1991 - Tierce
- 1990 - Auranch
- 1989 - Mercury
- 1988 - Full And By
- 1987 - Marauding
- 1986 - Haida Prince
- 1985 - Asarka
- 1984 - County
- 1983 - Daybreak Lover
- 1982 - Mr McGinty
- 1981 - Crown Jester
- 1980 - Nassau
- 1979 - Dignitas' Son
- 1978 - Black Opaque
- 1977 - Luskin Star
- 1976 - †Blue And Gold / Pacific Ruler
- 1975 - †Top Charer / Rosie Heir
- 1974 - Scamanda
- 1973 - Imagele

† Run in Divisions

== See also ==
- List of Australian Group races
- Group races
