= Canterbury Stakes =

Annual horse race in Australia

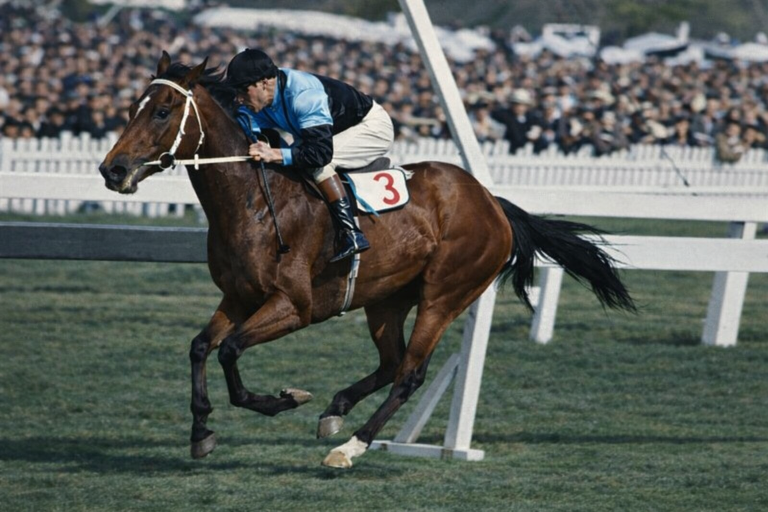
- Shannon,1947 winner
- Class: Group 1
- Location: Randwick Racecourse, Sydney, Australia
- Inaugurated: 1929
- Race type: Thoroughbred
- Sponsor: Coolmore (2026)

Race information
- Distance: 1,300 metres
- Surface: Turf
- Qualification: Three year old and over
- Weight: Weight for age
- Purse: $750,000 (2026)
- Bonuses: Automatic qualification – George Ryder Stakes and Doncaster Mile

The Canterbury Stakes is an Australian Turf Club Group 1 Thoroughbred horse race for horses aged three years old and upwards at weight for age, over a distance of 1300 metres, held annually at Randwick Racecourse in Sydney, Australia, in March.

== History ==
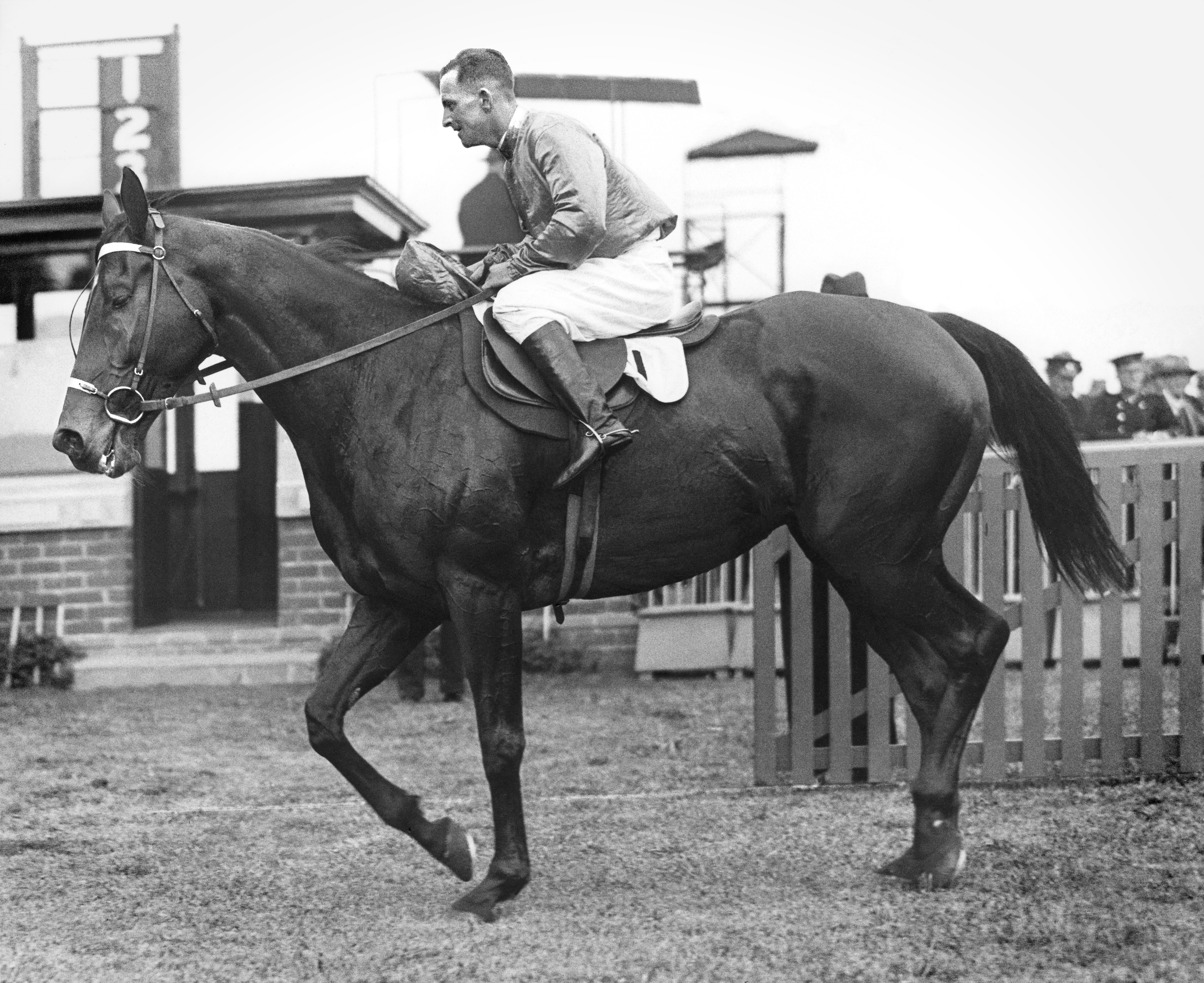
Amounis, 1929 winner

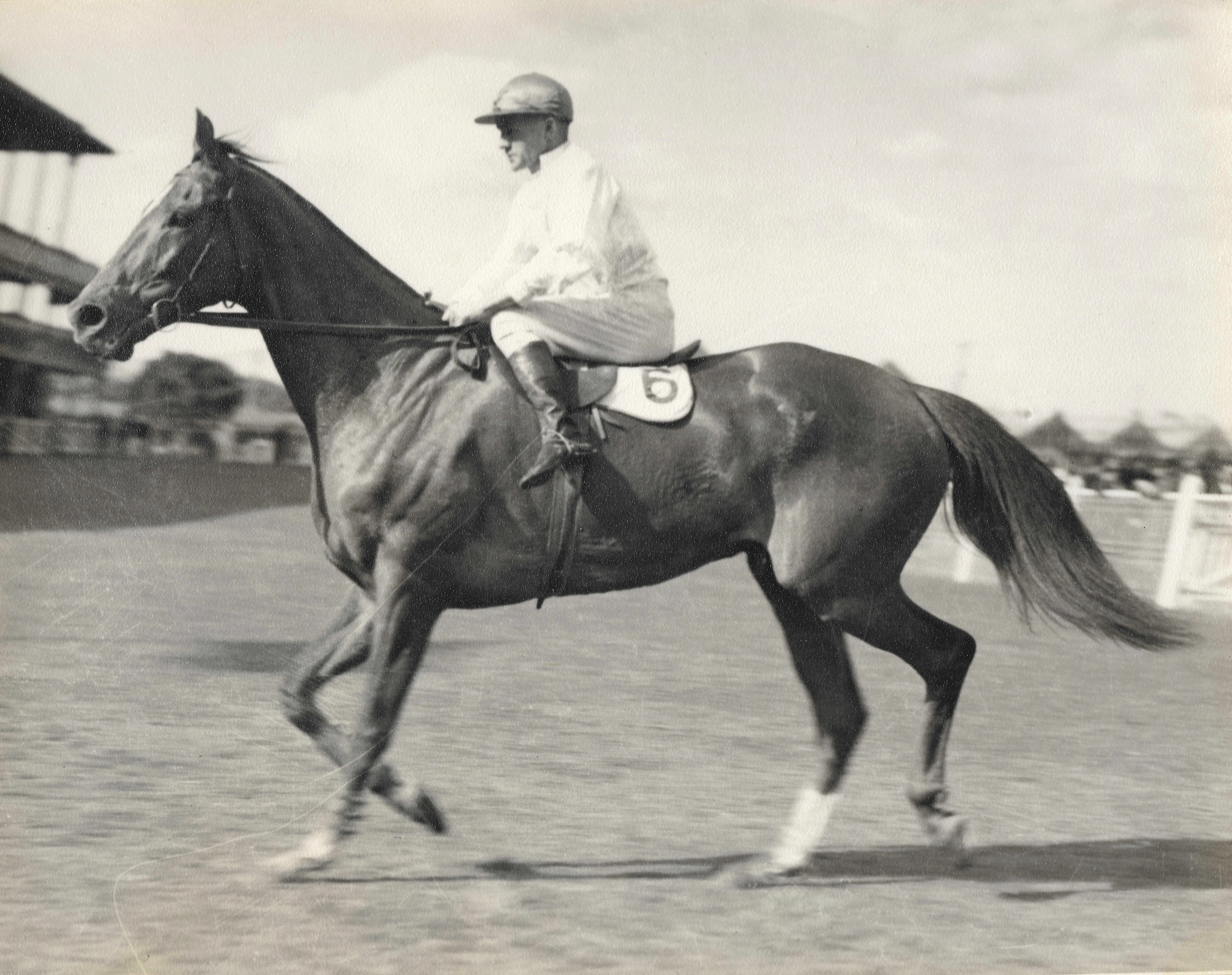
Lough Neagh – 1934 winner

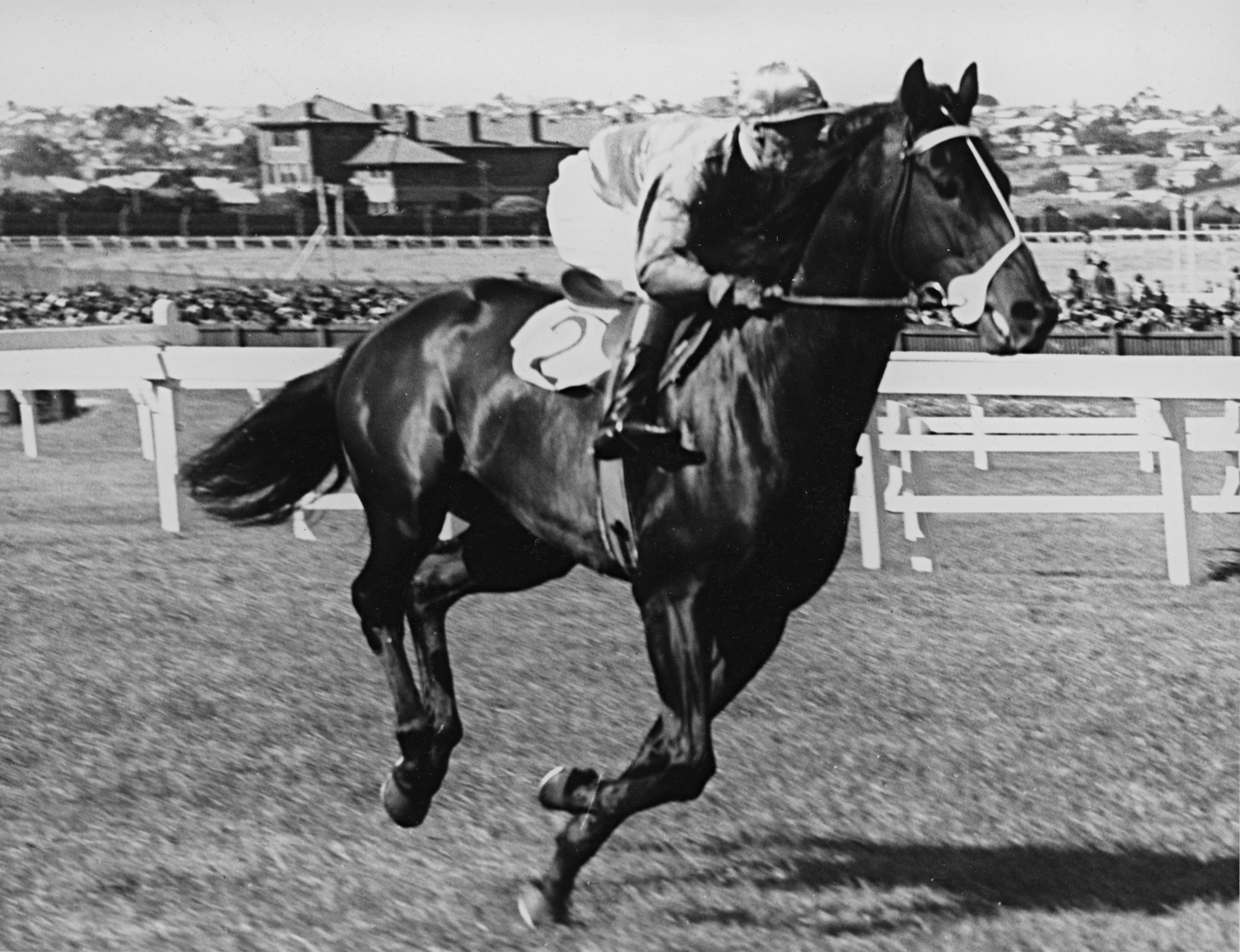
Beau Vite – 1939 winner

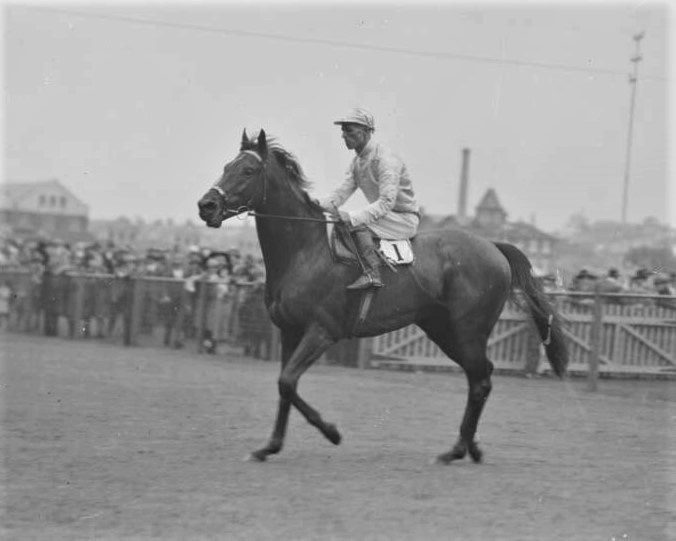
Chatham, 1933 winner

The race was always run at Canterbury Park Racecourse, but after the Australian Jockey Club and the Sydney Turf Club merged, the new club implemented major program changes and moved to Rosehill. Since 2014 the event has been held at Randwick Racecourse.

=== Distance ===
- 1929–1972 - 6 furlongs (~1200 metres)
- 1973–2003 - 1200 metres
- 2004–2007 - 1300 metres
- 2008 - 1550 metres
- 2008 onwards - 1300 metres

=== Grade ===
- 1929–1978 - Principal race
- 1979–2012 - Group 2 race
- 2013 onwards - Group 1

=== Venue ===
- 1929–1996 - Canterbury Park Racecourse
- 1997–1999 - Rosehill Gardens Racecourse
- 2000–2003 - Canterbury Park Racecourse
- 2004–2007 - Rosehill Gardens Racecourse
- 2008 - Canterbury Park Racecourse
- 2009–2013 - Rosehill Gardens Racecourse
- 2014 onwards - Randwick Racecourse

=== Recent multiple winners ===
Trainers

- Gai Waterhouse trained the race winner in 2005, 2011, 2012, 2013 and 2015 as well as 2025 in partnership with Adrian Bott.
- John Hawkes was the winning trainer in 2004, 2006, 2007 and 2008.

Jockeys

- Darren Beadman was the successful jockey in 2000, 2004, 2006, 2007 and 2008.
- Nash Rawiller rode the winners in 2011, 2012 and 2020.

=== 1932 racebook ===
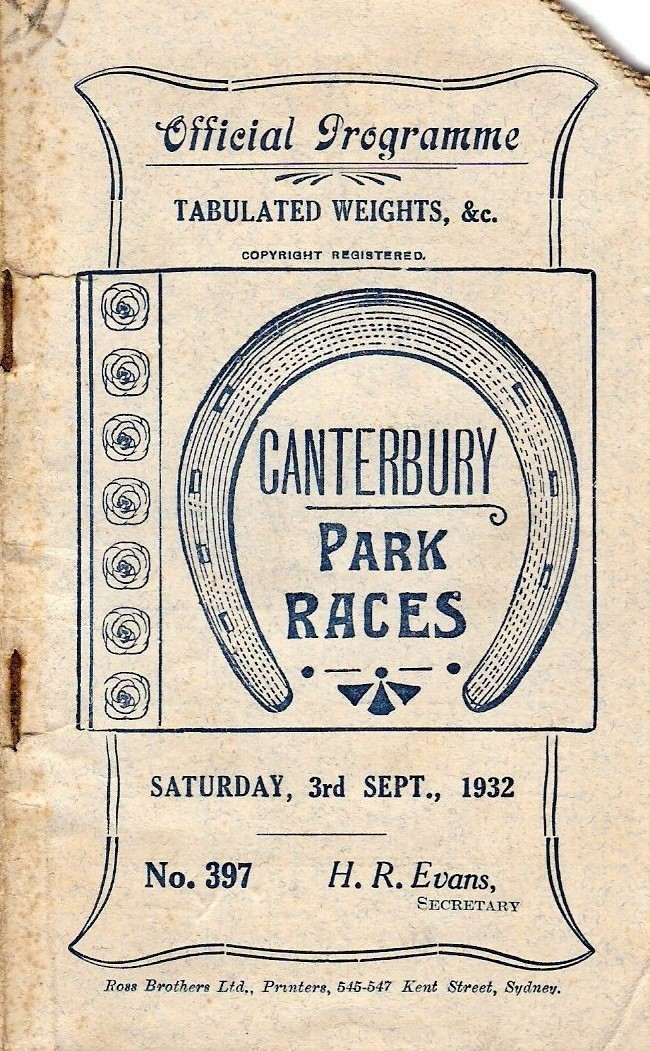
1932 STC Canterbury Stakes racebook front cover

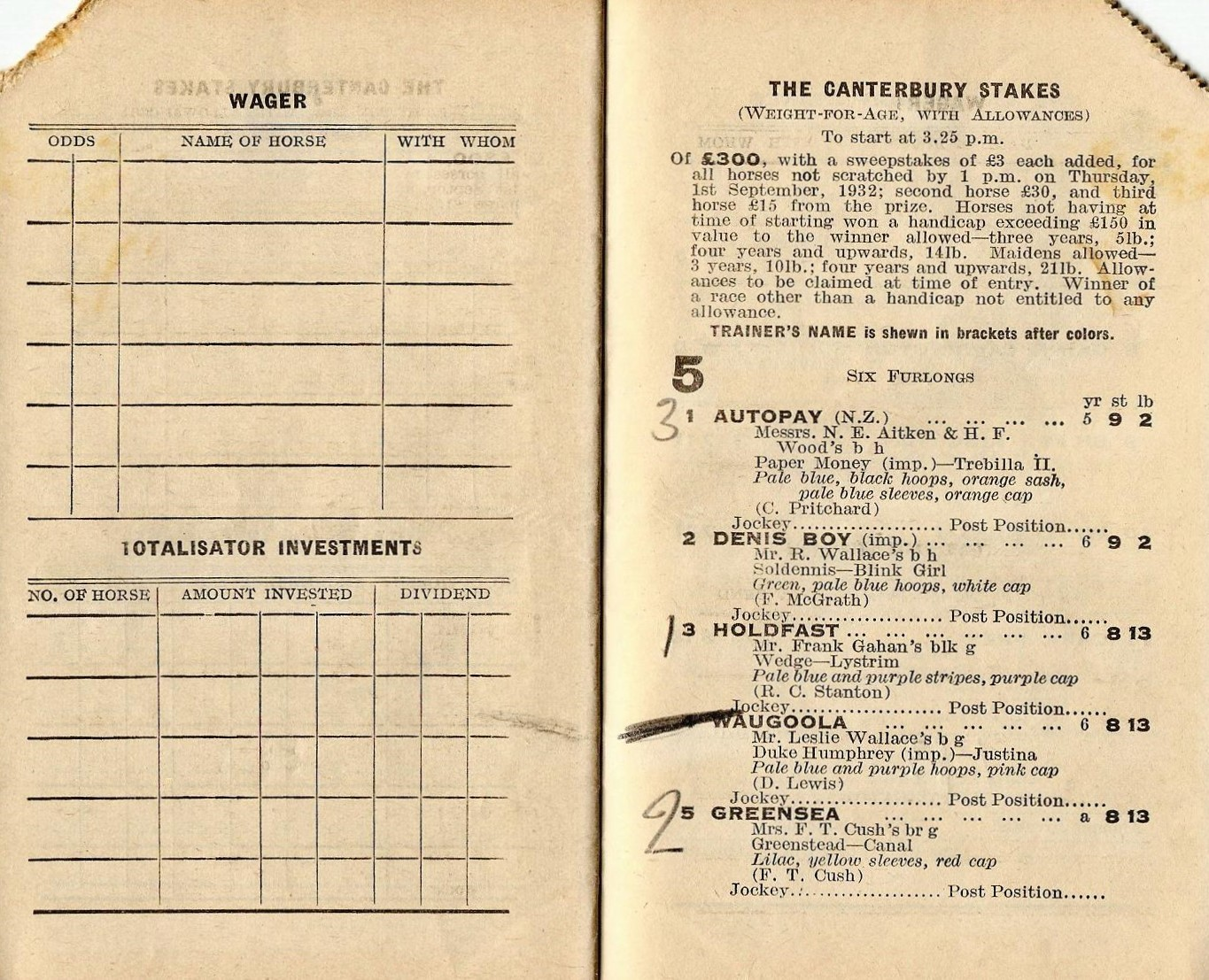
1932 STC Canterbury Stakes showing race conditions & winner - Holdfast (3rd time)

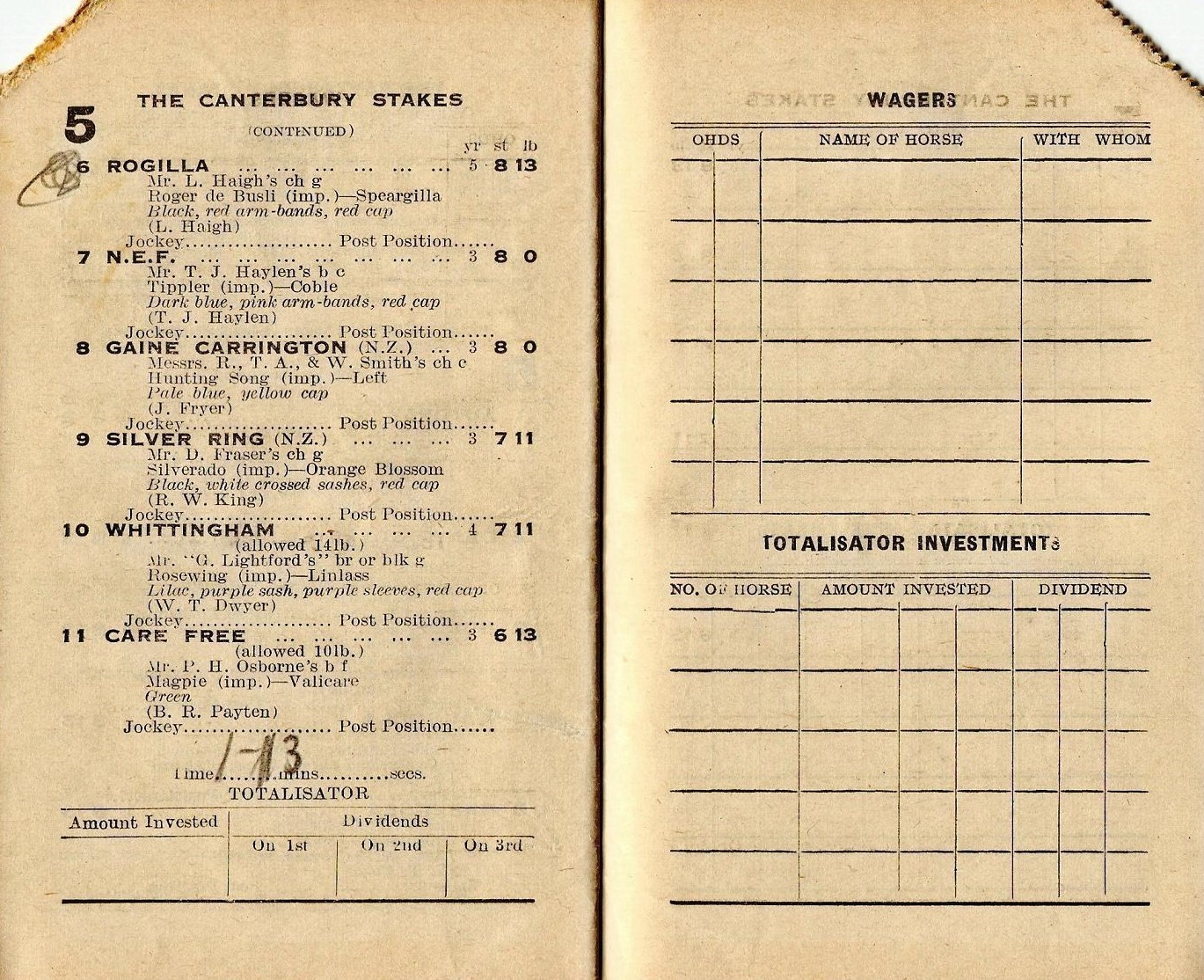
1932 STC Canterbury Stakes page starters and results

=== Gallery of noted winners ===
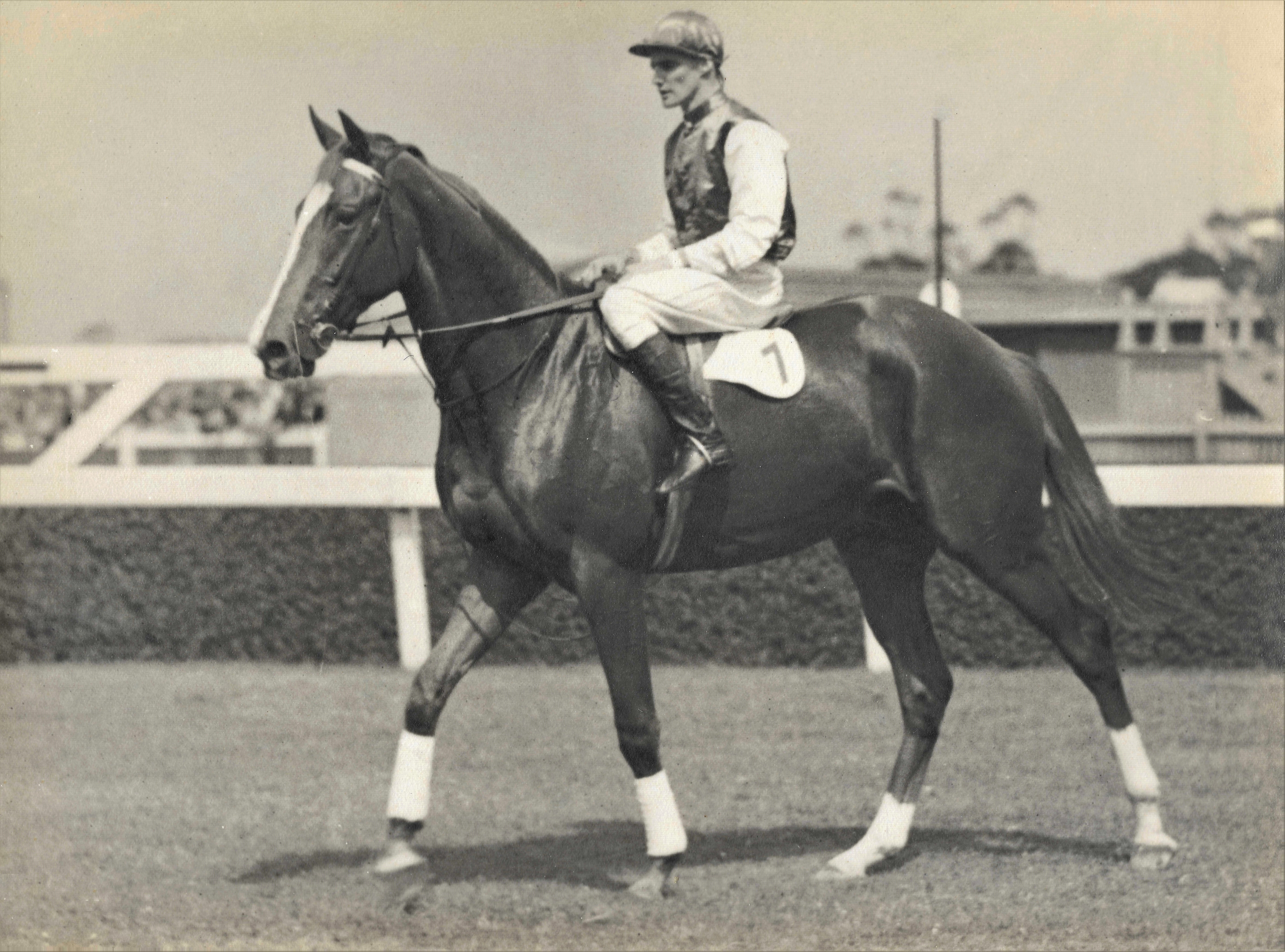
Gold Rod, 1938 winner

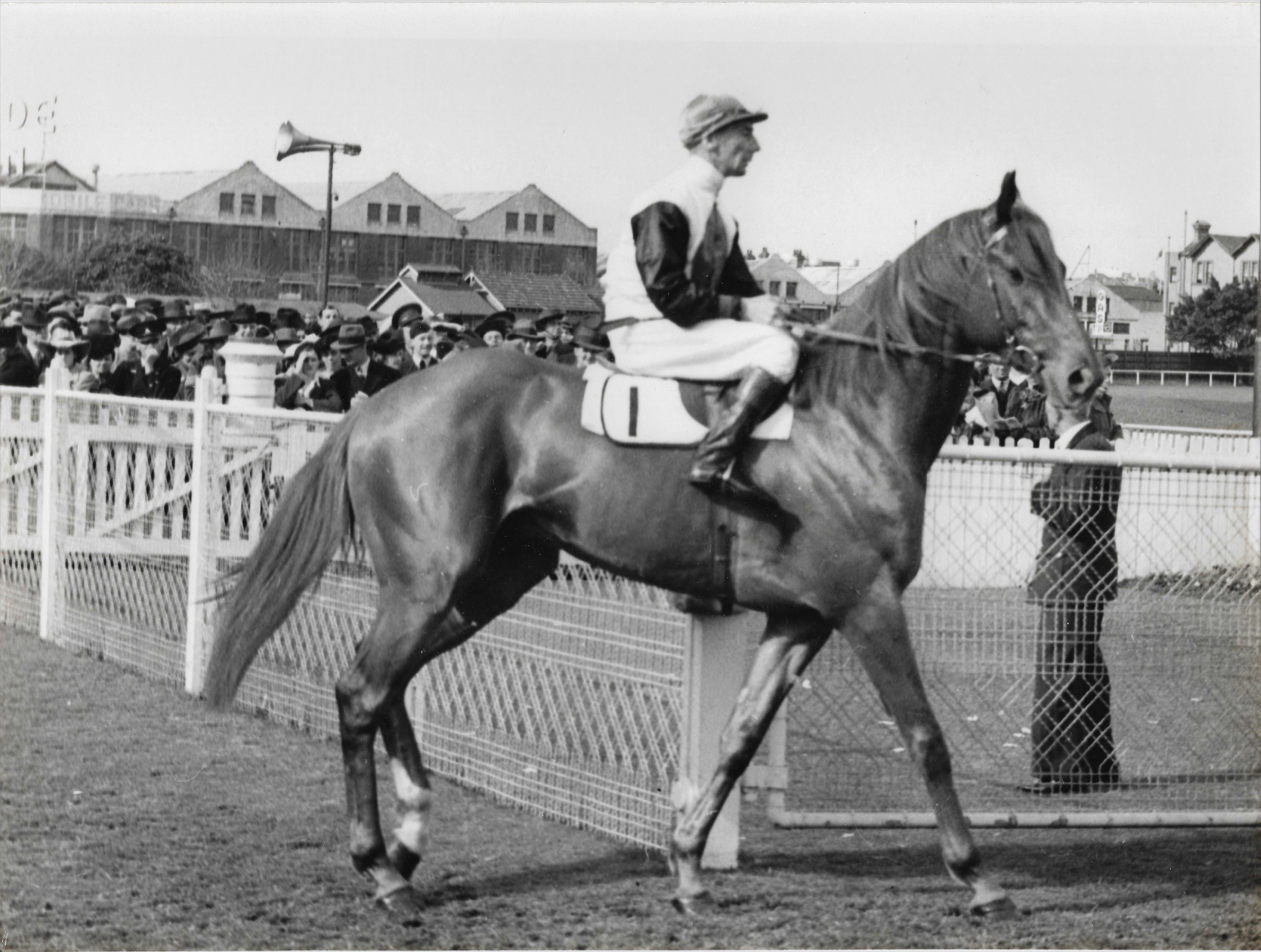
Yaralla, 1942 winner

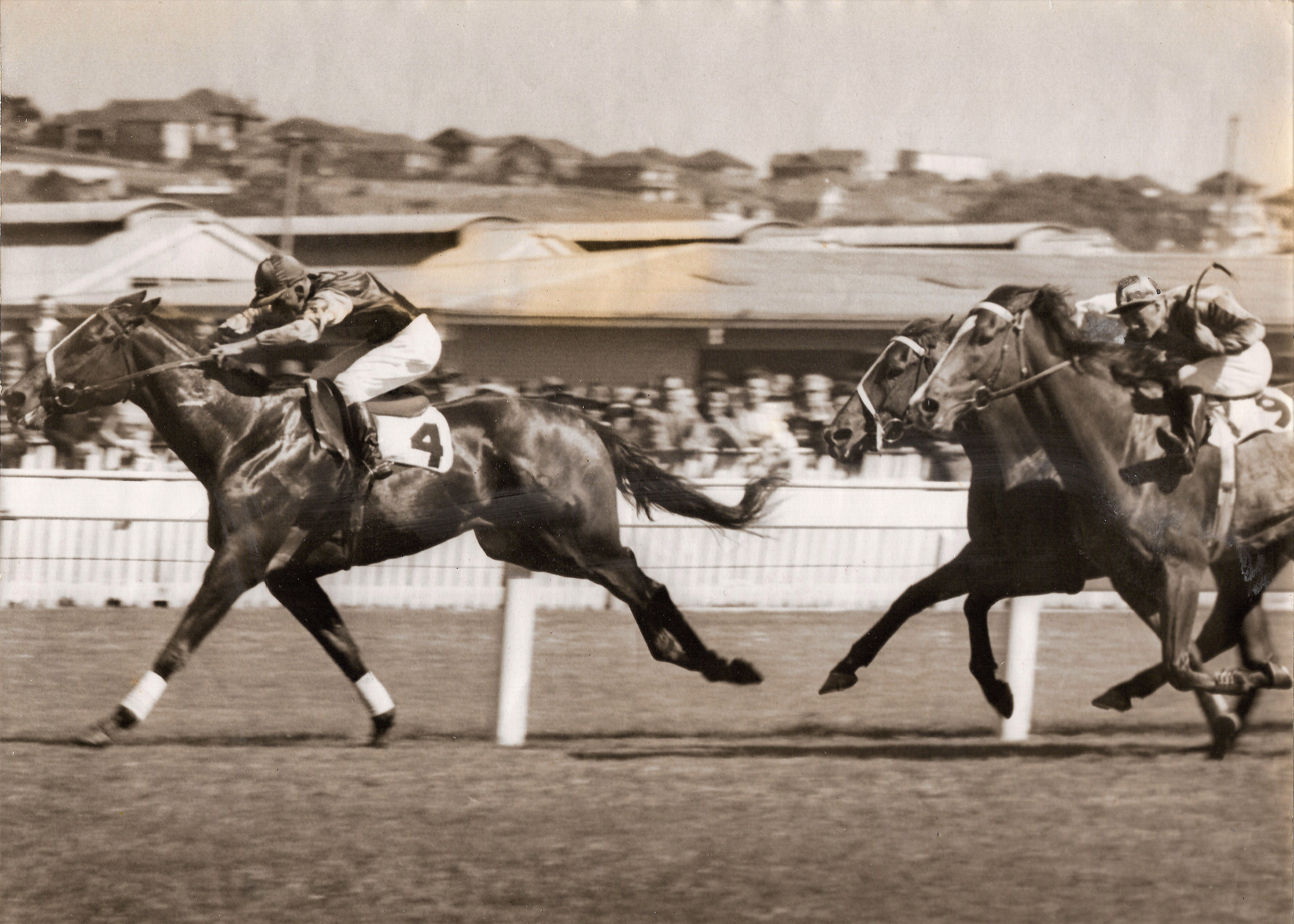
San Domenico – 1950 & 1951 winner

== Winners ==
The following are past winners of the race.

- 2026 - Joliestar
- 2025 - Royal Patronage
- 2024 - Lady Laguna
- 2023 - Artorius
- 2022 - Forbidden Love
- 2021 - Mizzy ^{(*)}
- 2020 - The Bostonian
- 2019 - Trapeze Artist
- 2018 - Happy Clapper
- 2017 - Le Romain
- 2016 - Holler
- 2015 - Cosmic Endeavour
- 2014 - Appearance
- 2013 - Pierro
- 2012 - More Joyous
- 2011 - More Joyous
- 2010 - Hot Danish
- 2009 - All Silent
- 2008 - Mentality
- 2007 - Malcolm
- 2006 - Paratroopers
- 2005 - Dance Hero
- 2004 - Yell
- 2003 - Defier
- 2002 - Empire
- 2001 - Shogun Lodge
- 2000 - Easy Rocking
- 1999 - Kidman’s Cove
- 1998 - Quick Flick
- 1997 - All Our Mob
- 1996 - Sprint By
- 1995 - Miss Kariba
- 1994 - Al Akbar
- 1993 - Big Dreams
- 1992 - Alishan
- 1991 - Show County
- 1990 - Straussbrook
- 1989 - At Sea
- 1988 - At Sea
- 1987 - Placid Ark
- 1986 - Avon Angel
- 1985 - Chimes Square
- 1984 - Sir Dapper
- 1983 - Emancipation
- 1982 - Manikato
- 1981 - Turf Ruler
- 1980 - Stage Hit
- 1979 - Bernard
- 1978 - †race not held
- 1977 - Romantic Dream
- 1976 - Hartshill
- 1975 - Leica Show
- 1974 - Favoured
- 1973 - I’m Scarlet
- 1972 - Playbill
- 1971 - Baguette
- 1970 - Broker’s Tip
- 1969 - Fair Law
- 1968 - Cabochon
- 1967 - Prince Max
- 1966 - Academy Star
- 1965 - Aureo
- 1964 - Eskimo Prince
- 1963 - Kevejon
- 1962 - Sky High
- 1961 - Sky High
- 1960 - Wanton Lass
- 1959 - Up and Coming
- 1958 - ‡race not held
- 1957 - Prince Jambo
- 1956 - Starover
- 1955 - Star Realm
- 1954 - Iroquois
- 1953 - Regoli
- 1952 - Joy Lad
- 1951 - San Domenico
- 1950 - San Domenico
- 1949 - Bernbrook
- 1948 - Gay Monarch
- 1947 - Shannon
- 1946 - Good Idea
- 1945 - Sleepy Fox
- 1944 - Tea Rose
- 1943 - Katanga
- 1942 - Yaralla
- 1941 - Reading
- 1940 - Beaulivre
- 1939 - Beau Vite
- 1938 - Gold Rod
- 1937 - The Marne
- 1936 - Arachne
- 1935 - Bulldozer
- 1934 - Lough Neagh
- 1933 - Chatham
- 1932 - Holdfast
- 1931 - Holdfast
- 1930 - Holdfast
- 1929 - Amounis

† Change in scheduling of race from spring to autumn
‡ Meeting abandoned

Notes:

- ^(*) 2021 Mizzy promoted as winner after disqualification of Savatiano for positive swab.

== See also ==
- List of Australian Group races
- Group races
