= Nash Rawiller =

Australian jockey

Personal information
- Born: 8 December 1974 (age 51) Australia
- Occupation: Jockey

Horse racing career
- Sport: Horse racing

Major racing wins
- Caulfield Cup; Doncaster Handicap; Dubai Turf; Golden Slipper Stakes; Hong Kong Sprint

Honours
- Sydney Jockeys Title (2009, 2010, 2011, 2012 season)

Significant horses
- Elvstroem, More Joyous, Pierro

Nash Rawiller (born 8 December 1974) is a prominent Australian jockey, based in Sydney. He has ridden races in many other parts of the world, including France, Great Britain, Hong Kong, Italy, New Zealand, Singapore and United Arab Emirates. He began his career in Victoria but moved to Sydney in 2007 to link up with prominent trainer Gai Waterhouse. Waterhouse has described Rawiller as "a brilliant rider".

Rawiller has won many significant races including 66 Group One wins, one of which was the lucrative 2005 Dubai Duty Free valued at $1.3 million, but his biggest win to date is riding Elvstroem to victory in the 2004 Caulfield Cup.

He has ridden in Australia's richest horse race, the Melbourne Cup on several occasions.

As at 31 December 2013, Rawiller has ridden in 7540 races and been placed in 2044 races including 1481 wins. Total prize money for horses ridden by Rawiller is over $87 million. He is a three-time winner of the Sydney jockeys title.

== Major wins ==
Australia

- All Aged Stakes – (2) – Bentley Biscuit (2007), Hana's Goal (2014)
- ATC Sires' Produce Stakes – (3) – Manhattan Rain (2009), Pierro (2012), Peggy Jean (2014)
- Australian Oaks – (2) – Once Were Wild (2010), Royal Descent (2013)
- Canterbury Stakes – (3) – More Joyous (2011, 2012), The Bostonian (2020)
- Caulfield Cup – (1) – Elvstroem (2004)
- Caulfield Stakes – (2) – Casual Pass (2006), Descarado (2011)
- Champagne Stakes – (2) – Meurice (2007), Pierro (2012)
- Coolmore Stud Stakes – (2) – So Gorgeous (2000), Northern Meteor (2008)
- Doncaster Handicap – (2) – Rangirangdoo (2010), More Joyous (2012)
- Doomben 10,000 – (2) – Bel Esprit (2003), Eduardo (2021)
- Doomben Cup – (1) – Mawingo (2012)
- Empire Rose Stakes – (1) – Red Tracer (2013)
- Flight Stakes – (1) – More Joyous (2009)
- Futurity Stakes – (2) – More Joyous (2011), Mufhasa (2012)
- George Ryder Stakes – (2) – Pierro (2013), Dreamforce (2020)
- Golden Slipper Stakes – (1) – Pierro (2012)
- J. J. Atkins – (2) – Pressday (2010), Romantic Touch (2013)
- Kennedy Oaks – (1) – Kirramosa (2013)
- Kingsford-Smith Cup – (1) – Bentley Biscuit (2007)
- Manikato Stakes – (2) – Piavonic (2001), Typhoon Zed (2008)
- Norton Stakes – (1) – Theseo (2010)
- Oakleigh Plate – (1) – Sudurka (2002)
- Perth Railway Stakes – (1) – Sniper's Bullet (2009)
- Ranvet Stakes – (3) – Theseo (2009, 2010), Silent Achiever (2014)
- Rosehill Guineas – (3) – Zabrasive (2010), Laser Hawk (2012), Lindermann (2023)
- Stradbroke Handicap – (1) – Black Piranha (2010)
- Surround Stakes – (2) – More Joyous (2010), Forbidden Love (2021)
- Orr Stakes – (1) – Elvstroem (2005)
- Moir Stakes – (2) – Show No Emotion (1998), Our Egyptian Raine (2003)
- Queen Elizabeth Stakes – (3) – My Kingdom of Fife (2011), More Joyous (2012), Think It Over (2022)
- Queen of the Turf Stakes – (3) – More Joyous (2011, 2012), Atishu (2023)
- Tancred Stakes – (1) – Silent Achiever (2014)
- Tattersall's Tiara – (2) – Porto Roca (2001), Red Tracer (2013)
- The Galaxy – (2) – Tiger Tees (2014), Eduardo (2021)
- The Metropolitan – (2) – Herculian Prince (2010), Mirage Dancer (2020)
- TJ Smith Stakes – (2) – Bentley Biscuit (2007), Takeover Target (2009)
- Toorak Handicap – (2) – More Joyous (2010), Solzhenitsyn (2013)
- Turnbull Stakes – (1) – Elvstroem (2004)
- VRC Champions Sprint – (1) – Rubitano (2002)
- VRC Champions Stakes – (1) – Theseo (2008)
- Underwood Stakes – (1) – Elvstroem (2004)
- William Reid Stakes – (1) – Foxwedge (2012)

New Zealand

- Railway Stakes – (1) – Atomic Force (2012)

United Arab Emirates

- Dubai Turf – (1) – Elvstroem (2005)

Hong Kong

- Hong Kong Sprint – (1) – Mr Stunning (2017)

Macau

- Macau Derby – (1) – The Alfonso (2015)
- Chairman's Challenge Cup – (1) – Famous Jonathn (2023)

== Personal life ==
Rawiller is married to Sarah and has two children. He is from a "racing family"; his brother, Brad and sister Stacey are also jockeys and his brother, Todd is a trainer. Campbell started his riding career as an apprentice in 2019 and has already ridden more than 100 winners. He is now apprenticed to Gai Waterhouse at Randwick. Their father, Keith, was a jumps jockey, and their mother, Elaine, is a nurse.
