= Yaralla (horse) =

Australian Thoroughbred racehorse

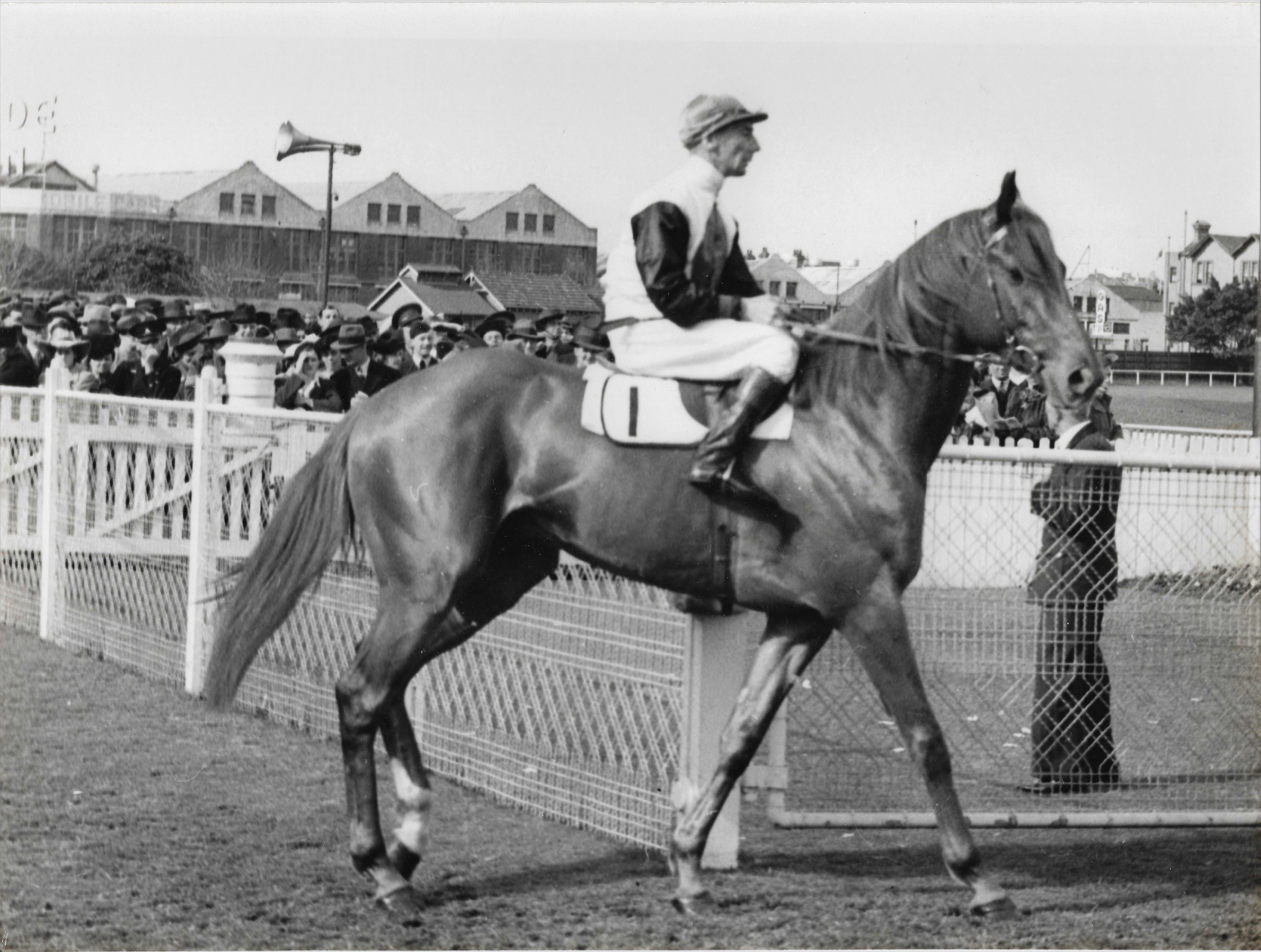
- Yaralla & Ted McMenamin; Randwick Racecourse
- Sire: The Buzzard (GB)
- Grandsire: Spion Kop (GB)
- Dam: Even Keel (AUS)
- Damsire: Highfield (GB)
- Sex: Stallion
- Foaled: 1938
- Country: Australia
- Colour: Chestnut
- Breeder: J.G.McDougall
- Owner: E.P.Walker
- Trainer: F.T.Cush
- Earnings: £13,915

Major wins
- AJC Breeders' Plate (1940); Sires Produce Stakes (1941); Villiers Stakes (1941); Hill Stakes (1942,1943); All Aged Stakes (1942, 1943); Warwick Stakes (1942); Craven Plate (1942); Canterbury Stakes (1942); Challenge Stakes (1944)

Yaralla (foaled 1938) was an Australian Thoroughbred racehorse who raced for 5 seasons from a two-year-old to a six-year-old recording major wins from 5 furlongs to 1¼ miles and regular Sydney jockey being Ted McMenamin.

== Breeding ==
Yaralla was bred by J.G.Mcdougall at Lyndhurst Stud Warwick, Queensland. Sire The Buzzard (AUS) was champion Australian sire 1946/47 & 1949/50. Group 1 winners included Buzalong 1938 VATC Caulfield Cup, Old Rowley 1940 VRC Melbourne Cup, Rainbird 1945 VRC Melbourne Cup, Basha Felika 1951 VATC Caulfield Cup and Katanga 1944 & 1945 AJC Chipping Norton Stakes. Grandsire Spion Kop won the 1920 Epsom Derby.

Dam Even Keel was a half sister to Old Rowley 1940 VRC Melbourne Cup.

Owner E. P. 'Monty' Walker paid 1,200 guineas for Yaralla named after the historic Yaralla Estate mansion at Concord, Sydney and was a member of the Sydney Stock Exchange and died in 1948 Double Bay aged 67.

== Racing career ==
Yaralla raced during World War II 1940 -1944 winner of 5 Group 1 races in the modern era and raced exclusively in Sydney with dual wins 1942 & 1943 AJC All Aged Stakes and RRC Hill Stakes.

Trainer Fred Cush’s stables were located at West Kensington, Sydney and trained the champion weight carrying jumper Greensea, Chide 1931 AJC Chipping Norton Stakes, second behind Phar Lap 1931 Hill Stakes and AJC Spring Stakes and the champion New Zealand mare Silver Scorn 1934 AJC Chipping Norton Stakes.

== Stud career ==
Yaralla initially stood at Tarwyn Park Stud in the Bylong Valley however he proved to be an indifferent stallion and in 1948 was relocated to Anambah Station in West Maitland, the former home of Beauford. His best winner at stud proved to be the dual Townsville Cup winner, Yoorana.

== 1942 racebook ==
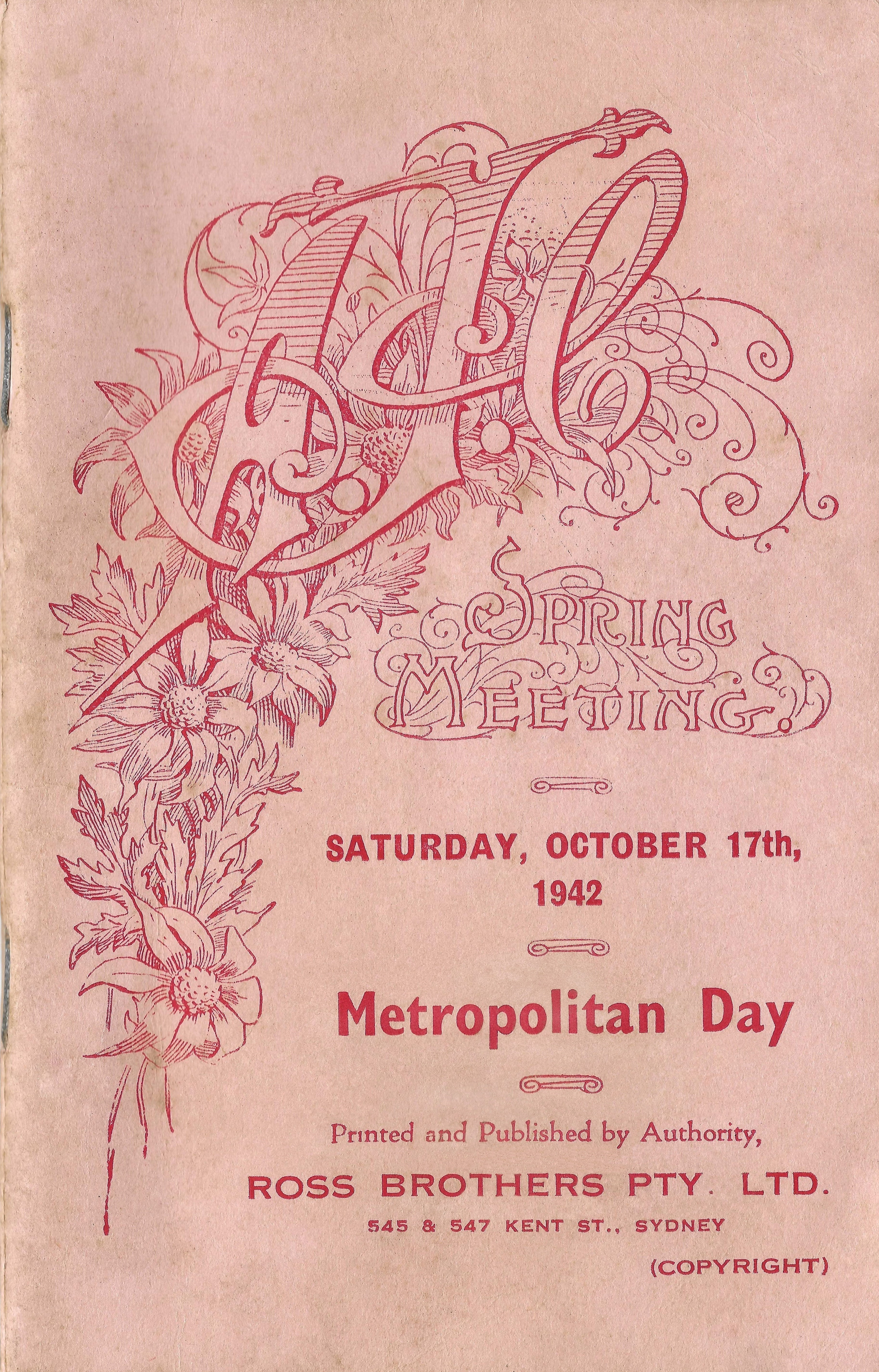
Front cover 1942 AJC Craven Plate racebook.

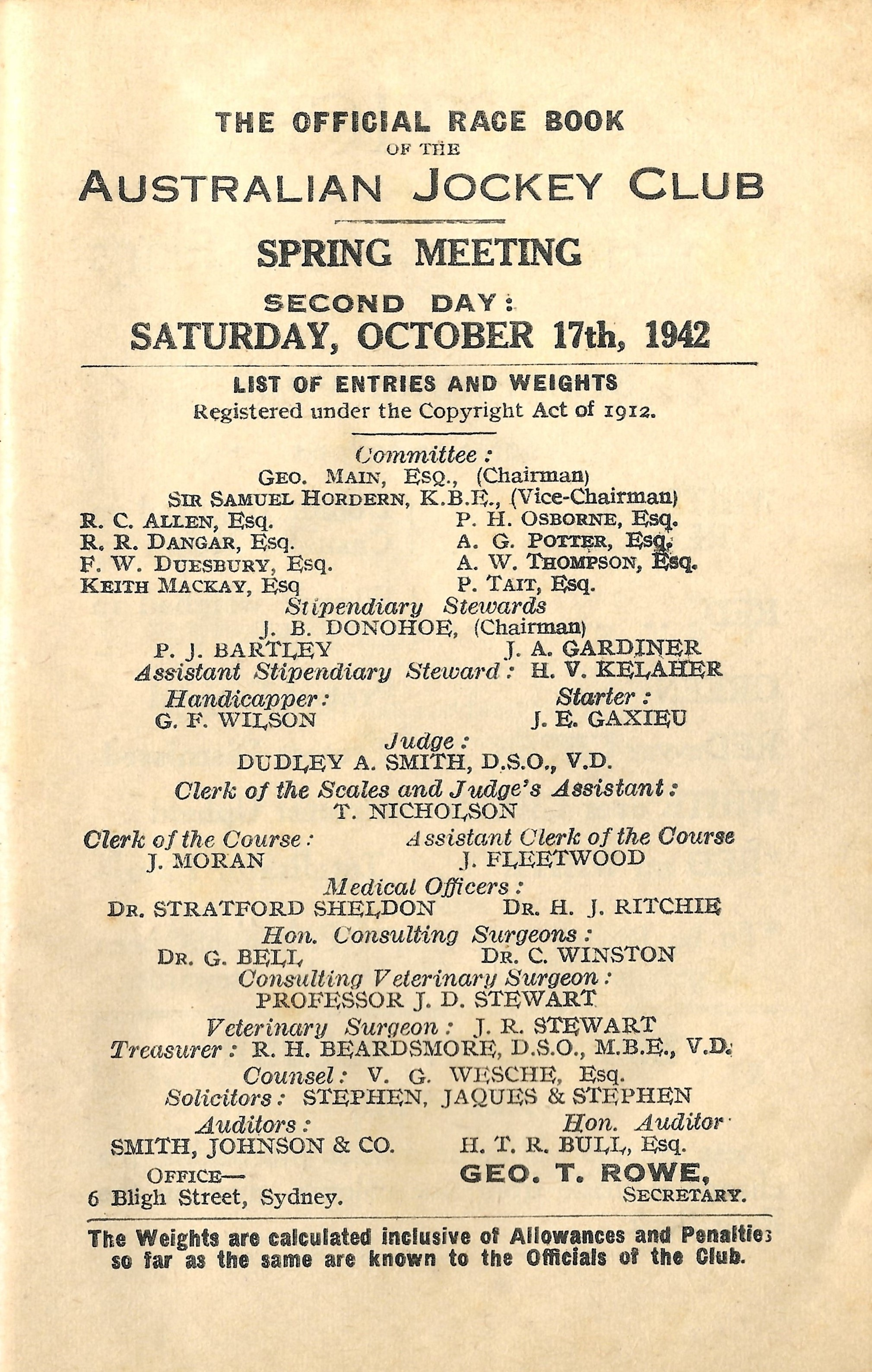
Inside cover showing race day officials.

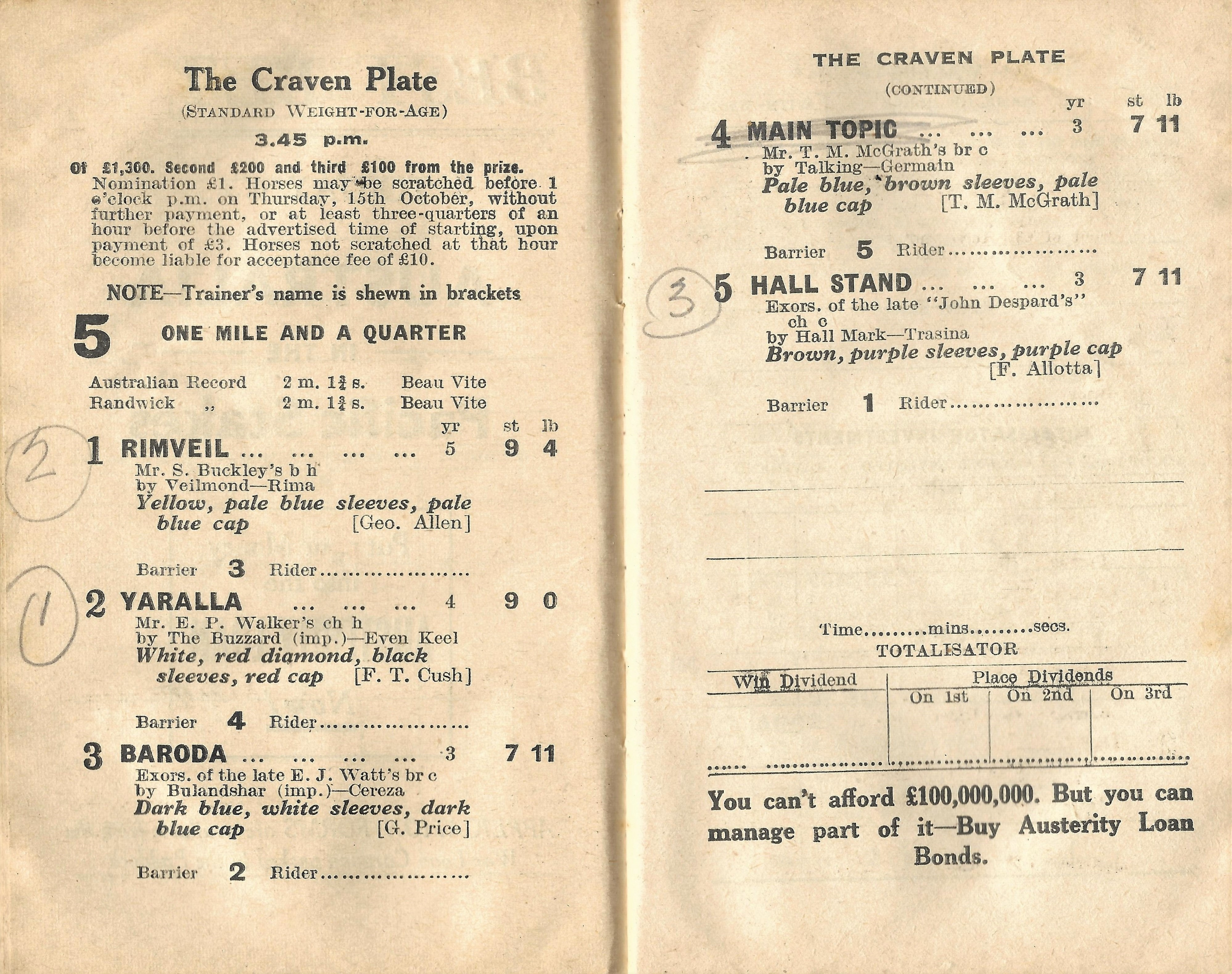
Starters and results showing the winner, Yaralla.

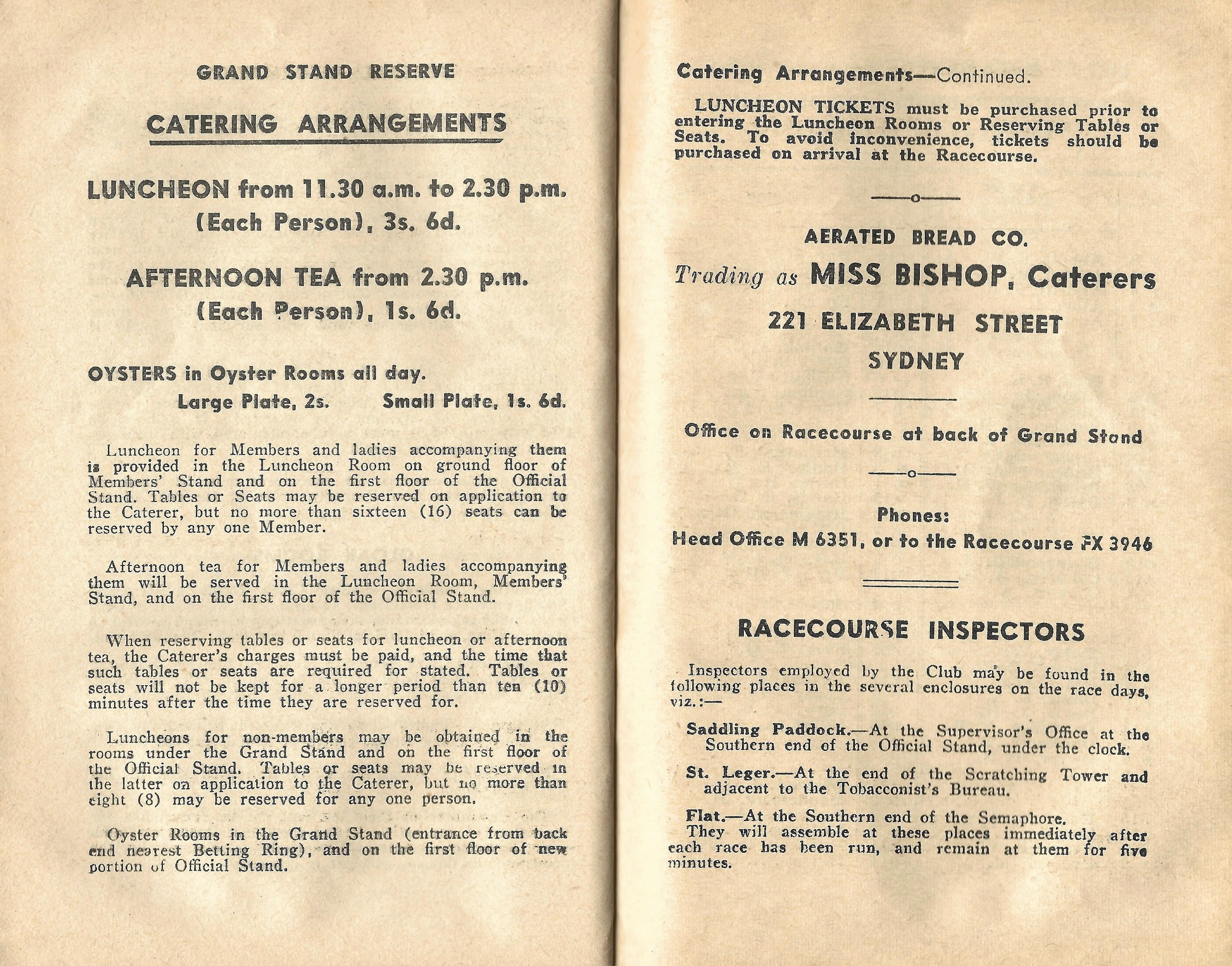
Grand Stand reserve catering arrangements.

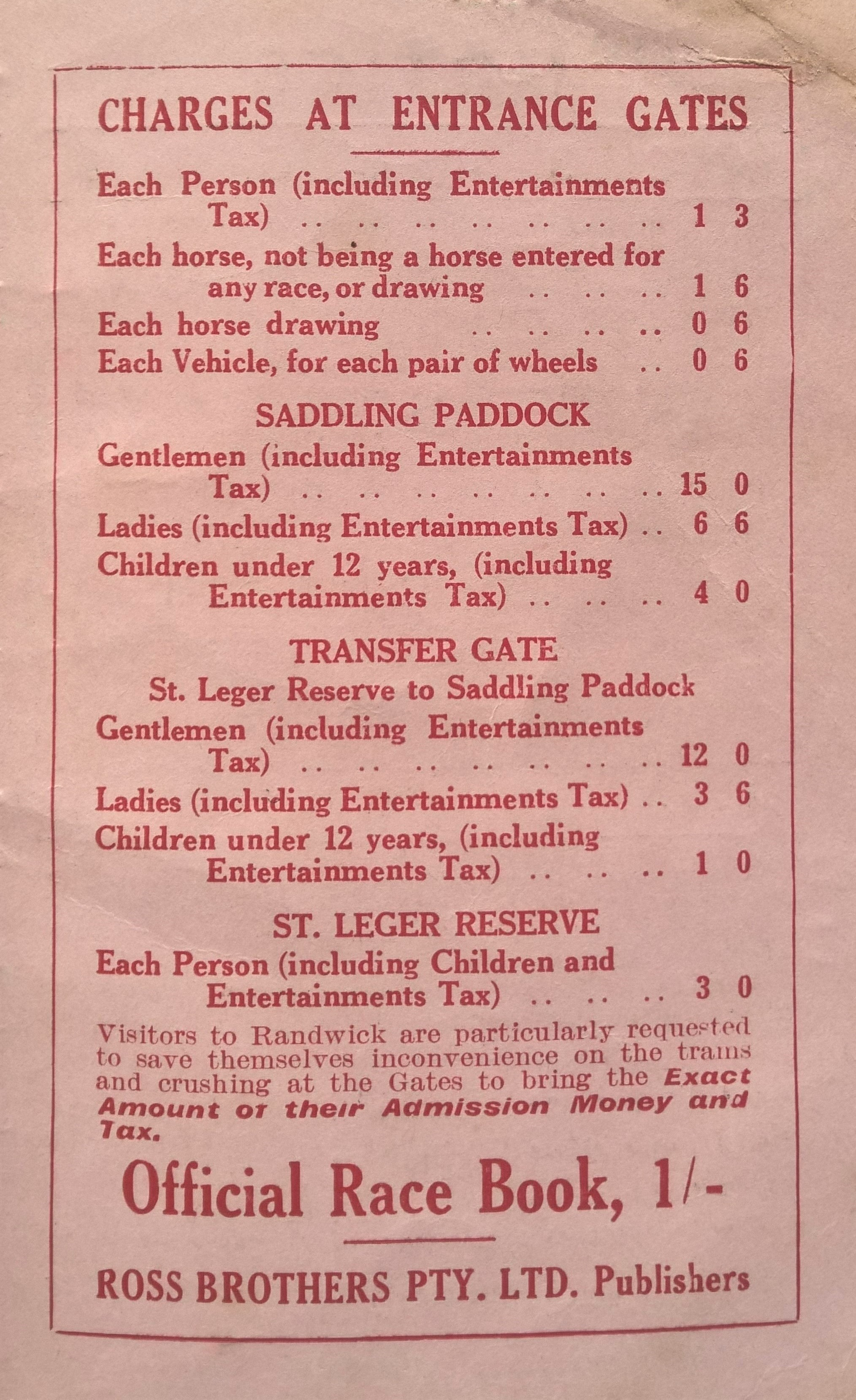
Back cover showing charges at the Entrance Gates.
