= Breeders' Plate =

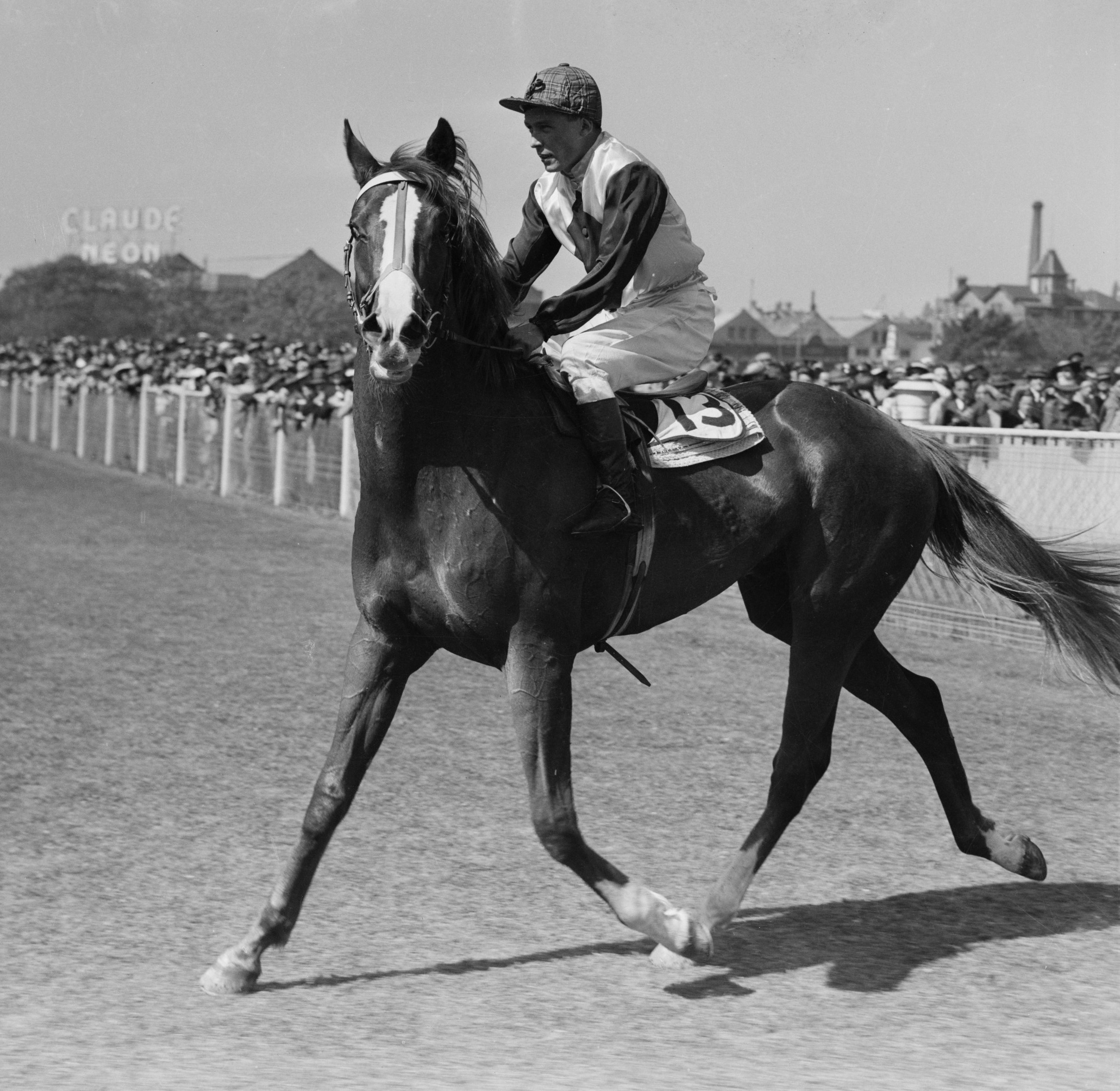
- Magnificent & Pat Delaney
- Class: Group 3
- Location: Randwick Racecourse, Sydney, Australia
- Inaugurated: 1906
- Race type: Thoroughbred - flat
- Sponsor: Arrowfield Stud (2017-2026)

Race information
- Distance: 1,000 metres
- Surface: Turf
- Track: Right-handed
- Qualification: Two year old colts and geldings
- Weight: Set weights
- Purse: A$250,000 (2026)

The Breeders' Plate is an Australian Turf Club Group 3 Thoroughbred horse race, for two-year-old colts and geldings, held with set weight conditions, over a distance of 1000 metres at Randwick Racecourse in Sydney, Australia in early October.

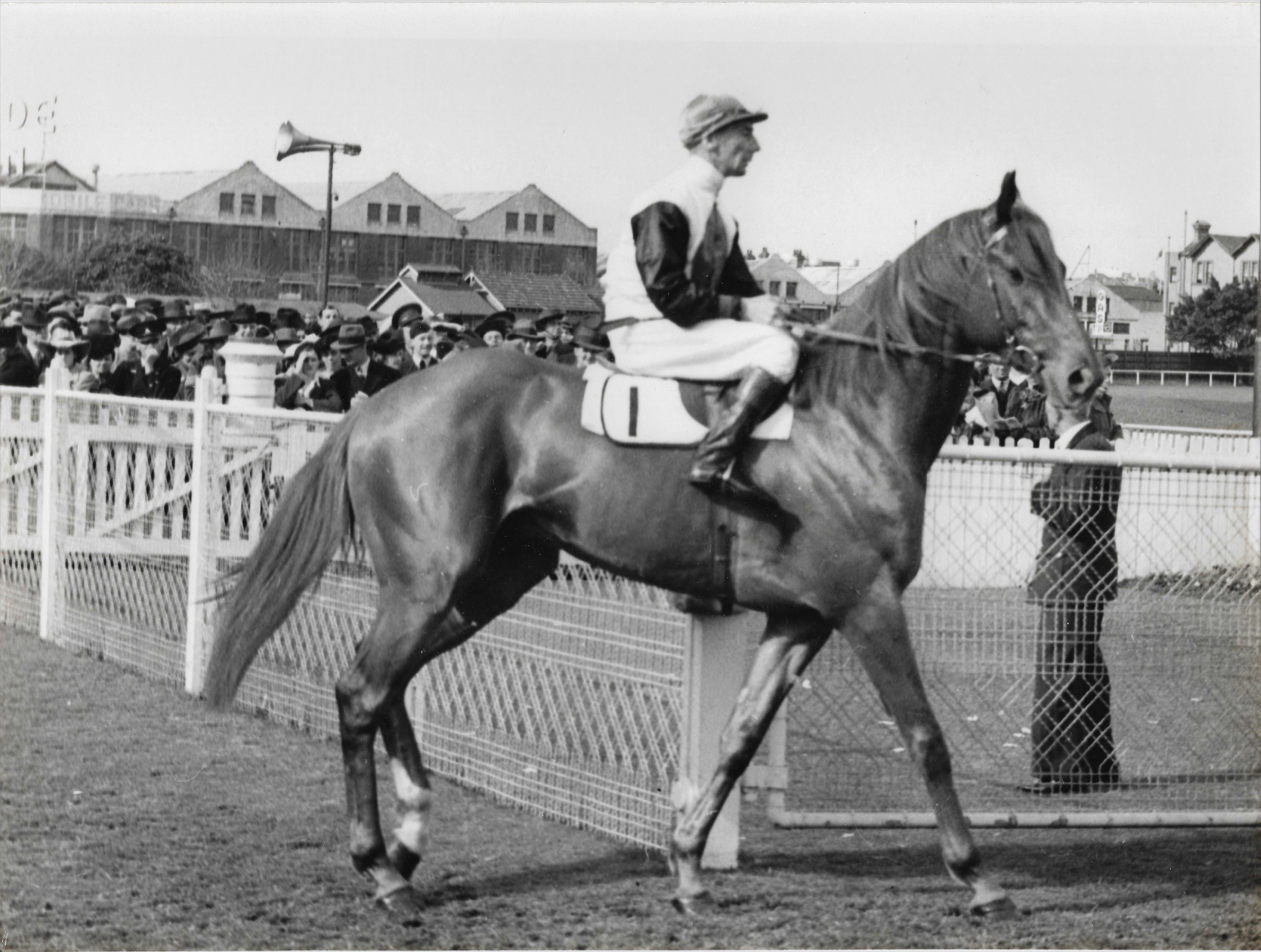
Yaralla, 1940 winner

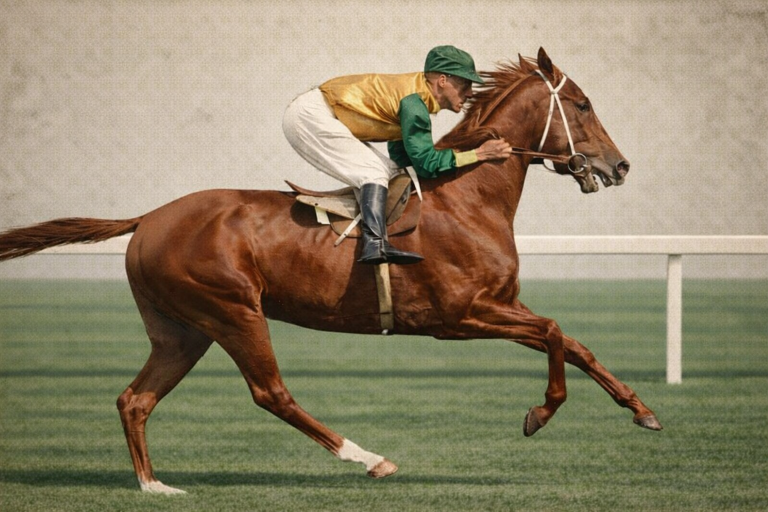
Heroic, 1923 winner

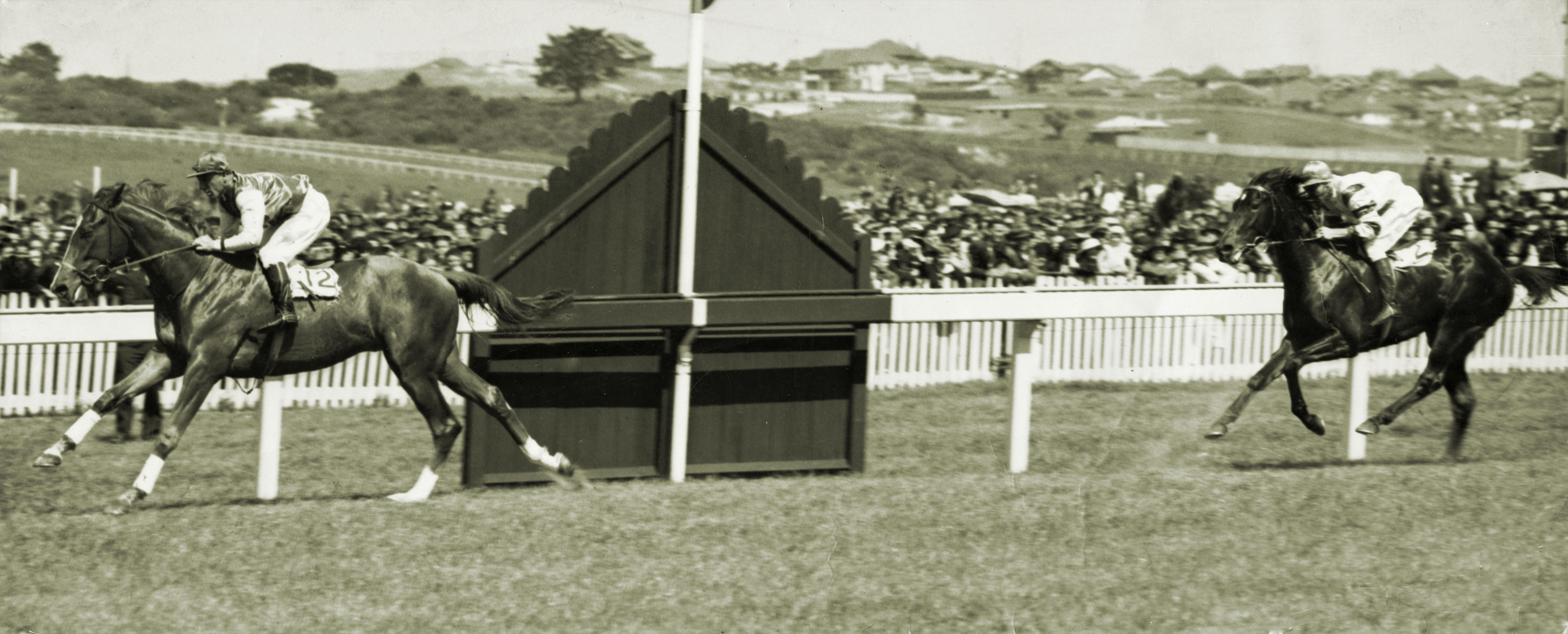
Gold Rod, 1935 winner

== History ==
The event along with the Gimcrack Stakes are the first two year old races in the racing season in New South Wales. Starters in these event must participate in trials a couple of weeks before these event to gain acceptance.

The following thoroughbreds have captured the Breeders' Plate – Golden Slipper Stakes double:
Sky High (1960), Eskimo Prince (1964), Baguette (1970), Luskin Star (1977), Sebring (2008), Pierro (2012), Vancouver (2015), Capitalist (2016).

=== 1942 racebook ===
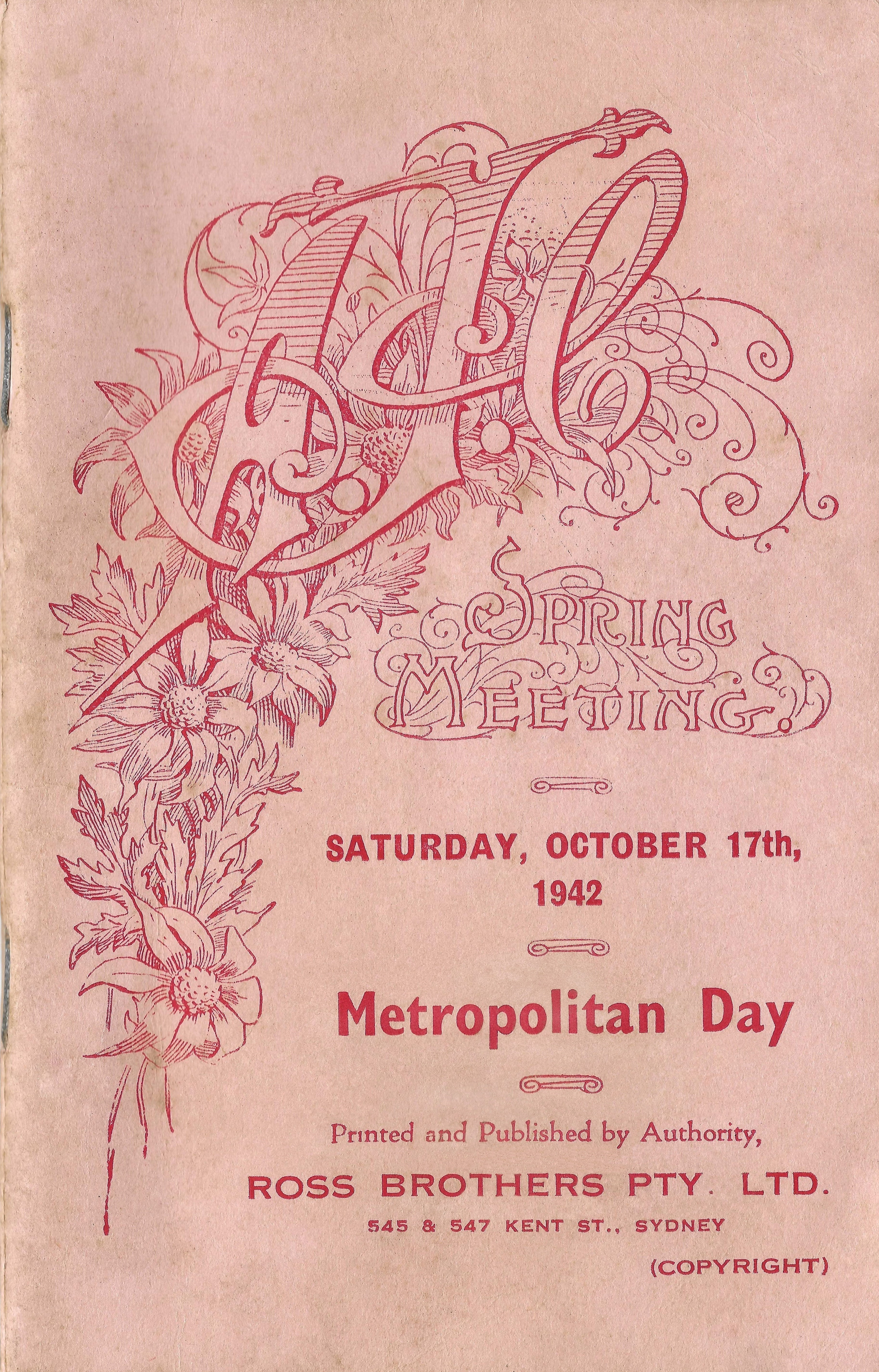
1942 AJC Metropolitan Handicap racebook front cover

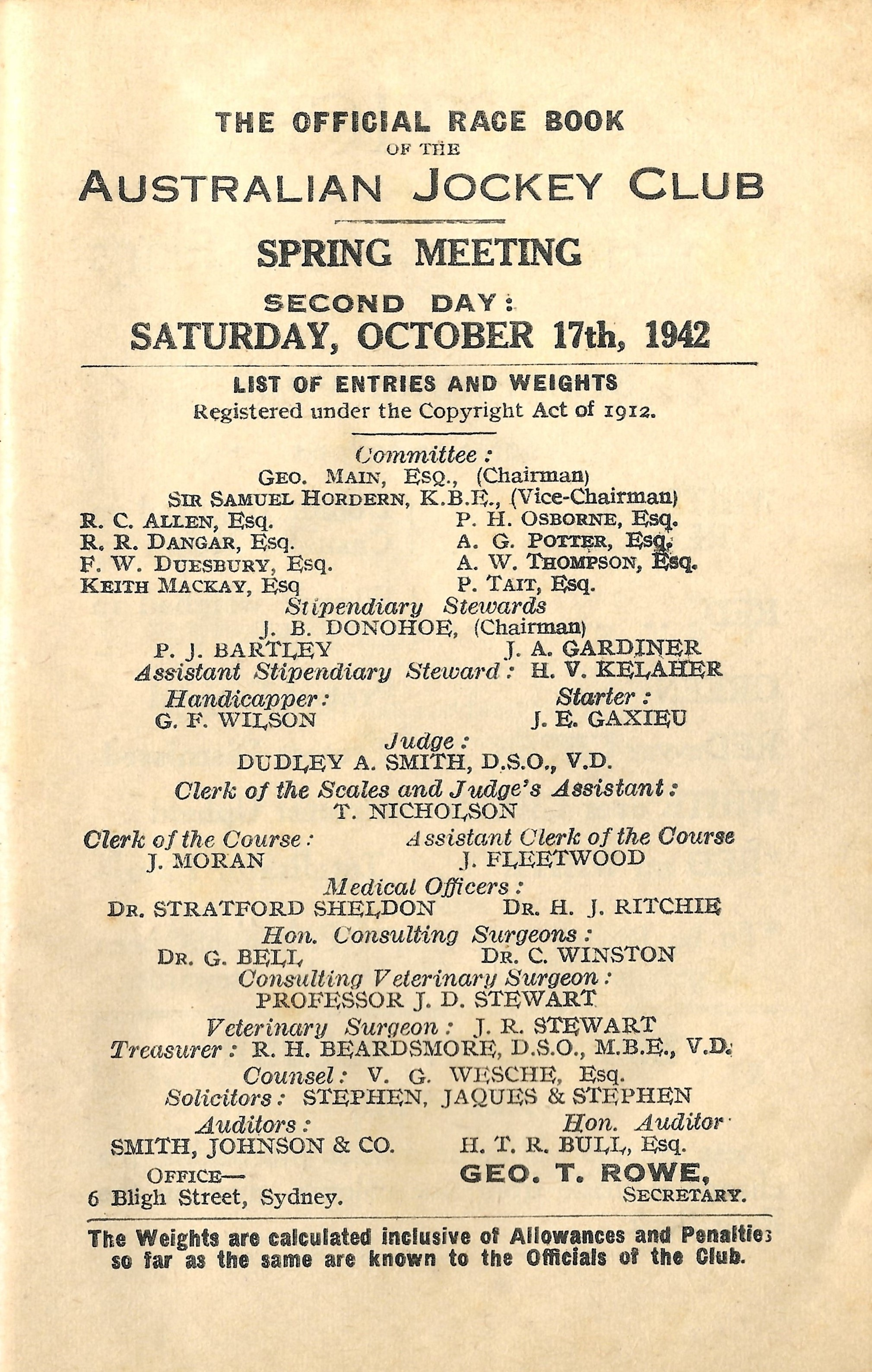
1942 AJC Metropolitan showing raceday officials

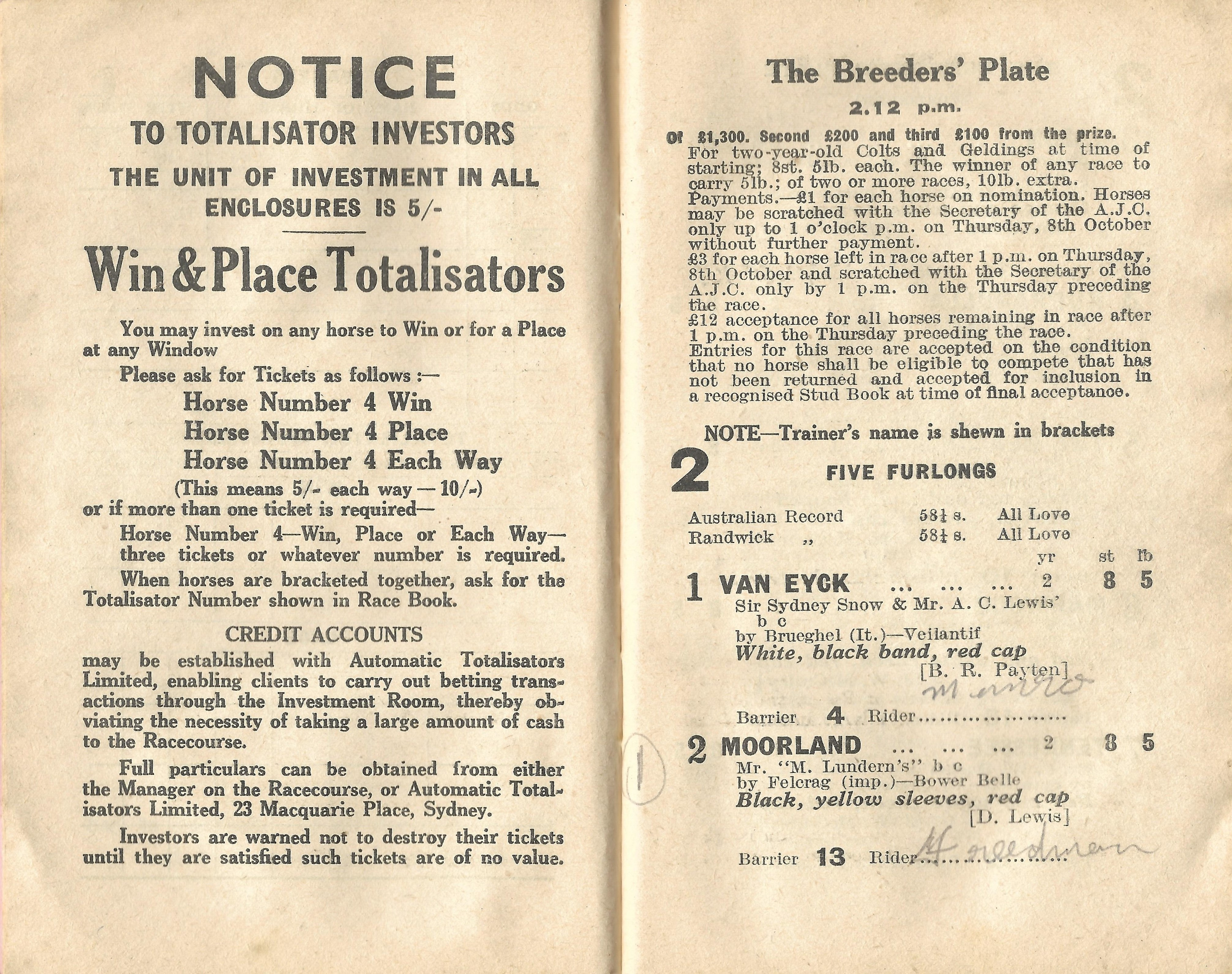
1942 AJC Breeders Plate showing the winner, Moorland

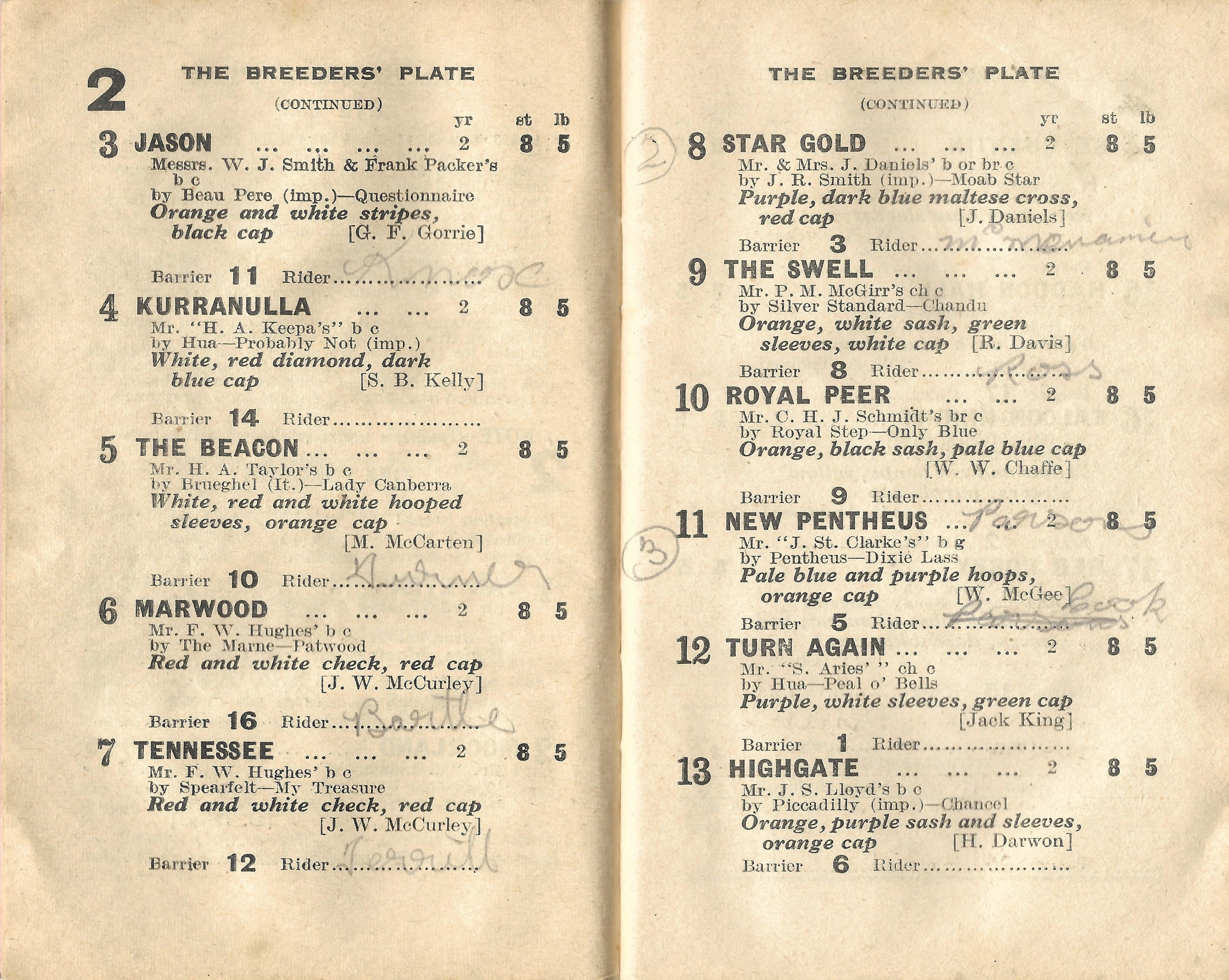
1942 AJC Breeders Plate starters and results

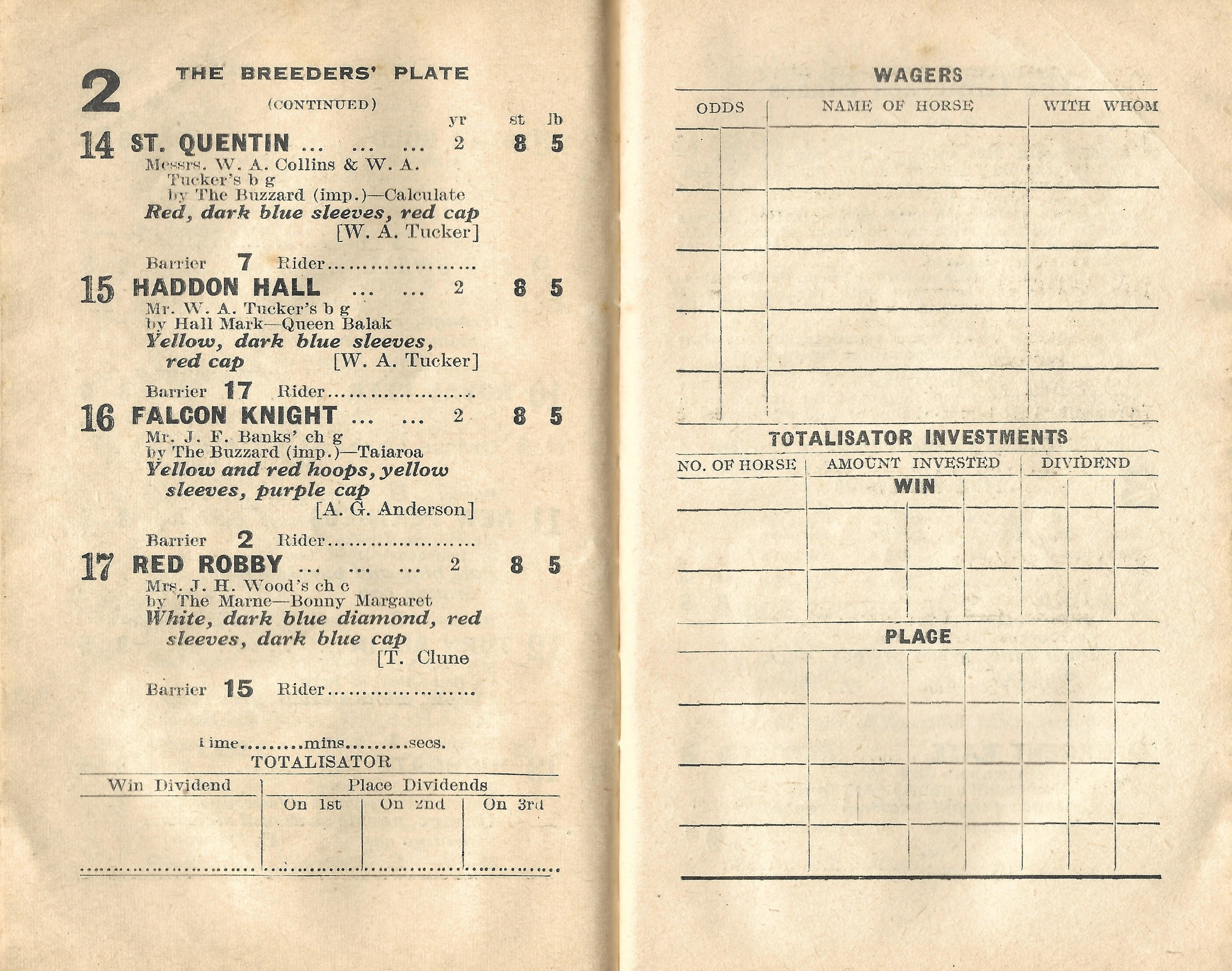
1942 AJC Breeders Plate starters and results

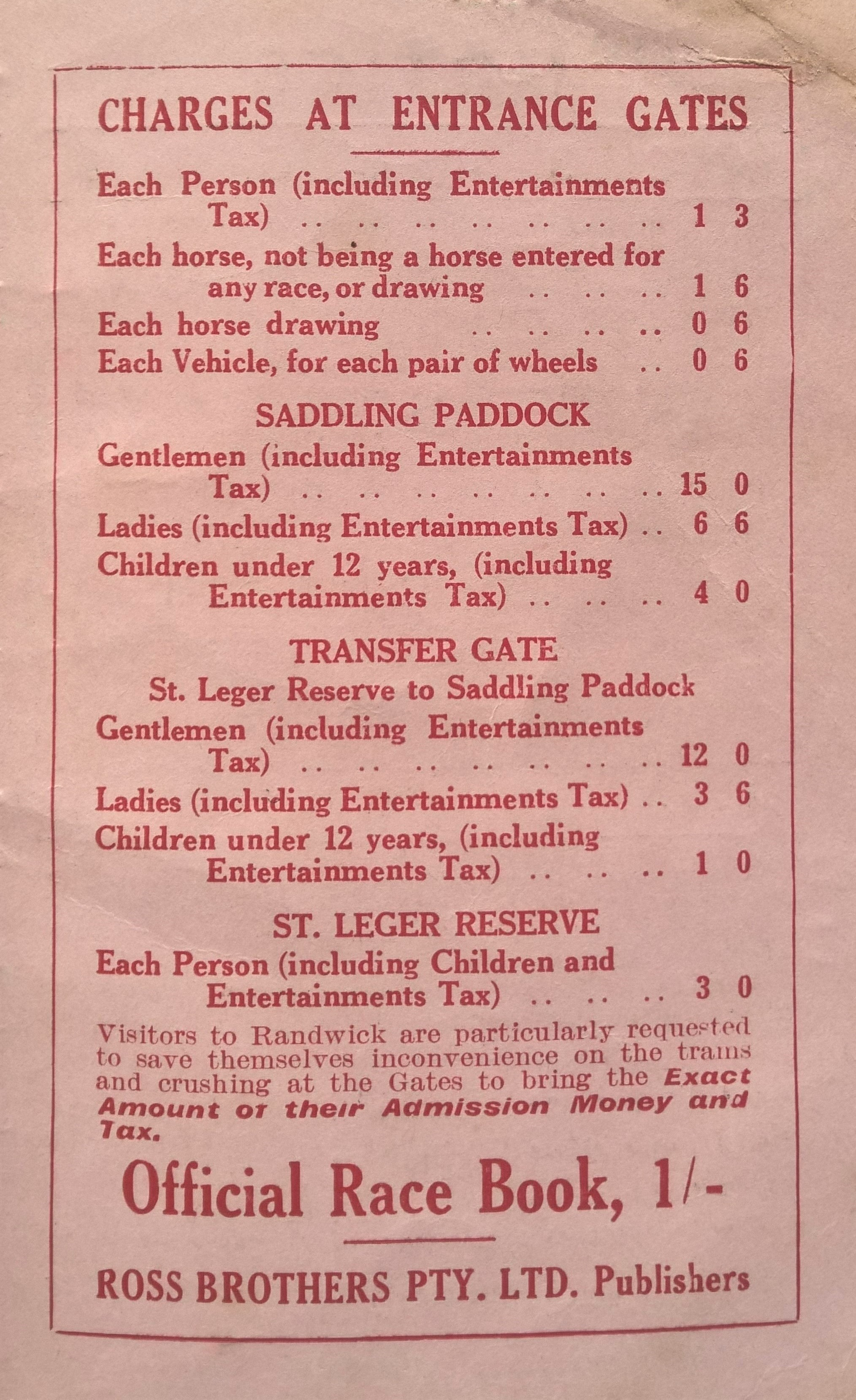
Back cover charges at the entrance gates

=== Distance ===
- 1906–1972 - 5 furlongs (~1000 metres)
- 1973–2007 – 1000 metres
- 2008 – 1100 metres
- 2019 onwards - 1000 metres

=== Grade ===
- 1906–1978 - Principal Race
- 1979–1991 - Group 3
- 1992–2018 - Listed Race
- 2019 onwards - Group 3

=== Venue ===
- 1983, 2001 and 2004 - Warwick Farm Racecourse

== Winners ==
The following are past winners of the race.

- 2026 - Flying Houdini
- 2025 - Incognito
- 2024 - King Kirk
- 2023 - Espionage
- 2022 - Empire Of Japan
- 2021 - Sejardan
- 2020 - Shaquero
- 2019 - Global Quest
- 2018 - Dubious
- 2017 - Performer
- 2016 - Khan
- 2015 - Capitalist
- 2014 - Vancouver
- 2013 - Law
- 2012 - Whittington
- 2011 - Pierro
- 2010 - Smart Missile
- 2009 - Run For Wilson
- 2008 Oct. - Real Saga
- 2008 Mar. - Sebring
- 2007 - ‡race not held and postponed to 1 March 2008
- 2006 - Murtajill
- 2005 - Super Savings
- 2004 - Snitzel
- 2003 - Charge Forward
- 2002 - Ribald
- 2001 - Choisir
- 2000 - Mistegic
- 1999 - Sparks
- 1998 - High Rolling
- 1997 - Mr. Innocent
- 1996 - Encounter
- 1995 - Clang
- 1994 - Ravarda
- 1993 - Marwina
- 1992 - Danger
- 1991 - Ghost Story
- 1990 - Volts
- 1989 - Bounce Again
- 1988 - Show County
- 1987 - Molokai Prince
- 1986 - Maizcay
- 1985 - Pre Catelan
- 1984 - Take Your Partner
- 1983 - My Mate Zero
- 1982 - Palida Bay
- 1981 - Karioi Star
- 1980 - Iandra Lad
- 1979 - Prince Granada
- 1978 - ♯Big Convoy / Starmunda
- 1977 - ♯Smokey Jack / Karion
- 1976 - ♯Luskin Star /Star System
- 1975 - ♯Blue And Gold / Count Rajan
- 1974 - Ein Prosit
- 1973 - Definate
- 1972 - Jewel Thief
- 1971 - Sovereign Slipper
- 1970 - Regal Gauntlet
- 1969 - Baguette
- 1968 - Shifway
- 1967 - Red Pilot
- 1966 - Pratten Park
- 1965 - Nebo Road
- 1964 - Peace Council
- 1963 - Eskimo Prince
- 1962 - Romanda
- 1961 - High Vista
- 1960 - Young Brolga
- 1959 - Sky High
- 1958 - Front Cover
- 1957 - Mighty Kingdom
- 1956 - Flying Kurana
- 1955 - Rumleigh
- 1954 - Kingster
- 1953 - Lindbergh
- 1952 - First Chapte
- 1951 - Joy Lad
- 1950 - Lloric
- 1949 - Nirandoli
- 1948 - High Jip
- 1947 - Riptide
- 1946 - Temeraire
- 1945 - Havoc
- 1944 - Magnificent
- 1943 - Victory Lad
- 1942 - Moorland
- 1941 - Bangster
- 1940 - Yaralla
- 1939 - Flying Knight
- 1938 - †Royal Sceptre / Beaucaire
- 1937 - Pandava
- 1936 - Rodborough
- 1935 - Gold Rod
- 1934 - Wise Boy
- 1933 - Fashion Star
- 1932 - Limarch
- 1931 - Caramba
- 1930 - Movie Star
- 1929 - Delwood
- 1928 - Gold Tinge
- 1927 - Ramulus
- 1926 - Beckwith
- 1925 - Rampion
- 1924 - Nincompoop
- 1923 - Heroic
- 1922 - King Carnival
- 1921 - Salrak
- 1920 - Vaccine
- 1919 - Cool Light
- 1918 - Bundella
- 1917 - Almoner
- 1916 - Baltic Sea
- 1915 - Wolaroi
- 1914 - Del Monte
- 1913 - Eugeny
- 1912 - Beragoon
- 1911 - Ventura
- 1910 - Cisco
- 1909 - Desert Rose
- 1908 - Zilka
- 1907 - Baw Bee
- 1906 - Boniform

† Dead heat
♯ Run in divisions
‡ Not held because of outbreak of equine influenza

== See also ==
- List of Australian Group races
- Group races
