= Gold Rod =

New Zealand-bred Thoroughbred racehorse

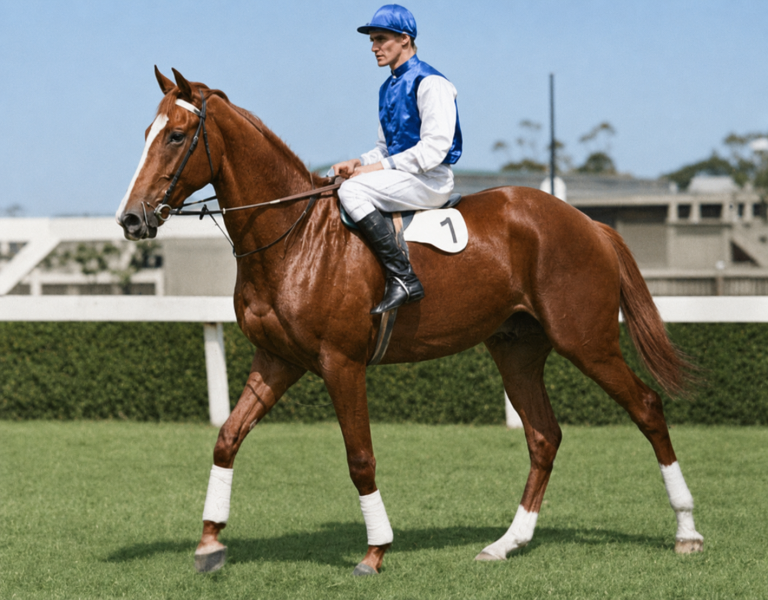
- Gold Rod & Jack Pratt
- Sire: Chief Ruler (GB)
- Grandsire: The Tetrarch (IRE)
- Dam: Oreum (NZ)
- Damsire: King John (IRE)
- Sex: Stallion
- Foaled: 1933
- Country: New Zealand
- Colour: Chestnut
- Breeder: Thomas Lowry
- Owner: E.J.Watt
- Trainer: George Price
- Record: 46:16,5,7
- Earnings: £18,920

Major wins
- AJC Breeders Plate (1935); VRC Sires' Produce Stakes (1936); AJC Sires Produce Stakes (1936); Hobartville Stakes (1936); Chelmsford Stakes (1936); Futurity Stakes (1937); AJC St Leger (1937); Epsom Handicap (1937); VRC Essendon Stakes (1937); Canterbury Stakes (1938); Hill Stakes (1938, 1939); Doncaster Handicap (1939); Frederick Clissold Stakes (1940)

Gold Rod was a New Zealand bred chestnut thoroughbred stallion who raced in Australia from a two-year-old to a six-year-old recording 16 wins from 5 furlongs to 1¾ miles with Australian Racing Hall of Fame inductee Maurice McCarten being his regular jockey.

== Breeding ==
Gold Rod (NZ) by Chief Ruler (GB) the leading sire in New Zealand 1929-30 & 1931–32 seasons and was bred by Thomas Lowry in New Zealand was a grandson of the champion mare Desert Gold and sold for 350 guineas to owner E.J.Watt.

Dam Oreum (NZ) produced Gold Rod and Pure Gold who produced Gold Trail winner of the 1933 Clifford Plate and 1934 Auckland Cup

Owner E.J.Watt (1873 - 1942) was a member of the Australian Jockey Club committee and raced extensively in New Zealand before transferring his interests to Australia and owned the Darr River Downs property near Longreach, Queensland and the Boombee property at Molong New South Wales he was also a director of Union Theatres Investments Ltd. Notable horses owned were Mountain Knight 1914 AJC Derby, 1915 AJC St Leger & VRC St Leger, Waikare 1934 Metropolitan Handicap and Mildura 1940 and 1941 Doncaster Handicap.

Gold Rod was purchased later in his career by W.H.Russell from Hāwera for stud duties but died at sea in transit to New Zealand in 1946.

== Racing career ==
Gold Rod raced between 1935 -1940 in an era of champions Ajax, High Caste and Beau Vite winning major W.F.A and Handicap races in Sydney and Melbourne with classic mile wins in the 1937 AJC Epsom Handicap and 1939 AJC Doncaster Handicap at Randwick Racecourse and defeated dual W. S. Cox Plate winner Young Idea in the 1938 Hill Stakes.

Trainer George Price was a former leading jockey in New Zealand his stables were located at Prince Street, Randwick, and had a reputation for integrity and the preparation and management of his horses with major success with Windbag 1925 Melbourne Cup, Beaulivre 1940 Caulfield Cup, Mildura 1940 Newmarket Handicap also 1940 & 1941 Doncaster Handicap and Ballymena 1923 AJC Derby who defeated the champion Gloaming in the 1924 Hill Stakes and the historic win by Spear Chief defeating the champion Ajax at 40 to 1 on in the 1939 Rawson Stakes, stopping Ajax from equalling a record of nineteen consecutive wins.

Gold Rod's racing record: 46 starts for 16 wins, 5 seconds, 7 thirds

== Image Gallery ==
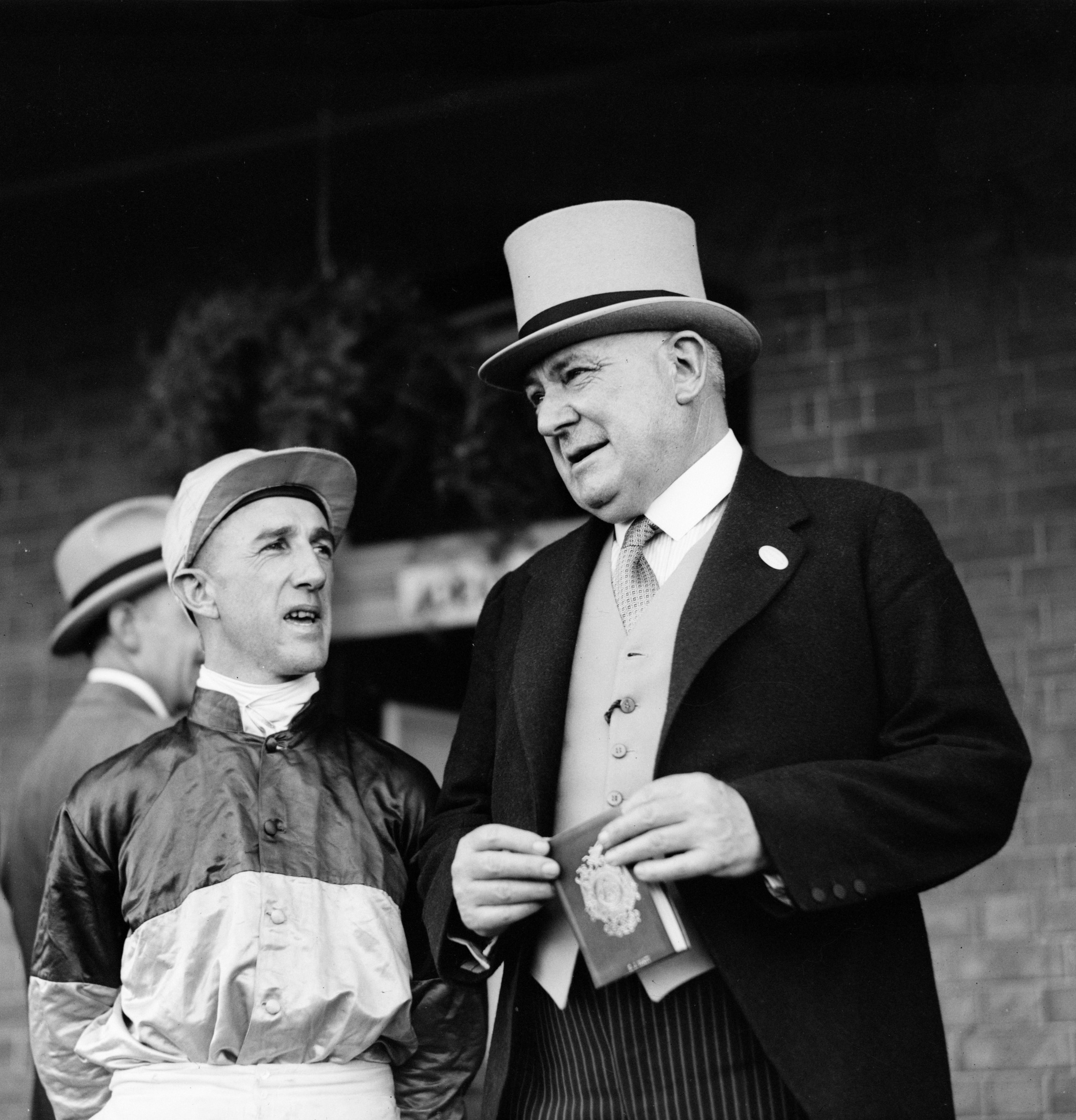
Maurice McCarten & E.J. Watt.

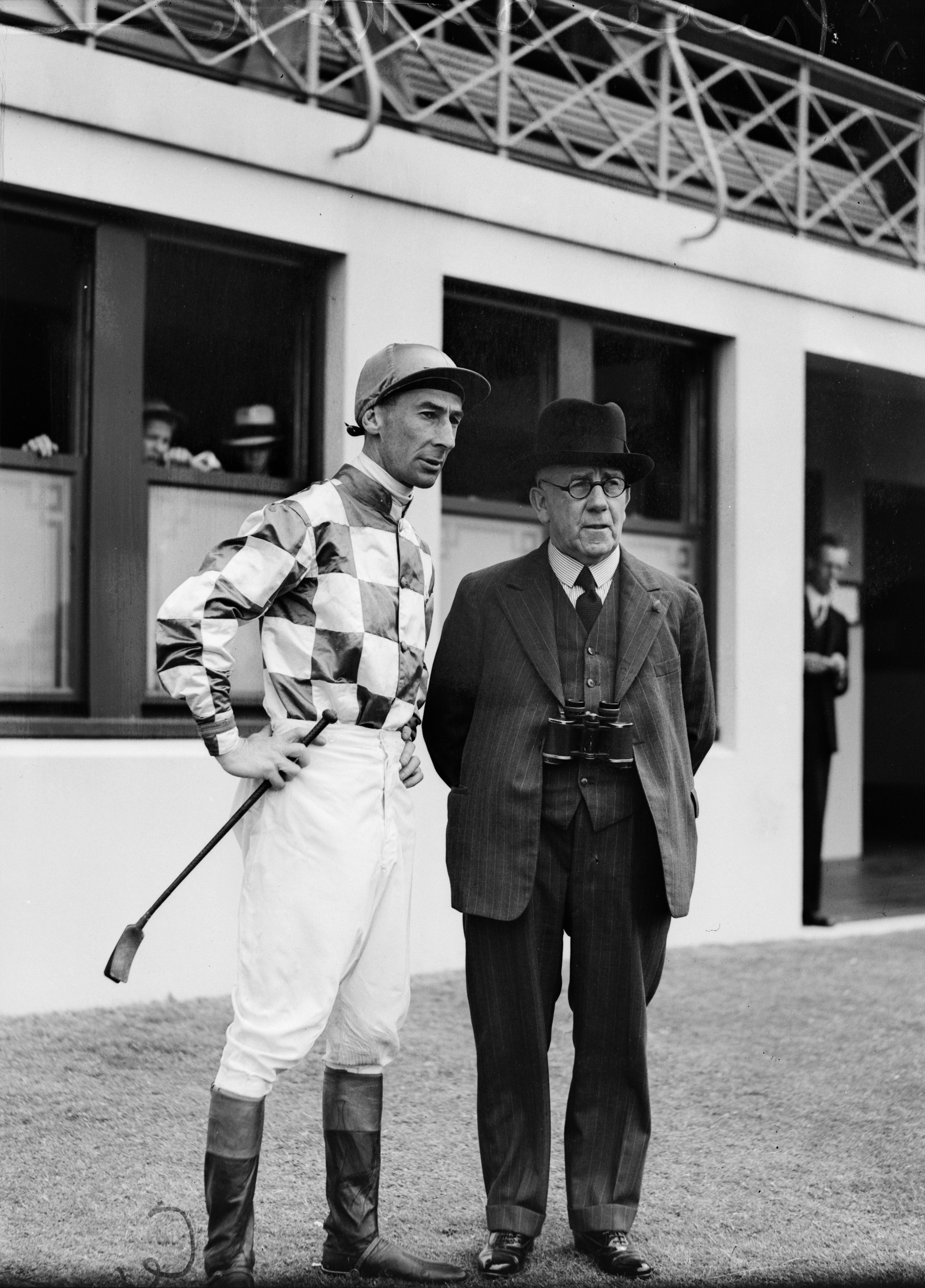
George Price & jockey Ted McMenamin.

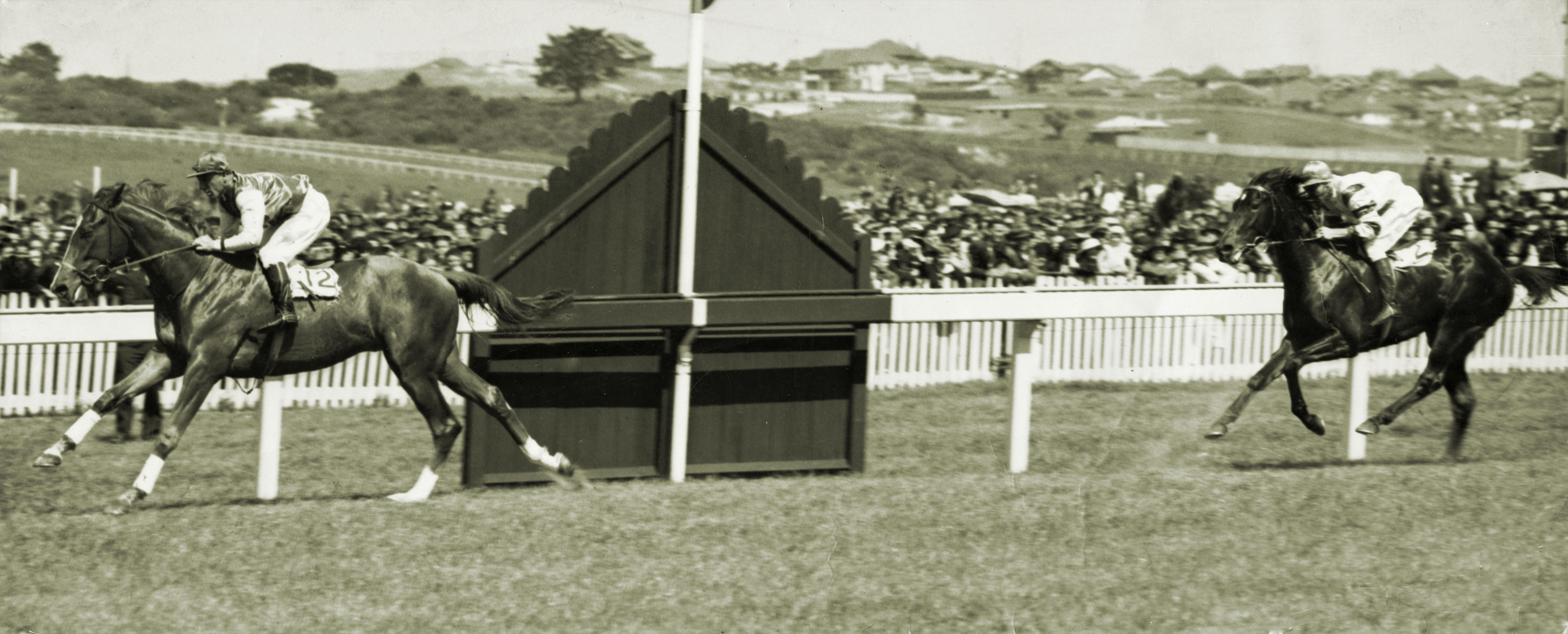
Gold Rod and Maurice McCarten.

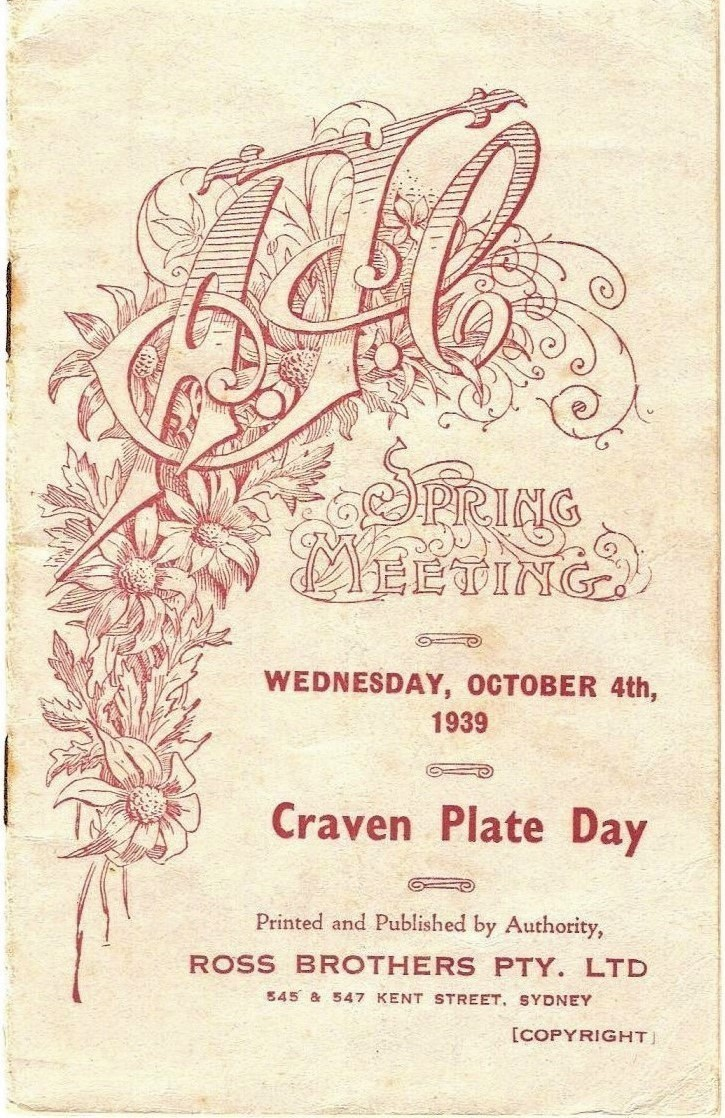
1939 AJC Craven Plate racebook front cover.

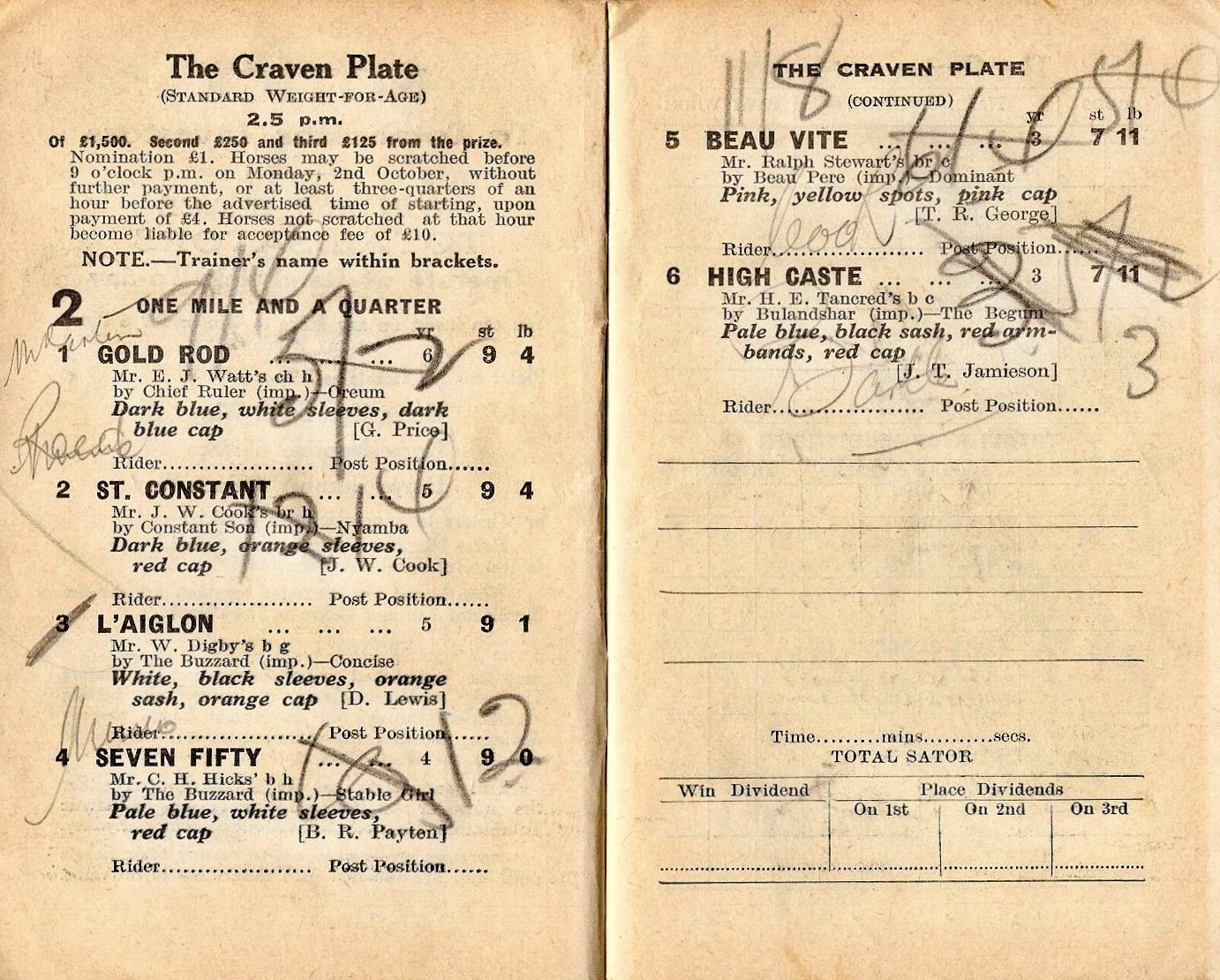
1939 AJC Craven Plate showing Gold Rod placed 3rd.
