= Hill Stakes =

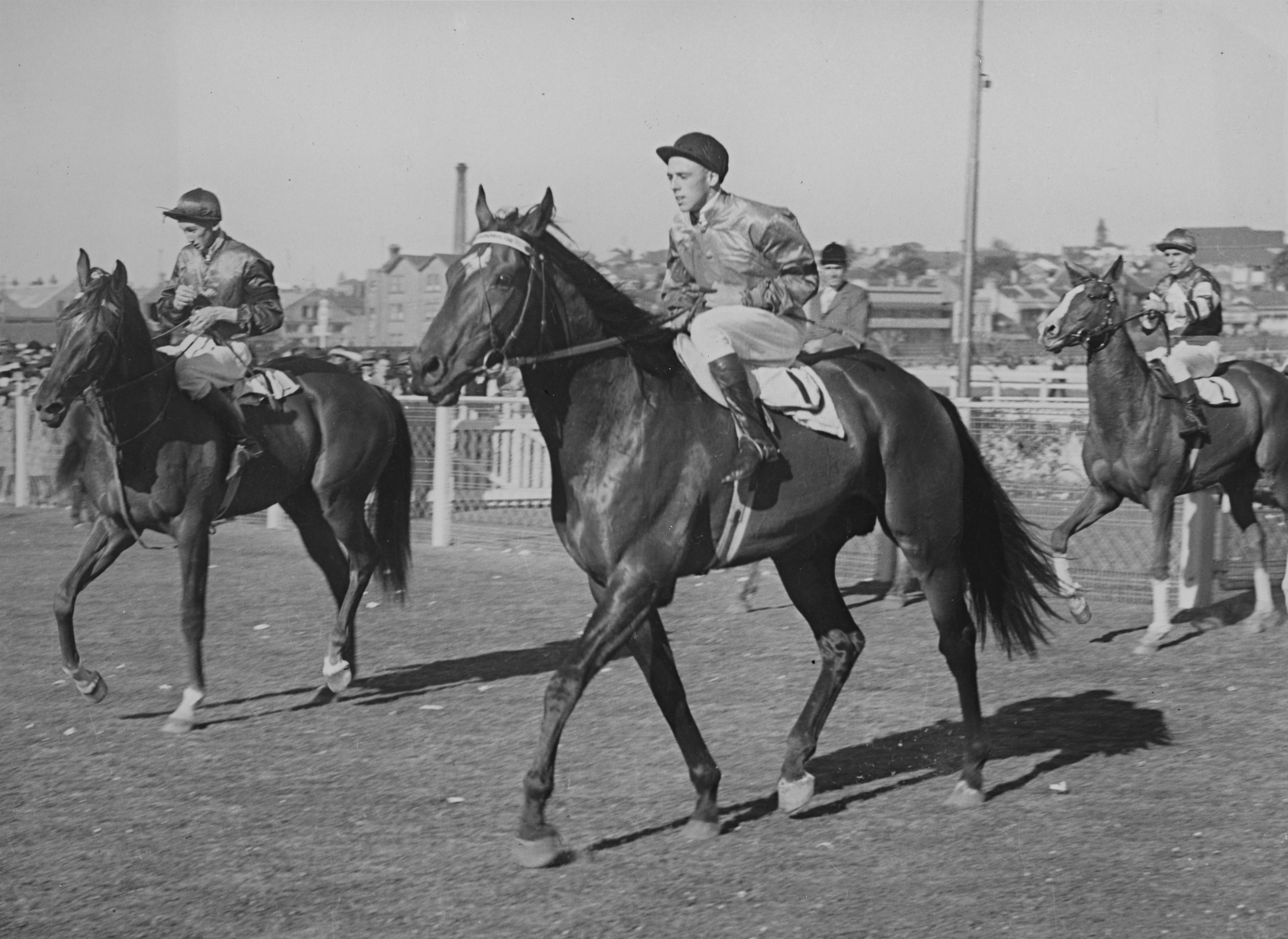
- Bernborough, 1946 winner
- Class: Group 2
- Location: Randwick Racecourse or Rosehill Gardens Racecourse; Sydney, Australia
- Inaugurated: 1921
- Race type: Thoroughbred - flat
- Sponsor: Toyota Forklifts (2024 - 2026)

Race information
- Distance: 1900 or 2000 metres
- Surface: Turf
- Track: Right-handed
- Qualification: Horses three years old and older
- Weight: Weight for Age
- Purse: A$2,000,000 (2026)

The Hill Stakes is an Australian Turf Club Group 2 Thoroughbred horse race run under Weight for Age conditions in Sydney, Australia in September or October. In recent years it has generally been run over a distance of 2000 metres at Randwick Racecourse or 1900m at Rosehill Gardens Racecourse.

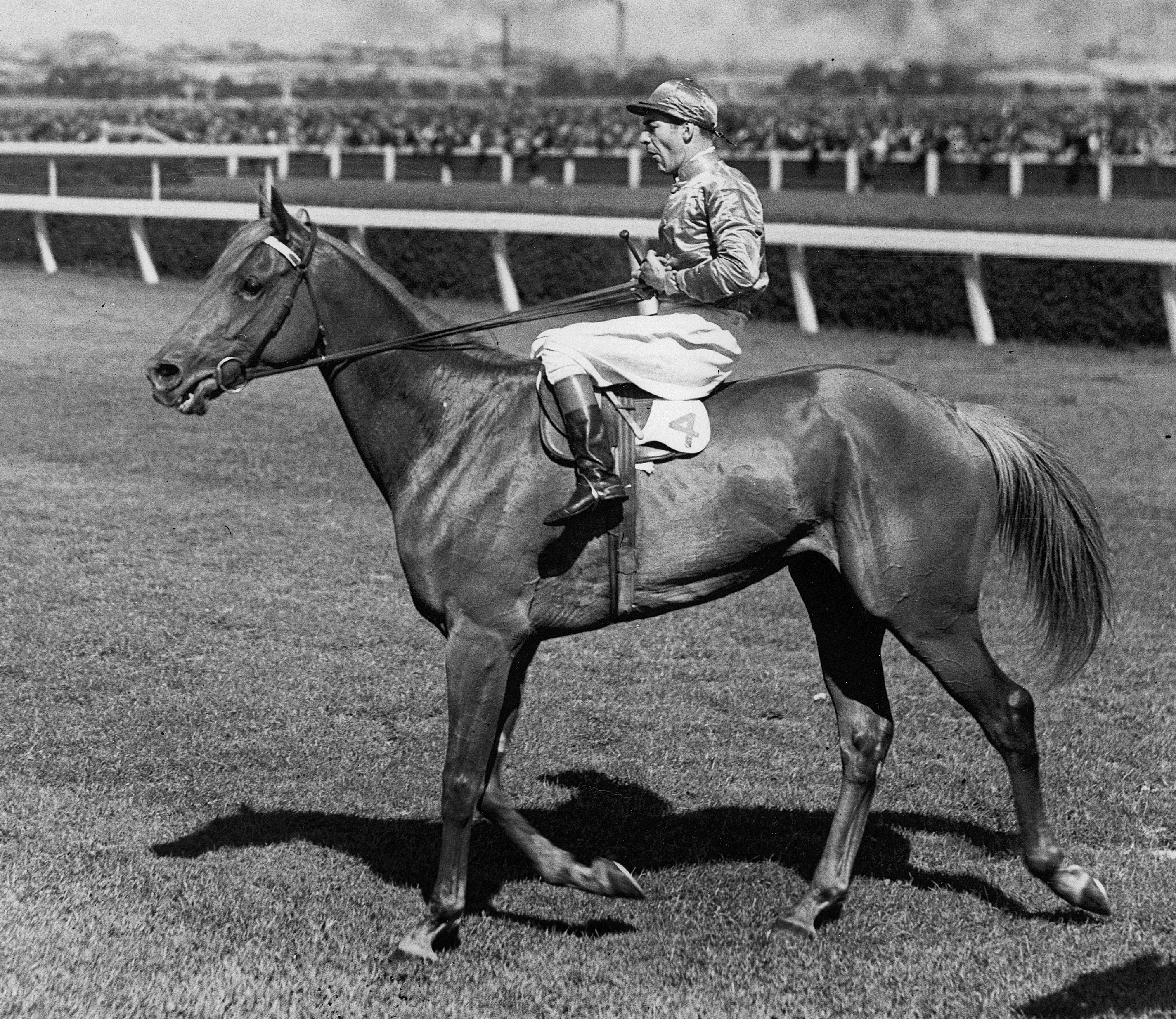
Peter Pan, 1932 & 1935 winner

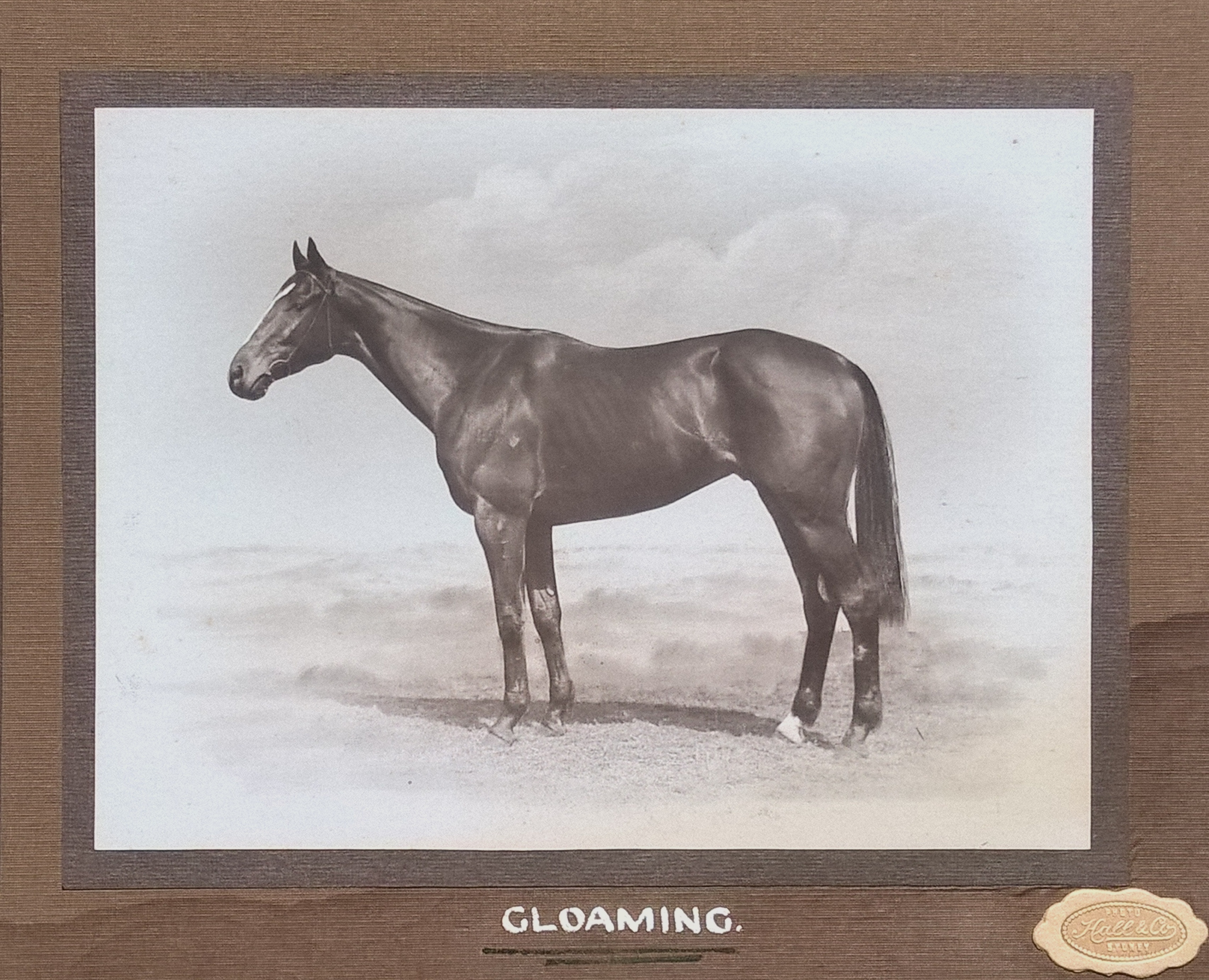
Gloaming, 1922 winner

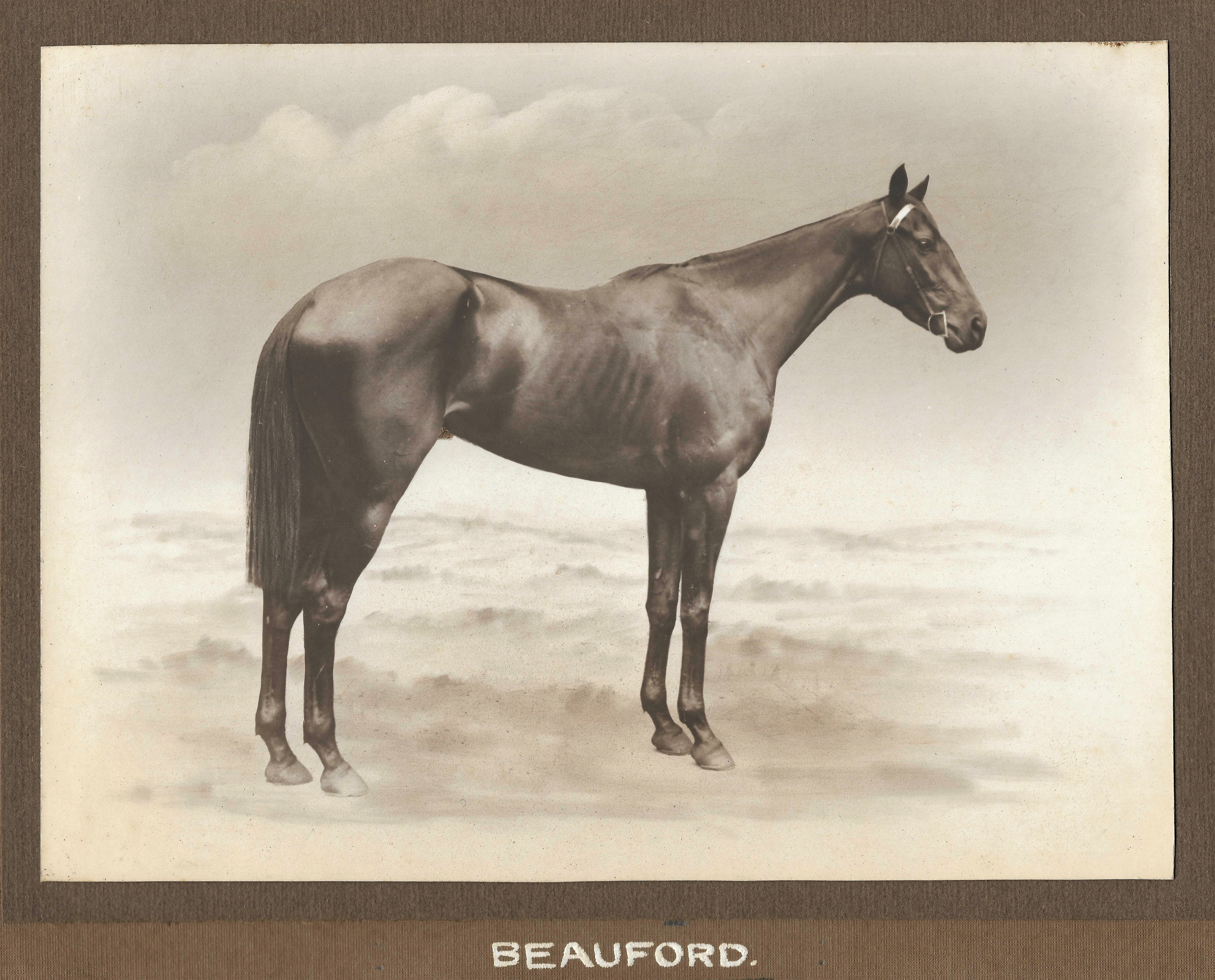
Beauford, 1921 winner

== History ==
=== Venue ===
- 1921–1990 - Rosehill Gardens Racecourse
- 1991 - Canterbury Park Racecourse
- 1991–2011 - Rosehill Gardens Racecourse
- 2012–2022 - Randwick Racecourse
- 2023–2026 - Rosehill Gardens Racecourse

=== Grade ===
- 1921–1978 - Principal Race
- 1979 onwards - Group 2

=== Distance ===
- 1921–1940 - 1 mile (~1600 metres)
- 1941–1971 - 8 1/2 furlongs (~1700 metres)
- 1972–1990 – 1750 metres
- 1991–2000 – 1900 metres
- 2001 – 1750 metres
- 2002–2010 – 1900 metres
- 2011–2016 – 2000 metres
- 2017 – 1800 metres
- 2018–2022 - 2000 metres
- 2023 onwards - 1900 metres

=== 1921 racebook ===
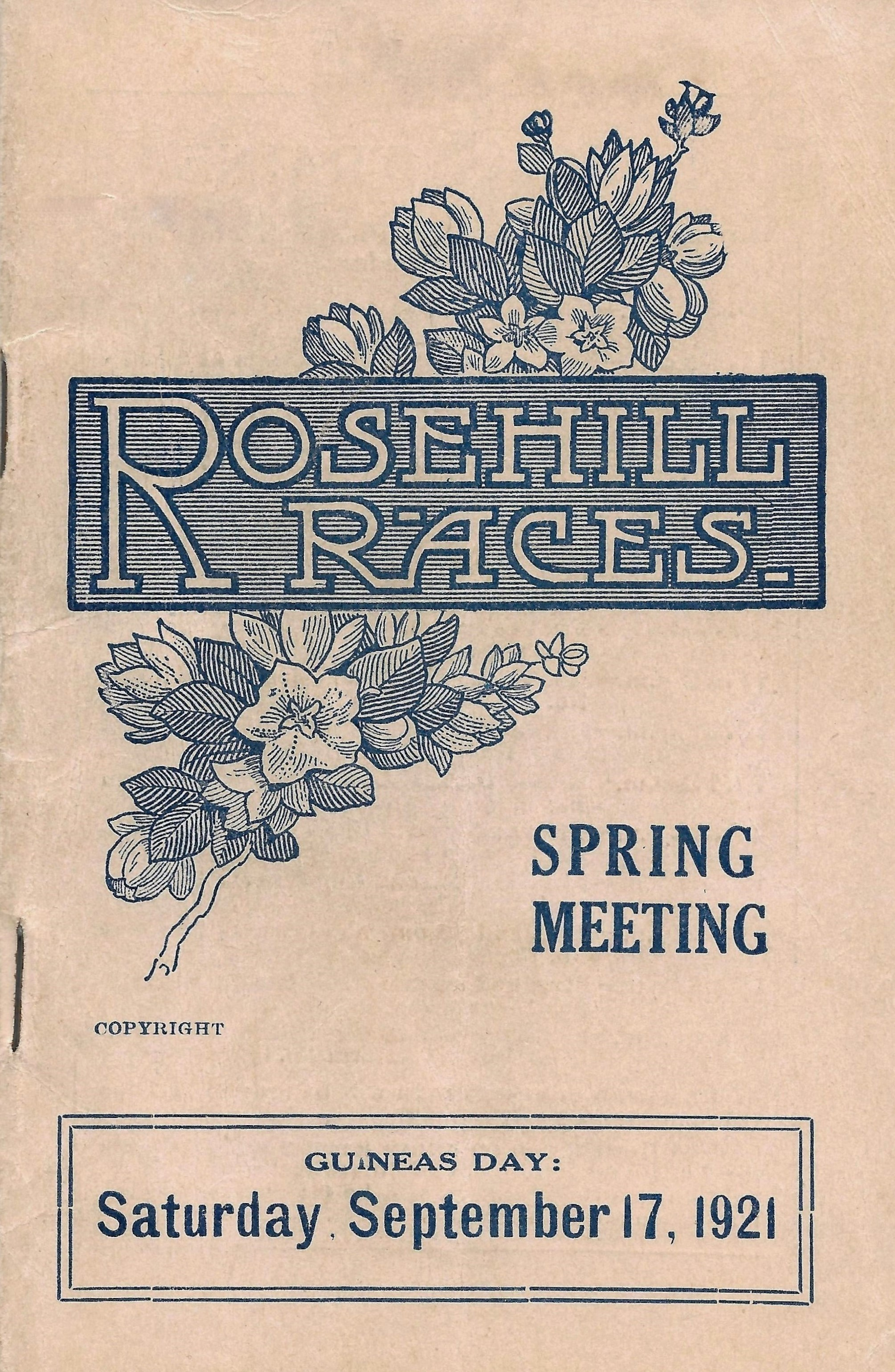
1921 RRC Hill Stakes racebook front cover

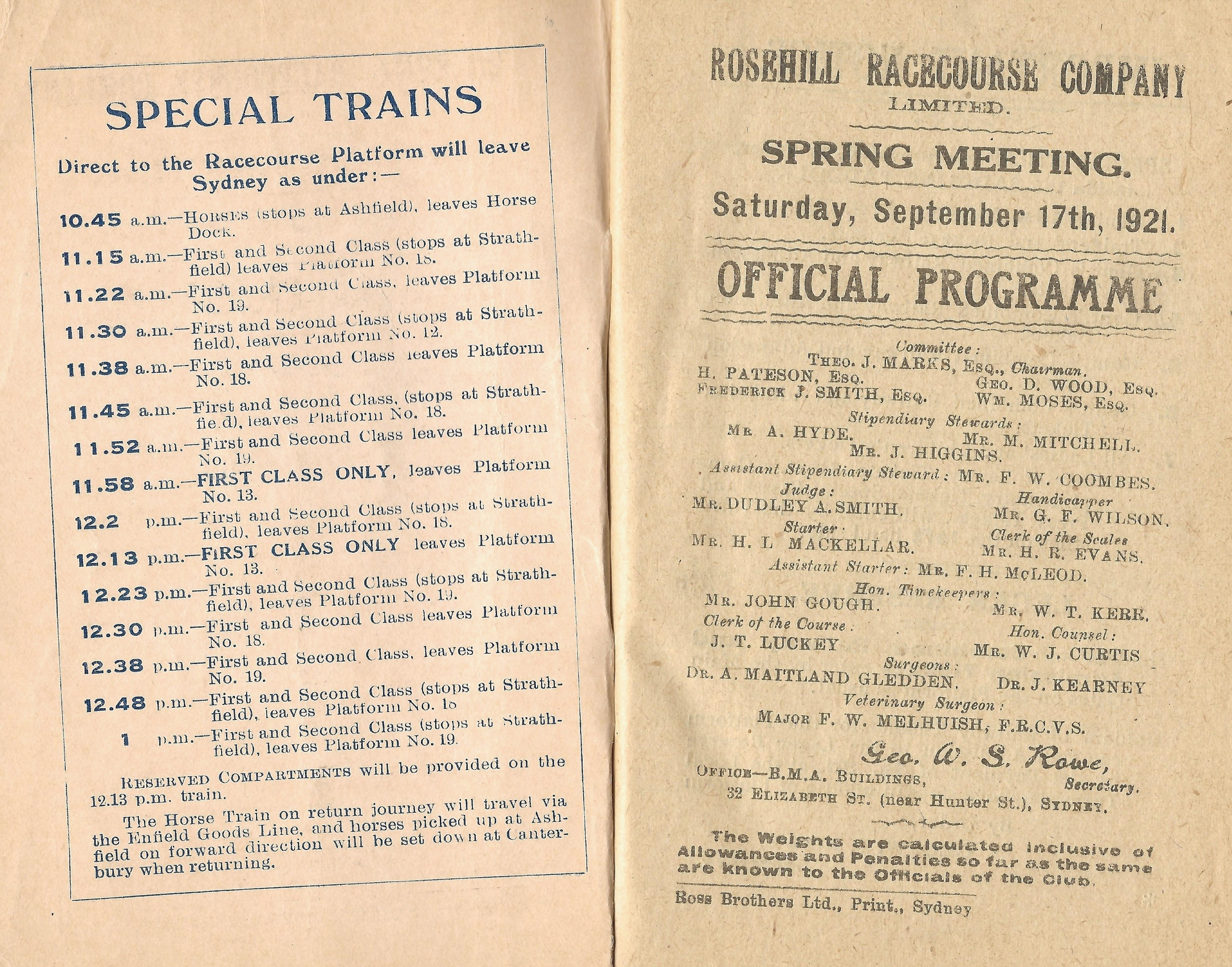
1921 RRC Hill Stakes Showing officials and raceday train timetable

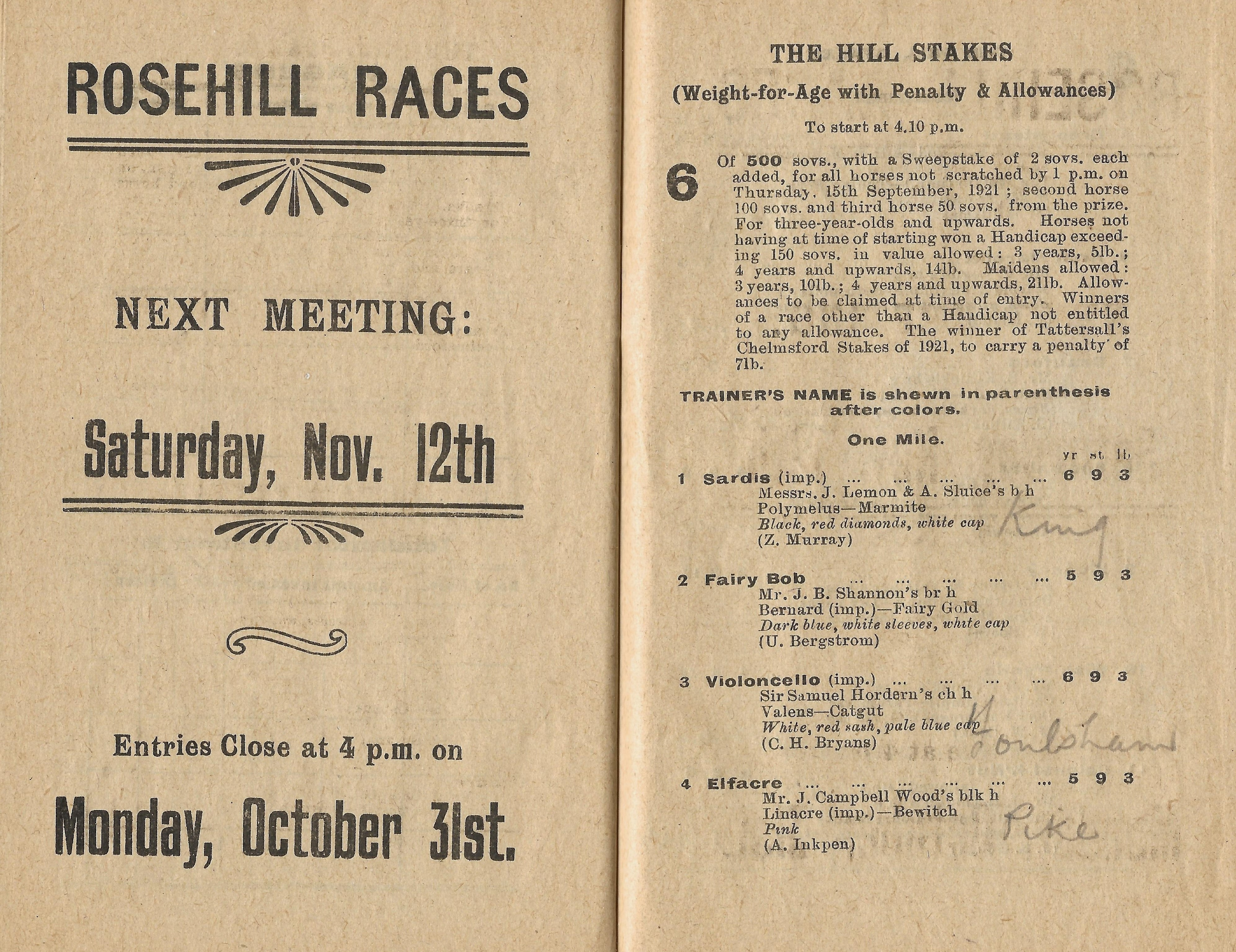
1921 RRC Hill Stakes starters and results

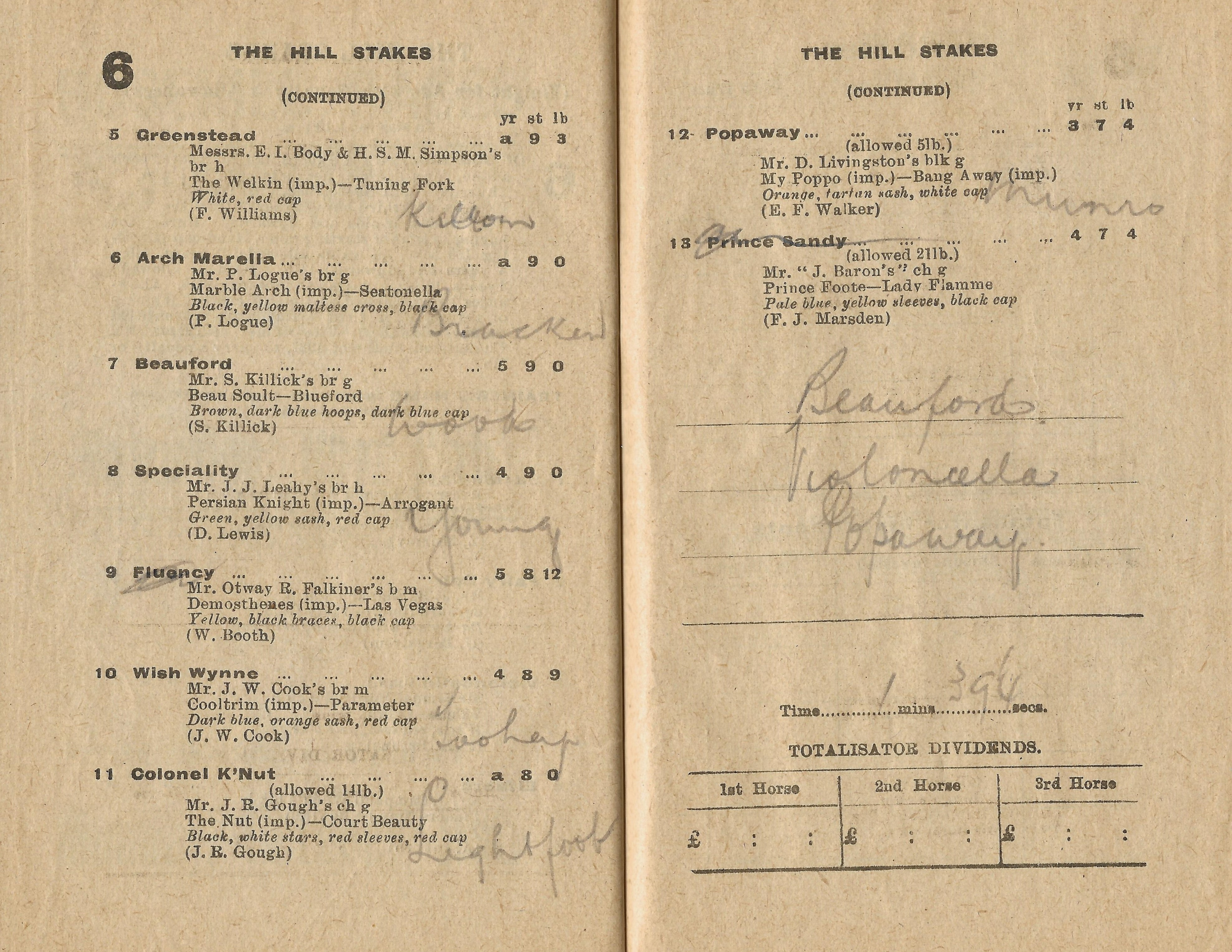
1921 RRC Hill Stakes showing the winner, Beauford

=== Gallery of noted winners ===
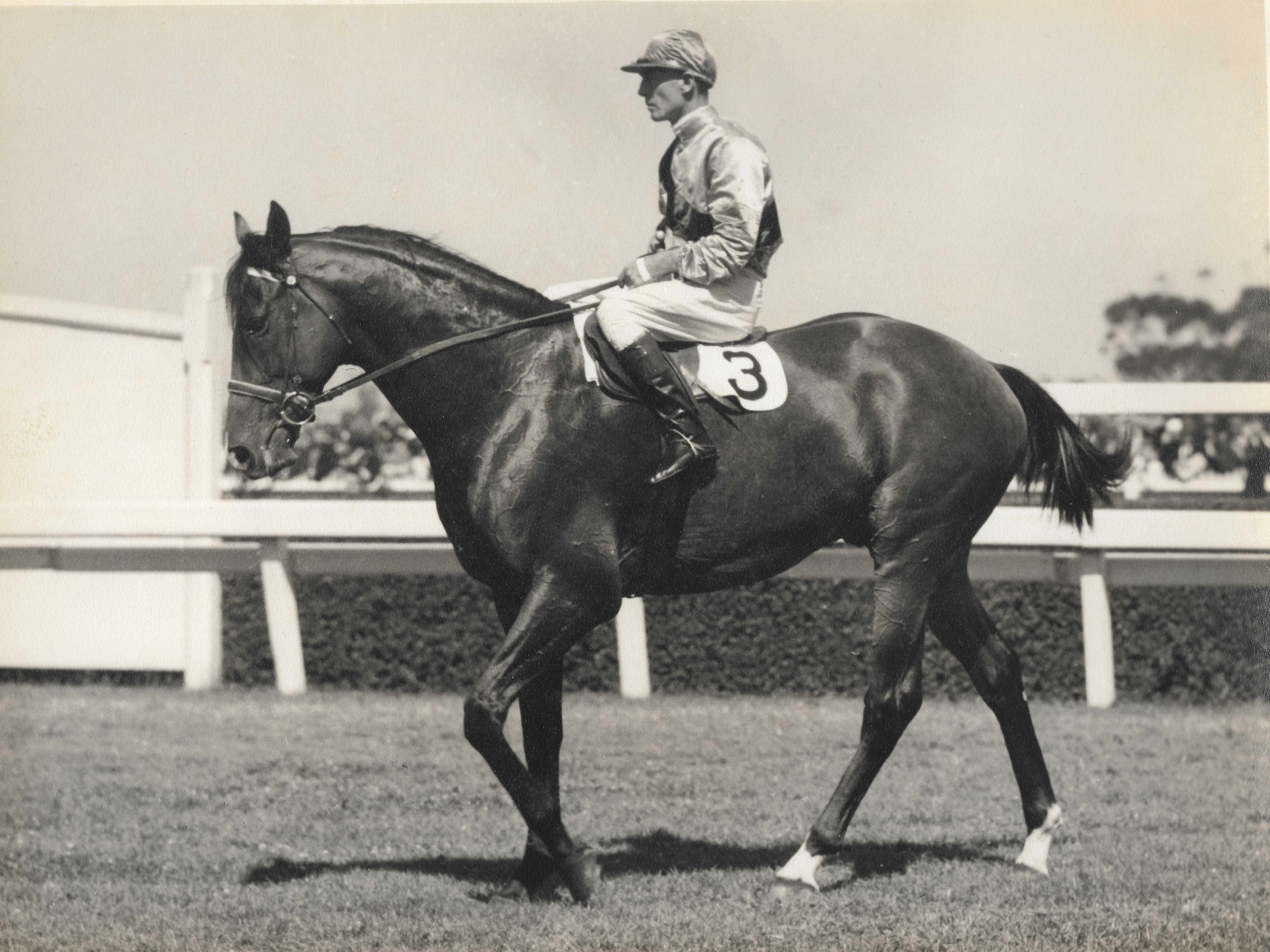
High Caste, 1941 winner

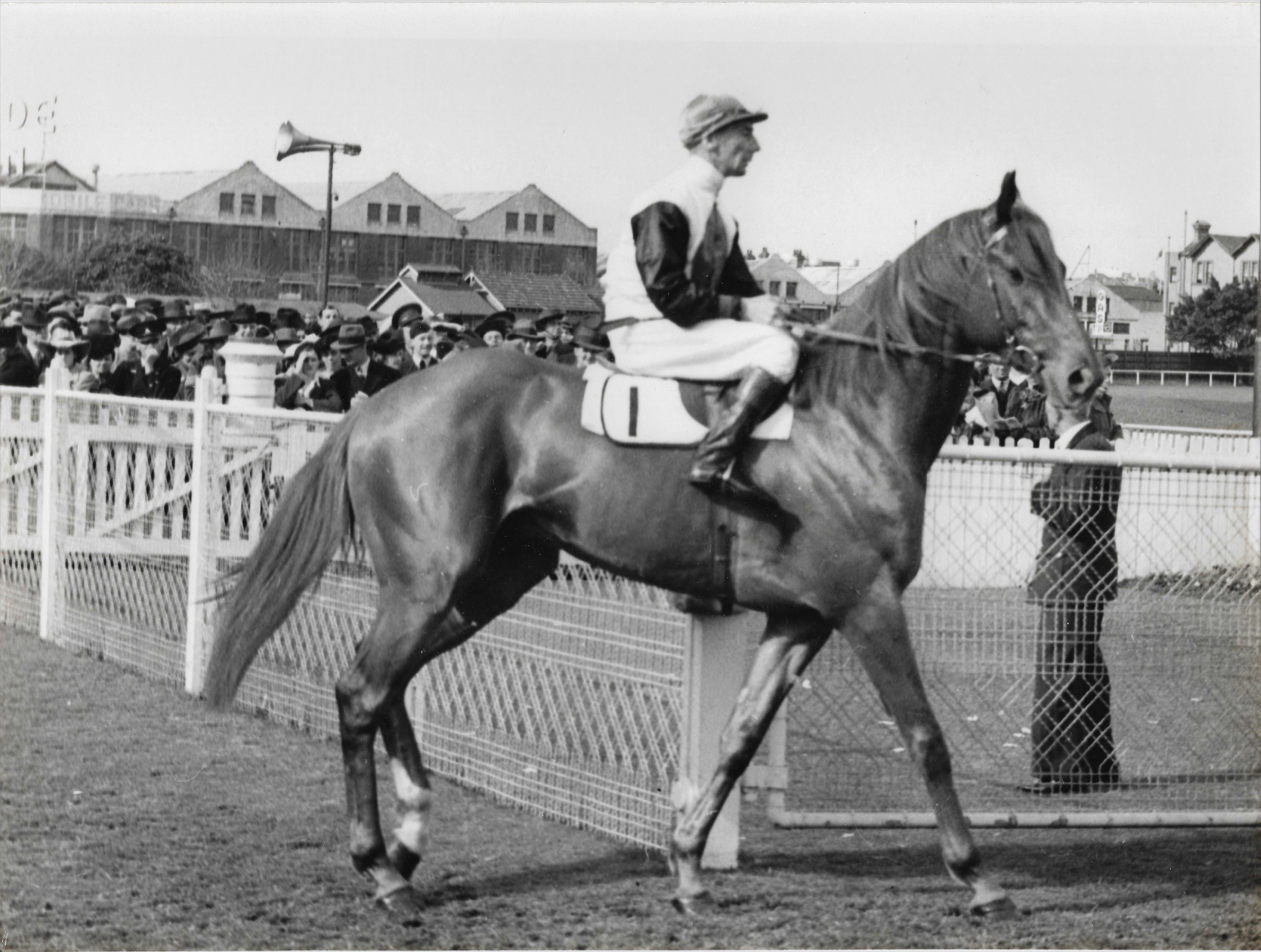
Yaralla, 1942 & 1943 winner

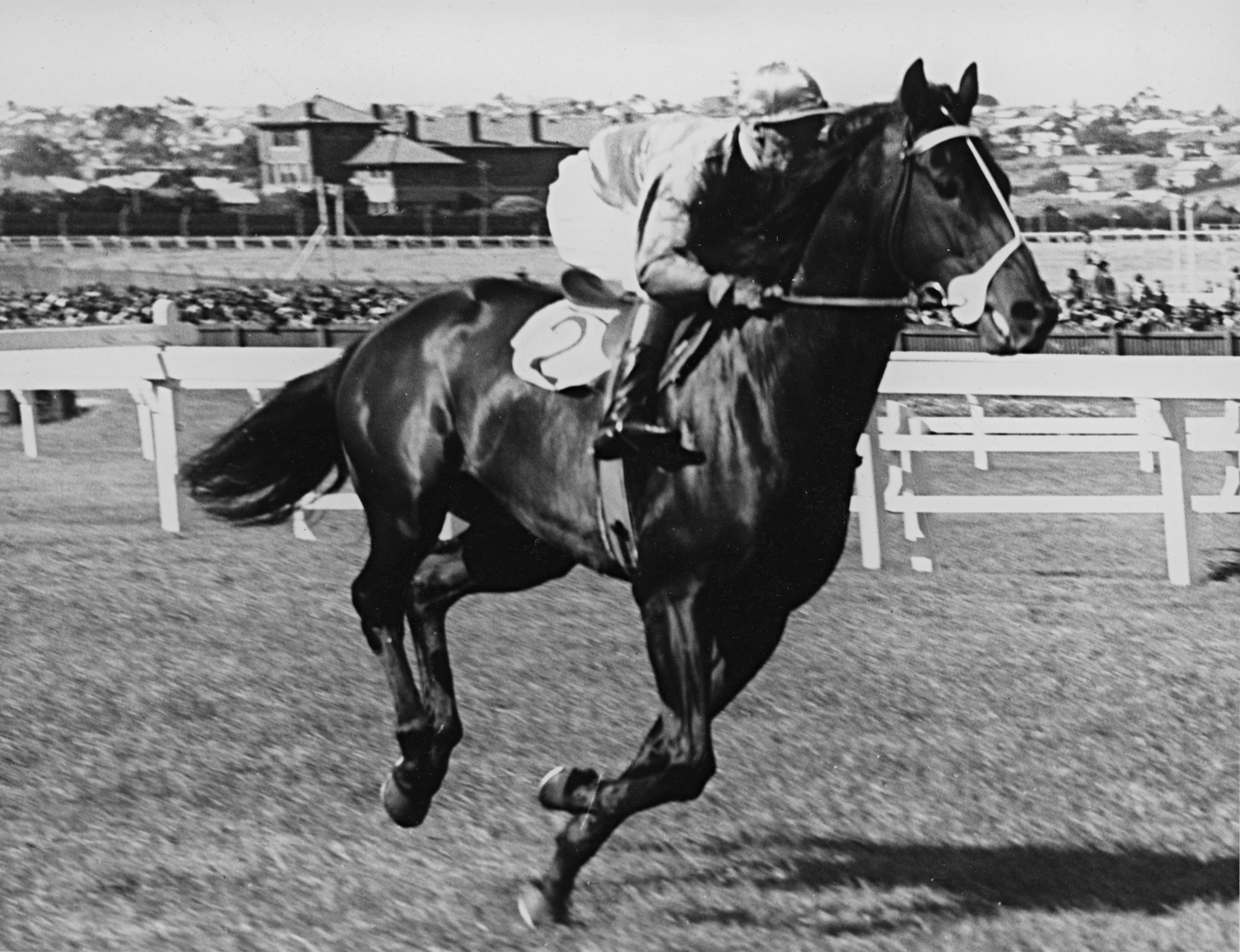
Beau Vite, 1940 winner

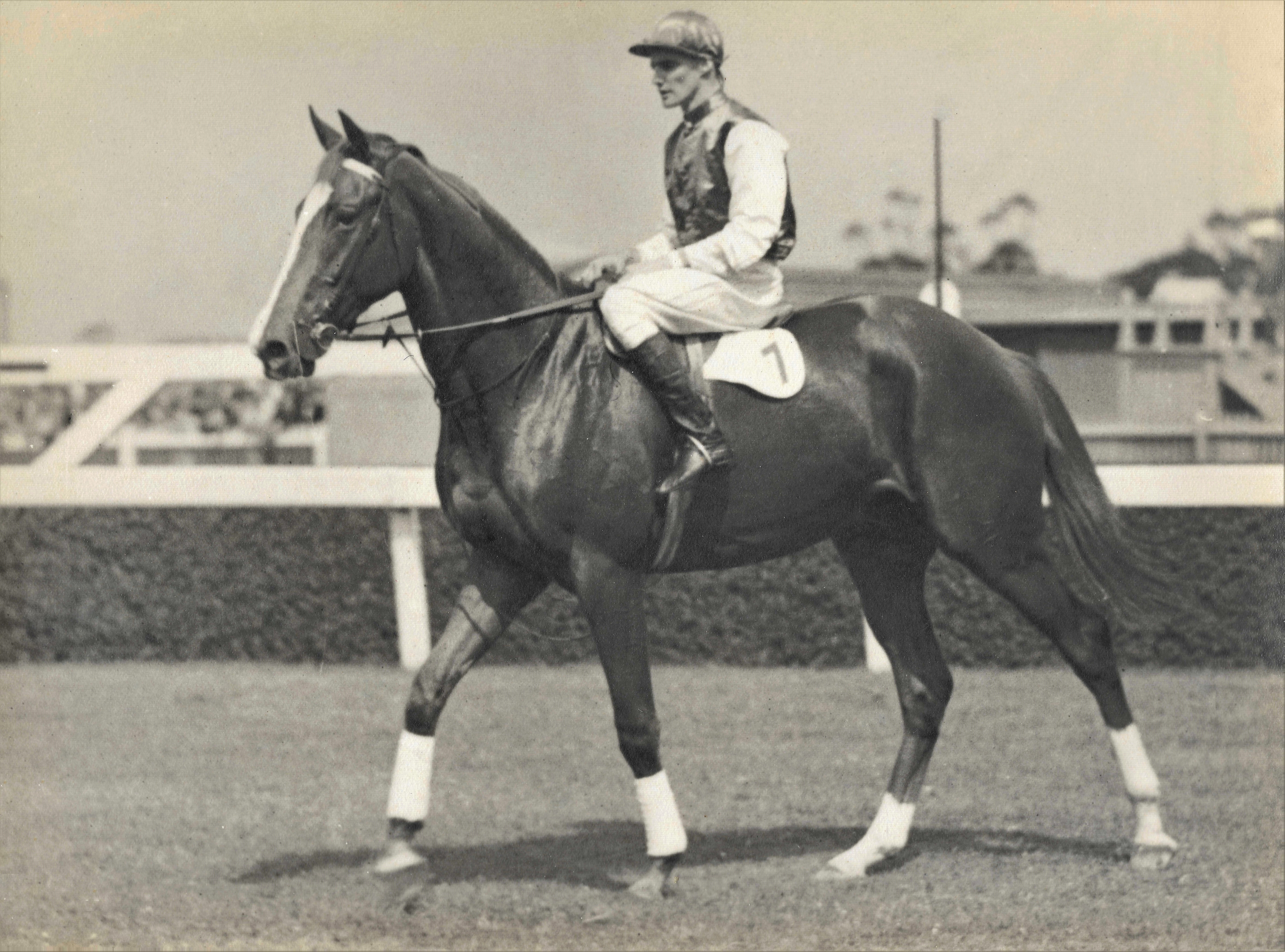
Gold Rod, 1938 & 1939 winner

== Winners ==
The following are past winners of the Hill Stakes.

- 2026 - Attrition
- 2025 - Lindermann
- 2024 - Attrition
- 2023 - Montefilia
- 2022 - Cascadian
- 2021 - Think It Over
- 2020 - Kolding
- 2019 - Verry Elleegant
- 2018 - Ace High
- 2017 - Classic Uniform
- 2016 - Hartnell
- 2015 - Preferment
- 2014 - Junoob
- 2013 - Moriarty
- 2012 - Lamasery
- 2011 - Trusting
- 2010 - Descarado
- 2009 - Miss Marielle
- 2008 - Fiumicino
- 2007 - †race not held
- 2006 - Desert War
- 2005 - Desert War
- 2004 - Natural Blitz
- 2003 - Excellerator
- 2002 - Dress Circle
- 2001 - Mulan Princess
- 2000 - Pasta Express
- 1999 - Tie The Knot
- 1998 - Arena
- 1997 - Ebony Grosve
- 1996 - Saintly
- 1995 - Stony Bay
- 1994 - Slight Chance
- 1993 - Silk Ali
- 1992 - Muirfield Village
- 1991 - Super Impose
- 1990 - Eastern Classic
- 1989 - Riverina Charm
- 1988 - Natural Habit
- 1987 - Beau Zam
- 1986 - Colour Page
- 1985 - Greatness
- 1984 - Trissaro
- 1983 - Emancipation
- 1982 - Cossack Prince
- 1981 - Canarthus
- 1980 - Silver Wraith
- 1979 - Imposing
- 1978 - Marceau
- 1977 - Carlaw
- 1976 - Ngawyni
- 1975 - Skyjack
- 1974 - Leica Lover
- 1973 - Grand Cidium
- 1972 - Gunsynd
- 1971 - Baguette
- 1970 - Flagrante
- 1969 - Black Onyx
- 1968 - Eternal Youth
- 1967 - Winfreux
- 1966 - Prince Grant
- 1965 - Eskimo Prince
- 1964 - Toi Port
- 1963 - Toi Port
- 1962 - Sky High
- 1961 - Lord Fury
- 1960 - Waipari
- 1959 - Noholme
- 1958 - Skyline
- 1957 - Redcraze
- 1956 - Redcraze
- 1955 - Somerset Fair
- 1954 - Prince Cortauld
- 1953 - Hydrogen
- 1952 - Hydrogen
- 1951 - San Domenico
- 1950 - Playboy
- 1949 - Vagabond
- 1948 - Dark Marne
- 1947 - Columnist
- 1946 - Bernborough
- 1945 - Shannon
- 1944 - Mayfowl
- 1943 - Yaralla
- 1942 - Yaralla
- 1941 - High Caste
- 1940 - Beau Vite
- 1939 - Gold Rod
- 1938 - Gold Rod
- 1937 - Talking
- 1936 - Silver Ring
- 1935 - Peter Pan
- 1934 - Chatham
- 1933 - Chatham
- 1932 - Peter Pan
- 1931 - Phar Lap
- 1930 - Phar Lap
- 1929 - Winalot
- 1928 - Limerick
- 1927 - Limerick
- 1926 - Valicare
- 1925 - The Hawk
- 1924 - Ballymena
- 1923 - The Hawk
- 1922 - Gloaming
- 1921 - Beauford

† Not held because of outbreak of equine influenza

== See also ==
- Alan Brown Stakes
- Gloaming Stakes
- Roman Consul Stakes
- The Nivison
- List of Australian Group races
- Group races
