= Testa Rossa (horse) =

Australian Thoroughbred racehorse

- Sire: Perugino (USA)
- Grandsire: Danzig (USA)
- Dam: Bo Dapper (Aus)
- Damsire: Sir Dapper (Aus)
- Sex: Stallion
- Foaled: 29 September 1996
- Country: Australia
- Colour: Bay
- Trainer: Dean Lawson
- Record: 28:13:3
- Earnings: A$ 3,034,203

Major wins
- Sires' Produce Stakes (VRC) (1999); Up and Coming Stakes (1999); Futurity Stakes (MRC) (2000); Lightning Stakes (2000); Invitation Stakes (1999 and 2000)

Awards
- 1999-2000 Australian Champion Sprinter

Testa Rossa (born 29 September 1996) is an Australian bred Thoroughbred racehorse that is notable for winning six Group One races and later becoming a stud stallion. He was named the Australian Champion Sprinter for the 1999-2000 season.

== Racing record ==
His major performances were:

- 7 November 1998 - 1st Maribyrnong Plate (Group 2) beating Real Jester and Walk the Wild Side.
- 13 March 1999 - 1st Sires' Produce Stakes (VRC) (Group 1), beating Dangerous and Downing Street
- 7 August 1999 - 1st San Domenico Stakes (Group 2) beating Easy Rocking and Catamarca
- 21 August 1999 - 1st Up and Coming Stakes (Group 2) beating Easy Rocking and Align
- 19 September 1999 - 1st Vic Health Cup (Group 1) beating Nina Haraka and Redoute's Choice
- 4 March 2000 - 1st Futurity Stakes (MRC) (Group 1) beating Miss Pennymoney and Redoute's Choice
- 13 February 2000 - 1st Lightning Stakes (Group 1) beating Falvelon and Magic Music
- 7 September 2000 - 1st Ian McEwen Trophy (Listed) beating Sports and Chattanooga
- 23 September 2000 - 1st Vic Health Cup (Group 1) beating Camarena and Porto Roca
- 11 November 2000 - 1st Emirates Stakes (Group 1) beating Weasel Will and Crawl.

He won races over the distances of 900m to 1600m.

== Stud record ==
When Testa Rossa retired from racing he stood at Vinery Stud in the Hunter Valley, New South Wales.

He is the sire of:

- Enzo's Lad (Sheerama, by Catbird), winner of the Group One Telegraph Handicap in 2018 and 2019
- Herat Testa (Graciela, by Flying Spur), winner of the 2015 Southern Cross Stakes (G3 1200m)
- Ostensia (Aerate’s Pick, by Picknicker), winner of Group One races in three different countries.
- Testafiable (Jamelden Echo by Prince Echo), winner of the 2005 Carbine Club Stakes (VRC) and 2006 South Australian Derby

Testa Rossa is the dam sire of Vow and Declare (Declaration of War – Geblitz), winner of the 2019 Melbourne Cup. This made him the first Australian-bred broodmare sire of a Melbourne Cup winner since 1981.

He retired from stud duties in 2019.

== Testa Rossa Stakes ==
In his honour a listed race is held at Caulfield.
