= Marscay =

Australian-bred Thoroughbred racehorse

- Sire: Biscay (AUS)
- Grandsire: Star Kingdom (IRE)
- Dam: Heart of Market (USA)
- Damsire: To Market (USA)
- Sex: Stallion
- Foaled: 20 October 1979
- Died: 13 May 2000 (aged 20)
- Country: Australia
- Colour: Chestnut
- Breeder: Derby-King Ranch
- Owner: G & B White
- Trainer: Jack Denham
- Record: 15-8:2:1
- Earnings: $236,340

Major wins
- Golden Slipper (1982); Up and Coming Stakes (1982); Hobartville Stakes (1983)
- Last updated on 23 October 2018

Marscay was a champion Australian Thoroughbred sire and racehorse.

Bred at Woodlands Stud near Denman in the Hunter Valley in 1979 he was sired by Biscay and his dam Heart of Market was by To Market. Marscay was owned by Geoff and Beryl White and trained by successful Sydney trainer Jack Denham.

== Racing career ==
As a two-year-old Marscay won the richest sprint race in Australia, the 1982 Golden Slipper, Group One, over 1200 metres at Rosehill Racecourse. He was also placed in the Group 1 AJC Sires Produce Stakes over 1400 metres at Randwick Racecourse and in the Group 3 Todman Slipper Trial.

As a three-year-old Marscay won the Group 2 Hobartville Stakes defeating champion Strawberry Road. He also won the Group 3 Up and Coming Stakes and was placed in the Royal Sovereign Stakes. He was retired in 1983. Marscay won 8 races from 15 starts for prizemoney of $233,840.

== Breeding career ==
Marscay stood at Widden Stud in the Hunter Valley. As a sire Marscay produced 62 stakes winners. He sired Group One winners including the 1993 Golden Slipper winner Bint Marscay, AJC Oaks winners Triscay and Circles of Gold, AJC Galaxy winner Jetball and multiple Group 1 winner March Hare.

Marscay was the champion Australian sire in 1990–91 and 1992–93 and champion Australian Broodmare sire four times. Marscay died at Widden Stud on 13 May 2000.

Marscay is the damsire of Elvstroem, winner of the 2003 Victoria Derby, 2004 Caulfield Cup, 2005 Underwood Stakes, C F Orr Stakes and Dubai Duty Free Stakes at Nad Al Sheba Racecourse in Dubai.
