= Up and Coming Stakes =

Australian horse race

- Class: Group 3
- Location: Rosehill Racecourse, Sydney, Australia
- Inaugurated: 1979
- Race type: Thoroughbred
- Sponsor: Canterbury Hurlstone Park RSL (2025 & 2026)

Race information
- Distance: 1,300 metres
- Surface: Turf
- Track: Right-handed
- Qualification: Three year old colts and geldings
- Weight: Quality handicap
- Purse: $250,000 (2026)

The Up and Coming Stakes is an Australian Turf Club Group 3 Thoroughbred horse race for three-year-old colts and geldings, run as a quality handicap over a distance of 1300 metres in Sydney, Australia in August.

== History ==
The race is considered a good start to returning to racing in the new racing calendar for talented three-year-olds gearing up for an Australian spring campaign. It is often won by a three-year-old, as evidenced by the honour roll of past winners who went on to become stars on the track and/or stud such as:

- Exceed and Excel - Australian Champion Sprinter (2003/04) and Australian Champion Sire (2012/13)
- Fastnet Rock - Australian Champion Sprinter (2004/05), Australian Champion Three Year Old Colt/Gelding (2004/05), Australian Champion Stallion (2011/12 & 2014/15)
- General Nediym
- Marscay - Australian Champion sire in 1990–91 and 1992–93
- Mahogany - Australian Champion Three Year Old (1993-1994), Australian Horse of the Year(1993-1994)
- Snitzel - Australian Champion Sire (2016, 2017, 2018, 2019)
- Testa Rossa - Australian Champion Sprinter (1999-2000).

=== Name ===
The race is named in honour of the 1959 Warwick Stakes and Canterbury Stakes winner Up And Coming.

=== Distance ===
- 1980–1988 – 1200 metres
- 1989 – 1160 metres
- 1990–2010 – 1200 metres
- 2011 onwards - 1300 metres

=== Grade ===
- 1979 - Listed race
- 1980–1992 - Group 3
- 1993–2004 - Group 2
- 2005–2012 - Group 3
- 2013 - Group 2
- 2014 onwards - Group 3

=== Venue ===
- 1979–1992 - Warwick Farm Racecourse
- 1993–1996 - Randwick Racecourse
- 1997–1999 - Warwick Farm Racecourse
- 2000 - Canterbury Park Racecourse
- 2001–2004 - Warwick Farm Racecourse
- 2005–2006 - Randwick Racecourse
- 2008 - Warwick Farm Racecourse
- 2009 - Randwick Racecourse
- 2010–2013 - Warwick Farm Racecourse
- 2014–2020 - Randwick Racecourse
- 2021 - Kembla Grange Racecourse
- 2022 onwards - Rosehill Racecourse

== Winners ==
The following are past winners of the race.

- 2026 - Plagiarism
- 2025 - Grand Prairie
- 2024 - Autumn Glow
- 2023 - Tom Kitten
- 2022 - Kibou
- 2021 - Tiger Of Malay
- 2020 - North Pacific
- 2019 - True Detective
- 2018 - Master Ash
- 2017 - Dracarys
- 2016 - Divine Prophet
- 2015 - Shards
- 2014 - Scissor Kick
- 2013 - War
- 2012 - Albrecht
- 2011 - Manawanui
- 2010 - Blackball
- 2009 - Rarefied
- 2008 - Dreamscape
- 2007 - †race not held
- 2006 - Court Command
- 2005 - Snitzel
- 2004 - Fastnet Rock
- 2003 - Exceed And Excel
- 2002 - Snowland
- 2001 - Newquay
- 2000 - Zariz
- 1999 - Testa Rossa
- 1998 - Paris Dream
- 1997 - General Nediym
- 1996 - Paint
- 1995 - Our Maizcay
- 1994 - Bulldog Yeats
- 1993 - Mahogany
- 1992 - West End
- 1991 - Kinjite
- 1990 - The Bullfighter
- 1989 - Patronise
- 1988 - Star Watch
- 1987 - Sky Chase
- 1986 - Broad Reach
- 1985 - Timothy
- 1984 - Royal Troubador
- 1983 - Sir Dapper
- 1982 - Marscay
- 1981 - Best Western
- 1980 - John's Hero
- 1979 - Spear

† The 2007 event was not held because of outbreak of equine influenza

== See also ==
- San Domenico Stakes
- List of Australian Group races
- Group races
