= San Domenico (horse) =

Australian thoroughbred gelding

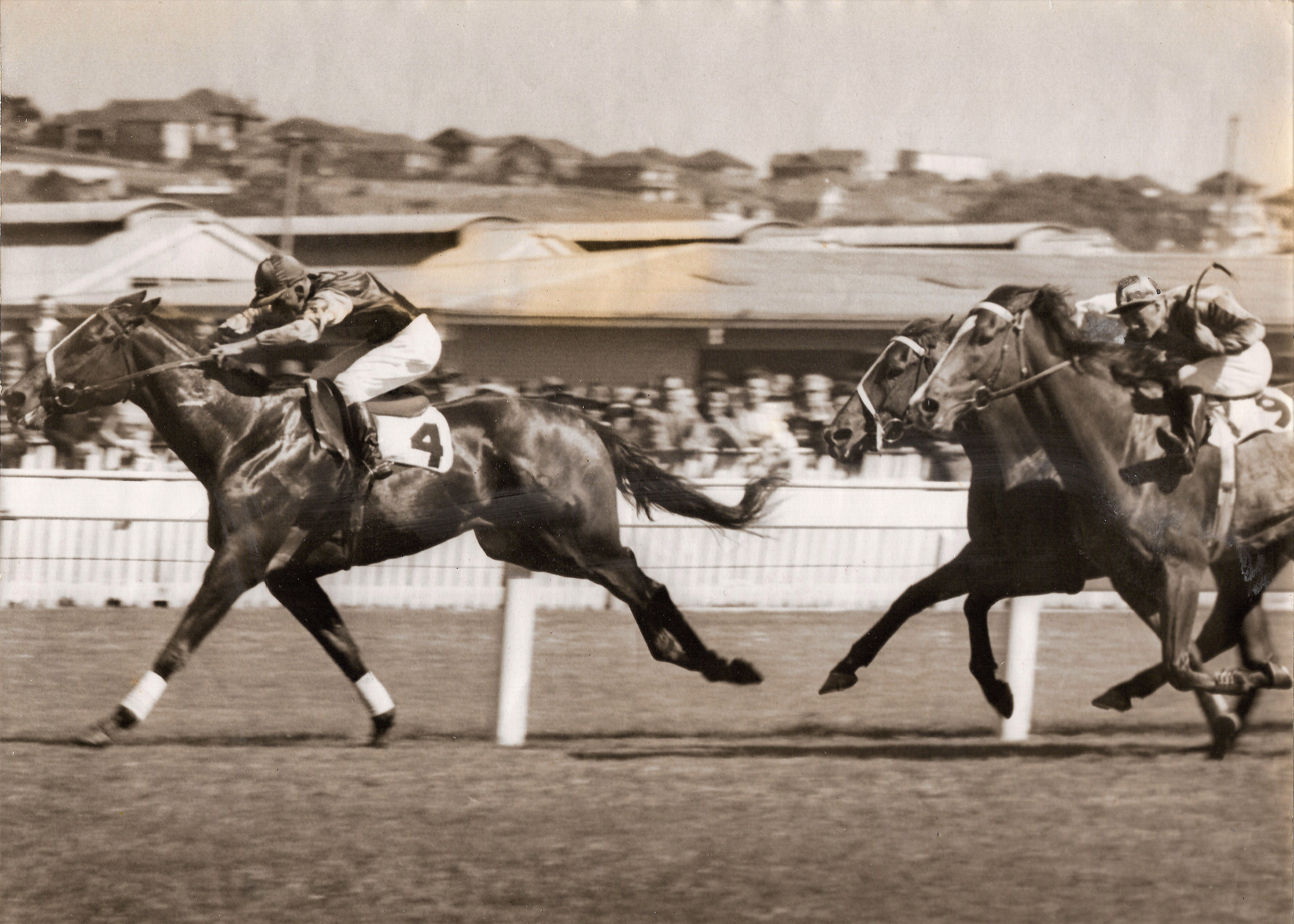
- San Domenico & Arthur Ward
- Sire: Hua (AUS)
- Grandsire: Heroic (AUS)
- Dam: Arpina (GB)
- Damsire: Ksar (FR)
- Sex: Gelding
- Foaled: 1945
- Country: Australia
- Colour: Brown
- Breeder: Danmark Pty Ltd N.S.W
- Owner: R.P. Formosa; G. Goodwin
- Trainer: N.R.O’Brien; R.P. Formosa; W.J. Kearns
- Record: 79: 25,10, 8
- Earnings: £30,839

Major wins
- Hobartville Stakes (1948); C.W.Cropper Handicap (1949); Challenge Stakes (1949, 1950); Oakleigh Plate (1949); Frederick Clissold Handicap (1950); George Main Stakes (1950); Warwick Stakes (1950, 1951); Canterbury Stakes (1950, 1951); Hill Stakes (1951); C.M.Lloyd Stakes (1951); Futurity Stakes (1952); All Aged Stakes (1952)

Honours
- San Domenico Stakes

San Domenico was a brown Australian thoroughbred gelding who raced for 7 seasons from a two-year-old to an eight-year-old recording 25 wins from 5 furlongs to 1 mile and regular jockey Arthur Ward 2007 Australian Racing Hall of Fame inductee winning 14 races.

== Breeding ==
San Domenico was bred by glass industrialist W.J. ‘Knockout’ Smith at St Aubin's Stud Scone. Sire Hua (AUS) won the 1937 VRC Derby, 1938 MVRC William Reid Stakes and 1938 VRC St Leger. Grandsire and champion Heroic was the leading sire in Australia between 1933 and 1939. Dam Arpina (GB) was lightly raced and won a Mornington Maiden Plate.

== Racing career ==
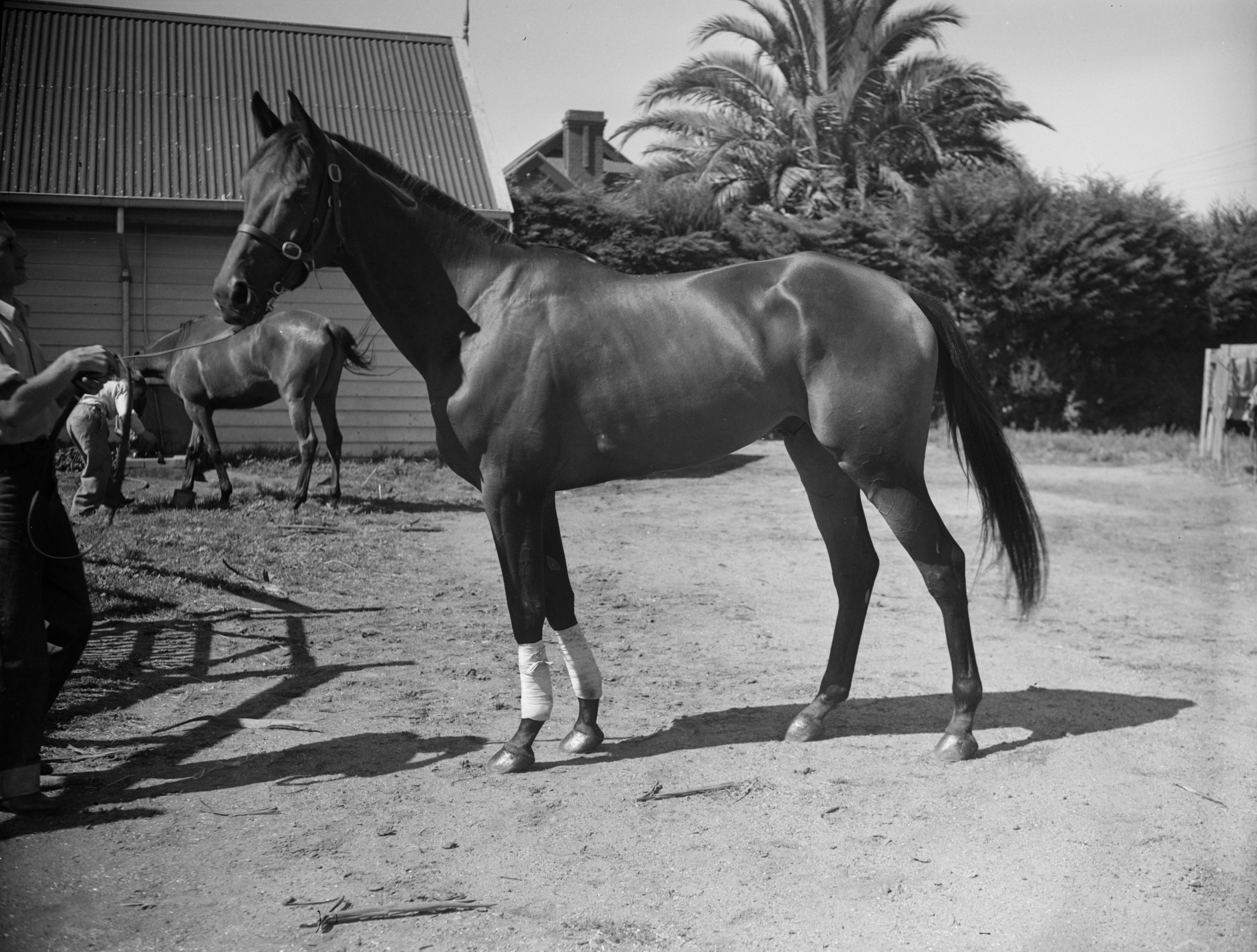
San Domenico, 1950

San Domenico raced in the post war years between 1948 and 1954 a specialist weight carrying sprinter and the winner of 8 Group 1 races in the modern era including the 1949 VATC Oakleigh Plate,1950 AJC George Main Stakes, 1952 AJC All Aged Stakes and the 1952 VATC Futurity Stakes carrying 65.5 kg defeating Grey Boots 1950 AJC Doncaster Handicap and 1950 VATC Caulfield Cup.

Ray Formosa owner-trainer and arrant tax defaulter from Kogarah, Sydney purchased San Domenico for 1,000 guineas and refused an offer of 4,000 guineas from breeder W.J.Smith prior to San Domenico racing and 8,000 guineas from other sources after his first win at Randwick. Formosa was granted a training licence in 1948 after the Hobartville Stakes win and original trainer N.R.O'Brien becoming stable foreman. In 1949 Formosa purchased the Moorefield Sydney stables of the late Jack Cush major winners being Journal 1934 VATC Caulfield Cup, Reading 1939 AJC Derby, VRC Victoria Derby, 1940 AJC St Leger and VRC St Leger. San Domenico was later sold in 1951 for 3,500 guineas to wealthy Wilcannia grazier George Goodwin and then trained by W.J Kearns

San Domenico's racing record: 79 starts for 25 wins, 10 seconds, 8 thirds

== 1949 racebooks ==
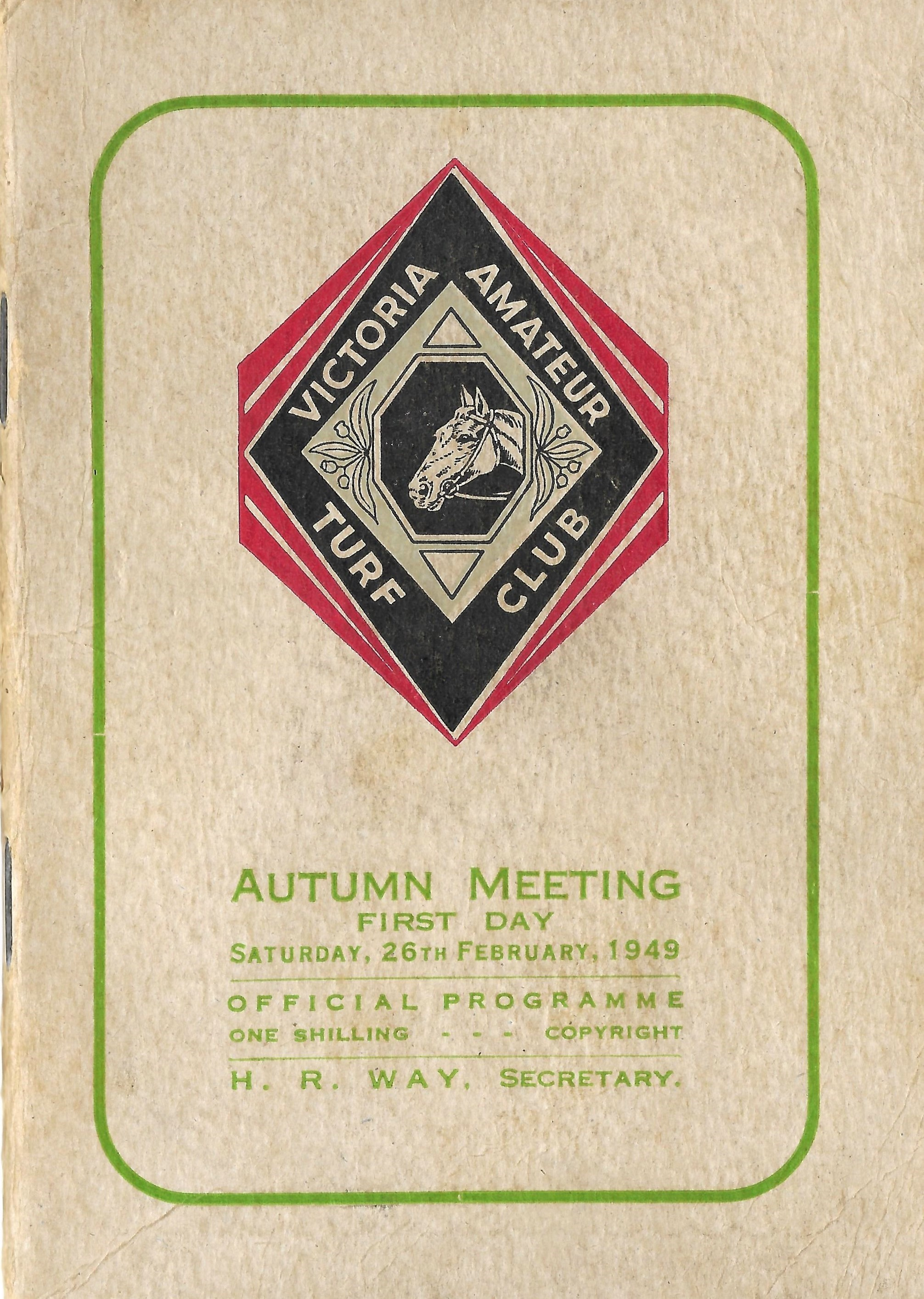
1949 VATC Oakleigh Plate racebook front cover

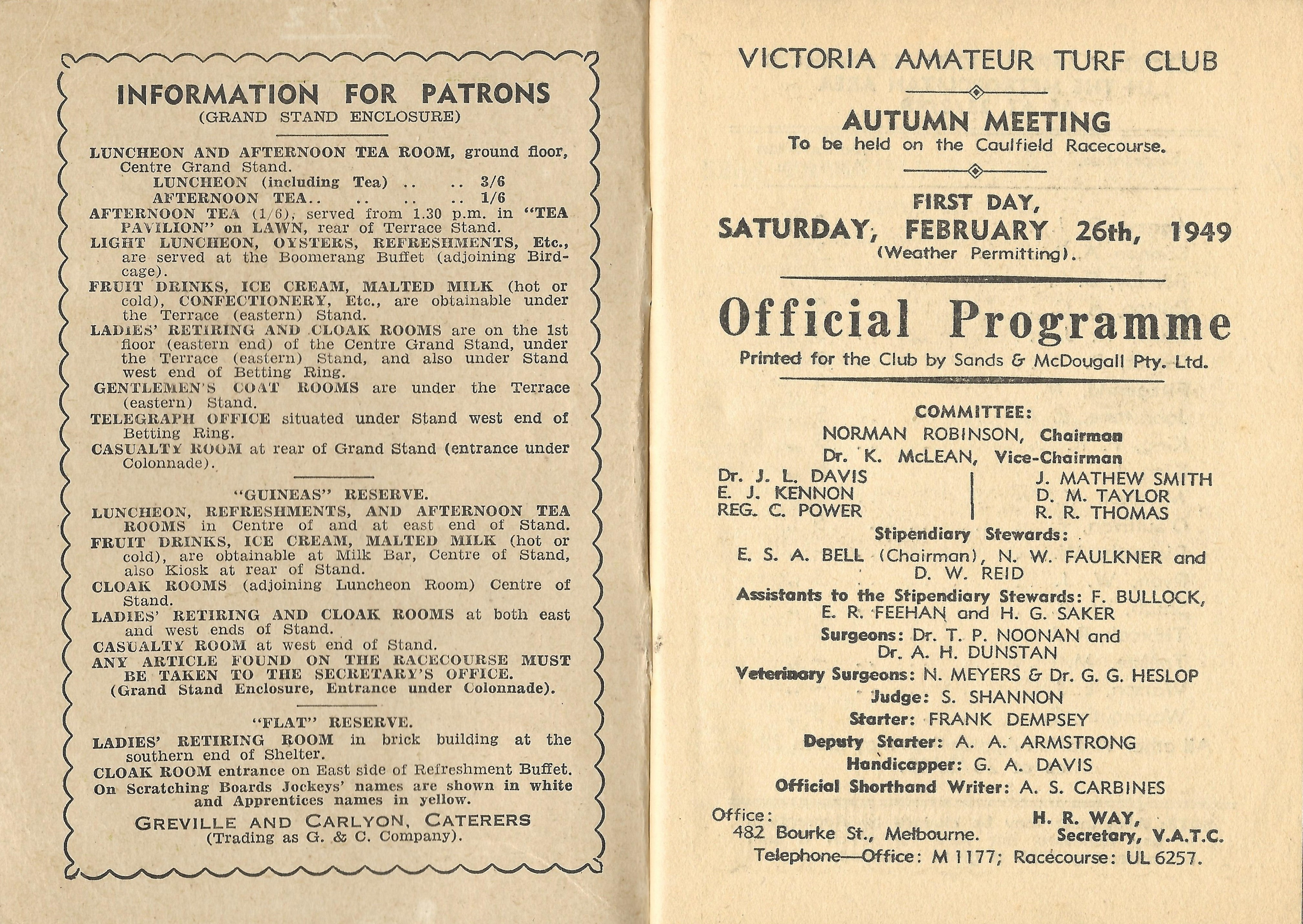
1949 VATC Oakleigh Plate showing raceday officials

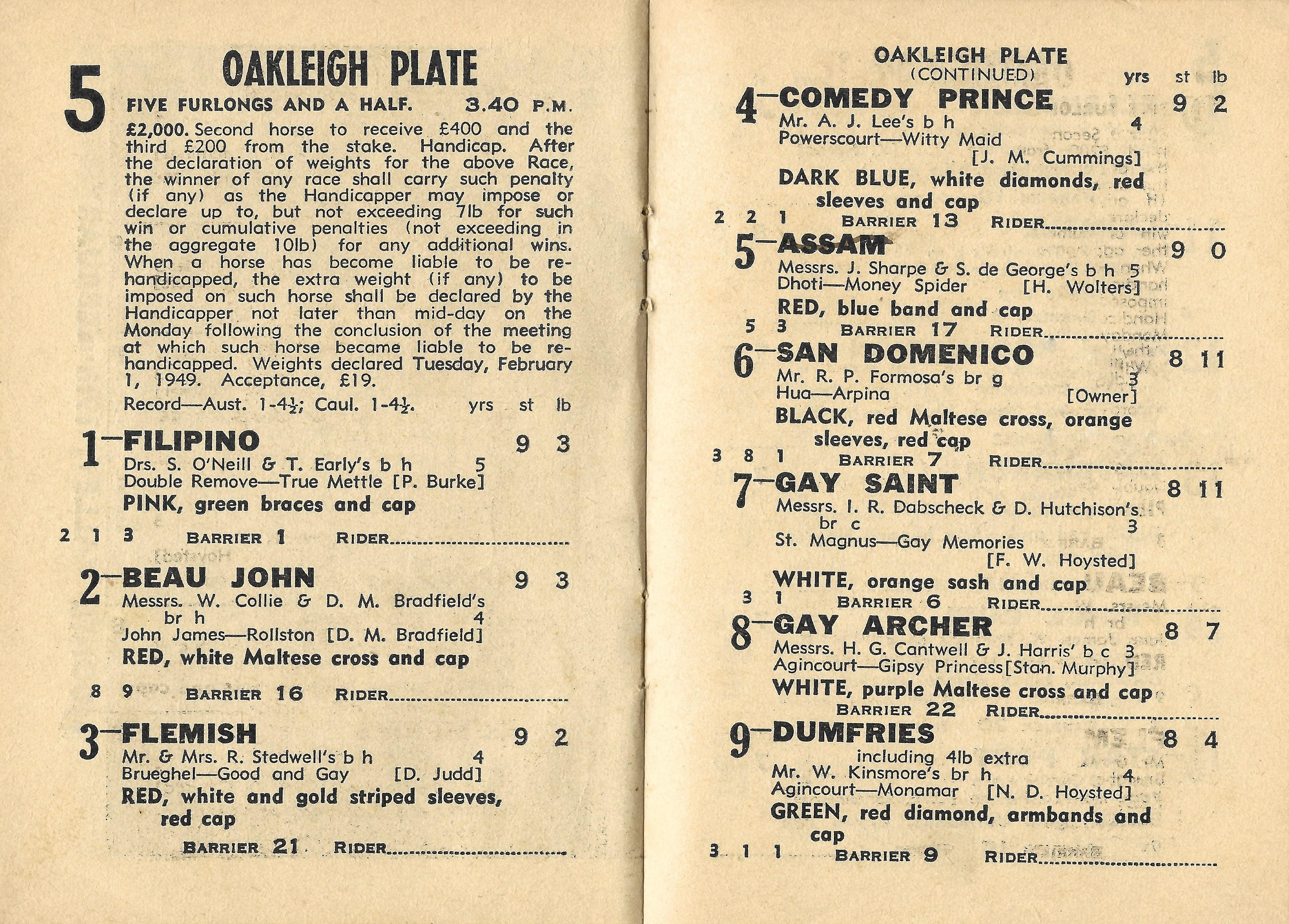
1949 VATC Oakleigh Plate showing the winner, San Domenico

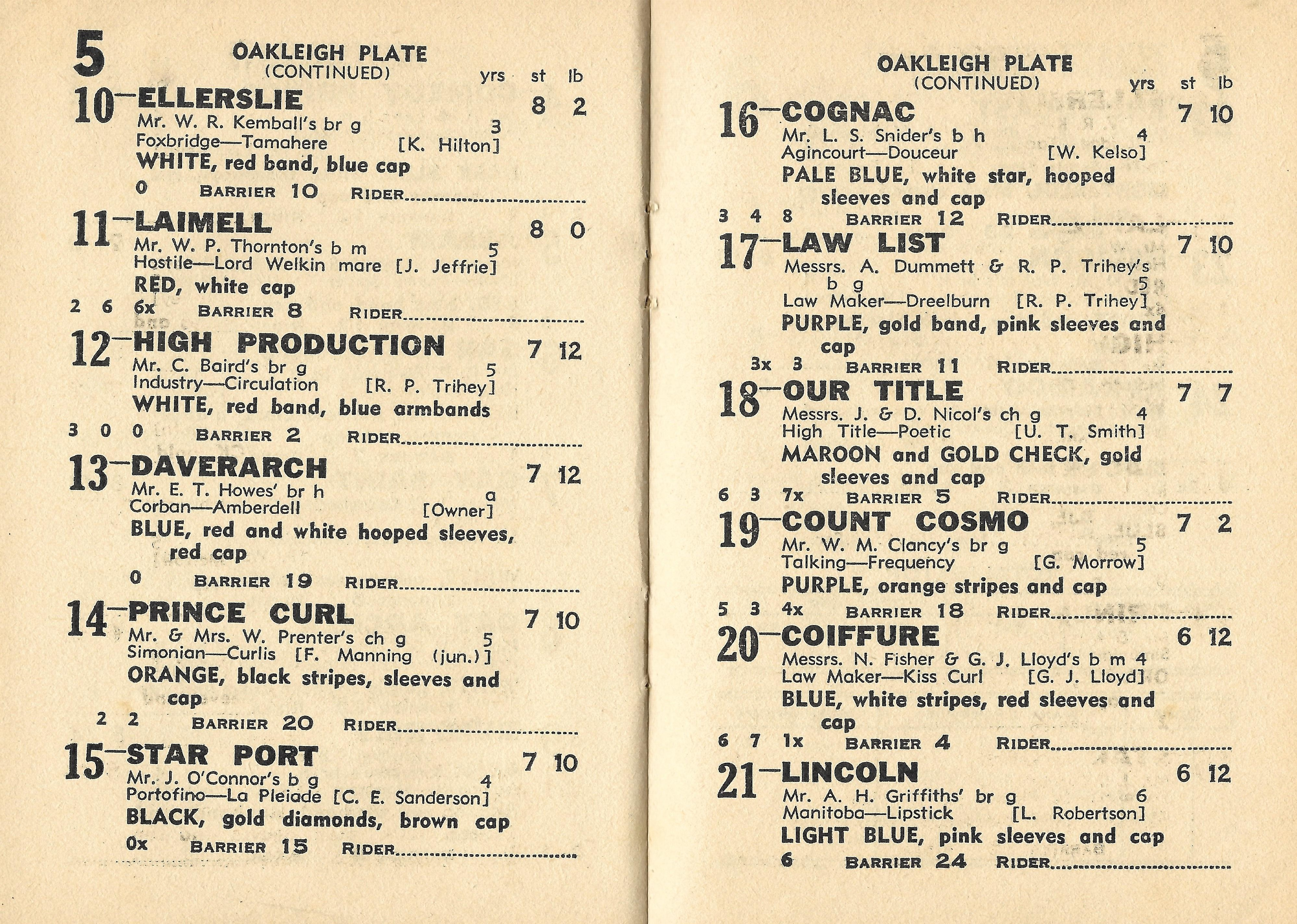
1949 VATC Oakleigh Plate starters and results

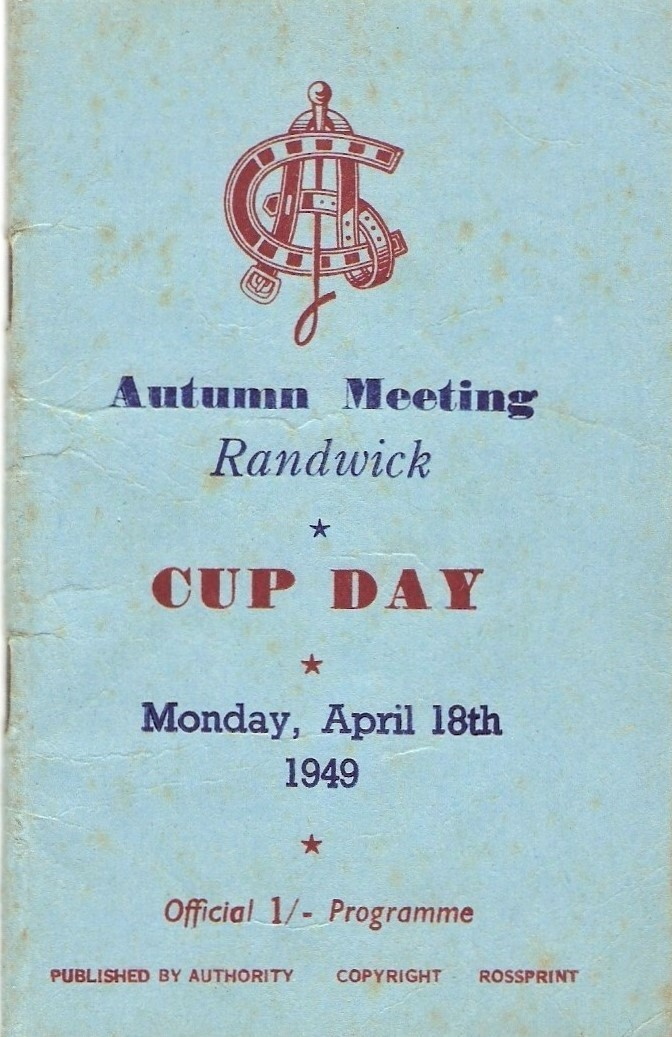
1949 AJC Sydney Cup racebook front cover

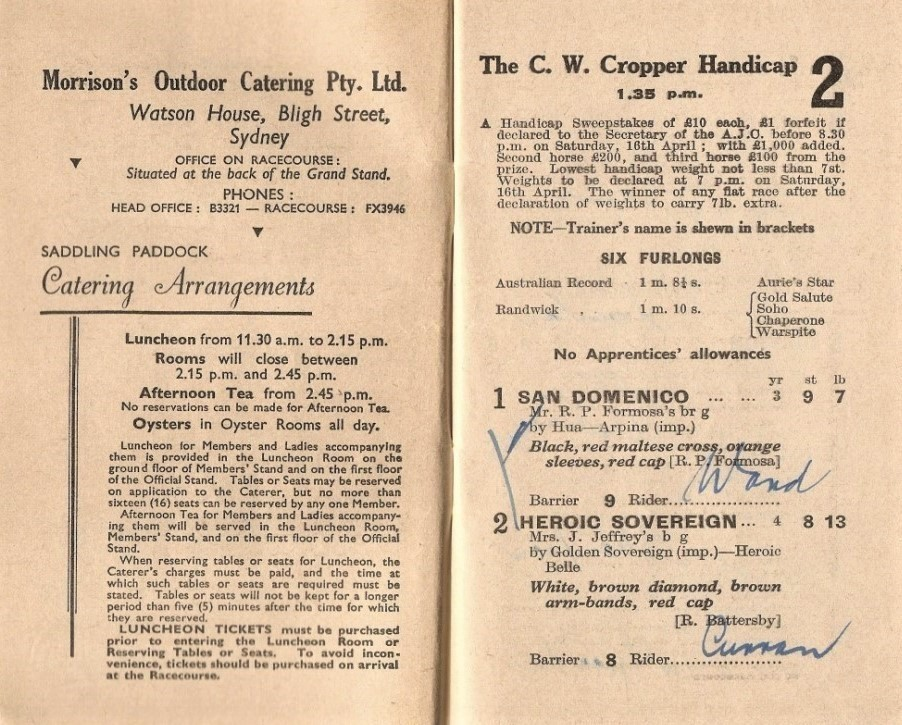
1949 AJC C.W. Cropper Handicap showing winner, San Domenico

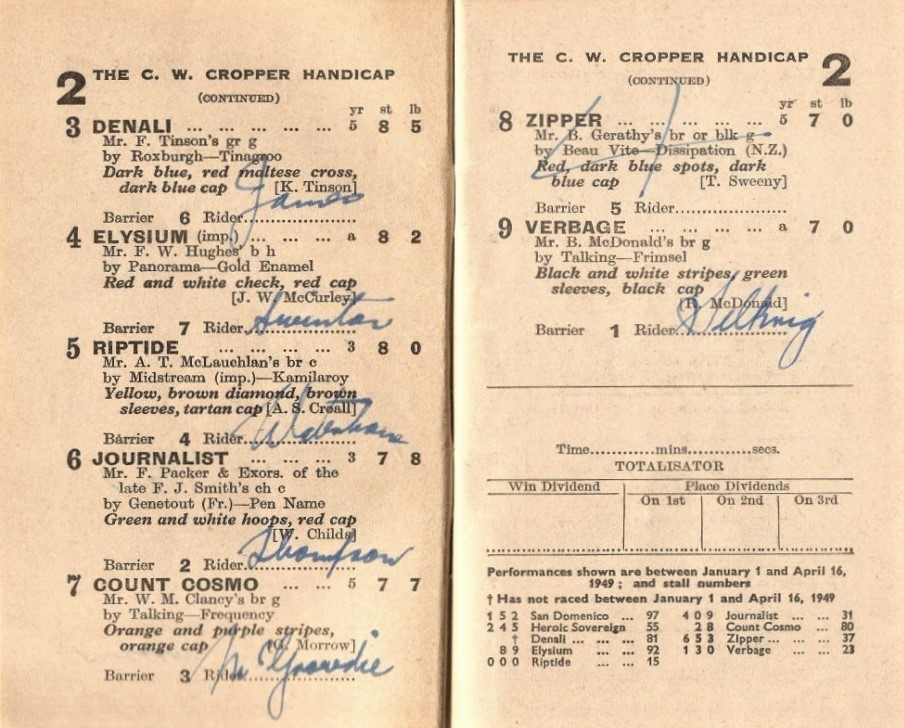
1949 AJC C.W. Cropper Handicap page starters and results

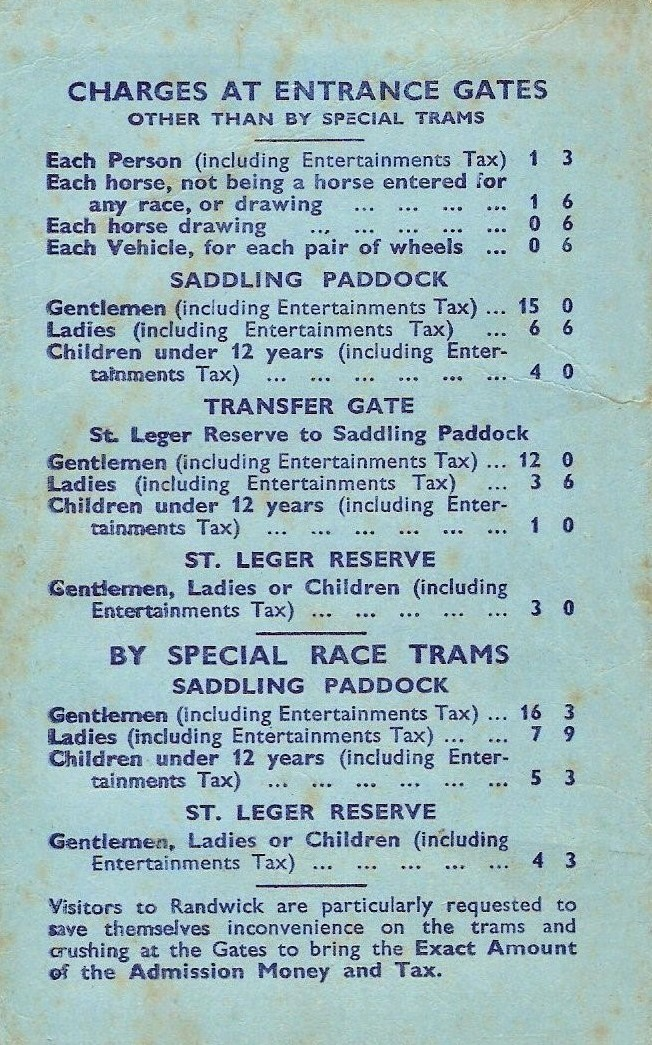
Back cover showing charges at the entrance gates
