= Hobartville Stakes =

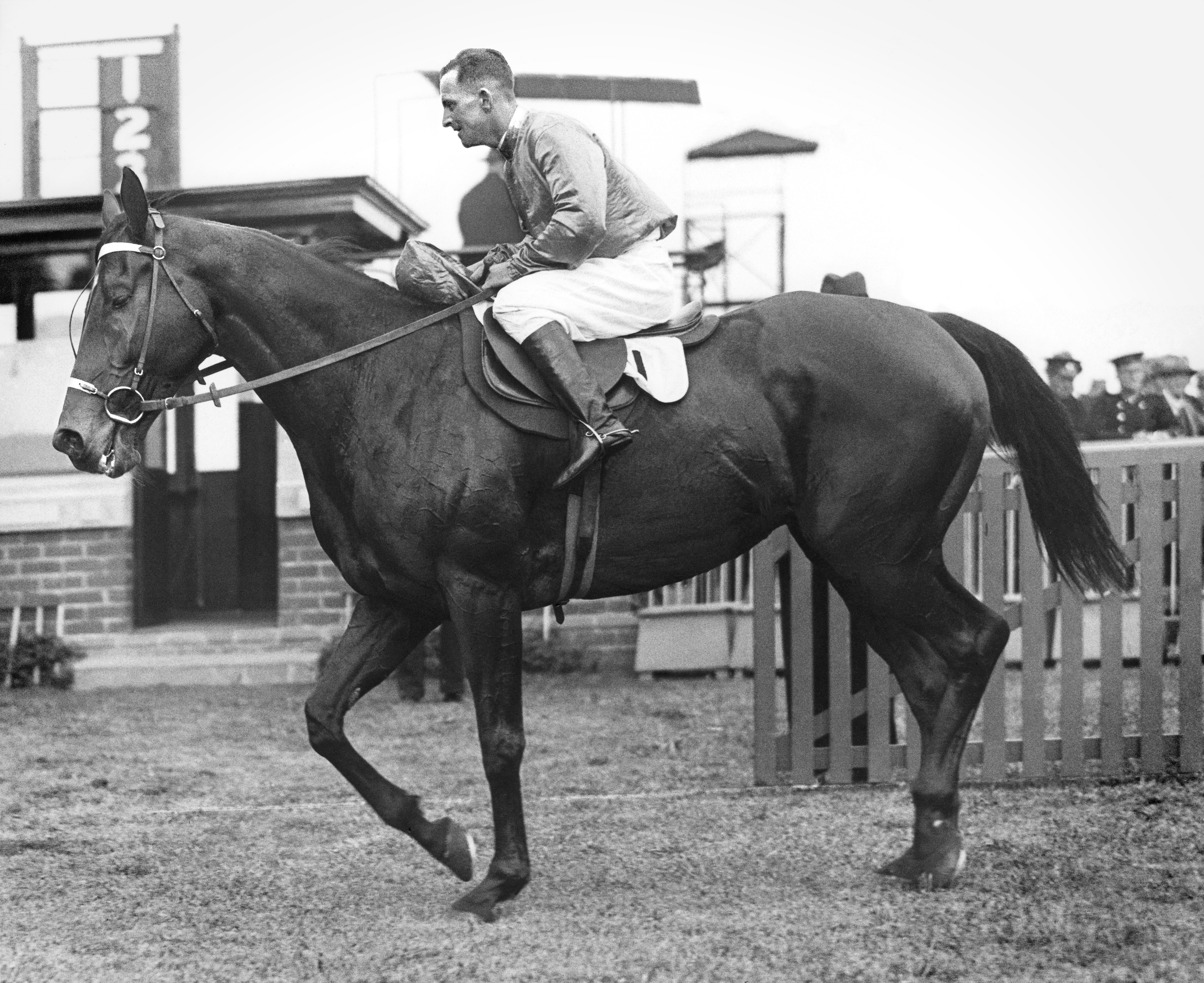
- Amounis, 1925 winner
- Class: Group 2
- Location: Rosehill Gardens Racecourse
- Inaugurated: 1925
- Race type: Thoroughbred
- Sponsor: Kia Ora (2026)

Race information
- Distance: 1,400 metres
- Surface: Turf
- Track: Right-handed
- Qualification: Three year olds
- Weight: Set weights colts and geldings – 56 1/2 kg fillies – 54 1/2 kg
- Purse: $400,000 (2026)

The Hobartville Stakes is an Australian Turf Club Group 2 Thoroughbred horse race, for three-year-olds at set weights, over a distance of 1400 metres. It is held at Rosehill Gardens Racecourse in Sydney, Australia in the February.

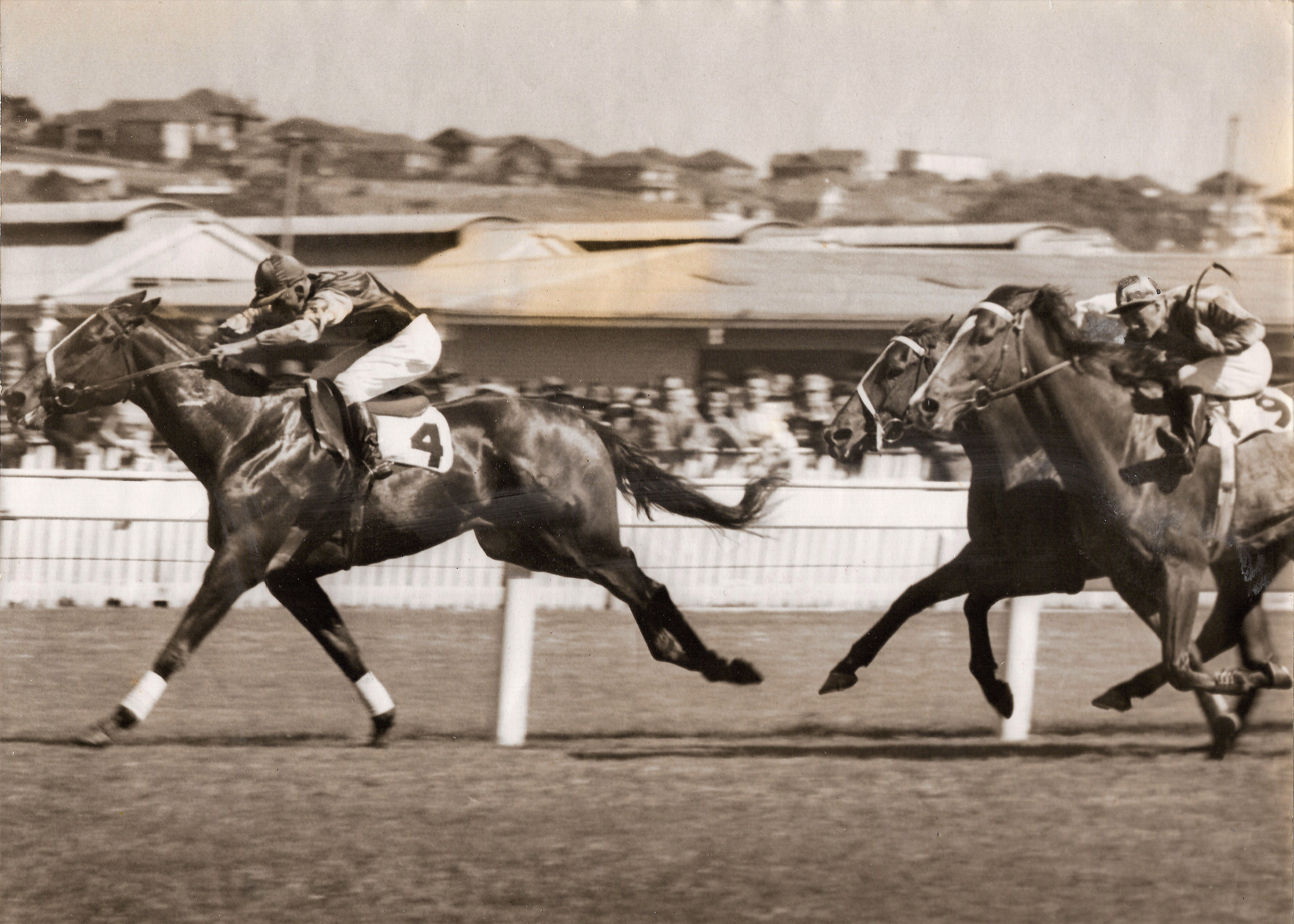
San Domenico, 1948 winner

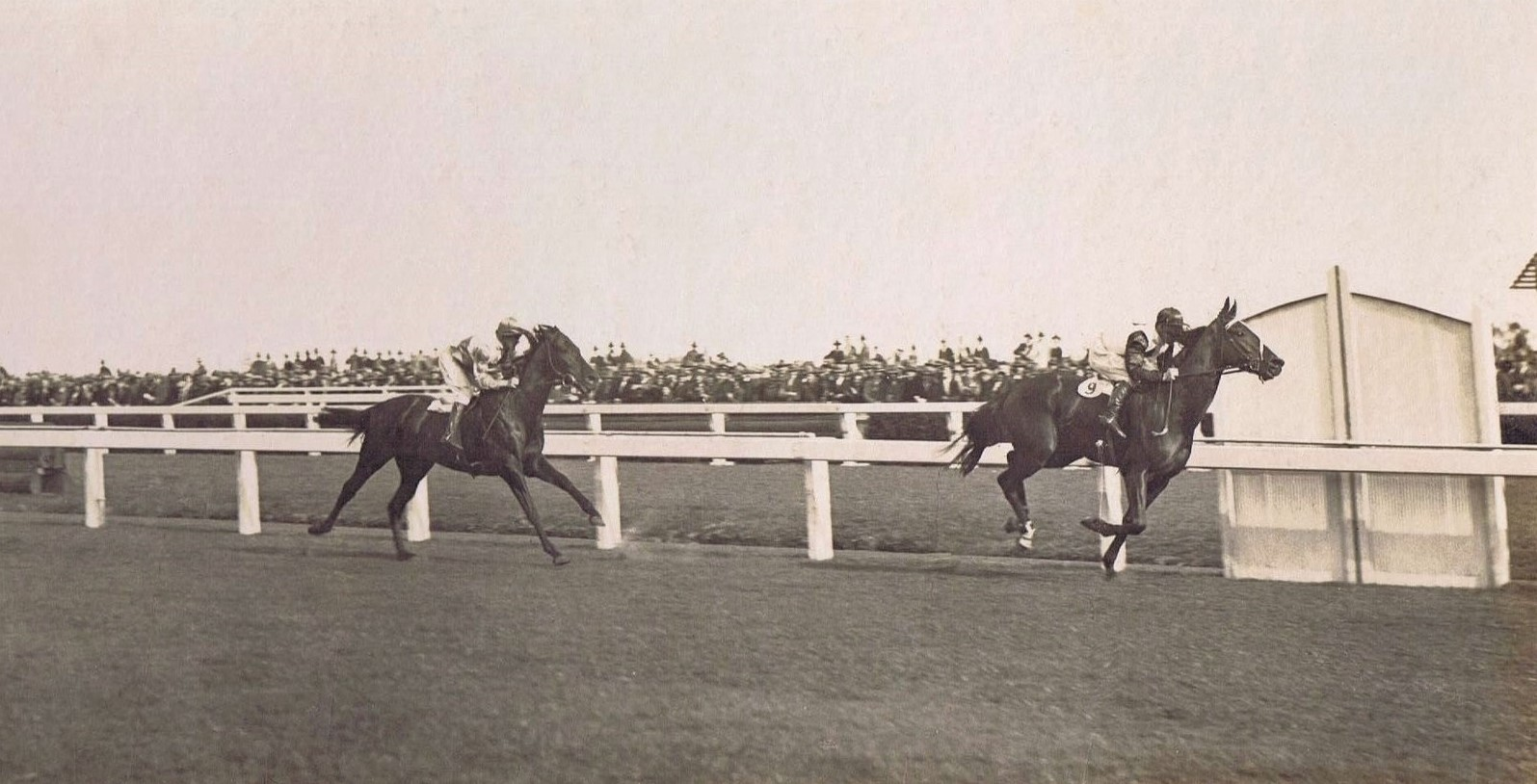
Ammon Ra, 1931 winner

== History ==
Originally an early spring event, it was transferred to the autumn in 1978, along with the three-year-old "triple crown", Canterbury Guineas, Rosehill Guineas and Australian Derby. The Canterbury Guineas was subsequently replaced by the Randwick Guineas in 2006, as the first leg of the "triple crown". The Hobartville Stakes is named after one of the most historic stud farms in New South Wales.

=== Distance ===
- 1925–1972 - 7 furlongs (~1400 metres)
- 1973 onwards - 1400 metres

=== Grade ===
- 1925–1978 - Principal race
- 1979 onwards - Group 2 race

=== Venue ===
- During World War II the event was held at Randwick Racecourse
- 1983–2001 - Warwick Farm Racecourse
- 2002–2005 - Randwick Racecourse
- 2006 onwards - Rosehill Gardens Racecourse
- 2026 - Randwick

=== Gallery of noted winners ===
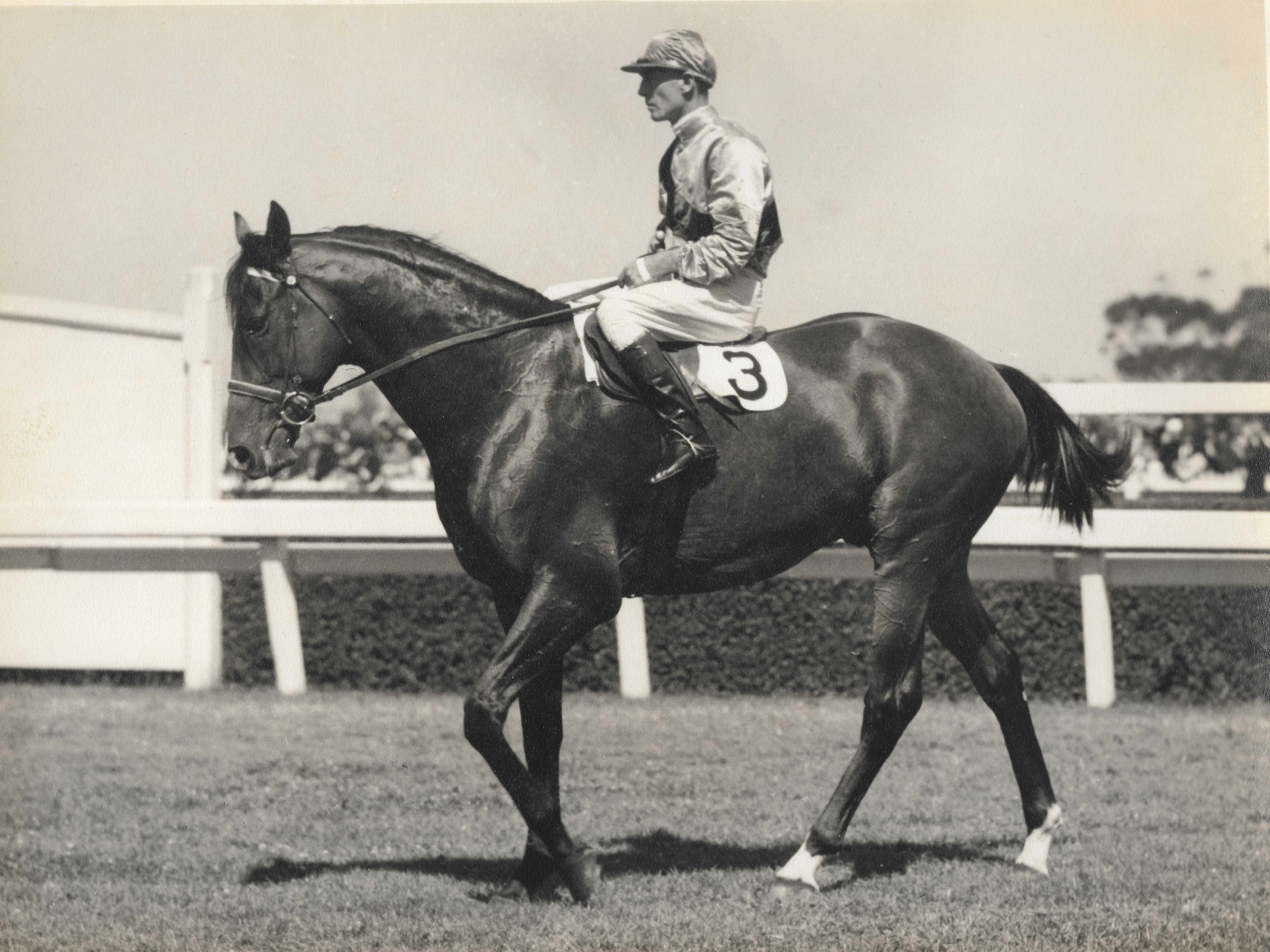
High Caste, 1939 winner

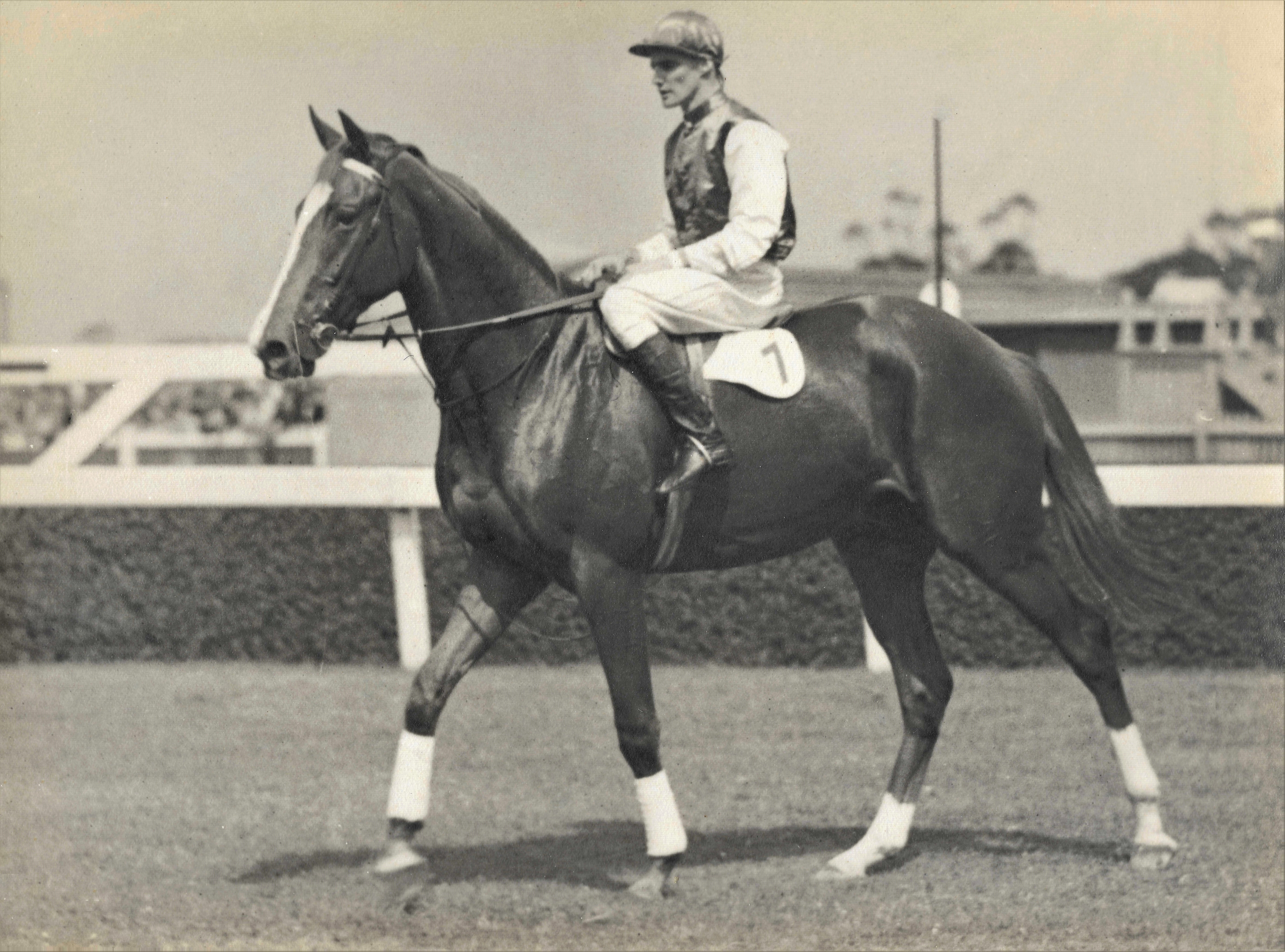
Gold Rod, 1936 winner

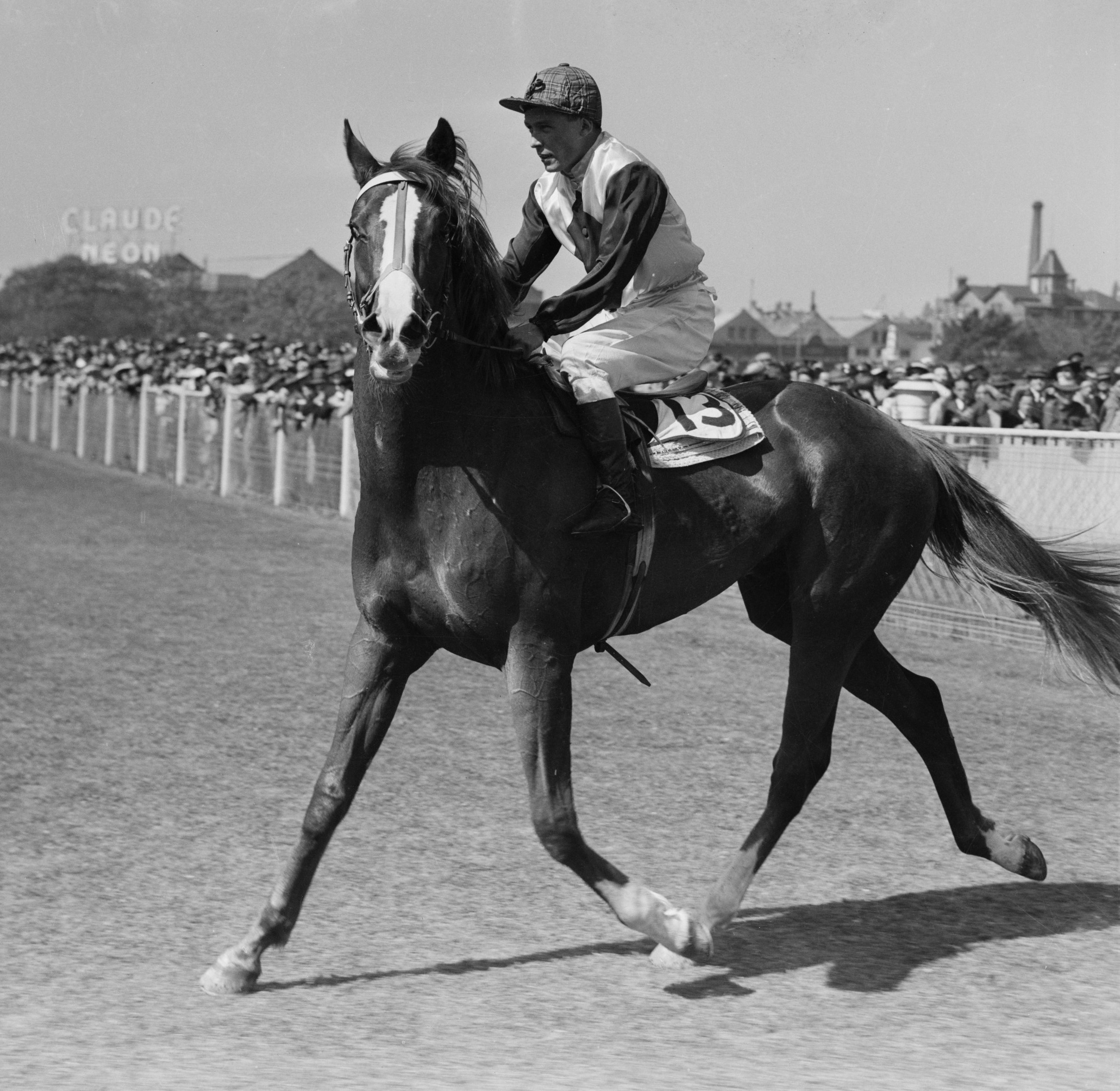
Magnificent, 1945 winner

Flight, 1943 winner

== Winners ==
The following are past winners of the race.

- 2026 - Ninja
- 2025 - Broadsiding
- 2024 - Celestial Legend
- 2023 - Osipenko
- 2022 - Anamoe
- 2021 - Aegon
- 2020 - Brandenburg
- 2019 - The Autumn Sun
- 2018 - Kementari
- 2017 - Man From Uncle
- 2016 - Press Statement
- 2015 - Hallowed Crown
- 2014 - Dissident
- 2013 - Pierro
- 2012 - Wild And Proud
- 2011 - Ilovethiscity
- 2010 - Monton
- 2009 - Mic Mac
- 2008 - Serious Speed
- 2007 - Mutawaajid
- 2006 - Racing To Win
- 2005 - Outback Prince
- 2004 - Impaler
- 2003 - Thorn Park
- 2002 - Lonhro
- 2001 - Sir Clive
- 2000 - Fairway
- 1999 - Arena
- 1998 - Pleasure Giver
- 1997 - Monet's Cove
- 1996 - Nothin’ Leica Dane
- 1995 - Danewin
- 1994 - Clearly Chosen
- 1993 - Navy Seal
- 1992 - Take The Road
- 1991 - Pre Record
- 1990 - Shaftesbury Avenue
- 1989 - Swiftly Carson
- 1988 - High Regard
- 1987 - Merry Ruler
- 1986 - Chanteclair
- 1985 - Phillip
- 1984 - Sir Dapper
- 1983 - Marscay
- 1982 - Rare Form
- 1981 - Shaybisc
- 1980 - †race not held
- 1979 - Bemboka Yacht
- 1978 - Kapalaran
- 1977 - Lord Silver Man
- 1976 - Keegan
- 1975 - Rosie Heir
- 1974 - Manawapoi
- 1973 - Imagele
- 1972 - Outback
- 1971 - Fairy Walk
- 1970 - Baguette
- 1969 - King Bogan
- 1968 - Rajah
- 1967 - Great Exploits
- 1966 - Garcon
- 1965 - Fair Summer
- 1964 - Farnworth
- 1963 - Romanda
- 1962 - Peace Of Mind
- 1961 - Young Brolga
- 1960 - Wenona Girl
- 1959 - Martello Towers
- 1958 - Wiggle
- 1957 - Todman
- 1956 - Commissionaire
- 1955 - Kingster
- 1954 - Pride Of Egypt
- 1953 - Barfleur
- 1952 - Suncup
- 1951 - Hydrogen
- 1950 - Careless
- 1949 - Chastise
- 1948 - San Domenico
- 1947 - Temeraire
- 1946 - Prince Standard
- 1945 - Magnificent
- 1944 - Shannon
- 1943 - Flight
- 1942 - Hall Stand
- 1941 - All Love
- 1940 - Flying Knight
- 1939 - High Caste
- 1938 - Aeolus
- 1937 - Caesar
- 1936 - Gold Rod
- 1935 - Hadrian
- 1934 - Silver King
- 1933 - Limarch
- 1932 - Bronze Hawk
- 1931 - Ammon Ra
- 1930 - Veilmond
- 1929 - Toper
- 1928 - Mollison
- 1927 - Merry Mint
- 1926 - Rampion
- 1925 - Amounis

† Not raced in calendar year due to change of schedule as race moved from early spring to late summer

== See also ==
- List of Australian Group races
- Group races
