= Ammon Ra =

New Zealand Thoroughbred racehorse

- Ammon Ra
- Sire: Limond (GB)
- Grandsire: Desmond (GB)
- Dam: Hyades (NZ)
- Damsire: Hymettus (GB)
- Sex: Gelding
- Foaled: 1928
- Country: New Zealand
- Colour: Bay
- Breeder: Dr E.H.B.Milsom
- Owner: C.C.Sheath
- Trainer: J.T.Jamieson
- Record: 29: 17, 4, 1
- Earnings: £25,831

Major wins
- Trentham Stakes (1931); WRC Wellington Stakes (1931); AJC Sires Produce Stakes (1931); Hobartville Stakes (1931); Chelmsford Stakes (1931); AJC Derby (1931); Caulfield Guineas (1931); St George Stakes (1932); Futurity Stakes (1932); C.M Lloyd Stakes (1932); Rawson Stakes (1932); Chipping Norton Stakes (1932)

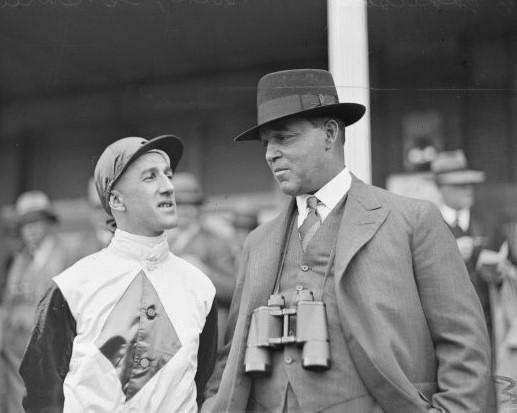
Maurice McCarten and Jack Jamieson.

Ammon Ra (foaled 1928) was a Bay New Zealand thoroughbred gelding. He raced in Australia. Ammon Ra competed from age two to five, recording 17 wins in races from 5 furlongs to 1½ miles. Champion jockey Maurice McCarten won 10 races and the Sydney Jockeys premiership in 1938–39. Later he became the leading Sydney trainer from 1948 to 1949 and 1951 to 1952.

== Breeding ==
Ammon Ra was bred by Dr Edwin Milsom and passed in at auction for 450 guineas. He was raced initially in his colours, then sold for 3,500 guineas. Limond (GB) was the leading sire in New Zealand from 1930 to 1931 and the winner of 9 Derbys in Australia and New Zealand, as well as 25 Southern Hemisphere classics. Limond sired the champion Limerick, Veilmond 1931 AJC St Leger and VRC St Leger, Theo 1934 AJC Derby and VRC Derby and Limarch 1934 AJC St Leger and VRC St Leger.

Dam Hyades (NZ) produced winning fillies in New Zealand, including Prodice 1929 ARC Great Northern Oaks, 1930 ARC Avondale Cup and Phaola 1925 ARC Avondale Stakes.

Breeder, Dr Edwin Milsom qualified as a medical practitioner at Guy's Hospital, London University and was an honorary surgeon for 19 years at Auckland hospital.

== Racing career ==
Ammon Ra raced between 1930 and 1934. He was brilliant in his second and third years, winning the classic 1931 AJC Derby from Johnnie Jason 1931 VRC Derby and defeated champions Chatham in the 1932 C. M. Lloyd Stakes and Nightmarch 1932 AJC Chipping Norton Stakes and 1932 RRC Rawson Stakes. Recurring bleeding issues at 4 and 5 years old forced his retirement in New Zealand.

Trainer Jack Jamieson originally trained from Awapuni, Palmerston North New Zealand. He was a contemporary of trainers H. A. Telford and T. R. George, winning the New Zealand trainers premiership in 1929–1930 and making many successful visits to Sydney before purchasing stables at Botany Street, Randwick in 1934. His notable winners included the champion High Caste, Prince Humphrey 1928 AJC Derby, Closing Time 1933 AJC Villiers Stakes, 1934 VRC Linlithgow Stakes, Limarch 1934 AJC St Leger and VRC St Leger and Gold Salute 1940 Toorak Handicap and 1940 Cantala Stakes. Jamieson died in New Zealand in June 1945.

Owner Clifford Sheath, originally from Auckland, was a Sydney businessman and director of Lifeguard Tobacco Limited.

Ammon Ra's racing record: 29 starts for 17 wins, 4 seconds, 1 thirds and 7 unplaced runs.

== Image gallery ==
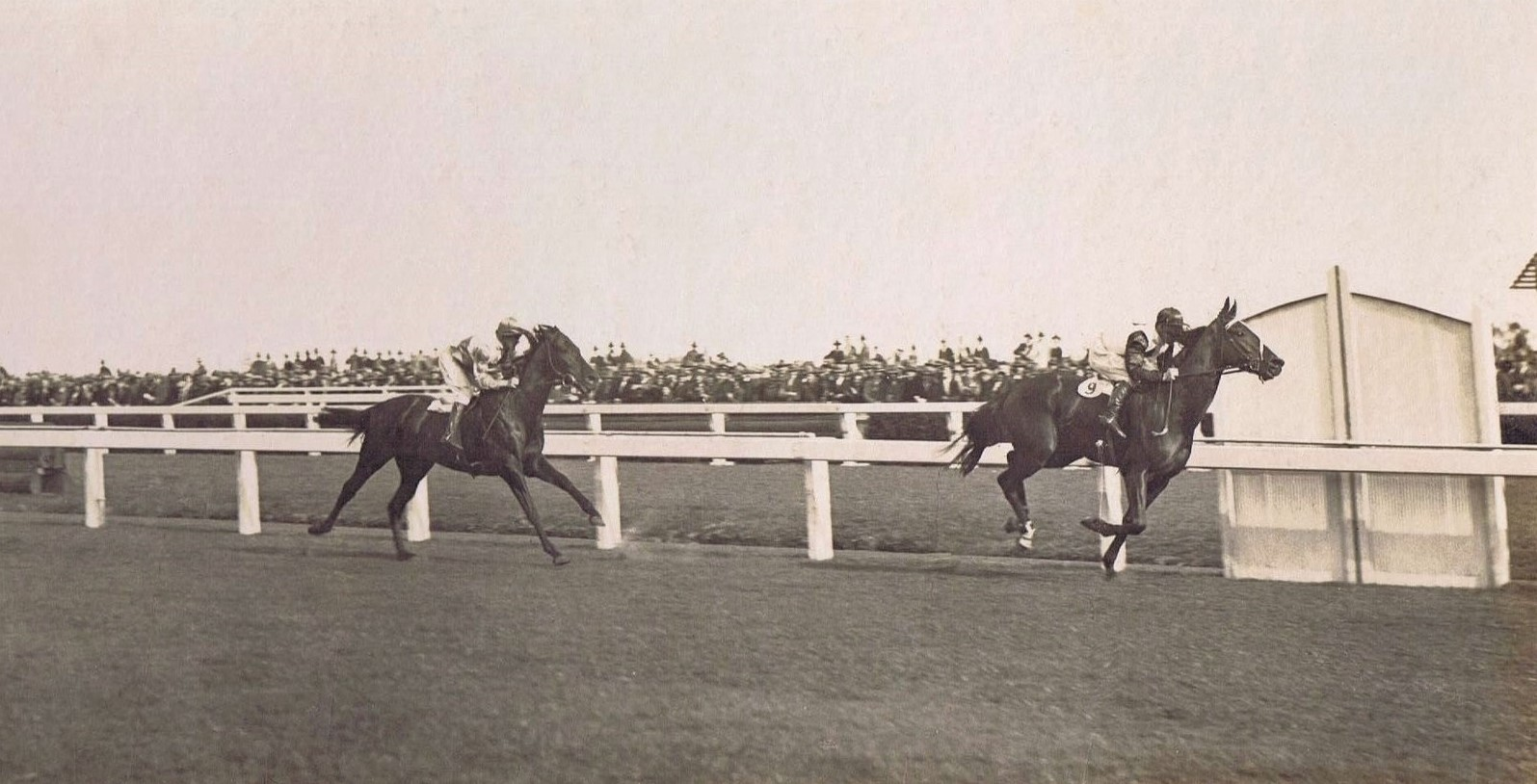
Ammon Ra 1931 VATC Caulfield Guineas Jockey Maurice McCarten

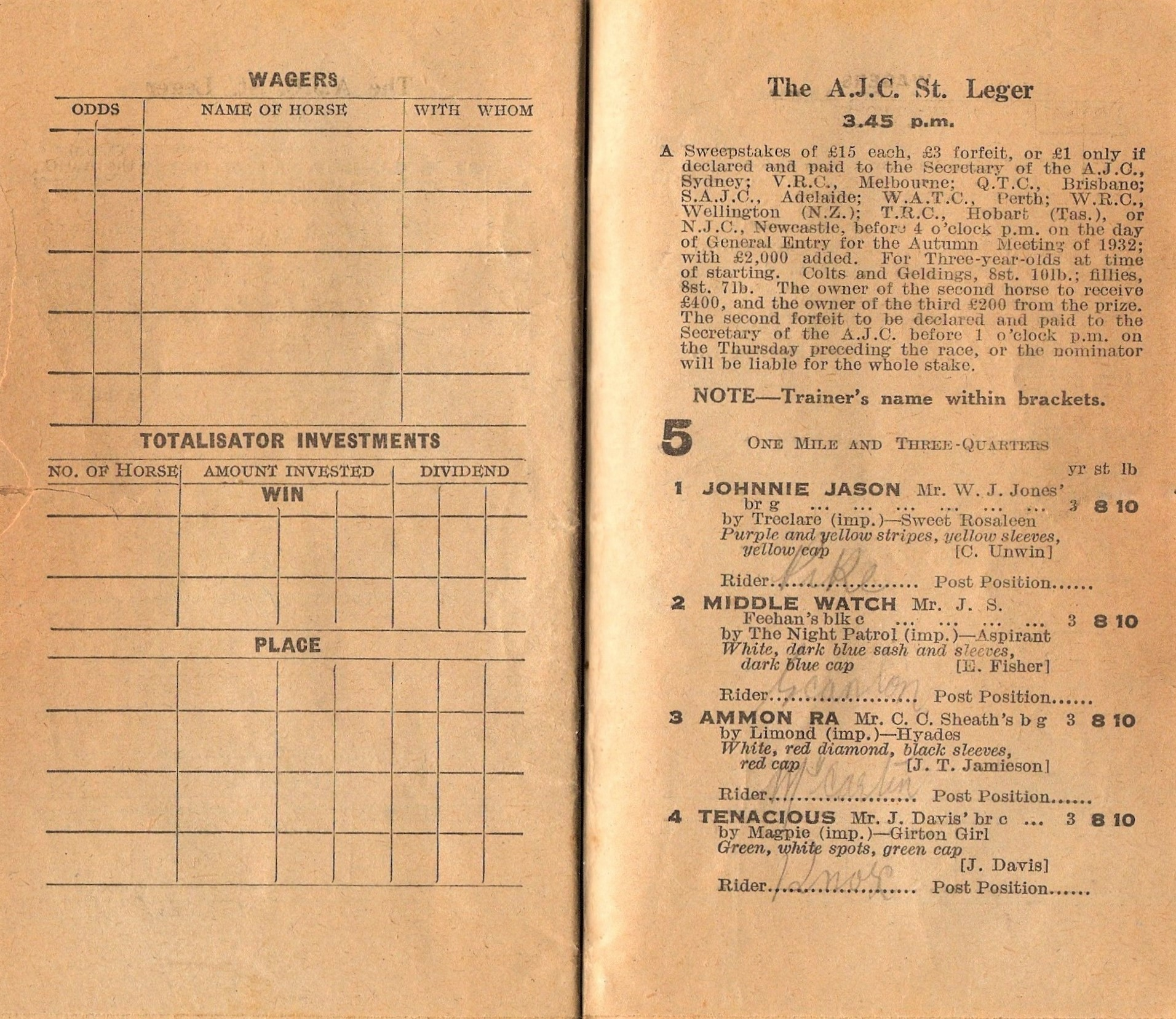
1932 AJC St Leger racebook showing Ammon Ra, placed 2nd.

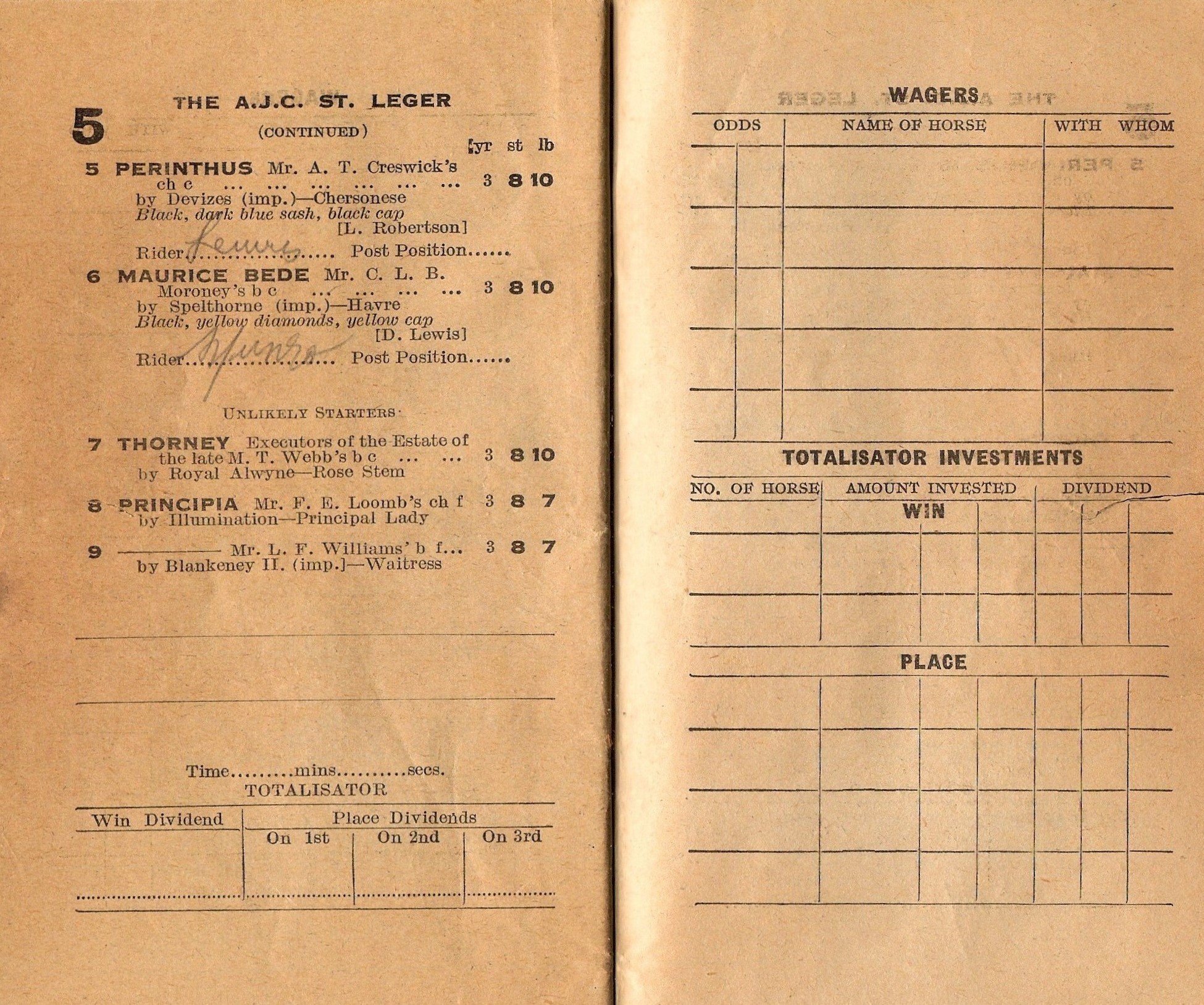
1932 AJC St Leger racebook.
