= San Domenico Stakes =

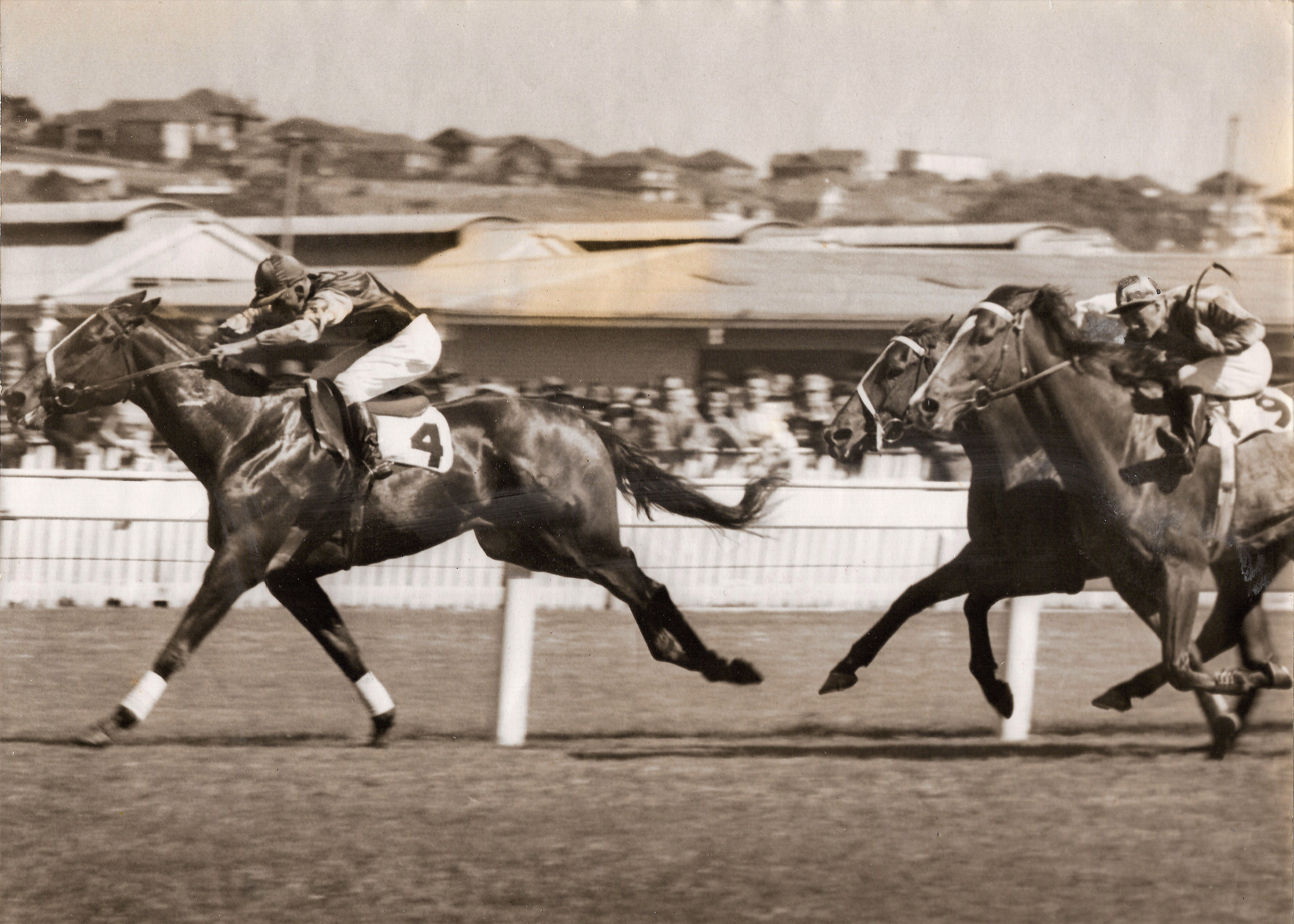
- San Domenico & Arthur Ward.
- Class: Group 3
- Location: Rosehill Gardens Racecourse; Sydney, New South Wales, Australia
- Inaugurated: 1980
- Race type: Thoroughbred – Flat racing
- Sponsor: Smithfield RSL (2023-2026)

Race information
- Distance: 1,100 metres
- Surface: Turf
- Track: Right-handed
- Qualification: Three-year-olds
- Weight: Set weights with penalties
- Purse: $250,000 (2026)

The San Domenico Stakes is an Australian Turf Club Group 3 Thoroughbred horse race for three-year-olds, run at set weights with penalties, over a distance of 1100 metres at Rosehill Gardens Racecourse, Sydney in August.

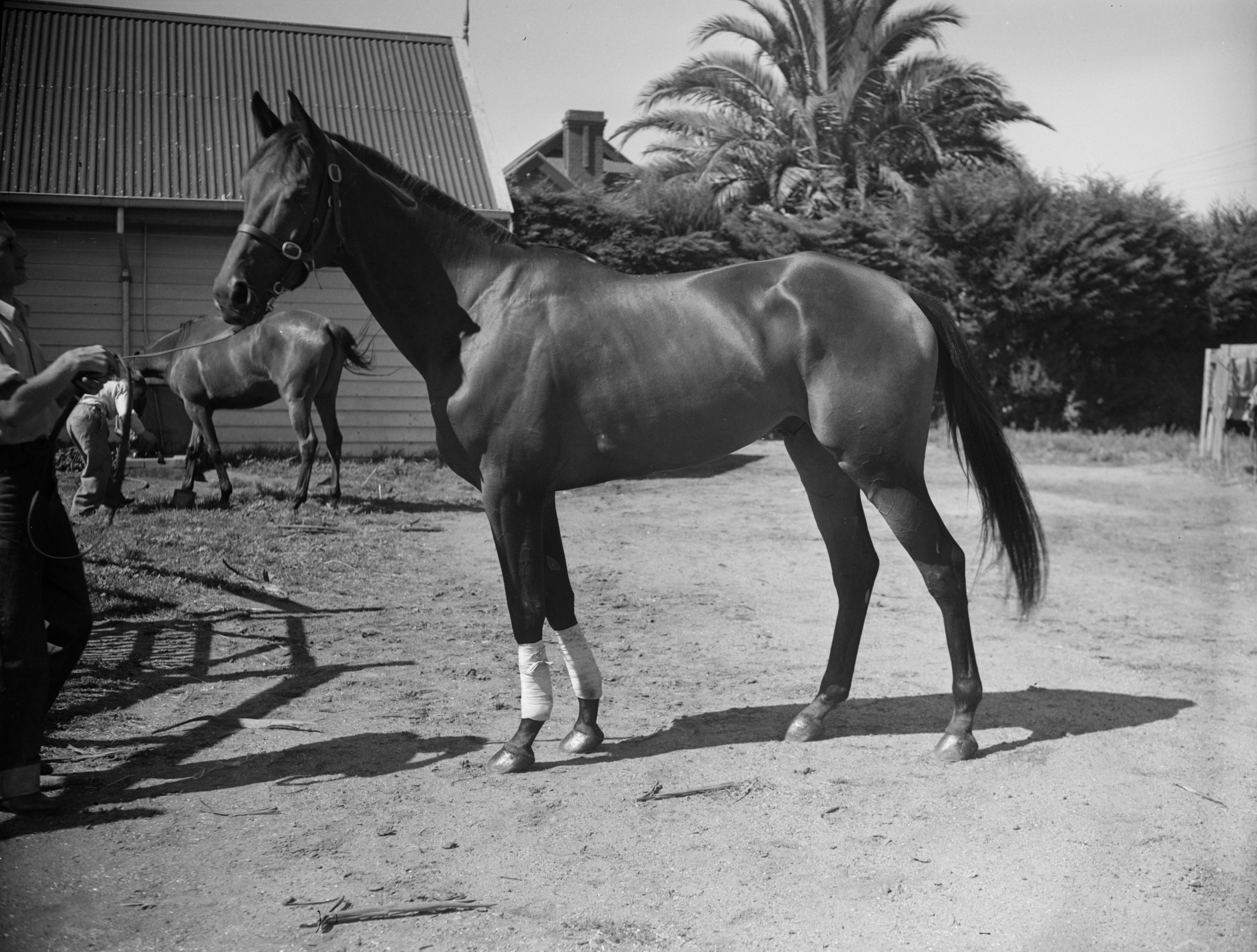
San Domenico, 1950

== History ==
The race is named after former champion sprinter San Domenico, winner of 4 Group 1 races including the 1949 Oakleigh Plate, 1950 George Main Stakes, 1952 Futurity Stakes and the 1952 All Aged Stakes.

=== Distance ===
- 1980–2007 – 1000 metres
- 2008 – 1100 metres
- 2009–2010 – 1000 metres
- 2011 onwards - 1100 metres

=== Grade ===
- 1980–1983 - Listed Race
- 1984–1985 - Group 3
- 1986–2004 - Group 2
- 2005 onwards - Group 3

=== Venue ===
- 1980–1983 - Randwick Racecourse
- 1984–1985 - Warwick Farm Racecourse
- 1986 - Randwick Racecourse
- 1987–1989 - Warwick Farm Racecourse
- 1990 - Randwick Racecourse
- 1991–1992 - Warwick Farm Racecourse
- 1993–1999 - Randwick Racecourse
- 2000 - Warwick Farm Racecourse
- 2001–2007 - Randwick Racecourse
- 2008 - Rosehill Gardens Racecourse
- 2009–2010 - Randwick Racecourse
- 2011–2020 - Rosehill Gardens Racecourse
- 2021 - Kembla Grange Racecourse
- 2022 onwards - Rosehill Gardens Racecourse

== Winners ==
The following are past winners of the race.

- 2026 - Guest House
- 2025 - Raging Force
- 2024 - Storm Boy
- 2023 - Libertad
- 2022 - Sweet Ride
- 2021 - In The Congo
- 2020 - Anders
- 2019 - Exceedance
- 2018 - Graff
- 2017 - Pariah
- 2016 - Star Turn
- 2015 - Japonisme
- 2014 - Nostradamus
- 2013 - Va Pensiero
- 2012 - Snitzerland
- 2011 - Foxwedge
- 2010 - Obsequious
- 2009 - Shellscrape
- 2008 - Duporth
- 2007 - Sliding Cube
- 2006 - Gold Edition
- 2005 - Media
- 2004 - Charge Forward
- 2003 - Regimental Gal
- 2002 - Star Of Florida
- 2001 - Mistegic
- 2000 - Zariz
- 1999 - Testa Rossa
- 1998 - race not held
- 1997 - General Nediym
- 1996 - Sovereign State
- 1995 - Our Maizcay
- 1994 - Lord Jim
- 1993 - Sashed
- 1992 - Surtee
- 1991 - Tierce
- 1990 - Acecay
- 1989 - Show County
- 1988 - Merimbula Bay
- 1987 - Omnicorp
- 1986 - Gallery Level
- 1985 - Let's Get Physical
- 1984 - Quiet Little Drink
- 1983 - Sir Dapper
- 1982 - Rosebrook
- 1981 - Black Shoes
- 1980 - Proud Knight

== See also ==
- Up and Coming Stakes
- List of Australian Group races
- Group races
