= Southern Cross Stakes =

Southern Cross Stakes registered as Frederick Clissold Stakes
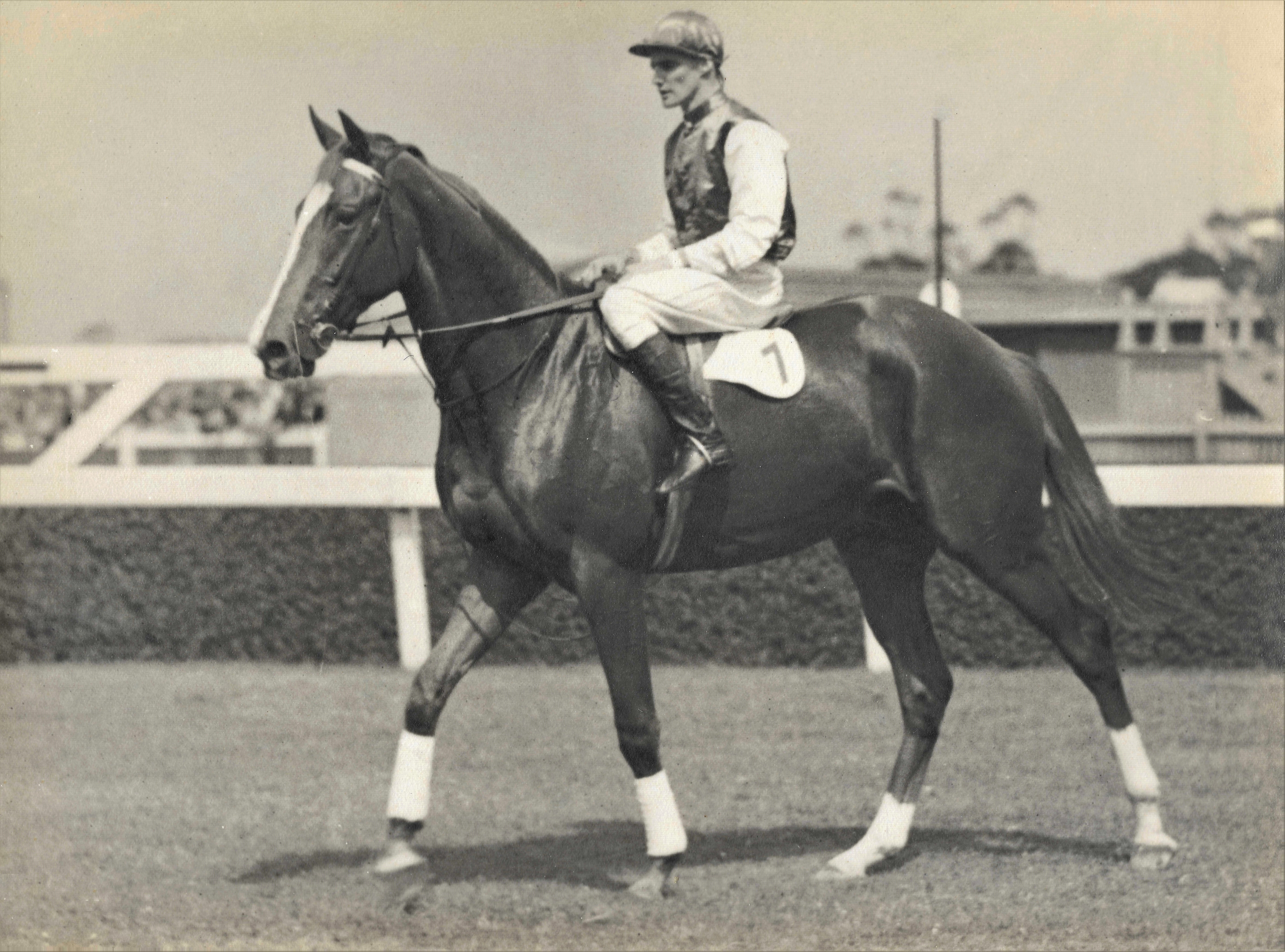
- Gold Rod, 1940 winner
- Class: Group 3
- Location: Rosehill Gardens Racecourse or Randwick Racecourse, Sydney, Australia
- Inaugurated: 1940
- Race type: Thoroughbred
- Sponsor: Schweppes (2025)

Race information
- Distance: 1,200 metres
- Surface: Turf
- Qualification: Horses three years old and older
- Weight: Set weights with penalties
- Purse: $250,000 (2026)

The Southern Cross Stakes, registered as the Frederick Clissold Stakes, is an Australian Turf Club Group 3 Thoroughbred horse race for horses aged three years old and upwards, over a distance of 1200 metres, held in Sydney, Australia in February.

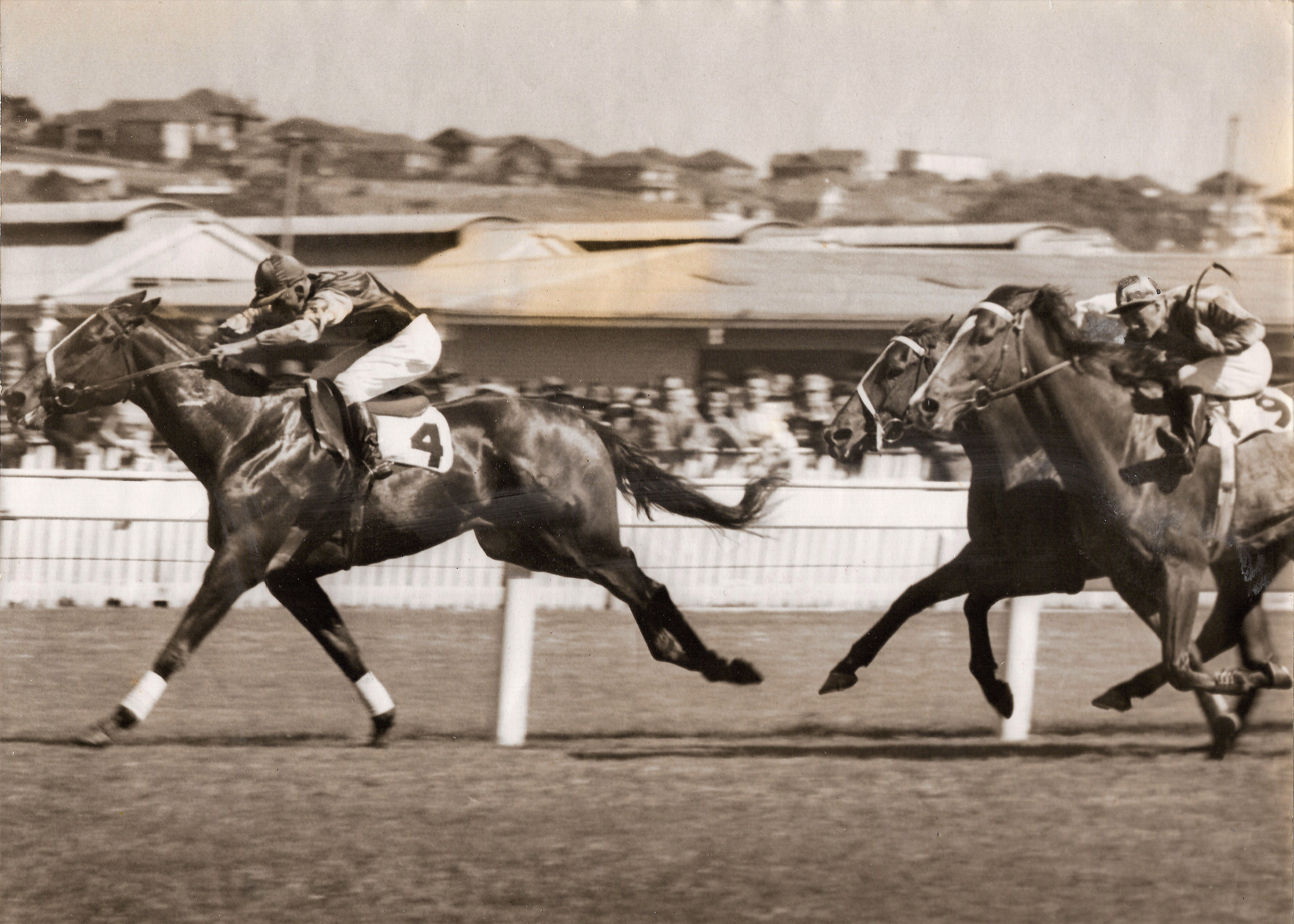
San Domenico, 1950 winner

== History ==
The registered race name is named after Frederick William Clissold, former director and founding member of Canterbury Park Racing Club, who died in 1947, one year after the inaugural running of the race bearing his name.

=== Name ===
- 1940–1992 - Frederick Clissold Handicap
- 1993 - Anniversary Cup
- 1994 - Frederick Clissold Handicap
- 1995 - Frederick Clissold Quality
- 1996–1998 - Frederick Clissold Handicap
- 1999–2002 - Frederick Clissold Stakes
- 2003 - Premier Express Freight Stakes
- 2004–2008 - Frederick Clissold Stakes
- 2009 onwards - Southern Cross Stakes

=== Grade ===
- 1940–1979 - Principal race
- 1980–1988 - Listed race
- 1989 onwards – Group 3 race

=== Distance ===
- 1940–1972 - 6 furlongs (~1200m)
- 1975 onwards - 1200 metres

=== Venue ===
- 1989–1990 - Canterbury Park Racecourse
- 1991–1994 - Rosehill Gardens Racecourse
- 1995 - Canterbury Park Racecourse
- 1996–2005 - Rosehill Gardens Racecourse
- 2006–2011 - Randwick Racecourse
- 2012 - Rosehill Gardens Racecourse
- 2013 - Warwick Farm Racecourse
- 2014 - 2023 - Randwick Racecourse
- 2024 onwards - Rosehill Gardens Racecourse

=== 1945 racebook ===
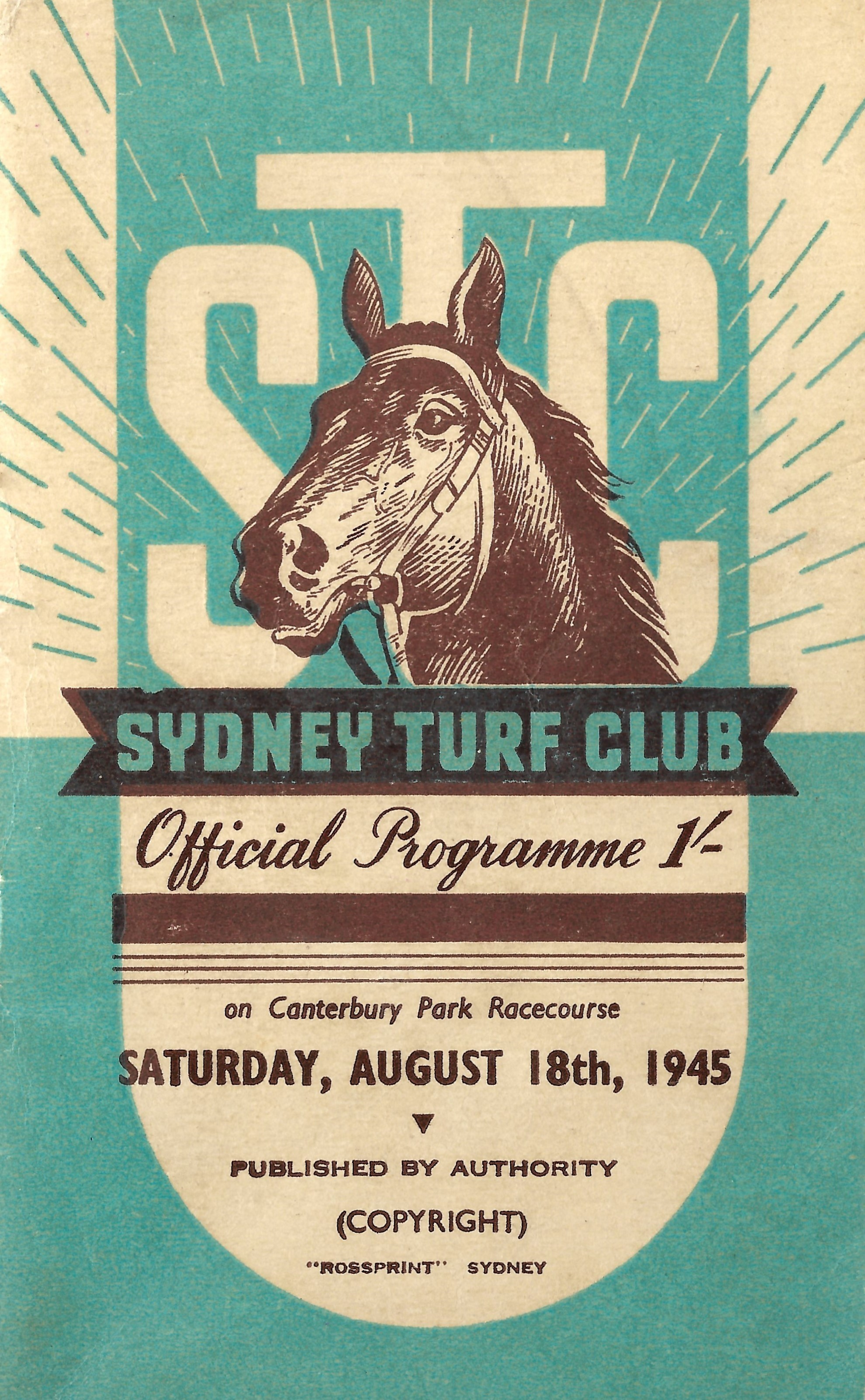
1945 STC Frederick Clissold Handicap front cover

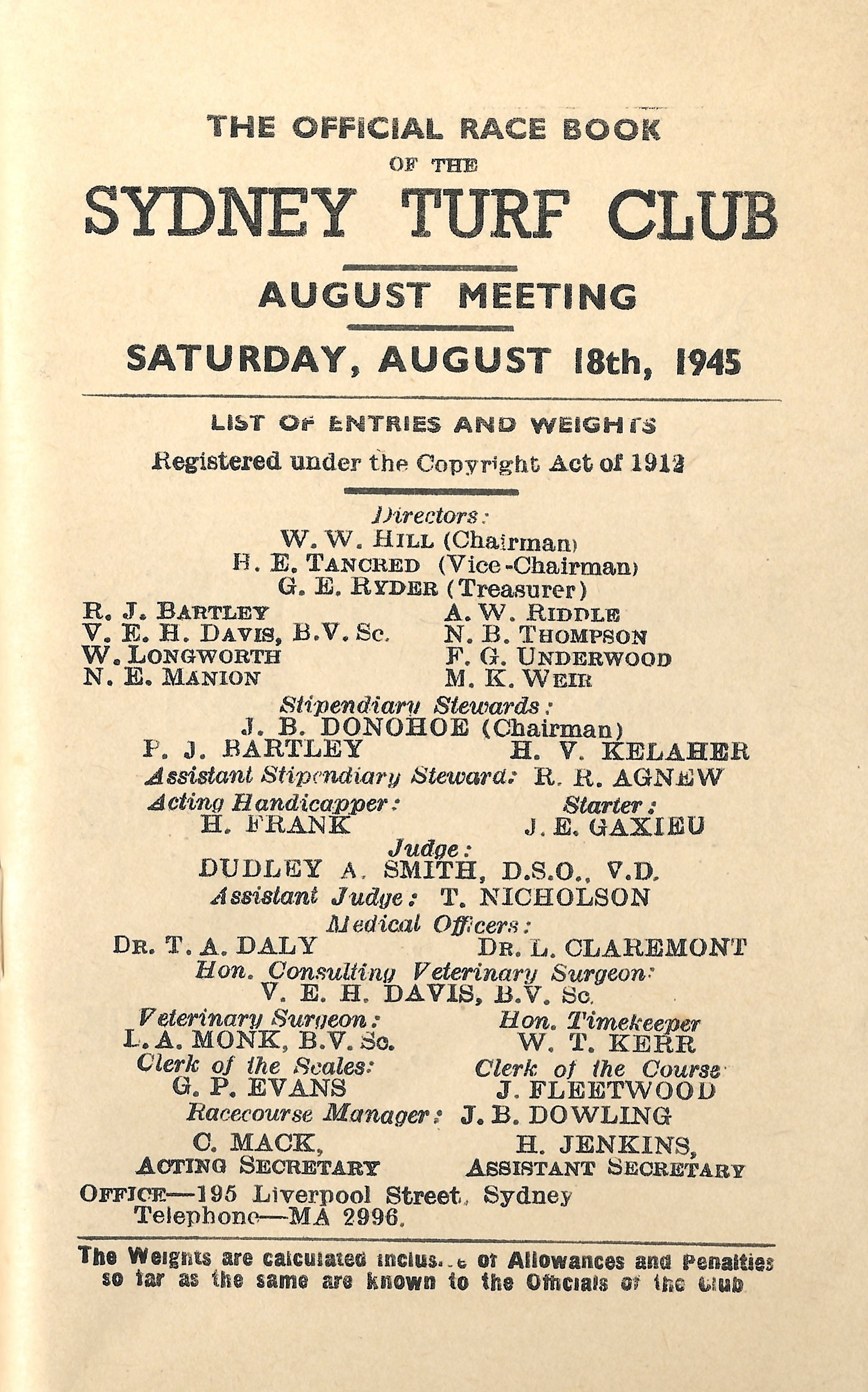
1945 STC Frederick Clissold Handicap raceday officials

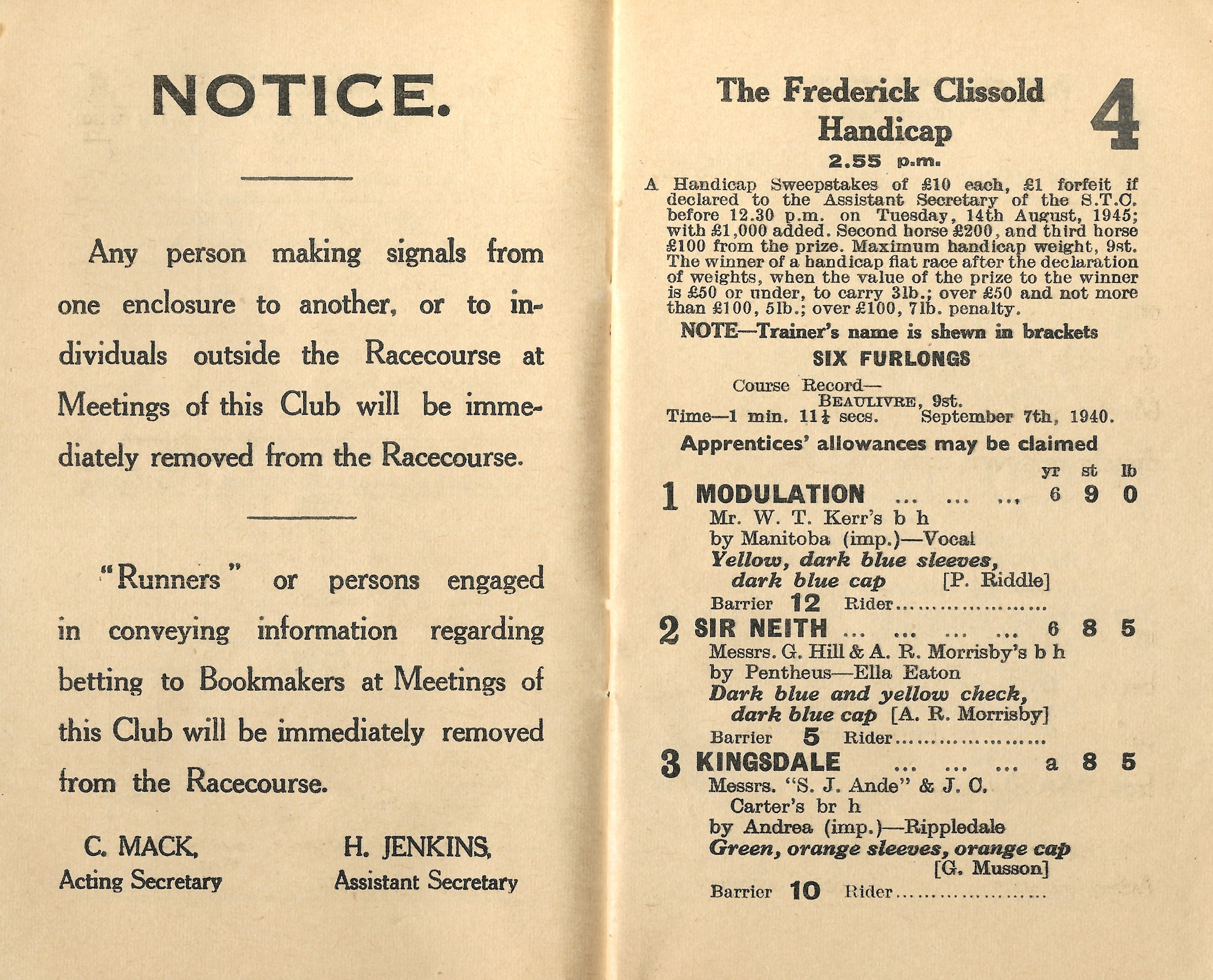
1945 STC Frederick Clissold Handicap starters and results

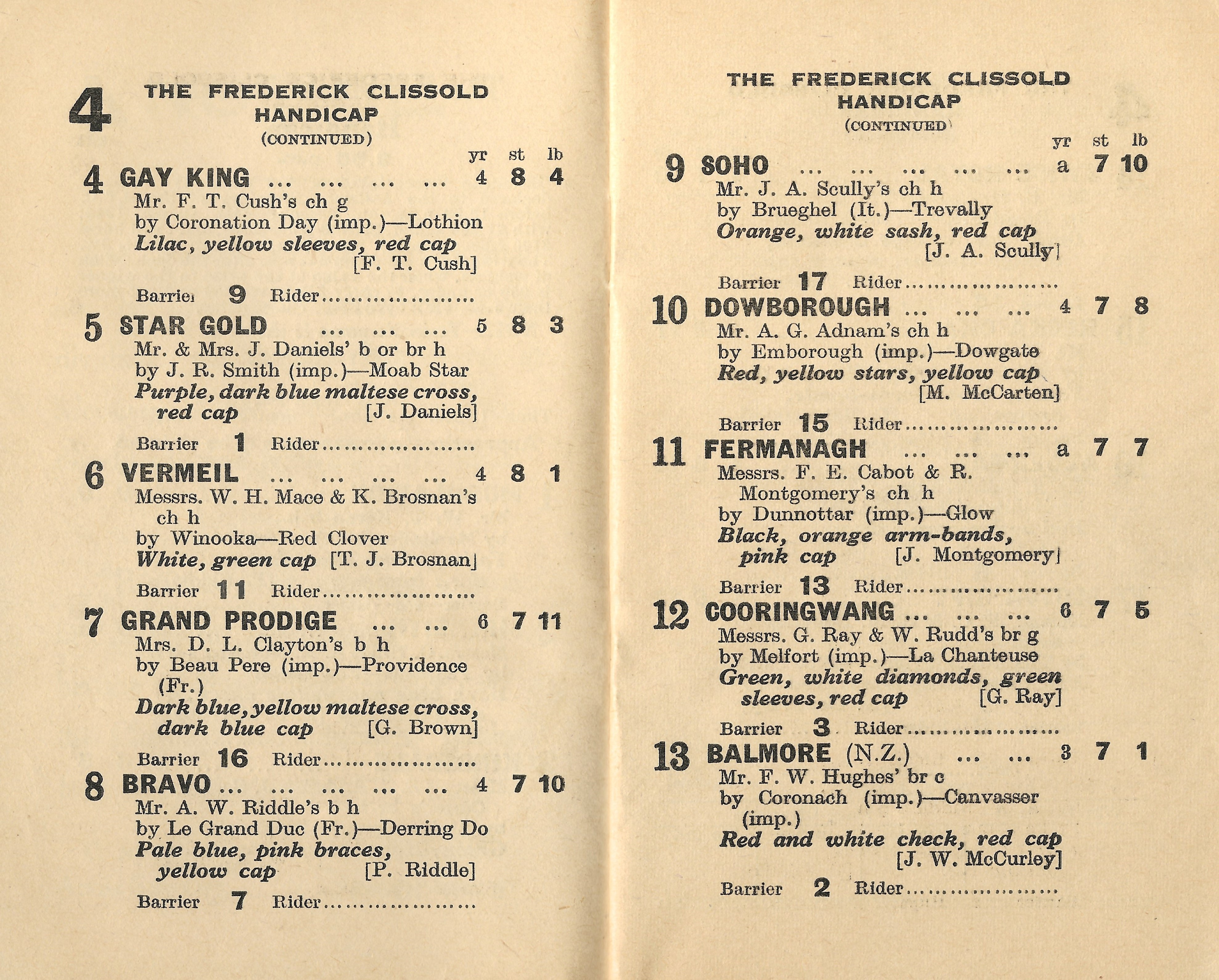
1945 STC Frederick Clissold Handicap winner, Gay King

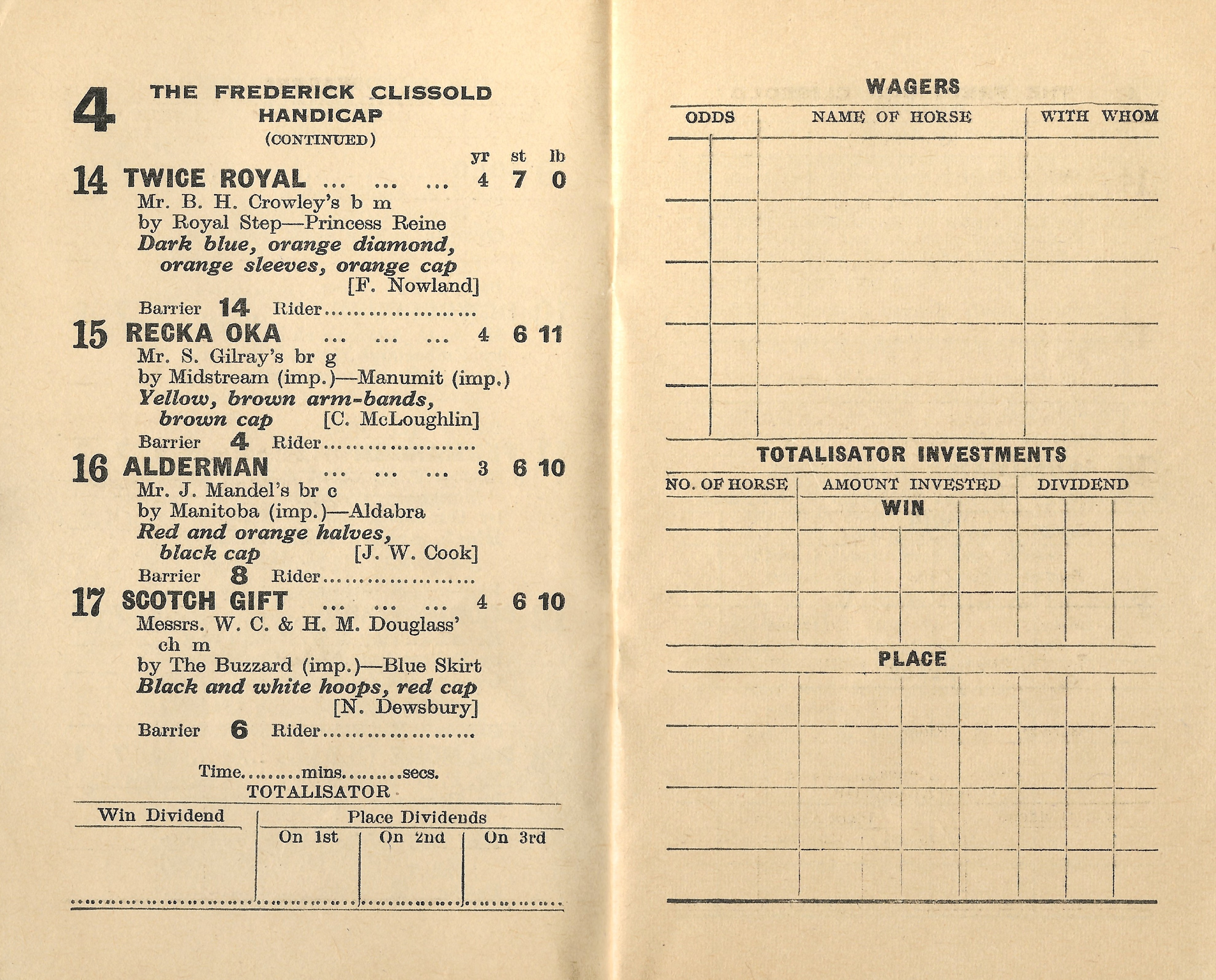
1945 STC Frederick Clissold Handicap starters and results

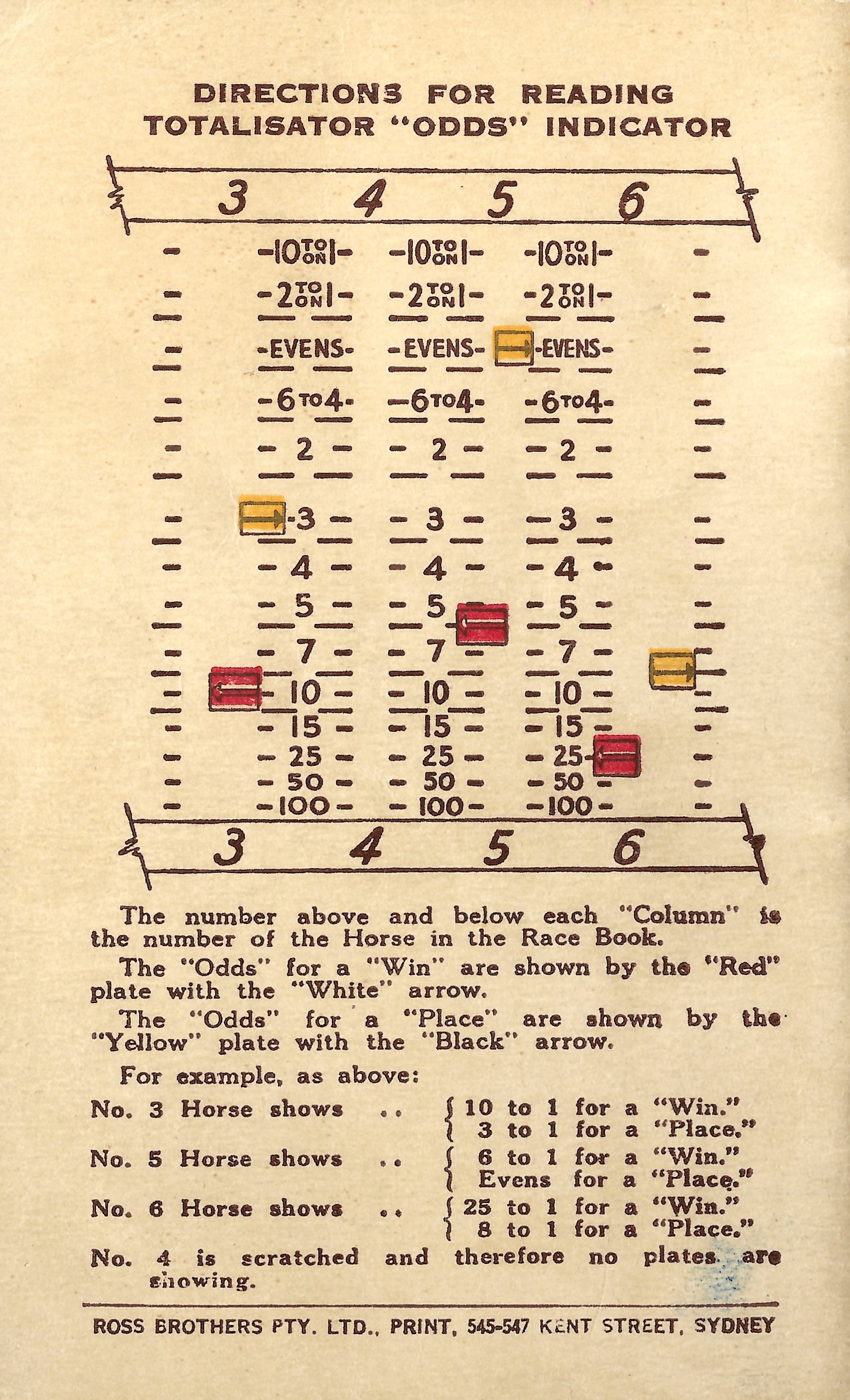
Back cover showing totalisator odds indicator

== Winners ==
Past winners of the race are as follows.

- 2026 - Willaidow
- 2025 - Willaidow
- 2024 - Lady Laguna
- 2023 - Quantico
- 2022 - Lost And Running
- 2021 - Masked Crusader
- 2020 - Special Reward
- 2019 - Eckstein
- 2018 - Kaepernick
- 2017 - Le Romain
- 2016 - Big Money
- 2015 - Heart Testa
- 2014 - Terravista
- 2013 - Skytrain
- 2012 - No Evidence Needed
- 2011 - Sister Madly
- 2010 - Kenny's World
- 2009 - Marchinski
- 2008 - Hoystar
- 2007 - The Free Stater
- 2006 - Collate
- 2005 - Cool Front
- 2004 - Britt’s Best
- 2003 - Gordo
- 2002 - Lord Essex
- 2001 - Ab Initio
- 2000 - Pimpala Prince
- 1999 - Ab Initio
- 1998 - Confiscate
- 1997 - Secret Savings
- 1996 - Danewin
- 1995 - Alert Me
- 1994 - Deposition
- 1993 - Big Dreams
- 1992 - Friend’s Venture
- 1991 - Joanne
- 1990 - Comrade
- 1989 - Diamond Benny
- 1988 - Wong
- 1987 - Swift Cheval
- 1986 - Avon Angel
- 1985 - Pete’s Gold
- 1984 - Gelsomino
- 1983 - Bronze Spirit
- 1982 - Ubetido
- 1981 - Goreham
- 1980 - Brandy Slipper
- 1979 - Scomeld
- 1978 - Always Welcome
- 1977 - Tiger Town
- 1976 - Hartshill
- 1975 - Let’s Fly
- 1974 - race not held
- 1973 - race not held
- 1972 - Gunsynd
- 1971 - Bogan Rea
- 1970 - Biarritz Star
- 1969 - Roman Consul
- 1968 - Illusionist
- 1967 - Red Clinker
- 1966 - Aldor
- 1965 - Florida Keys
- 1964 - Here I Come
- 1963 - State Martial
- 1962 - Grammar Lad
- 1961 - Tipperary Star
- 1960 - Dark Night
- 1959 - Winchester
- 1958 - Jester
- 1957 - Juggler
- 1956 - Evening Peal
- 1955 - My Hali
- 1954 - Regoli
- 1953 - Nagpuni
- 1952 - Osborne
- 1951 - Aerofoil
- 1950 - San Domenico
- 1949 - Cognac
- 1948 - Persian Prince
- 1947 - Lackaboy
- 1946 - Petulance
- 1945 - Gay King
- 1944 - race not held
- 1943 - race not held
- 1942 - race not held
- 1941 - Amiable
- 1940 - Gold Rod

== See also ==
- List of Australian Group races
- Group races
