= Winooka =

Australian thoroughbred

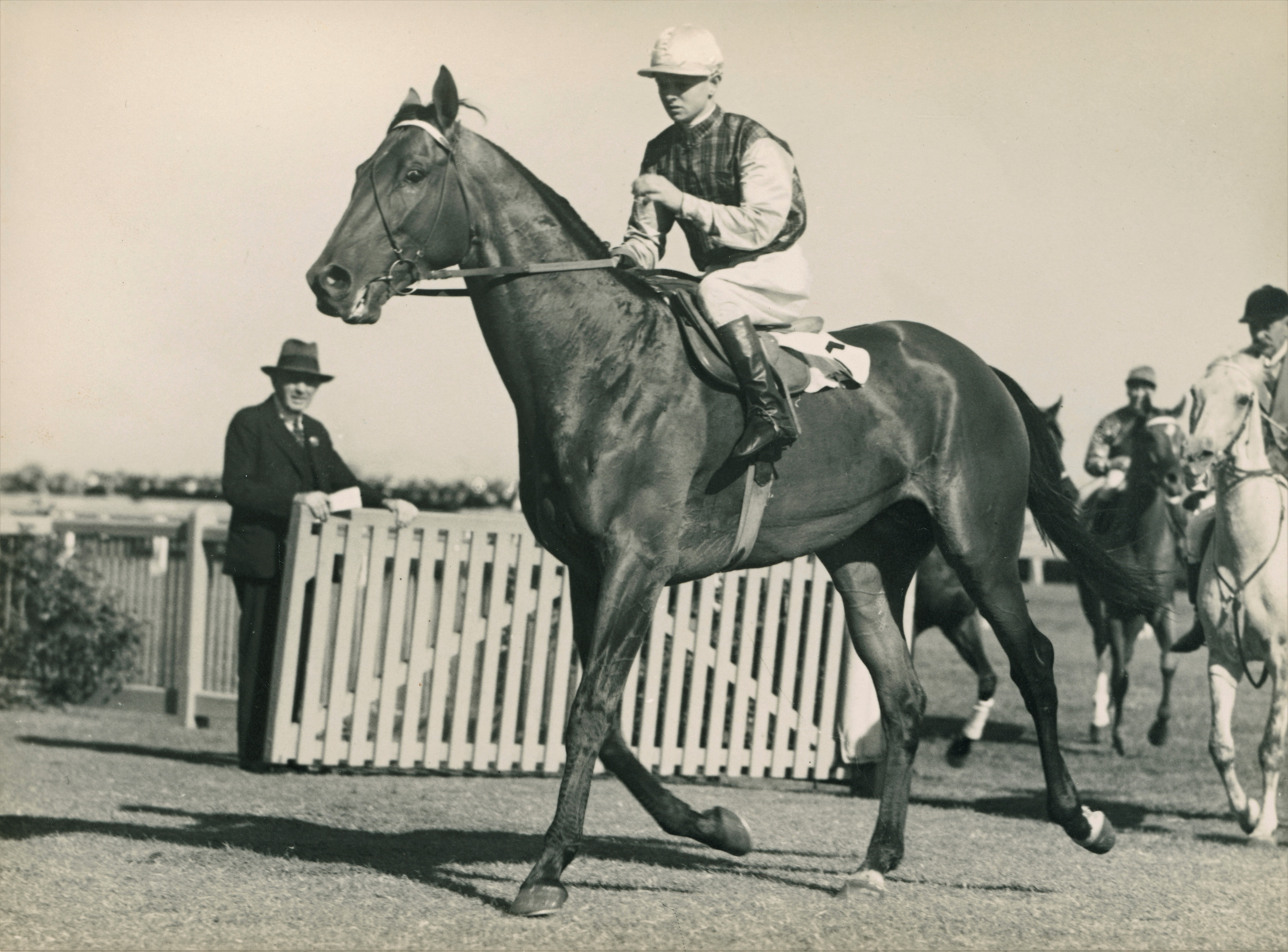
- Winooka & Edgar Britt; Caulfield Racecourse
- Sire: Windbag (AUS)
- Grandsire: Magpie (GB)
- Dam: Kanooka (AUS)
- Damsire: The Welkin (GB)
- Sex: Stallion
- Foaled: 1928
- Country: Australia
- Colour: Bay
- Breeder: Percy Miller Kia Ora Stud
- Owner: H.C. Taylor; A.J. Mathews & W.A. Macdonald
- Trainer: Tim Brosnan; Mick Polson
- Record: 39: 15, 7, 6

Major wins
- Futurity Stakes (1933); Doncaster Handicap (1933); All Aged Plate (1933); C.W.Cropper Handicap (1933); Pimlico Baltimore Handicap (1933); Pimlico Autumn Handicap (1933)

Winooka (foaled 1928) was a bay Australian thoroughbred stallion who raced for 5 seasons from a two-year-old to a six-year-old including America recording major wins from 6 furlongs to 1 mile and winning jockeys being Stan Davidson from Newcastle and Sydney Australian Racing Hall of Fame inductees Jim Pike and Edgar Britt.

== Breeding ==
Winooka was bred by Percy Miller at Kia Ora Stud Scone in the Hunter Valley. Sire Windbag (AUS) winner of 1925 VRC Melbourne Cup with major winners including the champion miler Chatham 1932 & 1934 MVRC WS Cox Plate, 1932 & 1933 Epsom Handicap and Liberal 1932 VATC Caulfield Guineas, 1932 VRC Derby and VATC Underwood Stakes.

Dam Kanooka (AUS) won the 1925 AJC Gimcrack Stakes at Randwick Racecourse.

== Racing Career ==
Winooka was purchased at the 1930 Sydney yearling sales for 290 guineas by H.C. Taylor from Scone and originally trained in Brisbane by Tim Brosnan of Lough Neagh fame. After 2 starts was sold to new owners W.A. McDonald and A.J. Mathews for 1,000 guineas who were well known Sydney bookmakers.

Winooka raced between 1930 and 1935 winner of 3 Group 1 races in the modern era the 1933 VATC Futurity Stakes, Caulfield 7 furlong record, 1933 AJC Doncaster Handicap carrying 63 kg in Australasian record time, 1933 AJC All Aged Plate by 5 lengths and second 1935 VATC Oakleigh Plate carrying 66 kg.

In 1933, Winooka was shipped to the United States as a five year old with trainer Mick Polson and jockey Edgar Britt to compete in nine highly publicized races. Together, they won four total races. Winooka won two match races at Tanforan Racetrack and Longacres Racktrack. At Pimlico Racecourse, Winooka won the Pimlico Baltimore Handicap and the Autumn Handicap.

Winooka's final race was the 1935 Doncaster Handicap with jockey Jim Pike. During the race, he was galloped on and both his hind tendons were cut. He subsequently recovered and was retired to stud in New South Wales.

Winooka's total results are as follows:

| Placings | Australian Races | American Races |
|---|---|---|
| 1st Place | 11 | 4 |
| 2nd Place | 6 | 1 |
| 3rd Place | 5 | 1 |
| Total Starts | 30 | 9 |

== Image gallery ==
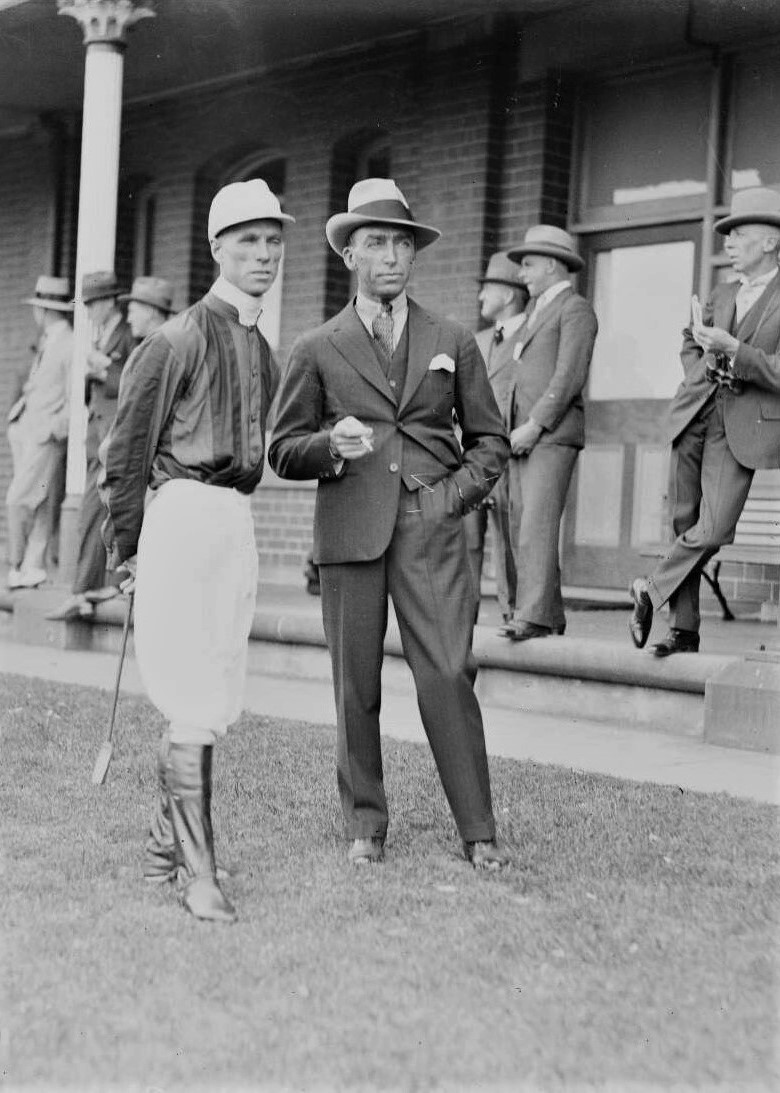
Mick Polson & Jim Pike jockey.

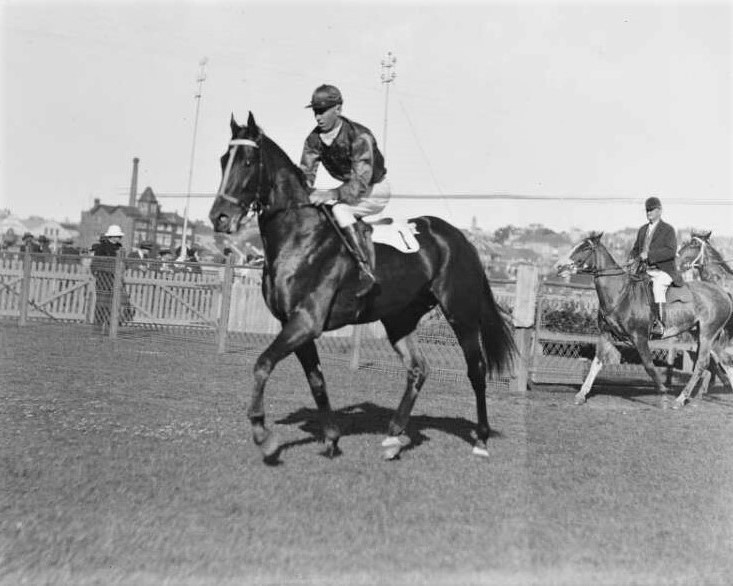
Winooka and jockey Stan Davidson Randwick Racecourse.

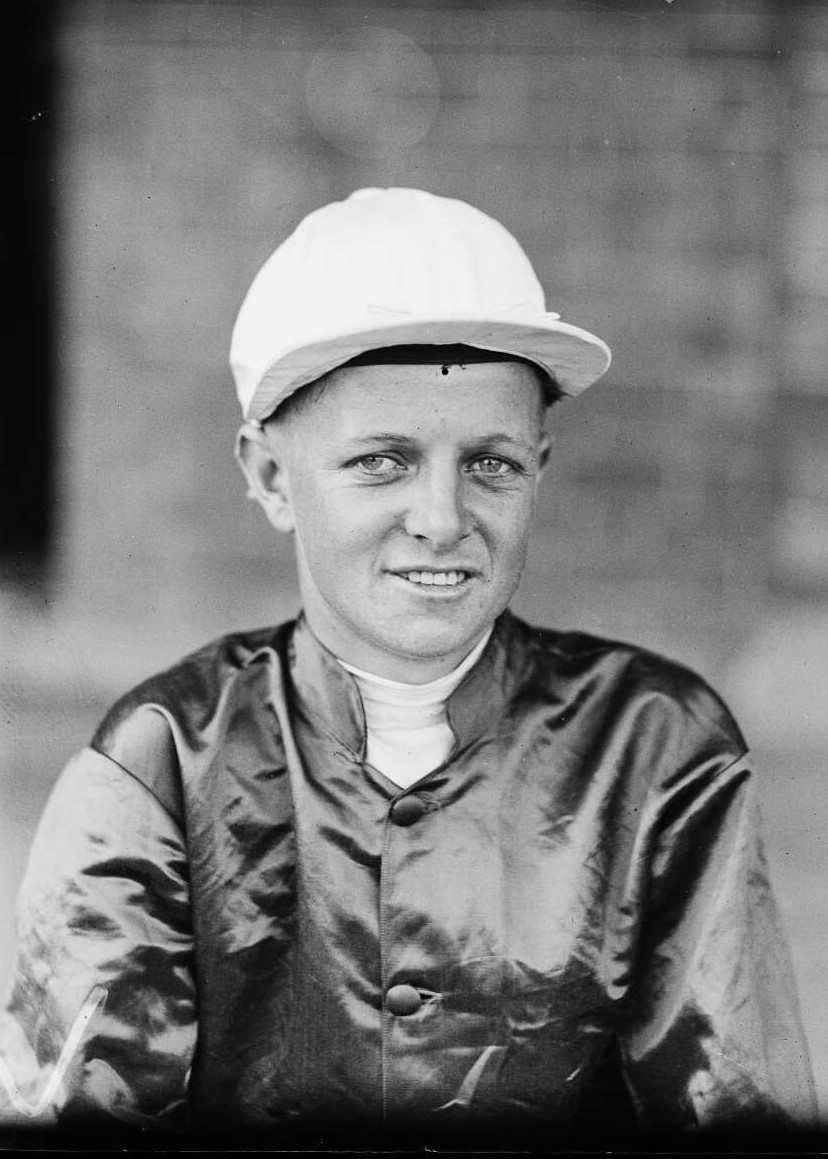
Edgar Britt Jockey.

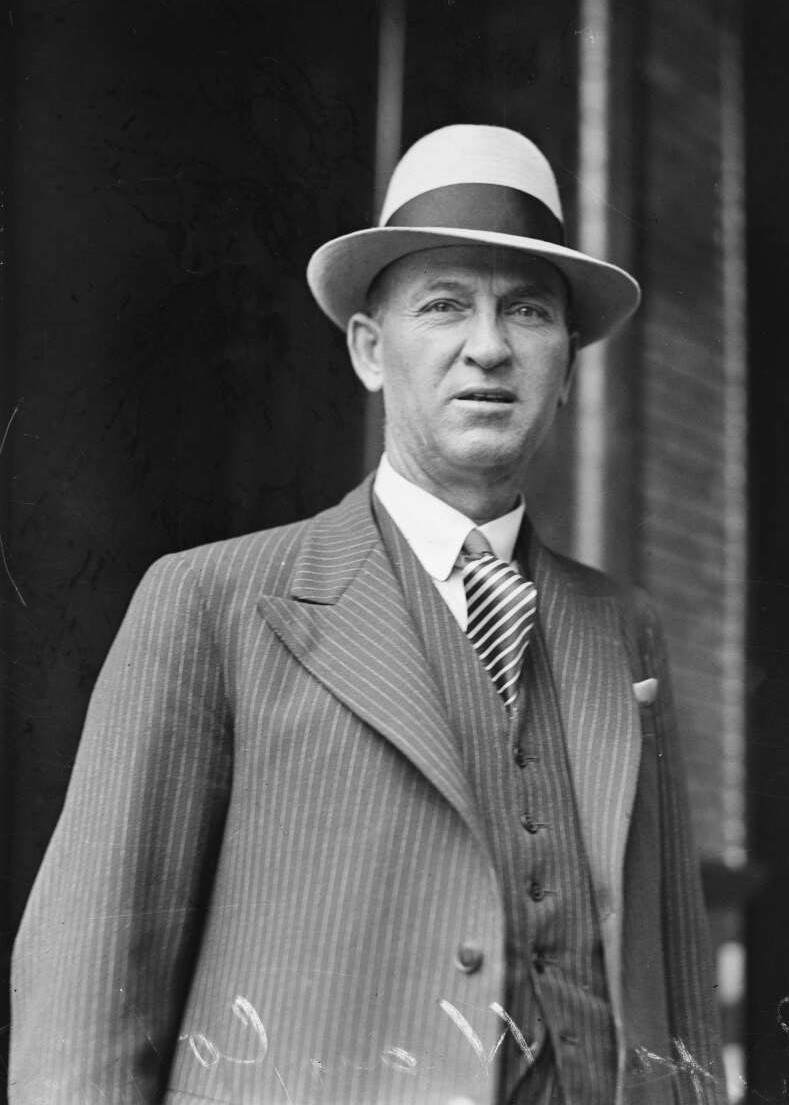
Rufe Naylor sporting entrepreneur.

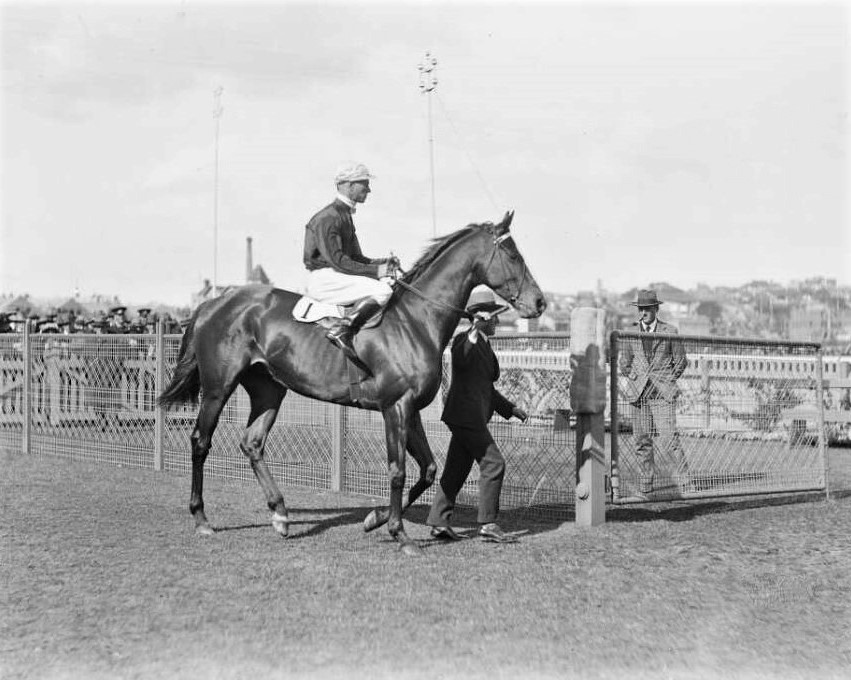
Fuji San and Jim Pike 1926 Tramway Handicap Randwick Racecourse.

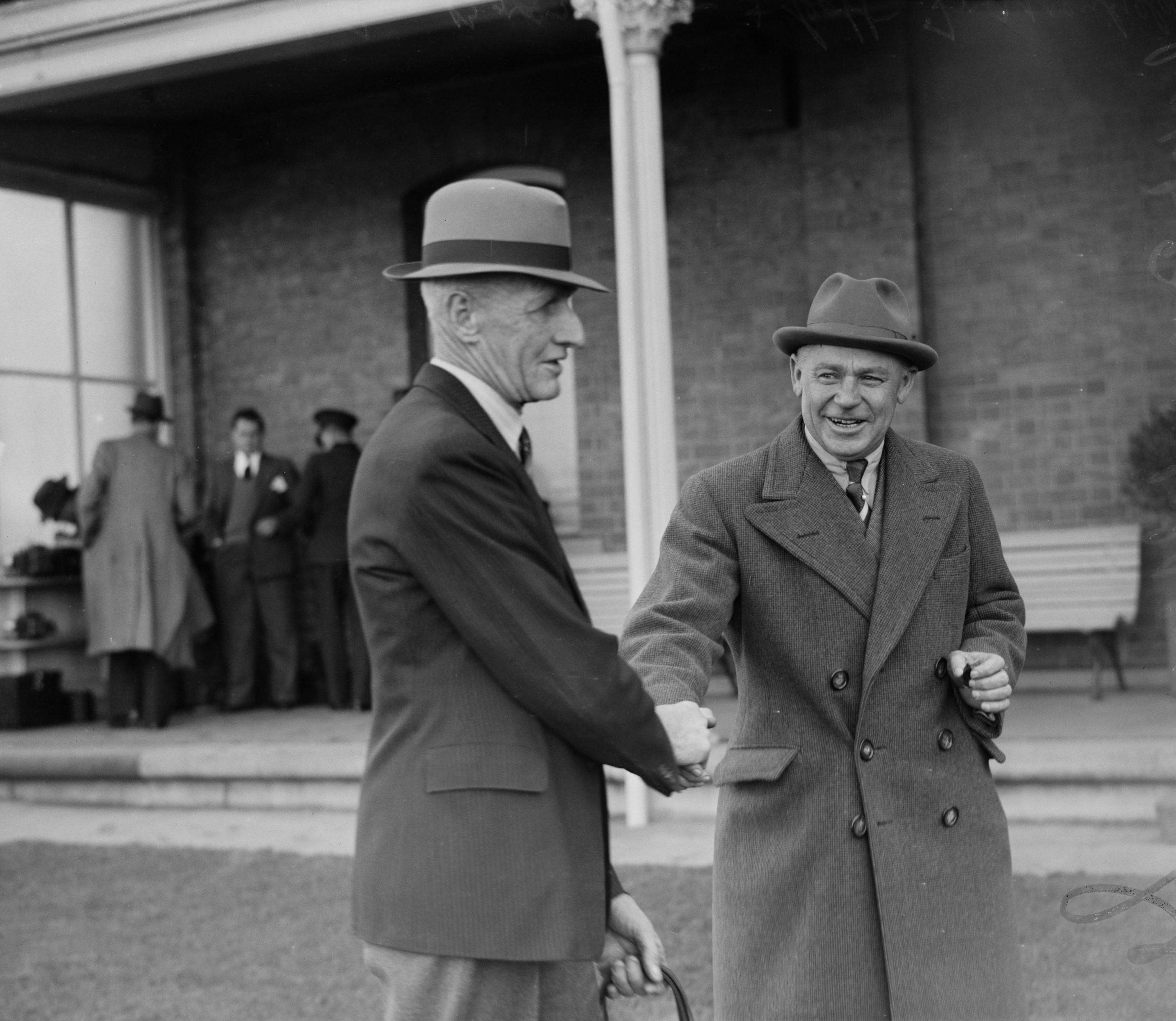
Tim Brosnan trainer (left) Randwick Racecourse.

== 1933 racebooks ==
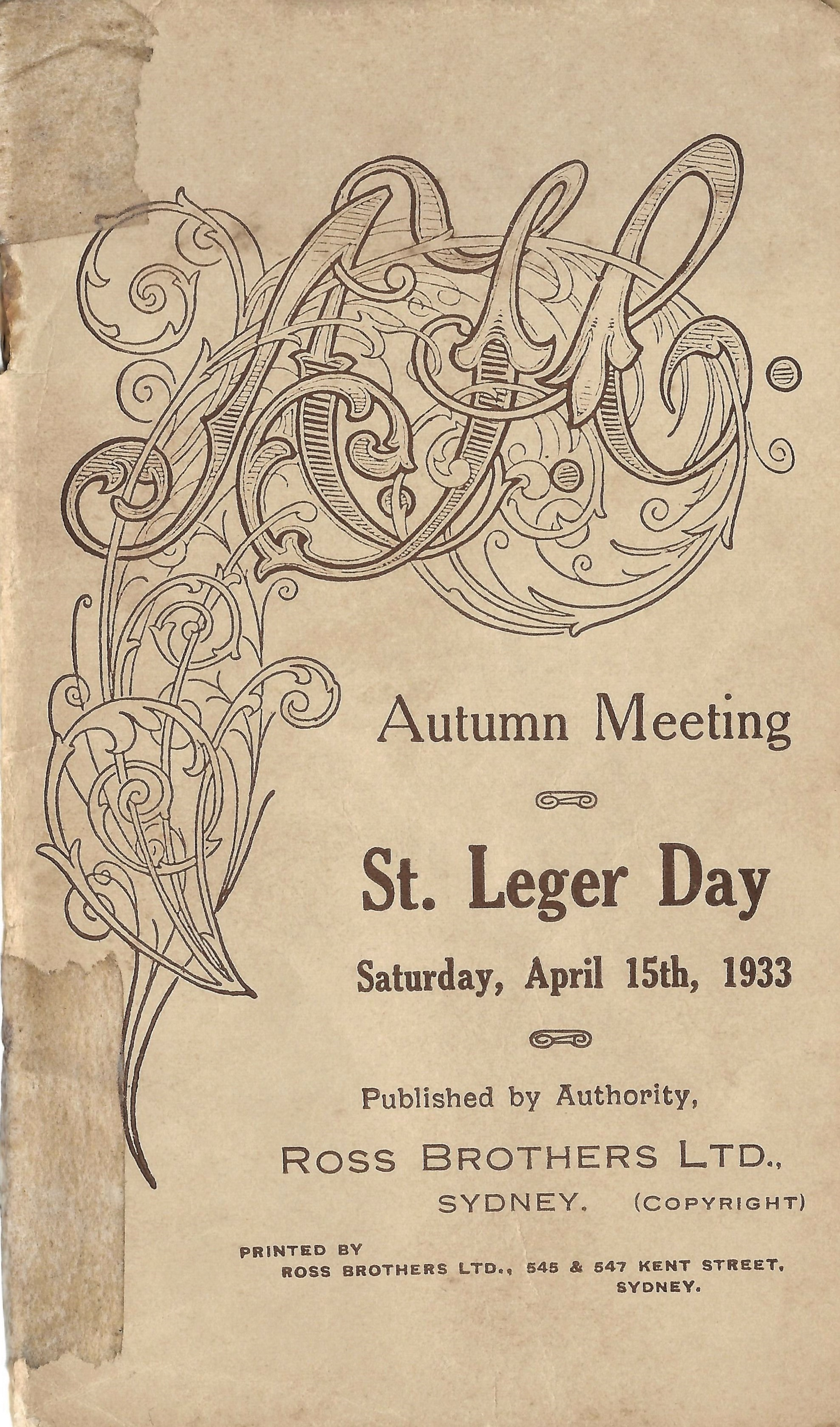
1933 AJC St Leger racebook front cover

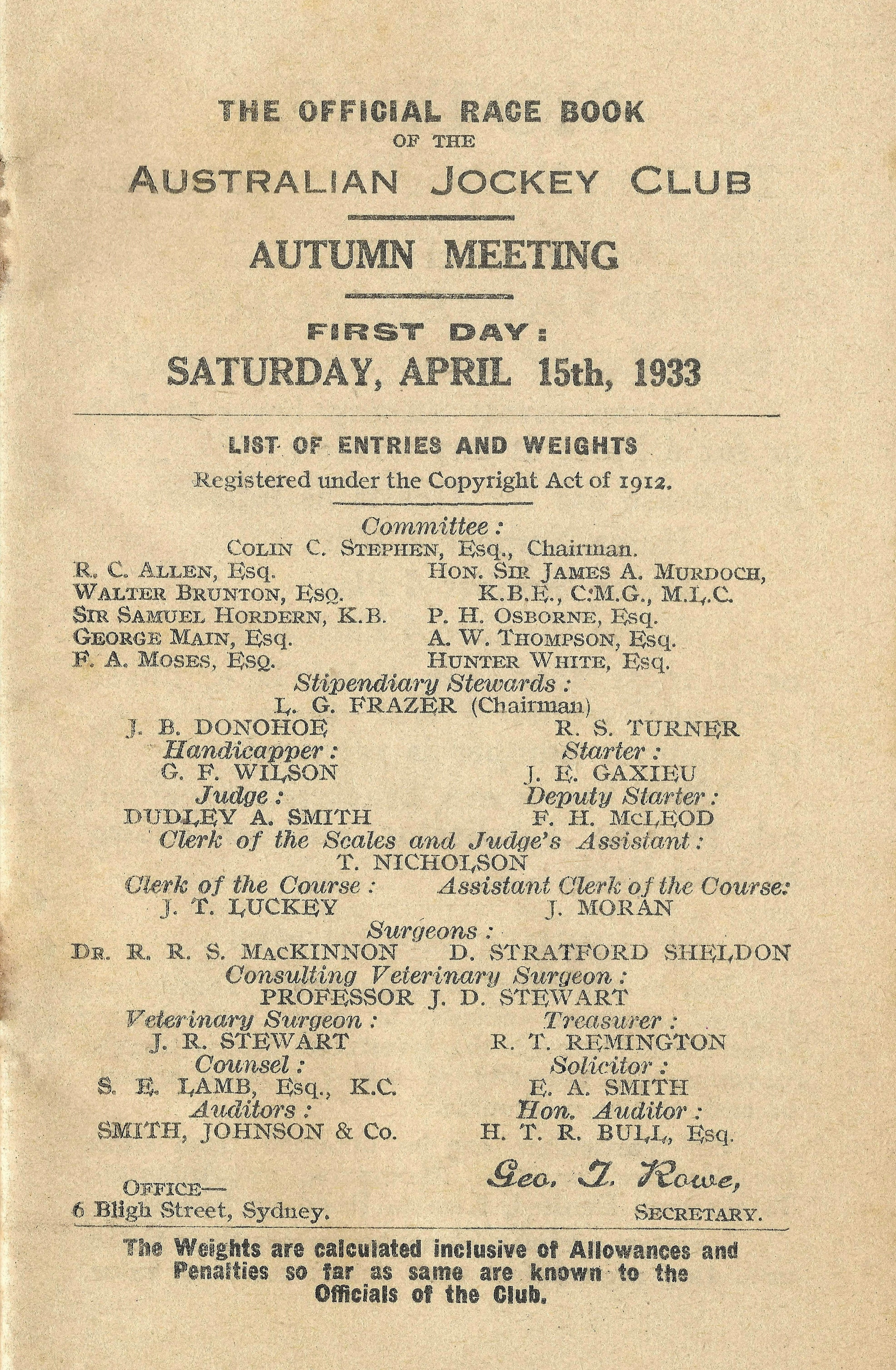
1933 AJC St Leger racebook inside cover showing raceday officials

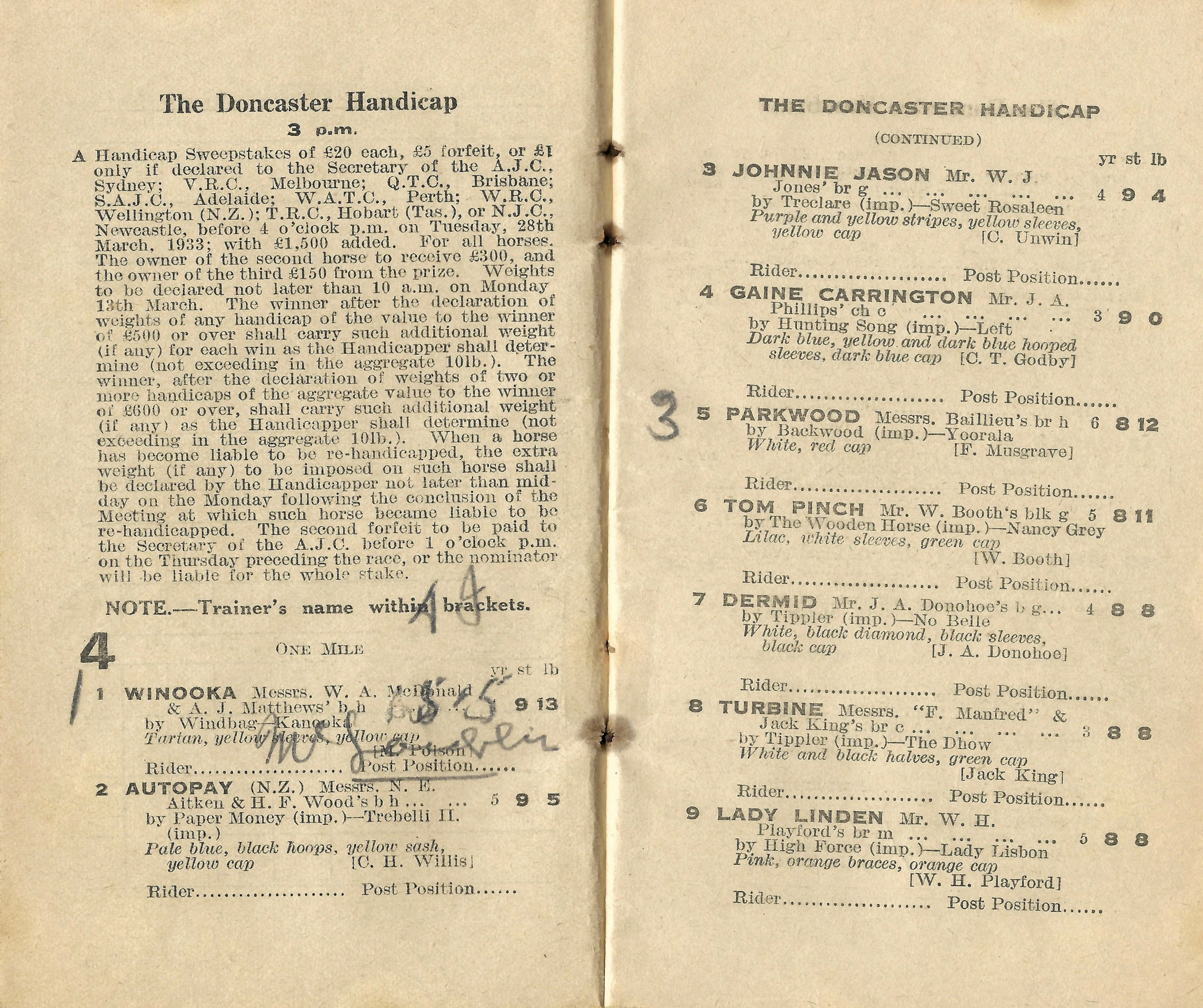
1933 AJC Doncaster Handicap page showing the winner, Winooka

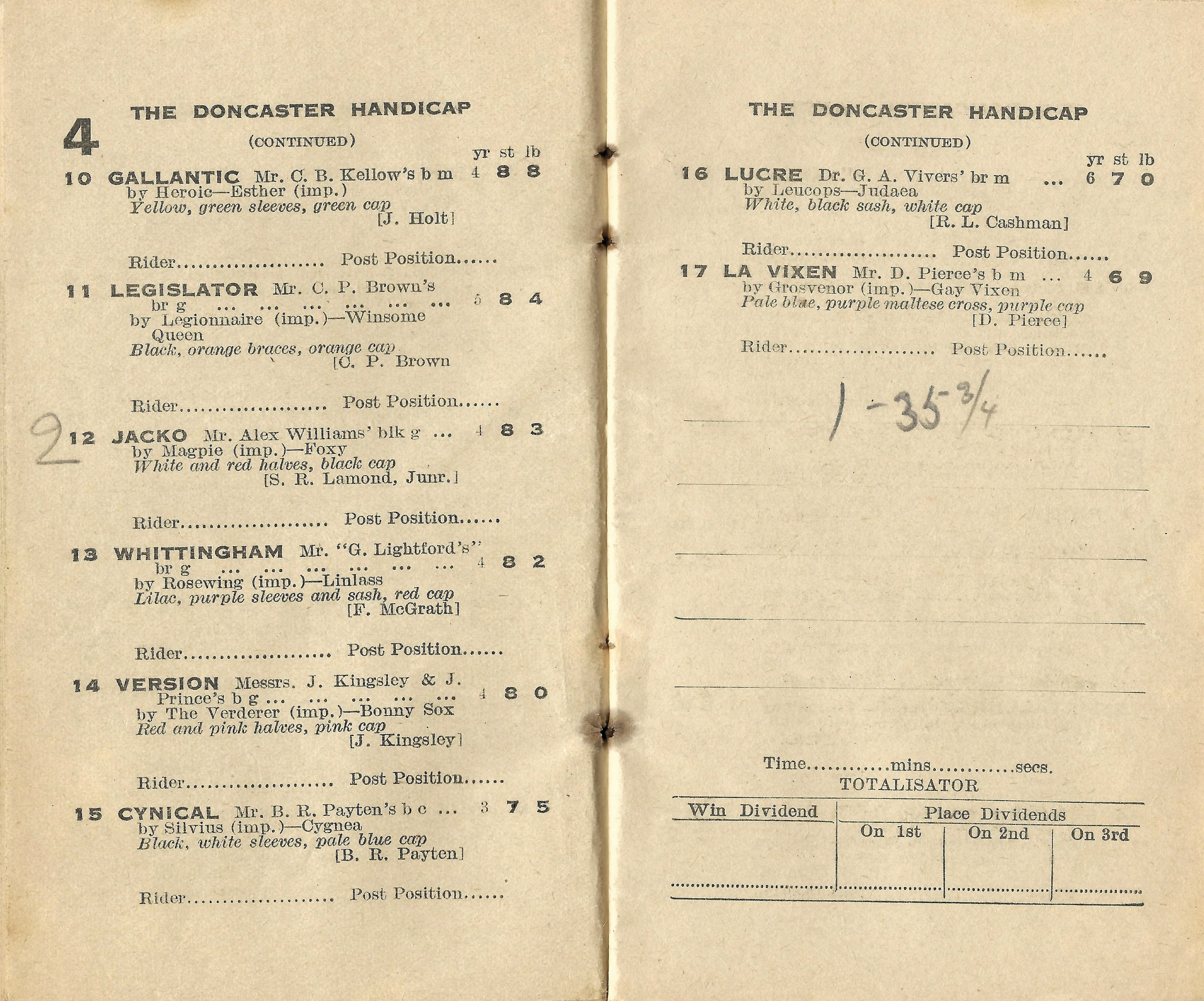
1933 AJC Doncaster Handicap starters and results

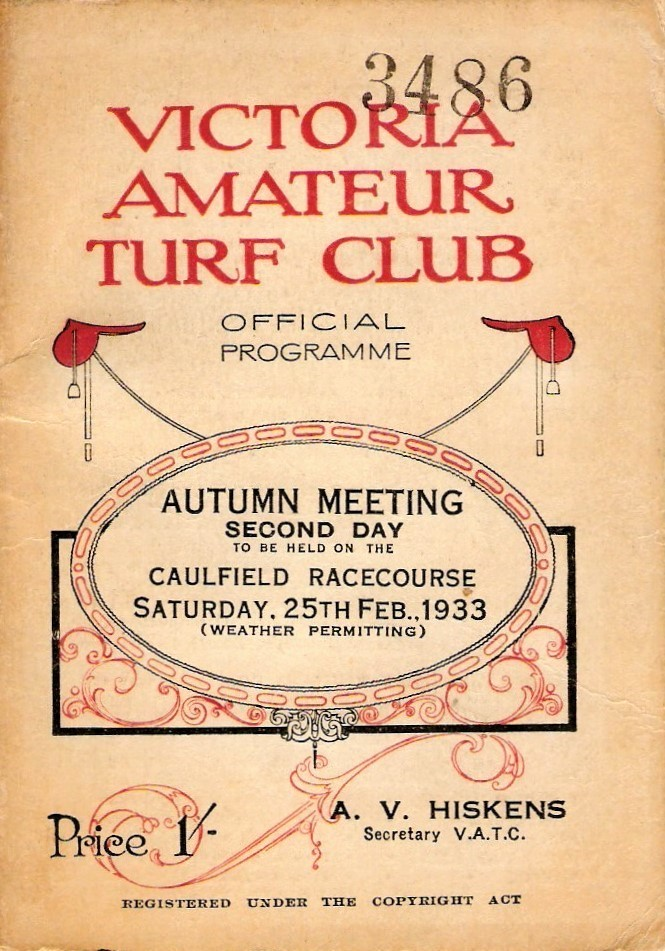
1933 VATC Futurity Stakes racebook front cover

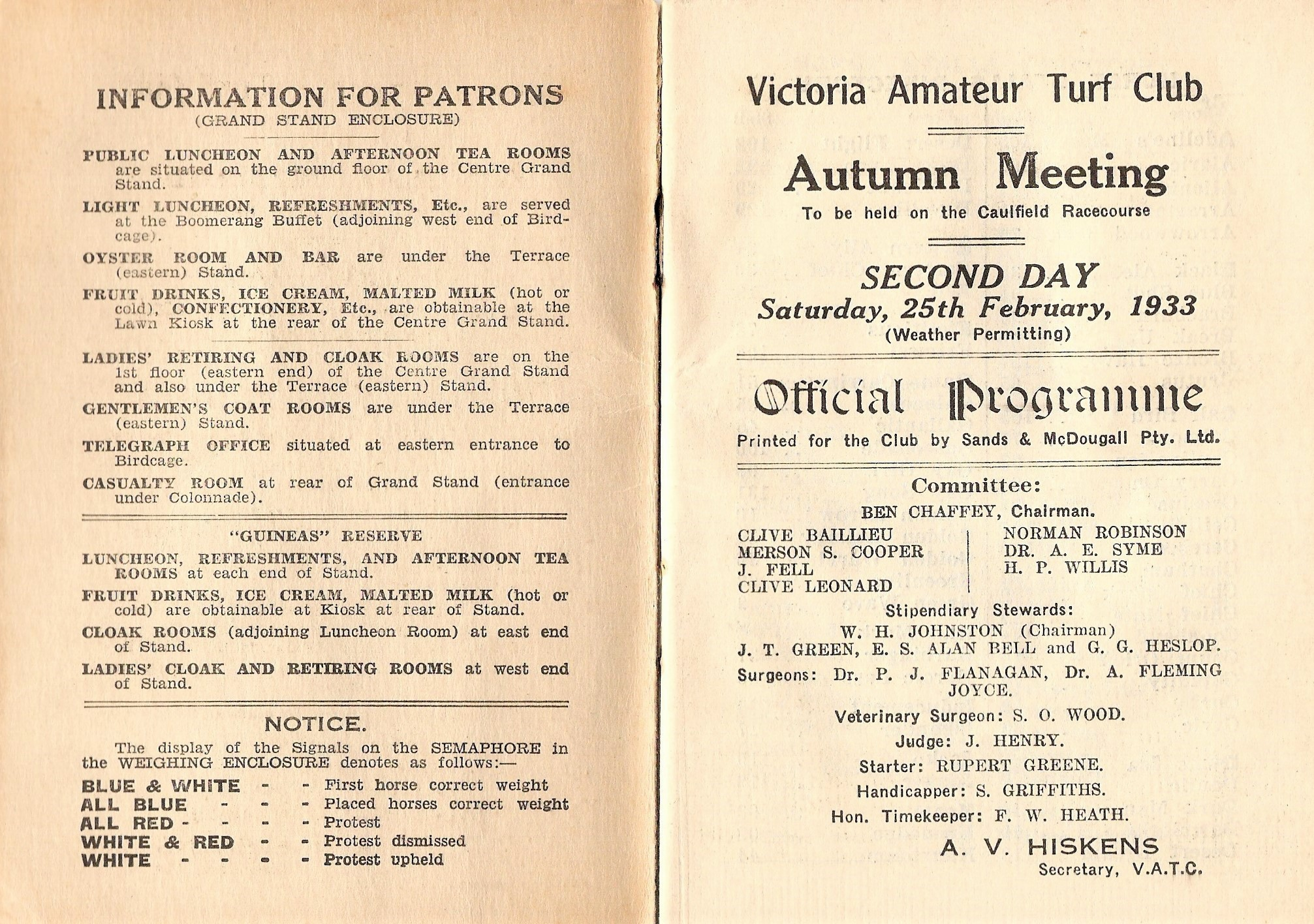
1933 VATC Futurity Stakes raceday officials & information for patrons

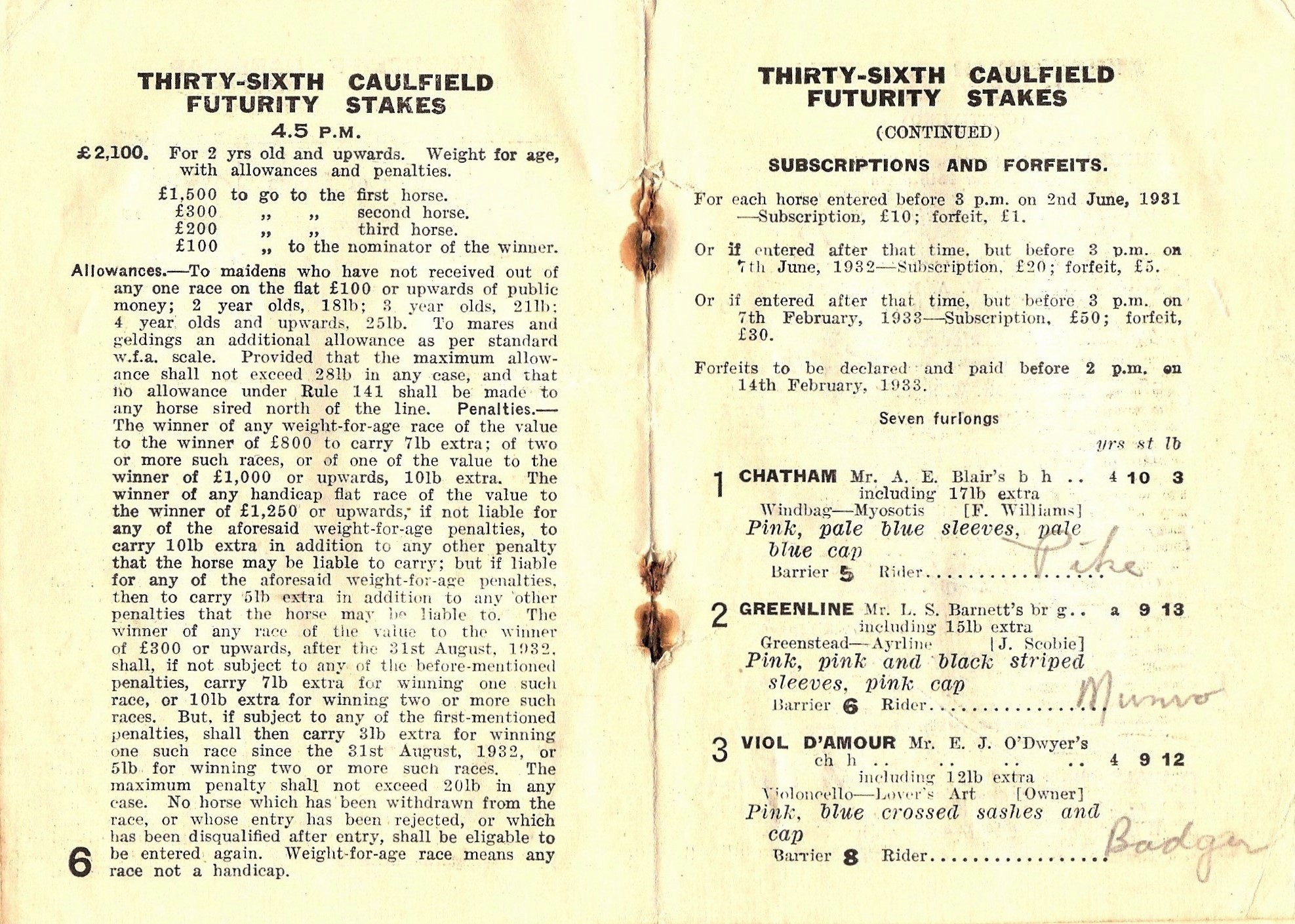
1933 VATC Futurity Stakes conditions and results

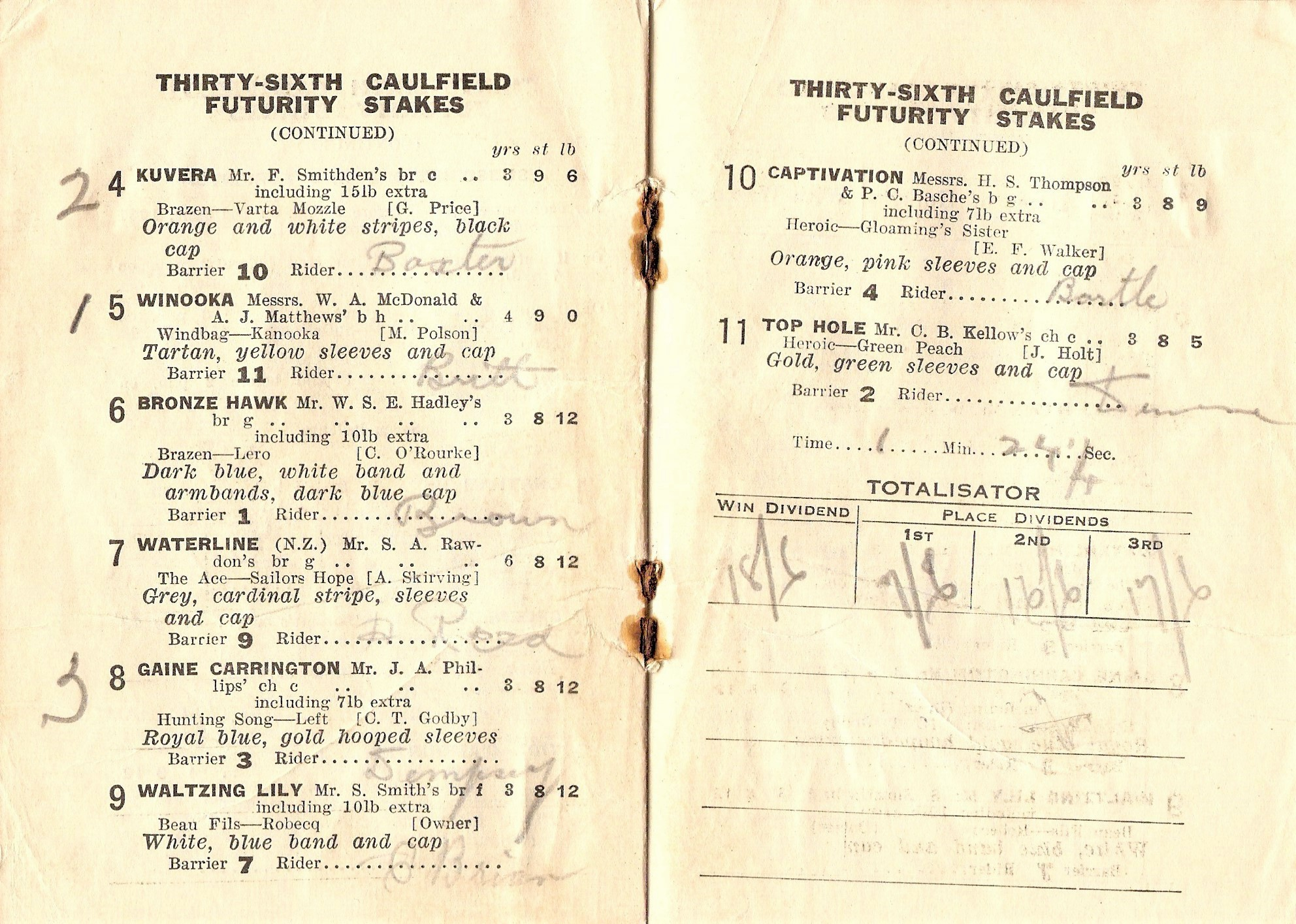
1933 VATC Futurity Stakes showing the winner, Winooka
