= Futurity Stakes (MRC) =

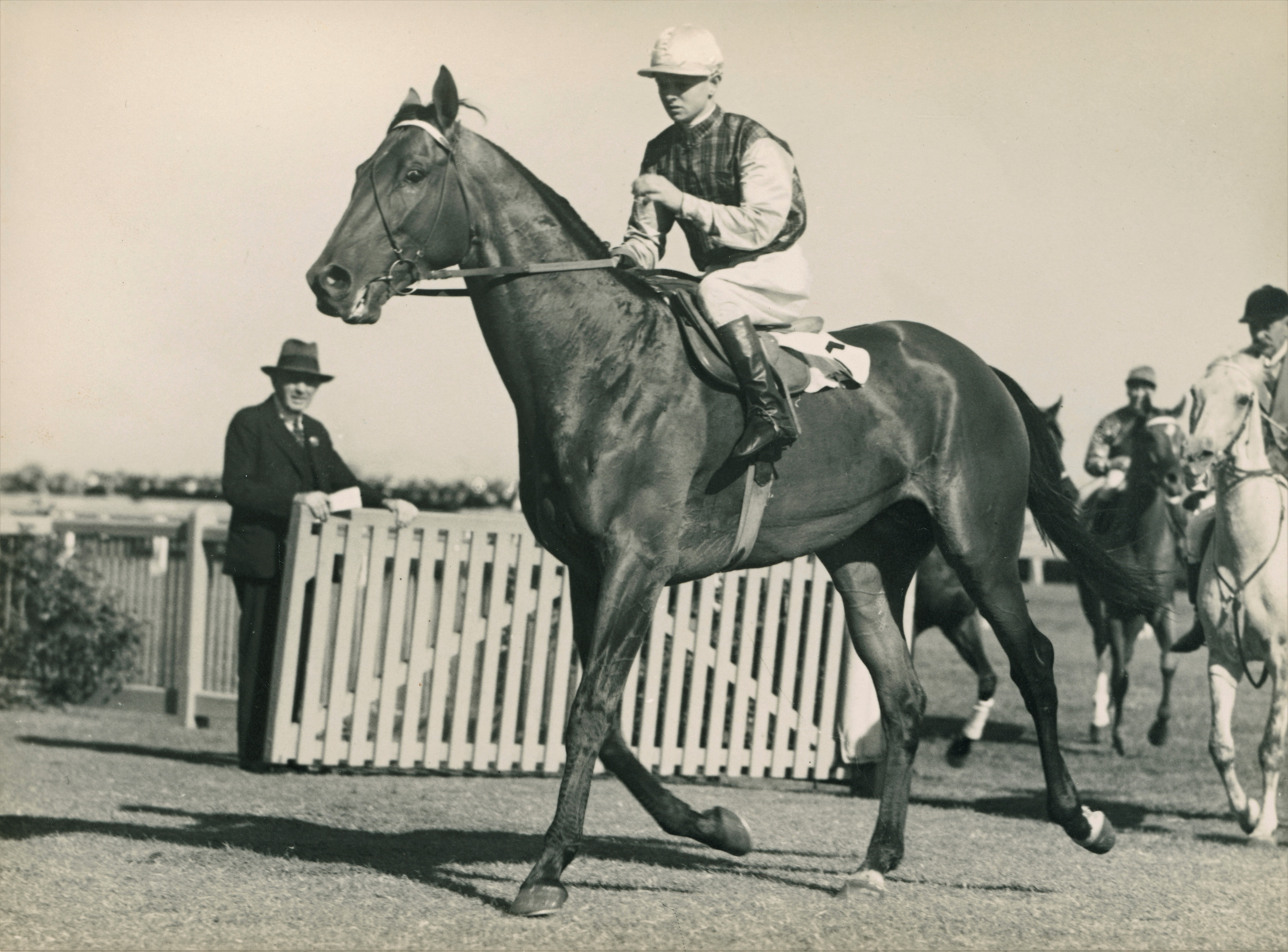
- Winooka & Edgar Britt, 1933 winner
- Class: Group 1
- Location: Caulfield Racecourse
- Inaugurated: 1897
- Race type: Thoroughbred
- Sponsor: Henley Homes (2026)

Race information
- Distance: 1,400 metres
- Surface: Turf
- Track: Left-handed
- Qualification: Three years old and older that are not maidens
- Weight: Weight-for-age
- Purse: A$750,000 (2026)

The Futurity Stakes is a Melbourne Racing Club Group 1 weight-for-age Thoroughbred horse race for horses three years old and older, over a distance of 1400 metres held at Caulfield Racecourse in Melbourne, Australia, in February.

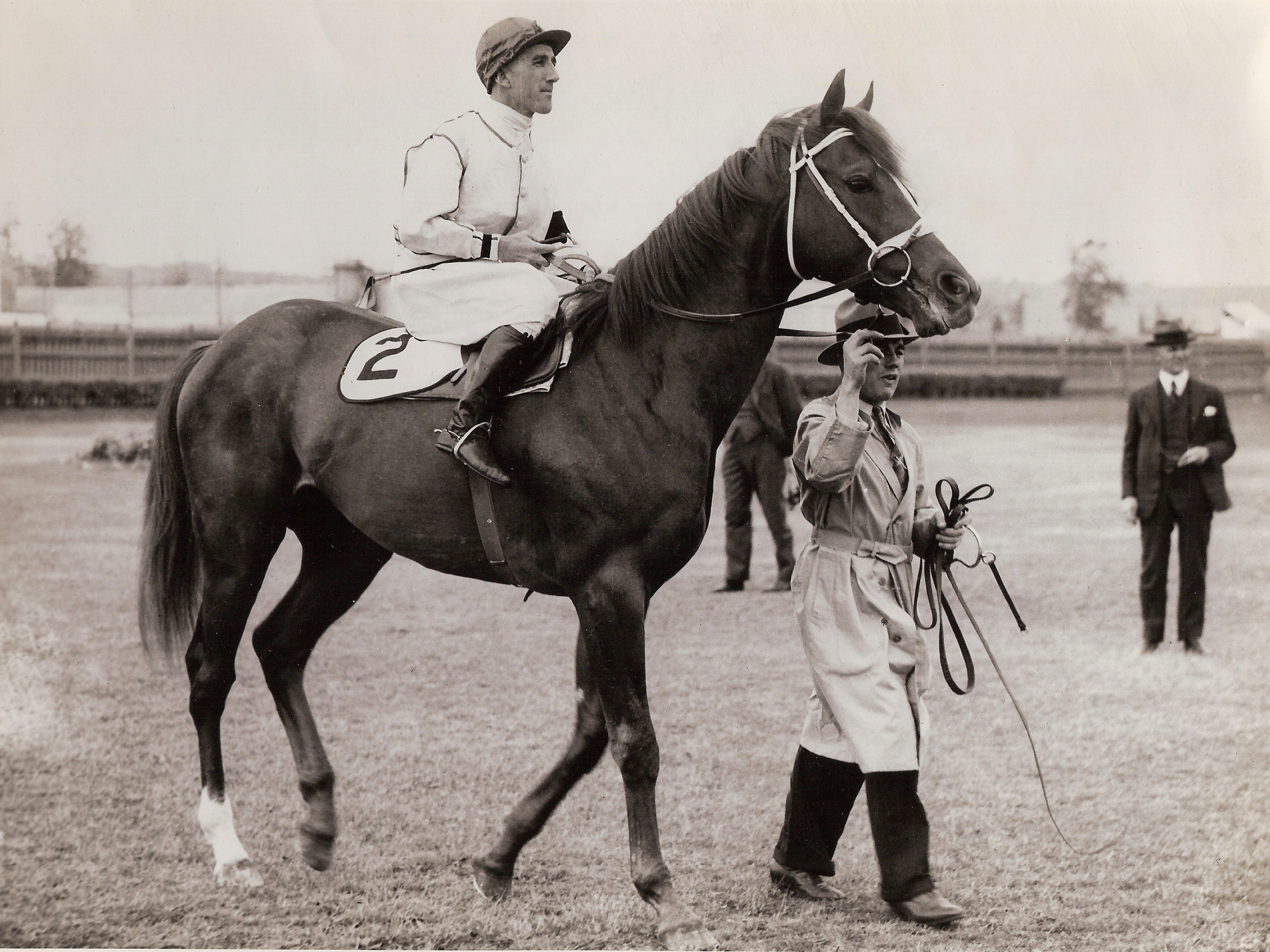
Ajax, 1938, 1939, 1940 winner

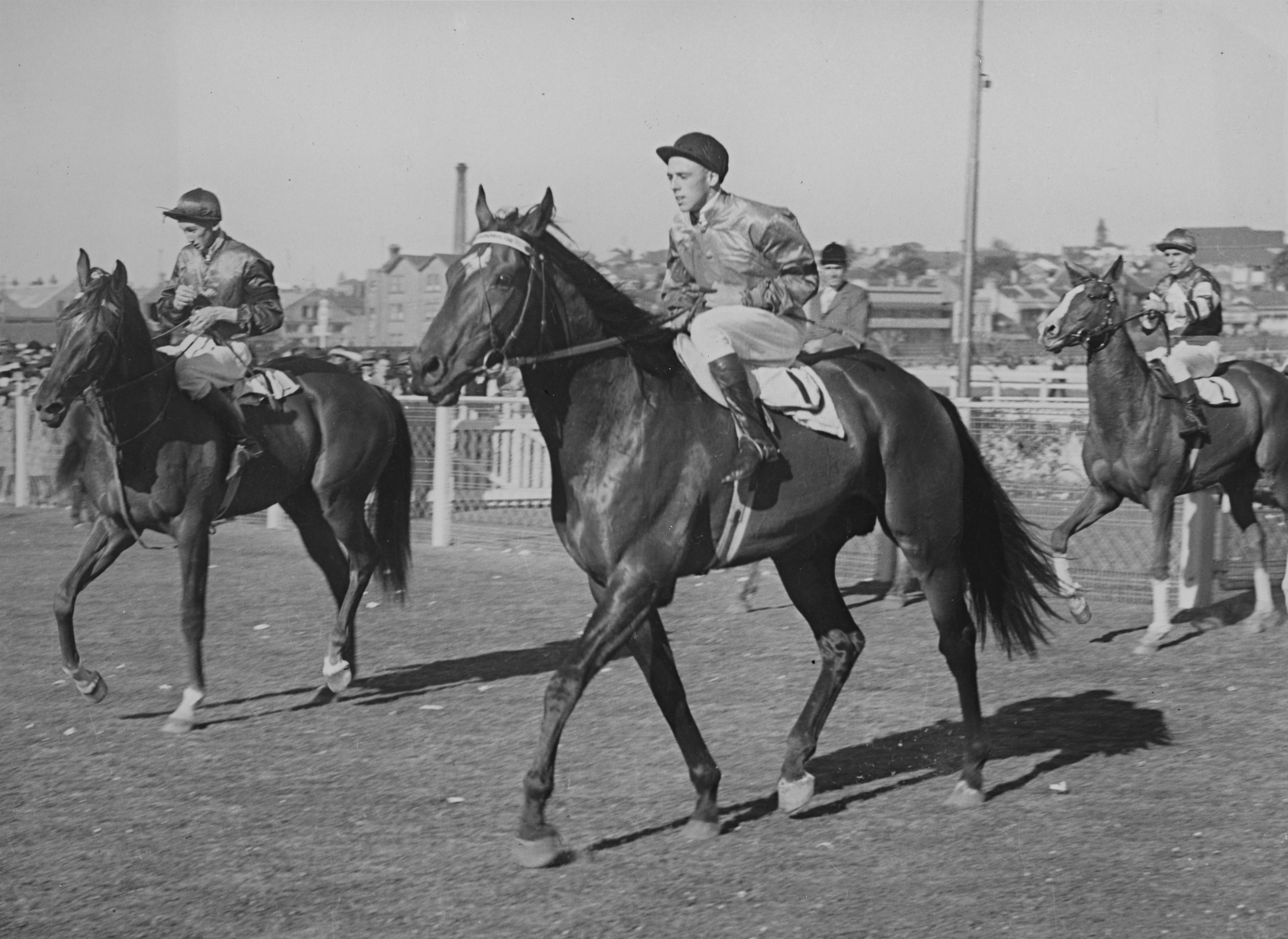
Bernborough, 1946 winner

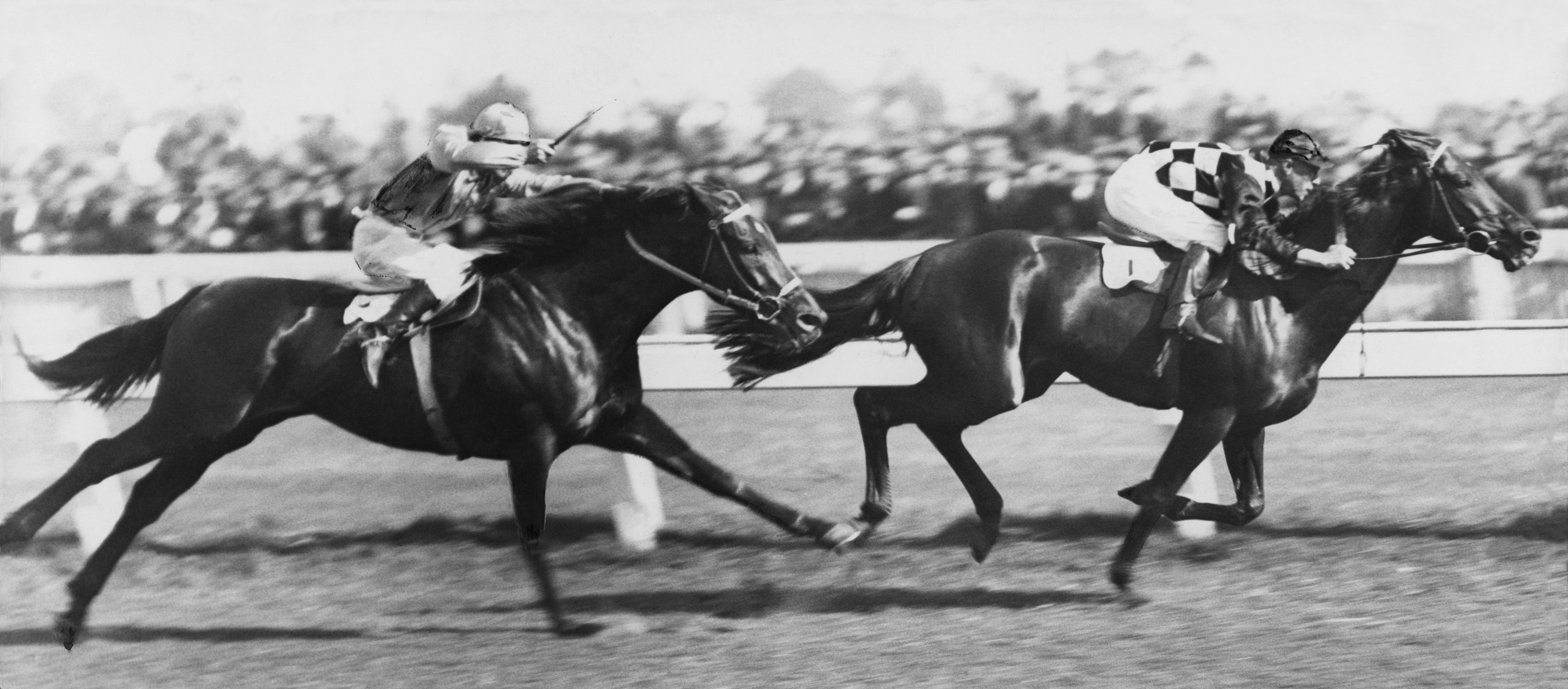
Gothic, 1928 winner

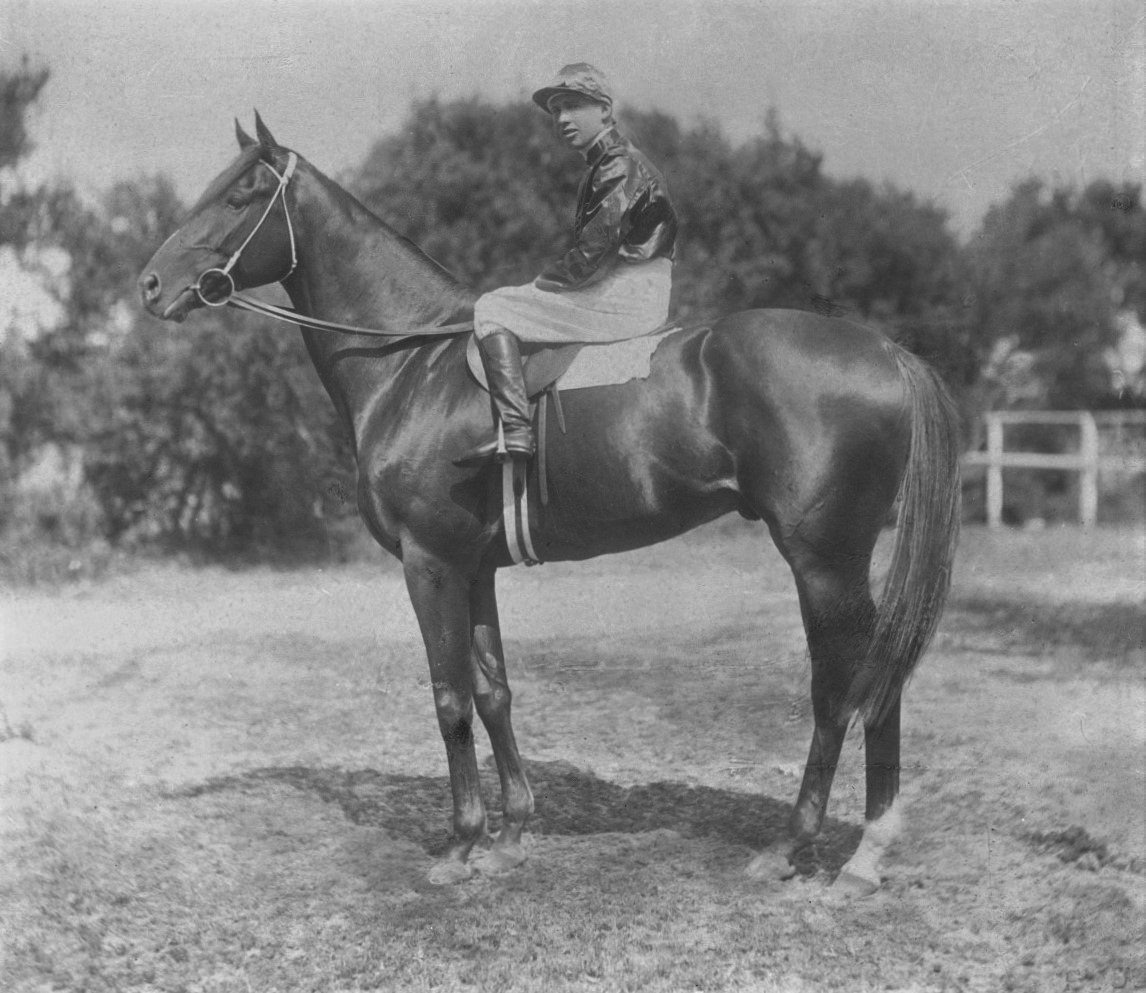
Eurythmic, 1922 winner

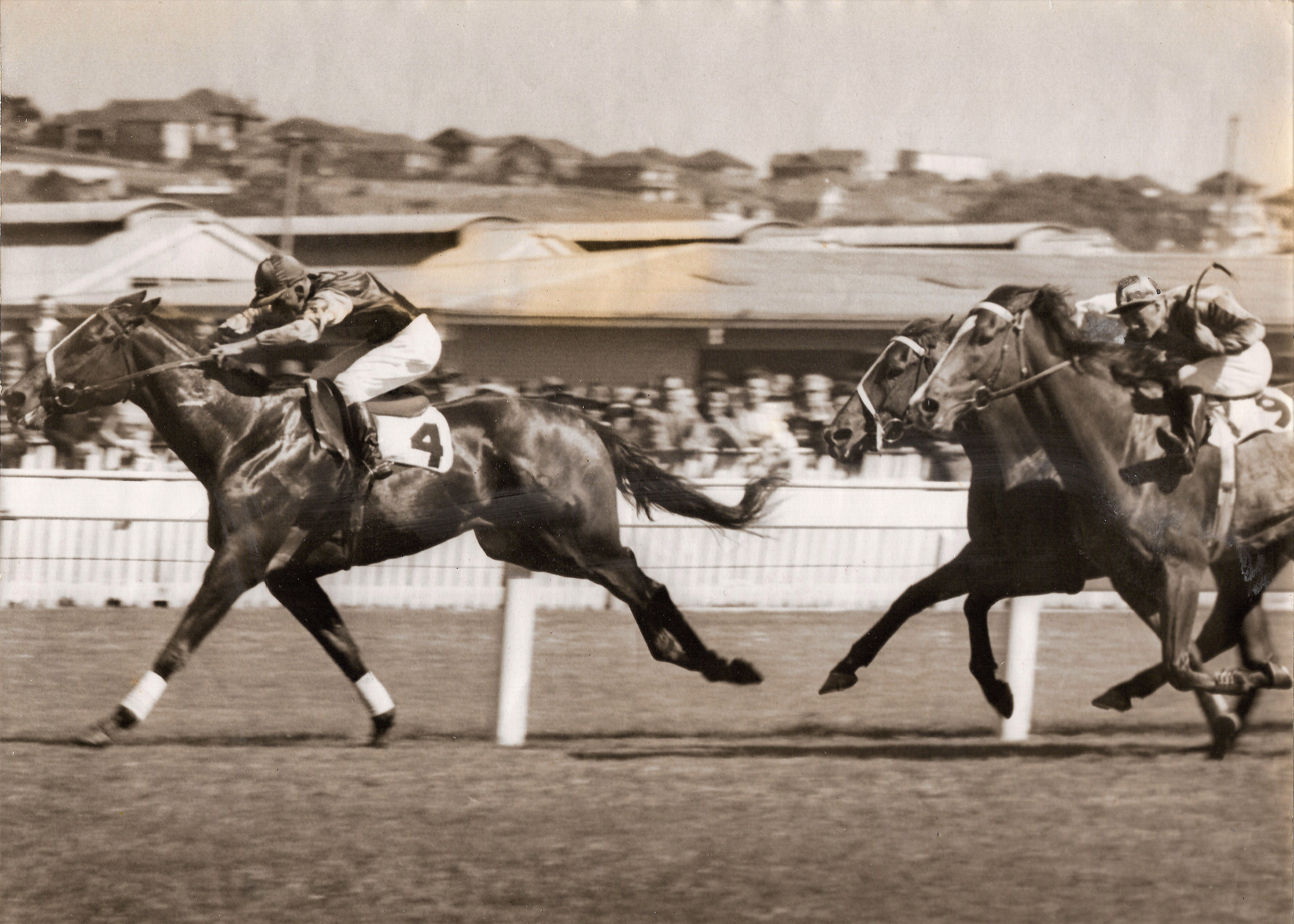
San Domenico, 1952 winner

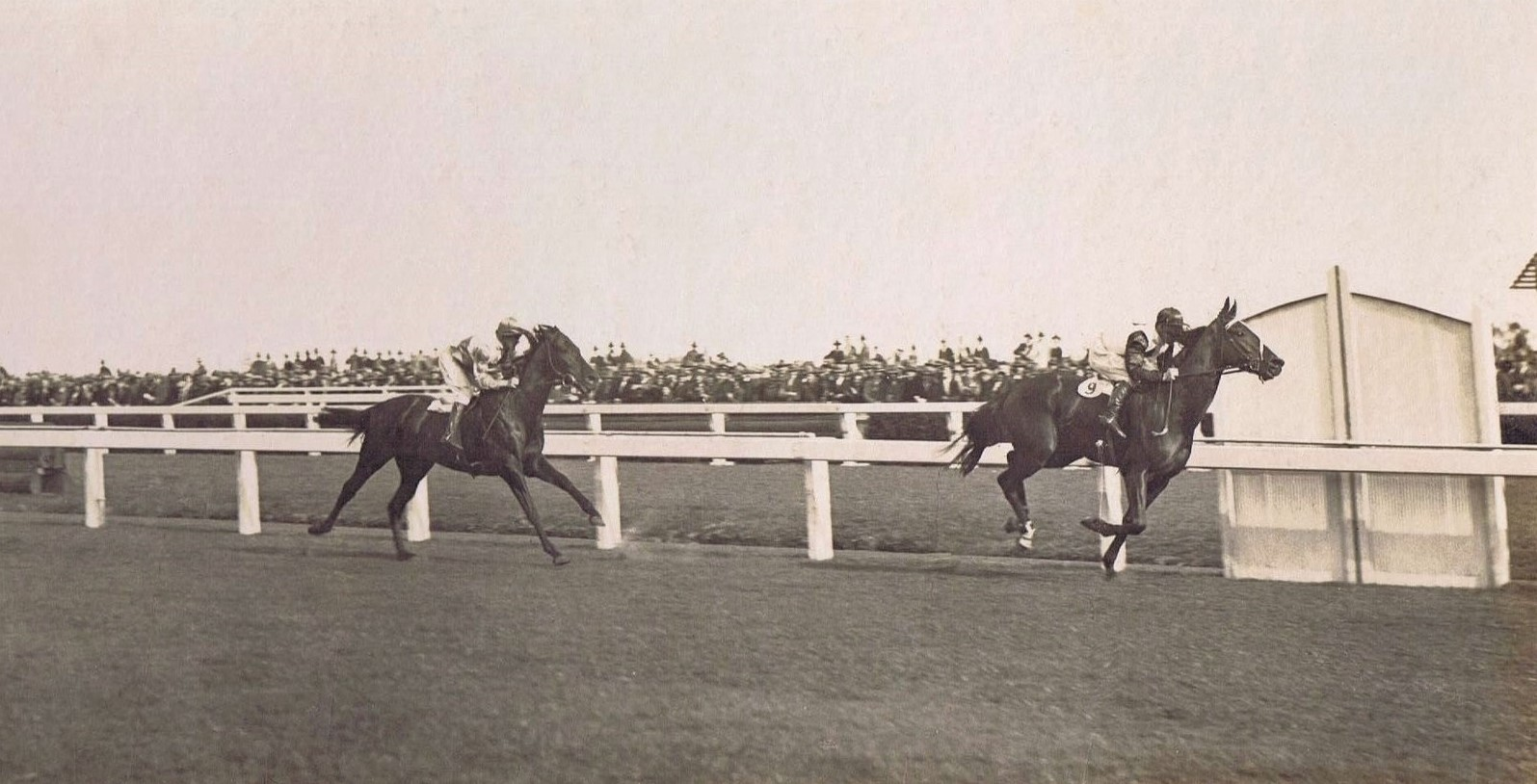
Ammon Ra, 1932 winner

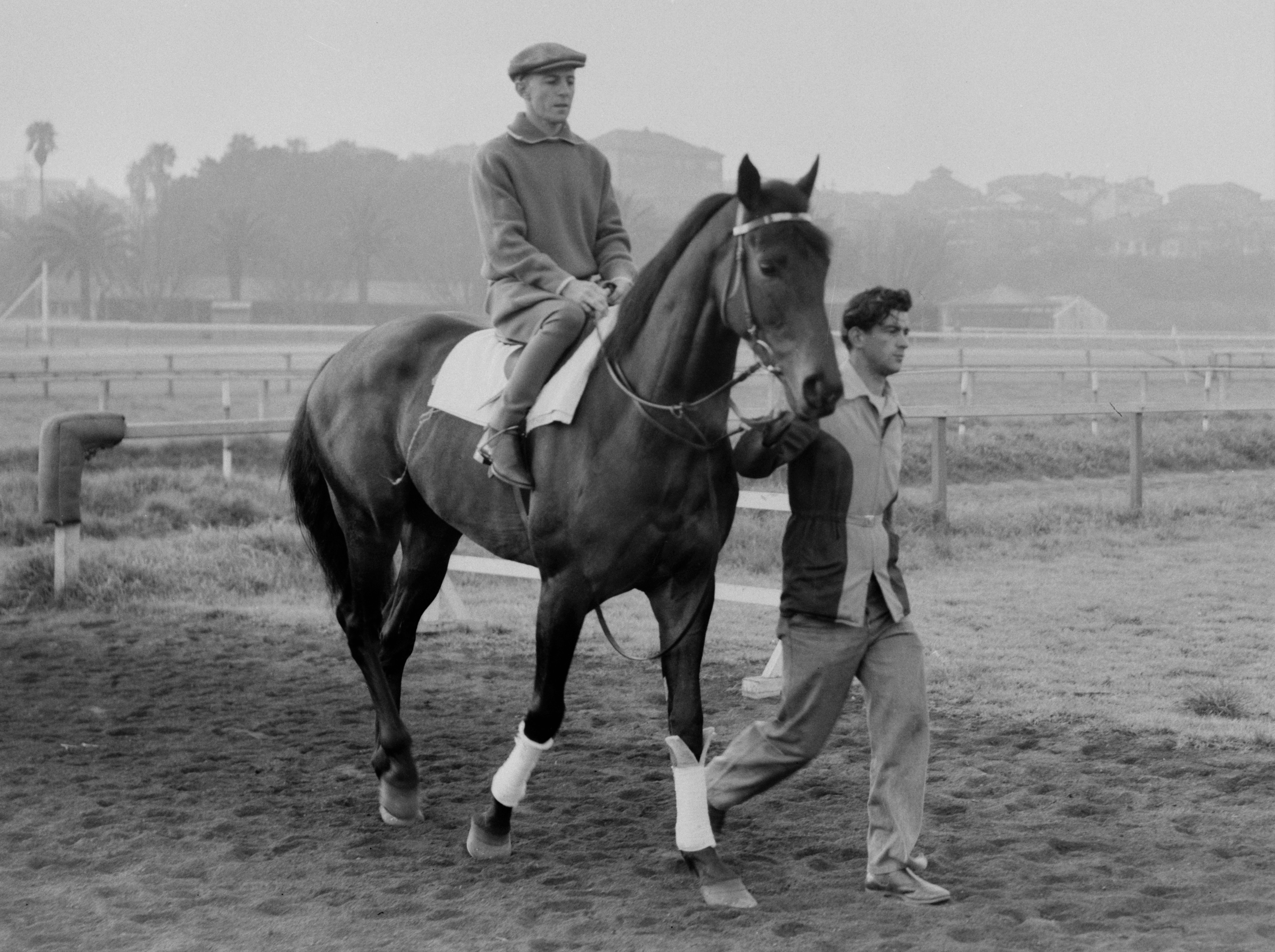
Prince Cortauld, 1955 winner

== History ==
From 2006 until 2010 it was the first leg of the Asian Mile Challenge series, and its distance was changed to 1600 metres (1 mile). The race distance was reverted in 2011.

=== Distance ===
- 1898–1972 - 7 furlongs (1408.176 metres)
- 1973–1978 – 1400 metres
- 1979 – 1800 metres
- 1989–1995 – 1400 metres
- 1996 – 1411 metres
- 1997–2005 – 1400 metres
- 2006–2010 – 1600 metres
- 2011 onwards - 1400 metres

=== Venue ===
During World War II the event was held at Flemington Racecourse. In 1996 the event was held at Flemington Racecourse due to reconstruction of Caulfield Racecourse. In 2023 the race was run at Sandown Racecourse.

=== 1933 and 1948 racebooks ===
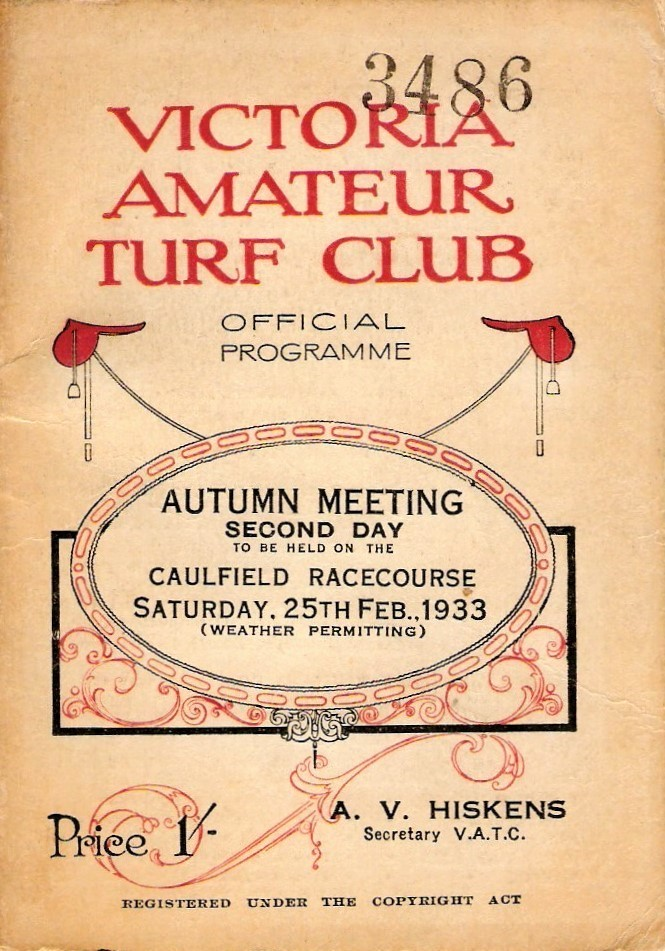
1933 VATC Futurity Stakes racebook front cover

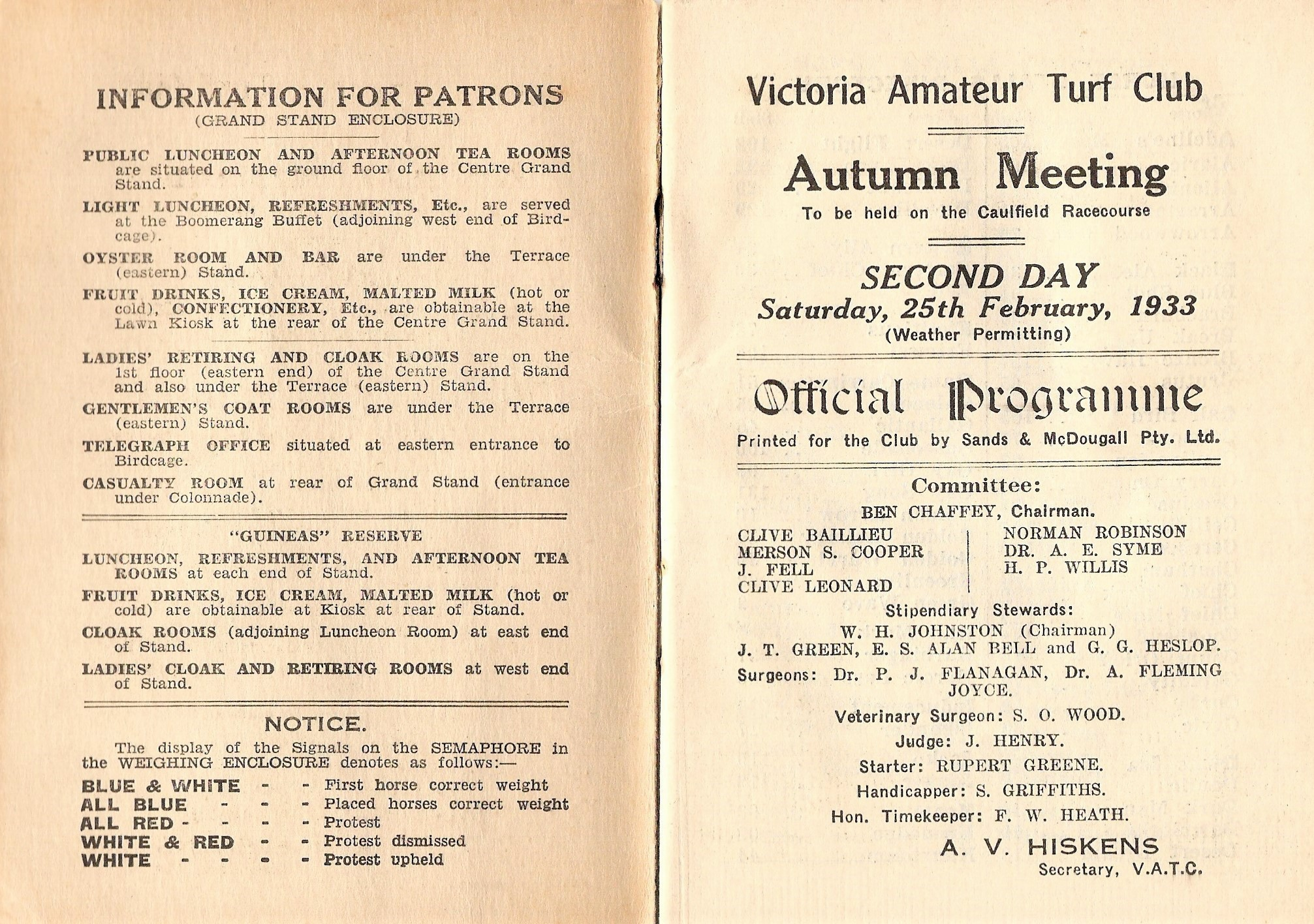
1933 VATC Futurity Stakes officials & information for patrons

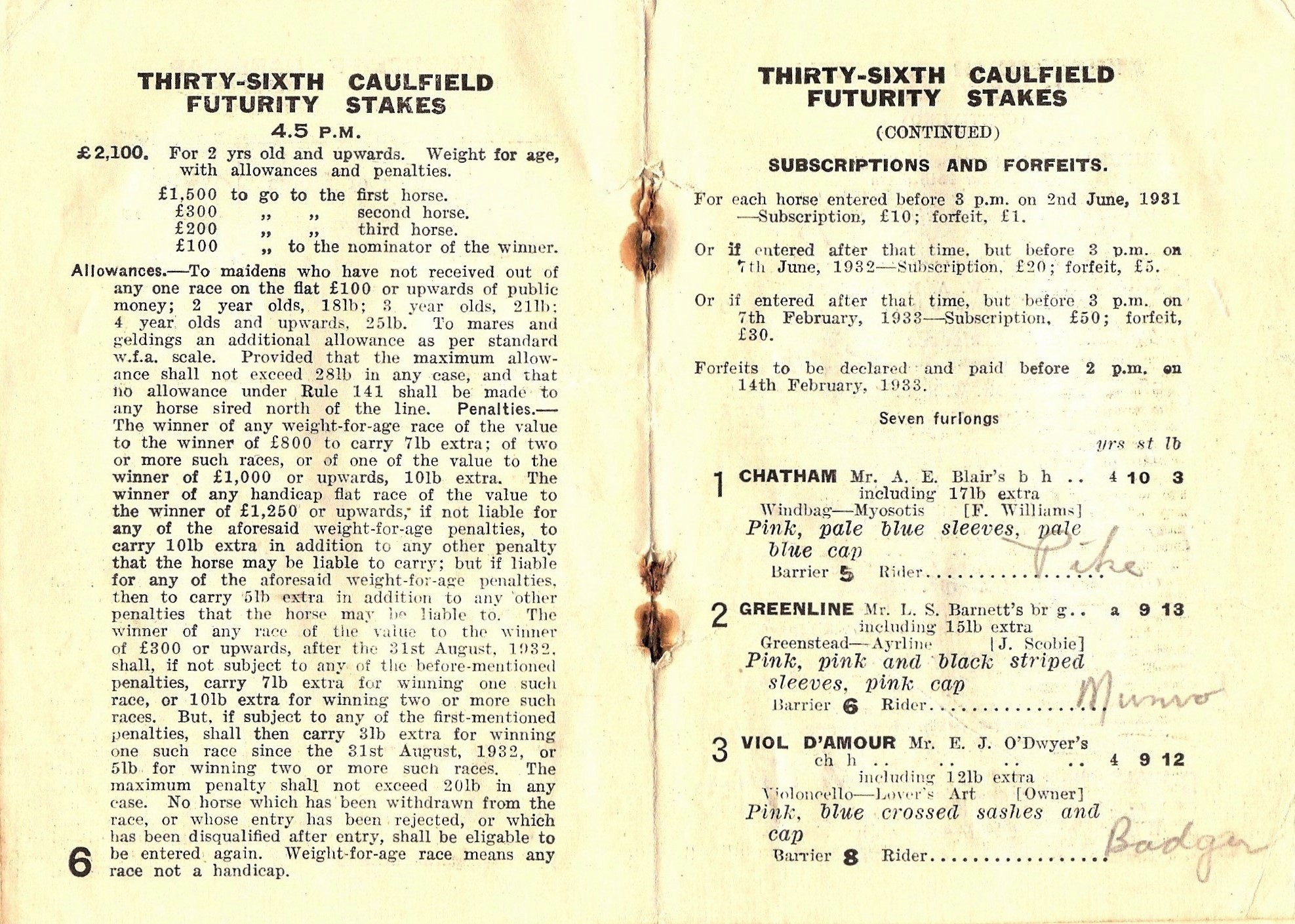
1933 VATC Futurity Stakes conditions and results

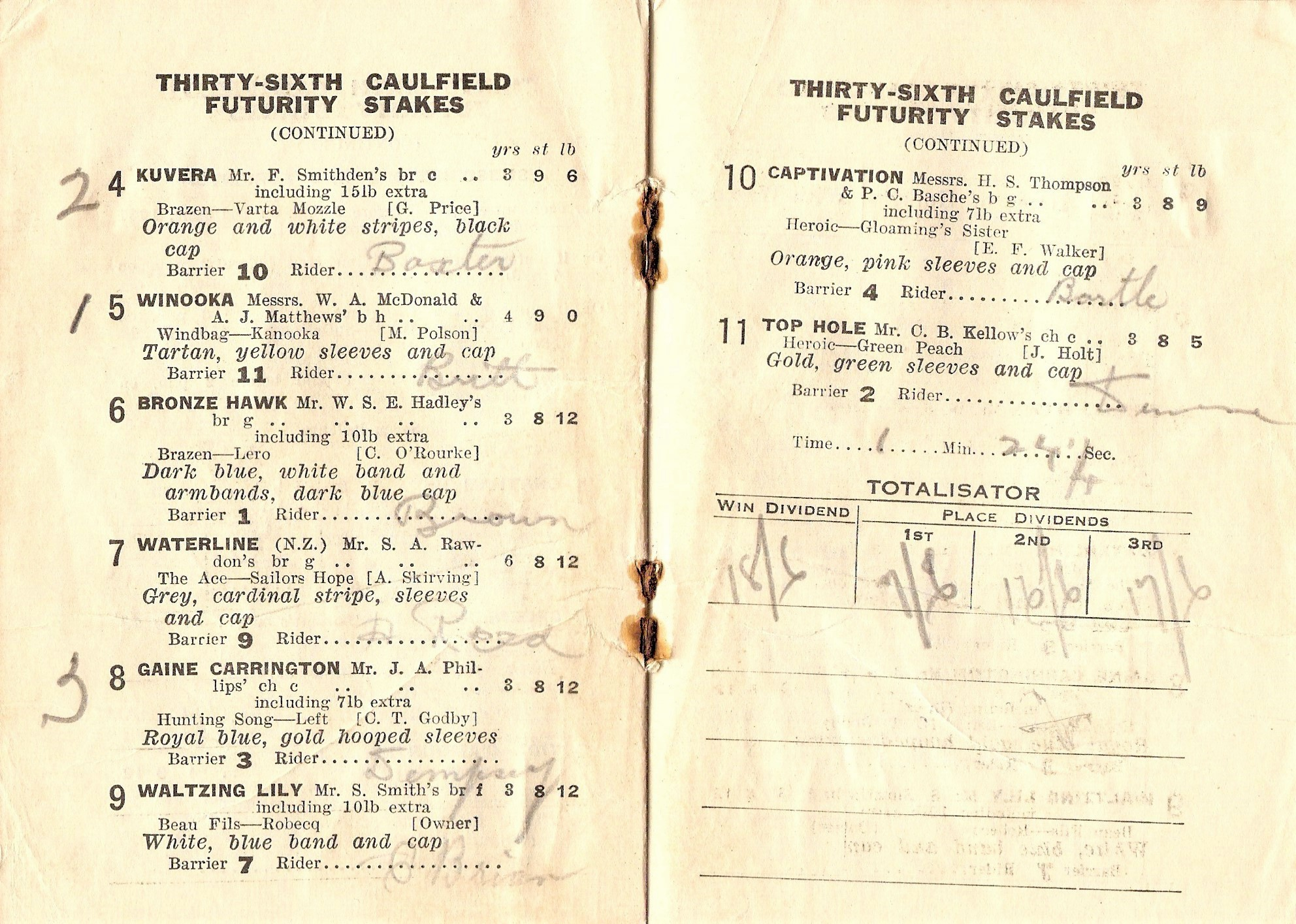
1933 VATC Futurity Stakes showing the winner, Winooka

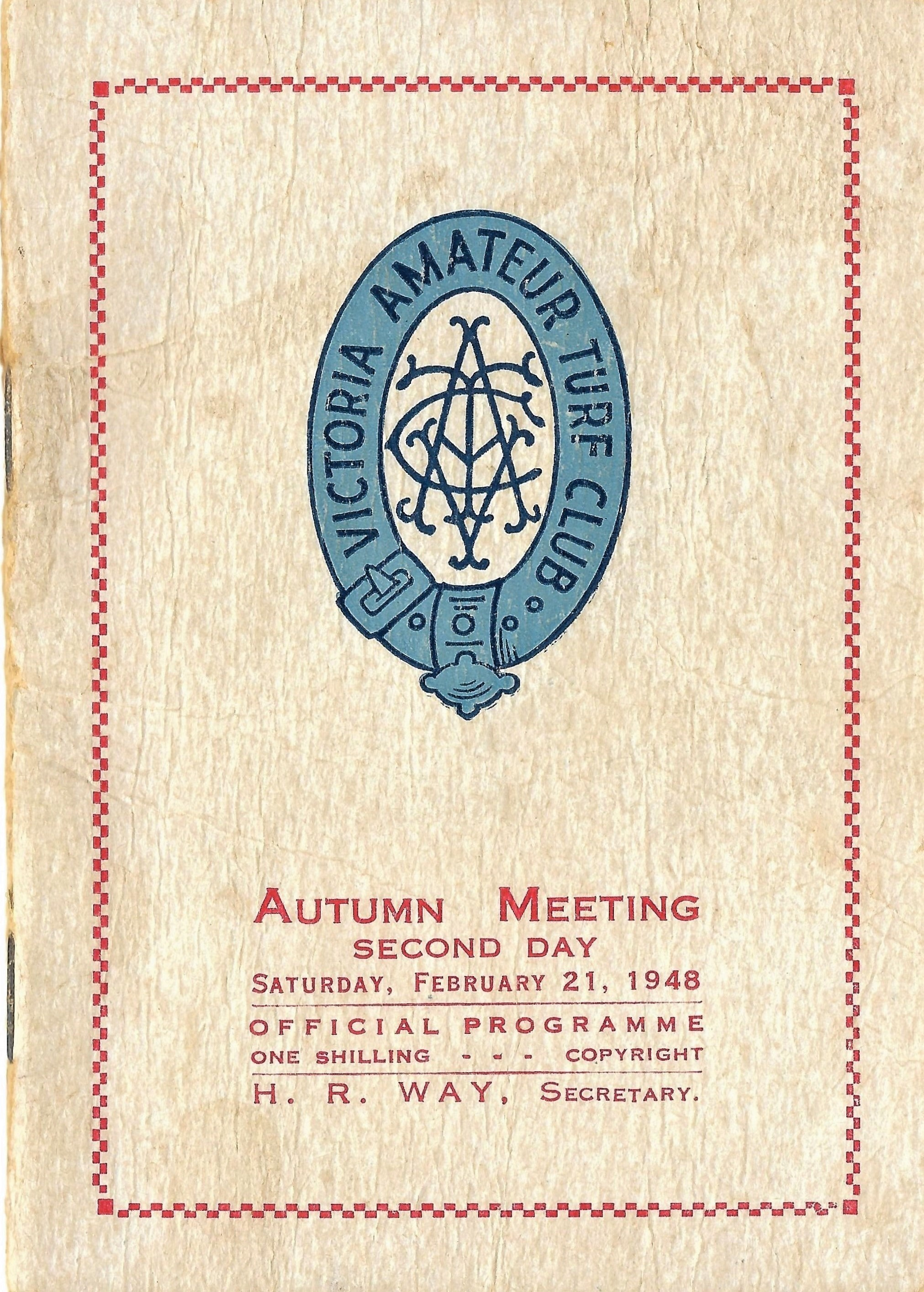
1948 VATC Futurity Stakes racebook front cover

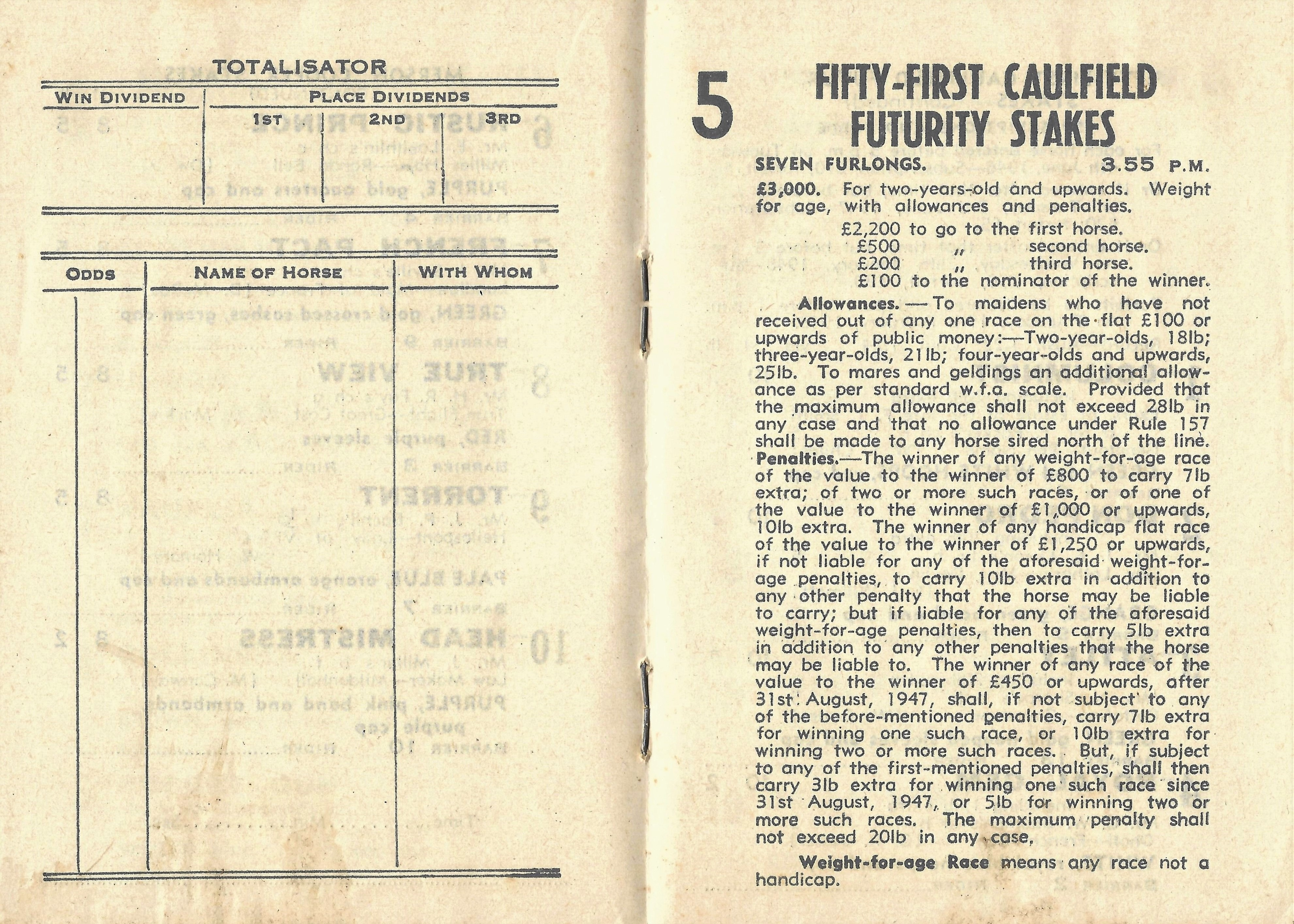
1948 VATC Futurity Stakes showing race conditions

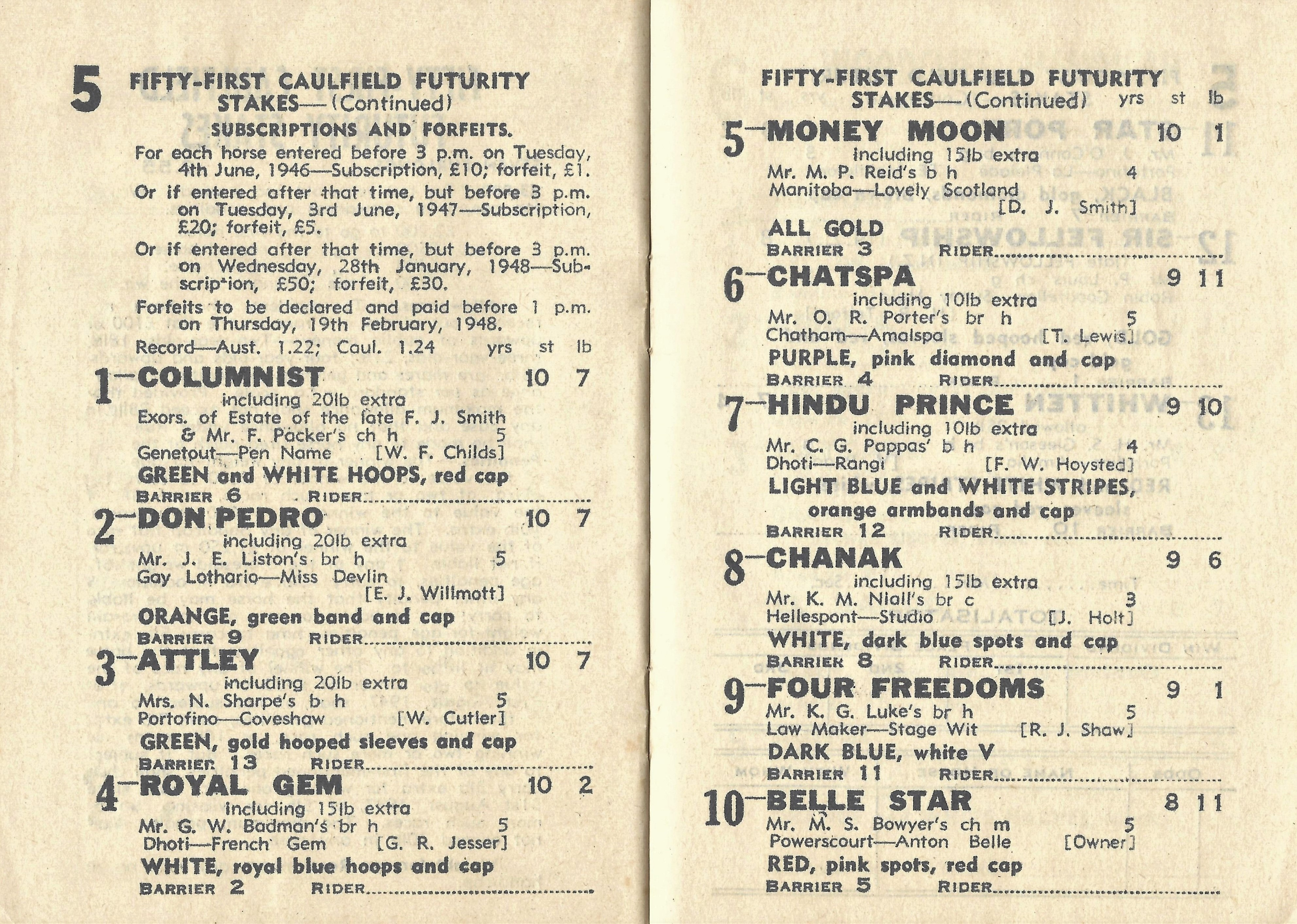
1948 VATC Futurity Stakes showing the winner, Royal Gem

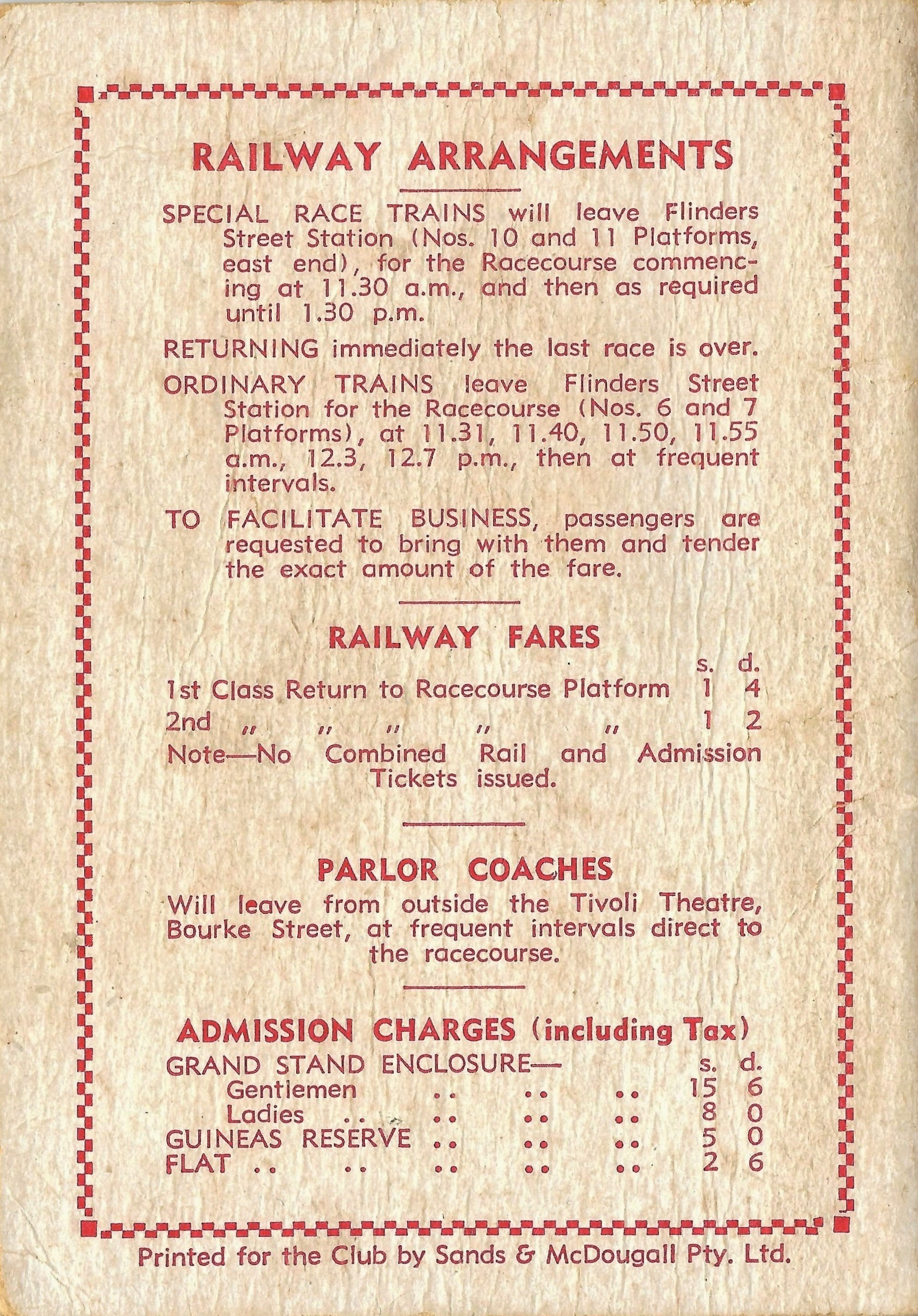
Back cover showing entrance gate and railway charges

=== Gallery of noted winners ===
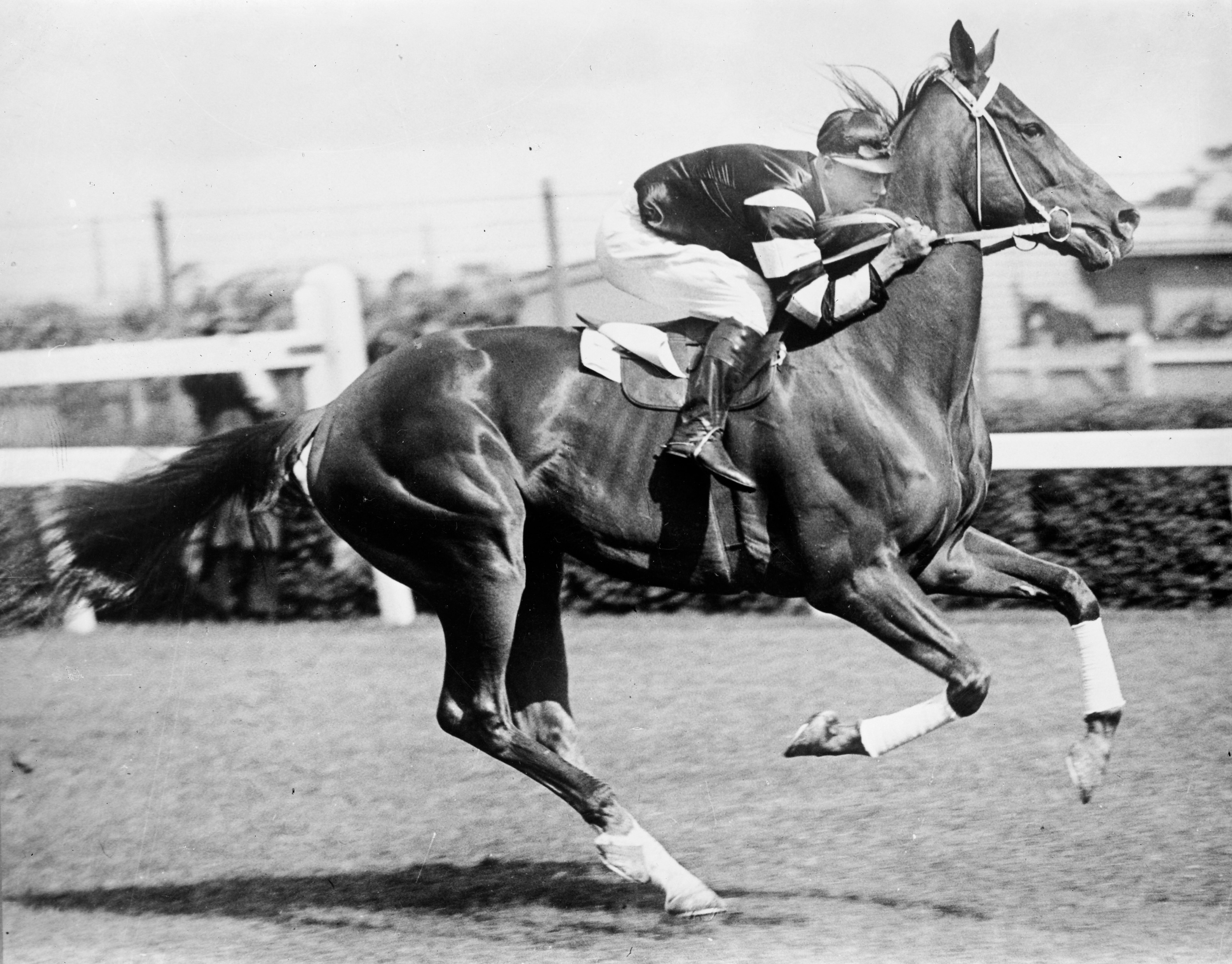
Phar Lap, 1931 winner

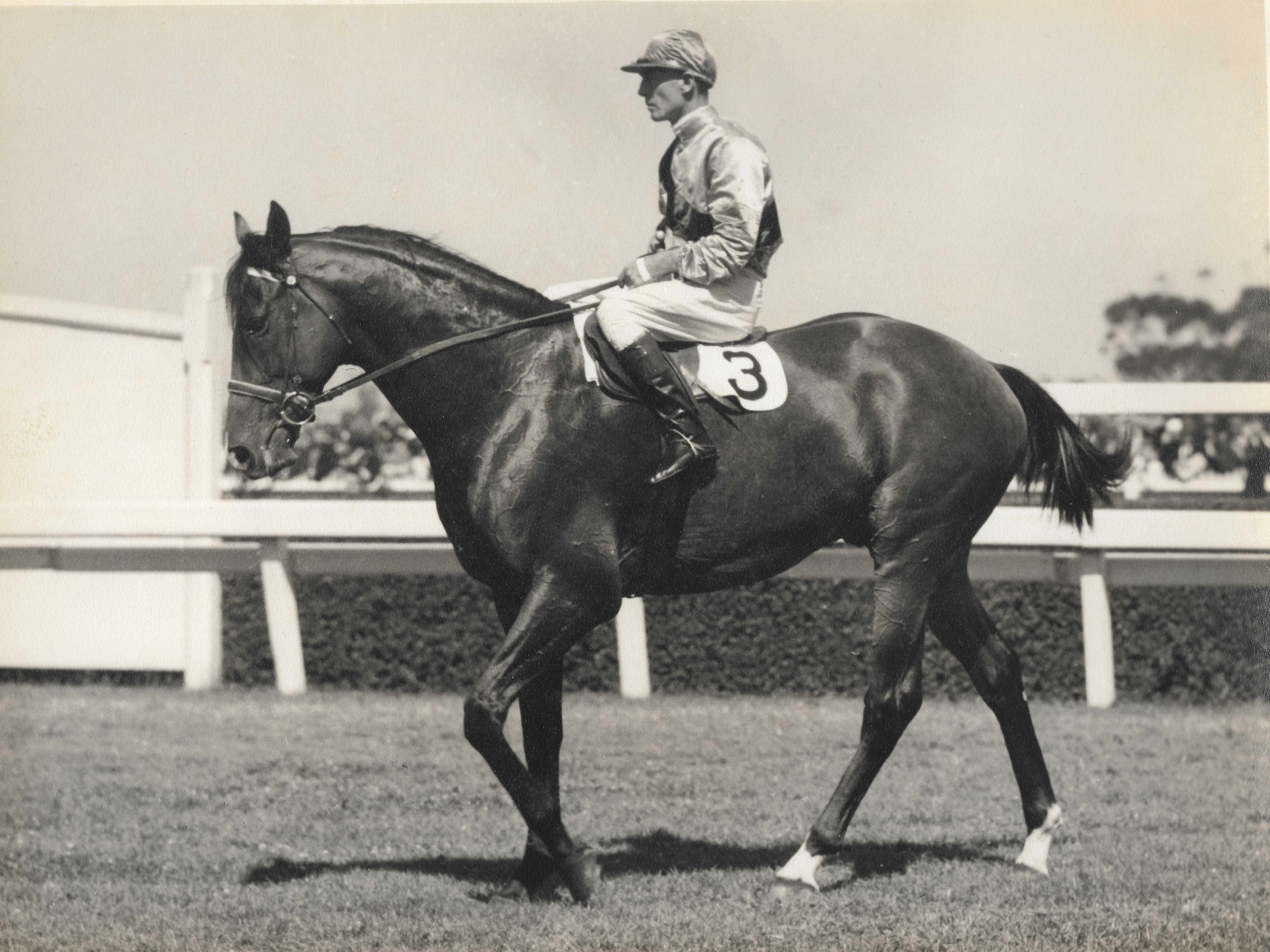
High Caste, 1941 winner

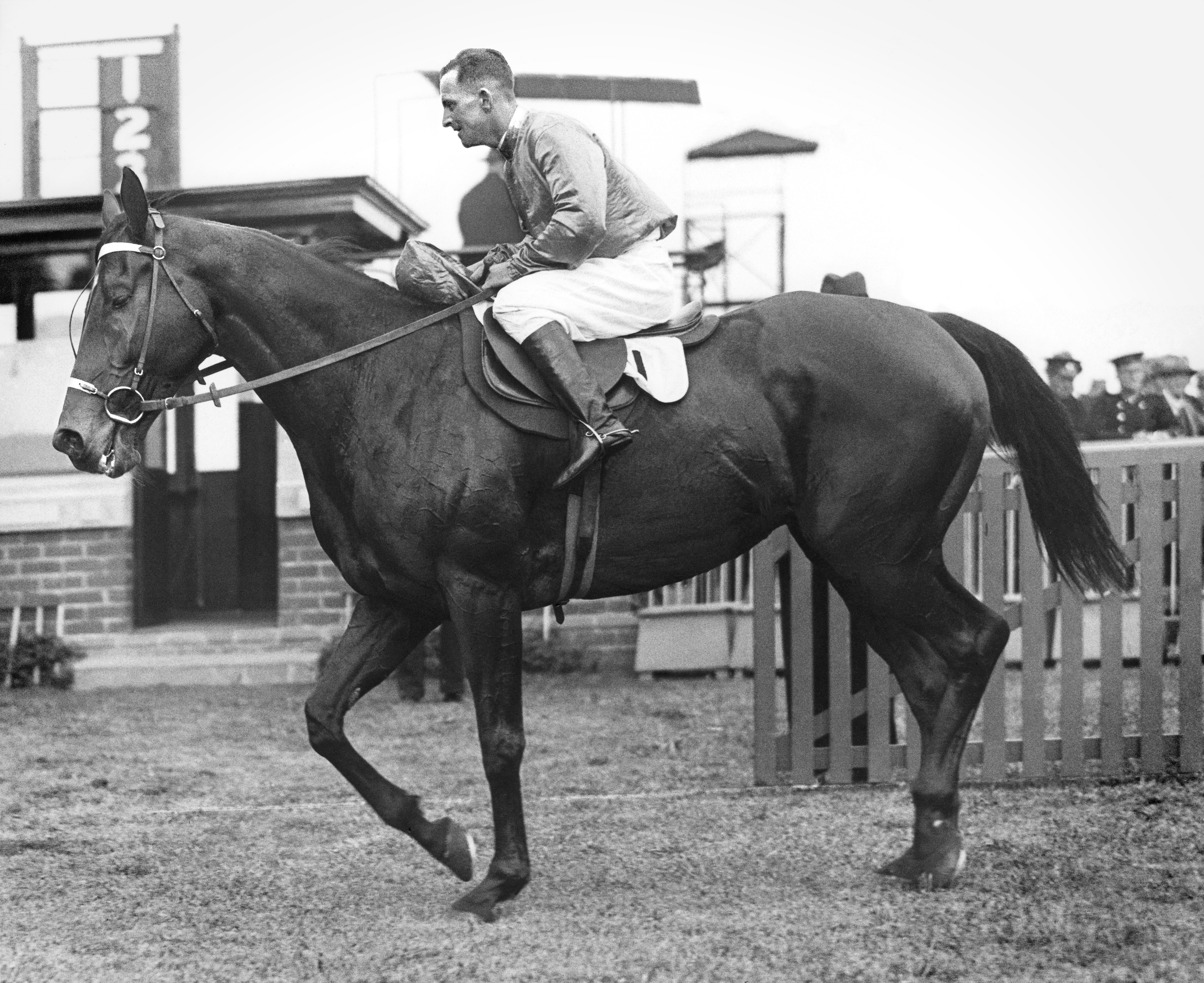
Amounis, 1930 winner

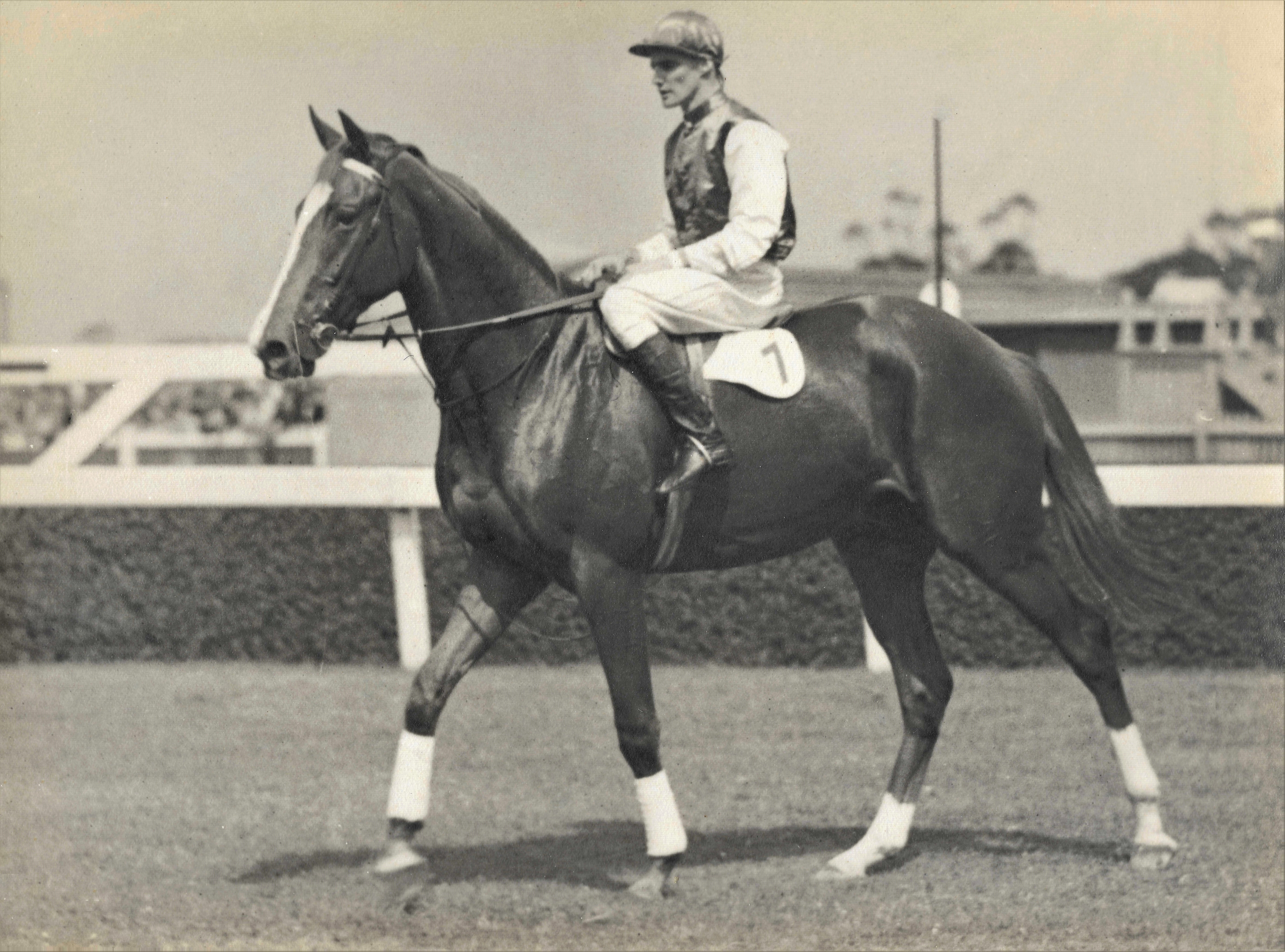
Gold Rod, 1937 winner

== Winners ==
The following are past winners of the race.

- 1898 - Resolute
- 1899 - Bobadil
- 1900 - Palmer
- 1901 - Aurous
- 1902 - Sir Foote
- 1903 - Sir Leonard
- 1904 - Playaway
- 1905 - Gladsome
- 1906 - Gladsome
- 1907 - Corroboree
- 1908 - Antonio
- 1909 - Soultline
- 1910 - Comedy King
- 1911 - Blairgour
- 1912 - Popinjay
- 1913 - Eudorus
- 1914 - Brattle
- 1915 - Flash Of Steel
- 1916 - Maharajah
- 1917 - Balarang
- 1918 - Wedge
- 1919 - Lucknow
- 1920 - Gold Tie
- 1921 - ‡race not held
- 1922 - Eurythmic
- 1923 - Salatis
- 1924 - The Hawk
- 1925 - Father's Voice
- 1926 - Top Gallant
- 1927 - Waranton
- 1928 - Gothic
- 1929 - Mollison
- 1930 - Amounis
- 1931 - Phar Lap
- 1932 - Ammon Ra
- 1933 - Winooka
- 1934 - Waltzing Lily
- 1935 - Heros / Synagogue
- 1936 - Regular Bachelor
- 1937 - Gold Rod
- 1938 - Ajax
- 1939 - Ajax
- 1940 - Ajax
- 1941 - High Caste
- 1942 - Burrabil
- 1943 - Zonda
- 1944 - Counsel
- 1945 - Drum Net
- 1946 - Bernborough
- 1947 - Attley
- 1948 - Royal Gem
- 1949 - St. Razzle
- 1950 - St. Razzle
- 1951 - Iron Duke
- 1952 - San Domenico
- 1953 - Bob Cherry
- 1954 - Sir Isfahan
- 1955 - Prince Cortauld
- 1956 - The Orb
- 1957 - Parvo
- 1958 - Zariba
- 1959 - Lord
- 1960 - Todman
- 1961 - Sky High
- 1962 - Aquanita
- 1963 - Wenona Girl
- 1964 - Future
- 1965 - Sir Dane
- 1966 - Star Affair
- 1967 - Cendrillon
- 1968 - Prince Romantic
- 1969 - Magic Ruler
- 1970 - Crewman
- 1971 - Silver Spade
- 1972 - Gunsynd
- 1973 - Idolou
- 1974 - Idolou
- 1975 - Martindale
- 1976 - King's Helmet
- 1977 - Bonfield
- 1978 - Always Welcome
- 1979 - Manikato
- 1980 - Manikato
- 1981 - Manikato
- 1982 - Galleon
- 1983 - Manikato
- 1984 - Red Tempo
- 1985 - Vite Cheval
- 1986 - Campaign King
- 1987 - Rubiton
- 1988 - Vo Rogue
- 1989 - Zeditave
- 1990 - Ark Regal
- 1991 - Redelva
- 1992 - Mannerism
- 1993 - Schillaci
- 1994 - Primacy
- 1995 - Schillaci
- 1996 - Star Dancer
- 1997 - Mouawad
- 1998 - Encounter
- 1999 - Rustic Dream
- 2000 - Testa Rossa
- 2001 - †Desert Sky / Mr. Murphy
- 2002 - Dash For Cash
- 2003 - Yell
- 2004 - Reset
- 2005 - Regal Roller
- 2006 - Fields Of Omagh
- 2007 - Aqua D'Amore
- 2008 - Niconero
- 2009 - Niconero
- 2010 - Typhoon Tracy
- 2011 - More Joyous
- 2012 - King Mufhasa
- 2013 - All Too Hard
- 2014 - Moment Of Change
- 2015 - Suavito
- 2016 - Turn Me Loose
- 2017 - Black Heart Bart
- 2018 - Brave Smash
- 2019 - Alizee
- 2020 - Streets Of Avalon
- 2021 - Probabeel
- 2022 - Sierra Sue
- 2023 - Alligator Blood
- 2024 - Mr Brightside
- 2025 - Mr Brightside
- 2026 - Pericles

† Dead heat
‡ An embargo on Melbourne racing was in force by the Victorian Cabinet

== See also ==
- List of Australian Group races
- Group races
